= 2019 Women's World Floorball Championships qualification =

Floorball competition

The 2019 IFF Women's World Floorball Championships qualification is a series of tournaments to decide teams which will play in the 2019 Women's World Floorball Championships. The 2019 World Championship will feature 16 teams. 1 place were allocated to the hosts, Switzerland. The remaining 15 places will be determined by a qualification process, in which entrants from among the other teams from the five IFF confederations will compete.

== Qualified teams ==
Team	Qualified as	Qualification date	Appearance			Previous best performance
Team	Qualified as	Qualification date	Last	Total	Streak	Previous best performance
Switzerland	Hosts	24 September 2017	2017	12	12	Champions (2005)
Australia	Asia-Oceania qualification winner	30 January 2019	2017	5	5	12th place (2013, 2015)
Japan	Asia-Oceania qualification runner-up	30 January 2019	2017	7	5	8th place (2005)
Thailand	Asia-Oceania qualification 3rd place	31 January 2019	2017	2	2	13th place (2017)
Singapore	Asia-Oceania qualification 4th place	31 January 2019	2017	4	3	10th place (2007)
Sweden	European qualification Group 1 winner	1 February 2019	2017	12	12	Champions (1997, 2003, 2007, 2009, 2011, 2013, 2015, 2017)
Finland	European qualification Group 2 winner	2 February 2019	2017	12	12	Champions (1999, 2001)
Czech Republic	European qualification Group 3 winner	2 February 2019	2017	12	12	3rd place (2011)
Poland	European qualification Group 3 runner-up	2 February 2019	2017	6	6	6th place (2011)
Slovakia	European qualification Group 4 winner	2 February 2019	2017	5	5	5th place (2017)
Latvia	European qualification Group 4 runner-up	2 February 2019	2017	12	12	4th place (2007)
Norway	European qualification Group 1 runner-up	3 February 2019	2017	12	12	3rd place (1997, 2001)
Germany	European qualification Group 2 runner-up	3 February 2019	2017	9	5	6th place (1999, 2015)
Denmark	European qualification best third-ranked team	3 February 2019	2017	7	7	6th place (2007)
Estonia	European qualification second-best third-ranked team	3 February 2019	2017	2	2	11th place (2017)
United States	American qualification winner	9 February 2019	2017	6	6	9th place (2007, 2011)

== Qualification process ==
The distribution by confederation for the 2019 Women's World Floorball Championships will be:

- Asia and Oceania (AOFC): 4 places
- Europe (no continental confederation but organized by IFF): 10 places (Switzerland qualified automatically as host nations for a total of 11 places)
- Americas (no continental confederation but organized by IFF): 1 place

== Summary ==
Qualified for the 2019 Women's World Floorball Championships as winners, top two or top three
Qualified for the 2019 Women's World Floorball Championships as play-off winners
Other teams were eliminated

Group AMER	Group AOFC–A	Group AOFC–B	Group EUR1	Group EUR2	Group EUR3	Group EUR4
United States	Australia	Japan	Sweden Norway Denmark	Finland Germany	Czech Republic Poland Estonia	Slovakia Latvia
	Thailand	Singapore				
Canada	New Zealand Philippines	Malaysia South Korea	France	Russia Spain Austria	Italy Belgium	Hungary Netherlands

== American qualification ==
The American qualification were played between 8 and 9 February 2019 in Detroit, United States.

=== Group composition ===
Group AMER
United States (11) **(H)**
Canada (21)

Notes

- Teams in **bold** qualified for the final tournament.
- (H): Qualification group hosts

=== Group AMER ===
Pos	Team	Pld	W	D	L	GF	GA	GD	Pts	Qualification
1	United States (H)	2	2	0	0	21	3	+18	**4**	IFF World Championships
2	Canada	2	0	0	2	3	21	−18	**0**	

Source: IFF
(H) Hosts

8 February 2019; 19:10	**United States**	**14–2** (4–0, 3–1, 7–1)	Canada	Brownstown Sports Center, Detroit

Game reference

9 February 2019; 19:10	Canada	**1–7** (0–3, 1–2, 0–2)	**United States**	Brownstown Sports Center, Detroit

Game reference

== Asia-Oceania qualification ==
The Asia-Oceania qualification were played between 27 January to 1 February 2019 in Bangkok, Thailand.

=== Group composition ===
Group A	Group B
**Australia** (12); **Thailand** (19) **(H)**; New Zealand (20); Philippines (32)	**Japan** (14); **Singapore** (15); South Korea (24); Malaysia (26)

Notes

- Teams in **bold** qualified for the final tournament.
- (H): Qualification group hosts

=== Group A ===
Pos	Team	Pld	W	D	L	GF	GA	GD	Pts	Qualification	Australia	Thailand	New Zealand	Philippines
1	Australia	3	3	0	0	25	2	+23	**6**	Final and IFF World Championships	—	8–2	7–0	10–0
2	Thailand (H)	3	2	0	1	19	9	+10	**4**	Semifinals	2–8	—	6–1	11–0
3	New Zealand	3	1	0	2	5	15	−10	**2**	Semifinals	0–7	1–6	—	4–2
4	Philippines	3	0	0	3	2	25	−23	**0**	7th place game	0–10	0–11	2–4	—

Source: IFF
(H) Hosts

=== Group B ===
Pos	Team	Pld	W	D	L	GF	GA	GD	Pts	Qualification	Japan	Singapore	Malaysia	South Korea
1	Japan	3	2	1	0	18	7	+11	**5**	Final and IFF World Championships	—	4–2	4–4	10–1
2	Singapore	3	2	0	1	17	8	+9	**4**	Semifinals	2–4	—	5–2	10–2
3	Malaysia	3	1	1	1	14	15	−1	**3**	Semifinals	4–4	2–5	—	8–6
4	South Korea	3	0	0	3	9	28	−19	**0**	7th place game	1–10	2–10	6–8	—

Source: IFF

=== Final round ===
All times are local (UTC+7).

==== Seventh place game ====
31 January 2019; 12:00	**South Korea**	**4–3** (3–1, 1–2, 0–0)	Philippines	Indoor Stadium Huamark, Bangkok

Game reference

==== Semifinals ====
31 January 2019; 15:00	**Thailand**	**2–1 OT** (0–0, 1–0, 0–1, 1–0)	Malaysia	Indoor Stadium Huamark, Bangkok

Game reference

31 January 2019; 18:00	**Singapore**	**10–4** (1–0, 4–0, 5–4)	New Zealand	Indoor Stadium Huamark, Bangkok

Game reference

==== Fifth place game ====
1 February 2019; 12:00	**Malaysia**	**5–4** (2–3, 3–0, 0–1)	New Zealand	Indoor Stadium Huamark, Bangkok

Game reference

==== Third place game ====
1 February 2019; 12:00	**Thailand**	**5–4** (3–0, 2–2, 0–2)	Singapore	Indoor Stadium Huamark, Bangkok

Game reference

==== Final ====
1 February 2019; 12:00	**Australia**	**5–4 OT** (1–1, 2–2, 1–1, 1–0)	Japan	Indoor Stadium Huamark, Bangkok

Game reference

=== Final ranking ===
Qualified for the 2019 Women's World Floorball Championships

Rank	Team
1	Australia
2	Japan
3	Thailand
4	Singapore
5	Malaysia
6	New Zealand
7	South Korea
8	Philippines

== European qualification ==
=== Group composition ===
Group EUR1	Group EUR2	Group EUR3	Group EUR4
**Sweden** (1); **Norway** (9); **Denmark** (10); France (27)	**Czech Republic** (4); **Poland** (7) **(H)**; **Estonia** (16); Italy (21); Belgium (–)	**Finland** (2); **Germany** (8); Russia (13); Spain (23); Austria (29)	**Latvia** (5); **Slovakia** (6) **(H)**; Hungary (17); Netherlands (18)

Notes

- Teams in **bold** qualified for the final tournament.
- (H): Qualification group hosts

=== Group EUR1 ===
The European qualification group EUR1 were played between 30 January to 3 February 2019 in Gdańsk, Poland.

Pos	Team	Pld	W	D	L	GF	GA	GD	Pts	Qualification	Sweden	Norway	Denmark	France
1	Sweden	3	3	0	0	91	2	+89	**6**	IFF World Championships	—	17–1	13–1	61–0
2	Norway	3	2	0	1	19	18	+1	**4**	IFF World Championships	1–17	—	4–1	14–0
3	Denmark	3	1	0	2	21	17	+4	**2**	IFF World Championships	1–13	1–4	—	19–0
4	France	3	0	0	3	0	94	−94	**0**		0–61	0–14	0–19	—

Source: IFF

=== Group EUR2 ===
The European qualification group EUR2 were played between 30 January to 3 February 2019 in Trenčín, Slovakia.

Pos	Team	Pld	W	D	L	GF	GA	GD	Pts	Qualification	Finland	Germany	Russia	Spain	Austria
1	Finland	4	4	0	0	92	4	+88	**8**	IFF World Championships	—	16–2	18–1	21–1	37–0
2	Germany	4	3	0	1	33	24	+9	**6**	IFF World Championships	2–16	—	8–4	6–3	17–1
3	Russia	4	2	0	2	28	33	−5	**4**		1–18	4–8	—	10–3	13–4
4	Spain	4	0	1	3	12	42	−30	**1**		1–21	3–6	3–10	—	5–5
5	Austria	4	0	1	3	10	72	−62	**1**		0–37	1–17	4–13	5–5	—

Source: IFF

=== Group EUR3 ===
The European qualification group EUR3 were played between 30 January to 3 February 2019 in Gdańsk, Poland.

Pos	Team	Pld	W	D	L	GF	GA	GD	Pts	Qualification	Czech Republic	Poland	Estonia	Italy	Belgium
1	Czech Republic	4	4	0	0	75	6	+69	**8**	IFF World Championships	—	5–2	10–3	34–1	26–0
2	Poland (H)	4	3	0	1	36	7	+29	**6**	IFF World Championships	2–5	—	7–1	18–1	9–0
3	Estonia	4	2	0	2	26	19	+7	**4**	IFF World Championships	3–10	1–7	—	13–1	9–1
4	Italy	4	1	0	3	7	68	−61	**2**		1–34	1–18	1–13	—	4–3
5	Belgium	4	0	0	4	4	48	−44	**0**		0–26	0–9	1–9	3–4	—

Source: IFF
(H) Hosts

=== Group EUR4 ===
The European qualification group EUR4 were played between 31 January to 3 February 2019 in Trenčín, Slovakia.

Pos	Team	Pld	W	D	L	GF	GA	GD	Pts	Qualification	Slovakia	Latvia	Hungary	Netherlands
1	Slovakia (H)	3	3	0	0	25	6	+19	**6**	IFF World Championships	—	5–3	12–1	8–2
2	Latvia	3	2	0	1	20	8	+12	**4**	IFF World Championships	3–5	—	6–1	11–2
3	Hungary	3	1	0	2	6	19	−13	**2**		1–12	1–6	—	4–1
4	Netherlands	3	0	0	3	5	23	−18	**0**		2–8	2–11	1–4	—

Source: IFF
(H) Hosts

=== Ranking of third-placed teams ===
The two best third-placed teams from the groups qualified for the final tournament. Matches against the fifth-placed team are not included in this ranking.

Pos	Grp	Team	Pld	W	D	L	GF	GA	GD	Pts	Qualification
1	**1**	Denmark	3	1	0	2	21	17	+4	**2**	IFF World Championships
2	**3**	Estonia	3	1	0	2	17	18	−1	**2**	IFF World Championships
3	**4**	Hungary	3	1	0	2	6	19	−13	**2**	
4	**2**	Russia	3	1	0	2	15	29	−14	**2**	

Rules for classification: 1) points; 2) goal difference; 3) goals scored; 4) drawing of lots.
