= 2027 Women's World Floorball Championships =

16th edition of the Women's World Floorball Championships

Tournament details
- Host country: Finland
- Dates: 3 December – 11 December
- Teams: 16

The 2027 Women's World Floorball Championships will be the 16th edition of the Women's World Floorball Championship. It will be held from 3 to 11 December 2027 in Turku, Finland. It will be the third time that Finland has hosted the women's championships, having most recently done so in 2015. This championship will be the last in the current two-year cycle before the tournament moves to a four-year cycle. In 2029, it will be followed by the continental championships, and next world championship will take in 2031.

== Qualification ==
The final tournament will feature 16 national teams. Finland has secured its participation in advance as the host country. The remaining spots were determined among the 30 registered teams through regional qualifiers. Due to changes in the international floorball calendar, these qualifiers took place in the autumn of 2026, instead of early in the championship year as in previous editions.

Three European qualifiers took between 9 and 15 November 2026 in Wolsztyn, Poland, El Escorial, Spain, and Riga, Latvia. The Polish qualifier featured six teams, while the Spanish qualifier had five, with the top three teams from both advancing. Italy advanced from the Polish qualifier at the expense of Estonia, who will miss the tournament for the first time since 2015. It is the first time Italy have qualified, having previously appeared in 2021 only as a replacement for a withdrawn team. The Latvian qualifier included eight teams divided into two groups; the top team from each group advanced, along with the winners of the play-off matches between the second and third-placed teams from opposite groups.

El Escorial also hosted the Americas qualification from 12 to 14 November, with Canada advancing after 14 years.

The Asia-Oceania qualifier was held from 16 to 21 November in Chonburi, Thailand. The qualifier included eight teams divided into two groups; the top team from each group advanced, along with the winners of the play-off matches between the second and third-placed teams from opposite groups.

=== Qualified teams ===
	Slots	Qualified	WR	2025	Appearance(s)			Previous best performance
	Slots	Qualified	WR	2025	Total	Streak	Last	Previous best performance
Host nation	1	Finland	3rd	3rd	16	16	2025	Champions (1999, 2001)
European Qualification 1	3	Switzerland	1st	1st	16	16	2025	Champions (2005, 2025)
European Qualification 1	3	Italy	23rd	–	2	1	2021	16th place (2021)
European Qualification 1	3	Poland	7th	9th	10	10	2025	5th place (2019, 2021)
European Qualification 2	3	Czech Republic	2nd	2nd	16	16	2025	2nd place (2025)
European Qualification 2	3	Slovakia	6th	7th	9	9	2025	5th place (2017, 2023)
European Qualification 2	3	Germany	10th	10th	13	9	2025	6th place (1999, 2015)
European Qualification 3	4	Sweden	4th	4th	16	16	2025	Champions (11 times) (Note: Sweden have won 1997, 2003, 2007, 2009, 2011, 2013, 2015, 2017, 2019, 2021, 2023)
European Qualification 3	4	Latvia	5th	5th	16	16	2025	4th place (2007)
European Qualification 3	4	Norway	9th	6th	16	16	2025	3rd place (1997, 2001)
European Qualification 3	4	Denmark	8th	8th	11	11	2025	6th place (2007)
Asia-Oceania Qualification	4	Japan	11th	13th	10	3	2025	8th place (2005)
Asia-Oceania Qualification	4	Singapore	13th	16th	8	7	2025	10th place (2007)
Asia-Oceania Qualification	4	Thailand	17th	–	4	1	2021	13th place (2017)
Asia-Oceania Qualification	4	Australia	16th	14th	8	3	2025	11th place (2019)
Americas Qualification	1	Canada	22nd	–	2	1	2013	13th place (2013)

== Venues ==
Both venues for the tournament are in Turku.

Turku		2027 Women's World Floorball Championships is located in Finland
Gatorade Center; Capacity: 11,800	Kupittaa Sports hall Capacity: 2,850	2027 Women's World Floorball Championships is located in Finland
