= IFF World Ranking =

National floorball team ranking

The IFF World Ranking is a ranking of the national teams of member countries of the International Floorball Federation.

== Ranking system ==
The ranking is based on the standings of the two most recent Floorball World Championships. That is 2022 and 2024 for men and 2023 and 2025 for women.

The ranking is also used to determine the seeding of the teams for the next Floorball World Championships and other competitions like World Games.

National champions from the top ranked countries compete at the Champions Cup.

== Current rankings ==
- === Men ===
  Rank	Team
  1	Sweden
  2	Finland
  3	Czech Republic
  4	Latvia
  5	Switzerland
  6	Slovakia
  7	Germany
  8	Norway
  9	Estonia
  10	Denmark
  11	Poland
  12	Philippines
  13	Thailand
  14	Australia
  15	Canada
  16	Slovenia
  17	Singapore
  18	New Zealand
  19	France
  20	Hungary
  21	Spain
  22	Iceland
  23	Japan
  24	South Korea
  25	United States
  26	Austria
  27	Italy
  28	Belgium
  29	Great Britain
  30	Liechtenstein
  31	Netherlands
  32	Ukraine
  33	China
  34	Malaysia
  35	Ivory Coast
  36	Russia
  37	Laos
  38	Cambodia
  39	Serbia
  40	Indonesia
  41	India
  42	Iran
  43	Nigeria
  44	Kenya
  45	Uganda
  46	Myanmar
  47	Jamaica
  48	Georgia
- === Women ===
  Rank	Team
  1	Switzerland
  2	Czech Republic
  3	Finland
  4	Sweden
  5	Latvia
  6	Slovakia
  7	Poland
  8	Denmark
  9	Norway
  10	Germany
  11	Japan
  12	Estonia
  13	Singapore
  14	Netherlands
  15	United States
  16	Australia
  17	Thailand
  18	France
  19	Philippines
  20	Spain
  21	New Zealand
  22	Canada
  23	Italy
  24	Belgium
  25	Hungary
  26	South Korea
  27	Austria
  28	Great Britain
  29	Ukraine
  30	India
  31	Russia
  32	Malaysia
  33	Slovenia
  34	China
  35	Indonesia
  36	Burkina Faso
  37	Kenya
  38	Iran
  39	Ivory Coast
  40	Georgia
