= Anna Wijk =

Swedish floorball player

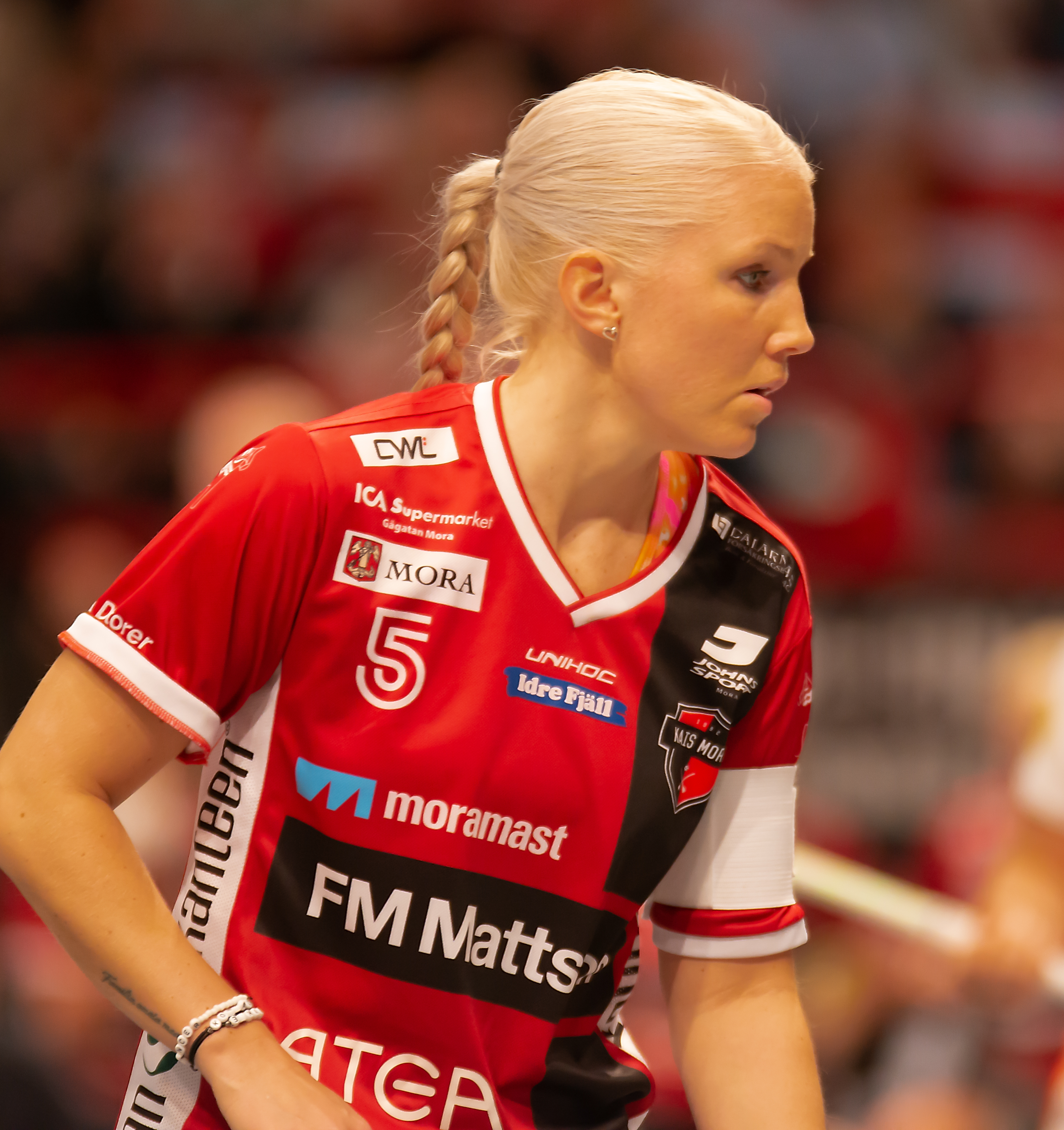
- Wijk in the final of the Swedish Super League 2017–18

Personal information
- National team: Sweden
- Born: 20 June 1991 (age 35) Sandviken, Sweden

Sport
- Sport: Floorball
- Position: Center
- League: Swedish Super League (2008–2020)
- Team: IBK Alba (–2006); Gävle GIK (2007–2008); RIG Umeå IBF (2007–2008); IKSU (2008–2010); KAIS Mora IF (2010–2020); AIK Innebandy (2023–2024); Storvreta IBK (2020, 2025–)
Medal record
Women's floorball
Representing Sweden
World Championships
Gold medal – first place	2009 Sweden	Sweden
Gold medal – first place	2011 Switzerland	Sweden
Gold medal – first place	2013 Czechia	Sweden
Gold medal – first place	2015 Finland	Sweden
Gold medal – first place	2017 Slovakia	Sweden
Gold medal – first place	2019 Switzerland	Sweden
Under-19 World Championships
Silver medal – second place	2008 Poland	Sweden
Gold medal – first place	2010 Czech Republic	Sweden
- Updated on 12 March 2024

Anna Wijk (born 20 June 1991, Sandviken) is a Swedish floorball forward and former national team player. She is a six-time world champion, the Swedish champion of the 2014–15 season, and the winner of the subsequent Champions Cup. In 2014, 2015, 2016, and 2019 she was named the best female floorball player in the world. She played in the Swedish Super League from 2008 to 2020.

== Club career ==
She began playing floorball with the club IBK Alba, where she stayed until 2006, before transferring to Gävle GIK for the 2006–07 season. The following year, she played for RIG Umeå IBF, and subsequently moved to the elite club IKSU. In the 2009–10 season, she ranked third in assists during the regular season, helping her team win silver medals in the Swedish Super League.

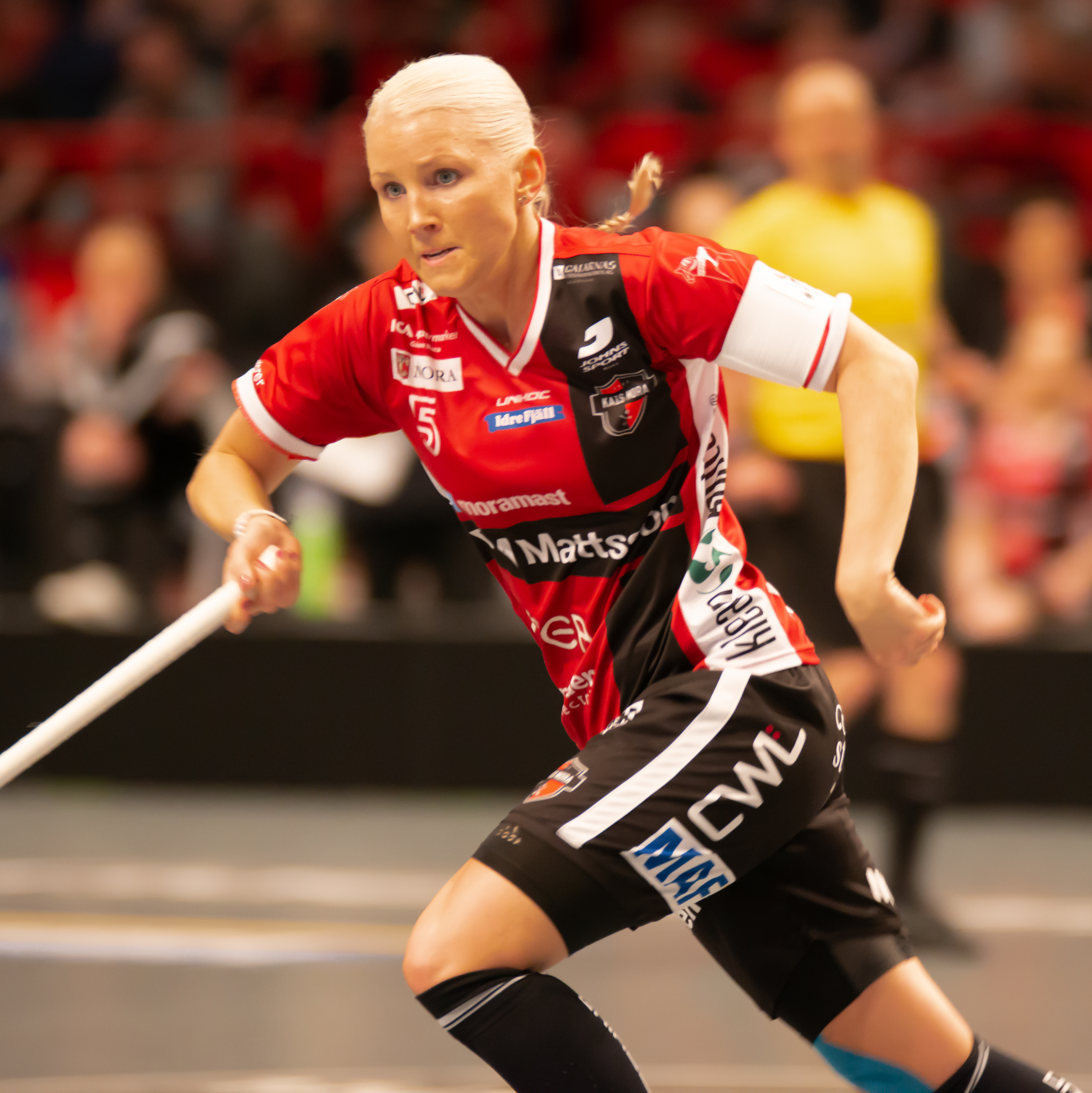
Wijk in the final of the Swedish Super League 2017–18

In 2010, she transferred to KAIS Mora IF, where she experienced the most successful years of her career and became the team captain. The club won the Swedish league in the 2014–15 season, finished second six times, and third three times. In addition, they won the Champions Cup in 2015. During her career in the top Swedish league, Wijk became the most productive player in its history. She held the record until 2025, when she was surpassed by Emelie Wibron.

In 2020, she transferred to the lower Swedish league Allsvenskan Östra, joining Storvreta IBK, where she was expected to help the team gain promotion to the top league. However, the league was suspended in the autumn due to the COVID-19 pandemic, and by the end of 2020 Wijk temporarily returned on loan to her former club KAIS Mora. At the beginning of 2022, she retired from professional floorball. However, in 2025 she made a comeback with Storvreta, helping the team secure promotion to the Super League.

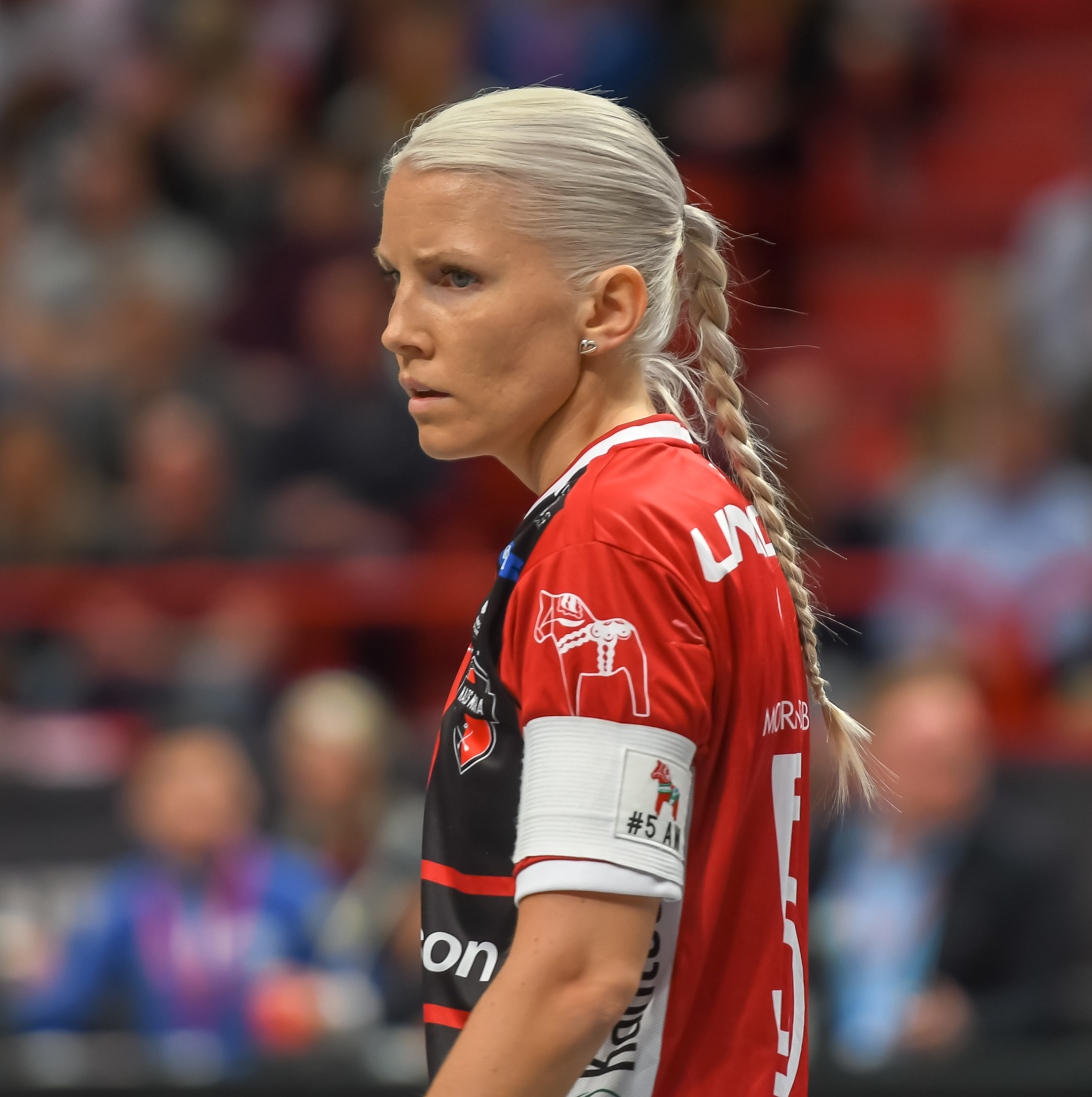
Wijk in the final of the Swedish Super League 2018–19

== International career ==
With the junior national team, she won a silver medal at the 2008 World Championships and the title in 2010.

Since 2009, she had been a regular member of the Swedish women's national team, with which she won the World Championship six times: in 2009, 2011, 2013, 2015, 2017, and 2019. At the 2013 World Championship, she was the tournament's top scorer with 7 goals and 12 assists and was named to the All-Star Team. Two years later, she was voted the Most Valuable Player of the tournament and again selected for the All-Star Team. In 2019, she contributed two assists in the gold medal match, including the decisive one in overtime that secured the title. She was also the tournament's top playmaker, finishing with 4 goals and 20 assists, making her the most productive player of the tournament and setting a new record for most assists at a single World Championship. She was again named to the All-Star Team.

She also took part in the World University Floorball Championships twice, winning gold in 2014 and silver in 2016.

She also served as the captain of the national team until the 2019 World Championship, after which she retired from international play. With a record of 196 points (54 goals and 142 assists) in 106 matches, she is the most productive player in the history of the Swedish national team. She held the record for most points and assists at World Championships until the 2023 tournament, when she was surpassed in points by Emelie Wibron and Corin Rüttimann.
