= Slovenia women's national floorball team =

National women's floorball team of Slovenia

Slovenia women's national floorball team is the national team of Slovenia. The team participated in the Qualification to the B-Division for the 2007 Women's World Floorball Championships. The qualifiers were held in Wolsztyn, Poland and Kapfenberg, Austria. The team did not advance out of qualifiers. The team participated in the Qualification to the B-Division for the 2009 Women's World Floorball Championships. The qualifiers were held in Idrija, Slovenia. The team did not advance out of qualifiers.
