= 2019 Women's World Floorball Championships =

Floorball competition

Tournament details
- Host country: Switzerland
- Venues: 2 (in 1 host city)
- Dates: 7–15 December
- Teams: 16

Final positions
- Champions: Sweden (9th title)
- Runners-up: Switzerland
- Third place: Finland

Tournament statistics
- Matches played: 48
- Goals scored: 532 (11.08 per match)
- Attendance: 44,513 (927 per match)
- Scoring leader(s): (Sweden) Anna Wijk (24 points)

The 2019 Women's World Floorball Championships was the 12th edition of Women's World Floorball Championship. The final tournament took place in Neuchâtel, Switzerland, at the Patinoires du Littoral and La Riveraine arenas from 7 to 15 December 2019. It was the third time Switzerland hosted the Women's World Championship.

Sweden won for the seventh consecutive time and the ninth time overall. Switzerland finished in second place for the second time in history, having defeated Finland in the group stage. As a result, Finland faced Sweden as early as the semifinals for the first time since the 2009 championship, where they lost and failed to reach the final for the first time in 10 years. The Czech Republic finished in fourth place for the fourth consecutive time.

With 44,513 spectators, the championship had a record attendance, surpassing the previous record set at the 2013 championship in the Czech Republic.

== Qualification ==
Host Qualified Did not qualify

	Date	Venue	Vacancies	Qualified
Host nation			1	Switzerland
Asia-Oceania Qualification	27 January – 1 February 2019	(Thailand) Bangkok	4	Australia; Japan; Thailand; Singapore
European Qualification 1	30 January – 3 February 2019	(Poland) Gdańsk	2+1	Sweden; Norway; Denmark
European Qualification 2	30 January – 3 February 2019	(Slovakia) Trenčín	2	Finland; Germany
European Qualification 3	30 January – 3 February 2019	(Poland) Gdańsk	2+1	Czech Republic; Poland; Estonia
European Qualification 4	31 January – 3 February 2019	(Slovakia) Trenčín	2	Slovakia; Latvia
Americas Qualification	8–9 February 2019	(United States) Detroit	1	United States
Total			16	

== Venues ==
Neuchâtel
Patinoires du littoral Arena	La Riveraine Arena

== Draw ==
The draw took place on 14 February 2019 at Ittigen, Switzerland.

Pot 1	Pot 2	Pot 3	Pot 4
Sweden (1); Finland (2); Switzerland (3); Czech Republic (4)	Latvia (5); Slovakia (6); Poland (7); Germany (8)	Norway (9); Denmark (10); United States (11); Australia (12)	Japan (14); Singapore (15); Estonia (16); Thailand (19)

== Preliminary round ==
=== Group A ===
Pos	Team	Pld	W	D	L	GF	GA	GD	Pts	Qualification
1	Switzerland (H)	3	3	0	0	30	5	+25	6	Quarterfinals
2	Finland	3	2	0	1	35	10	+25	4	Quarterfinals
3	Poland	3	1	0	2	7	26	−19	2	Play-off round
4	Germany	3	0	0	3	2	33	−31	0	Play-off round

Source: floorball.sport
(H) Hosts

7 December 2019; 12:00	Finland	14–3 (5–2, 2–1, 7–0)	Poland	Patinoires du Littoral; Attendance: 1,170

Game reference
V. Kauppi 02:51, 17:16, 20:29 O. Kauppi 07:19 (PP), 41:44; Karjalainen 09:21, 31:21, 47:53; Vallenius 14:33; Nieminen 41:20; Saarikoski 43:02; Lampinen 45:36; Piispa 58:07 (PP) Hämäläinen 58:30 Goals Buczek 15:02 Krzywak 16:14 Plechan 34:24
0 min	Penalties	4 min

7 December 2019; 15:15	Switzerland	12–1 (9–0, 2–1, 1–0)	Germany	Patinoires du Littoral; Attendance: 2,251

Game reference
Rüttimann 02:37, 13:14, 14:51 Marti 05:28, 07:54; Suter 12:03; Zwinggi 12:56; Spichiger 13:45; Ulber 14:09; Stella 24:11; Wiki 30:12 Hintermann 50:09 Goals Honicke 23:18
2 min	Penalties	0 min

8 December 2019; 13:30	Finland	4–7 (0–2, 1–3, 3–2)	Switzerland	Patinoires du Littoral; Attendance: 3,542

Game reference
Saario 23:33 Karjalainen 51:14; O. Kauppi 54:08 (WG) Vallenius 56:48 (WG) Goals Mischler 11:37, 50:13 (PS) Liechti 13:43; Wiki 24:05; Rüttimann 26:59; Reinhard 31:16 Scheidegger 59:09 (EN)
0 min	Penalties	2 min

8 December 2019; 16:30	Poland	4–1 (1–0, 1–0, 2–1)	Germany	Patinoires du Littoral; Attendance: 365

Game reference
Krzywak 03:58, 20:29 Buczek 40:33 (PP) Rogala 59:17 (EN) Goals Jurgens 49:29
0 min	Penalties	2 min

9 December 2019; 18:00	Germany	0–17 (0–5, 0–6, 0–6)	Finland	Patinoires du Littoral; Attendance: 142

Game reference
Goals / 04:59 Oona Kauppi / 10:39 Sofia Leino

10 December 2019; 19:30	Poland	0–11 (0–3, 0–5, 0–3)	Switzerland	Patinoires du Littoral; Attendance: 1,586

Game reference
Goals / 7:27 Michelle Wiki / 7:51 Andrea Gamperli

=== Group B ===
Pos	Team	Pld	W	D	L	GF	GA	GD	Pts	Qualification
1	Sweden	3	3	0	0	49	4	+45	6	Quarterfinals
2	Czech Republic	3	2	0	1	35	15	+20	4	Quarterfinals
3	Slovakia	3	1	0	2	11	47	−36	2	Play-off round
4	Latvia	3	0	0	3	8	37	−29	0	Play-off round

Source: floorball.sport

7 December 2019; 18:15	Slovakia	1–23 (1–8, 0–5, 0–10)	Sweden	Patinoires du Littoral; Attendance: 1,234

Game reference
Šponiarová 09:55 Goals Joelsson 03:18 (PP), 08:00, 19:54, 24:54 Steen 08:59; Tschöp 09:10, 20:49, 44:42; Boberg 10:31, 53:15; Wibron 17:35, 21:35, 43:17 (PP), 45:42, 49:10; Delgado Johansson 18:26; Hultgren 27:36, 59:36; Fjellstedt 38:45, 58:53; Granstedt 53:57, 56:42 Aggestål 54:51
6 min	Penalties	2 min

8 December 2019; 10:30	Latvia	2–14 (0–5, 0–2, 2–7)	Czech Republic	Patinoires du Littoral; Attendance: 1,371

Game reference
Ankudinova 42:38; Matisone 58:11 Goals Krupnová 02:53, 07:54 Bočanová 03:26; Urbánková 05:09; Martináková 14:15; Kapcová 39:23; Ratajová 39:56, 43:01, 59:12; Hanzlíková 43:51; Paloncyová 45:28; Repková 50:58, 59:44 Jiráková 56:42 (PP)
4 min	Penalties	0 min

9 December 2019; 13:30	Slovakia	7–5 (3–1, 2–1, 2–3)	Latvia	Parinoires du Littoral; Attendance: 879

Game reference
Michaela Sponiarova 02:09 / Goals

9 December 2019; 19:30	Sweden	10–2 (4–0, 4–2, 2–0,)	Czech Republic	Patinoires du Littoral; Attendance: 426

Game reference
Moa Gustafsson 04:22 / Emelie Wibron 05:00 / Goals

10 December 2019; 16:30	Czech Republic	19–3 (8–0, 5–3, 6–0)	Slovakia	Patinoires du Littoral; Attendance: 512

Game reference
Nela Kapcova 03:40, 11:41 / Vendula Berankova 6:18 / Goals

10 December 2019; 19:30	Sweden	16–1 (4–0, 6–0, 6–1)	Latvia	Patinoires du Littoral; Attendance: 113

Game reference
Stephanie Boberg 10:24 / Goals

=== Group C ===
Pos	Team	Pld	W	D	L	GF	GA	GD	Pts	Qualification
1	Norway	3	3	0	0	14	9	+5	6	Play-off round
2	Denmark	3	2	0	1	17	8	+9	4	Play-off round
3	Estonia	3	1	0	2	13	19	−6	2	13–16th-place semifinals
4	Japan	3	0	0	3	5	13	−8	0	13–16th-place semifinals

Source: floorball.sport

7 December 2019; 12:00	Japan	0–5 (0–2, 0–1, 0–2)	Denmark	La Riveraine; Attendance: 167

Game reference
Goals / 07:54 Katrine Kamman Andersen / 10:21 Cecilia Di Nardo / 38:39 Maria Olausson
0 min	Penalties	2 min

7 December 2019; 15:15	Estonia	4–7 (0–1, 1–2, 3–4)	Norway	La Riveraine; Attendance: 164

Game reference
Kristi Rickberg 34:01 / Goals / 02:01 Marie Gundersen / 34:14 Sofie Kristiansen / 37:01 Rikke Ingebrigtsil Hansen
2 min	Penalties	6 min

8 December 2019; 15:00	Japan	4–6 (2–2, 2–1, 0–3)	Estonia	La Riveraine; Attendance: 171

Game reference
Mahiro Shimizu 04:55 / Yui Goto 05:54 / Mahiro Shimizu 22:46 / Mahiro Shimizu 33:04 / Goals / 6:49 Diana Klavan / 18:41 Kristel Kopel / 29:26 Diana Klavan
2 min	Penalties	2 min

8 December 2019; 18:00	Denmark	4–5 (1–4, 1–1, 2–0)	Norway	La Riveraine; Attendance: 165

Game reference
Cecilia Di Nardo 0:29 / Goals / 03:01 Sandra Craig; 3:57 Sofie Kristiansen
2 min	Penalties	6 min

9 December 2019; 16:30	Norway	2–1 (0–1, 1–0, 1–0)	Japan	La Riveraine; Attendance: 275

Game reference
Heidi Rod 29:45 (53:00) / Goals / 19:23 Fuka Shibata

10 December 2019; 13:30	Denmark	8–3 (2–1, 2–1, 4–1)	Estonia	La Riveraine

Game reference
Lina Voldby 1:34 / Goals

=== Group D ===
Pos	Team	Pld	W	D	L	GF	GA	GD	Pts	Qualification
1	Singapore	3	3	0	0	14	6	+8	6	Play-off round
2	Australia	3	2	0	1	12	9	+3	4	Play-off round
3	Thailand	3	1	0	2	12	12	0	2	13–16th-place semifinals
4	United States	3	0	0	3	11	22	−11	0	13–16th-place semifinals

Source: floorball.sport

7 December 2019; 18:15	Australia	5–4 (1–1, 3–1, 1–2)	United States	La Riveraine; Attendance: 241

Game reference
Yasmine Skene 09:24 / Janelle Miller 27:52 / Goals / 08:54 Christine Lindberg / 30:56 Marie Haggstorm
4 min	Penalties	0 min

8 December 2019; 12:00	Thailand	1–3 (1–0, 1–1, 0–2)	Singapore	La Riveraine; Attendance: 163

Game reference
Thanporn Tongkham 16:37 / Goals / 32:38 Amanda Yeap
2 min	Penalties	2 min

9 December 2019; 10:30	Australia	4–1 (0–1, 2–0, 2–0)	Thailand	La Riveraine; Attendance: 1,072

Game reference
Amanda Bartim 22:36 / Blasie Hodges 38:21 / Jessica Birks 56:05 / Goals / 18:41 Thanaphon Tongkham

9 December 2019; 15:00	United States	2–7 (2–1, 0–4, 0–2)	Singapore	La Riveraine

Game reference
Vera Niskanen 14:10 / Maggie Haggstrom 16:19 / Goals / 05:30 Yun Shawn Lee

10 December 2019; 10:30	Singapore	4–3 (0–2, 3–0, 1–1)	Australia	La Riveraine

Game reference
Lina Chu 25:13 / Michelle Lok 29:32 / Goals / Jessica Birks 01:05 / Blasie Hodges 12:00

10 December 2019; 16:30	United States	5–10 (1–2, 1–4, 3–4)	Thailand	La Riverane

Game reference

== Knockout stage ==
=== Bracket ===
Play-off; 11 December
Germany	7
Singapore	6
Slovakia	6
Denmark	3
Latvia	6
Norway	4
Poland	10
Australia	3

Quarterfinals; 12–13 December
Sweden	26
Germany	2
Finland	8
Slovakia	6
Switzerland	10
Latvia	4
Czech Republic	11
Poland	4

Semifinals; 14 December
Sweden	5
Finland	4
Switzerland	7
Czech Republic	6

Final; 15 December
Sweden	3
Switzerland	2
Third place
Finland	5
Czech Republic	4

=== Play-off round ===
11 December 2019; 12:00	Latvia	6–4 (1–2, 3–1, 2–1)	Norway	Patinoires du Littoral

Game reference
Julija Rozite 13:30 / Goals

11 December 2019; 13:00	Germany	7–6 (3–1, 2–4, 2–1)	Singapore	Patinoires du Littoral

Game reference
Laura Honicke 02:45 / Jessica Schulz 3:32 / Goals / 03:10 Amanda Yeap

11 December 2019; 16:00	Slovakia	6–3 (3–1, 1–2, 2–0)	Denmark	Patinoires du Littoral

Game reference
Kristina Hudakova 00:38 / Goals

11 December 2019; 19:00	Poland	10–3 (2–1, 3–2, 5–0)	Australia	Patinoires du Littoral

Game reference
Katarzyna Rogala 16:42 / Malwina Zagorska 17:59 / Goals / 02:57 Isabelle Newland / 03:00 Jessica Birks

=== Quarterfinals ===
12 December 2019; 16:00	Finland	8–6 (5–2, 1–2, 2–2)	Slovakia	Patinoires du Littoral

Game reference
Oona Kauppi 2:06 / Goals / Viktoria Grossova 0:57

12 December 2019; 19:00	Switzerland	10–4 (5–0, 4–2, 1–2)	Latvia	Patinoires du Littoral; Attendance: 897

Game reference
Isabelle Gerig 2:09, 4:18 / Margrit Scheidegger 10:47 / Goals

13 December 2019; 16:00	Czech Republic	11–4 (4–3, 4–0, 3–1)	Poland	Patinoires du Littoral

Game reference
Tereza Urbankova 5:10 / / Goals

13 December 2019; 19:00	Sweden	26–2 (8–1, 11–0, 7–1)	Germany	Patinores du Littoral; Attendance: 492

Game reference
Iza Rydfjall 1:22 / Sara Steen 3:23 / Stephanie Boberg 9:22 / Goals / 18:52 Alexandra Kurth

=== Semifinals ===
14 December 2019; 14:30	Sweden	5–4 (1–0, 3–3, 1–1)	Finland	Patinoires du littoral

Game reference
Emelie Wibron 18:36 / Stephanie Boberg 22:24 / Goals

14 December 2019; 17:45	Switzerland	7–6 (0–3, 1–2, 5–1); OT: 1–0	Czech Republic	Patinoires du Littoral

Game reference
Isabelle Gerig 36:51 / Flurina Marti 51:37 / Goals

=== Bronze-medal game ===
15 December 2019; 12:00	Finland	5–4 (1–0, 0–3, 3–1); OT: 1–0	Czech Republic	Patinoires du Littoral

Game reference
Oona Kauppi 18:54 41:40 / Goals

=== Final ===
15 December 2019; 15:00	Sweden	3–2 (1–1, 1–0, 0–1); OT: 1–0	Switzerland	Patinoires du Littoral

Game reference
Moa Gustaffson 12:02, 22:58 / Goals

== Placement round ==
=== 13th-place bracket ===
13–16th-place semifinals
11 December 12:00
Thailand	3
Japan	6
11 December 15:00
Estonia	4
United States	3

13th-place game
12 December 13:00
Japan	4
Estonia	3
15th-place game
12 December 10:00
Thailand	10
United States	6

=== 13–16th-place semifinals ===
11 December 2019; 10:00	Thailand	3–6 (1–4, 0–1, 2–1)	Japan	La Riveraine

Game reference
Goals / 0:52 Mahiro Shimizu

11 December 2019; 15:00	Estonia	4–3 OT (0–1, 0–1, 3–1); OT: 1–0	United States	La Riveraine

Game reference

=== 15th-place game ===
12 December 2019; 10:00	Thailand	10–6 (3–3, 2–1, 5–2)	United States	Patinoires du Littoral

Game reference

=== 13th-place game ===
12 December 2019; 13:00	Japan	4–3 (0–1, 3–1, 1–1)	Estonia	Patinoires du Littoral

Game reference

=== 9th-place bracket ===
9–12th-place semifinals
12 December 12:00
Denmark	9
Singapore	4
12 December 15:00
Australia	2
Norway	7

9th-place game
13 December 13:00
Denmark	2
Norway	3
11th-place game
13 December 10:00
Singapore	1
Australia	3

=== 9–12th-place semifinals ===
12 December 2019; 12:00	Denmark	9–4 (3–1, 5–2, 1–1)	Singapore	La Riveraine

Game reference
Cecilia Di Nardo 7:58 / Goals / 14:49 Amanda Yeap

12 December 2019; 15:00	Australia	2–7 (1–3, 0–3, 1–1)	Norway	La Riveraine

Game reference
Blasie Hodges 13:50 / Jessica Birks 54:02 / Goals / 11:50 Martina Hall

=== 11th-place game ===
13 December 2019; 10:00	Singapore	1–3 (1–2, 0–0, 0–1)	Australia	Patinoires du Littoral

Game reference
Amanda Yeap 12:08 / Goals / 16:33, 16:53 Amanda Bartrim

=== 9th-place game ===
13 December 2019; 13:00	Denmark	2–3 (1–0, 0–1, 1–2)	Norway	Patinoires du Littoral

Game reference

=== 5th-place bracket ===
5–8th-place semifinals
14 December 11:30
Latvia	1
Poland	6
14 December 11:30
Germany	1
Slovakia	6

5th-place game
15 December 11:30
Poland	8
Slovakia	4
7th-place game
15 December 11:30
Latvia	3
Germany	4

=== 5–8th-place semifinals ===
14 December 2019; 11:30	Germany	1–6 (0–0, 0–1, 1–5)	Slovakia	Patinoires du Littoral

Game reference
Theresa Beppler-Alt 54:32 / Goals

14 December 2019; 11:30	Latvia	1–6 (1–2, 0–2, 0–2)	Poland	La Riveraine

Game reference

=== 7th-place game ===
15 December 2019; 11:30	Latvia	3–4 (2–1, 1–3, 0–0)	Germany	Patinoires du Littoral

Game reference

=== 5th-place game ===
15 December 2019; 11:30	Poland	8–4 (1–2, 3–1, 4–1)	Slovakia	La Riveraine

Game reference

== Team of the tournament ==
Tournament all-star team:

- Best goalkeeper: (Switzerland) Lara Heini
- Best defenders: (Finland) My Kippilä, (Switzerland) Flurina Marti
- Best center: (Sweden) Anna Wijk
- Best forwards: (Czech Republic) Denisa Ratajová, (Sweden) Emelie Wibron
- Most valuable player: (Finland) Oona Kauppi

== Final ranking ==
1st place, gold medalist(s)	Sweden
2nd place, silver medalist(s)	Switzerland
3rd place, bronze medalist(s)	Finland
4	Czech Republic
5	Poland
6	Slovakia
7	Germany
8	Latvia
9	Norway
10	Denmark
11	Australia
12	Singapore
13	Japan
14	Estonia
15	Thailand
16	United States
