= Norway women's national floorball team =

- IFF Ranking: 9th (2025)

Norway women's national floorball team is the national team of Norway in women's floorball.

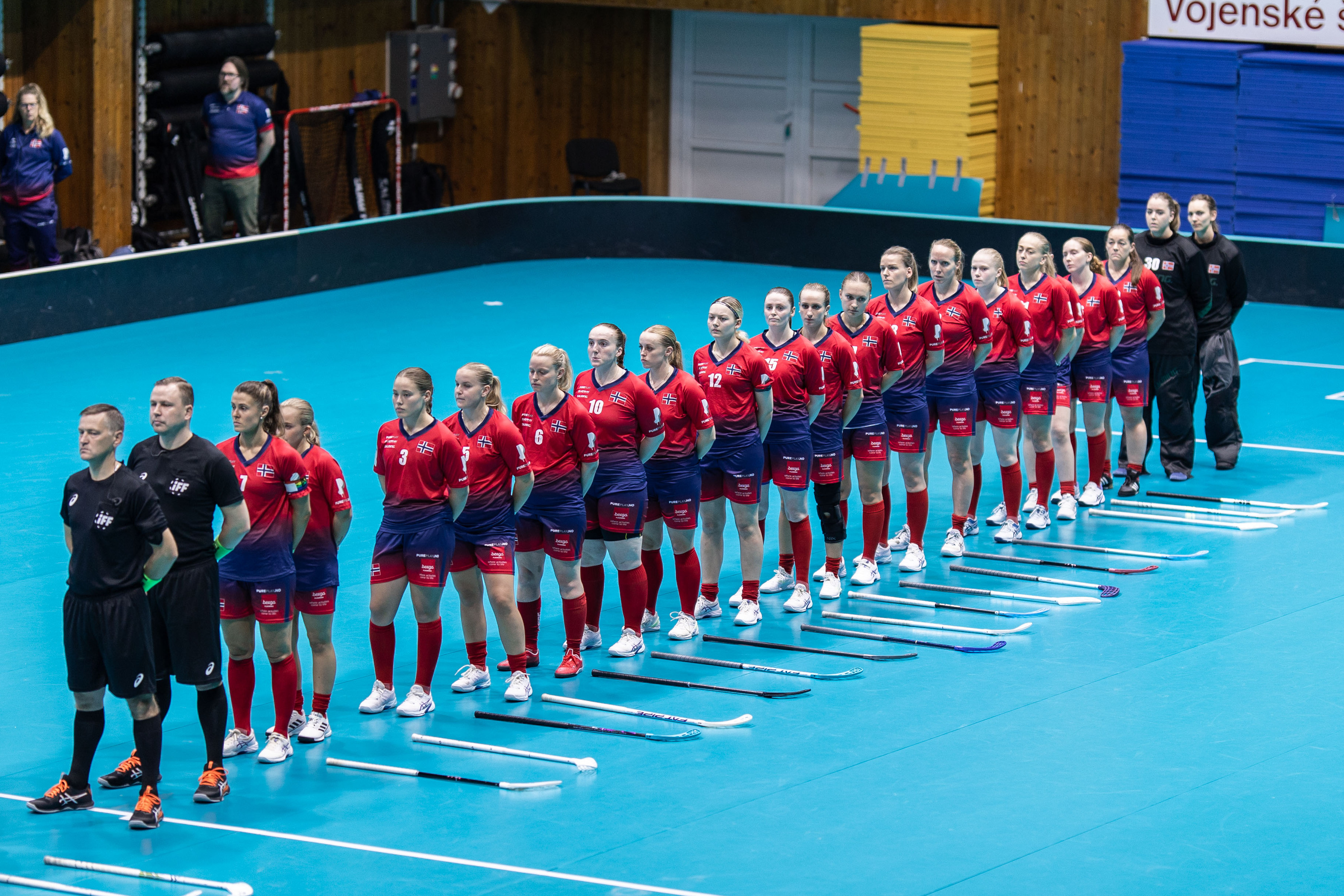
Norway national team before a friendly match in 2023

The team has participated in all editions of both the World Championships and the European Championships. Norway won two bronze medals at the 1997 and 2001 World Championships, and a silver medal at the only 1995 European Championships. In the all-time medal table, the team shares fourth place with the Czech Republic, behind Switzerland.

After finishing eleventh and sixth at the last two championships in 2023 and 2025, Norway is ranked ninth in the IFF rankings (behind Denmark and ahead of Germany).

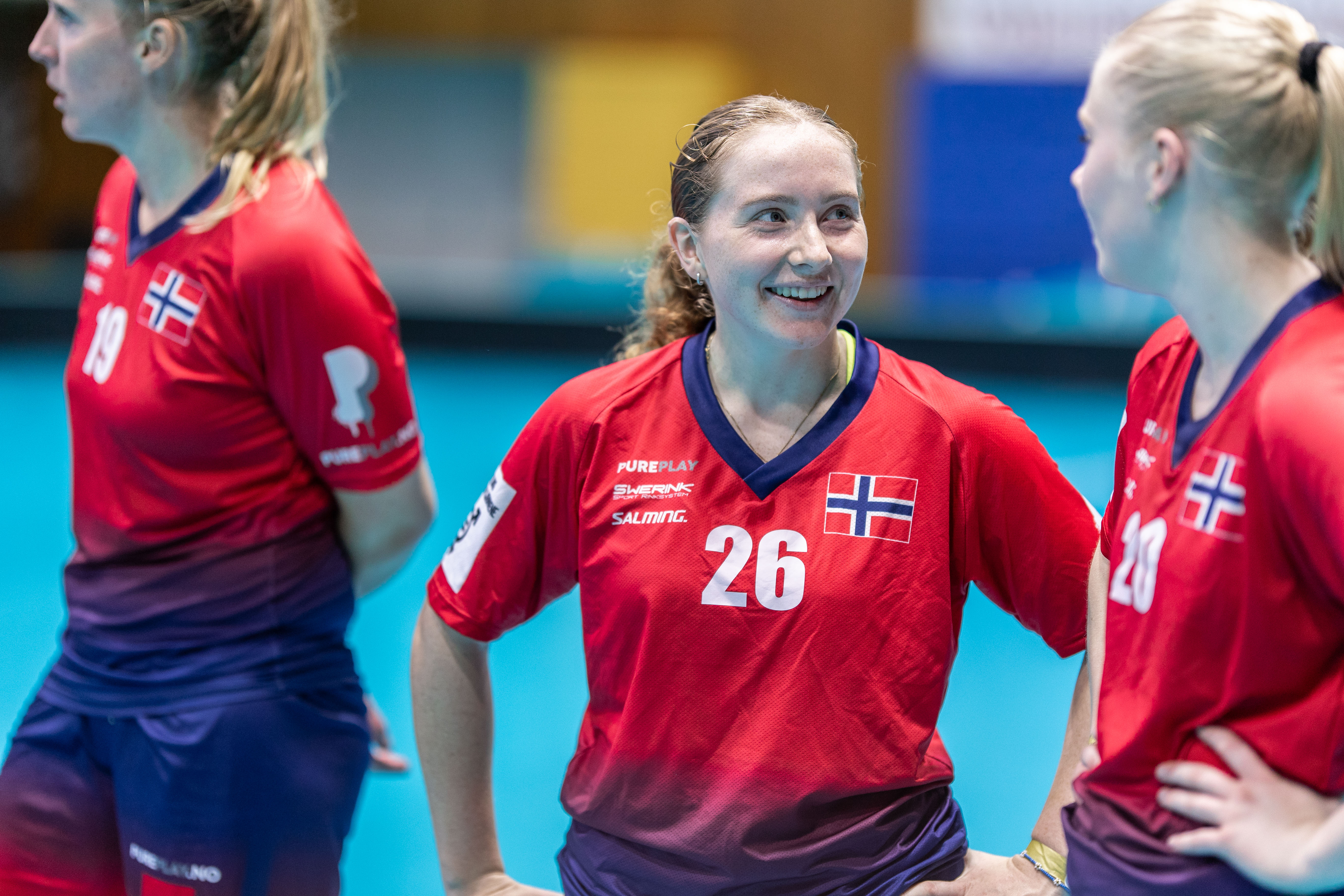
Players of the Norway national team in a friendly match in 2023

== World Championships ==
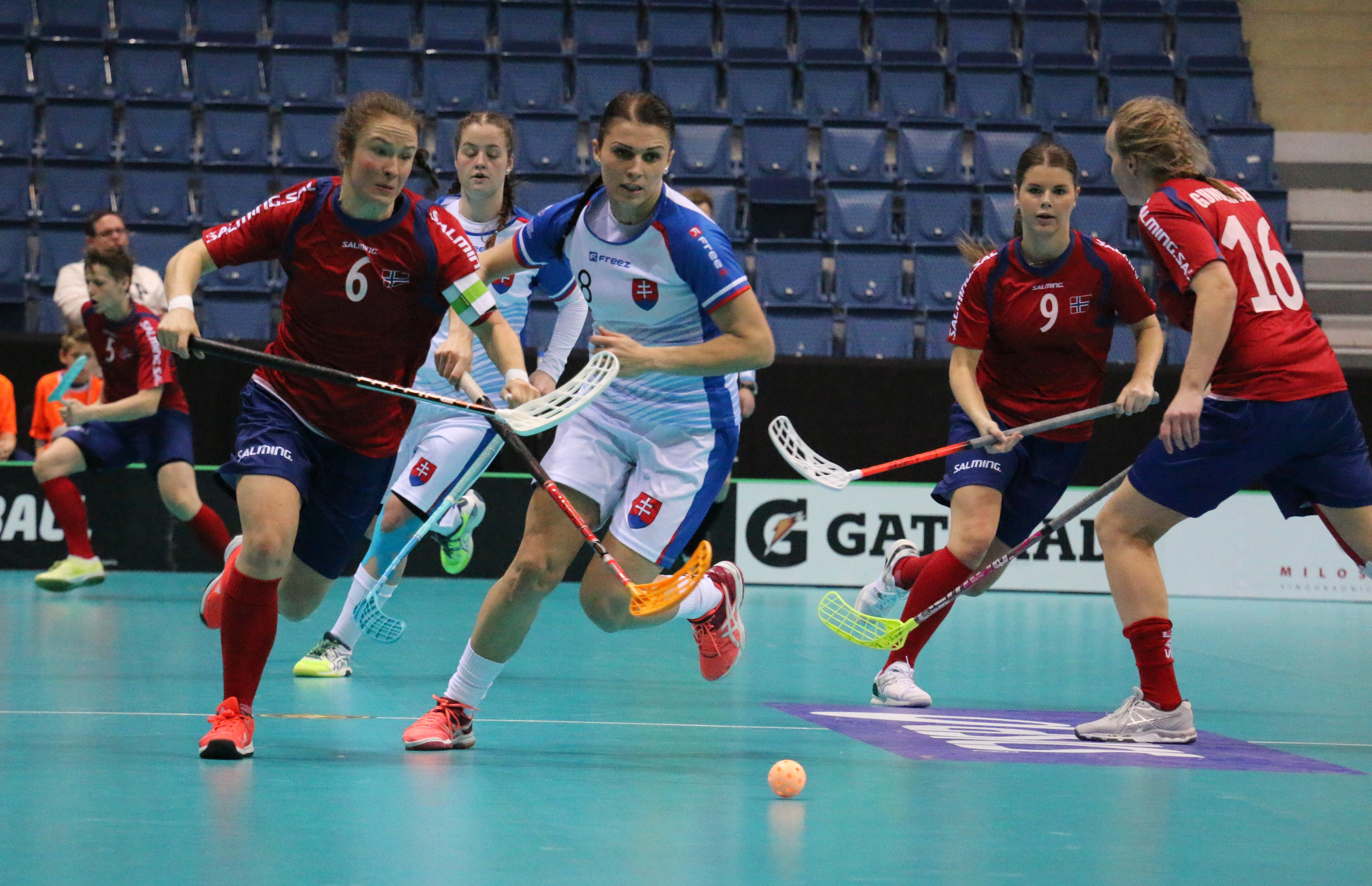
Players of the Norway national team (in red) at the 2017 World Championships in a match against Slovakia

Year	Hosting Country	Rank	Final match
1997	Finland	3rd place	Switzerland 4 : 3 OT
1999	Sweden	4th place	Sweden 1 : 5
2001	Latvia	3rd place	Switzerland 4 : 3
2003	Switzerland	4th place	Finland 2 : 4
2005	Singapore	4th place	Sweden 1 : 15
2007	Denmark	8th place	Russia 2 : 3
2009	Sweden	7th place	Poland 6 : 5 OT
2011	Switzerland	5th place	Poland 5 : 4 OT
2013	Czech Republic	6th place	Latvia 3 : 4 OT
2015	Finland	9th place	Denmark 2 : 0
2017	Slovakia	8th place	Poland 3 : 12
2019	Switzerland	9th place	Denmark 3 : 2
2021	Sweden	7th place	Denmark 3 : 2 OT
2023	Singapore	11th place	Singapore 13 : 1
2025	Czech Republic	6th place	Latvia 3 : 5

== European Championships ==
Year	Hosting Country	Rank	Final match
1995	Switzerland	2nd place	Sweden 2 : 8

== World Championship Medal record ==
Medal	Won	Year(s)
3rd place, bronze medalist(s)	2	1997, 2001

== All-time World Championship Results ==
Year	Position	GP	W	D	L	GF	GA	+/-
1997 (Finland)	3rd	6	4	0	2	40	19	+21
1999 (Sweden)	4th	5	3	0	2	24	13	+11
2001 (Latvia)	3rd	5	3	0	2	23	9	+14
2003 (Switzerland)	4th	5	3	0	2	23	15	+8
2005 (Singapore)	4th	5	2	0	3	27	39	-12
2007 (Denmark)	8th	5	1	1	3	23	27	-4
2009 (Sweden)	7th	5	2	1	2	34	38	-4
2011 (Switzerland)	5th	6	4	0	2	23	33	-10
2013 (Czech Republic)	6th	7	3	0	4	30	25	+5

== World championship results against other teams ==
Team	Pld	W	D	L	GF	GA	GD	BW	BL
Australia	1	1	0	0	7	3	4	7–3	
Austria	1	1	0	0	12	0	12	12–0	
Czech Republic	6	3	0	3	19	19	0	7–1	1–6
Denmark	1	0	0	1	5	8	−3		5–8
Finland	5	1	0	4	11	17	−6	5–2	1–4
Germany	1	1	0	0	10	1	9	10–1	
Hungary	1	1	0	0	5	0	5	5–0	
Japan	2	2	0	0	36	1	35	23–0	
Latvia	6	4	2	0	35	8	27	11–1	
Russia	1	1	0	0	11	4	7	11–4	
Slovakia	1	1	0	0	5	2	3	5–2	
Switzerland	7	2	0	5	19	35	−16	4–3	0–4
Sweden	8	1	0	7	11	83	−72	2–1	0–19
United States	2	2	0	0	27	10	17	16–3	

Legend: Norway is ahead in the series, The series is tied, Norway is behind in the series

== See also ==
- Norway men's national floorball team
