= Spain women's national floorball team =

Sports Team

Spain women's national floorball team is the national team of Spain. At the 2005 Women's World Floorball Championships in Singapore, the team finished eighth in the B-Division. At the 2007 Women's World Floorball Championships in Frederikshavn, Denmark, the team finished tenth in the B-Division.
