= Charlotte C. Holt =

American activist and lawyer

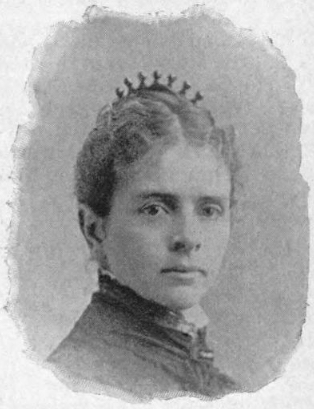
- Born: Charlotte Cushing; 1851 or 1852; New Orleans, Louisiana, US
- Died: July 17, 1931 (aged 79); Los Angeles, California, US
- Occupation(s): Activist, lawyer
- Spouses: Granville M. Holt (m. 1882; died 1899) Theodore Heineman (m. 1902)

Charlotte C. Holt (née Cushing; 1851 or 1852 – 1931) was an American activist and lawyer. She worked for the Protective Agency for Women and Children (PAWC) during the rise of the Labor Movement in Illinois. After she became a lawyer, she focused on expanding the rights of working-class women and children, and she helped to found the Legal Aid Society of Los Angeles.

== Biography ==
Charlotte Cushing was born in New Orleans, Louisiana to John C. and Charlotte Waddington Cushing, and educated at Chicago High School. Her father died when she was eleven, and she worked after school from a young age in order to help her mother support her siblings. In 1882, at the age of 30, she married a salesman named Granville Holt.

After a series of tragedies, including the deaths of her sister and mother, and her husband's suicide in 1899, Holt and her sister's children moved to California. There, she married a widowed scientist named Theodore Heineman in 1902.

The Protective Agency for Women and Children was founded in 1886, and Holt was appointed as a supervisor. With help from PAWC associates, board members, and volunteers, she listened to workers' grievances and investigated their cases. Holt was considered a radical member of the PAWC, as she adopted anarchist beliefs and questioned the ethics of religion and marriage. Eventually she resigned from her paid position as an agent of the PAWC (but continued volunteering with it) and pursued a career in law. She earned her law license in 1893.

Once licensed, Holt primarily focused on children's rights. She was one of the women to help establish the first juvenile court system in the country, the Cook County Juvenile Court.

After moving to Los Angeles, Holt helped found the Legal Aid Society of Los Angeles. She had originally aimed for the Legal Aid Society to specialize in workingwomen's and children's investigations and court cases, but male lawyers involved in the Society's creation decided to appoint a man named Reynold E. Blight as chair, and that focus was lost; workingwomen's and children's cases were still handled, but so were the cases of workingmen.

She died in Los Angeles on July 17, 1931.
