= Georgia women's national floorball team =

National Woman's Football Team of Georgia

Georgia women's national floorball team is the national team of Georgia in floorball. The team participated in the Qualification to the B-Division for the 2009 Floorball Women's World Championship. The qualifiers were held in Idrija, Slovenia. The team did not advance out of qualifiers.
