= Finland women's national floorball team =

- Founded: 1992
- IFF Ranking: 3rd (2025)
- Championships: : World Championships (1999, 2001)

Finland women's national floorball team (Finnish: Suomen naisten salibandymaajoukkue) is the national team of Finland.

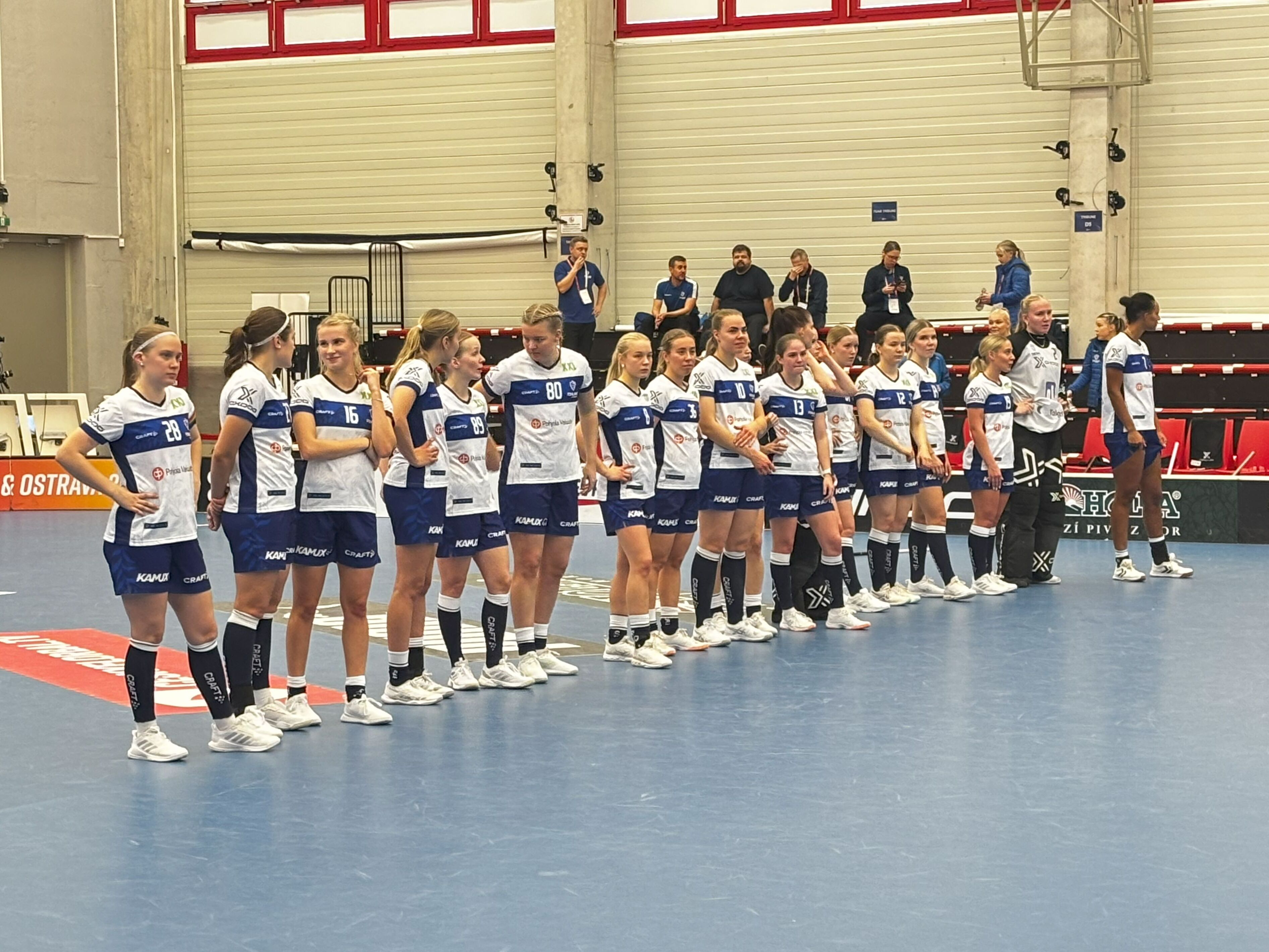
The Finnish national team at the 2024 Euro Floorball Tour

The team won two World Championship titles in 1999 and 2001. It is the only national team to have won a medal at every European and World Championship. As such, Finland is the second most successful national team, behind Sweden and ahead of Switzerland. In the IFF World Ranking, they are third (behind Czech Republic and ahead of Sweden), after finishing second and third at the last two championships in 2023 and 2025.

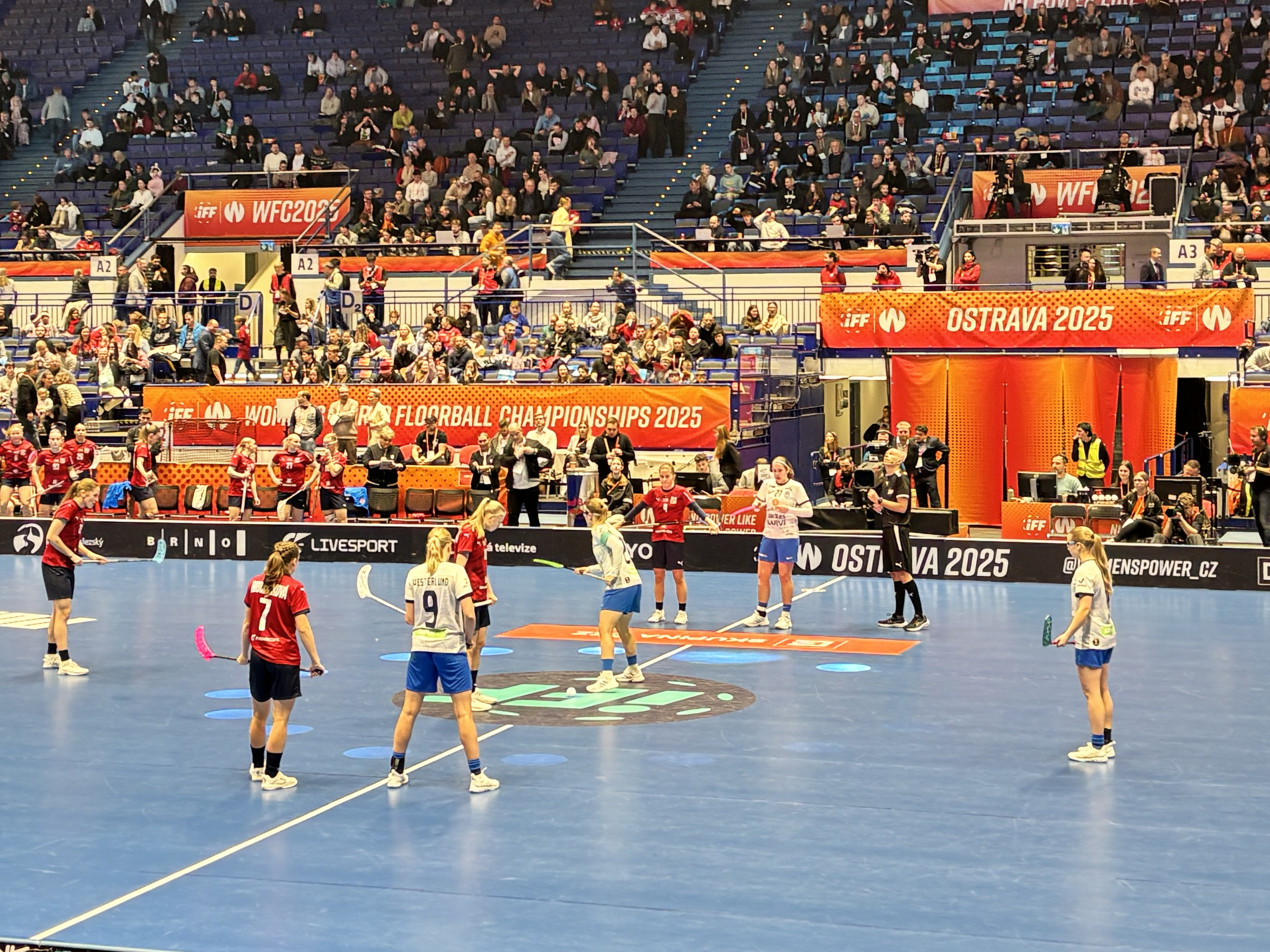
Players of the Finnish national team (in white) in the 2025 World Championship semifinals against Czechia

== World Championships ==
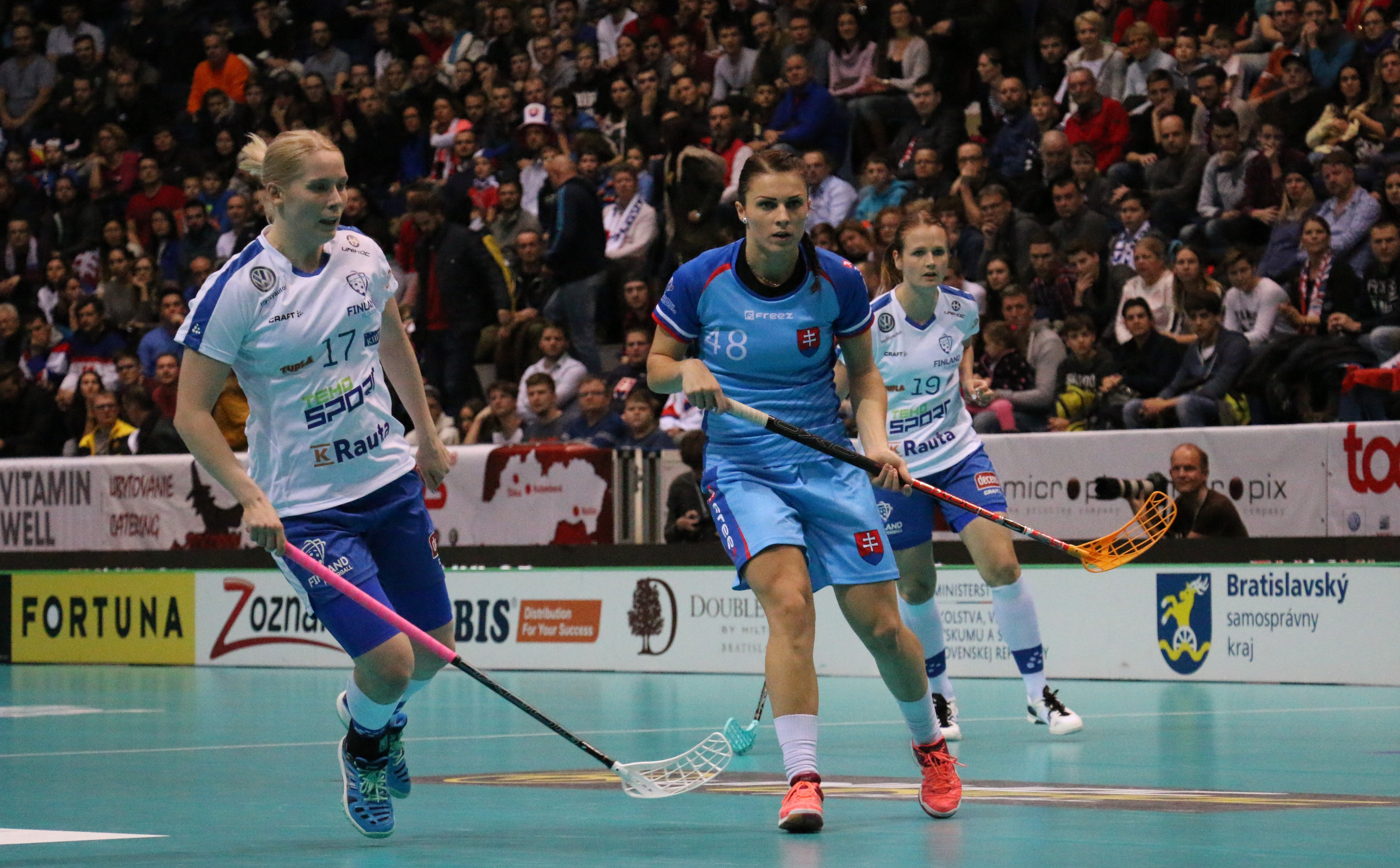
Players of the Finnish national team (in white) at the 2017 World Championship

Year	Hosting Country	Rank	Final match
1997	Finland	2nd place	Sweden 2–4
1999	Sweden	1st place	Switzerland 3–1
2001	Latvia	1st place	Sweden 2–0
2003	Switzerland	3rd place	Norway 4–2
2005	Singapore	2nd place	Switzerland 3–4
2007	Denmark	2nd place	Sweden 3–7
2009	Sweden	3rd place	Czech Republic 3–1
2011	Switzerland	2nd place	Sweden 2–4
2013	Czech Republic	2nd place	Sweden 1–5
2015	Finland	2nd place	Sweden 4–5 SO
2017	Slovakia	2nd place	Sweden 5–6 SO
2019	Switzerland	3rd place	Czech Republic 5–4 OT
2021	Sweden	2nd place	Sweden 3–4 OT
2023	Singapore	2nd place	Sweden 6–4
2025	Czech Republic	3rd place	Sweden 6–4
2027	Finland		

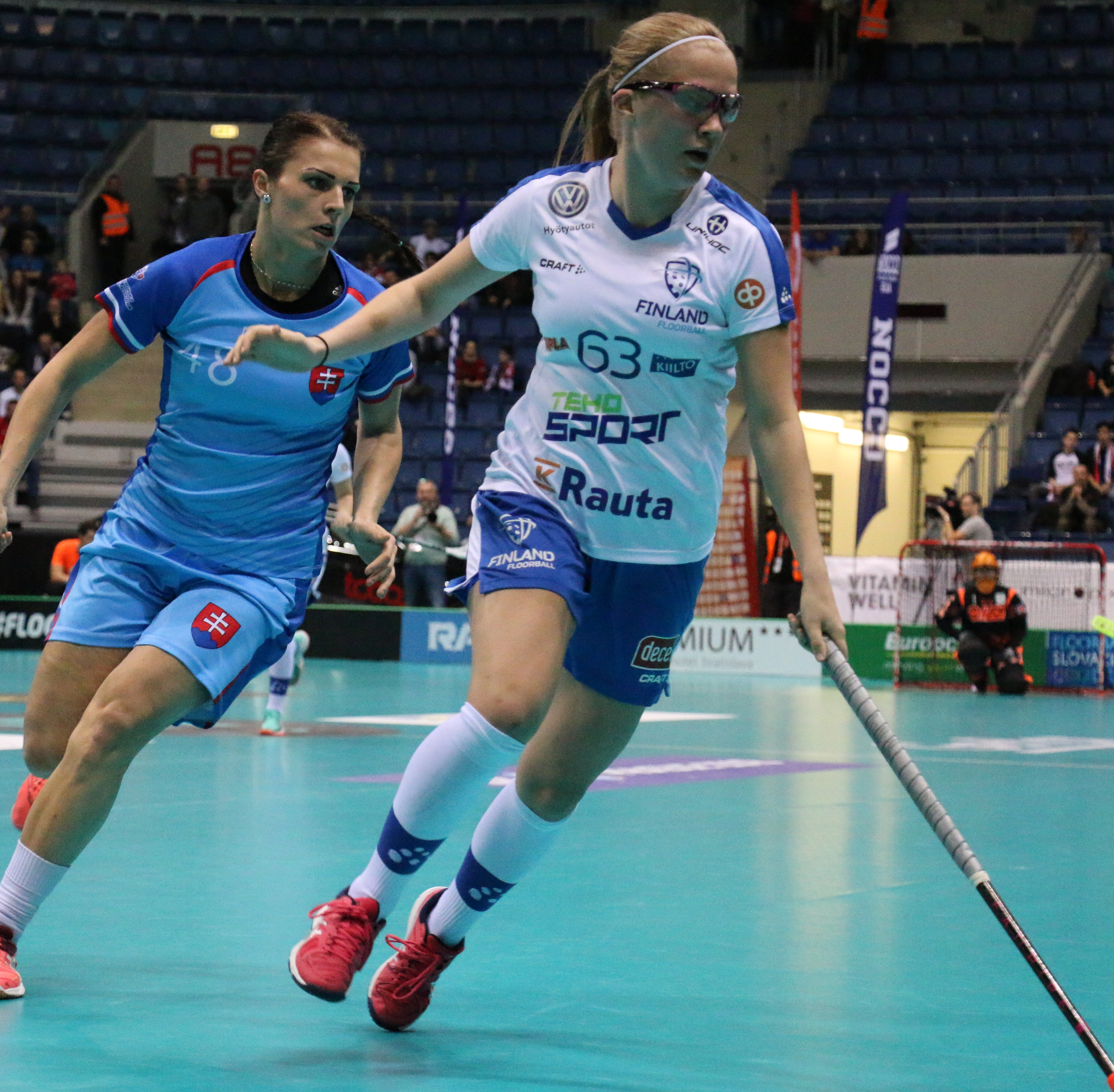
Finland's most successful women's floorball player is Veera Kauppi

Medal record
Medal	Won	Year(s)
1st place, gold medalist(s)	2	1999, 2001
2nd place, silver medalist(s)	9	1997, 2005, 2007, 2011, 2013, 2015, 2017, 2021, 2023
3rd place, bronze medalist(s)	4	2003, 2009, 2019, 2025

== World Games ==
Year	Hosting Country	Rank	Final match
2025	China	1st place	Sweden 3–2

== European Championships ==
Year	Hosting Country	Rank	Final match
1995	Switzerland	3rd place	Switzerland 3–2

== All-time world championships results ==
Year	Position	GP	W	D	L	GF	GA	+/-
1997 (Finland)	2nd	6	5	0	1	53	10	+43
1999 (Sweden)	1st	5	4	0	1	21	6	+15
2001 (Latvia)	1st	5	5	0	0	31	4	+27
2003 (Switzerland)	3rd	5	4	0	1	31	10	+21
2005 (Singapore)	2nd	5	3	0	2	24	14	+10
2007 (Denmark)	2nd	6	5	0	1	44	11	+33
2009 (Sweden)	3rd	6	4	0	2	28	21	+7
2011 (Switzerland)	2nd	6	5	0	1	47	8	+39
2013 (Czech Republic)	2nd	6	4	0	2	32	20	+12
2015 (Finland)	2nd	6	5	0	1	49	15	+34
2017 (Slovakia)	2nd	6	5	0	1	41	12	+29
2021 (Sweden)	2nd	6	5	0	1	47	19	+28
Total:	12/12	62	49	0	13	401	131	+270

== See also ==
- Finland men's national floorball team
- Finland women's national under-19 floorball team
