= 2015 Women's World Floorball Championships =

Floorball competition

Tournament details
- Host country: Finland
- Venues: 2 (in 1 host city)
- Dates: 4–12 December
- Teams: 16

Final positions
- Champions: Sweden
- Runners-up: Finland
- Third place: Switzerland

Tournament statistics
- Matches played: 48
- Goals scored: 472 (9.83 per match)
- Attendance: 36,147 (753 per match)
- Scoring leader(s): (Denmark) Cecilia Di Nardo (18)

The 2015 Women's World Floorball Championships is the tenth World Championships in women's floorball. The tournament took place in Tampere in Finland in December 2015. Sixteen teams participated.

Sweden won the tournament defeating Finland, 5-4, in the final game following a penalty shootout.

== Qualification ==
All teams, apart from the host country (Finland), will have to qualify for the Final Round via the qualifications, and there will be a total of 5 qualification groups - one in the Americas, one in Asia-Oceania and three in Europe. For Sweden, this will be the first time that they have ever had to participate in any qualification event in any age group. France and New Zealand will be participating in the women's event for the first-ever time, while Great Britain are making a return after a 14-year absence.

	Date	Venue	Vacancies	Qualified
European Qualification 1	4 – 8 February 2015	(Poland) Poznań	4	Sweden; Poland; Germany; Netherlands
European Qualification 2	3 – 7 February 2015	(Latvia) Valmiera	3	Switzerland; Latvia; Denmark
European Qualification 3	4 – 8 February 2015	(Slovakia) Nitra	4	Czech Republic; Slovakia; Norway; Russia
Asia and Oceania Qualification	23 – 25 January 2015	(Australia) Pakenham	3	Japan; Singapore; Australia
Americas Qualification	6 – 7 February 2015	(Canada) Markham	1	United States
Total			15	

== Venues ==
Tampere	Tampere
Hakametsä Ice Hall; Capacity: 7,300	Tampere Arena; Capacity: 2,500

== Preliminary round ==
Team advanced to quarter-finals
Team advanced to playoff round
Team advanced to 13th-16th place playoff

=== Group A ===
Team	Pld	W	D	L	GF	GA	GD	Pts
Finland	3	3	0	0	25	7	+18	6
Switzerland	3	2	0	1	25	10	+15	4
Poland	3	1	0	2	9	19	−10	2
Norway	3	0	0	3	4	27	−23	0

4 December 2015; 12:30	Poland	3–12 (2–2, 1–6, 0–4)	Switzerland	Tampere Arena, Tampere; Attendance: 110

Mariola Szarmach
Goalies
Monika Schmid

Magdalen Siuta – 02:01	1–0
	1–1	04:07 – Nina Bartschi
Malgorzata Pazio – 08:50	2–1
	2–2	17:01 – Ladina Sgier
	2–3	20:16 – Nina Bartschi
Honorata Bialy – 22:26	3–3
	3–4	23:20 – Corin Ruttimann
	3–5	23:58 – Celine Chalverat
	3–6	33:37 – Nina Bartschi
	3–7	35:05 – Flurina Marti
	3–8	35:49 – Sonja Putzi
	3–9	51:20 – Manuela Dominioni
	3–10	53:09 – Michelle Wiki
	3–11	54:40 – Corin Ruttimann
	3–12	57:06 – Corin Ruttimann

21
Shots
39

4 December 2015; 18:15	Norway	1–14 (1–2, 0–6, 0–6)	Finland	Hakametsä Ice Hall, Tampere; Attendance: 2559

5 December 2015; 14:00	Poland	4–2 (2–1, 0–1, 2–0)	Norway	Tampere Arena, Tampere; Attendance: 102

5 December 2015; 17:00	Switzerland	4–6 (1–1, 1–3, 2–2)	Finland	Hakametsä Ice Hall, Tampere; Attendance: 3476

6 December 2015; 16:15	Switzerland	9–1 (2–0, 4–1, 3–0)	Norway	Hakametsä Ice Hall, Tampere; Attendance: 322

7 December 2015; 18:15	Finland	5–2 (2–2, 3–0, 0–0)	Poland	Hakametsä Ice Hall, Tampere; Attendance: 2049

=== Group B ===
Team	Pld	W	D	L	GF	GA	GD	Pts
Sweden	3	3	0	0	40	3	+37	6
Czech Republic	3	2	0	1	26	20	+6	4
Latvia	3	0	1	2	5	25	−20	1
Germany	3	0	1	2	5	28	−23	1

4 December 2015; 15:30	Germany	1–16 (0–4, 0–4, 1–8)	Sweden	Hakametsä Ice Hall, Tampere; Attendance: 222

5 December 2015; 11:00	Latvia	2–15 (2–4, 0–5, 0–6)	Czech Republic	Hakametsä Ice Hall, Tampere; Attendance: 207

6 December 2015; 13:15	Germany	3–3 (0–3, 2–0, 1–0)	Latvia	Hakametsä Ice Hall, Tampere; Attendance: 160

6 December 2015; 19:15	Sweden	17–2 (4–1, 5–1, 8–0)	Czech Republic	Hakametsä Ice Hall, Tampere; Attendance: 448

7 December 2015; 12:30	Sweden	7–0 (2–0, 3–0, 2–0)	Latvia	Hakametsä Ice Hall, Tampere; Attendance: 456

7 December 2015; 15:30	Czech Republic	9–1 (1–0, 4–1, 4–0)	Germany	Hakametsä Ice Hall, Tampere; Attendance: 280

=== Group C ===
Team	Pld	W	D	L	GF	GA	GD	Pts
Denmark	3	3	0	0	19	11	+8	6
Australia	3	1	0	2	15	18	−3	2
Singapore	3	1	0	2	13	15	−2	2
Japan	3	1	0	2	13	16	−3	2

4 December 2015; 15:30	Japan	3–5 (1–1, 0–1, 2–3)	Denmark	Tampere Arena, Tampere; Attendance: 117

5 December 2015; 11:00	Singapore	5–4 (2–0, 1–4, 2–0)	Australia	Tampere Arena, Tampere; Attendance: 117

6 December 2015; 11:00	Japan	4–3 (2–0, 0–0, 2–3)	Singapore	Tampere Arena, Tampere; Attendance: 89

6 December 2015; 14:00	Denmark	7–3 (1–0, 3–0, 3–3)	Australia	Tampere Arena, Tampere; Attendance: 120

7 December 2015; 12:30	Denmark	7–5 (4–2, 1–1, 2–2)	Singapore	Tampere Arena, Tampere; Attendance: 111

7 December 2015; 15:30	Australia	8–6 (1–1, 2–2, 5–3)	Japan	Tampere Arena, Tampere; Attendance: 153

=== Group D ===
Team	Pld	W	D	L	GF	GA	GD	Pts
Slovakia	3	3	0	0	32	5	+27	6
Russia	3	2	0	1	19	10	+9	4
United States	3	1	0	2	13	28	−15	2
Netherlands	3	0	0	3	7	28	−21	0

4 December 2015; 12:30	Slovakia	4–2 (2–1, 1–0, 1–1)	Russia	Hakametsä Ice Hall, Tampere; Attendance: 154

4 December 2015; 18:30	United States	7–4 (1–1, 3–2, 3–1)	Netherlands	Tampere Arena, Tampere; Attendance: 115

Brandee Gomez	Goalies	Lidwien Reehuis

5 December 2015; 14:00	Slovakia	15–2 (3–2, 2–0, 10–0)	United States	Hakametsä Ice Hall, Tampere; Attendance: 517

5 December 2015; 17:00	Russia	8–2 (3–0, 3–0, 2–2)	Netherlands	Tampere Arena, Tampere; Attendance: 98

6 December 2015; 10:45	Netherlands	1–13 (1–7, 0–5, 0–1)	Slovakia	Hakametsä Ice Hall, Tampere; Attendance: 198

7 December 2015; 18:30	Russia	9–4 (4–1, 2–2, 3–1)	United States	Tampere Arena, Tampere; Attendance: 97

== Knockout stage ==
Playoff round 8 December
Germany (p.s.o.)	2 (2)
Denmark	2 (1)
Poland	4
Russia	1
Latvia	10
Australia	3
Norway	2
Slovakia	4

Quarterfinals; 9–10 December
Finland	16
Germany	0
Czech Republic	8
Poland	2
Switzerland	9
Latvia	2
Sweden	15
Slovakia	1

Semifinals; 11 December
Finland	4
Czech Republic	3
Switzerland	3
Sweden	7

Final; 12 December
Finland	4 (4)
Sweden (p.s.o.)	4 (5)
Third place
Switzerland	5
Czech Republic	4

=== Playoff round ===
8 December 2015; 09:30	Latvia	10–3 (4–0, 2–1, 4–2)	Australia	Hakametsä Ice Hall, Tampere; Attendance: 212

8 December 2015; 12:30	Germany	3–2 PSO (0–0, 1–2, 1–0); 0–0 OT; 2–1 PSO	Denmark	Hakametsä Ice Hall, Tampere; Attendance: 205

8 December 2015; 15:30	Norway	2–4 (1–1, 0–0, 1–3)	Slovakia	Hakametsä Ice Hall, Tampere; Attendance: 195

8 December 2015; 18:30	Poland	4–1 (2–0, 1–0, 1–1)	Russia	Hakametsä Ice Hall, Tampere; Attendance: 167

=== Quarterfinals ===
9 December 2015; 12:30	Switzerland	9–2 (3–0, 4–0, 2–2)	Latvia	Hakametsä Ice Hall, Tampere; Attendance: 168

9 December 2015; 15:30	Czech Republic	8–2 (3–2, 3–0, 2–0)	Poland	Hakametsä Ice Hall, Tampere; Attendance: 202

9 December 2015; 18:15	Finland	16–0 (4–0, 10–0, 2–0)	Germany	Hakametsä Ice Hall, Tampere; Attendance: 2312

10 December 2015; 18:30	Sweden	15–1 (5–0, 5–1, 5–0)	Slovakia	Hakametsä Ice Hall, Tampere; Attendance: 460

=== Semifinals ===
11 December 2015; 17:45	Finland	4–3 (1–0, 0–2, 3–1)	Czech Republic	Hakametsä Ice Hall, Tampere; Attendance: 4676

11 December 2015; 20:15	Sweden	7–3 (1–1, 3–1, 3–1)	Switzerland	Hakametsä Ice Hall, Tampere; Attendance: 3034

=== Bronze medal game ===
12 December 2015; 12:30	Switzerland	5–4 (0–1, 4–0, 1–3)	Czech Republic	Hakametsä Ice Hall, Tampere; Attendance: 4023

=== Gold medal game ===
12 December 2015; 15:20	Sweden	5–4 PSO (1–2, 3–1, 0–1); 0–0 OT; 3–2 PSO	Finland	Hakametsä Ice Hall, Tampere; Attendance: 6517

Emelie Frisk
Goalies
Jonna Mäkelä

Helin – 06:04	1–0
	1–1	11:29 – Ukkonen (Kauppi) (PP)
	1–2	17:44 – Eskelinen
Eiremo (Wickström) – 22:34	2–2
	2–3	28:36 – Lirkki (Hannonen)
Wibron – 33:48	3–3
Larsson (Karlsson) – 35:00	4–3
	4–4	41:00 – Kujala

== Placement round ==
=== 13th–16th place ===
8 December 2015; 15:30	United States	10–2 (1–1, 2–1, 7–0)	Japan	Tampere Arena, Tampere; Attendance: 63

8 December 2015; 18:30	Singapore	3–4 (1–0, 0–3, 2–1)	Netherlands	Tampere Arena, Tampere; Attendance: 53

=== 9th–12th place ===
9 December 2015; 12:30	Australia	1–11 (1–0, 0–4, 0–7)	Norway	Tampere Arena, Tampere; Attendance: 102

9 December 2015; 15:30	Russia	6–7 OT (1–1, 1–2, 4–3); 0–1 OT	Denmark	Tampere Arena, Tampere; Attendance: 61

=== 5th–8th place ===
11 December 2015; 10:00	Germany	5–2 (3–1, 0–0, 2–1)	Poland	Hakametsä Ice Hall, Tampere; Attendance: 412

11 December 2015; 13:00	Slovakia	3–4 PSO (1–0, 1–1, 1–2); 0–0 OT; 2–3 PSO	Latvia	Hakametsä Ice Hall, Tampere; Attendance: 196

=== 15th place ===
10 December 2015; 12:30	Japan	5–4 OT (1–1, 1–1, 2–2); 1–0 OT	Singapore	Tampere Arena, Tampere; Attendance: 52

=== 13th place ===
10 December 2015; 09:30	United States	7–1 (3–0, 1–0, 3–1)	Netherlands	Hakametsä Ice Hall, Tampere; Attendance: 110

=== 11th place ===
10 December 2015; 12:30	Australia	4–14 (1–3, 1–4, 2–7)	Russia	Hakametsä Ice Hall, Tampere; Attendance: 147

=== 9th place ===
10 December 2015; 15:30	Norway	2–0 (1–0, 1–0, 0–0)	Denmark	Hakametsä Ice Hall, Tampere; Attendance: 207

=== 7th place ===
12 December 2015; 09:30	Poland	2–0 (1–0, 0–0, 1–0)	Slovakia	Tampere Arena, Tampere; Attendance: 74

=== 5th place ===
12 December 2015; 09:30	Germany	2–5 (1–1, 1–2, 0–2)	Latvia	Hakametsä Ice Hall, Tampere; Attendance: 222

== Statistics ==
=== Final ranking ===
Gold medal	Sweden
Silver medal	Finland
Bronze medal	Switzerland
4	Czech Republic
5	Latvia
6	Germany
7	Poland
8	Slovakia
9	Norway
10	Denmark
11	Russia
12	Australia
13	United States
14	Netherlands
15	Japan
16	Singapore
