= Switzerland women's national floorball team =

- IFF Ranking: 1st (2025)

Switzerland women's national floorball team is the national team of Switzerland.

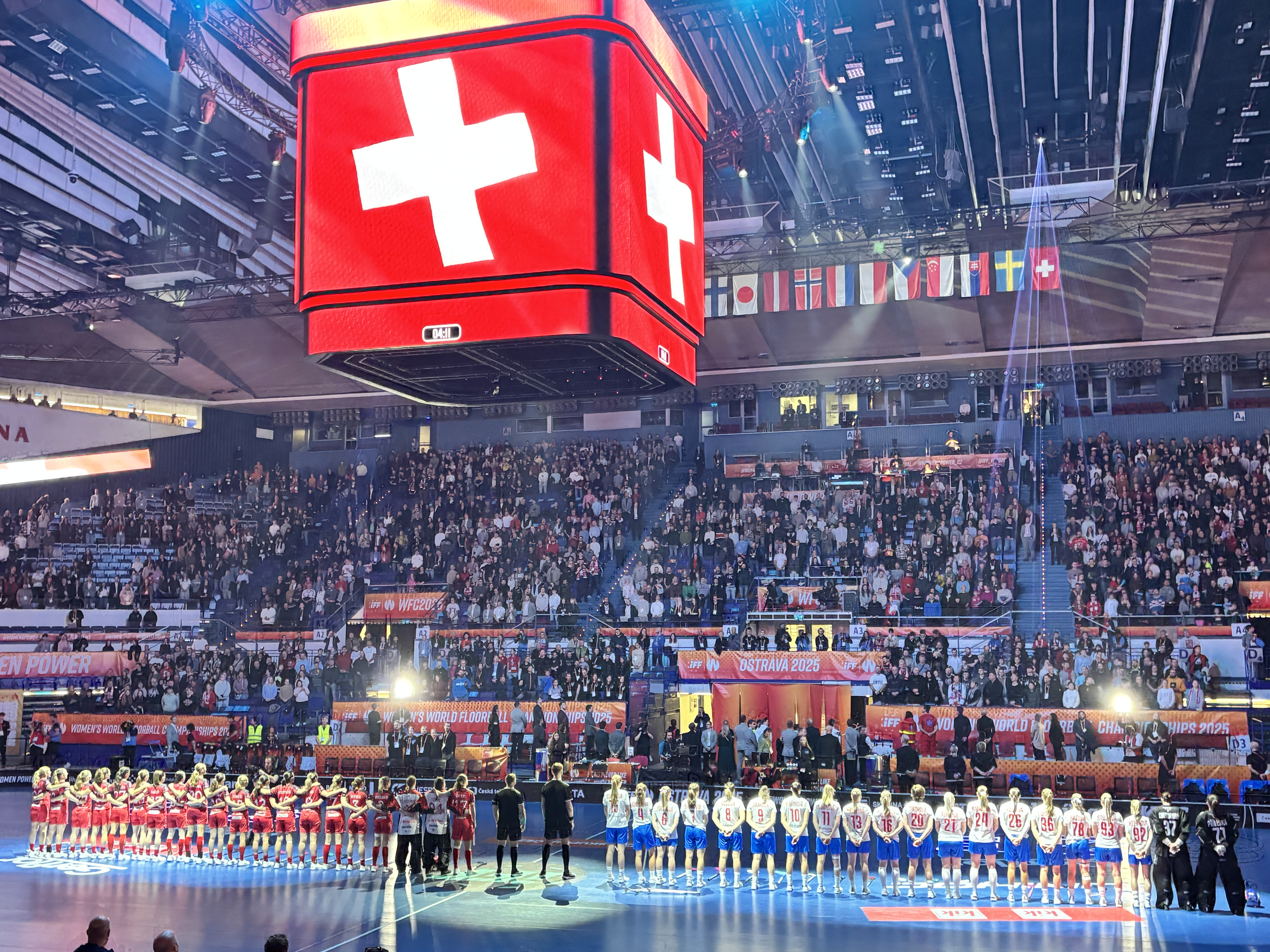
The Swiss national team (left) in the final of the 2025 World Championship

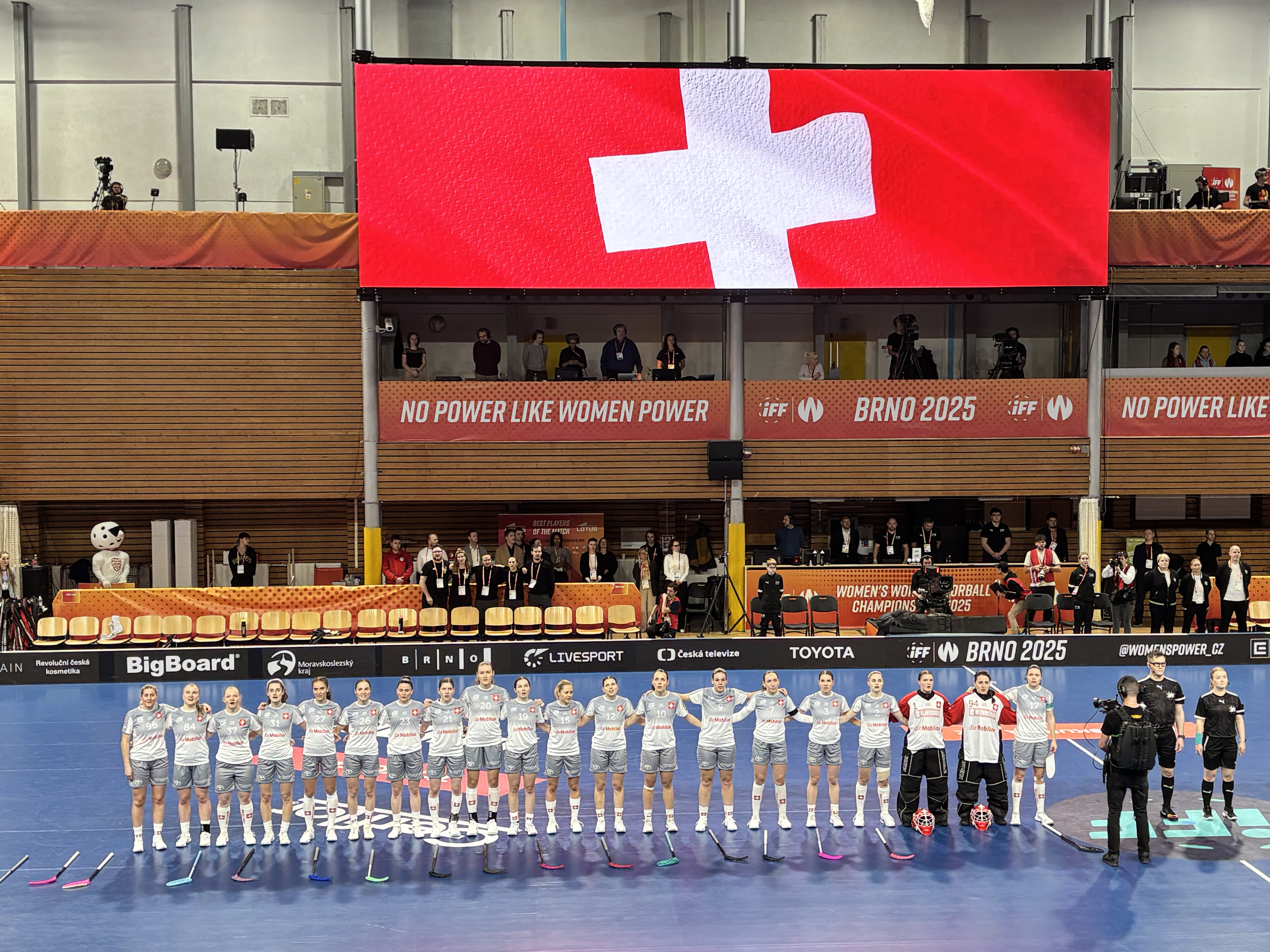
Swiss national team at 2025 World Championship

The team has participated in all World and European Championships to date. The Swiss won the World Championship titles in 2005 and 2025. This makes them the third most successful national team and one of only three teams to have won a gold medal (along with Sweden and Finland). They also have four silver medals from 1999, 2003, 2009, and 2019. At the inaugural women's floorball tournament at the 2025 World Games, they won the bronze medal.

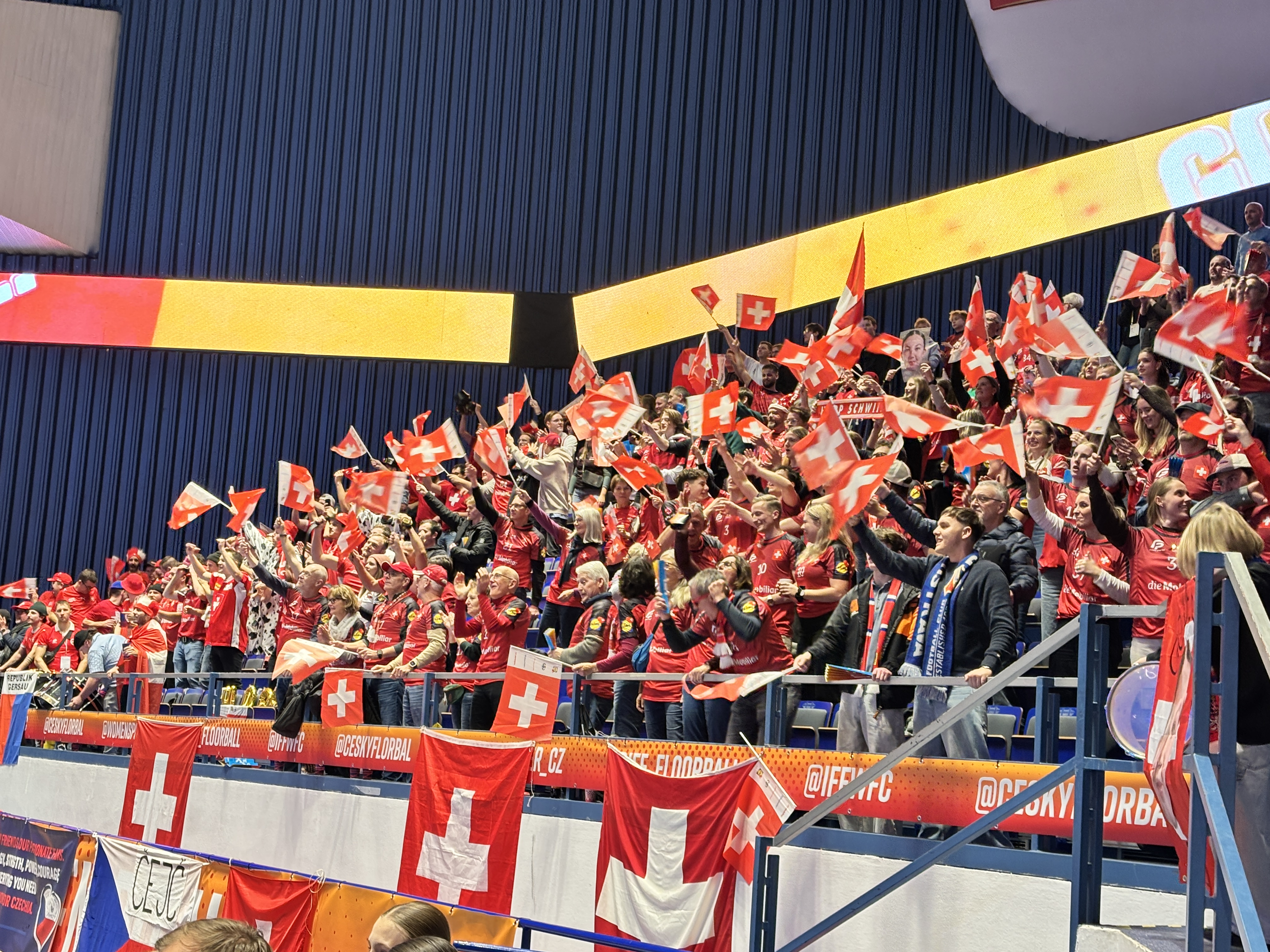
Fans of Swiss national team at 2025 World Championships

After finishing fourth and first in the last two championships in 2023 and 2025, they are currently ranked first in the IFF World Ranking (ahead of the Czech Republic).

== World Championships ==
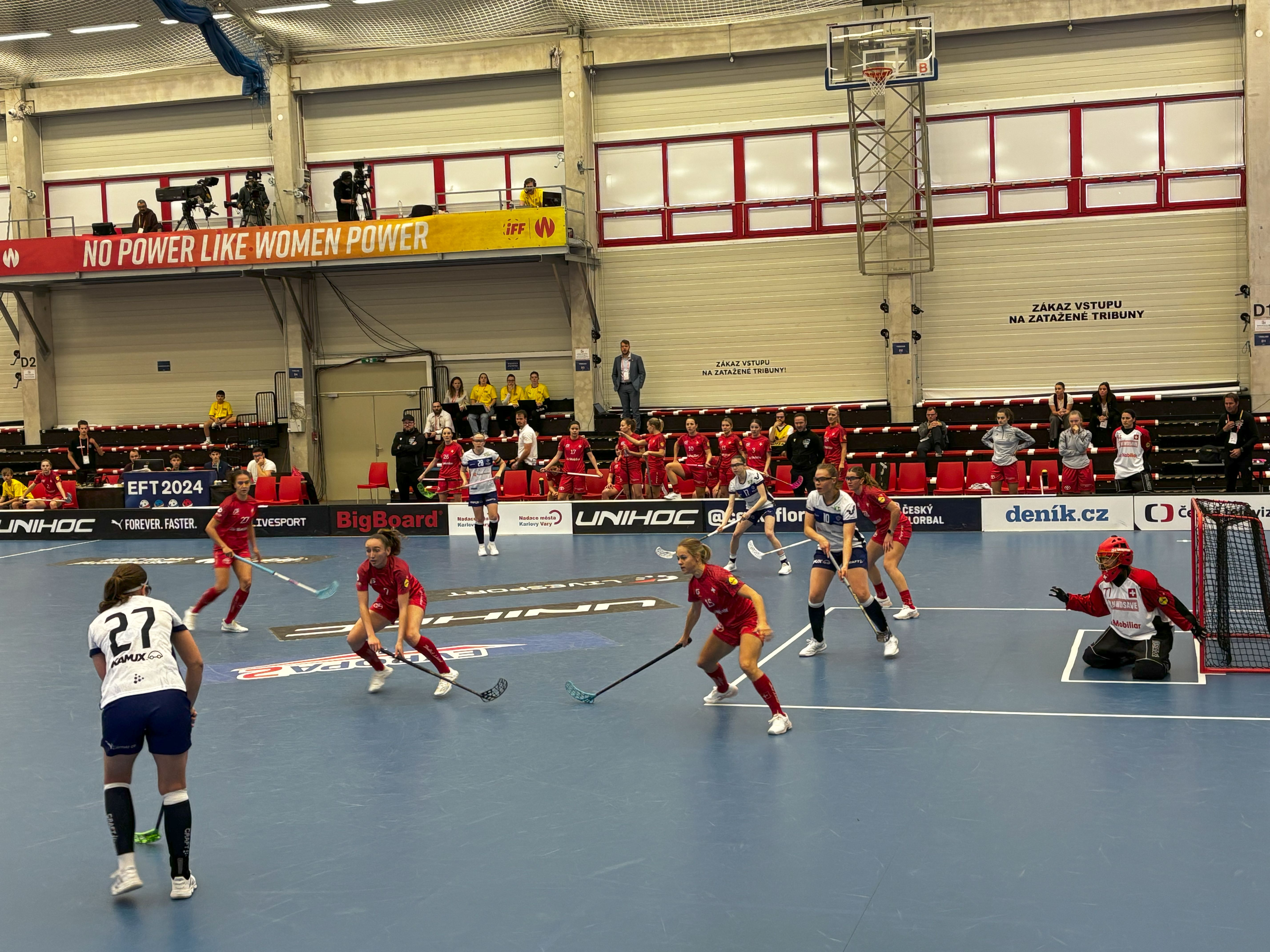
Players of the Swiss national team (in red) in a match against Finland at the Euro Floorball Tour in 2024

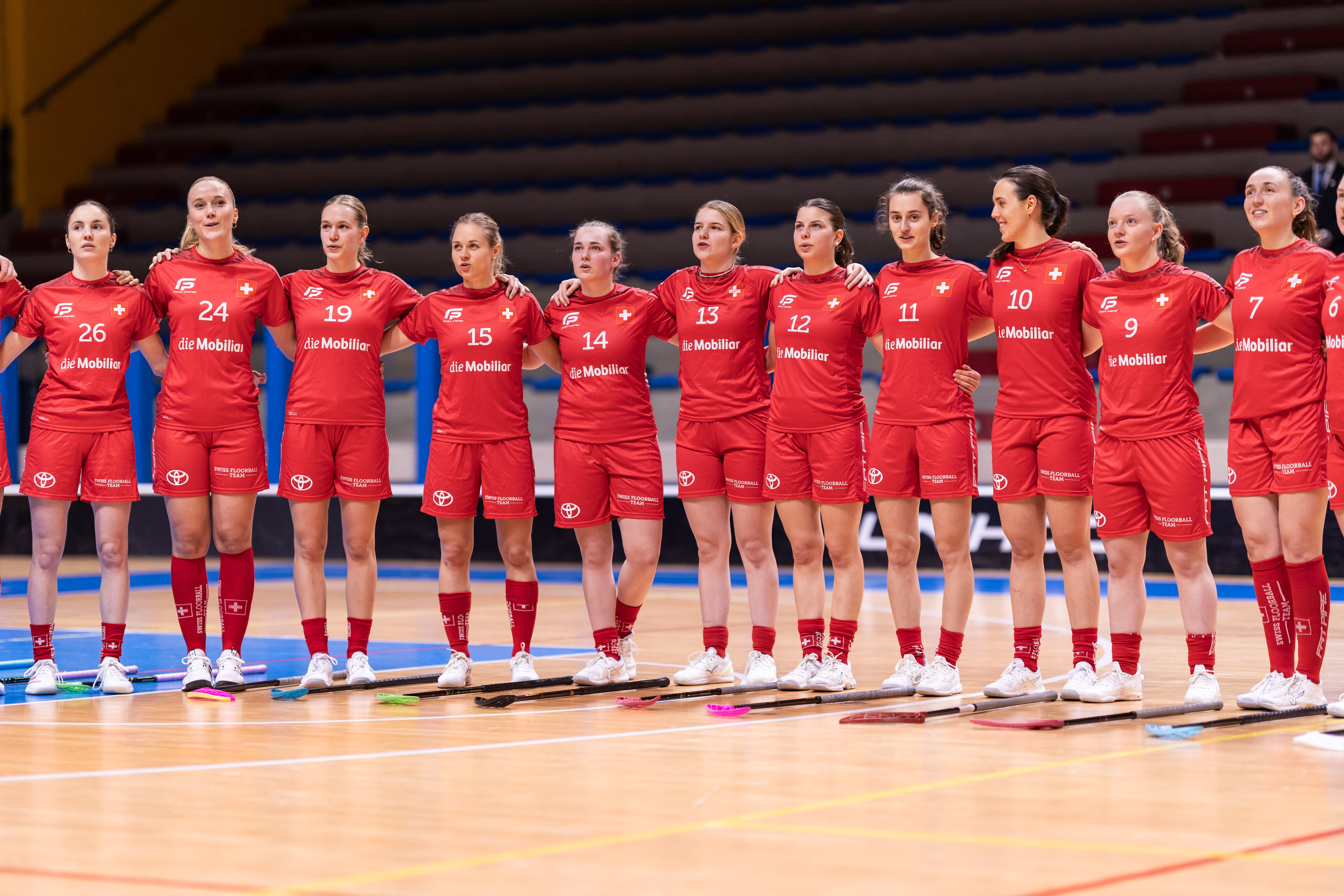
Swiss national team in the 2025 World Championship qualification

Year	Hosting Country	Rank	Final match
1997	Finland	4th place	Norway 3–4 SO
1999	Sweden	2nd place	Finland 1–3
2001	Latvia	4th place	Norway 3–4
2003	Switzerland	2nd place	Sweden 1–8
2005	Singapore	1st place	Finland 4–3
2007	Denmark	3rd place	Latvia 7–1
2009	Sweden	2nd place	Sweden 2–6
2011	Switzerland	4th place	Czech Republic 2–3
2013	Czech Republic	3rd place	Czech Republic 4–3 OT
2015	Finland	3rd place	Czech Republic 5–4
2017	Slovakia	3rd place	Czech Republic 3–2
2019	Switzerland	2nd place	Sweden 2–3 OT
2021	Sweden	3rd place	Czech Republic 5–2
2023	Singapore	4th place	Czech Republic 4–5
2025	Czech Republic	1st place	Czech Republic 2–0

Medal record
Medal	Won	Year(s)
1st place, gold medalist(s)	2	2005, 2025
2nd place, silver medalist(s)	4	1997, 2003, 2009, 2019
3rd place, bronze medalist(s)	5	2007, 2013, 2015, 2017, 2021

== World Games ==
Year	Hosting Country	Rank	Final match
2025	China	3rd place	Czech Republic 4–3

== European Championships ==
Year	Hosting Country	Rank	Final match
1995	Switzerland	4th place	Finland 2–3
