= South Korea women's national floorball team =

South Korea women's national floorball team is the national team of South Korea. At the 2013 Women's World Floorball Championships in Brno and Ostrava, Czech Republic, the team finished sixteenth.
