= 2013 Women's World Floorball Championships =

Floorball competition

Tournament details
- Host country: Czech Republic
- Venues: 2 (in 2 host cities)
- Dates: 7–15 December 2013
- Teams: 16

Final positions
- Champions: Sweden (6th title)
- Runners-up: Finland
- Third place: Switzerland

Tournament statistics
- Matches played: 48
- Goals scored: 472 (9.83 per match)
- Attendance: 43,806 (913 per match)
- Scoring leader(s): (Sweden) Anna Wijk (19 points)

Awards
- MVP: (Sweden) Sandra Mattsson

The 2013 Women's World Floorball Championships was the ninth World Championships in women's floorball. The tournament took place in Ostrava and Brno in Czech Republic in December 2013. Sixteen teams participated. Sweden won the tournament defeating Finland, 5-1, in the final-game.

== Qualification ==
| | Date | Venue | Vacancies | Qualified |
|---|---|---|---|---|
| 2011 World Championships | 4–11 December 2011 | (Switzerland) St. Gallen | 5 | Czech Republic; Finland; Norway; Sweden; Switzerland |
| European Qualification 1 | 29 January – 2 February 2013 | (Latvia) Valmiera | 4 | Denmark; Germany; Latvia; Slovakia |
| European Qualification 2 | 30 January – 3 February 2013 | (Poland) Babimost | 3 | Hungary; Poland; Russia |
| Asia and Oceania Qualification | 21–23 February 2013 | (South Korea) Pocheon | 3 | Australia; Japan; South Korea |
| Americas Qualification | 1–2 February 2013 | (Canada) Markham | 1 | Canada |
| Total | | | 16 | |

== Venues ==
| Ostrava | Brno |
| ČEZ Aréna; Capacity: 12,500 | Vodova Aréna; Capacity: 3,000 |

== Preliminary round ==
| Team advanced to quarter-finals |
| Team advanced to playoff round |
| Team advanced to 13th-16th place playoff |

=== Group A ===
| Team | Pld | W | D | L | GF | GA | GD | Pts |
|---|---|---|---|---|---|---|---|---|
| Sweden | 3 | 3 | 0 | 0 | 45 | 3 | +42 | 6 |
| Finland | 3 | 2 | 0 | 1 | 20 | 11 | +9 | 4 |
| Poland | 3 | 1 | 0 | 2 | 8 | 28 | −20 | 2 |
| Russia | 3 | 0 | 0 | 3 | 5 | 36 | −31 | 0 |

| 7 December 2013; 11:00 | Poland | 6–3 (1–0, 1–2, 4–1) | Russia | Vodova Aréna A, Brno; Attendance: 325 |

| Klaudia Jaczewska | Goalies | Nadezda Lapina; Uliana Veselova |
Karolina Dutkiewicz; Justyna Krzywak; Weronika Noga; Malgorzata Pazio; Agata Plechan; Maja Stenka / Goals / Maria Okulova (2); Liubov Serebryakova

| 7 December 2013; 14:00 | Sweden | 8–2 (0–0, 5–0, 3–2) | Finland | Vodova Aréna A, Brno; Attendance: 1,040 |

| Malin Marklund | Goalies | Jonna Makela; Laura Loisa |
Sandra Mattsson (3); Anna Jakobsson (2); Iza Rydfjäll; Anna Wijk; Victoria Wikström / Goals / Elina Kujala; Katri Luomaniemi

| 8 December 2013; 11:00 | Poland | 0–16 (0–4, 0–7, 0–5) | Sweden | Vodova Aréna A, Brno; Attendance: 372 |

| Mariola Szarmach | Goalies | Emelie Frisk |
Goals / Therese Karlsson (2); Sandra Mattsson (4); Amanda Larsson (2); Victoria Wikström (4); Emelie Lindström; Anna Wijk; Johanna Holmbom; Louise Wickström

| 8 December 2013; 14:00 | Russia | 1–9 (0–3, 1–3, 0–3) | Finland | Vodova Aréna A, Brno; Attendance: 486 |

| Nadezda Lapina; Uliana Veselova | Goalies | Laura Loisa |
Anastasiia Rodina / Goals / Alisa Pollanen (2); Hanna-Mari Uimonen (2); Kristiina Kauppila; Elina Kujala; Karoliina Kujala; Emmi Niemelä own goal

| 9 December 2013; 11:00 | Russia | 1–21 (1–7, 0–6, 0–8) | Sweden | Vodova Aréna A, Brno; Attendance: 1,092 |

| Uliana Veselova; Nadezda Lapina | Goalies | Malin Marklund |
Svetlana Viktorova / Goals / Anna Jakobsson (3); Anna Wijk (3); Amanda Larsson (2); Emelie Lindström (2); Iza Rydfjäll (2); Moa Tschöp (2); Louise Wickström (2); Sofie Andersson; Josefina Eiremo; Jenny Gustafsson; Johanna Holmbom; Sanna Scheer

| 9 December 2013; 17:00 | Finland | 9–2 (1–0, 2–1, 6–1) | Poland | Vodova Aréna A, Brno; Attendance: 367 |

| Laura Loisa | Goalies | Klaudia Jaczewska |
Eliisa Alanko (2); Elina Kujala (2); Marianne Hannonen; Katri Luomaniemi; Laura Mertsalmi; Emmi Niemelä; Alisa Pollanen / Goals / Katarzyna Fula; Justyna Krzywak

=== Group B ===
| Team | Pld | W | D | L | GF | GA | GD | Pts |
|---|---|---|---|---|---|---|---|---|
| Switzerland | 3 | 3 | 0 | 0 | 16 | 5 | +11 | 6 |
| Czech Republic | 3 | 2 | 0 | 1 | 19 | 4 | +15 | 4 |
| Norway | 3 | 1 | 0 | 2 | 11 | 12 | −1 | 2 |
| Latvia | 3 | 0 | 0 | 3 | 2 | 25 | −23 | 0 |

| 7 December 2013; 17:00 | Czech Republic | 6–1 (1–0, 3–1, 2–0) | Norway | Vodova Aréna A, Brno; Attendance: 2,435 |

| Jana Christianova | Goalies | Live Fosmark |
Nikola Cerna; Iveta Hyrslova; Hana Sladeckova; Dominika Steglova; Tereza Urbankova; Jana Vojackova / Goals / Elisabeth Torp

| 7 December 2013; 20:00 | Switzerland | 6–1 (1–0, 2–0, 3–1) | Latvia | Vodova Aréna A, Brno; Attendance: 294 |

| Helen Bircher | Goalies | Lauma Visnevska |
Michelle Wiki (2); Silvana Notzli; Sonja Putzi; Corin Rüttimann; Tanja Stella / Goals / Santa Torstere

| 8 December 2013; 17:00 | Czech Republic | 1–2 (1–1, 0–0, 0–1) | Switzerland | Vodova Aréna A, Brno; Attendance: 2,528 |

| Jana Christianova | Goalies | Monika Schmid |
Lucie Paulovicova / Goals / Silvana Notzli (2)

| 8 December 2013; 20:00 | Norway | 7–0 (5–0, 1–0, 1–0) | Latvia | Vodova Aréna A, Brno; Attendance: 267 |

| Charlotte Holt | Goalies | Lauma Visnevska |
Anette Berg (2); Henriette Knudsen; Marianne Nadim; Ida Karevold; Kristine Naess; Mia Osterhaug / Goals

| 9 December 2013; 14:00 | Norway | 3–6 (2–1, 0–2, 1–3) | Switzerland | Vodova Aréna A, Brno; Attendance: 364 |

| Charlotte Holt | Goalies | Helen Bircher |
Kristine Naess; Marie Amundsen / Goals / Michelle Wiki; Nina Bartschi; Seraina Ulber; Katrin Zwinggi; Margrit Scheidegger; Corin Rüttimann

| 9 December 2013; 20:00 | Latvia | 1–12 (0–7, 1–2, 0–3) | Czech Republic | Vodova Aréna A, Brno; Attendance: 1,572 |

=== Group C ===
| Team | Pld | W | D | L | GF | GA | GD | Pts |
|---|---|---|---|---|---|---|---|---|
| Slovakia | 3 | 3 | 0 | 0 | 31 | 3 | +28 | 6 |
| Australia | 3 | 2 | 0 | 1 | 21 | 15 | +6 | 4 |
| Hungary | 3 | 1 | 0 | 2 | 24 | 24 | 0 | 2 |
| South Korea | 3 | 0 | 0 | 3 | 4 | 38 | −34 | 0 |

| 7 December 2013; 13:00 | Australia | 10–7 (4–0, 4–2, 2–5) | Hungary | Vodova Aréna B, Brno; Attendance: 275 |

| Cien Pereira | Goalies | Flora Frischmann |
Jessica Laidler (4); Tash Glass (2); Phoebe Hamilton; Tara Keogh; Narelle Kihm; Charlotte Quaife / Goals / Liza Pecsenya (2); Anna Harmat; Réka Kovács; Timea Pintye; Brigitta Radacsi no scorer

| 7 December 2013; 19:00 | South Korea | 0–13 (0–5, 0–4, 0–4) | Slovakia | Vodova Aréna B, Brno; Attendance: 397 |

| Kyung A Ko; Sun Woo Lee | Goalies | Radka Mladenkova |
Goals / Dominika Sadecka (3); Michaela Sponiarova (3); Milota Hutirova (2); Miroslava Kaducakova (2); Alzbeta Durikova; Alexandra Ferencova; Lucia Kosturiakova

| 8 December 2013; 13:00 | Hungary | 1–11 (1–3, 0–6, 0–2) | Slovakia | Vodova Aréna B, Brno; Attendance: 381 |

| Brigitta Balla; Rita Miklos | Goalies | Alexandra Novakova |
Nicole Vertesi / Goals / Milota Hutirova; Alexandra Ferencova; Petra Tardikova; Alzbeta Durikova; Miroslava Kaducakova; Michaela Sponiarova(4); Natalia Broosova; Lucia Kosturiakova

| 8 December 2013; 16:00 | Australia | 9–1 (2–1, 3–0, 4–0) | South Korea | Vodova Aréna B, Brno; Attendance: 335 |

| Leith Woods | Goalies | Sun Won Lee; Kyung A Ko |
Phoebe Hamilton; Lisa Sampey; Fiona Cameron; Teresa Annese; Jessica Laidler; Tash Glass(2); Tara Keogh(2) / Goals / Kyung Eun Jung

| 9 December 2013; 10:00 | Slovakia | 7–2 (4–1, 2–1, 1–0) | Australia | Vodova Aréna B, Brno; Attendance: 731 |

Katarina Klapitova(3); Lucia Kosturiakova(3); Romana Janegova / Goals / Jessica Laidler (2)

| 9 December 2013; 19:00 | Hungary | 16–3 (5–2, 6–0, 5–1) | South Korea | Vodova Aréna B, Brno; Attendance: 178 |

=== Group D ===
| Team | Pld | W | D | L | GF | GA | GD | Pts |
|---|---|---|---|---|---|---|---|---|
| Germany | 3 | 3 | 0 | 0 | 23 | 5 | +18 | 6 |
| Denmark | 3 | 2 | 0 | 1 | 25 | 7 | +18 | 4 |
| Canada | 3 | 1 | 0 | 2 | 7 | 29 | −22 | 2 |
| Japan | 3 | 0 | 0 | 3 | 8 | 22 | −14 | 0 |

| 7 December 2013; 10:00 | Japan | 2–11 (1–4, 0–1, 1–6) | Denmark | Vodova Aréna B, Brno; Attendance: 173 |

| Chika Sato; Chisato Oyama | Goalies | Camilla Bjerregaard; Ida Christensen |
Midori Sawaguchi (2) / Goals / Helle Grønbech (2); Cecilia Di Nardo (2); Maria Olausson (2); Emma Vistisen (2); Caroline Christoffersen; Jasmin Damm; Jannie Østergaard Pedersen

| 7 December 2013; 16:00 | Germany | 14–0 (7–0, 4–0, 3–0) | Canada | Vodova Aréna B, Brno; Attendance: 407 |

| Indra Reck | Goalies | Jennifer Lynch |
Madeleine Heiskanen (4); Anne-Marie Mietz (4); Ina Jensen (3); Franziska Kuhlmann; Laura Neumann; Sara Patzelt / Goals

| 8 December 2013; 10:00 | Japan | 3–6 (2-4, 0-1, 1-1) | Germany | Vodova Aréna B, Brno; Attendance: 181 |

| Chisato Oyama; Chika Sato | Goalies | Indra Reck |
Yui Goto (2); Yui Takahashi / Goals / Laura Neumann; Pauline Baumgarten (2); Madeleine Heiskanen; Josephin Gacon; Franziska Kuhlmann

| 8 December 2013; 19:00 | Denmark | 12–2 (5–1, 3–0, 4–1) | Canada | Vodova Aréna B, Brno; Attendance: 218 |

| 9 December 2013; 13:00 | Canada | 5–3 (2–0, 2–1, 1–2) | Japan | Vodova Aréna B, Brno; Attendance: 185 |

| 9 December 2013; 16:00 | Denmark | 2–3 (0–0, 1–2, 1–1) | Germany | Vodova Aréna B, Brno; Attendance: 188 |

| Camilla Bjerregaard | Goalies | Indra Reck |
Caroline Christoffersen; Cecilia Di Nardo / Goals / Ina Jensen (3)

== Knockout stage ==
Playoffs; 10 December
Latvia | 4
Slovakia | 3
Poland | 7
Denmark | 4
Norway | 7
Australia | 3
Russia | 1
Germany | 2

Quarterfinals; 11–12 December
Sweden | 12
Latvia | 2
Czech Republic | 10
Poland | 1
Finland | 5
Norway | 2
Switzerland | 8
Germany | 0

Semifinals; 14 December
Sweden | 9
Czech Republic | 2
Finland | 6
Switzerland | 2

Final; 15 December
Sweden | 5
Finland | 1
Third place
Switzerland | 4
Czech Republic | 3

=== Playoff round ===
| 10 December 2013; 10:00 | Russia | 1–2; Report | Germany | Vodova Aréna A, Brno |

| 10 December 2013; 13:00 | Poland | 7–4; Report | Denmark | Vodova Aréna A, Brno |

| 10 December 2013; 16:00 | Norway | 7–3; Report | Australia | Vodova Aréna A, Brno |

| 10 December 2013; 19:00 | Latvia | 4–3; Report | Slovakia | Vodova Aréna A, Brno |

=== Quarterfinals ===
| 11 December 2013; 17:00 | Finland | 5–2; Report | Norway | ČEZ Aréna A, Ostrava |

Rantala – 24.01; Tikkanen – 32.30; Rantala – 42.21; Uimonen – 54.00; Kujala – 54.35 / Goals / 12.12 – Naess 45.27 – Farnes

| 11 December 2013; 20:00 | Sweden | 12–2; Report | Latvia | ČEZ Aréna A, Ostrava |

| 12 December 2013; 17:00 | Switzerland | 8–0; Report | Germany | ČEZ Aréna A, Ostrava |

| 12 December 2013; 20:00 | Czech Republic | 10–1; Report | Poland | ČEZ Aréna A, Ostrava |

=== Semifinals ===
| 14 December 2013; 14:00 | Switzerland | 2–6; Report | Finland | ČEZ Aréna A, Ostrava |

Notzli – 09.28 Ulber – 45.23 / Goals / 22.39 – K. Kujala; 35.10 – Luomaniemi; 35.26 – Rantala; 35.57 – E. Kujala; 38.07 – E. Kujala 59.12 – K. Kujala

| 14 December 2013; 17:00 | Sweden | 9–2; Report | Czech Republic | ČEZ Aréna A, Ostrava |

=== Bronze medal game ===
| 15 December 2013; 13:00 | Switzerland | 4–3 OT; Report | Czech Republic | ČEZ Aréna A, Ostrava |

=== Gold medal game ===
| 15 December 2013; 15:30 | Finland | 1–5; Report | Sweden | ČEZ Aréna A, Ostrava |

Rantala (PP) – 56.08 / Goals / 20.30 – Mattsson; 27.51 – Jakobsson; 49.43 – Jakobsson 57.27 – (EN) Jakobsson; 59.09 – Edberg

== Placement round ==
=== 13th–16th place ===
| 11 December 2013; 16:00 | Canada | 11–0; Report | South Korea | ČEZ Aréna B, Ostrava |

| 11 December 2013; 19:00 | Hungary | 5–3; Report | Japan | ČEZ Aréna B, Ostrava |

=== 9th–12th place ===
| 12 December 2013; 09:00 | Australia | 4–11; Report | Russia | ČEZ Aréna B, Ostrava |

| 12 December 2013; 19:00 | Denmark | 3–4 OT; Report | Slovakia | ČEZ Aréna B, Ostrava |

=== 5th–8th place ===
| 13 December 2013; 17:00 | Latvia | 9–0; Report | Poland | ČEZ Aréna A, Ostrava |

| 13 December 2013; 20:00 | Germany | 1–7; Report | Norway | ČEZ Aréna A, Ostrava |

=== 15th place game ===
| 12 December 2013; 11:00 | South Korea | 1–5; Report | Japan | ČEZ Aréna A, Ostrava |

=== 13th place game ===
| 12 December 2013; 14:00 | Canada | 6–5 OT; Report | Hungary | ČEZ Aréna A, Ostrava |

=== 11th place game ===
| 13 December 2013; 11:00 | Australia | 4–9; Report | Denmark | ČEZ Aréna A, Ostrava |

=== 9th place game ===
| 13 December 2013; 14:00 | Russia | 4–6; Report | Slovakia | ČEZ Aréna A, Ostrava |

=== 7th place game ===
| 14 December 2013; 11:00 | Poland | 3–1; Report | Germany | ČEZ Aréna A, Ostrava |

=== 5th place game ===
| 15 December 2013; 10:00 | Latvia | 4–3 OT; Report | Norway | ČEZ Aréna A, Ostrava |

== Statistics ==
=== Tournament awards ===
- Tournament All-Star Team:
  - Goalkeeper: (Czech Republic) Jana Christianova
  - Defenders: (Sweden) Moa Tschöp, (Switzerland) Silvana Nötzli
  - Forwards: (Sweden) Emelie Lindström, (Sweden) Sandra Mattsson, (Sweden) Anna Wijk
  - ASICS Golden Shoe MVP: (Sweden) Sandra Mattsson

=== Final ranking ===
| Gold medal | Sweden |
| Silver medal | Finland |
| Bronze medal | Switzerland |
| 4 | Czech Republic |
| 5 | Latvia |
| 6 | Norway |
| 7 | Poland |
| 8 | Germany |
| 9 | Slovakia |
| 10 | Russia |
| 11 | Denmark |
| 12 | Australia |
| 13 | Canada |
| 14 | Hungary |
| 15 | Japan |
| 16 | South Korea |
