= Australia women's national floorball team =

- IFF Ranking: 16th (2025)

Australia women's national floorball team is the national team of Australia.

At the 1999 Women's World Floorball Championships in Borlänge, Sweden, the team finished second in the B-Division.

At the 2001 Women's World Floorball Championships in Riga, Latvia, the team finished sixth in the B-Division.

At the 2003 Women's World Floorball Championships in Germany, the team finished eighth in the B-Division.

At the 2005 Women's World Floorball Championships in Singapore, the team finished fifth in the B-Division.

At the 2007 Women's World Floorball Championships in Frederikshavn, Denmark, the team finished fifth in the B-Division.

At the 2009 Women's World Floorball Championships in Västerås, Sweden, the team won B-Division, and finished eleventh.

At the 2011 Women's World Floorball Championships in St Gallen, Switzerland, the team finished fifteenth.

At the 2013 Women's World Floorball Championships in Brno and Ostrava, Czech Republic, the team finished twelfth.
