= Russia women's national floorball team =

Russia women's national floorball team is the national team of Russia. At the 1997 Women's World Floorball Championships in Godby and Mariehamn, Åland, Finland, the team finished fifth. At the 1999 Women's World Floorball Championships in Borlänge, Sweden, the team withdrew from the competition and were relegated to the B-Division. At the 2001 Women's World Floorball Championships in Riga, Latvia, the team finished first in the B-Division and were elevated to the A-Division. At the 2003 Women's World Floorball Championships in Germany, the team finished fifth in the A-Division. At the 2005 Women's World Floorball Championships in Singapore, the team finished sixth in the A-Division. At the 2007 Women's World Floorball Championships in Frederikshavn, Denmark, the team finished seventh in the A-Division. At the 2013 Women's World Floorball Championships in Brno and Ostrava, Czech Republic, the team finished tenth.
