= 2007 Women's World Floorball Championships =

Floorball competition

A-Division Finals
- Official logo of the 2007 Women's World Floorball Championships

Tournament details
- Host country: Denmark
- Venue(s): 1 (in 1 host city)
- Dates: May 12–19, 2007
- Teams: 10

Final positions
- Champions: Sweden

Tournament statistics
- Matches played: 27
- Goals scored: 301 (11.15 per match)
- Attendance: 9,788 (363 per match)
- Scoring leader(s): (Sweden) Camilla Nilsson

Awards
- MVP: (Sweden) Karolina Widar

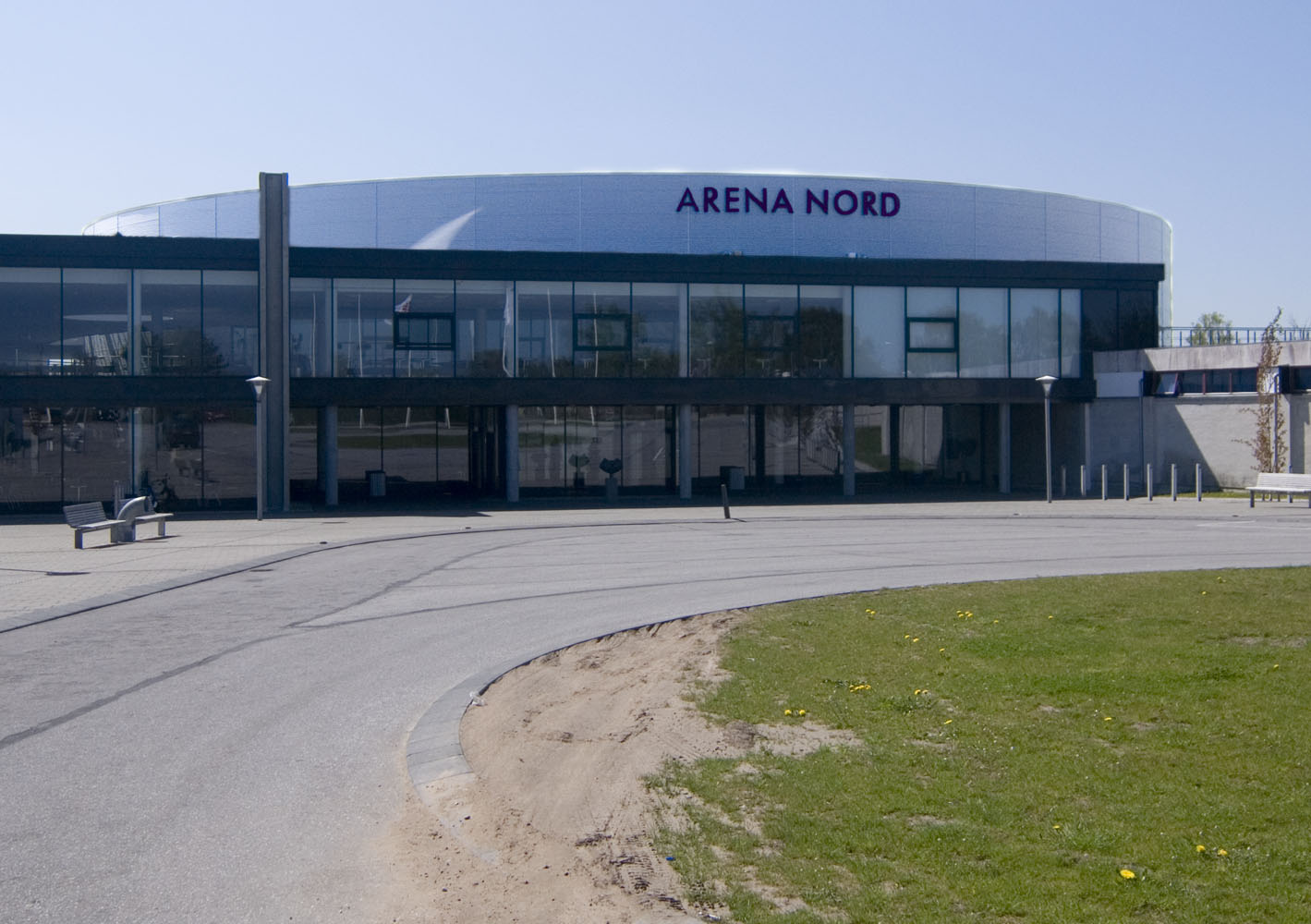
FRH Arena Nord was the official venue at the 2007 Women's World Floorball Championships.

The 2007 Women's World Floorball Championships were the sixth world championships in women's floorball. The tournament took place over May 12 to 19, 2007 in Frederikshavn, Denmark. Sweden won the tournament defeating Finland, 7-3, in the final-game.

All matches took place in the FRH Arena Nord.

== Championship results ==
=== Preliminary round ===
==== Group A ====
Team	Pld	W	D	L	GF	GA	GD	Pts
Switzerland	4	4	0	0	49	8	+41	8
Latvia	4	2	1	1	16	22	−6	5
Denmark	4	2	0	2	21	19	+2	4
Norway	4	1	1	2	21	24	−3	3
United States	4	0	0	4	12	46	−34	0

===== May 12, 2007 =====
May 12, 2007
11.00

United States	7–11	Norway

Frederikshavn, Denmark
FRH Arena Nord

May 12, 2007
17.10

Denmark	2–9	Switzerland

Frederikshavn, Denmark
FRH Arena Nord

===== May 13, 2007 =====
May 13, 2007
17.00

Norway	5–8	Denmark

Frederikshavn, Denmark
FRH Arena Nord

May 13, 2007
20.00

Latvia	8–3	United States

Frederikshavn, Denmark
FRH Arena Nord

===== May 14, 2007 =====
May 14, 2007
14.00

Switzerland	14–1	Latvia

Frederikshavn, Denmark
FRH Arena Nord

May 14, 2007
20.00

United States	0–8	Denmark

Frederikshavn, Denmark
FRH Arena Nord

===== May 15, 2007 =====
May 15, 2007
14.00

Switzerland	19–2	United States

Frederikshavn, Denmark
FRH Arena Nord

May 15, 2007
20.00

Latvia	2–2	Norway

Frederikshavn, Denmark
FRH Arena Nord

===== May 16, 2007 =====
May 16, 2007
14.00

Norway	3–7	Switzerland

Frederikshavn, Denmark
FRH Arena Nord

May 16, 2007
20.00

Denmark	3–5	Latvia

Frederikshavn, Denmark
FRH Arena Nord

==== Group B ====
Team	Pld	W	D	L	GF	GA	GD	Pts
Finland	4	4	0	0	36	4	+32	8
Sweden	4	3	0	1	46	6	+40	6
Czech Republic	4	2	0	2	31	15	+16	4
Russia	4	1	0	3	16	44	−28	2
Singapore	4	0	0	4	8	68	−60	0

===== May 12, 2007 =====
May 12, 2007
13.45

Russia	2–12	Finland

Frederikshavn, Denmark
FRH Arena Nord

May 12, 2007
20.00

Singapore	1–23	Sweden

Frederikshavn, Denmark
FRH Arena Nord

===== May 13, 2007 =====
May 13, 2007
11.00

Czech Republic	11–2	Russia

Frederikshavn, Denmark
FRH Arena Nord

May 13, 2007
14.00

Finland	17–0	Singapore

Frederikshavn, Denmark
FRH Arena Nord

===== May 14, 2007 =====
May 14, 2007
11.00

Russia	11–5	Singapore

Frederikshavn, Denmark
FRH Arena Nord

May 14, 2007
17.00

Sweden	6–2	Czech Republic

Frederikshavn, Denmark
FRH Arena Nord

===== May 15, 2007 =====
May 15, 2007
11.00

Sweden	16–1	Russia

Frederikshavn, Denmark
FRH Arena Nord

May 15, 2007
17.00

Czech Republic	1–5	Finland

Frederikshavn, Denmark
FRH Arena Nord

===== May 16, 2007 =====
May 16, 2007
11.00

Singapore	2–17	Czech Republic

Frederikshavn, Denmark
FRH Arena Nord

May 16, 2007
17.00

Finland	2–1	Sweden

Frederikshavn, Denmark
FRH Arena Nord

=== Playoffs ===
Semifinals
A1	Switzerland	1
B2	Sweden	3
B1	Finland	5
A2	Latvia	0

Finals
B2	Sweden	7
B1	Finland	3

==== Semi-finals ====
May 18, 2007
17.00

Switzerland	1–3	Sweden

Frederikshavn, Denmark
FRH Arena Nord

May 18, 2007
20.00

Finland	5–0	Latvia

Frederikshavn, Denmark
FRH Arena Nord

==== Bronze Medal match ====
May 19, 2007
14.00

Latvia	1–7	Switzerland

Frederikshavn, Denmark
FRH Arena Nord

==== World Championship match ====
May 19, 2007
17.00

Sweden	7–3	Finland

Frederikshavn, Denmark
FRH Arena Nord

=== Placement round ===
==== 9th Place match ====
May 17, 2007
17.00

United States	3–2	Singapore

Frederikshavn, Denmark
FRH Arena Nord

==== 7th Place match ====
May 17, 2007
20.00

Russia	3–2	Norway

Frederikshavn, Denmark
FRH Arena Nord

==== 5th Place match ====
May 19, 2007
11.00

Denmark	2–6	Czech Republic

Frederikshavn, Denmark
FRH Arena Nord

== Leading scorers ==
Player		GP	G	A	PTS	PIM
(Sweden)	Camilla Nilsson	6	9	5	14	4
(United States)	Annukka Muuri	5	7	7	14	2
(Switzerland)	Mirca Anderegg	6	4	10	14	0
(Sweden)	Maria Sahlin	6	6	6	12	0
(Sweden)	Karolina Widar	6	4	8	12	0
(Switzerland)	Marion Rittmeyer	6	6	5	11	0
(Switzerland)	Simone Berner	6	2	9	11	0
(Sweden)	Hermine Dahlerus	6	6	4	10	0
(Sweden)	Sara Kristoffersson	6	6	4	10	2
(Czech Republic)	Ilona Novotná	5	5	5	10	0

== All-Star team ==
- Goalkeeper: (Finland) Jonna Mäkelä
- Defense: (Switzerland) Simone Berner, (Finland) Jenni Morottaja
- Forward: (Sweden) Karolina Widar, (Sweden) Camilla Nilsson, (Switzerland) Mirca Anderegg

== Rankings ==
2007 Women's World Floorball Championship winners

Sweden
3rd World title

Official 2007 Rankings according to the IFF

Rk.	Team
1st place, gold medalist(s)	Sweden
2nd place, silver medalist(s)	Finland
3rd place, bronze medalist(s)	Switzerland
4.	Latvia
5.	Czech Republic
6.	Denmark
7.	Russia
8.	Norway
9.	United States
10.	Singapore
