= 2025 Women's World Floorball Championships =

15th edition of the Women's World Floorball Championships

Tournament details
- Host country: Czech Republic
- Venues: 2 (in 2 host cities)
- Dates: 6 December – 14 December
- Teams: 16

Final positions
- Champions: Switzerland (2nd title)
- Runners-up: Czech Republic
- Third place: Finland
- Fourth place: Sweden

Tournament statistics
- Matches played: 48

The 2025 Women's World Floorball Championships was the 15th edition of Women's World Floorball Championship. It was held from 6 to 14 December 2025 in Brno and Ostrava in the Czech Republic. The final was in Ostrava. It was the second time that the Czech Republic hosted the Women's World Championships. The first time was in 2013, in the same cities.

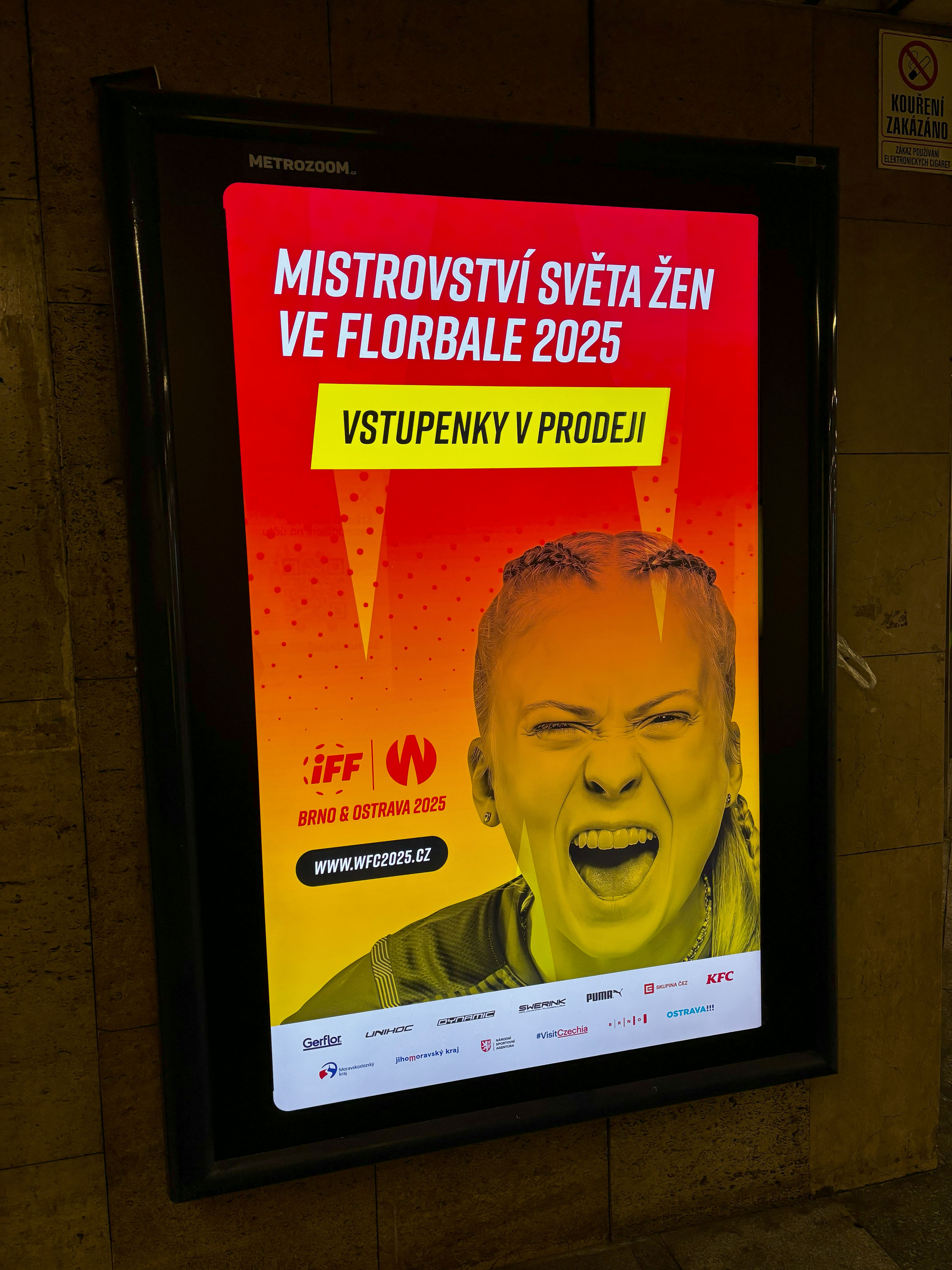
Advertising panel in Prague, promoting the championships

Switzerland emerged victorious after defeating the Czech Republic in the final. For the Swiss team, it was the second victory in their history, having previously won in 2005. The Czech team reached the gold-medal match for the first time after defeating Finland for the first time at a World Championship in the semifinals. It was the first World Championship final that featured neither Sweden nor Finland. The Swedish team failed to win the tournament for the first time since 2005. It also lost its streak of 54 consecutive unbeaten matches at World Championships. In addition, Sweden lost the bronze-medal match against Finland and finished a World Championship without a medal for the first time.

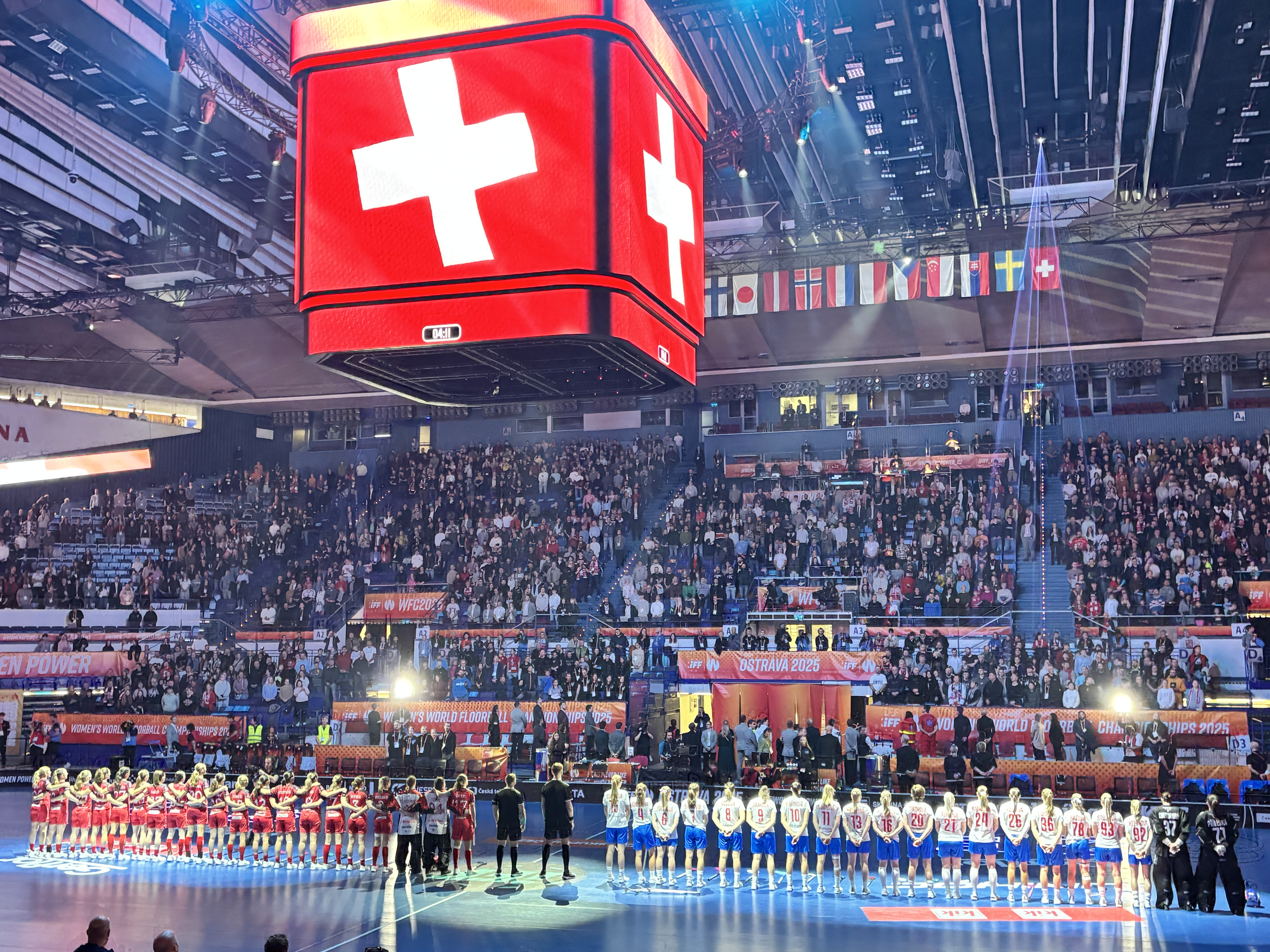
Czechia vs Switzerland final

The tournament set a record attendance of 67,736 spectators, surpassing the previous record from the 2019 championship. The final match also saw a record crowd of 8,844 spectators, exceeding the attendance of the 2015 tournament final.

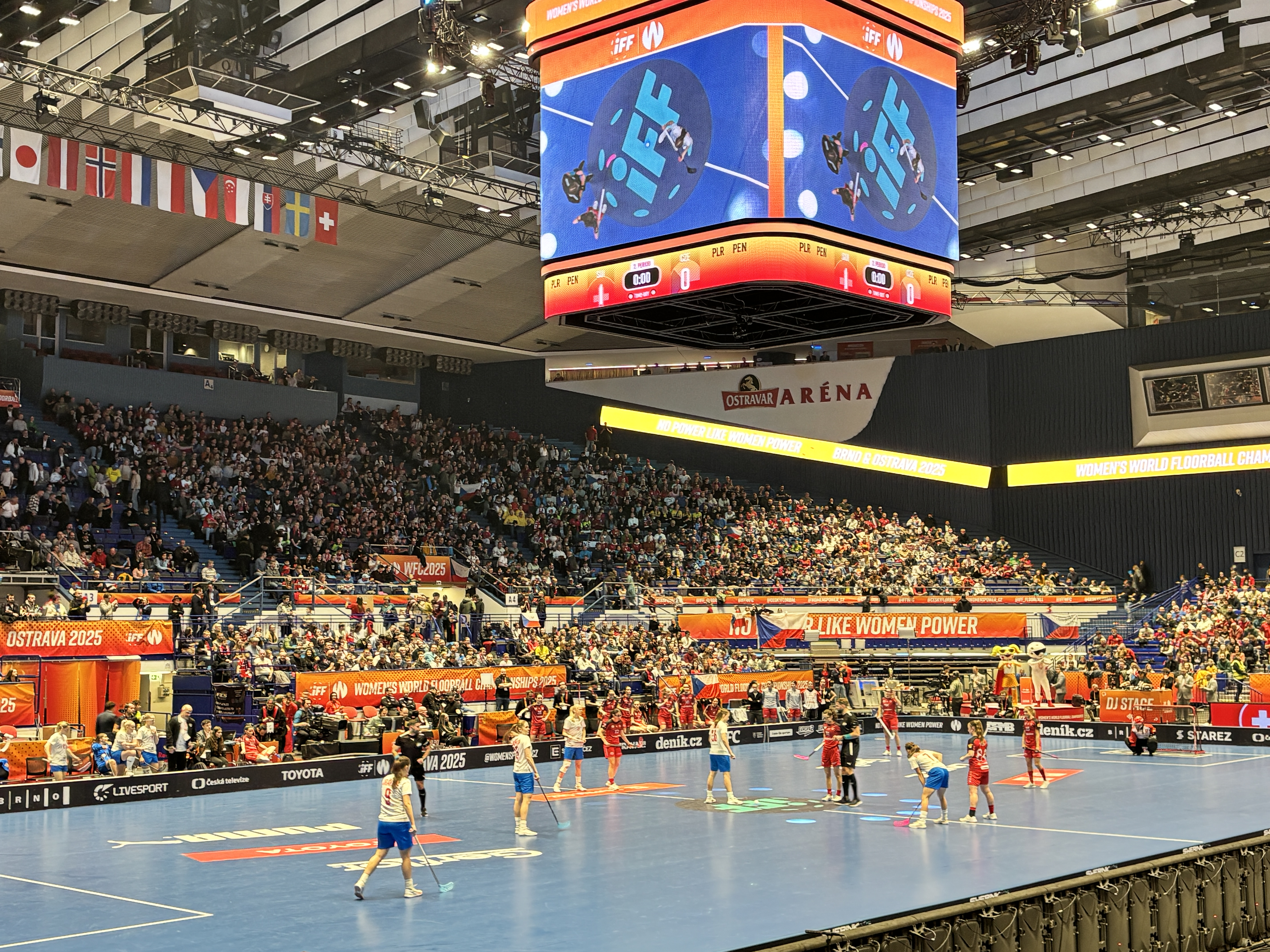
Spectators and the arena during the Czechia vs Switzerland final

== Host selection ==
- Czech Republic

In late 2019, the Czech Floorball Federation announced they were considering bidding for either the 2023 or 2025 edition. They ended up choosing to bid for 2025 after Singapore and Thailand stated they wanted to bid for 2023 as they wanted to give a country outside of Europe a chance to host (Singapore hosted the 2023 event).

The Czechs were given the hosting rights unopposed on 24 May 2023. The Moravian-Silesian Region has given its financial support to this tournament. It was the second time that the Czech Republic hosted the Women's World Floorball Championships. The first time was in 2013, in the same cities.

== Qualification ==
The final tournament featured 16 national teams. The Czech Republic has secured its participation in advance as the host country. The remaining spots were determined among the registered teams through regional qualifiers.

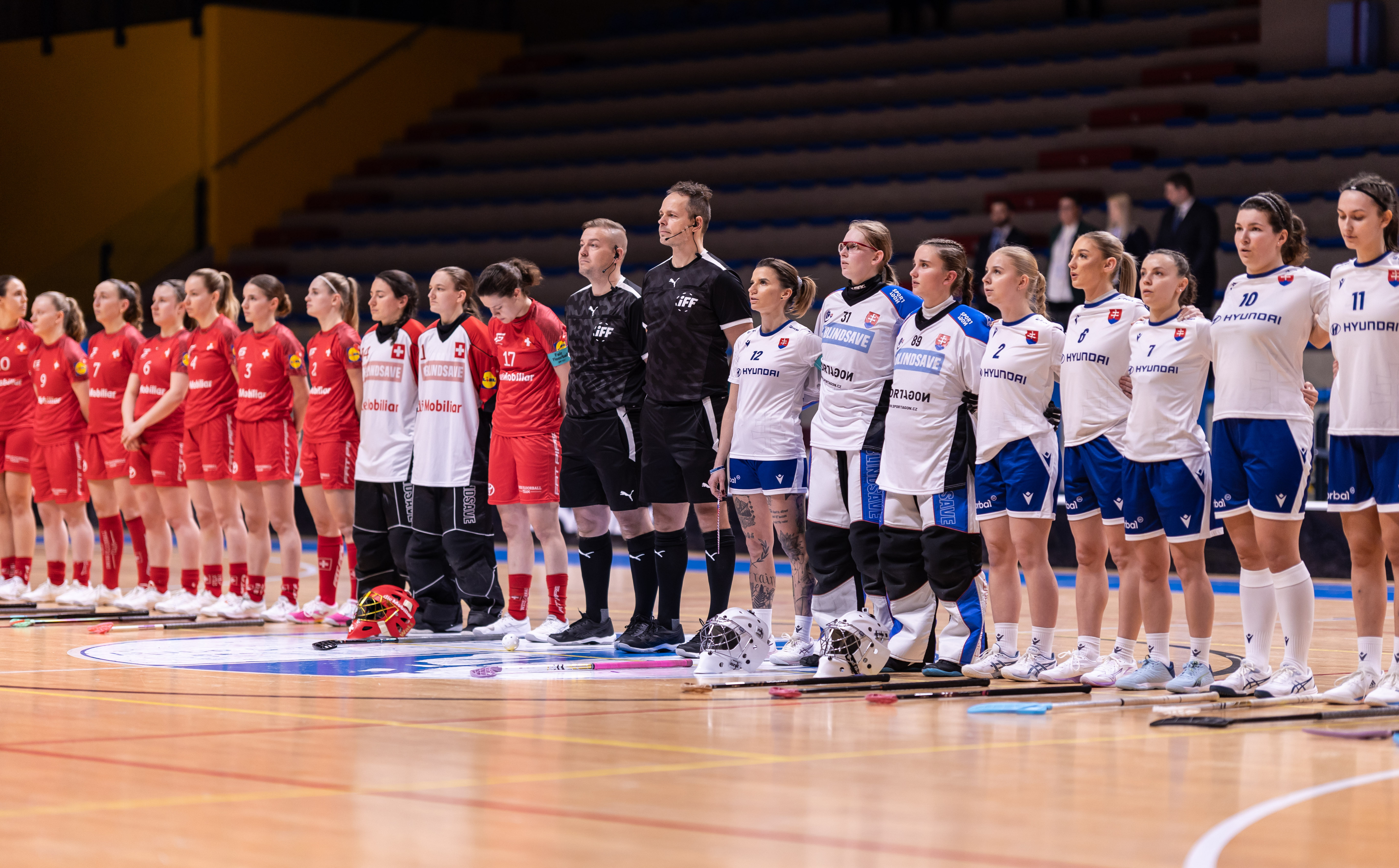
Teams of Switzerland and Slovakia before qualification match

Slot allocation:

- Host country: 1 spot
- Americas: 1 spots
- Asia and Oceania: 3 spots
- Europe: 11 spots

Two European qualifiers took place between 28 January and 1 February, 2025, in Valmiera, Latvia, and Lignano Sabbiadoro, Italy. The Latvian qualifier included ten teams divided into two groups, with the top three teams from each group advancing. In Italian qualification, held in conjunction with qualification tournament for the 2025 Men's U-19 World Championships, eight teams competed, divided also into two groups. The top two teams from each group qualified, along with the winner of the playoff match between the third-placed teams. For the first time since 2015, the Netherlands qualified for the championship after a 10-year absence, replacing France.

The American qualifier took place from 8 to 10 March in Austin, USA, and the home team qualified.

The Asia-Oceania qualifier was held from 18 to 22 March in Singapore. Eight national teams divided into two groups competed for three spots. The top two teams also qualified for the 2025 World Games. The qualifying teams were to be determined in the play-offs, which included the top two teams from each group. Thailand, which had advanced to the final, withdrew from the championship in advance due to a scheduling conflict with the SEA Games, which it is hosting. As a result, the remaining three play-off participants automatically qualified for the championship. The knockout stage of the tournament then only served to determine the qualifiers for the World Games.

=== Qualified teams ===
	Slots	Qualified	WR	2023	Appearance(s)			Previous best performance
	Slots	Qualified	WR	2023	Total	Streak	Last	Previous best performance
Host nation	1	Czech Republic	3rd	3rd	15	15	2023	3rd place (2011, 2023)
European Qualification A	3	Sweden	1st	1st	15	15	2023	Champions (eleven times) (Note: Sweden have won 1997, 2003, 2007, 2009, 2011, 2013, 2015, 2017, 2019, 2021, 2023)
European Qualification A	3	Norway	9th	11th	15	15	2023	3rd place (1997, 2001)
European Qualification A	3	Germany	10th	10th	12	8	2023	6th place (1999, 2015)
European Qualification B	3	Finland	2nd	2nd	15	15	2023	Champions (1999, 2001)
European Qualification B	3	Latvia	7th	7th	15	15	2023	4th place (2007)
European Qualification B	3	Estonia	13th	13th	5	5	2023	11th place (2017)
European Qualification C	2+1	Switzerland	4th	4th	15	15	2023	Champions (2005)
European Qualification C	2+1	Netherlands	21st	–	3	1	2015	13th place (2011)
European Qualification C	2+1	Denmark	8th	8th	10	10	2023	6th place (2007)
European Qualification D	2	Slovakia	5th	5th	8	8	2023	5th place (2017, 2023)
European Qualification D	2	Poland	6th	6th	9	9	2023	5th place (2019, 2021)
Americas Qualification	1	United States	14th	14th	9	6	2023	9th place (2007, 2011)
Asia-Oceania Qualification	3	Japan	11th	9th	9	2	2023	8th place (2005)
Asia-Oceania Qualification	3	Australia	15th	16th	7	2	2023	11th place (2019)
Asia-Oceania Qualification	3	Singapore	12th	12th	7	6	2023	10th place (2007)

Host Qualified Did not qualify

== Venues ==
The group stage matches took place in Brno at the STAREZ Aréna Vodova. For the play-offs, the tournament moved to Ostravar Aréna in Ostrava. The same venues hosted the championship in 2013. Both venues used two halls for the tournament.

Tournament venues information
Venue	Rounds	Games
Ostravar Aréna	Ranking brackets, Quarterfinals, Semifinals and Final	20
STAREZ Aréna Vodova	Preliminary round, Play-off round	28

=== Overview of venues ===
- The Ostravar Aréna in Ostrava was the main venue for the tournament. The venue has played host to the Ice Hockey World Championships three times: in 2005, 2015 and 2024. Other notable events at the venue include the 1986 FIVB Women's Volleyball World Championship, 2005 UEFA Futsal Championship, 2008 Men's World Floorball Championships, 2010 FIBA World Championship for Women the Czech floorball Superfinals in 2018 and 2019.
- The STAREZ Aréna Vodova was used as the secondary arena for the event. The venue previously hosted the 1998 Men's World Floorball Championships, 2010 FIBA World Championship for Women, 2021 Men's U-19 World Floorball Championships and EuroBasket Women 2025. The venue has also hosted numerous basketball, floorball, handball and volleyball youth championships.

Ostrava	Brno	2025 Women's World Floorball Championships is located in Czech Republic
Ostravar Aréna; Capacity: 10,000	STAREZ Aréna Vodova; Capacity: 2,900	2025 Women's World Floorball Championships is located in Czech Republic

== Draw ==
The draw took place at 14:55 CET on 20 March 2025 at the Lower Vítkovice Hall in Ostrava. The guests were Local Organising Committee General Secretary, Petr Chvojka, former Czech captain, Eliška Krupnová, Deputy Governor of the Moravian-Silesian Region, Jiří Veřmiřovský, President of the sports department in Brno, Martin Jelínek, Mayor of Ostrava, Jan Dohnal and IFF Secretary General John Liljelund, whom all assisted with the draw. The draw started with, in order, teams from pots 4 and 3 being placed into groups C and D, while the teams from pots 2 and 1 later being drawn into groups A and B.

The pots were based on the IFF rankings.

Pot 1
Team	Rank
Sweden	1
Finland	2
Czech Republic (H)	3
Switzerland	4

Pot 2
Team	Rank
Slovakia	5
Poland	6
Latvia	7
Denmark	8

Pot 3
Team	Rank
Norway	9
Germany	10
Japan	11
Singapore	12

Pot 4
Team	Rank
Estonia	13
United States	14
Australia	15
Netherlands	21

== Referees ==
Eight referee pairs were selected on 15 September 2025.

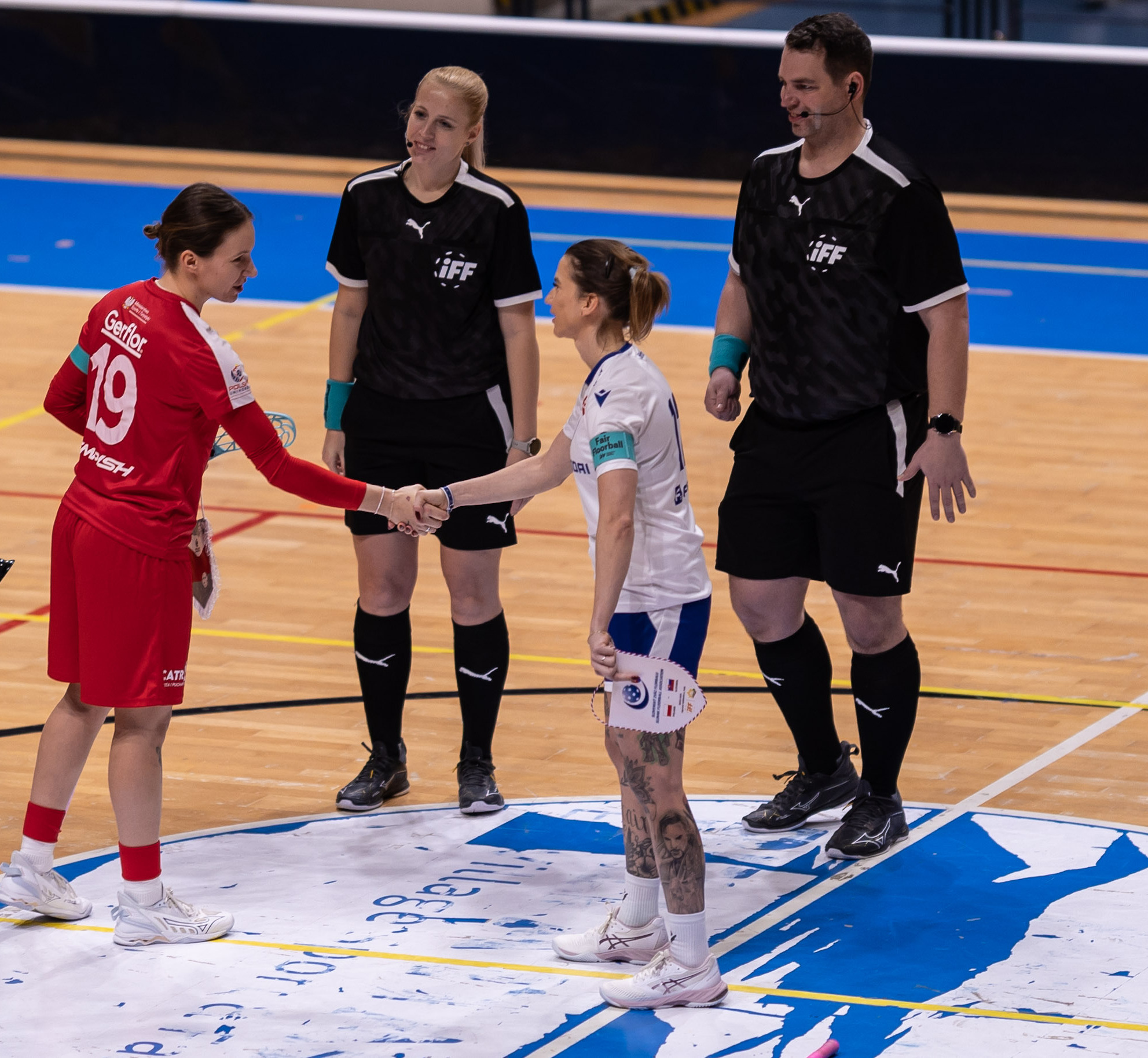
Czech referee pair Nikola Husáková and Václav Patera at a qualification match

Referees
Czech Republic	Nikola Husáková and Václav Patera
Czech Republic	Barbora Beranová and Lucie Hejnová
Finland	Henrik Snellman and Mona Vänskä
Finland	Toni Nerg and Anssi Saarinen
Singapore	Carmen Teo and Binbin Lin
Sweden	Daniel Hultberg and Edo Sabanovic
Sweden	Jörgen Andersson and Kevin Cardell
Switzerland	Christian Friemel and Erik Hasselberg

== Tournament format ==
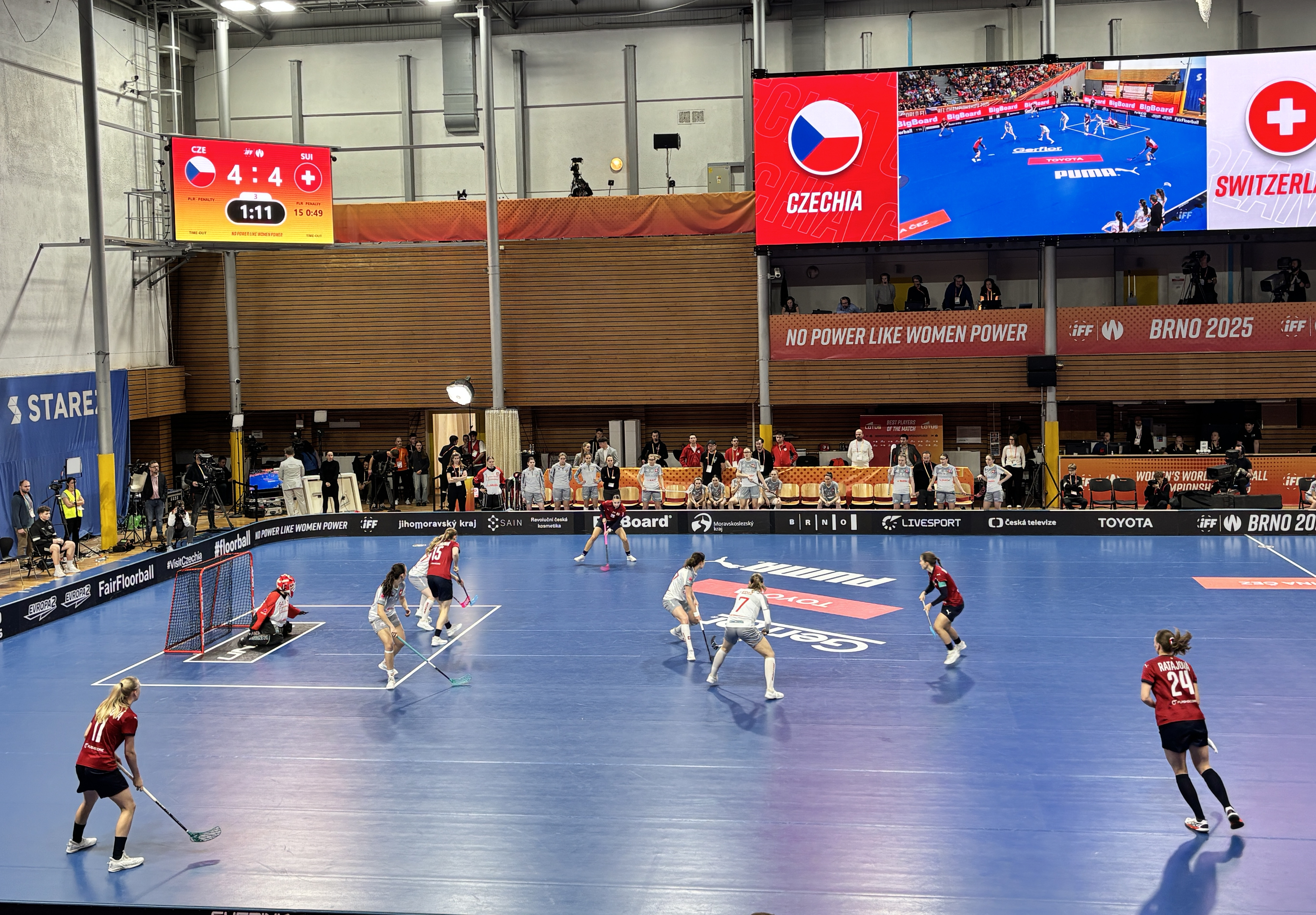
Czechia vs Switzerland preliminary round match

In the group stage each team plays each other once, while the second stage of the event includes play-offs and placement matches.

The two best teams of group A and B go directly to the quarter-finals. Teams placed third and fourth in group A and B and the teams placed first and second in group C and D go into the first play-off round (played before the quarter-finals).

Because the tournament is held in two cities, the schedule is slightly different from usual. The group stage is played over three days instead of the usual four. The play-off qualification round will already take place on the fourth day. On the fifth day, the teams advancing to the quarterfinals will have a rest day to transfer from Brno to Ostrava.

== Preliminary round ==
The schedule was announced on 24 June 2025. Times are CET (UTC+1)

=== Tiebreakers ===
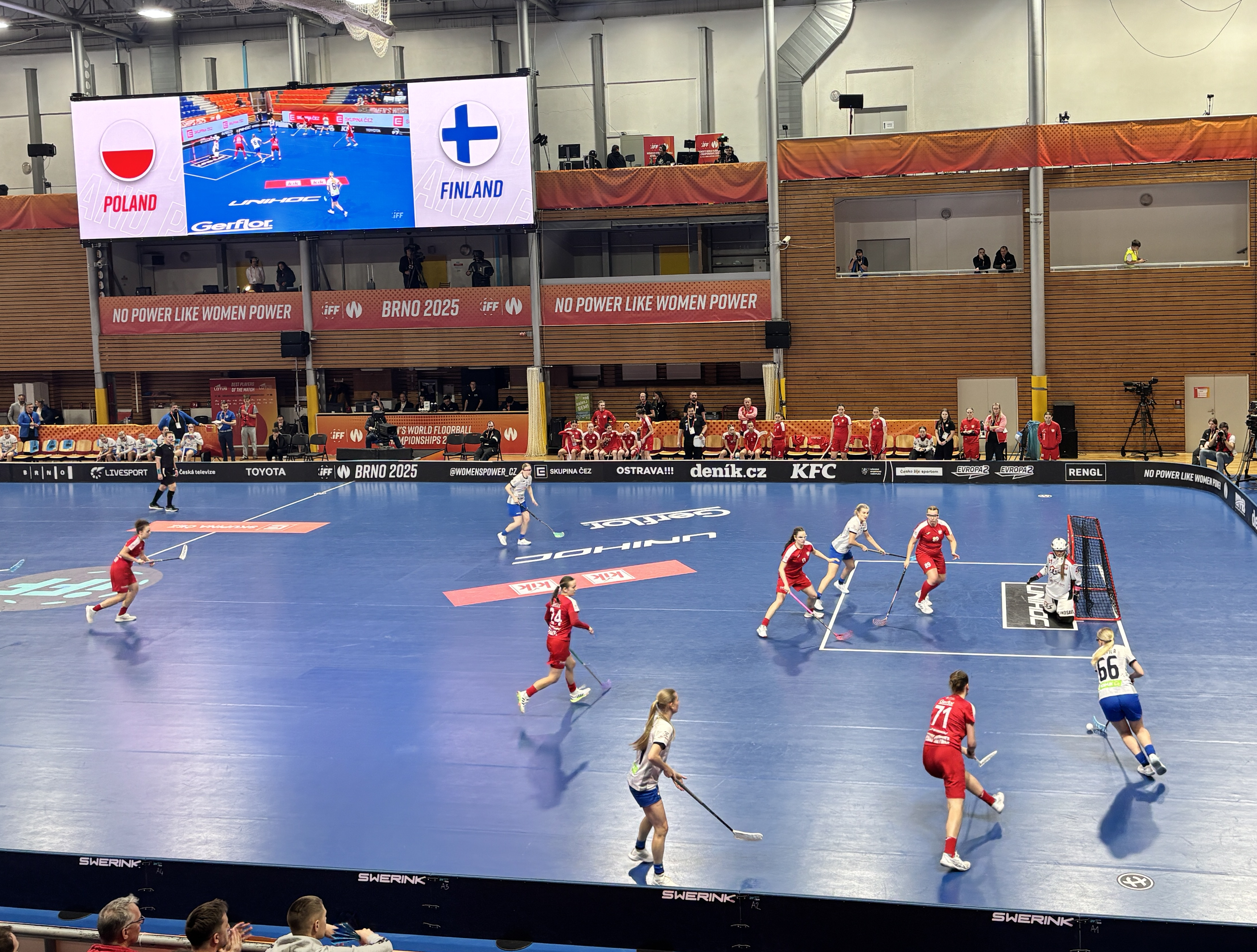
Poland vs Finland match

Teams are ranked according to points (3 points for a win, 1 point for a draw, 0 points for a loss), and if tied on points, the following tiebreaking criteria are applied, in the order given, to determine the rankings:

1. Points in head-to-head matches among tied teams;
2. Goal difference in head-to-head matches among tied teams;
3. Goals scored in head-to-head matches among tied teams;
4. Goal difference in all group matches;
5. Goals scored in all group matches.

If the ranking of one of these teams is determined, the above criteria are consecutively followed until the ranking of all teams is determined. If no ranking can be determined, a drawing of lots will decide the outcome.

=== Group A ===
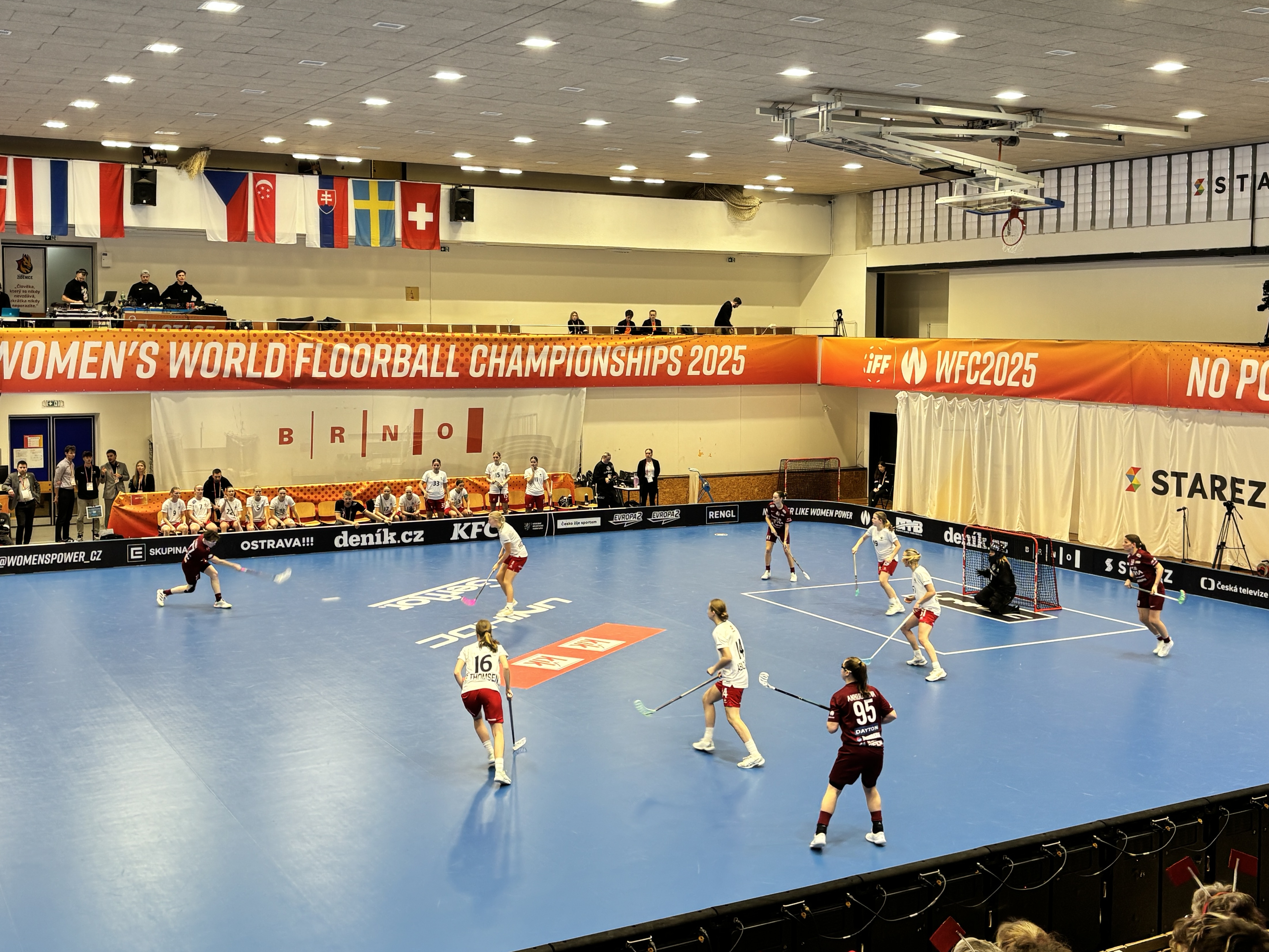
Latvia vs Denmark match

Pos	Team	Pld	W	D	L	GF	GA	GD	Pts	Qualification
1	Czech Republic	3	3	0	0	24	6	+18	6	Quarterfinals
2	Switzerland	3	2	0	1	23	13	+10	4	Quarterfinals
3	Denmark	3	1	0	2	8	26	−18	2	Play-off round
4	Latvia	3	0	0	3	10	20	−10	0	Play-off round

Source: IFF

6 December 2025; 10:00	Switzerland	8–4 (2–1, 5–2, 1–1)	Latvia	STAREZ Aréna Vodova A Attendance: 423

Game reference

6 December 2025; 17:30	Czech Republic	11–0 (2–0, 5–0, 4–0)	Denmark	STAREZ Aréna Vodova A Attendance: 2,811

Game reference

7 December 2025; 10:30	Denmark	2–11 (1–4, 0–4, 1–3)	Switzerland	STAREZ Aréna Vodova B Attendance: 219

Game reference

7 December 2025; 16:45	Latvia	2–6 (1–4, 0–2, 1–0)	Czech Republic	STAREZ Aréna Vodova A Attendance: 2,289

Game reference

8 December 2025; 10:00	Latvia	4–6 (1–1, 2–3, 1–2)	Denmark	STAREZ Aréna Vodova B Attendance: 701

Game reference

8 December 2025; 17:00	Czech Republic	7–4 (2–1, 2–3, 3–0)	Switzerland	STAREZ Aréna Vodova A Attendance: 2,850

Game reference

=== Group B ===
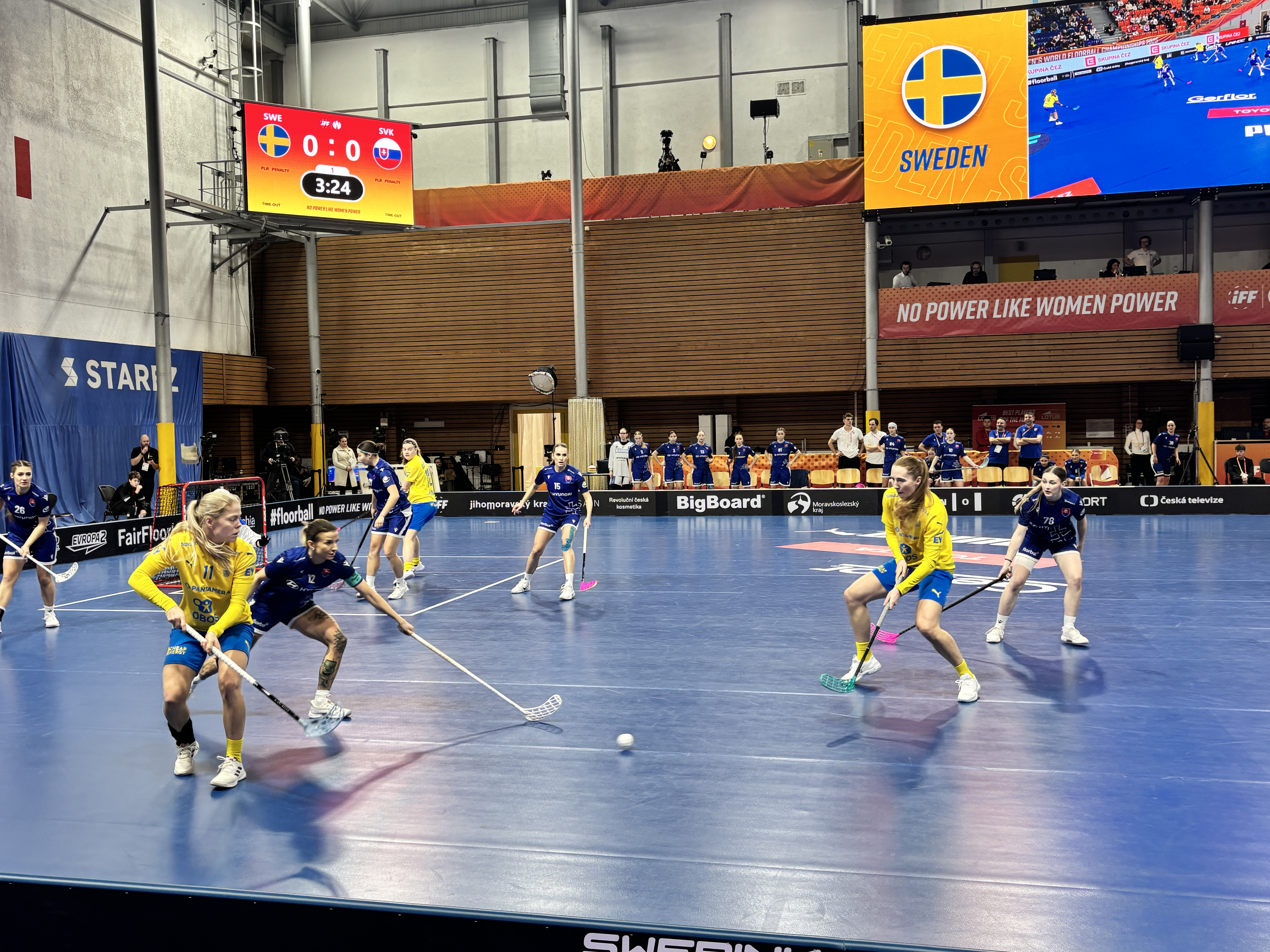
Sweden vs Slovakia match

Pos	Team	Pld	W	D	L	GF	GA	GD	Pts	Qualification
1	Sweden	3	2	1	0	39	4	+35	5	Quarterfinals
2	Finland	3	2	1	0	34	8	+26	5	Quarterfinals
3	Slovakia	3	1	0	2	12	31	−19	2	Play-off round
4	Poland	3	0	0	3	4	46	−42	0	Play-off round

Source: IFF

6 December 2025; 13:00	Sweden	3–3 (1–0, 2–3, 0–0)	Finland	STAREZ Aréna Vodova A Attendance: 715

Game reference

6 December 2025; 20:30	Slovakia	7–3 (2–0, 2–0, 3–3)	Poland	STAREZ Aréna Vodova A Attendance: 1,102

Game reference

7 December 2025; 13:00	Finland	13–4 (5–0, 4–1, 4–3)	Slovakia	STAREZ Aréna Vodova A Attendance: 646

Game reference

7 December 2025; 20:00	Poland	0–21 (0–8, 0–6, 0–7)	Sweden	STAREZ Aréna Vodova A Attendance: 741

Game reference

8 December 2025; 13:45	Poland	1–18 (1–5, 0–6, 0–7)	Finland	STAREZ Aréna Vodova A Attendance: 301

Game reference

8 December 2025; 20:00	Sweden	15–1 (2–0, 2–0, 11–1)	Slovakia	STAREZ Aréna Vodova A Attendance: 1,212

Game reference

=== Group C ===
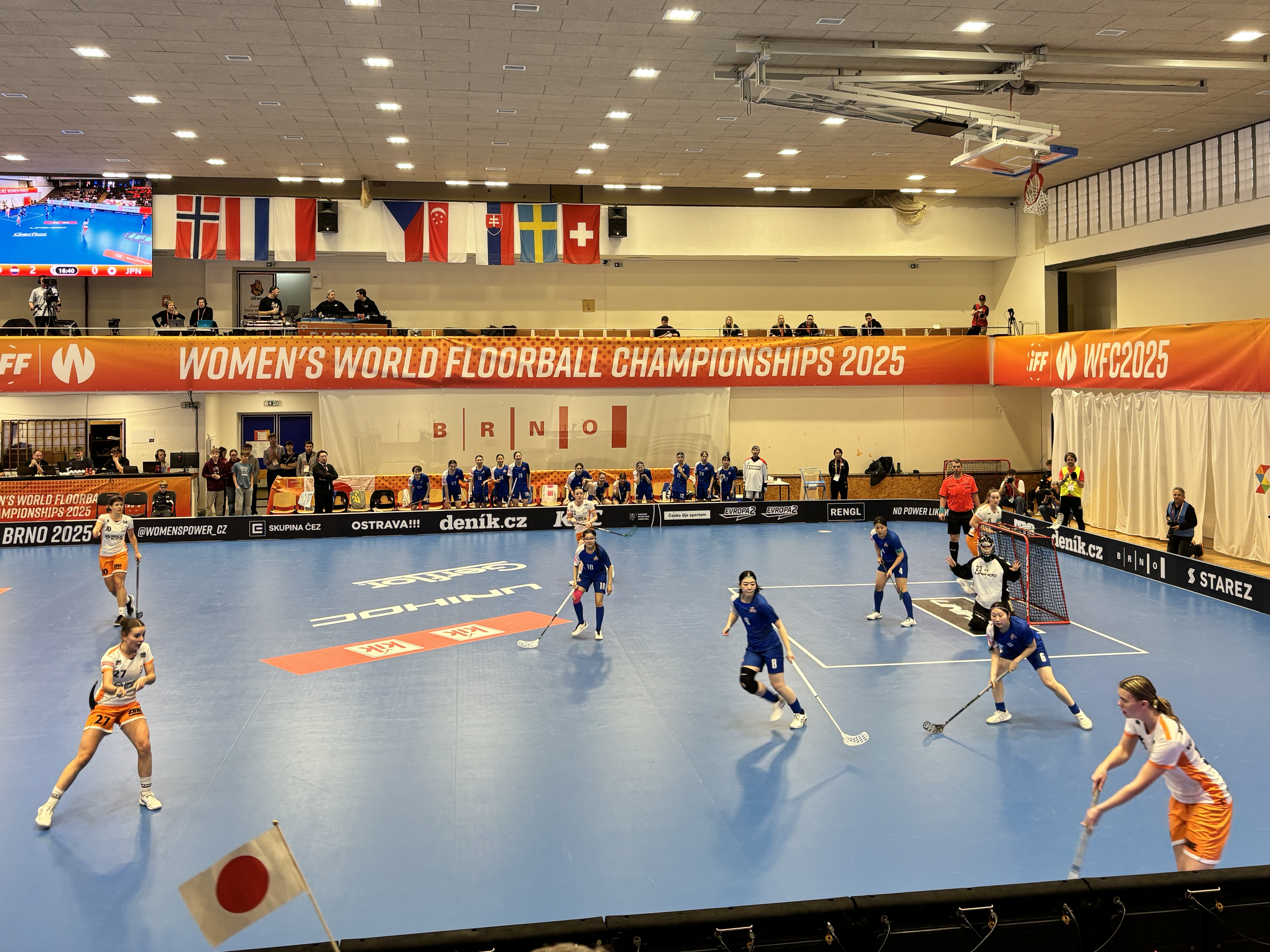
Netherlands vs Japan match

Pos	Team	Pld	W	D	L	GF	GA	GD	Pts	Qualification
1	Norway	3	3	0	0	27	6	+21	6	Play-off round
2	Netherlands	3	2	0	1	18	16	+2	4	Play-off round
3	Japan	3	0	1	2	9	18	−9	1	13–16th-place play-off
4	Australia	3	0	1	2	5	19	−14	1	13–16th-place play-off

Source: IFF

6 December 2025; 11:00	Australia	3–7 (0–3, 0–2, 3–2)	Netherlands	STAREZ Aréna Vodova B Attendance: 279

Game reference

6 December 2025; 20:00	Japan	2–9 (1–1, 0–3, 1–5)	Norway	STAREZ Aréna Vodova B Attendance: 112

Game reference

7 December 2025; 13:30	Australia	2–2 (2–1, 0–1, 0–0)	Japan	STAREZ Aréna Vodova B Attendance: 233

Game reference

7 December 2025; 19:30	Netherlands	4–8 (0–1, 1–2, 3–5)	Norway	STAREZ Aréna Vodova B Attendance: 187

Game reference

8 December 2025; 13:00	Netherlands	7–5 (2–0, 4–2, 1–3)	Japan	STAREZ Aréna Vodova B Attendance: 520

Game reference

8 December 2025; 19:00	Norway	10–0 (6–0, 3–0, 1–0)	Australia	STAREZ Aréna Vodova B Attendance: 299

Game reference

=== Group D ===
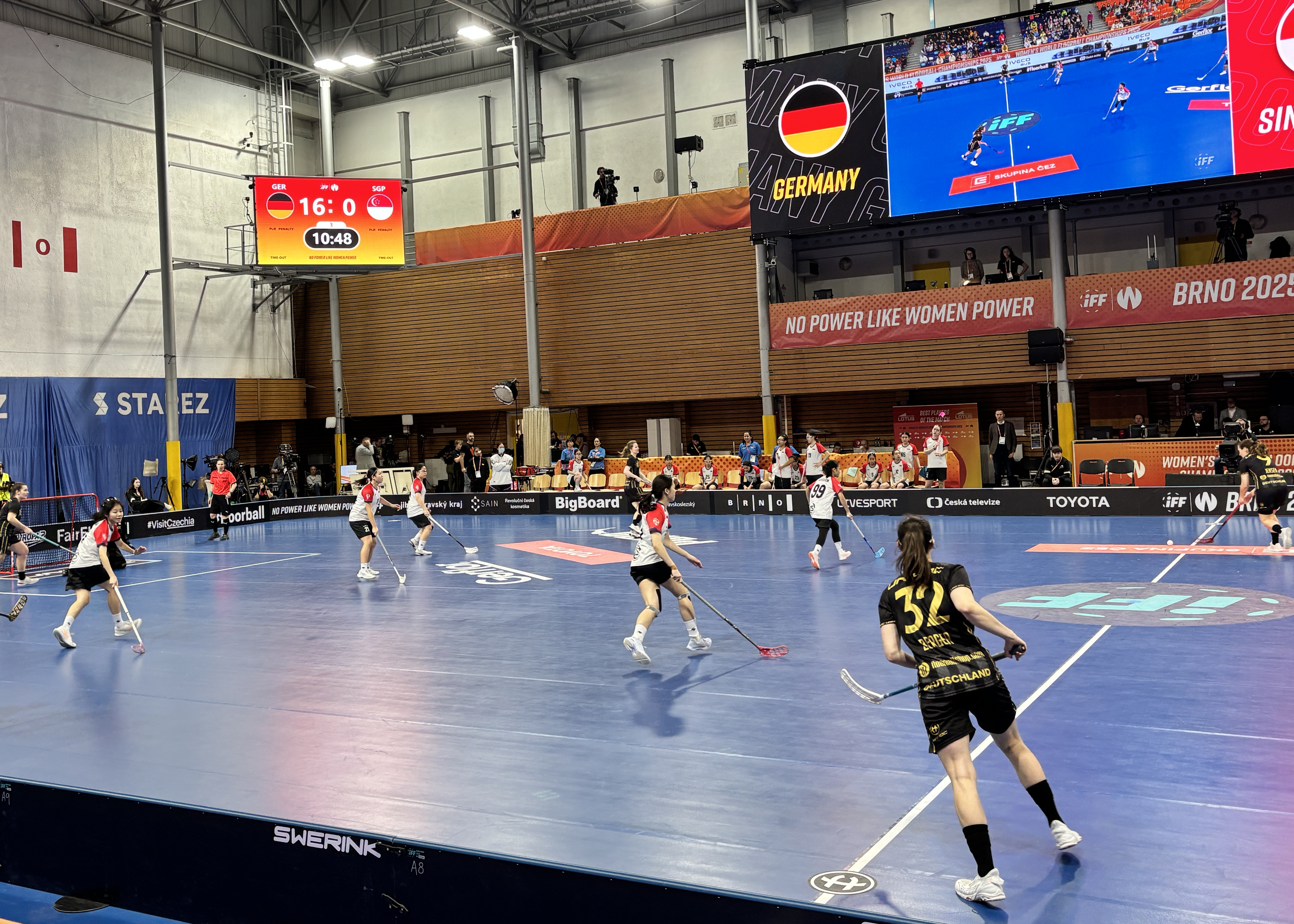
Germany vs Singapore match

Pos	Team	Pld	W	D	L	GF	GA	GD	Pts	Qualification
1	Germany	3	3	0	0	41	6	+35	6	Play-off round
2	Estonia	3	2	0	1	23	11	+12	4	Play-off round
3	United States	3	1	0	2	10	24	−14	2	13–16th-place play-off
4	Singapore	3	0	0	3	3	36	−33	0	13–16th-place play-off

Source: IFF

6 December 2025; 14:00	Singapore	1–8 (1–4, 0–1, 0–3)	United States	STAREZ Aréna Vodova B Attendance: 123

Game reference

6 December 2025; 17:00	Estonia	4–9 (0–4, 3–3, 1–2)	Germany	STAREZ Aréna Vodova B Attendance: 145

Game reference

7 December 2025; 10:00	United States	2–13 (2–4, 0–4, 0–5)	Germany	STAREZ Aréna Vodova A Attendance: 353

Game reference

7 December 2025; 16:30	Estonia	9–2 (3–2, 2–0, 4–0)	Singapore	STAREZ Aréna Vodova B Attendance: 119

Game reference

8 December 2025; 10:45	Germany	19–0 (7–0, 6–0, 6–0)	Singapore	STAREZ Aréna Vodova A Attendance: 1,711

Game reference

8 December 2025; 16:00	United States	0–10 (0–1, 0–4, 0–5)	Estonia	STAREZ Aréna Vodova B Attendance: 105

Game reference

== Knockout stage ==
=== Bracket ===
Play-off round
9 December
A4 Latvia	4
D1 Germany	3
9 December
B3 Slovakia	11
C2 Netherlands	4
9 December
B4 Poland	1
C1 Norway	2
9 December
A3 Denmark	4
D2 Estonia	1

Quarterfinals
12 December
B1 Sweden	16
PO3 Latvia	3
11 December
A2 Switzerland	14
PO2 Slovakia	1
11 December
A1 Czech Republic	9
PO4 Norway	2
12 December
B2 Finland	14
PO1 Denmark	2

Semifinals
13 December
Sweden	3
Switzerland	6
13 December
Czech Republic	1
Finland	0

Final
14 December
Switzerland	2
Czech Republic	0
Third place game
14 December
Sweden	4
Finland	6

=== Play-off round ===
9 December 2025; 11:00	Slovakia	11 – 4 (4–1, 4–0, 3–3)	Netherlands	STAREZ Aréna Vodova B Attendance: 1,100

Game reference

9 December 2025; 13:00	Poland	1–2 SO (1–0, 0–0, 0–1, 0–0); SO: 2–3	Norway	STAREZ Aréna Vodova A Attendance: 1,699

Game reference

9 December 2025; 16:00	Latvia	4–3 (1–1, 1–1, 2–1)	Germany	STAREZ Aréna Vodova A Attendance: 190

Game reference

9 December 2025; 19:00	Denmark	4–1 (1–0, 1–0, 2–1)	Estonia	STAREZ Aréna Vodova A Attendance: 179

Game reference

=== Quarterfinals ===
11 December 2025; 16:30	Czech Republic	9–2 (2–1, 5–0, 2–1)	Norway	Ostravar Aréna A Attendance: 5,129

Game reference

11 December 2025; 19:30	Switzerland	14–1 (4–0, 4–0, 6–1)	Slovakia	Ostravar Aréna A Attendance: 1,927

Game reference

12 December 2025; 19:00	Finland	14–2 (6–1, 5–0, 3–1)	Denmark	Ostravar Aréna A Attendance: 967

Game reference

12 December 2025; 16:00	Sweden	16–3 (7–1, 5–2, 4–0)	Latvia	Ostravar Aréna A Attendance: 641

Game reference

=== Semifinals ===
13 December 2025; 16:00	Czech Republic	1–0 (0–0, 0–0, 1–0)	Finland	Ostravar Aréna A Attendance: 5,934

Game reference

13 December 2025; 19:00	Sweden	3–6 (1–4, 0–1, 2–1)	Switzerland	Ostravar Aréna A Attendance: 3,889

Game reference

=== Bronze-medal game ===
14 December 2025; 12:45	Sweden	4–6 (1–3, 2–1, 1–2)	Finland	Ostravar Aréna A Attendance: 5,599

Game reference

=== Final ===
14 December 2025; 16:00	Switzerland	2–0 (1–0, 0–0, 1–0)	Czech Republic	Ostravar Aréna A Attendance: 8,844

Game reference

== Placement round ==
=== 13–16th-place play-off ===
==== 13–16th-place bracket ====
13–16th-place semifinals
10 December
D3 United States	7
C4 Australia	8
10 December
C3 Japan	5
D4 Singapore	3

13th-place game
12 December
Australia	2
Japan	3
15th-place game
12 December
United States	4
Singapore	3

==== 13–16th-place semifinals ====
10 December 2025; 16:00	United States	7–8 (2–4, 3–3, 2–1)	Australia	Ostravar Aréna A Attendance: 112

Game reference

10 December 2025; 19:00	Japan	5–3 (4–0, 1–0, 0–3)	Singapore	Ostravar Aréna A Attendance: 100

Game reference

==== 15th-place game ====
12 December 2025; 10:30	United States	4–3 OT (1–2, 1–0, 1–1, 1–0)	Singapore	Ostravar Aréna B Attendance: 330

Game reference

==== 13th-place game ====
12 December 2025; 13:30	Australia	2–3 OT (0–0, 0–1, 2–1, 0–1)	Japan	Ostravar Aréna B Attendance: 299

Game reference

=== 9–12th-place play-off ===
==== 9–12th-place bracket ====
9–12th-place semifinals
11 December
Netherlands	3
Germany	5
11 December
Estonia	2
Poland	5

9th-place game
12 December
Germany	1
Poland	5
11th-place game
12 December
Netherlands	6
Estonia	4

==== 9–12th-place semifinals ====
11 December 2025; 10:00	Netherlands	3–5 (0–2, 2–0, 1–3)	Germany	Ostravar Aréna A Attendance: 5,317

Game reference

11 December 2025; 13:00	Estonia	2–5 (0–1, 2–2, 0–2)	Poland	Ostravar Aréna A Attendance: 1,258

Game reference

==== 11th-place game ====
12 december 2025; 16:30	Netherlands	6–4 (3–1, 2–1, 1–2)	Estonia	Ostravar Aréna B Attendance: 107

Game reference

==== 9th-place game ====
12 December 2025; 10:00	Germany	1–5 (1–0, 0–1, 0–4)	Poland	Ostravar Aréna A Attendance: 3,637

Game reference

=== 5–8th-place play-off ===
==== 5–8th-place bracket ====
5−8th-place semifinals
13 December
Norway	4
Denmark	3
13 December
Latvia	4
Slovakia	3

5th-place game
14 December
Norway	3
Latvia	5
7th-place game
14 December
Denmark	6
Slovakia	7

==== 5–8th-place semifinals ====
13 December 2025; 13:00	Norway	4–3 (1–3, 2–0, 1–0)	Denmark	Ostravar Aréna A Attendance: 721

Game reference

13 December 2025; 13:30	Latvia	4–3 OT (2–0, 1–1, 0–2, 1–0)	Slovakia	Ostravar Aréna B Attendance: 390

Game reference

==== 7th-place game ====
14 December 2025; 10:30	Denmark	6–7 (1–1, 1–1, 4–3)	Slovakia	Ostravar Aréna B Attendance: 321

Game reference

==== 5th-place game ====
14 December 2025; 9:30	Norway	3–5 (3–2, 0–0, 0–3)	Latvia	Ostravar Aréna A Attendance: 850

Game reference

== Final ranking ==
1st place, gold medalist(s)	Switzerland
2nd place, silver medalist(s)	Czech Republic
3rd place, bronze medalist(s)	Finland
4	Sweden
5	Latvia
6	Norway
7	Slovakia
8	Denmark
9	Poland
10	Germany
11	Netherlands
12	Estonia
13	Japan
14	Australia
15	United States
16	Singapore

== Awards ==
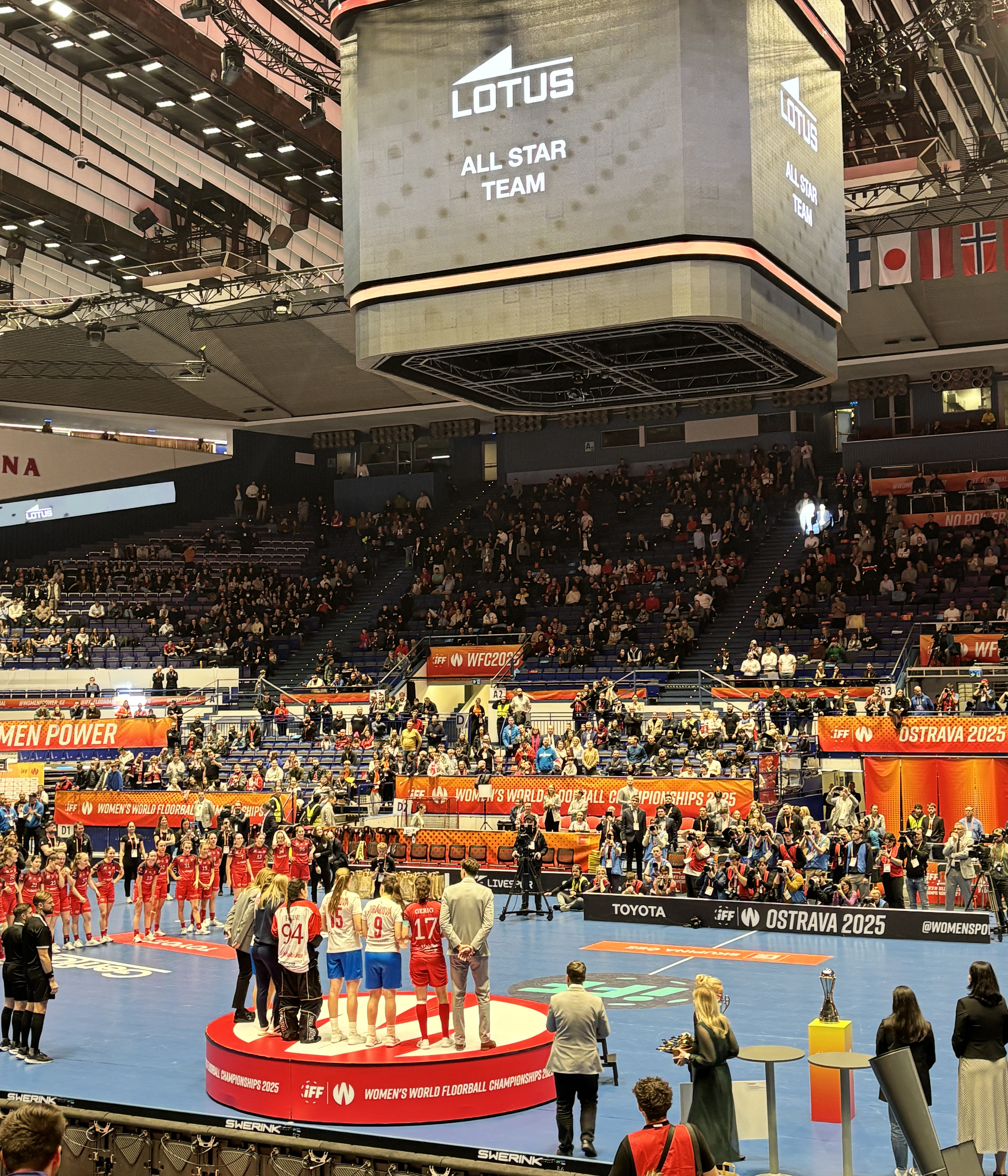
All Star team ceremony

For the first time, the Most Valuable Player award was won by a member of the Czech team. For the first time, the All-Star Team included three Czech players and no Swedish players.

=== Golden shoe ===
- (Czech Republic) Šárka Staňková

=== Team of the tournament ===
- Goalkeeper: (Switzerland) Lara Heini
- Defenders: (Czech Republic) Šárka Staňková, (Czech Republic) Nela Jiráková
- Center: (Finland) Veera Kauppi
- Forwards: (Czech Republic) Michaela Kubečková, (Switzerland) Isabelle Gerig

== Preparations ==
- Chairman of the Czech National Sports Agency, Ondřej Šebek, went to Singapore during the 2023 Women's World Floorball Championships to speak at a meeting with the International Floorball Federation.
- On 12 December 2023, the Moravian-Silesian Region and city of Ostrava announced their support for the tournament, with 3 million Czech koruna.
- On 28 November 2024, KFC was announced as a sponsor for the tournament.
- On 24 January 2025, president of the Czech Floorball Federation, Daniel Novák said their aim is to fill out stands plus reaching out and positively addressing the widest possible public, even outside of floorball or sports in general.
- On 17 April 2025, in connection with the tournament, the Czech Floorball Federation announced the project FLOORBALL POWER, aiming to help individuals and floorball clubs across the country to be active.
- On 22 October 2025, the mascots duo was shown for the first time, with one named Florian and the other one's name being decided by a vote.
- On 10 November 2025, the name, Floora, was announced as the name of the mascot. Floora was chosen after receiving the highest number of votes among four potential options.

=== Tickets ===
- On 4 December 2024, a pre-sale priority phase for people with a Czech floorball ID account was opened.
- On 11 December 2024, the first set of tickets were put out.
- On 26 June 2025, a second batch of tickets were put on sale.
- The third wave of tickets were released on 9 September 2025, with single-game tickets now available.

==== Official tickets website ====
- Official tickets website

=== Marketing ===
On 4 April 2024, the logo was publicly disclosed, showcasing a W that stands for women. The logo is about how women have limitless power and was developed for many in cooperation with Czech national team players and players from the Czech league. A website was also created at the same time.
