= Japan women's national floorball team =

- IFF Ranking: 11th (2025)

Japan women's national floorball team is the national team of Japan in women's floorball.

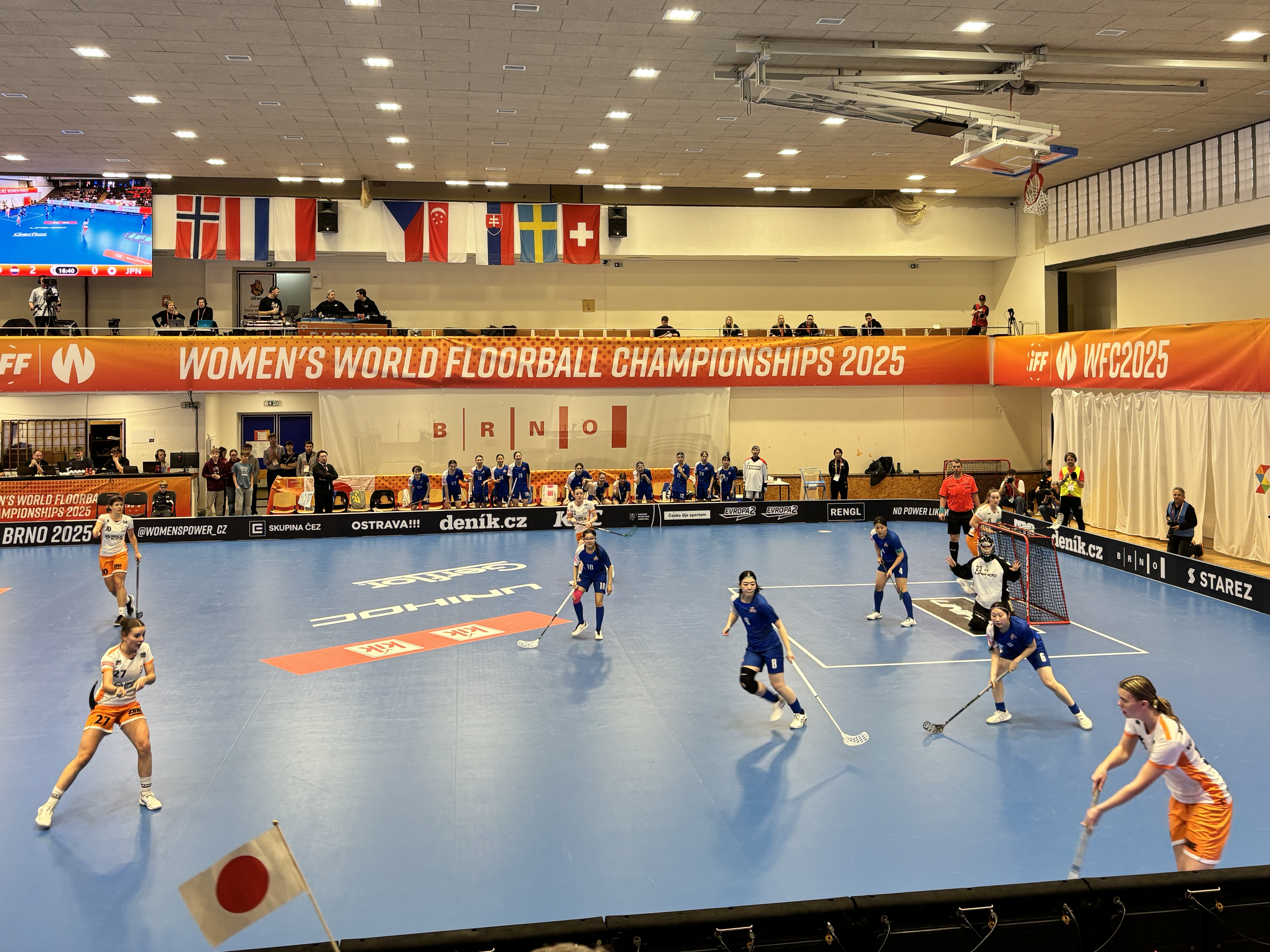
Japan national team (in blue) at 2017 World Championships

The team participated in the only (open) 1995 European Championships and later in the first World Championships. In both cases, it was the only non-European team and finished last. In the following tournaments, the team moved between Division A and Division B.

At the 2005 World Championships, Japan achieved its best result, the eighth place (last in Division A). As of 2025, this remains the best result of any non-European team. Since the introduction of qualification in 2011, Japan has regularly participated in the championships. In the new system, its best result was ninth place at the 2023 World Championships.

In the IFF rankings, the team is placed 11th, following 9th and 13th place finishes at last two World Championships in 2023 and 2025.

== World Championships ==
Year	Hosting Country	Rank	Final match
1997	Finland	10th place	Austria 2–4
1999 B	Sweden	11th place	Round-robin tournament
2001 B	Latvia	13th place	Australia 3–0
2003 B	Switzerland	9th place	Poland 7–6 OT
2005	Singapore	8th place	Czech Republic 0–4
2007 B	Denmark	16th place	Australia 1–8
2009 B	Sweden	17th place	Slovakia 6–3
2011	Switzerland	16th place	Australia 2–5
2013	Czech Republic	15th place	South Korea 5–1
2015	Finland	15th place	Singapore 5–4 OT
2017	Slovakia	14th place	Thailand 2–4
2019	Switzerland	13th place	Estonia 4–3
2021	Sweden	—	Did not participate
2023	Singapore	9th place	Germany 4–1
2025	Czech Republic	13th place	Australia 3–2 OT

== European Championships ==
Year	Hosting Country	Rank	Final match
1995	Switzerland	10th place	Hungary 0–6

== AOFC Cup ==
Year	Hosting Country	Rank	Final match
2018	Singapore	3rd place	Malaysia 4–3 OT
2022	Singapore	—	Did not participate
