= 2011 Women's World Floorball Championships =

Floorball competition

Tournament details
- Host country: Switzerland
- Venues: 2 (in 1 host city)
- Dates: 4–11 December 2011
- Teams: 16

Final positions
- Champions: Sweden

Tournament statistics
- Matches played: 43
- Goals scored: 460 (10.7 per match)
- Attendance: 30,700 (714 per match)
- Scoring leader(s): (Sweden) Emelie Lindström

Awards
- MVP: (Sweden) Sara Kristoffersson

The 2011 Women's World Floorball Championships were the eighth world championships in women's floorball. The tournament was held from 4 December to 11 December 2011 in St. Gallen, Switzerland. The matches took place in Athletik Zentrum and Kreuzbleichhalle.

Sweden won the tournament defeating Finland, 4-2, in the final-game.

== Qualifying ==
Under the IFF's new qualification system, the 23 countries registered for the world championships had to qualify for 16 spots. 8 of these spots had already been pre-determined, with the top 7 teams from the 2009 Women's World Floorball Championships A-Division and the top team from the B-Division automatically qualifying:

Australia	Czech Republic
Finland	Latvia
Norway	Russia
Sweden	Switzerland

The remaining 8 spots were determined from continental qualifying tournaments:

Asia/Oceania	Europe 1	Europe 2	North America
Japan	Germany	Poland	United States
	Denmark	Slovakia	
	Netherlands	Hungary	

== Championship results ==
=== Preliminary round ===
==== Group A ====
Team	Pld	W	D	L	GF	GA	GD	Pts
Switzerland	3	3	0	0	49	2	+47	6
Poland	3	2	0	1	12	12	0	4
Russia	3	1	0	2	9	30	−21	2
Netherlands	3	0	0	3	5	31	−26	0

December 4, 2011
13.30

Netherlands	2–5	Poland

St. Gallen, Switzerland
Kreuzbleichhalle

December 4, 2011
15.30

Switzerland	21–1	Russia

St. Gallen, Switzerland
Athletik Zentrum

December 5, 2011
13.30

Poland	7–1	Russia

St. Gallen, Switzerland
Kreuzbleichhalle

December 5, 2011
19.30

Netherlands	1–19	Switzerland

St. Gallen, Switzerland
Athletik Zentrum

December 7, 2011
19.30

Russia	7–2	Netherlands

St. Gallen, Switzerland
Kreuzbleichhalle

December 7, 2011
19.30

Poland	0–9	Switzerland

St. Gallen, Switzerland
Athletik Zentrum

==== Group B ====
Team	Pld	W	D	L	GF	GA	GD	Pts
Finland	3	3	0	0	26	2	+24	6
Latvia	3	2	0	1	19	11	+8	4
Germany	3	1	0	2	14	15	−1	2
Australia	3	0	0	3	3	34	−31	0

December 4, 2011
12.15

Germany	5–6	Latvia

St. Gallen, Switzerland
Athletik Zentrum

December 4, 2011
19.30

Australia	1–13	Finland

St. Gallen, Switzerland
Kreuzbleichhalle

December 5, 2011
16.30

Finland	4–0	Latvia

St. Gallen, Switzerland
Athletik Zentrum

December 5, 2011
16.30

Australia	0–8	Germany

St. Gallen, Switzerland
Kreuzbleichhalle

December 6, 2011
16.30

Latvia	13–2	Australia

St. Gallen, Switzerland
Kreuzbleichhalle

December 6, 2011
19.30

Finland	9–1	Germany

St. Gallen, Switzerland
Athletik Zentrum

==== Group C ====
Team	Pld	W	D	L	GF	GA	GD	Pts
Czech Republic	3	3	0	0	30	4	+26	6
Norway	3	2	0	1	12	5	+7	4
Slovakia	3	1	0	2	13	24	−11	2
Hungary	3	0	0	3	5	27	−22	0

December 4, 2011
16.30

Slovakia	10–4	Hungary

St. Gallen, Switzerland
Kreuzbleichhalle

December 4, 2011
18.30

Czech Republic	3–2	Norway

St. Gallen, Switzerland
Athletik Zentrum

December 6, 2011
13.30

Norway	5–2	Slovakia

St. Gallen, Switzerland
Kreuzbleichhalle

December 6, 2011
13.30

Hungary	1–12	Czech Republic

St. Gallen, Switzerland
Athletik Zentrum

December 7, 2011
13.30

Hungary	0–5	Norway

St. Gallen, Switzerland
Kreuzbleichhalle

December 7, 2011
16.30

Slovakia	1–15	Czech Republic

St. Gallen, Switzerland
Kreuzbleichhalle

==== Group D ====
Team	Pld	W	D	L	GF	GA	GD	Pts
Sweden	3	3	0	0	68	1	+67	6
Denmark	3	2	0	1	14	22	−8	4
United States	3	1	0	2	12	39	−27	2
Japan	3	0	0	3	5	37	−32	0

December 5, 2011
13.30

Japan	0–23	Sweden

St. Gallen, Switzerland
Athletik Zentrum

December 5, 2011
19.30

United States	5–6	Denmark

St. Gallen, Switzerland
Kreuzbleichhalle

December 6, 2011
16.30

Sweden	30–0	United States

St. Gallen, Switzerland
Athletik Zentrum

December 6, 2011
19.30

Denmark	7–2	Japan

St. Gallen, Switzerland
Kreuzbleichhalle

December 7, 2011
13.30

Japan	3–7	United States

St. Gallen, Switzerland
Athletik Zentrum

December 7, 2011
16.30

Sweden	15–1	Denmark

St. Gallen, Switzerland
Athletik Zentrum

=== Playoff round ===
Quarterfinals
A1	Switzerland	12
B2	Latvia	1
D1	Sweden	19
C2	Norway	0
C1	Czech Republic	5
D2	Denmark	1
B1	Finland	13
A2	Poland	2

Semifinals
Q1	Switzerland	2
Q4	Sweden	11
Q2	Czech Republic	0
Q3	Finland	6

Finals
W1	Sweden	4
W2	Finland	2
Third place
L1	Switzerland	2
L2	Czech Republic	3

==== Quarter finals ====
December 8, 2011
16.30

Sweden	19:0	Norway

St. Gallen, Switzerland
Athletik Zentrum

December 8, 2011
19.30

Switzerland	12–1	Latvia

St. Gallen, Switzerland
Athletik Zentrum

December 9, 2011
16.30

Finland	13–2	Poland

St. Gallen, Switzerland
Athletik Zentrum

December 9, 2011
19.30

Czech Republic	5–1	Denmark

St. Gallen, Switzerland
Athletik Zentrum

==== Semi-finals ====
December 10, 2011
16.10

Switzerland	2–11	Sweden

St. Gallen, Switzerland
Athletik Zentrum

December 10, 2011
19.10

Czech Republic	0–6	Finland

St. Gallen, Switzerland
Athletik Zentrum

==== Bronze medal game ====
December 11, 2011
12.00

Switzerland	2–3	Czech Republic

St. Gallen, Switzerland
Athletik Zentrum

==== Gold medal game ====
December 11, 2011
15.00

Sweden	4–2	Finland

St. Gallen, Switzerland
Athletik Zentrum

=== Placement round ===
==== 13-16 ====
December 8, 2011
13.30

Netherlands	2–1 (OT)	Australia

St. Gallen, Switzerland
Kreuzbleichhalle

December 8, 2011
16.30

Hungary	5–3	Japan

St. Gallen, Switzerland
Kreuzbleichhalle

==== 9-12 ====
December 8, 2011
13.30

Slovakia	3–6	United States

St. Gallen, Switzerland
Athletik Zentrum

December 8, 2011
19.30

Russia	7–6 (OT)	Germany

St. Gallen, Switzerland
Kreuzbleichhalle

==== 15th Place match ====
December 9, 2011
13.30

Australia	5–2	Japan

St. Gallen, Switzerland
Kreuzbleichhalle

==== 13th Place match ====
December 9, 2011
16.30

Netherlands	5–3	Hungary

St. Gallen, Switzerland
Kreuzbleichhalle

==== 11th Place match ====
December 9, 2011
19.30

Germany	4–3 (OT)	Slovakia

St. Gallen, Switzerland
Kreuzbleichhalle

==== 9th Place match ====
December 9, 2011
13.30

Russia	2–4	United States

St. Gallen, Switzerland
Athletik Zentrum

==== 5-8 ====
December 10, 2011
10.00

Latvia	3–4	Norway

St. Gallen, Switzerland
Athletik Zentrum

December 10, 2011
13.00

Denmark	1–4	Poland

St. Gallen, Switzerland
Athletik Zentrum

==== 5th Place match ====
December 11, 2011
9.00

Norway	5–4 (PS)	Poland

St. Gallen, Switzerland
Athletik Zentrum

== Leading scorers ==
Player		GP	G	A	PTS	PIM
(Sweden)	Emelie Lindström	6	9	16	25	2
(Sweden)	Sara Kristoffersson	6	13	9	22	2
(Sweden)	Therese Karlsson	6	13	8	21	0
(Switzerland)	Julia Suter	6	8	8	16	2
(Switzerland)	Mirca Anderegg	6	7	9	16	2
(Sweden)	Amanda Larsson	6	12	3	15	0
(Sweden)	Josefina Eiremo	6	10	5	15	2
(Sweden)	Emelie Wibron	6	7	7	14	2
(Sweden)	Victoria Wikström	6	5	9	14	0
(Switzerland)	Corin Rüttimann	6	9	4	13	0

== All-Star team ==
- Goalkeeper: (Czech Republic) Jana Christianová
- Defense: (Sweden) Emelie Wibron, (Finland) Tia Ukkonen
- Forward: (Sweden) Emelie Lindström, (Switzerland) Corin Rüttimann, (Sweden) Sara Kristoffersson
- ASICS Golden Floorball Shoe MVP Trophy: (Sweden) Sara Kristoffersson

== Ranking ==
2011 Women's World Floorball Championship winners Sweden; 5th World title

Official 2011 Rankings according to the IFF

Rk.	Team
1st place, gold medalist(s)	Sweden
2nd place, silver medalist(s)	Finland
3rd place, bronze medalist(s)	Czech Republic
4.	Switzerland
5.	Norway
6.	Poland
7.	Latvia
8.	Denmark
9.	United States
10.	Russia
11.	Germany
12.	Slovakia
13.	Netherlands
14.	Hungary
15.	Australia
16.	Japan
