= Germany women's national floorball team =

- IFF Ranking: 10th (2025)

Germany women's national floorball team is the national team of Germany in women's floorball.

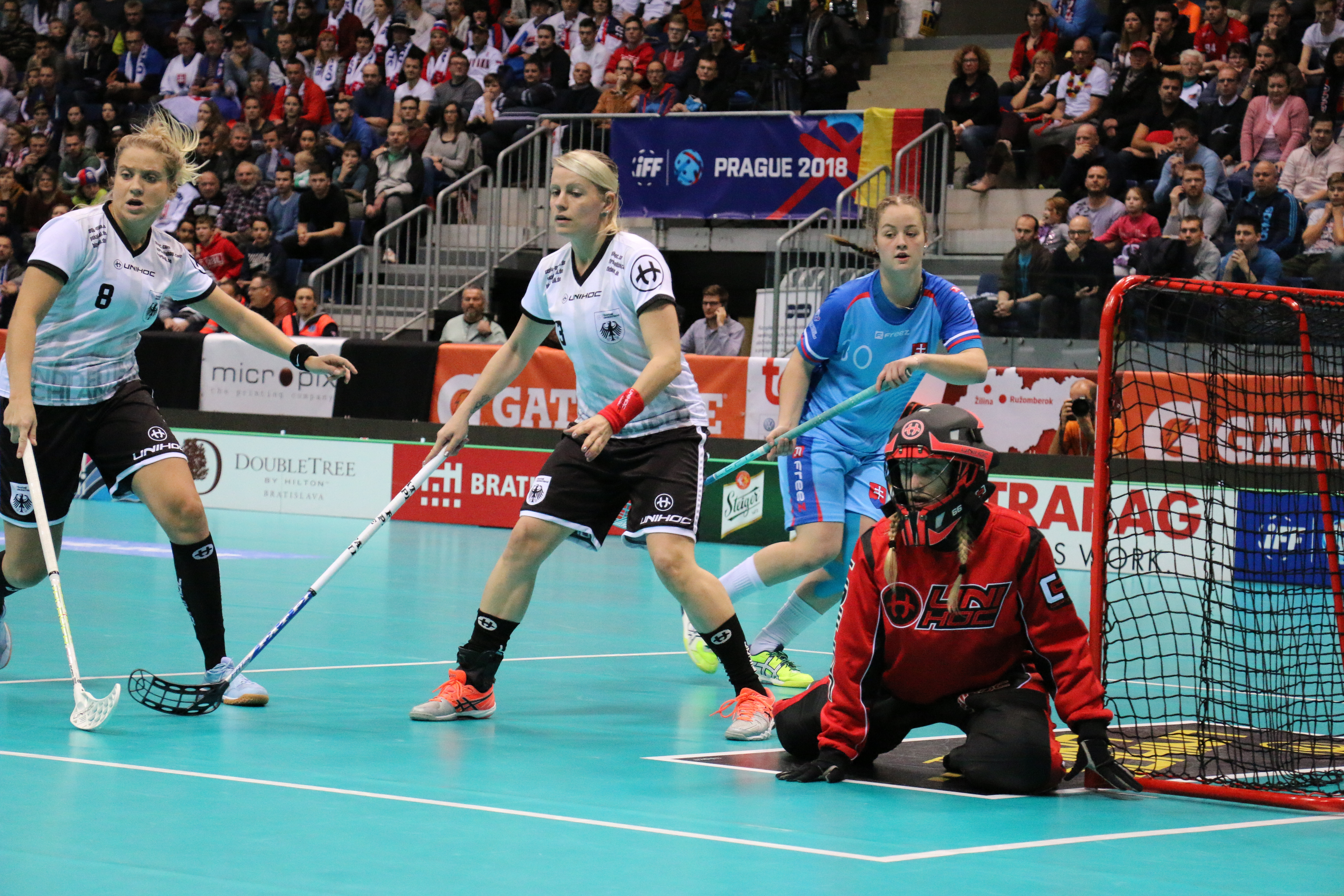
Players of the German national team (in white and red) in the 2017 World Championships round of 16 match against Slovakia

The team participated in the only 1995 European Championships and all subsequent Women's World Floorball Championships (in 2005, 2007 and 2009 only in Division B). Its best results are two sixth-place finishes at the 1999 and 2015 World Championships.

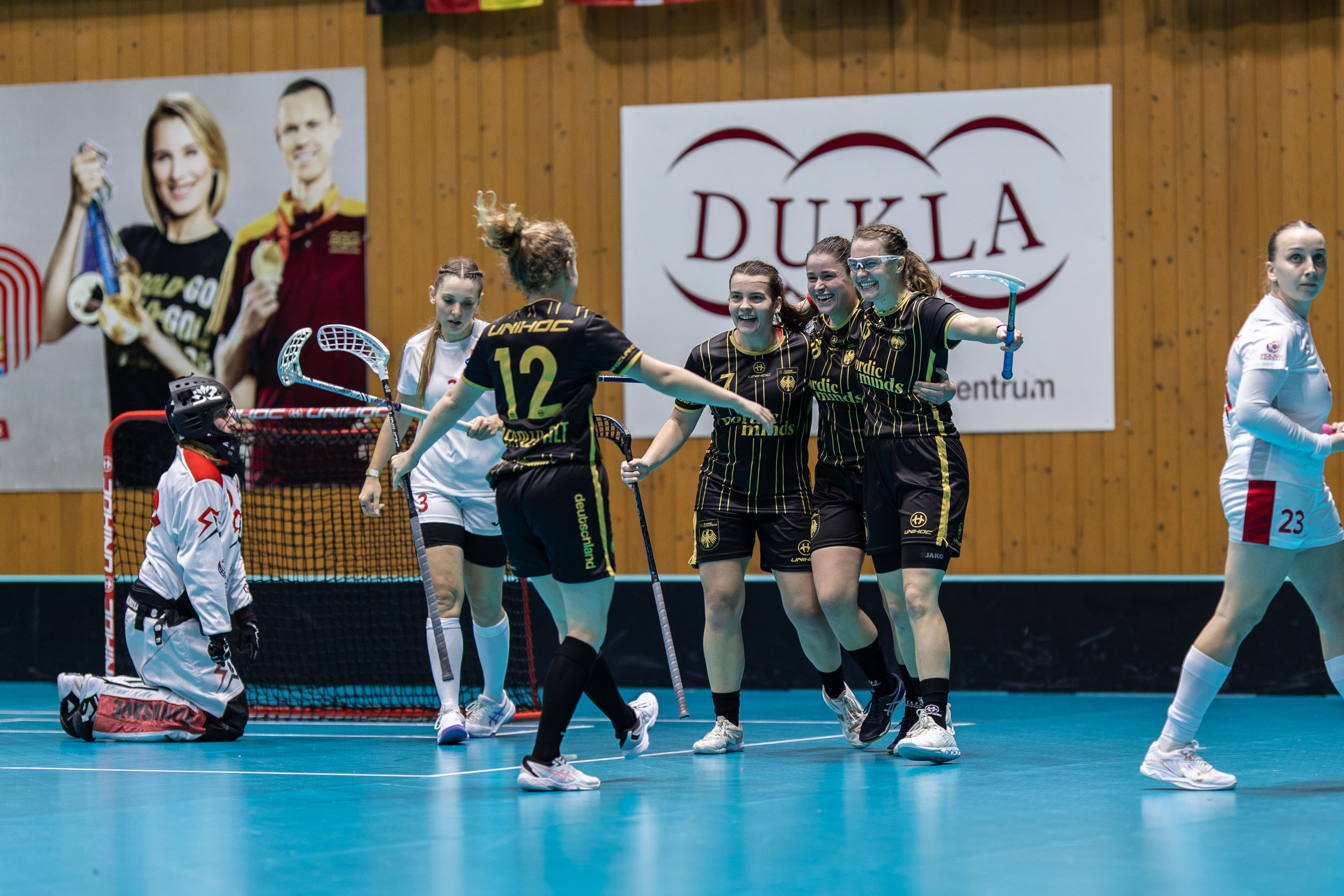
Players of the German national team celebrating a goal in a friendly match against Poland in 2023

After two tenth-place finishes at the last two championships in 2023 and 2025, Germany is ranked tenth in the IFF rankings.

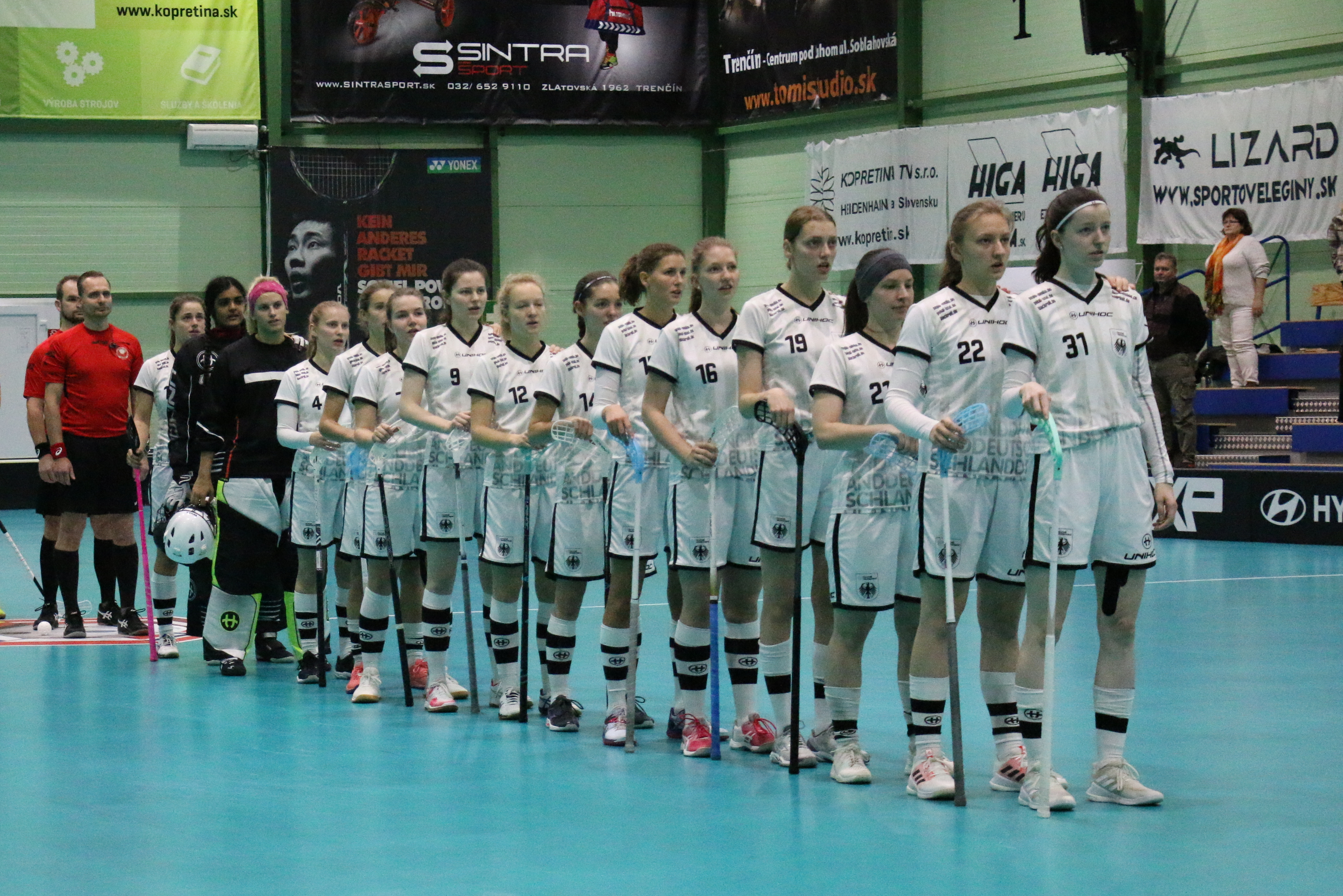
German national team before a friendly match in 2021

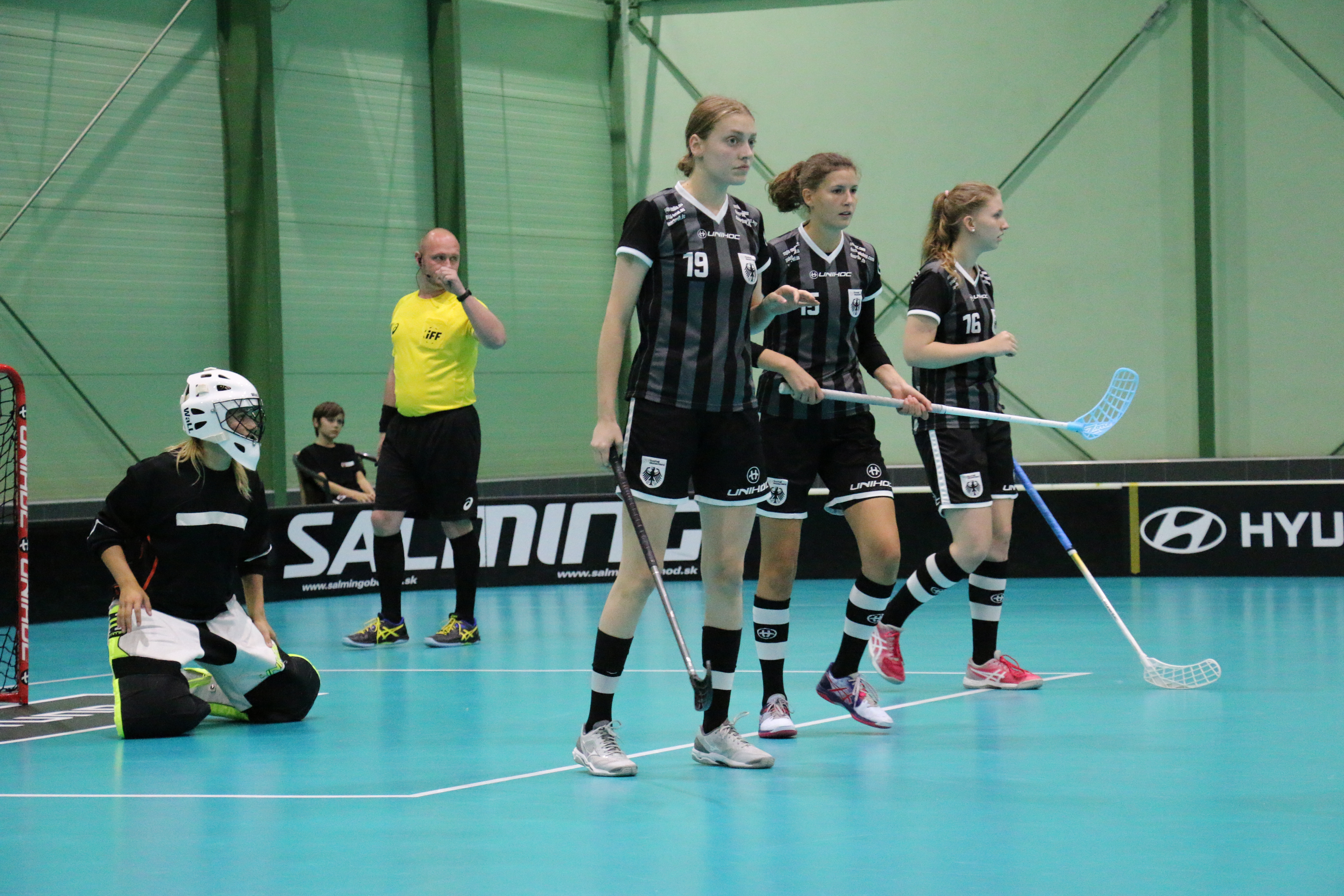
Players of the German national team in a friendly match in 2021

== World Championships ==
Year	Hosting Country	Rank	Final match
1997	Finland	8th place	Latvia 3 : 6
1999	Sweden	6th place	Czech Republic 4 : 8
2001	Latvia	7th place	Austria 2 : 1
2003	Switzerland	8th place	Czech Republic 0 : 4
2005 B	Singapore	12th place	Singapore 3 : 4 OT
2007 B	Denmark	12th place	Poland 1 : 3
2009 B	Sweden	13th place	Singapore 4 : 1
2011	Switzerland	11th place	Slovakia 4 : 3 OT
2013	Czech Republic	8th place	Poland 1 : 3
2015	Finland	6th place	Latvia 2 : 5
2017	Slovakia	10th place	Denmark 3 : 4
2019	Switzerland	7th place	Latvia 4 : 3
2021	Sweden	10th place	Latvia 5 : 7
2023	Singapore	10th place	Japan 1 : 4
2025	Czech Republic	10th place	Poland 1 : 5

== European Championships ==
Year	Hosting Country	Rank	Final match
1995	Switzerland	8th place	Latvia 2 : 4
