= Denmark women's national floorball team =

- IFF Ranking: 8th (2025)

Denmark women's national floorball team is the national team of Denmark in women's floorball.

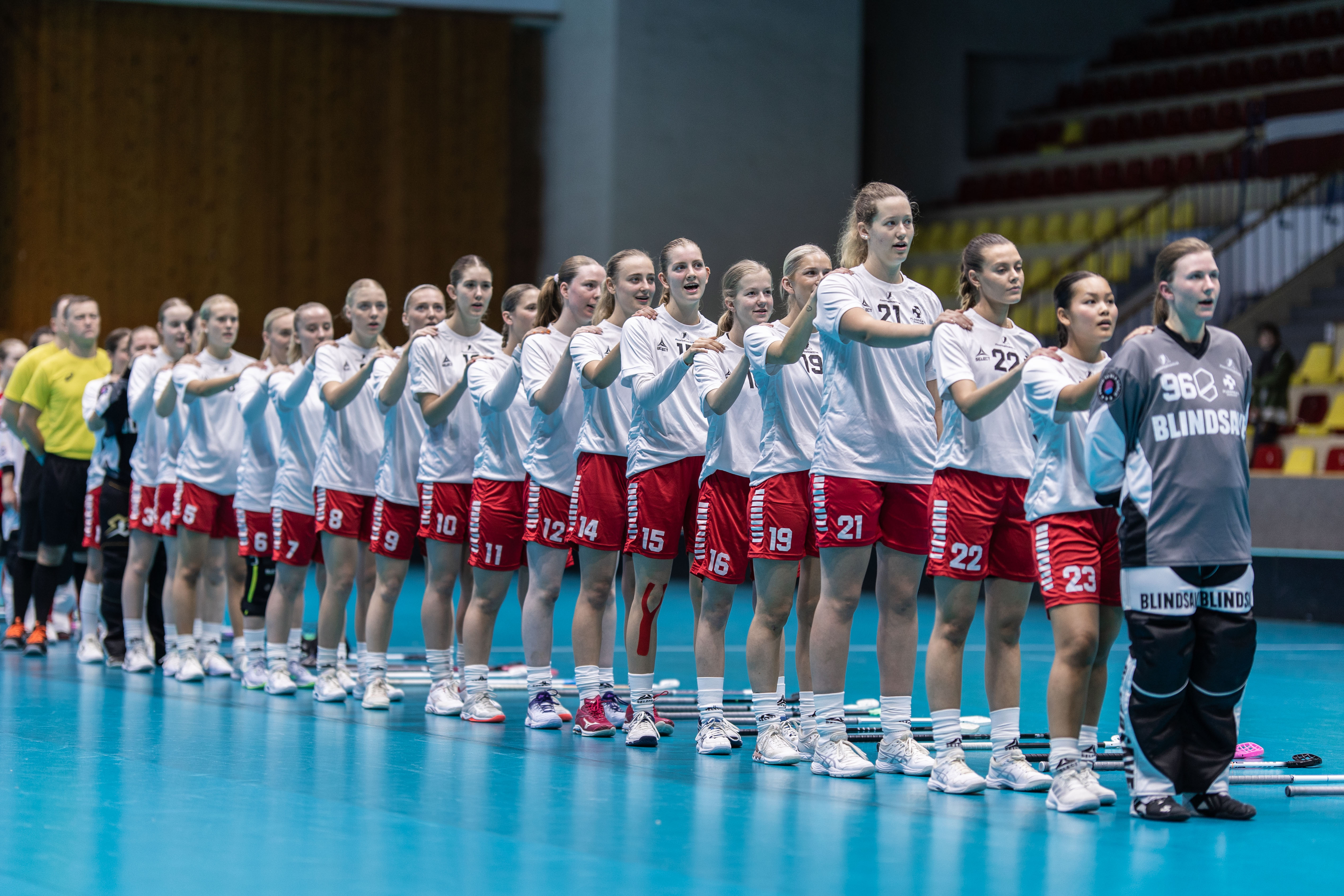
Players of the Danish national team in a friendly match in 2023

The team made its debut in Division B at the 1999 World Championships. It first participated in the main tournament on home soil at the 2007 World Championships and has since competed in all eight subsequent championships. The team's best result is sixth place at the 2007 tournament.

After finishing eighth at both the 2023 and 2025 tournaments, Denmark holds the eighth place in the IFF rankings.

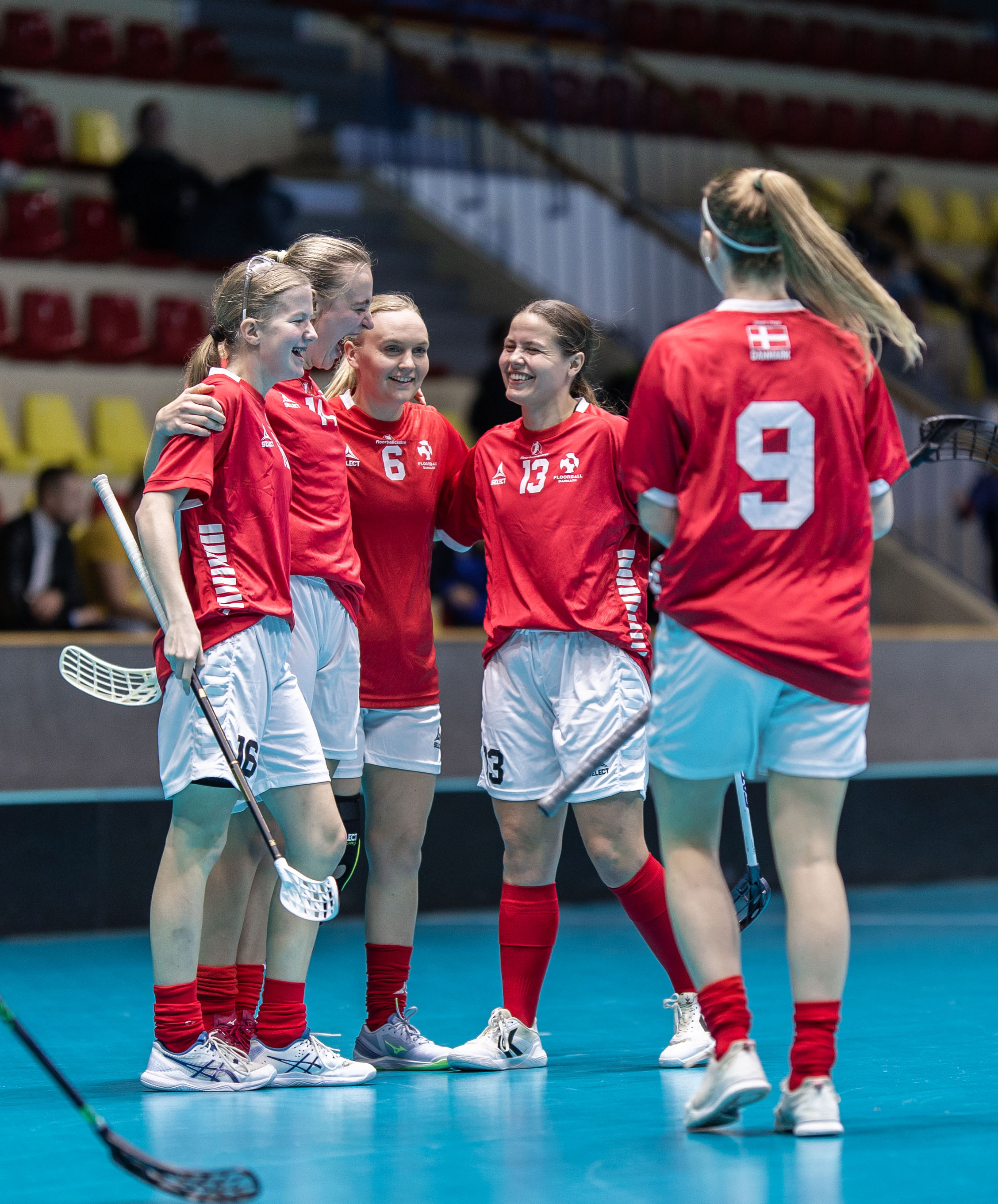
Players of the Danish national team in a friendly match in 2023

== World Championships ==
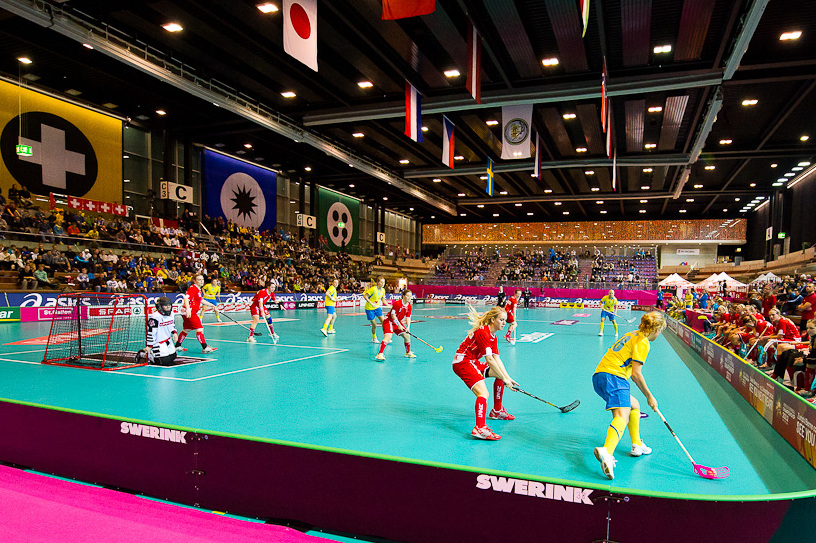
The Danish national team (in red) in a match against Sweden at the 2011 World Championship

Year	Hosting Country	Rank	Final match
1999 B	Sweden	10th place	Round-robin format
2001 B	Latvia	10th place	Russia 1–14
2003 B	Switzerland	11th place	Italy 8–2
2005 B	Singapore	9th place	United States 7–4
2007	Denmark	6th place	Czech Republic 2–6
2009	Sweden	9th place	United States 3–2
2011	Switzerland	8th place	Poland 1–4 (Note: Play-off round for 5th–8th place; no 7th-place match was held.)
2013	Czech Republic	11th place	Australia 9–4
2015	Finland	10th place	Norway 0–2
2017	Slovakia	9th place	Germany 4–3
2019	Switzerland	10th place	Norway 2–3
2021	Sweden	8th place	Norway 2–3 OT
2023	Singapore	8th place	Latvia 4–6
2025	Czech Republic	8th place	Slovakia 6–7
