= Latvia women's national floorball team =

- IFF Ranking: 5th (2025)

Latvia women's national floorball team is the national team of Latvia in women's floorball.

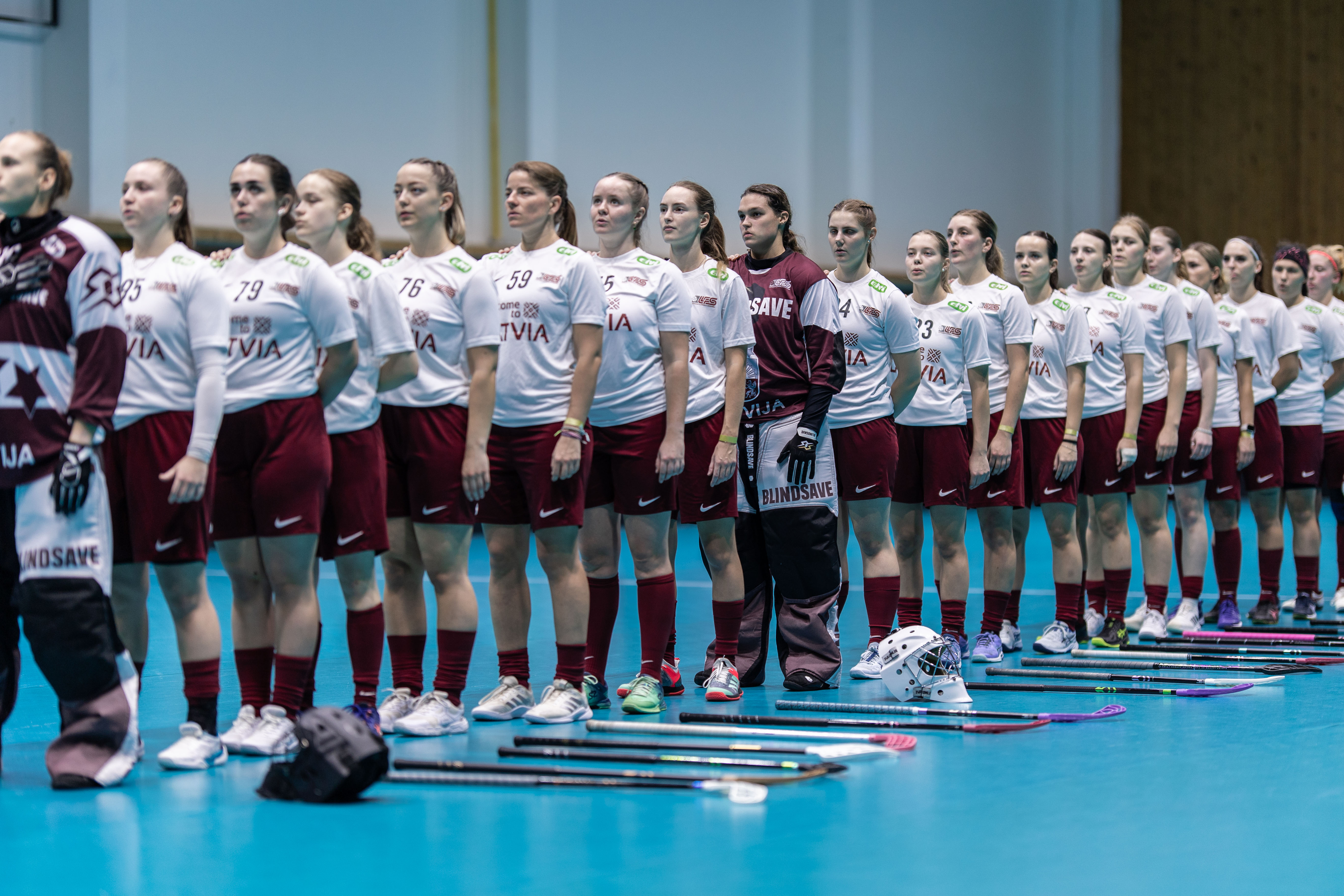
Latvia national team before a friendly match in 2023

The team has participated in every World Championships and in the only European Championships. Its best result is a semifinal appearance and fourth place at the 2007 World Championships.

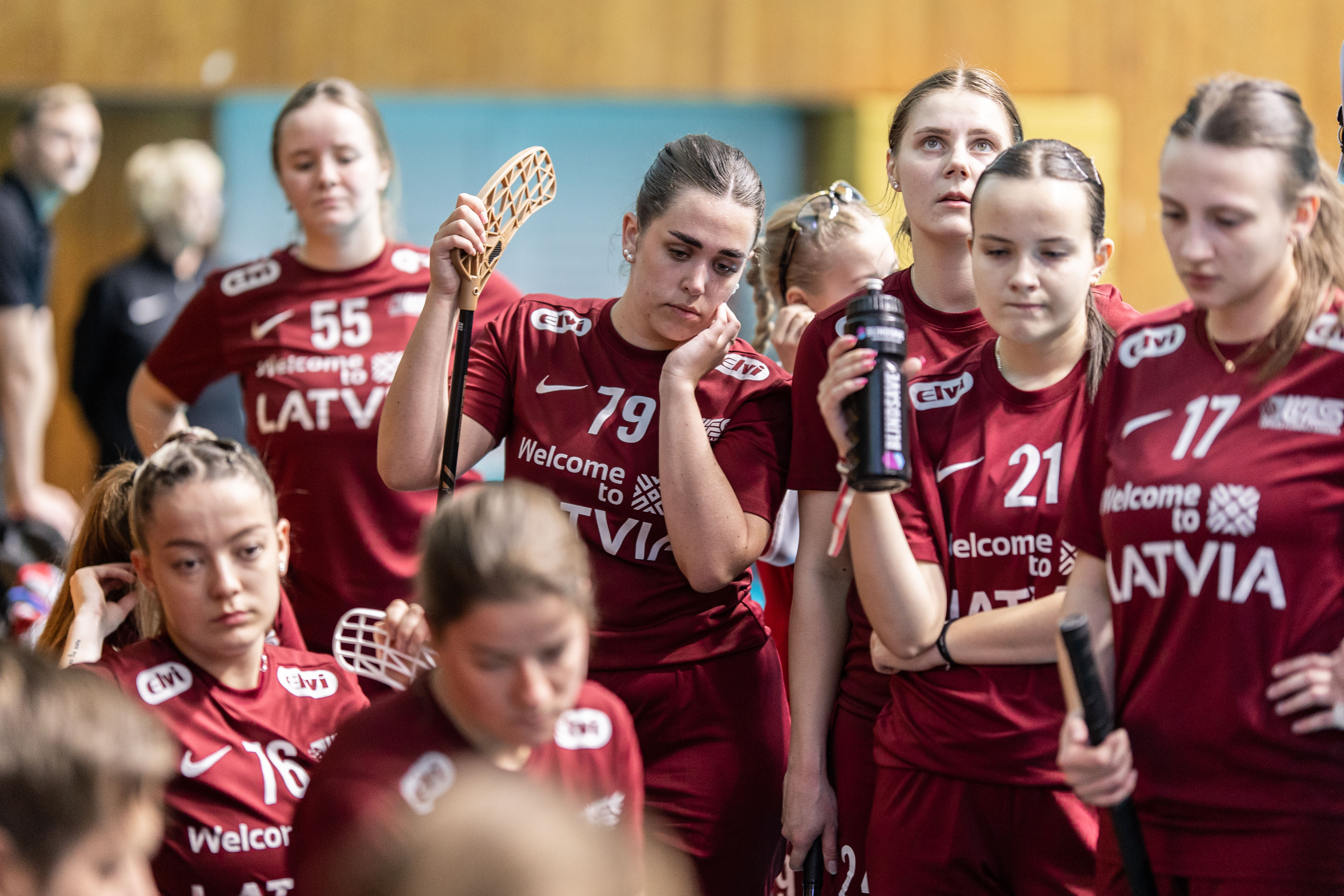
Players of the Latvian national team in a friendly match in 2023

After finishing seventh and fifth at the last two championships in 2023 and 2025, Latvia is ranked fifth in the IFF rankings (behind Sweden and ahead of Slovakia).

== World Championships ==
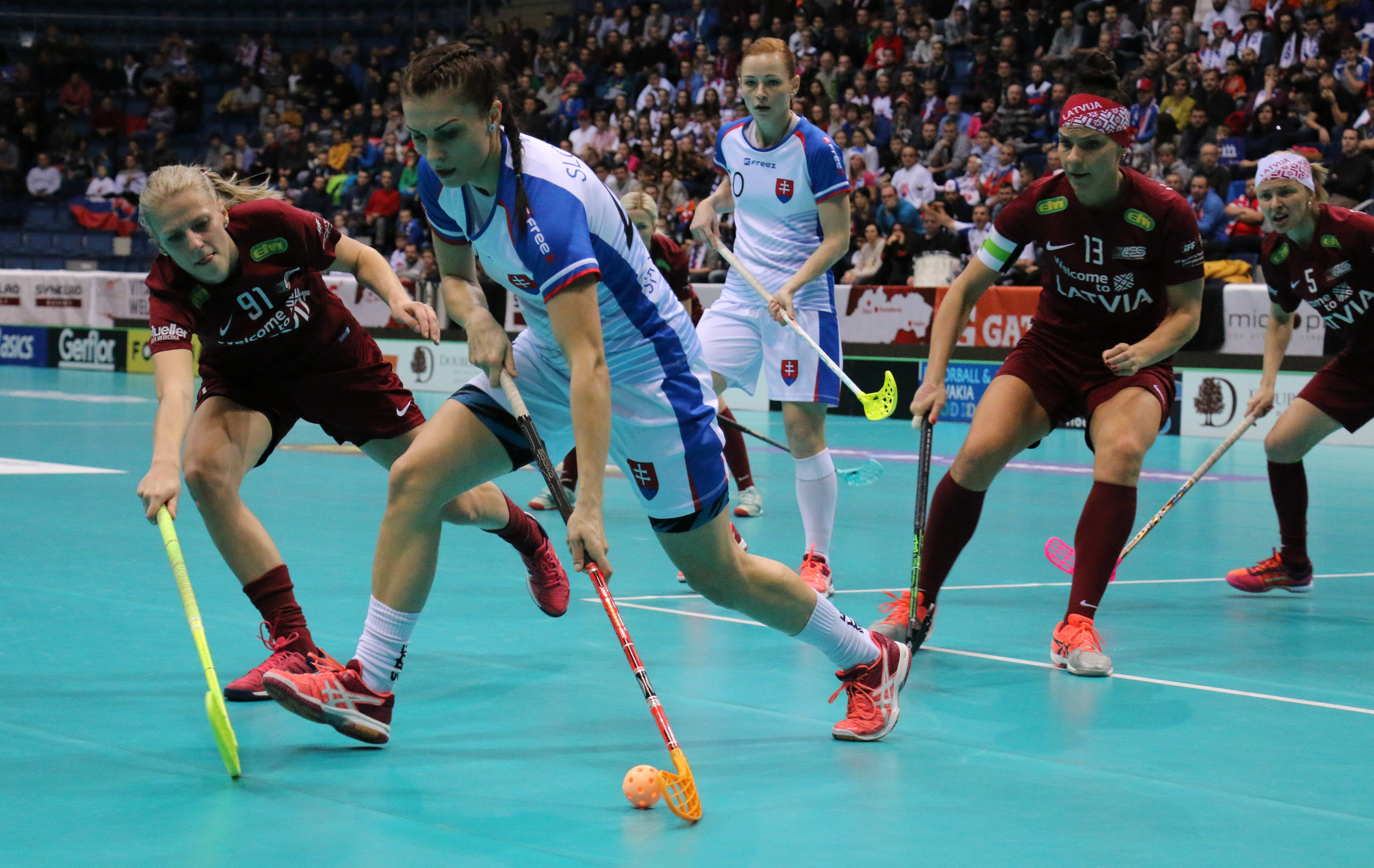
Latvia players (in red) in the fifth place match against Slovakia at the 2017 World Championships

Year	Hosting Country	Rank	Final match
1997	Finland	7th place	Germany 6–3
1999	Sweden	7th place	Forfeit (Note: Russia withdrew and was placed into Division B. Latvia automatically finished in 7th place.)
2001	Latvia	6th place	Czech Republic 4–5 PS
2003	Switzerland	6th place	Russia 2–9
2005	Singapore	5th place	Russia 10–2
2007	Denmark	4th place	Switzerland 1–7
2009	Sweden	6th place	Russia 3–4 OT
2011	Switzerland	7th place	Norway 3–4 (Note: First playoff round for 5th–8th place; no 7th place match played.)
2013	Czech Republic	5th place	Norway 4–3 OT
2015	Finland	5th place	Germany 5–2
2017	Slovakia	6th place	Slovakia 4–6
2019	Switzerland	8th place	Germany 3–4
2021	Sweden	9th place	Germany 7–5
2023	Singapore	7th place	Denmark 6–4
2025	Czech Republic	5th place	Norway 5–3

Latvia players (in red) in a match against Denmark at the 2025 World Championships

== European Championships ==
Year	Hosting Country	Rank	Final match
1995	Switzerland	7th place	Germany 4–2

== See also ==
- Latvia men's national floorball team
- Latvia women's national under-19 floorball team
