= Poland women's national floorball team =

- IFF Ranking: 7th (2025)

Poland women's national floorball team is the national team of Poland in women's floorball.

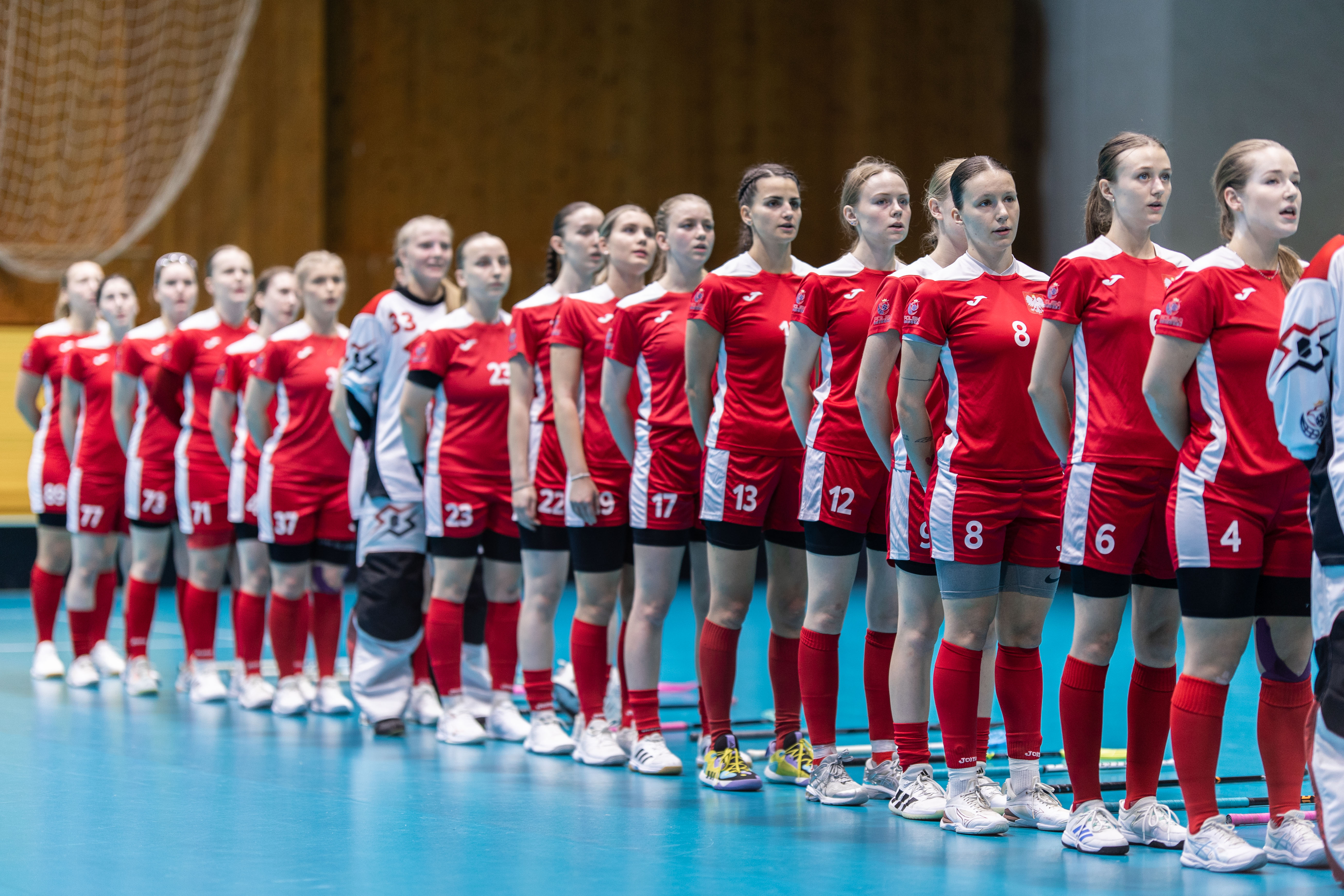
Players of the Polish national team in a friendly match in 2023

The team made its debut in Division B at the 2001 World Championships. It first participated in the main tournament in 2009 and has since competed in all eight subsequent championships. The team's best results are fifth-place finishes at the 2019 and 2021 World Championships.

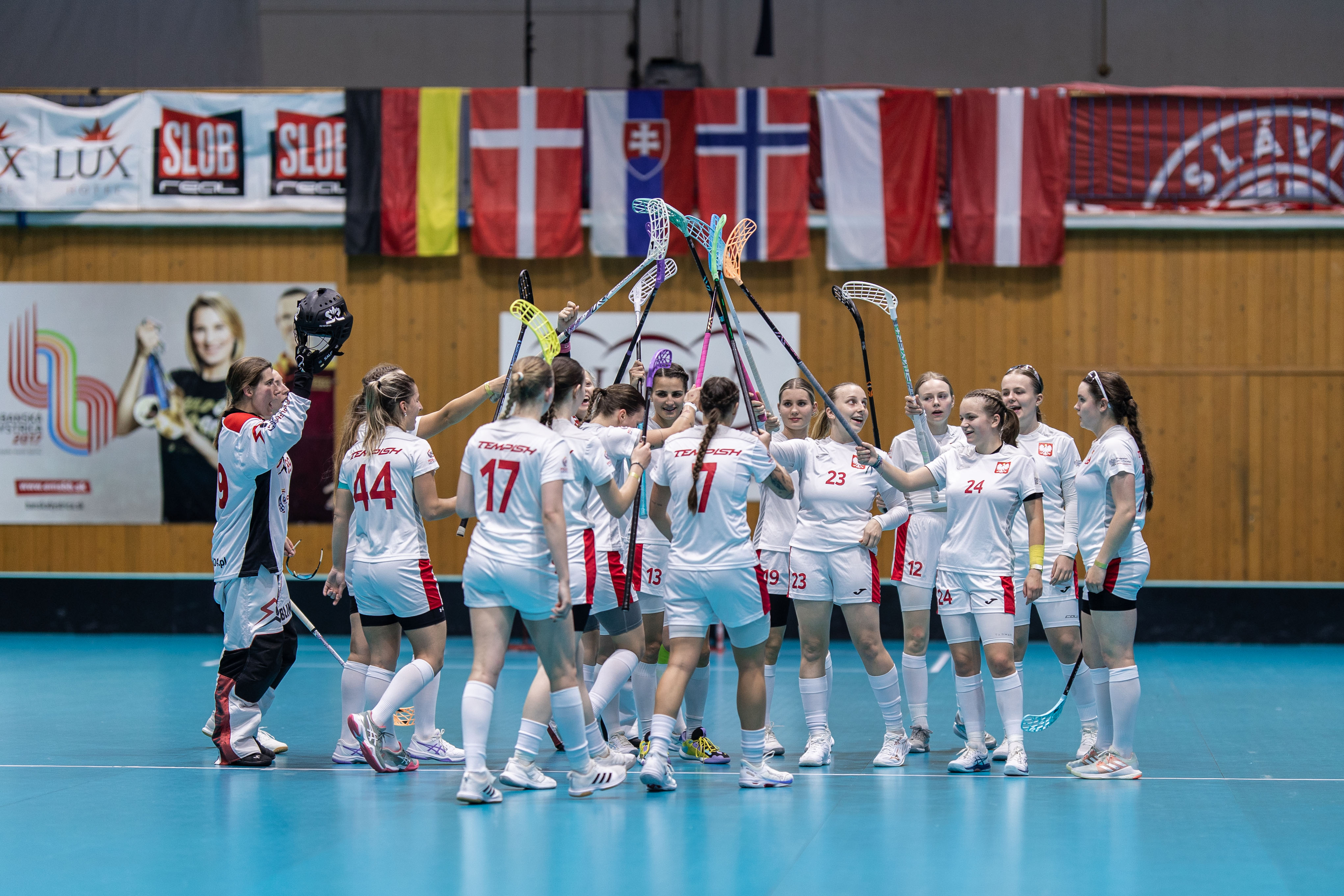
Players of the Poland national team in a friendly match in 2023

After finishing sixth and ninth at the last two championships in 2023 and 2025, Poland is ranked seventh in the IFF rankings (behind Slovakia and ahead of Denmark).

The Poland national team (in red) in a match against Finland at the 2025 World Championship

== World Championships ==
Year	Hosting Country	Rank	Final match
2001 B	Latvia	12th place	Singapore 2–4
2003 B	Switzerland	10nd place	Japan 6–7 OT
2005	–		
2007 B	Denmark	11th place	Germany 3–1
2009	Sweden	8th place	Norway 5–6 PS
2011	Switzerland	6th place	Norway 4–5 PS
2013	Czech Republic	7th place	Germany 3–1
2015	Finland	7th place	Slovakia 2–0
2017	Slovakia	7th place	Norway 12–3
2019	Switzerland	5th place	Slovakia 8–4
2021	Sweden	5th place	Slovakia 4–3
2023	Singapore	6th place	Slovakia 4–7
2025	Czech Republic	9th place	Germany 5–1
