= 2003 Women's World Floorball Championships =

Floorball competition

Tournament details
- Host country: Switzerland
- Venues: 3 (in 3 host cities)
- Dates: 18–24 May
- Teams: 18

Final positions
- Champions: Sweden (2nd title)
- Runners-up: Switzerland
- Third place: Finland

Tournament statistics
- Matches played: 45
- Goals scored: 395 (8.78 per match)
- Attendance: 19,404 (431 per match)
- Scoring leader(s): Anne Suomalainen (FIN); Johanna Ekeroth (SWE); Jonna Kettunen (FIN) (8 points)

Awards
- MVP: Anne Suomalainen (FIN); Johanna Ekeroth (SWE)

The 2019 Women's World Floorball Championships was the fourth edition of Women's World Floorball Championship. It was held for the first time in Switzerland, in the cities of Bern, Muri bei Bern (Gümligen), and Wünnewil-Flamatt from 18 to 24 May 2003.

Sweden won the tournament, their second title defeating Switzerland, 8–1, in the final-game.

The competition was expanded to 18 teams divided into two divisions. Italy, Malaysia and United States made their first appearances in the women's floorball world championships.

== Division A ==
The two groups consisted of the seven best placed teams in the previous world championships plus Russia who won the B-division in that tournament. With Norway beating Sweden in the first round of the groupstage, Sweden received their first loss against another team than Finland. Despite this, Sweden ended up winning the tournament. With Germany losing the 7th-place match to the Czech Republic, Germany were relegated to division B for the next tournament.

The two best placed teams of each group advances to semifinals while the two lower placed teams plays placement matches for 5th and 7th place respectively.

=== Preliminary round ===
==== Group A ====
Team	Pld	W	D	L	GF	GA	GD	Pts
Finland	3	3	0	0	23	3	+20	6
Switzerland	3	2	0	1	17	6	+11	4
Russia	3	1	0	2	6	25	−19	2
Czech Republic	3	0	0	3	6	22	−16	0

18 May 2003; 15:00	Finland	3–1 (1–0, 1–1, 1–0)	Switzerland	Gümlingen; Attendance: 1,050

19 May 2003; 14:00	Czech Republic	2–5 (0–2, 1–2, 1–1)	Russia	Gümlingen; Attendance: 420

20 May 2003; 20:00	Switzerland	8–2 (3–1, 1–0, 4–1)	Czech Republic	Gümlingen; Attendance: 825

20 May 2003; 20:00	Russia	0–15 (0–5, 0–5, 0–5)	Finland	Wünnewil; Attendance: 758

21 May 2003; 17:00	Finland	9–2 (3–1, 3–1, 3–0)	Czech Republic	Gümlingen; Attendance: 270

21 May 2003; 20:00	Switzerland	8–1 (2–0, 2–1, 4–0)	Russia	Gümlingen; Attendance: 915

==== Group B ====
Team	Pld	W	D	L	GF	GA	GD	Pts
Norway	3	3	0	0	18	4	+14	6
Sweden	3	2	0	1	29	6	+23	4
Latvia	3	1	0	2	8	24	−16	2
Germany	3	0	0	3	8	29	−21	0

19 May 2003; 17:00	Latvia	5–4 (1–3, 2–0, 2–1)	Germany	Gümlingen; Attendance: 220

19 May 2003; 20:00	Sweden	1–2 (0–0, 1–0, 0–2)	Norway	Gümlingen; Attendance: 730

20 May 2003; 14:00	Norway	10–1 (2–1, 3–0, 5–0)	Germany	Gümlingen; Attendance: 320

20 May 2003; 17:00	Sweden	14–1 (4–0, 6–0, 4–1)	Latvia	Wünnewil; Attendance: 450

21 May 2003; 14:00	Norway	6–2 (2–1, 3–0, 1–1)	Latvia	Gümlingen; Attendance: 180

21 May 2003; 20:00	Germany	3–14 (0–5, 2–5, 1–4)	Sweden	Wünnewil; Attendance: 711

=== Final stage ===
Semifinals
B1	Norway	3
A2	Switzerland	7
A1	Finland	4
B2	Sweden	5

Finals
Switzerland	1
Sweden	8
Third place
Norway	2
Finland	4

==== Semifinals ====
23 May 2003; 17:00	Finland	4–5 (3–0, 1–2, 0–3)	Sweden	Wankdorfhalle, Bern; Attendance: 850

Game reference

23 May 2003; 20:00	Norway	3–7 (0–1, 1–4, 2–2)	Switzerland	Wankdorfhalle, Bern; Attendance: 910

Game reference

==== 5th-place game ====
24 May 2003; 11:00	Latvia	2–9 (0–3, 1–2, 1–4)	Russia	Wankdorfhalle, Bern; Attendance: 280

Game reference

==== 7th-place game ====
24 May 2003; 14:00	Czech Republic	4–0 (2–0, 0–0, 2–0)	Germany	Wankdorfhalle, Bern; Attendance: 540

Game reference

==== Bronze-medal game ====
24 May 2003; 17:00	Norway	2–4 (0–2, 0–2, 2–0)	Finland	Wankdorfhalle, Bern; Attendance: 1,950

Game reference

==== Final ====
24 May 2003; 20:00	Switzerland	1–8 (1–5, 0–2, 0–1)	Sweden	Wankdorfhalle, Bern; Attendance: 2,800

Game reference

=== Statistics ===
==== Top scorers ====
	Player	G	A	P
1	Anne Suomalainen (FIN); Johanna Ekeroth (SWE)	8	1	9
3	Jonna Kettunen (FIN)	8	0	8
4	Lidiia Varshavskaia (RUS)	5	2	7
5	Hermine Dahlerus (SWE)	4	3	7
6	Petra Mäntynen (FIN)	0	7	7
7	Martina Metzäner (SUI)	4	2	6
8	Suvi Saukko (FIN); Baiba Jurusa (LAT); Satu Schilcher (FIN)	3	3	6

== Division B ==
The second division consisted of all the teams from the same division in the previous tournament minus Russia who were promoted and Great Britain who didn't attend to the tournament. Austria, who were relegated from first division in the previous tournament and the three new teams: Italy, Malaysia and United States also played in the second division. Japan ended up winning the B-final versus Poland and became promoted to the first division for the next tournament.

The two best placed teams in each group advances to play B-semifinals while the lower placed teams plays placement matches versus the corresponding team from the other group.

=== Preliminary round ===
==== Group C ====
Team	Pld	W	D	L	GF	GA	GD	Pts
Japan	4	4	0	0	27	11	+16	8
Poland	4	3	0	1	24	15	+9	6
United States	4	2	0	2	21	19	+2	4
Austria	4	1	0	3	16	16	0	2
Malaysia	4	0	0	4	8	35	−27	0

18 May 2003; 10:00	Austria	3–4 (1–1, 1–2, 1–1)	Poland	Gümlingen; Attendance: 211

18 May 2003; 18:00	Malaysia	1–8 (0–2, 0–2, 1–4)	Austria	Gümlingen; Attendance: 150

18 May 2003; 10:00	Japan	8–4 (1–4, 5–0, 2–0)	United States	Wünnewil; Attendance: 175

19 May 2003; 11:00	United States	7–4 (0–1, 5–3, 2–0)	Austria	Wünnewil; Attendance: 246

19 May 2003; 11:00	Poland	5–6 (0–2, 2–1, 3–3)	Japan	Gümlingen; Attendance: 107

19 May 2003; 20:00	Poland	9–5 (3–1, 4–3, 2–1)	Malaysia	Wünnewil; Attendance: 112

20 May 2003; 11:00	Austria	1–4 (0–1, 1–2, 0–1)	Japan	Wünnewil; Attendance: 274

20 May 2003; 17:00	Malaysia	1–9 (0–5, 0–1, 1–3)	United States	Wünnewil; Attendance: 232

20 May 2003; 11:00	United States	1–6 (1–1, 0–2, 0–3)	Poland	Gümlingen; Attendance: 120

20 May 2003; 17:00	Japan	9–1 (2–0, 3–1, 4–0)	Malaysia	Wünnewil; Attendance: 315

==== Group D ====
Team	Pld	W	D	L	GF	GA	GD	Pts
Denmark	4	4	0	0	27	10	+17	8
Italy	4	2	0	2	12	12	0	4
Singapore	4	1	1	2	23	23	0	3
Australia	4	1	1	2	16	21	−5	3
Hungary	4	1	0	3	9	21	−12	2

18 May 2003; 10:00	Denmark	8–4 (4–1, 2–1, 2–2)	Singapore	Wünnewil; Attendance: 130

18 May 2003; 13:00	Australia	2–3 (1–2, 0–1, 1–0)	Hungary	Wünnewil; Attendance: 103

18 May 2003; 21:00	Singapore	8–8 (1–3, 4–4, 3–1, 0–0)	Australia	Wünnewil; Attendance: 67

18 May 2003; 21:00	Italy	2–4 (1–1, 0–1, 1–2)	Denmark	Gümlingen; Attendance: 230

19 May 2003; 14:00	Hungary	2–6 (1–1, 1–3, 0–2)	Denmark	Wünnewil; Attendance: 327

19 May 2003; 17:00	Singapore	3–4 (2–3, 1–0, 0–1)	Italy	Wünnewil; Attendance: 163

20 May 2003; 11:00	Denmark	9–2 (3–0, 3–0, 3–2)	Australia	Gümlingen; Attendance: 95

20 May 2003; 14:00	Italy	5–1 (1–0, 3–0, 1–1)	Hungary	Wünnewil; Attendance: 324

21 May 2003; 11:00	Hungary	3–8 (0–2, 1–4, 2–2)	Singapore	Wünnewil; Attendance: 150

21 May 2003; 14:00	Australia	4–1 (0–0, 2–0, 2–1)	Italy	Wünnewil; Attendance: 427

=== Final stage ===
Semifinals
C1	Japan	5
D2	Italy	4
D1	Denmark	3
C2	Poland	4

Finals
Japan	7
Poland	6
Third place
Italy	2
Denmark	8

==== B-Semifinals ====
22 May 2003; 18:00	Japan	5–4 (0–1, 3–1, 2–2)	Italy	Gümlingen; Attendance: 380

22 May 2003; 21:00	Denmark	3–4 PS (1–1, 2–0, 0–2, 0–0, 0–1)	Poland	Gümlingen; Attendance: 350

==== 17th-place match ====
22 May 2003; 09:00	Hungary	4–2 (1–0, 1–1, 2–1)	Malaysia	Gümlingen; Attendance: 67

==== 15th-place match ====
22 May 2003; 12:00	Austria	7–3 (2–1, 2–2, 3–0)	Australia	Gümlingen; Attendance: 99

==== 13th-place match ====
22 May 2003; 15:00	Singapore	5–3 (1–1, 2–0, 2–2)	United States	Gümlingen; Attendance: 160

==== 11th-place match ====
23 May 2003; 21:00	Italy	2–8 (0–3, 1–1, 1–4)	Denmark	Gümlingen; Attendance: 67

==== 9th-place match ====
23 May 2003; 14:00	Japan	7–6 OT (2–2, 2–3, 2–1, 1–0)	Poland	Gümlingen; Attendance: 144

=== Statistics ===
==== Top scorers ====
	Player	G	A	P
1	Miho Koike (JPN)	11	5	16
2	Sachi Yokoe (JPN)	8	7	15
3	Chikae Ogawa (JPN)	6	8	14
4	Monika Waksmundzka (POL)	10	3	13
5	Ayako Takahashi (JPN)	10	2	12
6	Carmen Wastl (AUT); Jill Quek (SIN)	7	5	12
8	Karina Madsen (DEN)	10	1	11
9	Annukka Muuri (USA)	7	4	11
10	Johanna Breiding (USA)	6	4	10

== Final standings ==
Division A

1st place, gold medalist(s)	Sweden
2nd place, silver medalist(s)	Switzerland
3rd place, bronze medalist(s)	Finland
4	Norway
5	Russia
6	Latvia
7	Czech Republic
8	Germany

*Germany relegated to division B for 2005

Division B

1	Japan
2	Poland
3	Denmark
4	Italy
5	Singapore
6	United States
7	Austria
8	Australia
9	Hungary
10	Malaysia

*Japan promoted to division A for 2005

== All-star team ==
Goalkeeper: Kari Hånsnar Rinne (NOR)
Defenders: Simone Berner (SUI) and Jenny Magnusson (SWE)
Centre: Marisa Mazzarelli (SUI)
Forwards: Hermine Dahlerus (SWE) and Suvi Saukko (FIN)

MVP: Anne Suomalainen (FIN) and Johanna Ekeroth (SWE)
