= Netherlands women's national floorball team =

Netherlands women's national floorball team is the national team of the Netherlands. At the 2005 Women's World Floorball Championships in Singapore, the team finished seventh in the B-Division. At the 2007 Women's World Floorball Championships in Frederikshavn, the team finished fourth in the B-Division.
