= Hungary women's national floorball team =

Hungary women's national floorball team is the national team of Hungary. At the 2001 Women's World Floorball Championships in Riga, Latvia, the team finished seventh in the B-Division. At the 2003 Women's World Floorball Championships in Germany, the team finished ninth in the B-Division. At the 2005 Women's World Floorball Championships in Singapore, the team finished sixth in the B-Division. At the 2007 Women's World Floorball Championships in Frederikshavn, Denmark, the team finished third in the B-Division. At the 2013 Women's World Floorball Championships in Brno and Ostrava, Czech Republic, the team finished fourteenth.
