= 2009 Women's World Floorball Championships =

Floorball competition

A-Division Finals

Tournament details
- Host country: Sweden
- Venues: 2 (in 1 host city)
- Dates: 5–12 December 2009
- Teams: 10

Final positions
- Champions: Sweden
- Runners-up: Switzerland
- Third place: Finland

Tournament statistics
- Matches played: 27
- Goals scored: 283 (10.48 per match)
- Attendance: 19,040 (705 per match)
- Scoring leader(s): (Sweden) Emelie Lindström

Awards
- MVP: (Sweden) Hermine Dahlerus

The 2009 Women's World Floorball Championships were the seventh edition of Women's World Floorball Championship. The tournament was held from December 5 to 12, 2009 in Västerås, Sweden. Matches took place in the Bombardier Arena and ABB Arena Nord.

Sweden won the tournament for the second consecutive time and the fourth time overall, defeating Switzerland in the final game. Finland defeated the Czech Republic in the bronze medal game. This marked the first time the Czech women's team reached the medal games of the World Championships.

For the first time, the tournament was held in December. It was also the first women's championship preceded by a qualification round, although only in Europe. Conversely, it was the last time the competition included a B-Division.

== Preliminary round ==
=== Group A ===
Team	Pld	W	D	L	GF	GA	GD	Pts
Sweden	4	4	0	0	61	6	+55	8
Czech Republic	4	3	0	1	26	16	+10	6
Latvia	4	1	1	2	21	22	−1	3
Norway	4	1	1	2	23	28	−5	3
United States	4	0	0	4	10	69	−59	0

Source: IFF

December 5, 2009; 13:30	Sweden	17–3	Norway	Västerås, Sweden; Bombardier Arena

December 5, 2009; 20:00	Czech Republic	12–3	United States	Västerås, Sweden; Bombardier Arena

December 6, 2009; 16:30	United States	1–28	Sweden	Västerås, Sweden; Bombardier Arena

December 6, 2009; 19:15	Latvia	5–7	Czech Republic	Västerås, Sweden; Bombardier Arena

December 7, 2009; 16:30	Norway	2–2	Latvia	Västerås, Sweden; Bombardier Arena

December 7, 2009; 19:15	Czech Republic	1–6	Sweden	Västerås, Sweden; Bombardier Arena

December 8, 2009; 11:00	Latvia	13–3	United States	Västerås, Sweden; Bombardier Arena

December 8, 2009; 16:30	Norway	2–6	Czech Republic	Västerås, Sweden; Bombardier Arena

December 9, 2009; 16:30	United States	3–16	Norway	Västerås, Sweden; Bombardier Arena

December 9, 2009; 19:15	Sweden	10–1	Latvia	Västerås, Sweden; Bombardier Arena

=== Group B ===
Team	Pld	W	D	L	GF	GA	GD	Pts
Switzerland	4	4	0	0	37	7	+30	8
Finland	4	3	0	1	22	10	+12	6
Russia	4	2	0	2	12	18	−6	4
Poland	4	1	0	3	10	20	−10	2
Denmark	4	0	0	4	9	35	−26	0

Source: IFF

December 5, 2009; 11:00	Switzerland	9–1	Poland	Västerås, Sweden; Bombardier Arena

December 5, 2009; 13:45	Russia	1–7	Finland	Västerås, Sweden; Bombardier Arena

December 6, 2009; 11:00	Denmark	3–15	Switzerland	Västerås, Sweden; Bombardier Arena

December 6, 2009; 13:45	Poland	1–2	Russia	Västerås, Sweden; Bombardier Arena

December 7, 2009; 11:00	Finland	6–1	Denmark	Västerås, Sweden; Bombardier Arena

December 7, 2009; 13:45	Switzerland	8–0	Russia	Västerås, Sweden; Bombardier Arena

December 8, 2009; 13:45	Denmark	3–5	Poland	Västerås, Sweden; Bombardier Arena

December 8, 2009; 19:15	Finland	3–5	Switzerland	Västerås, Sweden; Bombardier Arena

December 9, 2009; 11:00	Russia	9–2	Denmark	Västerås, Sweden; Bombardier Arena

December 9, 2009; 13:45	Poland	3–6	Finland	Västerås, Sweden; Bombardier Arena

== Playoffs ==
Semifinals
A1	Sweden	10
B2	Finland	2
B1	Switzerland	5
A2	Czech Republic	1

Finals
A1	Sweden	6
B1	Switzerland	2
Third place
B2	Finland	3
A2	Czech Republic	1

=== Semifinals ===
December 11, 2009; 15:15	Switzerland	5–1	Czech Republic	Västerås, Sweden; ABB Arena Nord

Game reference

May 18, 2007; 18:15	Sweden	10–2	Finland	Västerås, Sweden; ABB Arena Nord

Game reference

=== Bronze medal match ===
December 12, 2009; 12:00	Czech Republic	1–3	Finland	Västerås, Sweden; ABB Arena Nord

Game reference

=== World championship match ===
December 12, 2009; 15:02	Switzerland	2–6	Sweden	Västerås, Sweden; ABB Arena Nord

Game reference
1:3 Andrea Hofstetter - 24.07; 2:5 Corin Rüttimann - 36.45 / Goals / 0:1 Karolina Widar - 13.43; 0:2 Susanna Tuominen - 20.38; 0:3 Emelie Lindström - 23.52; 1:4 Malin Dalbjer - 25.45; 1:5 Hermine Dahlerus - 25.59; 2:6 Victoria Wikström - 48.44

== Placement round ==
=== 9th place match ===
December 10, 2009; 19:00	United States	2–3	Denmark	Västerås, Sweden; Bombardier Arena

Game reference

=== 7th place match ===
December 10, 2009; 20:00	Poland	5–6 (PS)	Norway	Västerås, Sweden; Bombardier Arena

Game reference

=== 5th place match ===
December 10, 2009; 11:00	Latvia	3–4 (OT)	Russia	Västerås, Sweden; Bombardier Arena

Game reference

== Leading scorers ==
Player		GP	G	A	PTS	PIM
(Sweden)	Emelie Lindström	6	9	16	25	2
(Sweden)	Victoria Wikström	6	9	8	17	0
(Sweden)	Sara Kristoffersson	6	8	8	16	0
(Sweden)	Karolina Widar	6	10	5	15	2
(Sweden)	Hermine Dahlerus	6	8	4	12	0
(Switzerland)	Natalie Stadelmann	6	5	6	11	0
(Switzerland)	Corin Rüttimann	6	9	1	10	0
(Norway)	Line Nygård	5	6	2	8	0
(Switzerland)	Mirca Anderegg	6	3	5	8	0
(Switzerland)	Simone Berner	6	2	6	8	2

== All-Star team ==
- Goalkeeper: (Switzerland) Laura Tomatis
- Defense: (Switzerland) Simone Berner, (Sweden) Lisah Samuelsson
- Forward: (Sweden) Emelie Lindström, (Sweden) Karolina Widar, (Sweden) Sara Kristoffersson

== Ranking ==
2009 Women's World Floorball Championship winners Sweden; 4th World title

Official rankings according to the IFF

Rk.	Team
1st place, gold medalist(s)	Sweden
2nd place, silver medalist(s)	Switzerland
3rd place, bronze medalist(s)	Finland
4	Czech Republic
5	Russia
6	Latvia
7	Norway
8	Poland
9	Denmark
10	United States
