= Eliška Krupnová =

Czech floorball player

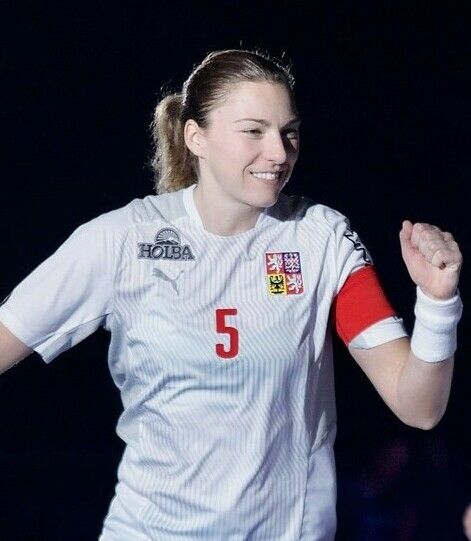
- Krupnová at Euro Floorball Tour in 2022

Personal information
- National team: Czech Republic
- Born: 23 June 1993 (age 33) Czech Republic

Sport
- Sport: Floorball
- League: Czech Women's Extraliga (2009–2015); Swedish Super League (2015–2024)
- Team: Herbadent Tigers SJM (2009–2015); Pixbo IBK (2015–2024)
Medal record
Women's floorball
Representing Czech Republic
World Championships
Bronze medal – third place	2011 Switzerland
Bronze medal – third place	2023 Singapore
Under-19 World Championships
Bronze medal – third place	2010 Czech Republic

Eliška Krupnová (born 23 June 1993) is a former Czech floorball forward, captain of the Czech national team and its all-time leading scorer. She is a two-time bronze medalist at the World Championships, a four-time Czech champion, and the only Czech player to have won the Swedish championship.

In December 2020, she became the first and only Czech player in history to be named the world's best floorball player. She has won the award for best Czech floorball player a record eight times. She competed in the top floorball leagues in the Czech Republic and Sweden from 2009 to 2024.

== Club career ==
Krupnová began playing floorball in youth teams in Mariánské Lázně, where she played until 2010. Starting in the 2009–10 season, she joined the Women's Extraliga team Herbadent Tigers SJM on loan, transferring to the club permanently the following year. In addition to playing in the women's category, she also competed in the club's youth teams during her early years there. In her first four seasons with Herbadent, she won four Czech championship titles with the team. In the following two seasons, she added two runner-up finishes, and between 2009 and 2013 she also won five Czech Floorball Cup titles.

In 2015, she transferred to the Swedish club Pixbo IBK, where she later became team captain. In the 2015–16 season, she won the Swedish league title with Pixbo, becoming the only Czech player to do so. She was named most valuable player of the championship Superfinal. She also won gold at the subsequent Champions Cup — as the only Czech player in foreign team with full participation — and was selected to the tournament's All-Star Team. During four seasons between 2020 and 2024, they finished as league runner-ups four times, each time losing to Team Thorengruppen. In the 2021–22 season, Krupnová scored a hat-trick in the deciding semifinal match to help Pixbo reach the Superfinal. In 2023, she contributed one goal and two assists to secure victory in the Swedish Cup final. In 2023, she won a record ninth Czech Open gold medal with Pixbo. In 2024 she ended her top-level career. In the autumn seasons of 2024 and 2025, she won the Singapore league twice with the team Wondersticks.

== International career ==
Krupnová represented the Czech Republic at the 2010 U-19 World Championship, where the Czech team won bronze — the first medal in the history of Czech women's floorball — and again at the 2012 edition of the tournament.

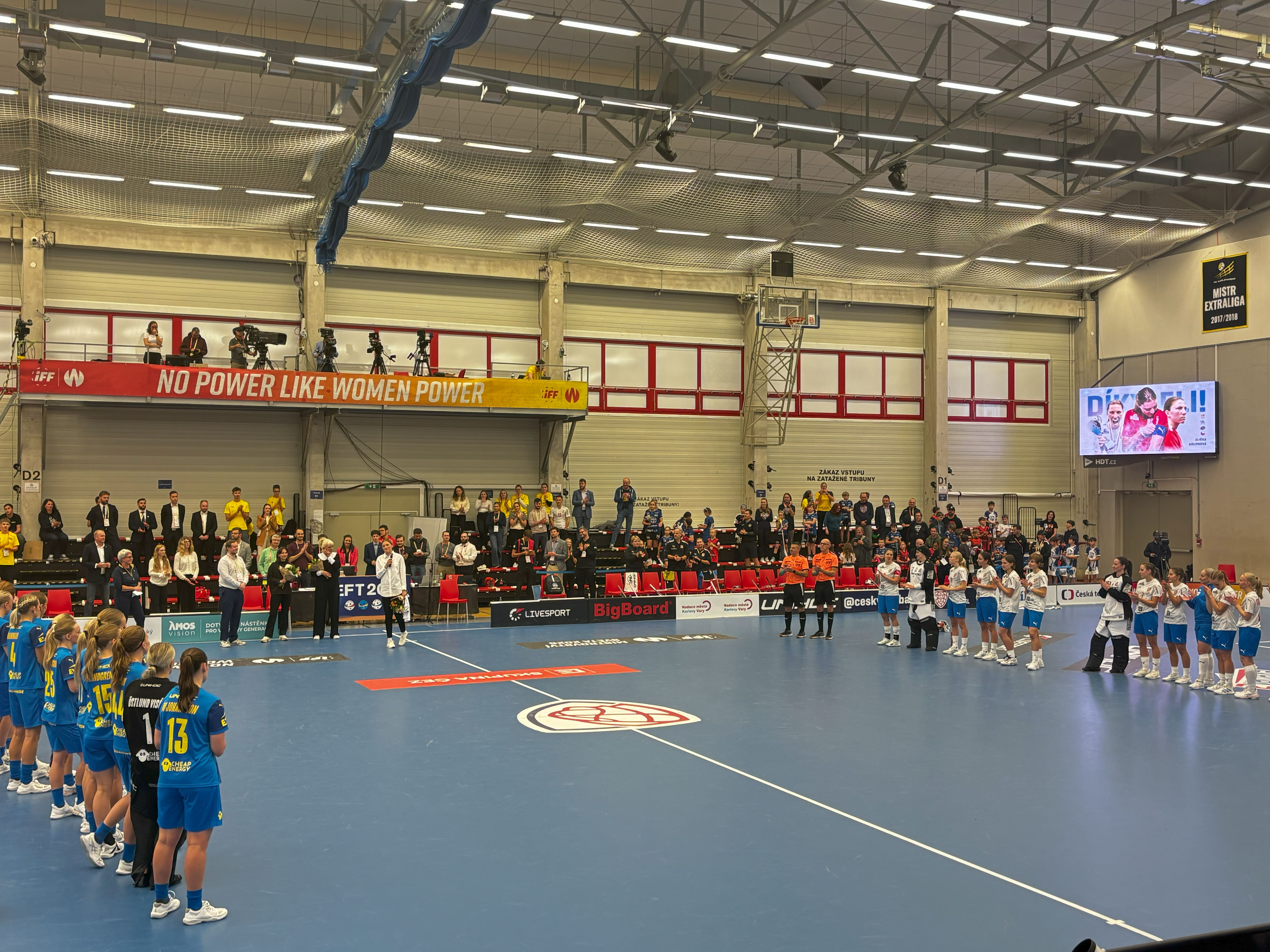
Farewell ceremony for Eliška Krupnová (in the back on the center line) at the Euro Floorball Tour in November 2024 in Karlovy Vary

With the senior national team, she first competed at the Euro Floorball Tour (EFT) in November 2010, followed by the 2011 World Championship, where she won a bronze medal — the first medal for the Czech women's national team at the senior level. She went on to play in six more World Championships between 2013 and 2023. With seven appearances in total, she ranks among the Czech players with the highest number of participations. At the 2017 World Championship, she was the most productive Czech player. In addition to the World Championships and qualification tournaments, she regularly represented the national team in friendly matches and EFT events. At the 2013 Polish Cup, she defeated Finland with the Czech team for the first time in history. At the 2014 EFT, she scored a goal in the Czech Republic's third-ever victory over Finland, helping secure the team's first silver medal at the tournament. In 2016, she also competed at the World University Floorball Championship in Portugal, where the Czech team won bronze medals.

From the 2019 World Championship until the end of her career, she served as captain of the national team, and in September 2020 she became the all-time leading scorer in the history of the Czech women's national team. In September 2023, at the EFT, she led the Czech team to its first-ever victory over Sweden and to its second silver medal at the tournament. At the World Championship later that year, she won another bronze medal, contributing a goal in the third-place match. Together with goalkeeper Jana Christianová, they are the only two players to have won both of the first Czech women's national team's World Championship bronze medals.

In 2021, she broke Tereza Urbánková's Czech historic record of 22 goals scored at the World Championships. At the 2023 World Championship, she surpassed Hana Koníčková's national team record of 135 international appearances. At the time of her retirement, Krupnová held Czech national team records with 141 matches played, 176 points, 107 goals, and 69 assists. In 2025, her appearance record was surpassed by goalkeeper Jana Christianová.

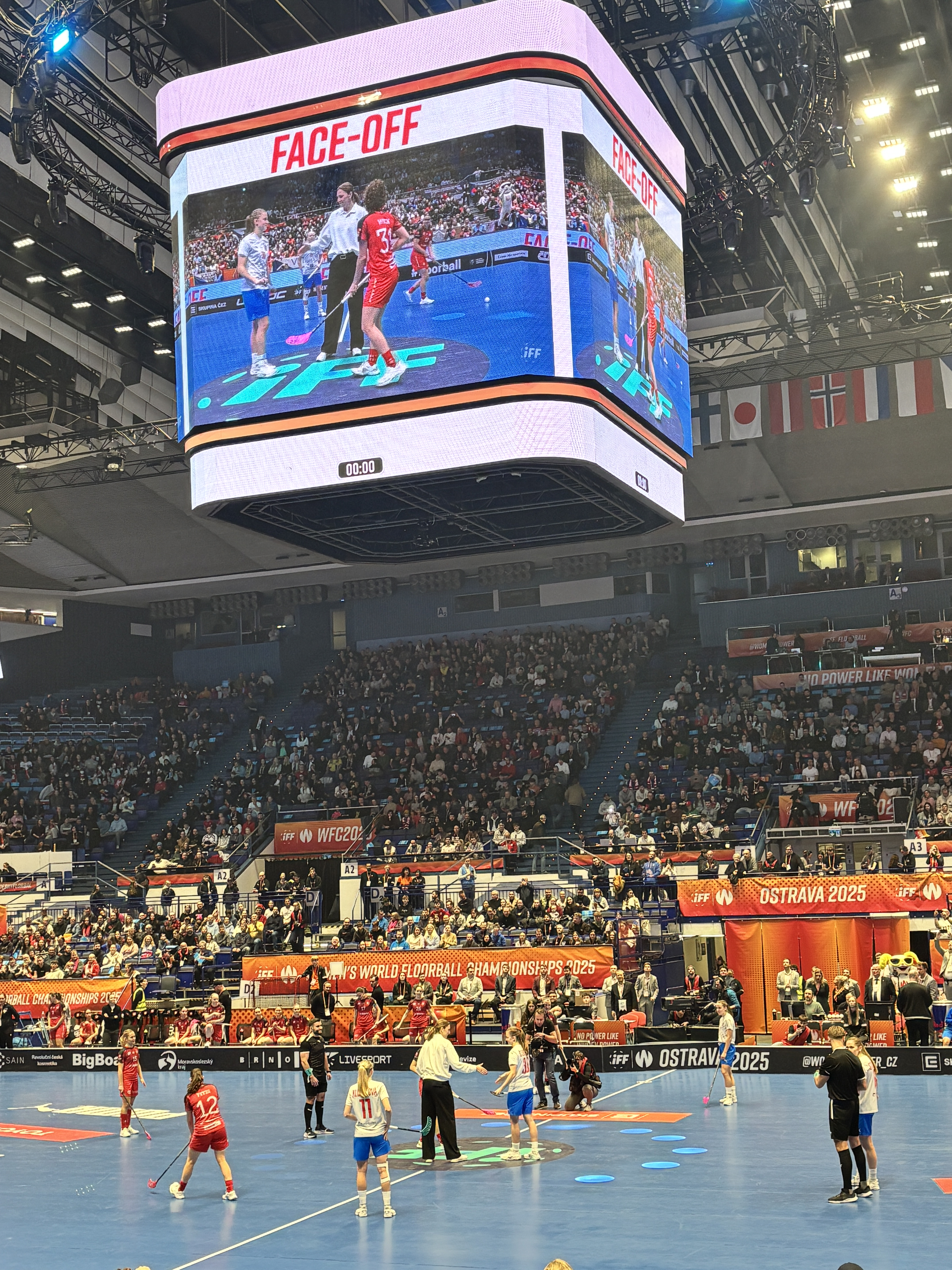
Krupnová (center, in white and black) at the opening ceremony of the 2025 World Championship final

Krupnová's official farewell ceremony took place during EFT in Karlovy Vary in November 2024.

Year	Team	Event	Result
2010	Czech U-19	WFC U-19	3rd place, bronze medalist(s)
2011	Czech	WFC	3rd place, bronze medalist(s)
2012	Czech U-19	WFC U-19	4th
2013	Czech	WFC	4th
2015	Czech	WFC	4th
2017	Czech	WFC	4th
2019	Czech	WFC	4th
2021	Czech	WFC	4th
2023	Czech	WFC	3rd place, bronze medalist(s)

== Awards ==
In 2020, Krupnová was named the world's best floorball player in a poll conducted by Innebandymagazinet magazine as the first and only Czech player in history. Between 2016 and 2023 she was ranked among the top 10 players a total of five times, a Czech women's record.
