= 2021 Women's World Floorball Championships =

Floorball competition

Tournament details
- Host country: Sweden
- Venue: 1 (in 1 host city)
- Dates: 27 November – 5 December
- Teams: 16

Final positions
- Champions: Sweden (10th title)
- Runners-up: Finland
- Third place: Switzerland

Tournament statistics
- Matches played: 48
- Attendance: 21,177 (441 per match)
- Scoring leader(s): (Finland) Veera Kauppi (20 points)

Awards
- MVP: (Finland) Veera Kauppi

The 2021 Women's World Floorball Championships was the 13th edition of Women's World Floorball Championship. The tournament was held from 27 November to 5 December 2021 in Uppsala, Sweden. It was the third time Sweden hosted the Women's World Championship.

The tournament was originally scheduled to take place a week later, but was moved to minimize the overlap with the postponed Men's World Championship.

Sweden won for the eighth consecutive time and the tenth time overall.

== Qualification ==
Host Qualified Did not qualify

	Date	Venue	Vacancies	Qualified
Host nation			1	Sweden
European Qualification 1	15–19 June 2021 (Cancelled)	(Latvia) Valmiera	11	Finland; Latvia; Norway; Russia
European Qualification 2	25–29 May 2021 (Cancelled)	(Italy) Lignano Sabbiadoro	11	Germany; Poland; Switzerland
European Qualification 3	26–30 May 2021 (Cancelled)	(Slovakia) Bratislava	11	Czech Republic; Denmark; Estonia; Slovakia
Americas Qualification	11–12 June 2021 (Cancelled)	(Canada) Guelph	1	United States
Asia-Oceania Qualification	29 June – 3 July 2021 (Cancelled)	(Japan) Hachiōji	3	~~Australia~~; ~~Japan~~; Singapore
Wild Card/Replacements			2	Italy; Thailand
Total			16	

== Venues ==
Uppsala
IFU Arena

== Draw ==
The draw took place on 22 May 2021 in Uppsala, Sweden.

Pot 1	Pot 2	Pot 3	Pot 4
Sweden (1); Switzerland (2); Finland (3); Czech Republic (4)	Slovakia (5); Poland (6); Latvia (7); Germany (8)	Norway (9); Denmark (10); Estonia (11); Italy (12)	Thailand (13); Singapore (14); United States (16); NFFR (17)(*)

(*) Russia is not allowed to use its flag, coat of arms or national anthem during the tournament.

== Preliminary round ==
=== Group A ===
Pos	Team	Pld	W	D	L	GF	GA	GD	Pts	Qualification
1	Czech Republic	3	3	0	0	19	4	+15	6	Quarterfinals
2	Switzerland	3	2	0	1	21	7	+14	4	Quarterfinals
3	Poland	3	1	0	2	10	16	−6	2	Play-off round
4	Latvia	3	0	0	3	4	27	−23	0	Play-off round

Source: IFF

27 November 2021; 19:30	Czech Republic	5–2 (1–1, 1–0, 3–1)	Switzerland	IFU Arena A Attendance: 245

Game reference
Karolina Sucha 09:41; Michaela Mlejnková 38:40; Pavlina Bacova 42:32; Eliška Krupnová 51:37; Vendula Berankova 59:31 / Goals / 06:38 Julia Suter; 41:14 Michelle Wiki; 53:24 Isabelle Gerig

28 November 2021; 10:00	Poland	6–4 (3–1, 2–1, 1–2)	Latvia	IFU Arena A Attendance: 88

Game reference
Maja Helman 04:51; Malwina Zagorska 05:00; Zuzanna Krzywak 13:54; Karolina Rozmus 24:00; Karolina Rozmus 29:46; Zuzanna Krzywak 48:58 / Goals / 05:26 Eliza Elizabete Berzina; 28:43 Anna Ankudinova; 50:59 Eliza Elizabete Berzina; 59:50 Anna Anukdinova

29 November 2021; 16:00	Switzerland	13–0 (4–0, 3–0, 6–0)	Latvia	IFU Arena A Attendance: 45

Game reference
Corin Rüttimann 02:35 (42:37); Michelle Wiki 08:56; Chiara Gredig 14:25; Nathalie Spichiger 18:48; Michelle Wiki 27:02; Lea Hanimann 30:55; Julia Suter 35:34; Isabelle Gerig 41:11; Anja Wyss 41:54; Flurina Marti 49:47 (52:29), 56:09 / Goals

29 November 2021; 19:00	Czech Republic	6–2 (2-0, 1-2, 3-0)	Poland	IFU Arena A Attendance: 105

Game reference
Michalea Kubecova 11:57; Eliška Krupnová 12:18; Michaela Mlejnková 39:06 (58:30); Magdalena Plaskova 42:08; Denisa Kotzurova 46:21 / Goals / 28:48 (34:27) Zuzanna Krzywak

30 November 2021; 13:00	Latvia	0–8 (0–4, 0–2, 0–2)	Czech Republic	IFU Arena A Attendance: 123

Game reference
Goals / 04:08 Eliksa Chuda; 05:46 Martina Repkova; 14:46 Magdalena Plaskova

30 November 2021; 19:45	Switzerland	6–2 (3–1, 1–1, 2–0)	Poland	IFU Arena A Attendance: 307

Game reference
Corin Rüttimann 03:15; Nathalie Spichiger 07:12; Michelle Wiki 11:11 (39:23), 41:47; Flurina Marti 43:12 / Goals / 03:33 (22:55) Malwina Zagoska

=== Group B ===
Pos	Team	Pld	W	D	L	GF	GA	GD	Pts	Qualification
1	Sweden (H)	3	3	0	0	51	6	+45	6	Quarterfinals
2	Finland	3	2	0	1	25	11	+14	4	Quarterfinals
3	Slovakia	3	1	0	2	11	29	−18	2	Play-off round
4	Germany	3	0	0	3	0	41	−41	0	Play-off round

Source: IFF
(H) Hosts

27 November 2021; 17:00	Sweden	22–3 (8–1, 6–1, 8–1)	Slovakia	IFU Arena A Attendance: 1,123

Game reference
Ellen Rasmussen 02:26; Ellen Backstedt 02:39; Ida Sundberg 05:38; Emeile Wibron 06:17 (55:08); Klara Molin 07:59; Sofia Joelsson 11:19; Ellen Backstedt 12:50; Emelie Wibron 24:18 (55.08); Klara Molin 25:35 (56:29); Sofia Joelsson 29:37; Moa Tschop 30:49; Cajsa Elm 34:38; Klara Loneberg 37:24; Cajsa Elm 41:42; Sofia Joelsson 43:45 (47:29); Moa Gustafsson 51:47; Wilma Johannson 59:07; Amanda Delgado 59:34 / Goals / 17:38 Paulina Hudakova; 21:41 No Player; 59:53 Denisa Ferencikova

27 November 2021; 19:00	Germany	0–15 (0–4, 0–6, 0–5)	Finland	IFU Arena B Attendance: 149

Game reference
Goals / 03:34 Sara Piispa; 10:39 Laura Rantanen; 11:41 Inka Lampinen; 12:02 Meri-Helmi Hoynala; 20:17 Oona Kauppi; 20:34 (54:31) Sofia Leino; 23:19 Elli Kylmaluoma; 33:09 No Player; 33:39 (35:19) Veera Kauppi; 40:28 My Kippila; 40:48 Sanni Nieminen; 46:53 Veera Kauppi

28 November 2021; 15:30	Sweden	20–0 (11–0, 7–0, 2–0)	Germany	IFU Arena A Attendance: 814

Game reference
Ellen Backstedt 00:30; Moa Andersson 02:48; Moa Gustafsson 03:46; Klara Loneberg 04:30; Ellen Rasmussen 05:20; Moa Anderson 06:52; Emelie Wibron 10:13; Wilma Johansson 11:30; Cajsa Elm 16:23 / Goals

28 November 2021; 18:15	Slovakia	2–7 (1–2, 0–3, 1–2)	Finland	IFU Arena A Attendance: 118

Game reference
Paulina Hudkova 17:55 / Goals / 15:53 My Kippila; 19:23 (20:40) Veera Kauppi; 29:08 Daniela Westerlund; 36:34 Laura Rantanen; 52:17 Veera Kauppi

29 November 2021; 13:00	Slovakia	6–0 (3–0, 3–0, 0–0)	Germany	IFU Arena A Attendance: 26

Game reference
Klara Grossova 01:59 / Goals

30 November 2021; 17:05	Finland	3–9 (0–3, 1–4, 2–2)	Sweden	IFU Arena A Attendance: 2,209

Game reference
Veera Kauppi 34:21; Hanna Niemela 41:43; Johanna Homi 47:56 / Goals / Ellen Backstedt 04:29; Moa Gustafsson 05:03; Klara Loneberg 16:36; Moa Tschop 23:14; Amanda Delgado Johansson 23:35; Ellen Rasmussen 24:59; Maja Viström 32:20; Wilma Johansson 38:50; Wilma Johansson 50:01; Cajsa Elm 55:35
2 min	Penalties	4 min

=== Group C ===
Pos	Team	Pld	W	D	L	GF	GA	GD	Pts	Qualification
1	Denmark	3	3	0	0	33	7	+26	6	Play-off round
2	United States	3	2	0	1	30	15	+15	4	Play-off round
3	Thailand	3	1	0	2	12	19	−7	2	13–16 place semifinals
4	Italy	3	0	0	3	2	36	−34	0	13–16 place semifinals

Source: IFF

27 November 2021; 14:00	United States	6–9 (1–3, 1–2, 4–4)	Denmark	IFU Arena A Attendance: 340

Game reference
Michelle Linart 12:10; Suzanne Lindquist 28:40; Selma Johansson 43:45; Kimberly Campbell 44:50; Michelle Linart 54:50 (55:21) / Goals / 10:08 Emma Vistisen; 11:49 Klara Fjorder; 16:07 Sara Mainz Olsson; 35:21 (58:56) Frida Mainz Olsson; 37:13 Sara Mainz Olsson; 41:33 (48:01), 50:08 Mathilde Christensen

28 November 2021; 12:00	Italy	2–5 (0–3, 1–1, 1–1)	Thailand	IFU Arena B Attendance: 190

Game reference
Livia Dossegger 37:48; Alina-Oliva Baioni 45:43 / Goals / 07:34 Nelly Johansson; 08:36 Nelly Johansson; 17:31 Kamonwan Phumma; 29.03' Lalita Kuiraphaanew

29 November 2021; 12:00	United States	16–0 (7–0, 4–0, 5–0)	Italy	IFU Arena B Attendance: 185

Game reference
Selma Johansson 03:49 (10:30); Jenna Hausman 04:19; Michelle Linart 05:53 (06:38); Kajsa Krohn 12:03 (13:43), 24:57; Maggie Haggstorm 25:31; Adelia Pennisi 38:16 / Goals

29 November 2021; 15:00	Denmark	9–1 (3–1, 3–0, 3–0)	Thailand	IFU Arena B Attendance: 175

Game reference
Anna Kajsa Habersatter 05:48; Klara Fjorder 06:19; Nanna Moller Sorensen 14:25; Klara Fjorder 25:27 / Goals / 10:05 Nina Suppa

30 November 2021; 12:00	Thailand	6–8 (0–5, 4–0, 1–3)	United States	IFU Arena B Attendance: 597

Game reference
Goals / 01:32 Victoria Olivas; 02:01 Kimberly Campbell; 08:43 (19:04) Michelle Linart

30 November 2021; 15:00	Denmark	15–0 (8–0, 4–0, 3–0)	Italy	IFU Arena B Attendance: 253

Game reference
Cecilia Di Nardo 00:44 / Goals

=== Group D ===
Pos	Team	Pld	W	D	L	GF	GA	GD	Pts	Qualification
1	Norway	3	3	0	0	22	6	+16	6	Play-off round
2	NFFR	3	1	1	1	14	14	0	3	Play-off round
3	Estonia	3	1	0	2	7	20	−13	2	13–16 place semifinals
4	Singapore	3	0	1	2	10	13	−3	1	13–16 place semifinals

Source: IFF

27 November 2021; 12:00	Singapore	3–4 (0–2, 2–0, 1–2)	Estonia	IFU Arena B Attendance: 121

Game reference
Ying Rui Ong 29:40; Jerelee Ong 38:29 / Goals / 16:44 Kati Kutisar; 18:39 Kirke Pollisinski; 51:44 Kadi Keinast; 53:45 Edith Parnik

27 November 2021; 15:00	NFFR	3–7 (2–1, 0–2, 1–4)	Norway	IFU Arena B Attendance: 323

Game reference
Mariia Kitaeva 12:21 (18:13) / Goals / 09:07 (42:06) Rikke Ingebrigtsli Hansen; 21:57 (46:57) Julie Gidske; 35:46 Karen Farnes; 40:34 Julianne Tempelen Bakka; 44:51 Tone Einstulen

28 November 2021; 12:45	Estonia	1–11 (1–2, 0–3, 0–6)	Norway	IFU Arena A Attendance: 123

Game reference
Kirke Pollisinski 17:43 / Goals / 04:29 (22:46) Kine Hedlund Eriksen; 09:36 Julie Gidske; 22:46 Kine Hedlund Eriksen; 31:56 (40:31) Rikke Ingebrigtsli Hansen

28 November 2021; 15:00	Singapore	5–5 (1–2, 3–1, 1–2)	NFFR	IFU Arena B Attendance: 93

Game reference
Ying Rui Ong 11:54; Angela Model 29:56 / Goals / 05:26 Elizaveta Nadeeva; 07:37 Mariia Basargina

29 November 2021; 18:00	Norway	4–2 (1–0, 0–0, 3–2)	Singapore	IFU Arena B Attendance: 105

Game reference

30 November 2021; 18:00	Estonia	3–6 (1–1, 0–3, 2–2)	NFFR	IFU Arena B Attendance: 283

Game reference

== Knockout stage ==
=== Bracket ===
Play-off; 1 December
Latvia	6
Norway	9
Slovakia	20
United States	0
Germany	4
Denmark	5
Poland	7
NFFR	3

Quarterfinals; 2–3 December
Sweden	13
Norway	0
Switzerland	12
Slovakia	1
Czech Republic	7
Denmark	5
Finland	14
Poland	0

Semifinals; 4 December
Sweden	14
Switzerland	1
Czech Republic	4
Finland	5

Final; 5 December
Sweden	4
Finland	3
Third place
Switzerland	5
Czech Republic	2

=== Play-off round ===
1 December 2021; 10:00	Latvia	6–9 (1–5, 2–3, 3–1)	Norway	IFU Arena A Attendance: 197

Game reference
Anna Ankudinova 00:25; Marta Liba Zameca 23:23 / Goals / 07:12 (14:25), 22:12 Karen Farnes; 07:38 (21:44) Emma Lunde; 16:27 Sofie Kristiansen; 19:13 Julie Gidske

1 December 2021; 13:00	Germany	4–5 PSO (1–0, 1–1, 2–3); OT: 0–0; PSO: 1–2	Denmark	IFU Arena A Attendance: 278

Game reference
Kisa Reck 05:57; Katharina Meyer 36:17 / Goals / 27:28 Mathilde Christensen; 43:30 Klara Fjorder

1 December 2021; 16:00	Slovakia	20–0 (4–0, 6–0, 10–0)	United States	IFU Arena A Attendance: 107

Game reference
Klara Grossova 00:26 / Goals

1 December 2021; 19:00	Poland	7–3 (0–2, 2–1, 5–0)	NFFR	IFU Arena A Attendance: 102

Game reference
Maja Helman 30:04 (57:51); Justina Krzywak 36:09; Malwina Zargoska 42:47 / Goals / 05:50 Anastasiia Bulbash

=== Quarterfinals ===
2 December 2021; 15:15	Finland	14–0 (8–0, 1–0, 5–0)	Poland	IFU Arena A Attendance: 178

Game reference
Veera Kauppi 00:42; Sanni Nieminen 01:20; Jenna Saario 01:30; Laura Rantanen 03:19; Oona Kauppi 03:40; Hanna Niemela 06:55; Elli Kylmaluoma 11:56; Ella Sundstorm 56:02 / Goals

2 December 2021; 18:00	Sweden	13–0 (3–0, 8–0, 2–0)	Norway	IFU Arena A Attendance: 1,812

Game reference
Moa Gustafsson 02:39; Ella Rasmussen 07:34; Maja Viström 14:47; Klara Molin 28:20; Klara Loneberg 29:59; Sandra Boric Svard 30:59 / Goals

3 December 2021; 16:00	Czech Republic	7–5 (2–2, 4–3, 1–0)	Denmark	IFU Arena A Attendance: 296

Game reference
Denisa Rajatova 14:49; Elksa Chuda 16:03; Elisa Trojankova 22:13; Vendula Berankova 29:27; Michaela Kubeckova 30:44 / Goals / 08.21' Sara Mainz Olsson; 19:13 Anna Kajsa Habersatter; 24:01 Laura de Fries

3 December 2021; 19:00	Switzerland	12–1 (3–0, 5–1, 4–0)	Slovakia	IFU Arena A Attendance: 314

Game reference
Nathalie Spichiger 07:53; Michelle Wiki 09:14; Corin Rüttimann 14:44 (23:03) / Goals / 28:16 Laura Chupekova

=== Semifinals ===
4 December 2021; 15:45	Sweden	14–1 (4–0, 6–0, 4–1)	Switzerland	IFU Arena A Attendance: 2,351

Game reference
Moa Gustafsson 10:48; Moa Tschop 13:50 / Goals / 43:00 Isabelle Gerig

4 December 2021; 19:55	Czech Republic	4–5 (3–2, 0–1, 1–2)	Finland	IFU Arena A Attendance: 1,588

Game reference
Oona Kauppi 00:54 / Goals / 01:12 Karolina Sucha

=== Bronze-medal game ===
5 December 2021; 13:00	Czech Republic	2–5 (0–2, 2–2, 0–1)	Switzerland	IFU Arena A Attendance: 1,847

Game reference
Michaela Kubeckova 23:00 / Goals / 08:08 (09:50) Corin Rüttimann; 35:04 Isabelle Gerig

=== Final ===
5 December 2021; 16:30	Finland	3–4 (1–3, 1–0, 1–0); OT: 0–1	Sweden	IFU Arena A Attendance: 2,587

Game reference
Veera Kauppi 03:40 / Goals / 01:26 Ellen Backstedt; 10:49 Wilma Johansson; 15:20 Ellen Rasmussen

== Placement round ==
=== 13th place bracket ===
13–16th-place semifinals
1 December
Estonia	16
Italy	0
1 December
Thailand	1
Singapore	2

13th-place game
2 December
Estonia	2
Singapore	1
15th-place game
2 December
Italy	5
Thailand	10

=== 13–16th place semifinals ===
1 December 2021; 12:00	Estonia	16–0 (5–0, 4–0, 7–0)	Italy	IFU Arena B Attendance: 77

Game reference
Diana Klavan 10:47; Kirke Pollisinski 11:05 / Goals

1 December 2021; 15:00	Thailand	1–2 (0–1, 1–0, 0–0); OT: 0–1	Singapore	IFU Arena B Attendance: 207

Game reference
Yun Shawn Yee 07:00 / Goals / 24:03 Alisa Syrjaenen

=== 15th place game ===
2 December 2021; 9:15	Italy	5–10 (2–3, 2–5, 1–2)	Thailand	IFU Arena A Attendance: 54

Game reference
Giulia Dieni 02:17 / Goals / 04:46 Nina Suppa; 08:13 Sirinan Boonbut

=== 13th place game ===
2 December 2021; 12:15	Estonia	2–1 (1–1, 0–0, 1–0)	Singapore	IFU Arena A Attendance: 45

Game reference

=== 9th place bracket ===
9–12th-place semifinals
2 December
United States	0
Latvia	13
2 December
NFFR	2
Germany	3

9th-place game
3 December
Latvia	7
Germany	5
11th-place game
3 December
United States	2
NFFR	17

=== 9–12th place semifinals ===
2 December 2021; 12:00	United States	0–13 (0–4, 0–5, 0–4)	Latvia	IFU Arena B Attendance: 93

Game reference
Goals / 06:37 Zane Ziedone; 07:31 Liliana Jakovicka

2 December 2021; 15:00	NFFR	2–3 (0–1, 1–0, 1–1); OT: 0–1	Germany	IFU Arena B Attendance: 147

Game reference
Goals / 08:50 Theresa Beepler-Alt; 38:06 Kisa Reck; 46:45 Winona Jurgens; 61:33 Luisa Diesner

=== 11th place game ===
3 December 2021; 10:00	United States	2–17 (0–6, 0–5, 2–6)	NFFR	IFU Arena A Attendance: 47

Game reference
Goals / 01:06 Kseniia Makkoveeva

=== 9th-place game ===
3 December 2021; 13:00	Latvia	7–5 (1–1, 2–2, 4–2)	Germany	IFU Arena A Attendance: 104

Game reference
Simona Grapena 16:34 / Goals / 17:16 Julia Diesner

=== 5th place bracket ===
5−8th-place semifinals
4 December
Norway	4
Slovakia	5
4 December
Denmark	4
Poland	7

5th-place game
5 December
Slovakia	3
Poland	4
7th-place game
5 December
Norway	3
Denmark	2

=== 5–8th place games ===
4 December 2021; 11:30	Norway	4–5 (1–2, 2–2, 1–1)	Slovakia	IFU Arena B Attendance: 115

Game reference
Rikke Ingebrigtsil Hansen 00:15 / Goals / 03:31 Michaela Sponiarova

4 December 2021; 12:00	Denmark	4–7 (3–2, 0–5, 1–0)	Poland	IFU Arena A Attendance: 223

Game reference

=== 7th place game ===
5 December 2021; 10:30	Denmark	2–3 (0–0, 1–1, 1–1); OT: 0–1	Norway	IFU Arena A Attendance: 194

Game reference
Mathilde Chiristensen 36:31 / Goals / 31:07 Sofie Kristiansen

=== 5th place game ===
5 December 2021; 10:00	Poland	4–3 (0–1, 3–2, 1–0)	Slovakia	IFU Arena B Attendance: 74

Game reference
Zuzanna Krzywak 21:34 / Goals / 18:15 Klara Grossova

== Team of the tournament ==
Tournament all-star team:

- Best goalkeeper: (Czech Republic) Jana Christianová
- Best defenders: (Sweden) Moa Tschöp, (Sweden) Ida Sundberg
- Best forwards: (Sweden) Wilma Johansson, (Sweden) Ellen Rasmussen, (Finland) Veera Kauppi
- Most valuable player: (Finland) Veera Kauppi

== Final ranking ==
1st place, gold medalist(s)	Sweden
2nd place, silver medalist(s)	Finland
3rd place, bronze medalist(s)	Switzerland
4	Czech Republic
5	Poland
6	Slovakia
7	Norway
8	Denmark
9	Latvia
10	Germany
11	NFFR
12	United States
13	Estonia
14	Singapore
15	Thailand
16	Italy
