= Floorball World Championships =

Floorball World Championships may refer to:

- Men's World Floorball Championship
- Women's World Floorball Championship
