= 2005 Women's World Floorball Championships =

Floorball competition

Tournament details
- Host country: Singapore
- Venues: 3 (in 1 host city)
- Dates: May 30–June 5, 2005
- Teams: 8

Final positions
- Champions: Switzerland

Tournament statistics
- Matches played: 18
- Goals scored: 353 (19.61 per match)
- Attendance: 23,054 (1,281 per match)
- Scoring leader(s): (Sweden) Sara Ekström

The 2005 Women's World Floorball Championships was the fifth edition of Women's World Floorball Championship. The tournament took place from May 30 to June 6, 2005 in Singapore. This was the first time the World Floorball Championship was held outside of Europe.

Switzerland won the tournament defeating Finland, 4-3, in the final-game. Until 2025, it was the only Women's World Floorball Championship won by a country other than Sweden or Finland.

== Venues ==
Singapore
Singapore Indoor Stadium; Capacity: 8,000	Ite College East; Capacity: 1,500	Woodlands Sports Hall; Capacity: 500

== Preliminary round ==
=== Group A ===
Pos	Team	Pld	W	D	L	GF	GA	GD	Pts	Qualification
1	Sweden	3	3	0	0	36	3	+33	6	Semifinals
2	Norway	3	2	0	1	25	19	+6	4	Semifinals
3	Russia	3	1	0	2	9	27	−18	2	
4	Japan	3	0	0	3	5	26	−21	0	

Source: IFF

=== Group B ===
Pos	Team	Pld	W	D	L	GF	GA	GD	Pts	Qualification
1	Switzerland	3	3	0	0	16	6	+10	6	Semifinals
2	Finland	3	2	0	1	18	8	+10	4	Semifinals
3	Latvia	3	1	0	2	4	16	−12	2	
4	Czech Republic	3	0	0	3	4	12	−8	0	

Source: IFF

== Knockout stage ==
Semifinals
A1	Sweden	2
B2	Finland	3
B1	Switzerland	5
A2	Norway	1

Finals
Finland	3
Switzerland	4

=== Semifinals ===
June 4, 2005; 13:00	Switzerland	5–1 (1–0, 3–0, 1–1)	Norway	Singapore Indoor Stadium, Singapore

Game reference

June 4, 2005; 16:00	Sweden	1–3 (1–1, 0–1, 0–1)	Finland	Singapore Indoor Stadium, Singapore

Game reference

=== Bronze medal game ===
June 5, 2005; 11:00	Sweden	15–1 (3–0, 5–0, 7–1)	Norway	Singapore Indoor Stadium, Singapore

Game reference

=== Final ===
June 5, 2005; 17:00	Finland	3–4 (1–2, 1–1, 1–1)	Switzerland	Singapore Indoor Stadium, Singapore

Game reference

== Placement round ==
=== 7th-place game ===
June 3, 2005	Japan	0–4	Czech Republic	Singapore

Game reference

=== 5th-place game ===
June 3, 2005	Latvia	10–2	Russia	Singapore

Game reference

== Final ranking ==
1st place, gold medalist(s)	Switzerland
2nd place, silver medalist(s)	Finland
3rd place, bronze medalist(s)	Sweden
4	Norway
5	Latvia
6	Russia
7	Czech Republic
8	Japan
