= 1997 Women's World Floorball Championships =

Floorball competition

Tournament details
- Host country: Finland
- Dates: 3–10 May
- Teams: 10

Final positions
- Champions: Sweden (1st title)
- Runners-up: Finland
- Third place: Norway

Tournament statistics
- Matches played: 27
- Goals scored: 312 (11.56 per match)
- Attendance: 5,433 (201 per match)
- Scoring leader(s): Sara Wiksten (SWE)

Awards
- MVP: Åsa Karlsson (SWE)
- All statistics correct as of 2014-06-25.

The 1997 Women's World Floorball Championships were the first world championship in women's floorball, following the first world championship for men the previous year. The matches of the championship were played in Mariehamn and Godby, Åland, Finland 3–10 May 1997. Sweden won the tournament and became the first world champions in the history of women's floorball.

== Preliminary round ==
The two best placed teams from each group advances to semifinals. The third placed team from each group plays the game for 5th position. The fourth best teams plays the game for 7th position and so on.

=== Group A ===
Team	Pld	W	D	L	GF	GA	GD	Pts
Sweden	4	4	0	0	75	1	+74	8
Switzerland	4	3	0	1	29	13	+16	6
Russia	4	2	0	2	19	24	−5	4
Germany	4	1	0	3	8	39	−31	2
Austria	4	0	0	4	3	57	−54	0

3 May 1997
15:00

Austria

0–32
(0-11, 0-12, 0-9)

Sweden

Mariehamn

3 May 1997
19:00

Germany

1–11
(0-4, 0-4, 1-3)

Switzerland

Mariehamn

4 May 1997
15:00

Russia

7–2
(4-1, 1-1, 2-0)

Austria

Mariehamn

4 May 1997
19:00

Sweden

18–0
(4-0, 2-0, 12-0)

Germany

Mariehamn

5 May 1997
15:00

Germany

5–1
(2-0, 0-1, 3-0)

Austria

Mariehamn

5 May
19:00

Switzerland

4–3
(1-1, 1-2, 2-0)

Russia

Mariehamn

6 May 1997
15:00

Austria

0–13
(0-5, 0-3, 0-5)

Switzerland

Mariehamn

6 May 1997
19:00

Sweden

16–0
(5-0, 8-0, 3-0)

Russia

Mariehamn

7 May 1997
15:00

Russia

9–2
(3-1, 3-1, 3-0)

Germany

Mariehamn

7 May 1997
19:00

Switzerland

1–9
(0-5, 1-0, 0-4)

Sweden

Mariehamn

=== Group B ===
Team	Pld	W	D	L	GF	GA	GD	Pts
Finland	4	4	0	0	49	6	+43	8
Norway	4	3	0	1	35	8	+27	6
Czech Republic	4	2	0	2	30	12	+18	4
Latvia	4	1	0	3	17	23	−6	2
Japan	4	0	0	4	1	83	−82	0

3 May 1997
16:00

Norway

4–3
(1-0, 3-2, 0-1)

Czech Republic

Godbyhallen, Godby

3 May 1997
20:00

Japan

0–30
(0-13, 0-9, 0-8)

Finland

Godbyhallen, Godby

4 May 1997
16:00

Czech Republic

18–0
(4-0, 6-0, 8-0)

Japan

Godbyhallen, Godby

4 May 1997
20:00

Norway

7–1
(2-0, 2-1, 3-0)

Latvia

Godbyhallen, Godby

5 May 1997
16:00

Latvia

12–1
(5-0, 3-0, 4-1)

Japan

Godbyhallen, Godby

5 May 1997
20:00

Finland

7–2
(2-1, 2-0, 3-1)

Czech Republic

Godbyhallen, Godby

6 May 1997
16:00

Japan

0–23
(0-8, 0-7, 0-8)

Norway

Godbyhallen, Godby

6 May 1997
20:00

Latvia

3–8
(0-2, 3-3, 0-3)

Finland

Godbyhallen, Godby

7 May 1997
16:00

Czech Republic

7–1
(3-0, 1-0, 3-1)

Latvia

Godbyhallen, Godby

7 May 1997
20:00

Finland

4–1
(2-1, 0-0, 2-0)

Norway

Godbyhallen, Godby

== Final stage ==
Semifinals
A1	Sweden	8
B2	Norway	0
B1	Finland	2
A2	Switzerland	0

Finals
A1	Sweden	4
B1	Finland	2
Third place
B2	Norway	3(2)
A2	Switzerland	3(0)

8 May 1997
12:00

Japan

2–4
(2-2, 0-1, 0-1)

Austria

Godbyhallen, Godby

8 May 1997
17:00

Latvia

6–3
(2-0, 0-0, 4-3)

Germany

Godbyhallen, Godby

8 May 1997
20:00

Russia

5–3
(1-1, 4-1, 0-1)

Czech Republic

Godbyhallen, Godby

9 May 1997
16:00

Sweden

8–0
(1-0, 2-0, 5-0)

Norway

Godbyhallen, Godby

9 May 1997
19:00

Finland

2–0
(0-0, 1-0, 1-0)

Switzerland

Godbyhallen, Godby

10 May 1997
13:00

Norway

3–3 (a.e.t)
(2-1, 0-0, 1-2, 0-0)
Pen: 2-0

Switzerland

Godbyhallen, Godby

10 May 1997
16:00

Sweden

4–2
(1-1, 2-1, 1-0)

Finland

Godbyhallen, Godby

== Final ranking ==
1st place, gold medalist(s)	Sweden
2nd place, silver medalist(s)	Finland
3rd place, bronze medalist(s)	Norway
4	Switzerland
5	Russia
6	Czech Republic
7	Latvia
8	Germany
9	Austria
10	Japan

== Top scorers ==
	Player	G	A	P
1	Sara Wiksten (SWE)	16	5	21
2	Helena Lindberg (SWE)	8	13	21
3	Johanna Ekeroth (SWE)	13	7	20
4	Åsa Karlsson (SWE)	8	7	15
5	Pernilla Gunnskog (SWE)	6	5	11
6	Nicole Spicher (SUI)	8	2	10
7	Hermine Dahlerus (SWE)	6	4	10
8	Linda Werner (SWE)	5	5	10
9	Linda Kristiansen (SWE)	3	6	9
10	Carina Rosell (SWE)	6	2	8

== All star team ==
Goalkeeper: Lena Schjölin (SWE)
Defender: Pirjo Haukamaa (FIN)
Defender: Jenny Magnusson (SWE)
Centre: Åsa Karlsson (SWE)
Forward: Birgitte Lersbyggen (NOR)
Forward: Helena Lindberg (SWE)

MVP: Åsa Karlsson (SWE)

== Sources ==
- IFF tournament site
