= Women's World Floorball Championship =

International floorball competitions for women's national teams

- Most recent season or competition: 2025 Women's World Floorball Championships
- Sport: Floorball
- Founded: 1997; 29 years ago
- No. of teams: 16 (finals)
- Continent: International (IFF)
- Most recent champions: Switzerland (2025, 2nd title)
- Most titles: Sweden (11 titles, the last in 2023)
- Related competitions: Men's World Championship; Under-19 World Championships
- Website: floorball.sport

The Women's World Floorball Championship is an international floorball competition contested by the senior women's national teams of the members of the International Floorball Federation (IFF). It is held regularly in odd years since 1997. In even years, the men's championship is played. The tournament takes place in December.

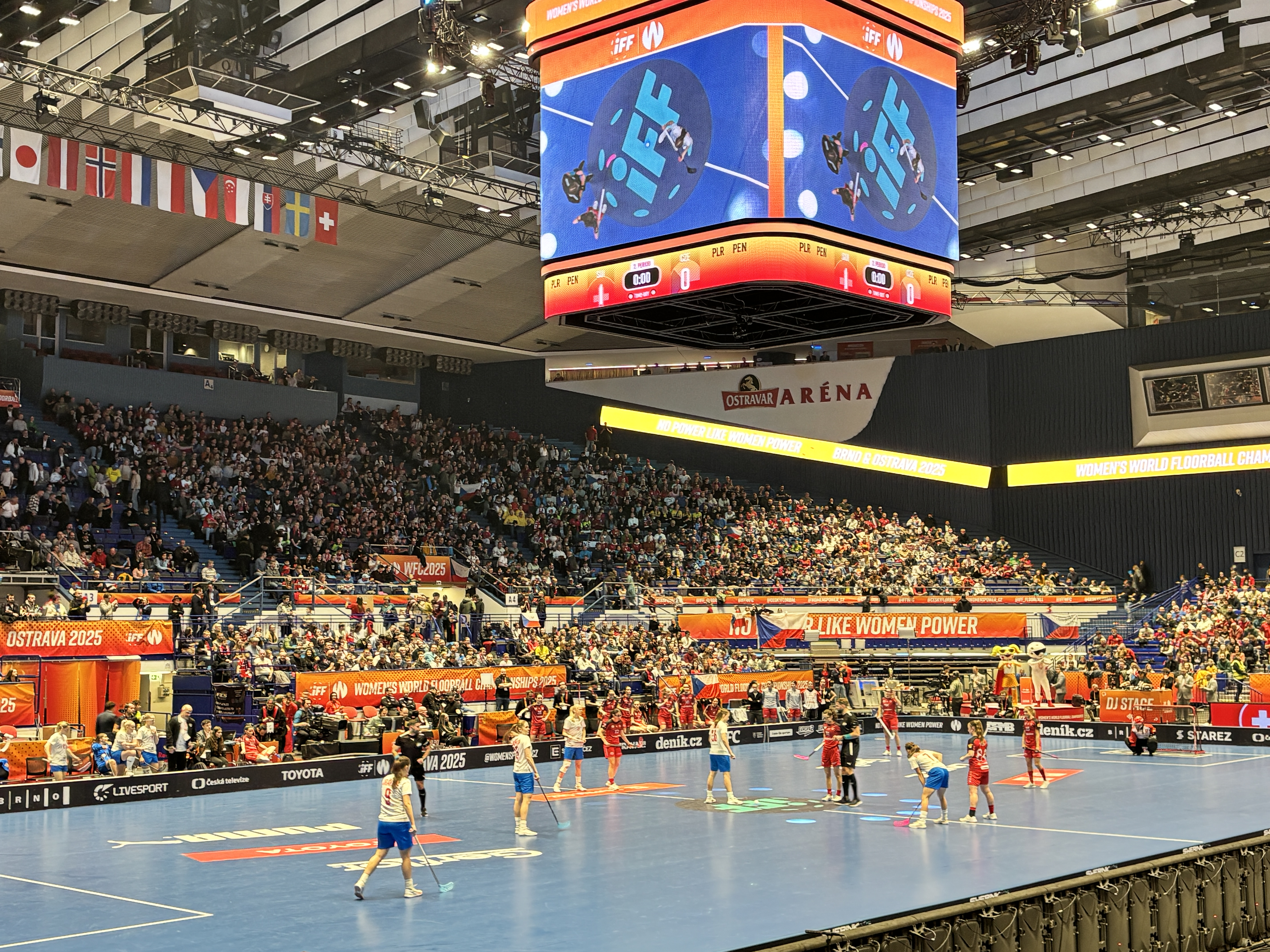
Czechia–Switzerland final match at 2025 tournament

The reigning champion from the most recent 2025 championship held in the Czech Republic, and a two-time overall winner, is Switzerland. The most successful team, with eleven titles, is Sweden. Finland has won twice and is the only country to have won a medal at every tournament. The only other medalists are the Czech Republic, with one silver and two bronze medals, and Norway, with two bronzes.

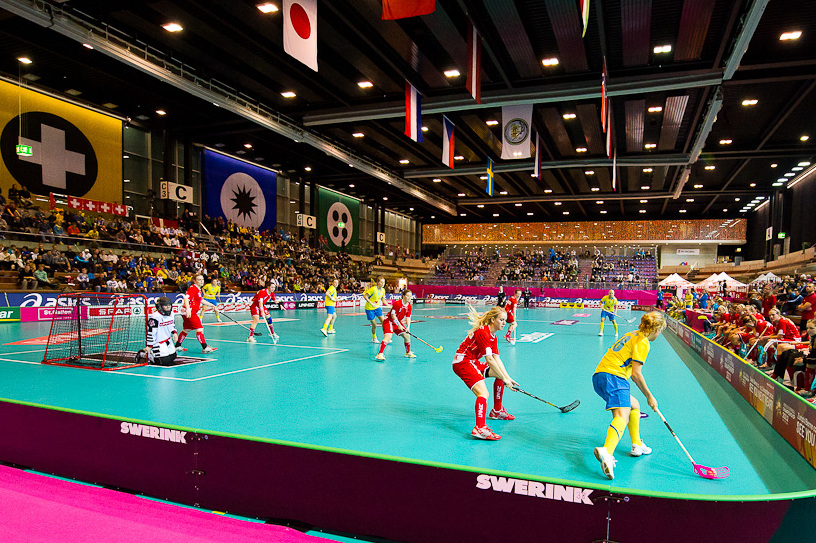
Sweden–Denmark match at 2011 tournament

The last championship took place in 2025 in the Czech Republic. The next will take place in 2027 in Finland.

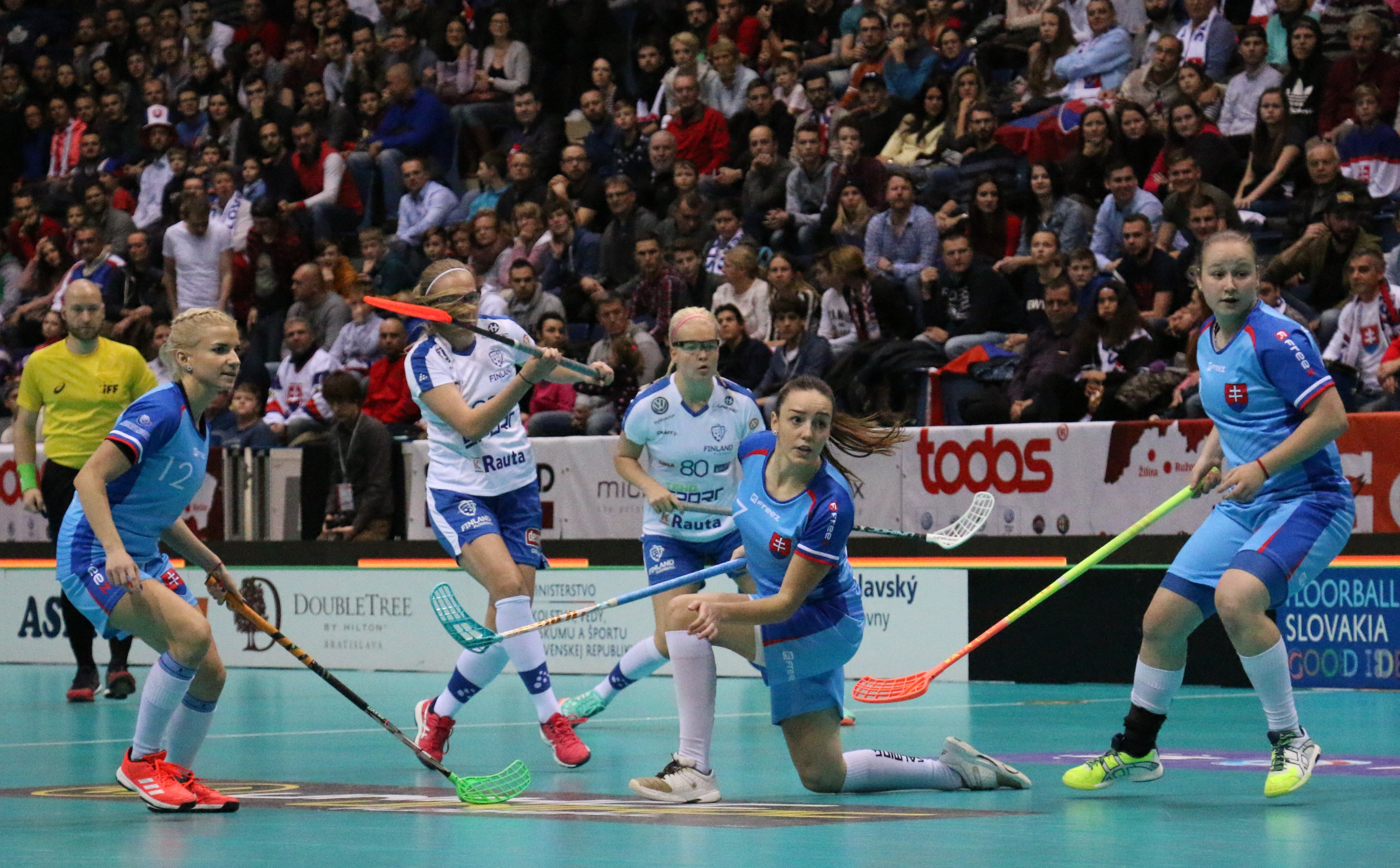
Finland–Slovakia quarterfinal match at 2017 championships

== Format ==
There are 16 teams participating in the tournament. The host country is automatically guaranteed a spot, while the remaining 15 spots are determined through regional qualifiers. These qualifiers, typically comprising several European tournaments and one each for the Americas and Asia-Oceania, are usually held at the beginning of the year before the championship itself. Starting with the 2027 championship, they will instead take place in the autumn of the previous year.

The teams are then drawn into four groups (A–D), each consisting of four teams. Groups A and B are drawn from the top-ranked teams according to the IFF rankings, while Groups C and D are drawn from the remaining teams. Within a group, teams play against each other. The top two teams from Groups A and B advance directly to the quarter-finals. The other two teams from Groups A and B and the top two teams from Groups C and D compete in a playoff preliminary round.

Next, the playoffs are played by elimination. The eliminated teams, including the teams that did not qualify for the playoffs, participate in additional placement matches.

The entire tournament spans nine days, from one weekend to another. During that time, teams play five to seven matches.

== Format history ==
The first World Championship in 1997 was preceded by the only European Championship in 1995.

The quarter-finals were played for the first time in 2011. Until the 2009 World Championship, with the exception of the first tournament, teams were divided into two divisions (A and B). In Division A, teams competed in two groups, with the top two teams from each group advancing to the semi-finals. The winners of the semi-finals played in the final, while the losing teams contested the bronze medal match. The bottom teams of both groups played for relegation from Division A, while the winner of Division B was promoted.

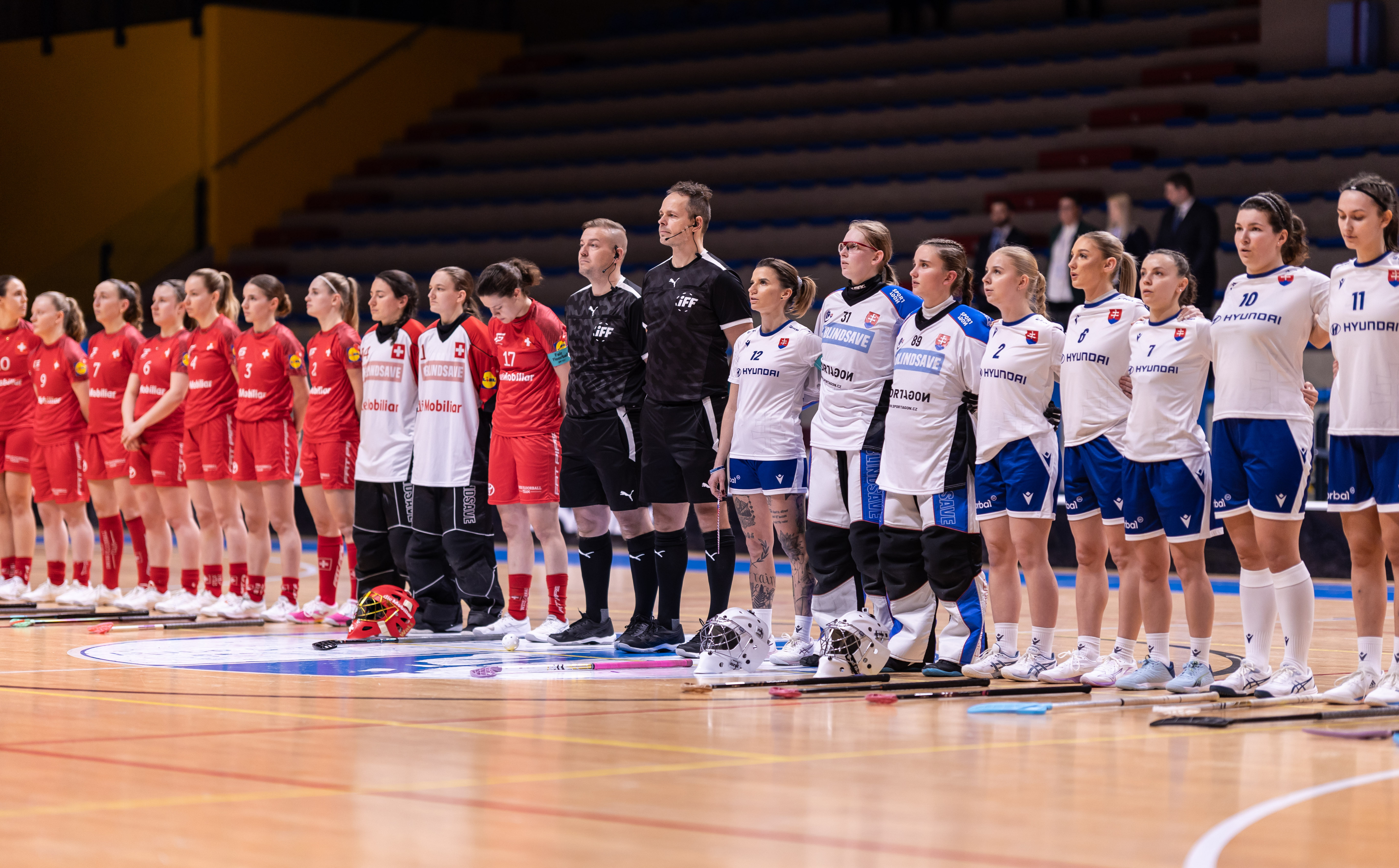
Teams of Switzerland and Slovakia before qualification match for 2025 championship

Until the 2007 World Championship, the tournament was held in May or early June.

Qualification was introduced for the 2009 World Championship, but only from 2015 onwards did all teams (except the host nation) have to qualify. Previously, the top teams from the previous championship received automatic qualification.

The current system, where the higher-ranked teams are placed into two groups and the remaining teams into two separate groups, was introduced at the 2015 World Championship, along with the playoff preliminary round.

== Tournaments ==
| Year | Final venue | Winners | Score | Runners-up | Third place | Score | Fourth place |
|---|---|---|---|---|---|---|---|
| 1997; Details | (Finland); Mariehamn | Sweden | 4–2 | Finland | Norway | 4–3 PSO | Switzerland |
| 1999; Details | (Sweden); Borlänge | Finland | 3–1 | Switzerland | Sweden | 5–1 | Norway |
| 2001; Details | (Latvia); Riga | Finland | 2–0 | Sweden | Norway | 4–3 | Switzerland |
| 2003; Details | (Switzerland); Bern | Sweden | 8–1 | Switzerland | Finland | 4–2 | Norway |
| 2005; Details | Singapore | Switzerland | 4–3 | Finland | Sweden | 15–1 | Norway |
| 2007; Details | (Denmark); Frederikshavn | Sweden | 7–3 | Finland | Switzerland | 7–1 | Latvia |
| 2009; Details | (Sweden); Västerås | Sweden | 6–2 | Switzerland | Finland | 3–1 | Czech Republic |
| 2011; Details | (Switzerland); St. Gallen | Sweden | 4–2 | Finland | Czech Republic | 3–2 | Switzerland |
| 2013; Details | (Czech Republic); Brno, Ostrava | Sweden | 5–1 | Finland | Switzerland | 4–3 OT | Czech Republic |
| 2015; Details | (Finland); Tampere | Sweden | 5–4 (p) | Finland | Switzerland | 5–4 | Czech Republic |
| 2017; Details | (Slovakia); Bratislava | Sweden | 6–5 (p) | Finland | Switzerland | 3–2 | Czech Republic |
| 2019; Details | (Switzerland); Neuchâtel | Sweden | 3–2 OT | Switzerland | Finland | 5–4 OT | Czech Republic |
| 2021; Details | (Sweden); Uppsala | Sweden | 4–3 OT | Finland | Switzerland | 5–2 | Czech Republic |
| 2023; Details | Singapore | Sweden | 6–4 | Finland | Czech Republic | 5–4 | Switzerland |
| 2025; Details | (Czech Republic); Brno, Ostrava | Switzerland | 2–0 | Czech Republic | Finland | 6–4 | Sweden |
| 2027; Details | (Finland); Turku | | | | | | |

== Medal table ==
| Rank | Country | Gold | Silver | Bronze | Medals |
|---|---|---|---|---|---|
| 1 | Sweden | 11 | 1 | 2 | 14 |
| 2 | Finland | 2 | 9 | 4 | 15 |
| 3 | Switzerland | 2 | 4 | 5 | 11 |
| 4 | Czech Republic | 0 | 1 | 2 | 3 |
| 5 | Norway | 0 | 0 | 2 | 2 |
| Total | | 15 | 15 | 15 | 45 |

== Participation details ==
| Team | (Finland) 1997 | (Sweden) 1999 | (Latvia) 2001 | (Switzerland) 2003 | (Singapore) 2005 | (Denmark) 2007 | (Sweden) 2009 | (Switzerland) 2011 | (Czech Republic) 2013 | (Finland) 2015 | (Slovakia) 2017 | (Switzerland) 2019 | (Sweden) 2021 | (Singapore) 2023 | (Czech Republic) 2025 | Years |
|---|---|---|---|---|---|---|---|---|---|---|---|---|---|---|---|---|
| Australia | – | – | – | – | – | – | – | 15th | 12th | 12th | 15th | 11th | WD | 16th | 14th | 7 |
| Austria | 9th | – | 8th | – | – | – | – | – | – | – | – | – | – | – | – | 2 |
| Canada | – | – | – | – | – | – | – | – | 13th | – | – | – | – | – | – | 1 |
| Czech Republic | 6th | 5th | 5th | 7th | 7th | 5th | 4th | 3rd | 4th | 4th | 4th | 4th | 4th | 3rd | 2nd | 15 |
| Denmark | – | – | – | – | – | 6th | 9th | 8th | 11th | 10th | 9th | 10th | 8th | 8th | 8th | 10 |
| Estonia | – | – | – | – | – | – | – | – | – | – | 11th | 14th | 13th | 13th | 12th | 5 |
| Finland | 2nd | 1st | 1st | 3rd | 2nd | 2nd | 3rd | 2nd | 2nd | 2nd | 2nd | 3rd | 2nd | 2nd | 3rd | 15 |
| France | – | – | – | – | – | – | – | – | – | – | – | – | – | 15th | – | 1 |
| Germany | 8th | 6th | 7th | 8th | – | – | – | 11th | 8th | 6th | 10th | 7th | 10th | 10th | 10th | 12 |
| Hungary | – | – | – | – | – | – | – | 14th | 14th | – | – | – | – | – | – | 2 |
| Italy | – | – | – | – | – | – | – | – | – | – | – | – | 16th | – | – | 1 |
| Japan | 10th | – | – | – | 8th | – | – | 16th | 15th | 15th | 14th | 13th | WD | 9th | 13th | 9 |
| Latvia | 7th | 7th | 6th | 6th | 5th | 4th | 6th | 7th | 5th | 5th | 6th | 8th | 9th | 7th | 5th | 15 |
| Netherlands | – | – | – | – | – | – | – | 13th | – | 14th | – | – | – | – | 11th | 3 |
| Norway | 3rd | 4th | 3rd | 4th | 4th | 8th | 7th | 5th | 6th | 9th | 8th | 9th | 7th | 11th | 6th | 15 |
| Poland | – | – | – | – | – | – | 8th | 6th | 7th | 7th | 7th | 5th | 5th | 6th | 9th | 9 |
| Russia | 5th | 8th | – | 5th | 6th | 7th | 5th | 10th | 10th | 11th | – | – | 11th | – | – | 10 |
| Singapore | – | – | – | – | – | 10th | – | – | – | 16th | 16th | 12th | 14th | 12th | 16th | 7 |
| Slovakia | – | – | – | – | – | – | – | 12th | 9th | 8th | 5th | 6th | 6th | 5th | 7th | 8 |
| South Korea | – | – | – | – | – | – | – | – | 16th | – | – | – | – | – | – | 1 |
| Sweden | 1st | 3rd | 2nd | 1st | 3rd | 1st | 1st | 1st | 1st | 1st | 1st | 1st | 1st | 1st | 4th | 15 |
| Switzerland | 4th | 2nd | 4th | 2nd | 1st | 3rd | 2nd | 4th | 3rd | 3rd | 3rd | 2nd | 3rd | 4th | 1st | 15 |
| Thailand | – | – | – | – | – | – | – | – | – | – | 13th | 15th | 15th | – | – | 3 |
| United States | – | – | – | – | – | 9th | 10th | 9th | – | 13th | 12th | 16th | 12th | 14th | 15th | 9 |
| Debuts | 10 | 0 | 0 | 0 | 0 | 3 | 1 | 4 | 2 | 0 | 2 | 0 | 1 | 1 | 0 | |
| Cumulative | 10 | 10 | 10 | 10 | 10 | 13 | 14 | 18 | 20 | 20 | 22 | 22 | 23 | 24 | 24 | |

== See also ==
- List of floorball world champions
- Men's World Floorball Championship
- Under-19 World Floorball Championships
