= Sweden women's national floorball team =

- IFF Ranking: 4th (2025)
- Championships: 11: World Championships (1997, 2003, 2007, 2009, 2011, 2013, 2015, 2017, 2019, 2021, 2023); 1: European Championships (1995)

Sweden women's national floorball team (Swedish: Sveriges damlandslag i innebandy) represents Sweden in international competitions of women's floorball.

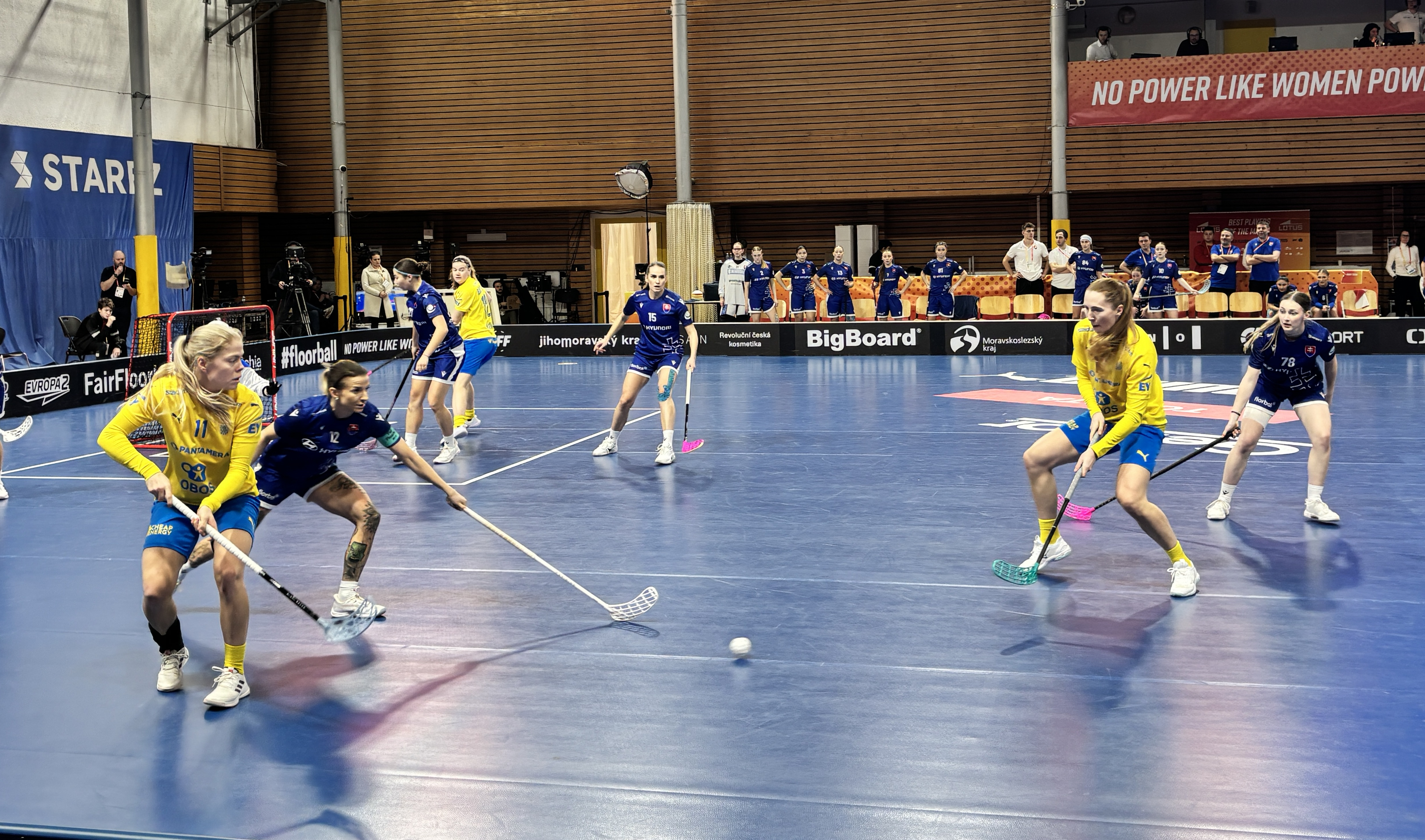
Swedish national team players (in yellow) in a match against Slovakia at 2025 World Championship

The team won the title at the European Championship in 1995 and a total of eleven World Championship titles in 1997 and 2003, and record nine in a row from 2007 to 2023. Based on their tournament performance and overall record, Sweden is considered the most successful national team in women's international floorball.

At the most recent championship in 2025, they finished fourth and failed to win a medal for the first time. Already in the semifinals, they lost a streak of 54 undefeated matches at World Championships, which had begun in 2007. In the IFF World Ranking, they are fourth (behind Finland and ahead of Latvia), after finishing first and fourth at the last two championships in 2023 and 2025.

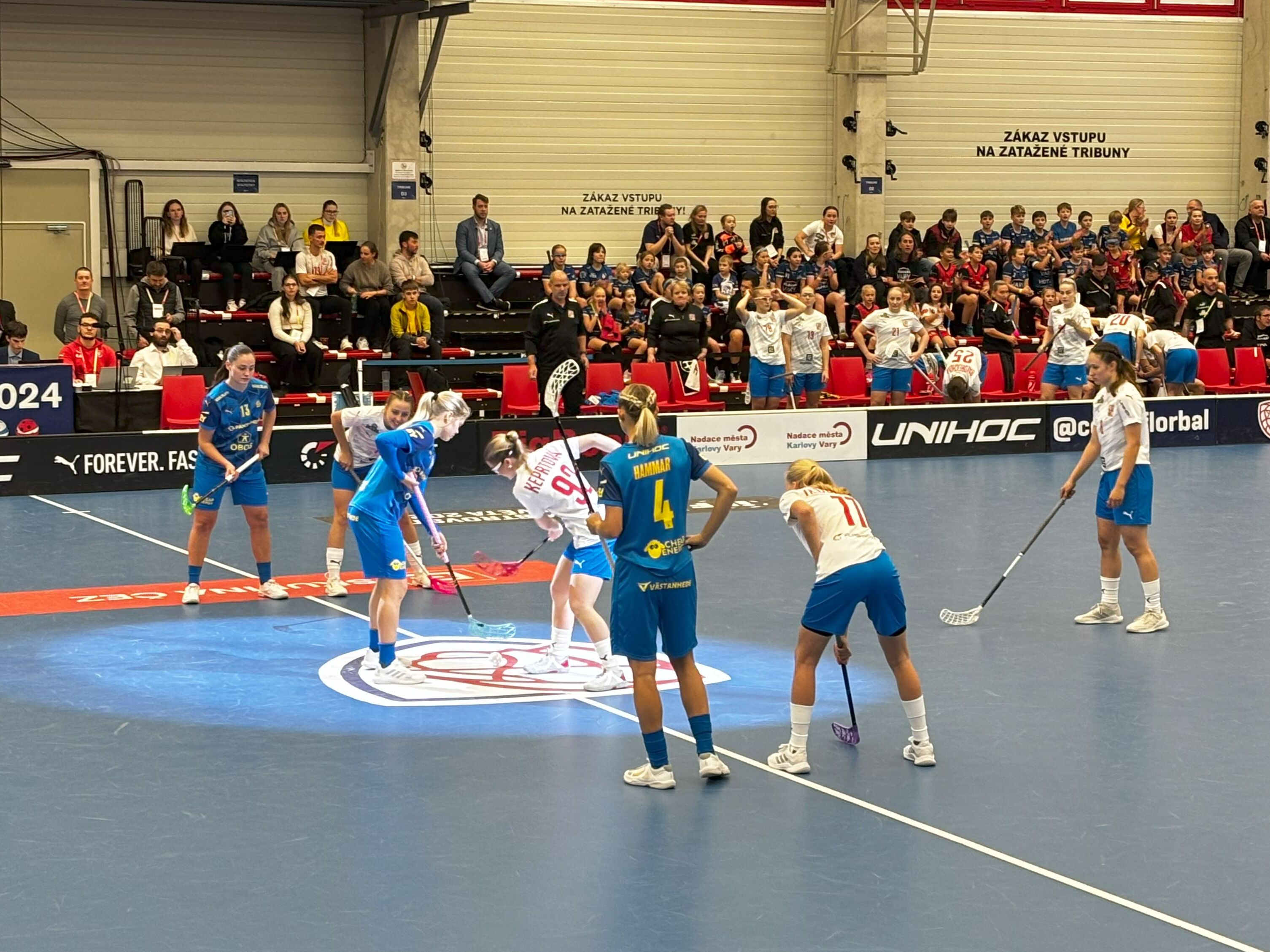
Swedish national team players (in blue) in a match against Czechia at the Euro Floorball Tour 2024

The team played their first match in a world championship on 3 May 1997 against Austria. The match ended in victory with 32–0 and is still the biggest victory ever in the floorball world championships. The team went unbeaten through the tournament and became the first first world champions of women's floorball.

== World Championships ==
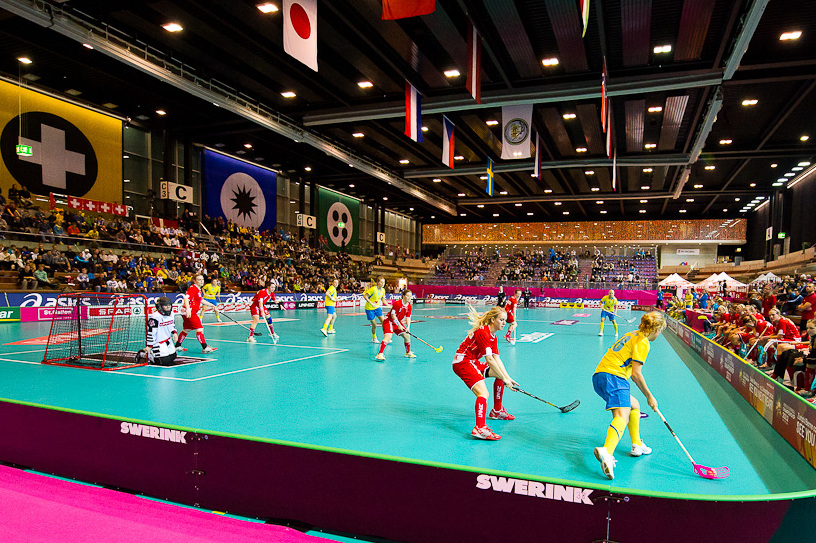
The Swedish team (in yellow and blue) in a match against Denmark at the 2011 World Championship

| Year | Hosting Country | Rank | Final match |
|---|---|---|---|
| 1997 | Finland | 1st place | Finland 4–2 |
| 1999 | Sweden | 3rd place | Norway 5–1 |
| 2001 | Latvia | 2nd place | Finland 0–2 |
| 2003 | Switzerland | 1st place | Switzerland 8–1 |
| 2005 | Singapore | 3rd place | Norway 15–1 |
| 2007 | Denmark | 1st place | Finland 7–3 |
| 2009 | Sweden | 1st place | Switzerland 6–2 |
| 2011 | Switzerland | 1st place | Finland 4–2 |
| 2013 | Czech Republic | 1st place | Finland 5–1 |
| 2015 | Finland | 1st place | Finland 5–4 SO |
| 2017 | Slovakia | 1st place | Finland 6–5 SO |
| 2019 | Switzerland | 1st place | Switzerland 3–2 OT |
| 2021 | Sweden | 1st place | Finland 4–3 OT |
| 2023 | Singapore | 1st place | Finland 6–4 |
| 2025 | Czech Republic | 4th place | Finland 4–6 |

Medal record
| Medal | Won | Year(s) |
|---|---|---|
| 1st place, gold medalist(s) | 11 | 1997, 2003, 2007, 2009, 2011, 2013, 2015, 2017, 2019, 2021, 2023 |
| 2nd place, silver medalist(s) | 1 | 2001 |
| 3rd place, bronze medalist(s) | 2 | 1999, 2005 |

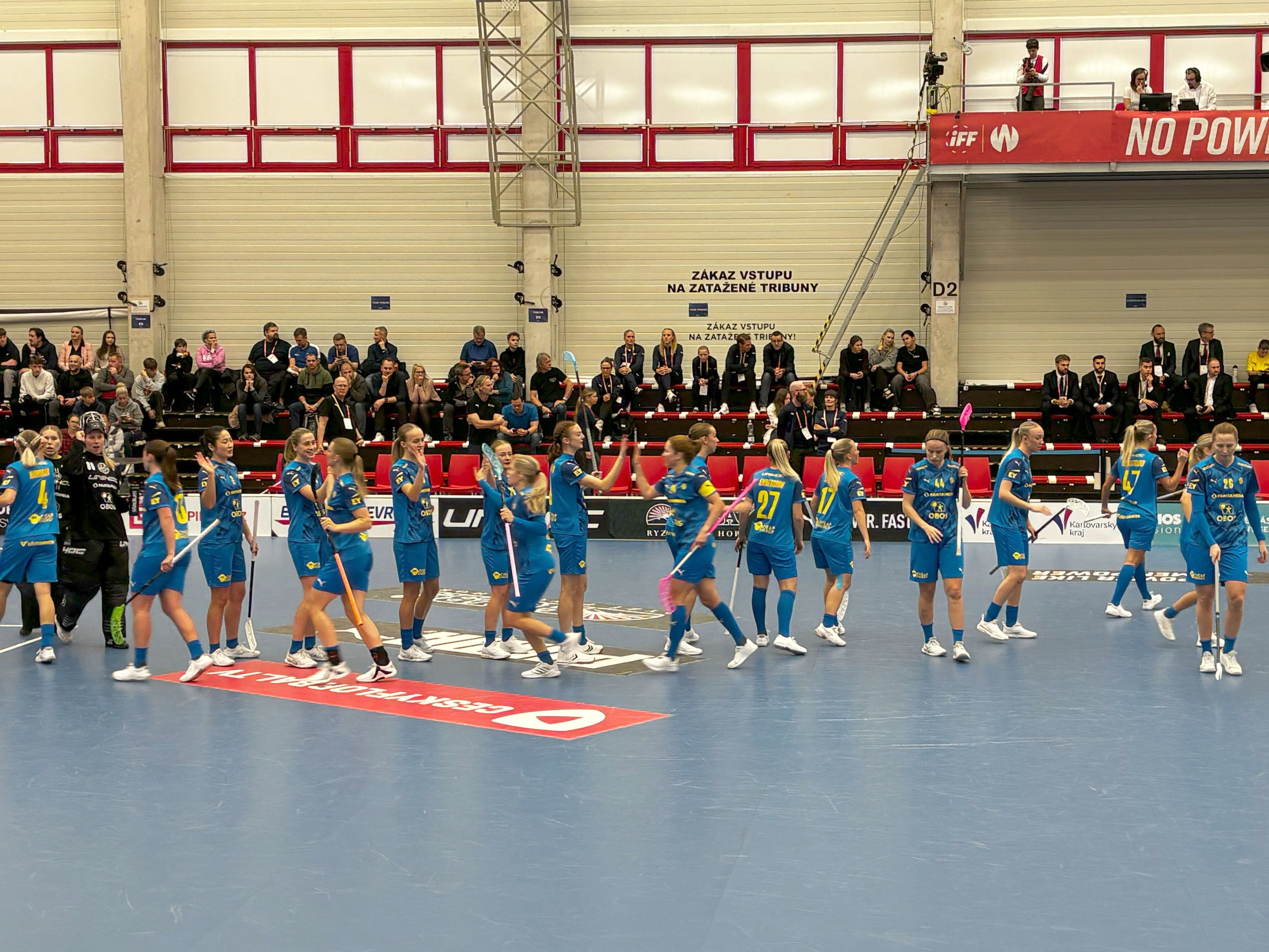
The Swedish team celebrates a goal in a match against Czechia at the Euro Floorball Tour 2024

== World Games ==
| Year | Hosting Country | Rank | Final match |
|---|---|---|---|
| 2025 | China | 2nd place | Finland 2–3 |

== European Championships ==
| Year | Hosting Country | Rank | Final match |
|---|---|---|---|
| 1995 | Switzerland | 1st place | Norway 8–2 |

== Known Players ==
- Maja Viström (2021, 2023, 2025)
- Emelie Wibron (2009, 2011, 2015, 2017, 2019, 2021, 2023, 2025)
- Anna Wijk (2009, 2011, 2013, 2015, 2017, 2019)

== All-time world championships results ==
| Year | Position | GP | W | D | L | GF | GA | +/- |
|---|---|---|---|---|---|---|---|---|
| 1997 (Finland) | 1st | 6 | 6 | 0 | 0 | 87 | 3 | +84 |
| 1999 (Sweden) | 3rd | 4 | 3 | 0 | 1 | 21 | 6 | +15 |
| 2001 (Latvia) | 2nd | 5 | 4 | 0 | 1 | 34 | 7 | +27 |
| 2003 (Switzerland) | 1st | 5 | 4 | 0 | 1 | 42 | 11 | +31 |
| 2005 (Singapore) | 3rd | 5 | 4 | 0 | 1 | 53 | 7 | +46 |
| 2007 (Denmark) | 1st | 6 | 5 | 0 | 1 | 56 | 10 | +46 |
| 2009 (Sweden) | 1st | 6 | 6 | 0 | 0 | 77 | 10 | +67 |
| 2011 (Switzerland) | 1st | 6 | 6 | 0 | 0 | 102 | 5 | +97 |
| 2013 (Czech Republic) | 1st | 6 | 6 | 0 | 0 | 71 | 8 | +63 |
| 2015 (Finland) | 1st | 6 | 6 | 0 | 0 | 67 | 11 | +56 |
| 2017 (Slovakia) | 1st | 6 | 6 | 0 | 0 | 86 | 13 | +73 |
| 2019 (Switzerland) | 1st | 6 | 6 | 0 | 0 | 83 | 12 | +71 |
| 2021 (Sweden) | 1st | 6 | 6 | 0 | 0 | 82 | 10 | +72 |
| 2023 (Singapore) | 1st | 6 | 6 | 0 | 0 | 74 | 14 | +60 |
| Total: | 14/14 | 79 | 74 | 0 | 5 | 938 | 127 | +811 |

== World championships results against other teams ==
| Team | GP | W | D | L | GF | GA | GD | BW | BD |
|---|---|---|---|---|---|---|---|---|---|
| Austria | 1 | 1 | 0 | 0 | 32 | 0 | +32 | 32–0 | |
| Czech Republic | 5 | 5 | 0 | 0 | 45 | 8 | +37 | 17–2 | |
| Denmark | 1 | 1 | 0 | 0 | 15 | 1 | +14 | 15–1 | |
| Finland | 15 | 11 | 0 | 4 | 72 | 41 | +31 | 10–2 | 0–2 |
| Germany | 7 | 7 | 0 | 0 | 120 | 8 | +112 | 23–2 | |
| Japan | 2 | 2 | 0 | 0 | 32 | 1 | +31 | 23–0 | |
| Latvia | 6 | 6 | 0 | 0 | 73 | 4 | +69 | 21–0 | |
| Norway | 9 | 8 | 0 | 1 | 96 | 11 | +85 | 19–0 | 1–2 |
| Poland | 2 | 2 | 0 | 0 | 33 | 2 | +31 | 16–0 | |
| Russia | 4 | 4 | 0 | 0 | 66 | 3 | +63 | 21–1 | |
| Singapore | 1 | 1 | 0 | 0 | 23 | 1 | +22 | 23–1 | |
| Slovakia | 2 | 2 | 0 | 0 | 37 | 4 | +33 | 22–3 | |
| Switzerland | 10 | 10 | 0 | 0 | 76 | 16 | +60 | 14–1 | |
| United States | 2 | 2 | 0 | 0 | 58 | 1 | +57 | 30–0 | |

Updated as of WFC 2021.
