= Czech Republic women's national floorball team =

- Coach: Lukáš Procházka
- IFF Ranking: 2nd (2025)

Czech Republic women's national floorball team (Czech: Česká ženská florbalová reprezentace) is the national floorball team of Czech Republic.

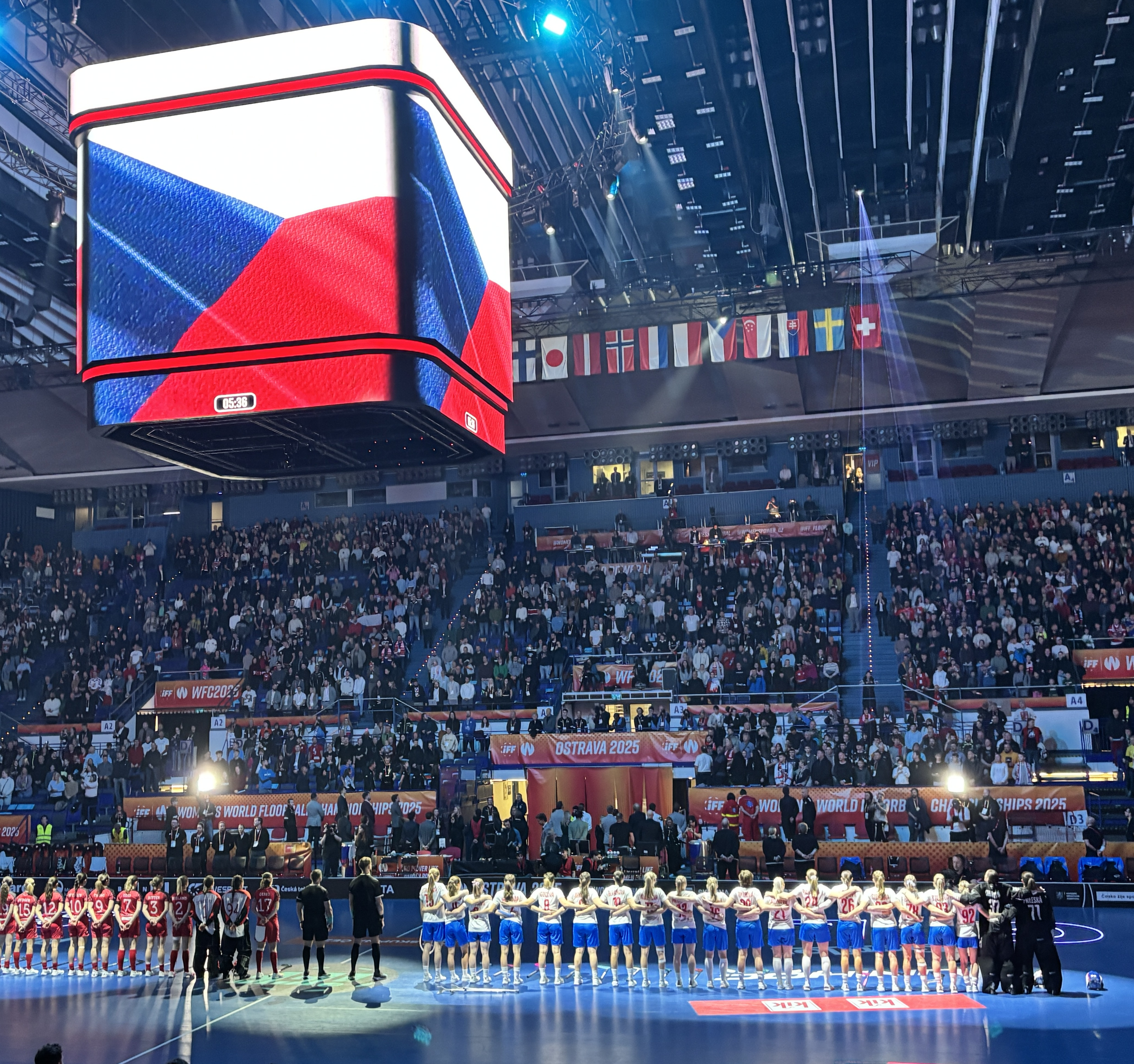
The Czech women's national team before the final of the 2025 World Championships

The team has participated in all World and European Championships to date. Its best result is a second-place finish at the home championship in 2025. They also won two bronze medals from the World Championships in Switzerland in 2011 and in Singapore in 2023. In the medal ranking, the team is therefore in fourth place, behind Switzerland and ahead of Norway. Since 2009, the Czech women have always reached the semifinals at the championships. In the IFF World Ranking, they are second (behind Switzerland and ahead of Finland), after finishing third and second at the last two championships in 2023 and 2025.

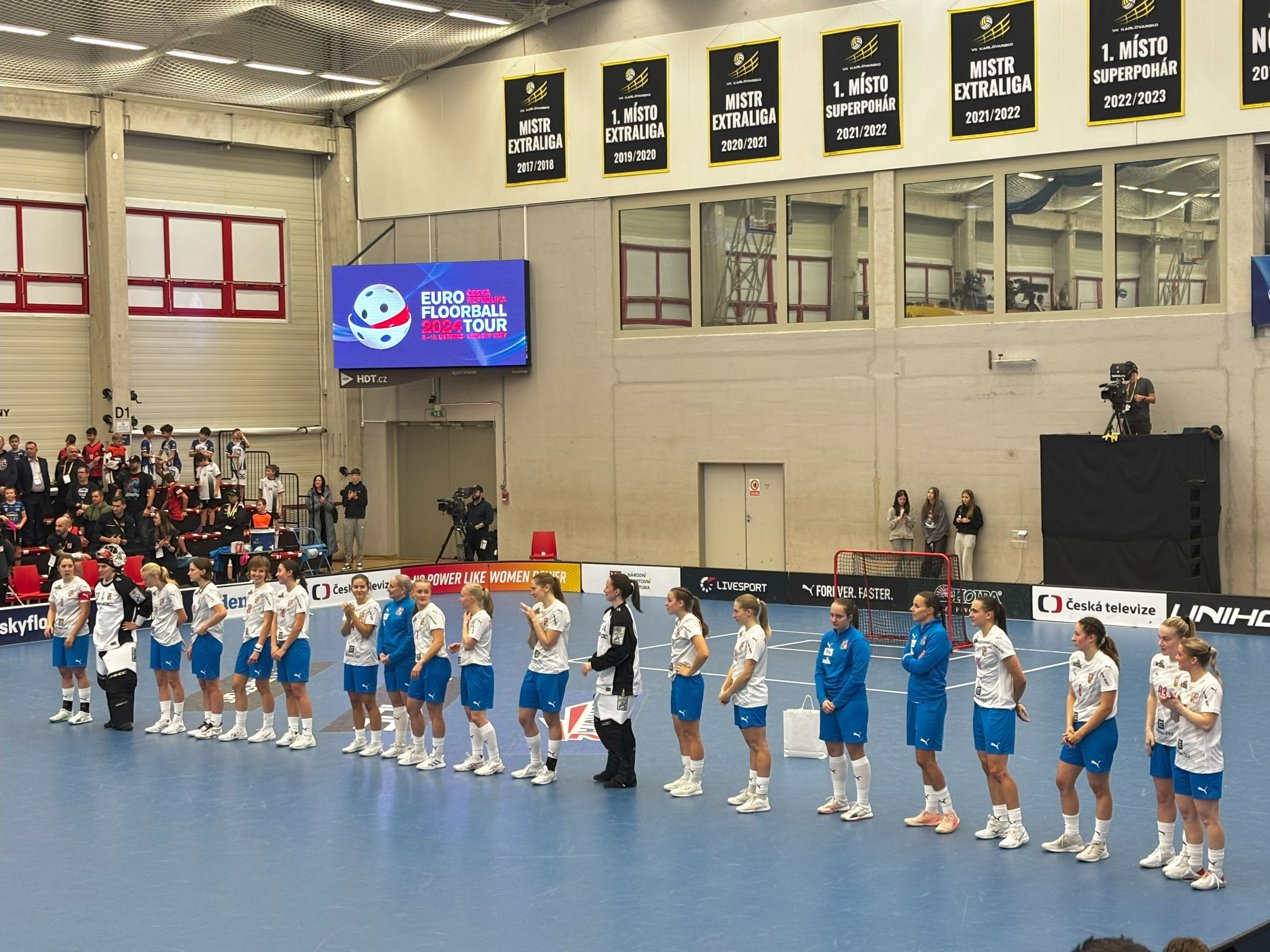
Czech Republic women's national floorball team at Euro Floorball Tour in 2024

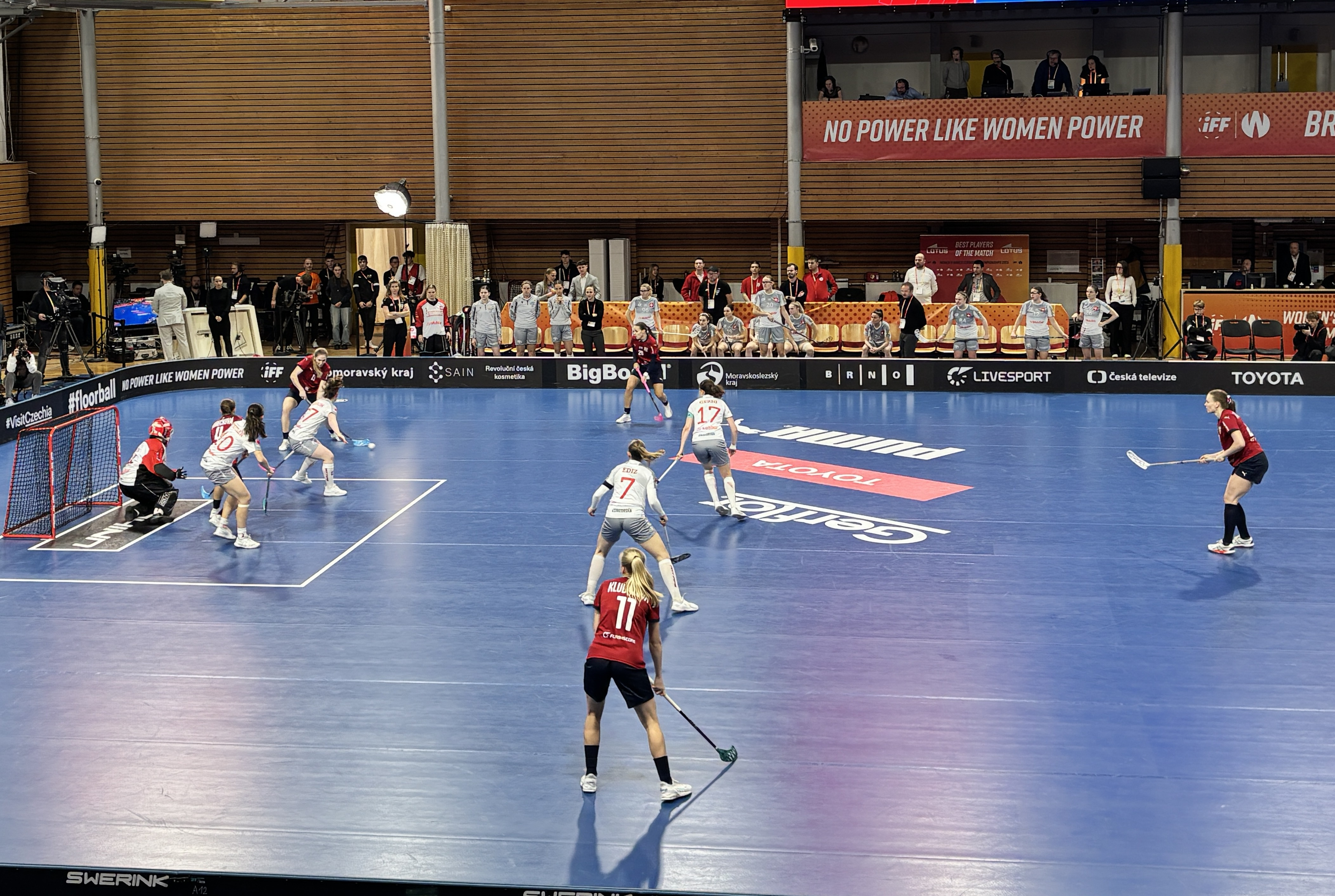
Players of the Czech (in red) and Swiss women's floorball national teams in a match at the 2025 World Championships

== Milestones of the National Team ==
The Czech women's national floorball team played its first match at the first and only Women's European Championships in 1995. It was a winning match against Latvia.

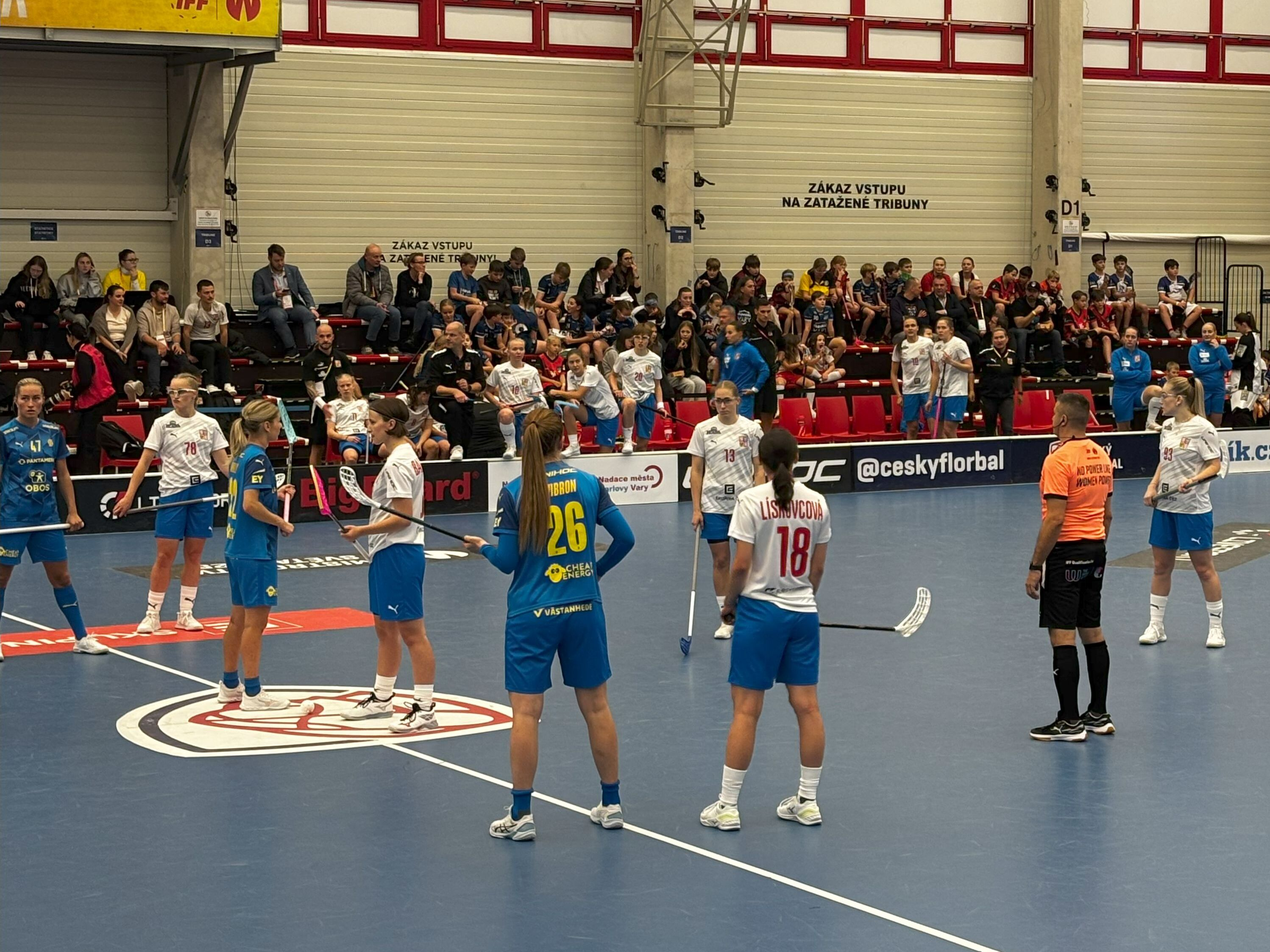
Players of the Czech (in white) and Swedish women's floorball national teams in a match at the Euro Floorball Tour in 2024

Their first success at a major international tournament came in 2006 in Prague at the first Euro Floorball Tour (EFT), where they drew with Switzerland, the reigning world champions at the time. They earned their first draw against Sweden also at the EFT in 2008 and against Finland a year later.

At the World Championships, they fought for medals for the first time in 2009, after achieving their first-ever victory over Norway in the tournament's history. They won their first bronze medal at the next World Championships in 2011. In the third-place match, they defeated Switzerland for the first time at a World Championship. Goalkeeper Jana Christianová became the first Czech woman to be named to the tournament's All-Star team.

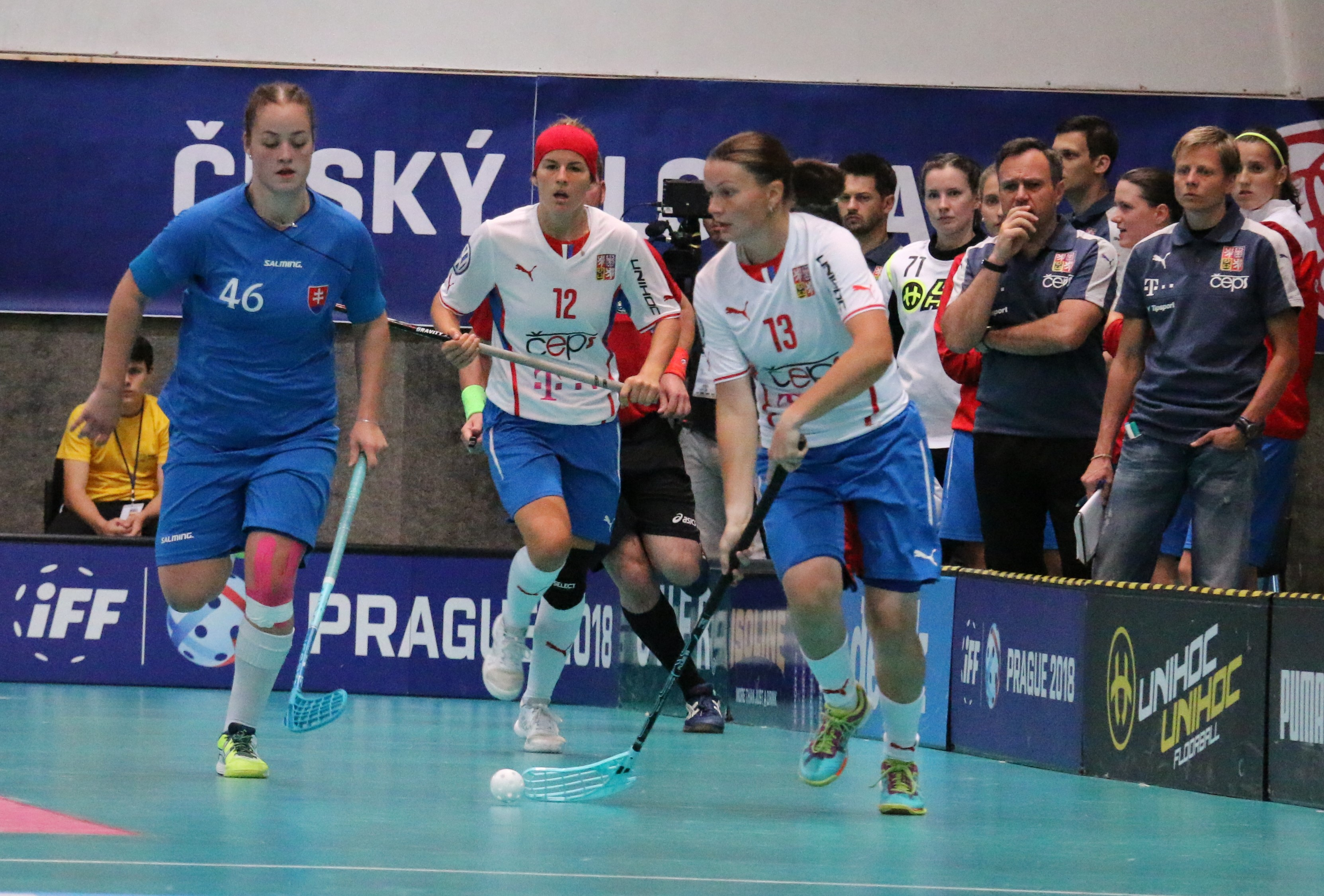
Players of the Czech national team (in white) in a friendly match against Slovakia in 2017

They beat Finland for the first time at the Polish Cup in 2013 and then again at the EFT later that same year. In 2014 in Prague, they won their first silver medal at the EFT after victories over Finland and Switzerland.

They defeated Sweden for the first time at the EFT in September 2023 and earned their second silver medal at the tournament. At the World Championships in the same year, they claimed their second bronze medal, thereby matching Norway in fourth place in the all-time medal standings.

Players of the Czech national team celebrate reaching their first World Championship final in 2025.

In 2025 at the EFT, they first defeated Finland for the sixth time by a record margin of 7–2 (having previously won by at most a single goal), and subsequently beat them again later that year in the World Championship semi-finals, earning their first-ever silver medal. This definitively pushed them ahead of Norway. At this championship, Šárka Staňková became the first Czech woman to be voted Most Valuable Player, and Czech players made up half of the All-Star team.

== World Championships ==
Year	Hosting Country	Rank	Final match
1997	Finland	6th place	Russia 3–5
1999	Sweden	5th place	Germany 8–4
2001	Latvia	5th place	Latvia 5–4 SO
2003	Switzerland	7th place	Germany 4–0
2005	Singapore	7th place	Japan 4–0
2007	Denmark	5th place	Denmark 6–2
2009	Sweden	4th place	Finland 1–3
2011	Switzerland	3rd place	Switzerland 3–2
2013	Czech Republic	4th place	Switzerland 3–4 OT
2015	Finland	4th place	Switzerland 4–5
2017	Slovakia	4th place	Switzerland 2–3
2019	Switzerland	4th place	Finland 4–5 OT
2021	Sweden	4th place	Switzerland 2–5
2023	Singapore	3rd place	Switzerland 5–4
2025	Czech Republic	2nd place	Switzerland 0–2

Medal record
Medal	Won	Year(s)
1st place, gold medalist(s)	0	—
2nd place, silver medalist(s)	1	2025
3rd place, bronze medalist(s)	2	2011, 2023

== World Games ==
Year	Hosting Country	Rank	Final match
2025	China	4th place	Switzerland 3–4

== European Championships ==
Year	Hosting Country	Rank	Final match
1995	Switzerland	6th place	Russia 3–5

== Known Players ==
- Eliška Krupnová (2011, 2013, 2015, 2017, 2019, 2021, 2013)

== See also ==
- Czech Republic men's national floorball team
- Czech Republic women's national under-19 floorball team
- Czech Republic men's national under-19 floorball team
