= Slovakia women's national floorball team =

Female national floorball team

- Coach: Tomáš Martiník
- IFF Ranking: 6th (2025)

Slovakia women's national floorball team is the national floorball team of Slovakia.

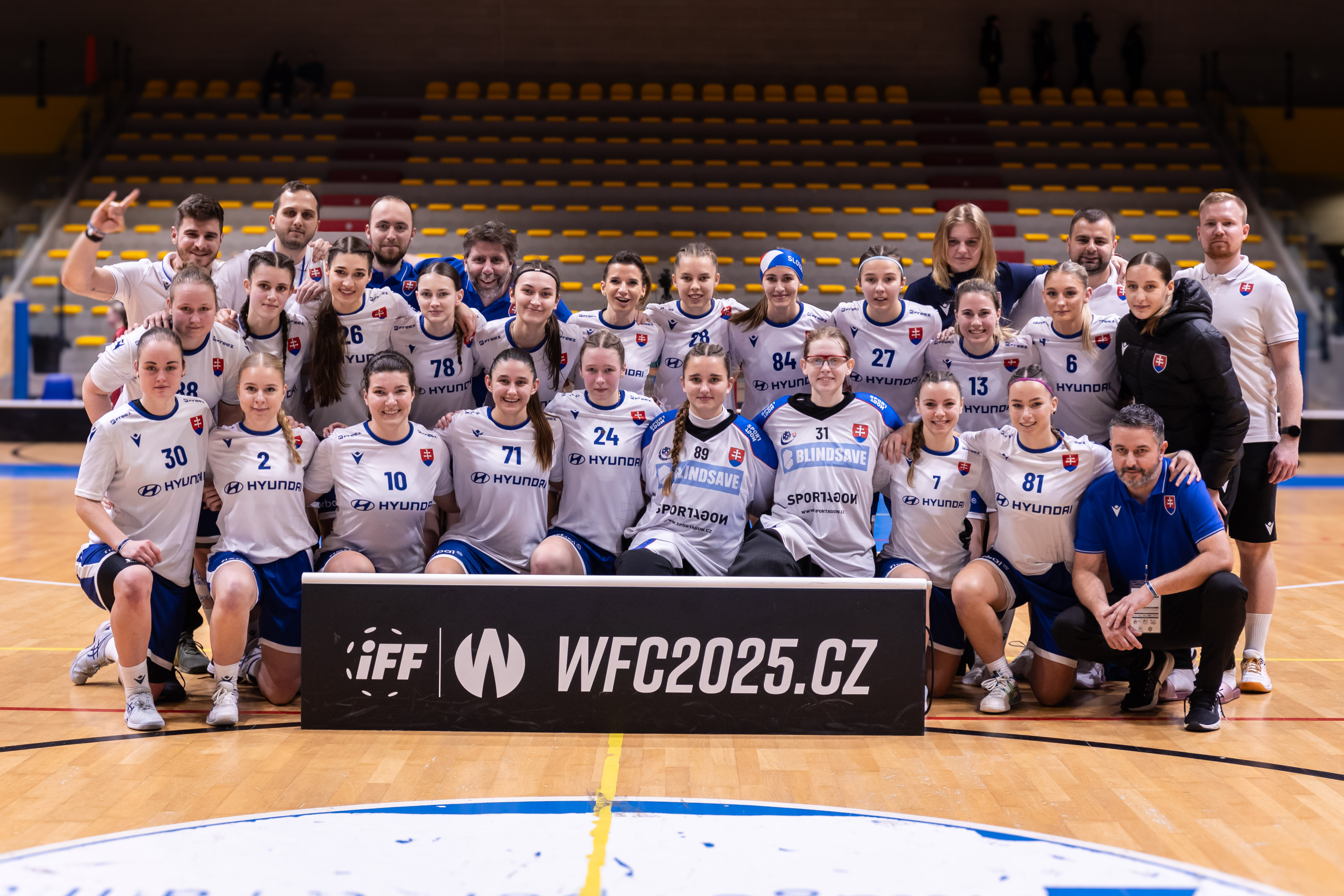
Slovakia national team in 2025 World Championships qualification

The Slovak women's team made their first appearance at the World Championships in 2007 in Division B. They qualified for the main tournament for the first time at the 2011 championship.

The team’s greatest achievements are fifth-place finishes at the 2017 World Championships in Bratislava and the 2023 edition in Singapore. Slovakia is ranked sixth in the IFF World Ranking (behind Latvia and ahead of Poland), following fifth and seventh places at the last two championships in 2023 and 2025. The team also finished in fifth place at the first women's tournament at the World Games 2025.

== World Championships ==
Year	Hosting Country	Rank	Final match	Coach	Slovaks in All-Star Team
2007 B	Denmark	19th place	Spain 5–3		–
2009 B	Sweden	18th place	Japan 3–6		–
2011	Switzerland	12th place	Germany 3–4 OT	Jaroslav Marks (Czech Republic)	–
2013	Czech Republic	9th place	Russia 6–4	Jaroslav Marks (Czech Republic)	–
2015	Finland	8th place	Poland 0–2	Jaroslav Marks (Czech Republic)	–
2017	Slovakia	5th place	Latvia 6–4	Michal Jedlička (Czech Republic)	Paulína Hudáková
2019	Switzerland	6th place	Poland 4–8	Michal Jedlička (Czech Republic)	–
2021	Sweden	6th place	Poland 3–4	Michal Jedlička (Czech Republic)	–
2023	Singapore	5th place	Poland 7–4	Michal Jedlička (Czech Republic)	–
2025	Czech Republic	7th place	Denmark 7–6	Michal Jedlička (Czech Republic)	–

== World Games ==
Year	Hosting Country	Rank	Final match	Coach
2025	China	5th place	Singapore 13–2	Michal Jedlička (Czech Republic)

== All-time world championships results ==
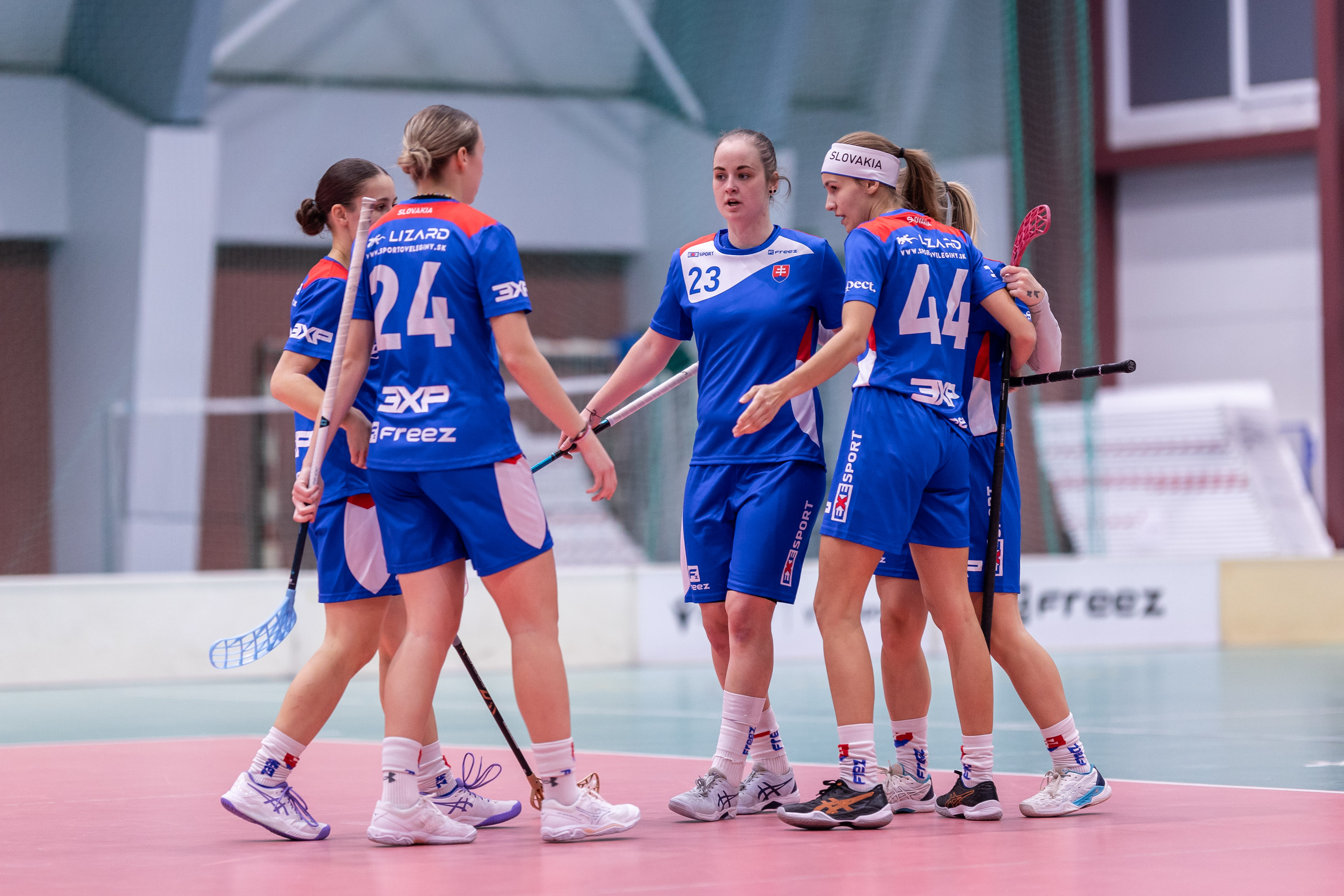
Slovakia national team players in friendly match in 2024

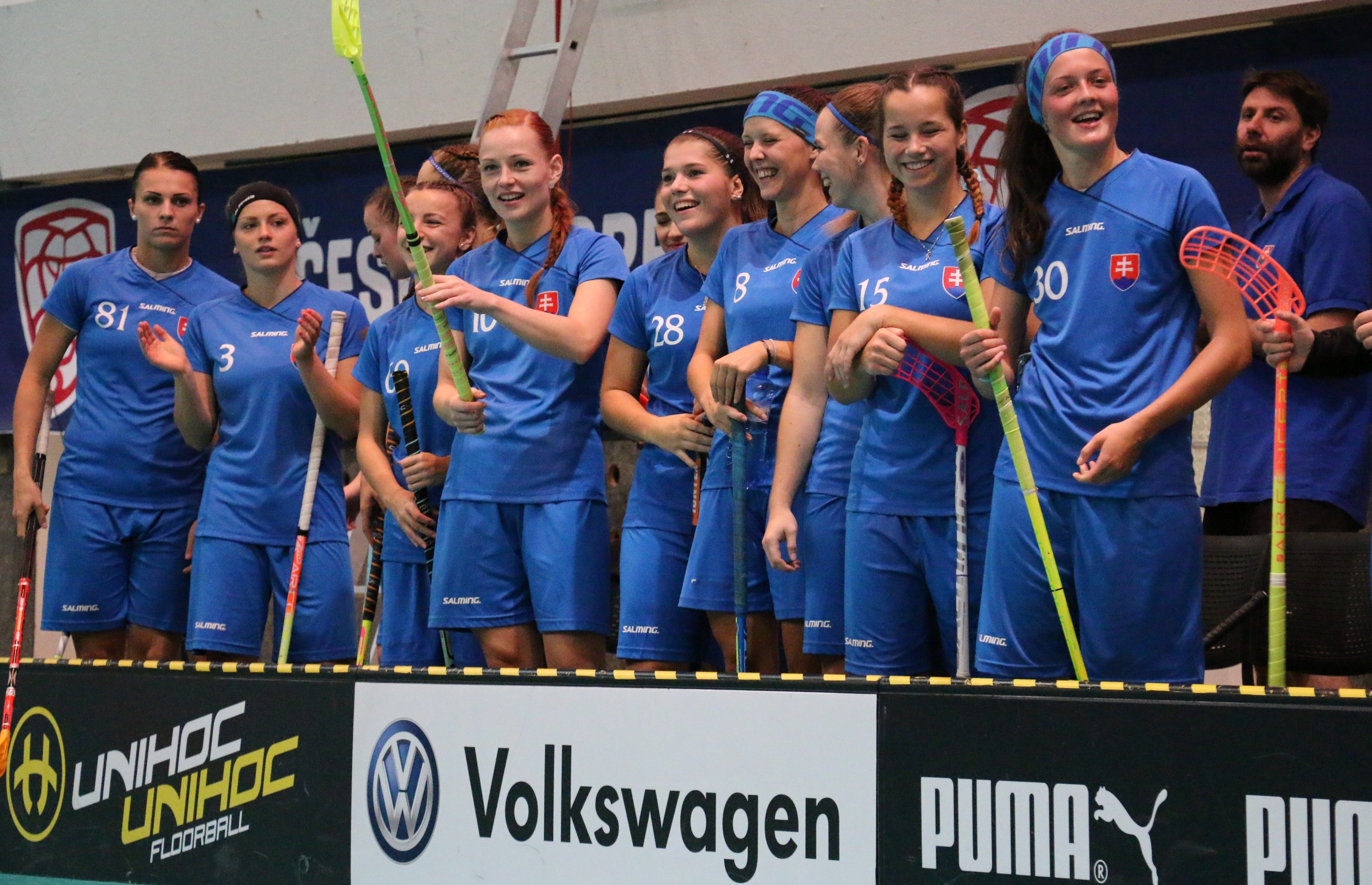
Slovakia national team players in friendly match in 2017

Year	Position	GP	W	D	L	GF	GA	+/-
2007 (Denmark)	In B Division							
2009 (Sweden)	In B Division							
2011 (Switzerland)	12th	5	1	0	4	19	34	–15
2013 (Czech Republic)	9th	6	5	0	1	44	14	+30
2015 (Finland)	8th	7	4	0	3	40	28	+12
2017 (Slovakia)	5th	7	6	0	1	65	23	+42
2019 (Switzerland)	6th	7	3	0	4	33	67	–34
2021 (Sweden)	6th	7	3	0	4	40	49	–9
2023 (Singapore)	5th	7	4	0	3	37	50	–13
2025 (Czech Republic)								
Total:		46	26	0	20	278	265	+13

== World championships results against other teams ==
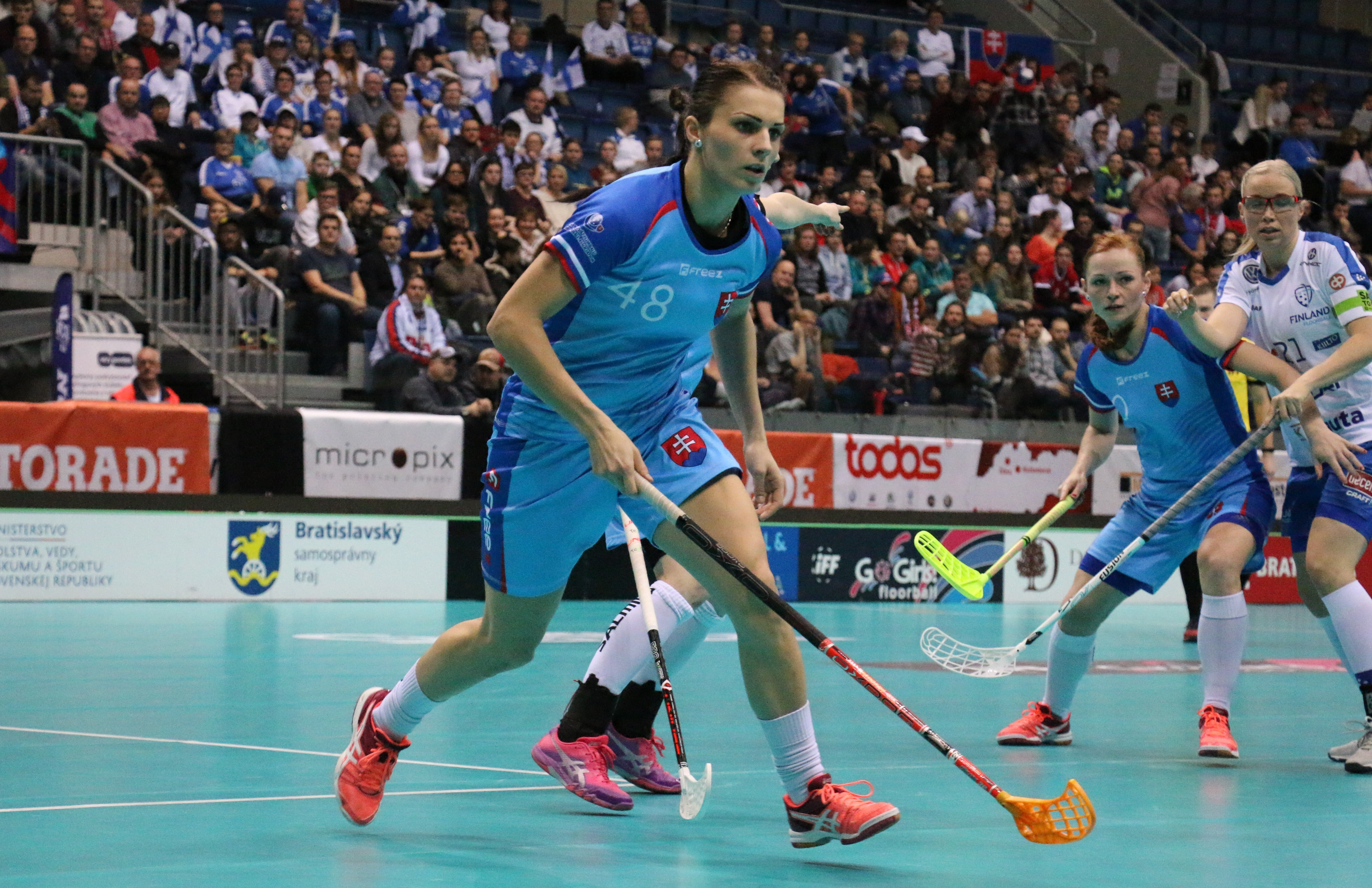
Slovakia national team players (in blue) at 2017 World Championships

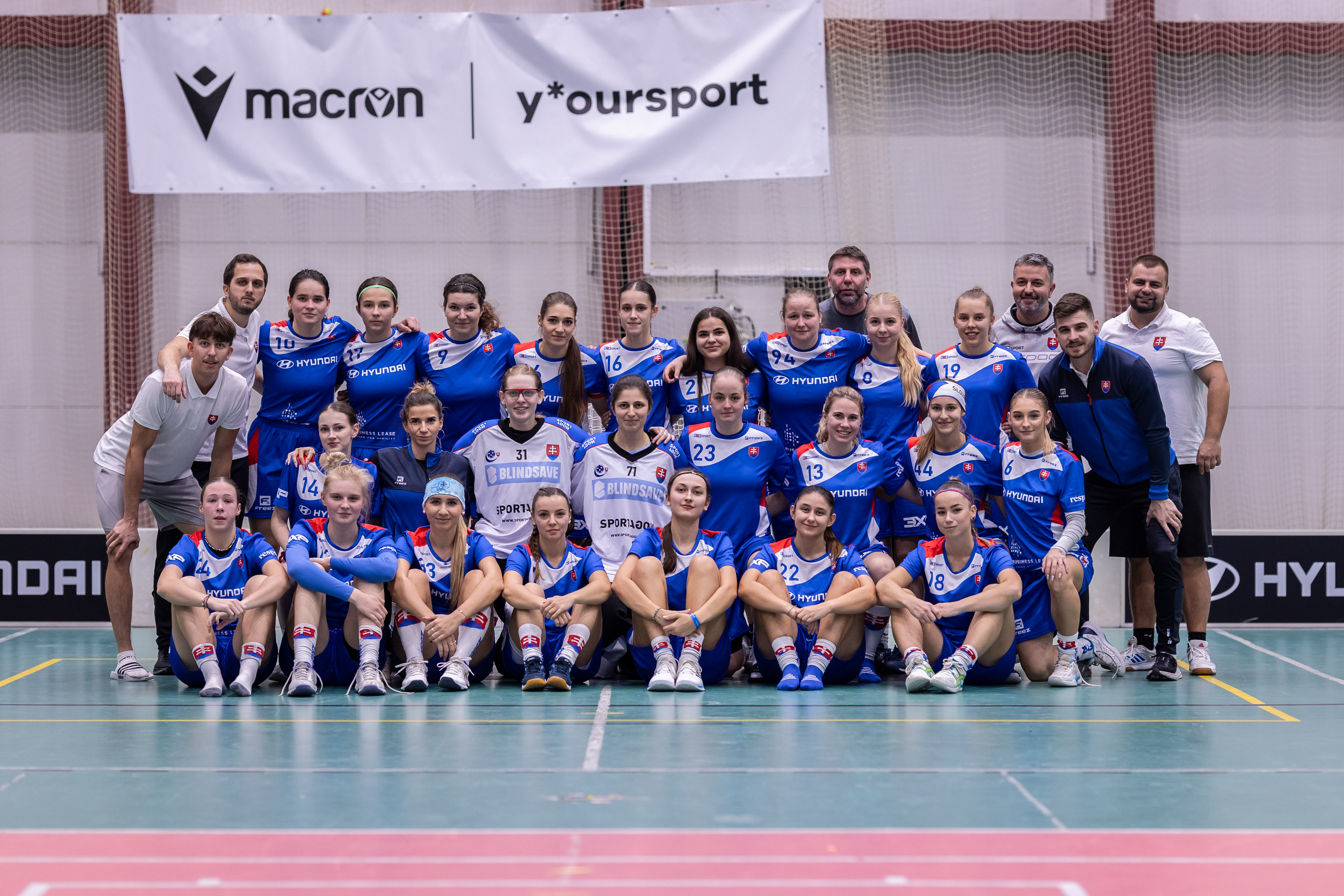
Slovakia national team in 2024

Team	GP	W	D	L	GF	GA	GD	BW	BD
Australia	2	2	0	0	28	3	+26	21–1	
Czech Republic	2	0	0	2	4	33	–29		3–19
Denmark	2	2	0	0	10	6	+4	6–3	
Estonia	1	1	0	0	10	3	+7	10–3	
Finland	2	0	0	2	8	14	–6		2–6
Germany	3	2	0	1	16	8	+8	6–1	3–4
Hungary	2	2	0	0	21	5	+16	11–1	
Latvia	4	2	0	2	19	17	+2	7–5	3–4
Netherlands	1	1	0	0	13	1	+12	13–1	
Norway	3	2	0	1	13	11	+2	7–4	2–5
Poland	2	0	0	2	4	10	–6		4–8
Russia	2	2	0	0	10	6	+4	6–4	
Singapore	1	1	0	0	12	2	+10	12–2	
South Korea	1	1	0	0	13	0	+13	13–0	
Sweden	2	0	0	2	2	38	–36		1–23
United States	2	1	0	1	18	8	+10	15–2	3–6

== Gallery ==
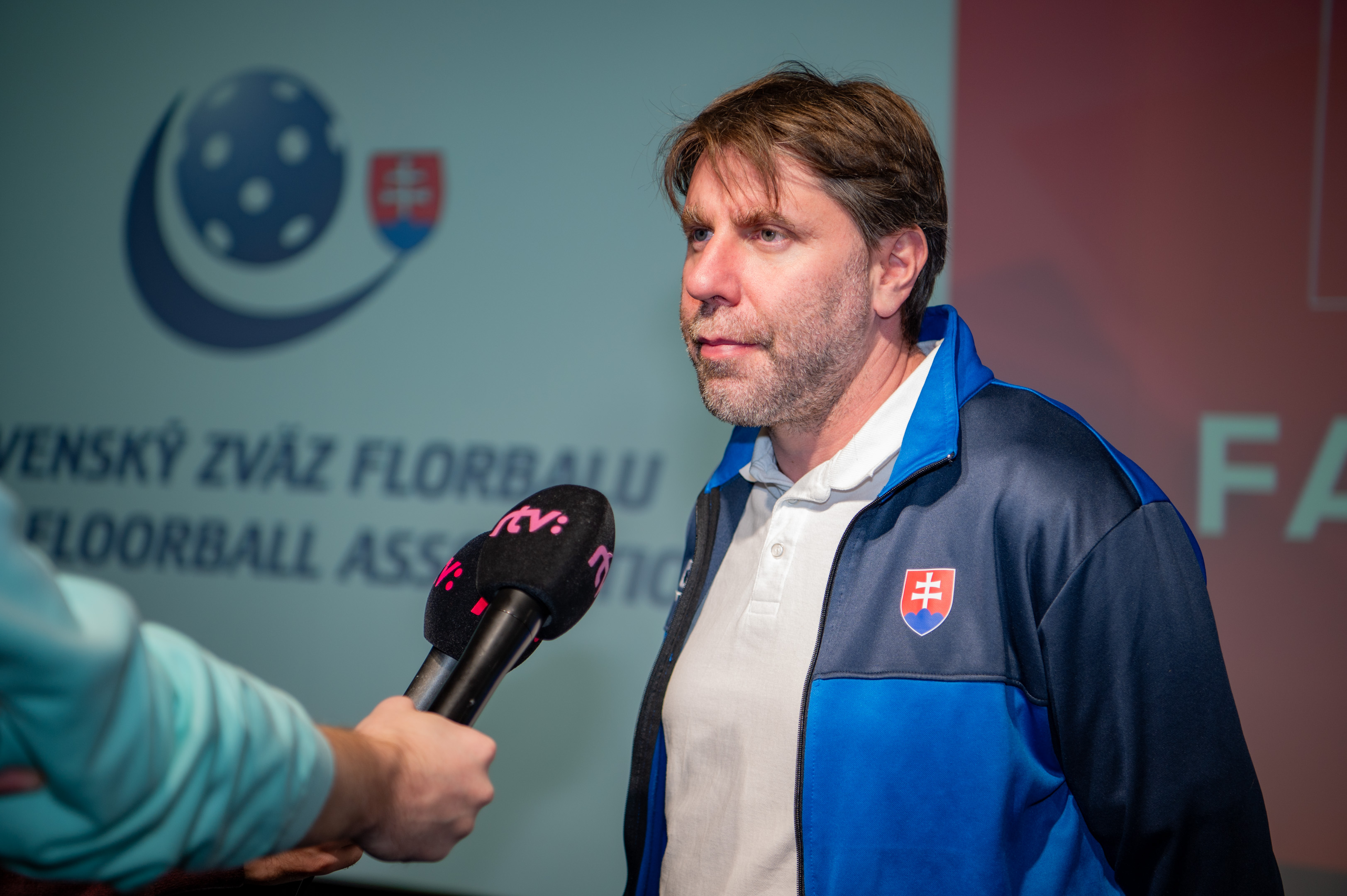
Coach of the Slovakia national team between 2016 and 2026 Michal Jedlička

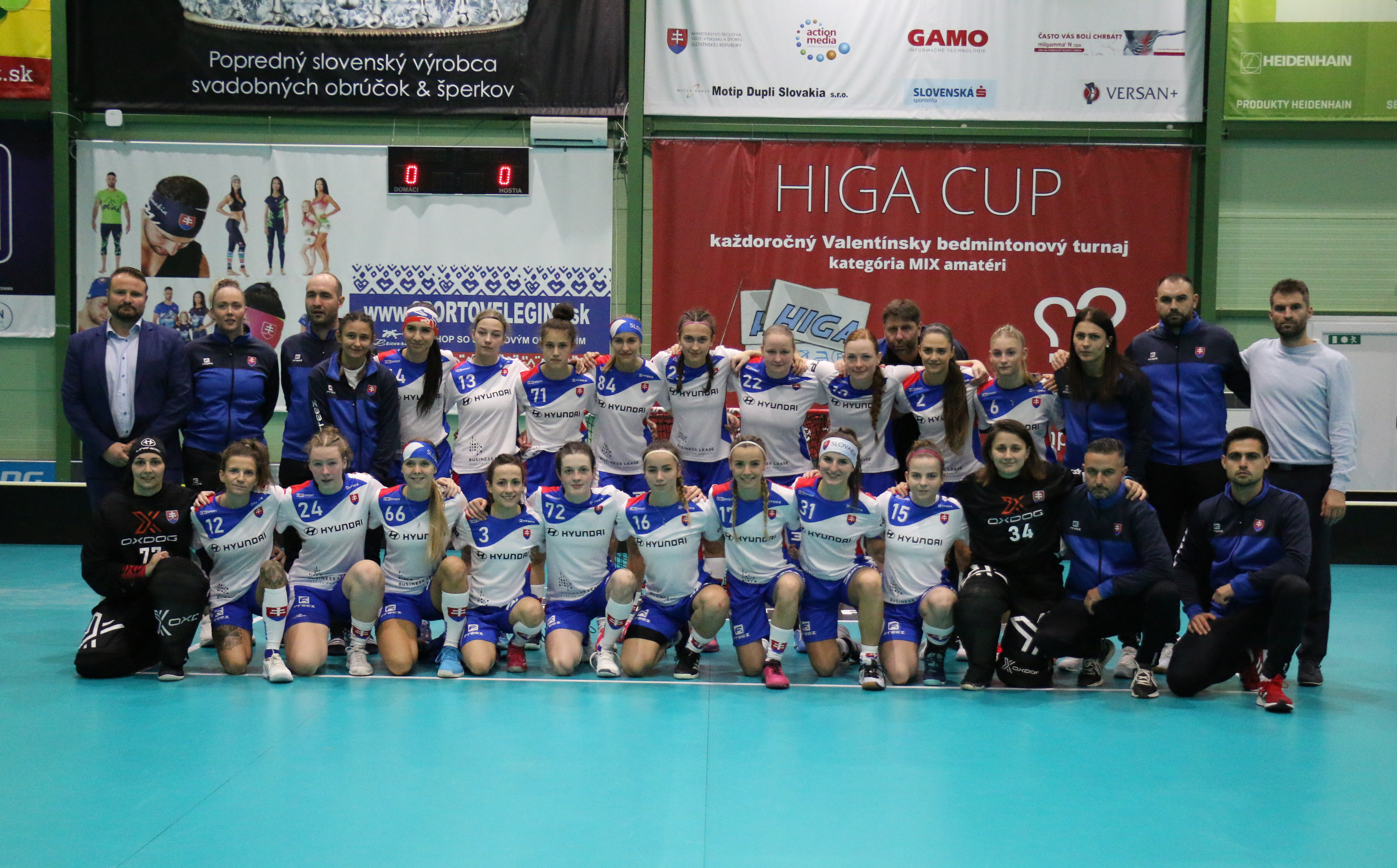
Slovakia national team in 2019

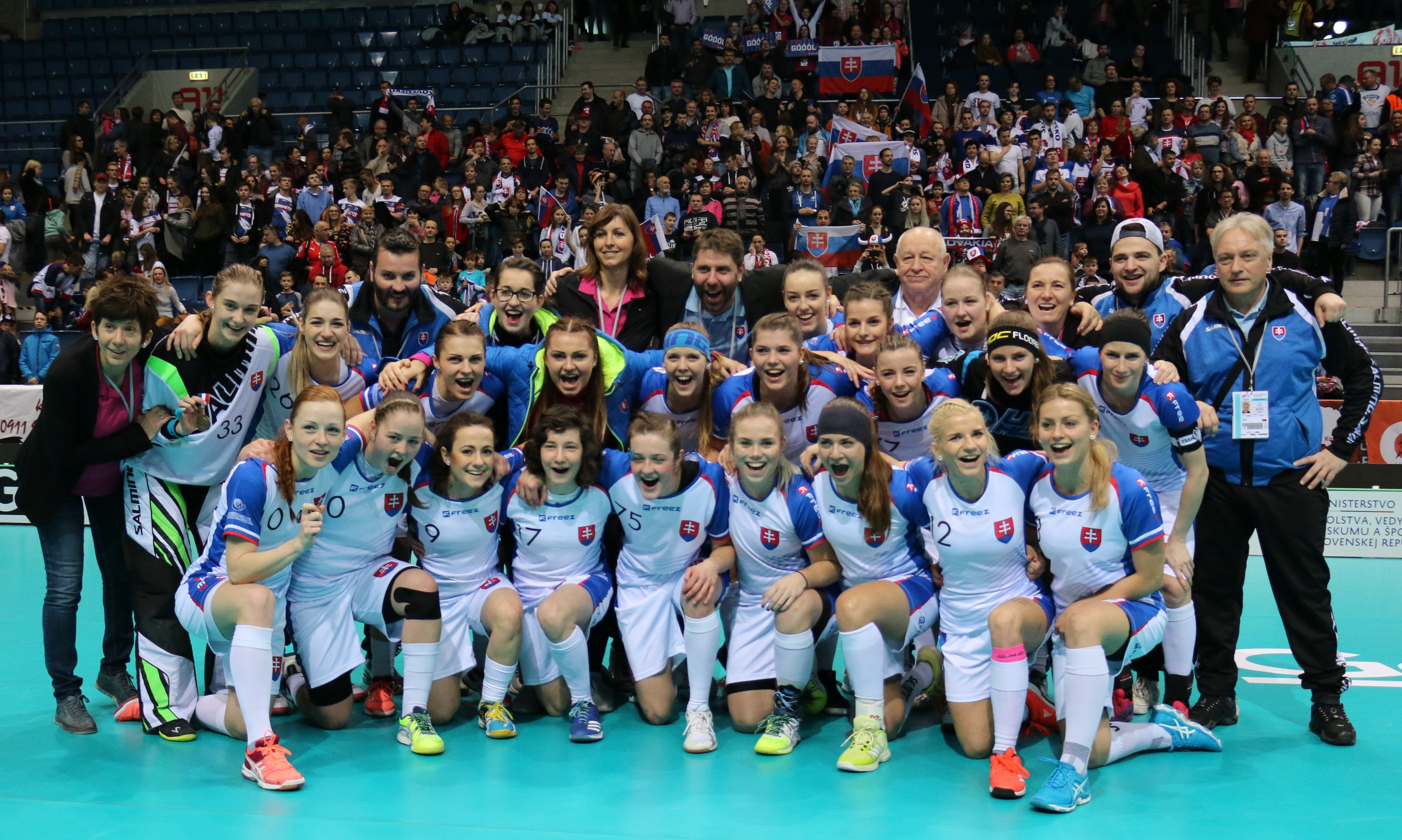
Slovakia national team at 2017 World Championships

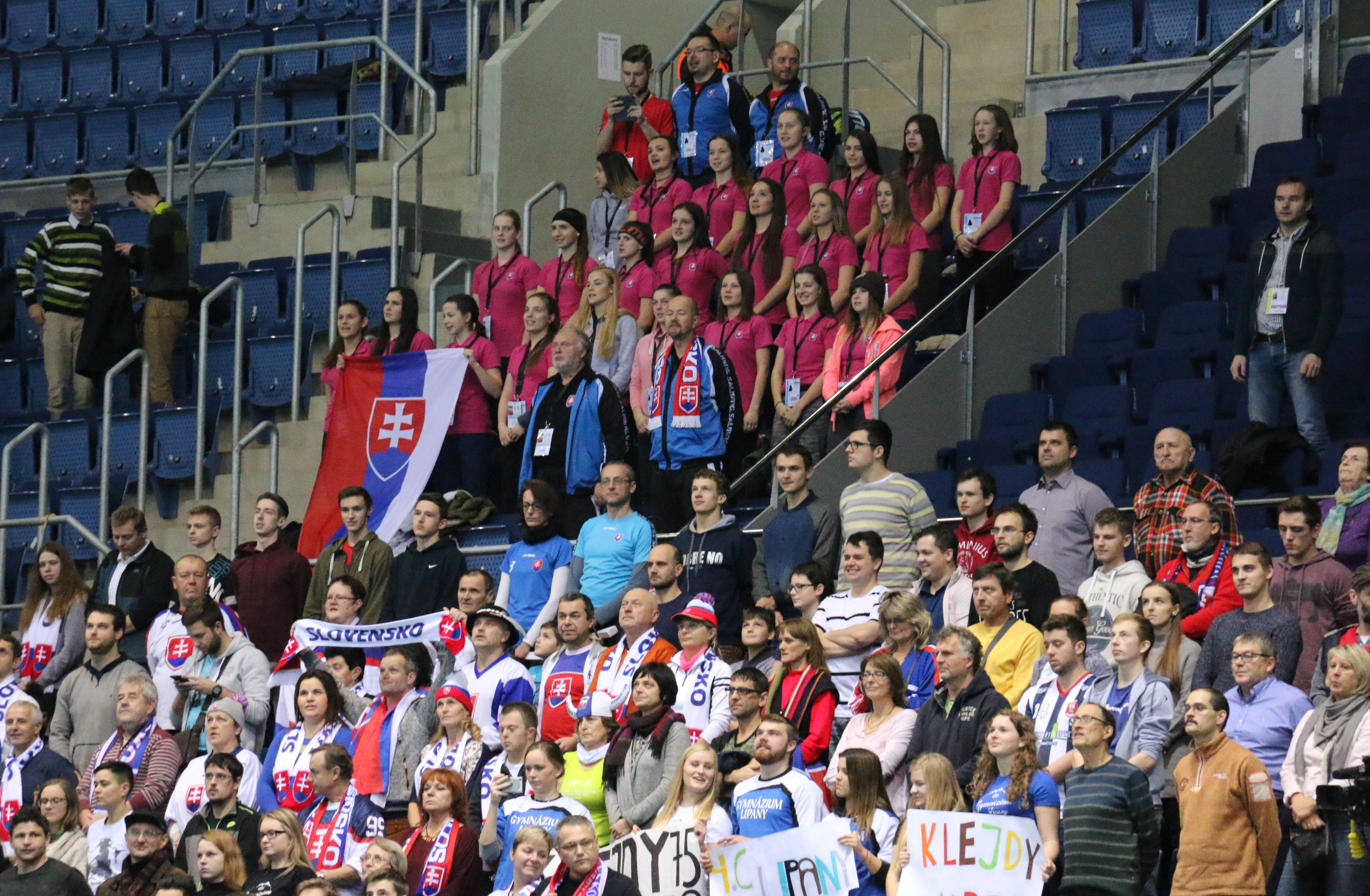
Slovakia national team supporters at 2017 World Championships

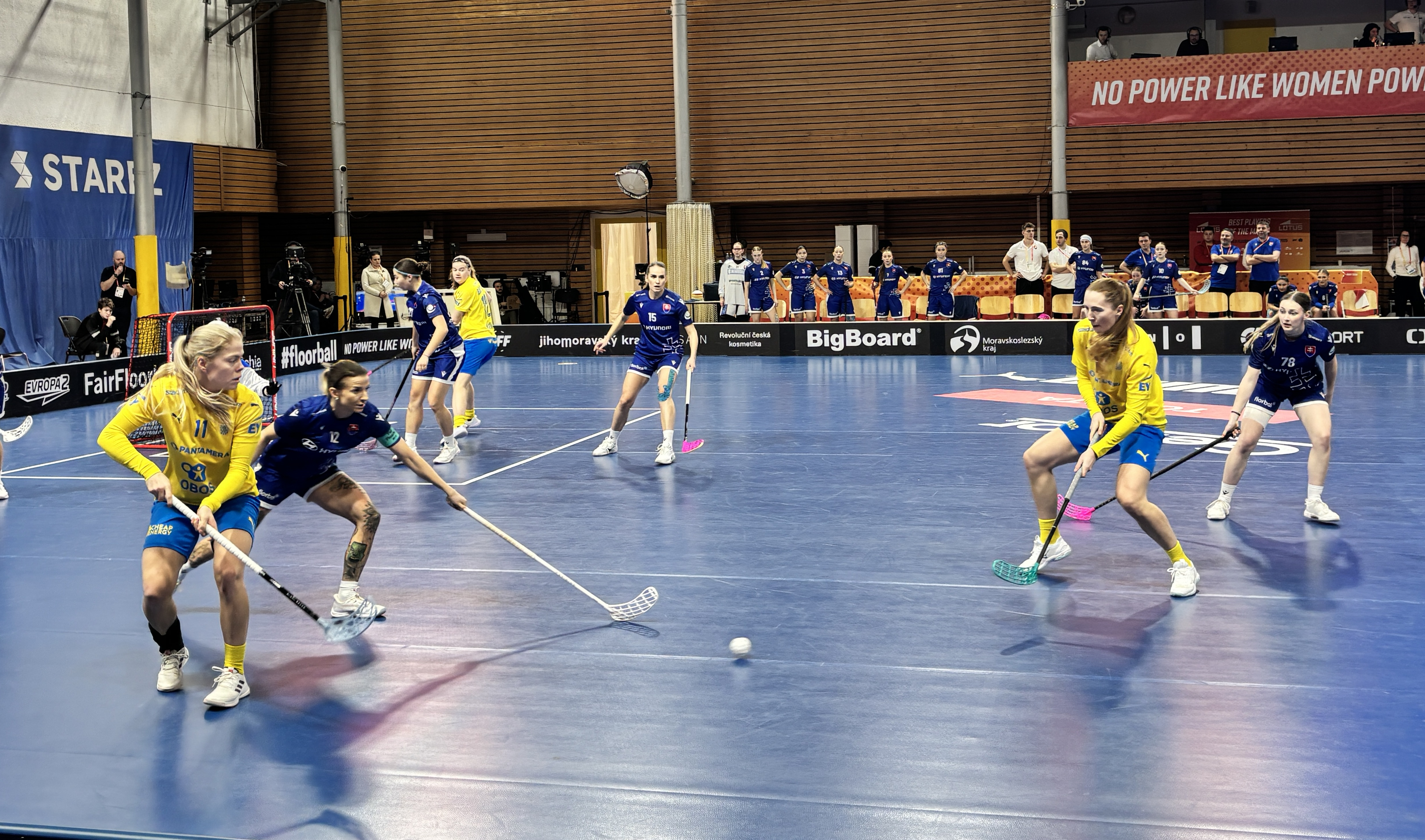
Slovakia national team (in blue) at 2025 World Championships

== See also ==
- Slovakia men's national floorball team
- Slovakia women's national under-19 floorball team
- Slovakia men's national under-19 floorball team
