= Italy women's national floorball team =

Italy women's national floorball team is the national team of Italy. At the 2003 Floorball Women's World Championship in Germany, the team finished fourth in the B-Division. At the 2007 Floorball Women's World Championship in Frederikshavn, Denmark, the team finished eighth in the B-Division.
