= Austria women's national floorball team =

The Austria women's national floorball team is an Austrian national sports team that plays floorball.

== Championship performance ==
At the 1997 Floorball Women's World Championship in Godby and Mariehamn, Åland, Finland, the Austria women's national floorball team finished ninth.

At the 1999 Floorball Women's World Championship in Borlänge, Sweden, the team finished first in the B-Division and elevated to the A-Division.

At the 2001 Floorball Women's World Championship in Riga, Latvia, the team finished eighth in the A-Division and were relegated to the B-Division.

At the 2003 Floorball Women's World Championship in Germany, the team finished seventh in the B-Division.

The team participated in the Qualification to the B-Division for the 2009 Floorball Women's World Championship. The qualifiers were held in Idrija, Slovenia. The team did not advance out of qualifiers.

In January 2025 the team will travel to Latvia for the World Cup qualification, this time ranked fifth in the A-Division.
