= 2015 Women's World Floorball Championships qualifying =

Floorball competition

The qualifying for the 2015 Women's World Floorball Championships was played in January and February 2015. A total of 23 teams competed for fifteen spots. The final tournament will be organized by Finland in December 2015.

== Overview ==
Numbers in brackets show the ranking before the qualification started, which is based on results from the last two World Championships.

| Europe 1 | Europe 2 | Europe 3 | Asia/Oceania | Americas |
|---|---|---|---|---|
| Sweden (1); Poland (7); Germany (8); Netherlands (14); Estonia (18) | Switzerland (3); Latvia (6); Denmark (9); Hungary (13); Spain (19); France (—)* | Czech Republic (4); Norway (5); Russia (10); Slovakia (11); Italy (23); Great Britain (27) | Australia (12); Japan (15); Singapore (20); New Zealand (—)* | United States (16); Canada (17) |

* Teams listed without a ranking are participating in their first Women´s World Floorball Championships and will receive a ranking after the final round event is played.

== Europe ==
The qualification rules are as follows:

- The three best teams from each qualification group will qualify
- The two best fourth placed teams will qualify
  - The classification of the fourth teams will follow this order:
    - 1. Average number of points
    - 2. Average goal difference
    - 3. Average scored goals
    - 4. Lottery drawing

=== European Qualification 1 ===
Dates: 4 – 8 February 2015
Venue: Hala UAM Morasko, Poznań, Poland

| Team | Pld | W | D | L | GF | GA | GD | Pts |
|---|---|---|---|---|---|---|---|---|
| Sweden | 4 | 4 | 0 | 0 | 60 | 5 | +55 | 8 |
| Poland | 4 | 3 | 0 | 1 | 27 | 12 | +15 | 6 |
| Germany | 4 | 2 | 0 | 2 | 10 | 26 | −16 | 4 |
| Netherlands | 4 | 1 | 0 | 3 | 9 | 38 | −29 | 2 |
| Estonia | 4 | 0 | 0 | 4 | 7 | 32 | −25 | 0 |

=== European Qualification 2 ===
Dates: 3 – 7 February 2015
Venue: Vidzeme´s Olympic Centre, Valmiera, Latvia

| Team | Pld | W | D | L | GF | GA | GD | Pts |
|---|---|---|---|---|---|---|---|---|
| Switzerland | 5 | 5 | 0 | 0 | 94 | 3 | +91 | 10 |
| Latvia | 5 | 3 | 1 | 1 | 33 | 12 | +21 | 7 |
| Denmark | 5 | 3 | 1 | 1 | 28 | 26 | +2 | 7 |
| Hungary | 5 | 1 | 1 | 3 | 17 | 40 | −23 | 3 |
| Spain | 5 | 1 | 1 | 3 | 11 | 41 | −30 | 3 |
| France | 5 | 0 | 0 | 5 | 1 | 62 | −61 | 0 |

=== European Qualification 3 ===
Dates: 4 – 8 February 2015
Venue: Arena Klokocina, Nitra, Slovakia

| Team | Pld | W | D | L | GF | GA | GD | Pts |
|---|---|---|---|---|---|---|---|---|
| Czech Republic | 5 | 5 | 0 | 0 | 55 | 8 | +47 | 10 |
| Slovakia | 5 | 4 | 0 | 1 | 42 | 11 | +31 | 8 |
| Norway | 5 | 3 | 0 | 2 | 37 | 15 | +22 | 6 |
| Russia | 5 | 2 | 0 | 3 | 29 | 21 | +8 | 4 |
| Italy | 5 | 1 | 0 | 4 | 12 | 51 | −39 | 2 |
| Great Britain | 5 | 0 | 0 | 5 | 2 | 71 | −69 | 0 |

=== Ranking of fourth-placed teams ===
Since the number of teams between the qualification groups differ, the group sizes will be equalised by removing the results from the matches against the lowest placed teams in the larger-sized group before comparing the average results. The calculation of the fourth-placed teams will follow this order: 1. Average number of points 2. Average goal difference 3. Average scored goals 4. Lottery drawing.

| Team | Pld | W | D | L | GF | GA | GD | Pts |
|---|---|---|---|---|---|---|---|---|
| Russia | 4 | 1 | 0 | 3 | 14 | 20 | −6 | 2 |
| Netherlands | 4 | 1 | 0 | 3 | 9 | 38 | −29 | 2 |
| Hungary | 4 | 0 | 1 | 3 | 8 | 40 | −32 | 1 |

== Asia–Oceania ==
The qualification rules are as follows:

- The three best teams from the qualification group will qualify

Dates: 23 – 25 January 2015
Venue: Cardinia Life Arena, Pakenham, Australia

| Team | Pld | W | D | L | GF | GA | GD | Pts |
|---|---|---|---|---|---|---|---|---|
| Japan | 3 | 3 | 0 | 0 | 13 | 7 | +6 | 6 |
| Singapore | 3 | 2 | 0 | 1 | 18 | 7 | +11 | 4 |
| Australia | 3 | 1 | 0 | 2 | 16 | 15 | +1 | 2 |
| New Zealand | 3 | 0 | 0 | 3 | 1 | 19 | −18 | 0 |

== Americas ==
The qualification rules are as follows:

- The best team from the qualification group will qualify

The calculation of the best team will follow this order: 1. Average number of points 2. Average goal difference 3. Average scored goals 4. Extra time + penalty shots.

Dates: 6 – 7 February 2015
Venue: Cornell Community Centre, Markham, Canada

| Team | Pld | W | D | L | GF | GA | GD | Pts |
|---|---|---|---|---|---|---|---|---|
| United States | 2 | 2 | 0 | 0 | 11 | 5 | +6 | 4 |
| Canada | 2 | 0 | 0 | 2 | 5 | 11 | −6 | 0 |
