= Floorball at the 2025 World Games =

- Venue: Xindu Xiangcheng Sports Centre
- Dates: 6–13 August 2025
- No. of events: 2
- Competitors: 16 teams from 11 nations

The floorball competition at the 2025 World Games took place in Chengdu, China. Both a men's and women's tournaments were held, with the women's tournament taking place for the first time.

== Qualification ==
=== Qualification summary ===
| Nation | Men's | Women's |
|---|---|---|
| Canada | Yes | Yes |
| China | Yes | |
| Czech Republic | Yes | Yes |
| Finland | Yes | Yes |
| Latvia | Yes | |
| Philippines | Yes | |
| Singapore | | Yes |
| Slovakia | | Yes |
| Sweden | Yes | Yes |
| Switzerland | Yes | Yes |
| Thailand | | Yes |
| Total: 11 NOCs | 8 | 8 |

=== Men's ===
The men's tournament automatically included the host nation China, for which it was the debut at a major international tournament. Other countries qualified based on their placement at the 2024 World Championship. From there, the five best European teams and the best Asia–Oceania team from the main tournament advanced, along with the only automatically qualified team from the Americas.

=== Women's ===
Five European teams qualified for the women's tournament based on their results at the 2023 World Championships. The United States and Canada competed for qualification in a tournament held from 2 to 4 August 2024 in Fredericton, Canada. In addition, the top two teams from the Asia–Oceania qualification for the 2025 World Championships, held from 18 to 22 March 2025, advanced to the World Games.

== Medallists ==
| Event | Gold | Silver | Bronze |
|---|---|---|---|
| Men's tournament | Sweden: Jon Hedlund; Filip Wramdemark; Malte Lundmark; Albin Sjögren; Oskar Weissbach; Hampus Nydenfeldt; Filip Eriksson; Sakarias Ulriksson; Linus Holmgren; Oscar Magnusson Lindholm; Niklas Ramirez; Oskar Hovlund; Emil Kalentun; Måns Parsjö | Finland: Eemeli Salin; Oskari Heikkilä; Juho Repo; Eemeli Akola; Miska Mäkinen; Markus Laakso; Joona Rantala; Luukas Hyvärinen; Sami Johansson; Juuso Ahola; Otto Lehkosuo; Alpo Laitila; Waltteri Vesterinen; Oskari Fäldén | Czech Republic: Lukáš Punčochář; Filip Zakonov; Adam Hemerka; Adam Zubek; Marek Beneš; Matěj Havlas; Ondřej Němeček; Tomáš Hanák; Tomáš Jurco; Jakub Buršík; Adam Delong; Filip Langer; Josef Rýpar; Lukáš Bauer |
| Women's tournament | Finland: Alma Laitila; Daniela Westerlund; Suvi Hämäläinen; Ulla Valtola; Sofia Mittentag; Oona Kauppi; Veera Kauppi; Milla Nordlund; Emilia Pietilä; Natalia Pitkäkangas; Julia Saarinen; My Kippilä; Jenna Saario; Miia Maaranen | Sweden: Ellen Rasmussen; Maja Viström; Wilma Johansson; Matilda Lindgren; Mira Markström; Nellie Ögren; Ida Sundberg; Emelie Wibron; Moa Andersson; Frida Görtz; Lisa Carlsson; Hanna Nordstrand; Lovisa Hedin; Ellen Lundin | Switzerland: Ladina Tondury; Naja Ritter; Laila Ediz; Céline Stettler; Seraina Fitzi; Doris Berger; Isabelle Gerig; Norina Reusser; Nina Metzger; Marcia Wick; Linn Larsson; Anja Wyss; Lara Heini; Chiara Gredig |

Source: 1, 2

== Results ==
=== Men's tournament ===
==== Preliminary round ====
===== Group A =====
| Pos | Team | Pld | W | D | L | GF | GA | GD | Pts | Qualification |
|---|---|---|---|---|---|---|---|---|---|---|
| 1 | Sweden | 3 | 3 | 0 | 0 | 26 | 3 | +23 | 6 | Semifinals |
| 2 | Switzerland | 3 | 2 | 0 | 1 | 23 | 11 | +12 | 4 | Semifinals |
| 3 | Latvia | 3 | 1 | 0 | 2 | 16 | 13 | +3 | 2 | Fifth place game |
| 4 | Philippines | 3 | 0 | 0 | 3 | 3 | 41 | −38 | 0 | Seventh place game |

Source: TWG 2025

===== Group B =====
| Pos | Team | Pld | W | D | L | GF | GA | GD | Pts | Qualification |
|---|---|---|---|---|---|---|---|---|---|---|
| 1 | Finland | 3 | 3 | 0 | 0 | 74 | 3 | +71 | 6 | Semifinals |
| 2 | Czech Republic | 3 | 2 | 0 | 1 | 67 | 9 | +58 | 4 | Semifinals |
| 3 | Canada | 3 | 1 | 0 | 2 | 17 | 54 | −37 | 2 | Fifth place game |
| 4 | China (H) | 3 | 0 | 0 | 3 | 1 | 93 | −92 | 0 | Seventh place game |

Source: TWG 2025
(H) Hosts

==== Final round ====
Semifinals
11 August
Sweden (ET) | 5
Czech Republic | 4
11 August
Finland | 4
Switzerland | 0

Final
13 August
Sweden | 2
Finland | 1
Third place
13 August
Czech Republic | 7
Switzerland | 2

=== Women's tournament ===
==== Preliminary round ====
===== Group A =====
| Pos | Team | Pld | W | D | L | GF | GA | GD | Pts | Qualification |
|---|---|---|---|---|---|---|---|---|---|---|
| 1 | Sweden | 3 | 3 | 0 | 0 | 43 | 9 | +34 | 6 | Semifinals |
| 2 | Switzerland | 3 | 2 | 0 | 1 | 30 | 10 | +20 | 4 | Semifinals |
| 3 | Slovakia | 3 | 1 | 0 | 2 | 20 | 23 | −3 | 2 | Fifth place game |
| 4 | Thailand | 3 | 0 | 0 | 3 | 3 | 54 | −51 | 0 | Seventh place game |

Source: TWG 2025

===== Group B =====
| Pos | Team | Pld | W | D | L | GF | GA | GD | Pts | Qualification |
|---|---|---|---|---|---|---|---|---|---|---|
| 1 | Finland | 3 | 3 | 0 | 0 | 59 | 2 | +57 | 6 | Semifinals |
| 2 | Czech Republic | 3 | 2 | 0 | 1 | 39 | 3 | +36 | 4 | Semifinals |
| 3 | Singapore | 3 | 1 | 0 | 2 | 14 | 42 | −28 | 2 | Fifth place game |
| 4 | Canada | 3 | 0 | 0 | 3 | 1 | 66 | −65 | 0 | Seventh place game |

Source: TWG 2025

==== Final round ====
Semifinals
11 August
Sweden | 3
Czech Republic | 1
11 August
Finland | 5
Switzerland | 1

Final
13 August
Sweden | 2
Finland | 3
Third place
13 August
Czech Republic | 3
Switzerland | 4

== Ranking ==
=== Men ===
| Rank | Team | M | GF | GA | GD |
|---|---|---|---|---|---|
| 1st place, gold medalist(s) | Sweden | 5–0 | 33 | 8 | +25 |
| 2nd place, silver medalist(s) | Finland | 4–1 | 79 | 5 | +74 |
| 3rd place, bronze medalist(s) | Czech Republic | 3–2 | 78 | 16 | +61 |
| 4 | Switzerland | 2–3 | 25 | 22 | +3 |
| 5 | Latvia | 2–2 | 28 | 16 | +12 |
| 6 | Canada | 1–3 | 20 | 66 | -46 |
| 7 | Philippines | 1–3 | 17 | 41 | -24 |
| 8 | China | 0–4 | 1 | 107 | -106 |

=== Women ===
| Rank | Team | M | GF | GA | GD |
|---|---|---|---|---|---|
| 1st place, gold medalist(s) | Finland | 5–0 | 67 | 5 | +62 |
| 2nd place, silver medalist(s) | Sweden | 4–1 | 54 | 13 | +41 |
| 3rd place, bronze medalist(s) | Switzerland | 3–2 | 35 | 18 | +17 |
| 4 | Czech Republic | 2–3 | 43 | 10 | +33 |
| 5 | Slovakia | 2–2 | 33 | 25 | +8 |
| 6 | Singapore | 1–3 | 16 | 55 | -39 |
| 7 | Thailand | 1–3 | 10 | 58 | -48 |
| 8 | Canada | 0–4 | 5 | 73 | -68 |
