= Floorball at the 2025 World Games – Women's tournament =

2024 Floorball at the 2025 World Games (Women's tournament)
Tournament details
- Host country: China
- Venue: 1 (in 1 host city)
- Dates: 6 – 13 August
- Teams: 8

Final positions
- Champions: Finland
- Runners-up: Sweden
- Third place: Switzerland

The women's floorball tournament at the 2025 World Games was women's floorball tournament at the World Games, held from 6 to 13 August 2025 as part of the 2025 World Games in Chengdu, China. This marks the first time a women's tournament was held since the floorball tournaments for the 2017 and 2022 World Games were only for men.

Finland won the tournament after defeating Sweden in the final. It was the first time since the 2001 World Championships, where Finland also won, that Sweden did not win a major tournament. In the third-place match, Switzerland defeated the Czech Republic.

As in the previous men's tournaments at World Games, team rosters were limited to 14 players. Matches were shortened to three 15-minute periods (instead of the standard 20 minutes).

== Qualification ==
Five European teams qualified for the women's tournament based on their results at the 2023 World Championships. The United States and Canada competed for qualification in a tournament held from 2 to 4 August 2024 in Fredericton, Canada. In addition, the top two teams from the Asia–Oceania qualification for the 2025 World Championships, held from 18 to 22 March 2025, advanced to the World Games. Thailand also qualified for the World Games through the World Championship qualification, although it had withdrawn from the championship itself.

| Qualification method | Date | Venue | Berths | Qualified team |
|---|---|---|---|---|
| European qualification – 2023 World Championships | 2–10 December 2023 | Singapore | 5 | Sweden |
| European qualification – 2023 World Championships | 2–10 December 2023 | Singapore | 5 | Finland |
| European qualification – 2023 World Championships | 2–10 December 2023 | Singapore | 5 | Czech Republic |
| European qualification – 2023 World Championships | 2–10 December 2023 | Singapore | 5 | Switzerland |
| European qualification – 2023 World Championships | 2–10 December 2023 | Singapore | 5 | Slovakia |
| Americas qualification | 2–4 August 2024 | (Canada) Fredericton | 1 | Canada |
| Asian–Oceanian qualification – 2025 World Championships qualification | 18–23 March 2025 | Singapore | 2 | Singapore |
| Asian–Oceanian qualification – 2025 World Championships qualification | 18–23 March 2025 | Singapore | 2 | Thailand |
| Total | | | 8 | |

== Tournament format ==
In the group stage, teams played each other from 6 to 10 August 2025. The top two teams from each group advanced to a two-round play-off held between 11 and 13 August, while the remaining teams played for placement.

== Preliminary round ==
=== Group A ===
| Pos | Team | Pld | W | D | L | GF | GA | GD | Pts | Qualification |
|---|---|---|---|---|---|---|---|---|---|---|
| 1 | Sweden | 3 | 3 | 0 | 0 | 43 | 9 | +34 | 6 | Semifinals |
| 2 | Switzerland | 3 | 2 | 0 | 1 | 30 | 10 | +20 | 4 | Semifinals |
| 3 | Slovakia | 3 | 1 | 0 | 2 | 20 | 23 | −3 | 2 | Fifth place game |
| 4 | Thailand | 3 | 0 | 0 | 3 | 3 | 54 | −51 | 0 | Seventh place game |

Source: TWG 2025

| 6 August 2025; 09:00 | Thailand | 2–21 (1–6, 0–9, 1–6) | Sweden | Xindu Xiangcheng Sports Centre, Chengdu |

Game reference
| Alexandra Muller, Supasuta Thiptha | Goalies | Frida Görtz | Referees: (Switzerland) Christian Friemel (Switzerland) Erik Hesselberg |

| 7 August 2025; 11:15 | Switzerland | 8–2 (2–0, 2–1, 4–1) | Slovakia | Xindu Xiangcheng Sports Centre, Chengdu |

Game reference

| 8 August 2025; 15:00 | Switzerland | 19–1 (9–0, 4–1, 6–0) | Thailand | Xindu Xiangcheng Sports Centre, Chengdu |

Game reference

| 9 August 2025; 09:30 | Slovakia | 14–0 (6–0, 6–0, 2–0) | Thailand | Xindu Xiangcheng Sports Centre, Chengdu |

Game reference

| 9 August 2025; 15:00 | Sweden | 7–3 (3–2, 0–0, 4–1) | Switzerland | Xindu Xiangcheng Sports Centre, Chengdu |

Game reference

| 10 August 2025; 11:45 | Sweden | 15–4 (5–0, 2–1, 8–3) | Slovakia | Xindu Xiangcheng Sports Centre, Chengdu |

Game reference

=== Group B ===
| Pos | Team | Pld | W | D | L | GF | GA | GD | Pts | Qualification |
|---|---|---|---|---|---|---|---|---|---|---|
| 1 | Finland | 3 | 3 | 0 | 0 | 59 | 2 | +57 | 6 | Semifinals |
| 2 | Czech Republic | 3 | 2 | 0 | 1 | 39 | 3 | +36 | 4 | Semifinals |
| 3 | Singapore | 3 | 1 | 0 | 2 | 14 | 42 | −28 | 2 | Fifth place game |
| 4 | Canada | 3 | 0 | 0 | 3 | 1 | 66 | −65 | 0 | Seventh place game |

Source: TWG 2025

| 6 August 2025; 15:45 | Finland | 36–0 (14–0, 12–0, 10–0) | Canada | Xindu Xiangcheng Sports Centre, Chengdu |

Game reference

| 6 August 2025; 20:15 | Czech Republic | 21–0 (5–0, 8–0, 8–0) | Singapore | Xindu Xiangcheng Sports Centre, Chengdu |

Game reference

| 8 August 2025; 09:30 | Czech Republic | 16–0 (7–0, 8–0, 1–0) | Canada | Xindu Xiangcheng Sports Centre, Chengdu |

Game reference

| 8 August 2025; 19:30 | Singapore | 0–20 (0–5, 0–11, 0–4) | Finland | Xindu Xiangcheng Sports Centre, Chengdu |

Game reference

| 9 August 2025; 17:15 | Finland | 3–2 (0–1, 1–1, 2–0) | Czech Republic | Xindu Xiangcheng Sports Centre, Chengdu |

Game reference

| 10 August 2025; 09:30 | Canada | 1–14 (0–4, 0–3, 1–7) | Singapore | Xindu Xiangcheng Sports Centre, Chengdu |

Game reference

== Final round ==
Semifinals
11 August
Sweden | 3
Czech Republic | 1
11 August
Finland | 5
Switzerland | 1

Final
13 August
Sweden | 2
Finland | 3
Third place
13 August
Czech Republic | 3
Switzerland | 4

=== Semifinals ===
| 11 August 2025; 10:30 | Sweden | 3–1 (1–1, 1–0, 1–0) | Czech Republic | Xindu Xiangcheng Sports Centre, Chengdu |

Game reference

| 11 August 2025; 16:30 | Finland | 5–1 (1–0, 2–0, 2–1) | Switzerland | Xindu Xiangcheng Sports Centre, Chengdu |

Game reference

=== Seventh place game ===
| 12 August 2025; 13:00 | Thailand | 7–4 (2–1, 2–2, 3–1) | Canada | Xindu Xiangcheng Sports Centre, Chengdu |

Game reference

=== Fifth place game ===
| 12 August 2025; 16:30 | Slovakia | 13–2 (2–0, 8–1, 3–1) | Singapore | Xindu Xiangcheng Sports Centre, Chengdu |

Game reference

=== Bronze medal game ===
| 13 August 2025; 11:30 | Czech Republic | 3–4 (1–1, 0–3, 2–0) | Switzerland | Xindu Xiangcheng Sports Centre, Chengdu |

Game reference

=== Gold medal game ===
| 13 August 2025; 17:45 | Sweden | 2–3 (0–0, 2–1, 0–2) | Finland | Xindu Xiangcheng Sports Centre, Chengdu |

Game reference

== Final ranking ==
| Rank | Team |
|---|---|
| 1st place, gold medalist(s) | Finland |
| 2nd place, silver medalist(s) | Sweden |
| 3rd place, bronze medalist(s) | Switzerland |
| 4 | Czech Republic |
| 5 | Slovakia |
| 6 | Singapore |
| 7 | Thailand |
| 8 | Canada |

== All-star team ==
Tournament all-star team:

- Best goalkeeper: (Finland) Miia Maaranen
- Best defenders: (Sweden) Moa Andersson, (Finland) Jenna Saario
- Best forwards: (Sweden) Wilma Johansson, (Finland) Veera Kauppi
- Best center: (Czech Republic) Vanessa Rebecca Keprtová

== See also ==
- Floorball at the 2025 World Games
  - Men's tournament
