= Canada women's national floorball team =

Canada Women's Floorball Team
- Nickname(s): Team Canada
- Founded: 2001
- Manager: Vanessa Carpenter
- Coach: Nicolas van Thielen
- First game: (Canada) 2-11 (Germany); 12 May 2007
- Largest win: (Canada) 13-2 (United States); 3 Aug 2024
- Largest defeat: (Canada) 0-36 (Finland); 6 Aug 2025
Home colors	Away colors

The Canada women's national floorball team is the women's national floorball team of Canada, and a member of the International Floorball Federation (IFF). Canada's women's team is currently unranked after failing to qualify for the last five Women's World Floorball Championships. Their 13th-place ranking after the 2013 Women's World Floorball Championships remains the highest ranking achieved by the women's team at the World Championships.

Canada's main rivals in women's floorball are the United States.

The Canada National Team is organized by Floorball Canada.

== Roster ==
As of the 2025 World Championship Qualifying

Goalkeepers
Number	Player name	Club
1	Ida Hudson	(Canada) Infinity Floorball
33	Ashley Norsworthy	(Canada) Hamilton FC

Defensemen
Number	Player name	Club
3	Reanne Curry	(Canada) Infinity Floorball
8	Emelie Blomqvist	(Sweden) Lindome IBK
9	Emma Murphy	(Canada) Infinity Floorball
13	Claire Wright	(Canada) Montreal FC
18	Rylee Bourgaize	(Canada) Ottawa Blizzard
22	Nicole Crosthwaite	(Canada) Toronto Floorball League

Forwards
Number	Player name	Club
2	Dana Isaacs	(United States) Oswego FC
5	Elise van Thielen	(Netherlands) Maastricht FC
6	Sara Alfheim	(Canada) Ottawa Blizzard
7	Sophie Pomeroy	(Canada) Infinity Floorball
15	Evaleena Adam	(Canada) Infinity Floorball
16	Sofia Holm	(Finland) IBF Blue Fox
20	Cassandra St. Denis	(Canada) Ottawa Blizzard
26	Emily Niskanen	(Canada) Infinity Floorball
27	Shirin Laeubli	(Switzerland) Floorball Uri
32	Jessica Crosthwaite	(Canada) Ottawa Blizzard
88	Jasmine McKnight	(Canada) Ottawa Blizzard
97	Meghan Jefferies	(Canada) Ottawa Blizzard

=== Team staff ===
- General manager – Vanessa Carpenter
- Head coach – Nicolas van Thielen
- Mental coach – Jennifer Ollis
- Team official – Cassandra St Denis

== Rankings and records ==
=== World rankings ===
Year	Rank	Details	Change
2023	Unranked	Failed to qualify	Steady
2021	Unranked	Qualification cancelled due to the COVID-19 pandemic	Steady
2019	Unranked	Failed to qualify	Steady
2017	Unranked	Failed to qualify	Steady
2015	Unranked	Failed to qualify	
2013	13th	13th Final Round	NEW
2011	Unranked	Failed to qualify	
2009	19th	9th B-Division	▼2
2007	17th	7th B-Division	NEW

=== All-time World Championship records ===
Year	GP	W	D	L	GF	GA	+/-
(Denmark) 2007 B-Division	5	1	2	2	26	38	-12
(Sweden) 2009 B-Division	5	1	0	4	10	43	-33
(Canada) 2011 Qualifying	2	0	0	2	2	16	-14
(Canada) 2013 Qualifying	2	2	0	0	9	5	+4
(Czech Republic) 2013 Final Round	5	3	0	2	24	34	-10
(Canada) 2015 Qualifying	2	0	0	2	5	11	-6
(Canada) 2017 Qualifying	2	0	1	1	11	15	-4
(United States) 2019 Qualifying	2	0	0	2	3	21	-18
(Canada) 2023 Qualifying	2	0	0	2	2	8	-6
(United States) 2025 Qualifying	3	1	0	2	14	18	-4
Totals	30	8	3	19	106	209	-103

=== Other international competitions ===
Year	GP	W	D	L	GF	GA	+/-
(Canada) 2025 World Games Qualifying	3	3	0	0	33	4	+29
(China) 2025 World Games	4	0	0	4	5	73	-68
Totals	3	3	0	0	33	4	+29

=== Head-to-head international records ===
Opponent	GP	W	D	L	GF	GA	+/-								
Thailand	1	0	0	1	4	7	-3								
Singapore	1	0	0	1	1	14	-13								
Czech Republic	1	0	0	1	0	16	-16								
Finland	1	0	0	1	0	36	-	Australia	1	0	1	0	6	6	0
Denmark	1	0	0	1	2	12	-10								
Estonia	1	0	0	1	1	12	-11								
Germany	3	0	0	3	4	32	-28								
Hungary	2	1	0	1	6	17	-11								
Italy	2	2	0	0	10	7	+3								
Japan	2	1	0	1	8	12	-4								
Poland	1	0	0	1	5	10	-5								
South Korea	1	1	0	0	11	0	+11								
Spain	1	0	1	0	7	7	0								
United States	18	6	1	11	79	98	-19								
Totals	33	11	3	19	139	213	-74								
