= Oona Kauppi =

Finnish floorball player and footballer (born 1997)

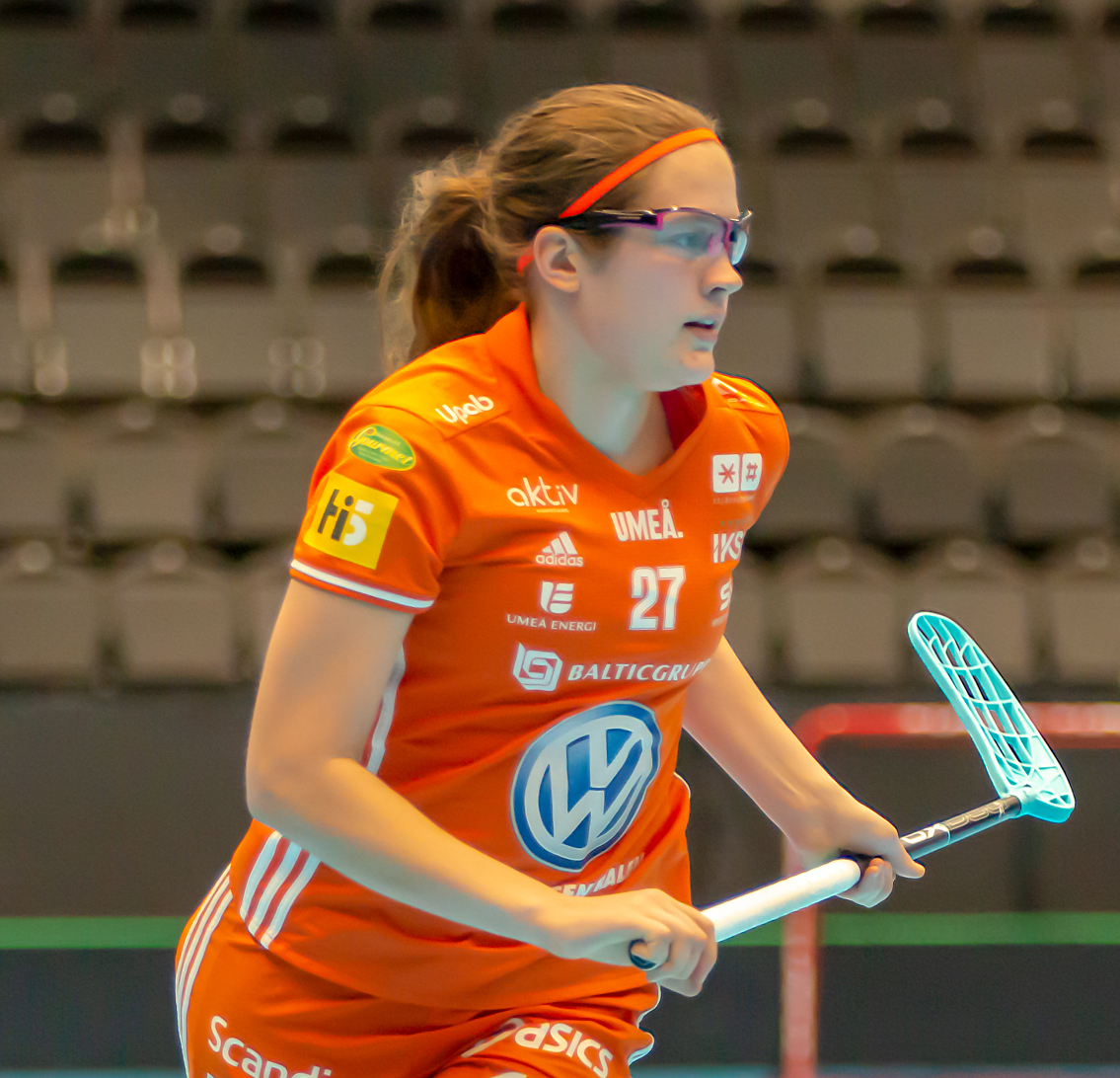
- Kauppi playing for IKSU at the 2019 Champions Cup

Personal information
- National team: Finland
- Born: 19 July 1997 (age 28) Tampere, Finland

Sport
- Sport: Floorball
- League: Swedish Super League
- Club: Team Thorengruppen
Medal record
Women's floorball
Representing Finland
World Games
Gold medal – first place	2025 Chengdu	Team
World Championship
Silver medal – second place	2017 Slovakia	Team
Silver medal – second place	2021 Sweden	Team
Silver medal – second place	2023 Singapore	Team
Bronze medal – third place	2019 Switzerland	Team
Bronze medal – third place	2025 Czech Republic	Team
- Updated on 1 February 2026

Oona Kauppi (born 19 July 1997) is a Finnish floorball player who plays for the Team Thorengruppen and has played over 60 international matches for the Finland national team. She is also a former footballer who has played in the Women's League for Ilves.

== Club career ==
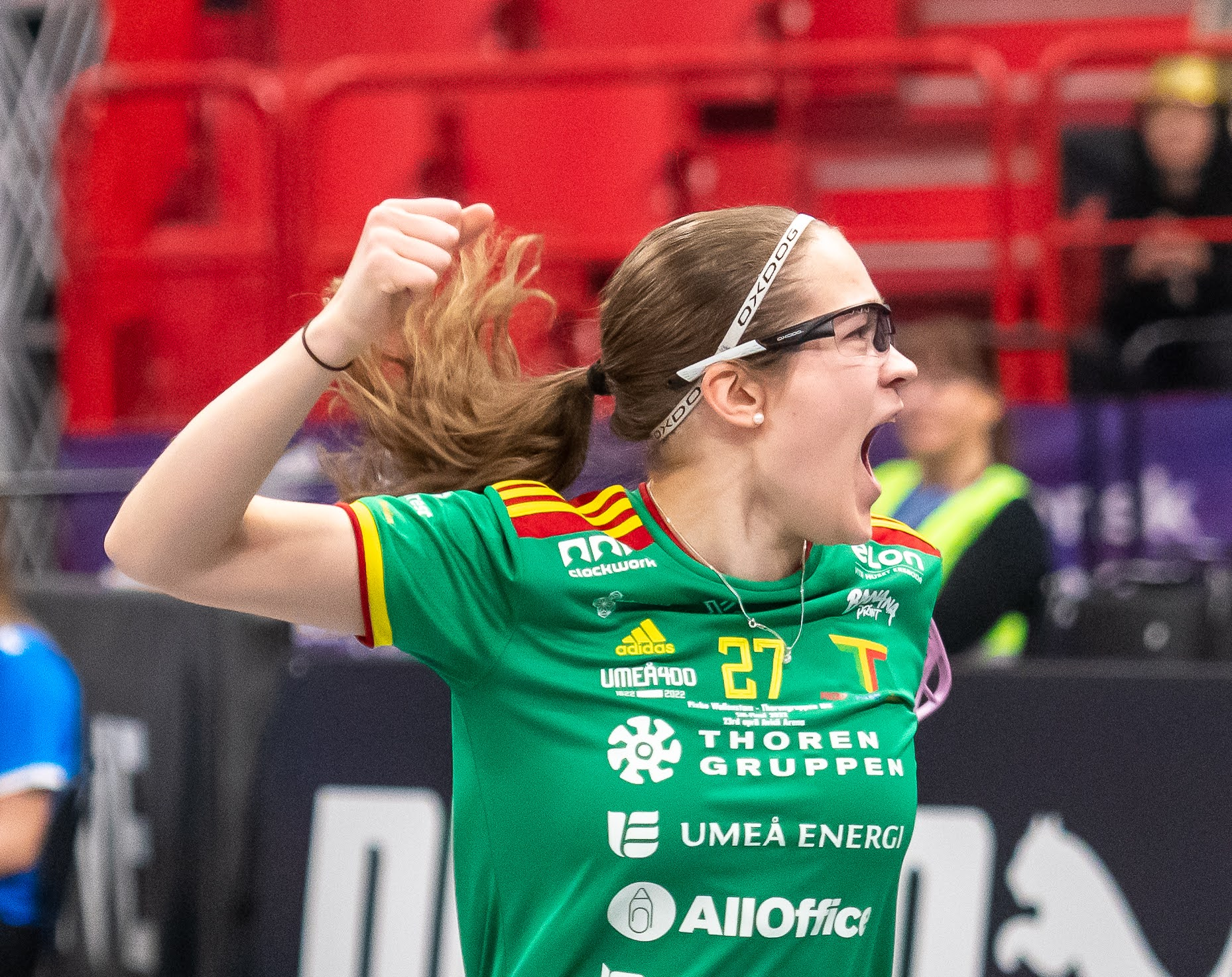
Kauppi playing for Team Thorengruppen in 2022 Swedish Super League final

In floorball, Kauppi was a member of Koovee's squad from 2011 to 2018. In the 2014–2015 season, she was fifth in the league's points total with 32+17. In the summer of 2018, she moved to play for the Swedish Super League team IKSU with her sister Veera.

In 2020, IKSU withdrew from the league due to financial difficulties and the siblings moved to Team Thorengruppen, playing in Umeå. Kauppi was named the best female player of the 2019–2020 season. She won the Swedish league championship with IKSU and Thorengruppen six times in total.

== International career ==
In 2014, Kauppi achieved silver at the World Championship with the Finnish under-19 national team. She was the team's top scorer at the tournament with nine goals and two assists. Kauppi has also served as the captain of that national team. She missed the 2015 Women's World Championships due to a knee injury. In 2016, she won silver at the U19 World Cup for the second time.

In 2017, she won silver at the Women's World Championship, as well as winning bronze in 2019, before winning silver again in 2021 and 2023. She was the top scorer at the 2019 World Championship with 15 goals and was named the tournament's most valuable player.

At the first women's floorball tournament at the World Games in 2025, the Finnish team won a major international tournament for the first time since the 2001 World Championship, after Kauppi assisted her sister on the game-winning goal in the final.

== Association football career ==
In football, Kauppi played as a midfielder. She made her debut for the Ilves in the Women's League in August 2015 against Merilappi United, coming on as a substitute for the last minute. She won one Finnish Championship silver medal in the league.

== Personal life ==
Kauppi's twin sister Veera Kauppi also plays floorball for Team Thorengruppen and the Finnish national team, and has played football for Ilves.

== Awards ==
Kauppi was included among the world's 10 best floorball players six times between 2019 and 2025 in a poll conducted by Innebandymagazinet magazine. Her best placement was 5th in 2019 and 2022.
