= Veera Kauppi =

Finnish floorball player and footballer (born 1997)

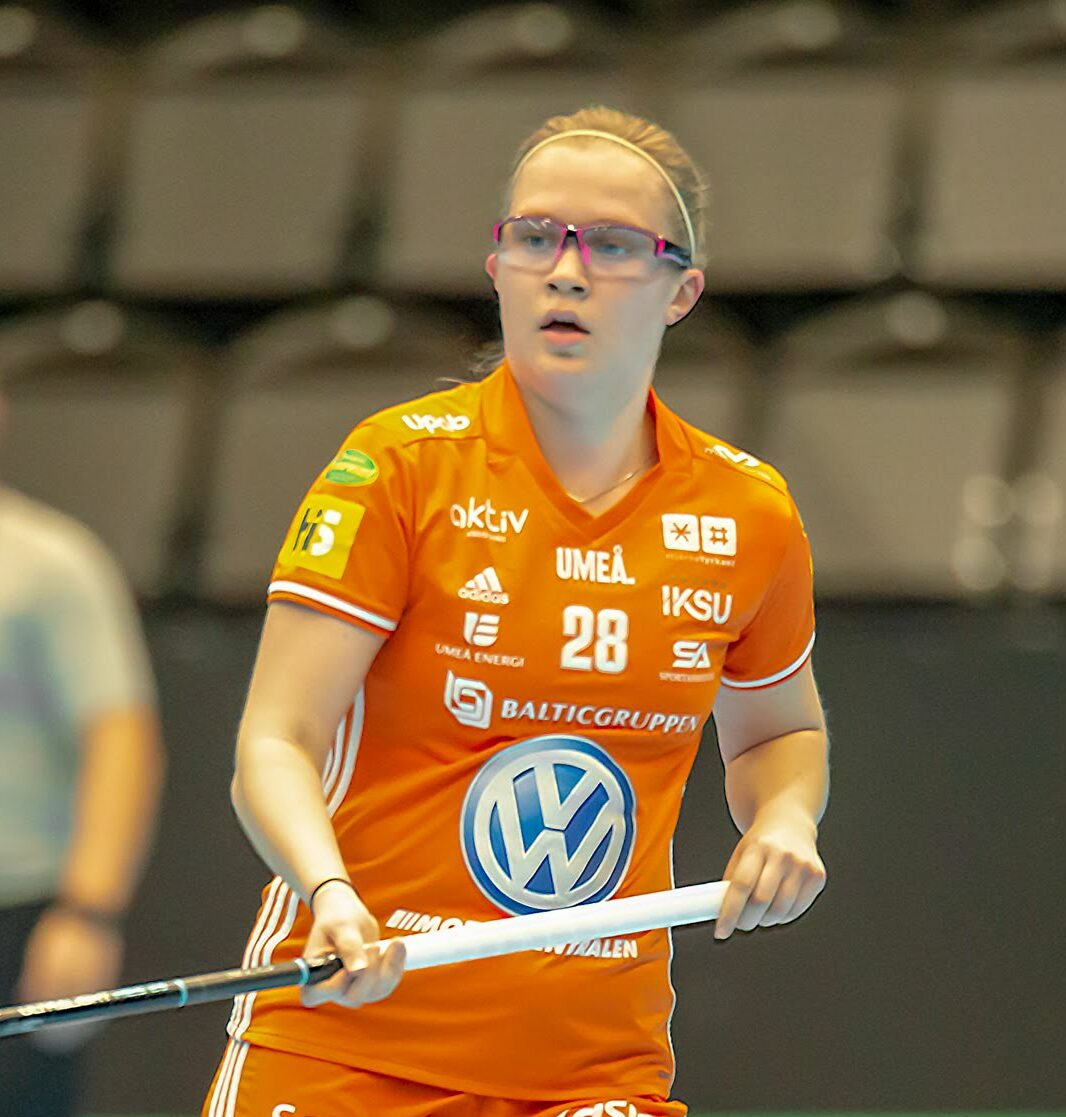
- Kauppi playing for IKSU at the 2019 Champions Cup

Personal information
- National team: Finland
- Born: 19 July 1997 (age 29) Tampere, Finland

Sport
- Sport: Floorball
- League: Swedish Super League (2018–)
- Club: Koovee (2011–2018); IKSU (2018–2020); Team Thorengruppen
Medal record
Women's floorball
Representing Finland
World Games
| Gold medal – first place | 2025 Chengdu | Team |
Women's World Floorball Championship
| Silver medal – second place | 2015 Finland | Team |
| Silver medal – second place | 2017 Slovakia | Team |
| Silver medal – second place | 2021 Sweden | Team |
| Silver medal – second place | 2023 Singapore | Team |
| Bronze medal – third place | 2019 Switzerland | Team |
| Bronze medal – third place | 2025 Czech Republic | Team |
- Updated on 11 September 2024

Veera Kauppi (born 19 July 1997) is a Finnish floorball player and national team member, a gold medallist at the 2025 World Games, a four-time World Championship silver medallist, a six-time Swedish champion, a three-time Champions Cup winner, and a former footballer. Between 2017 and 2023, she was named the World's Best Floorball Player four times, becoming the first Finnish player in history to receive this award.

== Football career ==
Kauppi played football in the Finnish women's league as a midfielder for Tampereen Ilves, with whom she finished second in 2015. She also represented the Finland national under-17 team, making six appearances and scoring two goals.

== Floorball club career ==
Kauppi began playing floorball at a young age with the Finnish club Koovee. She made her debut in the Finnish women's top league in the 2011–12 season. She played for the club until 2018, when she transferred to the Swedish team IKSU. During her time at Koovee, she recorded 256 points—138 goals and 118 assists—in 95 league matches.

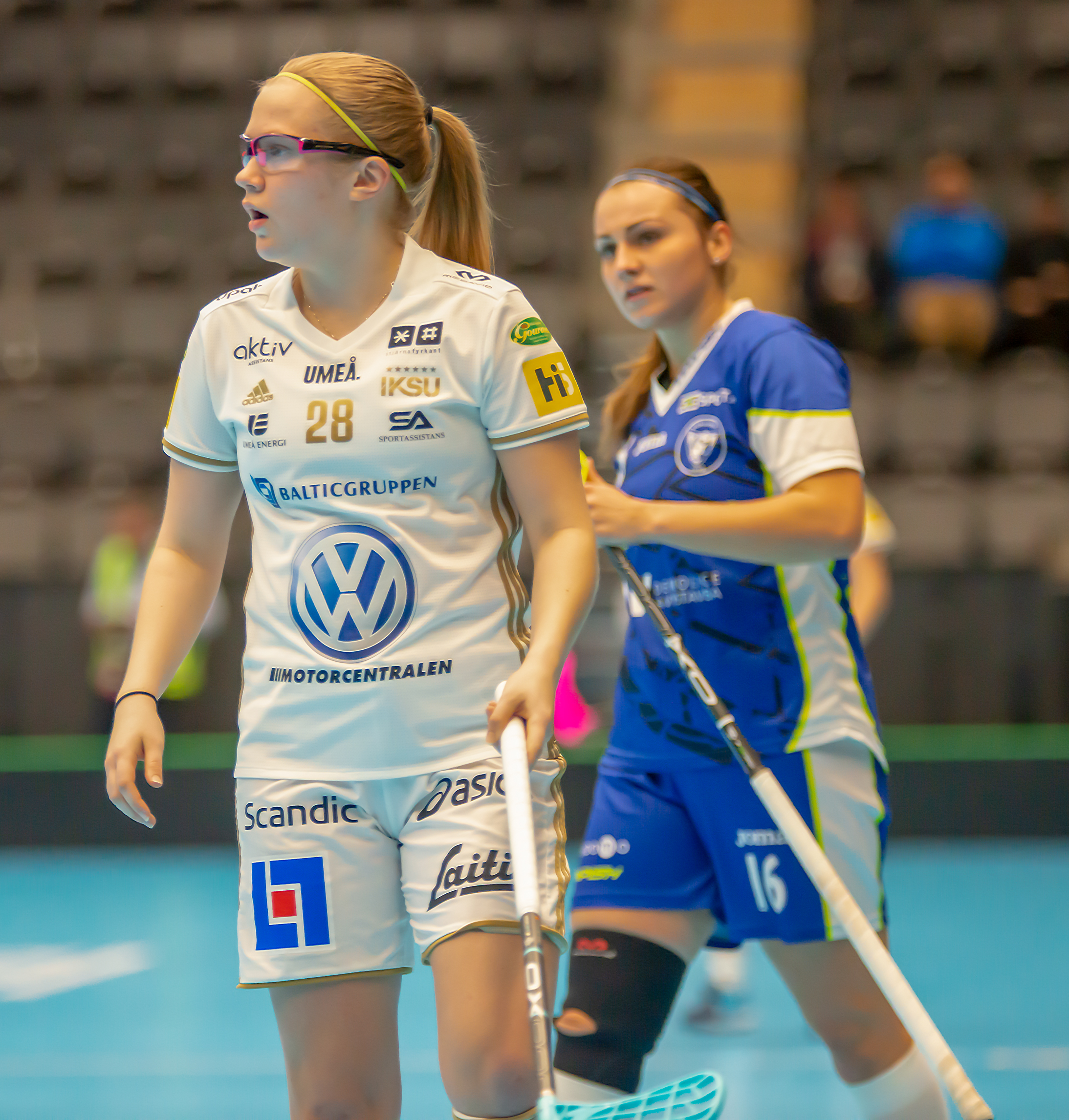
Kauppi playing for IKSU in the 2019 Champions Cup final

In her first season with IKSU, she became not only the league's top goal scorer but also the overall leading point scorer. With 91 points from 60 goals and 31 assists in the regular season, she set a new league record (which she herself surpassed in the 2024–25 season). Although IKSU finished first in the regular season, the team was eliminated in the semifinals of the playoffs. In January 2019, the team won the Champions Cup, with Veera Kauppi scoring a hat trick in the final match. In the following 2019–20 season, she again finished as the league's top scorer. With her team, she won the Swedish league title, which was ended prematurely due to the COVID-19 pandemic.

Ahead of the new season, she signed a contract with Team Thorengruppen, which took over a large part of IKSU's squad after the club decided not to enter the top division for financial reasons. With her new team, she won the league title in very first season (2020–21), contributing in the Superfinal with, among other things, two goals including the game-winner. The team defended the title in the following four seasons, again with significant point contributions from Kauppi. In 2023 and 2024, they also won the Champions Cup. At the beginning of 2025, she broke Anna Wijk's record by registering points in 144 consecutive Swedish Super League matches.

== Floorball international career ==
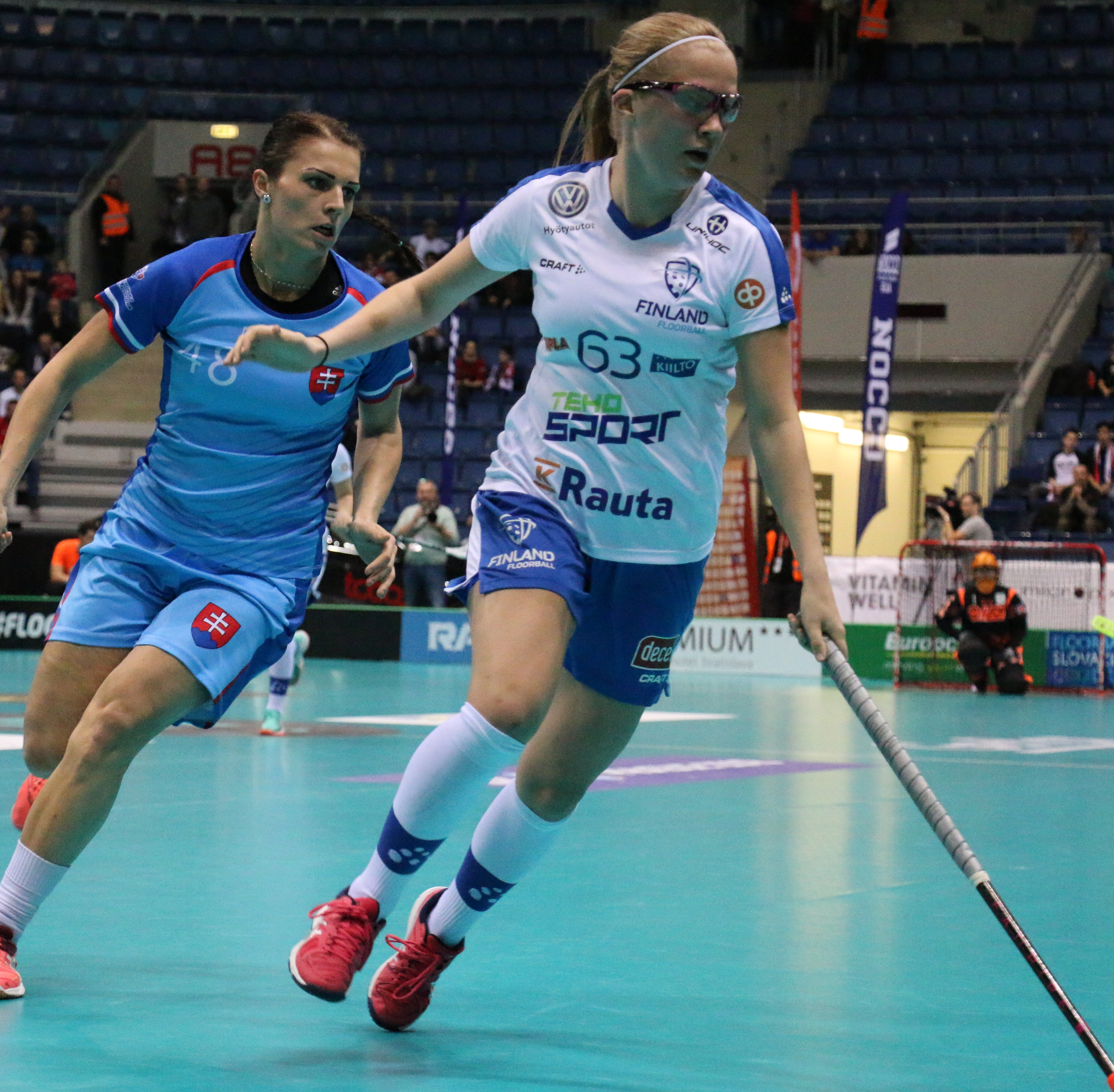
Kauppi playing for the Finland national team at 2017 World Championship

With the junior national team, Kauppi took part in the World Championships in 2014 and 2016. On both occasions, the Finnish team won silver medals.

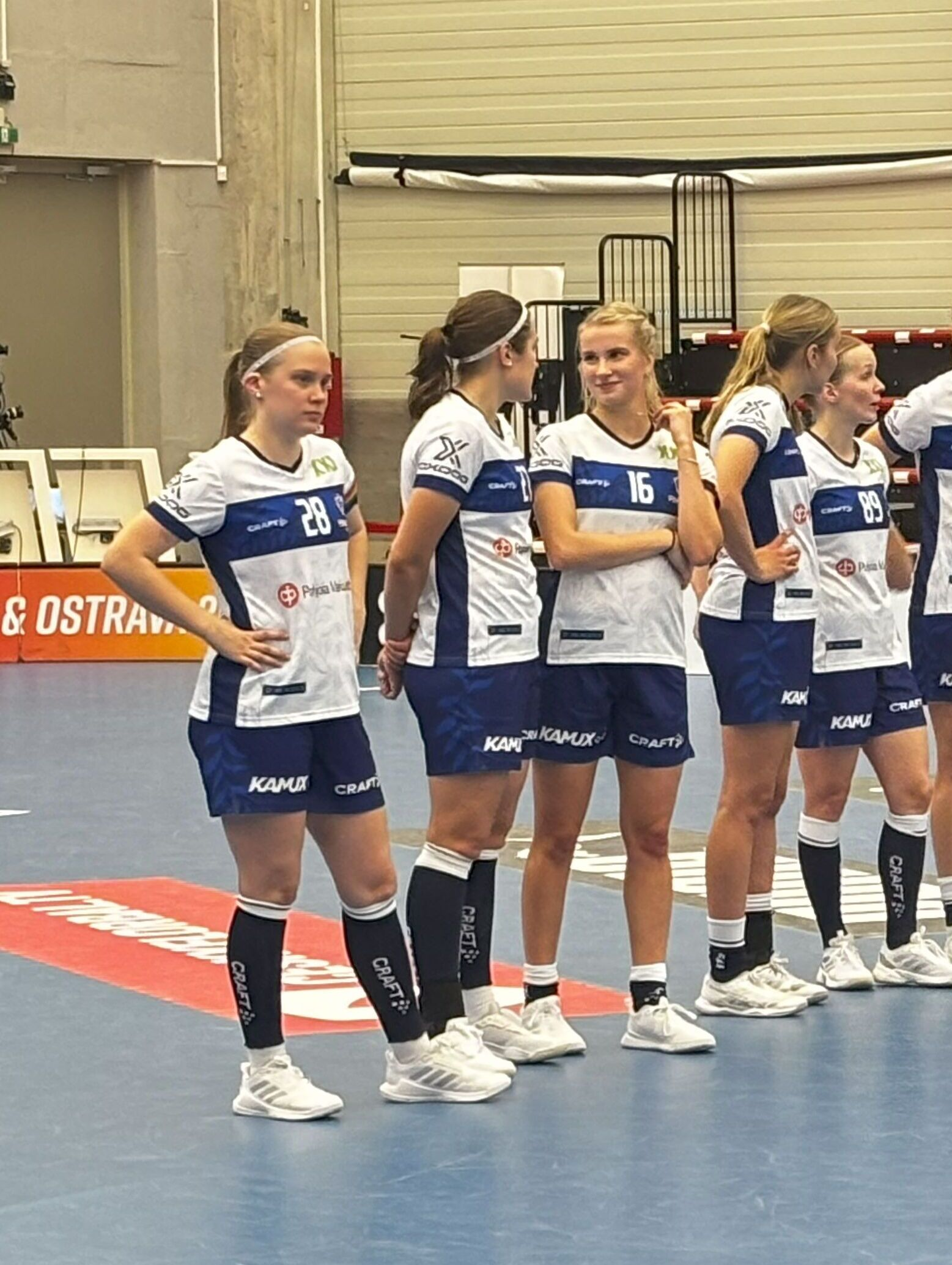
Veera Kauppi (left), as captain of the Finland national team, at the Euro Floorball Tour in 2024, alongside her sister Oona

She first competed with the senior women's national team at the World Championship in 2015, contributing seven points to help Finland secure the silver medal. Finland also finished second in 2017. In the final, they lost to Sweden 5–6 after a penalty shootout; Kauppi scored a hat trick in the match and added one assist. In 2018, she participated in the World University Floorball Championship in Poland, where she won a gold medal. At the 2019 World Championship, Finland claimed the bronze medals, with Kauppi scoring the overtime game-winning goal in the bronze-medal match. At the tournament, she became the most productive Finnish player in World Championship history. At the subsequent World Championships in 2021 and 2023, she served as captain of the Finnish team, which won silver medals on both occasions. She was named the tournament's Most Valuable Player and selected to the All-Star Team at both championships.

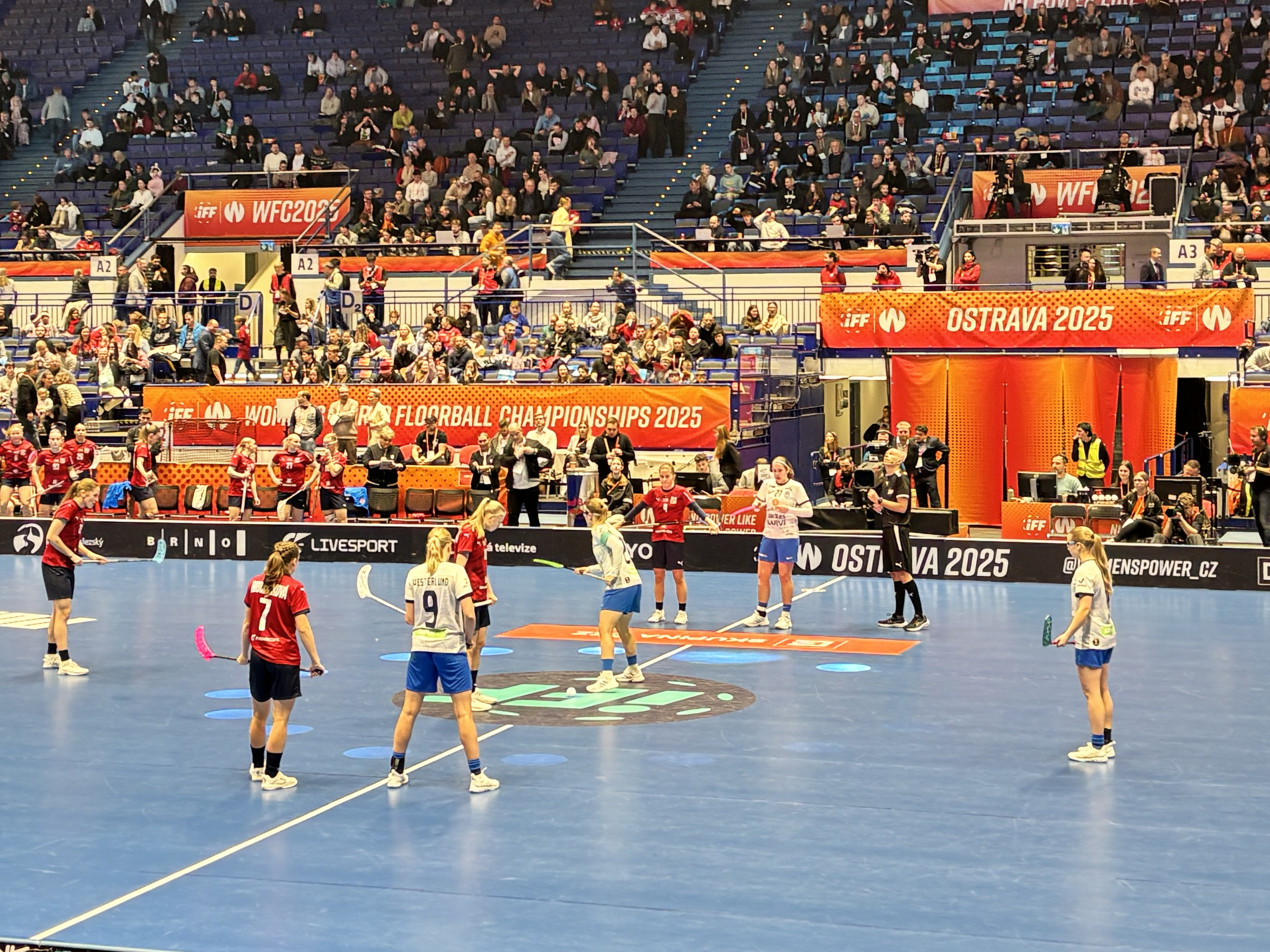
Kauppi (centre) in the semifinal of the 2025 World Championship

At the first women's floorball tournament at the World Games in 2025, the Finnish team won a major international tournament for the first time since the 2001 World Championship, after Kauppi scored the game-winning goal in the final.

At the 2025 World Championship, Kauppi was once again selected to the All-Star Team as the tournament's most productive player. In the bronze-medal match, she contributed one goal and two assists to Finland's first victory over Sweden since 2007. At the tournament she broke Corin Rüttimann's all-time goal record.
