= Great Britain women's national floorball team =

The Great Britain women's national floorball team is the national team of Great Britain. At the 2001 Women's World Floorball Championships in Riga, Latvia, the team finished eighth in the B-Division.
