= France women's national floorball team =

National women's floorball team of Slovenia

- IFF Ranking: 18th (2025)

The France women's national floorball team represents France in international competitions of women's floorball. The team made their debut at the 2023 Women's World Floorball Championships, where they finished 15th.

France holds the world record for the biggest defeat in women's international floorball history, losing 61–0 to Sweden in a 2019 Women's World Floorball Championships qualifying game.

== Results ==
=== Women's World Championships ===
Year	Host country	Rank
2023	Singapore	15th place
