= 2023 Women's World Floorball Championships =

Floorball competition

Tournament details
- Host country: Singapore
- Venues: 2 (in 1 host city)
- Dates: 2 December – 10 December
- Teams: 16

Final positions
- Champions: Sweden (11th title)
- Runners-up: Finland
- Third place: Czech Republic
- Fourth place: Switzerland

Tournament statistics
- Matches played: 48
- Attendance: 22,143 (461 per match)

Awards
- Golden shoe: (Finland) Veera Kauppi

Official website
- Singapore 2023

The 2023 Women's World Floorball Championships was the 14th edition of Women's World Floorball Championship. It was held from 2 to 10 December 2023 in Singapore, marking the first time since the 2005 that the event was held outside Europe. Sweden were the eight-time defending champion, and they made it nine with a 6–4 win over Finland in the final.

The tournament was criticized by sports journalists outside the host country due a low local promotion and consequently a very low ticket sales. Despite this, it was considered a success by the IFF.

== Host selection ==
- Singapore
- Thailand
- Czech Republic (withdrew)

Singapore and Thailand stated they wanted to bid for 2023, while Czech Republic chose to focus on a bid for 2025 after initially confirming an interest for 2023. When the application window ended, only Singapore made an official bid.

Singapore was awarded the hosting rights on 11 December 2020.

== Qualification ==
Thirteen nations returned from 2021. Italy and Thailand both failed to qualify after receiving wildcards for 2021, while Russia was banned from taking part due to its invasion of Ukraine. Those returning were Australia and Japan after withdrawing from 2021, while France made their World Championship debut.

Host Qualified Did not qualify

| | Date | Venue | Vacancies | Qualified |
|---|---|---|---|---|
| Host nation | | | 1 | Singapore |
| European Qualification 1 | 31 January–4 February 2023 | (Latvia) Kocēni | 12 | Sweden; Latvia; Germany |
| European Qualification 2 | 31 January–4 February 2023 | (Latvia) Kocēni | 12 | Finland; Norway; Denmark |
| European Qualification 3 | 31 January–4 February 2023 | (Italy) Lignano Sabbiadoro | 12 | Switzerland; Slovakia; Estonia |
| European Qualification 4 | 31 January–4 February 2023 | (Italy) Lignano Sabbiadoro | 12 | Czech Republic; Poland; France |
| Americas Qualification | 25–26 February 2023 | (Canada) Toronto | 1 | United States |
| Asia-Oceania Qualification | 31 January – 5 February 2023 | (Thailand) Chonburi | 2 | Australia; Japan |
| Total | | | 16 | |

== Venues ==
Two arenas were used, OCBC Arena and Singapore Indoor stadium, both within the Singapore Sports Hub.

| Singapore | Singapore | 2023 Women's World Floorball Championships is located in Singapore |
| Singapore Indoor Stadium; Capacity: 12,000 | OCBC Arena (Note: OCBC Arena used two arenas during the tournament. Hall 1 had a capacity of 3,000, while Hall 2 had a capacity of 300.); Capacity: 3,000 | 2023 Women's World Floorball Championships is located in Singapore |

== Draw ==
The draw took place on 6 April 2023 in the Park Royal in Singapore. The pots were based on the IFF rankings.

| Pot 1 | Pot 2 | Pot 3 | Pot 4 |
|---|---|---|---|
| Sweden (1); Finland (2); Switzerland (3); Czech Republic (4) | Poland (5); Slovakia (6); Norway (7); Latvia (8) | Germany (9); Denmark (10); Australia (11); Japan (12) | Singapore (13) (H); Estonia (14); United States (15); France (27) |

== Preliminary round ==
The schedule was announced on 25 May 2023. Times are SGT (UTC+8).

=== Group A ===
| Pos | Team | Pld | W | D | L | GF | GA | GD | Pts | Qualification |
|---|---|---|---|---|---|---|---|---|---|---|
| 1 | Finland | 3 | 3 | 0 | 0 | 29 | 9 | +20 | 6 | Quarterfinals |
| 2 | Switzerland | 3 | 2 | 0 | 1 | 35 | 12 | +23 | 4 | Quarterfinals |
| 3 | Norway | 3 | 1 | 0 | 2 | 9 | 17 | −8 | 2 | Play-off round |
| 4 | Latvia | 3 | 0 | 0 | 3 | 5 | 40 | −35 | 0 | Play-off round |

Source: IFF

| 2 December 2023; 16:00 | Latvia | 1–14 (0–4, 1–7, 0–3) | Finland | OCBC Arena 2 Attendance: 145 |

Game reference
Paula Egle 37:19 (PP) / Goals / 04:32 Hanna Niemelä; 12:24 Jenna Saario; 17:35, 38:52, 54:35 (PP) Miisa Turunen; 19:41, 20:23, 23:30, 34:28 Veera Kauppi; 24:28 Johanna Homi; 29:45, 56:07, 58:45 (P) Oona Kauppi; 39:42 Laura Rantanen

| 2 December 2023; 17:00 | Switzerland | 8–2 (0–0, 3–0, 5–2) | Norway | OCBC Arena 1 Attendance: 397 |

Game reference
Céline Stettler 27:23; Isabelle Gerig 37:30; Doris Berger 38:15; Corin Rüttimann 47:06; Leonie Wieland 48:00; Anja Wyss 51:10 (PP), 59:45; Nathalie Spichiger 59:54 / Goals / 52:41 Rikke Ingebrigtsli Hansen; 57:11 (PP) Emma Fagerhøi

| 3 December 2023; 16:00 | Norway | 4–3 (1–2, 2–1, 1–0) | Latvia | OCBC Arena 2 Attendance: 139 |

Game reference
Sofie Kristiansen 02:24; Kine Hedlund Eriksen 24:13; Emma Fagerhøi 26:00; Line Terjesen 55:13 / Goals / 08:22, 13:21 Simona Grāpēna; 27:41 Jūlija Rozīte

| 3 December 2023; 17:00 | Finland | 9–5 (2–0, 6–1, 1–4) | Switzerland | OCBC Arena 1 Attendance: 513 |

Game reference
My Kippilä 02:43 (PS), 39:59; Johanna Homi 10:45; Oona Kauppi 21:23, 26:25; Sara Piispa 24:41; Meri-Helmi Höynälä 32:44; Veera Kauppi 34:56; Hanna Niemelä 56:30 (EN) / Goals / 35:12 (OG); 44:18 (WG), 58:32 (WG) Céline Stettler; 45:20 (WG) Nathalie Spichiger; 55:37 (WG) Anja Wyss

| 4 December 2023; 19:00 | Finland | 6–3 (3–1, 1–1, 2–1) | Norway | OCBC Arena 2 Attendance: 225 |

Game reference
Sofia Leino 06:14; Veera Kauppi 11:45; Laura Rantanen 19:49; Meri-Helmi Höynälä 39:26; Emilia Pietilä 43:36; Miisa Turunen 52:33 (PP) / Goals / 12:16 Nicoline Marie Karlsen Olsen; 37:14 (PP) Tone Einstulen; 40:43 (PP) Rikke Ingebrigtsli Hansen

| 4 December 2023; 20:00 | Latvia | 1–22 (0–7, 0–5, 1–10) | Switzerland | OCBC Arena 1 Attendance: 378 |

Game reference
Anna Ankudinova 47:54 / Goals / 01:18, 46:54, 59:59 Nina Metzger; 02:20, 40:27, 58:48 Corin Rüttimann; 06:21 Luana Rensch; 09:17, 56:25 Leonie Wieland; 09:31, 27:46 (PP) Nathalie Spichiger; 12:52 Selma Bergmann; 16:34 (PP), 20:36, 30:19, 35:34, 44:53, 53:42 Isabelle Gerig; 22:15 Céline Stettler; 52:38 Anja Wyss; 57:15, 59:50 Lea Hanimann

=== Group B ===
| Pos | Team | Pld | W | D | L | GF | GA | GD | Pts | Qualification |
|---|---|---|---|---|---|---|---|---|---|---|
| 1 | Sweden | 3 | 3 | 0 | 0 | 51 | 5 | +46 | 6 | Quarterfinals |
| 2 | Czech Republic | 3 | 2 | 0 | 1 | 19 | 10 | +9 | 4 | Quarterfinals |
| 3 | Slovakia | 3 | 1 | 0 | 2 | 9 | 32 | −23 | 2 | Play-off round |
| 4 | Poland | 3 | 0 | 0 | 3 | 7 | 39 | −32 | 0 | Play-off round |

Source: IFF

| 2 December 2023; 19:00 | Slovakia | 3–20 (0–6, 2–10, 1–4) | Sweden | OCBC Arena 2 Attendance: 127 |

Game reference
Lenka Červená 29:08; Zuzana Mrázová 38:16; Laura Chúpeková 58:10 / Goals / 01:55, 23:17 Moa Gustafsson; 02:08, 21:58, 31:08 Klara Loneberg; 12:24, 36:12 Jonna Stenvall; 12:41 Cajsa Elm; 18:01, 20:34 Amanda Delgado Johansson; 19:38 Maja Viström; 25:15 Emelie Wibron; 32:16, 34:54, 39:18, 40:23 Wilma Johansson; 38:38, 46:06 Hanna Nordstrand; 45:26 (OG); 53:26 Moa Andersson

| 3 December 2023; 18:45 | Czech Republic | 9–3 (5–3, 2–0, 2–0) | Poland | OCBC Arena 2 Attendance: 321 |

Game reference
Denisa Ratajová 08:04, 13:41, 30:37; Nela Jiráková 12:34; Anna Brucháčková 17:19; Eliška Chudá 17:36; Karolína Suchá 21:35, 50:08; Eliška Krupnová 54:03 / Goals / 04:01 Katarzyna Rajska; 16:34 (SH) Zuzanna Krzywak; 19:11 Malwina Zagórska

| 4 December 2023; 16:00 | Poland | 3–5 (0–2, 1–2, 2–1) | Slovakia | OCBC Arena 2 Attendance: 205 |

Game reference
Gabriela Wójcik 24:56; Katarzyna Rajska 41:25; Malwina Zagórska 50:09 (PP) / Goals / 01:48 Kristína Belicová; 07:41 (PS) Paulína Hudáková; 33:16 Dominique Schnetzer; 39:09 Laura Chúpeková; 52:34 Jana Trošková

| 4 December 2023; 17:00 | Czech Republic | 1–6 (1–1, 0–3, 0–2) | Sweden | OCBC Arena 1 Attendance: 526 |

Game reference
Karolína Klubalová 13:05 / Goals / 14:44 Cajsa Elm; 25:34 (PP) Amanda Delgado Johansson; 35:10 (PP) Emelie Wibron; 37:13, 59:52 Moa Gustafsson; 51:41 (SH) Ellen Bäckstedt

| 5 December 2023; 17:00 | Sweden | 25–1 (11–0, 5–1, 9–0) | Poland | OCBC Arena 1 Attendance: 449 |

Game reference
Maja Viström 05:45; Moa Gustafsson 06:36; Moa Andersson 09:33; Emelie Wibron 10:21, 13:57, 33:32, 33:49, 53:24; Ellen Rasmussen 11:33, 14:41, 16:58, 18:51, 37:41, 43:14; Wilma Johansson 12:36, 14:26, 44:31, 56:25; Hanna Nordstrand 32:24; Amanda Delgado Johansson 34:41, 54:12; Klara Loneberg 49:17 (SH), 52:50; Nellie Öhgren 52:32; Lisa Carlsson 57:51 / Goals / 36:30 Dominika Buczek

| 5 December 2023; 20:00 | Slovakia | 1–9 (1–2, 0–3, 0–4) | Czech Republic | OCBC Arena 2 Attendance: 135 |

Game reference
Paulína Hudáková 01:48 (PS) / Goals / 13:19 Michaela Kubečková; 19:11 Nela Jiráková; 25:02, 52:49, 58:28 (EN) Anna Brucháčková; 25:26 Eliška Chudá; 35:22 (PP) Eliška Krupnová; 42:27 Vendula Maroszová; 48:04 Michaela Mechlová

=== Group C ===
| Pos | Team | Pld | W | D | L | GF | GA | GD | Pts | Qualification |
|---|---|---|---|---|---|---|---|---|---|---|
| 1 | Germany | 3 | 3 | 0 | 0 | 23 | 3 | +20 | 6 | Play-off round |
| 2 | Singapore (H) | 3 | 2 | 0 | 1 | 11 | 7 | +4 | 4 | Play-off round |
| 3 | France | 3 | 0 | 1 | 2 | 8 | 20 | −12 | 1 | 13–16 place semifinals |
| 4 | Australia | 3 | 0 | 1 | 2 | 7 | 19 | −12 | 1 | 13–16 place semifinals |

Source: IFF
(H) Hosts

| 2 December 2023; 12:30 | Australia | 0–10 (0–1, 0–4, 0–5) | Germany | OCBC Arena 2 Attendance: 123 |

Game reference
Goals / 06:45 Janika Milena Willingmann; 23:48 Andrea Gerdes; 25:47, 47:17 Anna-Lena Best; 33:16 Randi Kleerbaum; 37:56 Ellen Kunigk; 41:33 Elena Bröker; 52:29 Nathalie Berger; 53:49, 59:58 Winona Jürgens

| 2 December 2023; 20:00 | France | 2–5 (0–0, 2–1, 0–4) | Singapore | OCBC Arena 1 Attendance: 579 |

Game reference
Pauline Meneust 26:59, 37:22 / Goals / 32:39 Shannon Yeo; 43:22 Daphne Tan; 48:50 Yun Shawn Yee; 51:59 Nasha Jeffri; 58:05 Michelle Lok

| 3 December 2023; 13:00 | Germany | 10–1 (4–1, 4–0, 2–0) | France | OCBC Arena 2 Attendance: 86 |

Game reference
Anna-Lena Best 05:09, 10:56, 13:45, 25:46 (SH); Andrea Gerdes 17:30; Ina Jensen 20:28; Winona Jürgens 34:06; Pauline Baumgarten 37:44; Randi Kleerbaum 41:30, 43:32 / Goals / 07:24 Marine Klopfenstein

| 3 December 2023; 20:00 | Australia | 2–4 (1–2, 0–1, 1–1) | Singapore | OCBC Arena 1 Attendance: 617 |

Game reference
Melissa Creagh 08:20; Amanda Bartrim 43:56 / Goals / 08:50 Amanda Yeap; 09:33 Siti Nurhaliza Khairul Anuar; 37:38 Yun Shawn Yee; 46:47 Mindy Lim

| 5 December 2023; 13:00 | France | 5–5 (1–1, 3–0, 1–4) | Australia | OCBC Arena 2 Attendance: 113 |

Game reference
Marine Klopfenstein 17:59, 34:06; Émilie Waeber Belet 20:21; 32:56 (OG); Pauline Meneust 56:58 (PP) / Goals / 02:08 Hayley Cole; 41:36 Zoe Shanahan; 51:48, 58:54 (WG) Melissa Creagh; 59:10 (WG) Blaise Hodges

| 5 December 2023; 20:00 | Singapore | 2–3 (0–1, 1–0, 1–2) | Germany | OCBC Arena 1 Attendance: 671 |

Game reference
Siti Nurhaliza Khairul Anuar 39:13; Jerelee Ong 43:33 / Goals / 10:33 Elena Bröker; 43:58 Pauline Baumgarten; 54:58 (SH) Winona Jürgens

=== Group D ===
| Pos | Team | Pld | W | D | L | GF | GA | GD | Pts | Qualification |
|---|---|---|---|---|---|---|---|---|---|---|
| 1 | Japan | 3 | 2 | 1 | 0 | 14 | 10 | +4 | 5 | Play-off round |
| 2 | Denmark | 3 | 2 | 0 | 1 | 17 | 9 | +8 | 4 | Play-off round |
| 3 | Estonia | 3 | 1 | 1 | 1 | 16 | 12 | +4 | 3 | 13–16 place semifinals |
| 4 | United States | 3 | 0 | 0 | 3 | 10 | 26 | −16 | 0 | 13–16 place semifinals |

Source: IFF

| 2 December 2023; 13:30 | United States | 3–9 (1–4, 1–3, 1–2) | Estonia | OCBC Arena 1 Attendance: 225 |

Game reference
Suzanne Lindquist 19:27; Klara Kyrk Gere 39:59, 55:40 / Goals / 02:41, 09:45 Kati Kütisaar; 12:22 Kädi Keinast; 15:05, 43:24 Piret Puidak; 24:32 Milja Alanko; 29:46 Reti Väärt; 36:40 Edith Pärnik; 52:09 Kirke Pollisinski

| 3 December 2023; 14:00 | Denmark | 2–3 (1–0, 0–1, 1–2) | Japan | OCBC Arena 1 Attendance: 233 |

Game reference
Sara Mainz Olsson 14:03; Frida Josefine Keller 42:22 / Goals / 32:29 Rei Goto; 40:14 (PS), 55:31 Yui Goto

| 4 December 2023; 13:00 | Japan | 8–5 (5–0, 2–4, 1–1) | United States | OCBC Arena 2 Attendance: 125 |

Game reference
Shiho Morinaga 02:58; Rei Goto 04:39, 48:33; Amane Sasaki 10:12; Mahiro Shimizu 12:57; Rimi Motoki 18:31; Yu Abe 24:22; Yui Goto 36:38 / Goals / 21:44, 34:11, 46:00 Klara Kyrk Gere; 25:44 Suzanne Lindquist; 31:27 Christine Lindberg

| 4 December 2023; 14:00 | Denmark | 6–4 (4–1, 2–2, 0–1) | Estonia | OCBC Arena 1 Attendance: 127 |

Game reference
Sille Larsen 04:42, 16:20; Lina Voldby 07:21, 10:05; Frida Josefine Keller 32:56; Marie Abildgaard 39:13 / Goals / 19:34, 28:05, 49:01 Edith Pärnik; 20:44 Nelli Alanko

| 5 December 2023; 14:00 | Estonia | 3–3 (0–0, 2–2, 1–1) | Japan | OCBC Arena 1 Attendance: 231 |

Game reference
Kati Kütisaar 20:33; 26:08 (OG); Piret Puidak 44:45 (PP) / Goals / 25:16 (PP) Mahiro Shimizu; 27:37 Yu Abe; 49:15 Shiho Morinaga

| 5 December 2023; 16:00 | United States | 2–9 (1–0, 1–3, 0–6) | Denmark | OCBC Arena 2 Attendance: 114 |

Game reference
Selma Johansson 04:41; Catherine Lovitt 30:18 / Goals / 24:37, 43:44 Sara Mainz Olsson; 36:56 Lina Voldby; 39:20 Sophine Bergen Jørgensen; 42:28, 49:29 (SH) Sofia Vestergaard Frederiksen; 46:51 Victoria Wohlert; 47:36 Anna Habersatter; 59:10 Esther Juul Thomsen

== Knockout stage ==
=== Bracket ===
Play-off; 6 December
Latvia | 8
Japan | 5
Slovakia | 11
Singapore | 2
Poland | 4 (OT)
Germany | 3
Norway | 3
Denmark | 4 (OT)

Quarterfinals; 7–8 December
Sweden | 13
Latvia | 3
Switzerland | 8
Slovakia | 4
Finland | 11
Poland | 2
Czech Republic | 13
Denmark | 1

Semifinals; 9 December
Sweden | 4
Switzerland | 2
Finland | 8
Czech Republic | 2

Final; 10 December
Sweden | 6
Finland | 4
Third place
Switzerland | 4
Czech Republic | 5

=== Play-off round ===
| 6 December 2023; 16:00 | Latvia | 8–5 (4–1, 3–3, 1–1) | Japan | OCBC Arena 2 Attendance: 173 |

Game reference
Dārta Derupa 07:01; Simona Grāpēna 12:10, 27:44, 36:15; Zane Darša 17:48, 38:11; Evelīna Garbare 19:48; Marta Drille 51:42 / Goals / 18:32 Yu Abe; 22:52 Rei Goto; 26:24, 38:00 Rimi Motoki; 53:09 (PP) Natsumi Yokota

| 6 December 2023; 17:00 | Norway | 3–4 OT (2–1, 0–1, 1–1); OT: 0–1 | Denmark | OCBC Arena 1 Attendance: 210 |

Game reference
Rikke Ingebrigtsli Hansen 04:32, 19:33, 46:03 / Goals / 10:00 Frida Josefine Keller; 32:05 Sara Mainz Olsson; 56:08, 64:55 Lina Voldby

| 6 December 2023; 19:00 | Poland | 4–3 OT (1–1, 0–2, 2–0); OT: 1–0 | Germany | OCBC Arena 2 Attendance: 159 |

Game reference
Maja Helman 19:06; Katarzyna Rajska 57:37 (WG), 61:47; Gabriela Wójcik 58:21 (WG) / Goals / 05:36, 32:12 Randi Kleerbaum; 25:22 Anna-Lena Best

| 6 December 2023; 20:00 | Slovakia | 11–2 (2–2, 4–0, 5–0) | Singapore | OCBC Arena 1 Attendance: 302 |

Game reference
Kristína Belicová 16:44; Jana Trošková 18:03, 43:58; Paulína Hudáková 24:58; Kristína Hudáková 25:13, 31:28; Linda Pudišová 33:13 (PP); Lenka Červená 51:22; Alžbeta Ďuríková 51:50; Michaela Žikavská 55:21; Laura Chúpeková 58:14 / Goals / 10:16 Siti Nurhaliza Khairul Anuar; 19:38 Mindy Lim

=== Quarterfinals ===
| 7 December 2023; 17:00 | Finland | 11–2 (7–2, 0–0, 4–0) | Poland | OCBC Arena 1 Attendance: 247 |

Game reference
Hanna Niemelä 01:46, 10:48, 13:57; Sara Piispa 06:29, 19:48; Oona Kauppi 15:58; Milla Nordlund 18:46; Johanna Homi 44:49, 55:28; Veera Kauppi 45:21; Jenna Saario 47:11 (PP) / Goals / 09:50 Martyna Grądzka; 19:09 Malwina Zagórska

| 7 December 2023; 20:00 | Sweden | 13–3 (4–0, 4–0, 5–3) | Latvia | OCBC Arena 1 Attendance: 242 |

Game reference
Lisa Carlsson 01:49; Moa Tschöp 13:56, 16:09; Moa Gustafsson 18:20; Hanna Nordstrand 22:29, 43:29, 45:44; Emelie Wibron 24:09 (PP), 36:46; Klara Molin 25:00; Wilma Johansson 40:34 (PP), 51:32; Sandra Boric Svärd 47:29 / Goals / 43:24 Anna Ankudinova; 44:20 Simona Grāpēna; 57:37 Dārta Derupa

| 8 December 2023; 14:00 | Switzerland | 8–4 (2–1, 5–1, 1–2) | Slovakia | OCBC Arena 1 Attendance: 211 |

Game reference
Nathalie Spichiger 01:49, 51:08 (EN); Seraina Fitzi 14:15; Isabelle Gerig 23:57, 26:10; Leonie Wieland 24:51; Céline Stettler 28:22 (PP); Chiara Gredig 31:02 (SH), ' (EN) / Goals / 11:36, 45:04 Paulína Hudáková; 33:39 (PP) Kristína Belicová; 56:15 Katarína Klapitová

| 8 December 2023; 17:00 | Czech Republic | 13–1 (6–0, 5–0, 2–1) | Denmark | OCBC Arena 1 Attendance: 394 |

Game reference
Eliška Krupnová 01:50, 12:21, 56:11; Karolína Suchá 09:15; Anna Brucháčková 10:29 (PP), 38:32 (PS), 46:07; Eliška Chudá 17:19; Martina Řepková 19:34, 27:25, 39:37; Michaela Kubečková 32:47; Vendula Maroszová 36:19 / Goals / 49:08 Lina Voldby

=== Semifinals ===
| 9 December 2023; 17:00 | Finland | 8–2 (2–1, 4–1, 2–0) | Czech Republic | Indoor Stadium; Attendance: 1733 |

Game reference
Oona Kauppi 01:12; Veera Kauppi 13:12, 22:15, 37:53, 55:58; Miisa Turunen 27:15; Jenna Saario 31:15; My Kippilä 48:38 (PP) / Goals / 14:58 Vanessa Rebecca Keprtová; 29:45 (PP) Denisa Ratajová

| 9 December 2023; 20:15 | Sweden | 4–2 (2–1, 1–0, 1–1) | Switzerland | Indoor Stadium; Attendance: 1847 |

Game reference
Wilma Johansson 03:14 (PP), 50:53; Ellen Rasmussen 10:25; Ellen Bäckstedt 36:45 / Goals / 16:07 Laila Ediz; 47:43 (PP) Céline Stettler

=== Bronze-medal game ===
| 10 December 2023; 16:00 | Switzerland | 4–5 (1–0, 1–2, 2–3) | Czech Republic | Indoor Stadium; Attendance: 2253 |

Game reference
Corin Rüttimann 16:35; Isabelle Gerig 27:59 (DP), 59:15 (WG); Céline Stettler 46:56 (PP) / Goals / 29:56 (DP) Anna Brucháčková; 37:23, 58:07 Vanessa Rebecca Keprtová; 43:08 Eliška Krupnová; 49:10 Denisa Ratajová

=== Final ===
| 10 December 2023; 19:00 | Sweden | 6–4 (6–0, 0–1, 0–3) | Finland | Indoor Stadium; Attendance: 3971 |

Game reference
Maja Viström 00:31, 15:56; Moa Tschöp 06:31; Lisa Carlsson 08:13; Amanda Delgado Johansson 12:23; Ellen Rasmussen 19:36 / Goals / 39:16 Sara Piispa; 42:46 (PP) Miisa Turunen; 48:43 (PP) Oona Kauppi; 56:43 (WG) Jenna Saario

== Placement round ==
=== 13th place Bracket ===
13–16th-place semifinals
6 December
Estonia | 5
Australia | 0
6 December
France | 1
United States | 4

13th-place game
7 December
Estonia | 9
United States | 4
15th-place game
7 December
Australia | 4
France | 5

=== 13–16th-place semifinals ===
| 6 December 2023; 13:00 | Estonia | 5–0 (2–0, 2–0, 1–0) | Australia | OCBC Arena 2 Attendance: 167 |

Game reference
Milja Alanko 16:41; Piret Puidak 17:35; Edith Pärnik 31:46; Diana Klavan 37:48; Sharlote Marleen Kõverik 44:34 / Goals

| 6 December 2023; 14:00 | France | 1–4 (0–1, 1–2, 0–1) | United States | OCBC Arena 1 Attendance: 127 |

Game reference
Pauline Meneust 39:11 / Goals / 09:52 (PP) Klara Kyrk Gere; 21:28 Marie Häggström; 39:03, 44:19 Selma Johansson

=== 15th-place game ===
| 7 December 2023; 13:00 | Australia | 4–5 (0–0, 3–1, 1–4) | France | OCBC Arena 2 Attendance: 122 |

Game reference
Melissa Creagh 20:38, 57:39; Blaise Hodges 28:36; Tiffany Mackintosh 39:20 / Goals / 27:23, 54:32, 58:36, 59:11 Marine Klopfenstein; 55:54 Sandie Masi

=== 13th-place game ===
| 7 December 2023; 14:00 | Estonia | 9–4 (3–1, 4–3, 2–0) | United States | OCBC Arena 1 Attendance: 102 |

Game reference
Milja Alanko 12:25, 39:43; Piret Puidak 15:52, 38:13, 50:36 (SH); Johanna Siling 18:18; Reti Väärt 20:29; Nelli Alanko 23:49; Kati Kütisaar 57:30 (EN) / Goals / 16:02, 20:23 Selma Johansson; 23:41 Klara Kyrk Gere; 38:37 Christine Lindberg

=== 9th place Bracket ===
9–12th-place semifinals
7 December
Singapore | 3
Japan | 4
7 December
Norway | 2
Germany | 3

9th-place game
8 December
Japan | 4
Germany | 1
11th-place game
9 December
Singapore | 1
Norway | 13

=== 9–12th-place semifinals ===
| 7 December 2023; 16:00 | Norway | 2–3 (1–2, 0–0, 1–1) | Germany | OCBC Arena 2 Attendance: 155 |

Game reference
Rikke Ingebrigtsli Hansen 07:52; Johanna Ragnarsson 50:30 / Goals / 10:51 Theresa Beppler-Alt; 15:47 Winona Jürgens; 55:34 Ellen Kunigk

| 7 December 2023; 20:00 | Singapore | 3–4 (0–0, 2–3, 1–1) | Japan | OCBC Arena 2 Attendance: 357 |

Game reference
Amanda Yeap 30:50; Yun Shawn Yee 37:48; Jerelee Ong 44:02 / Goals / 23:51 (PP) Natsumi Yokota; 24:01 Yui Goto; 35:02 Mahiro Shimizu; 47:05 Yu Abe

=== 11th-place game ===
| 9 December 2023; 14:00 | Singapore | 1–13 (0–3, 1–2, 0–8) | Norway | Indoor Stadium; Attendance: 781 |

Game reference
Siti Nurhaliza Khairul Anuar 38:20 / Goals / 14:18, 27:58 Tone Einstulen; 18:26 Marte Pedersen; 19:37 (PP), 50:10, 53:07, 54:16 Rikke Ingebrigtsli Hansen; 33:24 Kine Hedlund Eriksen; 49:56 Martine Simonsen; 50:28, 58:49 Ida Sundberg; 53:30 Nicoline Marie Karlsen Olsen; 55:02 Kine Hedlund Eriksen

=== 9th-place game ===
| 8 December 2023; 20:00 | Japan | 4–1 (0–1, 1–0, 3–0) | Germany | OCBC Arena 1 Attendance: 267 |

Game reference
Yu Abe 22:41; Yui Goto 52:48 (PP); Fuka Shibata 58:38 (EN); Mahiro Shimizu 59:12 (EN) / Goals / 09:09 Vanessa Weikum

=== 5th place Bracket ===
5−8th-place semifinals
9 December
Poland | 7
Denmark | 3
9 December
Latvia | 4
Slovakia | 6

5th-place game
10 December
Poland | 4
Slovakia | 7
7th-place game
10 December
Denmark | 4
Latvia | 6

=== 5–8th-place game ===
| 9 December 2023; 11:00 | Latvia | 4–6 (0–2, 1–2, 3–2) | Slovakia | Indoor Stadium; Attendance: 173 |

Game reference
Emīlija Salaciete 20:35; Džeina Eglīte 47:50; Evelīna Garbare 57:24 (WG); Anna Ankudinova 58:57 (WG) / Goals / 00:26 Kristina Hudáková; 12:05, 33:14 (PP) Michaela Šponiarová; 22:42 Lenka Červená; 43:25 Paulína Hudáková; 49:28 Zuzana Mrázová

| 9 December 2023; 12:30 | Poland | 7–3 (0–0, 2–0, 5–3) | Denmark | OCBC Arena 1 Attendance: 168 |

Game reference
Hanna Samson 25:56 (PP), 39:29; Gabriela Wójcik 44:32 (PP); Malwina Zagórska 45:51, 55:01 (EN); Maja Helman 52:46, 59:59 / Goals / 40:34, 58:28 Sofia Vestergaard Frederiksen; 48:31 Esther Juul Thomsen

=== 7th-place game ===
| 10 December 2023; 20:00 | Denmark | 4–6 (1–0, 2–2, 1–4) | Latvia | Indoor Stadium; Attendance: 317 |

Game reference
Sofia Vestergaard Frederiksen 01:39; Sophine Bergen Jørgensen 20:22; Lina Voldby 30:18; Therese Anna Gabrielsson 54:07 / Goals / 23:54 Evelīna Garbare; 24:17 Emīlija Salaciete; 47:45, 52:16, 59:17 Simona Grāpēna; 58:04 Annija Dārta Dankfelde

=== 5th-place game ===
| 10 December 2023; 13:00 | Poland | 4–7 (0–3, 1–2, 3–2) | Slovakia | Indoor Stadium; Attendance: 761 |

Game reference
Maja Helman 28:19, 47:04; Hanna Samson 43:46 (WG); Zuzanna Krzywak 57:29 (WG) / Goals / 01:50 Daniela Hrabovská; 05:04, 21:44 Laura Chúpeková; 07:14 Lenka Červená; 35:56 Michaela Žikavská; 54:21 Linda Pudišová; 56:58 Kristina Hudáková

== Final ranking ==
| 1st place, gold medalist(s) | Sweden |
| 2nd place, silver medalist(s) | Finland |
| 3rd place, bronze medalist(s) | Czech Republic |
| 4 | Switzerland |
| 5 | Slovakia |
| 6 | Poland |
| 7 | Latvia |
| 8 | Denmark |
| 9 | Japan |
| 10 | Germany |
| 11 | Norway |
| 12 | Singapore |
| 13 | Estonia |
| 14 | United States |
| 15 | France |
| 16 | Australia |

=== Qualification for the 2025 World Games ===
| # | Europe | Asia–Oceania |
|---|---|---|
| 1 | Sweden | Singapore |
| 2 | Finland | Thailand |
| 3 | Czech Republic | |
| 4 | Switzerland | |
| 5 | Slovakia | |

== Awards ==
=== Golden shoe ===
- (Finland) Veera Kauppi

=== Team of the tournament ===
- (Sweden) Moa Andersson
- (Finland) My Kippilä
- (Switzerland) Lara Heini
- (Finland) Veera Kauppi
- (Sweden) Wilma Johansson
- (Finland) Oona Kauppi
