= 2017 Women's World Floorball Championships =

Floorball competition

Tournament details
- Host country: Slovakia
- Venue(s): 2 (in 1 host city)
- Dates: December 1–9
- Teams: 16

Final positions
- Champions: Sweden (8th title)
- Runner-up: Finland
- Third place: Switzerland

Tournament statistics
- Matches played: 48
- Goals scored: 535 (11.15 per match)
- Attendance: 31,849 (664 per match)
- Scoring leader(s): (Slovakia) Paulína Hudáková (27 points)

Awards
- MVP: (Sweden) Emelie Wibron

The 2017 Women's World Floorball Championships was the 11th World Championships in women's floorball. The tournament took place in Bratislava in Slovakia between 1–9 December 2017. Sixteen teams participated and the competition was won by Sweden.

== Qualification ==
All teams, apart from the host country (Slovakia), will have to qualify for the Final Round via the qualifications, and there will be a total of 6 qualification groups - one in the Americas, one in Asia-Oceania and four in Europe. Thailand participated in the women's event for the first-ever time.

	Date	Venue	Vacancies	Qualified
European Qualification 1	1–5 February 2017	(Spain) Madrid	3	Sweden; Norway; Denmark
European Qualification 2	1–5 February 2017	(Italy) Celano	2	Finland; Poland
European Qualification 3	1–5 February 2017	(Italy) Celano	3	Switzerland; Germany; Estonia
European Qualification 4	1–5 February 2017	(Spain) Madrid	2	Czech Republic; Latvia
Asia and Oceania Qualification	31 January – 5 February 2017	(New Zealand) Wellington	4	Australia; Singapore; Thailand; Japan
Americas Qualification	3–4 February 2017	(Canada) Markham	1	United States
Total			15	

== Venues ==
The games of the 2017 Floorball World Championship will take place in Bratislava in the Ondrej Nepela Arena and in HANT Arena.

Bratislava	Bratislava
Ondrej Nepela Arena; Capacity: 10,055	HANT Arena; Capacity: 4,500

== Preliminary round ==
Team advanced to quarter-finals
Team advanced to playoff round
Team advanced to 13th-16th place playoff

=== Group A ===
Team	Pld	W	D	L	GF	GA	GD	Pts
Finland	3	3	0	0	27	3	+24	6
Czech Republic	3	2	0	1	17	8	+9	4
Norway	3	1	0	2	4	20	−16	2
Latvia	3	0	0	3	6	23	−17	0

1 December 2017; 15:15	Czech Republic	8–3 (4–3, 2–0, 2–0)	Latvia	HANT Arena, Bratislava; Attendance: 170

Game reference

	0–1	01:27 – Paula Egle
	0–2	06:45 – Anna Ankudinova
	0–3	07:46 – Elīza Elizabete Bērziņa
Martina Čapková – 13:36	1–3
Nela Kapcová – 16:09	2–3
Denisa Ratajová – 19:38	3–3
Tereza Urbánková – 19:53	4–3
Nela Jiráková – 34:30	5–3
Nela Jiráková – 39:17	6–3
Tereza Urbánková – 46:05	7–3
Michaela Mlejnková – 47:49	8–3

2 min
Penalties
2 min

2 December 2017; 09:30	Norway	3–2 (2–2, 0–0, 1–0)	Latvia	Ondrej Nepela Arena, Bratislava; Attendance: 101

Game reference

Lena Gillberg – 00:48	1–0
	1–1	07:06 – Līga Garklāva
Tone Einstulen – 07:29	2–1
	2–2	14:17 – Evelīna Garbare
Julie Gidske – 51:17	3–2

2 min
Penalties
4 min

2 December 2017; 16:00	Finland	5–1 (1–0, 1–0, 3–1)	Czech Republic	HANT Arena, Bratislava; Attendance: 1,089

Game reference

Elina Kujala – 06:05	1–0
Laura Manninen – 33:39	2–0
Mira Wickman – 44:29	3–0
	3–1	48:46 – Eliška Krupnová
Karoliina Kujala (ENG) – 58:17	4–1
Mia Karjalainen – 58:27	5–1

0 min
Penalties
0 min

3 December 2017; 16:00	Finland	10–1 (4–1, 3–0, 3–0)	Norway	Ondrej Nepela Arena, Bratislava; Attendance: 434

Game reference

Jenna Sarrio – 03:11	1–0
Veera Kauppi (PP) – 04:22	2–0
Elina Kujala – 07:03	3–0
Elina Kujala – 09:17	4–0
	4–1	12:29 – Julie Gidske (PP)
Ella Alanko – 23:18	5–1
Veera Kauppi – 24:00	6–1
Karoliina Kujala – 27:49	7–1
Veera Kauppi – 43:44	8–1
Silja Eskelinen – 53:25	9–1
Veera Kauppi – 54:29	10–1

4 min
Penalties
4 min

4 December 2017; 14:00	Latvia	1–12 (0–4, 1–4, 0–4)	Finland	Ondrej Nepela Arena, Bratislava; Attendance: 243

Game reference

	0–1	03:41 – Mia Karajalainen
	0–2	06:39 – Veera Kauppi
	0–3	08:51 – Karoliina Kujala
	0–4	10:22 – Jenna Saario
	0–5	21:06 – Laura Manninen
	0–6	29:13 – Veera Kauppi
	0–7	29:44 – Katri Luomaniemi
Diāna Isjomina – 30:09	1–7
	1–8	35:50 – Ella Alanko
	1–9	50:21 – Nina Rantala (PP)
	1–10	51:09 – Karoliina Kujala
	1–11	56:42 – Mira Wickman (PP)
	1–12	59:32 – Veera Kauppi

6 min
Penalties
2 min

4 December 2017; 17:30	Norway	0–8 (0–1, 0–5, 0–2)	Czech Republic	Ondrej Nepela Arena, Bratislava; Attendance: 338

Game reference

0–1	17:51 – Nela Kapcová
0–2	25:44 – Eliška Krupnová
0–3	28:36 – Eliška Krupnová
0–4	30:11 – Denisa Billá
0–5	37:41 – Tereza Urbánková
0–6	39:07 – Martina Řepková
0–7	48:54 – Denisa Billá
0–8	53:37 – Magdaléna Plášková

0 min
Penalties
2 min

=== Group B ===
Team	Pld	W	D	L	GF	GA	GD	Pts
Sweden	3	3	0	0	52	7	+45	6
Switzerland	3	2	0	1	31	13	+18	4
Poland	3	1	0	2	8	31	−23	2
Germany	3	0	0	3	2	42	−40	0

1 December 2017; 15:00	Germany	2–23 (0–8, 2–6, 0–9)	Sweden	Ondrej Nepela Arena, Bratislava; Attendance: 315

Game reference

	0–1	00:28 – Anna Wijk
	0–2	04:26 – (Own goal)
	0–3	07:08 – Alice Granstedt
	0–4	08:47 – Sofia Joelsson
	0–5	12:37 – Frida Norström
	0–6	13:50 – Sofia Joelsson
	0–7	15:10 – Malin Andreason
	0–8	17:06 – Moa Tschöp
	0–9	20:50 – Sofia Joelsson
Randi Kleerbaum – 26:09	1–9
	1–10	27:57 – Isabell Krantz
	1–11	31:04 – Moa Tschöp (ESH)
Alena Holst – 34:07	2–11
	2–12	34:42 – Johanna Hultgren
	2–13	35:09 – Stephanie Boberg
	2–14	36:00 – Malin Andreason
	2–15	42:33 – Ellen Rasmussen
	2–16	46:52 – Cornelia Fjellstedt
	2–17	49:37 – Sara Steen
	2–18	51:07 – Emelie Wibron
	2–19	52:32 – Ellen Rasmussen
	2–20	53:47 – Amanda Delgado Johansson
	2–21	55:37 – Emelie Wibron
	2–22	56:32 – Stephanie Boberg
	2–23	57:49 – Emelie Wibron

4 min
Penalties
4 min

2 December 2017; 13:30	Switzerland	14–1 (5–1, 4–0, 5–0)	Poland	Ondrej Nepela Arena, Bratislava; Attendance: 134

Game reference

Seraina Ulber – 00:59	1–0
Corin Rüttimann – 02:29	2–0
Margrit Scheidegger – 10:29	3–0
Andrea Gamperli – 11:33	4–0
Michelle Wiki – 12:30	5–0
	5–1	16:25 – Justyna Krzywak
Nathalie Spichiger – 21:36	6–1
Katrin Zwinggi – 23:41	7–1
Seraina Ulber – 27:03	8–1
Michelle Wiki – 39:44	9–1
Michelle Wiki – 46:54	10–1
Margrit Scheidegger – 47:58	11–1
Corin Rüttimann (PP) – 52:42	12–1
Margrit Scheidegger – 58:38	13–1
Michelle Wiki – 59:49	14–1

2 min
Penalties
4 min

3 December 2017; 15:30	Germany	0–14 (0–4, 0–6, 0–4)	Switzerland	HANT Arena, Bratislava; Attendance: 157

Game reference

0–1	02:26 – Andrea Gamperli
0–2	04:23 – Andrea Gamperli
0–3	07:29 – Seraina Ulber
0–4	12:57 – Michelle Wiki (PP)
0–5	20:35 – Flurina Marti
0–6	30:17 – Geraldine Rossier
0–7	30:43 – Katrin Zwinggi
0–8	33:07 – Nathalie Spichiger
0–9	36:04 – Seraina Ulber
0–10	39:56 –Geraldine Rossier
0–11	40:57 – Margrit Scheidegger
0–12	48:37 – (Own goal)
0–13	49:15 – Andrea Gamperli
0–14	49:28 – Seraina Ulber

6 min
Penalties
0 min

3 December 2017; 18:10	Sweden	17–2 (7–1, 6–0, 4–1)	Poland	HANT Arena, Bratislava; Attendance: 190

Game reference

Malin Andreason – 02:33	1–0
Malin Andreason – 05:35	2–0
Emelie Wibron – 09:52	3–0
Sara Steen – 10:53	4–0
Amanda Delgado Johansson – 15:33	5–0
Johanna Hultgren – 15:44	6–0
Ellen Rasmussen – 16:19	7–0
	7–1	18:25 – Justyna Krzywak
Johanna Hultgren – 21:59	8–1
Cornelia Fjellstedt – 24:04	9–1
Alice Granstedt – 24:24	10–1
Adina Augustsson – 32:10	11–1
Johanna Hultgren – 34:43	12–1
Jennifer Stalhult – 35:57	13–1
	13–2	42:11 – Justyna Krzywak
Jennifer Stalhult – 45:53	14–2
Ellen Rasmussen – 52:08	15–2
Frida Norstrom – 58:51	16–2
Emelie Wibron – 59:17	17–2

0 min
Penalties
4 min

4 December 2017; 11:30	Poland	5–0 (3–0, 0–0, 2–0)	Germany	HANT Arena, Bratislava; Attendance: 417

Game reference

Zuzanna Krzywak – 01:39	1–0
Weronika Noga – 06:07	2–0
Zuzanna Krzywak – 12:27	3–0
Zuzanna Krzywak – 45:00	4–0
Zuzanna Krzywak – 57:03	5–0

0 min
Penalties
2 min

4 December 2017; 15:40	Sweden	12–3 (5–2, 5–1, 2–0)	Switzerland	HANT Arena, Bratislava; Attendance: 227

Game reference

Sara Steen – 00:29	1–0
Ellen Rasmussen – 00:53	2–0
Stephanie Boberg – 05:42	3–0
	3–1	08:59 – Corin Rüttimann
Moa Tschöp – 09:36	4–1
	4–2	16:34 – Michelle Wiki
Sofia Joelsson – 19:00	5–2
Isabell Krantz – 22:01	6–2
Emelie Wibron – 24:18	7–2
Sofia Joelsson – 24:54	8–2
	8–3	37:07 – Isabelle Gerig
Moa Tschöp – 39:10	9–3
Ida Sundberg – 39:50	10–3
Sofia Joelsson (PP) – 47:11	11–3
Emelie Wibron – 57:04	12–3

2 min
Penalties
4 min

=== Group C ===
Team	Pld	W	D	L	GF	GA	GD	Pts
Slovakia	3	3	0	0	43	6	+37	6
Estonia	3	2	0	1	23	18	+5	4
Singapore	3	0	1	2	11	27	−16	1
Australia	3	0	1	2	10	36	−26	1

1 December 2017; 18:00	Slovakia	12–2 (2–1, 4–0, 6–1)	Singapore	Ondrej Nepela Arena, Bratislava; Attendance: 741

Game reference

	0–1	11:09 – Ong Hui Hui
Katarína Klapitová – 18:08	1–1
Andrea Šidlová – 19:51	2–1
Denisa Ferenčíková – 20:28	3–1
Denisa Ferenčíková – 24:28	4–1
Denisa Ferenčíková – 25:49	5–1
Paulína Hudáková – 39:53	6–1
Lucia Košturiaková – 40:20	7–1
Paulína Hudáková – 43:47	8–1
Lucia Košturiaková – 46:23	9–1
	9–2	49:33 – Wilna Tan
Michaela Šponiarová – 51:09	10–2
Paulína Hudáková – 53:05	11–2
Kristína Hudáková – 59:47	12–2

0 min
Penalties
0 min

1 December 2017; 19:30	Estonia	10–4 (5–2, 3–1, 2–1)	Australia	HANT Arena, Bratislava; Attendance: 117

Game reference

Edith Parnik – 03:11	1–0
	1–1	09:34 – Carolyn Margetts
	1–2	10:44 – Blase Hodges
Triin Pahn – 14:09	2–2
Kati Kutisaar – 14:33	3–2
Judith Hyvarinen – 14:52	4–2
Margit Keerutaja – 16:37	5–2
	5–3	23:42 – Tayla Hull
(Own goal) – 28:58	6–3
Kati Kutisaar – 34:27	7–3
Edith Parnik – 38:59	8–3
Edith Parnik – 47:27	9–3
	9–4	48:12 – Tara Meyer
Merli Suvari – 58:31	10–4

2 min
Penalties
4 min

2 December 2017; 11:30	Singapore	5–5 (1–2, 1–1, 3–2)	Australia	HANT Arena, Bratislava; Attendance: 157

Game reference

Jowie Tan – 04:41	1–0
	1–1	05:37 – Tara Meyer
	1–2	17:10 – Vanessa Dwyer
	1–3	27:02 – Amanda Bartrim
Jill Quek – 33:00	2–3
	2–4	40:42 – Yasmin Skene
Syafizah Safii – 43:57	3–4
Mindy Lim – 47:11	4–4
	4–5	50:41 – Fiona Cameron
Debbie Poh – 58:45	5–5

0 min
Penalties
0 min

2 December 2017; 17:30	Slovakia	10–3 (2–1, 5–2, 3–0)	Estonia	Ondrej Nepela Arena, Bratislava; Attendance: 1,858

Game reference

	0–1	06:05 – Edith Parnik
Paulína Hudáková – 15:31	1–1
Patrícia Mária Dzurinová – 18:13	2–1
Lucia Košturiaková – 21:04	3–1
Paulína Hudáková – 22:02	4–1
	4–2	27:17 – Reti Vaart
	4–3	30:12 – Diana Klavan
Paulína Hudáková – 33:51	5–3
Denisa Ferenčíková – 35:22	6–3
Paulína Hudáková – 39:56	7–3
Alzbeta Ďuríková – 43:24	8–3
Šárka Boľová – 54:45	9–3
Lucia Košturiaková – 56:12	10–3

0 min
Penalties
4 min

3 December 2017; 09:30	Singapore	4–10 (1–7, 1–2, 2–1)	Estonia	Ondrej Nepela Arena, Bratislava; Attendance: 144

Game reference

Natalia Wee – 00:12	1–0
	1–1	02:07 – Edith Parnik
	1–2	03:03 – Marii Kangur
	1–3	04:53 – Kati Kutisaar
	1–4	05:54 – Reti Vaart
	1–5	15:28 – Kati Kutisaar
	1–6	15:57 – Reti Vaart
	1–7	17:13 – Sirli Nellis
	1–8	28:09 – Edith Parnik
	1–9	33:09 – Judith Hyvarinen
Michelle Lok – 35:53	2–9
Teresa Quek – 53:00	3–9
Ong Hui Hui (PP) – 54:53	4–9
	4–10	59:35 – Berit Oll

0 min
Penalties
4 min

3 December 2017; 13:30	Australia	1–21 (0–3, 1–8, 0–10)	Slovakia	Ondrej Nepela Arena, Bratislava; Attendance: 1,912

Game reference

	0–1	03:21 – Šárka Boľová
	0–2	06:33 – Viktória Bobotová (DP)
	0–3	12:19 – Jana Trošková
	0–4	22:05 – Andrea Sidlova
Tayla Hull (SH) – 24:58	1–4
	1–5	29:26 – Katarína Klapitová
	1–6	34:29 – Denisa Ferenčíková
	1–7	35:15 – Denisa Ferenčíková
	1–8	37:19 – Lenka Cupráková
	1–9	37:51 – Michaela Šponiarová
	1–10	38:48 – Lucia Košturiaková
	1–11	39:01 – Šárka Boľová
	1–12	40:25 – Paulína Hudáková
	1–13	40:45 – Viktória Grossová
	1–14	46:48 – Michaela Šponiarová
	1–15	49:39 – Lucia Košturiaková
	1–16	50:29 – Lucia Košturiaková
	1–17	50:41 – Šárka Boľová
	1–18	53:00 – Denisa Ferenčíková
	1–19	55:08 – Monika Pintérová
	1–20	57:37 – Denisa Ferenčíková
	1–21	58:50 – Lucia Košturiaková

2 min
Penalties
4 min

=== Group D ===
Team	Pld	W	D	L	GF	GA	GD	Pts
Denmark	3	3	0	0	28	7	+21	6
United States	3	2	0	1	17	17	0	4
Japan	3	1	0	2	12	19	−7	2
Thailand	3	0	0	3	11	25	−14	0

1 December 2017; 09:30	Denmark	11–2 (2–0, 2–1, 7–1)	Thailand	Ondrej Nepela Arena, Bratislava; Attendance: 249

Game reference

Cecilia Di Nardo – 03:59	1–0
Nanna Sørensen – 15:26	2–0
	2–1	20:20 – Tikhamporn Sakunpithak
Nanna Sørensen – 33:57	3–1
Klara Fjorder – 35:12	4–1
Cecilia Di Nardo – 40:45	5–1
Lina Voldby – 45:11	6–1
	6–2	48:37 – Jennifer Bergase
Laura de Fries – 49:45	7–2
Mathilde Christensen – 50:17	8–2
Anne Sofie Thaarup – 55:08	9–2
Klara Fjorder – 57:12	10–2
Nanna Sørensen (SH) – 59:50	11–2

6 min
Penalties
0 min

1 December 2017; 11:30	Japan	4–6 (1–3, 1–1, 2–2)	United States	HANT Arena, Bratislava; Attendance: 181

Game reference

	0–1	04:24 – Tiffany Gerber
Yui Goto – 02:25	1–1
	1–2	14:36 – Marie Haggstrom
	1–3	19:36 – Christine Lindberg
Yui Takahashi – 35:31	2–3
	2–4	35:54 – Michelle Linhart
Yui Goto (PS) – 41:40	3–4
Natsumi Yokota (PP) – 43:00	4–4
	4–5	48:39 – Marie Haggstrom
	4–6	49:40 – Michelle Linhart

4 min
Penalties
6 min

2 December 2017; 19:30	Japan	3–11 (1–2, 0–2, 2–7)	Denmark	HANT Arena, Bratislava; Attendance: 208

Game reference

Yui Goto – 10:01	1–0
	1–1	13:40 – Emma Vistisen
	1–2	16:14 – Klara Fjorder
	1–3	26:23 – Cecilia Di Nardo
	1–4	38:44 – Maria Helander
	1–5	45:04 – Cecilia Di Nardo
	1–6	45:26 – Anne Sofie Thaarup
	1–7	46:06 – Cecilia Di Nardo
	1–8	46:32 – Klara Fjorder
	1–9	50:41 – Laura de Fries
	1–10	52:49 – Maria Helander
Hitomi Sugaya – 53:02	2–10
Mahiro Shimizu – 54:39	3–10
	3–11	58:24 – Simone Jørgensen

0 min
Penalties
2 min

3 December 2017; 11:30	United States	9–7 (4–3, 4–1, 1–3)	Thailand	HANT Arena, Bratislava; Attendance: 143

Game reference

	0–1	00:29 – Sirinan Boonbut
	0–2	07:54 – Sirinan Boonbut
Michelle Linhart (PP) – 12:00	1–2
Marie Haggstrom (PP) – 12:32	2–2
Michelle Linhart – 14:49	3–2
Victoria Lindstrom – 16:25	4–2
	4–3	17:55 – Onuma Doungsuda
Victoria Lindstrom – 29:56	5–3
Marie Haggstrom – 30:29	6–3
Michelle Linhart – 34:00	7–3
	7–4	36:08 – Thanaporn Tongkham (PP)
Christine Lindberg (SH) – 39:59	8–4
Marie Haggstrom – 42:43	9–4
	9–5	45:34 – Sirinan Boonbut
	9–6	53:19 – Tikhamporn Sakunpithak
	9–7	57:23 – Sirinan Boonbut

4 min
Penalties
5 min

4 December 2017; 09:30	Thailand	2–5 (1–1, 0–1, 1–3)	Japan	Ondrej Nepela Arena, Bratislava; Attendance: 477

Game reference

Tikhamporn Sakunpithak – 02:25	1–0
	1–1	10:22 – Rei Goto
	1–2	33:49 – Yui Goto
	1–3	56:20 – Yui Takahashi
Thanaporn Tongkham – 57:12	2–3
	2–4	59:15 – Hitomi Sugaya (ENG)
	2–5	59:47 – Natsumi Yokota

2 min
Penalties
2 min

4 December 2017; 19:30	United States	2–6 (1–2, 1–4, 0–0)	Denmark	HANT Arena, Bratislava; Attendance: 87

Game reference

Michelle Linhart – 10:07	1–0
	1–1	14:56 – Cecilia Di Nardo
	1–2	18:45 – Cecilia Di Nardo
	1–3	25:22 – Laura de Fries
	1–4	26:13 – Klara Fjorder
	1–5	29:40 – Cecilia Di Nardo
	1–6	31:53 – Laura de Fries
Marie Haggstrom – 37:59	2–6

0 min
Penalties
4 min

== Knockout stage ==
Playoff round 5 December
Latvia	4
Denmark	1
Poland	6
Estonia	1
Germany	3
Slovakia	7
Norway	5
United States	4

Quarterfinals; 6–7 December
Sweden	21
Latvia	0
Czech Republic	10
Poland	4
Finland	6
Slovakia	2
Switzerland	10
Norway	1

Semifinals; 8 December
Sweden	7
Czech Republic	1
Finland	3
Switzerland	1

Final; 9 December
Sweden (p.s.o.)	6
Finland	5
Third place
Czech Republic	2
Switzerland	3

=== Playoff round ===
5 December 2017; 10:00	Poland	6–1 (2–1, 2–0, 2–0)	Estonia	Ondrej Nepela Arena, Bratislava; Attendance: 325

Game reference

(Own goal) – 03:00	1–0
	1–1	03:36 – Reti Vaart
Agata Plechan – 19:16	2–1
Elżbieta Piotrowska – 22:56	3–1
Justyna Krzywak (SH) – 24:30	4–1
Justyna Krzywak (SH, ENG) – 57:54	5–1
Elżbieta Piotrowska – 58:39	6–1

6 min
Penalties
0 min

5 December 2017; 13:00	Latvia	4–1 (1–0, 2–0, 1–1)	Denmark	Ondrej Nepela Arena, Bratislava; Attendance: 112

Game reference

Līga Garklāva – 13:25	1–0
Evelīna Garbare – 29:17	2–0
Gunita Kārkliņa – 37:11	3–0
Zeltīte Bankava – 46:39	4–0
	4–1	49:41 – Cecilia Di Nardo

8 min
Penalties
6 min

5 December 2017; 16:00	Germany	3–7 (1–2, 1–3, 1–2)	Slovakia	Ondrej Nepela Arena, Bratislava; Attendance: 2,031

Game reference

	0–1	02:07 – Denisa Ferenčíková
	0–2	07:11 – Lucia Košturiaková
Riccarda Schimanski – 08:58	1–2
Laura Neumann – 25:01	2–2
	2–3	26:41 – Lucia Košturiaková (PP)
	2–4	35:27 – Michaela Šponiarová
	2–5	39:11 – Katarína Klapitová
	2–6	45:07 – Lucia Košturiaková
Laura Neumann – 57:21	3–6
	3–7	59:20 – Lenka Cupráková

2 min
Penalties
2 min

5 December 2017; 19:00	Norway	5–4 (2–2, 3–0, 0–2)	United States	Ondrej Nepela Arena, Bratislava; Attendance: 145

Game reference

Karen Farnes – 02:54	1–0
	1–1	11:43 – Michelle Linhart
	1–2	15:52 – Michelle Linhart
Mia Osterhaug – 16:47	2–2
Karen Farnes – 20:24	3–2
Henriette Knudsen – 31:17	4–2
Karen Farnes – 35:25	5–2
	5–3	41:11 – Christine Lindberg
	5–4	43:32 – Marie Haggstrom

0 min
Penalties
0 min

=== Quarterfinals ===
6 December 2017; 16:10	Sweden	21–0 (7–0, 7–0, 7–0)	Latvia	Ondrej Nepela Arena, Bratislava; Attendance: 234

Game reference

Stephanie Boberg – 00:24	1–0
Sofia Joelsson – 01:29	2–0
Alice Granstedt – 03:43	3–0
Emelie Wibron – 11:17	4–0
Moa Tschöp – 15:09	5–0
Stephanie Boberg – 19:33	6–0
Moa Tschöp – 19:56	7–0
Amanda Delgado Johansson – 25:40	8–0
Anna Wijk – 30:09	9–0
Amanda Delgado Johansson – 31:01	10–0
Malin Andreason – 31:39	11–0
Emelie Wibron (PP) – 34:11	12–0
Anna Wijk – 35:21	13–0
Iza Rydfjall – 38:58	14–0
Anna Wijk – 41:22	15–0
Adina Augustsson – 42:54	16–0
Emelie Wibron – 43:52	17–0
Moa Tschöp – 45:09	18–0
Emelie Wibron – 45:40	19–0
Sara Steen – 45:53	20–0
Anna Wijk – 53:39	21–0

0 min
Penalties
2 min

6 December 2017; 19:00	Czech Republic	10–4 (5–0, 1–2, 4–2)	Poland	Ondrej Nepela Arena, Bratislava; Attendance: 337

Game reference

Hana Koníčková (PP) – 08:53	1–0
Nela Kapcová – 09:29	2–0
Nela Kapcová – 11:55	3–0
Michaela Mlejnková – 15:11	4–0
Veronika Enenkelová – 15:22	5–0
	5–1	24:44 – Katarzyna Rogala
Tereza Urbánková – 30:58	6–1
	6–2	33:31 – Katarzyna Fuła
	6–3	40:40 – Anna Raczkowska
Nela Jiráková – 43:41	7–3
Hana Koníčková – 55:20	8–3
	8–4	55:36 – Justyna Krzywak
Nela Kapcová – 55:53	9–4
Magdaléna Plášková – 56:17	10–4

4 min
Penalties
2 min

7 December 2017; 17:00	Finland	6–2 (2–2, 1–0, 3–0)	Slovakia	Ondrej Nepela Arena, Bratislava; Attendance: 3,856

Game reference

	0–1	07:04 – Paulína Hudáková
Nina Rantala (PP) – 09:42	1–1
	1–2	10:18 – Lenka Cupráková
Hanna Sipilainen (PP) – 15:40	2–2
Jenna Saario – 33:21	3–2
Eliisa Alanko – 48:00	4–2
Veera Kauppi – 51:54	5–2
Eliisa Alanko – 59:52	6–2

2 min
Penalties
8 min

7 December 2017; 20:00	Switzerland	10–1 (2–1, 4–0, 4–0)	Norway	Ondrej Nepela Arena, Bratislava; Attendance: 243

Game reference

Nadia Reinhard – 05:39	1–0
	1–1	10:08 – Julie Gidske
Tanja Stella – 11:39	2–1
Isabelle Gerig – 21:38	3–1
Michelle Wiki – 23:12	4–1
Corin Rüttimann – 29:45	5–1
Michelle Wiki – 39:08	6–1
Corin Rüttimann – 45:26	7–1
Michelle Wiki – 52:31	8–1
Michelle Wiki – 55:08	9–1
Nadia Reinhard – 57:16	10–1

2 min
Penalties
0 min

=== Semifinals ===
8 December 2017; 17:00	Finland	3–1 (0–0, 1–0, 2–1)	Switzerland	Ondrej Nepela Arena, Bratislava; Attendance: 1,313

Game reference

My Kippilä – 34:40	1–0
Nina Rantala – 44:11	2–0
	2–1	52:47 – Corin Rüttimann (PP)
My Kippilä (PS) – 59:46	3–1

2 min
Penalties
4 min

8 December 2017; 20:10	Sweden	7–1 (4–0, 2–0, 1–1)	Czech Republic	Ondrej Nepela Arena, Bratislava; Attendance: 1,305

Game reference

Emelie Wibron – 01:37	1–0
Stephanie Boberg – 12:31	2–0
Sofia Joelsson – 13:41	3–0
Sofia Joelsson – 19:07	4–0
Alice Granstedt – 26:43	5–0
Stephanie Boberg – 27:55	6–0
	6–1	53:06 – Martina Řepková
Cornelia Fjellstedt – 57:06	7–1

2 min
Penalties
2 min

=== Bronze-medal game ===
9 December 2017; 14:15	Czech Republic	2–3 (0–0, 2–1, 0–2)	Switzerland	Ondrej Nepela Arena, Bratislava; Attendance: 2,508

Game reference

Referees:
(Finland) Tom Kirjonen
(Finland) Jyrki Sirkka

Eliška Krupnová – 20:24	1–0
	1–1	25:30 – Corin Rüttimann
Dominika Kubišová – 31:20	2–1
	2–2	47:55 – Corin Rüttimann
	2–3	49:46 – Corin Rüttimann (PS)

4 min
Penalties
2 min

=== Final ===
9 December 2017; 17:05	Sweden	6–5 PSO (2–1, 2–1, 1–3); 0–0 OT; 2–1 PSO	Finland	Ondrej Nepela Arena, Bratislava; Attendance: 3,664

Game reference

Referees:
(Czech Republic) Martin Reichelt
(Czech Republic) Tomáš Kostinek

Sofia Joelsson – 09:07	1–0
	1–1	10:15 – Veera Kauppi
Sara Steen – 15:05	2–1
Amanda Johansson – 23:00	3–1
Amanda Johansson – 29:24	4–1
	4–2	38:46 – Nina Rantala (PP)
	4–3	48:05 – Oona Kauppi (PP)
	4–4	50:03 – Veera Kauppi
Moa Tschöp – 57:35 (PP)	5–4
	5–5	58:47 – Veera Kauppi (WG)

6 min
Penalties
4 min

== Placement round ==
=== 13th–16th-place semifinals ===
5 December 2017; 11:30	Japan	5–4 (1–1, 1–0, 3–3)	Australia	HANT Arena, Bratislava; Attendance: 280

Game reference

Yui Goto – 03:04	1–0
	1–1	14:25 – (Own goal)
Mahiro Shimizu – 32:54	2–1
Yui Goto – 40:32	3–1
Rin Ozawa – 47:47	4–1
Mahiro Shimizu – 52:49	5–1
	5–2	54:20 – Tara Meyer
	5–3	57:10 – Blaise Hodges
	5–4	58:43 – Ruby Wright

0 min
Penalties
2 min

5 December 2017; 15:30	Singapore	5–6 (1–1, 1–2, 3–3)	Thailand	HANT Arena, Bratislava; Attendance: 47

Game reference

	0–1	03:14 – Sirinan Boonbut
Shannon Yeo – 07:25	1–1
	1–2	26:01 – Sirinan Boonbut
	1–3	28:10 – Sirinan Boonbut (PP)
Jill Quek – 28:28	2–3
	2–4	46:10 – Nina Suppa
Jill Quek – 50:00	3–4
Ong Hui Hui (DP) – 52:47	4–4
	4–5	59:01 – Sirinan Boonbut
	4–6	59:04 – Tikhamporn Sakunpithak (ENG)
Shannon Yeo (WG) – 59:58	5–6

6 min
Penalties
6 min

=== 9th–12th-place semifinals ===
6 December 2017; 11:30	Estonia	2–4 (0–0, 0–3, 2–1)	Denmark	HANT Arena, Bratislava; Attendance: 210

Game reference

	0–1	23:39 – Klara Fjorder
	0–2	28:25 – Laura de Fries
	0–3	35:43 – Klara Fjorder (PP)
Diana Klavan – 42:26	1–3
	1–4	47:33 – Nanna Sørensen
Reti Vaart – 51:42	2–4

8 min
Penalties
6 min

6 December 2017; 15:30	United States	7–10 (1–4, 4–2, 2–4)	Germany	HANT Arena, Bratislava; Attendance: 187

Game reference

	0–1	01:42 – Vanessa Weikum
	0–2	08:36 – Randi Kleerbaum
	0–3	16:16 – Lisa Merle Entelmann
	0–4	17:44 – Vanessa Weikum
Christine Lindberg – 17:51	1–4
Marie Haggstrom – 21:34	2–4
	2–5	22:33 – Franziska Kuhlmann
Michelle Linhart – 27:35	3–5
Tiffany Gerber – 36:07	4–5
	4–6	37:36 – Jessica Schulz
Michelle Linhart – 39:57	5–6
	5–7	44:57 – Pauline Baumgarten
	5–8	45:34 – Anna-Lena Best
	5–9	47:40 – Anna-Lena Best
Michelle Linhart (SH) – 49:35	6–9
Marie Haggstrom – 57:27	7–9
	7–10	59:24 – Anne-Marie Mietz (ENG)

2 min
Penalties
4 min

=== 5th–8th-place semifinals ===
8 December 2017; 10:00	Latvia	5–1 (0–0, 2–0, 3–1)	Poland	Ondrej Nepela Arena, Bratislava; Attendance: 409

Game reference

Evelīna Garbare – 33:01	1–0
Evelīna Garbare – 35:25	2–0
Laura Gaugere – 42:54	3–0
	3–1	43:02 – Weronika Noga
Līga Garklāva (PP) – 48:54	4–1
Evelīna Garbare – 50:00	5–1

0 min
Penalties
2 min

8 December 2017; 13:00	Slovakia	7–4 (1–3, 4–1, 2–0)	Norway	Ondrej Nepela Arena, Bratislava; Attendance: 732

Game reference

	0–1	05:46 – Emilie Thorvaldsen
Michaela Šponiarová (PP) – 11:49	1–1
	1–2	15:55 – Hildegun Holm
	1–3	18:45 – Charlotta Hjort
Michaela Šponiarová – 22:38	2–3
Denisa Ferenčíková (PP) – 25:32	3–3
	3–4	30:19 – Tone Einstulen
Paulína Hudáková – 34:49	4–4
Paulína Hudáková – 35:23	5–4
Katarína Klapitová – 58:19	6–4
Lucia Košturiaková (ENG) – 59:45	7–4

0 min
Penalties
4 min

=== 15th-place game ===
6 December 2017; 10:00	Australia	4–3 (2–2, 0–0, 2–1)	Singapore	Ondrej Nepela Arena, Bratislava; Attendance: 341

Game reference

	0–1	01:52 – Shannon Yeo
	0–2	10:58 – Ong Hui Hui
Yasmin Skene – 11:12	1–2
Hannah Quaife (PP) – 15:48	2–2
Hannah Quaife – 44:05	3–2
Ruby Wright – 49:25	4–2
	4–3	56:29 – Natalia Wee

2 min
Penalties
2 min

=== 13th-place game ===
6 December 2017; 13:00	Japan	2–4 (1–2, 0–1, 1–1)	Thailand	Ondrej Nepela Arena, Bratislava; Attendance: 161

Game reference

	0–1	04:12 – Sirinan Boonbut
	0–2	15:59 – Nelly Johansson
Momoka Shimoyama – 18:59	1–2
	1–3	37:31 – Sirinan Boonbut
	1–4	42:50 – Nina Suppa
Yui Takahashi (PP) – 53:05	2–4

2 min
Penalties
2 min

=== 11th-place game ===
7 December 2017; 10:00	Estonia	8–7 OT (2–2, 2–1, 3–4); OT: 1–0	United States	Ondrej Nepela Arena, Bratislava; Attendance: 357

Game reference

Merli Suvari – 05:50	1–0
	1–1	12:01 – Selma Johansson
Katrin Kivirand – 13:00	2–1
	2–2	16:00 – Michelle Linhart
Kati Kutisaar – 22:36	3–2
	3–3	24:51 – Marie Haggstrom (PP)
Kati Kutisaar – 34:01	4–3
	4–4	43:03 – Marie Haggstrom
Edith Parnik – 43:14	5–4
	5–5	46:09 – Michelle Linhart
Merli Suvari – 49:21	6–5
	6–6	50:24 – Marie Haggstrom
	6–7	52:07 – Michelle Linhart
Reti Vaart (WG) – 59:57	7–7
Reti Vaart – 60:49	8–7

4 min
Penalties
0 min

=== 9th-place game ===
7 December 2017; 13:00	Denmark	4–3 (2–1, 0–1, 2–1)	Germany	Ondrej Nepela Arena, Bratislava; Attendance: 217

Game reference

	0–1	02:42 – Theresa Beppler-Alt
Laura de Fries – 05:35	1–1
Cecilia Di Nardo – 19:00	2–1
	2–2	31:44 – Randi Kleerbaum
Nanna Sørensen – 46:56	3–2
Mathilde Christensen – 48:25	4–2
	4–3	50:50 – Anne-Marie Mietz

2 min
Penalties
2 min

=== 7th-place game ===
9 December 2017; 08:30	Norway	3–12 (0–3, 2–5, 1–4)	Poland	Ondrej Nepela Arena, Bratislava; Attendance: 207

Game reference

	0–1	07:14 – Elżbieta Piotrowska
	0–2	07:35 – Agata Arendarczyk
	0–3	19:51 – Justyna Krzywak
	0–4	23:49 – Agata Arendarczyk
	0–5	24:41 – Justyna Krzywak
	0–6	28:13 – Joanna Szelzchen (DP)
	0–7	32:19 – Agata Plechan
Kristine Næss Haug – 33:37	1–7
Tone Einstulen – 33:58	2–7
	2–8	34:56 – Małgorzata Pazio
	2–9	43:02 – Magdalena Marek
	2–10	50:29 – Agata Arendarczyk
	2–11	54:32 – Agata Arendarczyk
Lena Gillberg – 58:12	3–11
	3–12	58:49 – (Own goal)

4 min
Penalties
0 min

=== 5th-place game ===
9 December 2017; 11:15	Slovakia	6–4 (2–0, 0–1, 4–3)	Latvia	Ondrej Nepela Arena, Bratislava; Attendance: 2,378

Game reference

Paulína Hudáková – 05:20	1–0
Michaela Šponiarová – 17:24	2–0
	2–1	27:53 – Zeltīte Bankava
Michaela Šponiarová – 43:15	3–1
	3–2	43:54 – Ieva Priede
	3–3	51:34 – Paula Egle
Kristína Hudáková – 54:13	4–3
Kristína Hudáková – 58:40	5–3
	5–4	59:41 – Līga Garklāva (WG)
Denisa Ferenčíková (ENG) – 59:46	6–4

0 min
Penalties
6 min

== Statistics ==
=== Scoring leaders ===
Pos	Player	Country	GP	G	A	Pts	PIM
1	Paulína Hudáková	Slovakia	7	12	15	27	2
2	Emelie Wibron	Sweden	6	12	13	25	2
3	Michelle Linhart	United States	6	14	7	21	2
4	Marie Haggstrom	United States	6	12	9	21	0
5	Denisa Ferenčíková	Slovakia	7	11	9	20	0
6	Veera Kauppi	Finland	6	11	6	17	0
7	Michaela Šponiarová	Slovakia	7	8	9	17	4
8	Moa Tschöp	Sweden	6	8	8	16	2
9	Lucia Košturiaková	Slovakia	7	12	3	15	0
10	Amanda Delgado Johansson	Sweden	6	6	9	15	2

GP = Games played; G = Goals; A = Assists; Pts = Points; PIM = Penalties In Minutes
Source: IFF

== Tournament awards ==
- MVP: (Sweden) Emelie Wibron
- Best goalkeeper: (Finland) Tiltu Siltanen
- Best defender: (Sweden) Moa Tschöp
- Best defender: (Finland) My Kippilä
- Best forward: (Sweden) Emelie Wibron
- Best centre: (Switzerland) Corin Rüttimann
- Best forward: (Slovakia) Paulína Hudáková

== Final ranking ==
1st place, gold medalist(s)	Sweden
2nd place, silver medalist(s)	Finland
3rd place, bronze medalist(s)	Switzerland
4	Czech Republic
5	Slovakia
6	Latvia
7	Poland
8	Norway
9	Denmark
10	Germany
11	Estonia
12	United States
13	Thailand
14	Japan
15	Australia
16	Singapore
