= Estonia women's national floorball team =

- IFF Ranking: 12th (2025)

Estonia women's national floorball team is the national team of Estonia. They played their first international match on 10 February 2007.

== History ==
The team participated in the Qualification to the B-Division for the 2007 Women's World Floorball Championship. The qualifiers were held in Wolsztyn, Poland and Kapfenberg, Austria. The team did not advance out of qualifiers. The team participated in the Qualification to the B-Division for the 2009 Women's World Floorball Championship. The qualifiers were held in Idrija, Slovenia. The team advanced and went on to finish fifth in the B-Division at the Västerås, Sweden hosted competition.

== World Championships ==
Year	Hosting Country	Rank
2017	Slovakia	11th place
2019	Switzerland	14th place
2021	Sweden	13th place
2023	Singapore	13th place
2025	Czech Republic	12th place
