= 2001 Women's World Floorball Championships =

Floorball competition

Tournament details
- Host country: Latvia
- Dates: 20–27 May
- Teams: 16

Final positions
- Champions: Finland (2nd title)
- Runner-up: Sweden
- Third place: Norway

Tournament statistics
- Matches played: 36
- Goals scored: 280 (7.78 per match)
- Attendance: 7,671 (213 per match)
- Scoring leader(s): Birgitte Lersbryggen (NOR) (7+6)

Awards
- MVP: Birgitte Lersbryggen (NOR)
- All statistics correct as of 2014-06-25.

The 2001 Women's World Floorball Championships was the third world championship in women's floorball. The games were played in Riga, Latvia 20–27 May 2001. Finland ended up as champions, thus they became the first team to win their second title. In the final-game Finland defeated Sweden, 2–0.

Great Britain, Hungary & Poland made their first appearances in the women's floorball world championships.

== Division A ==
The 8 teams of the first division consists of the 7 best placed teams from the highest division the previous tournament plus Austria, the winner of division B the previous tournament. As with both the earlier world championships, the top four positions were taken by Finland, Norway, Sweden and Switzerland with Finland as the champions. Austria lost the 7th place match versus Germany and was then relegated back to division B for the next tournament.

The two best placed teams in each group advances to the semifinals. The lower placed teams face up against the corresponding team from the other group for placement matches.

=== Group A ===
Team	Pld	W	D	L	GF	GA	GD	Pts
Finland	3	3	0	0	26	2	+24	6
Norway	3	2	0	1	16	2	+14	4
Czech Republic	3	1	0	2	8	12	−4	2
Austria	3	0	0	3	1	35	−34	0

20 May 2001
18:15

Finland

2–1
(1–1, 0–0, 1–0)

Norway

Riga

20 May 2001
20:30

Czech Republic

7–1
(1–0, 1–0, 5–1)

Austria

Riga

22 May 2001
13:00

Norway

12–0
(3–0, 3–0, 6–0)

Austria

Riga

22 May 2001
15:30

Finland

8–1
(4–0, 1–0, 3–1)

Czech Republic

Riga

24 May 2001
13:00

Czech Republic

0–3
(0–1, 0–1, 0–1)

Norway

Riga

24 May 2001
15:30

Austria

0–16
(0–2, 0–6, 0–8)

Finland

Riga

=== Group B ===
Team	Pld	W	D	L	GF	GA	GD	Pts
Sweden	3	3	0	0	30	2	+28	6
Switzerland	3	2	0	1	13	3	+10	4
Latvia	3	1	0	2	6	11	−5	2
Germany	3	0	0	3	1	34	−33	0

21 May 2001
18:15

Switzerland

1–2
(1–1, 0–0, 0–1)

Sweden

Riga

21 May 2001
20:30

Germany

0–5
(0–2, 0–1, 0–2)

Latvia

Riga

22 May 2001
18:00

Sweden

9–0
(1–0, 4–0, 4–0)

Latvia

Riga

22 May 2001
20:30

Switzerland

10–0
(2–0, 2–0, 6–0)

Germany

Riga

24 May 2001
18:00

Germany

1–19
(0–6, 1–8, 0–5)

Sweden

Riga

24 May 2001
20:30

Latvia

1–2
(0–0, 1–2, 0–0)

Switzerland

Riga

=== Final stage ===
Semifinals
A1	Finland	3
B2	Switzerland	2
B1	Sweden	4
A2	Norway	3

Finals
A1	Finland	2
B1	Sweden	0
Third place
B2	Switzerland	3
A2	Norway	4

25 May 2001
18:00

Germany

2–1
(1–0, 0–1, 1–0)

Austria

Riga

26 May 2001
13:00

Finland

3–2
(2–0, 0–0, 1–2)

Switzerland

Riga

26 May 2001
16:00

Sweden

4–3
(2–1, 0–0, 2–2)

Norway

Riga

27 May 2001
10:00

Czech Republic

4–4 (a.e.t)
(1–1, 2–1, 1–2, 0–0)
Pen: 1–0

Latvia

Riga

27 May 2001
12:30

Switzerland

3–4
(1–1, 2–0, 0–3)

Norway

Riga

27 May 2001
15:00

Finland

2–0
(0–0, 1–0, 1–0)

Sweden

Riga

=== Top scorers ===
	Player	G	A	P
1	Birgitte Lersbryggen (NOR)	7	6	13
2	Anna Gustafsson (SWE)	6	3	9
3	Hermine Dahlerus (SWE)	6	1	7
4	Jonna Kettunen (FIN)	5	2	7
5	Susann Simolin (FIN)	3	4	7
6	Mirca Anderegg (SUI)	3	3	6
7	Lena Birath (SWE)	1	5	6
8	Natalie Stadelmann (SUI); Ingrid Gigstad (NOR)	4	1	5
10	Camilla Granelid (SWE); Satu Schilcher (FIN)	3	2	5

== Division B ==
The second division consisted of the 4 bottom placed teams from the last tournament plus three new teams Great Britain, Hungary, Poland and Russia who were relegated from the top division following their withdrawal from the previous tournament. Russia did however get promoted back to the top division for the next tournament after a clean sweep, beating Denmark in the division final with 14–1 and having a total goal difference by +60.

The two best placed teams from each group advances to B-semifinals. The rest of the teams advances to play the corresponding team from the other group i placement matches.

=== Group C ===
Team	Pld	W	D	L	GF	GA	GD	Pts
Russia	3	3	0	0	36	4	+32	6
Singapore	3	2	0	1	8	19	−11	4
Japan	3	1	0	2	6	13	−7	2
Great Britain	3	0	0	3	2	16	−14	0

20 May 2001
09:00

Russia

10–2
(3–0, 4–1, 3–1)

Japan

Riga

20 May 2001
11:15

Singapore

4–1
(1–0, 1–1, 2–0)

Great Britain

Riga

21 May 2001
13:30

Japan

3–1
(2–0, 0–1, 1–0)

Great Britain

Riga

21 May 2001
15:45

Russia

17–2
(8–2, 4–0, 5–0)

Singapore

Riga

23 May 2001
13:00

Great Britain

0–9
(0–1, 0–4, 0–4)

Russia

Riga

23 May 2001
15:30

Singapore

2–1
(0–0, 1–0, 1–1)

Japan

Riga

=== Group D ===
Team	Pld	W	D	L	GF	GA	GD	Pts
Denmark	3	2	1	0	14	5	+9	5
Poland	3	1	2	0	8	5	+3	4
Australia	3	1	1	1	12	7	+5	3
Hungary	3	0	0	3	3	20	−17	0

20 May 2001
13:30

Australia

1–5
(0–2, 0–1, 1–2)

Denmark

Riga

20 May 2001
15:45

Poland

4–1
(2–1, 0–0, 2–0)

Hungary

Riga

21 May 2001
09:00

Denmark

7–2
(1–0, 4–1, 2–1)

Hungary

Riga

21 May 2001
11:15

Australia

2–2
(1–1, 1–1, 0–0)

Poland

Riga

23 May 2001
18:00

Hungary

0–9
(0–1, 0–3, 0–5)

Australia

Riga

23 May 2001
20:30

Poland

2–2
(1–0, 0–1, 1–1)

Denmark

Riga

=== Placement matches ===
25 May 2001
10:30

Hungary

4–1
(2–0, 1–1, 1–0)

Great Britain

25 May 2001
13:00

Russia

17–2
(7–1, 3–0, 7–1)

Poland

25 May 2001
15:30

Denmark

5–4
(2–0, 0–3, 3–1)

Singapore

25 May 2001
20:30

Japan

3–0
(1–0, 1–0, 1–0)

Australia

26 May 2001
10:00

Poland

2–4
(1–2, 0–1, 1–1)

Singapore

26 May 2001
19:00

Russia

14–1
(4–0, 6–0, 4–1)

Denmark

=== Top scorers ===
	Player	G	A	P
1	Liubov Serebryakova (RUS)	16	4	20
2	Elena Mouravieva (RUS)	11	9	20
3	Olga Serebriakova (RUS)	7	9	16
4	Olga Makarova (RUS)	5	11	16
5	Olga Skvortsova (RUS)	4	7	11
6	Elena Makarova (RUS)	4	3	7
7	Yulia Sadretdinova (RUS); Jill Quek (SIN)	6	0	6
9	Svetlana Poukhova (RUS); Tina Jensen (DEN)	4	2	6

== Final standings ==
Division A

1st place, gold medalist(s)	Finland
2nd place, silver medalist(s)	Sweden
3rd place, bronze medalist(s)	Norway
4	Switzerland
5	Czech Republic
6	Latvia
7	Germany
8	Austria

*Austria relegated to division B for 2003

Division B

1	Russia
2	Denmark
3	Singapore
4	Poland
5	Japan
6	Australia
7	Hungary
8	Great Britain

*Russia promoted to division A for 2003

== All-star team ==
The pick of Latvian Rudīte Danovska as the best goalkeeper in the tournament made her the first player outside of Sweden, Finland, Norway and Switzerland to be included in a world championship all-star team. Birgitte Lersbryggen was included in the all-star team for her second back-to-back tournament.

Goalkeeper: Rudīte Danovska (LAT)
Defender: Paula Jouhten (FIN)
Defender: Jenny Wiklund (SWE)
Centre: Birgitte Lersbryggen (NOR)
Forward: Hermine Dahlerus (SWE)
Forward: Anna Gustafsson (SWE)

MVP: Birgitte Lersbryggen (NOR)

== See also ==
- IFF Tournament Site
