= United States women's national floorball team =

- IFF Ranking: 15th (2025)

The United States women's national floorball team represents the United States in international women's floorball competitions and is governed by USA Floorball. The team competes in the Women's World Floorball Championship, organized by the International Floorball Federation (IFF).

== History ==
The United States made its early appearances in international competition in the early 2000s.

- At the 2003 World Championship in Germany, the team finished 6th in the B-Division
- At the 2005 World Championship in Singapore, the team improved to 2nd in the B-Division
- At the 2007 World Championship in Frederikshavn, Denmark, the team competed in the A-Division and placed 9th overall

Following the restructuring of the tournament format (removal of A/B divisions), the team has consistently competed in the final tournament stages.

== Recent Performance ==
In more recent years, the United States has remained a regular participant at the World Championships:

- 2017 (Slovakia): competed in final tournament
- 2019 (Switzerland): participated in championship
- 2021 (Sweden): finished 12th place
- 2025: qualified for the championship and finished around 15th place

The team's best historical result remains 9th place, achieved in multiple editions.

== Ranking & Development ==
As of 2025, the United States is ranked approximately 15th in the world by the International Floorball Federation.

The team continues to develop as floorball grows in popularity in North America, with increased youth participation and international exposure.

== Roster ==
As of 2 May 2026

#	Player	Club	Pos.	Grip	Age	Birthplace
31	Kate Macbean		G
32	Ella Gjerde		G
6	Nora Aalto		D
55	Ettalis Andersson		D
17	Ester Angerstig		D
13	Lexi Carlino		D
63	Adelia Pennisi		D
30	Tanskanen Elsa		D
11	Martha Byrket		F
41	Kimberly Campbell		F
9	Hannah Casteel		F
23	Daphny Chism		F
8	Marie Häggström		F
21	Jenny Hallström		F
57	Selma Johansson		F
10	Klara Kyrk Gere		F
16	Jennifer Köller		D
2	Suzanne Lindquist		F
52	Catherine Lovitt		F

=== Team staff ===
- Head coach – Frédéric Bernabo
- Head coach - Michaël Grandchamp
- Team Manager - Sara Alexandersson
- Team Manager – Ann Lövgren
