= Floorball at the SEA Games =

Floorball events at the SEA Games were first held at the 2015 edition in Singapore.

== History ==
Floorball was first featured in the SEA Games in the 2013 edition, hosted by Myanmar, as a demonstration sport.

The sport would debut at the 2015 edition in Singapore as a regular event. It was subsequently held in 2019, 2023 and 2025.

== Result ==
=== Men's ===
Year	Host	Gold medal match			Bronze medal match		
Year	Host	Gold	Score	Silver	Bronze	Score	Fourth place
2015; Details	Singapore	Singapore	9 – 0	Thailand	Malaysia	11 – 3	Philippines
2019; Details	(Philippines); Quezon City	Thailand	8 – 8 OT (2 – 1 SO)	Singapore	Malaysia	7 – 4	Philippines
2023; Details	(Cambodia); Phnom Penh	Thailand	3 – 2	Philippines	Singapore	3 – 1	Malaysia
2025; Details	(Thailand) Chonburi	Thailand	6 – 2	Philippines	Singapore Malaysia		

=== Women's ===
Year	Host	Gold medal match			Bronze medal match		
Year	Host	Gold	Score	Silver	Bronze	Score	Fourth place
2015; Details	Singapore	Singapore	3 – 3 (2 – 1 SO)	Thailand	Malaysia (Note: Third placer; No medal awarded)	No match	N/A
2019; Details	(Philippines); Quezon City	Singapore	3 – 2	Thailand	Malaysia	1 – 0 OT	Philippines
2023; Details	(Cambodia); Phnom Penh	Singapore	4 – 2	Thailand	Philippines	4 – 2	Malaysia
2025; Details	(Thailand) Chonburi	Thailand	2 – 1	Singapore	Philippines	3 – 2	Malaysia

== Combined medal summary ==
Rank	Nation	Gold	Silver	Bronze	Total
1	Thailand (THA)	4	4	0	8
2	Singapore (SGP)	4	2	2	8
3	Philippines (PHI)	0	2	2	4
4	Malaysia (MAS)	0	0	4	4
Totals (4 entries)		8	8	8	24

== Participating nations ==
Men

Team	(Singapore) 2015	(Philippines) 2019	(Cambodia) 2023	(Thailand) 2025	Years
Cambodia			5th		1
Indonesia		5th			1
Laos				5th	1
Malaysia	3rd	3rd	4th	4th	4
Philippines	4th	4th	2nd	2nd	4
Singapore	1st	2nd	3rd	3rd	4
Thailand	2nd	1st	1st	1st	4

Women

Team	(Singapore) 2015	(Philippines) 2019	(Cambodia) 2023	(Thailand) 2025	Years
Cambodia			5th		1
Indonesia		5th			1
Malaysia	3rd	3rd	4th	4th	4
Philippines		4th	3rd	3rd	3
Singapore	1st	1st	1st	2nd	4
Thailand	2nd	2nd	2nd	1st	4
