= Floorball at the 2025 SEA Games =

- Venue: National Sports University, Chonburi
- Dates: 13 – 19 December
- Nations: 5

Champions
- Men: Thailand
- Women: Thailand

Floorball at the 2025 SEA Games was held at the National Sports University in Chonburi, Thailand from 13 to 19 December 2025. Medals were awarded for both men and women competitions.

== Participating nations ==
Nation	Men	Women
Laos	Yes	No
Malaysia	Yes	Yes
Philippines	Yes	Yes
Singapore	Yes	Yes
Thailand	Yes	Yes
Total: 5 NOCs	5	4

== Medal summary ==
=== Medal table ===
* Host nation (Thailand)

Rank	Nation	Gold	Silver	Bronze	Total
1	Thailand (THA)	2	0	0	2
2	Philippines (PHI)	0	1	1	2
2	Singapore (SGP)	0	1	1	2
4	Malaysia (MAS)	0	0	1	1
Totals (4 entries)		2	2	3	7

=== Medalists ===
Event	Gold	Silver	Bronze
Men's tournament	Thailand	Philippines	Singapore
Men's tournament	Thailand	Philippines	Malaysia
Women's tournament	Thailand	Singapore	Philippines

== Men's tournament ==
All times are Indochina Time (UTC+7)

=== Preliminaries ===
Pos	Team	Pld	W	D	L	GF	GA	GD	Pts	Final Result
1	Thailand (H)	4	4	0	0	76	10	+66	8	Advanced to Gold medal match
2	Philippines	4	3	0	1	54	13	+41	6	Advanced to Gold medal match
3	Singapore	4	2	0	2	59	18	+41	4	
4	Malaysia	4	1	0	3	27	38	−11	2	
5	Laos	4	0	0	4	0	137	−137	0	

First match(es) will be played: 13 December 2025. Source: 2025 SEA Games
(H) Hosts

13 December; 15:00	Malaysia	3–14	Singapore	National Sports University, Chonburi

13 December; 18:00	Laos	0–45	Thailand	National Sports University, Chonburi

14 December; 12:00	Laos	0–37	Philippines	National Sports University, Chonburi

14 December; 18:00	Singapore	5–9	Thailand	National Sports University, Chonburi

15 December; 9:00	Malaysia	2–9	Philippines	National Sports University, Chonburi

15 December; 15:00	Laos	0–36	Singapore	National Sports University, Chonburi

16 December; 9:00	Singapore	4–6	Philippines	National Sports University, Chonburi

16 December; 18:00	Malaysia	3–15	Thailand	National Sports University, Chonburi

17 December; 15:00	Laos	0–19	Malaysia	National Sports University, Chonburi

17 December; 18:00	Thailand	7–2	Philippines	National Sports University, Chonburi

=== Gold medal match ===
19 December; 9:00	Thailand	6–2	Philippines	National Sports University, Chonburi

Game reference

== Women's tournament ==
All times are Indochina Time (UTC+07:00)

=== Preliminaries ===
Pos	Team	Pld	W	D	L	GF	GA	GD	Pts	Qualification
1	Singapore	3	2	1	0	19	3	+16	5	Advanced to Gold medal match
2	Thailand (H)	3	2	1	0	18	3	+15	5	Advanced to Gold medal match
3	Philippines	3	1	0	2	5	20	−15	2	Advanced to Bronze medal match
4	Malaysia	3	0	0	3	3	19	−16	0	Advanced to Bronze medal match

First match(es) will be played: 14 December 2025. Source: 2025 SEA Games
(H) Hosts

14 December; 15:00	Malaysia	0–6	Thailand	National Sports University, Chonburi

15 December; 12:00	Malaysia	2–4	Philippines	National Sports University, Chonburi

15 December; 18:00	Thailand	2–2	Singapore	National Sports University, Chonburi

16 December; 12:00	Malaysia	1–9	Singapore	National Sports University, Chonburi

16 December; 15:00	Philippines	1–10	Thailand	National Sports University, Chonburi

17 December; 12:00	Philippines	0–8	Singapore	National Sports University, Chonburi

=== Final round ===
==== Bronze medal match ====
19 December; 9:00	Philippines	3–2	Malaysia	National Sports University, Chonburi

Game reference

==== Gold medal match ====
19 December; 9:30	Thailand	2–1	Singapore	National Sports University, Chonburi

Game reference
