= Floorball at the 2015 SEA Games =

- Venue: ITE College Central
- Dates: 9–14 June 2015
- Competitors: 136 from 4 nations

Floorball at the 2015 SEA Games was held in ITE College Central, Singapore from 9 to 14 June 2015. Medals were awarded in one disciplines for both men and women competitions.

== Participating nations ==
A total of 136 athletes from four nations will be competing in floorball at the 2015 Southeast Asian Games:

- Malaysia (38)
- Philippines (18)
- Singapore (40)
- Thailand (40)

== Competition schedule ==
The following is the competition schedule for the floorball competitions:

P	Preliminaries	B	3rd place play-off	F	Final

Event↓/Date →	Tue 9	Wed 10	Thu 11	Fri 12	Sat 13	Sun 14	
Men	P	P	P	P	P	B	F
Women	P	P	P	P	P	B	F

== Medalists ==
Event	Gold	Silver	Bronze
Men's tournament	Singapore (SIN)	Thailand (THA)	Malaysia (MAS)
Women's tournament	Singapore (SIN)	Thailand (THA)	Not awarded

== Medal table ==
* Host nation (Singapore)

Rank	Nation	Gold	Silver	Bronze	Total
1	Singapore (SIN)*	2	0	0	2
2	Thailand (THA)	0	2	0	2
3	Malaysia (MAS)	0	0	1	1
Totals (3 entries)		2	2	1	5

== Final standing ==
=== Men ===
Rank	Team	Pld	W	D	L
1st place, gold medalist(s)	Singapore	4	4	0	0
2nd place, silver medalist(s)	Thailand	4	2	0	2
3rd place, bronze medalist(s)	Malaysia	4	2	0	2
4	Philippines	4	0	0	4

=== Women ===
Rank	Team	Pld	W	D	L
1st place, gold medalist(s)	Singapore	3	2	1	0
2nd place, silver medalist(s)	Thailand	3	1	1	1
3	Malaysia	2	0	0	2
