= Floorball at the 2019 SEA Games =

- Venue: UP Diliman Gymnasium
- Location: Quezon City, Metro Manila, Philippines
- Dates: 25 November – 1 December
- Competitors: 190 from 5 nations

Floorball at the 2019 SEA Games was held at the University of the Philippines College of Human Kinetics Gymnasium in Quezon City, Metro Manila, Philippines from 25 November to 1 December 2019. Medals were awarded for both men and women competitions.

== Participating nations ==
A total of 190 athletes from 5 nations were participating (the numbers of athletes are shown in parentheses).

- Indonesia (30)
- Malaysia (40)
- Philippines (40)
- Singapore (40)
- Thailand (40)

== Competition schedule ==
The following is the competition schedule for the floorball competitions:

== Medal summary ==
=== Medal table ===
* Host nation (Philippines)

Rank	Nation	Gold	Silver	Bronze	Total
1	Singapore (SGP)	1	1	0	2
1	Thailand (THA)	1	1	0	2
3	Malaysia (MAS)	0	0	2	2
Totals (3 entries)		2	2	2	6

=== Medalists ===
Event	Gold	Silver	Bronze
Men's tournament	Thailand (THA)	Singapore (SGP)	Malaysia (MAS)
Women's tournament	Singapore (SGP)	Thailand (THA)	Malaysia (MAS)

== Men's competition ==
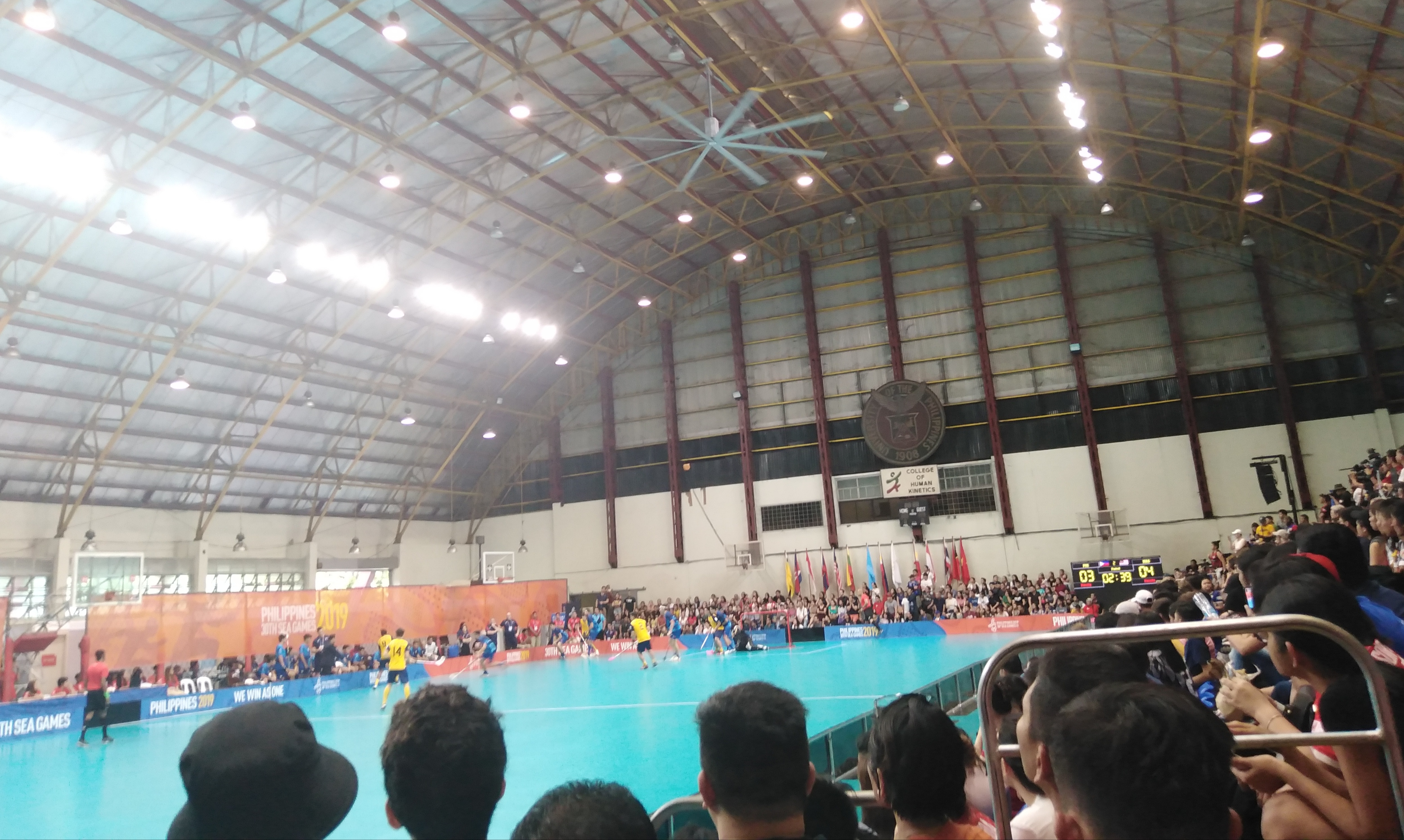
The UP CHK Gym during the bronze medal game which featured Malaysia and the Philippines.

The tournament featured 5 countries. The format was the same as 2015; there was a group of five with round-robin format. The top two of group played for the gold medal and the third and fourth place of group played for the bronze medal.

Rank	Team	Pld	W	D	L
1st place, gold medalist(s)	Thailand	5	4	1	0
2nd place, silver medalist(s)	Singapore	5	3	1	1
3rd place, bronze medalist(s)	Malaysia	5	2	0	3
4	Philippines	5	2	0	3
5	Indonesia	4	0	0	4

== Women's competition ==
The tournament featured 5 countries. The format was the same as 2015; there was a group of five with round-robin format. The top two of group played for the gold medal and the third and fourth place of group played for the bronze medal.

Rank	Team	Pld	W	D	L
1st place, gold medalist(s)	Singapore	5	5	0	0
2nd place, silver medalist(s)	Thailand	5	3	0	2
3rd place, bronze medalist(s)	Malaysia	5	2	1	2
4	Philippines	5	1	1	3
5	Indonesia	4	0	0	4
