= Asia-Oceania Floorball Cup =

Floorball tournament

- Founded: 2017 (men); 2018 (women)
- Region: Asia-Oceania
- Current champions: Singapore (men); Singapore (women)
- Website: floorball.sport/iff-events/aofc-cup

The Asia-Oceania Floorball Cup (AOFC) is a biennial floorball tournament for men and women and is organized by the Asia Oceania Floorball Confederation. It succeeds the Asia Pacific Floorball Championship.

== Results ==
=== Men ===
Year	Host city	Winners	Score	Runners-up	Third place	Score	Fourth place
2017; Details	(Thailand); Bangkok	Thailand	8–4	Singapore	South Korea	4–2	Indonesia
2019; Details	(Philippines); Biñan	Singapore	17–1	Thailand	Philippines	6–5; OT	South Korea
2023; Details	Singapore	Thailand	4–2	Singapore A	Singapore B	3–1	South Korea
2025; Details	(China); Jiangxi	Singapore	8–7	Thailand	South Korea		?

=== Women ===
Year	Host city	Winners	Score	Runners-up	Third place	Score	Fourth place
2018; Details	Singapore	Singapore	4–1	Thailand	Japan	4–3; OT	Malaysia
2022; Details	Singapore	Singapore	4-1	Philippines	Malaysia	3–2	Thailand

== Ranking ==
Rank	Nation	Gold	Silver	Bronze	Total
1	Singapore (SIN)	4	2	1	7
2	Thailand (THA)	2	3	0	5
3	Philippines (PHI)	0	1	1	2
4	South Korea (KOR)	0	0	2	2
5	Japan (JPN)	0	0	1	1
5	Malaysia (MAS)	0	0	1	1
Totals (6 entries)		6	6	6	18

== Participation ==
Men's

Team	(Thailand) 2017	(Philippines) 2019	(Singapore) 2023	(China) 2025	Years
China	6th			Q	2
Hong Kong				Q	1
India	5th	7th			2
Indonesia	4th				1
Iran	7th				1
Japan		5th			1
South Korea	3rd	4th	4th	3rd	4
Macau				6th	1
Malaysia		6th	5th		2
Malaysia B			8th		1
New Zealand			6th		1
Pakistan		8th			1
Philippines	8th	3rd	7th		3
Singapore	2nd	1st	2nd	1st	4
Singapore B			3rd		1
Thailand	1st	2nd	1st	2nd	4
Total (11)	8	8	8	6	-

Women's

Team	(Singapore) 2018	(Singapore) 2022	Years
India	6th		1
Indonesia	7th	6th	2
Iran	8th		1
Japan	3rd		1
Malaysia	4th	3rd	2
Philippines	5th	2nd	2
Singapore	1st	1st	2
Singapore U19		5th	1
Thailand	2nd	4th	2
Total (8)	8	6	-

== See also ==
- Asia Pacific Floorball Championship
- World Floorball Championships
- 2019 Women's World Floorball Championships qualification
- 2024 Men's World Floorball Championships qualification
- Under-19 World Floorball Championships
