= Asia Pacific Floorball Championship =

Asia-Oceania Floorball Cup
- Founded: 2004
- Region: Asia-Oceania
- Current champions: Singapore (men); Japan (women)
- Website: floorball.sport/iff-events/aofc-cup

Asia Pacific Floorball Championship was Floorball Championships in Asia Pacific and replaced by Asia-Oceania Floorball Cup.

== History ==
The Asia Pacific Floorball Championships are organized by the Asia Oceania Floorball Confederation. From year 2010 onwards the APAC has been the Asia and Oceania Qualification tournament for the Men´s and Women´s World Championships. The Asia Pacific Floorball Championship was succeeded by the Asia-Oceania Floorball Cup which held its first edition in 2017 Men's Asia-Oceania Floorball Cup and 2018 Women's Asia-Oceania Floorball Cup.

== Summary ==
=== Men's Asia Pacific Floorball Championships ===
No.	Year	Champions	Runners-up	Score	Location
1	2004	Japan	Singapore	3:2	Singapore
2	2005	Japan	Australia	—	Singapore
3	2006	Singapore	Australia	9:3	Singapore
4	2007	Singapore	South Korea	7:3	Singapore
5	2008	Singapore	Australia	5:3	Perth
6	2009	Japan	Australia	—	Pyeongtaek
7	2010	Singapore	Japan	—	Singapore
8	2011	Australia	Singapore	—	Perth
9	2012	Singapore	Japan	—	Hanno-shi

- Note: A "—" in the score column represents a year with no final. Those championships were decided by the leader at the end of the group stage.

=== Women's Asia Pacific Floorball Championships ===
No.	Year	Champions	Runners-up	Score	Location
1	2004	Japan	Singapore	3:2	Singapore
2	2005	Singapore	Japan	—	Singapore
3	2009	Japan	Singapore	—	Pyeongtaek
4	2011	Japan	Australia	—	

- Note: A "—" in the score column represents a year with no final. Those championships were decided by the leader at the end of the group stage.

== Medals ==
=== Men (2004–2012) ===
Rank	Nation	Gold	Silver	Bronze	Total
1	Singapore (SIN)	5	2	2	9
2	Japan (JPN)	3	2	1	6
3	Australia (AUS)	1	4	2	7
4	South Korea (KOR)	0	1	3	4
5	New Zealand (NZL)	0	0	1	1
Totals (5 entries)		9	9	9	27

=== Women (2004–2011) ===
Rank	Nation	Gold	Silver	Bronze	Total
1	Japan (JPN)	3	1	0	4
2	Singapore (SIN)	1	2	2	5
3	Australia (AUS)	0	1	1	2
4	South Korea (KOR)	0	0	1	1
Totals (4 entries)		4	4	4	12

=== Total (2004–2012) ===
Rank	Nation	Gold	Silver	Bronze	Total
1	Singapore (SIN)	6	4	4	14
2	Japan (JPN)	6	3	1	10
3	Australia (AUS)	1	5	3	9
4	South Korea (KOR)	0	1	4	5
5	New Zealand (NZL)	0	0	1	1
Totals (5 entries)		13	13	13	39

== Results ==
=== Men ===
==== 2004 ====
Round robin

Pos	Team	Pld	W	D	L	GF	GA	GD	Pts	Qualification
1	Japan	3	3	0	0	14	0	+14	6	Final
2	Singapore (H)	3	2	0	1	13	2	+11	4	Final
3	Australia	3	1	0	2	4	6	−2	2	Third place play-off
4	Malaysia	3	0	0	3	2	25	−23	0	Third place play-off

Source: IFF
(H) Hosts

8 December 2004	Malaysia	0–10	Japan	Woodlands Sports Hall, Singapore

Game reference

9 December 2004	Singapore	2–0	Australia	Woodlands Sports Hall, Singapore

Game reference

9 December 2004	Australia	0–4	Japan	Woodlands Sports Hall, Singapore

Game reference

9 December 2004	Singapore	11–2	Malaysia	Woodlands Sports Hall, Singapore

Game reference

10 December 2004	Australia	4–0	Malaysia	Woodlands Sports Hall, Singapore

Game reference

10 December 2004	Japan	4–0	Singapore	Woodlands Sports Hall, Singapore

Game reference

Bronze medal match

11 December 2004	Australia	4–2	Malaysia	Woodlands Sports Hall, Singapore

Game reference

Final

11 December 2004	Singapore	2–3	Japan	Woodlands Sports Hall, Singapore

Game reference

==== 2005 ====
Pos	Team	Pld	W	D	L	GF	GA	GD	Pts	Medal
1	Japan	4	3	1	0	62	8	+54	7	Gold medal
2	Australia	4	3	0	1	53	15	+38	6	Silver medal
3	Singapore (H)	4	2	1	1	59	8	+51	5	Bronze medal
4	South Korea	4	1	0	3	26	39	−13	2	
5	India	4	0	0	4	5	135	−130	0	

Source: IFF
(H) Hosts

1 December 2005	Japan	10–3	Australia	Singapore

Game reference

1 December 2005	Singapore	41–2	India	Singapore

Game reference

1 December 2005	Japan	17–3	South Korea	Singapore

Game reference

2 December 2005	India	1–39	Australia	Singapore

Game reference

2 December 2005	South Korea	0–13	Singapore	Singapore

Game reference

3 December 2005	India	2–22	South Korea	Singapore

Game reference

3 December 2005	Singapore	3–4	Australia	Singapore

Game reference

3 December 2005	Japan	33–0	India	Singapore

Game reference

4 December 2005	Australia	7–1	South Korea	Singapore

Game reference

4 December 2005	Japan	2–2	Singapore	Singapore

Game reference

==== 2006 ====
Final Standings Men´s APAC 2006:

1. Singapore A

2. Australia

3. Singapore B

4. Malaysia

Results:

09.12.2006: Malaysia-Australia 3-10 (M)

09.12.2006: Singapore A-Singapore B 6-2 (M)

09.12.2006: Singapore B-Malaysia 2-5 (M)

10.12.2006: Malaysia-Singapore A 3-14 (M)

10.12.2006: Australia-Singapore B 7-5 (M)

10.12.2006: Singapore A-Australia 3-0 (M)

11.12.2006: Singapore A-Singapore B 9-1 (M)

11.12.2006: Malaysia-Australia 2-4 (M)

11.12.2006: Singapore B-Malaysia 4-3 (M)

12.12.2006: Australia-Singapore B 7-7 (M)

12.12.2006: Malaysia-Singapore A 2-11 (M)

12.12.2006: Singapore A-Australia 9-3 (M)

==== 2007 ====
Final Standings Men´s APAC 2007:

1. Singapore A

2. Korea

3. Japan B

4. Singapore B

5. Japan A

6. Australia A

7. Australia B

8. Malaysia

Results:

05.12.2007: Korea-Japan A 6-5 (M)

05.12.2007: Australia A-Japan B 7-8 (M)

05.12.2007: Singapore B-Malaysia 8-2 (M)

05.12.2007: Australia B-Singapore A 3-10 (M)

06.12.2007: Malaysia-Japan B 3-6 (M)

06.12.2007: Japan A-Australia B 3-1 (M)

06.12.2007: Singapore A-Korea 7-4 (M)

06.12.2007: Singapore B-Australia A 5-7 (M)

07.12.2007: Korea-Australia B 3-2 (M)

07.12.2007: Australia A-Malaysia 5-7 (M)

07.12.2007: Japan B-Singapore B 6-5 (M)

07.12.2007: Singapore A-Japan A 4-3 (M)

08.12.2007: Australia B-Malaysia 6-3 7th place (M)

08.12.2007: Australia A-Japan A 2-12 5th place (M)

08.12.2007: Singapore A-Singapore B 10-1 Semi 1 (M)

08.12.2007: Japan B-Korea 1-2 Semi 2 (M)

09.12.2007: Singapore B-Japan B 4-10 3rd place (M)

09.12.2007: Singapore A-Korea 7-3 Final (M)

==== 2008 ====
FINAL STANDINGS

1. Singapore Men

2. Australia Men

3. Korea Men

4. Australia Men U19

5. Malaysia Men

Group Match Results

25.08. 14:04 Group A: MAS M - AUS M 4-13

25.08. 17:08 Group A: SGP M - KOR M 5-2

25.08. 20:00 Group A: AUS MU19 - MAS M 15-2

26.08. 10:00 Group A: AUS M - SGP M 2-4

26.08. 13:00 Group A: KOR M - AUS MU19 3-4

26.08. 16:03 Group A: MAS M - SGP M 2-16

26.08. 19:00 Group A: KOR M - AUS M 5-6

27.08. 10:09 Group A: AUS MU19 - SGP M 2-5

27.08. 12:44 Group A: KOR M - MAS M 5-1

27.08. 19:00 Group A: AUS M - AUS MU19 8-1

Play-off Match Results

28.08. 12:00 Semi-final 1: SGP M - KOR M 4-2

28.08. 15:00 Semi-final 2: AUS M - AUS MU19 2-1

29.08. 10:37 Bronze game: AUS MU19 - KOR M 2-3 ot.

29.08. 13:33 Final: SGP M - AUS M 5-3

==== 2009 ====
Final Standings Men´s APAC 2009

1. Japan

2. Australia

3. Korea

4. Malaysia

5. Singapore

6. India

Standings

Team M W T L GF-GA PTS

1. JPN M 5 5 0 0 116-7 10

2. AUS M 5 4 0 1 86-15 8

3. KOR M 5 3 0 2 57-19 6

4. MAS M 5 2 0 3 38-38 4

5. SGP M 5 1 0 4 39-59 2

6. IND M 5 0 0 5 1-199 0

25.03. 10:00 Group A: SGP M - IND M 31-0

25.03. 13:00 Group A: KOR M - AUS M 2-6

25.03. 19:00 Group A: JPN M - MAS M 14-1

26.03. 11:30 Group A: IND M - JPN M 0-59

26.03. 14:00 Group A: MAS M - KOR M 2-11

26.03. 19:00 Group A: AUS M - SGP M 18-1

27.03. 11:30 Group A: JPN M - SGP M 26-0

27.03. 14:00 Group A: MAS M - AUS M 3-8

27.03. 19:00 Group A: KOR M - IND M 34-1

28.03. 15:00 Group A: IND M - AUS M 0-50

28.03. 15:00 Group A: KOR M - JPN M 2-8

28.03. 17:30 Group A: SGP M - MAS M 5-7

29.03. 10:00 Group A: MAS M - IND M 25-0

29.03. 12:30 Group A: AUS M - JPN M 4-9

29.03. 15:00 Group A: SGP M - KOR M 2-8

==== 2010 ====
Team	MP	W	D	L	GF	GA	GD	PTS
Singapore	4	3	1	0	45	9	+36	7
Japan	4	3	1	0	25	9	+16	7
Australia	4	1	1	2	19	17	+2	3
South Korea	4	1	1	2	19	21	-2	3
Malaysia	4	0	0	4	4	56	-52	0

03.02. 16:00 Group E: JPN M - AUS M 6-2

03.02. 19:00 Group E: KOR M - SIN M 2-10

04.02. 16:00 Group E: SIN M - MAS M 25-1

04.02. 19:00 Group E: KOR M - AUS M 3-3

05.02. 16:00 Group E: MAS M - JPN M 1-11

05.02. 19:00 Group E: AUS M - SIN M 4-8

06.02. 15:00 Group E: MAS M - KOR M 2-10

06.02. 18:00 Group E: SIN M - JPN M 2-2

07.02. 13:00 Group E: JPN M - KOR M 6-4

07.02. 16:00 Group E: AUS M - MAS M 10-0

==== 2011 ====
Men´s APAC 2011

1.Australia MU19

2. Singapore MU19

3.New Zealand

Australia Men U19 won the Men´s APAC 2011.

28.01. 08:00 Int´l match: AUS MU19 - NZL M 6-3

28.01. 14:30 Int´l match: SGP MU19 - NZL M 5-2

28.01. 19:30 Int´l match: SGP MU19 - AUS MU19 2-3

29.01. 08:01 Int´l match: NZL M - AUS MU19 2-3

29.01. 15:01 Int´l match: NZL M - SGP MU19 1-8

30.01. 12:28 Int´l match: AUS MU19 - SGP MU19 4-2

==== 2012 ====
APAC Standings

Team M W T L GF-GA PTS

1. SGP M 4 3 0 1 30-11 6

2. JPN M 4 3 0 1 28-9 6

3. KOR M 4 2 0 2 29-11 4

4. AUS M 4 2 0 2 20-15 4

5. IRI M 4 0 0 4 2-63 0

08.02. 09:00 AOFC: KOR M - JPN M 3-4

08.02. 12:02 AOFC: AUS M - SGP M 5-4

08.02. 15:00 AOFC: JPN M - IRI M 16-0

09.02. 12:00 AOFC: SGP M - IRI M 17-1

09.02. 14:57 AOFC: KOR M - AUS M 5-0

10.02. 09:00 AOFC: IRI M - AUS M 0-12

10.02. 12:00 AOFC: JPN M - SGP M 2-3

10.02. 15:00 AOFC: IRI M - KOR M 1-18

11.02. 10:00 AOFC: SGP M - KOR M 6-3

11.02. 13:00 AOFC: JPN M - AUS M 6-3

=== Women ===
==== 2004 ====
Final Standings Women´s APAC 2004:

1. Japan A

2. Singapore Orchids

3. Singapore Bougainvillea

4. Malaysia

Results Women:

08.12.2004: Singapore Bouganvillea-Singapore Orchids 0-7 (W)

08.12.2004: Malaysia-Japan 0-12 (W)

09.12.2004: Japan-Singapore Bouganvillea 9-1 (W)

09.12.2004: Singapore Orchids-Malaysia 7-1 (W)

10.12.2004: Singapore Bouganvillea-Malaysia 3-5 (W)

10.12.2004: Japan-Singapore Orchids 2-3 (W)

11.12.2004: Singapore Bouganvillea-Malaysia 3-1 3rd place (W)

11.12.2004: Singapore Orchids-Japan 2-3 Final (W)

==== 2005 ====
Final Standings Women´s APAC 2005:

1. Singapore

2. Japan

3. Australia

Results Women:

01.12.2005: Australia-Japan 4-6 (W)

02.12.2005: Japan-Australia 5-5 (W)

02.12.2005: Australia-Singapore 4-4 (W)

03.12.2005: Singapore-Japan 3-1 (W) (Also WFC 2007 Qualification)

04.12.2005: Singapore-Australia 2-1 (W)

04.12.2005: Japan-Singapore 5-4 (W)

==== 2009 ====
Final Standings Women´s APAC 2009

1.Japan

2.Singapore

3.Korea

25.03. 16:30 Group A: JPN W - KOR W 13-0

26.03. 09:00 Group A: SGP W - JPN W 1-6

26.03. 16:30 Group A: KOR W - SGP W 1-16

27.03. 09:00 Group A: KOR W - JPN W 2-16

27.03. 16:30 Group A: JPN W - SGP W 4-2

28.03. 10:00 Group A: SGP W - KOR W 16-0

Standings

Team M W T L GF-GA PTS

1. JPN W 4 4 0 0 39-5 8

2. SGP W 4 2 0 2 35-11 4

3. KOR W 4 0 0 4 3-61 0

==== 2011 ====
Women´s APAC 2011

1.Japan

2.Australia

3. Singapore

Women´s Development trophy

1. Australia

2. Australia Dev

3. Singapore WU19

Match Schedule

28.01. 10:16 Int´l match: AUS W - SGP W 4-0

28.01. 12:33 Int´l match: SGP WU19 - Australia W Dev 3-7

28.01. 16:36 Int´l match: JPN W - AUS W 6-3

29.01. 10:08 Int´l match: AUS W - SGP WU19 13-0

29.01. 12:10 AOFC: SGP W - JPN W 5-3

29.01. 17:00 Int´l match: Australia W Dev - SGP WU19 6-2

30.01. 09:37 AOFC: JPN W - SGP W 9-4

30.01. 14:56 Int´l match: Australia W Dev - AUS W 0-3

Matches counted for Women´s APAC 2011 trophy:

28.1. Australia W - Singapore W 4-0

28.1. Japan W - Australia W 6-3

29.1. Japan W - Singapore W 3-5

Japan won Women´s APAC 2011 with more goals scored compared to Australia (Japan 9-8, Australia 7-6).

Women´s Standings

Team M W T L GF-GA PTS

1. AUS W 4 3 0 1 23-6 6

2. JPN W 3 2 0 1 18-12 4

3. Australia W Dev 3 2 0 1 13-8 4

4. SGP W 3 1 0 2 9-16 2

5. SGP WU19 3 0 0 3 5-26 0

== See also ==
- Asia-Oceania Floorball Cup
- Southeast Asian Floorball Championships
- Asia Pacific Lacrosse Championship
- World Floorball Championships
- Asian Netball Championship
- Asia-Oceania Korfball Championship
- Asia-Pacific Fistball Championships
