= Floorball at the 2023 SEA Games =

- Venue: Dinasaur Park Hall, Chroy Changvar Convention Centre
- Dates: 11 May – 16 May
- Nations: 5

Floorball at the 2023 SEA Games was held at the Dinasaur Park Hall, Chroy Changvar Convention Centre in Phnom Penh, Cambodia from 11 May to 16 May 2023.

== Participating nations ==
- Cambodia
- Malaysia
- Philippines
- Singapore
- Thailand

== Medal summary ==
=== Medal table ===
* Host nation (Cambodia)

| Rank | Nation | Gold | Silver | Bronze | Total |
|---|---|---|---|---|---|
| 1 | Thailand (THA) | 1 | 1 | 0 | 2 |
| 2 | Singapore (SGP) | 1 | 0 | 1 | 2 |
| 3 | Philippines (PHI) | 0 | 1 | 1 | 2 |
| 4 | Malaysia (MAS) | 0 | 0 | 2 | 2 |
| Totals (4 entries) | | 2 | 2 | 4 | 8 |

=== Medalists ===
| Event | Gold | Silver | Bronze |
|---|---|---|---|
| Men's tournament | Thailand; Anawin Sarnok; Tnakit Kayairit; Simon Johansson; Sikharin Inpa; Alexander Rinefalk; Surapong Sangmongkhol; Santipong Sukkasem; Watcharapon Onsuk; Pawat Thaidit; Prakasit Namsawang; Kevin Hoeglenius; Jeerayut Yaemyim; Chusak Narkprasert; Veerasak Pimpa; Pheeraphong Khambanlue; Liam Kerdsawangwong; Yotsaphong Chaiphring; Aphichet Ratanaprathum; Anucha Wong-art; Theerawat Noisai | Philippines; Ludvig Hemmingberg; Henielee Pastor; Patrik Schoultze Castrillo; Lucas Werelius; Luis Manila; Simon Sicat-Laraño; Lucas Öijvall Perez; Christian Schoultze Castrillo; Claude Vitaliano; Fredrik Jeppsson; Christofer Holland Bernardo; Melvin Alm Mendoza; Fredrik Dahmen Cantos; Michael Hedblom; Kim Varga Franz; John Alicante Embile; Mattiece Myllyperkiö; Jay-R Beterbo; Victor Lindberg; Bryant Arocena | Singapore; Damien Wan Junwei; Haleef Hairon; Lee Chee Yong; Nicholas Chua Wee Guan; Nicholas Low; Foo Jun Wei; Sean Huang; R Suria; Muhammad Haziq Abdul Wahab; Koh Ye Shen; Yeung Chun Yin; R Sathish; Vignesa Pasupathy; Kumaresa Pasupathy; Mohamad Haris Abdul; Keanen Poon; Lim Jian Hong; Thaddeus Tze Wen Tan; Jared Hong Jie Tan; Cheang Jia Qing |
| Men's tournament | Thailand; Anawin Sarnok; Tnakit Kayairit; Simon Johansson; Sikharin Inpa; Alexander Rinefalk; Surapong Sangmongkhol; Santipong Sukkasem; Watcharapon Onsuk; Pawat Thaidit; Prakasit Namsawang; Kevin Hoeglenius; Jeerayut Yaemyim; Chusak Narkprasert; Veerasak Pimpa; Pheeraphong Khambanlue; Liam Kerdsawangwong; Yotsaphong Chaiphring; Aphichet Ratanaprathum; Anucha Wong-art; Theerawat Noisai | Philippines; Ludvig Hemmingberg; Henielee Pastor; Patrik Schoultze Castrillo; Lucas Werelius; Luis Manila; Simon Sicat-Laraño; Lucas Öijvall Perez; Christian Schoultze Castrillo; Claude Vitaliano; Fredrik Jeppsson; Christofer Holland Bernardo; Melvin Alm Mendoza; Fredrik Dahmen Cantos; Michael Hedblom; Kim Varga Franz; John Alicante Embile; Mattiece Myllyperkiö; Jay-R Beterbo; Victor Lindberg; Bryant Arocena | Malaysia; Yeoh Chun Keat; Nehemiah Tharmaraj; Lim Wei Shen; Lim Kai Sheng; Lai Yi Qin; Mohamad Shukri Shamidi; Satish Prakasham; Chin Wen Jian; Tristan James; Divesh Mohan; Chong En Wei; Sureynjen Manogaran; Chow Hoong Fee; Choo Zhi Yung; Toh Ji Min; Lim Wen Jun; Chong Han Keong; Lee Ren Tze; Teh Chin Hong; Chin Tian Jun |
| Women's tournament | Singapore; Yeo Xuan; Tan Hui Zhi; Mindy Lim; Siti Nurhaliza Khairul Anuar; Lim Jie Ying; Yee Yun Shawn; Daphne Tan; Nasha Jeffri; Ong Jia Min; Amanda Yeap; Adlyn Heng; Fasya M. Yusni; Foo Wen Xin; Hoo Mei Hui; Ong Swee Ling; Shannon Yeo; Shermaine Goh; Michelle Lok; Shazana Noor | Thailand; Geeranan Raengrob; Jarupa Sae Her; Nelly Johansson; Aliisa Syrjaenen; Pannee Moolsan; Kotchakorn Banyenngam; Paiya Kittinanthawat; Nur-air A-bu; Praphaphon Bunsuk; Rungnapa Kebsamrong; Suthasinee Phalaruk; Khwanchanok Suksin; Kamonchanok Woraanu; Chomphonake Srisawad; Sasikarn Phuphet; Sirinan Boonbut; Pichavee Yoolai; Wilma Brande; Durnchai Sornngam; Tinna Siljamäki | Philippines; Keziah Espidillon; Angelica Bengtsson; Pauline Tolentino; Heidi Hyryläinen; Dianne Villegas; Ronalynn Ranta; Jerymae Berdan; Annicah Cahatian; Jerylou Berdan; Edelyn Grace Embile; Pia Tolentino; Nathalie Sundin; Imma Cruzado; Loella Andersson; Michelle Anne Cruzado; Sara Hemmingberg; Marika Lehvilä; Hanna Esteves Englund; Jade Ariadne Rivera; Roxane Ruiz |
| Women's tournament | Singapore; Yeo Xuan; Tan Hui Zhi; Mindy Lim; Siti Nurhaliza Khairul Anuar; Lim Jie Ying; Yee Yun Shawn; Daphne Tan; Nasha Jeffri; Ong Jia Min; Amanda Yeap; Adlyn Heng; Fasya M. Yusni; Foo Wen Xin; Hoo Mei Hui; Ong Swee Ling; Shannon Yeo; Shermaine Goh; Michelle Lok; Shazana Noor | Thailand; Geeranan Raengrob; Jarupa Sae Her; Nelly Johansson; Aliisa Syrjaenen; Pannee Moolsan; Kotchakorn Banyenngam; Paiya Kittinanthawat; Nur-air A-bu; Praphaphon Bunsuk; Rungnapa Kebsamrong; Suthasinee Phalaruk; Khwanchanok Suksin; Kamonchanok Woraanu; Chomphonake Srisawad; Sasikarn Phuphet; Sirinan Boonbut; Pichavee Yoolai; Wilma Brande; Durnchai Sornngam; Tinna Siljamäki | Malaysia; Ang Ling Ling; Nur Dianah Athirah Zulkefley; Naomi Mair Selvanayagam; Cheah Pei Yi; Kuek Ji Mun; Nur Suraya Ashikin Mohamad Zuraimi; Michaela Khoo Lee Ann; Fathih Hasni Che Husain; Sarannia Veeramuthu; Goh Yen Yen; Chriyenterl Chao Shen Marcus; Aina Syafiqah Mohd Amin; Teja Ellesa Mohzeiswandi; Asvitha Nadesan; Nur Shafinaz Mohamed Rafiq; Nur Anis Amyzaa Zakaria; Nurfarah Syahira Md Yusof; Ellya Syahirah Ellias; Nur Syafiqah Mohd Zain; Shanggamithara Parameswaran |

== Competition ==
=== Men's tournament ===
| Rank | Team | Pld | W | D | L |
|---|---|---|---|---|---|
| 1st place, gold medalist(s) | Thailand | 5 | 4 | 0 | 1 |
| 2nd place, silver medalist(s) | Philippines | 5 | 4 | 0 | 1 |
| 3rd place, bronze medalist(s) | Singapore | 5 | 3 | 0 | 2 |
| 4 | Malaysia | 5 | 1 | 0 | 4 |
| 5 | Cambodia | 4 | 0 | 0 | 4 |

=== Women's tournament ===
| Rank | Team | Pld | W | D | L |
|---|---|---|---|---|---|
| 1st place, gold medalist(s) | Singapore | 5 | 4 | 0 | 2 |
| 2nd place, silver medalist(s) | Thailand | 5 | 4 | 0 | 2 |
| 3rd place, bronze medalist(s) | Philippines | 5 | 2 | 1 | 2 |
| 4 | Malaysia | 5 | 1 | 1 | 3 |
| 5 | Cambodia | 4 | 0 | 0 | 4 |
