= Jill Quek =

Singaporean floorball player

Personal information
- Nationality: Singapore
- Born: 30 August 1978 (age 47)

Sport
- Sport: Floorball
- Position: Forward
- Shoots: Right
Medal record
Representing Singapore
Southeast Asian Games
Gold medal – first place	2015 Singapore	Team
Southeast Asian Championships
Gold medal – first place	2014 Singapore	Team

Jill Quek (born 30 August 1978) is a Singaporean former floorball player who played as a forward for the Singapore women's national team and is now a floorball coach. She is the first Asian to be inducted to the International Floorball Federation's Hall of Fame.

== Career ==
Originally in-line and ice hockey player, Quek transitioned to floorball. Quek joined Swedish club Örebro in 2000, to become the first Singaporean to play in the Scandinavian country. The year later, she and her younger sister Martha joined Hässelby. She also played in Finland.

Quek was a long-time player for the Singapore women's national team. She had 64 international appearances for Singapore and was part of the Singapore squad for seven World Floorball Championships prior to her retirement in 2017. She considered retiring in 2009, but went on to play floorball for several years. Her only appearance in the Southeast Asian Games was in 2015 edition in Singapore when floorball was contested.

By 2011, Quek was already serving as a full-time coach for Singaporean floorball players.

On 5 December 2021, Quek was inducted to the International Floorball Federation's Hall of Fame. She was the first Asian inductee.
