= 2022 Women's Asia-Oceania Floorball Cup =

Tournament details
- Host country: Singapore
- Venue(s): 1 (in 1 host city)
- Dates: 23 – 28 May 2022
- Teams: 6

Final positions
- Champions: Singapore (2nd title)
- Runner-up: Philippines
- Third place: Malaysia

Tournament statistics
- Matches played: 18
- Goals scored: 122 (6.78 per match)

The 2022 Women's Asia-Oceania Floorball Cup was a continental floorball tournament held in Singapore from 23 to 28 May 2022. Matches was held at the OCBC Arena.

== Preliminary round ==
Advance to Final
Advance to Third place match
Advance to Classification 5th–6th

Team	Pld	W	D	L	GF	GA	GD	Pts
Philippines	5	5	0	0	33	7	+26	10
Singapore	5	4	0	1	30	6	+24	8
Thailand	5	4	0	1	21	16	+5	8
Malaysia	5	1	0	4	13	20	−7	2
Singapore U19	5	1	0	4	5	14	−9	2
Indonesia	5	0	0	5	3	42	−39	0

Source: IFF

23 May 2022	Philippines	9 – 0	Indonesia	OCBC Arena, Kallang

Game reference

23 May 2022	Malaysia	2 – 3	Thailand	OCBC Arena, Kallang

Game reference

23 May 2022	Singapore U19	0 – 4	Singapore	OCBC Arena, Kallang

Game reference

24 May 2022	Philippines	9 – 2	Malaysia	OCBC Arena, Kallang

Game reference

24 May 2022	Singapore U19	1 – 2	Thailand	OCBC Arena, Kallang

Game reference

24 May 2022	Indonesia	0 – 13	Singapore	OCBC Arena, Kallang

Game reference

25 May 2022	Indonesia	2 – 6	Malaysia	OCBC Arena, Kallang

Game reference

25 May 2022	Singapore U19	1 – 4	Philippines	OCBC Arena, Kallang

Game reference

25 May 2022	Singapore	6 – 2	Thailand	OCBC Arena, Kallang

Game reference

26 May 2022	Thailand	2 – 8	Philippines	OCBC Arena, Kallang

Game reference

26 May 2022	Indonesia	1 – 3	Singapore U19	OCBC Arena, Kallang

Game reference

26 May 2022	Malaysia	1 – 5	Singapore	OCBC Arena, Kallang

Game reference

27 May 2022	Thailand	11 – 0	Indonesia	OCBC Arena, Kallang

Game reference

27 May 2022	Malaysia	3 – 0	Singapore U19	OCBC Arena, Kallang

Game reference

27 May 2022	Singapore	2 – 3	Philippines	OCBC Arena, Kallang

Game reference

== Final round ==
=== Fifth place playoff ===
28 May 2022; 13:04	Singapore U19	6 – 1	Indonesia	OCBC Arena, Kallang; Attendance: 180

Game reference

=== Bronze medal match ===
12 July 2019; 15:46	Malaysia	3 – 2	Thailand	OCBC Arena, Kallang; Attendance: 201

Game reference

=== Final ===
28 May 2022; 18:33	Philippines	1 – 4	Singapore	OCBC Arena, Kallang; Attendance: 800

Game reference

== Final standing ==
The official IFF final ranking of the tournament:

Gold medal	Singapore
Silver medal	Philippines
Bronze medal	Malaysia
4	Thailand
5	Singapore U19
6	Indonesia
