= Floorball at the 2015 SEA Games – Men's tournament =

Floorball – Men's tournament at the 2015 SEA Games
- Venue: ITE (Central)
- Dates: 11–14 June
- Competitors: 78 from 4 nations

Medalists
gold medal	Singapore (SIN)
silver medal	Thailand (THA)
bronze medal	Malaysia (MAS)

The men's floorball tournament at the 2015 SEA Games was held at the ITE (Central), Singapore from 11 to 14 June 2015. The competition is held in a round-robin format, after which the top 2 teams at the end of the competition will head to play in the gold medal match while the other 2 teams play in the bronze medal match.

== Squads ==
Source: Number of Athletes - Men

Malaysia (MAS)	Philippines (PHI)	Singapore (SIN)	Thailand (THA)
Kao Lin Ken; Adrian Koay Hun Yi; Indy Benjamin Toh Ji Min; Zephaniah Chong En Wei; Joerel Jarrow Marcus Jr; Sasitheran Gopalan; Tristan Desmond Dass; Chiam Ter Min (C); Gary Lee Kah Yoon; Ravi Kumar Vijaya Kumar; Khor Kuan Yang; Lim Kai Sheng; Yeoh Jun Wooi; Khalid Abdul Rahim; Chong Chao Sheng; Sjaiful Anuar Adzhar; Low Kien Teck; Taqiuddin Izzat Md Zin; Rizal Razman; Azmill Ahmad Hadzim	Jeremiah Beltran; Ralph Ramos; Michael Villanueva; Mark Cerdon; Luis Manila III (C); Hazzer Talingdan; Mark Polo; Jose Maria Peteza Jr; Joshua Paunil; Ian Galman; Ronald Carbonell; Massada Cabillas; Joseph Navarro; Jan Claude Vitaliano; Justin Santiago; Lionel Velez; James De Jesus; Henielee Pastor	Akmal Shaharudin (C); Siraaj Ramadhan; Hamka Irfan Mohd Shah; Wong Zi Quan Gary; Amshar Amin; Jenmark Sorreda; Mazran Sutiman; Alvin Tan; Rashid Jalaluddin; Jay Pal Singh Sidhu; Phua Zhi Ming Glendon; R. Suria; Syazni Ramlee; Mckenrick Lim; Yeo Kaixiang; Abdul Hafiz Zubir; Vignesa Pasupathy; Kumaresa Pasupathy; Lim Jian Hong; Cheong Zhi Xian Brandon	Autthachai Sohtree; Aphichet Ratanaprathum; Pornphon Phuttharakkhit; Veerasak Pimpa; Teerawat Pongchawee; Pisit Samanmit; Pitsanu Kannala; Gorawee Srikaew; Sattaya Phoosinoi; Watcharapon Onsuk (C); Alexander Rinefalk; Norrawich Intani; Narawidch Songngam; Surapong Sangmongkhol; Trasama Promyart; Tanakit Juntakian; Thanakrit Boon-Art; Chonnakan Kruarod; Wiros Yosiri; Monthon Prakotchue

== Results ==
All times are Singapore Standard Time (UTC+08:00)

Source: Results Summary

=== Preliminaries ===
Source: Tournament Summary

Pos	Team	Pld	W	D	L	GF	GA	GD	Pts	Final Result
1	Singapore (H)	3	3	0	0	27	6	+21	6	Advanced to Gold medal match
2	Thailand	3	2	0	1	19	8	+11	4	Advanced to Gold medal match
3	Malaysia	3	1	0	2	14	12	+2	2	Advanced to Bronze medal match
4	Philippines	3	0	0	3	4	38	−34	0	Advanced to Bronze medal match

Source: SEA Games 2015
(H) Hosts

11 June; 13:00	Thailand	6 – 2 (0–0, 3–0, 3–2)	Malaysia	ITE (Central), Singapore

Game reference

11 June; 19:00	Philippines	2 – 17 (1–5, 1–5, 0–7)	Singapore	ITE (Central), Singapore

Game reference

12 June; 13:00	Malaysia	10 – 0 (3–0, 5–0, 2–0)	Philippines	ITE (Central), Singapore

Game reference

12 June; 16:00	Singapore	4 – 2 (2–0, 2–1, 0–1)	Thailand	ITE (Central), Singapore

Game reference

13 June; 13:00	Thailand	11 – 2 (2–0, 5–1, 4–1)	Philippines	ITE (Central), Singapore

Game reference

13 June; 19:00	Malaysia	2 – 6 (1–1, 0–2, 1–3)	Singapore	ITE (Central), Singapore

Game reference

=== Final round ===
==== Bronze medal match ====
14 June; 12:00	Malaysia	11 – 3 (2–1, 5–1, 4–1)	Philippines	ITE (Central), Singapore

Game reference
Jan Claude Vitaliano / Goals

==== Gold medal match ====
14 June; 18:00	Singapore	9 – 0 (1–0, 3–0, 5–0)	Thailand	ITE (Central), Singapore

Game reference

== See also ==
- Women's tournament
