= Floorball at the 2015 SEA Games – Women's tournament =

Floorball – Women's tournament at the 2015 SEA Games
- Venue: ITE (Central)
- Dates: 11–14 June 2015
- Competitors: 58 from 3 nations

Medalists
gold medal	Singapore (SIN)
silver medal	Thailand (THA)

The women's floorball tournament at the 2015 SEA Games was held at the ITE (Central), Singapore from 11 to 14 June 2015. The competition was held in a round-robin format, after which the top 2 teams at the end of the competition played in the gold medal match.

== Squads ==
Malaysia (MAS)	Singapore (SIN)	Thailand (THA)
Michaela Khoo Lee Ann; Giam Hui Ni; Eeleen Tan; Lee Shan Ling; Wendy Wong Kwan Lai; Ang Ling Ling; Ivana Sonia Anak Beriak; Fathih Hasni Che Husain; Goh Yen Yen; Naomi Mair Selvanayagam; Nurhasheda Md Noh; Cheah Pei Yi; Norhafizah Razali; Nur Aainaa Puteh Hussin; Kong Qiu Ginj; Nor Eeza Zainal Abidin; Jadeera Cheong Phaik Geok (C); Siti Alina Suhaimi	Yeo Xuan; Evangeline Poon; Jill Quek; Lim Jia Mei, Vanessa; Joscelin Kee Tingyi; Felicia Lim Pei Ting; Jowie Tan Hui Ying; Wynne Tang (C); Natalia Clare Wee Yuning; Ou Mei Wen; Khoo Min Zhi Denise; Amanda Yeap; Suhaidah Mohd Yusof; Tan Jean Lynn Laura; Debbie Poh; Ong Hui Hui; Sharifah Syed Abdullah; Lai Soak Kuan; Gracia Sengutuvan; Fariza Begum Mohamed Zabir	Supasuta Thiptha; Nattida Chanted; Sunisa Utta; Pichavee Yoolai; Mutmee Maneepura; Aunchleeporn Hinmalai; Thanaporn Tongkham; Sunaree Thoengkhunthod; Khwanchanok Suksin; Nattawan Ounmuangthong; Nina Marianne Suppa (C); Ornpanee Watcharoen; Pornsuree Toemsombatbowon; Onuma Doungsuda; Vilaiporn Jornburom; Nasha Jutawijittam; Wibunsiri Phetpraphai; Thararat Duangporn; Somlak Suttiprapa; Somsawan Bungnasaeng

== Results ==
All times are Singapore Standard Time (UTC+08:00)

Source: Results Summary

=== Preliminaries ===
Source: Tournament Summary

Pos	Team	Pld	W	D	L	GF	GA	GD	Pts	Final Result
1	Singapore (H)	2	2	0	0	7	1	+6	4	Advanced to Gold medal match
2	Thailand	2	1	0	1	7	4	+3	2	Advanced to Gold medal match
3	Malaysia	2	0	0	2	2	11	−9	0	

Source: SEA Games 2015
(H) Hosts

11 June 2015; 16:00	Malaysia	0 – 5 (0–1, 0–1, 0–3)	Singapore	ITE (Central), Singapore

Game reference

12 June 2015; 19:00	Singapore	2 – 1 (0–0, 2–1, 0–0)	Thailand	ITE (Central), Singapore

Game reference

13 June 2015; 16:00	Thailand	6 – 2 (0–0, 3–1, 3–1)	Malaysia	ITE (Central), Singapore

Game reference

=== Gold medal match ===
14 June
15:00

Singapore	3 – 3	Thailand
Yeo X. 15'; Ong H. H. 22'; D. Poh 30'	Report	S. Thoengkhunthod 12'; T. Tongkham 30'; T. Duangporn 58'
Penalties
Jill Quek (penalty shoot-out scored); Ou Wei Men (penalty shoot-out missed); Debbie Poh (penalty shoot-out missed); Natalia Clare Wee Yuning (penalty shoot-out scored); Ong Hui Hui (penalty shoot-out missed)	2–1	(penalty shoot-out scored) Sunaree Thoengkhunthod; (penalty shoot-out missed) Thanaporn Tongkham; (penalty shoot-out missed) Onuma Doungsuda; (penalty shoot-out missed) Nina Marianne Suppa; (penalty shoot-out missed) Thararat Duangporn

ITE (Central), Singapore

== Final standing ==
Rank	Team	Pld	W	D	L
1st place, gold medalist(s)	Singapore	3	2	1	0
2nd place, silver medalist(s)	Thailand	3	1	1	1
3	Malaysia	2	0	0	2

== See also ==
- Men's tournament
