= Floorball at the 2019 SEA Games – Women's tournament =

Floorball – Women's tournament at the 2019 SEA Games
- Venue: University of the Philippines College of Human Kinetics Gymnasium, Quezon City, Metro Manila
- Dates: 25 November – 1 December
- Competitors: 95 from 5 nations

Medalists
gold medal	Singapore (SGP)
silver medal	Thailand (THA)
bronze medal	Malaysia (MAS)

The women's floorball tournament at the 2019 SEA Games was held at the University of the Philippines College of Human Kinetics Gymnasium in Quezon City, Metro Manila, Philippines from 25 November to 1 December 2019.

== Squads ==
Indonesia (INA)	Malaysia (MAS)	Philippines (PHI)	Singapore (SGP)	Thailand (THA)
Yosi Nurmalida Pramantiara; Sherly Augusta; Rista Delina; Ayu Danita Heristika; Puti Rosalina; Jumia; Nisa Lathifah; Monika Simarmata; Daisy Salsabilah Kusuma; Desi Aris Masula; Lydia Gavrila; Maria Theodora; Katarina Kriheni Wijayanti; Brigitta; Rosi Cahya Hidayanti	Cheah Pei Yi; Michaela Khoo; Nur Dianah Athirah Zulkefley; Chriyenterl Marcus; Giam Hui Ni; Nur Syafiqah Mohd Zain; Nurfarah Syahira Md Yusof; Angelica Anthony; Teja Ellesa Mohzeiswandi; Nur Anis Amyzaa Zakaria; Ivana Sonia Beriak; Cheng Kee; Janeter Kadir; Naomi Mair Selvanayagam; Norhafizah Razali; Kuek Jimun; P. Shanggamithara; Ling Ling Ang; Fathih Hasni Che Husain; Nur Suraya Ashikin	Sarah Samonte; Angelica Bengtsson; Candy Noreen Pellejera; Jestine Mariano; Bianca Seming; Denisse Satuito; Jerymae Berdan; Clarisse Satuito; Cherrylyn Romarate; Jerylou Berdan; Pia Tolentino; Jemarie Berdan; Michelle Cruzado; Sara Elizabeth Hemmingberg; Michelle Jennifer Lindahl; Hanna-Caren Englund; Jade Rivera; Roxane Ruiz; Michele Simpson; Edelyn Embile	Yeo Xuan; Tan Hui Zhi; Jessica Chua; Mindy Lim; Siti Nurhaliza Khairul Anuar; Jerelee Ong; Pearlynn Lim; Nordiana Mohd Yeari; Yee Yun Shawn; Felicia Lim; Jowie Tan; Natalia Wee; Amanda Yeap; Lina Chu; Ong Swee Ling; Debbie Poh; Ong Hui Hui; Michelle Lok; Tiffany Ong; Fariza Begum	Sukanya Ritngam; Nipaporn Phansri; Nina Marianne Suppa; Nittaya Rungrot; Lalita Kuiraphanew; Pornsawan Soramak; Thararat Duangporn; Rungnapa Kebsomrong; Somlak Suttiprapa; Manassaree Prasanpim; Thanaporn Tongkham; Kanyanat Nakpolkrung; Natthakarn Aunjai; Suthasinee Phalaruk; Nelly Felicia Johansson; Sirinan Boonbut; Aliisa Annika Syrjaenen; Kamonwan Phumma; Soraya Klinsrisuk; Pannee Moolsan

== Results ==
All times are Philippine Standard Time (UTC+08:00)

=== Preliminaries ===
Pos	Team	Pld	W	D	L	GF	GA	GD	Pts	Final Result
1	Singapore	4	4	0	0	32	5	+27	8	Advanced to Gold medal match
2	Thailand	4	3	0	1	22	9	+13	6	Advanced to Gold medal match
3	Philippines (H)	4	1	1	2	16	19	−3	3	Advanced to Bronze medal match
4	Malaysia	4	1	1	2	16	22	−6	3	Advanced to Bronze medal match
5	Indonesia	4	0	0	4	4	35	−31	0	

Source: IFF
(H) Hosts

25 November; 10:00	Malaysia	2–8 (0–4, 0–3, 2–1)	Thailand	UP College of Human Kinetics Gym, Quezon City; Attendance: 195

Game reference

Referees:
Fajar Hidayat (Indonesia)
Yongky Priyanto (Indonesia)

	0–1	0:56 – Kuraiphanew
	0–2	2:54 – Boonbut
	0–3	3:03 – Kuraiphanew
	0–4	12:21 – Moolsan
	0–5	28:54 – Rungrot
	0–6	29:34 – Boonbut
	0–7	31:18 – Kebsomrong
Cheah – 41:32	1–7
	1–8	50:45 – Klinsrisuk
Kuek – 59:10	2–8

25 November; 13:00	Philippines	8–1 (5–1, 2–0, 1–0)	Indonesia	UP College of Human Kinetics Gym, Quezon City; Attendance: 323

Game reference

Referees:
Sharif Ismail (Singapore)
Oswind Rosayro (Singapore)

Lindahl – 2:45	1–0
	1–1	5:44 – Delina
Rivera – 9:30	2–1
Cruzado – 11:34	3–1
Rivera – 15:39	4–1
Rivera – 17:34	5–1
Cruzado – 26:41	6–1
Rivera – 38:01	7–1
Rivera – 52:20	8–1

26 November; 10:00	Singapore	8–2 (4–1, 2–0, 2–1)	Malaysia	UP College of Human Kinetics Gym, Quezon City; Attendance: 211

Game reference

Referees:
Jörgen Andersson (Sweden)
Daniel Dufvenberg (Sweden)

Yeap – 1:42	1–0
	1–1	3:21 – Kuek
Yeap – 9:26	2–1
M. Lim – 16:42	3–1
Ong SL – 17:12	4–1
Ong HH – 28:25	5–1
Ong HH – 30:44	6–1
	6–2	45:31 – Giam
Wee – 46:11	7–2
Ong SL – 47:57	8–2

26 November; 13:00	Thailand	6–3 (3–0, 2–1, 1–2)	Philippines	UP College of Human Kinetics Gym, Quezon City; Attendance: 312

Game reference

Referees:
Lee Young June (Korea)
Shin Jong Suk (Korea)

Johansson – 1:59	1–0
Syrjaenen – 5:14	2–0
Klinsrisuk – 18:41	3–0
	3–1	23:19 – Ruiz
Kuiraphanew – 23:59	4–1
Tongkham – 37:23	5–1
Johansson – 46:36	6–1
	6–2	52:32 – Lindahl
	6–3	57:39 – Cruzado

27 November; 10:00	Singapore	4–1 (2–0, 2–0, 0–1)	Thailand	UP College of Human Kinetics Gym, Quezon City; Attendance: 151

Game reference

Referees:
Fajar Hidayat (Indonesia)
Yongky Priyanto (Indonesia)

J. Ong – 1:59	1–0
J. Ong – 5:14	2–0
Anuar – 18:41	3–0
Wee – 23:59	4–0
	4–1	49:23 – Syrjaenen

27 November; 13:00	Indonesia	2–8 (1–5, 1–1, 0–2)	Malaysia	UP College of Human Kinetics Gym, Quezon City; Attendance: 167

Game reference

Referees:
Sharif Ismail (Singapore)
Oswind Rosayro (Singapore)

	0–1	0:11 – Zain
Rosalina – 3:02	1–1
	1–2	5:49 – Zulkefley
	1–3	16:12 – Zulkefley
	1–4	17:57 – Kuek
	1–5	18:43 – Zulkefley
Heristika – 28:02	2–5
	2–6	31:35 – Yusof
	2–7	52:25 – Cheng
	2–8	53:21 – Kadir

28 November; 10:00	Thailand	7–0 (1–0, 4–0, 2–0)	Indonesia	UP College of Human Kinetics Gym, Quezon City; Attendance: 223

Game reference

Referees:
Jörgen Andersson (Sweden)
Daniel Dufvenberg (Sweden)

Aunjai – 14:12	1–0
Klinsrisuk – 28:41	2–0
Syrjaenen – 33:00	3–0
Phumma – 38:33	4–0
Johansson – 39:00	5–0
Kuiraphanew – 49:55	6–0
Moolsan – 54:27	7–0

28 November; 13:00	Philippines	1–8 (0–2, 0–3, 1–3)	Singapore	UP College of Human Kinetics Gym, Quezon City; Attendance: 314

Game reference

Referees:
Fajar Hidayat (Indonesia)
Yongky Priyanto (Indonesia)

	0–1	0:45 – Ong HH
	0–2	3:50 – Ong HH
	0–3	23:34 – T. Ong
	0–4	27:48 – Lok
	0–5	28:32 – Yeap
	0–6	51:07 – Yeari
Jerylou – 56:02	1–6
	1–7	57:15– Yeari
	1–8	59:39 – Ong SL

29 November; 10:00	Indonesia	1–12 (1–4, 0–5, 0–3)	Singapore	UP College of Human Kinetics Gym, Quezon City; Attendance: 183

Game reference

Referees:
Lee Young June (Korea)
Shin Jong Suk (Korea)

	0–1	1:40 – Anuar
Jumia – 10:33	1–1
	1–2	11:17 – Yee
	1–3	15:51 – P. Lim
	1–4	16:28 – Chu
	1–5	22:27 – Yeari
	1–6	23:57 – Tan
	1–7	33:22– Anuar
	1–8	34:42 – Wee
	1–9	38:51 – P. Lim
	1–10	45:31 – Anuar
	1–11	47:55 – Yeo
	1–12	54:07 – T. Ong

29 November; 13:00	Malaysia	4–4 (1–0, 0–1, 3–3)	Philippines	UP College of Human Kinetics Gym, Quezon City; Attendance: 320

Game reference

Referees:
Fajar Hidayat (Indonesia)
Yongky Priyanto (Indonesia)

Kuek – 5:05	1–0
	1–1	29:47 – Rivera
Ling – 46:55	2–1
	2–2	49:19 – Ruiz
Yusof – 50:26	3–2
	3–3	50:56 – Cruzado
Mohzeiswandi – 55:43	4–3
	4–4	57:58 – Ruiz

=== Final round ===
==== Bronze medal match ====
1 December; 09:00	Philippines	0–1 OT (0–0, 0–0, 0–0, 0–1)	Malaysia	UP College of Human Kinetics Gym, Quezon City; Attendance: 484

Game reference
	Referees: Fajar Hidayat (Indonesia); Yongky Priyanto (Indonesia)
0–1 / 65:39 – Yusof	Referees: Fajar Hidayat (Indonesia); Yongky Priyanto (Indonesia)

==== Gold medal match ====
1 December; 12:00	Singapore	3–2 (1–1, 0–1, 2–0)	Thailand	UP College of Human Kinetics Gym, Quezon City; Attendance: 516

Game reference

Referees:
Lee Young June (Korea)
Shin Jong Suk (Korea)

Wee – 6:28	1–0
	1–1	7:46 – Tongkham
	1–2	24:26 – Aunjai
Yeap – 41:51	2–2
J. Ong – 57:48	3–2

== See also ==
- Men's tournament
