= Philippines women's national floorball team =

- Founded: 2014
- Coach: (Philippines) Noel Johansson
- Captain: Jade Rivera
- First game: 0–18, vs. Malaysia (Singapore, December 18, 2014)
- Largest win: 9–0, vs. Indonesia (Singapore, May 23, 2022)
- Largest defeat: 0–18, vs. Malaysia (Singapore, December 18, 2014); 0–18, vs. Singapore (Singapore, December 19, 2014)

The Philippines women's national floorball team is the women's national floorball team of the Philippines and is organized by Philippine Floorball Association.

== History ==
The women's national team made their debut at the 2014 Southeast Asian Floorball Championships which was hosted in Singapore. The Philippines lost all its four games at its first tournament against the national teams of Indonesia, Malaysia and Singapore.

The Philippines participated in the 2018 Women's Asia-Oceania Floorball Cup which was also hosted Singapore. They lost their first group stage matches against Malaysia and Japan but won 12-6 over Iran. They finished fifth defeating India, 8-6 in their final classification match.

The Philippines made their first attempt to qualify for the Women's World Floorball Championship in 2019. The participated in the Asia Oceania qualifiers for the 2019 edition with the intention of using the qualification tournament as preparation for the country's hosting of the floorball event of the 2019 Southeast Asian Games. They lost all their matches placing last among eight teams conceding a narrow 3–4 loss to South Korea in the 7th-place play-off.

The team participated in the 30th Southeast Asian Games, held in the Philippines, at the University of the Philippines College of Human Kinetics Gym. In total, there were 5 countries competing in Floorball for both men and women: Philippines, Singapore, Indonesia, Malaysia and Thailand. The Philippines women's team did well on their first match, winning 8–1 against Indonesia. The team finished the tournament at 4th place, losing to Malaysia 0–1 at over time during the Bronze medal match.

The Philippines sweep all games of the preliminary round of the 2022 Women's Asia-Oceania Floorball Cup. However the Philippines lost its rematch against host Singapore in the final.

They returned for the 2023 edition of the Southeast Asian Games where they finished as bronze medalists.

=== Colors ===
Kit suppliers of the Philippines women's national floorball team
Outfitter		Usage	
Outfitter		From	Until
(Germany)	Erima	current	

== Records ==
=== World Championships ===
Women's World Floorball Championship
Year	Round	Position	Pld	W	D	L	GF	GA	+/-
(Finland) 2015 (Sweden) 2017	—N/a	Did not enter							
(Switzerland) 2019	—N/a	Did not qualify							
Total	0 titles	-	-	-	-	-	-	-	-

=== Asia-Oceania Floorball Cup ===
Asia-Oceania Floorball Cup
Year	Round	Position	Pld	W	D	L	GF	GA	+/-
(Singapore) 2018	Group stage	5th place	6	3	0	3	30	42	-12
(Singapore) 2022	Finals	2nd place	6	5	0	1	34	11	+23
Total	0 titles	2nd place	12	8	0	4	64	53	11

=== Southeast Asian Floorball Championships ===
Southeast Asian Floorball Championships
Year	Round	Position	Pld	W	D	L	GF	GA	+/-
(Singapore) 2014	Group stage	4th place	4	0	0	4	3	60	-57
Total	0 titles	Fourth place	4	0	0	4	3	60	-57

=== Southeast Asian Games ===
Southeast Asian Games
Year	Round	Position	Pld	W	D	L	GF	GA	+/-
(Singapore) 2015	—N/a	Withdrew							
(Philippines) 2019	Group stage	4th place	5	1	1	3	16	20	–4
(Cambodia) 2023	Bronze Medal Match	3rd place	5	2	1	2	22	21	+1
Total	0 titles	3rd place	10	3	2	5	38	41	–3

== Players ==
The following are listed on IFF website."Team - Philippines Women".

Goalkeepers
Number	Player name	Club
25	Pia Tolentino	(Singapore) Wonderbelles FC
67	Loella Andersson	(Sweden) Åstorp/Kvidinge IBS
Defender
Number	Player name	Club
5	Angelica Bengtsson	(Sweden) Sandvikens AIK
15	Ronalynn Ranta	(Finland) SB Pro
17	Helena Vaha-Nissi	(Finland) Northern Stars
42	Evelina Skarfeldt	(Sweden) Fagerhult/Habo IB
77	Michelle Cortina	(Sweden) Älvsjö AIK
Forwards
Number	Player name	Club
3	Keziah Rezemae Espidillon	(Singapore) Tampines FC
11	Heidi Hyryläinen	(Finland) Jokerit SB
13	Dianne Lyn Villegas	(Sweden) Hultsberg IBF
19	Annicah Cahatian	
24	Edelyn Embile	(Singapore) Merahan Knightingales
26	Julia Martinsson	(Sweden) Järfälla IBK
28	Nathalie Sundin	(Sweden) Bälinge IF
68	Hanna Sofia Kronstrand	(Sweden) Nacka Wallenstam IBK
82	Hanna Caren Esteves	(Sweden) Älvsjö AIK
92	Roxane Ruiz	(Singapore) Team U Sports Liitto FC

=== Management ===
Head coach	(Philippines) Noel Alm Johansson
Coach	(Sweden) Fredrik Nyback
Team Official	(Sweden) Kennet Andersson
Coach	(Singapore) Jenmark Sorreda
Equipment Manager	(Sweden) Mathilda Engroth
