= Floorball at the 2019 SEA Games – Men's tournament =

Floorball – Men's tournament at the 2019 SEA Games
- Venue: University of the Philippines College of Human Kinetics Gymnasium, Quezon City, Metro Manila
- Dates: 25 November – 1 December
- Competitors: 95 from 5 nations

Medalists
gold medal	Thailand (THA)
silver medal	Singapore (SGP)
bronze medal	Malaysia (MAS)

The men's floorball tournament at the 2019 SEA Games was held at the University of the Philippines College of Human Kinetics Gymnasium in Quezon City, Metro Manila, Philippines from 25 November to 1 December 2019.

== Squads ==
Indonesia (INA)	Malaysia (MAS)	Philippines (PHI)	Singapore (SGP)	Thailand (THA)
Vincentsius Purana; Janter Kalvin Tampubolon; Epul Saepuloh; Fahmi Azhari; Gharib Khotibul Umam; Vigya Satria Pramanthana; Kiki Rasyid; Rizqi Dipi Arifiandi; Ahmad Isnaini; Alden Hidayat; Rudy Kurniawan; Bayu Munandar; Achmad Dandika; Deniardi; Abid Agung Prasetyo	Daniel Teoh; Adrian Koay; Indy Benjamin Toh; Lim Kai Sheng; Faris Maznan; Tristan James; Danial Mohd Azri; Zephaniah Chong; Fabian Chow; Zachary Choo; Benedict Yeoh; Chong Han Keong; Eugene Lai; Teh Chin Hong; Shukri Shamidi; Kang Jing Hong; Chiam Ter Min; Kao Lin Ken; Amirul Akmar Amir; Iman Nazirul	Ralph Ramos; Jason Florentino; Luis Manila III; Hazzer Talingdan; Patrik Schoultze; Henrik Dahmen; Henielee Pastor; Lucas Oijvall; Yves Gelangre; Christian Schoultze; Jan Vitaliano; Aristeo Perol II; Christopher Holland; Ryan Hallden; Renzo Fabon; Ysaac Gelangre; Fredrik Dahmen; Jayson Palinsad; Jan Bryant Arocena; Russel Vincent Alido	Akmal Shaharudin; Haleef Hairon; Gary Wong; Lee Chee Yong; Syazni Ramlee; Jenmark Sorreda; Ng Juin Jie; Farhan Yusoff; Sean Huang; Joshua Seow; Glendon Phua; M Devanand; R Suria; Chan Li Yang; Yeung Chun Yin; Yeo Kaixiang; Lim Jian Hong; Thaddeus Tan; Jeremy Chia; Tng Zong Wei	Auttachai Sohtree; Pi Chaiyakul; Tnakit Kayairit; Natthawut Dueankhao; Prakasit Namsawang; Alexander Rinefalk; Anupong Srisahwat; Chaianon Sanas; Surapong Sangmongkhol; Santipong Sukkasem; Watcharapon Onsuk; Pawat Thaidit; Khemmathat Chummak; Jeerayut Yaemyim; Chusak Narkprasert; Veerasak Pimpa; Patiwat Kaewsuwan; Aphichet Ratanaprathum; Anothai Promli; Christian Karlsson

== Results ==
All times are Philippine Standard Time (UTC+08:00)

=== Preliminaries ===
Pos	Team	Pld	W	D	L	GF	GA	GD	Pts	Final Result
1	Thailand	4	3	1	0	47	19	+28	7	Advanced to Gold medal match
2	Singapore	4	3	1	0	27	12	+15	7	Advanced to Gold medal match
3	Philippines (H)	4	2	0	2	19	30	−11	4	Advanced to Bronze medal match
4	Malaysia	4	1	0	3	23	32	−9	2	Advanced to Bronze medal match
5	Indonesia	4	0	0	4	9	32	−23	0	

Source: IFF
(H) Hosts

25 November; 16:00	Malaysia	6–13 (3–4, 1–7, 2–2)	Thailand	UP College of Human Kinetics Gym, Quezon City; Attendance: 360

Game reference

Referees:
Lee Young June (Korea)
Shin Jong Suk (Korea)

Koay – 0:26	1–0
Maznan – 5:46	2–0
	2–1	8:15 – Rinefalk
Chiam – 15:30	3–1
	3–2	17:10 – Kayairit
	3–3	17:54 – Namsawang
	3–4	19:08 – Narkprasert
Lai – 20:34	4–4
	4–5	21:45 – Onsuk
	4–6	21:52 – Yaemyim
	4–7	22:34 – Onsuk
	4–8	24:57 – Pimpa
	4–9	27:59 – Yaemyim
	4–10	36:02 – Sukkasem
	4–11	38:48 – Kayairit
	4–12	55:58 – Thaidit
Chong – 56:07	5–12
Chiam –57:13	6–12
	6–13	59:31 – Thaidit

25 November; 19:00	Philippines	5–4 (0–1, 2–1, 3–2)	Indonesia	UP College of Human Kinetics Gym, Quezon City; Attendance: 408

Game reference

Referees:
Jörgen Andersson (Sweden)
Daniel Dufvenberg (Sweden)

	0–1	6:31 – Munandar
	0–2	35:54 – Tampubolon
C. Schoultze – 38:37	1–2
C. Schoultze – 38:46	2–2
C. Schoultze – 46:31	3–2
C. Schoultze – 48:13	4–2
	4–3	48:37 – Kurniawan
	4–4	53:59 – Kurniawan
Hallden – 59:16	5–4

26 November; 16:00	Singapore	9–2 (3–1, 3–0, 3–1)	Malaysia	UP College of Human Kinetics Gym, Quezon City; Attendance: 270

Game reference

Referees:
Fajar Hidayat (Indonesia)
Yongky Priyanto (Malaysia)

Ramli – 6:51	1–0
Tng – 9:21	2–0
Lee – 11:24	3–0
	3–1	19:01 – Chow
Shaharudin – 30:27	4–1
Shaharudin – 33:56	5–1
Suria – 38:09	6–1
Ng – 55:55	7–1
(own goal) – 56:52	8–1
	8–2	56:58 – Azri
Lee – 59:49	9–2

26 November; 19:00	Thailand	14–4 (6–1, 5–0, 3–3)	Philippines	UP College of Human Kinetics Gym, Quezon City; Attendance: 386

Game reference

Referees:
Sharil Ismail (Singapore)
Oswind Rosayro (Singapore)

Pimpa – 5:15	1–0
Yaemyim – 5:30	2–0
Sangmongkhol – 6:11	3–0
	3–1	6:58 – Chow
Rinefalk – 12:56	4–1
Sukkasem – 15:42	5–1
Narkprasert – 16:20	6–1
Yaemyim – 28:04	7–1
Rinefalk – 30:03	8–1
Yaemyim – 30:22	9–1
Thaidit – 30:56	10–1
Rinefalk – 38:54	11–1
Thaidit – 40:07	12–1
	12–2	43:03 – C. Schoultze
	12–3	49:35 – Oijvall
Onsuk – 50:25	13–3
Dueankhao – 52:06	14–3
	14–4	54:16 – Perol

27 November; 16:00	Singapore	7–7 (3–3, 1–2, 3–2)	Thailand	UP College of Human Kinetics Gym, Quezon City; Attendance: 223

Game reference

Referees:
Jörgen Andersson (Sweden)
Daniel Dufvenberg (Sweden)

Shaharudin – 1:50	1–0
Suria – 2:57	2–0
	2–1	3:46 – Sukkasem
	2–2	15:21 – Onsuk
Lee – 16:35	3–2
	3–3	17:15 – Sukkasem
	3–4	21:38 – Narkprasert
Shaharudin – 26:43	4–4
	4–5	35:56 – Thaidit
Suria – 41:47	5–5
Suria – 43:23	6–5
	6–6	47:10 – Yaemyim
	6–7	48:16 – Rinefalk
Lee – 53:58	7–7

27 November; 19:00	Indonesia	2–8 (0–2, 0–2, 2–4)	Malaysia	UP College of Human Kinetics Gym, Quezon City; Attendance: 175

Game reference

Referees:
Lee Young June (Korea)
Shin Jong Suk (Korea)

	0–1	2:25 – Chong HK
	0–2	12:57 – Lim
	0–3	29:30 – Chow
	0–4	39:47 – Teh
	0–5	41:29 – Amir
	0–6	46:42 – Z. Chong
Pramanthana – 51:22	1–6
	1–7	52:22 – Maznan
Tampubolon – 54:15	2–7
	2–8	56:16 – Chiam

28 November; 16:00	Thailand	13–2 (3–1, 6–1, 4–0)	Indonesia	UP College of Human Kinetics Gym, Quezon City; Attendance: 231

Game reference

Referees:
Sharil Ismail (Singapore)
Oswind Rosayro (Singapore)

Kayairit – 12:32	1–0
	1–1	13:29 – Umam
Sukkasem – 14:22	2–1
Pramanthana – 19:44	3–1
Sukkasem – 21:22	4–1
Yaemyim – 22:40	5–1
	5–2	23:24 – Azhari
Yaemyim – 26:14	6–2
Rinefalk – 26:34	7–2
Rinefalk – 31:16	8–2
Onsuk – 37:20	9–2
Rinefalk – 44:17	10–2
Kaewsuwan – 47:02	11–2
Sukkasem – 47:41	12–2
Rinefalk – 53:38	13–2

28 November; 19:00	Philippines	2–5 (1–1, 1–3, 0–1)	Singapore	UP College of Human Kinetics Gym, Quezon City; Attendance: 709

Game reference

Referees:
Lee Young June (Korea)
Shin Jong Suk (Korea)

Hallden – 3:05	1–0
	1–1	15:37 – Suria
	1–2	20:35 – Ramlee
	1–3	22:59 – Chia
C. Schoultze – 26:30	2–3
	2–4	33:36 – Suria
	2–5	47:46 – Ng

29 November; 16:00	Indonesia	1–6 (0–2, 0–1, 1–3)	Singapore	UP College of Human Kinetics Gym, Quezon City; Attendance: 215

Game reference

Referees:
Jörgen Andersson (Sweden)
Daniel Dufvenberg (Sweden)

	0–1	3:10 – Phua
	0–2	18:04 – Tng
	0–3	30:23 – Tan
	0–4	43:07 – Tan
	0–5	45:18 – Phua
Dandika – 49:44	1–5
	1–6	52:04 – Chan

29 November; 19:00	Malaysia	7–8 (2–3, 4–1, 1–4)	Philippines	UP College of Human Kinetics Gym, Quezon City; Attendance: 618

Game reference

Referees:
Sharil Ismail (Singapore)
Oswind Rosayro (Singapore)

	0–1	5:01 – C. Schoultze
	0–2	8:03 – Talingdan
	0–3	11:23 – P. Schoultze
Chiam – 11:39	1–3
Lai – 18:46	2–3
Chiam – 29:15	3–3
Koay – 31:22	4–3
	4–4	32:02 – Oijvall
Maznan – 35:35	5–4
Benjamin – 36:54	6–4
Nazirul – 44:10	7–4
	7–5	46:15 – C. Schoultze
	7–6	53:30 – Dahmen
	7–7	58:35 – Holland
	7–8	59:59 – Oijvall

=== Final round ===
==== Bronze medal match ====
1 December; 16:00	Philippines	4–7 (2–1, 1–3, 1–3)	Malaysia	UP College of Human Kinetics Gym, Quezon City; Attendance: 860

Game reference

Referees:
Sharil Ismail (Singapore)
Oswind Rosayro (Singapore)

C. Schoultze – 6:04	1–0
	1–1	15:51 – Benjamin
Perol – 18:55	2–1
	2–2	23:47 – Lai
	2–3	25:09 – James
	2–4	29:16 – Lai
Dahmen – 35:47	3–4
	3–5	42:35 – Choo
	3–6	45:07 – Chow
	3–7	49:20 – Maznan
C. Schoultze – 55:08	4–7

==== Gold medal match ====
1 December; 19:00	Thailand	8–8 OT (2–1 SO); 2–3, 2–3, 4–1, 0–0	Singapore	UP College of Human Kinetics Gym, Quezon City; Attendance: 658

Game reference

Referees:
Jörgen Andersson (Sweden)
Daniel Dufvenberg (Sweden)

	0–1	3:29 – Sorreda
Thaidit – 4:49	1–1
Narkprasert – 7:27	2–1
	2–2	16:10 – Suria
	2–3	17:41 – Sorreda
	2–4	29:58 – Ng
Sukkasem – 30:49	3–4
	3–5	30:59 – Lee
	3–6	32:43 – Tng
	3–7	33:05 – Suria
Thaidit – 34:27	4–7
	4–8	47:04 – Phua
Sukkasem – 48:17	5–8
Yaemyim – 51:31	6–8
Sukkasem – 54:47	7–8
Kayairit – 57:52	8–8

Sukkasem (miss)
Pimpa (miss)
Rinefalk
Kayairit
Thaidit (miss)
Shootout
(miss) Phua
(miss) Ramlee
Shaharudin
(miss) Wong
(miss) Suria

== See also ==
- Women's tournament
