= Philippine Floorball Association =

Sports governing body in the Philippines

- IOC nation: PHI
- Sport: Floorball

History
- Year of formation: April 4, 2011; 15 years ago
- Former names: Floorball Philippines

Affiliations
- International federation: International Floorball Federation (IFF)
- IFF member since: May 8, 2011; 14 years ago
- Continental association: Asia Oceania Floorball Confederation
- National Olympic Committee: Philippine Olympic Committee

Elected
- President: Ralph Ramos

Secretariat
- Secretary General: Rochel Balares

Philippine Floorball Association formerly known as the Floorball Philippines is the governing body of floorball in the Philippines.

== History ==
Floorball in the Philippines was introduced around the early 2000s when the Ateneo de Manila High School received equipment. However it was only 2008 when they was a concerted effort to promote floorball with Kreative Kids along with Athletes In Action held free sporting clinics and training in various schools and universities in the country. Scandinavia missionary Fredrik Bergren taught the sport to urban poor individuals.

The sporting body was founded as Floorball Philippines, Inc. on April 4, 2011 with its registration at the Securities and Exchange Commission. On May 8, 2011, FP was admitted as the 53rd member of the International Floorball Federation. The sports body organized the first season of the Philippine Floorball League in 2012.

FP sent the first ever men's and women's national teams at the 1st SEA Floorball Championships in Singapore.

FP became the Philippine Floorball Association (PFA) on April 10, 2015 by four clubs from four school institutions; University of the Philippines, University of Makati, University of Asia and the Pacific (UA&P Dragons), and the De La Salle Zobel.

== List of presidents ==
- Ryan Elizaga (2011–2014)
- Renato Bravo(2014–?)
- Ralph Ramos

== Member clubs ==
As of April 2024

Regular

- Amoranto QC Floorball Club
- Cavite Floorball Club
- De La Salle Araneta Floorball Club
- De La Salle Manila Floorball Club
- De La Salle Zobel Floorball Club
- Outliers Floorball Club
- OnlineFactory Orcas Floorball Club
- Proverbs Floorball Club
- UA&P Dragons Floorball Club
- United South Floorball Club
- University of Makati Floorball Club
- University of the Philippines Floorball Club

Provisional

- Assumption Makati Floorball Club
- Ateneo de Manila Floorball Club
- Maryknollers Floorball Club
- Our Lady of Guadalupe Floorball Club
- San Carlos Cebu Floorball Club
- Keys School Manila Floorball Club
- Domuschola Floorball Club
