= 2014 Southeast Asian Floorball Championships =

Tournament details
- Host country: Singapore
- Venue(s): 1 (in 1 host city)
- Dates: 18–21 December
- Teams: 8

2014 Southeast Asian Floorball Championships is the inaugural edition of the Southeast Asian Floorball Championships hosted at the Hougang Sports Complex in Singapore from 18–21 December 2014. Four nations participated at the tournament with Indonesia and the Philippines making their international debut in both men's and women's floorball.

== Results ==
=== Men's ===
2014 Southeast Asian Floorball Championships – Men's
Tournament details
- Venue(s): 1 (in 1 host city)
- Teams: 4

Final positions
- Champions: Singapore (1st title)
- Runner-up: Malaysia
- Third place: Indonesia

Tournament statistics
- Matches played: 8
- Goals scored: 76 (9.5 per match)
- Scoring leader(s): (Malaysia) Ter Min Chiam (9 points)

==== Preliminary round ====
Team advanced to final
Team advanced to third-place playoff

Team	Pld	W	D	L	GF	GA	GD	Pts
Singapore	3	3	0	0	25	3	+22	6
Malaysia	3	2	0	1	19	9	+10	4
Indonesia	3	1	0	2	9	18	−9	2
Philippines	3	0	0	3	3	26	−23	0

18 December 2014; 14:00	Indonesia	1 – 9 (1–1, 0–6, 0–2)	Singapore	Hougang Sports Complex, Hougang; Attendance: 103

Game reference

18 December 2014; 16:30	Singapore	11 – 0 (5–0, 4–0, 2–0)	Philippines	Hougang Sports Complex, Hougang; Attendance: 114

Game reference

19 December 2014; 11:34	Philippines	2 – 7 (0–4, 0–1, 2–2)	Indonesia	Hougang Sports Complex, Hougang; Attendance: 75

Game reference

19 December 2014; 19:00	Malaysia	2 – 7 (1–0, 1–4, 0–3)	Singapore	Hougang Sports Complex, Hougang

Game reference

20 December 2014; 14:02	Malaysia	8 – 1 (2–1, 3–0, 3–0)	Philippines	Hougang Sports Complex, Hougang; Attendance: 98

Game reference

20 December 2014; 16:30	Singapore	7 – 1 (3–1, 3–0, 1–0)	Indonesia	Hougang Sports Complex, Hougang; Attendance: 124

Game reference

==== Third place playoff ====
21 December 2014; 12:32	Indonesia	6 – 1 (2–1, 1–0, 3–0)	Philippines	Hougang Sports Complex, Hougang; Attendance: 55

Game reference

==== Final ====
21 December 2014; 17:32	Singapore	9 – 4 (3–2, 6–0, 0–2)	Malaysia	Hougang Sports Complex, Hougang; Attendance: 224

Game reference

=== Women's ===
2014 Southeast Asian Floorball Championships – Women's
Tournament details
- Venue(s): 1 (in 1 host city)
- Teams: 4

Final positions
- Champions: Singapore (1st title)
- Runner-up: Malaysia
- Third place: Indonesia

Tournament statistics
- Matches played: 8
- Goals scored: 97 (12.13 per match)
- Attendance: 858 (107 per match)
- Scoring leader(s): (Malaysia) Jumia (Malaysia) Zulita Dwi Aprilia (11 points)

Team advanced to final
Team advanced to third-place playoff

==== Preliminary round ====
Team	Pld	W	D	L	GF	GA	GD	Pts
Singapore	3	3	0	0	33	0	+33	6
Malaysia	3	1	1	1	22	11	+11	3
Indonesia	3	1	1	1	13	14	−1	3
Philippines	3	0	0	3	2	45	−43	0

18 December 2014; 11:34	Malaysia	18 – 0 (7–0, 4–0, 7–0)	Philippines	Hougang Sports Complex, Hougang; Attendance: 83

Game reference

18 December 2014; 19:00	Singapore	8 – 0 (1–0, 3–0, 4–0)	Indonesia	Hougang Sports Complex, Hougang; Attendance: 145

Game reference

19 December 2014; 14:00	Indonesia	4 – 4 (2–0, 0–3, 2–1)	Malaysia	Hougang Sports Complex, Hougang; Attendance: 108

Game reference

19 December 2014; 16:27	Philippines	0 – 18 (0–4, 0–6, 0–8)	Singapore	Hougang Sports Complex, Hougang; Attendance: 212

Game reference

20 December 2014; 11:32	Philippines	2 – 9 (1–1, 1–6, 0–2)	Indonesia	Hougang Sports Complex, Hougang; Attendance: 57

Game reference

20 December 2014; 19:03	Malaysia	0 – 7 (0–4, 0–2, 0–1)	Singapore	Hougang Sports Complex, Hougang; Attendance: 253

Game reference

==== Third place playoff ====
21 December 2014; 10:03	Indonesia	15 – 1 (6–0, 6–1, 3–0)	Philippines	Hougang Sports Complex, Hougang; Attendance: 45

Game reference

==== Final ====
21 December 2014; 15:03	Singapore	9 – 2 (0–1, 6–0, 3–1)	Malaysia	Hougang Sports Complex, Hougang; Attendance: 178

Game reference
