= Southeast Asian Floorball Championships =

Tournament information
- Sport: Floorball

Most recent tournament
- 2014

Final champion
- M: Singapore; W: Singapore

The Southeast Asian Floorball Championships was an international floorball competition of the Southeast Asian nations. It was held only once in 2014 and took place in Singapore.

== Summaries ==
=== Men's ===
Year	Host	Final			Third Place Match
Year	Host	Champion	Score	Runner-up	Third Place	Score	Fourth Place
2014; Details	Singapore	Singapore	9–4	Malaysia	Indonesia	6–1	Philippines

=== Women's ===
Year	Host	Final			Third Place Match
Year	Host	Champion	Score	Runner-up	Third Place	Score	Fourth Place
2014; Details	Singapore	Singapore	9–2	Malaysia	Indonesia	15–1	Philippines
