= 2019 Men's Asia-Oceania Floorball Cup =

Tournament details
- Host country: Philippines
- Venue(s): 1 (in 1 host city)
- Dates: 7–12 July 2019
- Teams: 8

Final positions
- Champions: Singapore (1st title)
- Runners-up: Thailand
- Third place: Philippines
- Fourth place: South Korea

Tournament statistics
- Matches played: 22
- Goals scored: 284 (12.91 per match)
- Scoring leader(s): (Thailand) Watcharapon Onsuk (18 points)

The 2019 Men's Asia-Oceania Floorball Cup was a continental floorball tournament held in Biñan, Philippines from 7–12 July 2019. Matches was held at the Alonte Sports Arena.

Singapore clinched the title after winning 17–1 over defending champions Thailand

== Venue ==
Biñan
Alonte Sports Arena	Alonte Sports Arena (Luzon)
Capacity: 6,500	Alonte Sports Arena (Luzon)

== Preliminary round ==
=== Group A ===
Team	Pld	W	D	L	GF	GA	GD	Pts	Qualification
Thailand	3	2	0	1	23	13	+10	4	Semifinals
South Korea	3	2	0	1	28	13	+15	4	Quarterfinals
Malaysia	3	2	0	1	14	12	+2	4	Quarterfinals
Pakistan	3	0	0	3	5	31	−26	0	Classification 5th–8th

7 July 2019; 10:03	Thailand	6 – 7	South Korea	Alonte Sports Arena, Biñan

Game reference

7 July 2019; 13:00	Malaysia	5 – 1	Pakistan	Alonte Sports Arena, Biñan; Attendance: 133

Game reference

8 July 2019; 10:01	South Korea	18 – 2	Pakistan	Alonte Sports Arena, Biñan; Attendance: 22

Game reference

8 July 2019; 13:00	Thailand	8 – 4	Malaysia	Alonte Sports Arena, Biñan; Attendance: 199

Game reference

9 July 2019; 10:00	Pakistan	2 – 9	Thailand	Alonte Sports Arena, Biñan; Attendance: 79

Game reference

9 July 2019; 13:00	South Korea	3 – 5	Malaysia	Alonte Sports Arena, Biñan; Attendance: 175

Game reference

=== Group B ===
Team	Pld	W	D	L	GF	GA	GD	Pts	Qualification
Singapore	3	3	0	0	43	11	+32	6	Semifinals
Philippines	3	2	0	1	12	24	−12	4	Quarterfinals
Japan	3	1	0	2	12	21	−9	2	Quarterfinals
India	3	0	0	3	12	30	−18	0	Classification 5th–8th

7 July 2019; 16:03	Philippines	5 – 4	India	Alonte Sports Arena, Biñan

Game reference

7 July 2019; 19:30	Singapore	10 – 1	Japan	Alonte Sports Arena, Biñan; Attendance: 100

Game reference

8 July 2019; 16:00	Japan	9 – 6	India	Alonte Sports Arena, Biñan; Attendance: 254

Game reference

8 July 2019; 19:00	Singapore	17 – 2	Philippines	Alonte Sports Arena, Biñan; Attendance: 359

Game reference

9 July 2019; 16:00	India	2 – 16	Singapore	Alonte Sports Arena, Biñan; Attendance: 116

Game reference

9 July 2019; 19:00	Japan	3 – 5	Philippines	Alonte Sports Arena, Biñan; Attendance: 271

Game reference

== Final round ==
Quarterfinals
South Korea	6
Japan	2
Singapore
bye
Philippines	5
Malaysia	4
Thailand
bye

Semifinals
Singapore	13
South Korea	1
Thailand	13
Philippines	7

Final
Singapore	17
Thailand	1
Third place game
South Korea	5
Philippines	5 (1)

Classification Semifinals
Pakistan	2
Japan	10
India	9
Malaysia	10

Fifth place game
Japan	9
Malaysia	5
Seventh place game
Pakistan	5
India	9

=== Quarterfinals ===
10 July 2019; 17:00	South Korea	6 – 2	Japan	Alonte Sports Arena, Biñan; Attendance: 148

Game reference

10 July 2019; 20:00	Philippines	5 – 4	Malaysia	Alonte Sports Arena, Biñan; Attendance: 351

Game reference

=== Semifinals ===
11 July 2019; 19:00	Singapore	13 – 1	South Korea	Alonte Sports Arena, Biñan; Attendance: 457

Game reference

11 July 2019; 16:00	Thailand	13 – 7	Philippines	Alonte Sports Arena, Biñan; Attendance: 555

Game reference

=== Classification 5th–8th ===
11 July 2019; 9:59	Pakistan	2 – 10	Japan	Alonte Sports Arena, Biñan; Attendance: 180

Game reference

11 July 2019; 13:00	India	9 – 10	Malaysia	Alonte Sports Arena, Biñan; Attendance: 304

Game reference

Seventh place playoff

12 July 2019; 9:00	Pakistan	5 – 9	India	Alonte Sports Arena, Biñan; Attendance: 55

Game reference

Fifth place playoff

12 July 2019; 12:00	Japan	9 – 5	Malaysia	Alonte Sports Arena, Biñan; Attendance: 201

Game reference

=== Playoffs ===
==== Bronze medal match ====
12 July 2019; 15:00	Philippines	6 – 5 OT	South Korea	Alonte Sports Arena, Biñan; Attendance: 414

Game reference

==== Final ====
12 July 2019; 18:04	Thailand	1 – 17	Singapore	Alonte Sports Arena, Biñan; Attendance: 475

Game reference

== Final standing ==
The official IFF final ranking of the tournament:

Rank	Team
Gold medal	Singapore
Silver medal	Thailand
Bronze medal	Philippines
4	South Korea
5	Japan
6	Malaysia
7	India
8	Pakistan
