= Thailand men's national floorball team =

- Founded: 2015
- Coach: (Singapore) Kenneth Koh
- IFF Ranking: 13th (2024)
- Championships: Asia-Oceania Floorball Cup: 1st (2017, 2023)

The Thailand men's national floorball team is the national floorball team of Thailand and is organized by Floorball Thailand which is under the care of the Thailand Hockey Association.

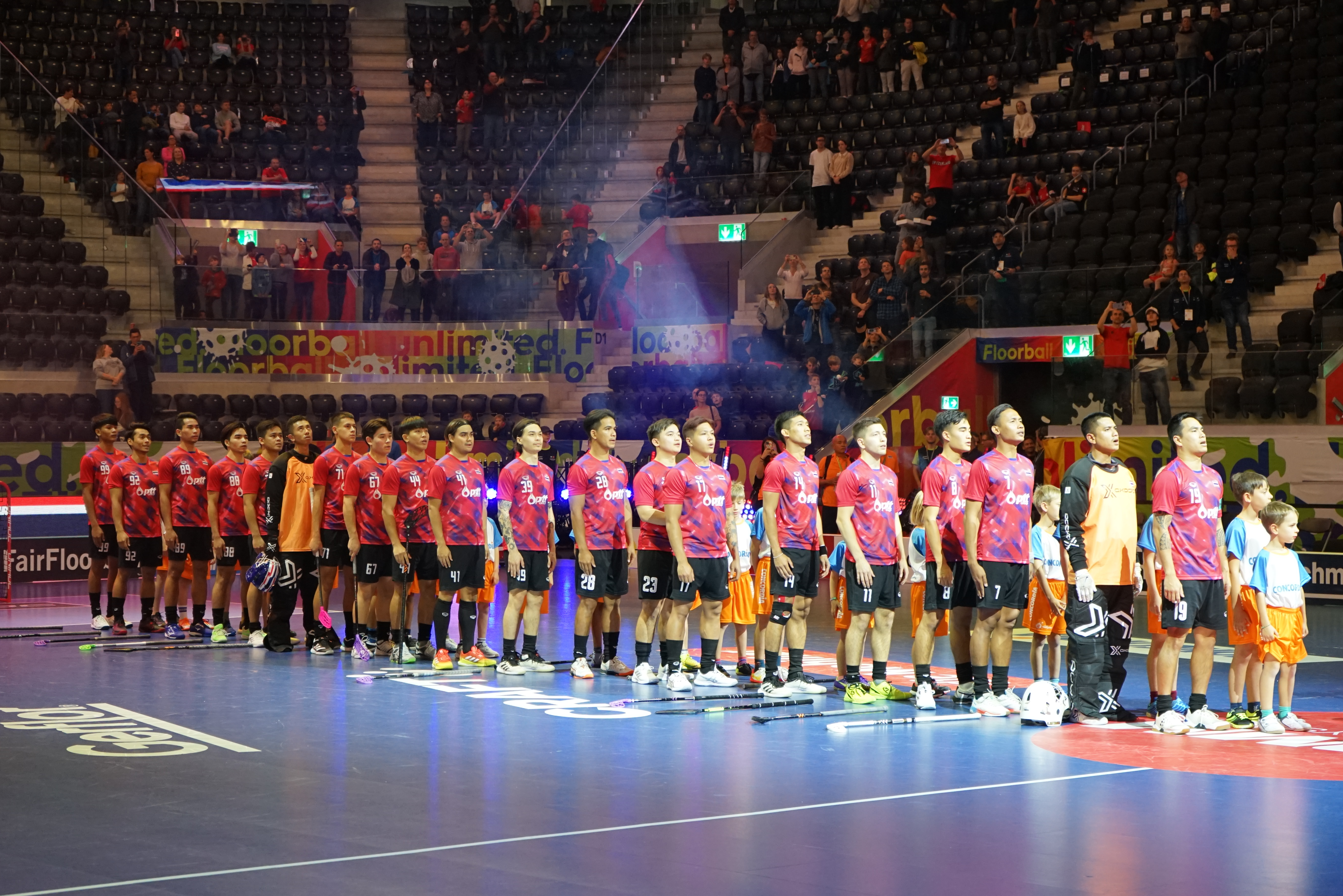
The Thailand national team at the 2022 World Championships

They are the winners of Asia-Oceania Floorball Cup in 2017 and 2023 defeating Singapore both times. Their biggest success on World Floorball Championship is 13th place in 2020. Thailand is ranked 13th in the IFF ranking, following their 14th-place finishes at the World Championships in 2024 and 2022.

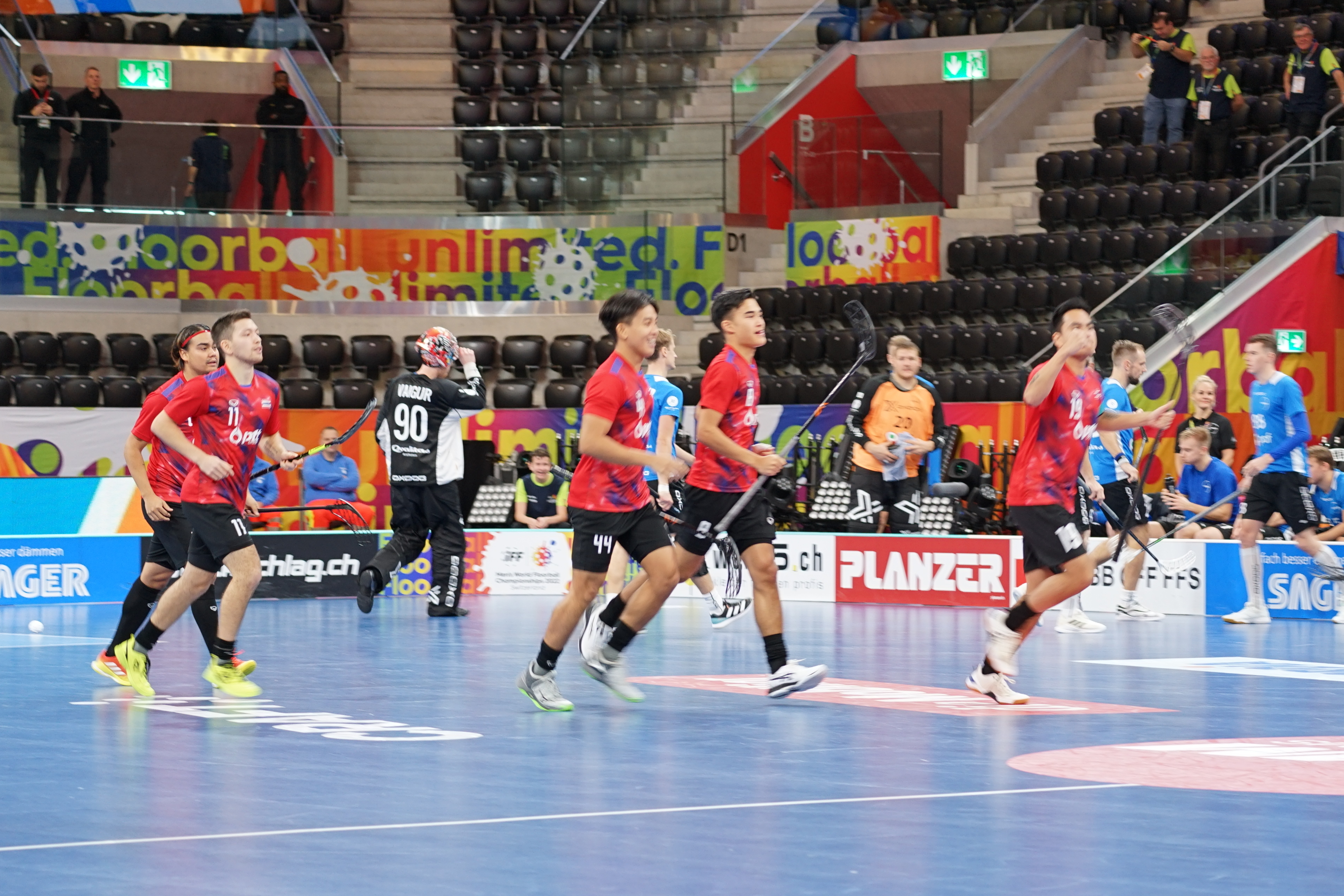
Thailand national team players celebrate a goal at the 2022 World Championships

== World championships ==
| Year | Hosting Country | Rank | Final match |
|---|---|---|---|
| 2016 | Latvia | 14th place | Poland 4–5 |
| 2018 | Czech Republic | 14th place | Poland 1–9 |
| 2020 | Finland | 13th place | Philippines 9–8 PS |
| 2022 | Switzerland | 14th place | Australia 5–6 |
| 2024 | Sweden | 14th place | Slovenia 4–6 |

== World Games ==
| Year | Hosting Country | Rank | Final match |
|---|---|---|---|
| 2022 | USA | 7th place | United States 7–3 |

== AOFC Cup ==
| Year | Hosting Country | Rank | Final match |
|---|---|---|---|
| 2017 | Thailand | 1st place | Singapore 8–4 |
| 2019 | Philippines | 2nd place | Singapore 1–17 |
| 2023 | Singapore | 1st place | Singapore 4–2 |
| 2025 | China | 2nd place | Singapore 7–8 |

== Records ==
=== World Floorball Championships ===
| Tournament | GP | W | D | L | GF | GA | +/- | Place |
|---|---|---|---|---|---|---|---|---|
| 2016 Latvia | 5 | 2 | 0 | 3 | 24 | 20 | +4 | 14th |
| 2018 Czechia | 5 | 1 | 0 | 4 | 14 | 32 | -18 | 14th |
| 2020 Finland | 5 | 3 | 0 | 2 | 37 | 40 | -3 | 13th |
| 2022 Switzerland | 5 | 2 | 0 | 3 | 34 | 44 | -10 | 14th |
| Total | 20 | 8 | 0 | 12 | 109 | 136 | -27 | |

=== Asia-Oceania Floorball Cup ===
| Tournament | GP | W | D | L | GF | GA | +/- | Place |
|---|---|---|---|---|---|---|---|---|
| Bangkok 2017 | 5 | 5 | 0 | 0 | 69 | 10 | +59 | 1st |
| Philippines 2019 | 5 | 3 | 0 | 2 | 37 | 37 | +0 | 2nd |
| Totals | 10 | 8 | 0 | 2 | 106 | 47 | +59 | |

=== Southeast Asian Floorball Championships ===
| Tournament | GP | W | D | L | GF | GA | +/- |
|---|---|---|---|---|---|---|---|
| Singapore 2014 | Did not participate | | | | | | |
| Totals | 0 | 0 | 0 | 0 | 0 | 0 | 0 |

=== Southeast Asian Games ===
| Tournament | GP | W | D | L | GF | GA | +/- | Place |
|---|---|---|---|---|---|---|---|---|
| Singapore 2015 | 4 | 2 | 0 | 2 | 19 | 17 | +2 | 2nd |
| Philippines 2019 | 5 | 4 | 1 | 0 | 55 | 27 | +28 | 1st |
| Totals | 9 | 6 | 1 | 2 | 74 | 44 | +30 | |
