= ITE College Central =

- 中区工艺教育学院 (Chinese); Institut Pendidikan Teknikal Kolej Pusat (Malay)

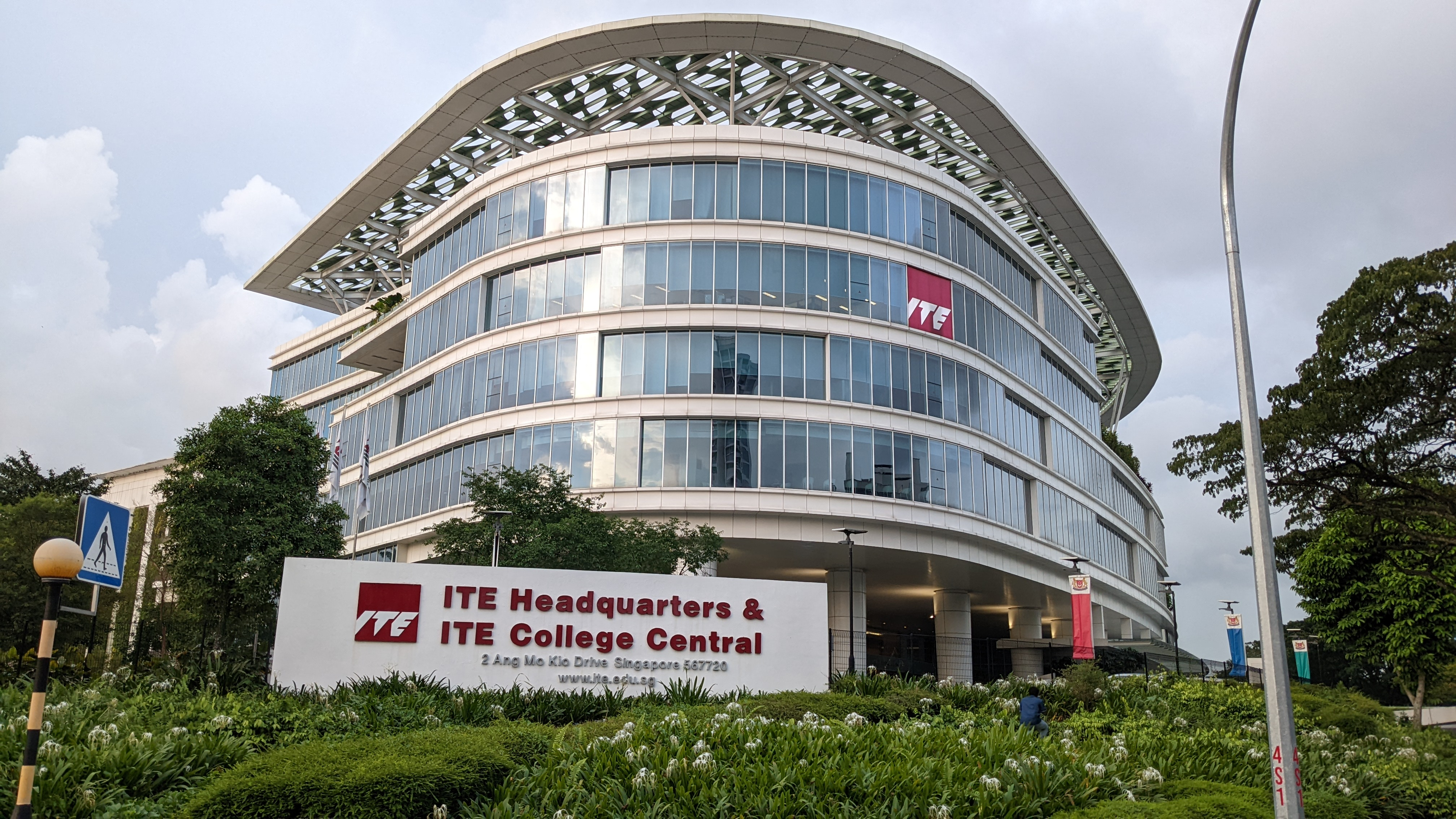
- Front facade of the campus

Location
- 2 Ang Mo Kio Drive, Singapore; Ang Mo Kio; Singapore; 1.3775°N 103.8564°E

Information
- Type: Public; Government
- Motto: Creative Learners, Innovative Workforce.
- Established: 2 January 2013; 13 years ago
- School board: Institute of Technical Education
- Principal: Seng Chin Chye
- Campus size: 10.6 hectares (26 acres)
- Website: Official website
- ITE College Central

Agency overview
- Jurisdiction: Government of Singapore
- Parent agency: Ministry of Education

ITE College Central (ITECC) is a post-secondary education institution and statutory board under the purview of the Ministry of Education in Singapore.

It is one of the Institute of Technical Education's three colleges under the "One ITE System, Four Colleges" Governance and Education Model. The college also houses the headquarters of the Institute of Technical Education.

== Campus ==
Covering a land area of 10.61 hectares with a total gross floor area of 192,820m^{2}, the campus opened to its first cohort of students in January 2013. The campus was officially opened on 8 November that year by then-Prime Minister Lee Hsien Loong.

The Tay Eng Soon Convention Centre was named after the late-Tay Eng Soon to commemorate his ministerial service in the Ministry of Education (MOE), who spearheaded the development of polytechnics and institutes for technical training in Singapore.

Since 2013, the annual National Day Rally was held at the Tay Eng Soon Convention Centre, replacing its previous permanent location of University Culture Centre which held for 12 consecutive years from 2001 to 2012. The only exceptions are in 2020 and 2021; 2020 was cancelled due to the COVID-19 pandemic, while 2021 was held at the Mediacorp campus at one-north instead.

== Academic schools and courses ==
ITE College Central has four schools; School of Business & Services, School of Design & Media, School of Electronics & Info-Communications Technology and School of Engineering, running a total of 51 courses.

== Incidents ==
In 2018, lecturer Low Hwee Geok was killed inside the school's carpark by her ex-husband Seet Cher Hng, a retiree with a gambling addiction. Seet did so owing to the aftermath of the divorce seven years prior to the incident and the infidelity against Low. Seet survived from the wounds during the attack and was subsequently arrested in a hospital. On 22 September 2021, Seet was charged with one count of murder following three years of court trial and was sentence to life imprisonment.

== Notable alumni ==
- Romeo Tan, MediaCorp actor
