= Philippines men's national floorball team =

- Founded: 2014
- Coach: (Philippines) Noél Alm Johansson
- Captain: Lucas Enaje
- IFF Ranking: 12th (2024)
- First game: 0–11, vs. Singapore (Singapore, December 18, 2014)
- Largest win: 22–1, vs. Solomon Islands (Wellington, New Zealand, January 12, 2026)
- Largest defeat: 0–18, vs. Switzerland (Chengdu, China, August 11, 2025)
- All-time top scorer: (Philippines) Melvin Alm Mendoza (53)
Home colors	Away colors

The Philippines men's national floorball team is the national floorball team of the Philippines and is organized by the Philippine Floorball Association.

The Philippines made their debut at the World Championship in 2020. Their best result came at the 2024 tournament, where they became the first Asian team to reach the round of 16 and finished in 11th place.

The Philippines are ranked 12th in the IFF ranking, following their 11th and 15th-place finishes at the World Championships in 2024 and 2022.

== History ==
The men's national team made their debut at the 2014 Southeast Asian Floorball Championships which was hosted in Singapore. The Philippines lost all its four games at its first tournament against the national teams of Indonesia, Malaysia and Singapore.

The Philippines participated in the inaugural 2017 Asia Oceania Floorball Confederation Tournament in Bangkok with no prior victory in an international floorball match. Their 4–3 win over China on July 1, 2017 in the continental tournament became their first victory in an international floorball match. They planned to enter the qualifiers of the 2018 World Floorball Championships, but did not compete in the end.

The 2019 Asia Oceania Floorball Confederation Tournament was hosted at home in Biñan with the Philippines recruiting Filipinos with links to Sweden in a bid to improve their performance. They finished bronze by beating South Korea in the third place play off.

They entered the Asia-Oceania qualifiers for the 2020 World Floorball Championship but withdrew amidst concerns over the COVID-19 pandemic. However, they were given a wildcard berth for the world championship following the withdrawal of Australia and Japan allowing them to participate in the tournament for the very first time. They failed to progress to the first playoff round, losing to Estonia and Canada but managed to secure a win against Singapore. The Philippines won against the United States to advance to the 13th place playoff. They lost to Thailand in penalties settling for 14th place.

The Philippines qualified for the 2022 World Floorball Championship. Unlike the previous edition, they earned a berth through participating in the qualifiers.

They would reach their first ever Southeast Asian Games final in the 2023 edition in Cambodia after sweeping all four games in the group stage against the host, Singapore and Thailand. They lost to Thailand in the final to settle for silver which is also their first podium finish in the regional games.

The Philippines would qualify for the 2024 World Floorball Championship after finishing as finalists in the Asia Oceania qualifiers hosted at home in Pasig. At the expense of Thailand they finished as champions of the qualification tournament.

At the 2024 World Championship, the Philippines qualified for the 2025 World Games in Chengdu, China after it emerged as the sole Asia-Oceania team to advance to the playoff. At the World Games they suffered lopsided defeats in the group stage before winning 14–0 against the host in the seventh place playoff.

== Fixtures and results ==
7 August 2025; 9:00 UTC+8	Latvia	2–12 (2–1, 4–0, 6–1)	Philippines	Xindu Xiangcheng Sports Centre, Chengdu

Game reference
Referees: Glenn Boström; Håkan Söderman

2025 World Games

9 August 2025; 11:45 UTC+8	Philippines	1–11 (0–2, 1–5, 0–4)	Sweden	Xindu Xiangcheng Sports Centre, Chengdu

Game reference

2025 World Games

10 August 2025; 15:00 UTC+8	Switzerland	18–0	Philippines	Xindu Xiangcheng Sports Centre, Chengdu

2025 World Games

12 August 2025; 10:30 UTC+8	Philippines	14–0	China	Xindu Xiangcheng Sports Centre, Chengdu

2025 World Games

== Players ==
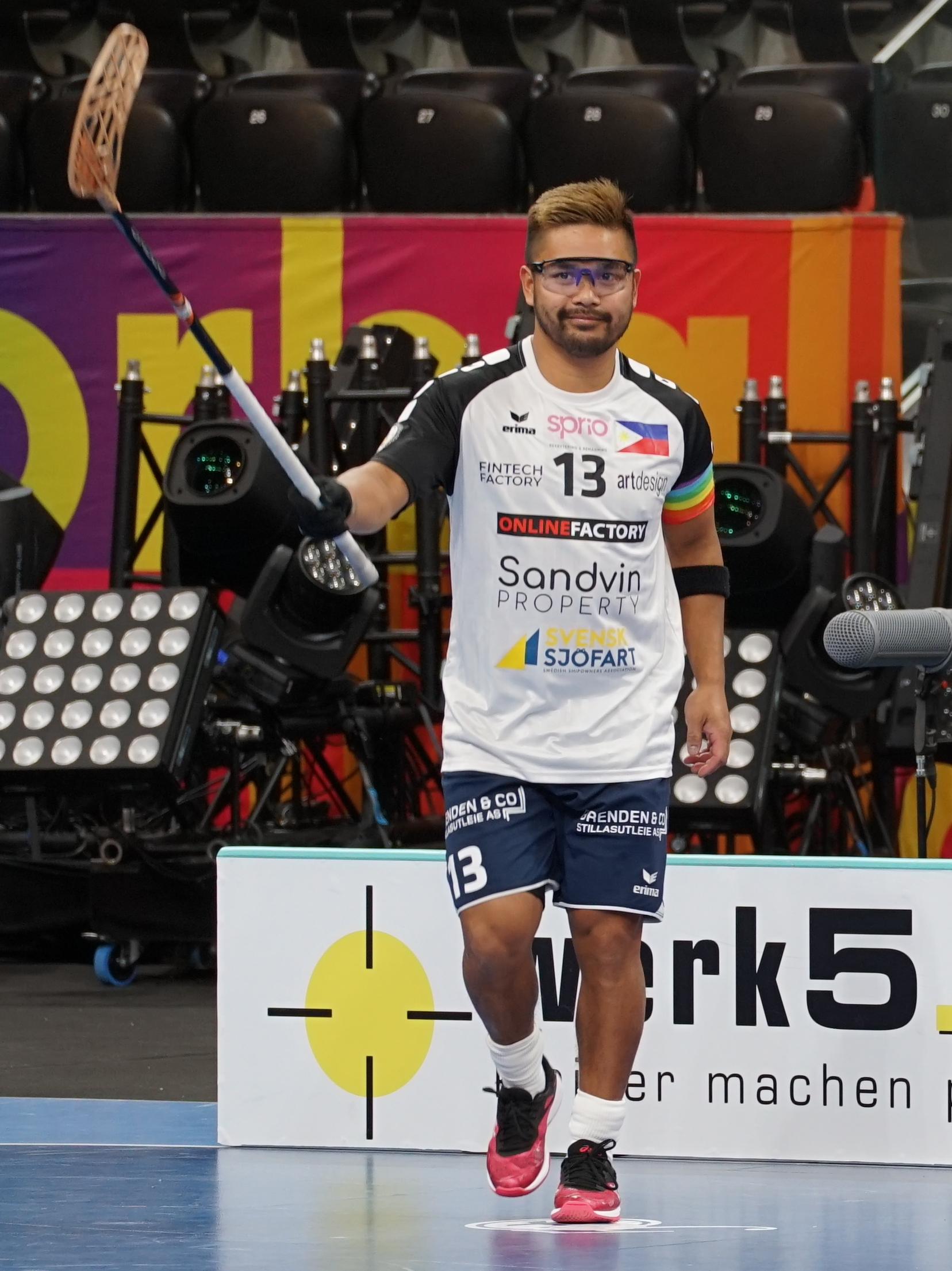
Lucas Oijvall Perez, the captain of the national team.

=== Current squad ===
The following is the roster for the 2025 World Games

Goalkeepers
Number	Player name
29	Patrik Nessbo
88	Victor Lindberg
Defensemen
Number	Player name
4	Ludvig Porral
11	Simon Laraño
13	Lucas Öijvall Perez
22	Noah Laraño
77	Simon Andersson
Forwards
Number	Player name
9	Lucas Werelius
10	Reymon Ponce
12	John De la Peña
24	Melvin Mendoza
25	Richard Ponce
40	Kim Franz
66	Mattiece Cortez Myllyperkiö

=== 2020 roster ===
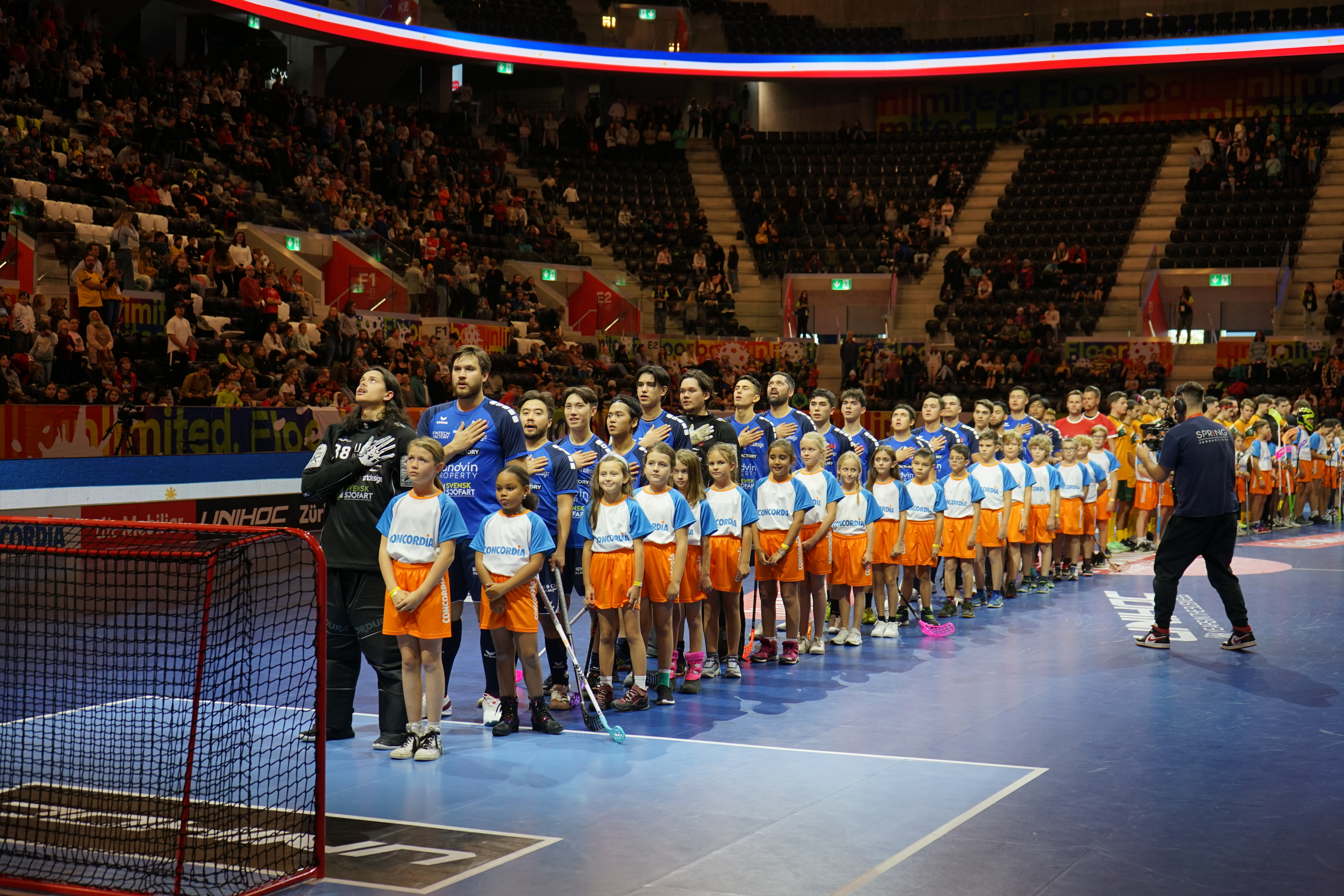
The national team at the 2022 World Championships in Switzerland

Previous squads of the Philippines
Tournament	Players	Ref.
2020 World Championships	Patrik Nessbo; Kristofer Jandelius Del Valle; Ludvig Porral; Lucas Öijvall Perez; Alexander Springfeldt De Chavez; Christofer Bernardo Holland; Ryan Hallden Cater; Fredrik Dahmen Cantos; Simon Andersson; Rhodell Esguerra; Patrik Schoultze; Lucas Werelius; Christian Castrillo Schoultze; Fredrik Jeppsson Escabel; Melvin Mendoza; Kim Varga Franz; Mattiece Cortez Myllyperkio; Russel Vincent Alido	
2024 World Championships	Patrik Nessbo; Victor Lindberg; Ludvig Porral; Simon Laraño; Lucas Öijvall Perez; Christian Schoultze Castrillo; Noah Laraño; Simon Andersson; Rhodell Esguerra; Patrik Schoultze Castrillo; Lucas Werelius; Reymon Sellgren Ponce; John Callenryd De la Peña; Fredrik Jeppsson Escabel; Melvin Mendoza; Richard Sellgren Ponce; Michael Hedblom; Kim Varga Franz; Mattiece Cortez Myllyperkiö; Mathew Alejandro	

== Current coaching staff ==
Position	Name	Ref.
Team Manager	Kennet Andersson	
Head coach	Noel Alm Johansson	
Coach	Fredrik Nybäck; Daniel Skantze	
Physiotherapist	Daniel Von Knorring	
Equipment manager	Nora Amundsson	
Team official	Jayr Beterbo	

== Records ==
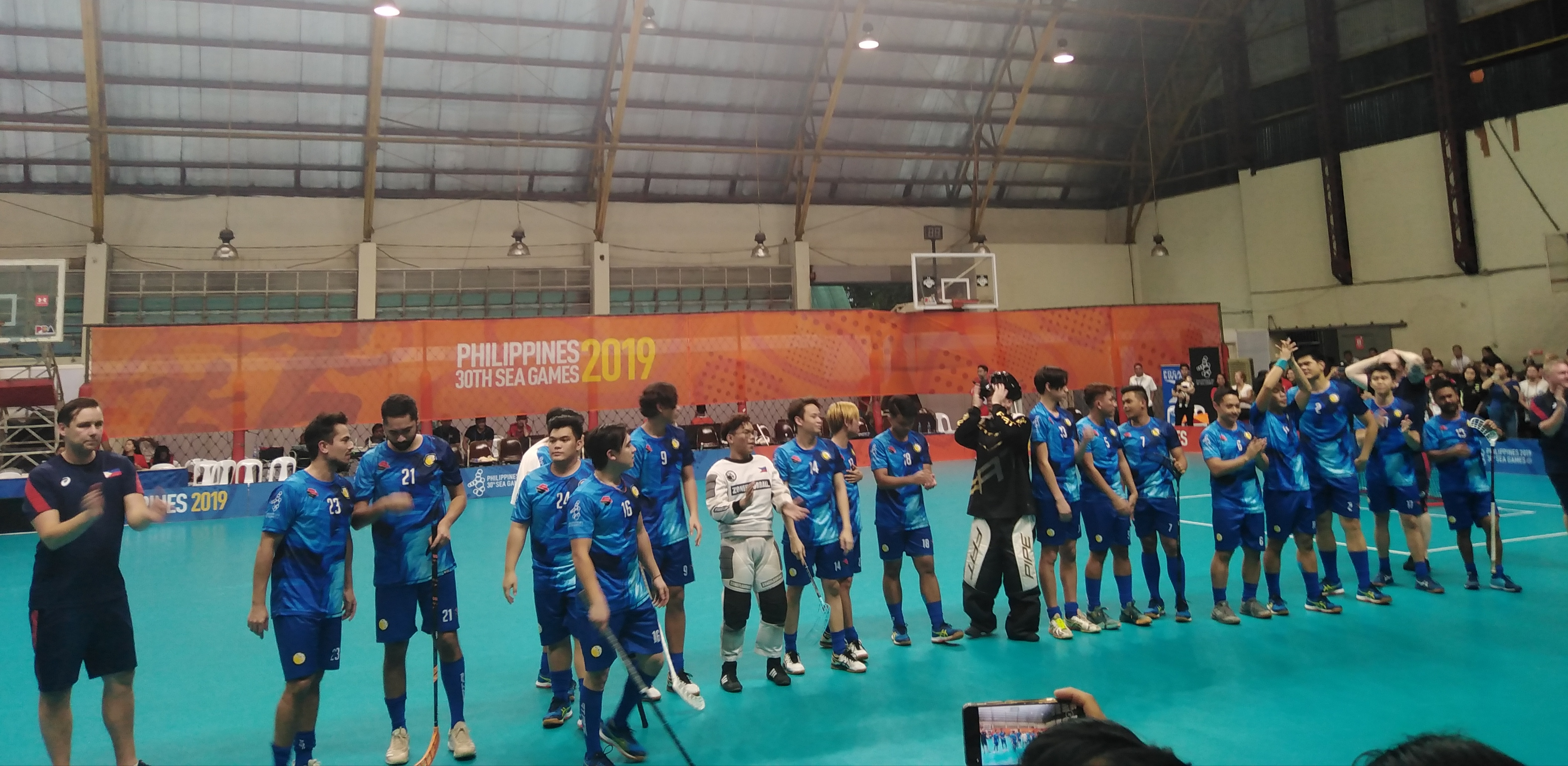
The Philippines national team at the 2019 SEA Games.

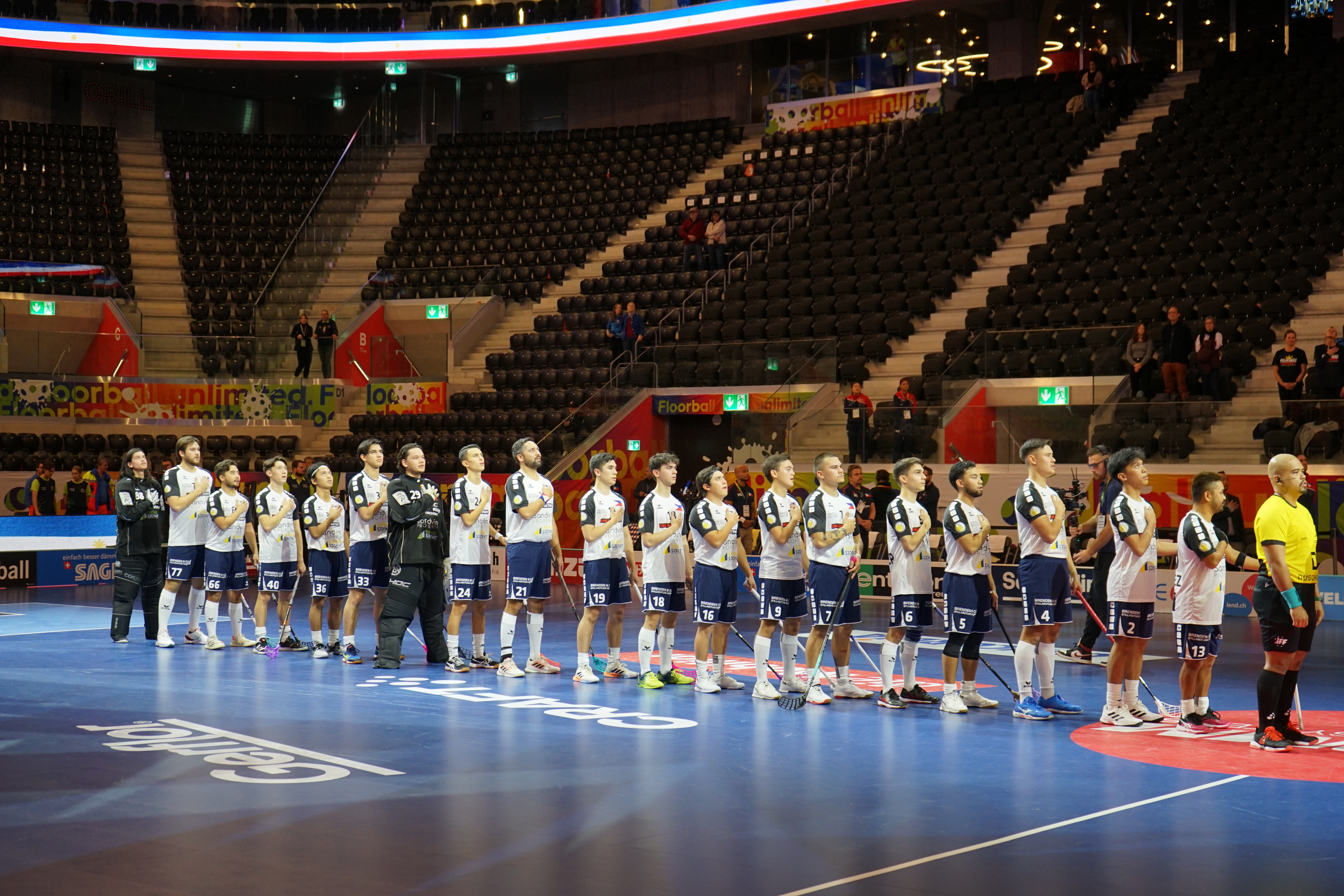
The Philippines national team at the 2022 Men's World Floorball Championships.

=== World Championships ===
Champions Runners up Third place Fourth place

Men's World Floorball Championship
Year	Round	Position	Pld	W	D	L	GF	GA	+/-
(Finland) 2020	Group Stage	14th Place	5	2	0	3	41	44	–3
(Switzerland) 2022	Group Stage	15th Place	5	1	0	4	19	44	–25
(Sweden) 2024	Group Stage	11th Place	6	3	0	3	29	43	–14
Total	0 Titles	11th Place	16	6	0	10	88	131	–42

=== World Games ===
Champions Runners up Third place Fourth place

World Games
Year	Round	Position	Pld	W	D	L	GF	GA	+/-
(China) 2025	Group stage	7th place	4	1	0	3	17	41	−24
Total	0 Titles	—	4	1	0	3	17	41	-24

=== Asia-Oceania Floorball Cup ===
Champions Runners up Third place Fourth place

Asia-Oceania Floorball Cup
Year	Round	Position	Pld	W	D	L	GF	GA	+/-
(Thailand) 2017	Group Stage	8th Place	6	2	0	4	20	37	-27
(Philippines) 2019	Semi Finals	Third Place	6	4	0	2	36	40	-4
Total	0 Titles	Third Place	12	6	0	6	56	77	-21

=== Southeast Asian Floorball Championships ===
Champions Runners up Third place Fourth place

Southeast Asian Floorball Championships
Year	Round	Position	Pld	W	D	L	GF	GA	+/-
(Singapore) 2014	Group Stage	4th Place	4	0	0	4	4	32	-28
Total	0 Titles	Fourth Place	4	0	0	4	4	32	-28

=== SEA Games ===
Champions Runners up Third place Fourth place

SEA Games
Year	Round	Position	Pld	W	D	L	GF	GA	+/-
(Singapore) 2015	Group Stage	4th Place	4	0	0	4	7	49	-42
(Philippines) 2019	Group Stage	4th Place	5	2	0	3	23	37	-14
(Cambodia) 2023	Final	2nd Place	5	4	0	1	31	14	+17
Total	0 Titles	2nd Place	14	6	0	8	61	100	-39

== Head coaches ==
- (Sweden) Peter Eriksson (–2019)
- (Philippines) Noel Alm Johansson (2019–)
