= Thailand women's national floorball team =

- Founded: 2015
- IFF Ranking: 17th (2025)
- Championships: 3 World Championships (2017, 2019, 2021)

Thailand women's national floorball team represents Thailand in international competitions of women's floorball. The team made their debut at the Women's World Floorball Championships in 2017. The team won silver medals at the Southeast Asian Games in 2015 and 2019.

== Results ==
=== Women's World Championships ===
Year	Host country	Rank
2017	Slovakia	13th place
2019	Switzerland	15th place
2021	Sweden	15th place
2025	Czech Republic	Withdrew from qualification

=== Southeast Asian Games ===
Year	Host country	Rank
2015	Singapore	2nd place
2019	Philippines	2nd place

=== Asia-Oceania Floorball Cup ===
Year	Host country	Rank
2018	Singapore	2nd place
2022	Singapore	4th place

=== World Games ===
Floorball at the 2025 World Games – Women's tournament

2-21 SWE

1-19 SUI

0-14 SVK

0-0 CAN

=== Southeast Asian Floorball Championships ===
Southeast Asian Floorball Championships - Did Not Compete

== Previous Matches ==
Date Tournament Match Score

=== 2025 ===
Floorball at the 2025 World Games – Women's tournament

=== 2022 ===
28/05/2022 Women´s AOFC Cup 2022 Team flag of THA W THA W - MAS W Team flag of MAS W 3 - 2

27/05/2022 Women´s AOFC Cup 2022 Team flag of THA W THA W - INA W Team flag of INA W 11 - 0

26/05/2022 Women´s AOFC Cup 2022 Team flag of THA W THA W - PHI W Team flag of PHI W 2 - 8

25/05/2022 Women´s AOFC Cup 2022 Team flag of SGP W SGP W - THA W Team flag of THA W 6 - 2

24/05/2022 Women´s AOFC Cup 2022 Team flag of SGP WU19 SGP WU19 - THA W Team flag of THA W 1 - 2

23/05/2022 Women´s AOFC Cup 2022 Team flag of MAS W MAS W - THA W Team flag of THA W 2 - 3

=== 2021 ===
02/12/2021 Women´s World Championships Team flag of ITA W ITA W - THA W Team flag of THA W 5 - 10

01/12/2021 Women´s World Championships Team flag of THA W THA W - SGP W Team flag of SGP W 1 - 2 ot.

30/11/2021 Women´s World Championships Team flag of THA W THA W - USA W Team flag of USA W 6 - 8

29/11/2021 Women´s World Championships Team flag of DEN W DEN W - THA W Team flag of THA W 9 - 1

28/11/2021 Women´s World Championships Team flag of ITA W ITA W - THA W Team flag of THA W 2 - 5

=== 2019 ===
12/12/2019 Women´s World Championships Team flag of THA W THA W - USA W Team flag of USA W 10 - 6

11/12/2019 Women´s World Championships Team flag of THA W THA W - JPN W Team flag of JPN W 3 - 6

10/12/2019 Women´s World Championships Team flag of USA W USA W - THA W Team flag of THA W 5 - 10

09/12/2019 Women´s World Championships Team flag of AUS W AUS W - THA W Team flag of THA W 4 - 1

08/12/2019 Women´s World Championships Team flag of THA W THA W - SGP W Team flag of SGP W 1 - 3

01/12/2019 Women´s SEA Games 2019 Team flag of SGP W SGP W - THA W Team flag of THA W 3 - 2

28/11/2019 Women´s SEA Games 2019 Team flag of THA W THA W - INA W Team flag of INA W 7 - 0

27/11/2019 Women´s SEA Games 2019 Team flag of SGP W SGP W - THA W Team flag of THA W 4 - 1

26/11/2019 Women´s SEA Games 2019 Team flag of THA W THA W - PHI W Team flag of PHI W 6 - 3

25/11/2019 Women´s SEA Games 2019 Team flag of MAS W MAS W - THA W Team flag of THA W 2 - 8

01/02/2019 Women´s World Championships Qualifications AOFC Team flag of THA W THA W - SGP W Team flag of SGP W 5 - 4

31/01/2019 Women´s World Championships Qualifications AOFC Team flag of THA W THA W - MAS W Team flag of MAS W 2 - 1 ot.

30/01/2019 Women´s World Championships Qualifications AOFC Team flag of THA W THA W - PHI W Team flag of PHI W 11 - 0

28/01/2019 Women´s World Championships Qualifications AOFC Team flag of THA W THA W - AUS W Team flag of AUS W 2 - 8

27/01/2019 Women´s World Championships Qualifications AOFC Team flag of NZL W NZL W - THA W Team flag of THA W 1 - 6

=== 2018 ===
23/06/2018 Women´s AOFC Cup 2018 Team flag of THA W THA W - SGP W Team flag of SGP W 1 - 4

22/06/2018 Women´s AOFC Cup 2018 Team flag of JPN W JPN W - THA W Team flag of THA W 4 - 9

21/06/2018 Women´s AOFC Cup 2018 Team flag of PHI W PHI W - THA W Team flag of THA W 2 - 8

20/06/2018 Women´s AOFC Cup 2018 Team flag of THA W THA W - SGP W Team flag of SGP W 1 - 2

19/06/2018 Women´s AOFC Cup 2018 Team flag of INA W INA W - THA W Team flag of THA W 0 - 20

18/06/2018 Women´s AOFC Cup 2018 Team flag of THA W THA W - IND W Team flag of IND W 15 - 1

=== 2017 ===
06/12/2017 Women´s World Championships Team flag of JPN W JPN W - THA W Team flag of THA W 2 - 4

05/12/2017 Women´s World Championships Team flag of SGP W SGP W - THA W Team flag of THA W 5 - 6

04/12/2017 Women´s World Championships Team flag of THA W THA W - JPN W Team flag of JPN W 2 - 5

03/12/2017 Women´s World Championships Team flag of USA W USA W - THA W Team flag of THA W 9 - 7

01/12/2017 Women´s World Championships Team flag of DEN W DEN W - THA W Team flag of THA W 11 - 2

05/02/2017 Women´s World Floorball Championships Qualifications AOFC Team flag of SGP W SGP W - THA W Team flag of THA W 6 - 3

04/02/2017 Women´s World Floorball Championships Qualifications AOFC Team flag of JPN W JPN W - THA W Team flag of THA W 3 - 2 ot.

03/02/2017 Women´s World Floorball Championships Qualifications AOFC Team flag of THA W THA W - KOR W Team flag of KOR W 5 - 4

02/02/2017 Women´s World Floorball Championships Qualifications AOFC Team flag of CHN W CHN W - THA W Team flag of THA W 2 - 21

01/02/2017 Women´s World Floorball Championships Qualifications AOFC Team flag of THA W THA W - NZL W Team flag of NZL W 3 - 2

31/01/2017 Women´s World Floorball Championships Qualifications AOFC Team flag of THA W THA W - AUS W Team flag of AUS W 1 - 6

=== 2015 ===
14/06/2015 Women´s SEA Games 2015 Team flag of SGP W SGP W - THA W Team flag of THA W 4 - 3 ps.

13/06/2015 Women´s SEA Games 2015 Team flag of THA W THA W - MAS W Team flag of MAS W 6 - 2

12/06/2015 Women´s SEA Games 2015 Team flag of SGP W SGP W - THA W Team flag of THA W 2 - 1
