= Singapore men's national floorball team =

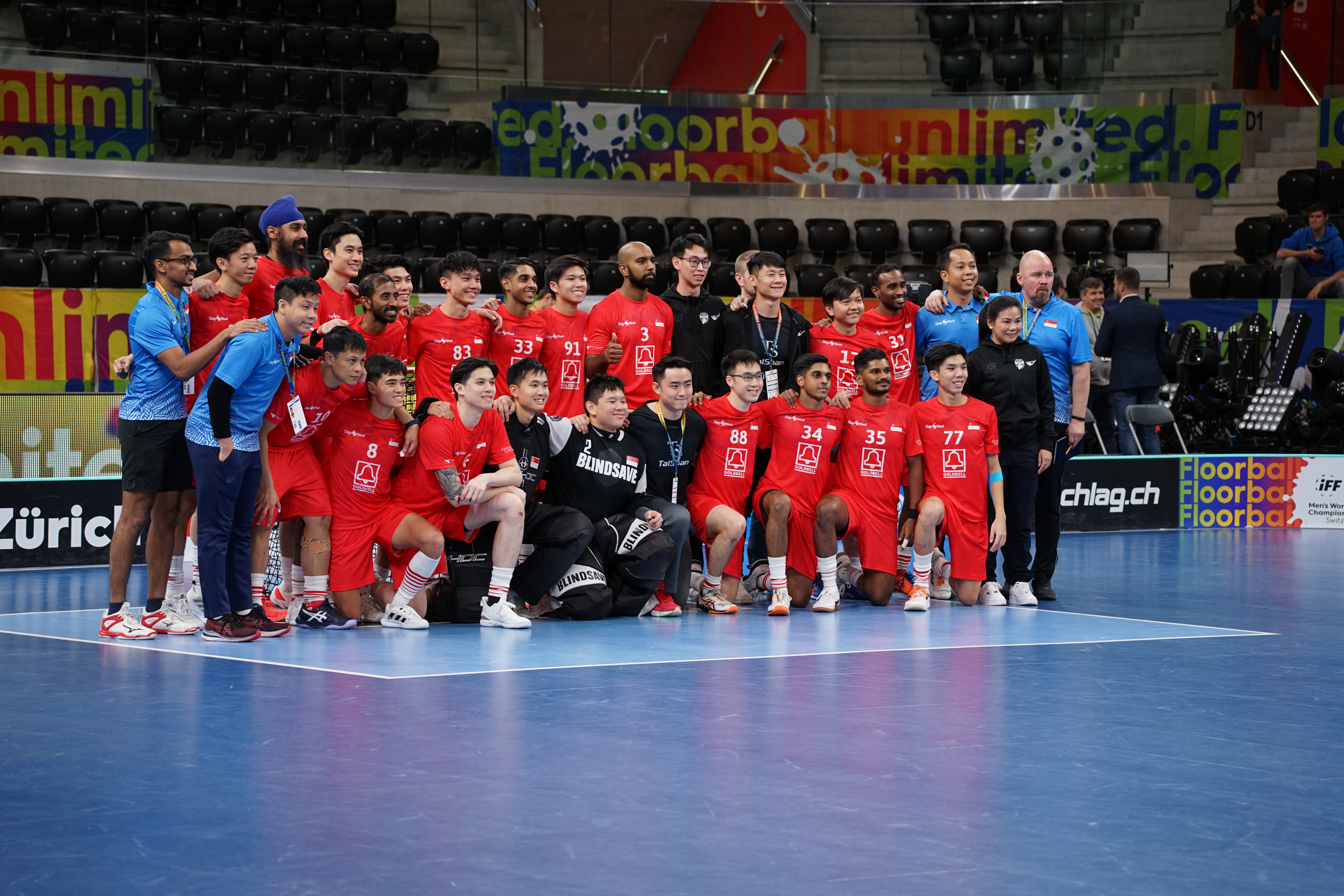
- The National Team at the World Championship 2022 in Switzerland
- Founded: 1996
- Coach: (Singapore) Sonia Chia Poh Ching
- Captain: (Singapore) R Suria
- IFF Ranking: 17th (2024)
- Championships: Asia-Oceania Floorball Cup: 1st (2019); SEA Games: 1st (2015); Southeast Asian Floorball Championships: 1st (2014)

The Singapore men's national floorball team is the national floorball team of Singapore and is organized by the Singapore Floorball Association.

First organized in 1996, the national team is the first Asian nation to participate at the World Floorball Championships having participated in the inaugural edition of the tournament which was held in Sweden in 1996. They are the winner of 2019 Asia-Oceania Floorball Cup and of men's floorball tournament in 2015 Southeast Asian Floorball Championships.

== Records ==
=== World Floorball Championships ===
Tournament	GP	W	D	L	GF	GA	+/-	Place
1996 Sweden	6	0	0	6	4	99	-95	12th
1998–2008	Did not participate							
2010 Finland	5	0	0	5	12	106	-94	16th
2012 Switzerland	5	0	0	5	10	77	-67	16th
2014 Sweden	Did not qualify							
2016 Latvia	5	1	0	4	18	38	-20	16th
2018 Czech Republic	5	1	1	3	20	35	-15	16th
2024 Sweden	Did not qualify							
Total	26	2	1	23	64	355	-291	

=== Asia-Oceania Floorball Cup ===
Tournament	GP	W	D	L	GF	GA	+/-	Place
Bangkok 2017	5	4	0	1	58	9	+49	2nd
Biñan 2019	5	5	0	0	73	7	+66	1st
Total	10	9	0	1	131	16	+115	

=== SEA Games ===
Tournament	GP	W	D	L	GF	GA	+/-	Place
Singapore 2015	3	3	0	0	36	6	+30	1st
Philippines 2019	5	3	1	0	27	12	+15	2nd
Total	8	6	1	0	63	18	+45	

=== Southeast Asian Floorball Championships ===
Tournament	GP	W	D	L	GF	GA	+/-	Place
Singapore 2014	4	4	0	0	34	5	+29	1st
Total	4	4	0	0	34	5	+29	
