= Malaysia women's national floorball team =

Malaysia women's national floorball team is the national team of Malaysia. At the 2003 Floorball Women's World Championship in Germany, the team finished tenth in the B-Division. At the 2005 Floorball Women's World Championship in Singapore, the team finished ninth in the B-Division.
