= Singapore women's national floorball team =

- IFF Ranking: 13th (2025)

Singapore women's national floorball team is the national team of Singapore. At the 1999 Floorball Women's World Championship in Borlänge, Sweden, the team finished fifth in the B-Division. At the 2001 Floorball Women's World Championship in Riga, Latvia, the team finished third in the B-Division. At the 2003 Floorball Women's World Championship in Germany, the team finished fifth in the B-Division. At the 2005 Floorball Women's World Championship in Singapore, the team finished third in the B-Division. At the 2007 Floorball Women's World Championship in Frederikshavn, Denmark, the team finished tenth in the A-Division and were relegated to the B-Division.

== Results ==
=== World Games ===
- Floorball at the 2025 World Games – Women's tournament
