= Lise Hernandez Girouard =

Mexican-Canadian indoor skydiving competitor

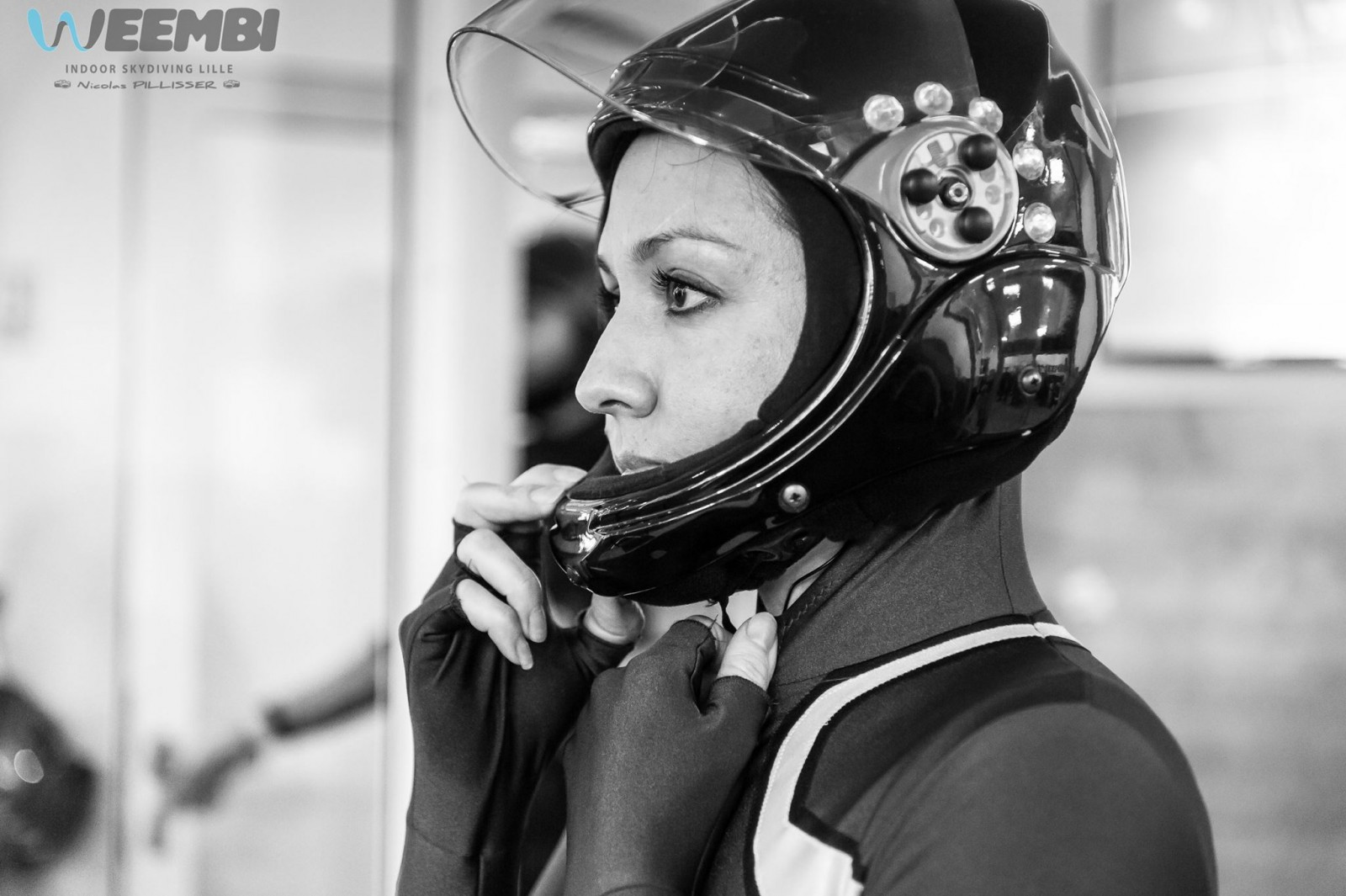
- Hernandez Girouard in 2014

Personal information
- Nationality: Canada Mexico
- Born: January 29, 1975 (age 51) Mexico City, Mexico
- Years active: 1995–present

Sport
- Sport: Indoor skydiving
- Event: Freestyle

Lise Hernandez Girouard (born January 29, 1975) is a Mexican-Canadian indoor skydiving competitor. She is known for her role in introducing music into indoor freestyle skydiving competitions, a format she termed "indoor skydancing".

== Early life and education ==
Born in Mexico City to a Canadian mother and Mexican father, Hernandez Girouard began formal figure skating training in 1984 at Skatorama in Lomas Verdes.

After moving to Ciudad Victoria in 1992, she later relocated to Nuevo León to study communication sciences at the Universidad de Monterrey. She continued her figure skating training during this time and competed at the national level.

== Skydiving career ==
Hernandez Girouard began skydiving in 1995 while attending university. She initially focused on formation skydiving and was part of the 102-person Canadian national record set on July 13, 2012, in Farnham, Quebec. In 1997, she traveled to Florida for skydiving training and experienced a vertical wind tunnel for the first time. She later transitioned to freestyle skydiving.

== Indoor skydiving and musical integration ==
In 2013, Hernandez Girouard relocated to France. She subsequently shifted her athletic focus to indoor skydiving and secured a "passeport talent profession artistique et culturelle" visa from the French government, enabling her to remain in the country to develop her artistic project. To address the challenge of hearing music inside a wind tunnel, which operates at approximately 100 decibels, she developed a technical setup using custom-moulded ear seals, integrated monitors, earmuffs, and a wireless transmission system that allowed both the athlete and the audience to hear the music in real time. She termed this musical format "indoor skydancing" as a tribute to outdoor freestyle pioneer Deanna Kent, who was known as "Skydancer".

=== Performances and judging ===
On March 23, 2014, Hernandez Girouard competed in the Neo-Freestyle category at the 2nd Canadian Indoor Skydiving Championships at SkyVenture Montréal. She performed three routines to music using a wireless audio system that allowed her, the judges and the audience to hear the music during the competition. The performance was documented in the June–August 2014 edition of CanPara magazine, published by the Canadian Sport Parachuting Association.

In November 2014, Hernandez Girouard competed at the first World Cup of Indoor Skydiving in Austin, Texas, where she again performed her freestyle routines to music, although the competition rules did not yet include music. In the official event report, FAI Controller Gillian Rayner described this as the first use of musical accompaniment in the competition's artistic freestyle event.

The FAI subsequently included music as an optional element in indoor freestyle routines. However, no competitors used music at the first World Indoor Skydiving Championships in Prague in October 2015.

In January 2016, Hernandez Girouard was invited to help organize the freestyle event at the Wind Games in Empuriabrava, Spain. Working with event organizer Anne Maxwell, she provided audio equipment, wrote competition rules and developed judging criteria for a new three-round format that included low-speed flight, high-speed flight and a compulsory musical round. She also served on the judging panel alongside freeflyer Adam Mattacola and dance instructor Dolo Yglesias. The musical performances received widespread attention through online videos and media coverage.

In a 2018 account of the development of international indoor skydiving competitions, Gillian Rayner, then president of the International Parachuting Commission, credited Hernandez Girouard's use of music at the 2014 World Cup with helping open the way for music in later Solo Freestyle and Dynamic routines.

== See also ==
- Indoor freestyle skydiving
- Wind Games
- Bodyflight
