= Indoor freestyle skydiving =

Competitive discipline of indoor skydiving

Indoor Freestyle Skydiving
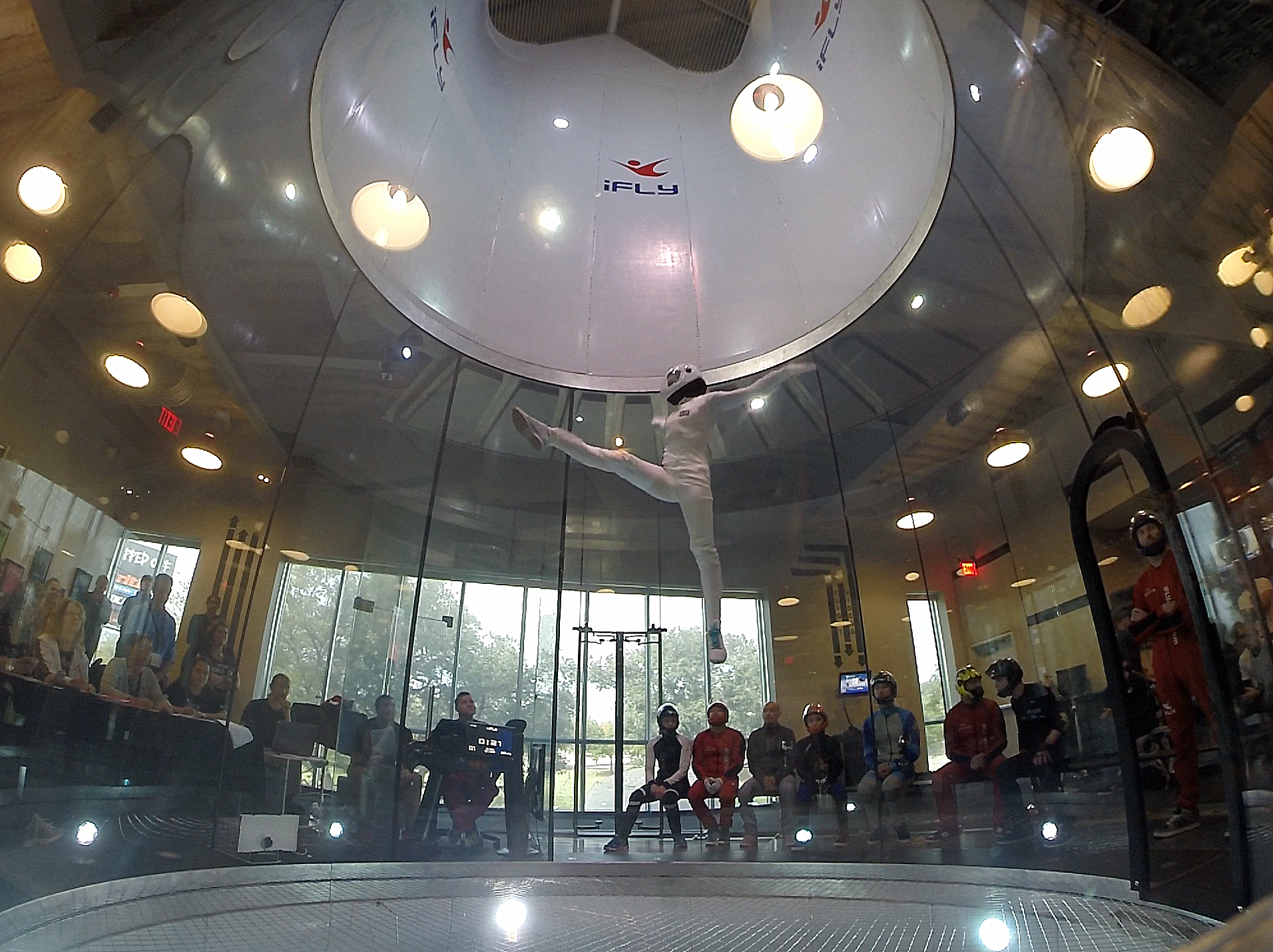
- Competitor at the 1st FAI Indoor Skydiving World Cup (2014)
- Highest governing body: International Skydiving Commission (ISC)
- First played: 2014 (First FAI World Cup)

Characteristics
- Type: Air sport, Artistic
- Equipment: Vertical wind tunnel, flight suit

Indoor freestyle skydiving (also known as artistic indoor skydiving) is a competitive discipline performed by a solo flyer inside a vertical wind tunnel. Competitors perform compulsory and free routines. Under FAI rules, a free routine may be choreographed to music, although music is optional. Musical freestyle routines are one context in which the artistic practice known as indoor skydancing has been presented.

== History ==
Indoor freestyle originated from the "Neo-Freestyle" movement. Before the International Skydiving Commission (ISC) officially recognized indoor skydiving in 2014, the discipline existed as a solo format. Unlike outdoor freestyle, which requires a camera flyer to record the performance for judging, indoor freestyle allows judges to view the routine live through the glass walls of the tunnel.

=== Musical Integration ===
At the first World Cup of Indoor Skydiving in Austin, Texas, in November 2014, Hernandez Girouard performed her freestyle routines to music. In the official event report, FAI Controller Gillian Rayner described it as the first time the competition's artistic freestyle event used musical accompaniment.

In 2015, the FAI officially included in their rules the use of music as optional; however, no freestyle participant performed their routines to music during the 1st World Indoor Skydiving Championships in Prague.

In 2016, the WindGames was the first competition to include music as a mandatory element inside the freestyle discipline. This competition featured athletes such as Maja Kuczyńska and Leonid Volkov, whose performances received significant social media attention and popularized the "Skydancing" format.

=== Timeline ===
Key Milestones
Date	Event	Key Figures	Significance
1999	First commercial SkyVenture Tunnel	SkyVenture	Advanced technology provided smoother airflow necessary for complex artistic maneuvers.
2014 (Mar)	Music proof of concept	Lise Hernandez Girouard	First public performance of indoor freestyle synchronized with music.
2014 (Nov)	1st FAI Indoor World Cup	FAI	Indoor Skydiving officially adopted by the ISC.
2015	1st FAI World Championships	FAI	Established regular international competition series.
2016 (Jan)	Wind Games Musical Round	Windoor & Lise H.G	First major competition requiring a musical round and goes viral.
2017 (Jan)	Guinness World Record	Amy Watson (Australia)	Amy Watson (age 11) sets a record: 44 horizontal 360-degree spins in one minute.
2017	Wind Tunnel Theatrical Shows	Ksenia Safi	"The Space Theater" (Moscow) launched as a formal production.
2024	Dance Pairs Competition	Russian Sports Federation	Introduction of "Dance Couples" category.

== Rules and Scoring ==
Competition meets typically consist of multiple rounds split into two categories:

- Compulsory Routines: The flyer must perform a specific sequence of mandatory movements. These rounds are judged primarily on technical difficulty and execution, without music.
- Free Routine (Musical Round): The flyer performs a prepared choreography. In major competitions, this routine is performed to music. Judges evaluate artistic presentation, musicality, and showmanship in addition to technical skill.

== See also ==
- Bodyflight
- Wind Games
- Vertical wind tunnel
- Lise Hernandez Girouard
- Leonid Volkov (skydiver)
- Freestyle skydiving
- Freeflying
