= Maja Kuczyńska =

Polish freestyle skydiver (born 2000)

Personal information
- Nationality: Polish
- Born: 25 January 2000 (age 26) Warsaw, Poland
- Employer: FlySpot
- Website: redbull.com/int-en/athlete/maja-kuczynska

Sport
- Country: Poland
- Sport: Freestyle skydiving

Maja Kuczyńska (born 25 January 2000) is a Polish freestyle skydiver competing in both the indoor and outdoor skydiving disciplines.

== Biography ==
Maja Kuczyńska was born on 25 January 2000 in Warsaw, Poland. As a child, her family moved frequently from country to country within Europe. Kuczyńska participated in a variety of acrobatic activities growing up such as skiing, gymnastics, and ballet.

Kuczyńska began skydiving in 2010 when she did a tandem jump with her father in Kyiv. Six months after that, she first flew in a vertical wind tunnel at the FreeZone indoor skydiving facility in Moscow, later saying it was "the greatest experience" of her life. Kuczyńska began competitive training for indoor skydiving at the Hurricane Factory in Prague after her family relocated there. At age 12, she participated in her first indoor skydiving competition at the World Challenge in Bedford, England.

In 2015, Kuczyńska competed at the World Indoor Skydiving Championships in Prague, taking first place in the newly created category of Freestyle Junior.

In 2016, a video of Kuczyńska competing in The Wind Games to the song "Chandelier" by Sia went viral on facebook, receiving over 100 million views. Later that year, Kuczyńska became sponsored by Red Bull to become the first ever Red Bull indoor skydiving athlete.

In 2020, Kuczyńska competed against fellow Pole and Red Bull athlete Łukasz Czepiela in a "Game Of A.I.R." in which Czepiela, an aerobatic pilot, and Kuczyńska attempted to perform various maneuvers while free falling that the other could not replicate, similar to a game of S.K.A.T.E. or H.O.R.S.E.

In 2024, Kuczyńska began competing professionally in outdoor skydiving, taking third place with her skydiving partner Mairis Laiva in the World Skydiving Championships in Beaufort, North Carolina.

In 2025, Kuczyńska took first place in Freestyle Open at the World Indoor Skydiving Championships in Charleroi, Belgium.

Kuczyńska is active on a variety of social media platforms, having over 2.3 million followers across her Instagram, TikTok, and Facebook accounts.

== Achievements ==
Year	Competition	Venue	Event	Position
2015	World Indoor Skydiving Championships	Prague, Czech Republic	Freestyle Junior	
2016	The Wind Games	Empuriabrava, Spain	Freestyle Open	
2017	The Wind Games	Empuriabrava, Spain	Freestyle Open	
2017	World Indoor Skydiving Championships	Laval, Canada	Freestyle Open	
2018	The Wind Games	Empuriabrava, Spain	Freestyle Open	
2018	World Cup of Indoor Skydiving	Zallaq, Bahrain	Freestyle Open	
2021	Flyspot Polish Open	Warsaw, Poland	Freestyle Open	
2022	World Cup of Indoor Skydiving	Charleroi, Belgium	Freestyle Open	
2023	World Indoor Skydiving Championships	Liptovský Mikuláš, Slovakia	Freestyle Open	
2024	World Skydiving Championships	Beaufort, North Carolina, USA	Freestyle (Tandem)	
2025	World Indoor Skydiving Championships	Charleroi, Belgium	Freestyle Open	
2025	World Skydiving Championships	Teuge, Netherlands	Freestyle (Tandem)	

== See also ==
- Sport in Poland
- List of Polish sports players
- List of sportswomen
