= Jean Saint-Germain =

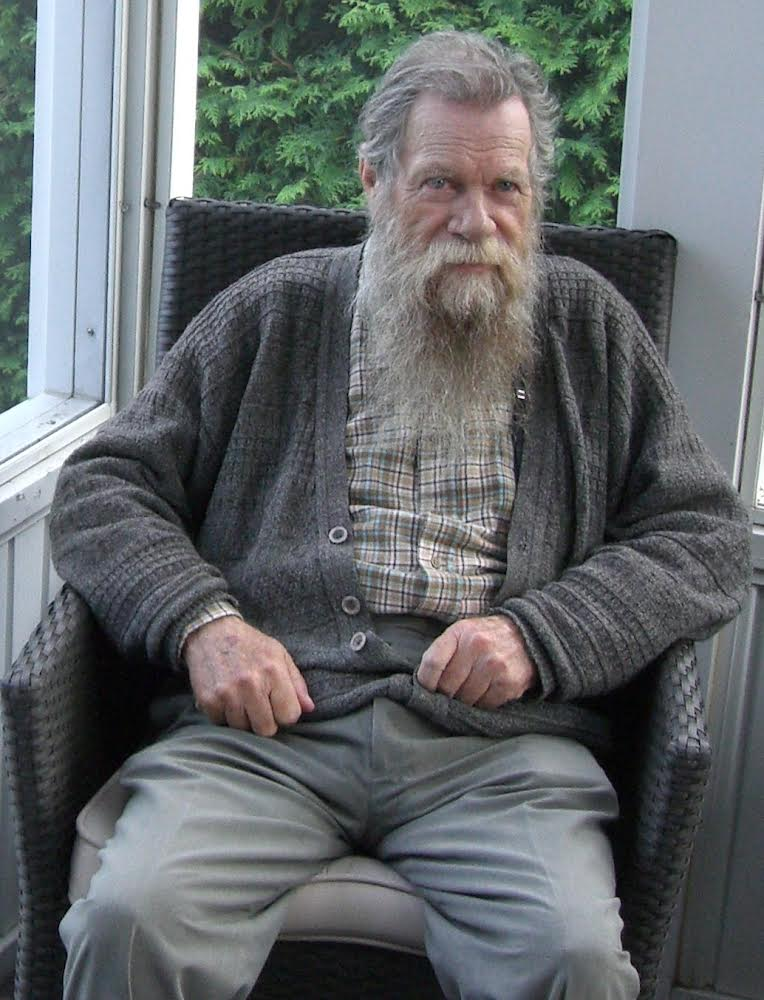
- Jean Saint-Germain
- Born: 29 March 1937; Estrie, Canada
- Died: 16 September 2016 (aged 79); Saint-Hyacinthe, Canada
- Engineering career
- Discipline: Electrical engineering, Mechanical engineering
- Projects: Airless baby bottle, Vertical wind tunnel, Robot restaurant

Jean Saint-Germain (March 29, 1937 – September 16, 2016) was a Quebec inventor from Drummondville. In 1953 at the age of 16 he invented an airless baby bottle, which the Playtex company bought for US$1,000 and sold millions of copies.

Passionate about aviation, he is also the inventor of Aerodium, a vertical wind tunnel for indoor skydiving. In 1979 Saint-Germain opened the first public wind tunnel in a silo with cushioned walls and a propeller underneath. It allowed people to soar in the air, creating an experience similar to skydiving. In 1982 he sold the franchise to a real-estate investor Marvin Kratter for US$1.5 million and consecutively was featured in the People magazine.

He recounted his passion for inventions in his autobiography published in 1979: Don't give up - There's always a way (French: Lâche pas - Y'a toujours un moyen).
