= Leonid Volkov (disambiguation) =

Leonid Volkov (born 1980) is a Russian politician.

Leonid Volkov may also refer to:

- Leonid Volkov (ice hockey) (1934–1995), Russian ice hockey player
- Leonid Volkov (skydiver) (born 1988), Russian skydiver
