= List of Singapore world champions in sports =

This is a list of Singapore world champions in sports, excluding those from youth categories and youth tournaments.

Note: Only world championships organized and/or sanctioned by the respective world's top governing sports bodies are cited.

Year	Name	Sport	Event	Championship
1985	Adelene Wee	Ten-pin bowling	Women's Masters	World Games
1990	Sheik Alauddin	Pencak silat	Men's 80-85 kg	World Pencak Silat Championship
1990	Teo Sim Hua	Xiangqi	Women	World Xiangqi Championship
1993	Azman Abdullah	Bodybuilding	Men's 80 kg	World Games
1993	Azman Abdullah	Bodybuilding	Men's 80 kg	World Amateur Bodybuilding Championship
1994	Sheik Alauddin	Pencak silat	Men's Open	World Pencak Silat Championship
1994	Kelly Chan	Windsurfing	Masters'	World Boardsailing Championship
1995	Vincent Ng	Wushu	Men's Broadsword	World Wushu Championship
2004	Calvin Lim	Sailing	Men	World Byte Championship
2006	Nicholas Paul De Cruz	Sailing	Men	World Byte Championship
2006	Elizabeth Yin	Sailing	Women	World Byte Championship
2006	Remy Ong	Ten-pin bowling	Men's All Events	WTBA World Tenpin Bowling Championship
2006	Remy Ong	Ten-pin bowling	Men's Singles	WTBA World Tenpin Bowling Championship
2008	Jasmine Yeong-Nathan	Ten-pin bowling	Women's	Bowling World Cup
2010	Justin Liu, Sherman Cheng	Sailing	Men and Mixed	420 World Championship
2010	Feng Tianwei, Wang Yuegu, Sun Beibei, Yu Mengyu, Li Jiawei	Table tennis	Women's Team	World Table Tennis Championship
2011	Tao Yi Jun, Tay Yu Juan, Emily Sin	Wushu	Women's Dulian	World Wushu Championship
2012	Muhammad Shakir Bin Juanda	Pencak silat	Men's 85-90 kg	World Pencak Silat Championship
2012	Rachel Lee, Cecilia Low	Sailing	Women	420 World Championship
2012	Shayna Ng	Ten-pin bowling	Women's	Bowling World Cup
2013	Peter Gilchrist	Cue sports	English billiards (long format)	World Billiards Championship
2013	Ho Lin Ying	Wushu	Women's Taijiquan	World Wushu Championship
2015	Muhammad Shakir Bin Juanda	Pencak silat	Men's 85-90 kg	World Pencak Silat Championship
2015	Sheik Farhan	Pencak silat	Men's 90-95 kg	World Pencak Silat Championship
2015	Shayna Ng	Ten-pin bowling	Women's All Events	WTBA World Tenpin Bowling Championship
2015	Tan Xiang Tian	Wushu	Men's Xingyiquan	World Wushu Championship
2016	Muhammad Shakir Bin Juanda	Pencak silat	Men's 85-90 kg	World Pencak Silat Championship
2016	Sheik Farhan	Pencak silat	Men's 90-95 kg	World Pencak Silat Championship
2016	Joseph Schooling	Swimming	Men's 100m Butterfly	Olympics
2016	Vera Tan	Wushu (sport) - Taijiquan	Women's Optional Taijiquan	World Taijiquan Championships
2018	Muhammad Hazim Mohd Yusli	Pencak silat	Men's 50-55 kg	World Pencak Silat Championship
2018	Sheik Ferdous	Pencak silat	Men's 85-90 kg	World Pencak Silat Championship
2018	Sheik Farhan	Pencak silat	Men's 90-95 kg	World Pencak Silat Championship
2018	Nurul Suhaila	Pencak silat	Women's 60-65 kg	World Pencak Silat Championship
2018	Muhammad Iqbal Abdul Rahman	Pencak silat	Men's Artistic Single	World Pencak Silat Championship
2018	Nurzuhairah Yazid	Pencak silat	Women's Artistic Single	World Pencak Silat Championship
2018	Nur Azlyana Ismail, Nurhanishah Shahrudin	Pencak silat	Women's Artistic Doubles	World Pencak Silat Championship
2018	Team Firefly Singapore (Kyra Poh, Choo Yi Xuan)	Skydiving Indoor	Dynamic 2-way	World Cup of Indoor Skydiving
2019	Peter Gilchrist	Cue sports	English billiards	World Billiards Championship
2019	Cherie Tan	Ten-pin bowling	Women's Masters	WTBA World Tenpin Bowling Championship
2021	Loh Kean Yew	Badminton	Men's Singles	Badminton World Federation World Championship
2021	Shayna Ng	Ten-pin bowling	Women's Masters	WTBA World Tenpin Bowling Championship
2022	Aniq 'Asri Yazid	Pencak silat	Men's 50-55 kg	World Pencak Silat Championship
2022	Sheik Farhan	Pencak silat	Men's 90-95 kg	World Pencak Silat Championship
2022	Muhammad Iqbal Abdul Rahman	Pencak silat	Men's Artistic Single	World Pencak Silat Championship
2022	Amirah Sahrin, Iffah Batrisyia, Nur Ashikin Zulkifli	Pencak silat	Women's Artistic Trio	World Pencak Silat Championship
2022	Farhanna Farid	Powerlifting	Women's Open Under-52 kg	World Open Classic Powerlifting Championship
2022	Kyra Poh	Skydiving Indoor	Solo Freestyle	World Cup of Indoor Skydiving
2023	Peter Gilchrist	Cue sports	English billiards	World Billiards Championship
2023	Farhanna Farid	Powerlifting	Women's Open Under-52 kg	World Open Classic Powerlifting Championship
2023	Max Maeder	Sailing	Men's Formula Kite	Sailing World Championship
2023	Kyra Poh	Skydiving Indoor	Solo Freestyle	World Indoor Skydiving Championships
2023	Darren Ong	Ten-pin bowling	Men's Single	WTBA World Tenpin Bowling Championship
2023	Daphne Tan, Cherie Tan	Ten-pin bowling	Women's Doubles	WTBA World Tenpin Bowling Championship
2023	Jowen Lim	Wushu	Men’s Gunshu	World Wushu Championship
2023	Zeanne Law	Wushu	Women’s Taijiquan	World Wushu Championship
2023	Alvin Woo, Low Yi Hao	Xiangqi	Men's Team	World Xiangqi Championship
2024	Max Maeder	Sailing	Men's Formula Kite	Formula Kite World Championship
2024	Kai Minejima-Lee	Skydiving Indoor	Solo Freestyle	World Cup of Indoor Skydiving
2024	Zeanne Law	Wushu - Taijiquan	Women's Optional Taijiquan	World Taijiquan Championships
2024	Vera Tan	Wushu - Taijiquan	Women's Optional Taijijian	World Taijiquan Championships
2024	Zeanne Law	Wushu - Taijiquan	Women's Optional Taijishan	World Taijiquan Championships
2024	Charlotte Ng	Wushu - Taijiquan	Women's Third Set Taijiquan (39 Movements)	World Taijiquan Championships
2024	Vera Tan	Wushu - Taijiquan	Women's New Yang Style Taijiquan	World Taijiquan Championships
2024	Tan Jia Wei	Virtual Taekwondo - Taekwondo	Young Adult Female Individual	World Taekwondo Virtual Championships
2024	Justin Peh	Virtual Taekwondo - Taekwondo	Young Adult Male Individual	World Taekwondo Virtual Championships
2024	Brian Peh	Virtual Taekwondo - Taekwondo	Adult Mixed Individual	World Taekwondo Virtual Championships
2024	Sheik Farhan	Pencak silat	Men's 90-95 kg	World Pencak Silat Championship
2024	Sheik Ferdous	Pencak silat	Men's 85-90 kg	World Pencak Silat Championship
2025	Kyra Poh, Vera Poh, Choo Yi Xuan and Kai Minejima-Lee	Skydiving Indoor	Dynamic 4-way	World Cup of Indoor Skydiving
2026	Kai Minejima-Lee	Skydiving Indoor	Solo Freestyle	World Cup of Indoor Skydiving
2026	Kyra Poh, Vera Poh, Choo Yi Xuan and Kai Minejima-Lee	Skydiving Indoor	Dynamic 4-way	World Cup of Indoor Skydiving
2026	Aloysius Yapp	Cue sports	Eight-ball Pool	WPA World Eight-ball Championship
2026	Zeanne Law	Wushu - Taijiquan	Women's Optional Taijiquan Fan	World Taijiquan Championships
2026	Zeanne Law	Wushu - Taijiquan	Women's Optional Taijiquan Sword	World Taijiquan Championships
2026	Vera Tan	Wushu - Taijiquan	Women's New Yang-style Taijiquan	World Taijiquan Championships
2026	Tay Yu Xuan	Wushu - Taijiquan	Men’s Sun-style 73-movement Taijiquan	World Taijiquan Championships
2026	Max Maeder	Sailing	Men's Formula Kite	Formula Kite World Championship

== Number of world champions by sport (total: 78) ==
- Badminton = 1
- Cue sports = 4
- Bodybuilding = 2
- Pencak silat = 20
- Powerlifting = 2
- Sailing = 8
- Skydiving Indoor = 7
- Swimming = 1
- Table-tennis = 1
- Ten-pin bowling = 10
- Virtual Taekwondo = 3
- Windsurfing = 1
- Wushu = 6
- Wushu - Taijiquan = 10
- Xiangqi = 2

== See also ==
- Sport in Singapore
- Singapore National Olympic Council
- List of Singaporean Records in Athletics
- List of Singaporean Records in Swimming
- List of Singaporean Records in Track Cycling
