= Kyra Poh =

Singaporean indoor skydiver (born 2002)

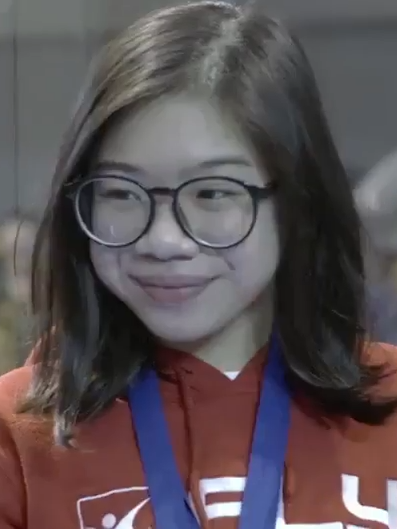
- Portrait of Kyra Poh at The Wind Games 2018

Personal information
- Nationality: Singaporean
- Born: 8 June 2002 (age 24) Singapore

Sport
- Sport: Indoor Skydiving

Kyra Poh (born 8 June 2002; Chinese: 傅诗玲; pinyin: Fù Shīlíng) is a Singaporean indoor skydiver.

== Biography ==
Poh was introduced to indoor skydiving in 2010 when her mother was working on advertising for iFly Singapore, an indoor skydiving facility located at Sentosa, Singapore. Poh and her friend, Choo Yi Xuan would go on to represent Singapore in competitions internationally as Team Firefly Singapore. The team debuted in 2014 at the Bodyflight World Challenge, competing in "Dynamic 2-way" and "2 way Freefly - Open" events, and was placed fifth in the open event.

In 2017, Poh took the gold medal in the solo speed category at the Wind Games, riding wind at speed of 230 km/h in a vertical wind tunnel. For that, she was acknowledged as 'the world's fastest flyer'.

In 2018, Poh fractured her rib while jumping for an outdoor skydiving license. This delayed her from getting the license until in 2020, when she completed the course.

Her training for indoor skydiving was interrupted during the COVID-19 pandemic in Singapore, when the 2020–21 Singapore "circuit breaker" measures prevented her and fellow athletes from using the wind tunnel facility at iFly Singapore until June 2021 when the lockdown measures began to loosen up.

In 2022, Poh was given a national-level sports scholarship that usually given to athletes participating the mainstream sports, thus becoming the first niche sports athlete to be awarded.

== Achievements ==
Year	Competition	Venue	Event	Position	Notes
2014	Bodyflight World Challenge	Bedford, United Kingdom	Dynamic 2-way		iFly Singapore 1
2015	Inflight Dubai – Clash of Champions	Dubai, United Arab Emirates	Dynamic 2-way		Team Firefly Singapore
2015	Inflight Dubai – Clash of Champions	Dubai, United Arab Emirates	4-way Formation		Team Skyblockers
2016	Bodyflight World Challenge	Bedfordshire, England			Team Firefly Singapore
2016	World Cup of Indoor Skydiving	Warsaw, Poland	junior freestyle		63.3 points
2016	Australian Indoor Skydiving Championships		Freestyle open		
2017	Wind Games	Catalonia, Spain	solo speed		
2017	Wind Games	Catalonia, Spain	freestyle		
2017	Australian Indoor Skydiving Championships		Freestyle open		
2017	Australian Indoor Skydiving Championships		Dynamic 4-Way Speed Open		The Assassins
2017	Australian Indoor Skydiving Championships		Dynamic 2-Way Open		Team Firefly Singapore
2017	Australian Indoor Skydiving Championships		4-Way Formation Skydiving		Team Skyblockers
2017	World Cup of Indoor Skydiving	Laval, Canada	junior freestyle		64.1 points
2017	World Cup of Indoor Skydiving	Laval, Canada	Dynamic 2-way		Team Firefly Singapore
2018	Wind Games	Girona, Spain	freestyle		547.80 points
2018	Wind Games	Girona, Spain	4-way speed		285.625 seconds
2018	Asiania Indoor Skydiving Championships	Chongqing, China	solo freestyle		
2018	Asiania Indoor Skydiving Championships	Chongqing, China	Dynamic 2-way		Team Firefly Singapore
2018	World Cup of Indoor Skydiving	Bahrain	solo freestyle		
2018	World Cup of Indoor Skydiving	Bahrain	Dynamic 2-way		Team Firefly Singapore
2019	World Cup of Indoor Skydiving	Lille, France	solo freestyle		
2022	World Cup of Indoor Skydiving	Charleroi, Belgium	solo freestyle		
2023	World Indoor Skydiving Championships	Slovakia	solo freestyle		

== See also ==
- List of Singapore world champions in sports
- Sport in Singapore
