= Canadian Sport Parachuting Association =

Official organization for sport parachuting in Canada

- Sport: Skydiving
- Jurisdiction: Canada
- Founded: 1956
- Affiliation: International Parachuting Commission
- Affiliation date: 1956
- Headquarters: 204 - 1468 Laurier Street
- Location: Rockland, Ontario
- President: Kaneena Vanstone
- Vice president: Brian diCenzo

Official website
- www.cspa.ca
- (Canada)

The Canadian Sport Parachuting Association (CSPA), through affiliation with the Aero Club of Canada (ACC), is Canada's representative to the Fédération Aéronautique Internationale (FAI) and the International Parachuting Commission (IPC). Thus, the CSPA is the official sport organization for sport parachuting in Canada.

== Objectives ==
The stated objective of the CSPA is to "promote safe and enjoyable sport parachuting through cooperation, adherence to self-imposed rules, and recommendations".

Skydivers and skydiving companies that wish to be members of the CSPA must adhere to the established Basic Safety Rules throughout their parachuting career. Such rules include minimum opening altitudes for certain levels of experience, mandatory equipment, clear weather conditions for jumping, reserve repack due dates, general operational requirements, etc. These Basic Safety Rules significantly reduce the risk of accidents for individual skydivers, skydiving companies, and the sport. A Canadian Drop Zone must adhere to all of these safety rules to be a member of the CSPA.

The CSPA also has recommended procedures and instructor qualification requirements. A Canadian skydiver starts with a solo license and then progresses to the A, B, C, and D licenses. The CSPA requires that skydivers keep a log of every jump signed by another jumper and submit that logbook to acquire these qualifications.

The CSPA constantly updates all programs and initiatives to adapt to increasing incidents and changes in technology. Every member (skydiver or skydiving company) must implement all changes to remain members.

== CanPara ==
The CSPA publishes CanPara, a bimonthly bilingual publication devoted to informing the Canadian skydiving community of important activities and events in Canadian and worldwide skydiving. CanPara is produced by Annaleah McAvoy and Vic Lefrançois.

== Organization ==
The CSPA comprises Registered Participants and Member Groups. The Board of Directors will consist of no less than three and no more than seven Directors.

National Office Staff:

- Executive Director: Michelle Matte-Stotyn
- Executive Secretary: Judy Renaud

There are several committees and officers that assist the BoD:

- Three Standing Committees:
  - Technical & Safety Committee
  - Coaching Working Committee
  - Competition & National Teams Committee.
- Ad-hoc committees (a sampling):
  - CanPara - Bi-Monthly, bilingual Magazine
  - Comp./Dev - Competition Development
  - GRC - Government Regulatory Committee
  - IT - Information Technology
  - LTAD - Long Term Athlete Development

== See also ==
- Parachute
- Parachuting
- Parachute rigger
- Canadian Airborne Forces Association
- SkyHawks Parachute Team
- United States Parachute Association
