= Canadian Airborne Forces Association =

The Canadian Airborne Forces Association (CAFA) is the umbrella organization for all military airborne associations within Canada. CAFA membership is open to all qualified Canadian military parachutists, as well as military parachutists from Allied countries. Associate membership is available to non-jump qualified applicants, considered on a case-by-case basis.

== Membership ==
Current membership mainly consists of former members of airborne regiments, such as the Canadian Airborne Regiment and The Queen's Own Rifles of Canada.

== Branches ==
CAFA currently has 8 branches across Canada.

- Branch #1 - Toronto
- Branch #4 - Cambridge
- Branch #7 - London
- Branch #8 - Chilliwack
- Branch #9 - Kingston
- Branch #13 - Barrie (Huronia)
- Branch #15 - Montreal
- Branch #16 - Nova Scotia

== Activities ==
CAFA publishes a magazine, The Maroon Beret, once a year. It is billed as "the Journal of the Canadian Airborne Brotherhood".

CAFA also hosts an Annual Airborne Luncheon at the Royal Canadian Military Institute in Toronto, Ontario.

== See also ==
- Canadian Sport Parachuting Association

== External ==
Canadian Airborne Forces Association
