= Aerodium =

Company based in Riga, Latvia

Aerodium Technologies
- Industry: Entertainment, Military, Film industry
- Founded: 1979; 47 years ago
- Founder: Jean Saint-Germain
- Headquarters: Riga, Latvia
- Key people: Ingus Augstkalns; Uldis Baumanis; Ivars Beitāns; Irita Kukoja
- Services: Production; Construction
- Revenue: ▼€ 3.1 million (2024)
- Net income: ▲€ -107.1 thousands (2024)
- Total equity: ▼€ 862.1 thousands (2024)
- Owner: Ivars Beitāns (69%); Uldis Baumanis (21%); Ingus Augstkalns (10%)
- Number of employees: 30 (2024)
- Website: www.aerodium.technology

Aerodium Technologies is a designer and producer of vertical wind tunnels based in Riga, Latvia. Its core business is related to sales and rent of wind tunnels for entertainment and military industries, but it also operates different locations under franchise. A second part is connected to organizing shows and performances for brand promotion, festivals and other celebrations around the world.

== History ==
In 1979 the Canadian inventor Jean Saint-Germain came up with the idea of the first vertical wind tunnel for bodyflight. After accumulating investments of $450,000, he opened the first commercial wind tunnel in Saint-Simon-de-Bagot, 50 miles east of Montreal. Saint-Germain, who was a former parachutist in the army, owned two parachute schools as he came to the idea that an Aerodium would help his students to practice free falling more efficiently. In 1982 Jean Saint-Germain sold the vertical wind tunnel concept to Les Thompson and Marvin Kratter, who went on to build their own wind tunnels in Pigeon Forge, Tennessee and Las Vegas, Nevada, respectively. Soon after, Saint-Germain sold the franchising rights to Kratter for $1.5 million. Originally known as the "Aérodium", it was patented as the "Levitationarium" by Jean Saint-Germain in the US in 1984 and 1994 under Patent Nos. 4,457,509 and 5,318,481, respectively.

In 2003, after meeting François Saint-Germain (son of Jean Saint-Germain), the Latvian entrepreneur Ivars Beitāns decided to elaborate on the Aerodium wind tunnel concept. In summer 2005 the first wind tunnel in Eastern Europe was opened in Sigulda, Latvia. Step by step improving and upgrading the technical solutions, the company started manufacturing commercial wind tunnels in Latvia under the name Aerodium Technologies.

== Shows, performances, and milestones ==
Having a dedicated focus on open-air wind tunnels, Aerodium has over the years become the leading company to participate in different bodyflying shows and performances around the world.

A milestone in vertical wind tunnel history was the 'Wind Machine' at the closing ceremonies of the 2006 Torino Winter Olympics, which was a custom-built unit by Aerodium. Most viewers in the world had never seen a vertical wind tunnel before and were fascinated by the flying humans with no wires. The show included a flying snowboarder (performed by Ivars Beitāns himself) and other visual effects never seen before.

A vertical wind tunnel performance in Moscow's Red Square was shown in 2009 during the presentation of the logotype of 2014 Sochi Winter Olympics.

In 2010, a vertical wind tunnel was exhibited at the Latvian pavilion of World Expo 2010 in Shanghai, China. Aerodium was the pavilion's general contractor and presented shows to the visitors every 30 minutes for 6 months. It gathered large crowds and even allowed some VIPs to train and fly in the tunnel. The tunnel was the world's first fully transparent recirculation wind tunnel, allowing spectators to view the performances from all sides.

2013 saw the introduction of a new wind tunnel application when Aerodium built the world's first tunnel suited for indoor BASE jumping at the “Sirius Sport Resort” in Finland. Compared to other models, skydivers could now enter the wind tunnel from the ground or jump into it from a height of 15 meters, simulating jumping down from a building.

In 2016 Aerodium presented a project called “Flying Dream”, which is a unique wind tunnel-amphitheatre. It is located in Dengfeng, in the middle of the Song Mountains, near the famous Shaolin Monastery in China. The wind tunnel is part of a “flight and monks” kung fu show.

The same year Shanghai Disneyland Park, the first one in mainland China, opened in Pudong, China. Aerodium was invited to design a unique permanent wall-less wind tunnel for the live-action Pirates of the Caribbean show: Eye of the Storm: Captain Jack’s Stunt Spectacular. As of 2019, it is the only recirculation type wall-less wind tunnel in the world.

In 2021 Aerodium launched a new type of open-air wind tunnel. Its main upgrade is the reduced noise level (65 dB), which is comparable to indoor tunnels. The first tunnel of the new generation was opened for Riyadh Season in November 2022.

On April 29th 2023 amidst on-going war in Ukraine, Aerodium opened a wind tunnel inside one of the largest shopping centres in Europe, the Respublika mall.

== Movie projects ==
Aerodium's outdoor wind tunnels have also gained interest from the film industry. During Expo 2010 Jackie Chan tried flying in a vertical tunnel of the Latvian pavilion. Two years later, in 2012, he spent 3 weeks training and filming in Latvia for an air fight scene for the movie "Chinese Zodiac".

In 2017 Aerodium built the largest vertical wind tunnel in the world measuring 20 feet by 10 feet, which is four times the size of a typical wind tunnel. It was given the name Peryton and used by Tom Cruise while training for the sixth installment in the Mission: Impossible film series titled "Fallout". To film one of the early scenes of the movie Tom Cruise had to perform over 100 HALO jumps. According to Neil Corbould, the special effects supervisor, “it was quite a lot, but you know, if he hadn’t had the time in the wind tunnel, it would’ve been 250.”
