= Wind Games =

The WindGames

Tournament information
- Sport: Indoor skydiving
- Location: Empuriabrava, Spain
- Established: 2014
- Broadcast: Wind Games's channel on YouTube
- Website: www.windoor-realfly.com/en/windgames

The WindGames (formerly The Wind Games) are annual indoor skydiving competitions hosted by Windoor, an operator of vertical wind tunnels.

== History ==
The first WindGames event took place in 2014 at Windoor's indoor skydiving facility in Empuriabrava, Spain, where every event has been held since. The competition featured four main indoor skydiving disciplines: Formation Skydiving (FS), Vertical Formation Skydiving (VFS) and 2-way Dynamic (D2W).

=== The 2016 musical freestyle round ===
In January 2016, the third Wind Games became the first indoor skydiving competition in history to mandate a musical interpretation round for all freestyle competitors. While international sporting bodies such as the Fédération Aéronautique Internationale (FAI) had previously allowed music as an optional element, the 2016 Wind Games made choreographed musical flight a compulsory requirement for the event.

The concept began in August 2015 when Anne Maxwell, the creator of the Wind Games and former Pro Flyer manager at Windoor, contacted Mexican-Canadian competitor Lise Hernandez Girouard, who had previously pioneered musical integration in wind tunnels. Maxwell sought to introduce the solo freestyle discipline to the competition featuring a mandatory musical round. Hernandez Girouard organized the category, drafting the official competition rules and serving as the Head Judge.

The new freestyle format required athletes to perform three specific rounds:

- Low-Speed Flow: Evaluating body control and continuous artistic lines at lower wind speeds.
- High-Speed Flight: Evaluating technical power, speed, and vertical acrobatic transitions.
- Mandatory Musical Interpretation: Evaluating an original choreographed routine set to a chosen music track.

To score the musical round across both technical execution and artistic expression, the judging panel was hybridized to include technical freeflyer Adam Mattacola, professional dance choreographer Dolo Yglesias, and Hernandez Girouard.

Five athletes competed in the inaugural event. Russian athlete Leonid Volkov won first place with a highly theatrical routine, Polish athlete Maja Kuczyńska won second, and Canadian Guillaume Boileau won third.

Driven by the new musical format, videos of the 2016 performances achieved unprecedented publicity for the sport. The routine of Leonid Volkov was the first routine to pierce the attention of the media. A video of Kuczyńska's routine set to the song "Chandelier" by Sia went viral on social media, amassing over 100 million views and bringing massive mainstream awareness to the niche sport of indoor skydiving. This global viewership secured Red Bull as the main title sponsor for the event the following year.

=== 2017 Format Changes ===
In 2017, the Wind Games changed the freestyle format. The competition removed professional dancers from the judging panel and introduced mandatory flight elements for athletes to execute, aligning the rules more closely with the technical standards of the Fédération Aéronautique Internationale (FAI).

=== Recent History ===
The 2021 WindGames indoor skydiving competition was cancelled due to an extended pause in operations caused by the COVID-19 pandemic. Following this pause, the WindGames resumed in 2024.. The next edition, the WindGames 2027, is scheduled to be held on January 28, 29, and 30, 2027.

The WindGames include Vertical Formation Skydiving, 4-way Formation Skydiving, 2-way Dynamic, 4-way Dynamic, Solo Speed, Freestyle and Freestyle Junior.

== Events ==
Year	Date	City	Videos
2014	17–18 January	(Spain) Empuriabrava	
2015	23–24 January	(Spain) Empuriabrava	
2016	21–23 January	(Spain) Empuriabrava	
2017	3–4 February	(Spain) Empuriabrava	
2018	1–3 February	(Spain) Empuriabrava	
2019	31 January – 2 February	(Spain) Empuriabrava	
2020	30 January – 1 February	(Spain) Empuriabrava	
2024	23–24 February	(Spain) Empuriabrava	
2025	30 January – 1 February	(Spain) Empuriabrava	

== Medalists ==
=== Vertical Formation Skydiving ===
Year	Gold	Silver	Bronze
2014	Team 4 Speed	Transfert	Element
2015	Avalon Realfly Sion		
2016	SDC Core	Avalon Realfly Sion	Transfert
2017	SDC Core	Amudy	Flyspot Definition
2018	SkyRiders	Esercito	4 amigos
2019	Italy VFS Team	SkyRiders Flyspot VFS	Ycaro Speed
2020	Full Speed	Esercito	Windoor Team
2024	Windoor barcelona	Vertical Storm	Top Top Quality
2025	Flyspot Synapses	VFS Warriors	Grip

=== 4-way Formation Skydiving ===
Year	Gold	Silver	Bronze
2014	NMP PCH HayaBusa	Arizona Airspeed	
2015	NMP PCH HayaBusa	Arizona Airspeed	Gavroche
2016			
2017	NMP PCH HayaBusa	Weembi Lille	Realfly Sion
2018	NMP PCH HayaBusa	Arizona Airspeed	Realfly Sion
2019	NMP PCH HayaBusa	Weembi High Rollers	Arizona Airspeed
2020	NMP PCH HayaBusa	Arizona Airspeed	SDC Rhythm XP
2024	Aethers Medjay	Qatar Tigers	NFTO
2025	Aethers Medjay	NMP PCH HayaBusa	Tunnel Vision

=== 2-way Dynamic ===
Year	Gold	Silver	Bronze
2014			
2015			
2016			
2017	Windobono	Hurricane Factory	Windoor Warriors
2018	Vipers	Windoor GB	Aspire
2019			
2020			
2024	Fanatics	Dodos	Eaglets
2025	2WD Windoor	Windoor's Warriors Eaglets	Siro Gravity Windwerk

=== 4-way Dynamic ===
Year	Gold	Silver	Bronze
2014			
2015			
2016			
2017	Windoor D4W	Friends 4 Eva	Guns & Waffles
2018	Nemesis	Windoor Vengadores	Windoor Fighters
2019			
2020			
2024	Kings of the Sky	Windwerk	Eaglets Fanatics Arena
2025	Windoor Empuriabrava	Kings of the Sky	Guardians of the Galaxy

=== Solo Speed ===
Year	Gold	Silver	Bronze
2014			
2015			
2016			
2017	Kyra Poh	Cesar Rico	Jamie Arnold
2018	Cesar Rico	Andrzej Soltyk	Noah Wittenburg
2019			
2020			
2024	James Rogers	Adrien Gallot	Lewis Hard
2025	Adrien Gallot	Lewis Hard	Cesar Rico

=== Freestyle ===
Year	Gold	Silver	Bronze
2014			
2015			
2016	Leonid Volkov	Maja Kuczyńska	Guillaume Boileau
2017	Kyra Poh	Jakub Harrer	Maja Kuczyńska
2018	Kyra Poh	Kaleigh Wittenburg	Maja Kuczyńska
2019			
2020			
2024	James Rogers	Evelina Kalugina	Daphny Morali
2025	Daphny Morali	Harrison Noel Murdock	Johannes Heptner

=== Freestyle Junior ===
Year	Gold	Silver	Bronze
2014			
2015			
2016			
2017			
2018			
2019			
2020	Sydney Kennett	Kai Minejima Lee	Mate Feith
2024	Sofiya Korkhina	Fuyuki Kono	Tacy Giacometti
2025	Julia Schweizer	Melania Bociaga	Uliana Volynets

== See also ==
- Bodyflight
- Indoor freestyle skydiving
- Lise Hernandez Girouard
- Leonid Volkov (skydiver)
- Maja Kuczyńska
