= World Indoor Skydiving Championships =

- Maja Kuczyńska at the 2017 World Indoor Skydiving Championships in Laval, Canada

Tournament information
- Sport: Skydiving
- Established: 2014
- Number of tournaments: 10

The World Indoor Skydiving Championships (WISC), also known as the World Cup of Indoor Skydiving, is an annual indoor skydiving competition sanctioned by the Fédération Aéronautique Internationale (FAI).

== History ==
WISC was founded in 2014 after the International Parachuting Commission modified its skydiving rules to allow for use indoors. The first WISC event was held at iFLY Austin in Austin, Texas and was attended by a small group of indoor skydiving enthusiasts. From 2014 to 2019, the sport grew significantly in number of competitors, number of categories, and skill level of participants.

Both the 2020 and 2021 WISC events were postponed due to the COVID-19 pandemic. The 2022 Russian invasion of Ukraine caused the FAI to ban Russian athletes from participating in its events, leading to roughly 70 of the 400 registered flyers being unable to compete in the 2022 Charleroi WISC event. The sport has continued to grow since then, with clips of freestyle performances going viral on social media.

== Events ==
Year	Date	City	Videos
2014	11 – 16 November	(United States) Austin	N/A
2015	21 – 24 October	(Czech Republic) Prague	
2016	11 – 16 October	(Poland) Warsaw	
2017	18 – 23 October	(Canada) Laval	
2018	24 – 29 October	(Bahrain) Zallaq	
2019	17 – 20 April	(France) Lille	
2022	6 – 9 April	(Belgium) Charleroi	
2023	18 – 23 April	(Slovakia) Liptovský Mikuláš	
2024	17 – 21 April	(China) Macau	
2025	9 – 12 April (Formation Skydiving) 22 – 28 April (Artistic Events and Dynamic)	(United States) Raeford (Belgium) Charleroi	
2026	31 March – 5 April (Artistic Events and Dynamic) 8 – 12 April (Formation Skydiving)	(France) Bouc-Bel-Air (France) Lille	

== Medalists ==
=== 4-Way Formation Skydiving Open ===
Year	Gold	Silver	Bronze
2014	(Czech Republic) Bad Boys	(United States) Spaceland Light	(Sweden) Team Exact
2015	Belgium	(Russia) Russian Federation	France
2016	(Belgium) HayaBusa	France 2	France 1
2017	Belgium	France	(United States) USA
2018	France	(Belgium) HayaBusa	(Italy) Amnesya
2019	Belgium	France	United States of America
2022	(United States) Arizona Airspeed	(France) Aerokart	(Belgium) Hayabusa
2023	(United States) USA FS Open	(France) FRA FS Open	(Belgium) BEL FS Open
2024	(United States) Arizona Airspeed	France FS	Qatar Tigers
2025	France 4	(United States) USA 4	Belgium 4
2026	France 1	(United States) USA 1	Belgium 1

=== 4-Way Formation Skydiving Female ===
Year	Gold	Silver	Bronze
2014	(France) Aerokart Deep Blue	(Czech Republic) HF Chicks	not awarded
2015	(United States) USA	France	(United Kingdom) Great Britain
2016	France 1	(United Kingdom) Volition	(United Kingdom) NFTO
2017	France	(United Kingdom) UK	Czech Republic
2018	(United Kingdom) NFTO	France	(Sweden) Team X
2019	France Female	United Kingdom Female	United States of America Female
2022	(Czech Republic) HF Cubs	France	(Germany) Piteraq
2023	(France) FRA FS Female	(United States) USA FS Female	(United Kingdom) GBR FS Female
2024	China 4 Way FS Female Team 1	(United Kingdom) NFTO	(United States) XPG4
2025	China Female	France Female	(United States) USA Female
2026	China 1	France 1	China 2

=== 4-Way Formation Skydiving Junior ===
Year	Gold	Silver	Bronze
2016	(Canada) Air Devils	France JUNIOR 1 AK Demie	(Canada) Tunnel Vision
2017	France	Canada	Czech Republic
2018	(Canada) Air Devils	France Jr	(Czech Republic) HF Cubs
2019	Czech Republic Juniors	France Juniors	(Russia) Russian Federation Juniors
2022	(Czech Republic) HF Flying Rebels	France-Junior	(Czech Republic) Chameleons

=== 4-Way Vertical Formation Skydiving ===
Year	Gold	Silver	Bronze
2014	(United States) SDC Standard	(Poland) Fly Definition	(Mexico) Axis VFS
2015	France	(Russia) Russian Federation	Poland
2016	(United States) SDC Core	(Russia) FlyStation VFS	(United States) Golden Knights
2017	France	(United States) USA	Poland
2018	(United States) SDC Core	(Russia) Flystation Vertical	Italy
2019	United States of America VFS	(Russia) Russian Federation VFS	Italy VFS
2022	(United States) SDC Core	(Italy) Vertical Storm	Poland 1
2023	(United States) USA VFS	(Italy) ITA VFS	(Poland) POL VFS
2024	(Poland) Flyspot Synapses	(United States) Grip	Vstorm Italy
2025	Poland VFS	(United States) USA VFS	Italy VFS
2026	(Poland) Flyspot Synapses	(Italy) Vertical Storm	China Jihua Park

=== 8-Way Formation Skydiving ===
Year	Gold	Silver	Bronze
2025	(United States) USA 8	France 8	Qatar 8
2026	France 3	(United States) USA XP8	France 2

=== Freefly ===
Year	Gold	Silver	Bronze
2014	(United States) Mandrake	(United States) Collective	(Sweden) Orion Freefly

=== Freestyle ===
Year	Gold	Silver	Bronze
2014	(United States) USA Wilson	(United States) Collective Freestyle	Russia 1

=== Dynamic 2-Way ===
Year	Gold	Silver	Bronze
2015	Switzerland	(United Kingdom) Great Britain	(United States) USA
2016	(Poland) Vipers	France 1	Switzerland 1
2017	Poland	Singapore	France
2018	Team Firefly Singapore	France 1	France 2
2019	United States of America DW2	United Kingdom D2W	France 2 D2W
2022	(Germany) Max – Rapha	Spain	(Italy) Jochen Schweizer Arena
2023	(United States) USA D2W 2	(United States) USA D2W 1	(Germany) GER D2W 1
2024	(United States) Fanatics	(United States) Aspire D2W	Singapore 2
2025	(United States) USA 1	Spain 1	Singapore 1
2026	France 1	Singapore 2	Germany 1

=== Dynamic 4-Way ===
Year	Gold	Silver	Bronze
2015	France	Czech Republic	United Arab Emirates
2017	France	Czech Republic	Switzerland
2019	France D4W	Czech Republic D4W	Spain D4W
2022	(United States) Aspire	(Switzerland) Swiss Realfly	France DW4
2023	(United States) USA D4W	(Switzerland) SUI D4W	(Singapore) SPG D4W
2024	(United States) Aspire D4W	Singapore	Germany
2025	Singapore 1	Switzerland 1	Germany 1
2026	Singapore 1	Switzerland 1	Finland 1

=== Dynamic Flying Junior 2-Way ===
Year	Gold	Silver	Bronze
2022	Superfly Singapore	(United States) Rosewater	(United States) USA2 D2W JR
2025	Czech Republic 1	(United States) US 1	Switzerland 1

=== Dynamic Flying Junior 4-Way ===
Year	Gold	Silver	Bronze
2022	Singapore D4W	(United States) Volare	not awarded

=== Dynamic Flying Junior Solo Speed ===
Year	Gold	Silver	Bronze
2025	(France) Sofya Pauzin	(Singapore) Vera Poh	(Belgium) William Vande Vonder
2026	(Belgium) William Vande Vonder	(Switzerland) Robin Huber	(Switzerland) Sina Huber

=== Dynamic Flying Solo Speed ===
Year	Gold	Silver	Bronze
2025	(United States) James Rogers	(Spain) Lewis Hard	(France) Adrien Gallot
2026	(France) Adrien Gallot	(Singapore) Yi Xuan Choo	(Singapore) Kai Minejima Lee

=== Solo Freestyle ===
Year	Gold	Silver	Bronze
2015	(Finland) Inka Tiitto	(Norway) David Reader	(Russia) Leonid Volkov
2016	(Finland) Inka Tiitto	(Russia) Leonid Volkov	(Czech Republic) Martin Dedek
2017	(Russia) Leonid Volkov	(Poland) Maja Kuczyńska	(Czech Republic) Jakub Harrer
2018	(Latvia) Toms Īvāns	(Singapore) Kyra Poh	(Poland) Maja Kuczyńska
2019	(Germany) Rafael Schwaiger	(Singapore) Kyra Poh	(Norway) Amalie Hegland Lauritzen
2022	(Singapore) Kyra Poh	(Poland) Maja Kuczyńska	(Latvia) Toms Īvāns
2023	(Singapore) Kyra Poh	(Poland) Maja Kuczyńska	(Latvia) Toms Īvāns
2024	(Singapore) Kai Minejima Lee	(United States) James Rogers	(Latvia) Toms Īvāns
2025	(Poland) Maja Kuczyńska	(Singapore) Kai Minejima Lee	(Hungary) Máté Feith
2026	(Singapore) Kai Minejima Lee	(Singapore) Kyra Poh	(France) Flavien Poulenard

=== Solo Freestyle Junior ===
Year	Gold	Silver	Bronze
2015	(Poland) Maja Kuczyńska	(Poland) Andrzej Soltyk	(France) Mateo Limnaios
2016	(Singapore) Kyra Poh	(Poland) Andrzej Soltyk	(Poland) Aleksandra Sołtyk
2017	(Singapore) Kyra Poh	(United States) Kaleigh Wittenburg	(Poland) Andrzej Soltyk
2018	(United States) Kaleigh Wittenburg	(Singapore) Yi Xuan Choo	(Canada) Coralie Boudreault
2019	(Australia) Amy Watson	(Canada) Malachi DeAth	(United States) Sydney Kennett
2022	(Singapore) Kai Minejima Lee	(United States) Sydney Kennett	(Brazil) Gabriela Haga Chacorn
2023	(Hungary) Máté Feith	(Singapore) Kai Minejima Lee	(Australia) Ariel Daborn
2024	(Singapore) Isabelle Koh	(Hungary) Máté Feith	(Australia) Ariel Daborn
2025	(Germany) Julia Schweizer	(Australia) Ariel Daborn	(Poland) Mela Bociaga
2026	(Germany) Julia Schweizer	(Germany) Maya Goldwasser	(France) Malya Jalaguier
