= Leonid Volkov (skydiver) =

Russian sportsman

Leo Volkov
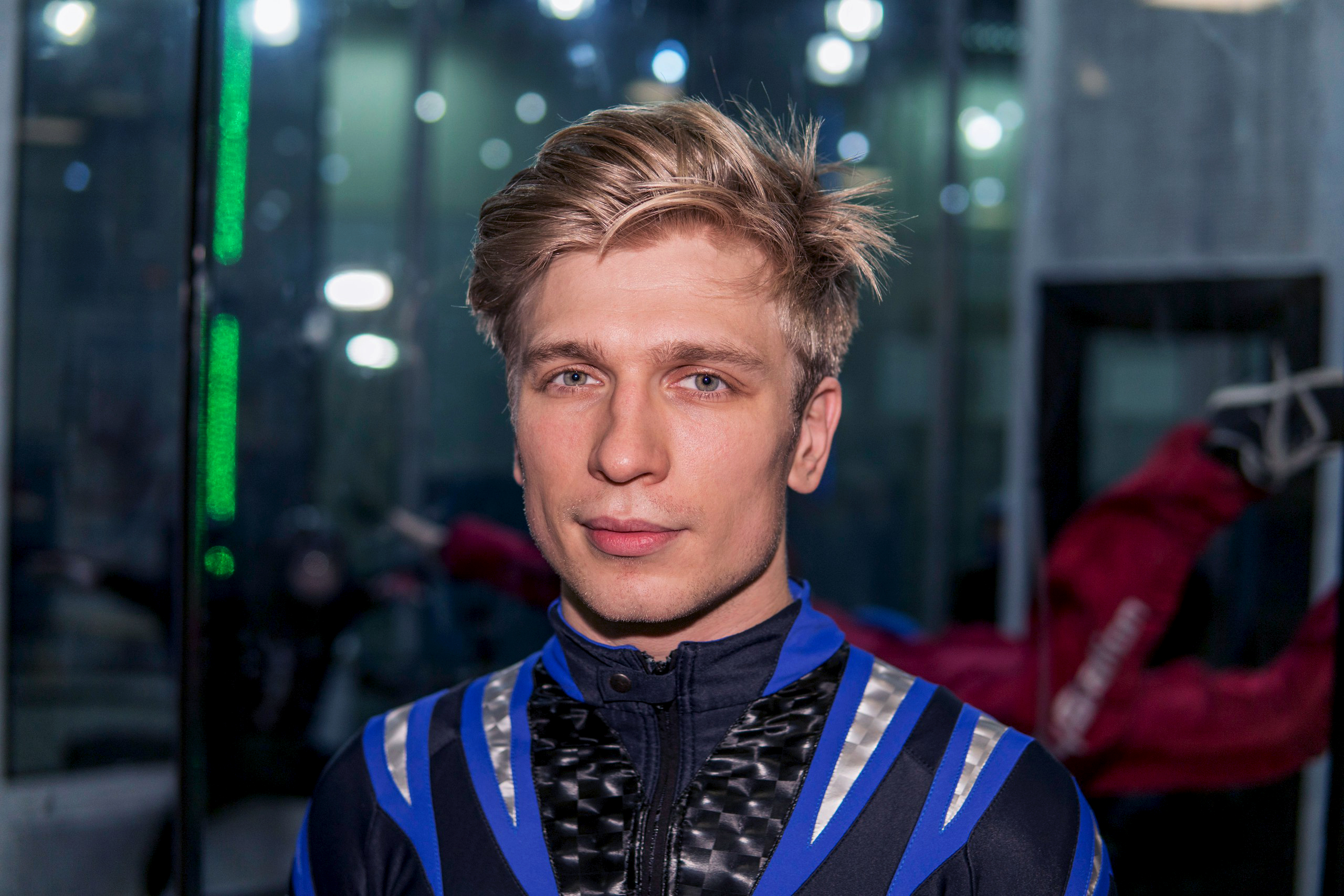

Personal information
- Full name: Leonid Valerievich Volkov
- Nationality: Russia
- Born: 15 October 1988 (age 37) Leningrad, Russian SFSR, Soviet Union
- Website: tunnelsport.com

Sport
- Sport: Indoor Freestyle Skydiving
- Club: TunnelSport
Medal record
Gold medal – first place	2nd FAI World Indoor Skydiving	Freestyle

Leonid Valerievich Volkov (Russian: Леонид Валерьевич Волков; October 15, 1988) is a Russian sportsman, Indoor Skydiving World Champion in Freestyle.

== Biography ==
Volkov was born on October 15, 1988, in Leningrad. From 1995 to 2002 he studied at school, and then from 2002 to 2005 he enrolled at Nakhimov Naval School. In 2005 Leonid entered Military Engineering-Technical University, which he graduated from in 2010. After his graduation from the university, he was allocated to Kaliningrad to serve in the Baltic Fleet. After some time he resigned at his own will to the reserve and returned to St. Petersburg.

In 2012 Volkov started to practice parachute jumping, after which he was hired as an instructor by the first professional indoor skydiving school in Saint Petersburg, FlyStation, where he taught people to manage their own bodies in the airflow. After six months of training, Volkov won an indoor skydiving competition in Saint Petersburg and was admitted to the FlyStation sports team in vertical and dynamic group acrobatics in the airflow. After two years of performances as a part of the team, he turned to single freestyle skydiving.

Since 2015, Volkov has been working on the project TunnelSport.com, where he publishes information about the flight of the body in the airflow.

In 2016, Spain hosted the world's first international musical freestyle competition in indoor skydiving (dancing in the aero tube) called Wind Games, according to the rules of which it was mandatory to use music during the performance (until that all athletes had been skydiving without music), where Leonid Volkov took first place. His performance caught the public eye, going viral. There were three combined tracks in the performance of the Russian sportsman: a waltz from the movie "A Hunting Accident", the soundtrack "Clubbed to death" from "The Matrix" and "Lux Aeterna" from the movie "Requiem for a Dream".

In 2017, Volkov acquired a title of Indoor Skydiving World Champion in Freestyle, having won the World Indoor Skydiving Championship, held in Canada, with 2 points ahead of his opponents.

== Achievements ==
Year	Competition	Venue	Position	Notes
2014	1st FAI World Cup of Indoor Skydiving	Austin, United States	4	55,1
2015	1st FAI World Indoor Skydiving	Prague, Czech Republic	3	59,5
2016	Wind Games	Empuriabrava, Spain	1	486,6
2016	2nd FAI World Cup of Indoor Skydiving	Warsaw, Poland	2	62,4
2016	FAI Russian Championship	Saint Petersburg, Russia	1	
2017	FAI Russian Championship	Saint Petersburg, Russia	1	
2017	2nd FAI World Indoor Skydiving	Montreal, Canada	1	64,9
