= International Skydiving Commission =

- Headquarters: Lausanne, Switzerland
- Website: https://www.fai.org/commission/isc

The International Skydiving Commission (ISC) of the Fédération Aéronautique Internationale (FAI) conducts the FAI's skydiving activities, particularly the World Records and International Competitions, for indoor (vertical wind tunnel) and outdoor (from aircraft).

The commission was formerly known as the International Parachuting Commission, and changed its name on 6 December 2019, at the FAI General Conference in Lausanne. Parachuting is now commonly referred to as skydiving.
