= Freestyle skydiving =

Skydiving discipline

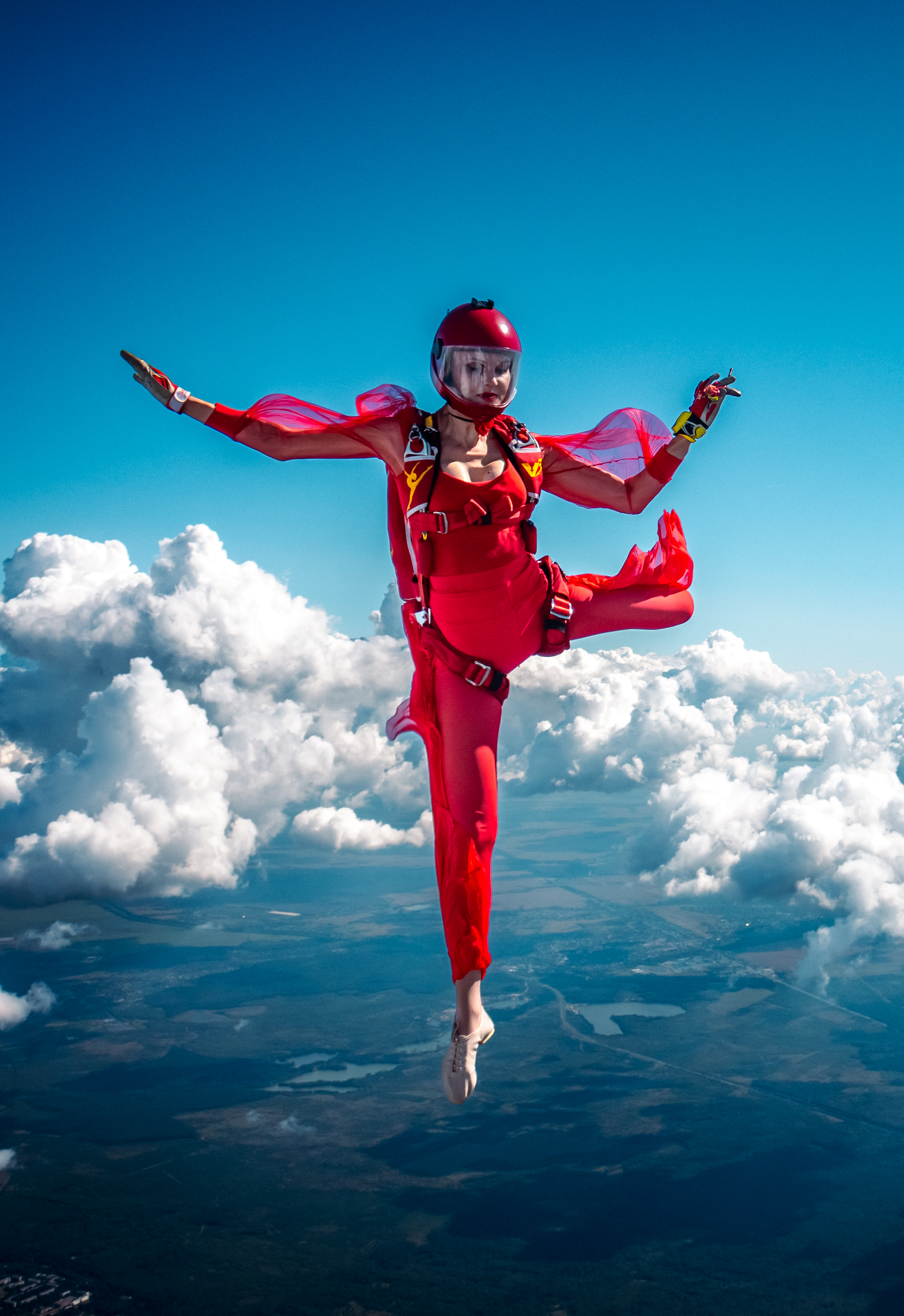
Skydiver performing a freestyle maneuver in freefall

Freestyle skydiving is a competitive skydiving discipline where one member of a two-person team performs acrobatic manoeuvres in free fall while the other one films the performance from a close distance using a helmet-mounted camera.

== History ==
The first ever international skydiving competition was held in 1990 and was directed by World Freestyle Federation. In 1995 the sport gained much popularity across the world and had 62 teams from over 24 countries participating in this competition. This soon made way for World Cup of Skydiving in 1996. Freestyle was first performed by Deanna Kent and others for her husband Norman Kent's 1989 film "From Wings Came Flight". It became a competitive skydiving discipline in the early 1990s and became an official FAI sport in 1996. Pioneers such as Tamara Koyn played a foundational role in establishing freestyle as a formal competitive discipline, notably introducing the use of props—such as pink wind streamers—into world competitions in 1991, where she won a silver medal.

== Outdoor freestyle skydiving ==
Outdoor freestyle skydiving (often referred to simply as freestyle at drop zones) is a form of artistic skydiving performed in open air during freefall from an aircraft. Unlike indoor freestyle, which takes place in a vertical wind tunnel under controlled conditions, outdoor routines are flown in a natural environment and are influenced by factors such as exit speed, density altitude, wind conditions, and horizontal drift. As a discipline, freestyle evolved in parallel with modern sport parachuting equipment and the widespread adoption of helmet-mounted video systems, which made consistent judging from recorded footage possible and supported its emergence as a competitive category in the late 1980s and early 1990s.

Description

An outdoor freestyle performance typically consists of a choreographed freefall routine executed within the usable working time before breakoff, most often around 35–60 seconds, depending on exit altitude and the planned separation sequence. Routines combine a variety of body-flight elements, including spins, flips, layouts, controlled rotations, and transitions between head-up and head-down orientations. While sequences are frequently planned to music to establish timing and phrasing, the soundtrack itself is added during post-production, as performers obviously cannot hear music during freefall.

In freestyle, emphasis is placed not only on the execution of individual maneuvers, but also on how those maneuvers are connected. Judges generally look for continuity and control: clean body lines, stable headings, deliberate transitions, and fall-rate management that appears intentional rather than corrective. As in other judged freefall disciplines, scoring systems combine technical and presentation criteria, with typical components including difficulty, execution quality, artistic impression, and overall video presentation.

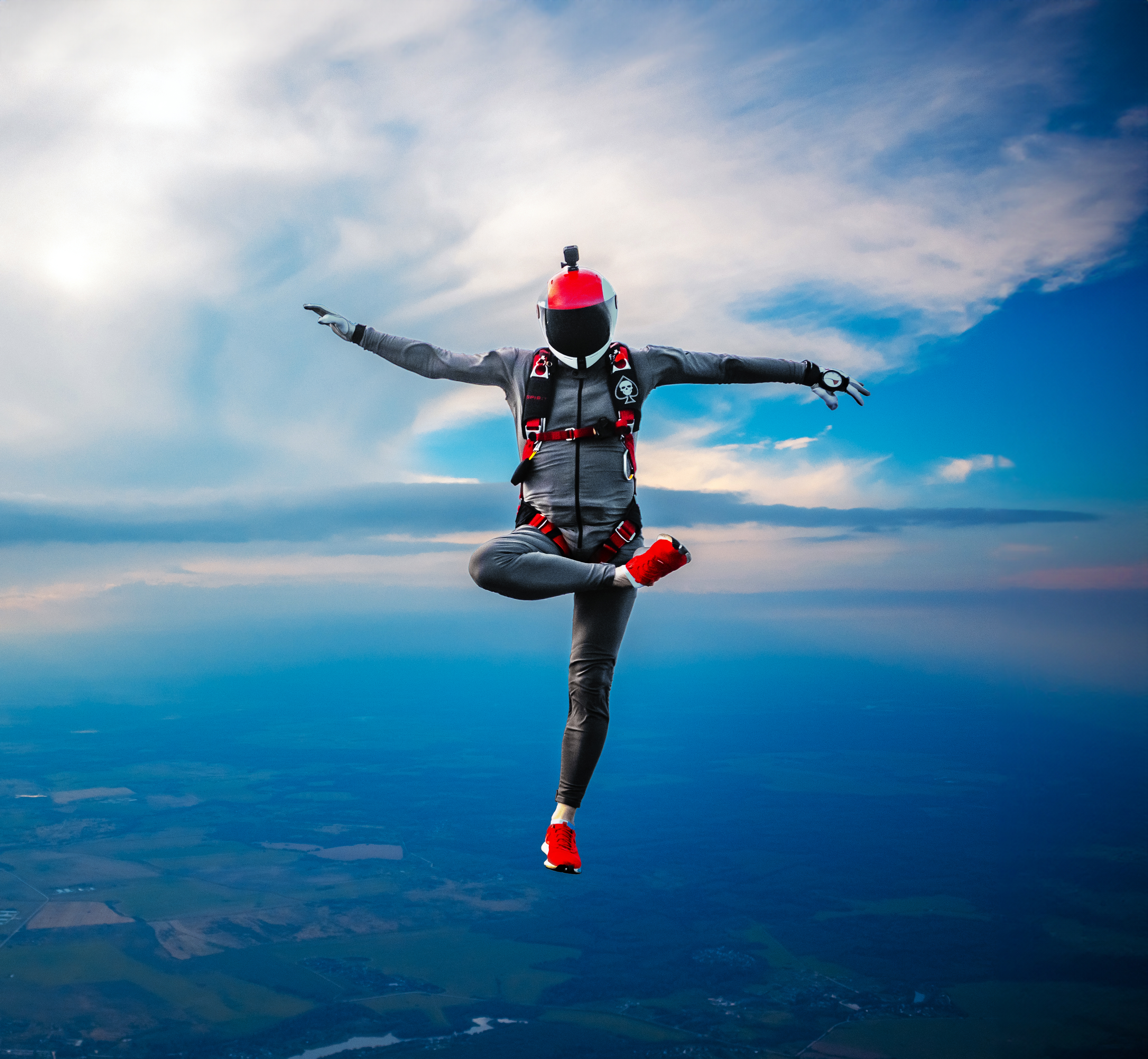
A skydiver balancing in a freestyle freefall pose

Team roles and judging

In competition formats based on video judging, freestyle is normally performed by a two-person team consisting of the performing skydiver and a camera flyer. The camera flyer exits with the performer and records the routine, maintaining appropriate framing, distance, and angle so that judges can clearly assess technique and presentation. Because the final score depends not only on the athlete’s flying but also on the quality of the footage, training and competition are usually approached as a cooperative effort: even a strong routine can be disadvantaged if key positions are missed, transitions fall outside the frame, or the video lacks stability.

Training and environmental factors

Outdoor freestyle requires adaptation to variables that are largely absent in wind-tunnel flying. Wind strength, direction, and drift can affect relative movement and visual orientation, while differences in fall rate between team members influence both performance and filming. In advanced orientations, freefall speeds can exceed 200 km/h, increasing the demands on body control, symmetry, and spatial awareness. As a result, freestyle training often combines tunnel time with outdoor jumps and is frequently supplemented by gymnastics, dance, and general strength and conditioning to support coordination, flexibility, and endurance.

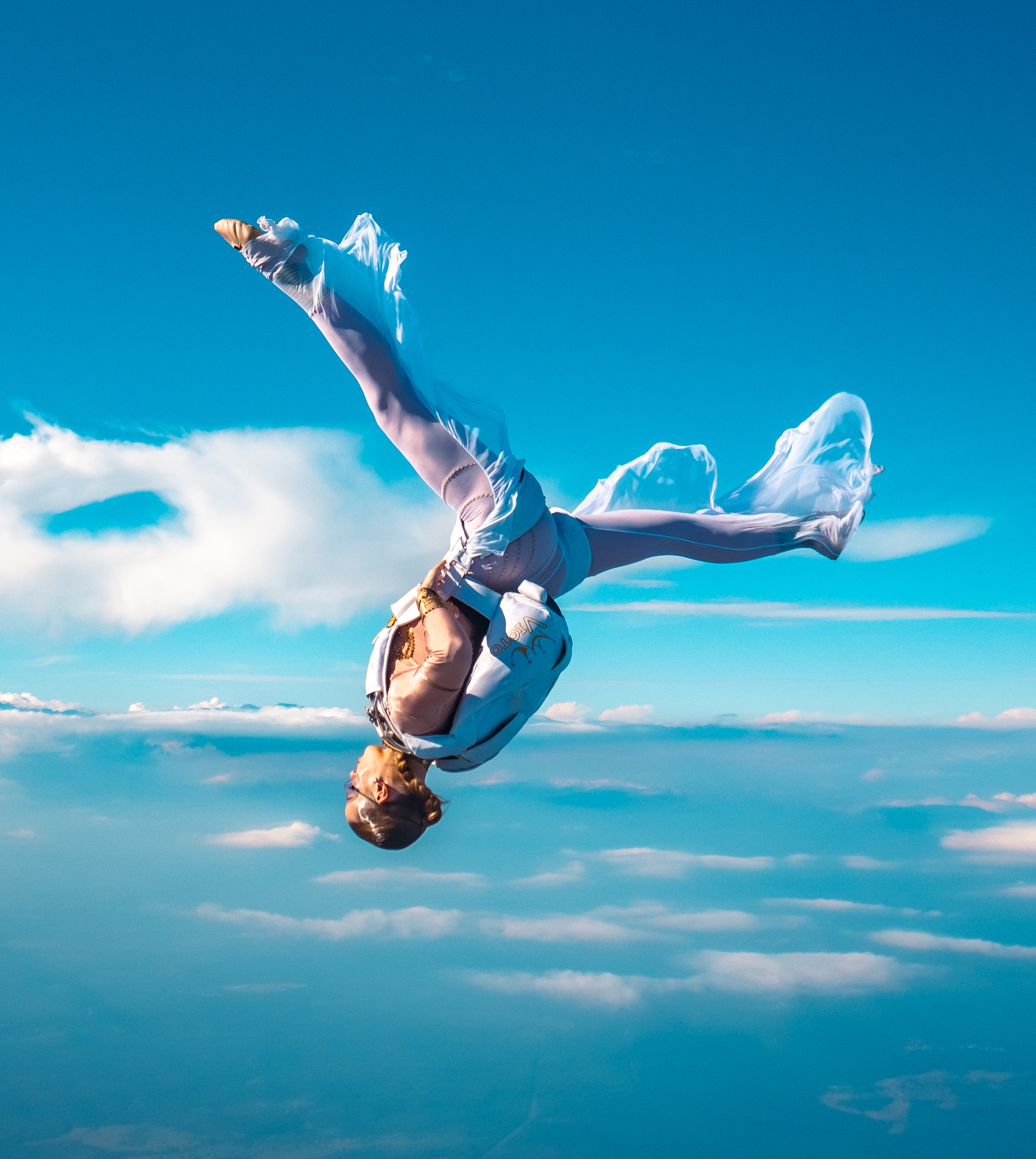
A solo skydiver performing a head-down freefall

History and influence

Outdoor freestyle played an important role in the development of artistic skydiving and related competition categories, including Fédération Aéronautique Internationale (FAI) artistic events and international competitions. Freestyle was among the early artistic disciplines formally recognized in international skydiving competitions during the late twentieth century. Over time, competitive formats and priorities have shifted, and some events have placed greater emphasis on other freefall disciplines. Nevertheless, freestyle has continued to influence the visual and technical language of modern skydiving, contributing to the evolution of freefly-oriented styles, performance flying, and media-focused disciplines.

== Indoor freestyle skydiving ==
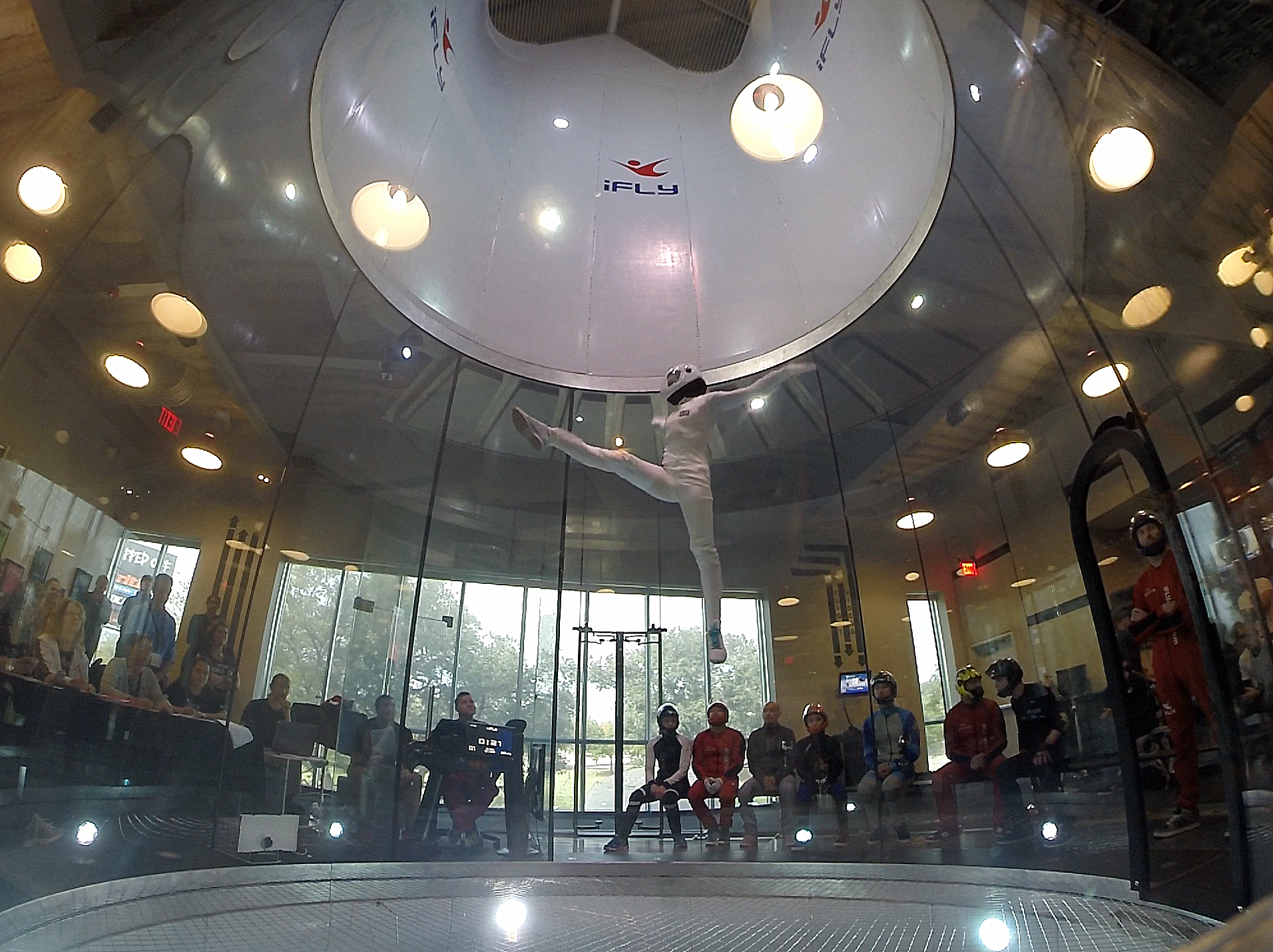
An indoor freestyle skydiving competitor

Indoor freestyle skydiving, is a competitive discipline of indoor skydiving performed within a vertical wind tunnel. It involves a solo flyer performing aerial acrobatics or bodyflight. The discipline is composed of two distinct segments: technical compulsory rounds and artistic free routines, with the free routine often choreographed and synchronized to music, also known as skydancing.

=== Notable milestones and records ===
Amy Watson was entered into the Guinness Book of World Records at age 11 by completing 44 360-degree horizontal spins in one minute.

== See also ==
- Bodyflight
- Freeflying
- Skydiving
- Parachute
- Drop zone
