= Bodyflight =

Skydiving discipline

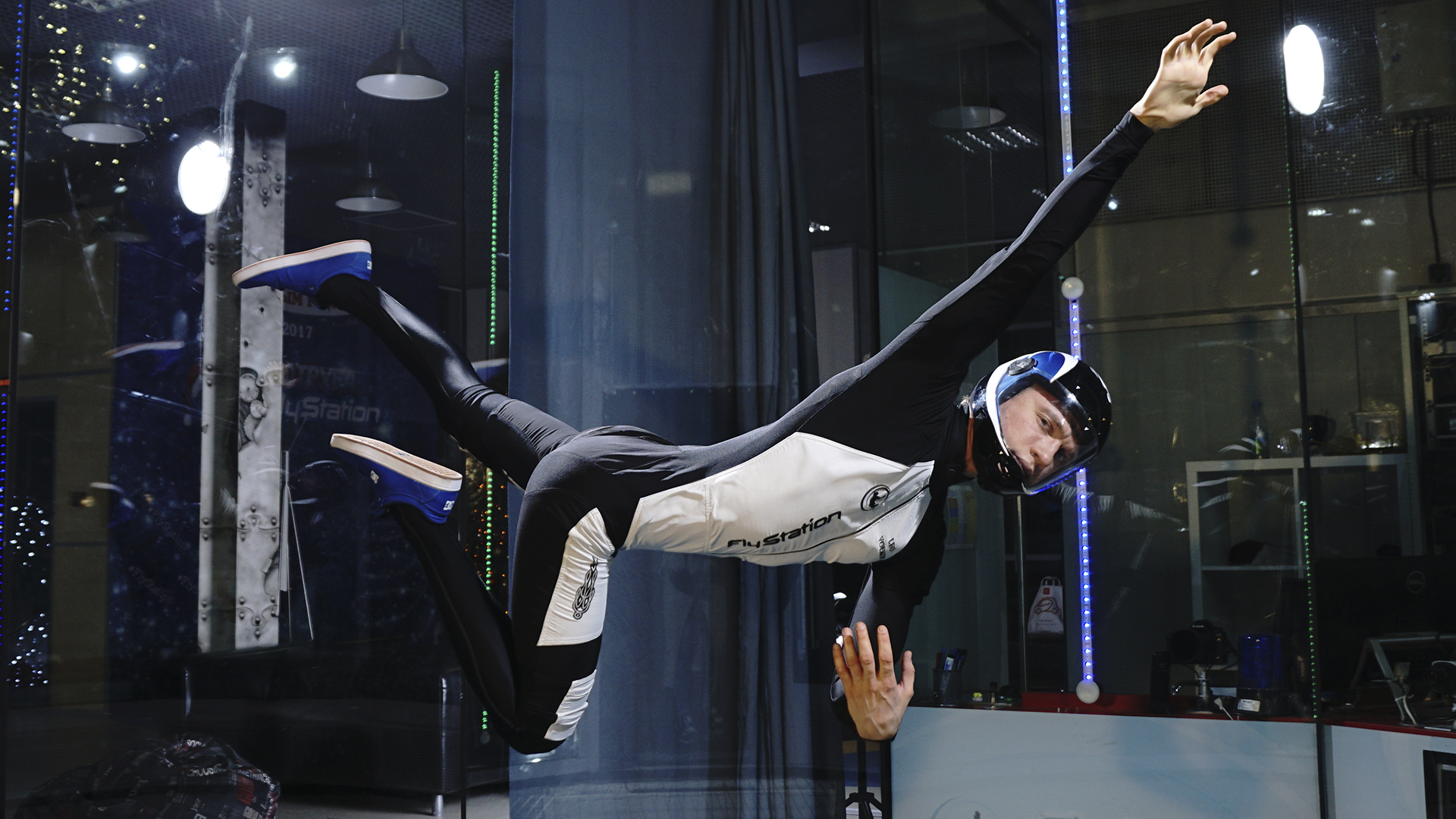
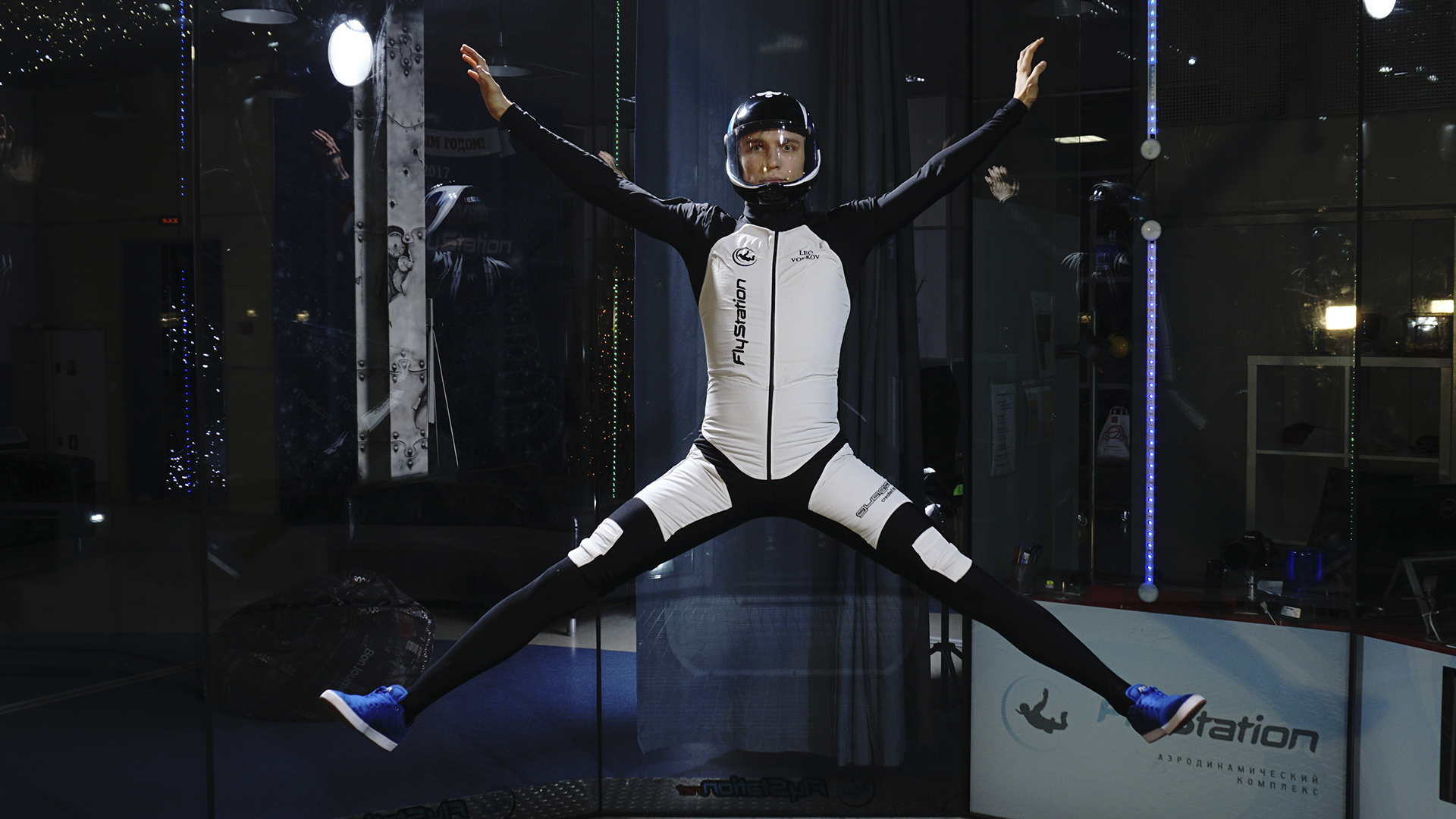
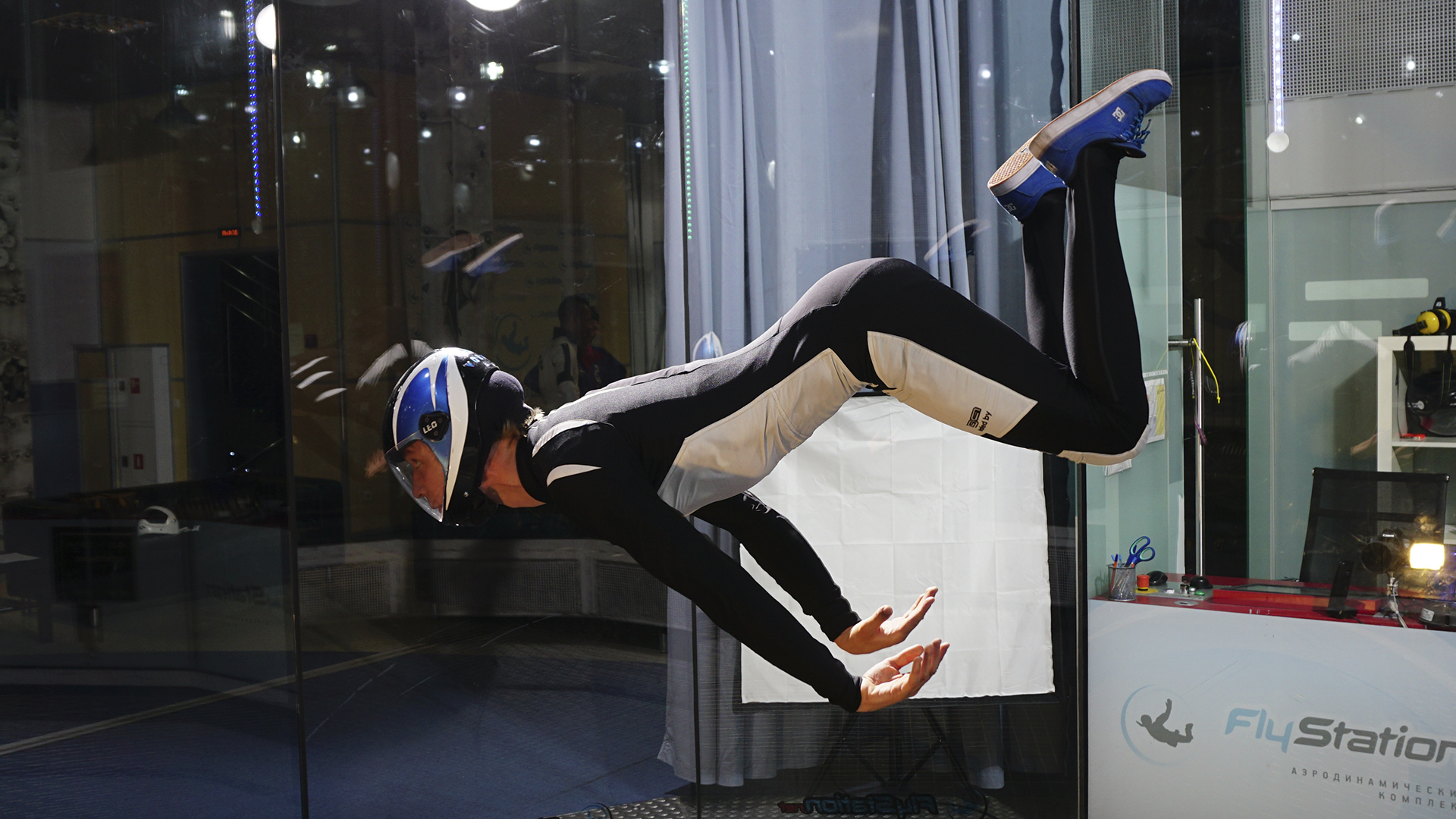
- Leo Volkov demonstrating bodyflight
- Highest governing body: Fédération Aéronautique Internationale
- Nicknames: Indoor Skydiving

Characteristics
- Mixed-sex: Yes
- Type: Skydiving
- Venue: Vertical wind tunnel

Presence
- Country or region: Worldwide (most popular in Europe and the United States)

Bodyflight, or body flight, is an air sport in which participants use the airflow generated by vertical wind tunnels to maintain flight.

== History ==
The first recorded bodyflight was by aeronautical engineer Jack Tiffany in 1964 at Wright-Patterson Air Force Base. Tiffany was testing parachutes for the Apollo program at the time, and decided to jump into the vertical wind tunnel being used for the testing. The first vertical wind tunnel designed specifically for bodyflight was built in 1978 by Aerodium Technologies near Montreal, Canada. Since then, vertical wind tunnels designed for bodyflight have significantly improved in safety, efficiency, and usability.

A variety of bodyflight competitions have been formed in recent decades, including the WindGames, the World Indoor Skydiving Championships, the Flyspot Polish Open, and more. In recent years, bodyflight has been paired with music during freestyle performances, which routinely go viral with millions of views on social media platforms.

== Methodology ==
Bodyflight is accomplished by using ones body surface as a means of manipulating the high-velocity airflow of the vertical wind tunnel and achieving controlled flight. Flyers use their hands, arms, legs, feet, torso, and even head as fins or rudders in order to increase or decrease drag and move in different directions. Flyers combine this with rolls, kicks, twists, and turns to create bodyflight routines. Larger flyers, while slower at rolling and twisting, are able to utilize more surface area and move faster than smaller flyers. Bodyflight is a physically strenuous sport and requires the development of infrequently used muscles.

Music has become an important aspect of freestyle bodyflight for both entertainment and synchronization purposes. Flyers are able to pair their moves with the music as an method of tracking the progress of their routine.

Due to both the high financial and physical costs of bodyflight, many flyers train in other sports such as gymnastics, martial arts, dancing, and trampolining.
