= Vertical wind tunnel =

Wind tunnel which moves air up in a vertical column

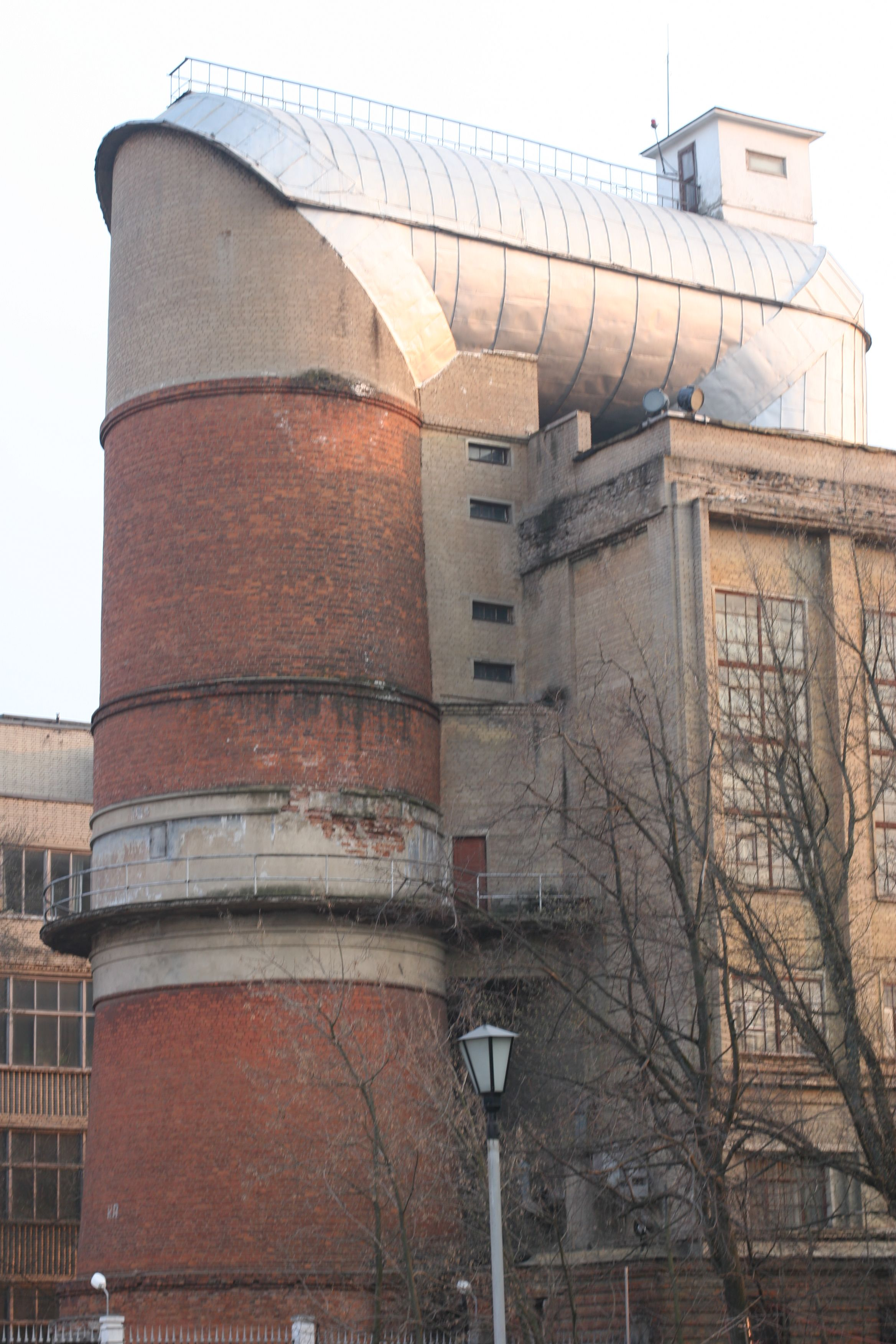
Research vertical wind tunnel at TsAGI.

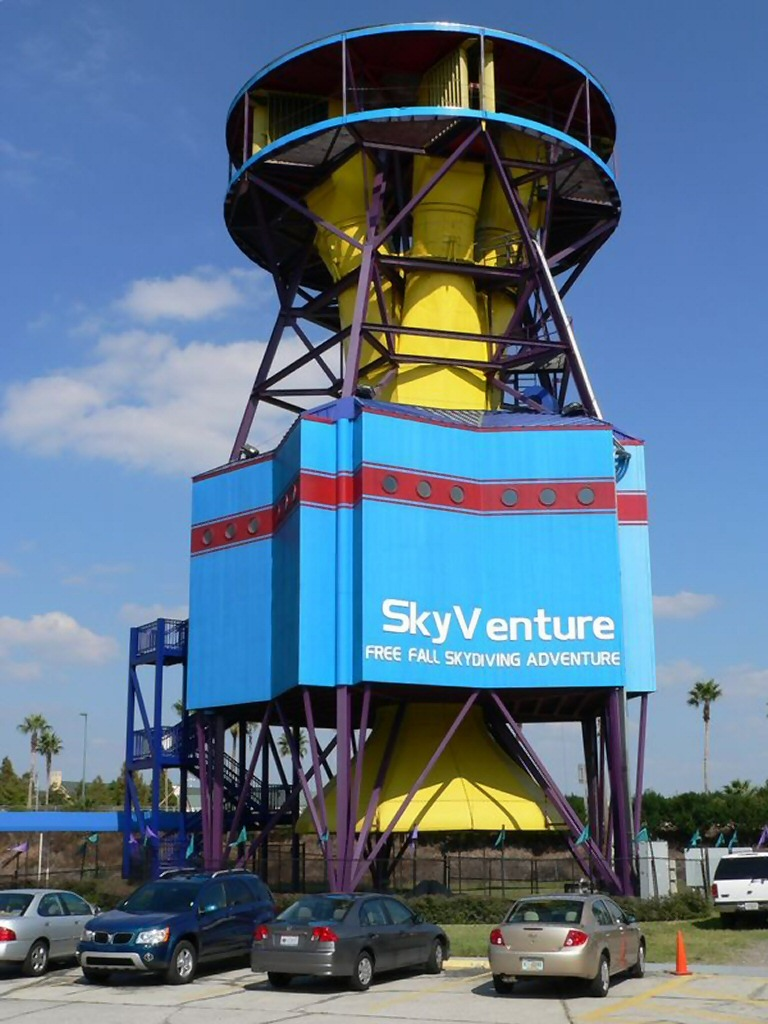
Non-recirculating indoor recreational vertical wind tunnel.

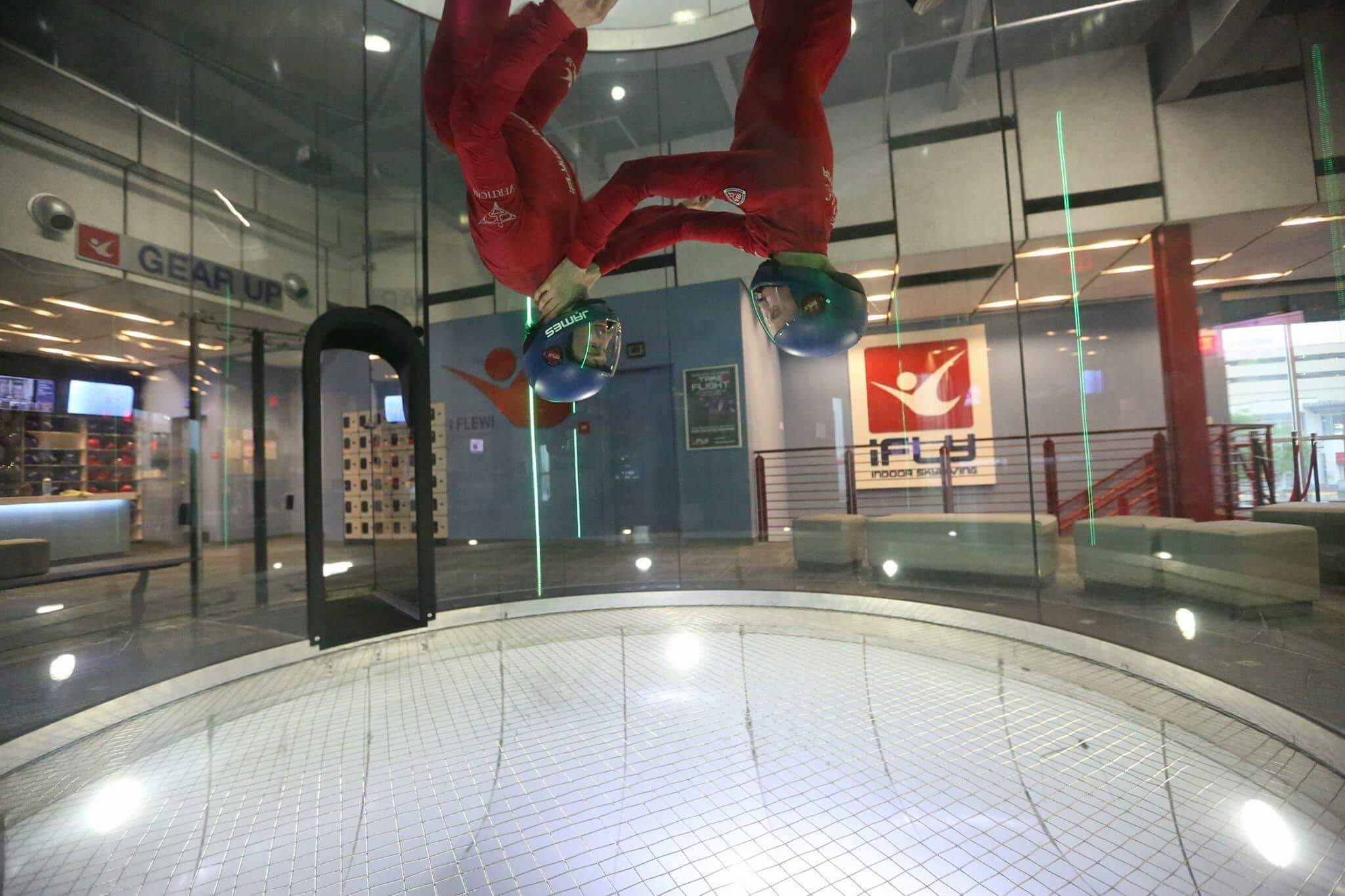
Two instructors practice flying inside an indoor wind tunnel

A vertical wind tunnel (VWT) is a wind tunnel that moves air up in a vertical column. Unlike standard wind tunnels, which have test sections that are oriented horizontally, as experienced in level flight, a vertical orientation enables gravity to be countered by drag instead of lift, as experienced in an aircraft spin or by a skydiver at terminal velocity.

Although vertical wind tunnels have been built for aerodynamic research, the most high-profile are those used as recreational wind tunnels, frequently advertised as indoor skydiving or bodyflight, which have also become a popular training tool for skydivers.

== Recreational vertical wind tunnels ==
A recreational wind tunnel enables human beings to experience the sensation of flight without planes or parachutes, through the force of wind being generated vertically. Air moves upwards at approximately 195 km/h (120 mph or 55 m/s), the terminal velocity of a falling human body belly-downwards. A vertical wind tunnel is frequently called 'indoor skydiving' due to the popularity of vertical wind tunnels among skydivers, who report that the sensation is extremely similar to skydiving. The human body 'floats' in midair in a vertical wind tunnel, replicating the physics of 'body flight' or 'bodyflight' experienced during freefall.

=== History ===
The first recirculating Vertical Wind Tunnel [Building 27] was constructed during 1943-1945 at Wright Field [now Wright-Patterson Air Force Base (WPAFB), Dayton, Ohio]. The original purpose was to test parachute performance and aircraft spin characteristics. It also provides the military with a very safe and relatively inexpensive means of teaching basic free-fall [skydiving] techniques. The building is 75 feet high and 69 feet in diameter. The 16-foot variable pitch fan is turned by a 1,000 hp electric motor. The test section is a 16 sided polygon, 12 feet across and 15 feet high. The maximum velocity is 95 mph.[2,3] The first human to fly in the WPAFB vertical wind tunnel was Jack Tiffany in 1964."[4]

In 1982 Jean St-Germain, an inventor from Drummondville, Quebec, sold a vertical wind tunnel concept to both Les Thompson and Marvin Kratter, both of whom went on to build their own wind tunnels. Soon after, St Germain sold the franchising rights to Kratter for $1.5 million. Originally known as the "Aérodium", it was patented as the "Levitationarium" by Jean St. Germain in the USA in 1984 and 1994 under Patent Nos. 4,457,509 and 5,318,481, respectively.

The first reference, in print, to a Vertical Wind Tunnel specifically for parachuting was published in CANPARA (the Canadian Sport Parachuting Magazine) in 1979.

St. Germain then helped build two wind tunnels in America. The first vertical wind tunnel built intended purely for commercial use opened in the summer of 1982 in Las Vegas, Nevada. Later that same year, a second wind tunnel opened in Pigeon Forge, Tennessee. Both facilities opened and operated under the name of Flyaway Indoor Skydiving. In 2005 the 15-year Flyaway Manager Keith Fields purchased the Las Vegas facility and later renamed it "Vegas Indoor Skydiving".

In the 1990s William Kitchen, an inventor living in Orlando, FL filed patents for a vertical wind tunnel and founded the US Company "Sky Venture" in July 1998. This tunnel is specifically designed to simulate the free fall skydiving experience. Popularity grew quickly and the Orlando, FL site was visited by former U.S. President George H.W. Bush. After the initial location continued to rise in popularity, the rights were sold to Alan Metni, who divided the company into a manufacturing and distribution company (Sky Venture) and public experience company (iFly) which now operates or has licensed tunnels to over 100 locations around the world, including 5 cruise ships, with more in the works.

Another milestone in vertical wind tunnel history was 'Wind Machine' at the closing ceremonies of the 2006 Torino Winter Olympics. This was a custom-built unit by Aerodium (Latvia/Canada) for the closing ceremony. Many people had never seen a vertical wind tunnel before, and were fascinated by the flying humans with no wires.

A vertical wind tunnel performance in Moscow's Red Square was shown in 2009 during the presentation of logotype of Sochi 2014 Winter Olympics. In 2010, a vertical wind tunnel was shown at the Latvian exhibition of Expo 2010 in Shanghai, China.

=== Types ===
Outdoor vertical wind tunnels can either be portable or stationary. Portable vertical wind tunnels are often used in movies and demonstrations, and are often rented for large events such as conventions and state fairs. Portable units offer a dramatic effect for the flying person and the spectators, because there are no walls around the flight area. These vertical wind tunnels allow people to fly with a full or partial outdoor/sky view. Outdoor vertical wind tunnels may also have walls or netting around the wind column, to keep beginner tunnel flyers from falling out of the tunnel.

Stationary indoor vertical wind tunnels include recirculating and non-recirculating types. Non-recirculating vertical wind tunnels usually suck air through inlets near the bottom of the building, through the bodyflight area, and exhaust through the top of the building. Recirculating wind tunnels form an aerodynamic loop with turning vanes, similar to a scientific wind tunnel, but using a vertical loop with a bodyflight chamber within a vertical part of the loop. Recirculating wind tunnels are usually built in climates that are too cold for non-recirculating wind tunnels. The airflow of an indoor vertical wind tunnel is usually smoother and more controlled than that of an outdoor unit. Indoor tunnels are more temperature-controllable, so they are operated year-round even in cold climates.

Various propellers and fan types can be used as the mechanism to move air through a vertical wind tunnel. Motors can either be diesel-powered or electric-powered, and typically provide a vertical column of air between 6 and 16 feet wide. A control unit allows for air speed adjustment by a controller in constant view of the flyers. Wind speed can be adjusted at many vertical wind tunnels, usually between 130 and 300 km/h (80 and 185 mph, or 35 and 80 m/s), to accommodate the abilities of an individual and to compensate for variable body drag during advanced acrobatics.

=== Safety and market appeal ===
Indoor skydiving also appeals to the mass market audience that are afraid of heights, since in a vertical wind tunnel, one only floats a few meters above trampoline-type netting. Indoor vertical wind tunnels contain the person within a chamber through the use of walls. While wind tunnel flying is considered a low impact activity, it does exert some strain on the flier's back, neck, and shoulders. Therefore, people with shoulder dislocations or back/neck problems should check with a doctor first. While actual skydiving out of an aircraft is subject to age limitations which vary from country to country, and even from state to state in the US, bodyflying has no set lower or upper limits.

=== Competitions ===
A number of competitions based on indoor skydiving have emerged, such as the FAI World Cup of Indoor Skydiving, the Windoor Wind Games, Australian Nationals, Polish Nationals, and the US National Championships.
