= 2024 in air sports =

This article lists world & continental championships and other FAI-Sanctioned events in air sports for 2024.

- Full 2024 FAI Calendar here.

== Aerobatics ==
=== World Championships ===
- July 31 – August 10: 2024 FAI World Glider Aerobatic Championships in (Germany) Oschatz
- August 17–24: 2024 FAI World Aerobatic Championships in (Poland) Zamość

=== Continental Championships ===
- September 5–14: 2024 FAI Open European Intermediate & Advanced Aerobatics Championships in (Romania) Clinceni

== Aeromodelling ==
=== World Championships ===
- March 23–26: 2024 FAI F1D World Championships for Indoor Model Aircraft in (Romania) Slanic Prahova
  - Results: here
- July 28 – August 4: 2024 FAI F3J World Championships for Model Gliders in (Norway) Elverum
- August 6–10: 2024 FAI F1ABP Junior World Championships for Free Flight Model Aircraft in (North Macedonia) Prilep
- August 10–17: 2024 FAI F4 World Championships for Scale Model Aircraft in (Romania) Strejnic
- August 12–17: 2024 FAI F2 World Championships for Control Line Model Aircraft in (United States) Muncie
- October 6–12: 2024 FAI FAI F3F World Championship for Model Gliders in (France) Limoux
- November 10–15: 2024 FAI F5B World Championship for Electric Model Aircraft in (United States) Maricopa

=== Continental Championships ===
- July 7–13: 2024 FAI F3K European Championships for Model Gliders in (Poland) Włocławek
- July 20–27: 2024 FAI F3A European Championship for Aerobatic Model Aircraft in (Belgium) Grandrieu
- July 22–26: 2024 FAI F1ABC European Championships for Free Flight Model Aircraft in (Romania) Simeria
- July 24–28: 2024 FAI F1ABCQ Asian-Oceanic Championships for Free Flight Model Aircraft in (Mongolia) Ulaanbaatar
- August 10–17: 2024 FAI F3CN European Championships for Model Helicopters in (Denmark) Aabenraa
- August 19–23: 2024 FAI F1E European Championship for Free Flight Slope Soaring Gliders in (Czech Republic) Litoměřice
- August 25–30: 2024 FAI F5J European Championship for Electric Powered Thermal Duration Gliders in (Romania) Deva

=== World Cup Events ===
- February 10–12: 2024 KIWI WORLD CUP OF NEW ZEALAND in (New Zealand) Lost Hills
  - Results: here
- February 14: 2024 NORTH AMERICAN CUP in (Canada) Lost Hills
  - Results: here
- February 15–19: 2024 BOB WHITE MEMORIAL MAX MEN INTERNATIONAL in (United States) Lost Hills
  - Results: here
- March 1–3: 2024 ARIZONA CUP in (United States) Tucson
  - Website: here
- March 8–11: 2024 F3A Masters World Cup in (Australia) Albury
  - Website: here
- March 8–10: 2024 Moose Cup & 2024 Bear Cup in (Finland) Säkylä
  - Results: here
- March 16: 2024 SPZG Cup, Antoon van Eldik Memorial in (Poland) Kietrz
  - Results: here
- March 17: 2024 Jasna 31 - Cup Pieter de Boer Memorial in (Poland) Kietrz
  - Results: here
- March 21–22: 2024 World Cup Memorial OTTO HINTS F1D in (Romania) Slanic Prahova
  - Website: here
- March 22–24: 2024 Raná OPEN in (Czech Republic) Raná
  - Results: here
- March 23–24: 2024 33rd Herend Cup in (Hungary) Tapolca
  - Website: here
- March 23–24: 2024 LARISA F5J MEETING in (Greece) Larissa
  - Website: here
- April 6–7: 2024 F5J Tisza Cup in (Hungary) Szeged
- April 6–7: 2024 Coppa VOLI F3K World Cup in (Italy) Rivalta di Torino
- April 6–7: 2024 Memorial 'Adriano GHISELLI' in (Italy) Capannori
- April 13: 2024 Otto-Kuttler-Cup in (Germany) Oberkotzau
- April 14: 2024 Föhrlberg-Cup in (Germany) Oberkotzau
- April 19–21: 2024 Slovenia F3F CUP in Vipava
- April 20–21: 2024 Coppa VOLI F5J in (Italy) Rivalta di Torino
- April 21–23: 2024 Widgiewa Cup in (Australia) Narrandera
- April 22–23: 2024 AFFS Championships in (Australia) Narrandera
- April 24–25: 2024 Southern Cross Cup in (Australia) Narrandera
- April 26–28: 2024 Donaupokal F3F in (Austria) Hainburg an der Donau
- April 27–28: 2024 Mecsek Cup in (Hungary) Pécs
- April 27–28: 2024 World Cup for Space models KASPICHAN in (Bulgaria) Kaspichan
- April 27–28: 2024 F5J BULGARIA CUP in (Bulgaria) Dupnitsa
- April 27–28: 2024 19. Kirchheim Open in (Germany) Kirchheim unter Teck
- April 27–28: 2024 INTERNATIONAL HAND LAUNCH GLIDER FESTIVAL in (United States) Poway
- April 27–28: 2024 10 th International Modena Trophy in (Italy) Modena

=== FAI Sanctioned Events ===
- January 28: 2024 F1N Acropolis Cup in Athens
  - Results: F1N Greece Facebook page
- February 17–18: 2024 SOIM Swiss Open Indoor Masters in Switzerland
  - Website: here
- March 9: 2024 F1N Kutina Open International in (Croatia) Kutina
  - Website: here
- March 23: 2024 Medzinárodné majstrovstvá Slovenska F1N in (Slovakia) Dubnica nad Váhom
  - Website: here
- April 6: 2024 IX Backa Indoor Open in (Serbia) Sombor
- April 27–28: 2024 Gliderkeeper F5J Masters Escalona in (Spain) Escalona del Prado

== Ballooning ==
=== World Championships ===
- September 8–14: 2024 FAI World Hot Air Balloon Championship in (Hungary) Szeged
- September 12–21: 2024 Coupe Aéronautique Gordon Bennett in (Germany) Münster

== Canopy piloting ==
=== World Championships ===
- August 31– September 1: 2024 FAI World Canopy Formation Championships in (Czech Republic) Prostějov
- September 19–24: 2024 FAI World Canopy Piloting Championships & 2024 FAI World Canopy Piloting Freestyle Championships in (South Africa) Pretoria

=== FAI Sanctioned Events ===
- March 23–24: 2024 United States Canopy Piloting Association Meet #1 in Zephyrhills
  - Results: here
- April 20–21: 2024 United States Canopy Piloting Association Meet #2 in Sebastian

== Drone sports ==
=== Drone racing ===
==== World Championships ====
- October 31 – November 3: 2024 FAI World Drone Racing Championship in (China) Hangzhou

==== FAI Drone Racing World Cup ====
- February 16–18: KPIHAB FAI Drone Racing World Cup in (Philippines) Capas
- May 11 & 12: Aircrasher FAI World Cup in (Germany) Aichtal
- May 18 & 19: Paris Drone Racing World Cup in (France) La Queue-en-Brie
- June 1 & 2: FAI Korea Drone Racing World Cup in (South Korea) Seoul
- June 7–9: Drone Racing World Cup Hungary in Mogyoród
- June 22 & 23: Trofeo F9U World Cup Italia in (Italy) Sumirago
- July 20 & 21: Drone Club Varna Cup in (Bulgaria) Varna
- July 27 & 28: DX Racing Serbia in Bela Crkva
- September 14 & 15: Phoenix Drone Racing in (North Macedonia) Prilep
- September 20 & 21: Gaelic GP in (Spain) Madrid
- September 28 & 29: Türkiye Drone Race in (Turkey) Istanbul
- October 4–6: Namwon World Drone Racing Masters in (South Korea) Namwon
- October 24–27: ASFC F9U World Cup Chongqing in (China) Chongqing
- November 14–16: Riyadh Drone Racing World Cup in (Saudi Arabia) Riyadh

=== Drone soccer ===
==== FAI Sanctioned Events ====
- February 2–4: 2024 German Drone Ball Cup (Germany) Hannover

== Gliding ==
=== World Championships ===
- July 13–27: 2024 FAI Junior World Gliding Championships & 2024 FAI World 13,5M Class Gliding Championship in (Poland) Ostrów Wielkopolski
- August 14 – September 1: 2024 FAI World Gliding Championships in (United States) Uvalde

=== Continental Championships ===
- June 2–15: 2024 FAI Pan-American Gliding Championship in (United States) Hutchinson
- August 3–17: 2024 FAI European Gliding Championships in (Czech Republic) Tábor

=== FAI Sanctioned Events ===
- April 27–30: 2024 RM Amlikon in (Switzerland) Amlikon Airfield
- April 28 – May 4: 2024 Alföldi Cup in (Hungary) Szatymaz

== Hang gliding ==
=== FAI Sanctioned Events ===
- January 6–13: 1st Corryong HG Cup 2024 in (Australia) Corryong
  - Results: Open, Floater
- January 6–8: 2024NishifujiJC in (Japan) Fujinomiya
  - Results: here
- January 16–23: 1st Forbes Flatlands Hang Gliding Championships 2024 in (Australia) Forbes
  - Results: here
- January 25 – February 3: 46th New Zealand Hang Gliding Open Championship in Murchison
  - Results: here
- February 11–17: 1st NSW HANG GLIDING STATE TITLES 2024 in (Australia) Manilla
  - Website: here
- March 16–17: 1st 2024 KOREA HANG GLIDING LEAGUE 1st ROUND ( 2024 KHL 1R ) in (South Korea) Hadong-gun
  - Results: here
- March 19–24: 12th Aeros Winter Race 2024 in (Slovenia) Vipava
  - Results: here
- March 20–24: 2024 Itajiki Spring Flight in (Japan) Ishioka
  - Results: here
- March 24–31: 40th XL Open Internacional Sierra de Cádiz 2024 in (Spain) Cádiz
  - Results: here
- March 23 – April 1: Trofeo Montegrappa Deltaplano 2024 in (Italy) Romano d'Ezzelino
  - Website: here
- March 29 – April 1: 2024 Birchip 2024 Flatter than the Flatlands in (Australia) Birchip
- April 5–7: 2024 East Japan Championship in Ishioka
- April 7–13: 1st Dalby Big Air 2024 in (Australia) Dalby Airport
- April 20–23: 4th IV Open Internacional Mudejar 2024 in (Spain) El Pobo
- April 20–27: Campeonato Brasileiro Asa Delta - 1ª Etapa in (Brazil) Pico do Gavião
- April 20–27: 2024 Paradise Airsports Nationals in (United States) Groveland
- April 25–30: 2024 VALCOMINO TROPHY - ITALIAN OPEN 2024 in (Italy) San Donato Val di Comino
- April 27 – May 1: Open Laragne - Saint André 2024 in (France) Laragne-Montéglin
- April 28 – May 4: 2024 Icarus Cup at Wilotree Park in (United States) Groveland
- April 30 – May 5: Czech Highlands 2024 in (Czech Republic) Raná

== Parachuting ==
=== World Championships ===
- July 2–13: 2024 CISM World Military Parachuting Championship in (Hungary) Szolnok
- August 31– September 1: 2024 FAI World Style and Accuracy Landing Championships & 2024 FAI Junior World Style and Accuracy Landing Championships in (Czech Republic) Prostějov

=== FAI Sanctioned Events ===
- March 15–17: 2024 Parachute-Ski World Cup Series in (Austria) St. Johann in Tirol
  - Website: here
- April 27–28: 2024 Dolomiti Cup in (Italy) Belluno

== Paragliding ==
=== World Championships ===
- August 18–31: 2024 FAI Junior World Paragliding Championships in (Slovenia) Tolmin

=== Continental Championships ===
- May 21 – June 1: 2024 FAI European Paragliding Championship in (Spain) Pegalajar
- June 6–16: 2024 FAI Asian-Oceanic Paragliding Championship in (South Korea) Mungyeong
- October 4–12: 2024 FAI European Paragliding Accuracy Championship in (Albania) Gjirokastër

=== FAI Sanctioned Events ===
- January 6–13: 1st SRS Ozone Edition, Colombia in Piedechinche
  - Results: here
- January 18–25: 20th OPEN FAI2 - COLOMBIANO PRIMERA VALIDA in (Colombia) Roldanillo
  - Results: here
- January 20–21: 1st 1ª ETAPA CAMP. GAÚCHO DE PARAPENTE 2024 - FAI 2 - SAPIRANGA - RS in (Brazil) Sapiranga
  - Results: here
- January 20–21: SUPER OPEN VIVA 2024 in (Brazil) Vila Valério
  - Results: here
- January 27 – February 3: 5th British Winter Open in (Colombia) Roldanillo
  - Results: here
- January 30 – February 4: Hawkes Bay Paragliding XC 2024 in (New Zealand) Havelock North
  - Results: here
- February 4–11: 2nd Niviuk Open Colombia 2024 in Roldanillo
  - Results: here
- February 5–13: New Zealand Paragliding Nationals 2024 in Rotorua
  - Results: here
- February 8–12: 8th Thailand Paragliding Accuracy ASEAN Friendships Open (FAI CAT II) - AFA Nation League 2024 in Nong Khai
  - Results: here
- February 10–16: 1st Bright Open 2024 PG in (Australia) Bright
  - Website: here
- February 10–13: 1st Campeonato Sul Brasileiro de Parapente 2024 - Etapa Única - FAI 2 - Sapiranga - RS in (Brazil) Sapiranga
  - Results: here
- February 10–13: 1st VALADARES PARAGLIDING CUP 2024 in (Brazil) Governador Valadares
  - Results: here
- February 12–18: 1st Panchgani Open and Indian Nationals - 2024 in (India) Panchgani
  - Results: here
- February 15–18: Paragliding Accuracy World Cup 2024 Nongkhai, Thailand in Nong Khai
  - Results: here
- February 17–18: 2nd 2ND STAGE OF THE CATARINESE PARAGLIDING CHAMPIONSHIP in (Brazil) Jaraguá do Sul
  - Results: here
- February 18–24: 1st Pre Pwc Corryong open 2024 in (Australia) Corryong
  - Results: here
- February 18–23: Open Trujillo 2024 in (Venezuela) Trujillo
  - Website: here
- February 23–26: 1st Winter Championship of Kazakhstan for landing accuracy in Taldykorgan
  - Results: here
- February 24–27: French League Zivernales de Gourdon in (France) Gourdon
  - Results: here (Event was cancelled)
- February 24–25: Swiss Cup flex in (Switzerland) Grindelwald
  - Website: here
- March 1–3: 1st 2024 Brazil Monjolo Open PG - 1th Capixaba in Baixo Guandu
  - Results: here
- March 5–16: 13th Paragliding World Cup SUPERFINAL 2023 - Brazil, Baixo Guandu in Baixo Guandu
  - Results: here
- March 15–17: Berati Open Air in (Albania) Berat
  - Results: here
- March 16–17: 1st BAPO 2024 in (Belgium) Grand Coo
  - Website: here
- March 19–26: Campeonato Binacional de Parapente 2024 in (Venezuela) San Joaquín de Navay
  - Results: here
- March 21–26: Flory Cup 2024 in (Italy) Marostica
  - Results: here
- March 22–24: 2024 Kontum Open - Vietnam League 2024 Round 2 in Kon Tum
  - Results: here
- March 22–24: 1st 2024 Korean Paragliding League 1st – Hapcheon in (South Korea) Hapcheon-gun
  - Results: here
- March 23–24: 3rd Stage of the Santa Catarina Paragliding Championship 2024 - Tangará in (Brazil) Tangará
  - Results: here
- March 27 – April 1: Trofeo Montegrappa Parapendio 2024 in (Italy) Romano d'Ezzelino
  - Website: here
- March 29 – April 1: Swiss League Open in (Switzerland) Verbier
  - Website: here
- March 29 – April 1: 10th Rana Cup 2024 in (Czech Republic) Raná
  - Website: here
- March 30–31: 1st 2024 Korean Paragliding League 1st – Hapcheon in (South Korea) Danyang
  - Results: here
- April 5–7: 4th OPEN PANCAS 2024 in (Brazil) Pancas
- April 5–7: 3rd XC Savinjska Open in (Slovenia) Braslovče
- April 5–7: Serbian National Championship Vrsac Open 2024. in (Serbia) Vršac
- April 6–7: 1a ETAPA CAMPEONATO PAULISTA DE PARAPENTE in (Brazil) São Sebastião da Bela Vista
- April 6–7: Zillertal Battle 2024 in (Austria) Mayrhofen
- April 9–14: Transcapixaba Hike and Fly in (Brazil) Pancas
- April 11–14: 5th Dobrča Open 2024 in (Slovenia) Begunje na Gorenjskem
- April 12–14: 2024 Liga Nacional Open Teba in (Spain) Teba
- April 13–14: Swiss Cup Biel in (Switzerland) Biel
- April 13–14: Schöckl Pokal, Styrian Championship 2024 in (Austria) Sankt Radegund bei Graz
- April 13–20: 2024 Brazilian Nationals 1st - Castelo - Pre PWC in (Brazil) Castelo
- April 18–21: Staufen Cup 2024 BaWü Open und Vorarlberger Landesmeisterschaft 2024 im Gleitschirmfliegen in (Austria) Bezau
- April 18–21: 2024 Norma Race 2024 in (Italy) Norma
- April 18–21: Vrsac Open 2024 in (Serbia) Vršac
- April 19–21: Acc Rana League 2024 in (Czech Republic) Raná
- April 19–21: Akdeniz Bölgesi Hedef Yarismasi in (Turkey) Alanya
- April 19–21: 1st Event Name: 2024 Korea Sports Class League 1st – Hapcheon in (South Korea) Hapcheon-gun
- April 20–28: 5th Freedom Open 2024 in (Italy) Bordano
- April 20: 2024 Etyeki Húzogatós 2024 in (Hungary) Etyek
- April 25–28: 10th PGAWC ALANYA 2024 in (Turkey) Alanya
- April 26–28: 4th 1ra copa Amistad Xocomil - Panajachel 2024 in (Guatemala) Panajachel
- April 26–28: 9th 1ª Etapa do CICO - Jandaia 2024 in (Brazil) Rampa de jandaia
- April 27 – May 1: 2024 Pre-PWC - Liga Nacional Algodonales in (Spain) Algodonales
- April 27–30: Alpen Cup 2024 in (Germany) Lenggries
- April 27–28: 1 Etapa Campeonato Paranaense 2024 - Tomazina in (Brazil) Tomazina

== Paramotoring ==
=== World & Continental Championships ===
- February 6–10: 2024 FAI World Paramotor Slalom Championships in (Qatar) Doha
  - Overall PF1 winner: (Poland) Bartosz Nowicki
  - Women PF1 winner: (France) Morgane Planton
  - Teams PF1 winners: France
  - Overall PL1 winner: (Qatar) Hayan Al-Hebabi
  - Teams PL1 winners: France
- July 27 – August 3: 2024 FAI World Microlight Championships in (United Kingdom) Deenethorpe
- August 3–10: 2024 FAI World Paramotor Endurance Championships in (United Kingdom) Manston

== Skydiving ==
=== World Championships ===
- April 16–20: 2024 FAI World Cup of Indoor Skydiving in Macau
- October 5–11: 2024 FAI World Artistic Events Championships in (United States) Beaufort
- October 5–11: 2024 FAI World Formation Skydiving Championships in (United States) Beaufort
- October 5–11: 2024 FAI World Speed Skydiving Championships in (United States) Beaufort

=== Continental Championships ===
- April 16–20: 2024 FAI Asian Indoor Skydiving Championships in Macau
- April 16–20: 2024 FAI European Indoor Skydiving Championships in Macau

== Wingsuit flying ==
=== World Championships ===
- October 5–11: 2024 FAI World Wingsuit Flying Championships in (United States) Beaufort
