= Fastest propeller-driven aircraft =

A number of aircraft have been claimed to be the fastest propeller-driven aircraft. This article presents the current record holders for several sub-classes of propeller-driven aircraft that hold recognized, documented speed records in level flight. Fédération Aéronautique Internationale (FAI) records are the basis for this article. Other contenders and their claims are discussed, but only those made under controlled conditions and measured by outside observers.

Pilots during World War II sometimes claimed to have reached supersonic speeds in propeller-driven fighters during emergency dives, but these speeds are not included as FAI accepted records. They are also extremely unlikely, due to the complex aerodynamic problems of propeller driven aircraft approaching the speed of sound.

Also not formally accepted by the FAI, which was not present due to wartime conditions, are speeds recorded in a dive during high-speed tests with the Supermarine Spitfire, including Squadron Leader J.R. Tobin's 606 mph (975 km/h) in a 45° dive in a Mark XI Spitfire (date unknown) and Squadron Leader Anthony F. Martindale's breaking 620 mph (1,000 km/h) (Mach 0.92) in the same aircraft in April 1944. However, while not FAI certified, the results from Martindale's flight are more than claims. The Royal Aircraft Establishment was a scientific body with the capability to record such events. Martindale's aircraft was fully instrumented with calibrated equipment and had an observation camera recording the flight instruments. Other recording instruments were also fitted. The aircraft lost its propeller and reduction gearbox and was substantially damaged during the test but Martindale managed to successfully land the aircraft, so the data could be recovered and post flight calculations verified the readings.

Flight Lieutenant Edward Powles' 690 mph (1,110 km/h) in a photo-reconnaissance Spitfire PR.XIX PS852 during an emergency dive while carrying out spying flights over China on 5 February 1952 is also discounted. This would otherwise be the highest speed ever recorded for a piston-engined aircraft.

== Propeller versus jet propulsion ==
High-bypass turbofan. The front fan is an enclosed propeller providing air thrust while the turbine behind provides exhaust thrust.

Aircraft that use propellers as their prime propulsion device constitute a historically important subset of aircraft, despite inherent limitations to their speed. Aircraft powered by piston engines get virtually all of their thrust from the propeller driven by the engine. A few piston engined aircraft derive some thrust from the engine's exhaust gases, and there are certain hybrid types like the Motorjet that use a piston engine to drive the compressor of a jet engine, which supplies the primary thrust (although some types also have a propeller powered by the piston engine for low speed efficiency). All aircraft prior to World War II (except for a tiny number of early jet aircraft and rocket aircraft) used piston engines to drive propellers, so all Flight airspeed records prior to 1944 were necessarily set by propeller-driven aircraft. Rapid advances in first liquid-fueled rocket engine-powered aircraft – with a 1,004 km/h (624 mph) record set in October 1941 by a German example — and axial-flow jet engine technology during World War II meant that no propeller-driven aircraft would ever again hold an absolute air speed record. Shock wave formation in propeller-driven aircraft at speeds near sonic conditions, impose limits not encountered in jet aircraft.

Jet engines, particularly turbojets, are a type of gas turbine configured such that most of the work available results from the thrust of the hot exhaust gases. Turbofans, both the high-bypass versions used in all modern commercial jetliners, and the low-bypass versions in most modern military aircraft, produce a combination of jet thrust from the exhaust of burnt fuel, and air thrust from what amounts to an internal propeller. High-bypass turbofan engines achieve most of their thrust from a fan driving air backwards through the engine casing, and driven by a gas turbine, which also contributes jet thrust via its exhaust. The two are in one large engine casing with the fan (propeller) at the front and the jet engine behind, with both turbine exhaust and fan-driven air exiting the rear of the engine casing. Turboprop engines are similar, but use an external propeller rather than an internal fan (propeller) inside an engine casing. The hot exhaust gas from a turboprop engine gives a small amount of thrust, however the propeller is the main source of thrust.

== Turboprops ==
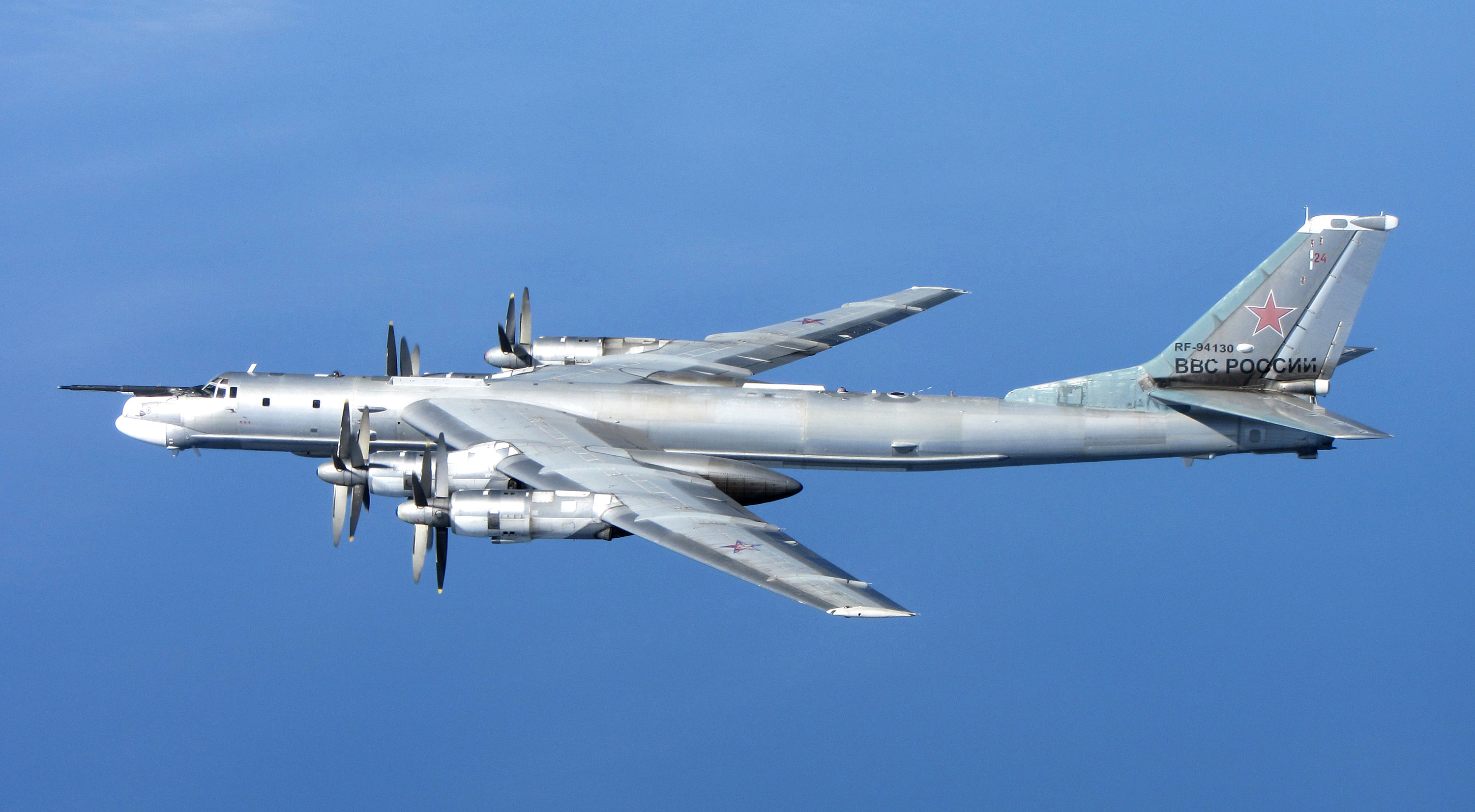
Tupolev Tu-95

The Guinness Book of World Records lists the Soviet Tupolev Tu-95 bomber and its derivatives (Tu-114 and Tu-142) as "the fastest propeller-driven aircraft in standard production form", with a maximum cruise speed of 925 km/h (575 mph; 499 kn) or Mach 0.82.

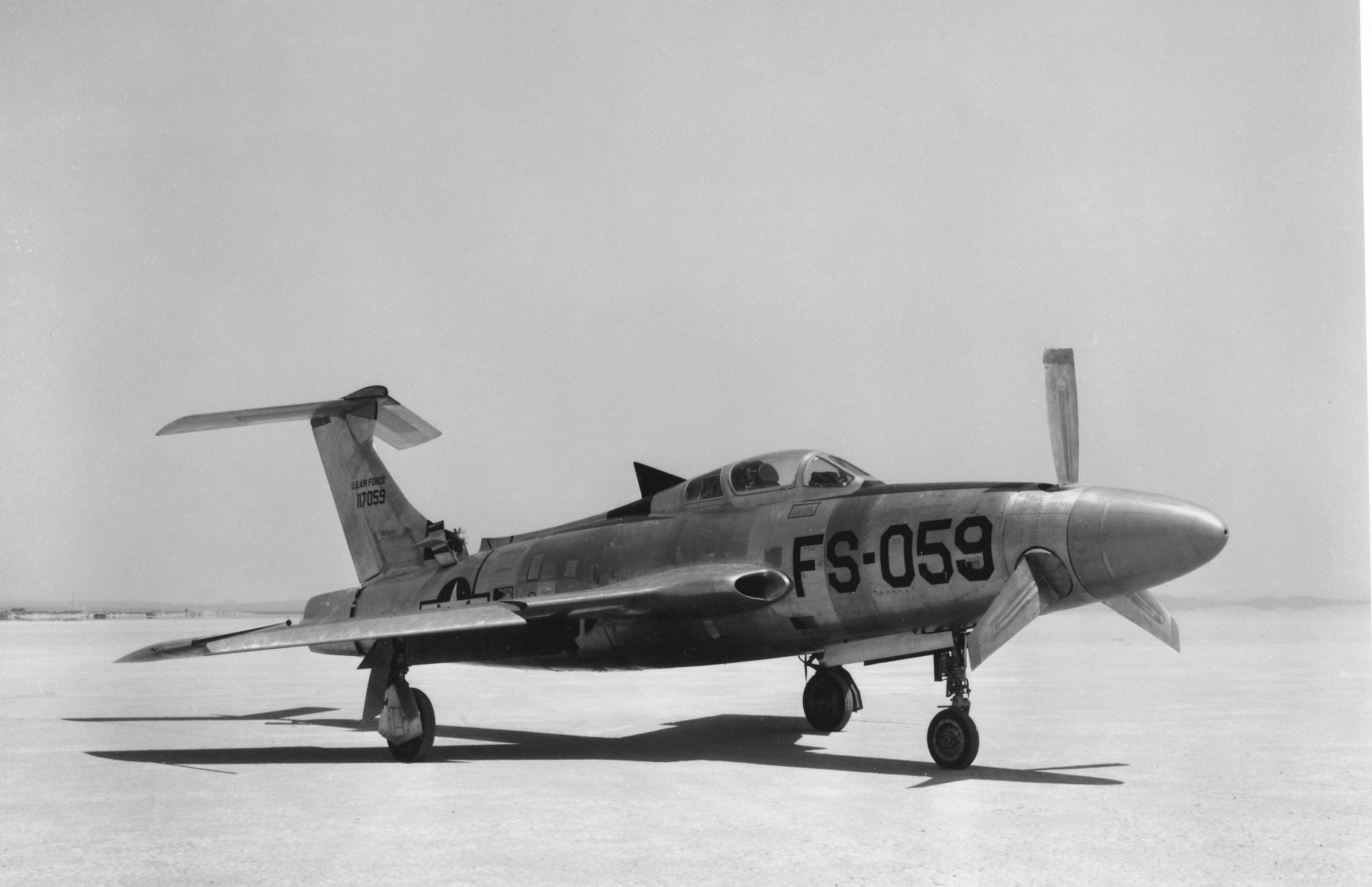
XF-84H "Thunderscreech"

Even earlier, in 1997, the Guinness Book of World Records listed the Republic XF-84H Thunderscreech experimental USAF fighter as the fastest propeller-driven aircraft, with a speed of 1,003 km/h (623 mph; 542 kn) or Mach 0.83. While it may have been designed as the fastest propeller-driven aircraft, this goal was never realized due to severe stability problems. This record speed is also inconsistent with data from the National Museum of the United States Air Force, which gives a top speed of "only" 840 km/h (520 mph; 450 kn) or Mach 0.70.

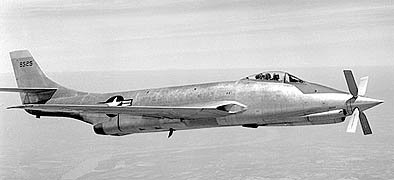
McDonnell XF-88B

Overall, probably the fastest aircraft ever equipped with (but not driven exclusively by) an operating propeller was the experimental McDonnell XF-88B, which is a variant of the jet-powered McDonnell XF-88 Voodoo made by installing the Allison T38 turboprop engine in its nose while retaining its original turbojet engines. This unusual aircraft was intended to explore the use of propellers in high-speed flight and, when operating in conjunction with the turbojet engines, has achieved speeds of approximately Mach 0.90 in level flight. In a dive, it has achieved supersonic speeds, up to slightly above Mach 1.

== Piston engines ==
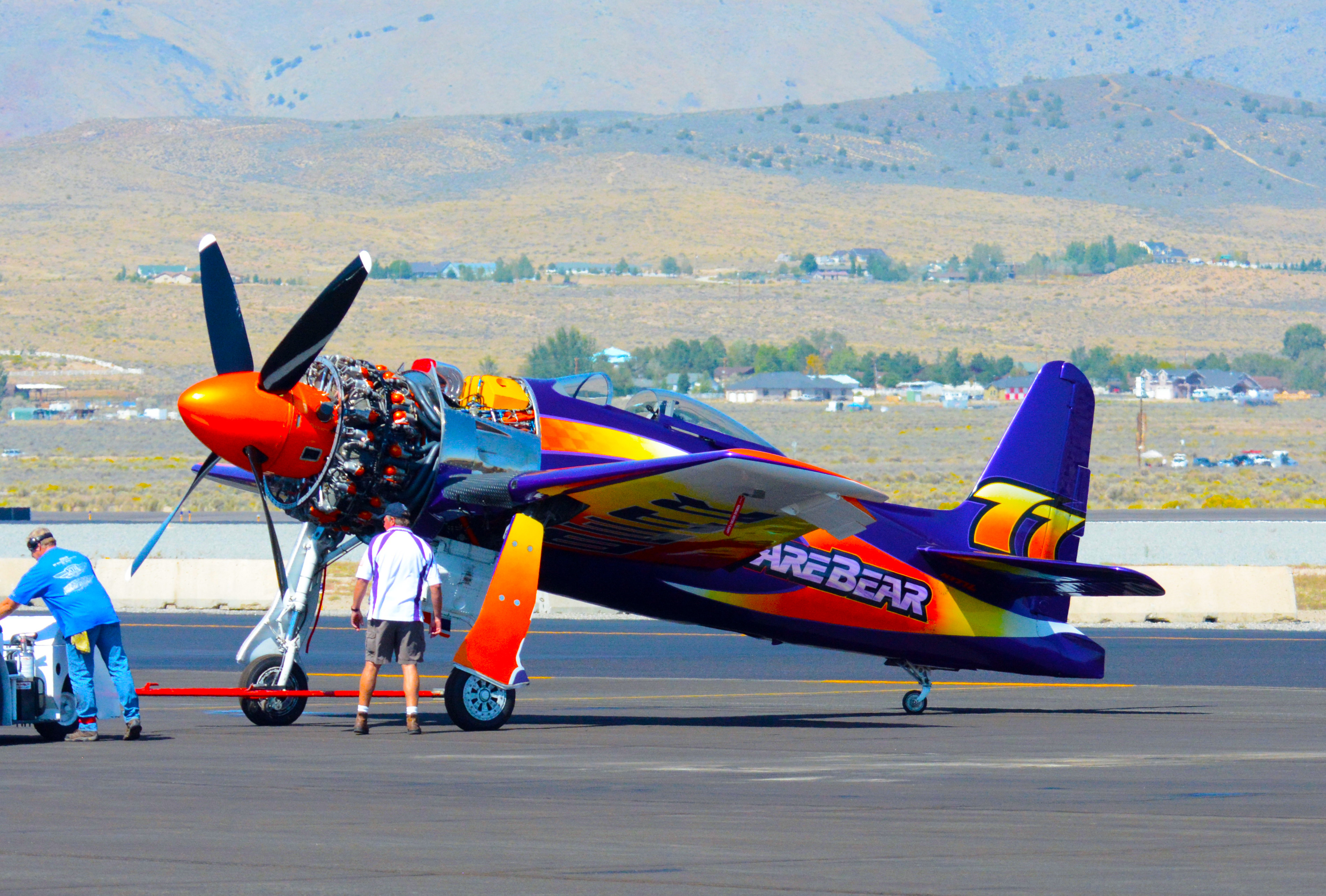
77 Grumman F8F-2 Bearcat (N-777L) Rare Bear world speed record holder at the 2014 Reno Air Races

The more "traditional" class of propeller-driven aircraft comprises those powered by piston engines, which include nearly all aircraft from the Wright brothers up through World War II. Today piston engines are used almost exclusively on light, general aviation aircraft. The official speed record for a piston plane was held by a modified Grumman F8F Bearcat, the Rare Bear, with a speed of 528.315 mph (850.241 km/h) on 21 August 1989 at Reno, Nevada, United States of America. This record was retired as a new weight class based system was introduced to allow more pilots to set new records across a wider range of aircraft. On September 2, 2017, Steve Hinton Jr, in the modified North American P-51 Mustang Voodoo set the new record of 531.53 mph (855.41 km/h) in the C-1e class (the same weight class Rare Bear would fall into). This record is also the fastest for any propeller driven piston aircraft.

== Electric ==
Rolls-Royce Accel Spirit of Innovation piloted by Steve Jones broke the official electric plane speed record by flying at an average speed of 555.9km/h (345.4 mph) over a 3km course on 19 Nov 2021.

== Other claimants ==
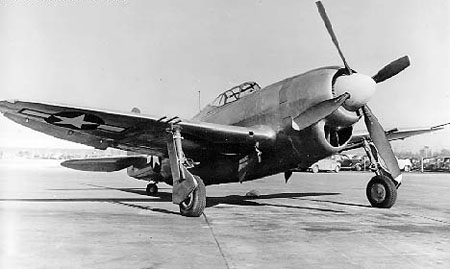
The Republic XP-47J reached 504 mph (811 km/h) in testing

The first ever record although not verified, was the 1903 Wright Flyer. It achieved 30 mph (48 km/h) during its first flight, a record by the only plane of controlled take-off and landing in existence. The Bleriot XI then reached 47 mph (76 km/h) in 1909. Fabric-covered biplanes of the World War I era and shortly after could reach 200 mph (320 km/h). In 1925 U.S. Army Lt. Cyrus K. Bettis flying a Curtiss R3C won the Pulitzer Trophy Race with a speed of 248.9 mph (400.6 km/h).

Speeds of all-metal monoplanes of the 1930s jumped to 440.6 mph (709.1 km/h) with the Macchi M.C.72 floatplane. The Messerschmitt Me 209 V1 set a world speed record of almost 756 km/h (470 mph) on 26 April 1939, and the Republic XP-47J (a variant of the P-47 Thunderbolt) is claimed to have reached 504 mph (811 km/h). A North American P-51H Mustang managed 487 mph (784 km/h). A prototype Republic XP-72, designed as a successor to the P-47, managed 490 mph (790 km/h). The prototype of the twin-engined de Havilland Hornet (RR915) (383 built) reached 485 mph (781 km/h) as did a prototype Hawker Fury monoplane when fitted with a Napier Sabre VII, and a conversion of one of the prototypes of the Supermarine Spiteful, (planned successor to the Supermarine Spitfire) reached 494 mph (795 km/h). The fastest German propeller-driven aircraft that flew in WWII (but which did not see combat) was the twin-DB 603-powered Dornier Do 335 Pfeil ("Arrow") which had a claimed top speed of 474 mph (763 km/h).

In the 1950s two turboprop tailsitter fighter prototypes were designed for the US Navy, the Convair XFY "Pogo" (610 mph (980 km/h)) and the Lockheed XFV (580 mph (930 km/h)), but both had less powerful engines than intended and conflicting demands of vertical and horizontal flight further compromised flight speeds so they never got close to these numbers.

== See also ==
- Flight airspeed record
- List of vehicle speed records
- Transcontinental flight
- List of slowest fixed-wing aircraft
