= List of flight airspeed records =

Highest speed obtained from an air vehicle

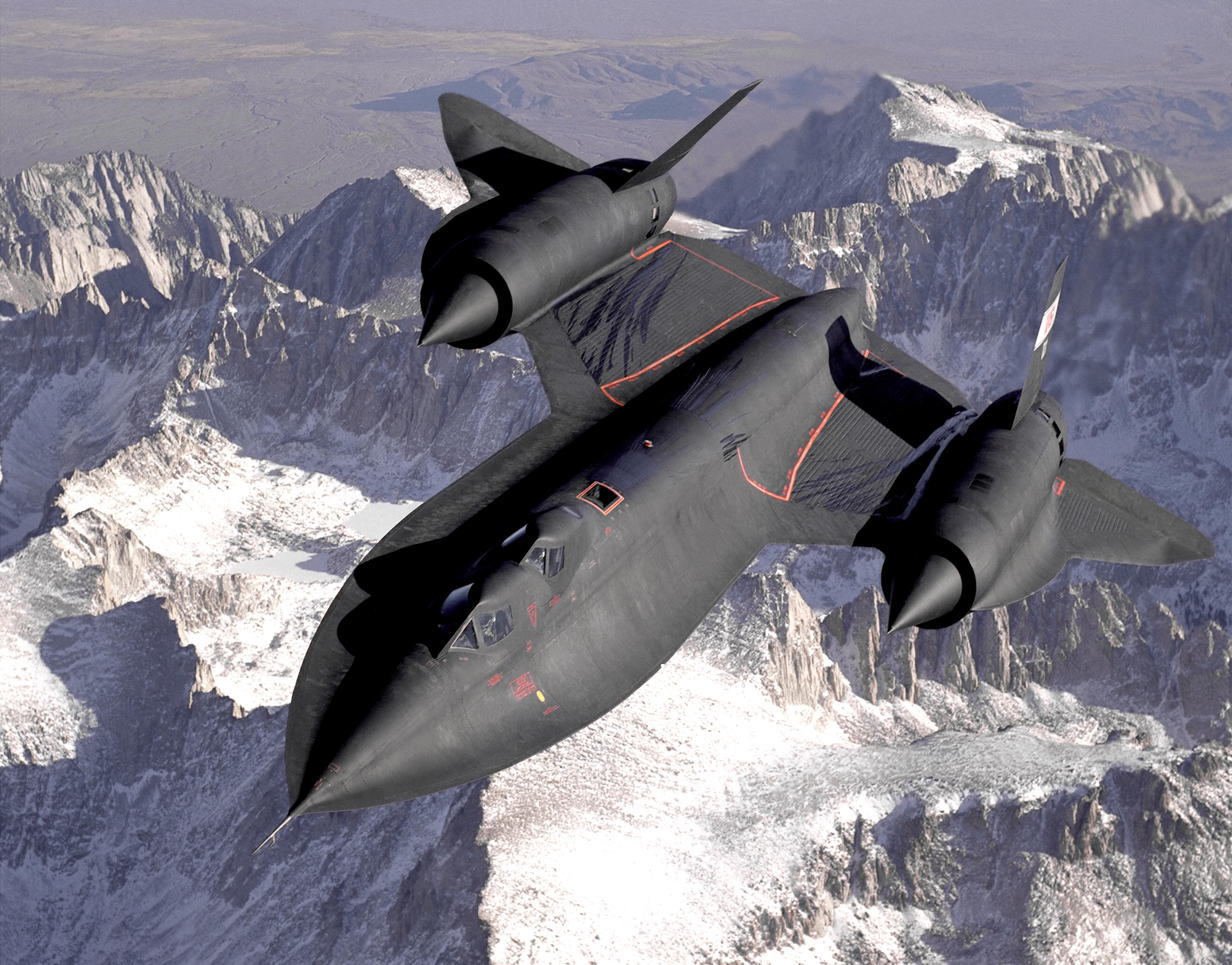
The Lockheed SR-71 Blackbird has held the record for crewed airbreathing jet aircraft since 1976.

An air speed record is the highest airspeed attained by an aircraft of a particular class. The rules for all official aviation records are defined by Fédération Aéronautique Internationale (FAI), which also ratifies any claims. Speed records are divided into a number of classes with sub-divisions. There are three classes of aircraft: landplanes, seaplanes, and amphibians, and within these classes there are records for aircraft in a number of weight categories. There are still further subdivisions for piston-engined, turbojet, turboprop, and rocket-engined aircraft. Within each of these groups, records are defined for speed over a straight course and for closed circuits of various sizes carrying various payloads.

== Timeline ==
Flight speed records over time, taken from the table below.

Gray text indicates unofficial records, including unconfirmed or unpublicized war secrets.

Date	Pilot	Airspeed			Location	Notes
Date	Pilot	mph	km/h	Aircraft	Location	Notes
17 December 1903	(United States) Wilbur Wright	6.82	10.98	Wright Flyer	Kitty Hawk, North Carolina, US	This figure is ground speed, not airspeed. The Wrights' first flight covered just over 120 ft (40 m) and about 12 seconds into a gusty wind. The Wrights estimated airspeed at 31 mph (50 km/h).
5 October 1904	(United States) Wilbur Wright	37.85	60.23	Wright Flyer III	Huffman Prairie, Ohio, US	
12 November 1906	(Brazil) Alberto Santos-Dumont	25.65	41.292	Santos-Dumont 14-bis	Bagatelle Castle, Paris, France	First officially recognized airspeed record.
26 October 1907	(France) Henri Farman	32.73	52.700	Voisin-Farman I	Issy-les-Moulineaux, France	
25 May 1909	(France) Paul Tissandier	34.04	54.810	Wright Model A	Pau, France	
23 August 1909	(United States) Glenn Curtiss	44.367	69.821	Curtiss No. 2	Reims, France	1909 Gordon Bennett Cup.
24 August 1909	(France) Louis Blériot	46.160	74.318	Blériot XI	Reims, France	
28 August 1909	(France) Louis Blériot	47.823	76.995	Blériot XI	Reims, France	
23 April 1910	(France) Hubert Latham	48.186	77.579	Antoinette VII	Nice, France	
10 July 1910	(France) Léon Morane	66.154	106.508	Blériot	Reims, France	
29 October 1910	(France) Alfred Leblanc	68.171	109.756	Blériot XI	New York, New York, US	
12 April 1911	(France) Alfred Leblanc	69.442	111.801	Blériot	Pau, France	
11 May 1911	(France) Édouard Nieuport	73.385	119.760	Nieuport IIN	Châlons, France	
12 June 1911	(France) Alfred Leblanc	77.640	125.000	Blériot		
16 June 1911	(France) Édouard Nieuport	80.781	130.057	Nieuport IIN	Châlons, France	
21 June 1911	(France) Édouard Nieuport	82.693	133.136	Nieuport IIN	Châlons, France	
13 January 1912	(France) Jules Védrines	87.68	145.161	Deperdussin Monocoque	Pau, France	
22 February 1912	(France) Jules Védrines	100.18	161.290	Deperdussin Monocoque	Pau, France	
29 February 1912	(France) Jules Védrines	100.90	162.454	Deperdussin Monocoque	Pau, France	
1 March 1912	(France) Jules Védrines	103.62	166.821	Deperdussin Monocoque	Pau, France	
2 March 1912	(France) Jules Védrines	104.29	167.910	Deperdussin Monocoque	Pau, France	
13 July 1912	(France) Jules Védrines	106.07	170.777	Deperdussin Monocoque	Reims, France	
9 September 1912	(France) Jules Védrines	108.14	174.100	Deperdussin Monocoque	Chicago, Illinois, US	
17 June 1913	(France) Maurice Prévost	111.69	179.820	Deperdussin Monocoque	Reims, France	
27 September 1913	(France) Maurice Prévost	119.19	191.897	Deperdussin Monocoque	Reims, France	
29 September 1913	(France) Maurice Prévost	126.61	203.850	Deperdussin Monocoque	Reims, France	
1914	(United Kingdom) Norman Spratt	134.5	216.5	Royal Aircraft Factory S.E.4		Unofficial
August 1918	(United States) Roland Rohlfs	163	262.3	Curtiss Wasp		Not officially recognised.
1919	(France) Joseph Sadi-Lecointe	191.1	307.5	Nieuport-Delage NiD 29V		Not officially recognised.
7 February 1920	(France) Joseph Sadi-Lecointe	171.0	275.264	Nieuport-Delage NiD 29V	Villacoublay, France.	First official record post World War 1.
28 February 1920	(France) Jean Casale	176.1	283.464	SPAD S.20bis	Villacoublay, France.	
9 October 1920	(France) Bernard de Romanet	181.8	292.682	SPAD S.20bis	Buc, France	
10 October 1920	(France) Joseph Sadi-Lecointe	184.3	296.694	Nieuport-Delage NiD 29V	Buc, France	
20 October 1920	(France) Joseph Sadi-Lecointe	187.9	302.529	Nieuport-Delage NiD 29V	Villacoublay, France	
4 November 1920	(France) Bernard de Romanet	191.9	309.012	SPAD S.XX	Buc, France	
12 December 1920	(France) Joseph Sadi-Lecointe	194.4	313.043	Nieuport-Delage NiD 29V	Villacoublay, France	
26 September 1921	(France) Joseph Sadi-Lecointe	205.2	330.275	Nieuport-Delage Sesquiplan	Ville Sauvage, France	
13 October 1922	(United States) Billy Mitchell	222.88	358.836	Curtiss R	Detroit, Michigan, US	
18 October 1922	(United States) Billy Mitchell	224.28	360.93	Curtiss R-6	Selfridge Field, Detroit, Michigan, US	
15 February 1923	(France) Joseph Sadi-Lecointe	232.91	375.00	Nieuport-Delage NiD 42S	Istres, France	
29 March 1923	(United States) 1st Lt. Russell L. Maughan	236.587	380.74	Curtiss R-6	Wright Field, Dayton, Ohio, US	
2 November 1923	(United States) Lt. Harold J. Brow	259.16	417.07	Curtiss R2C-1	Mineola, New York, US	
4 November 1923	(United States) Lt. Alford J. Williams	266.59	429.02	Curtiss R2C-1	Mineola, New York, US	
11 November 1924	(France) Florentin Bonnet	278.37	448.171	Bernard-Ferbois V.2		
4 November 1927	(Kingdom of Italy) Mario de Bernardi	297.70	479.290	Macchi M.52 seaplane	Venice, Italy	Database ID 11828
30 March 1928	(Kingdom of Italy) Mario de Bernardi	318.620	512.776	Macchi M.52bis seaplane	Venice, Italy	Database ID 11827
August 1929	(Kingdom of Italy) Giuseppe Motta	362.0	582.6	Macchi M.67 seaplane		Unofficial
10 September 1929	(United Kingdom) George H. Stainforth	336.3	541.4	Gloster VI seaplane	Calshot, UK	Database ID 11829
12 September 1929	(United Kingdom) Augustus Orlebar	357.7	575.5	Supermarine S.6 seaplane	Calshot, UK	Database ID 11830
13 September 1931	(United Kingdom) George H. Stainforth	407.5	655.8	Supermarine S.6 seaplane	Lee-on-the-Solent, UK	Database ID 11831
10 April 1933	(Kingdom of Italy) Francesco Agello	423.6	682.078	Macchi M.C.72 seaplane	Desenzano del Garda, Italy	Database ID 11836
23 October 1934	(Kingdom of Italy) Francesco Agello	440.5	709.209	Macchi M.C.72 seaplane	Desenzano del Garda, Italy	Database ID 4497, current piston-engined seaplane speed record.
13 September 1935	(United States) Howard Hughes	354.4	567.12	Hughes H-1 Racer	Santa Ana, California, US	FAI Database ID 8748
11 November 1937	(Nazi Germany) Dr. Hermann Wurster	379.63	610.95	Messerschmitt Bf 109 V.13	Augsburg, Germany	FAI Database ID 8747
30 March 1939	(Nazi Germany) Hans Dieterle	466.6	746.60	Heinkel He 100 V8	Oranienburg, Germany	FAI Database ID 8744
26 April 1939	(Nazi Germany) Fritz Wendel	469.220	755.138	Messerschmitt Me 209 V1	Augsburg, Germany	Piston-engined record until 1969
2 October 1941	(Nazi Germany) Heini Dittmar	623.65	1,003.67	Messerschmitt Me 163A "V4"	Peenemünde-West, Germany	Rocket powered – World War II secret, not an official FAI record but over the 3 km (1.9 mi) FAI distance
1944	(Nazi Germany) Heinz Herlitzius	624	1,004	Messerschmitt Me 262 S2	Leipheim, Germany	World War II secret, not an official FAI record. Steep dive.
6 July 1944	(Nazi Germany) Heini Dittmar	702	1,130	Messerschmitt Me 163B "V18"	Lagerlechfeld, Germany	Rocket powered – World War II secret, not an official FAI record. Dive, details unknown.
7 November 1945	(United Kingdom) H. J. Wilson	606.4	975.9	Gloster Meteor F Mk.4	Herne Bay, UK	EE454 Britannia, first official record post World War II.
7 September 1946	(United Kingdom) Edward Mortlock Donaldson	615.78	990.79	Gloster Meteor F Mk.4	Littlehampton, UK	EE530, a long-span Mk 4.
19 June 1947	(United States) Col. Albert Boyd	623.74	1,003.60	Lockheed P-80R Shooting Star	Muroc (Edwards AFB), California, US	
20 August 1947	(United States) Cmdr. Turner Caldwell	640.663	1,031.049	Douglas D-558-1 Skystreak	Muroc (Edwards AFB), California, US	First record flight to exceed secret October 1941 Me 163A V4 figure
25 August 1947	(United States) Major Marion Eugene Carl USMC	650.796	1,047.356	Douglas D-558-1 Skystreak	Muroc (Edwards AFB), California, US	
14 October 1947	(United States) Chuck Yeager	670.0	1,078	Bell X-1 (flight #50)	Muroc, California, US	Rocket powered – Cold War secret, not an official FAI C-1 record
6 November 1947	(United States) Chuck Yeager	891.0	1,434	Bell X-1 (flight #58)	Muroc, California, US	Rocket powered – Cold War secret, not an official FAI C-1 record, first to exceed secret July 1944 Me 163B V18 record
15 September 1948	(United States) Maj. Richard L. Johnson, USAF	670.84	1,079.6	North American F-86A-3 Sabre	Cleveland, Ohio, US	
18 November 1952	(United States) J. Slade Nash	698.505	1,124.13	North American F-86D Sabre	Salton Sea, California, US	
16 July 1953	(United States) William Barnes	715.745	1,151.88	North American F-86D Sabre	Salton Sea, California, US	
7 September 1953	(United Kingdom) Neville Duke	727.6	1,171	Hawker Hunter Mk.3	Littlehampton, UK	
26 September 1953	(United Kingdom) Mike Lithgow	735.7	1,184	Supermarine Swift F4	Castel Idris, Tripoli, Libya	
3 October 1953	(United States) James B. Verdin, US Navy	752.9	1,211.5	Douglas F4D Skyray	Salton Sea, California, US	
29 October 1953	(United States) Frank K. Everest USAF	755.1	1,215.3	North American F-100 Super Sabre	Salton Sea, California, US	
20 August 1955	(United States) Horace A. Hanes	822.1	1,323	North American F-100C Super Sabre	Palmdale, California, US	
10 March 1956	(United Kingdom) Peter Twiss	1,132	1,822	Fairey Delta 2	Chichester, UK	
12 December 1957	(United States) USAF	1,207.6	1,943.5	McDonnell F-101A Voodoo	Muroc, California, US	
16 May 1958	(United States) Capt. Walt Wayne Irwin, USF	1,404.012	2,259.538	Lockheed YF-104A Starfighter	Muroc, California, US	
5 October 1959	(France) Maj. André Turcat	1,441.6	2,320	Nord 1500 Griffon	France	
31 October 1959	(Soviet Union) Col. Georgi Mosolov	1,484	2,388	Mikoyan-Gurevich Ye-6/3 or Ye-66	USSR	
15 December 1959	(United States) Maj. Joseph Rogers, USAF	1,525.9	2,455.7	Convair F-106 Delta Dart	Muroc, California, US	The record should have gone to civilian (former military) pilot Charles Myers, who flew a Delta Dart at 2,485 kilometres per hour (1,544 mph) in 1959, but Cold War pressures dictated that the award go to an active-military pilot.
22 November 1961	(United States) Robert B. Robinson, US Navy	1,606.3	2,585.1	McDonnell-Douglas F4H-1F Phantom II	Muroc, California, US	
7 July 1962	(Soviet Union) Col. Georgi Mosolov	1,665.9	2,681	Mikoyan Gurevich Ye-166	USSR	Name adopted for record attempt, a version of a Ye-152 a.k.a. E-166.
1 May 1965	(United States) Robert L. Stephens and Daniel Andre	2,070.1	3,331.5	Lockheed YF-12A	Muroc, California, US	
28 July 1976	(United States) Capt. Eldon W. Joersz (P) and Maj. George T. Morgan Jr. (RSO)	2,193.2	3,529.6	Lockheed SR-71 Blackbird #61-7958	Beale AFB, US	

== Official records versus unofficial ==
The Lockheed SR-71 Blackbird holds the official air speed record for a crewed airbreathing jet engine aircraft with a speed of 3,529.6 km/h (2,193.2 mph). The record was set on 28 July 1976 by Eldon W. Joersz and George T. Morgan Jr. near Beale Air Force Base, California, USA. It was able to take off and land unassisted on conventional runways. SR-71 pilot Brian Shul claimed in The Untouchables that he flew faster than Mach 3.5 on 15 April 1986, over Libya, in order to avoid a missile.

The official record for fastest piston-engined aeroplane in level flight was held by a Grumman F8F Bearcat, the Rare Bear, with a speed of 850.23 km/h (528.31 mph). The unofficial record is held by a British Hawker Sea Fury at 880 km/h (547 mph). Both were demilitarised and modified fighters. The fastest stock (original, factory-built) piston-engined aeroplane was unofficially the Supermarine Spiteful F Mk 16, which "achieved a speed of 494m.p.h. at 28,500ft during official tests at Boscombe Down" in level flight. The unofficial record for fastest piston-engined aeroplane (not in level flight) is held by a Supermarine Spitfire Mk.XIX flown by Flight Lieutenant Edward "Ted" Powles, which was calculated to have achieved a speed of 1,110 km/h (690 mph) in a dive on 5 February 1952.

The last new speed record ratified before World War II was set on 26 April 1939 with a Me 209 V1, at 755 km/h (469 mph). The chaos and secrecy of the war meant that new speed breakthroughs were neither publicized nor ratified. In October 1941, an unofficial speed record of 1,004 km/h (624 mph) was secretly set by a Messerschmitt Me 163A "V4" rocket aircraft. Continued research during the war extended the secret, unofficial speed record to 1,130 km/h (700 mph) by July 1944, achieved by a Messerschmitt Me 163B "V18". The first new official record in the post-war period was achieved by a Gloster Meteor F Mk.4 in November 1945, at 975 km/h (606 mph). The first aircraft to exceed the unofficial October 1941 record of the Me 163A V4 was the Douglas D-558-1 Skystreak, which achieved 1,032 km/h (641 mph) in August 1947. The July 1944 unofficial record of the Me 163B V18 was officially surpassed in November 1947, when Chuck Yeager flew the Bell X-1 to 1,434 km/h (891 mph).

The official speed record for a seaplane powered by a piston engine is 709.209 km/h (440.682 mph), which was attained on 24 October 1934, by Francesco Agello in the Macchi-Castoldi M.C.72 seaplane ("idrocorsa") and it remains the current record. It was equipped with the Fiat AS.6 engine (version 1934) developing a power of 2,300 kW (3,100 hp) at 3,300 rpm, with coaxial counter-rotating propellers. The original record holding aircraft is on display at the Italian Air Force Museum, located on the former Vigna di Valle Air Base in Bracciano near Rome.

== Other air speed records ==
Date	Pilot	Airspeed		Aircraft	Comments
Date	Pilot	mph	km/h	Aircraft	Comments
2 October 1985	Holger Rochelt	27.54	44.32	Musculair 2	Fastest human-powered aircraft
22 December 2006	Klaus Ohlmann & Matias Garcia Mazzaro	190.6	306.8	Schempp-Hirth Nimbus-4DM	Fastest (non-powered) glider over 500 km
11 August 1986	Trevor Egginton	249	400.87	Westland Lynx	Fastest helicopter
31 December 1988	L.P. Krantov	258.8	415	Tupolev Tu-134A	Highest landing speed for a civil aircraft
11 June 2013	Hervé Jammayrac	293	472	Eurocopter X3	Fastest propeller compound helicopter
15 September 2010	Kevin Bredenbeck	299	481	Sikorsky X2	Fastest compound helicopter, shallow dive (unofficial)
19 March 1989	Unknown pilot	316	509	Bell Boeing V-22 Osprey	Tiltrotor
15 April 1969	Unknown pilot	316	509	Bell 533	Compound jet helicopter
19 November 2021	Steve Jones	345.4	555.9	Rolls-Royce Accel ‘Spirit of Innovation’	Fastest electric-only aeroplane
11 Dec 2025	Luke Maximo Bell	408.6	657.6	Peregreen 4	Fastest electric flight
6 February 2003	Joseph J. Ritchie, Steve Fossett	576.3	927.4	Piaggio P.180 Avanti	Fastest propeller-driven aircraft of any type
2 September 2017	Steve Hinton Jr.	531.53	855.41	P-51 "Voodoo"	Fastest straight-line piston-engined aircraft in level flight
9 April 1960	Ivan Sukhomlin, Konstantin Sapielkine	545.07	877.21	Tupolev Tu-114	Fastest propeller-driven airliner-size aircraft, per FAI Both Tu-116 and Tu-142 claim higher maximum speeds.
5 February 1952	Flight Lieutenant Edward Powles	690	1,110.4	Supermarine Spitfire PR.XIX PS852	Reached (Mach 0.96) during an emergency dive while carrying out spying flights over China, the highest speed ever recorded for a piston-engined aircraft (though not in level flight)
14 October 2012	Felix Baumgartner	844	1,358	None (jumped from a helium balloon gondola)	Fastest unpowered descent of a human
7 February 1996	Captain Leslie Scott	1,249	2,010	Concorde	Fastest passenger plane on a regular route
3 October 1967	William 'Pete' Knight	4,519	7,274	North American X-15	Rocket plane
16 November 2004	Uncrewed	6,755	10,870	NASA X-43A	Air-launched hypersonic scramjet; fastest free-flying air-breathing vehicle
22 April 2010	Uncrewed	13,201	21,245	HTV-2 Falcon	Air-launched hypersonic glider; fastest uncrewed aerial vehicle
14 November 1981	Joe H. Engle	17,540	28,228	Space Shuttle Columbia	Fastest manually controlled flight in atmosphere during atmospheric reentry of STS-2 mission

Flying between any two airports allow a large number of combinations, so setting a speed record ("speed over a recognised course") is fairly easy with an ordinary aircraft, although there are many administrative requirements for recognition.

== See also ==
- Flight altitude record
- Fastest propeller-driven aircraft
- List of vehicle speed records
- Lockheed X-7 - Mach 4.31 (2,881 mph) in the 1950s
- Messerschmitt Me 163 Komet
- World record
