= Chinese Grand Prix (disambiguation) =

Chinese Grand Prix is a Formula One motor race.

Chinese Grand Prix may also refer to:

- Chinese motorcycle Grand Prix
- One of the FAI World Grand Prix aerobatics competitions
- Chinese Taipei Open Grand Prix Gold badminton championship
