= Mosolov =

Mosolov (Russian: Мосолов) is a Russian surname. It may refer to:

- Alexander Mosolov (1900 - 1973), Soviet composer.
- Georgy Mosolov (1926 - 2018), Soviet Russian test pilot.
