= Albanian Air Sports Federation =

Governing body of air sports in Albania

- Federata Shqiptare e Aeronautikës
- Sport: Air sports
- Jurisdiction: Albania
- Founded: 2010
- Affiliation: FAI
- Headquarters: Tirana
- President: Renis Tershana

Official website
- albanianairsports.com
- (Albania)

Albanian Air Sport Federation (Albanian: Federata Shqiptare e Aeronautikës) is the governing body for the sport of Air sports in Albania and member of the Fédération Aéronautique Internationale (FAI).It was founded in 2010 in Tirana.

== Membership ==
Current members who are part of the Albanian Air Sports Federation:

- National AeroClub of Albania (Aeronautika Shqiptare)
- Aeroclub of Durres
- Aeroclub of Tirana
- Aeroclub of Gjirokastra
- Aircadet Albania
- Albanian Aeromodeling
