= Air sports =

Range of aerial activities

Air Sports
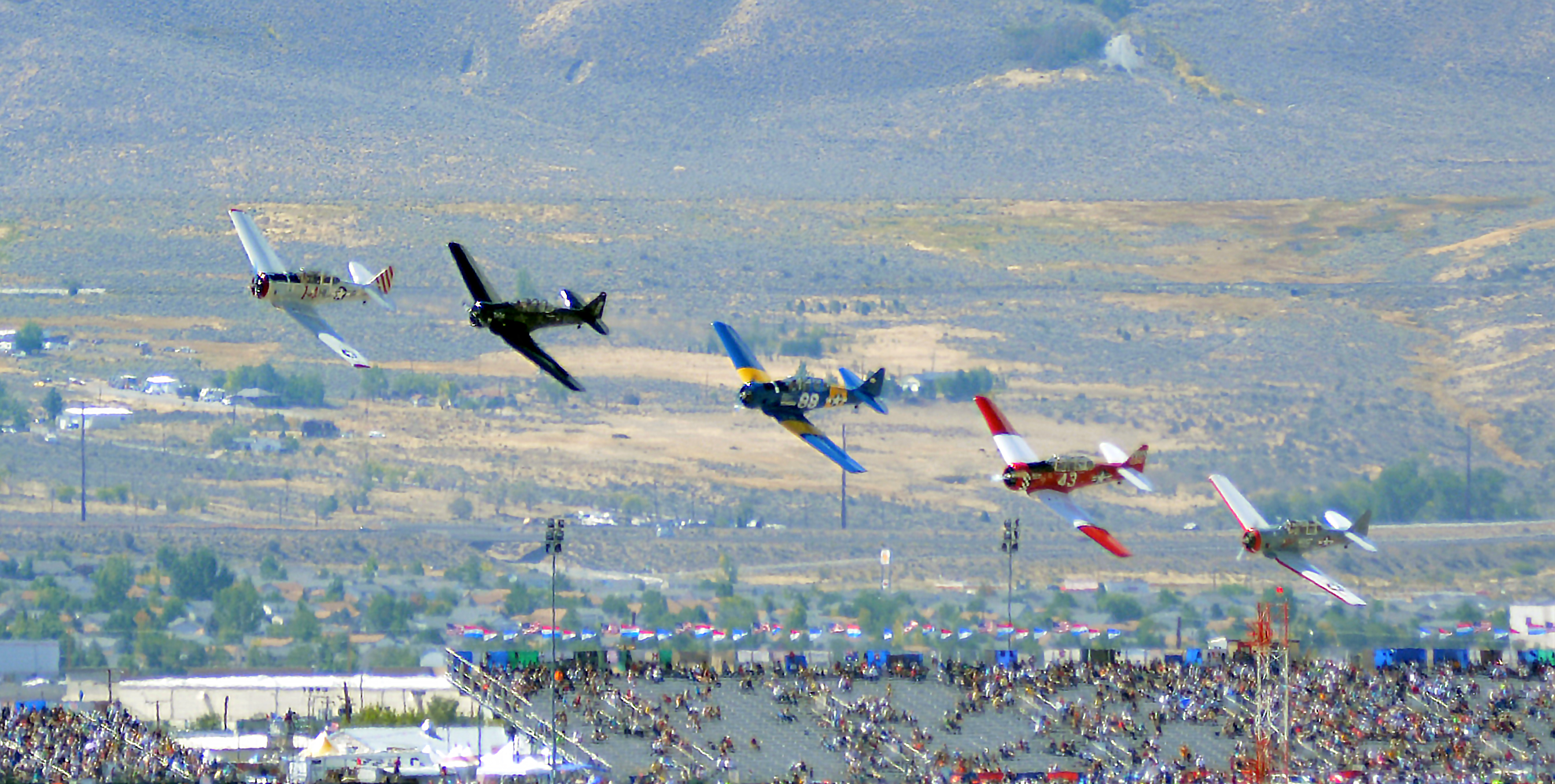
- T-6 Gold Start passing the finish pylon at the 2014 Reno Air Races
- Highest governing body: Fédération Aéronautique Internationale

Characteristics
- Contact: No
- Mixed-sex: Yes
- Type: Outdoor recreation

Presence
- Country or region: Worldwide
- Olympic: No
- Paralympic: No
- World Games: 1997–2021

The term "air sports" covers a range of aerial activities, including air racing, aerobatics, aeromodelling, hang gliding, human-powered aircraft, parachuting, paragliding, soaring, and skydiving.

== Recognized and regulated air sports ==
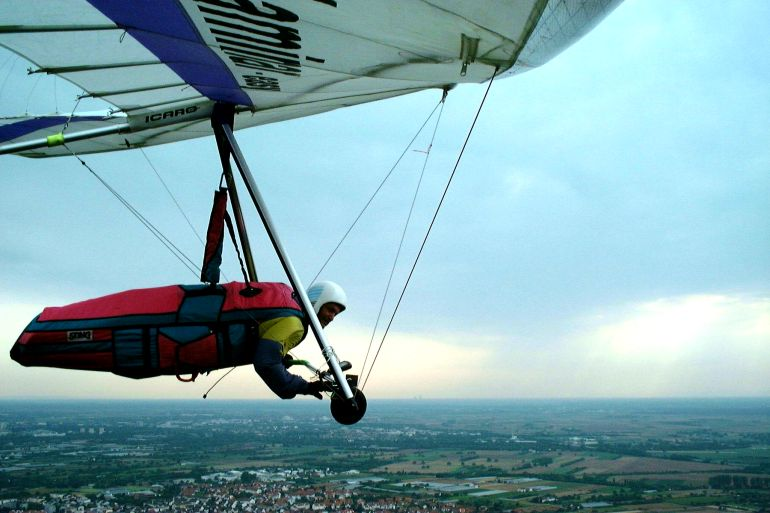
Hang gliding

Many air sports are regulated internationally by the Switzerland-based Fédération Aéronautique Internationale (FAI) and nationally by aero clubs such as the National Aeronautics Association (NAA) and the Royal Aero Club (RAeC). The FAI has separate commissions for each air sport. For example, the commission for ballooning is the Commission Internationale de l'Aérostation (CIA) and Federation of International Dronesoccer Association (FIDA).

Sports within the categories of air sports and their respective commissions are as follows:

=== Motorized ===
- Aerobatics (CIVA)
- Aeromodelling (CIAM)
- Air racing (GAC)
- Drone racing (CIAM)
- Dronesoccer (FIDA)
- Flyboarding
- Powered hang gliding (CIMA)
- Powered paragliding (CIMA)
- Rally flying (GAC)
- Rotorcraft (CIG)
- Ultralight aviation (Note: "Ultralight aircraft provide a new form of air sport and of leisure activity open to all.") (CIMA)

=== Wind/Gliding ===
- Ballooning (CIA)
  - Cluster ballooning
  - Hopper ballooning
- Canopy piloting (ISC)
- Gliding (Note: "Sailplane soaring is both a safe and widely accessible new air sport.") (IGC)
- Hang gliding (CIVL)
- Human-powered flying (CIACA)
- Kiteboarding/kitesurfing
- Kiting
  - Kite fighting
- Paragliding (CIVL)

=== Gravity ===
- BASE jumping
  - Cliff jumping
- Bodyflight
- Bungee jumping
- High diving
- Parachuting/skydiving (ISC)
  - Banzai skydiving
  - Skysurfing
- Trapeze
- Wingsuit flying (ISC)

== Other activities ==
Other aerial activities not governed by the FAI rules:

- Rocket Racing League (an attempt to create a new air sport)

== Competitions ==
- FIDA World Championship
- Reno Air Races
- FAI World Grand Prix
- World Air Games

== See also ==
- Lawn chair Larry
- Airsport, a Czech aircraft manufacturer
