= Fédération Aéronautique Internationale =

World governing body for air sports

World Air Sports Federation
- Fédération Aéronautique Internationale
- Abbreviation: FAI
- Formation: 14 October 1905; 120 years ago
- Founded at: Paris, France
- Type: Nonprofit
- Location: Lausanne, Switzerland
- President: Greg Principato
- Secretary General: Markus Haggeney
- Website: www.fai.org

The World Air Sports Federation (French: Fédération aéronautique internationale; FAI) is the world governing body for air sports, and also stewards definitions regarding human spaceflight. It was founded on 14 October 1905, and is headquartered in Lausanne, Switzerland. It maintains world records for aeronautical activities, including ballooning, aeromodeling, and unmanned aerial vehicles (drones), as well as flights into space.

== History ==
The FAI was founded at a conference held in Paris 12–14 October 1905, which was organized following a resolution passed by the Olympic Congress held in Brussels on 10 June 1905 calling for the creation of an Association "to regulate the sport of flying, ... the various aviation meetings and advance the science and sport of Aeronautics." The conference was attended by representatives from 8 countries: Belgium (Aéro Club Royal de Belgique, founded 1901), France (Aéro-Club de France, 1898), Germany (Deutscher Luftschiffer Verband aka "German Airship League", founded 1902), Great Britain (Royal Aero Club, 1901), Italy (Aero Club d'Italia, 1904), Spain (Real Aero Club de España,1905), Switzerland (Aero-Club der Schweiz, 1900) and the United States (Aero Club of America, 1905).

On 2 February 2017 the FAI announced its new strategic partnership with international asset management firm Noosphere Ventures. FAI Secretary General Susanne Schödel, FAI President Frits Brink and Noosphere Ventures Managing Partner Max Polyakov signed the agreement, making Noosphere Ventures FAI's Global Technical Partner.

The FAI suspended Russia and Belarus due to the 2022 Russian invasion of Ukraine, as a result of which pilots from Russia and Belarus will not be able to compete in any FAI-sanctioned event in the 14 FAI air sports disciplines, including paragliding, hang gliding, and paramotoring.

== FAI General Conference ==
The 117th FAI General Conference took place in Dayton, Ohio, US (the 'Birthplace of Aviation') on 26 and 27 October 2023.

The 118th FAI General Conference was held from 20 to 21 November 2024 in Riyadh, Saudi Arabia.

The 119th FAI General Conference was held from 22 to 24 October 2025 in Vantaa, Finland.

The 120th FAI General Conference will take place in Lausanne, Switzerland from 14 to 16 October 2026.

== Sports ==
14 Sports:

1. Aeromodelling (modelling (space modulation) – Space Modelling)
2. Amateur-Built & Experimental Aircraft
3. Ballooning
4. Drones
5. General Aviation
6. Gliding
7. Hang Gliding
8. Microlights and Paramotors
9. Paragliding
10. Powered and glider aircraft Aerobatics
11. Rotorcraft
12. Parachuting (Skydiving)
13. Space
14. Indoor Skydiving (Bodyflight)

== Air Sport Commissions ==
1. General Air Sports (CASI)
2. Aerobatics (CIVA)
3. Aeromodelling (CIAM)
4. Amateur-Built and Experimental Aircraft (CIACA)
5. Astronautic Records (ICARE)
6. Ballooning (CIA)
7. General Aviation (GAC)
8. Gliding (IGC)
9. Hang Gliding and Paragliding (CIVL)
10. Microlight and Paramotor (CIMA)
11. Rotorcraft (CIG)
12. Skydiving (ISC)

== Events ==
- World Air Games
- World Paragliding Championships
- World Gliding Championships
- World Parachuting Championships
- FAI World Aerobatic Championships
- World Hot Air Ballooning Championships
- FAI World Paramotor Slalom Championships
- 2023 FAI F3P World Championships
- World Cup of Indoor Skydiving
- FAI World Grand Prix
- Red Bull Air Race World Championship
- Parachuting (Skydiving)

All the events sanctioned by the FAI are listed in its events calendar.

=== World Championships ===
The year that the first World Championship in each class (see Model aircraft competitions and classes took place are as follows:

1. 1951: F1A, F1B, F1C
2. 1960: F2A, F2B, F2C, F3A
3. 1961: F1D
4. 1970: F4B, F4C
5. 1972: S-classes
6. 1977: F3B
7. 1978: F2D
8. 1985: F3C, F3D
9. 1986: F3E (now: F5B)
10. 1989: F1E
11. 1994: F5D (now F3E)
12. 1998: F3
13. 2010: F6A (WAG)
14. 2010: F6B (WAG)
15. 2010: F6D (WAG)
16. 2011: F3K
17. 2012: F3F
18. 2013: F3N
19. 2013: F3P
20. 2014: F4H
21. 2018: F3U (now renamed to F9U)
22. 2019: F5J
23. 2024: F3M

== Activities ==
The FAI is the international governing body for the following activities:

- Aerobatics through the FAI Aerobatics Commission (Commission Internationale de Voltige Aérienne – CIVA)
- Aeromodeling and drones through the FAI Aeromodelling Commission (Commission Internationale d'Aéro-Modélisme – CIAM)
- Ballooning through the FAI Ballooning Commission (Commission Internationale de l'Aérostation – CIA)
- General aviation through the FAI General Aviation Commission (General Aviation Commission – GAC)
- Gliding through the FAI Gliding Commission (International Gliding Commission – IGC)
- Hang gliding & Paragliding through the FAI Hang Gliding & Paragliding Commission (Commission Internationale de Vol Libre – CIVL)
- Human-powered aircraft through the FAI Amateur-Built and Experimental Aircraft Commission (Commission Internationale des Aéronefs de Construction Amateur – CIACA)
- Microlighting and Paramotoring through the FAI Microlight & Paramotor Commission (Commission Internationale de Microaviation – CIMA)
- Skydiving through the FAI International Skydiving Commission
- Rotorcraft through the FAI Rotorcraft Commission (Commission Internationale de giraviation – CIG)

The FAI establishes the standards for records in the activities. Where these are air sports, the FAI also oversees international competitions at world and continental levels, and also organizes the World Air Games and FAI World Grand Prix.

The FAI organises the FAI International Drones Conference and Expo. This event offers a platform for organisations, businesses and individuals to discuss how drones are used today and to create a framework for how they will be used and impact on life in the future.

The FAI also keeps records set in human spaceflight, through the FAI Astronautic Records Commission (International Astronautic Records Commission – ICARE)

=== Kármán Line definition ===
The FAI defines the limit between Earth's atmosphere and outer space, the so-called Kármán line, as the altitude of 100 kilometres (62 miles; 330,000 feet) above Earth's sea level.

== Records ==
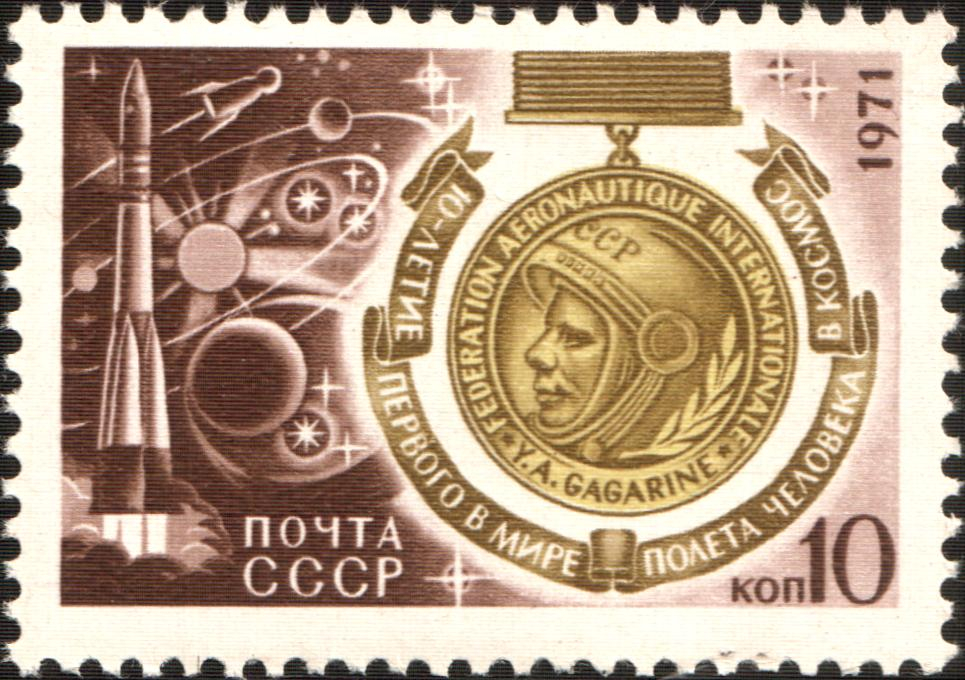
1971 USSR commemorative stamp depicting the Yuri A. Gagarin Gold Medal established by FAI

Among the FAI's responsibilities are the verification of record-breaking flights. For a flight to be registered as a "World Record," it has to comply with the FAI's strict rules, which include a proviso that the record must exceed the previous record by a certain percentage. Since the late 1930s, military aircraft have dominated some classes of record for powered aircraft such as speed, distance, payload, and height, though other classes are regularly claimed by civilians.

Some records are claimed by countries as their own, even though their achievements fail to meet FAI standards. These claims are not typically granted the status of official records. For example, Yuri Gagarin earned recognition for the first human spaceflight, despite failing to meet FAI requirements. The FAI initially did not recognize the achievement because he did not land in his Vostok spacecraft (he ejected from it), but later it recognized that Gagarin was the first human to fly into space. The FAI then established the Yuri A. Gagarin Gold Medal, which has been awarded since 1968.

=== Classes ===
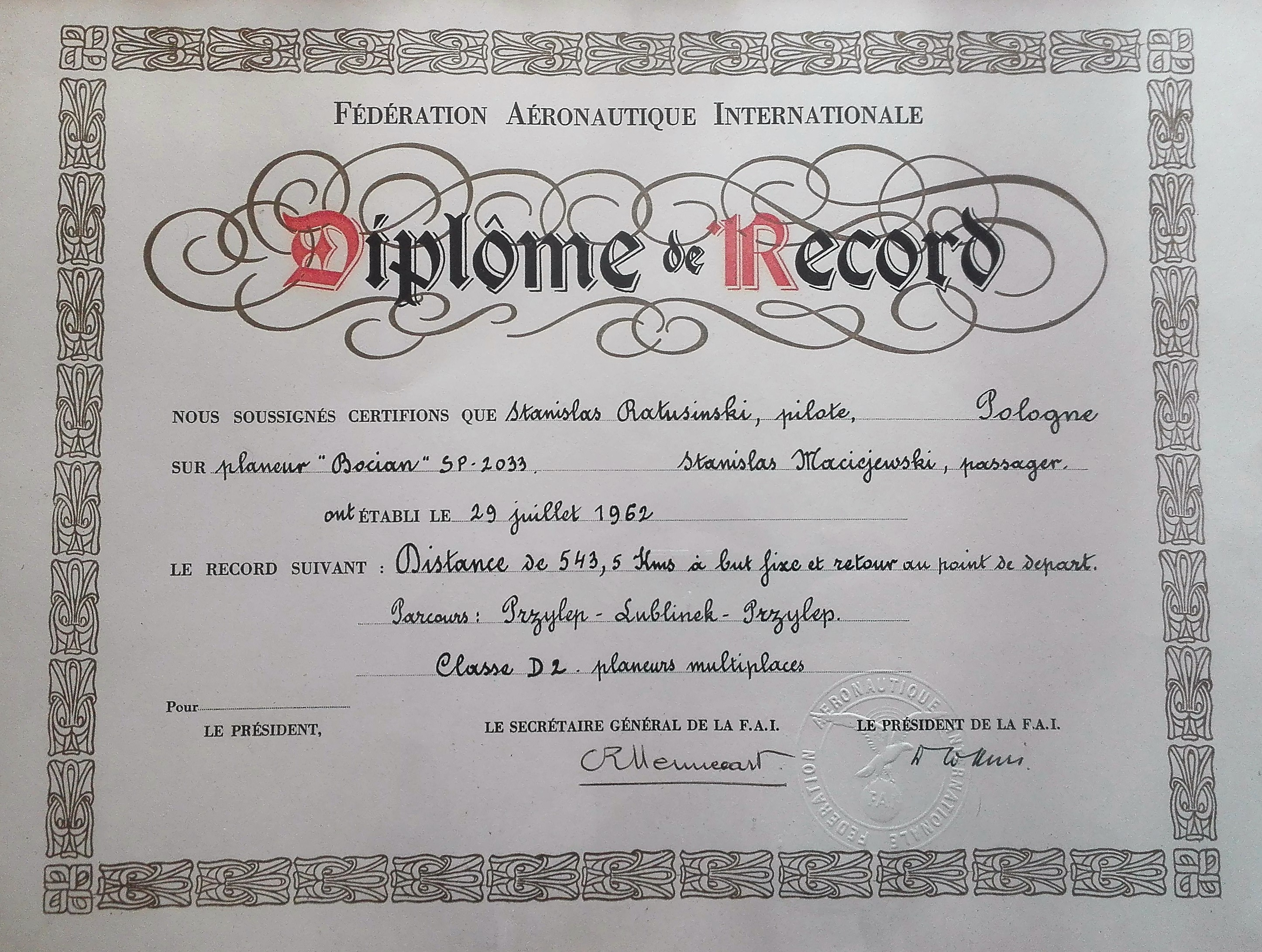
Record flight diploma issued by the FAI

The following types of craft have records:

- Class A Free Balloons
- Class B Airships
- Class C Aeroplanes
  - Class CS Solar-Powered Aeroplanes
- Class D Gliders & Motorgliders
- Class E Rotorcraft
- Class F Model Aircraft
  - Class F1 – Free flight
  - Class F2 – Control line
  - Class F3 – Radio control
    - F3K – Discus Launch Glider
    - F3F – Slope Soaring
  - Class F4 – Scale model aircraft
  - Class F5 – Electrically powered model aircraft
    - F5B – Electric powered motor gliders
    - F5D – Electric powered pylon racing model aircraft
  - Class F8 – Autonomous flight (created by CIAM in 2006, later retired)
  - Class F9 – Drone Sports
    - F9A – Drone soccer
    - F9U – Drone racing (ex F3U)
- Class G Parachuting
- Class H Vertical Take-off and Landing (VTOL) Aeroplanes
- Class I Manpowered aircraft
- Class K Spacecraft
- Class M Tilt-Wing/Tilt Engine Aircraft
- Class N Short Take-off and Landing (STOL) Aeroplanes
- Class O Hang Gliding & Paragliding
- Class P Aerospacecraft
- Class R Microlights and Paramotors
- Class S Space Models (Model rockets)
- Class U Unmanned aerial vehicles

=== Selected records ===
Date	Measurement	Person	Aircraft	Type	Ref(s)
Class A: Free balloons
31 January 2015	160 hours 34 minutes.	Troy Bradley (United States); Leonid Tyukhtyaev (Russia)	Two Eagles Balloon	Duration	
31 March 1999	40,814 km.	Bertrand Piccard (Switzerland); Brian Jones (Great Britain)	Breitling Orbiter	Distance	
4 May 1961	34,668 meters	Malcolm Ross (United States); Victor Prather (United States)	Winzen	Absolute altitude	
Class C: Aeroplanes
11 February 2006	41,467.53 km	Steve Fossett (United States)	Virgin Atlantic GlobalFlyer	Flight distance record (without refueling)	
28 July 1976	3,529.56 km/h	Eldon W. Joersz (United States)	Lockheed SR-71 Blackbird	Flight airspeed record	
31 August 1977	37,650 m	Aleksandr Vasilyevich Fedotov (Soviet Union)	MiG E-266M	Flight altitude record	
22 October 1938	17,083 m	Mario Pezzi (Italy)	Caproni Ca.161	Flight altitude record (piston engine without payload)	
Class CS: Solar-powered aeroplanes
7 July 2010	9,235 m 26 h 10 m 19 s	André Borschberg (Switzerland)	Solar Impulse (Prototype)	Solar powered Duration and Flight altitude record	
25 May 2012	1116 km	André Borschberg (Switzerland)	Solar Impulse (Prototype)	Solar powered Distance	
Class D: Gliders & motorgliders
3 September 2017	15,902 m	Jim Payne (United States); Morgan Sandercock (Australia)	Windward Performance Perlan II	Gliding Altitude	
2 September 2018	23,202 m	Tim Gardner (United States); Jim Payne (United States)	Windward Performance Perlan II	Gliding Altitude (to be ratified)	
21 January 2003	3,008.8 km	Klaus Ohlmann (Germany); Karl Rabeder (Austria)	Schempp-Hirth Nimbus-4	Gliding Distance	
Class E-1: Helicopters
11 August 1986	400.87 km/h	John Trevor Egginton (Great Britain)	Westland Lynx G-LYNX (modified)	Speed over a straight 15/25 km course	
Class G-2: Parachuting performance records
14 October 2012	1357.6 km/h	Felix Baumgartner (Austria)	Red Bull Stratos	Vertical speed	
8 February 2006	400 Skydivers	World Team	5 Lockheed C-130	Largest Skydiving Formation	
Class I-C: Humanpowered aeroplane
23 April 1988	115.11 km 3h 54mn 59s	Kanellos Kanellopoulos (Greece)	MIT Daedalus 88	Human powered Distance and Duration	
2 October 1985	44.32 km/h	Holger Rochelt (West Germany)	Musculair II	Speed over a closed circuit	
Class I-E: Humanpowered rotorcraft
25 September 2013	1min 37.5 sec	Justin Mauch (United States)	Gamera	Duration	
Class O: Hang Gliding & Paragliding
13 October 2016	564.3.0 km	Donizete Baldessar Lemos (Brazil); Rafael Monteiro Saladini (Brazil); Samuel Nascimento (Brazil)	Ozone Enzo 2 Ozone Enzo 2 Gin Boomerang 10	Straight distance with a paraglider	
Class R: Microlights
14 February 2002	187 km/h	Julian Harris (Great Britain); Bob Sharp (Great Britain)	Jabiru Aircraft UL	3 axis flight airspeed record	
Class U: Unmanned aerial vehicles
14 August 2001	96,863 feet (29,524 m)	Piloted remotely by Greg Kendall (United States)	AeroVironment Helios Prototype	Sustained horizontal flight altitude record by a winged aircraft	

== Awards ==
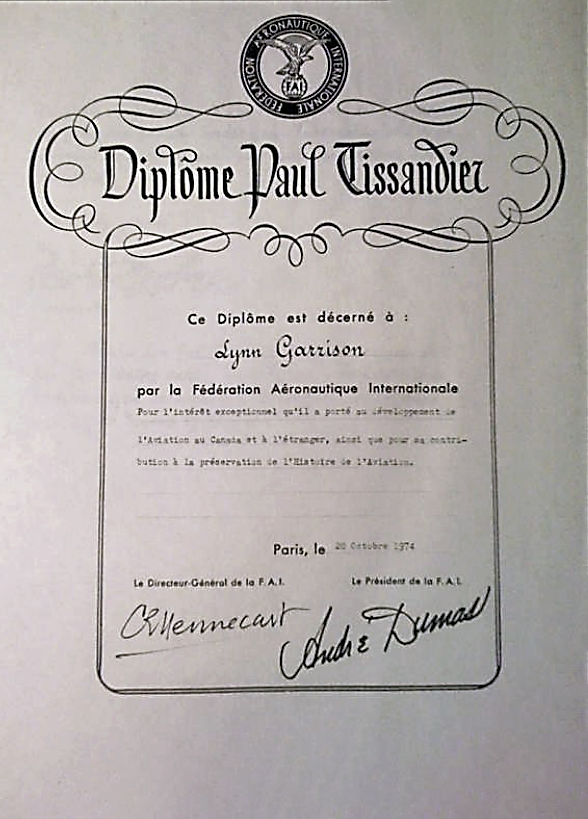
Diplome Paul Tissandier

The FAI Gold Air Medal was established in 1924 and was first awarded in 1925. It is reserved for those who have contributed greatly to the development of aeronautics by their activities, work, achievements, initiative or devotion to the cause of Aviation. The FAI has also awarded the Paul Tissandier Diploma since 1952 to those who have served the cause of aviation in general and sporting aviation in particular.

The FAI also makes awards for each of the following air sports.

- Awards for Ballooning:
  - The Montgolfier Ballooning Diploma
  - The Santos Dumont Gold Airship Medal
- Awards for General Aviation:
  - The Charles Lindbergh General Aviation Diploma
- Awards for Gliding:
  - The Lilienthal Gliding Medal
  - The Pelagia Majewska Gliding Medal
  - The Pirat Gehriger Diploma
- Awards for Rotorcraft:
  - The FAI Gold Rotorcraft Medal
- Awards for Parachuting:
  - The FAI Gold Parachuting Medal
  - The Leonardo da Vinci Parachuting Diploma
  - The Faust Vrancic Medal
- Awards for Aeromodelling:
  - The FAI Aeromodelling Gold Medal
  - The Andrei Tupolev Aeromodelling Medal
  - The Alphonse Penaud Aeromodelling Diploma
  - The Antonov Aeromodelling Diploma
  - The Andrei Tupolev Aeromodelling Diploma
  - The Frank Ehling Diploma
- Awards for Aerobatics:
  - The Leon Biancotto Aerobatics Diploma
- Awards for Astronautics:
  - The Yuri A. Gagarin Gold Medal
  - The V.M. Komarov Diploma
  - The Korolev Diploma
  - The Odyssey Diploma
- Awards for Hang Gliding:
  - The Pepe Lopes Medal
  - The FAI Hang Gliding Diploma
- Awards for Microlight Aviation:
  - The Colibri Diploma
  - The Ann Welch Diploma
- Awards for Aviation and Space Education:
  - The Nile Gold Medal
- Awards for Amateur-Built Aircraft:
  - The Phoenix Diploma
  - The Phoenix Group Diploma
  - The Henri Mignet Diploma

== FAI Young Artists Contest ==
The FAI Young Artists Contest is an international painting competition for youngsters between the ages of 6 and 17. Each FAI Member Country organises the contest in their country, and the national winners are submitted to the International Jury each year.

== Members ==
=== Active members ===
Country	Member name	Year of Affiliation
Albania	Federata Shqiptare e Aeronautikës	2000
Algeria	Federation Algérienne Des Sports Aériens	
Argentina	Confederacion Argentina De Entidades Aerodeportivas	1910
Australia	Australian Sport Aviation Confederation	1948
Austria	Österreichischer Aero Club	1910
Azerbaijan	Azərbaycan Hava və Ekstremal İdman Növləri Federasiyası	2000
Belarus	Belarusian Federation of Air Sports (suspended)	1994
Belgium	Royal Belgian Aero Club	1905
Bosnia and Herzegovina	Vazduhoplovni Savez Bosne I Hercegovine	1996
Brazil	Comissão de Aerodesporto Brasileira	1919
Bulgaria	Bulgarski Natsionalen Aeroklub	1934
Canada	Aero Club of Canada	1931
Chile	Federacion Aerea De Chile	1921
People's Republic of China	Aero Sports Federation of China	1921
Republic of China	Chinese Taipei Aerosports Federation	1990
Colombia	Federacion Colombiana De Deportes Aereos "Federaeros"	1951
Croatia	Hrvatski Zrakoplovni Savez	1992
Cuba	Aviation Club of Cuba	1927
Cyprus	Kypriaki Aerathlitiki Omospondia	1961
Czech Republic	Aeroklub České Republiky	1920
Denmark	Kongelig Dansk Aeroklub	1909
Egypt	Aero Club of Egypt	1911
Estonia	Eesti Lennuspordi Föderatsioon	1938
Finland	Suomen Ilmailuliitto Ry	1921
France	Aero Club de France	1905
Germany	Deutscher Aero Club e.V.	1905
Greece	Elliniki Aerathlitiki Omospondia	1931
Guatemala	Asociacion Guatemalteca De Deportes Aereos	1953
Hong Kong	Hong Kong Aviation Club Ltd	1977
Hungary	Magyar Repülö- és Légisport Szövetség	1910
Iceland	Flugmálafélag Íslands	1937
India	Aero Club of India	1949
Indonesia	Federasi Aero Sport Indonesia	1973
Ireland	National Aero Club of Ireland	1946
Islamic Republic of Iran	Kanoone Havanavardiye Iran	1964
Israel	Aero Club of Israel	1951
Italy	Aero Club D'Italia	1905
Japan	Nippon Koku Kyokai	1919
Jordan	Royal Aerosports Club of Jordan	2005
Kazakhstan	Kazakhstan Air Sports Federation	1994
Kosovo	Federata Aeronautike e Kosovës	2015
Kuwait	Kuwait Science Club	1972
Latvia	Latvijas Aeroklubs	1938
Lebanon	Aero Club du Liban	1924
Libya	Libyan Airsports Federation	1975
Lithuania	Lietuvos Aeroklubas	1931
Luxembourg	Federation Aeronautique Luxembourgeoise	1929
Malaysia	Persekutuan Sukan Udara Malaysia	1961
Moldova	Federatia De Parapantism Din Republica Moldova	1997
Mongolia	Mongolian Air Sports Federation	2006
Montenegro	Vazduhoplovni Savez Crne Gore	1922
Morocco	Federation Royale Marocaine De L'Aviation Legere Et Sportive	1952
Mozambique	Aeroclube De Mocambique	1986
Nepal	Nepal Airsports Association	2002
Netherlands	Koninklijke Nederlandse Vereniging Voor Luchtvaart	1909
New Zealand	Royal New Zealand Aero Club Inc.	1952
North Macedonia	Vozduhoplovna Federacija Na Makedonija	1993
Norway	Norges Luftsportforbund	1909
Pakistan	All Pakistan Aero Modelling & Ultralight Association	1955
Philippines	3D Air Sports And Hobbies Association, Incorporated	1965
Poland	Aeroklub Polski	1920
Portugal	Aero Club De Portugal	1913
Qatar	Qatar Air Sports Committee	2002
Republic of Korea	Daehanmingook Hang Gong Hwe	1959
Romania	Federatia Aeronautica Romana	1923
Russia	Federatsia Avtsionnogo Sporta Rossii (suspended)	1909
San Marino	Federazione Aeronautica Sammarinese	1971
Saudi Arabia	Saudi Aviation Club	1997
Serbia	Vazduhoplovni Savez Srbije	1922
Singapore	Air Sports Federation of Singapore	1984
Slovakia	Slovenský národný aeroklub gen. M.R. Štefánika	1920
Slovenia	Letalska Zveza Slovenija	1992
South Africa	Aero Club of South Africa	1938
Spain	Real FederacIón Aeroáutica Española	1905
Sweden	Svenska Flygsportförbundet	1907
Switzerland	Aero Club Der Schweiz	1905
Thailand	Royal Aeronautics Sports Association of Thailand	1979
Tunisia	Fédération tunisienne d'Aéronautique et d'Aéromodélisme	2015
Turkey	Türk Hava Kurumu	1925
Ukraine	Federation of Aeronautical Sports of Ukraine	1992
United Arab Emirates	Emirates Aviation Association	1980
United Kingdom	Royal Aero Club of the United Kingdom	1905
United States of America	National Aeronautic Association Of The USA	1905
Uzbekistan	Texnik Va Amaliy Sport Turlari Markazi	1995
Venezuela	Asociacion Venezolana De Los Deportes Aeronauticos (A.V.D.A.)	1952
Vietnam	Hanoi Air Sports Association	

=== Associate members ===
Country	Member Name
Liechtenstein	Modellfluggruppe Liechtenstein; Liechtensteinischer Hängegleiter Verband
Oman	Oman National Free Fall Team
Paraguay	Asociacion Paraguaya Paracaidismo Deportivo
Portugal	Federaçâo Portuguesa De Aeromodelismo; Federaçâo Portuguesa De Voo Livre
Qatar	Qatar Rc Sport Center
Romania	Federatia Romana De Modelism
Uruguay	Asociacion Uruguaya De Parapente

=== Affiliate members ===
Country	
-	Colpar
-	Europe Airsports
-	OSTIV
-	Segelflugszene GGMBH

=== Temporary members ===
Country	Member name
Armenia	National Committee of Aeromodelling And Spacemodelling Sports
El Salvador	Federacion Salvadoreña De Paracaidismo Y Aerodeportes
Iraq	Al- Sokoor Aero Club
Laos	Lao Airsports Club
Paraguay	Asociacion Paraguaya Paracaidismo Deportivo
Syrian Arab Republic	Syrian Parachute Federation
Vietnam	Hanoi Air Sports Association

=== Suspended members ===
Country	Member Name
Botswana	Parachute Association Of Botswana
Ecuador	Club De Aeromodelismo Quito
Iraq	Iraqi Aero Federation
Mexico	Federacion Mexicana De Aeronautica, A.C.
Monaco	Aero Club De Monaco
Palestine	Palestine Air Sports Federation
Peru	Federacion Peruana Aerodeportiva

== See also ==
- Fédération Internationale de l'Automobile
- Fédération Internationale de Motocyclisme
- Hot air ballooning
- List of spaceflight records
