= El Pobo =

- municipality
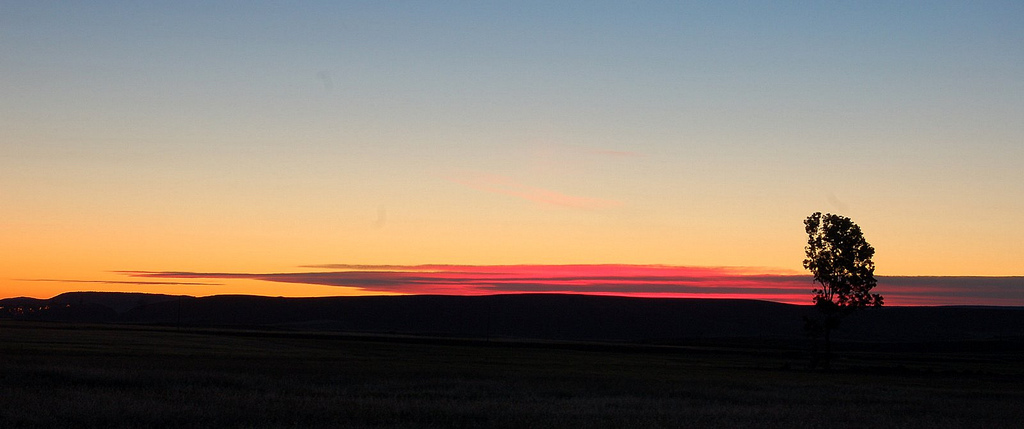

- Location within Spain
- Coordinates: 40°30′N 0°52′W
- Country: Spain
- Autonomous community: Aragon
- Province: Teruel
- Municipality: El Pobo

Area
  - Total: 63 km^{2} (24 sq mi)
- Elevation: 1,399 m (4,590 ft)

Population (2025-01-01)
  - Total: 97
  - Density: 1.5/km^{2} (4.0/sq mi)
- Time zone: UTC+1 (CET)
  - Summer (DST): UTC+2 (CEST)

El Pobo is a municipality located in the province of Teruel, Aragon, Spain. According to the 2004 census (INE), the municipality has a population of 137 inhabitants.

== See also ==
- List of municipalities in Teruel
