= Georgy Mosolov =

Russian aviator and test pilot (1926–2018)

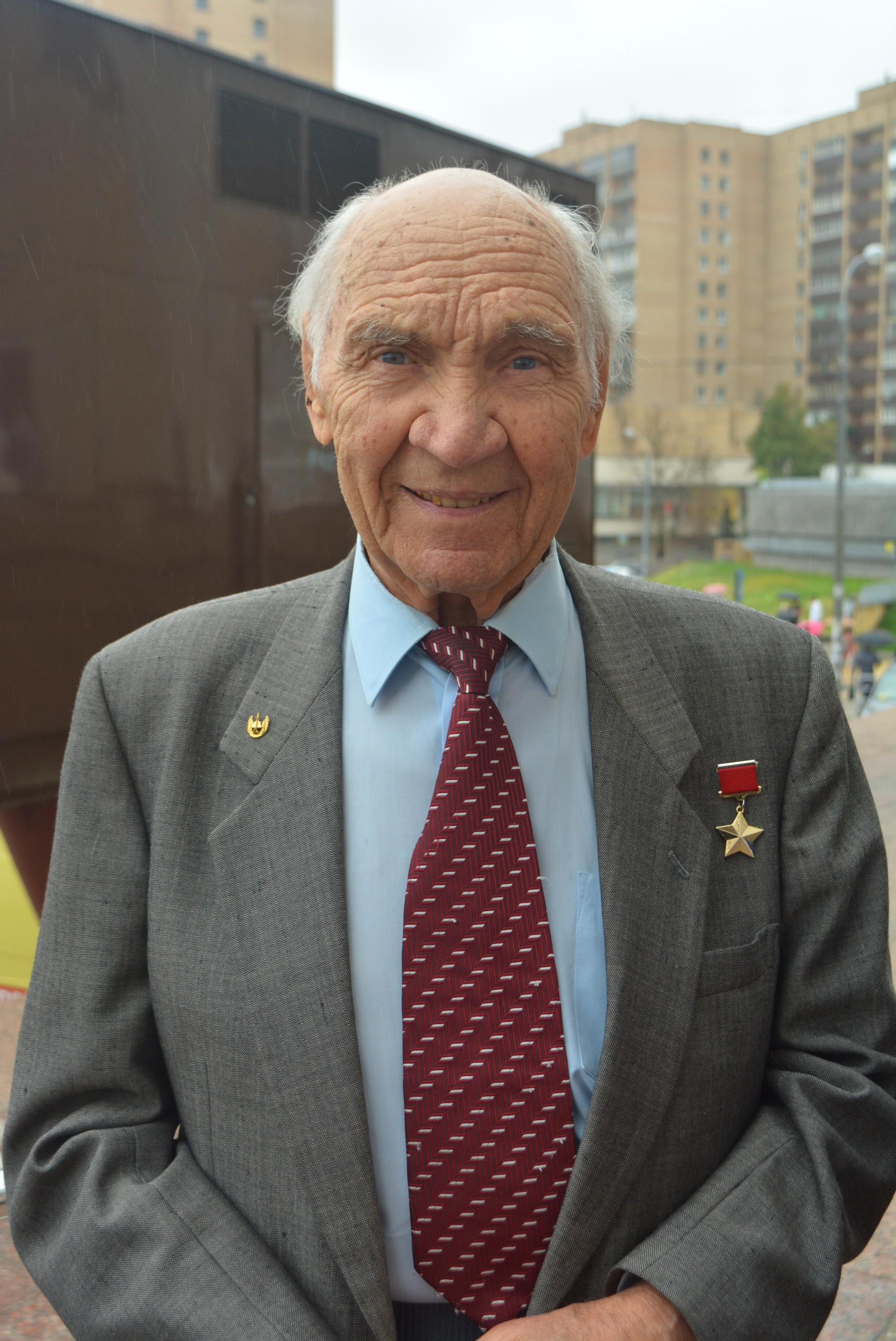
Georgi Mosolov in 2016

Georgy Konstantinovich Mosolov (Russian: Георгий Константинович Мосолов; 3 May 1926, in Ufa, Bashkortostan, Soviet Union – 18 March 2018) was a Soviet Russian test pilot. He attained the rank of Polkovnik (Colonel). He attained two world air speed records, in either the Mikoyan MiG-21 or the prototype Mikoyan Ye-66, as well as one altitude record. Colonel Mosolov was awarded the Hero of the Soviet Union and the Lenin Prize.

Mosolov set air speed records of 2,388 km/h (1,289 kn; 1,484 mph) on 31 October 1959 and 2,681 km/h (1,448 kn; 1,666 mph) and an altitude record of 34,714 m (113,891 ft) in a Ye-166 has in 1962.

Colonel Mosolov also piloted the prototype MiG-21 on its first flight on 14 February 1955.

== Sources ==
- Belyakov, R.A. and J. Marmain. MiG: Fifty Years of Secret Aircraft Design. Shrewsbury, UK:Airlife, 1994. ISBN 1-85310-488-4.
- Hirvonen, Pauli: MMM - Nuorten Ilmailukirja, Otava, Helsinki, 1961 (s. 132)
- Highland, H.J.: Hauska on tietää 4 - Lentotaito, WSOY, 1974, suom. T.J. Kivilahti (alkuteos Wonder Books, Englanti 1961–66, suom. teos painettu Puolassa) ISBN 951-0-04274-9
- Lahtela & Nykänen (toim.): MiG-21 Suomen sinessä, Karjalan Lennoston Kilta ry./Kevama Graf, 1998, Kuopio ISBN 951-97839-0-3 (s.24)
