= Raná (Louny District) =

- Municipality
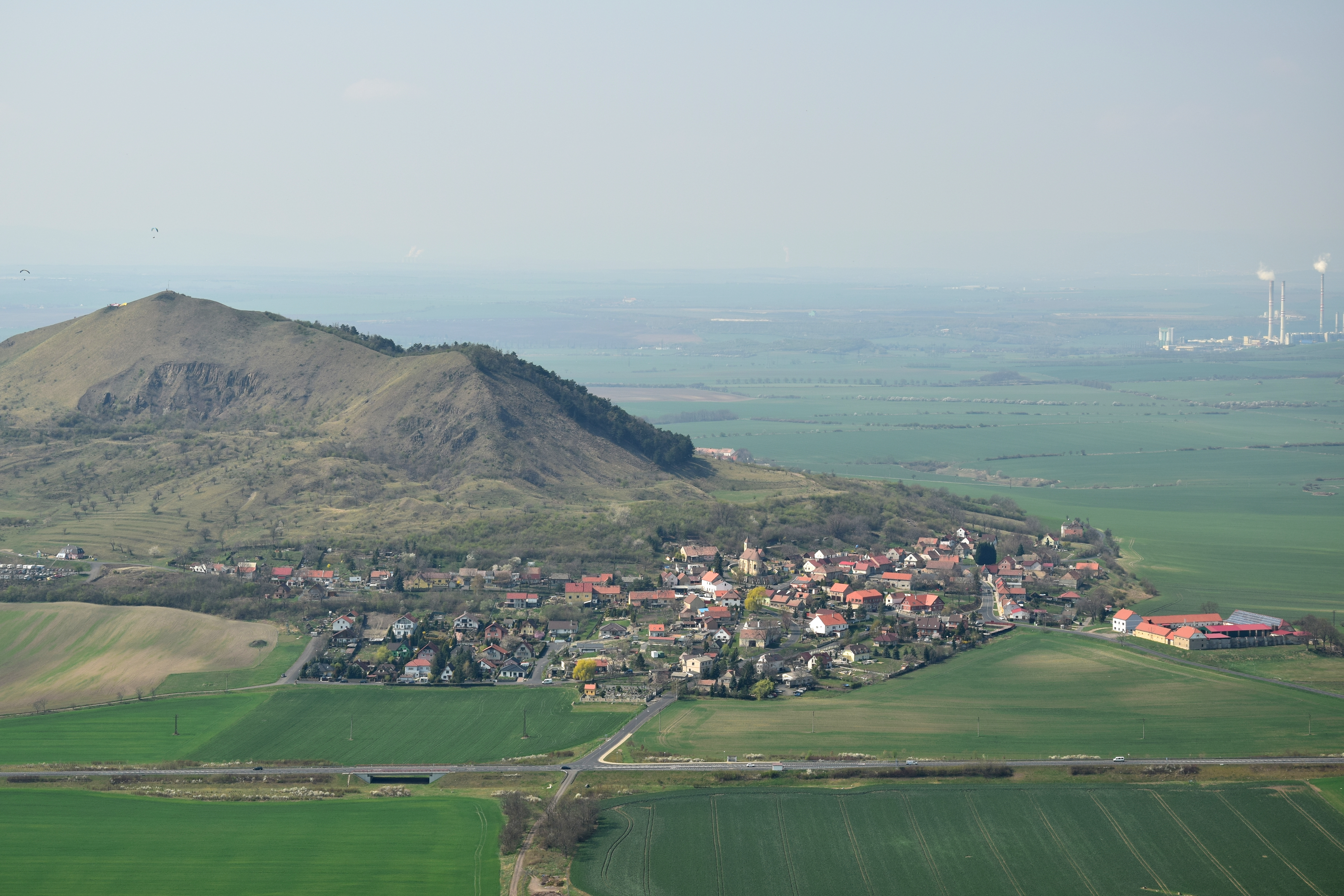
- View from the east

- Flag Coat of arms

- Location in the Czech Republic
- Coordinates: 50°24′42″N 13°46′46″E
- Country: Czech Republic
- Region: Ústí nad Labem
- District: Louny
- First mentioned: 1335

Area
  - Total: 12.34 km^{2} (4.76 sq mi)
- Elevation: 297 m (974 ft)

Population (2026-01-01)
  - Total: 240
  - Density: 19/km^{2} (50/sq mi)
- Time zone: UTC+1 (CET)
  - Summer (DST): UTC+2 (CEST)
- Postal codes: 439 24, 440 01
- Website: www.obec-rana.com

Raná (German: Rannay) is a municipality and village in Louny District in the Ústí nad Labem Region of the Czech Republic. It has about 200 inhabitants.

Raná lies approximately 7 kilometres (4 mi) north of Louny, 34 km (21 mi) south-west of Ústí nad Labem, and 59 km (37 mi) north-west of Prague.

== Administrative division ==
Raná consists of two municipal parts (in brackets population according to the 2021 census):

- Raná (212)
- Hrádek (16)

== Demographics ==
Historical population
Year	Pop.	±%
1869	559	—
1880	640	+14.5%
1890	666	+4.1%
1900	749	+12.5%
1910	745	−0.5%
1921	717	−3.8%
1930	696	−2.9%
1950	407	−41.5%
1961	361	−11.3%
1970	343	−5.0%
1980	267	−22.2%
1991	242	−9.4%
2001	236	−2.5%
2011	252	+6.8%
2021	228	−9.5%
Source: Censuses
