= FAI World Paramotor Slalom Championships =

- Status: active
- Genre: sporting event
- Inaugurated: 2013

The FAI World Paramotor Slalom Championships are an international event in paramotor organized by the Fédération Aéronautique Internationale (FAI). The first championship was held in 2013 in Aspres-sur-Buëch.

== Editions ==
Edition	Year	Host	Date
1	2013	Aspres-sur-Buëch	9–15 September
2	2015	Legnica	27 June–5 July
3	2018	Faiyum	29 October–4 November
4	2022	Strachotín	11–17 September
5	2023	Bornos	4–9 June
6	2024	Lusail	7–13 February

== Medalists ==
=== PL1 ===
Event	Gold	Silver	Bronze
2013 Aspres-sur-Buëch	Marcin Krakowiak (POL)	Frédéric Mallard (FRA)	Michael Nadažy (CZE)
2015 Legnica	Wojciech Bógdał (POL)	Ramón Morillas (ESP)	Piotr Geło (POL)
2018 Faiyum	Wojciech Bógdał (POL)	Szymon Winkler (POL)	Boris Tysebaert (FRA)
2022 Strachotín	Saeed Al-Marri (QAT)	Boris Tysebaert (FRA)	Milan Klement (CZE)
2023 Bornos	Hayan Al-Hebabi (QAT)	Boris Tysebaert (FRA)	Ibrahim Hussain (QAT)
2024 Lusail	Boris Tysebaert (FRA)	Hayan Al-Hebabi (QAT)	Ibrahim Hussain (QAT)

=== PF1 ===
Event	Gold	Silver	Bronze
2013 Aspres-sur-Buëch	Grzegorz Krzyżanowski (POL)	Alex Matéos (FRA)	Marek Furtak (POL)
2015 Legnica	Jérémy Penone (FRA)	Piotr Ficek (POL)	Marcin Bernat (POL)
2018 Faiyum	Alex Matéos (FRA)	Nicolas Aubert (FRA)	Luboš Halama (CZE)
2022 Strachotín	Alex Matéos (FRA)	Nayef Al Balushi (QAT)	Jérémy Penone (FRA)
2023 Bornos	Alex Matéos (FRA)	Eissa Al-Hajjaji (QAT)	Naif Al-Baloshi (QAT)
2024 Lusail	Alex Matéos (FRA)	Jérémy Penone (FRA)	Cyril Planton (FRA)

=== PF1F ===
Event	Gold	Silver	Bronze
2015 Legnica	Marie Liepmann (FRA)	Coralie Matéos (FRA)	Magdalena Adamek (POL)
2018 Faiyum	Marie Matéos (FRA)	Aurelia Hallé (FRA)	Helina Nieminem (FIN)
2022 Strachotín	Marie Matéos (FRA)	Morgane Planton (FRA)	
2024 Lusail	Morgane Planton (FRA)	Leah Catullo (USA)	Naomi Deppe (BEL)

=== PL2 ===
Event	Gold	Silver	Bronze
2015 Legnica	Kirill Ekimov (RUS); Ekaterina Kalinina (RUS)	Tomasz Krotecki (POL); Ewelina Krotecka (POL)	Daniel Walkowiak (POL); Olga Karwańska (POL)

=== PF2 ===
Event	Gold	Silver	Bronze
2015 Legnica	Norbert Nowicki (POL); Grzegorz Roszkowski (POL)	Not awarded	

=== PF1E ===
Event	Gold	Silver	Bronze
2015 Legnica	Pierre Lefebvre (FRA)	Marie Liepmann (FRA)	Not awarded

=== PF1 Racing Teams ===
Event	Gold	Silver	Bronze
2015 Legnica	Poland; Kamil Mańkowski; Piotr Ficek; Adam Piórek (Andrzej Malkusz)	France; Julien Meyer; Nicolas Aubert; Jérémy Penone (François Blanc)	Poland; Marcin Bernat; Bartosz Nowicki; Paweł Kozarzewski (Jacek Ciszkowski)
2024 Lusail	France	Qatar	Czech Republic

=== PL1 Racing Teams ===
Event	Gold	Silver	Bronze
2013 Aspres-sur-Buëch	Poland	France	France
2015 Legnica	Poland; Wojciech Bógdał; Piotr Geło; Tomasz Dembczyński (Krzysztof Romicki)	Spain; Ramón Morillas; Vicente Palmero; Javier Tejeiro	France; Laurent Assié; Yann Laudière; Frédéric Mallard
2024 Lusail	France	Qatar	Czech Republic

=== Teams ===
Event	Gold	Silver	Bronze
2013 Aspres-sur-Buëch	Poland	France	Spain
2015 Legnica	Poland	France	Spain
2018 Faiyum	France	Czech Republic	Poland
2022 Strachotín	Qatar	France	Czech Republic
2023 Bornos	France	Qatar	Czech Republic
2024 Lusail	France	Qatar	Czech Republic
