= Eldon W. Joersz =

American pilot (born 1944)

Eldon Wayne Joersz
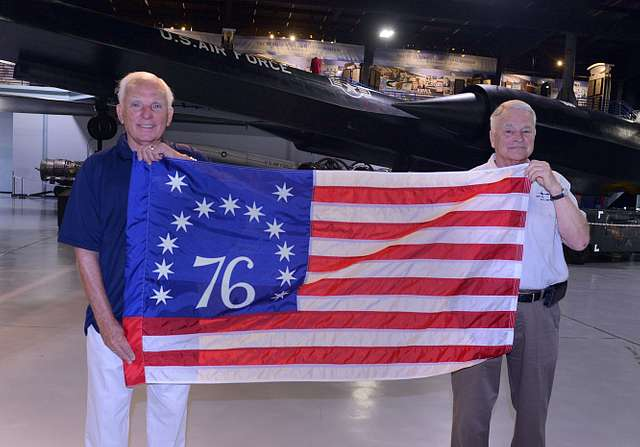
- Eldon Joersz (left) and George Morgan
- Born: February 5, 1944 (age 82)
- Military career
- Allegiance: United States of America
- Branch: United States Air Force
- Service years: 1966–1997
- Rank: Major General
- Nickname: Al Joersz
- Commands: 410th Bombardment Wing; 4th Fighter Wing
- Awards: Legion of Merit; Defense Distinguished Service Medal; Defense Meritorious Service Medal

Major General Eldon Wayne Joersz (born February 5, 1944) is an American pilot, who jointly holds the World record for crewed airbreathing jet aircraft.

Joersz and Ltc George T. Morgan Jr. set the air speed record on July 28, 1976, in SR-71A Blackbird 61-7958 at Beale Air Force Base. They went to 2,193.167 mph (3,529.56 km/h), breaking the record of Daniel Andre and Robert L. Stephens of 2,070 mph (3,330 km/h).

During his career in the United States Air Force, Joersz held several positions, including instructor for the T-38 Talon and SR-71, as a pilot during the Vietnam War in an F-105 Thunderchief from Takhli Royal Thai Air Force Base in Thailand; as well as Wing Commander of the 410th Bombardment Wing (redesignated 410th Bomb Wing in 1992) of the Eighth Air Force from May 1987 to May 1989 at K.I. Sawyer AFB, Michigan, over Strategic Air Command's 307th and 46th Air Refueling Squadrons, and the 644th Bombardment Squadron.

His awards include the Defense Distinguished Service Medal, Legion of Merit, and the Defense Meritorious Service Medal, amongst others.

Joersz began his education in Hazen, North Dakota. From there, he graduated from North Dakota State University in 1966 with an ROTC commission and received his master's degree from Auburn University in 1978. He retired from the Air Force in 1997.
