= Escalona del Prado =

- Municipality
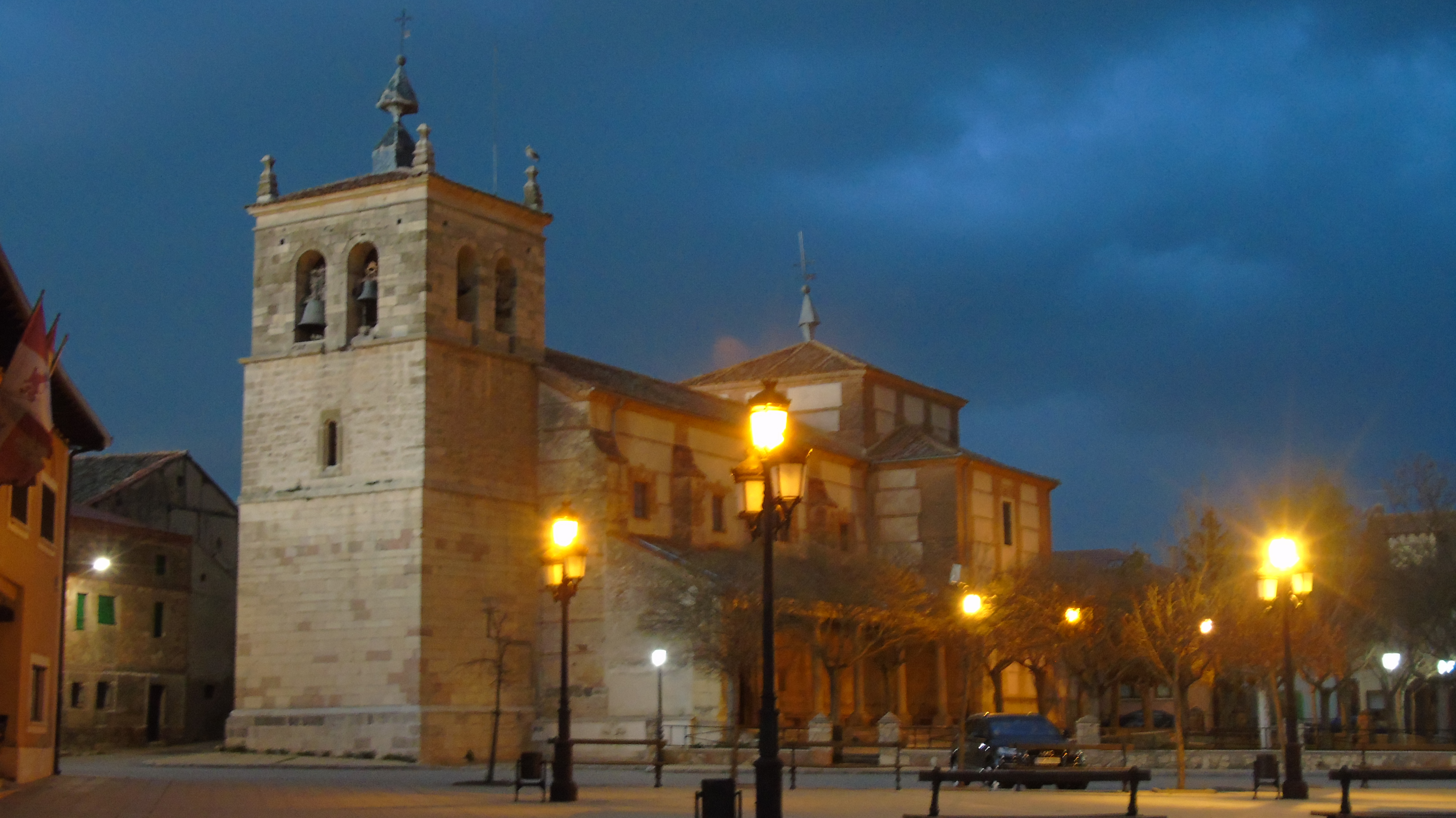

- Coat of arms

- Location in Spain. Escalona del Prado (Spain)
- Coordinates: 41°10′00″N 4°07′22″W
- Country: Spain
- Autonomous community: Castile and León
- Province: Segovia
- Comarca: Tierra de Pinares
- Judicial district: Segovia

Government
  - Mayor: Juan Justo Mardomingo Herrero

Area
  - Total: 31.79 km^{2} (12.27 sq mi)
- Elevation: 832 m (2,730 ft)

Population (2025-01-01)
  - Total: 475
  - Density: 14.9/km^{2} (38.7/sq mi)
- Time zone: UTC+1 (CET)
  - Summer (DST): UTC+2 (CEST)
- Postal code: 40350
- Website: Official website

Escalona del Prado is a municipality located in the province of Segovia, Castile and León, Spain. In 2009, the municipality has a population of 606.
