= Banzai skydiving =

Rumored form of skydiving

In this video, the parachute was not thrown out of the plane, but was attached to Gasson by a special harness underneath his clothes and sleeve and is therefore not a complete Banzai Skydive.

Banzai skydiving is a rumored form of skydiving in which the skydiver throws their parachute out the airplane door, waits, and then jumps after it. To be successful, the skydiver must catch the parachute, secure it, and glide to the projected landing zone. There is no known, credible evidence that a banzai skydive has ever really occurred according to its definition.

There have, however, been multiple recorded instances of skydivers jumping without being attached to a parachute. However, these jumps lack the element that make them a banzai skydive, where a parachute is thrown out of the plane then caught by the jumper after some delay. During skydives where the jumper is detached from the skydiving rig, the rig is held by the skydiver or an assistant until the skydiver is secured to the rig. This is due to the skydiving rig having a much slower terminal velocity than a skydiver is capable of achieving. This has led the skydiving community to doubt the idea that banzai skydiving has ever occurred as defined.

Skydivers jumping while detached from a rig wear a special harness that attaches to a cord extending from the parachute. The cord can be clearly seen in Andreas Dachtler's jump video taken in Southeast Europe. This ensures the skydiver can safely recover the parachute. Otherwise, the legstraps on a normal harness would require a thread through. This would be impossible while in free fall.

The banzai skydive is the most dangerous category in the Guinness Book of World Records, according to Editor Craig Glenday. Yasuhiro Kubo took the challenge on September 2, 2000. Kubo supposedly fell alongside the rig for 50 seconds after jumping before regaining and deploying his parachute. Details about the jump are sparse and it is unknown whether Kubo or another skydiver held onto the rig while falling. This won him a place in the Guinness World Records. This claim however was not witnessed by a Guinness Book of World Records official, but was witnessed by an unknown expert. No video or photographic evidence exists to support the claim.
