= Edward Powles =

English aviator

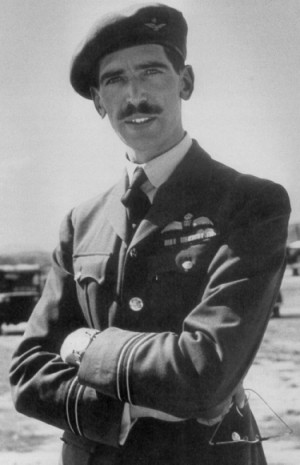
- Edward Powles
- Born: 19 April 1921; Hereford, England
- Died: 23 February 2008 (aged 86); Arden, North Carolina
- Burial place: Arden, North Carolina
- Military career
- Allegiance: United Kingdom
- Branch: Royal Air Force
- Rank: Flight Lieutenant
- Unit: 81st Squadron
- Conflicts: Malayan Emergency
- Awards: Air Force Cross

Edward Cyril Powles (1921–2008) AFC was an English Royal Air Force pilot who set two notable records while flying Supermarine Spitfire photo-reconnaissance (PR) aeroplanes over the People's Republic of China.

== Early life ==
Edward Ted C. Powles was born in Hereford, England, on 19 April 1921, to George and Louise Tillam Powles.

Despite his height of 6 feet, 4 inches (1.93 m), Powles joined the Royal Air Force as an apprentice during the Second World War and trained as a photo-reconnaissance pilot, remaining in service after the cessation of hostilities. On 21 October 1945, he was confirmed in his appointments and promoted from the rank of pilot officer (probationary) to flying officer (war substantive rank), which was gazetted on 7 December. He was gazetted on 11 February 1949, as a flight lieutenant, short service (A.M.O. A899/47) with effect from 13 October 1948 (and with seniority from 21 October 1948).

Having previously flown twin-engined aircraft, Flight Lieutenant Powles was ordered to RAF Finningley in January 1950, to complete a refresher course on the Supermarine Spitfire PR14, then to RAF Leuchars for familiarisation training on the Spitfire PR19. Following this, he was posted in August to RAF Tengah in Singapore during the Malayan emergency, carrying out photo-reconnaissance and ground attack missions in the Spitfire FR18 in Operation Firedog. He transferred to 81 (PR) Squadron at RAF Seletar in 1950, and continued to fly operationally over Malaya until he was detached as part of a two Spitfire PR.XIX flight (Spitfires PS852 and PS854) deployed to RAF Kai Tak in Hong Kong on 1 January 1951. The other pilot was Flight Sergeant Padden. The two flew photo-reconnaissance flights over Communist China beginning on 16 January, when Powles overflew nearby islands in PS852. Powles flew 63 sorties over China in 1951. Padden was replaced in turn by Flight Sergeants Mutch, Hood, and Walker. By September 1952, the flight had photographed sites along the Chinese coastline up to 400 nautical miles (740 km) to the south-west of Hong Kong, and up to 160 nautical miles (296 km) to the north-east, as well as sites up to 100 nautical miles (185 km) from the coast. During these flights, Powles set two notable records.

During a meteorological test flight on 5 February 1952, Powles reached 51,550 feet (15,697m) in PS852, the highest altitude ever recorded for a non-purpose built piston-engined aircraft. During the descent, the aircraft dived uncontrollably and reached a speed of 690 mph (1110 km/h, Mach 0.96) before he regained control, the highest speed ever recorded for a piston-engined aircraft.

Edward Powles was awarded the Air Force Cross in June 1952. Part of his citation read: This officer, even when flying at altitude, often over the sea, alone in a single-seater aircraft, has always shown the greatest determination to complete his mission although this entailed returning to base with his fuel almost exhausted; he has repeatedly earned high praise for his skill, courage and high standard of airmanship.

== Family ==
Powles married in 1947 to Dr. Marie Antoinette Powles, and the couple lived in Arden, North Carolina. Their son, David E. Powles, is also a doctor.

== Death ==
Powles died in Arden on 23 February 2008.
