= FAI World Grand Prix =

Grand Prix aerobatics series

FAI World Grand Prix is a Grand Prix aerobatics series led by Fédération Aéronautique Internationale.

From 1990 to 1995, the competition was named as the Breitling Series.

== List of events and results ==
#	Year	Event	Location	Note	Winner	Ref
I	1996	Nippon Japanese Grand Prix	(Japan) Hyōgo Prefecture, Tajima Airport Festival		(France) Dominique Roland	
II	1996	Chinese Grand Prix	Zhuhai, Airshow China		(Lithuania) Jurgis Kairys	
III	1998	Swiss Grand Prix	(Switzerland) Neuchâtel International Air & Space Festival		(France) Dominique Roland	
IV	1998	Chinese Grand Prix	(China) Shanghai		(Hungary) Péter Besenyei	
V	1998	Chinese Grand Prix	(China) Nanjing, Jiangsu Province		(Hungary) Péter Besenyei	
VI	1998	Chinese Grand Prix	(China) Jinan, Shandong Province		(Russia) Nikolay Timofeev	
VII	1998	Chinese Grand Prix	(China) Tianjin		(Hungary) Péter Besenyei	
VIII	1998	Chinese Grand Prix - China Cup	(China) Shijiazhuang, Hebei Province	cancelled/weather		
IX	1998	Chinese Grand Prix	(China) Zhengzhou, Henan Province		(Hungary) Péter Besenyei	
X	1998	Nippon Japanese Grand Prix	(Japan) Twin Ring Motegi		(Lithuania) Jurgis Kairys	
XI	1998	Chinese Grand Prix	(China) Changsha, Hunan Province	cancelled/safety		
XII	1999	Honda Japanese Grand Prix	(Japan) Twin Ring Motegi		(Lithuania) Jurgis Kairys	
XIII	1999	Chinese Grand Prix	(China) Zhang Jia Jie, Hunan		(Lithuania) Jurgis Kairys	
XIV	2000	Wuxian Chinese Grand Prix	(China) Lake Tai, Jiangsu		(Lithuania) Jurgis Kairys	
XV	2000	Honda Japanese Grand Prix	(Japan) Twin Ring Motegi		(Hungary) Péter Besenyei	
XVI	2001	Nippon Japanese Grand Prix	(Japan) Twin Ring Motegi		(Hungary) Péter Besenyei	
XVII	2002	Czech Grand Prix	(Czech Republic) Brno		(Germany) Klaus Schrodt	
XVIII	2002	Haute Voltige Aerobatics Japanese Grand Prix	(Japan) Twin Ring Motegi		(Lithuania) Jurgis Kairys	
XIX	2003	Haute Voltige Aerobatics Japanese Grand Prix	(Japan) Twin Ring Motegi	cancelled		
XX	2004	Haute Voltige United Arab Emirates Grand Prix	(United Arab Emirates) Al Ain		(Lithuania) Jurgis Kairys	
XXI	2005	United Arab Emirates Grand Prix	Al Ain Aerobatic Show, United Arab Emirates	Grand Prix of the FAI Centenary	(Germany) Klaus Schrodt	
XXII	2005	Swiss Grand Prix	(Switzerland) Lausanne	FAI Centenary Air Show	(Hungary) Péter Besenyei	
XXIII	2006	United Arab Emirates Grand Prix	(United Arab Emirates) Al Ain Aerobatic Show		(Jordan) Royal Jordanian Falcons	
XXIV	2006	Haute Voltige Aerobatics Japanese Grand Prix	(Japan) Twin Ring Motegi		(Lithuania) Jurgis Kairys	
XXV	2007	Russian Grand Prix	(Russia) LII airfield, Zhukovsky, Moscow Area	Held during the 2007 MAKS Airshow	(Russia) Svetlana Kapanina	
XXVI	2007	Haute Voltige Aerobatics Japanese Grand Prix	(Japan) Twin Ring Motegi		(Russia) Mikhail Mamistov	
XXVII	2008	Haute Voltige Aerobatics Japanese Grand Prix	(Japan) Twin Ring Motegi		(France) Renauld Ecalle	

== See also ==
- Red Bull Air Race
