= Philippines at the 2025 World Games =

- IOC code: PHI
- NOC: Philippine Olympic Committee

in Chengdu, China 7 August 2025 – 17 August 2025
- Competitors: 48 in 11 sports
- Flag bearers: Agatha Wong (wushu); Raphael Trinidad (wakeboarding)
- Medals Ranked 60th: Gold 0 Silver 2 Bronze 2 Total 4

World Games appearances (overview)
- 1981; 1985; 1989; 1993; 1997; 2001; 2005; 2009; 2013; 2017; 2022; 2025

Philippines competed at the 2025 World Games which were held in Chengdu, China from 7 to 17 August 2025.

Stephen Arapoc, president of the Muaythai Association of the Philippines is the chef de mission for the delegation with 48 athletes.

== Medalists ==
| Medal | Name | Sport | Event | Date |
|---|---|---|---|---|
| Silver | Kaila Napolis | Ju-jitsu | Women's 52 kg | 10 August |
| Silver | Chezka Centeno | Billards | Women's ten-ball | 13 August |
| Bronze | Carlos Baylon Jr. | Wushu | Men's sanda 56 kg | 13 August |
| Bronze | Aislinn Yap | Sambo | Women's combat 80 kg | 14 August |

== Competitors ==
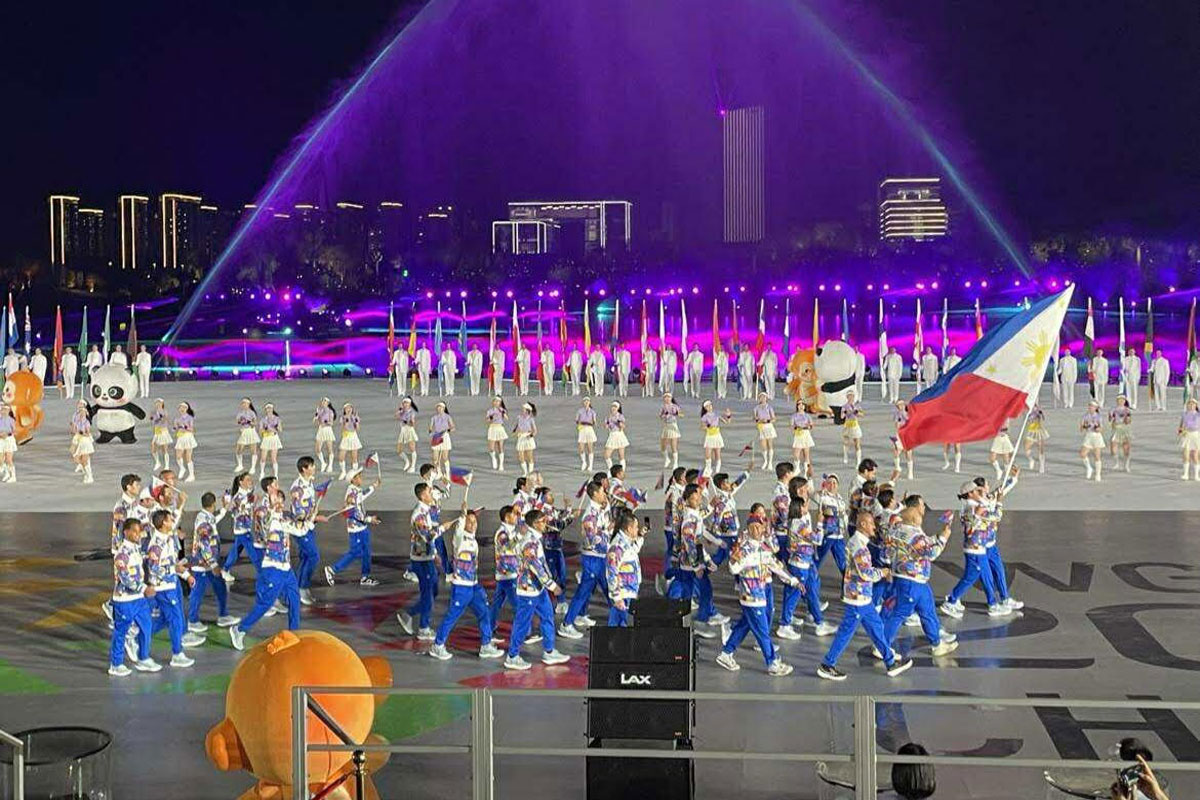
The Philippine delegation at the opening ceremony.

The following is the list of number of competitors in the Games.

| Sport | Men | Women | Total |
|---|---|---|---|
| Billards | 1 | 2 | 3 |
| Dragon boat | 6 | 6 | 12 |
| Duathlon | 3 | 3 | 6 |
| Floorball | 14 | 0 | 14 |
| Ju-jitsu | 0 | 2 | 2 |
| Kickboxing | 0 | 1 | 1 |
| Muaythai | 0 | 1 | 1 |
| Powerlifting | 1 | 1 | 2 |
| Sambo | 0 | 1 | 1 |
| Wakeboarding | 2 | 0 | 2 |
| Wushu | 2 | 2 | 4 |
| Total | 29 | 19 | 48 |

== Dragon boat ==
The Philippines have qualified a berth in the 2025 World Games through its performance in the mixed 10-seater races at the 2024 ICF Dragon Boat World Championships. The Philippine national team under the Philippine Canoe Kayak Federation fielded a 12-rower roster. Most of the teams regular members are military personnel who were barred from participating due to tense China–Philippines diplomatic relations due to the South China Sea dispute. They failed to progress to the final in all four events which had a heats and semifinals phases.

Roster

| Men | Women |
|---|---|
| Jims Vencent Arsenio*; John Rey Barca; Roger Masbate; Roberto Pantaleon; John James Pelagio; Alfred Reformina* | Lealyn Baligasa; Joanna Barca; Roda Daban; Rosalyn Esguerra; Katherine Goesaert; Jonnalyn Quinones |
(*) 10-seater events only

| Team | Event | Heat | | Semifinal | | Final | |
| Team | Event | Result | Rank | Result | Rank | Result | Rank |
|---|---|---|---|---|---|---|---|
| Philippines | Open 8-seater 200m | 50.94 | 6 | Did not advance | | | |
| Philippines | Open 8-seater 500m | 2:13.63 | 6 | Did not advance | | | |
| Philippines | Open 8-seater 2000m | —N/a | | | | 9:37.26 | 9 |
| Philippines | 10-seater 200m | 52.07 | 4 SF | 52.07 | 4 | Did not advance | |
| Philippines | 10-seater 500m | 2:13.08 | 5 SF | 2:11.20 | 4 | Did not advance | |
| Philippines | 10-seater 2000m | —N/a | | | | 9:40.57 | 11 |

== Cue sports ==
Pool

The Philippines have qualified a berth in the 2025 World Games for pool. Rubilen Amit qualified by placing second at the Asian 10-Ball Women's Pool Championships. Jeff de Luna also qualified.

Chezka Centeno won a silver medal, losing to Han Yu of China in the final.

Men

| Athlete | Event | Preliminary round | | | Quarterfinal | Semifinal | Final/BM | Rank |
| Athlete | Event | Opposition Result | Opposition Result | Rank | Opposition Result | Opposition Result | Rank | Rank |
|---|---|---|---|---|---|---|---|---|
| Jeff de Luna | 10-ball | Wu (TPE); L 5–9 | Szolnoki (HUN); L 8–9 | 3 | Did not advance | | | |

Women

| Athlete | Event | Preliminary round | | | Quarterfinal | Semifinal | Final/BM | Rank |
| Athlete | Event | Opposition Result | Opposition Result | Rank | Opposition Result | Opposition Result | Rank | Rank |
|---|---|---|---|---|---|---|---|---|
| Rubilen Amit | 10-ball | Filler (GER); L 4–7 | Liu (CHN); L 4–7 | 3 | Did not advance | | | |
| Chezka Centeno | 10-ball | Easton (USA); W 7–2 | Han (CHN); L 6–7 | 1 Q | Ropero (ESP); W 7–2 | Liu (CHN); W 7–4 | Han (CHN); L 6–7 | 2nd place, silver medalist(s) |

== Duathlon ==
Merry Joy Trupa, Kim Mangrobang and Franklin Yee qualified following their participation at the 2025 Asia Triathlon Duathlon Championships in Manama, Bahrain.

Individual

| Athlete | Event | Run (2.5 km) | Trans 1 | Bike (30 km) | Trans 2 | Run (2.5 km) | Total Time | Rank |
|---|---|---|---|---|---|---|---|---|
| Franklin Yee | Men's | 15:59 | 0:21 | 45:11 | 0:25 | 18:41 | 1:20:37 | 23 |
| Kim Mangrobang | Women's | 19:22 | 0:21 | 51:07 | 0:23 | 20:57 | 1:32:10 | 18 |
| Merry Joy Trupa | Women's | 19:09 | 0:24 | 51:18 | 0:24 | 21:25 | 1:32:40 | 19 |

== Floorball ==
The Philippines qualified their national floorball team via finishing as the best team from Asia-Oceania at the 2024 Men's World Floorball Championships. The Philippines were drawn with Latvia, Sweden, and Switzerland in Group A.

The floorball team are the first Filipino athletes to compete, playing their opening game against Latvia on 7 August. The team lost to Latvia 2–12 and also lost 1–11 to Sweden. They won the 7th place playoff against the hosts, China.

Summary

| Team | Event | Preliminary round | | | | Semifinal | Final / BM / PF | |
| Team | Event | Opposition Result | Opposition Result | Opposition Result | Rank | Opposition Result | Opposition Result | Rank |
|---|---|---|---|---|---|---|---|---|
| Philippines men | Men's tournament | Latvia; L 2–12 | Sweden; L 1–11 | Switzerland; L 0–18 | 4 PF | Did not advance | China; W 14–0 | 7 |

== Ju-jitsu ==
The Philippines have qualified two athletes. Kaila Napolis in the women's 52 kg ne-waza event won the delegation's first medal with a silver medal. Annie Ramirez failed to advance to the semifinals in the 57 kg ne-waza. Ramirez and Napolis failed to medal in the open category.

Women

| Athlete | Event | Elimination round | | | Round of 16 | Quarterfinals | Semifinal | Final/BM | Rank |
| Athlete | Event | Opposition Result | Opposition Result | Rank | Opposition Result | Opposition Result | Opposition Result | Opposition Result | Rank |
|---|---|---|---|---|---|---|---|---|---|
| Kaila Napolis | 52 kg | Alhosani (UAE); W ADV 0–0 | Im (KOR); L ADV 0–0 | 2 Q | —N/a | | Aronov (ISR); W ADV 0–0 | Im (KOR); L ADV 2–2 | 2nd place, silver medalist(s) |
| Kaila Napolis | Open | —N/a | | | Alhosani (UAE); L ADV 0–0 | Did not advance | | | |
| Annie Ramirez | 57 kg | Ganbaatar (MGL); L ADV 0–0 | Marceau (CAN); L 0–2 | 3 | —N/a | | Did not advance | | |
| Annie Ramirez | Open | —N/a | | | Toth (HUN); L ADV 0–0 | Did not advance | | | |

== Kickboxing ==
Hergie Bacyadan qualified for the World Games through the 2024 Asian Kickboxing Championships. He will compete in the women's division. Bacyadan has competed as a boxer at the 2024 Summer Olympics. He finished fourth losing to Aleksandra Krstic in the bronze medal match.

Women

| Athlete | Event | Quarterfinals | Semifinals | Final | |
| Athlete | Event | Opposition Result | Opposition Result | Opposition Result | Rank |
|---|---|---|---|---|---|
| Hergie Bacyadan | K1 -70kg | Keri (HUN); W 3–0 | Dias (POR); L 1–2 | Krstic (SRB); L 1–2 | 4 |

== Muaythai ==
Rudzma Abubakar competed in the women's -48kg division. She started her campaign by winning all three rounds against Anastasiia Mykhailenko of Ukraine in the quarterfinals. However she sustained back spasms during the bout.

In the semifinals, the referee stopped the contest on the second round of Abubakar's fight against Liu Xiaohui of China. Abubakar's nose was dislocated during the fight.

Abubakar therefore advanced to the bronze medal match where she was supposed to fight Oumaima Belouarrat of Morocco. However she forfeited the bout due to her semifinal injury and was forced to go home for medical treatment.

| Athlete | Event | Quarterfinals | Semifinals | Final | |
| Athlete | Event | Opposition Result | Opposition Result | Opposition Result | Rank |
|---|---|---|---|---|---|
| Rudzma Abubakar | Women's 48 kg | Mykhailenko (UKR); W 30–27 | Liu (CHN); L 9–10 RSC | Belouarrat (MAR); L w/o | 4 |

== Powerlifting ==
The Philippines have qualified two athletes.

| Athlete | Event | Final | | | Total lifted | Total points | Rank |
| Athlete | Event | Squat | Bench press | Deadlift | Total lifted | Total points | Rank |
|---|---|---|---|---|---|---|---|
| Regie Ramirez | Men's equipped lightweight | 245.0 | 155.0 | 262.5 | 662.5 | 96.70 | 8 |
| Joyce Gail Reboton | Women's equipped super heavyweight | 240.0 | 147.5 | 207.5 | 595.0 | 94.52 | 6 |

== Sambo ==
Aislinn Agnes Yap took part in the women's combat 80kg division. She lost to Ulbossyn Adilova of Kazakhstan in the opening seimifinals before earning a bronze after defeating Nicole Castro of Costa Rica.

| Athlete | Event | Quarterfinals | Semifinals | Final | |
| Athlete | Event | Opposition Result | Opposition Result | Opposition Result | Rank |
|---|---|---|---|---|---|
| Aislinn Agnes Yap | Combat 80kg | Bye | Adilova (KAZ); L 0–2 | Castro (CRC); W 3–1 | 3rd place, bronze medalist(s) |

== Wakeboarding ==
The Philippines have qualified two athletes.

Raphael Trinidad advanced to the final in cable wakeboard. Eric Ordoñez finished his skim wakeboarding campaign in the semifinal in fifth place. Only the top three advanced to the final.

| Athlete | Event | Heat | | Semifinal | | Final | |
| Athlete | Event | Result | Rank | Result | Rank | Result | Rank |
|---|---|---|---|---|---|---|---|
| Raphael Trinidad | Cable Wakeboard | 80.20 | 3 Q | 70.80 | 3 Q | 56.60 | 4 |
| Eric Ordoñez | Skim | 36.67 | 2 Q | 40.00 | 5 | Did not advance | |

== Wushu ==
The Philippines have qualified three athletes in wushu. Five-time SEA Games gold medalist, Agatha Wong finished seventh in the women's taijiquan\taijijian event.

=== Men's ===
Taijiquan\Taijijian

| Athlete | Event | Taijiquan | | Taijijian | | Total | |
| Athlete | Event | Result | Rank | Result | Rank | Result | Rank |
|---|---|---|---|---|---|---|---|
| Jones Llabres Inso | Taijiquan\Taijijian All-Round | 9.706 | 6 | 9.406 | 7 | 19.112 | 7 |

Sanda

| Athlete | Event | Quarterfinals | Semifinals | Final | |
| Athlete | Event | Opposition Result | Opposition Result | Opposition Result | Rank |
|---|---|---|---|---|---|
| Carlos Baylon Jr. | -56 kg | Abdurashitov (UZB); W 2–0 | Tang (CHN); L WPD | Karimov (UZB); W 2–0 | 3rd place, bronze medalist(s) |

=== Women's ===
Taijiquan\Taijijian

| Athlete | Event | Taijiquan | | Taijijian | | Total | |
| Athlete | Event | Result | Rank | Result | Rank | Result | Rank |
|---|---|---|---|---|---|---|---|
| Agatha Wong | Taijiquan\Taijijian All-Round | 9.160 | 8 | 9.706 | 4 | 18.866 | 7 |

Sanda

| Athlete | Event | Quarterfinals | Semifinals | Final | |
| Athlete | Event | Opposition Result | Opposition Result | Opposition Result | Rank |
|---|---|---|---|---|---|
| Krizan Faith Collado | -52 kg | Sirto (ITA); W 2–0 | Batra (IND); L 0–2 | Ngô (VIE); L WPD | 4 |
