= Philippines men's national floorball team results =

This article details the international fixtures and results of the Philippines men's national floorball team.

== 2025 ==
7 August 2025; 9:00 UTC+8	Latvia	2–12 (2–1, 4–0, 6–1)	Philippines	Xindu Xiangcheng Sports Centre, Chengdu

Game reference
Referees: Glenn Boström; Håkan Söderman

2025 World Games

9 August 2025; 11:45 UTC+8	Philippines	1–11 (0–2, 1–5, 0–4)	Sweden	Xindu Xiangcheng Sports Centre, Chengdu

Game reference

2025 World Games

10 August 2025; 15:00 UTC+8	Switzerland	18–0	Philippines	Xindu Xiangcheng Sports Centre, Chengdu

2025 World Games

12 August 2025; 10:30 UTC+8	Philippines	14–0	China	Xindu Xiangcheng Sports Centre, Chengdu

2025 World Games

== 2024 ==
21 May 2024; 16:00 UTC+8	New Zealand	2–4 (0–2, 1–0, 1–2)	Philippines	PhilSports Arena, Pasig; Attendance: 448

Game reference

Referees:
Omar Edar (Malaysia)
Nuraidi Anuar (Malaysia)

	0–1	Lucas Öijvall Perez 01:36
	0–2	Melvin Alm Mendoza 12:04 (PS)
Pavol Neki 29:57	1–2
	1–3	Lucas Werelius 41:55
	1–4	Melvin Alm Mendoza 52:27
Coby Crafar 59:27	2–4

2024 IFF Men's World Floorball Championships Qualifications · AOFC

22 May 2024; 16:00 UTC+8	South Korea	4–12 (1–4, 3–6, 0–2)	Philippines	PhilSports Arena, Pasig; Attendance: 424

Game reference

Referees:
Sharil Ismail (Singapore)
Oswind Rosayro (Singapore)

	0–1	John Callenryd De la Pena 01:44
	0–2	Mattiece Cortez Myllyperkio 01:59
	0–3	Simon Sicat Larano 10:06
	0–4	Melvin Alm Mendoza 10:48 (PS)
Hoon Dong Cho 18:50 (PP)	1–4
	1–5	Simon Andersson 21:19
	1–6	Lucas Werelius 22:41
	1–7	Melvin Alm Mendoza 24:25
Eu Sung Lee 32:31 (PP)	2–7
Gwan Mook Ryu 34:48	3–7
	3–8	Michael Hedblom 36:30
	3–9	Melvin Alm Mendoza 37:22
Hoon Dong Cho 39:02	4–9
	4–10	Melvin Alm Mendoza 39:44
	4–11	Lucas Werelius 46:46
	4–12	Melvin Alm Mendoza 51:52

2024 IFF Men's World Floorball Championships Qualifications · AOFC

23 May 2024; 16:00 UTC+8	Philippines	3–8 (1–3, 1–2, 1–3)	Thailand	PhilSports Arena, Pasig; Attendance: 532

Game reference

Referees:
Sharil Ismail (Singapore)
Oswind Rosayro (Singapore)

	0–1	Anucha Wong-art 11:37
Melvin Alm Mendoza 14:59 (PS)	1–1
	1–2	Simon Johansson 15:58
	1–3	Simon Johansson 19:54
	1–4	Pheeraphong Khambanlue 22:56
Lucas Werelius 28:52	2–4
	2–5	Veerasak Pimpa 37:49
	2–6	Simon Johansson 41:09
Ludwig Hemmingberg Porral 57:01	3–6
	3–7	Oscar Snell 59:02
	3–8	Pawat Thaidit 59:50 (EN)

2024 IFF Men's World Floorball Championships Qualifications · AOFC

24 May 2024; 16:00 UTC+8	Australia	3–5 (1–2, 2–2, 0–1)	Philippines	PhilSports Arena, Pasig; Attendance: 617

Referees:
Sharil Ismail (Singapore)
Oswind Rosayro (Singapore)

Daniel Gartner 06:24	1–0
	1–1	Melvin Alm Mendoza 16:34
	1–2	Lucas Werelius 18:35
	1–3	Ludvig Hemmingberg Porral 25:26
Liam Perry 29:25	2–3
	2–4	Lucas Werelius 31:48
Christian Newland 18:35	3–4
	3–5	Melvin Alm Mendoza 59:41

2024 IFF Men's World Floorball Championships Qualifications · AOFC

25 May 2024; 15:00 UTC+8	Philippines	6–5 (2–2, 1–1, 3–2)	Thailand	PhilSports Arena, Pasig; Attendance: 862

Game reference

Referees:
Sharil Ismail (Singapore)
Oswind Rosayro (Singapore)

Simon Sicat Larano 09:49	1–0
	1–1	Simon Johansson 10:37
	1–2	Pawat Thaidit 13:53 (PP)
Lucas Werelius 19:26 (PP)	2–2
	2–3	Santipong Sukkasem 34:02
Simon Sicat Larano 37:48	3–3
	3–4	Lukas Hubinette Phraiwan 42:58
Kim Varga Franz 43:32	4–4
Melvin Alm Mendoza 48:43	5–4
	5–5	Lukas Hubinette Phraiwan 51:01
Lucas Werelius 53:40	6–5

2024 IFF Men's World Floorball Championships Qualifications · AOFC

8 December 2024; 14:00 UTC+1	Australia	2–6 (2–0, 0–3, 0–3)	Philippines	Baltic Hall, Malmö; Attendance: 317

Game reference

2024 IFF Men's World Floorball Championships

9 December 2024; 13:45 UTC+1	Philippines	5–6 (1–3, 3–2, 1–1)	Estonia	Baltic Hall, Malmö; Attendance: 377

Game reference

2024 IFF Men's World Floorball Championships

10 December 2024; 11:00 UTC+1	Canada	3–4	Philippines	Baltic Hall, Malmö

Game reference

2024 IFF Men's World Floorball Championships

11 December 2024; 12:30 UTC+1	Latvia	14–3 (–, –, –)	Philippines	Malmö Arena, Malmö

Game reference

2024 IFF Men's World Floorball Championships

13 December 2024; 10:45 UTC+1	Philippines	9–8 OT (2–4, 3–3, 3–1); OT: 1–0	Poland	Baltiska Hallen, Malmö

Game reference

2024 IFF Men's World Floorball Championships

== 2023 ==
12 May 2023; 17:45 UTC+7	Philippines	6–4 (2–2, 2–0, 2–2)	Thailand	Dinosaur Park Hall, Phnom Penh; Attendance: 150

Game reference

Referees:
Calvin Lim (Malaysia)
Jaey Jetpuria (Malaysia)

	0–1	Santipong Sukkasem 03:58 (PP)
	0–2	Pheeraphong Khambanlue 04:19
Melvin Alm Mendoza 08:08	1–2
Mattiece Cortez Myllyperkio 10:41	2–2
Simon Sicat Larano 16:09	3–2
Melvin Alm Mendoza 21:58	4–2
	4–3	Simon Johansson 31:12
	4–4	Theerawat Noisai 36:34
Lucas Werelius 39:40 (PP)	5–4
Ludvig Hemmingberg Porral 40:46	6–4

2023 Southeast Asian Games

13 May 2023; 13:15 UTC+7	Malaysia	3–8 (1–3, 1–4, 1–1)	Philippines	Dinosaur Park Hall; Attendance: 200

Game reference

Referees:
Oswind Rosayro (Singapore)
Sharil Ismail (Singapore)

	0–1	Simon Sicat Larano 07:05
	0–2	Simon Sicat Larano 08:56
	0–3	Mattiece Cortez Myllyperkio 10:52
Benedict Yeoh Chun Kit 12:58 (PP)	1–3
	1–4	Simon Sicat Larano 15:35
Tristan James Desmond 19:38	2–4
	2–5	Kim Varga Franz 22:03 (PP)
	2–6	Melvin Alm Mendoza 22:53
	2–7	Michael Hedblom 29:44
	2–8	Melvin Alm Mendoza 40:05 (PP)
Eugene Lai Yi Qin 40:33	3–8

2023 Southeast Asian Games

14 May 2023; 13:15 UTC+7	Philippines	2–1 (0–1, 1–0, 1–0)	Singapore	Dinosaur Park Hall; Attendance: 300

Game reference

Referees:
Calvin Lim (Malaysia)
Jaey Jetpuria (Malaysia)

	0–1	Wee Guan Nicholas Chua 11:05
Fredrik Jeppsson Escabel 25:29	1–1
Melvin Alm Mendoza 34:06 (PS)	2–1

2023 Southeast Asian Games

15 May 2023; 17:45 UTC+7	Cambodia	3–13 (1–5, 1–3, 1–4)	Philippines	Dinosaur Park Hall; Attendance: 100

Game reference

Referees:
Oswind Rosayro (Singapore)
Sharil Ismail (Singapore)

	0–1	Melvin Alm Mendoza 04:50
	0–2	Kim Varga Franz 07:10 (SH)
	0–3	John Alicante Embile 07:52 (SH)
	0–4	Kim Varga Franz 10:08
	0–5	Melvin Alm Mendoza 12:36
Mengly Leap 12:50	1–5
Mengly Leap 17:42	2–5
	2–6	Melvin Alm Mendoza 19:32
	2–7	Melvin Alm Mendoza 28:09
	2–8	Michael Hedblom 28:49
	2–9	Michael Hedblom 34:15
	2–10	Ludvig Hemmingberg Porral 36:23 (ESH)
	2–11	John Alicante Embile 39:18
	2–12	Melvin Alm Mendoza 39:50
	2–13	Melvin Alm Mendoza 42:27
Matti Eronen 44:09	3–13

2023 Southeast Asian Games

16 May 2023; 18:00 UTC+7	Philippines	2–3 (0–0, 1–0, 1–3)	Thailand	Dinosaur Park Hall; Attendance: 600

Game reference

Referees:
Oswind Rosayro (Singapore)
Sharil Ismail (Singapore)

Kim Varga Franz 20:58	1–0
	1–1	Simon Johansson 30:46 (PP)
Melvin Alm Mendoza 32:07	2–1
	2–2	Santipong Sukkasem 36:07
	2–3	Simon Johansson 39:10

2023 Southeast Asian Games

9 October 2023; 13:30 UTC+8	Philippines	0–13 (0–5, 0–4, 0–4)	South Korea	Our Tampines Hub, Tampines, Singapore; Attendance: 467

Game reference

Referees:
Oswind Rosayro (Singapore)
Sharil Ismail (Singapore)

0–1	Eu Sung Lee 01:47
0–2	Tae Min Han 06:51
0–3	Bin Woo 16:00
0–4	Tae Min Han 16:55
0–5	Tae Min Han 19:56
0–6	Sang Hoon Lee 21:02
0–7	Eu Sung Lee 23:50
0–8	Tae Min Han 25:07
0–9	Chang Hun Park 36:00
0–10	Seong Min Kim 41:13
0–11	Seong Min Kim 44:45
0–12	Han Sol Bae 49:56
0–13	Yong Hun Jo 56:25

2023 AOFC Cup

10 October 2023; 13:30 UTC+8	Malaysia	2–1 (0–1, 2–0, 0–0)	Philippines	Our Tampines Hub, Tampines, Singapore; Attendance: 322

Game reference

Referees:
Fauzan Shafii (Singapore)
Shairazi Sidek (Singapore)

	0–1	Hazzer Talingdan 02:03
Derric Kuan Zhen Jie 34:29	1–1
Muhd Nur Faris Mohd Saleh 35:54	2–1

2023 AOFC Cup

11 October 2023; 18:30 UTC+8	Philippines	0–21 (0–7, 0–7, 0–7)	Singapore	Our Tampines Hub, Tampines, Singapore; Attendance: 718

Game reference

Referees:
Nuraidi Anuar (Malaysia)
Omar Edar (Malaysia)

0–1	Muhammad Fattah Barin 00:20
0–2	Muhammad Darwish Aiman Azmi 02:58
0–3	Muhammad Fattah Barin 03:32
0–4	Gabriel Kin Kay Chan 03:42
0–5	Suria R 04:48
0–6	Juin Jie Ng 12:31
0–7	Jun Wei Foo 16:16
0–8	Muhammad Haziq Abdul Wahab 21:31
0–9	Azhari Saputra Mustafa 22:37
0–10	Muhammad Fattah Barin 23:38
0–11	Muhammad Darwish Aiman Azmi 26:14
0–12	Azhari Saputra Mustafa 31:35
0–13	Jian Hong Lim 33:10
0–14	Mohamad Haris Abdul 35:38
0–15	Juin Jie Ng 42:31
0–16	Suria R 54:45 (PP)
0–17	Nicholas Low 57:42
0–18	Keanen Poone 58:05 (PS)
0–19	Azhari Saputra Mustafa 58:36
0–20	Muhammad Darwish Aiman Azmi 58:40
0–21	Tze Wen Thaddeus Tan 59:37

2023 AOFC Cup

12 October 2023; 19:00 UTC+8	New Zealand	3–0 (1–0, 1–0, 1–0)	Philippines	Our Tampines Hub, Tampines, Singapore; Attendance: 656

Game reference

Referees:
Nuraidi Anuar (Malaysia)
Omar Edar (Malaysia)

Hagan Macfadyen 19:15	1–0
Aston Ash 29:41	2–0
Alec Stewart 42:12	3–0

2023 AOFC Cup

13 October 2023; 13:00 UTC+8	Malaysia	3–4 PSO (0–2, 0–0, 2–0); 0–0 OT; 1–2 PSO	Philippines	Our Tampines Hub, Tampines, Singapore; Attendance: 535

Game reference

Referees:
Fauzan Shafii (Singapore)
Shairazi Sidek (Singapore)

	0–1	Yrvin Ryan Gelangre 10:10 (SH)
	0–2	Yrvin Ryan Gelangre 12:22
Ammar Uzayr Zahidi 55:29 (PP)	1–2
Ammar Uzayr Zahidi 57:56	2–2

Rax Ch´ng Xue Ken min
Penalties
Edwin Borja
Lucas Oijvall Perez min

2023 AOFC Cup

== 2022 ==
21 May 2022; 14:20 UTC+2	Philippines	1–8 (0–1, 0–4, 1–3)	Thailand	IFU Arena, Uppsala; Attendance: 342

Game reference

Referees:
David Geiser (Sweden)
Henrik Nilsson (Sweden)

	0–1	Aphichet Ratanaprathum 14:59
	0–2	Simon Johansson 16:13
	0–3	Pawat Thaidit 19:04
	0–4	Franz Nattapat Kerdsawangwong 20:58
	0–5	Pawat Thaidit 21:37
	0–6	Alexander Rinefalk 33:35
Fredrik Jeppsson Escabel 38:44	1–6
	1–7	Aphichet Ratanaprathum 39:59
	1–8	Pawat Thaidit 44:55

International Match

31 May 2022; 11:00 UTC+8	South Korea	2–3 (1–0, 0–2, 1–1)	Philippines	OCBC Arena; Attendance: 99

Game reference

Referees:
Sharil Ismail (Singapore)
Oswind Rosayro (Singapore)

Rasmus Jansson 08:34	1–0
	1–1	Rhodell Esguerra 18:44
	1–2	Melvin Alm Mendoza 19:48
	1–3	Christian Schoultze Castrillo 33:57 (PP)
Max Parbrand 41:08	2–3

2022 IFF Men's World Floorball Championships Qualifications · AOFC

1 June 2022; 11:00 UTC+8	Japan	4–10 (3–4, 1–3, 0–3)	Philippines	OCBC Arena; Attendance: 96

Game reference

Referees:
Lee Young June (South Korea)
Shin Jong Suk (South Korea)

Kenta Ramsauer 04:08	1–0
	1–1	Melvin Alm Mendoza 04:46
	1–2	Rhodell Esguerra 07:13
	1–3	Melvin Alm Mendoza 07:57
Shin Nakamura 09:17	2–3
	2–4	Kim Franz Varga 10:23
Shin Nakamura 11:06	3–4
Hiroto Moriya 20:36	4–4
	4–5	Fredrik Escabel 20:58
	4–6	Melvin Alm Mendoza 25:10 (SH)
	4–7	Ludvig Hemmingberg Porral 27:40 (PP)
	4–8	Ludvig Hemmingberg Porral 35:27 (PP)
	4–9	Kim Franz Varga 40:44 (SH)
	4–10	Melvin Alm Mendoza 41:22 (SH)

2022 IFF Men's World Floorball Championships Qualifications · AOFC

2 June 2022; 16:00 UTC+8	Philippines	4–2 (1–1, 2–0, 1–1)	Australia	OCBC Arena; Attendance: 267

Game reference

Referees:
Sharil Ismail (Singapore)
Oswind Rosayro (Singapore)

	0–1	Daniel Gartner 05:53
Melvin Alm Mendoza 13:21 (SH)	1–1
Lucas Oijvall Perez 19:46 (PP)	2–1
27:42 (OG)	3–1
Kim Franz Varga 33:32 (PP)	4–1
	4–2	Tomas Gartner 33:36

2022 IFF Men's World Floorball Championships Qualifications · AOFC

4 June 2022; 18:30 UTC+8	Philippines	4–6 (1–0, 0–3, 3–3)	Thailand	OCBC Arena; Attendance: 2,383

Game reference

Referees:
Sharil Ismail (Singapore)
Oswind Rosayro (Singapore)

Kim Franz Varga 02:27	1–0
	1–1	Surapong Sangmongkhol 24:09 (SH)
	1–2	Pawat Thaidit 26:48
	1–3	Veerasak Pimpa 29:18
	1–4	Surapong Sangmongkhol 29:18
Ludvig Hemmingberg Porral 36:50 (PP)	2–4
	2–5	Pawat Thaidit 40:16
41:02 (OG)	3–5
	3–6	Alexander Rinefalk 43:04 (PP)
Melvin Alm Mendoza 43:47 (WG)	4–6

2022 IFF Men's World Floorball Championships Qualifications · AOFC

6 November 2022; 20:00 UTC+2	Philippines	2–9 (1–2, 0–2, 1–5)	Poland	Swiss Life Arena, Zurich, Switzerland; Attendance: 722

Game reference

Referees:
Sharil Ismail (Singapore)
Oswind Rosayro (Singapore)

	0–1	Lucas Dahlstrom 13:22
Lucas Werelius 14:01	1–1
	1–2	Lukasz Sadolewski 18:45
	1–3	Mateusz Antoniak 33:16
	1–4	Michal Sienko 37:07
	1–5	Kacper Szalanski 42:35
	1–6	Lukasz Chlebda 44:12
Melvin Alm Mendoza 50:12 (PP)	2–6
	2–7	Lucas Dahlstrom 50:40
	2–8	Jakub Lyskawa 53:10
	2–9	Michal Sienko 59:23 (PP)

2022 IFF Men's World Floorball Championships

7 November 2022; 13:00 UTC+2	Australia	6–2 (0–2, 2–0, 4–0)	Philippines	Swiss Life Arena, Zurich, Switzerland; Attendance: 2967

Game reference

Referees:
Janne Sjogren (Finland)
Thomas Ellis (Finland)

	0–1	Melvin Alm Mendoza 03:36 (PP)
	0–2	Lucas Werelius 10:59
Christian Newland 21:52	1–2
Tomas Gartner 29:26 (PP)	2–2
Kade Ebeling 41:31	3–2
Christian Newland 45:36	4–2
Jamie Doyle 58:29 (EN)	5–2
Liam Perry 59:14 (EN)	6–2

2022 IFF Men's World Floorball Championships

8 November 2022; 10:00 UTC+2	Denmark	14–3 (7–2, 2–1, 5–0)	Philippines	Swiss Life Arena, Zurich, Switzerland; Attendance: 1682

Game reference

Referees:
Maris Kumerdanks (Latvia)
Kaspars Kristapsons (Latvia)

Mathias Glass 04:48	1–0
Eddie Sandberg 02:53	2–0
Daniel Hedegaard 04:59	3–0
Mathias Glass 05:27	4–0
	4–1	Melvin Alm Mendoza 07:42 (PP)
Mathias Glass 12:05	5–1
Frederik Kobberup 13:17	6–1
	6–2	Melvin Alm Mendoza 17:08
Eddie Sandberg 18:51	7–2
Mathias Glass 20:57	8–2
Jannik Dalkvist 21:27	9–2
	9–3	Earl John Alicante Alicante Embile 35:57
Mathias Glass 45:55	10–3
Emil Kajgaard 46:27	11–3
Mathias Glass 53:21 (PP)	12–3
Axel Rasmussen 55:38	13–3
Mathias Mortensen 59:38	14–3

2022 IFF Men's World Floorball Championships

10 November 2022; 10:00 UTC+2	Thailand	10–6 (4–0, 3–4, 3–2)	Philippines	Swiss Life Arena, Zurich, Switzerland; Attendance: 1682

Game reference

Referees:
Sharil Ismail (Singapore)
Oswind Rosayro (Singapore)

Simon Johansson 03:17 (PS)	1–0
Veerasak Pimpa 06:59	2–0
Surapong Sangmongkhol 15:06	3–0
Prakasit Namsawang 15:50	4–0
Jeerayut Yaemyim 22:09 (PP)	5–0
	5–1	Melvin Alm Mendoza 23:58
Aphichet Ratanaprathum 24:17	6–1
Jeerayut Yaemyim 27:22	7–1
	7–2	Kim Varga Franz 31:44 (PP)
	7–3	Simon Andersson 32:32 (PP)
	7–4	Melvin Alm Mendoza 35:10 (ESH)
	7–5	Ludvig Hemmingberg Porral 41:29 (PP)
Jeerayut Yaemyim 43:57 (PP)	8–5
	8–6	Melvin Alm Mendoza 44:37
Simon Johansson 55:50 (PP)	9–6
Pawat Thaidit 59:36 (EN)	10–6

2022 IFF Men's World Floorball Championships

11 November 2022; 12:00 UTC+2	Singapore	5–6 OT (0–1, 3–1, 2–3); 0–1 OT	Philippines	Swiss Life Arena, Zurich, Switzerland; Attendance: 4402

Game reference

Referees:
Jakub Furmanek (Czechia)
Vlastimil Solc (Czechia)

	0–1	Melvin Alm Mendoza 02:53
Jia Qing Cheang 30:24	1–1
	1–2	Melvin Alm Mendoza 30:42
Suria R 32:30	2–2
Thaddeus Tze Wen Tan 34:24	3–2
	3–3	Kim Varga Franz 43:52
	3–4	Ludvig Hemmingberg Porral 45:51 (PP)
Vignesa Pasupathy 51:47	4–4
Thaddeus Tze Wen Tan 52:38 (PP)	5–4
	5–5	Fredrik Jeppsson Escabel 57:32 (WG)
	5–6	Melvin Alm Mendoza 61:11

2022 IFF Men's World Floorball Championships

== 2021 ==
4 December 2021; 12:00 UTC+3	Philippines	6–13 (0–3, 2–7, 4–3)	Estonia	Helsinki Ice Hall 2 Attendance: 301

Game reference

Referees:
Sharil Ismail (Singapore)
Oswind Rosayro (Singapore)

	0–1	Patrik Kareliusson 02:34
	0–2	Mathias Einamann 04:32
	0–3	Tanel Kasenurm 19:18
	0–4	Tanel Kasenurm 21:51
	0–5	Patrik Kareliusson 22:16
	0–6	Tanel Kasenurm 23:20
	0–7	Alexander Dahlberg 23:32
	0–8	Patrik Kareliusson 33:36
	0–9	Tanel Kasenurm 35:01
	0–10	Patrik Markus 35:16
Fredrik Jeppsson Escabel 37:12	1–10
Ryan Hallden Cater 37:40	2–10
Simon Andersson 44:08 (PP)	3–10
Fredrik Jeppsson Escabel 46:36	4–10
Christian Schoultze Castrillo 50:38	5–10
Simon Andersson 52:47 (PP)	6–10
	6–11	Oliver Savi 55:20
	6–12	Patrik Kareliusson 57:24 (PP)
	6–13	Tanel Kasenurm 58:20

2020 IFF Men's World Floorball Championships

5 December 2021; 12:00 UTC+3	Singapore	4–9 (0–5, 1–1, 3–3)	Philippines	Helsinki Ice Hall 2 Attendance: 295

Game reference

Referees:
Hakan Soderman (Sweden)
Glenn Boström (Sweden)

	0–1	Melvin Alm Mendoza 04:07
	0–2	Lucas Oijvall Perez 04:33
	0–3	Melvin Alm Mendoza 09:54
	0–4	Ryan Hallden Cater 18:43
	0–5	Melvin Alm Mendoza 19:17
Hafiz Subir 28:18	1–5
	1–6	Melvin Alm Mendoza 29:58
Chee Yong Lee 43:14	2–6
	2–7	Lucas Oijvall Perez 45:13
Thaddeus Tze Wen Tan 45:31	3–7
Suria R 53:13 (PP)	4–7
	4–8	Melvin Alm Mendoza 57:08
	4–9	Kim Varga Franz 58:25 (EN)

2020 IFF Men's World Floorball Championships

6 December 2021; 13:00 UTC+3	Canada	13–8 (6–3, 4–3, 3–2)	Philippines	Helsinki Ice Hall; Attendance: 306

Game reference

Referees:
Sandra Zurbuchen (Switzerland)
Corina Wehinger (Switzerland)

	0–1	Melvin Alm Mendoza 01:52 (PS)
	0–2	Ryan Hallden Cater 02:08
Brandon Barber 04:42 (PS)	1–2
Valtteri Viitakoski 08:46	2–2
Cameron Buck 11:39	3–2
	3–3	Melvin Alm Mendoza 12:15
Valtteri Viitakoski 17:25	4–3
Brandon Barber 18:18	5–3
Tristan Walsh 19:49	6–3
Taylor Walsh 23:07	7–3
	7–4	Rhodell Esguerra 25:19
	7–5	Fredrik Jeppsson Escabel 26:29 (PP)
	7–6	Fredrik Jeppsson Escabel 31:43 (PP)
Valtteri Viitakoski 32:12	8–6
Brandon Barber 33:16	9–6
Brandon Barber 36:03	10–6
	10–7	Melvin Alm Mendoza 40:25
Lauri Berg 47:35 (PP)	11–7
Valtteri Viitakoski 54:15	12–7
	12–8	Christian Schoultze Castrillo 55:59
Valtteri Viitakoski 59:09 (EN)	13–8

2020 IFF Men's World Floorball Championships

7 December 2021; 14:30 UTC+3	Philippines	10–5 (4–3, 2–1, 4–1)	United States	Helsinki Ice Hall 2 Attendance: 101

Game reference

Referees:
Sharil Ismail (Singapore)
Oswind Rosayro (Singapore)

Lucas Werelius 00:45	1–0
Lucas Werelius 02:52	2–0
Kim Varga Franz 04:25	3–0
Fredrik Jeppsson Escabel 04:34	4–0
	4–1	William Eriksson 09:37
	4–2	Axel Olson Holm 14:15 (PP)
	4–3	Alexander McVey 15:12 (PP)
Melvin Alm Mendoza 27:46 (PS)	5–3
	5–4	Erik Haghjoo 33:16
Simon Andersson 38:35	6–4
Fredrik Dahmen Cantos 41:16	7–4
Melvin Alm Mendoza 44:24	8–4
Melvin Alm Mendoza 49:21	9–4
Kim Varga Franz 50:22	10–4
	10–5	William Eriksson 53:33 (PS)

2020 IFF Men's World Floorball Championships

8 December 2021; 17:00 UTC+3	Philippines	8–9 PSO (2–3, 2–1, 4–4); 0–0 OT; 1–2 PSO	Thailand	Helsinki Ice Hall 2 Attendance: 128

Game reference

Referees:
Hakan Soderman (Sweden)
Glenn Boström (Sweden)

	0–1	Pawat Thaidit 00:42
	0–2	Prakasit Namsawang 07:21
	0–3	Pheeraphong Khambanlue 15:12 (PP)
Melvin Alm Mendoza 12:03	1–3
Melvin Alm Mendoza 19:49	2–3
Rhodell Esguerra 23:20	3–3
Simon Andersson 23:36	4–3
	4–4	Santipong Sukkasem 34:41
Kim Varga Franz 42:05	5–4
Kim Varga Franz 44:23 (PP)	6–4
	6–5	Pawat Thaidit 45:57 (PP)
Kim Varga Franz 49:11	7–5
	7–6	Theerawat Noisai 52:28
	7–7	Pawat Thaidit 53:09
	7–8	Jeerayut Yaemyim 55:02
Ryan Hallden Cater 58:30	8–8
	8–9	Chusak Narkprasert 70:00 (PS)
	8–10	Alexander Rinefalk 70:00 (PS)
Fredrik Dahmen Cantos 70:00 (PS)	9–10

2020 IFF Men's World Floorball Championships

== 2019 ==
7 July 2019; 16:03 UTC+8	Philippines	5–4 (1–1, 3–3, 1–0)	India	Alonte Sports Arena, Biñan; Attendance: 160

Game reference

Referees:
Young June Lee (South Korea)
Jong Suk Shin (South Korea)

	0–1	Vishal Kachhap 04:55
Ryan Hallden 07:05 (PS)	1–1
Ryan Hallden 24:39	2–1
Patrik Schoultze 31:34	3–1
	3–2	Palash Garg 32:56
Ryan Hallden 35:44	4–2
	4–3	Yash Rodwal 36:11
	4–4	Ankit Dalal 36:47
Ryan Hallden 44:05	5–4

2019 AOFC Cup

8 July 2019; 19:00 UTC+8	Singapore	17–2 (2–0, 7–0, 8–2)	Philippines	Alonte Sports Arena, Biñan; Attendance: 359

Game reference

Referees:
Young June Lee (South Korea)
Jong Suk Shin (South Korea)

Farhan Yusoff 13:07	1–0
Muhammad Akmal Shaharudin 14:02	2–0
Zong Wei Tng 28:54	3–0
Suria R 32:32	4–0
Chun Yin Yeung 33:13	5–0
Muhammad Akmal Shaharudin 33:44	6–0
Suria R 34:03	7–0
Juin Jie Ng 37:17	8–0
Zong Wei Tng 37:20	9–0
	9–1	Ralph Andrew Ramos 42:05
Li Yang Chan 47:14	10–1
Zong Wei Tng 48:33	11–1
Muhammad Akmal Shaharudin 49:31	12–1
Joshua Seow 50:11	13–1
Zong Wei Tng 50:42	14–1
Muhammad Haziq Abdul Wahab 54:10	15–1
Jenmark Sorreda 54:32	16–1
Zong Wei Tng 57:12	17–1
	17–2	Christian Schoultze 58:26

2019 AOFC Cup

9 July 2019; 19:00 UTC+8	Japan	3–5 (2–3, 0–2, 1–0)	Philippines	Alonte Sports Arena, Biñan; Attendance: 271

Game reference

Referees:
Fajar Hidayat (Indonesia)
Yongky Priyanto (Indonesia)

Kouhei Wada 05:10	1–0
	1–1	Patrik Schoultze 12:24
	1–2	Ryan Hallden 15:14 (SH)
	1–3	Alexander Warendh 16:52
Mitsutoshi Hara 19:02 (PP)	2–3
	2–4	Ryan Hallden 31:00
	2–5	Patrik Schoultze 37:41 (PP)
Daiya Wakasa 52:46	3–5

2019 AOFC Cup

10 July 2019; 17:30 UTC+8	Philippines	5–4 (2–1, 2–1, 1–2)	Malaysia	Alonte Sports Arena, Biñan; Attendance: 351

Game reference

Referees:
Young June Lee (South Korea)
Jong Suk Shin (South Korea)

Patrik Schoultze 07:18 (PP)	1–0
	1–1	Ter Min Chiam 16:43
Jan Vitaliano 18:58	2–1
	2–2	Iman Nazirul Fitri Wagiman 28:02
Christian Schoultze 39:13	3–2
Alexander Warendh 39:51	4–2
	4–3	Ter Min Chiam 45:43 (WG)
	4–4	Tristan Desmond Dass 54:41
Ryan Hallden 59:58	5–4

2019 AOFC Cup

10 July 2019; 19:00 UTC+8	Thailand	13–7 (4–1, 3–2, 6–4)	Philippines	Alonte Sports Arena, Biñan; Attendance: 555

Game reference

Referees:
Sharil Ismail (Singapore)
Oswind Rosayro (Singapore)

	0–1	Jan Vitaliano 03:33
Chusak Narkprasert 04:32	1–1
Khemmathat Chummak 13:19 (PP)	2–1
Pitsanu Kannala 16:01	3–1
Watcharapon Onsuk 16:34	4–1
	4–2	Lucas Öijvall Perez 29:11
Watcharapon Onsuk 29:20	5–2
	5–3	Jan Vitaliano 29:52
Watcharapon Onsuk 32:14 (PP)	6–3
Nattawut Dueankhao 34:51 (PP)	7–3
Chusak Narkprasert 43:30 (PP)	8–3
Weerawat Singthong 44:23	9–3
	9–4	Alexander Warendh 46:43
	9–5	Ryan Hallden 47:22
Pitsanu Kannala 50:27	10–5
Surapong Sangmongkhol 50:55	11–5
	11–6	Ryan Hallden 52:25
Veerasak Pimpa 58:36	12–6
Nattawut Dueankhao 58:48	13–6
	13–7	Luis Manila 59:05

2019 AOFC Cup

12 July 2019; 15:00 UTC+8	Philippines	6–5 OT (1–2, 1–1, 3–2); 1–0 OT	South Korea	Alonte Sports Arena, Biñan; Attendance: 414

Game reference

Referees:
Fajar Hidayat (Indonesia)
Yongky Priyanto (Indonesia)

	0–1	Sun Woo Kim 11:55
Russel Vincent Alido 17:00 (PP)	1–1
	1–2	Young Jae Na 18:10
Christian Schoultze 27:56	2–2
	2–3	Yong Tae Kim 39:08
Ryan Hallden 43:02	3–3
Ysaac Mico Gelangre 53:24	4–3
Christian Schoultze 54:30	5–3
	5–4	Seung Hoon Baek 57:30
	5–5	Eu Sung Lee 59:53
Ryan Hallden 66:05 (PP)	6–5

2019 AOFC Cup

25 November 2019; 19:00 UTC+8	Philippines	5–4 (0–1, 2–1, 3–2)	Indonesia	UP College of Human Kinetics Gym, Quezon City; Attendance: 408

Game reference

Referees:
Jörgen Andersson (Sweden)
Daniel Dufvenberg (Sweden)

	0–1	Bayu Munandar 06:31
	0–2	Janter Kalvin Tampubolon 35:54
Christian Schoultze 38:37	1–2
Christian Schoultze 38:46	2–2
Christian Schoultze 46:31	3–2
Christian Schoultze 48:13	4–2
	4–3	Rudy Kurniawan 48:37 (PP)
	4–4	Rudy Kurniawan 53:59
Ryan Hallden 59:16	5–4

2019 Southeast Asian Games

26 November 2019; 19:00 UTC+8	Thailand	14–4 (6–1, 5–0, 3–3)	Philippines	UP College of Human Kinetics Gym, Quezon City; Attendance: 386

Game reference

Referees:
Sharil Ismail (Singapore)
Oswind Rosayro (Singapore)

Veerasak Pimpa 05:15	1–0
Jeerayut Yaemyim 05:30	2–0
Surapong Sangmongkhol 06:11	3–0
	3–1	Christofer Holland 06:58
Alexander Rinefalk 12:56	4–1
Santipong Sukkasem 15:42	5–1
Chusak Narkprasert 16:20	6–1
Jeerayut Yaemyim 28:04	7–1
Alexander Rinefalk 30:03	8–1
Jeerayut Yaemyim 30:22	9–1
Pawat Thaidit 30:56	10–1
Alexander Rinefalk 38:54	11–1
Pawat Thaidit 40:07	12–1
	12–2	Christian Schoultze 43:03
	12–3	Lucas Öijvall Perez 49:35
Watcharapon Onsuk 50:25	13–3
Nattawut Dueankhao 52:06	14–3
	14–4	Aristeo Perol II 54:16

2019 Southeast Asian Games

28 November 2019; 19:00 UTC+8	Philippines	2–5 (1–1, 1–3, 0–1)	'Singapore	UP College of Human Kinetics Gym, Quezon City; Attendance: 709

Game reference

Referees:
Lee Young June (Korea)
Shin Jong Suk (Korea)

Ryan Hallden 03:05	1–0
	1–1	Suria R 15:37
	1–2	Syazni Ramlee 20:35
	1–3	Jeremy Chia 22:59
Christian Schoultze 26:30 (SH)	2–3
	2–4	Jeremy Chia 33:36
	2–5	Juin Jie Ng 47:46

2019 Southeast Asian Games

29 November 2019; 19:00 UTC+8	Malaysia	7–8 (2–3, 4–1, 1–4)	Philippines	UP College of Human Kinetics Gym, Quezon City; Attendance: 618

Game reference

Referees:
Sharil Ismail (Singapore)
Oswind Rosayro (Singapore)

	0–1	Christian Schoultze 05:01
	0–2	Hazzer Talingdan 08:03
	0–3	Patrik Schoultze 11:23
Ter Min Chiam 11:39	1–3
Eugene Lai 18:46	2–3
Ter Min Chiam 29:15	3–3
Adrian Koay Hun Yi 31:22	4–3
	4–4	Lucas Öijvall Perez 32:02
Muhammad Faris Maznan 35:35	5–4
Indy Benjamin Toh Ji Min 36:54	6–4
Iman Nazirul Fitri Wagiman 44:10 (DP)	7–4
	7–5	Christian Schoultze 46:15 (DP)
	7–6	Henrik Dahmen 53:30 (PP)
	7–7	Christian Schoultze 46:15 (PP) 58:35
	7–8	Lucas Öijvall Perez 59:59

2019 Southeast Asian Games

1 December 2019; 15:00 UTC+8	Philippines	4–7 (2–1, 1–3, 1–3)	Malaysia	UP College of Human Kinetics Gym, Quezon City; Attendance: 860

Game reference

Referees:
Sharil Ismail (Singapore)
Oswind Rosayro (Singapore)

Christian Schoultze 06:04	1–0
	1–1	Indy Benjamin Toh Ji Min 15:51
Aristeo Perol II 18:55	2–1
	2–2	Eugene Lai 23:47
	2–3	Tristan Desmond Dass 25:09
	2–4	Eugene Lai 29:16
Fredrik Dahmen 35:47	3–4
	3–5	Zachary Choo Zhi Yung 42:35
	3–6	Fabian Chow Hoong Fee 45:07
	3–7	Muhammad Faris Maznan 49:20
Christian Schoultze 55:08	4–7

2019 Southeast Asian Games

== 2017 ==
2 July 2017; 16:00 UTC+7	Philippines	4–3 (1–0, 1–1, 2–2)	China	Chanatrayingyong Gymnasium, Bangkok; Attendance: 70

Game reference

Referees:
Sharil Ismail (Singapore)
Oswind Rosayro (Singapore)

Ysaac Mico Gelangre 12:43	1–0
	1–1	Jian Xiong Ruan 26:14
Jan Vitaliano 32:12	2–1
Renzo Fabon 42:12	3–1
	3–2	Yang Liu 54:35
	3–3	Heng Zhang 59:35
Ysaac Mico Gelangre 59:47	4–3

2017 AOFC Cup

July 2; 15:59	Iran	3–5 (1–2, 1–2, 1–1)	Philippines	Chanatrayingyong Gymnasium, Bangkok; Attendance: 80

Game reference

Referees:
Shin Jong Suk (South Korea)
Lee Young June (South Korea)

Arian Naderi 10:13	1–0
	1–1	Jason Florentino 12:40 (PP)
	1–2	Massada Cabillas 18:53 (PP)
Samad Allahverdi 22:08	2–2
	2–3	Jan Vitaliano 39:40
	2–4	Jason Florentino 39:53
	2–5	James Kevin De Jesus 43:21 (PP)
Arian Naderi 48:34	3–5

2017 AOFC Cup

3 July 2017; 13:00 UTC+7	Singapore	14–1 (6–0, 2–0, 6–1)	Philippines	Chanatrayingyong Gymnasium, Bangkok; Attendance: 60

Game reference

Referees:
Jaey Jetpuria (Malaysia)
Kenny Khoo (Malaysia)

Hamka Shah 04:21 (PP)	1–0
Hafiz Zubir 06:02	2–0
Kumaresa Pasupathy 07:35 (PP)	3–0
Kenan Monteiro 11:41	4–0
Rashid Jalaluddin 16:24	5–0
Rashid Jalaluddin 19:23	6–0
Hamka Shah 20:18	7–0
Nicholas Wee Guan Chua 38:47	8–0
Vignesa Pasupathy 43:15	9–0
Gary Wong 47:00	10–0
Tristan See 48:24	11–0
Rashid Jalaluddin 48:57	12–0
Rashid Jalaluddin 51:59	13–0
	13–1	Mark Polo 52:46
Nicholas Wee Guan Chua 56:39	14–1

2017 AOFC Cup

4 July 2017; 14:30 UTC+7	Philippines	4–7 (2–3, 1–3, 1–1)	Indonesia	Chanatrayingyong Gymnasium, Bangkok; Attendance: 60

Game reference

Referees:
Sharil Ismail (Singapore)
Oswind Rosayro (Singapore)

	0–1	Vigya Satria Pramanthana 04:33
	0–2	Ahmad Rokhim 11:27
	0–3	Rizki Ridlo Khaerudin 13:04
Luis Manila 13:28 (PP)	1–3
Massada Cabillas 16:39 (PP)	2–3
	2–4	Gharib Khotibul Umam 23:29
	2–5	Vigya Satria Pramanthana 24:14
Ralph Andrew Ramos 29:16	3–5
	3–6	Rudy Kurniawan 37:17
Jason Florentino 52:12	4–6
	4–7	Fahmi Azhari 57:38

2017 AOFC Cup

5 July 2017; 10:00 UTC+7	China	3–2 OT (1–0, 0–0, 1–2); 1–0 OT	Philippines	Chanatrayingyong Gymnasium, Bangkok; Attendance: 50

Game reference

Referees:
Lee Young-june (South Korea)
Shin Jong-suk (South Korea)

Songtao Tan 05:18	1–0
	1–1	Mark Polo 47:05
	1–2	Henielee Pastor 49:41
Xionghuan Zhang 58:20 (PP)	2–2
Jian Xiong Ruan 64:11	3–2

2017 AOFC Cup

6 July 2017; 09:30 UTC+7	Philippines	4–7 (0–1, 1–3, 3–3)	Iran	Chanatrayingyong Gymnasium, Bangkok; Attendance: 80

Game reference

Referees:
Sharil Ismail (Singapore)
Oswind Rosayro (Singapore)

	0–1	Mahdi Aghaji 01:33
	0–2	Arian Naderi 21:11
	0–3	Samad Allahverdi 23:12
Mark Polo 24:46	1–3
	1–4	Hamed Arab 28:10
	1–5	Mahdi Aghaji 40:32
	1–6	Mahdi Aghaji 41:18
Henielee Pastor 46:11 (PP)	2–6
Joseph Navarro 46:39	3–6
	3–7	Arian Naderi 47:32
Luis Manila 53:46 (PP)	4–7

2017 AOFC Cup

== 2015 ==
11 June 2015; 19:00 UTC+8	Philippines	2–17 (1–4, 1–6, 0–7)	Singapore	ITE (Central), Singapore; Attendance: 1452

Game reference

Referees:
Hakan Soderman (Sweden)
Glenn Boström (Sweden)

	0–1	Syazni Ramlee 03:20
	0–2	Amshar Amin 11:25
	0–3	Jenmark Sorreda 18:32
Mark Polo 19:17	1–3
	1–4	Syazni Ramlee 19:32
Mark Polo 24:10	2–4
	2–5	Hafiz Zubir 27:44
	2–6	Vignesa Pasupathy 27:58
	2–7	Syazni Ramlee 28:50
	2–8	Gary Wong 38:01
	2–9	Amshar Amin 38:27
	2–10	Jenmark Sorreda 39:16
	2–11	Vignesa Pasupathy 40:40
	2–12	Amshar Amin 42:01
	2–13	Brandon Cheong 49:42
	2–14	Rashid Jalaluddin 52:28
	2–15	Rashid Jalaluddin 56:31
	2–16	Syazni Ramlee 57:51
	2–17	Jian Hong Lim 59:14

2015 Southeast Asian Games

12 June 2015; 13:00 UTC+8	Malaysia	10–0 (3–0, 5–0, 2–0)	Philippines	ITE (Central), Singapore; Attendance: 658

Game reference

Referees:
Dennis Lim (Singapore)
Sharil Ismail (Singapore)

Kien Teck Low 15:51	1–0
Kai Sheng Lim 18:46	2–0
Chong Chao Seng 25:19	3–0
Indy Benjamin Benjamin Toh 29:18 (PP)	4–0
Indy Benjamin Benjamin Toh 32:49 (PP)	5–0
Joerel Jarrow Jnr 34:10 (PS)	6–0
Chong Chao Seng 35:19	7–0
Sasitheran Gopalan 44:36 (SH)	8–0
Sasitheran Gopalan 48:49	9–0
Kai Sheng Lim 53:14	10–0

2015 Southeast Asian Games

13 June 2015; 13:00 UTC+8	Thailand	11–2 (2–0, 5–1, 4–1)	Philippines	ITE (Central), Singapore; Attendance: 845

Game reference

Referees:
Keita Suzuki (Japan)
Eisabura Okano (Japan)

Alexander Rinefalk 00:08	1–0
Alexander Rinefalk 02:03	2–0
Gorawee Srikaew 21:26	3–0
Veerasak Pimpa 28:26	4–0
Wiros Yosiri 33:00	5–0
Watcharapon Onsuk 35:59 (SH)	6–0
	6–1	Ronald Rozz Carbonell 39:14
Pornphon Phuttharakkhit 39:43	7–1
Sattaya Phoosinoi 40:19	8–1
Veerasak Pimpa 45:08	9–1
Veerasak Pimpa 47:56	10–1
Sattaya Phoosinoi 51:56	11–1
	11–2	Mark Polo 59:00

2015 Southeast Asian Games

14 June 2015; 12:00 UTC+8	Malaysia	11–3 (2–1, 5–1, 4–1)	Philippines	ITE (Central), Singapore; Attendance: 1200

Game reference

Referees:
Dennis Lim (Singapore)
Sharil Ismail (Singapore)

Sjaiful Anuar Adzahar 11:37	1–0
	1–1	Mark Polo 15:07
Adrian Koay 18:52	2–1
Joerel Jarrow Jnr 23:21	3–1
Kien Teck Low 25:58	4–1
Tristan Desmond Dass 28:10	5–1
Ter Min Chiam 33:03	6–1
Tristan Desmond Dass 33:33	7–1
	7–2	Mark Polo 37:06
Zephaniah Chong 40:34 (PP)	8–2
	8–3	Mark Jello Cerdon 45:54
Mohammad Khalid Abdul Rahim 57:07	9–3
Tristan Desmond Dass 59:14	10–3
Rizal Razman 59:54	11–3

2015 Southeast Asian Games

== 2014 ==
18 December 2014; 16:30 UTC+8	Singapore	11–0 (5–0, 4–0, 2–0)	Philippines	Hougang Sports Complex, Hougang; Attendance: 114

Game reference

Referees:
Rameli (Indonesia)
Kristiyanto Widhie (Indonesia)

Vignesa Pasupathy 04:13	1–0
En Rui Soh 06:07	2–0
Siraaj Ramadhan 13:04	3–0
Yu Chong Thio 17:10	4–0
En Rui Soh 18:18	5–0
Yu Chong Thio 20:28	6–0
Yusuf Muhammad 23:22	7–0
Jared Goh 27:35	8–0
Siraaj Ramadhan 28:41	9–0
Siraaj Ramadhan 57:01	10–0
Jared Goh 58:46	11–0

1st Southeast Asian Championships

19 December 2014; 11:30 UTC+8	Philippines	2–7 (0–4, 0–1, 2–2)	Indonesia	Hougang Sports Complex, Hougang; Attendance: 75

Game reference

Referees:
Dennis Lim (Singapore)
Sharil Ismail (Singapore)

	0–1	Yuliansyah Kurnianto 07:11 (PP)
	0–2	Sabil Almasyari 07:23 (PP)
	0–3	Adie Dwie 13:43 (PP)
	0–4	Epul Saepul 17:07 (PP)
	0–5	Vigya Satria Pramanthana 36:58
Mark Polo 47:51	1–5
	1–6	Khaidir Umar 48:22
Mark Polo 50:52	2–6
	2–7	Kevin Prakoso 55:15

1st Southeast Asian Championships

20 December 2014; 14:00 UTC+8	Malaysia	8–1 (2–1, 3–0, 3–0)	Philippines	Hougang Sports Complex, Hougang; Attendance: 98

Game reference

Referees:
Bin Bin Lin (Singapore)
Carmen Teo (Singapore)

Ter Min Chiam 04:52	1–0
	1–1	Nimuel Diones 16:49
Ravi Kumar Kumar 16:53	2–1
Ter Min Chiam 29:13 (PP)	3–1
Kai Sheng Lim 35:55	4–1
Ter Min Chiam 37:06 (PP)	5–1
Ter Min Chiam 49:59	6–1
Sjaipul Anuar 52:11	7–1
Joerel Jarron 57:35 (PP)	8–1

1st Southeast Asian Championships

21 December 2014; 12:30 UTC+8	Indonesia	6–1 (2–1, 1–0, 3–0)	Philippines	Hougang Sports Complex, Hougang; Attendance: 55

Game reference

Referees:
Jaey Jetpuria (Malaysia)
Kenny Khoo (Malaysia)

	0–1	Mark Polo 05:04
Khaidir Umar 09:10	1–1
Handanu Wisnu Wundunata 19:38 (PP)	2–1
Fahmi Azhari 25:22	3–1
Epul Saepul 41:13	4–1
Khaidir Umar 42:51	5–1
Fahmi Azhari 48:00 (PP)	6–1

1st Southeast Asian Championships
