= 2018 Men's World Floorball Championships qualifying =

Floorball competition

Host Qualified Did not qualify

The qualifying for the 2018 Men's World Floorball Championships took place between 22 January and 11 February 2018. A total of 33 teams competed for sixteen spots. The final tournament was organized by Czech Republic in December 2018.

== Overview ==
Numbers in brackets show the ranking before the qualification started, which is based on results from the last two World Championships.

Europe 1	Europe 2	Europe 3	Europe 4	Asia/Oceania 1	Asia/Oceania 2	Americas
**Finland (1)**; **Estonia (9)**; **Poland (14)**; Belgium (25); Netherlands (27); Liechtenstein (33)	**Sweden (2)**; **Germany (8)**; **Slovakia (10)**; Slovenia (24); France (28)	**Switzerland (3)**; **Latvia (7)**; Russia (15); Italy (21); Hungary (30); Iceland (32)	**Denmark (5)**; **Norway (6)**; Spain (19); Austria (20); Great Britain (31)	**Australia (13)**; South Korea (18); **Thailand (22)**; China (–); ~~Iran~~ (–)	**Japan (16)**; **Singapore (17)**; New Zealand (26); Malaysia (29)	United States (11); **Canada (12)**

Notes

- Teams marked in **bold** have qualified for the final tournament.

== Europe ==
The qualification rules are as follows:

- The two best teams from each qualification group will qualify
- The two best third placed teams will qualify
  - The calculation of the best 3rd teams will follow this order:
    - 1. Average number of points
    - 2. Average goal difference
    - 3. Average scored goals
    - 4. Drawing of lots

=== Europe 1 ===
Pos	Team	Pld	W	D	L	GF	GA	GD	Pts	Qualification
1	Finland	5	5	0	0	111	3	+108	10	World Floorball Championships
2	Estonia (H)	5	4	0	1	44	28	+16	8	World Floorball Championships
3	Poland	5	3	0	2	30	23	+7	6	WFC final if among four best third-placed teams
4	Belgium	5	1	1	3	19	55	−36	3	
5	Netherlands	5	1	1	3	25	62	−37	3	
6	Liechtenstein	5	0	0	5	11	69	−58	0	

Source: IFF
Rules for classification: Qualification tiebreakers
(H) Hosts

31 January 2018; 13:00	**Finland**	**13–1**	Poland	Kalev Sports Hall, Tallinn, Estonia; Attendance: 109; Referees: Kumerdanks, Kristapsons (LAT)
31 January 2018; 13:00	Report			Kalev Sports Hall, Tallinn, Estonia; Attendance: 109; Referees: Kumerdanks, Kristapsons (LAT)

31 January 2018; 16:00	Belgium	**5–5**	Netherlands	Kalev Sports Hall, Tallinn, Estonia; Attendance: 149; Referees: Johanson, Monge (NOR)
31 January 2018; 16:00	Report			Kalev Sports Hall, Tallinn, Estonia; Attendance: 149; Referees: Johanson, Monge (NOR)

31 January 2018; 19:00	**Estonia**	**13–2**	Liechtenstein	Kalev Sports Hall, Tallinn, Estonia; Attendance: 333; Referees: Hohler, Koch (SUI)
31 January 2018; 19:00	Report			Kalev Sports Hall, Tallinn, Estonia; Attendance: 333; Referees: Hohler, Koch (SUI)

1 February 2018; 13:00	**Poland**	**9–2**	Belgium	Kalev Sports Hall, Tallinn, Estonia; Attendance: 102; Referees: Hohler, Koch (SUI)
1 February 2018; 13:00	Report			Kalev Sports Hall, Tallinn, Estonia; Attendance: 102; Referees: Hohler, Koch (SUI)

1 February 2018; 16:00	Liechtenstein	**0–24**	**Finland**	Kalev Sports Hall, Tallinn, Estonia; Attendance: 138; Referees: Johansen, Monge (NOR)
1 February 2018; 16:00	Report			Kalev Sports Hall, Tallinn, Estonia; Attendance: 138; Referees: Johansen, Monge (NOR)

1 February 2018; 19:00	Netherlands	**3–9**	**Estonia**	Kalev Sports Hall, Tallinn, Estonia; Attendance: Kumerdanks, Kristapons (LAT); Referees: 386
1 February 2018; 19:00	Report			Kalev Sports Hall, Tallinn, Estonia; Attendance: Kumerdanks, Kristapons (LAT); Referees: 386

2 February 2018; 13:00	Liechtenstein	**1–10**	**Poland**	Kalev Sports Hall, Tallinn, Estonia; Attendance: 132; Referees: Kumerdanks, Kristapons (LAT)
2 February 2018; 13:00	Report			Kalev Sports Hall, Tallinn, Estonia; Attendance: 132; Referees: Kumerdanks, Kristapons (LAT)

2 February 2018; 16:00	**Finland**	**32–1**	Netherlands	Kalev Sports Hall, Tallinn, Estonia; Attendance: 269; Referees: Hohler, Koch (SUI)
2 February 2018; 16:00	Report			Kalev Sports Hall, Tallinn, Estonia; Attendance: 269; Referees: Hohler, Koch (SUI)

2 February 2018; 19:00	**Estonia**	**16–4**	Belgium	Kalev Sports Hall, Tallinn, Estonia; Attendance: 573; Referees: Johansen, Monge (NOR)
2 February 2018; 19:00	Report			Kalev Sports Hall, Tallinn, Estonia; Attendance: 573; Referees: Johansen, Monge (NOR)

3 February 2018; 11:00	**Netherlands**	**8–3**	Liechtenstein	Kalev Sports Hall, Tallinn, Estonia; Attendance: 140; Referees: Hohler, Koch (SUI)
3 February 2018; 11:00	Report			Kalev Sports Hall, Tallinn, Estonia; Attendance: 140; Referees: Hohler, Koch (SUI)

3 February 2018; 14:00	Belgium	**0–27**	**Finland**	Kalev Sports Hall, Tallinn, Estonia; Attendance: 237; Referees: Kumerdanks, Kristapons (LAT)
3 February 2018; 14:00	Report			Kalev Sports Hall, Tallinn, Estonia; Attendance: 237; Referees: Kumerdanks, Kristapons (LAT)

3 February 2018; 17:00	Poland	**4–5**	**Estonia**	Kalev Sports Hall, Tallinn, Estonia; Attendance: 1013; Referees: Johansen, Monge (NOR)
3 February 2018; 17:00	Report			Kalev Sports Hall, Tallinn, Estonia; Attendance: 1013; Referees: Johansen, Monge (NOR)

4 February 2018; 09:00	Liechtenstein	**5–14**	**Belgium**	Kalev Sports Hall, Tallinn, Estonia; Attendance: 96; Referees: Johansen, Monge (NOR)
4 February 2018; 09:00	Report			Kalev Sports Hall, Tallinn, Estonia; Attendance: 96; Referees: Johansen, Monge (NOR)

4 February 2018; 12:00	Netherlands	**2–6**	**Poland**	Kalev Sports Hall, Tallinn, Estonia; Attendance: 148; Referees: Hohler, Koch (SUI)
4 February 2018; 12:00	Report			Kalev Sports Hall, Tallinn, Estonia; Attendance: 148; Referees: Hohler, Koch (SUI)

4 February 2018; 15:00	Estonia	**1–15**	**Finland**	Kalev Sports Hall, Tallinn, Estonia; Attendance: 863; Referees: Kumerdanks, Kristapons (LAT)
4 February 2018; 15:00	Report			Kalev Sports Hall, Tallinn, Estonia; Attendance: 863; Referees: Kumerdanks, Kristapons (LAT)

=== Europe 2 ===
Pos	Team	Pld	W	D	L	GF	GA	GD	Pts	Qualification
1	Sweden	4	4	0	0	94	6	+88	**8**	World Floorball Championships
2	Slovakia (H)	4	3	0	1	24	18	+6	**6**	World Floorball Championships
3	Germany	4	2	0	2	25	28	−3	**4**	WFC final if among four best third-placed teams
4	Slovenia	4	1	0	3	23	41	−18	**2**	
5	France	4	0	0	4	12	85	−73	**0**	

Source: IFF
Rules for classification: Qualification tiebreakers
(H) Hosts

31 January 2018; 16:00	Slovenia	**2–7**	**Slovakia**	Nitra Aréna, Nitra, Slovakia; Attendance: 325; Referees: Sjörgen, Ellis (FIN)
31 January 2018; 16:00	Report			Nitra Aréna, Nitra, Slovakia; Attendance: 325; Referees: Sjörgen, Ellis (FIN)

31 January 2018; 19:00	France	**1–43**	**Sweden**	Nitra Aréna, Nitra, Slovakia; Attendance: 158; Referees: Ilyk, Zolotar (UKR)
31 January 2018; 19:00	Report			Nitra Aréna, Nitra, Slovakia; Attendance: 158; Referees: Ilyk, Zolotar (UKR)

1 February 2018; 16:00	**Germany**	**6–5**	Slovenia	Nitra Aréna, Nitra, Slovakia; Attendance: 152; Referees: Cibik, Michal (SVK)
1 February 2018; 16:00	Report			Nitra Aréna, Nitra, Slovakia; Attendance: 152; Referees: Cibik, Michal (SVK)

1 February 2018; 19:00	**Slovakia**	**10–3**	France	Nitra Aréna, Nitra, Slovakia; Attendance: 436; Referees: Ilyk, Zolotar (UKR)
1 February 2018; 19:00	Report			Nitra Aréna, Nitra, Slovakia; Attendance: 436; Referees: Ilyk, Zolotar (UKR)

2 February 2018; 16:00	**Slovenia**	**15–5**	France	Nitra Aréna, Nitra, Slovakia; Attendance: 217; Referees: Heinola, Marttinen (FIN)
2 February 2018; 16:00	Report			Nitra Aréna, Nitra, Slovakia; Attendance: 217; Referees: Heinola, Marttinen (FIN)

2 February 2018; 19:00	**Sweden**	**17–0**	Germany	Nitra Aréna, Nitra, Slovakia; Attendance: 512; Referees: Sjögren, Ellis (FIN)
2 February 2018; 19:00	Report			Nitra Aréna, Nitra, Slovakia; Attendance: 512; Referees: Sjögren, Ellis (FIN)

3 February 2018; 13:00	**Sweden**	**23–1**	Slovenia	Nitra Aréna, Nitra, Slovakia; Attendance: 589; Referees: Cibik, Michal (SVK)
3 February 2018; 13:00	Report			Nitra Aréna, Nitra, Slovakia; Attendance: 589; Referees: Cibik, Michal (SVK)

3 February 2018; 19:00	Germany	**2–3**	**Slovakia**	Nitra Aréna, Nitra, Slovakia; Attendance: 2149; Referees: Heinola, Marttinen (FIN)
3 February 2018; 19:00	Report			Nitra Aréna, Nitra, Slovakia; Attendance: 2149; Referees: Heinola, Marttinen (FIN)

4 February 2018; 15:00	France	**3–17**	**Germany**	Nitra Aréna, Nitra, Slovakia; Attendance: 277; Referees: Cibik, Michal (SVK)
4 February 2018; 15:00	Report			Nitra Aréna, Nitra, Slovakia; Attendance: 277; Referees: Cibik, Michal (SVK)

4 February 2018; 19:00	Slovakia	**4–11**	**Sweden**	Nitra Aréna, Nitra, Slovakia; Attendance: 1862; Referees: Sjögren, Ellis (FIN)
4 February 2018; 19:00	Report			Nitra Aréna, Nitra, Slovakia; Attendance: 1862; Referees: Sjögren, Ellis (FIN)

=== Europe 3 ===
Pos	Team	Pld	W	D	L	GF	GA	GD	Pts	Qualification
1	Switzerland	5	5	0	0	87	12	+75	10	World Floorball Championships
2	Latvia (H)	5	4	0	1	48	14	+34	8	World Floorball Championships
3	Russia	5	2	1	2	30	42	−12	5	WFC final if among four best third-placed teams
4	Hungary	5	2	1	2	25	47	−22	5	
5	Iceland	5	1	0	4	14	57	−43	2	
6	Italy	5	0	0	5	13	45	−32	0	

Source: IFF
Rules for classification: Qualification tiebreakers
(H) Hosts

30 January 2018; 13:00	Iceland	**5–7**	**Russia**	Vidzemes OC, Valmiera, Latvia; Attendance: 228; Referees: Lewis, Silvo (FIN)
30 January 2018; 13:00	Report			Vidzemes OC, Valmiera, Latvia; Attendance: 228; Referees: Lewis, Silvo (FIN)

30 January 2018; 16:00	Italy	**2–18**	**Switzerland**	Vidzemes OC, Valmiera, Latvia; Attendance: 213; Referees: Lindgren, Trogstad (NOR)
30 January 2018; 16:00	Report			Vidzemes OC, Valmiera, Latvia; Attendance: 213; Referees: Lindgren, Trogstad (NOR)

30 January 2018; 19:00	Hungary	**1–12**	**Latvia**	Vidzemes OC, Valmiera, Latvia; Attendance: 672; Referees: Nabelek, Stengl (CZE)
30 January 2018; 19:00	Report			Vidzemes OC, Valmiera, Latvia; Attendance: 672; Referees: Nabelek, Stengl (CZE)

31 January 2018; 13:00	**Switzerland**	**22–3**	Iceland	Vidzemes OC, Valmiera, Latvia; Attendance: 187; Referees: Nabelek, Stengl (CZE)
31 January 2018; 13:00	Report			Vidzemes OC, Valmiera, Latvia; Attendance: 187; Referees: Nabelek, Stengl (CZE)

31 January 2018; 16:00	Russia	**8–8**	Hungary	Vidzemes OC, Valmiera, Latvia; Attendance: 241; Referees: Lindgren, Trogstad (NOR)
31 January 2018; 16:00	Report			Vidzemes OC, Valmiera, Latvia; Attendance: 241; Referees: Lindgren, Trogstad (NOR)

31 January 2018; 19:00	**Latvia**	**11–1**	Italy	Vidzemes OC, Valmiera, Latvia; Attendance: 461; Referees: Lewis, Silvo (FIN)
31 January 2018; 19:00	Report			Vidzemes OC, Valmiera, Latvia; Attendance: 461; Referees: Lewis, Silvo (FIN)

1 February 2018; 13:00	Hungary	**0–21**	**Switzerland**	Vidzemes OC, Valmiera, Latvia; Attendance: 113; Referees: Lewis, Silvo (FIN)
1 February 2018; 13:00	Report			Vidzemes OC, Valmiera, Latvia; Attendance: 113; Referees: Lewis, Silvo (FIN)

1 February 2018; 16:00	**Iceland**	**3–2**	Italy	Vidzemes OC, Valmiera, Latvia; Attendance: 183; Referees: Nabelek, Stengl (CZE)
1 February 2018; 16:00	Report			Vidzemes OC, Valmiera, Latvia; Attendance: 183; Referees: Nabelek, Stengl (CZE)

1 February 2018; 19:00	Russia	**3–7**	**Latvia**	Vidzemes OC, Valmiera, Latvia; Attendance: 949; Referees: Lindgren, Trogstad (NOR)
1 February 2018; 19:00	Report			Vidzemes OC, Valmiera, Latvia; Attendance: 949; Referees: Lindgren, Trogstad (NOR)

2 February 2018; 13:00	Italy	**3–4**	**Hungary**	Vidzemes OC, Valmiera, Latvia; Attendance: 128; Referees: Lindgren, Trogstad (NOR)
2 February 2018; 13:00	Report			Vidzemes OC, Valmiera, Latvia; Attendance: 128; Referees: Lindgren, Trogstad (NOR)

2 February 2018; 16:00	**Switzerland**	**17–3**	Russia	Vidzemes OC, Valmiera, Latvia; Attendance: 244; Referees: Nebelek, Stengl (CZE)
2 February 2018; 16:00	Report			Vidzemes OC, Valmiera, Latvia; Attendance: 244; Referees: Nebelek, Stengl (CZE)

2 February 2018; 19:00	**Latvia**	**14–0**	Iceland	Vidzemes OC, Valmiera, Latvia; Attendance: 758; Referees: Lewis, Silvo (FIN)
2 February 2018; 19:00	Report			Vidzemes OC, Valmiera, Latvia; Attendance: 758; Referees: Lewis, Silvo (FIN)

3 February 2018; 12:00	**Russia**	**9–5**	Italy	Vidzemes OC, Valmiera, Latvia; Attendance: 113; Referees: Lindgren, Trogstad (NOR)
3 February 2018; 12:00	Report			Vidzemes OC, Valmiera, Latvia; Attendance: 113; Referees: Lindgren, Trogstad (NOR)

3 February 2018; 15:00	Iceland	**3–12**	**Hungary**	Vidzemes OC, Valmiera, Latvia; Attendance: 337; Referees: Nabelek, Stengl (CZE)
3 February 2018; 15:00	Report			Vidzemes OC, Valmiera, Latvia; Attendance: 337; Referees: Nabelek, Stengl (CZE)

3 February 2018; 18:00	**Switzerland**	**9–4**	Latvia	Vidzemes OC, Valmiera, Latvia; Attendance: 1785; Referees: Lewis, Silvo (FIN)
3 February 2018; 18:00	Report			Vidzemes OC, Valmiera, Latvia; Attendance: 1785; Referees: Lewis, Silvo (FIN)

=== Europe 4 ===
Pos	Team	Pld	W	D	L	GF	GA	GD	Pts	Qualification
1	Norway	4	4	0	0	45	9	+36	**8**	World Floorball Championships
2	Denmark	4	3	0	1	34	13	+21	**6**	World Floorball Championships
3	Spain	4	2	0	2	20	23	−3	**4**	WFC final if among four best third-placed teams
4	Great Britain	4	1	0	3	9	52	−43	**2**	
5	Austria	4	0	0	4	12	23	−11	**0**	

Source: IFF
Rules for classification: Qualification tiebreakers

31 January 2018; 10:00	**Denmark**	**6–3**	Austria	Nitra Aréna, Nitra, Slovakia; Attendance: 136; Referees: Cibik, Michal (SVK)
31 January 2018; 10:00	Report			Nitra Aréna, Nitra, Slovakia; Attendance: 136; Referees: Cibik, Michal (SVK)

31 January 2018; 13:00	**Spain**	**11–1**	Great Britain	Nitra Aréna, Nitra, Slovakia; Attendance: 133; Referees: Heinola, Marttinen (FIN)
31 January 2018; 13:00	Report			Nitra Aréna, Nitra, Slovakia; Attendance: 133; Referees: Heinola, Marttinen (FIN)

1 February 2018; 10:00	**Norway**	**13–0**	Spain	Nitra Aréna, Nitra, Slovakia; Attendance: 348; Referees: Heinola, Marttinen (FIN)
1 February 2018; 10:00	Report			Nitra Aréna, Nitra, Slovakia; Attendance: 348; Referees: Heinola, Marttinen (FIN)

1 February 2018; 13:00	Great Britain	**0–16**	**Denmark**	Nitra Aréna, Nitra, Slovakia; Attendance: 156; Referees: Sjögren, Ellis (FIN)
1 February 2018; 13:00	Report			Nitra Aréna, Nitra, Slovakia; Attendance: 156; Referees: Sjögren, Ellis (FIN)

2 February 2018; 10:00	Spain	**3–6**	**Denmark**	Nitra Aréna, Nitra, Slovakia; Attendance: 118; Referees: Cibik, Michal (SVK)
2 February 2018; 10:00	Report			Nitra Aréna, Nitra, Slovakia; Attendance: 118; Referees: Cibik, Michal (SVK)

2 February 2018; 13:00	Austria	**2–4**	**Norway**	Nitra Aréna, Nitra, Slovakia; Attendance: 144; Referees: Ilyk, Zolotar (UKR)
2 February 2018; 13:00	Report			Nitra Aréna, Nitra, Slovakia; Attendance: 144; Referees: Ilyk, Zolotar (UKR)

3 February 2018; 10:00	Austria	**3–6**	**Spain**	Nitra Aréna, Nitra, Slovakia; Attendance: 147; Referees: Sjögren, Ellis (FIN)
3 February 2018; 10:00	Report			Nitra Aréna, Nitra, Slovakia; Attendance: 147; Referees: Sjögren, Ellis (FIN)

3 February 2018; 16:00	**Norway**	**21–1**	Great Britain	Nitra Aréna, Nitra, Slovakia; Attendance: 583; Referees: Ilyk, Zolotar (UKR)
3 February 2018; 16:00	Report			Nitra Aréna, Nitra, Slovakia; Attendance: 583; Referees: Ilyk, Zolotar (UKR)

4 February 2018; 09:00	**Great Britain**	**7–4**	Austria	Nitra Aréna, Nitra, Slovakia; Attendance: 121; Referees: Ilyk, Zolotar (UKR)
4 February 2018; 09:00	Report			Nitra Aréna, Nitra, Slovakia; Attendance: 121; Referees: Ilyk, Zolotar (UKR)

4 February 2018; 12:00	Denmark	**6–7**	**Norway**	Nitra Aréna, Nitra, Slovakia; Attendance: 228; Referees: Heinola, Marttinen (FIN)
4 February 2018; 12:00	Report			Nitra Aréna, Nitra, Slovakia; Attendance: 228; Referees: Heinola, Marttinen (FIN)

=== Best four runner-ups ===
Only the two best runner-ups of the four will advance. Since the number of teams between the qualification groups differs, the group sizes will be equalized by removing the results from the matches against the lowest placed teams in the larger-sized group before comparing the average results.

Pos	Team	Pld	W	D	L	GF	GA	GD	Pts	Qualification
1	Poland	4	2	0	2	20	22	−2	**4**	WFC Final
2	Germany	4	2	0	2	25	28	−3	**4**	WFC Final
3	Spain	4	2	0	2	20	23	−3	**4**	
4	Russia	4	1	1	2	21	37	−16	**3**	

Source: IFF
Rules for classification: Qualification tiebreakers

== Asia/Oceania ==
=== Asia/Oceania 1 ===
Pos	Team	Pld	W	D	L	GF	GA	GD	Pts	Qualification
1	Australia	3	3	0	0	39	6	+33	**6**	World Floorball Championships
2	Thailand	3	2	0	1	52	5	+47	**4**	Semifinals
3	South Korea (H)	3	1	0	2	16	21	−5	**2**	Semifinals
4	China	3	0	0	3	2	77	−75	**0**	

Source: IFF
Rules for classification: Qualification tiebreakers
(H) Hosts

22 January 2018; 15:45	China	**0–14**	**South Korea**	Jeju World Cup Stadium, Jeju Island, South Korea; Attendance: 140; Referees: Hidayat, Priyanto (INA)
22 January 2018; 15:45	Report			Jeju World Cup Stadium, Jeju Island, South Korea; Attendance: 140; Referees: Hidayat, Priyanto (INA)

23 January 2018; 13:00	**Thailand**	**37–1**	China	Jeju World Cup Stadium, Jeju Island, South Korea; Attendance: 130; Referees: Lee, Shin (KOR)
23 January 2018; 13:00	Report			Jeju World Cup Stadium, Jeju Island, South Korea; Attendance: 130; Referees: Lee, Shin (KOR)

23 January 2018; 18:30	South Korea	**2–9**	**Australia**	Jeju World Cup Stadium, Jeju Island, South Korea; Attendance: 87; Referees: Ismail, Rosayro (SIN)
23 January 2018; 18:30	Report			Jeju World Cup Stadium, Jeju Island, South Korea; Attendance: 87; Referees: Ismail, Rosayro (SIN)

24 January 2018; 14:15	**Australia**	**4–3**	Thailand	Jeju World Cup Stadium, Jeju Island, South Korea; Attendance: 240; Referees: Andersson, Wissman (SWE)
24 January 2018; 14:15	Report			Jeju World Cup Stadium, Jeju Island, South Korea; Attendance: 240; Referees: Andersson, Wissman (SWE)

25 January 2018; 15:45	China	**1–26**	**Australia**	Jeju World Cup Stadium, Jeju Island, South Korea; Attendance: 105; Referees: Hidayat, Priyanto (INA)
25 January 2018; 15:45	Report			Jeju World Cup Stadium, Jeju Island, South Korea; Attendance: 105; Referees: Hidayat, Priyanto (INA)

25 January 2018; 18:30	**Thailand**	**12–0**	South Korea	Jeju World Cup Stadium, Jeju Island, South Korea; Attendance: 125; Referees: Ismail, Rosayro (SIN)
25 January 2018; 18:30	Report			Jeju World Cup Stadium, Jeju Island, South Korea; Attendance: 125; Referees: Ismail, Rosayro (SIN)

=== Asia/Oceania 2 ===
Pos	Team	Pld	W	D	L	GF	GA	GD	Pts	Qualification
1	Singapore	3	2	1	0	25	7	+18	**5**	World Floorball Championships
2	Japan	3	2	1	0	19	8	+11	**5**	Semifinals
3	New Zealand	3	0	1	2	8	18	−10	**1**	Semifinals
4	Malaysia	3	0	1	2	9	28	−19	**1**	

Source: IFF
Rules for classification: Qualification tiebreakers

22 January 2018; 10:20	**Singapore**	**10–2**	New Zealand	Jeju World Cup Stadium, Jeju Island, South Korea; Attendance: 92; Referees: Andersson, Wissman (SWE)
22 January 2018; 10:20	Report			Jeju World Cup Stadium, Jeju Island, South Korea; Attendance: 92; Referees: Andersson, Wissman (SWE)

22 January 2018; 13:00	**Japan**	**12–3**	Malaysia	Jeju World Cup Stadium, Jeju Island, South Korea; Attendance: 160; Referees: Lee, Shin (KOR)
22 January 2018; 13:00	Report			Jeju World Cup Stadium, Jeju Island, South Korea; Attendance: 160; Referees: Lee, Shin (KOR)

23 January 2018; 15:45	Singapore	**4–4**	Japan	Jeju World Cup Stadium, Jeju Island, South Korea; Attendance: 171; Referees: Hidayat, Priyanto (INA)
23 January 2018; 15:45	Report			Jeju World Cup Stadium, Jeju Island, South Korea; Attendance: 171; Referees: Hidayat, Priyanto (INA)

24 January 2018; 16:00	New Zealand	**5–5**	Malaysia	Jeju World Cup Stadium, Jeju Island, South Korea; Attendance: 130; Referees: Ismail, Rosayro (SIN)
24 January 2018; 16:00	Report			Jeju World Cup Stadium, Jeju Island, South Korea; Attendance: 130; Referees: Ismail, Rosayro (SIN)

25 January 2018; 10:15	Malaysia	**1–11**	**Singapore**	Jeju World Cup Stadium, Jeju Island, South Korea; Attendance: 110; Referees: Andersson, Wissman (SWE)
25 January 2018; 10:15	Report			Jeju World Cup Stadium, Jeju Island, South Korea; Attendance: 110; Referees: Andersson, Wissman (SWE)

25 January 2018; 13:00	New Zealand	**1–3**	**Japan**	Jeju World Cup Stadium, Jeju Island, South Korea; Attendance: 136; Referees: Lee, Shin (KOR)
25 January 2018; 13:00	Report			Jeju World Cup Stadium, Jeju Island, South Korea; Attendance: 136; Referees: Lee, Shin (KOR)

=== Second round ===
==== 7th place game ====
26 January 2018; 12:10	**Malaysia**	**17–1**	China	Jeju World Cup Stadium, Jeju Island, South Korea; Attendance: 70; Referees: Lee, Shin (KOR)
26 January 2018; 12:10	Report			Jeju World Cup Stadium, Jeju Island, South Korea; Attendance: 70; Referees: Lee, Shin (KOR)

Semifinals
**Thailand**	**11**
New Zealand	2
**Japan**	**6**
South Korea	2

3rd place game
Thailand	1
**Japan**	**8**
5th place game
New Zealand	2
**South Korea**	**9**

==== Semifinals ====
26 January 2018; 15:10	**Thailand**	**11–2**	New Zealand	Jeju World Cup Stadium, Jeju Island, South Korea; Attendance: 130; Referees: Ismail, Rosayro (SIN)
26 January 2018; 15:10	Report			Jeju World Cup Stadium, Jeju Island, South Korea; Attendance: 130; Referees: Ismail, Rosayro (SIN)

26 January 2018; 18:00	**Japan**	**6–2**	South Korea	Jeju World Cup Stadium, Jeju Island, South Korea; Attendance: 100; Referees: Andersson, Wissman (SWE)
26 January 2018; 18:00	Report			Jeju World Cup Stadium, Jeju Island, South Korea; Attendance: 100; Referees: Andersson, Wissman (SWE)

==== 5th place game ====
27 January 2018; 10:00	New Zealand	**2–9**	**South Korea**	Jeju World Cup Stadium, Jeju Island, South Korea; Attendance: 95; Referees: Hidayat, Priyanto (INA)
27 January 2018; 10:00	Report			Jeju World Cup Stadium, Jeju Island, South Korea; Attendance: 95; Referees: Hidayat, Priyanto (INA)

==== 3rd place game ====
27 January 2018; 13:00	Thailand	**1–8**	**Japan**	Jeju World Cup Stadium, Jeju Island, South Korea; Attendance: 140; Referees: Ismail, Rosayro (SIN)
27 January 2018; 13:00	Report			Jeju World Cup Stadium, Jeju Island, South Korea; Attendance: 140; Referees: Ismail, Rosayro (SIN)

==== Final ====
27 January 2018; 16:00	**Australia**	**5–4**	Singapore	Jeju World Cup Stadium, Jeju Island, South Korea; Attendance: 205; Referees: Andersson, Wissman (SWE)
27 January 2018; 16:00	Report			Jeju World Cup Stadium, Jeju Island, South Korea; Attendance: 205; Referees: Andersson, Wissman (SWE)

=== Final ranking ===
Qualified for the 2018 Men's World Floorball Championships

Rank	Team
1	Australia
2	Singapore
3	Japan
4	Thailand
5	South Korea
6	New Zealand
7	Malaysia
8	China

== Americas ==
Pos	Team	Pld	W	D	L	GF	GA	GD	Pts	Qualification
1	Canada (H)	2	2	0	0	8	6	+2	**4**	World Floorball Championships
2	United States	2	0	0	2	6	8	−2	**0**	

Source: IFF
Rules for classification: Qualification tiebreakers
(H) Hosts

10 February 2018; 10:00	**Canada**	**3–2**	United States	Maple Leaf Gardens, Toronto, Canada; Attendance: 136; Referees: Soderman, Boström (SWE)
10 February 2018; 10:00	Report			Maple Leaf Gardens, Toronto, Canada; Attendance: 136; Referees: Soderman, Boström (SWE)

11 February 2018; 10:00	United States	**4–5**	**Canada**	Maple Leaf Gardens, Toronto, Canada; Attendance: 125; Referees: Soderman, Boström (SWE)
11 February 2018; 10:00	Report			Maple Leaf Gardens, Toronto, Canada; Attendance: 125; Referees: Soderman, Boström (SWE)
