= HK Nitra ženy =

Slovakia-based ice hockey team

- City: Nitra, Slovakia
- League: Slovak Women's Ice Hockey League
- Founded: 26 March 2026; 7 months ago
- Home arena: Hokejová hala Klokočina (capacity 288)
- Colours: Prussian blue, Columbia blue, white
- General manager: Karol Jurík
- Head coach: Tomáš Segíň
- Captain: Laura Jancsóová
- Website: www.hknitrazeny.sk

Hokejový klub Nitra ženy (English: Hockey Club Nitra Women), abbreviated as HK Nitra ženy, is a professional women's ice hockey club based in the city of Nitra, Slovakia. The club competes in the Slovak Women's Ice Hockey League and plays its home games at Hokejová hala Klokočina.

== History ==
A women's ice hockey team had already existed in Nitra in the first half of the 1990s, but it folded after a short period. In 2026, following two and a half years of preparation, a women's ice hockey team was established in the city of Nitra under the name HK Nitra ženy. Although the new club adopted the logo and kit design of the men's team, HK Nitra ženy operates independently of HK Nitra. Karol Jurík became the club's first chairman and general manager, while Tomáš Segíň was appointed its first head coach. HK Nitra ženy thus became only the second women's ice hockey club in western Slovakia. The new team's inaugural squad included as many as ten Slovak women's national team players, three of whom had represented Slovakia at senior level. Laura Jancsóová was appointed the team's first captain. Since its establishment, the club has played its home games at the Ice Hockey Arena in Klokočina, a district of Nitra.

HK Nitra ženy played their first match on 10 August 2026 against Canadian club The North Hockey, winning 8–1. The match was played at Nitra Aréna, with 350 spectators attending the club's inaugural game. HK Nitra ženy played their first league match on 20 September 2026 against MHK Martin, winning 10–2.

== Home arena ==
The club plays its home games at the ice hockey arena in the Klokočina district of Nitra. The arena has a seating capacity of 288 and was built in 2013. The arena remained closed from 2020 until 2025, when the City of Nitra reopened it.

== Players ==
=== Current roster ===
As of 12 November 2026.

No.	Nat	Player	Pos	S/G	Age	Acquired	Birthplace
28	(Argentina)	Melina Avinon	RW	R	32	2026	Buenos Aires, Argentina
81	(Canada)	Abigail Byrne	LW	L	21	2026	Ottawa, Ontario, Canada
5	(Slovakia)	Petra Brimusová	RW	L	14	2026	Slovakia
11	(Slovakia)	Ema Fanturová	D	L	16	2026	Slovakia
39	(Slovakia)	Janka Gmiterková	RW	L	21	2026	Slovakia
31	(Slovakia)	Sofia Hajnalová	G	R	16	2026	Slovakia
55	(Slovakia)	Nina Hasprová	D	L	15	2026	Slovakia
99	(Slovakia)	Karin Hrušková	D	L	16	2026	Slovakia
10	(Slovakia)	Laura Jancsóová (C)	C	L	21	2026	Slovakia
13	(Slovakia)	Alica Juríková (A)	LW	L	18	2026	Slovakia
12	(Slovakia)	Lenka Karkošková (A)	LW	R	18	2026	Slovakia
29	(Poland)	Paulína Kuczera	G	L	34	2026	Katowice, Poland
88	(Slovakia)	Viktória Kyselicová	D	L	14	2026	Slovakia
	(United States)	Courtney Leising	RW	L	22–23	2026	Maple Grove, Minnesota, USA
98	(Slovakia)	Bianka Masláková	D	L	19	2026	Slovakia
32	(Slovakia)	Ivana Melicherčíková	D	L	16	2026	Slovakia
9	(Slovakia)	Nina Mikulášiková	G	L	25	2026	Slovakia
25	(Slovakia)	Vanesa Mikulášiková (A)	C	L	18	2026	Slovakia
18	(Slovakia)	Dominika Miškovičová	RW	R	17	2026	Slovakia
41	(United States)	Kayla Persinger	D	L	22	2026	Youngstown, New York, USA
15	(Slovakia)	Nikola Rumanová	C	L	26	2026	Martin, Slovakia
21	(Slovakia)	Laura Supeková	D	L	16	2026	Slovakia
84	(Slovakia)	Ema Tonkovičová	LW	L	18	2026	Slovakia
19	(Slovakia)	Laura Turňová	RW	L	18	2026	Slovakia

=== Team captains ===
- Laura Jancsóová, 2026-
