= Philippines at the World Games =

- IOC code: PHI
- Medals Ranked 62nd: Gold 2 Silver 5 Bronze 5 Total 12

World Games appearances (overview)
- 1981; 1985; 1989; 1993; 1997; 2001; 2005; 2009; 2013; 2017; 2022; 2025

The Philippines has participated at the World Games since its inception in 1981. It has won at least a medal in every edition of the World Games except the 1981 and 2005 editions. The first gold medal won for the nation was by cue sports player Carlo Biado who won the men's nine-ball singles event in the 2017 World Games. The first gold by a woman athlete is by Junna Tsukii in kumite 50kg division in the 2022 World Games.

== Medal count ==
Ranking is based on total gold medals earned.

Games	Athletes	Gold	Silver	Bronze	Total	Rank
(United States) 1981 Santa Clara	–	0	0	0	–	–
(United Kingdom) 1985 London	–	0	2	1	3	23
(Germany) 1989 Karlsruhe	–	0	2	0	2	25
(Netherlands) 1993 The Hague	–	0	0	1	1	45
(Finland) 1997 Lahti	–	0	0	1	1	44
(Japan) 2001 Akita	–	0	1	0	1	42
(Germany) 2005 Duisburg	–	0	0	0	–	–
(Chinese Taipei) 2009 Kaohsiung	9	0	0	1	1	55
(Colombia) 2013 Cali	3	0	0	1	1	53
(Poland) 2017 Wrocław	3	1	0	0	1	39
(United States) 2022 Birmingham	7	1	0	0	1	47
(China) 2025 Chengdu	47	0	2	2	4	60
Total		2	7	7	16	63

== Medals by sport ==
Sport	Gold	Silver	Bronze	Total
Cue sports	1	1	0	2
Karate	1	0	0	1
Bowling	0	2	5	7
Taekwondo	0	2	0	2
Totals (4 entries)	2	5	5	12

== Medalists ==
The first medals won by competitors for the Philippines at the World Games was obtained in the 1985 edition in London, United Kingdom. The medals consists of two silvers won by taekwondo athletes Arnold Baradi and Mike Ventossa and a bronze by ten-pin bowlers Olivia "Bong" Coo and Rene Reyes competing in the mixed doubles events. The Philippines has consistently won at least one medal in every edition except the 1981 and 2005 editions.

It was only in the 2017 edition in Wroclaw, Poland, did the Philippines won its first gold medal. The medal was won by cue sports player, Carlo Biado in the men's single nine-ball event.

Medal	Name	Games	Sport	Event
Gold	Junna Tsukii	Birmingham 2022	Kumite	Women's 50kg
Gold	Carlo Biado	Wroclaw 2017	Cue sports	Nine-ball – men's singles
Silver	Kaila Napolis	Chengdu 2025	Ju-jitsu	Women's 52 kg
Silver	Chezka Centeno	Chengdu 2025	Billards	Women's ten-ball
Silver	Marlon Manalo	Akita 2001	Cue sports	Men's snooker
Silver	Arianne Cerdeña	Karlsruhe 1989	Tenpin bowling	Women's singles
Silver	Arianne Cerdeña; Jorge Fernandez	Karlsruhe 1989	Tenpin bowling	Mixed doubles
Silver	Arnold Baradi	London 1985	Taekwondo	Men's finweight
Silver	Mike Ventossa	London 1985	Taekwondo	Men's flyweight
Bronze	Carlos Baylon Jr.	Chengdu 2025	Wushu	Men's sanda 56 kg
Bronze	Aislinn Yap	Chengdu 2025	Sambo	Women's combat 80 kg
Bronze	Dennis Orcollo	Cali 2013	Cue sports	Nine-ball – men's singles
Bronze	Liza Del Rosario	Kaohsiung 2009	Tenpin bowling	Women's singles
Bronze	Rafael Nepomuceno	Lahti 1997	Tenpin bowling	Men's singles
Bronze	Rafael Nepomuceno	Hague 1993	Tenpin bowling	Men's singles
Bronze	Bong Coo; Rene Reyes	London 1985	Tenpin bowling	Mixed doubles

Source:World Games

== Hosting bid ==
Philippine Sports Commission chairman Patrick Gregorio proposed that the Philippines could bid to host the 2033 World Games during a meeting with International World Games Association President José Perurena López and Chief Executive Officer Joachim Gossow on 9 August 2025.
