= Philippines at the 2013 World Games =

- IOC code: PHI

in Cali, Colombia 25 July 2013 – 4 August 2013
- Competitors: 3 in 2 sports
- Medals: Gold 0 Silver 0 Bronze 1 Total 1

World Games appearances (overview)
- 1981; 1985; 1989; 1993; 1997; 2001; 2005; 2009; 2013; 2017; 2022; 2025

The Philippines competed at the 2013 World Games held in Cali, Colombia.

== Medalists ==
Medal	Name	Sport	Event
Bronze	Dennis Orcollo	Cue sports	Nine-ball – Men's singles

== Bowling ==
Kenneth Chua and Maria Liza del Rosario competed in bowling.

Athlete	Event	Qualification		Semifinal		Final	
Athlete	Event	Result	Rank	Result	Rank	Result	Rank
Kenneth Chua	Men's singles	4004	13	did not advance			
Maria Liza del Rosario	Women's singles	3696	13	did not advance			
Maria Liza del Rosario; Kenneth Chua	Mixed doubles	2605	9	did not advance			

== Cue sports ==
Dennis Orcollo won the bronze medal in the men's singles event.

Athlete	Event	Round of 16	Quarterfinals	Semifinals	Final	
Athlete	Event	Opposition Result	Opposition Result	Opposition Result	Opposition Result	Rank
Dennis Orcollo	Nine-ball – men's singles	Rojas (CHI); W 11–3	Chamat (SWE); W 11–2	Appleton (GBR); L 9–11	Liu (CHN); W 11–5	3rd place, bronze medalist(s)

== Duathlon ==
Carlo Pedregosa and Mirasol Abad competed in duathlon. Pedregosa was lapped after finishing the first run of the men's event while Abad was able to complete all races and finished 17th overall. Duathlon was an invitational sport.

Athlete	Event	Run (10 km)	Trans 1	Bike (37 km)	Trans 2	Run (5 km)	Total Time	Rank
Carlo Pedregosa	Men's	38:17	0:28	Lapped				
Mirasol Abad	Women's	39:50	0:31	1:06:25	0:45	20:48	2:08:19	17
