= 2017 Men's Asia-Oceania Floorball Cup =

Tournament details
- Host country: Thailand
- Venue: 1 (in 1 host city)
- Dates: 1–6 July
- Teams: 8

Final positions
- Champions: Thailand (1st title)
- Runners-up: Singapore
- Third place: South Korea
- Fourth place: Indonesia

Tournament statistics
- Matches played: 18
- Goals scored: 261 (14.5 per match)
- Scoring leader(s): (Thailand) Pawat Thaidit

The 2017 Men's Asia-Oceania Floorball Cup was a continental floorball tournament held in Bangkok, Thailand from 1–6 July 2017. It was held at the Chanatrayingyong Gymnasium of the Chulalongkorn University. Eight national floorball teams participated in the tournament.

This tournament is the inaugural edition of the Asia-Oceania Floorball Cup (AOFC) organized by the Asia Oceania Floorball Confederation. It succeeds the Asia Pacific Floorball Championships.

Thailand became the first champions of the AOFC beating Singapore in the final. Both teams were undefeated before the final.

== Preliminary round ==
=== Group A ===
Team	Pld	W	D	L	GF	GA	GD	Pts	Qualification
Singapore	3	3	0	0	43	1	+42	6	Semifinals
Philippines	3	2	0	1	10	20	−10	4	Quarterfinals
Iran	3	1	0	2	7	24	−17	2	Quarterfinals
China	3	0	0	3	6	21	−15	0	Classification 5th–8th

1 July 2017; 09:30	Philippines	4 – 3	China	Chanatrayingyong Gymnasium, Bangkok

Game reference

1 July 2017; 19:03	Singapore	16 – 0	Iran	Chanatrayingyong Gymnasium, Bangkok

Game reference

2 July 2017; 10:01	China	0 – 13	Singapore	Chanatrayingyong Gymnasium, Bangkok

Game reference

2 July 2017; 15:59	Iran	3 – 5	Philippines	Chanatrayingyong Gymnasium, Bangkok

Game reference

3 July 2017; 13:00	Singapore	14 – 1	Philippines	Chanatrayingyong Gymnasium, Bangkok

Game reference

3 July 2017; 19:25	China	3 – 4	Iran	Chanatrayingyong Gymnasium, Bangkok

Game reference

=== Group B ===
Team	Pld	W	D	L	GF	GA	GD	Pts	Qualification
Thailand	3	3	0	0	46	4	+42	6	Semifinals
South Korea	3	2	0	1	19	19	0	4	Quarterfinals
Indonesia	3	1	0	2	14	23	−9	2	Quarterfinals
India	3	0	0	3	10	43	−33	0	Classification 5th–8th

1 July 2017; 12:02	South Korea	8 – 4	Indonesia	Chanatrayingyong Gymnasium, Bangkok

Game reference

1 July 2017; 16:03	Thailand	23 – 3	India	Chanatrayingyong Gymnasium, Bangkok

Game reference

2 July 2017; 13:07	Indonesia	0 – 12	Thailand	Chanatrayingyong Gymnasium, Bangkok

Game reference

2 July 2017; 19:00	India	4 – 10	South Korea	Chanatrayingyong Gymnasium, Bangkok

Game reference

3 July 2017; 10:01	India	3 – 10	Indonesia	Chanatrayingyong Gymnasium, Bangkok

Game reference

3 July 2017; 16:05	Thailand	11 – 1	South Korea	Chanatrayingyong Gymnasium, Bangkok

Game reference

== Final round ==
Quarterfinals
Singapore
bye
4 July – Bangkok
South Korea	7
Iran	1
Thailand
bye
4 July – Bangkok
Philippines	4
Indonesia	7

Semifinals
5 July – Bangkok
Singapore	11
South Korea	0
5 July – Bangkok
Thailand	15
Indonesia	2

Final
6 July – Bangkok
Singapore	4
Thailand	8
Third place game
6 July – Bangkok
South Korea	4
Indonesia	2

=== Classification 5th–8th ===
Classification Semifinals
5 July – Bangkok
China	2 (1)
Philippines	2
5 July – Bangkok
India	9
Iran	6

Fifth place game
6 July – Bangkok
China	4
India	6
Seventh place game
6 July – Bangkok
Philippines	4
Iran	7

=== Quarterfinals ===
Thailand and Singapore as the top teams in their group directly advances to the Semifinals.

4 July 2017; 14:30	Philippines	4 – 7 (2–3, 1–3, 1–1)	Indonesia	Chanatrayingyong Gymnasium, Bangkok; Attendance: 60

Game reference
Referee: Sharil Ismail (Singapore), Oswind Rosayro (Singapore)

4 July 2017; 17:30	South Korea	7 – 1 (3–0, 2–1, 2–0)	Iran	Chanatrayingyong Gymnasium, Bangkok; Attendance: 50

Game reference
Referee: Fajar Hidayat (Indonesia), Yonkgy Priyanto (Indonesia)

=== Semifinals ===
5 July 2017; 16:05	Thailand	15 – 2 (5–0, 4–1, 6–1)	Indonesia	Chanatrayingyong Gymnasium, Bangkok; Attendance: 100

Game reference
Referee: Sharil Ismail (Singapore), Oswind Rosayro (Singapore)

5 July 2017; 19:00	Singapore	11 – 0 (4–0, 3–0, 4–0)	South Korea	Chanatrayingyong Gymnasium, Bangkok; Attendance: 50

Game reference
Referee: Fajar Hidayat (Indonesia), Yonkgy Priyanto (Indonesia)

=== Classification 5th–8th ===
5 July 2017; 09:59	China	3 – 2 OT (1–0, 0–0, 1–2); 1–0 OT	Philippines	Chanatrayingyong Gymnasium, Bangkok; Attendance: 50

Game reference
Referee: Lee Young-june (South Korea), Shin Jong-suk (South Korea)

5 July 2017; 13:03	India	9 – 6 (5–3, 3–2, 1–1)	Iran	Chanatrayingyong Gymnasium, Bangkok; Attendance: 50

Game reference
Referee: Jaey Jetpuria (Malaysia), Kenny Khoo (Malaysia)

Seventh place playoff

6 July 2017; 9:30	Philippines	4 – 7 (0–1, 1–3, 3–3)	Iran	Chanatrayingyong Gymnasium, Bangkok; Attendance: 80

Game reference
Referee: Sharil Ismail (Singapore), Oswind Rosayro (Singapore)

Fifth place playoff

6 July 2017; 12:10	China	4 – 6 (3–1, 1–3, 0–2)	India	Chanatrayingyong Gymnasium, Bangkok; Attendance: 50

Game reference
Referee: Jaey Jetpuria (Malaysia), Kenny Khoo (Malaysia)

=== Playoffs ===
==== Bronze medal match ====
6 July 2017; 15:03	South Korea	4 – 2 (2–0, 2–1, 0–1)	Indonesia	Chanatrayingyong Gymnasium, Bangkok; Attendance: 150

Game reference
Referee: Sharil Ismail (Singapore), Oswind Rosayro (Singapore)

==== Final ====
6 July 2017; 19:05	Singapore	4 – 8 (1–3, 2–3, 1–3)	Thailand	Chanatrayingyong Gymnasium, Bangkok; Attendance: 200

Game reference
Referee: Fajar Hidayat (Indonesia), Yonkgy Priyanto (Indonesia)

== Final standing ==
The official IFF final ranking of the tournament:

Rank	Team
Gold medal	Thailand
Silver medal	Singapore
Bronze medal	South Korea
4	Indonesia
5	India
6	China
7	Iran
8	Philippines
