= Philippines at the 2017 World Games =

Philippines at the World Games 2017
- IOC code: PHI

in Wrocław, Poland 20 July 2017 – 30 July 2017
- Competitors: 3 in 2 sports
- Medals Ranked 39th: Gold 1 Silver 0 Bronze 0 Total 1

World Games appearances (overview)
- 1981; 1985; 1989; 1993; 1997; 2001; 2005; 2009; 2013; 2017; 2022; 2025

The Philippines competed at the World Games 2017 in Wrocław, Poland, from 20 July 2017 to 30 July 2017. It was in this edition that the Philippines won its first-ever gold medal; courtesy of cue sports player Carlo Biado.

== Competitors ==
Sports	Men	Women	Total	Events
Archery	0	1	1	1
Cue Sports	1	1	2	2
Total	2	1	3	3

== Medalists ==
Medal	Name	Sport	Event	Date
Gold	Carlo Biado	Cue sports	Nine-ball – men's singles	July 29

== Archery ==
Aya Cojuangco qualified a place in the 2017 World Games by clinching a silver in the women's compound event of the 2017 Asia Cup despite having recently recovered from an injury. In the Round of 32, Cojuangco defeated Amelie Sancenot of France before losing to Cassidy Cox of the United States in the Round of 16.

Individual

Athlete	Event	Ranking round		Round of 32	Round of 16	Quarterfinals	Semifinals	Final / BM	Rank
Athlete	Event	Score	Seed	Opposition Score	Opposition Score	Opposition Score	Opposition Score	Opposition Score	Rank
Amaya Cojuangco	Individual compound	673	23	Sancenot (FRA); W 144–140	Cox (USA); L 140–145	Did not advance			9

== Cue sports ==
Carlo Biado competed in the nine-ball men's singles event. He reached the final of his event after winning his matches against Joshua Filler of Germany in the round of 16, Mieszko Fortuński of Poland in the quarterfinals, and Naoyuki Ōi of Japan in the quarterfinals.

He won the country's first-ever gold medal in the World Games after defeating Jayson Shaw of Great Britain in the final of the men's nine-ball event.

Chezka Centeno is the other competitor who lost to Han Yu of China in the bronze medal match of the nine-ball women's singles event.

Athlete	Event	Round of 16	Quarterfinals	Semifinals	Final	
Athlete	Event	Opposition Result	Opposition Result	Opposition Result	Opposition Result	Rank
Carlo Biado	Nine-ball – men's singles	Filler (GER); W 11–5	Fortuński (POL); W 11–9	Ōi (JPN); W 11–7	Shaw (GBR); W 11–7	1st place, gold medalist(s)
Chezka Centeno	Nine-ball – women's singles	Kasemchaiyanan (NZL); W 9–2	Chou C. (TPE); W 9–8	Chen S. (CHN); L 6–9	Han Y. (CHN); L 3–9	4
