= India men's national floorball team =

National floorball team of India

- Founded: 2005
- First game: 2–41, vs. Singapore (1 December 2005)
- Largest win: 9–5, vs. Pakistan (12 July 2019)
- Largest defeat: 0–59, vs. Japan (26 March 2009)

India men's national floorball team is the national men's team that represents India in international floorball competitions, events and friendly matches. It operates under the auspices of the Indian Floorball Federation (FFI). It played its first international match in 2005. In February 2018, it was ranked last in the IFF world rankings – 41st.

The team has not yet achieved any significant success, having won its first international matches only in 2017. It finished last in both continental championship tournaments in which it participated, without a point. In 2017, it participated in the newly created Asia-Oceania Cup in Thailand, where it managed to win two matches and take 5th place overall.

== Events ==
=== World Floorball Championships ===
1996 – 2024 : Did Not Compete

=== Asia Pacific Floorball Championship ===
Champions Runners up Third place Fourth place

Asia Pacific Floorball Championship
| Year | Position | M | W | D | L | GF | GA | GD |
|---|---|---|---|---|---|---|---|---|
| (Singapore) 2004 | Did Not Compete | | | | | | | |
| (Singapore) 2005 | 5th Place | 4 | 0 | 0 | 4 | 5 | 135 | -130 |
| (Singapore) 2006 | Did Not Compete | | | | | | | |
| (Singapore) 2007 | Did Not Compete | | | | | | | |
| (Australia) 2008 | Did Not Compete | | | | | | | |
| (South Korea) 2009 | 6th Place | 5 | 0 | 0 | 5 | 1 | 199 | -198 |
| (Singapore) 2010 | Did Not Compete | | | | | | | |
| (Australia) 2011 | Did Not Compete | | | | | | | |
| (Japan) 2012 | Did Not Compete | | | | | | | |
| Total | 2/9 | 9 | 0 | 0 | 9 | 6 | 334 | -328 |

=== Asia-Oceania Floorball Cup ===
Champions Runners up Third place Fourth place

Asia-Oceania Floorball Cup
| Year | Position | M | W | D | L | GF | GA | GD |
|---|---|---|---|---|---|---|---|---|
| (Thailand) 2017 | 5th Place | 5 | 1 | 0 | 4 | 30 | 45 | -15 |
| (Philippines) 2019 | 7th Place | 5 | 2 | 0 | 3 | 25 | 53 | -28 |
| (Singapore) 2022 | Did Not Compete | | | | | | | |
| (China) 2025 | Did Not Compete | | | | | | | |
| Total | 2/4 | 10 | 3 | 0 | 7 | 55 | 98 | -43 |
