= Floorball at the 2025 World Games – Men's tournament =

2024 Floorball at the 2025 World Games (Men's tournament)
Tournament details
- Host country: China
- Venue: 1 (in 1 host city)
- Dates: 6 – 13 August
- Teams: 8

Final positions
- Champions: Sweden
- Runners-up: Finland
- Third place: Czech Republic

The men's floorball tournament at the 2025 World Games was the third men's floorball tournament at the World Games, held from 6 to 13 August 2025 as part of the 2025 World Games in Chengdu, China.

The Swedish national team defended its title from both previous editions of the World Games by defeating Finland in the final. The Czech Republic once again secured the bronze medal with a victory over Switzerland.

As in the previous tournaments at World Games, team rosters were limited to 14 players. Matches were shortened to three 15-minute periods (instead of the standard 20 minutes). Despite the shorter playing time, Finland achieved a record result in the group stage with a 42–0 win against China.

== Qualification ==
The men's tournament automatically included the host nation China, for which it was the debut at a major international tournament. Other countries qualified based on their placement at the 2024 World Championships. From there, the five best European teams and the best Asia–Oceania team from the main tournament advanced, along with the only automatically qualified team from the Americas.

Qualification method		Date	Venue	Berths	Qualified team
Host nation		—	—	1	China
2024 World Championships	Asia-Oceania	7–15 December 2024	Sweden	1	Philippines
2024 World Championships	Europe	7–15 December 2024	Sweden	5	Finland
2024 World Championships	Europe	7–15 December 2024	Sweden	5	Sweden
2024 World Championships	Europe	7–15 December 2024	Sweden	5	Czech Republic
2024 World Championships	Europe	7–15 December 2024	Sweden	5	Latvia
2024 World Championships	Europe	7–15 December 2024	Sweden	5	Switzerland
2024 World Championships – Americas qualification		17–18 February	(Canada) Toronto	1	Canada
Total				8	

== Tournament format ==
In the group stage, teams played each other from 6 to 10 August 2025. The top two teams from each group advanced to a two-round play-off held between 11 and 13 August, while the remaining teams played for placement.

== Preliminary round ==
=== Group A ===
Pos	Team	Pld	W	D	L	GF	GA	GD	Pts	Qualification
1	Sweden	3	3	0	0	26	3	+23	6	Semifinals
2	Switzerland	3	2	0	1	23	11	+12	4	Semifinals
3	Latvia	3	1	0	2	16	13	+3	2	Fifth place game
4	Philippines	3	0	0	3	3	41	−38	0	Seventh place game

Source: TWG 2025

6 August 2025; 11:15	Latvia	3–4 (0–1, 2–1, 1–2)	Switzerland	Xindu Xiangcheng Sports Centre, Chengdu

Game reference
Gabriels Silins	Goalies	Nils Schalin	Referees: (Sweden) Glenn Boström (Sweden) Håkan Söderman

7 August 2025; 09:00	Latvia	12–2 (2–1, 4–0, 6–1)	Philippines	Xindu Xiangcheng Sports Centre, Chengdu

Game reference
Referees: (Sweden) Glenn Boström (Sweden) Håkan Söderman

7 August 2025; 13:30	Sweden	8–1 (1–0, 4–1, 3–0)	Switzerland	Xindu Xiangcheng Sports Centre, Chengdu

Game reference

9 August 2025; 11:45	Philippines	1–11 (0–2, 1–5, 0–4)	Sweden	Xindu Xiangcheng Sports Centre, Chengdu

Game reference

10 August 2025; 15:00	Switzerland	18–0 (3–0, 7–0, 8–0)	Philippines	Xindu Xiangcheng Sports Centre, Chengdu

Game reference

10 August 2025; 17:15	Sweden	7–1 (2–1, 3–0, 2–0)	Latvia	Xindu Xiangcheng Sports Centre, Chengdu

Game reference

=== Group B ===
Pos	Team	Pld	W	D	L	GF	GA	GD	Pts	Qualification
1	Finland	3	3	0	0	74	3	+71	6	Semifinals
2	Czech Republic	3	2	0	1	67	9	+58	4	Semifinals
3	Canada	3	1	0	2	17	54	−37	2	Fifth place game
4	China (H)	3	0	0	3	1	93	−92	0	Seventh place game

Source: TWG 2025
(H) Hosts

6 August 2025; 13:30	China	0–42 (0–10, 0–14, 0–18)	Finland	Xindu Xiangcheng Sports Centre, Chengdu

Game reference

6 August 2025; 18:00	Czech Republic	29–1 (7–0, 11–1, 11–0)	Canada	Xindu Xiangcheng Sports Centre, Chengdu

Game reference

8 August 2025; 11:45	Finland	24–1 (8–0, 7–0, 9–1)	Canada	Xindu Xiangcheng Sports Centre, Chengdu

Game reference

8 August 2025; 17:15	Czech Republic	36–0 (14–0, 14–0, 8–0)	China	Xindu Xiangcheng Sports Centre, Chengdu

Game reference

9 August 2025; 19:30	Finland	8–2 (1–2, 1–0, 6–0)	Czech Republic	Xindu Xiangcheng Sports Centre, Chengdu

Game reference

10 August 2025; 19:30	Canada	15–1 (6–0, 4–1, 5–0)	China	Xindu Xiangcheng Sports Centre, Chengdu

Game reference

== Final round ==
Semifinals
11 August
Sweden (ET)	5
Czech Republic	4
11 August
Finland	4
Switzerland	0

Final
13 August
Sweden	2
Finland	1
Third place
13 August
Czech Republic	7
Switzerland	2

=== Semifinals ===
11 August 2025; 13:00	Sweden	5–4 (1–1, 1–1, 2–2, 1–0)	Czech Republic	Xindu Xiangcheng Sports Centre, Chengdu

Game reference

11 August 2025; 19:00	Finland	4–0 (0–0, 2–0, 2–0)	Switzerland	Xindu Xiangcheng Sports Centre, Chengdu

Game reference

=== Seventh place game ===
12 August 2025; 10:30	Philippines	14–0 (3–0, 7–0, 4–0)	China	Xindu Xiangcheng Sports Centre, Chengdu

Game reference

=== Fifth place game ===
12 August 2025; 19:00	Latvia	12–3 (5–0, 4–2, 3–1)	Canada	Xindu Xiangcheng Sports Centre, Chengdu

Game reference

=== Bronze medal game ===
13 August 2025; 09:00	Czech Republic	7–2 (4–0, 1–0, 2–2)	Switzerland	Xindu Xiangcheng Sports Centre, Chengdu

Game reference

=== Gold medal game ===
13 August 2025; 15:00	Sweden	2–1 (1–0, 1–0, 0–1)	Finland	Xindu Xiangcheng Sports Centre, Chengdu

Game reference

== Final ranking ==
Rank	Team
1st place, gold medalist(s)	Sweden
2nd place, silver medalist(s)	Finland
3rd place, bronze medalist(s)	Czech Republic
4	Switzerland
5	Latvia
6	Canada
7	Philippines
8	China

== All-star team ==
Tournament all-star team:

- Best goalkeeper: (Sweden) Jon Hedlund
- Best defenders: (Finland) Eemeli Akola, (Sweden) Oskar Hovlund
- Best forwards: (Finland) Juuso Ahola, (Sweden) Oskar Weissbach
- Best center: (Czech Republic) Filip Langer

== See also ==
- Floorball at the 2025 World Games
  - Women's tournament
