= Nitra Aréna =

Arena in Nitra, Slovakia

Coordinates: 48°19′13″N 18°05′15″E

TIPOSBET Aréna
- Nitra Aréna
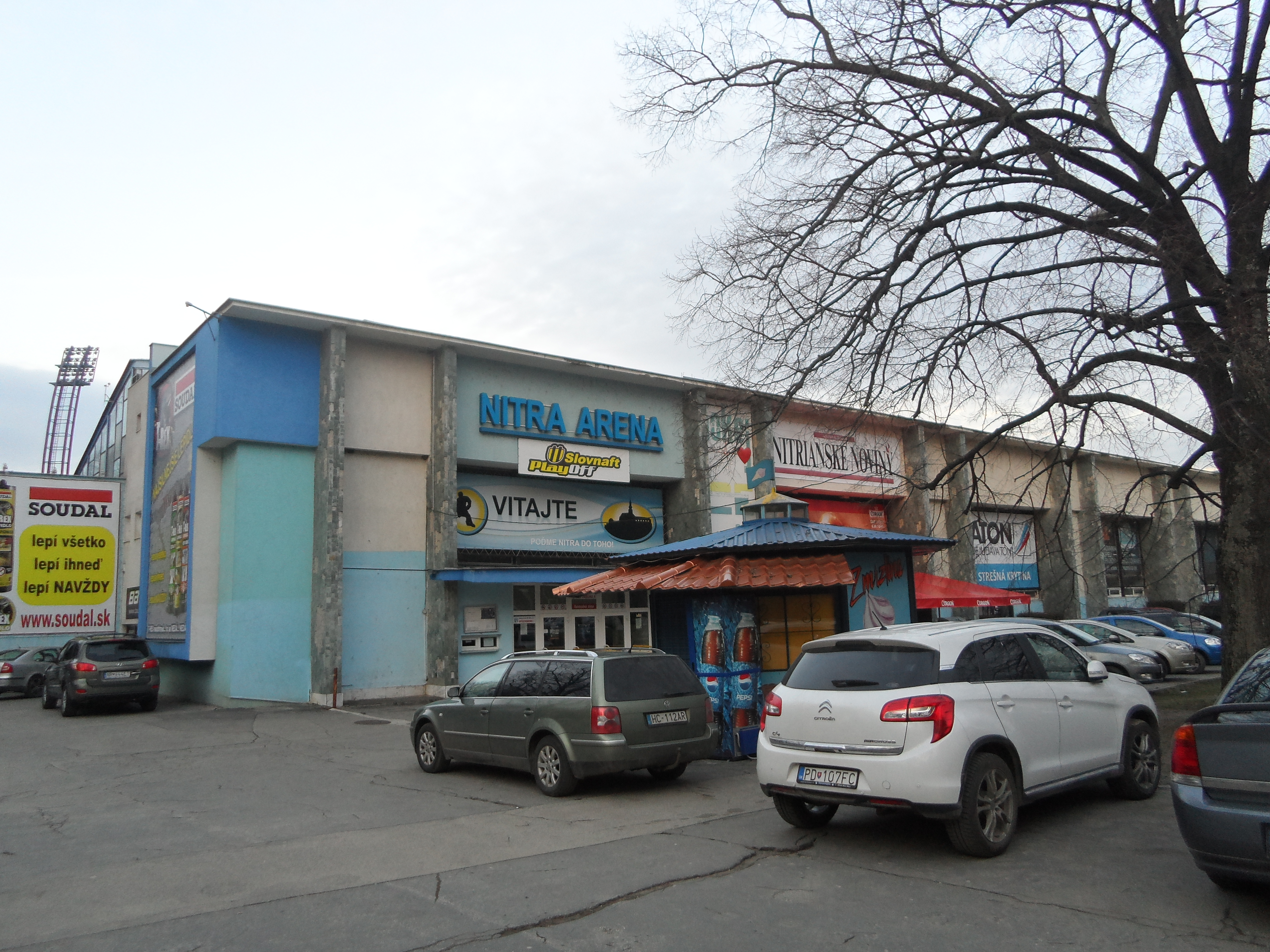
- Interactive map of TIPOSBET Aréna
- Location: Jesenského 2 Nitra, Slovakia
- Owner: City of Nitra
- Capacity: 3,600 (Ice hockey)

Construction
- Groundbreaking: 1955
- Opened: 1957
- Renovated: 1973; 2015; 2017

Tenant
- HK Nitra (Slovak Extraliga) (1957 - present)

Nitra Aréna is an arena in Nitra, Slovakia. The arena's current sponsored name is TIPOSBET Aréna. It is primarily used for ice hockey and is the home arena of HK Nitra. It has a capacity of 3,600 people. The arena was built in 1957, roofed in 1973, and renovated in 2015 and 2017.

== History ==
The first ice hockey matches in Nitra were played as early as the 1920s on natural ice, with the playing area enclosed by a simple wooden barrier only a few centimetres high. These matches were played on frozen bodies of water in Sihoť Park, where, before the regulation of the Nitra River, the river had no fixed channel. The area where Štadión pod Zoborom football stadium currently stands eventually became an established location for ice hockey.

In 1955, construction began on an outdoor ice hockey stadium with an artificial ice rink on the site of the original football stadium. The new ice hockey stadium effectively swapped places with the football stadium, as a new football stadium was built on the site of the original ice hockey rink. The two sports grounds were located immediately next to each other. The new outdoor ice hockey stadium, featuring an artificial ice rink and a refrigeration plant, was completed in 1957. Steel prefabricated stands for spectators were added to the stadium. In 1973, the roof over the ice hockey stadium was completed, giving the arena its current appearance. The stadium's capacity at this time was 4,800 seats. In 2001, the adjacent covered ice rink, located immediately next to the arena, was opened to the public. In 2005, a new stand was built behind one of the goals, increasing the arena's capacity to 5,300 seats. Following subsequent modernisations, the capacity was reduced to its current 3,600 seats. The arena was originally known as Zimný štadión Nitra (English: Nitra Ice Hockey Stadium) and has been known as Nitra Aréna since 2007. The arena has undergone several major renovations, most recently in 2015 and 2017.

=== Plans for the construction of a new stadium ===
In 2024, the first plans for the construction of a new ice hockey arena with a planned capacity of 5,500 seats were unveiled. The new arena is also expected to include two practice ice rinks. The estimated cost in 2024 was €60 million, with construction scheduled to begin in 2027.

In 2026, several architectural firms were selected to participate in a design competition for the new arena. The planned capacity is expected to remain at 5,500 seats, while the capacity could be increased to up to 7,000 for concerts and other cultural events. The new arena is planned to be built on the site of the existing adjacent covered ice rink, which is located immediately next to the current arena.

== Transport connections ==
The stadium is located immediately next to Sihoť Park in the city of Nitra, directly beneath Nitra Castle. A large car and bus parking area is located in front of the stadium. Next to the car park is a stop for city bus route 35, which runs from the Klokočina housing estate through the city centre to the stadium. Other city bus services stop approximately 700 metres from the stadium at the Predmostie bus stop, including routes 1, 6, 9, 10, 17, 26, 27 and 30.

== Notable events ==
An overview of some sport events:

1987

- 1987 IIHF World Under-20 Championship

2018

- WBHF World Junior Ball Hockey Championships (u14, u16, u18, u20 men & u20 women)
