= China men's national floorball team =

- Founded: 2017
- Coach: (China) Li Ji
- IFF Ranking: 33rd (2024)
- First game: 3–4 vs. Philippines (Bangkok, 1 July 2017)
- Largest win: 3–2 OT, vs. Philippines (Bangkok, 4 July 2017)
- Largest defeat: 0–42, vs. Finland (Chengdu, 6 August 2025)

The China men's national floorball team is the national floorball team of China and is organized by the China Floorball Federation.

They made their international debut at the 2017 Men's Asia-Oceania Floorball Cup. China lost all their group stage matches but secured their first international victory in the classification semifinals by defeating the Philippines 3–2 in over time but lost to India in the playoff for 5th place. They finished 6th out of eight teams.

The Chinese floorball team debuted at the World Games in the 2025 edition in China. That team was formed in February 2025.

== World Games ==
| Year | Hosting Country | Rank | Final match |
|---|---|---|---|
| 2025 | China | 8th place | Philippines 0–14 |

== Results ==
| Year | M | W | D | L | GF | GA | GD | Ref |
|---|---|---|---|---|---|---|---|---|
| 2017 | 5 | 1 | 0 | 4 | 13 | 29 | -16 | |
| 2018 | 4 | 0 | 0 | 4 | 3 | 94 | -91 | |
| 2019 | Did Not Compete | | | | | | | |
| 2020 | Did Not Compete | | | | | | | |
| 2021 | Did Not Compete | | | | | | | |
| 2022 | Did Not Compete | | | | | | | |
| 2023 | Did Not Compete | | | | | | | |
| 2024 | 4 | 0 | 0 | 4 | 9 | 59 | -50 | |
| 2025 | 4 | 0 | 0 | 4 | 1 | 107 | -106 | |
| Total | 17 | 1 | 0 | 16 | 26 | 289 | -263 | |

== Records ==
=== Asia-Oceania Floorball Cup ===
| Tournament | GP | W | D | L | GF | GA | +/- |
|---|---|---|---|---|---|---|---|
| Bangkok 2017 | 5 | 1 | 0 | 4 | 13 | 29 | -16 |
| Totals | 5 | 1 | 0 | 4 | 13 | 29 | -16 |
