= 2027 Men's U-19 World Floorball Championships =

Floorball competition

Tournament details
- Host country: Latvia
- Dates: 17–21 February
- Teams: 16

The 2027 Men's U-19 World Floorball Championships will be the 14th edition of the championship. The tournament will be held instead of the traditional May in a new February schedule, following a change in the international floorball competition calendar, specifically from 17 to 21 February 2027 in Riga, Latvia. This will be the second time that Latvia hosts the junior championship, with the first time being in 2005.

Due to the swapping of the hosting years for the women's and men's junior championships, the Women's U-19 World Championships will also take place in May 2027 in this transitional year, and the following men's championship will take place already in 2028.

== Qualified teams ==
Host nation Team qualified directly Team qualified Team failed to qualify Did not enter

The final tournament will feature 16 national teams. The top nine teams from the previous championship in 2025, including host nation and sixth-placed Latvia, qualified directly. The remaining seven spots were determined through regional qualifiers.

From the Americas qualifier, held from 19 to 21 June 2026, in Chicago, United States, between the United States and Canada, the visiting team qualified.

The Asia-Oceania qualifier was held from 5 to 9 August 2026, in Singapore. Three out of the six participating teams secured qualification.

Two European qualifiers took place between 1 and 5 September 2026 in Guadarrama, Spain, and between 8 and 12 September in Jõgeva, Estonia. The best teams from the six in each qualifier and the better of the second-placed teams advanced.

	Date	Venue	Vacancies	Qualified
Automatically qualified from 2025		(Switzerland) Zurich	9	Finland; Czech Republic; Switzerland; Sweden; Slovakia; Latvia (H); Norway; Denmark; Germany
Americas qualification	19–21 June 2026	(United States) Chicago	1	Canada
Asian-Oceanian qualification	5–9 August 2026	Singapore	3	Singapore; Japan; Australia
European qualifier 1	1–5 September 2026	(Spain) Guadarrama	1+1	Poland; Spain
European qualifier 2	8–12 September 2026	(Estonia) Jõgeva	1	Estonia
Total			16	

== Venues ==
The Two Arenas are situated Riga. The final weekend matches will take place in the Xiaomi Arena.

Riga
Xiaomi Arena	Team Sports Hall

== Draw ==
The draw took place on 19 August 2026. The 16 participating countries were divided into four groups (A, B, C, and D). Groups A and B were drawn from the top teams of the previous championship in 2025. Groups C and D were formed from the remaining teams, with some selections made blindly, as the European qualifiers had not yet taken place at the time of the draw.

== Tournament format ==
In the group stage, teams will play in a round-robin format from 17 to 19 February 2027. A win will earn two points, while a draw will earn one point. The knockout stage and placement matches will take place on 20 and 21 February.

- The top two teams from Groups A and B will advance to the semi-finals of the championship play-offs.
- The third-placed teams from Groups A and B will compete for fifth place.
- The fourth-placed teams from Groups A and B, along with the first-placed teams from Groups C and D, will enter the semi-finals for placement matches deciding 7th to 10th place.
- The second-placed teams from Groups C and D will play for 11th place.
- The third-placed teams from Groups C and D will play for 13th place.
- The fourth-placed teams from Groups C and D will play for 15th place.

== Preliminary round ==
Times are EET (UTC+2).

=== Group A ===
Team	Pld	W	D	L	GF	GA	GD	Pts
Switzerland	0	0	0	0	0	0	0	0
Sweden	0	0	0	0	0	0	0	0
Slovakia	0	0	0	0	0	0	0	0
Norway	0	0	0	0	0	0	0	0

Source: IFF
Rules for classification: 1) points; 2) head-to-head points; 3) head-to-head goal difference;

17 February 2027; 13:00	Slovakia	–	Norway	Xiaomi Arena, Riga

Game reference

17 February 2027; 16:00	Switzerland	–	Sweden	Xiaomi Arena, Riga

Game reference

18 February 2027; 10:00	Switzerland	–	Slovakia	Xiaomi Arena, Riga

Game reference

18 February 2027; 13:00	Sweden	–	Norway	Team Sports Hall, Riga

Game reference

19 February 2027; 10:00	Sweden	–	Slovakia	Xiaomi Arena, Riga

Game reference

19 February 2027; 16:00	Norway	–	Switzerland	Team Sports Hall, Riga

Game reference

=== Group B ===
Team	Pld	W	D	L	GF	GA	GD	Pts
Finland	0	0	0	0	0	0	0	0
Czech Republic	0	0	0	0	0	0	0	0
Latvia	0	0	0	0	0	0	0	0
Denmark	0	0	0	0	0	0	0	0

Source: IFF
Rules for classification: 1) points; 2) head-to-head points; 3) head-to-head goal difference;

17 February 2027; 13:00	Czech Republic	–	Denmark	Team Sports Hall, Riga

Game reference

17 February 2027; 19:00	Finland	–	Latvia	Xiaomi Arena, Riga

Game reference

18 February 2027; 16:00	Finland	–	Czech Republic	Xiaomi Arena, Riga

Game reference

18 February 2027; 19:00	Latvia	–	Denmark	Xiaomi Arena, Riga

Game reference

19 February 2027; 19:00	Czech Republic	–	Latvia	Xiaomi Arena, Riga

Game reference

19 February 2027; 19:00	Denmark	–	Finland	Team Sports Hall, Riga

Game reference

=== Group C ===
Team	Pld	W	D	L	GF	GA	GD	Pts
Germany	0	0	0	0	0	0	0	0
Japan	0	0	0	0	0	0	0	0
Estonia	0	0	0	0	0	0	0	0
Poland	0	0	0	0	0	0	0	0

Source: IFF
Rules for classification: 1) points; 2) head-to-head points; 3) head-to-head goal difference;

17 February 2027; 16:00	Poland	–	Germany	Team Sports Hall, Riga

Game reference

17 February 2027; 19:00	Japan	–	Estonia	Team Sports Hall, Riga

Game reference

18 February 2027; 10:00	Germany	–	Japan	Team Sports Hall, Riga

Game reference

18 February 2027; 19:00	Estonia	–	Poland	Team Sports Hall, Riga

Game reference

19 February 2027; 13:00	Japan	–	Poland	Xiaomi Arena, Riga

Game reference

19 February 2027; 16:00	Germany	–	Estonia	Xiaomi Arena, Riga

Game reference

=== Group D ===
Team	Pld	W	D	L	GF	GA	GD	Pts
Australia	0	0	0	0	0	0	0	0
Singapore	0	0	0	0	0	0	0	0
Canada	0	0	0	0	0	0	0	0
Spain	0	0	0	0	0	0	0	0

Source: IFF
Rules for classification: 1) points; 2) head-to-head points; 3) head-to-head goal difference;

17 February 2027; 10:00	Spain	–	Australia	Xiaomi Arena, Riga

Game reference

17 February 2027; 10:00	Singapore	–	Canada	Team Sports Hall, Riga

Game reference

18 February 2027; 13:00	Australia	–	Singapore	Xiaomi Arena, Riga

Game reference

18 February 2027; 16:00	Canada	–	Spain	Team Sports Hall, Riga

Game reference

19 February 2027; 10:00	Singapore	–	Spain	Team Sports Hall, Riga

Game reference

19 February 2027; 13:00	Australia	–	Canada	Team Sports Hall, Riga

Game reference

== Placement round ==
=== 11th place game ===
20 February 2027; 16:00	C2	–	D2	Team Sports Hall, Riga

Game reference

=== 13th place game ===
20 February 2027; 13:00	D3	–	C3	Team Sports Hall, Riga

Game reference

=== 15th place game ===
20 February 2027; 10:00	C4	–	D4	Team Sports Hall, Riga

Game reference

=== 7th–10th placement play-off ===
==== 7th–10th placement bracket ====
7th–10th semifinals
20 February
A4
D1
20 February
B4
C1

7th place
21 February
WPO1
WPO2
9th place
21 February
LPO1
LPO2

==== 7th–10th placement semifinals ====
20 February 2027; 10:00	A4	–	D1	Xiaomi Arena, Riga

Game reference

20 February 2027; 19:00	B4	–	C1	Xiaomi Arena, Riga

Game reference

==== 7th place game ====
21 February 2027; 10:00	WPO1	–	WPO2	Team Sports Hall, Riga

Game reference

==== 9th place game ====
21 February 2027; 10:30	LPO1	–	LPO2	Xiaomi Arena, Riga

Game reference

=== 5th place game ===
20 February 2027; 19:00	A3	–	B3	Team Sports Hall, Riga

Game reference

== Knockout stage ==
=== Bracket ===
Semifinals
20 February
A1
B2
20 February
B1
A2

Final
21 February
WSF1
WSF2
Third place
21 February
LSF1
LSF2

=== Semifinals ===
20 February 2027; 13:00	A1	–	B2	Xiaomi Arena, Riga

Game reference

20 February 2027; 16:00	B1	–	A2	Xiaomi Arena, Riga

Game reference

=== Bronze medal game ===
21 February 2027; 13:30	LSF1	–	LSF2	Xiaomi Arena, Riga

Game reference

=== Gold medal game ===
21 February 2027; 17:00	WSF1	–	WSF2	Xiaomi Arena, Riga

Game reference
