= 2019 Men's U-19 World Floorball Championships B-Division =

Floorball competition

2019 Men's U-19 World Floorball Championships - B Division
Tournament details
- Host country: Canada
- Venues: 2
- Dates: May 8–12, 2019

Final positions
- Champions: Germany

Tournament statistics
- Matches played: 18
- Goals scored: 251 (13.94 per match)
- Scoring leader(s): (Russia) Vladimir Churkin (Germany) Nils Hofferbert (Germany) Ricardo Andre Wipfler Colonia (17 points)

The 2019 Men's U-19 World Floorball Championships B-Division took place in conjunction with the tenth world championships in men's under-19 floorball. The tournament took place from May 8–12, 2019 in Halifax, Canada, and was the first Men's U-19 WFC played outside of Europe.

== Qualification ==
26 teams registered for the tenth men's under-19 world championships.. The top eight teams from the 2017 U-19 WFC automatically qualified as part of the A-Division. Poland was relegated from the A-Division, Canada qualified automatically as the host, and the United States thus qualified automatically with the spot from the Americas, with the remainder of the teams competing to qualify for the five remaining spots in the B-Division.

In Europe, there were two qualification event locations - Moscow (Russia) and Bolzano (Italy). The Asia-Oceania group tournament took place in Wellington, New Zealand.

	Date	Venue	Teams	Vacancies	Qualified
Host Nation			Canada	1	Canada
Automatic Qualification			Poland	1	Poland
Automatic AMER Qualification			United States	1	United States
AOFC Qualifiers	27-29 September 2018	(New Zealand) Wellington	Australia Japan New Zealand	2	Japan New Zealand
EUR1 Qualifiers	5-9 September 2018	(Russia) Moscow	Belgium Estonia France Russia Slovenia Spain	3	Germany Russia Slovenia
EUR2 Qualifiers	29 August - 2 September 2018	(Italy) Bolzano	Austria Germany Great Britain Hungary Italy Netherlands	3	Germany Russia Slovenia
Total				8	

== Venues ==
Zatzman Sportsplex	Dalplex
The primary arena, used for most A-Division games and all championships games.	The secondary arena, located on the campus of Dalhousie University, primarily used for B-Division games.
Address: 110 Wyse Rd, Dartmouth, NS B3A 1M2	Address: 6260 South St, Halifax, NS B3H 4R2

== Tournament groups ==
Group C	Group D
Japan Poland Russia United States	Canada Germany New Zealand Slovenia

== Championship results ==
All times are local (UTC -3)

=== Preliminary round ===
==== Group C ====
Team	Pld	W	D	L	GF	GA	GD	Pts
Russia	3	3	0	0	23	16	+7	6
Poland	3	2	0	1	19	13	+6	4
United States	3	1	0	2	14	24	-10	2
Japan	3	0	0	3	14	17	-3	0

8 May 2019; 8:00	Russia	7 - 6 (1-1, 3-1, 3-4)	Japan	Dalplex, Halifax

8 May 2019; 14:00	Poland	10 - 3 (4-1, 4-1, 2-1)	United States	Dalplex, Halifax

9 May 2019; 8:00	United States	4 - 8 (1-1, 1-4, 2-3)	Russia	Dalplex, Halifax

9 May 2019; 11:00	Japan	2 - 3 (0-0, 1-1, 1-2)	Poland	Dalplex, Halifax

10 May 2019; 8:00	Poland	6 - 8 (2-4, 1-3, 3-1)	Russia	Dalplex, Halifax

10 May 2019; 14:00	United States	7 - 6 (2-3, 2-1, 3-2)	Japan	Zatzman Sportsplex, Dartmouth, NS

==== Group D ====
Team	Pld	W	D	L	GF	GA	GD	Pts
Germany	3	3	0	0	46	16	+30	6
Slovenia	3	2	0	1	31	17	+14	4
Canada	3	1	0	2	20	31	-11	2
New Zealand	3	0	0	3	4	37	-33	0

8 May 2019; 11:00	Slovenia	14 - 2 (4-0, 6-0, 4-2)	New Zealand	Dalplex, Halifax

8 May 2019; 17:00	Germany	19 - 9 (5-1, 6-3, 8,5)	Canada	Zatzman Sportsplex, Dartmouth, NS

9 May 2019; 14:00	New Zealand	1 - 16 (0-6, 1-5, 0-5)	Germany	Dalplex, Halifax

9 May 2019; 17:00	Canada	4 - 11 (1-2, 1-4, 2-5)	Slovenia	Zatzman Sportsplex, Dartmouth, NS

10 May 2019; 17:00	New Zealand	1 - 7 (0-3, 1-3, 0-1)	Canada	Zatzman Sportsplex, Dartmouth, NS

10 May 2019; 17:00	Slovenia	6 - 11 (1-4, 2-6, 3-1)	Germany	Dalplex, Halifax

=== Placement round ===
==== 15th place match ====
11 May 2019; 8:00	New Zealand	2 - 12 (0-2, 0-4, 2-6)	Japan	Dalplex, Halifax

==== 13th place match ====
11 May 2019; 17:00	United States	7 - 11 (3-3, 0-4, 4-4)	Canada	Zatzman Sportsplex, Dartmouth, NS

=== Playoff round ===
Semifinals
1	Germany	9
4	Poland	4
3	Slovenia	8
2	Russia	5

Finals
Germany	9
Slovenia	3

==== Semifinals ====
11 May 2019; 14:00	Germany	12 - 4 (2-0, 7-1, 3-3)	Poland	Dalplex, Halifax

11 May 2019; 11:00	Russia	5 - 8 (0-3, 3-3, 2-2)	Slovenia	Dalplex, Halifax

==== Bronze Medal match ====
12 May 2019; 7:00	Poland	6 - 9 (1-3, 3-1, 2-5)	Russia	Zatzman Sportsplex, Dartmouth, NS

==== Final ====
12 May 2019; 10:00	Germany	9 - 3 (3-1, 1-0, 5-2)	Slovenia	Zatzman Sportsplex, Dartmouth, NS

=== Final standings ===
Rk.	Team
1st place, gold medalist(s)	Germany
2nd place, silver medalist(s)	Slovenia
3rd place, bronze medalist(s)	Russia
4.	Poland
5.	Canada
6.	United States
7.	Japan
8.	New Zealand

Germany qualified for the A and B groups at the 2021 Men's U-19 World Floorball Championship.

== See also ==
- 2019 Men's U-19 World Floorball Championships
