= 2009 Men's U-19 World Floorball Championships =

Floorball competition

2009 Men's U19 World Floorball Championships
A-Division
- Official logo of the 2009 Men's under-19 World Floorball Championships

Tournament details
- Host country: Finland
- Venue: 1 (in 1 host city)
- Dates: May 6–10, 2009
- Teams: 8

Final positions
- Champions: Sweden

Tournament statistics
- Matches played: 18
- Goals scored: 216 (12 per match)
- Scoring leader(s): (Sweden) Henrik Stenberg (21 points)
- All statistics correct as of 04:40, July 28, 2009 (UTC).

The 2009 Men's U-19 World Floorball Championships were the fifth world championships in men's U-19 floorball. The tournament took place over May 6–10, 2009 in Turku, Finland.

Sweden defeated Finland 8–3 in the final match to win the men's under-19 world floorball championship for the 3rd consecutive year.

All matches took place at the Turkuhalli in Turku, Finland.

== Tournament information ==
=== Facts and history ===
The 2009 Men's U-19 World Floorball Championships were the first men's over-19 floorball championships that were held in the month of May, after the International Floorball Federation (IFF) changed their international tournament calendar format in 2008. Previously, the tournament was hosted in the months of either October or November.

Sweden came into the tournament as two-time defending champions, after having won the world championship in both 2005 and 2007. The Swedish team had also previously won a championship in 2001, but did not defend their title in 2003, as they would lose in the final to rivals, Finland. The Czech Republic, Finland, Sweden, and Switzerland remain the only teams to have captured a women's under-19 world floorball championship medal.

== Qualifying ==
2009 Men's U19 World Floorball Championships
Qualifying Round

Tournament details
- Host country: Hungary
- Venue: 1 (in 1 host city)
- Dates: September 10–14, 2008
- Teams: 6

Final positions
- Champions: Russia; Hungary

Tournament statistics
- Matches played: 15
- Goals scored: 204 (13.6 per match)
- All statistics correct as of 16:11, 14 September 2008 (UTC).

The 2009 Men's U-19 World Floorball Championships Qualifying rounds took place over September 10–14, 2008 in Kartal, Hungary.

The top 2 teams (Russia & Hungary) advanced to play in the B-Division at the 2009 Men's U-19 World Floorball Championships.

All matches took place at the Zsivóczky Gyula Sporthall.

=== Results ===
Team	Pld	W	D	L	GF	GA	GD	Pts
Russia	5	4	1	0	61	8	+53	9
Hungary	5	3	2	0	58	14	+44	8
Slovenia	5	2	2	1	33	15	+18	6
Spain	5	2	1	2	27	28	−1	5
Netherlands	5	1	0	4	19	36	−17	2
Georgia	5	0	0	5	6	103	−97	0

==== September 10, 2008 ====
September 10, 2008; 14.00	Russia	13:0 ( 6:0, 3:0, 4:0 )	Spain	Kartal, Hungary; Zsivóczky Gyula Sporthall

Alexey Lapko - 04.45; Vladimir Garevskikh - 07.11; Evgeny Bogdanyuk - 08.51; Evgeny Bogdanyuk - 12.14; Evgeny Bogdanyuk - 13.00; Vladimir Garevskikh - 14.03; Evgeny Bogdanyuk - 24.32; Dmitry Sherstnov - 32.34; Vladimir Garevskikh - 35.49; Ilya Veshnyakov - 42.59; Denis Krysolov - 49.56; Alexander Zernov - 53.19; Alexey Lapko - 59.05 / Goals

September 10, 2008; 16.45	Slovenia	5:2 ( 2:0, 3:0, 0:2 )	Netherlands	Kartal, Hungary; Zsivóczky Gyula Sporthall

Luka Casar - 14.29; Rok Korosec - 19.13; Luka Casar - 28.17; Luka Sturm - 29.00; Own goal - 37.33 / Goals / 56.52 - Niek Hovius; 58.27 - Jochem de Bruin

September 10, 2008; 19.30	Hungary	31:1 ( 12:0, 8:1, 11:0 )	Georgia	Kartal, Hungary; Zsivóczky Gyula Sporthall

Csaba Kollár - 03.22; Zoltán Németh - 03.29; Bence Darai - 04.21; Flórián Geri - 04.56; Bence Darai - 06.51; Philip Kapetz - 07.33; Péter Machlik - 07.46; Attila Dosa - 10.16; Norbert Ressely - 11.20; Dávid Nagy - 12.15; Norbert Duró - 14.49; Norbert Ressely - 18.06; Máté Darai - 27.00; Norbert Ressely - 30.06; Bence Darai - 30.51; Attila Dosa - 31.41; Zoltán Németh - 33.13; Zsolt Alm - 33.47; Norbert Ressely - 37.07; Máté Darai - 38.33; Norbert Ressely - 40.09; Philip Kapetz - 41.44; Bence Farsang - 43.02; Bence Darai - 44.02; Norbert Duró - 45.58; Philip Kapetz - 47.15; Norbert Ressely - 50.02; Péter Machlik - 54.38; Balázs André - 55.28; Zoltán Németh - 58.37; Máté Darai - 59.07 / Goals / 35.27 - Rati Gabadadze

==== September 11, 2008 ====
September 11, 2008; 14.00	Georgia	1:18 ( 0:6, 1:9, 0:3 )	Slovenia	Kartal, Hungary; Zsivóczky Gyula Sporthall

Giorgi Chikvaidze - 32.39 / Goals / 01.23 - David Kavcnik; 02.06 - Luka Casar; 09.03 - Luka Sturm; 11.38 - Rok Korosec; 18.04 - Luka Casar; 18.30 - Blaz Gorsek; 23.10 - Blaž Kavčič; 27.01 - Rok Korosec; 27.14 - Luka Casar; 29.07 - David Kavcnik; 29.29 - Luka Casar; 30.20 - Luka Casar; 34.08 - Anze Burnik; 36.50 - Rok Peternelj; 38.06 - Rok Korosec; 40.38 - David Kavcnik; 45.09 - Rok Korosec; 58.24 - Luka Sturm

September 11, 2008; 16.45	Netherlands	1:14 ( 0:5, 0:4, 1:5 )	Russia	Kartal, Hungary; Zsivóczky Gyula Sporthall

Mats van der Heide - 55.54 / Goals / 06.30 - Denis Krysolov; 06.45 - Alexey Lapko; 08.39 - Vladimir Garevskikh; 16.34 - Ilya Veshnyakov; 19.42 - Vladimir Garevskikh; 20.58 - Vladimir Garevskikh; 30.27 - Vladimir Garevskikh; 30.56 - Alexander Avtushenko; 39.36 - Alexey Lapko; 43.32 - Dmitry Sherstnov; 47.22 - Denis Krysolov; 55.01 - Vladimir Garevskikh; 57.35 - Evgeny Bogdanyuk; 59.59 - Ilya Veshnyakov

September 11, 2008; 19.30	Spain	3:10 ( 1:5, 1:2, 1:3 )	Hungary	Kartal, Hungary; Zsivóczky Gyula Sporthall

Pablo Reparaz - 14.16; Christian Fernandez - 27.39; Jaime Fernand - 55.14 / Goals / 02.17 - Attila Dosa; 03.29 - Norbert Ressely; 06.08 - Bence Darai; 11.29 - Norbert Ressely; 15.49 - Máté Darai; 27.17 - Bence Farsang; 31.46 - Máté Darai; 44.53 - Norbert Duró; 48.10 - Norbert Ressely; 58.40 - Balázs André

==== September 12, 2008 ====
September 12, 2008; 14.00	Russia	5:3 ( 3:2, 1:1, 1:0 )	Slovenia	Kartal, Hungary; Zsivóczky Gyula Sporthall

Alexander Avtushenko - 01.31; Denis Krysolov - 06.13; Vladimir Garevskikh - 11.56; Vladimir Garevskikh - 33.13; Denis Krysolov - 44.16 / Goals / 14.52 - Ales Molk; 19.24 - Anze Burnik; 20.45 - Luka Casar

September 12, 2008; 16.45	Spain	17:0 ( 4:0, 5:0, 8:0 )	Georgia	Kartal, Hungary; Zsivóczky Gyula Sporthall

Santiago Souto - 00.52; Andres Helfer - 03.50; Santiago Souto - 11.33; Rubén Garzón - 17.33; Andres Helfer - 20.49; Christian Fernandez - 27.30; Christian Fernandez - 33.38; Daniel Garcia - 35.36; Christian Fernandez - 37.43; Juan Otero - 45.35; Andres Helfer - 47.38; Carlos Cumplido - 47.53; Carlos Cumplido - 50.13; Santiago Souto - 51.02; Ernesto Garcia - 51.33; Daniel Garcia - 53.51; Ernesto Garcia - 57.44 / Goals

September 12, 2008; 19.30	Hungary	8:1 ( 3:0, 2:1, 3:0 )	Netherlands	Kartal, Hungary; Zsivóczky Gyula Sporthall

Máté Darai - 02.44; Attila Dosa - 10.16; Norbert Ressely - 16.57; Csaba Kollár - 27.28; Norbert Ressely - 28.28; Csaba Kollár - 43.12; Bence Darai - 51.46; Flórián Geri - 52.23 / Goals / 36.23 - Thomas van Rijsselt

==== September 13, 2008 ====
September 13, 2008; 11.45	Georgia	1:26 ( 0:12, 0:9, 1:5 )	Russia	Kartal, Hungary; Zsivóczky Gyula Sporthall

Giorgi Chikvaidze - 56.15 / Goals / 03.52 - Ilya Veshnyakov; 04.21 - Nikita Ilyukhin; 07.11 - Own goal 10.17 - Denis Krysolov; 12.39 - Sergei Danilov; 12.57 - Alexey Lapko; 13.10 - Denis Krysolov; 13.19 - Vladimir Garevskikh; 16.48 - Alexander Zernov; 18.19 - Vladimir Garevskikh; 18.36 - Vladimir Garevskikh; 19.06 - Dmitry Sherstnov; 21.27 - Alexey Kottsov; 25.16 - Ilya Veshnyakov; 25.34 - Evgeny Bogdanyuk; 26.25 - Evgeny Bogdanyuk; 27.12 - Denis Krysolov; 34.07 - Alexey Lapko; 35.33 - Evgeny Bogdanyuk; 37.04 - Dmitry Sherstnov; 39.43 - Alexey Lapko; 40.41 - Denis Krysolov; 43.13 - Alexander Mulko; 49.09 - Vladimir Garevskikh; 52.15 - Alexey Lapko; 59.33 - Denis Krysolov

September 13, 2008; 14.30	Netherlands	4:6 ( 2:3, 1:0, 1:3 )	Spain	Kartal, Hungary; Zsivóczky Gyula Sporthall

Kevin Rolleman - 11.30; Tiury Meijer - 19.05; Jochem de Bruin - 28.36; Thomas van Rijsselt - 46.03 / Goals / 06.27 - Christian Fernandez; 14.56 - Ernesto Garcia; 18.49 - Juan Otero; 43.44 - Israel Poves; 44.38 - Christian Fernandez; 57.40 - Pablo Lopez Reparaz

September 13, 2008; 17.15	Slovenia	6:6 ( 0:2, 3:1, 3:3 )	Hungary	Kartal, Hungary; Zsivóczky Gyula Sporthall

Rok Korosec - 24.19; Ales Molk - 26.45; Luka Casar - 37.13; Anze Burnik - 44.41; Ales Molk - 49.27; Rok Korosec - 58.22 / Goals / 07.10 - Péter Machlik; 08.02 - Bence Farsang; 31.02 - Máté Darai; 49.38 - Zoltán Németh; 52.25 - Flórián Geri; 59.27 - Péter Machlik

==== September 14, 2008 ====
September 14, 2008; 09.00	Spain	1:1 ( 0:0, 1:0, 0:1 )	Slovenia	Kartal, Hungary; Zsivóczky Gyula Sporthall

Pablo Reparaz - 24.12 / Goals / 47.13 - Luka Casar

September 14, 2008; 11.45	Netherlands	11:3 ( 2:3, 5:0, 4:0 )	Georgia	Kartal, Hungary; Zsivóczky Gyula Sporthall

Thomas van Rijsselt - 01.51; Jochem de Bruin - 13.27; Jelle Hubers - 20.29; Jeroen Bart - 21.43; Thomas van Rijsselt - 23.44; Thomas van Rijsselt - 28.10; Niek Hovius - 33.10; Jelle Hubers - 41.00; Jochem de Bruin - 45.37; Jochem de Bruin - 56.02; Jeroen Bart - 58.30 / Goals / 13.23 - Shota Giorkhelidze; 14.16 - Rati Gabadadze; 15.42 - Anatoli Asoev

September 14, 2008; 14.30	Russia	3:3 ( 0:3, 2:0, 1:0 )	Hungary	Kartal, Hungary; Zsivóczky Gyula Sporthall

Vladimir Garevskikh - 20.57; Ilya Veshnyakov - 24.35; Alexander Avtushenko - 52.25 / Goals / 04.44 - Norbert Ressely; 07.55 - Dániel Kiss; 19.54 - Péter Machlik

== Championship results ==
=== Preliminary round ===
==== Group A ====
Pos	Team	Pld	W	D	L	GF	GA	GD	Pts
1	Sweden	3	3	0	0	56	7	+49	6
2	Switzerland	3	2	0	1	24	15	+9	4
3	Latvia	3	1	0	2	8	25	−17	2
4	Denmark	3	0	0	3	5	46	−41	0

===== May 6, 2009 =====
May 6, 2009; 10.45	Switzerland	14–1 ( 5–0, 4–1, 5–0 )	Denmark	Turku, Finland; Turkuhalli

Sandro Cavelti – 03.24; Nino Wälti – 05.32; Philipp Fankhauser – 07.24; Olivier Hirschi – 18.23; Stefan Siegenthaler – 19.14; Nino Wälti – 25.17; Sandro Rindlisbacher – 27.09; Nino Wälti – 28.19; Reto Liechti – 32.47; Sandro Cavelti – 44.10; Marc Oliver Gerber – 46.58; Marc Oliver Gerber – 48.24; Gianluca Lutz – 52.14; Gianluca Lutz – 57.34 / Goals / 26.25 – Jonas Nielsen

May 6, 2009; 16.15	Latvia	1–17 ( 0–2, 0–10, 1–5 )	Sweden	Turku, Finland; Turkuhalli

Aivis Kusiņš – 40.23 / Goals / 11.14 – Henrik Stenberg; 17.25 – Emil Julkunen; 21.34 – Rickard Eriksson; 22.26 – Bobby Edberg; 24.46 – Henrik Stenberg; 33.41 – Kevin Lundgren; 33.56 – Rickard Hessmer; 36.41 – Rickard Hessmer; 37.14 – Bobby Edberg; 37.59 – Kevin Lundgren; 38.42 – Rickard Eriksson; 39.54 – Henrik Stenberg; 41.11 – Emil Julkunen; 44.39 – Niklas Winroth; 54.24 – Bobby Edberg; 54.49 – Henrik Stenberg; 56.31 – Bobby Edberg

===== May 7, 2009 =====
May 7, 2009; 10.45	Latvia	2–5 ( 2–3, 0–2, 0–0 )	Switzerland	Turku, Finland; Turkuhalli

Artis Savins – 05.58; Artis Savins – 11.06 / Goals / 07.59 – Sandro Cavelti; 11.51 – Nino Wälti; 18.13 – Sandro Rindlisbacher; 21.11 – Matthias Gloor; 22.00 – Christoph Meier

May 7, 2009; 16.15	Sweden	27–1 ( 8–0, 5–1, 14–0 )	Denmark	Turku, Finland; Turkuhalli

Rickard Hessmer – 00.32; Henrik Stenberg – 01.10; Niclas Eriksson – 04.15; Bobby Edberg – 05.40; Jonas Ågren – 08.23; Martin Ojaniemi – 09.28; Rickard Hessmer – 17.49; Henrik Stenberg – 19.52; Henrik Stenberg – 20.20; Rickard Hessmer – 25.24; Jimmie Pettersson – 29.23; Kevin Lundgren – 30.41; Rickard Hessmer – 34.12; Mattias Ljunggren – 43.31; Henrik Stenberg – 44.34; Martin Ojaniemi – 45.07; Jimmie Pettersson – 45.21; Henrik Stenberg – 48.07; Jonas Ågren – 48.47; Bobby Edberg – 49.37; Martin Ojaniemi – 49.58; Emil Julkunen – 50.55; Niclas Eriksson – 51.33; Bobby Edberg – 52.18; Daniel Thorsson – 53.42; Rickard Hessmer – 55.57; Wilmer Viinamäki – 59.21 / Goals / 24.54 – Nikolaj Jensen

===== May 8, 2009 =====
May 8, 2009; 10.45	Denmark	3–5 ( 2–1, 0–2, 1–2 )	Latvia	Turku, Finland; Turkuhalli

Nikolaj Parbo – 08.25; Nikolaj Parbo – 14.36; Jonas Nielsen – 45.34 / Goals / 09.25 – Atis Stepãns; 20.28 – Artis Savins; 32.49 – Aivis Kusiņš; 58.22 – Atis Stepãns; 59.56 – Atis Stepãns

May 8, 2009; 16.15	Sweden	12–5 ( 7–0, 1–5, 4–0 )	Switzerland	Turku, Finland; Turkuhalli

Mattias Ljunggren – 05.08; Henrik Stenberg – 06.52; Emil Julkunen – 07.43; Rickard Hessmer – 09.25; Victor Andersson – 11.57; Henrik Stenberg – 16.12; Rickard Hessmer – 19.13; Victor Andersson – 24.55; Henrik Stenberg – 42.31; Victor Andersson – 44.03; Wilmer Viinamäki – 49.44; Daniel Thorsson – 57.47 / Goals / 21.00 – Lukas Meister; 24.16 – Gianluca Lutz; 27.49 – Philipp Fankhauser; 30.25 – Gianluca Lutz; 39.12 – Sandro Cavelti

==== Group B ====
Pos	Team	Pld	W	D	L	GF	GA	GD	Pts
1	Finland	3	3	0	0	28	4	+24	6
2	Czech Republic	3	2	0	1	29	10	+19	4
3	Norway	3	1	0	2	7	30	−23	2
4	Slovakia	3	0	0	3	8	28	−20	0

===== May 6, 2009 =====
May 6, 2009; 13.30	Czech Republic	12–1 ( 2–0, 7–1, 3–0 )	Norway	Turku, Finland; Turkuhalli

Vlastimil Princ – 00.11; Own goal – 14.48; Jiří Juhaňák – 23.37; Petr Jankulár – 26.46; Miloš Tyl – 29.19; Miloš Tyl – 31.02; Martin Tokoš – 33.42; Martin Tokoš – 35.29; Adam Stegl – 39.58; Tom Ondrušek – 45.09; Tom Ondrušek – 52.54; Adam Stegl – 59.35 / Goals / 20.18 – Thomas Sola

May 6, 2009; 19.00	Finland	9–0 ( 2–0, 3–0, 4–0 )	Slovakia	Turku, Finland; Turkuhalli

Casper Pfitzner – 13.46; Casper Pfitzner – 19.12; Tomi Palin – 26.47; Eemeli Salin – 29.24; Eemeli Salin – 38.05; Casper Pfitzner – 40.28; Perttu Puska – 45.12; Onni Piiparinen – 47.12; Eemeli Salin – 50.52 / Goals

===== May 7, 2009 =====
May 7, 2009; 13.30	Slovakia	5–6 ( 2–1, 2–4, 1–1 )	Norway	Turku, Finland; Turkuhalli

Jakub Konecný – 07.52; Mário Seman – 10.31; Martin Baláz – 24.07; Lukás Rezanina – 36.17; Jakub Konecný – 59.24 / Goals / 06.16 – Jens Jorgensen; 20.28 – Jonas Pettersen; 32.02 – Anders Haugom; 36.39 – Kristian Stenrod; 39.05 – Martin Slåen; 45.09 – Jonas Pettersen

May 7, 2009; 19.00	Finland	6–4 ( 3–1, 2–1, 1–2 )	Czech Republic	Turku, Finland; Turkuhalli

Jesse Tolvanen – 05.22; Casper Pfitzner – 10.29; Casper Pfitzner – 13.02; Casper Pfitzner – 23.54; Perttu Puska – 36.41; Jesse Tolvanen – 45.51 / Goals / 07.40 – Jiří Juhaňák; 22.36 – Adam Stegl; 40.25 – Miloš Tyl; 49.35 – Adam Stegl

===== May 8, 2009 =====
May 8, 2009; 13.30	Slovakia	3–13 ( 0–3, 1–6, 2–4 )	Czech Republic	Turku, Finland; Turkuhalli

Lukás Rezanina – 27.14; Richard Seris – 58.05; Branislav Mitucha – 58.39 / Goals / 06.22 – Robin Žydel; 07.38 – Vít Hrubý; 16.25 – Robin Žydel; 22.46 – Roman Houbal; 23.47 – Radek Gwuzdz; 27.48 – Jiří Knotek; 29.29 – Martin Tokoš; 36.00 – Jakub Robenek; 38.03 – Martin Tokoš; 41.31 – Petr Jankulár; 49.00 – Miloš Tyl; 49.37 – Jakub Robenek; 55.20 – Martin Tokoš

May 8, 2009; 19.00	Norway	0–13 ( 0–2, 0–6, 0–5 )	Finland	Turku, Finland; Turkuhalli

Goals / 10.24 – Casper Pfitzner; 18.23 – Onni Piiparinen; 29.52 – Niklas Niiranen; 30.10 – Perttu Puska; 30.30 – Tomi Palin; 33.17 – Casper Pfitzner; 38.29 – Aleksi Viinikainen; 39.39 – Niko Jumppanen; 40.26 – Jiri Tikkanen; 40.51 – Onni Piiparinen; 46.10 – Jere Oksanen; 48.31 – Casper Pfitzner; 59.27 – Own goal

=== Playoffs ===
Semifinals
A1	Sweden	7
B2	Czech Republic	5
B1	Finland	3
A2	Switzerland	2

Finals
A1	Sweden	8
B1	Finland	3

==== Semi-finals ====
May 9, 2009; 16.00	Sweden	7–5 ( 2–1, 4–3, 1–1 )	Czech Republic	Turku, Finland; Turkuhalli

Mattias Ljunggren – 10.22; Henrik Stenberg – 12.45; Daniel Thorsson – 21.18; Victor Andersson – 25.16; Jimmie Pettersson – 33.43; Bobby Edberg – 35.57; Kevin Lundgren – 56.39 / Goals / 17.05 – Miloš Tyl; 24.42 – Miloš Tyl; 33.21 – Miloš Tyl; 34.51 – Vlastimil Princ; 43.22 – Vlastimil Princ

May 9, 2009; 19.00	Finland	3–2 (Penalty shots) ( 1–2, 0–0, 1–0, 0–0 )	Switzerland	Turku, Finland; Turkuhalli

Jere Oksanen – 16.50; Perttu Puska – 41.17 / Goals / 06.59 – Sandro Cavelti; 15.27 – Sandro Rindlisbacher

==== Bronze medal match ====
May 10, 2009; 14.00	Czech Republic	1–7 ( 0–1, 1–4, 0–2 )	Switzerland	Turku, Finland; Turkuhalli

Martin Tokoš – 31.15 / Goals / 14.01 – Niklaus Gassmann; 22.02 – Marc Oliver Gerber; 32.05 – Christoph Meier; 35.10 – Marc Oliver Gerber; 39.54 – Sandro Cavelti; 50.17 – Marc Oliver Gerber; 51.37 – Marc Oliver Gerber

==== World championship match ====
May 10, 2009; 17.00	Sweden	8–3 ( 2–2, 2–0, 4–1 )	Finland	Turku, Finland; Turkuhalli

Own goal – 06.39; Bobby Edberg – 14.42; Jonas Ågren – 22.27; Wilmer Viinamäki – 35.56; Niklas Winroth – 42.18; Henrik Stenberg – 47.16; Kevin Lundgren – 52.13; Kevin Lundgren – 59.38 / Goals / 05.22 – Ilari Talvitie; 08.03 – Casper Pfitzner; 58.40 – Jere Oksanen

=== Placement round ===
==== 7th place match ====
May 9, 2009; 10.00	Denmark	2–4 ( 0–3, 0–0, 2–1 )	Slovakia	Turku, Finland; Turkuhalli

Nicolai Pedersen – 54.37; Nikolaj Parbo – 58.09 / Goals / 03.20 – Jakub Konecný; 06.11 – Patrik Pelegrín; 18.27 – Simon Abík; 41.11 – Tomás Mader

==== 5th place match ====
May 9, 2009; 13.00	Latvia	6–4 ( 1–0, 2–2, 3–2 )	Norway	Turku, Finland; Turkuhalli

Oskars Balodis – 08.53; Jãnis Akmentiņš – 20.55; Gatis Akũlovs – 34.26; Ralfs Priedĩtis – 45.33; Toms Rĩsmanis – 48.37; Atis Stepãns – 58.22 / Goals / 22.47 – Anders Haugom; 35.30 – Thomas Pettersen; 53.57 – Than Tran Minh; 58.36 – Thomas Pettersen

== Leading scorers ==
Player		GP	G	A	PTS	PIM
(Sweden)	Henrik Stenberg	5	14	7	21	0
(Sweden)	Victor Andersson	5	4	9	13	4
(Sweden)	Bobby Edberg	5	9	3	12	0
(Sweden)	Kevin Lundgren	5	6	6	12	2
(Finland)	Casper Pfitzner	5	10	1	11	2
(Finland)	Jere Oksanen	5	3	8	11	0
(Sweden)	Rickard Hessmer	5	9	1	10	0
(Switzerland)	Marc Oliver Gerber	5	6	4	10	2
(Switzerland)	Sandro Cavelti	5	6	4	10	4
(Czech Republic)	Martin Tokoš	5	6	4	10	8

== Media All-Star Team ==
Country	Player	Position
(Switzerland)	Pascal Meier	Goaltender
(Finland)	Janne Karisto	Defenseman
(Czech Republic)	Adam Stegl	Defenseman
(Finland)	Casper Pfitzner	Left Wing
(Sweden)	Kevin Lundgren	Center
(Sweden)	Henrik Stenberg	Right Wing

== Ranking and statistics ==
2009 Men's under-19 World Floorball champions

Sweden
4th World title

Official 2009 A-Division Rankings according to the International Floorball Federation

Rk.	Team
1st place, gold medalist(s)	Sweden
2nd place, silver medalist(s)	Finland
3rd place, bronze medalist(s)	Switzerland
4.	Czech Republic
5.	Latvia
6.	Norway
7.	Slovakia
8.	Denmark

- Denmark is relegated to the B-Division at the 2011 Men's U-19 World Floorball Championships

== See also ==
- 2009 Men's U-19 World Floorball Championships B-Division

Men's under-19 World Floorball Championships
Preceded by Berne, Switzerland; 2007	Host City; Turku, Finland; 2009	Succeeded by TBA, Norway; 2011
