= 2021 Men's U-19 World Floorball Championships =

Floorball competition

Tournament details
- Host country: Czech Republic
- Dates: 25–29 August 2021
- Teams: 15

Final positions
- Champions: Czech Republic (2nd title)
- Runner-up: Finland
- Third place: Sweden
- Fourth place: Switzerland

Tournament statistics
- Matches played: 33

The 2021 Men's U-19 World Floorball Championships were the 11th world championships in men's under-19 floorball. The tournament took place from 25 to 29 August 2021 in Brno, Czech Republic.

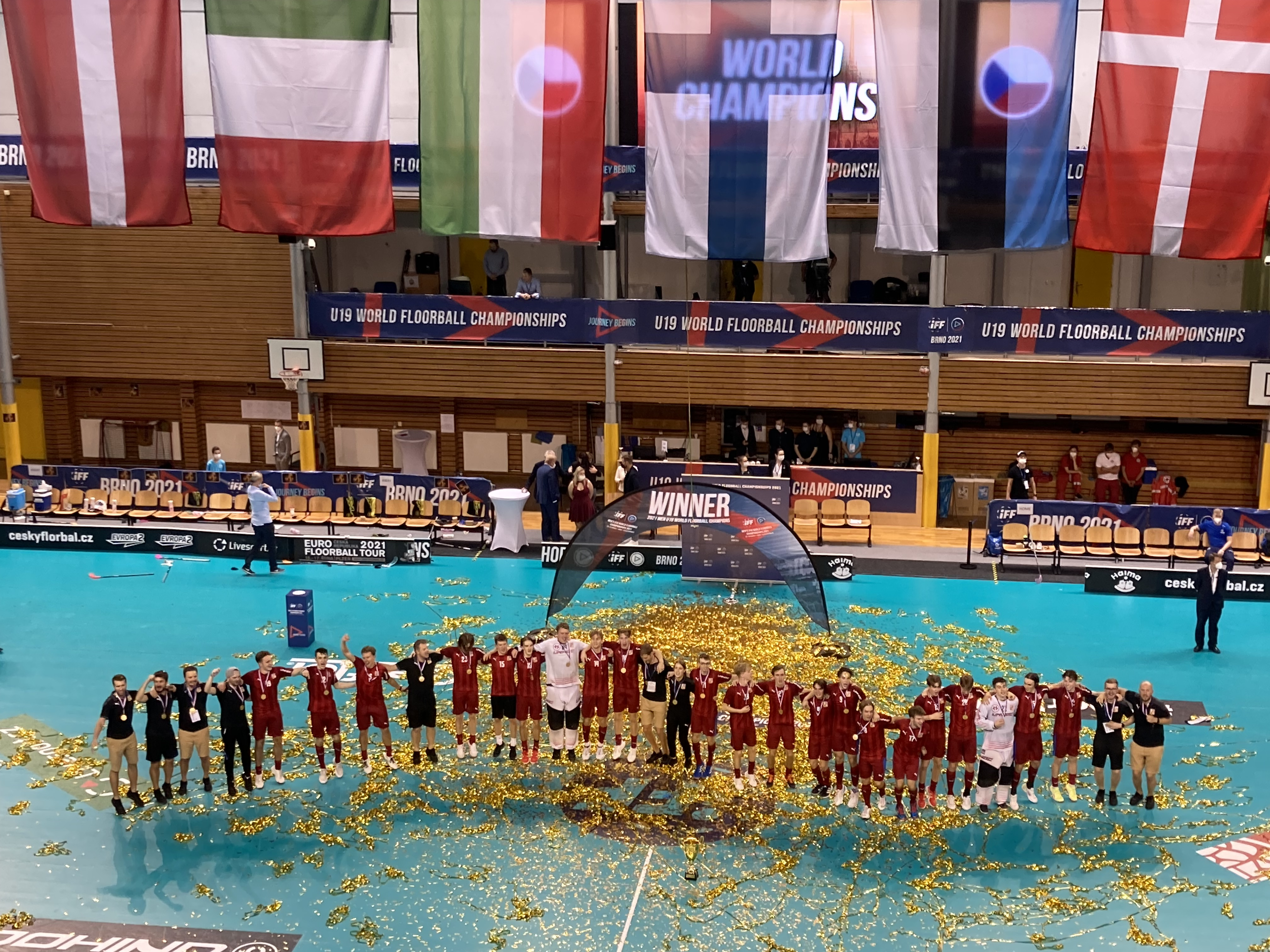
Czech team celebrating the title.

The Czech team, who had also won the championship in Halifax, defended their title.

== Qualification ==
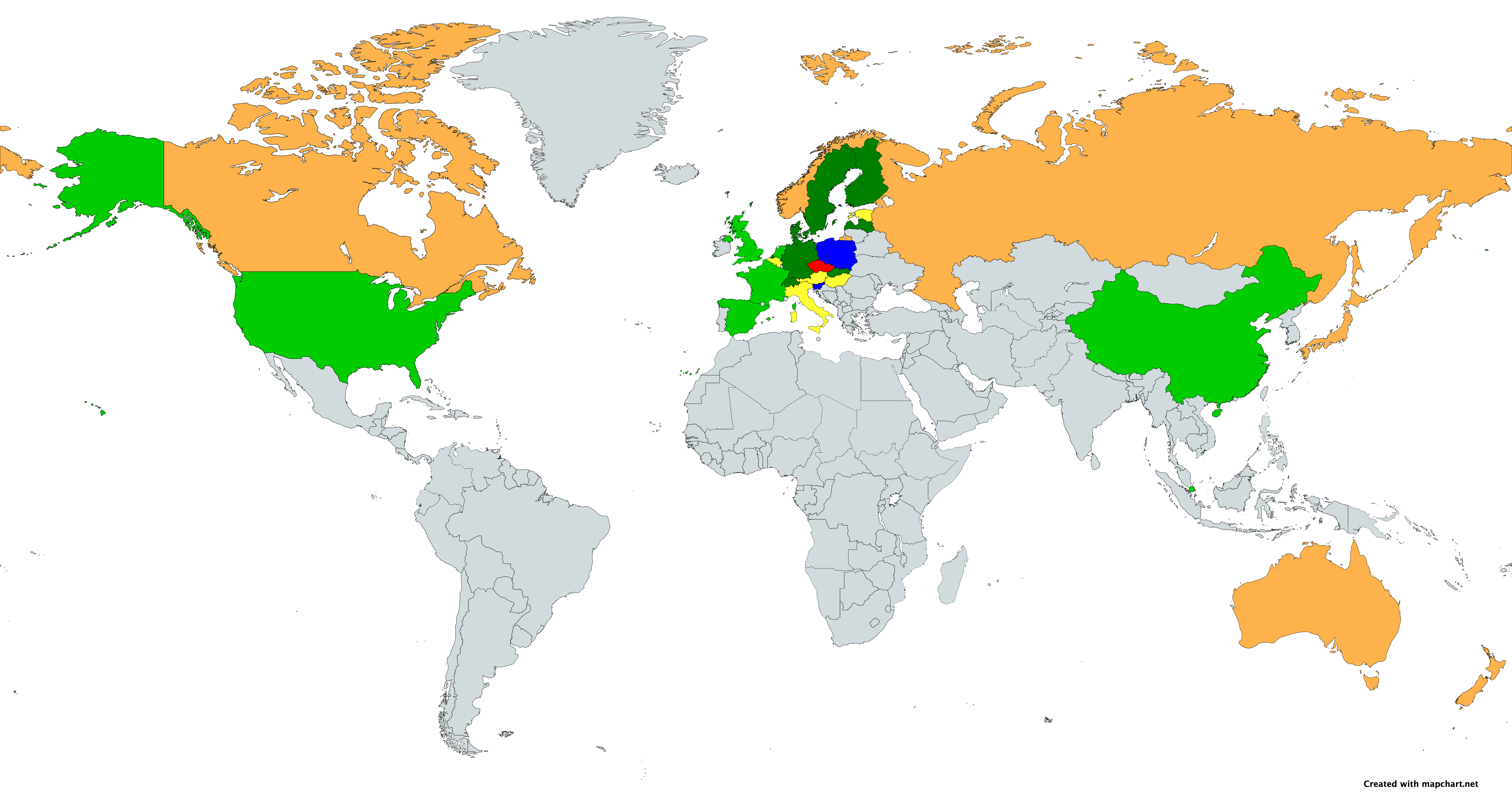
Host Directly qualified from the previous championships Qualified based on their rankings Not qualified or cancelled Qualified as replacement teams Qualified but forced to withdraw

A total of 28 teams registered for the event. The top 9 teams from the 2019 U-19 championship automatically qualified. The remaining teams automatically qualified based on World Rankings due to the cancellation of all qualifiers by the IFF due to the COVID-19 pandemic.

	Date	Venue	Teams	Vacancies	Qualified
Automatically Qualified				9	Czech Republic Sweden Finland Switzerland Latvia Slovakia Denmark Germany ~~Norway~~
Asia-Oceania Qualifiers (cancelled)	11–16 January 2021	Singapore	Japan New Zealand Australia Singapore China	3	~~Japan~~ ~~New Zealand~~ ~~Australia~~
European Qualification 1 (cancelled)	23–27 February 2021	(Italy) Lignano Sabbiadoro	Slovenia Estonia Hungary Belgium Italy Great Britain	3	Poland ~~Russia~~ Slovenia Austria Belgium Estonia Hungary Italy
European Qualification 2 (cancelled)	24–28 February 2021	(Poland) Łochów	Russia Poland Austria Netherlands Spain France	3	Poland ~~Russia~~ Slovenia Austria Belgium Estonia Hungary Italy
Americas Qualification (cancelled)	14–15 February 2021	(United States) Arlington	Canada United States	1	~~Canada~~

In July 2021, it was announced that Australia, Canada, Japan, New Zealand, Norway, and Russia would be unable to participate, and Austria, Belgium, Estonia, Hungary, and Italy would take their place as replacement teams.

== Venues ==
Brno
Arena Vodova

== Groups ==
The four groups were determined by a drawing on December 16, 2020. For the first time, all four groups will compete at the same division level.

Group A	Group B	Group C	Group D
Czech Republic	Sweden	Slovenia	Poland
Finland	Switzerland	Hungary	Austria
Latvia	Denmark	Estonia	Italy
Slovakia	Germany	Belgium	

== Preliminary round ==
=== Group A ===
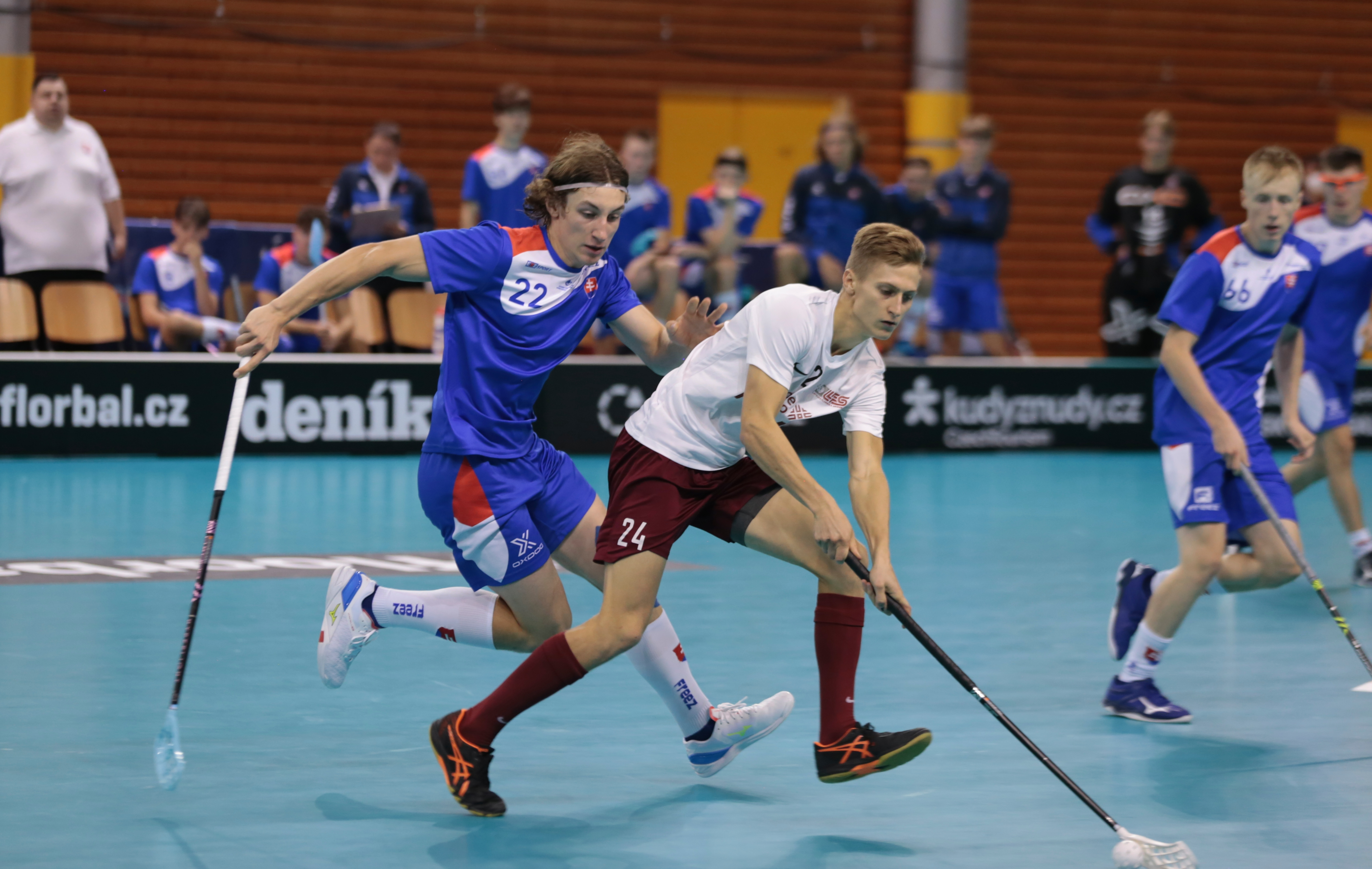
Slovakia – Latvia match

Pos	Team	Pld	W	D	L	GF	GA	GD	Pts	Qualification
1	Finland	3	3	0	0	33	12	+21	6	Semifinals
2	Czech Republic (H)	3	2	0	1	29	10	+19	4	Semifinals
3	Latvia	3	1	0	2	20	36	−16	2	Fifth place game
4	Slovakia	3	0	0	3	16	40	−24	0	7th–10th place game

Source: IFF
Rules for classification: 1) points; 2) head-to-head points; 3) head-to-head goal difference;
(H) Hosts

All times are local (UTC+2).

25 August 2021; 9:30	Slovakia	10–14 (3–4, 6–3, 1–7)	Latvia	Vodova Arena, Brno; Attendance: 304

Game reference

25 August 2021; 18:30	Czech Republic	4–6 (2–1, 2–2, 0–3)	Finland	Vodova Arena, Brno; Attendance: 1,272

Game reference

26 August 2021; 12:30	Finland	14–4 (2–1, 7–2, 5–1)	Latvia	Vodova Arena, Brno; Attendance: 343

Game reference

26 August 2021; 18:30	Czech Republic	13–2 (3–0, 5–1, 5–1)	Slovakia	Vodova Arena, Brno; Attendance: 1,068

Game reference

27 August 2021; 9:30	Finland	13–4 (3–3, 3–0, 7–1)	Slovakia	Vodova Arena, Brno; Attendance: 255

Game reference

27 August 2021; 15:30	Latvia	2–12 (1–4, 0–2, 1–6)	Czech Republic	Vodova Arena, Brno; Attendance: 603

Game reference

=== Group B ===
Pos	Team	Pld	W	D	L	GF	GA	GD	Pts	Qualification
1	Sweden	3	3	0	0	31	3	+28	6	Semifinals
2	Switzerland	3	2	0	1	23	10	+13	4	Semifinals
3	Germany	3	1	0	2	10	26	−16	2	Fifth place game
4	Denmark	3	0	0	3	6	31	−25	0	7th–10th place game

Source: IFF
Rules for classification: 1) points; 2) head-to-head points; 3) head-to-head goal difference;

All times are local (UTC+2).

25 August 2021; 12:30	Switzerland	13–2 (4–1, 8–1, 1–0)	Denmark	Vodova Arena, Brno; Attendance: 317

Game reference

25 August 2021; 15:30	Germany	2–13 (1–4, 1–5, 0–4)	Sweden	Vodova Arena, Brno; Attendance: 471

Game reference

26 August 2021; 9:30	Switzerland	9–1 (1–0, 3–1, 5–0)	Germany	Vodova Arena, Brno; Attendance: 279

Game reference

26 August 2021; 15:30	Sweden	11–0 (3–0, 6–0, 2–0)	Denmark	Vodova Arena, Brno; Attendance: 306

Game reference

27 August 2021; 12:15	Denmark	4–7 (2–1, 1–4, 1–2)	Germany	Vodova Arena, Brno; Attendance: 285

Game reference

27 August 2021; 18:30	Sweden	7–1 (1–0, 2–0, 4–1)	Switzerland	Vodova Arena, Brno; Attendance: 585

Game reference

=== Group C ===
Pos	Team	Pld	W	D	L	GF	GA	GD	Pts	Qualification
1	Estonia	3	2	1	0	19	9	+10	5	7th–10th place game
2	Slovenia	3	2	1	0	22	14	+8	5	Eleventh place game
3	Belgium	3	1	0	2	11	18	−7	2	13th–15th place game
4	Hungary	3	0	0	3	14	25	−11	0	13th–15th place game

Source: IFF
Rules for classification: 1) points; 2) head-to-head points; 3) head-to-head goal difference;

All times are local (UTC+2).

25 August 2021; 10:00	Belgium	2–6 (1–1, 0–3, 1–2)	Estonia	Vodova Arena, Brno; Attendance: 100

Game reference

25 August 2021; 16:00	Hungary	7–10 (2–5, 2–2, 3–3)	Slovenia	Vodova Arena, Brno; Attendance: 138

Game reference

26 August 2021; 13:00	Hungary	5–7 (1–1, 1–0, 3–6)	Belgium	Vodova Arena, Brno; Attendance: 103

Game reference

26 August 2021; 16:00	Slovenia	5–5 (0–2, 0–1, 5–2)	Estonia	Vodova Arena, Brno; Attendance: 146

Game reference

27 August 2021; 13:00	Slovenia	7–2 (3–0, 1–1, 3–1)	Belgium	Vodova Arena, Brno; Attendance: 124

Game reference

27 August 2021; 16:00	Estonia	8–2 (5–0, 1–1, 2–1)	Hungary	Vodova Arena, Brno; Attendance: 111

Game reference

=== Group D ===
Pos	Team	Pld	W	D	L	GF	GA	GD	Pts	Qualification
1	Poland	2	2	0	0	39	4	+35	4	7th–10th place game
2	Austria	2	1	0	1	9	13	−4	2	Eleventh place game
3	Italy	2	0	0	2	2	33	−31	0	13th–15th place game

Source: IFF
Rules for classification: 1) points; 2) head-to-head points; 3) head-to-head goal difference;

All times are local (UTC+2).

25 August 2021; 13:00	Italy	0–28 (0–7, 0–12, 0–9)	Poland	Vodova Arena, Brno; Attendance: 142

Game reference

26 August 2021; 10:00	Poland	11–4 (1–1, 5–0, 5–3)	Austria	Vodova Arena, Brno; Attendance: 151

Game reference

27 August 2021; 10:00	Austria	5–2 (1–0, 1–1, 3–1)	Italy	Vodova Arena, Brno; Attendance: 75

Game reference

== Placement round ==
=== Fifth place game ===
==== Latvia vs Germany ====
28 August 2021; 11:30	Latvia	8–1 (1–0, 4–1, 3–0)	Germany	Vodova Arena, Brno; Attendance: 310

Game reference

=== 7th–10th place game ===
Bracket

7th–10th place game
28 August
A4 Slovakia	13
C1 Estonia	0
28 August
B4 Denmark	3
D1 Poland	10

Seventh place game
29 August
W1 Slovakia	6
W2 Poland	4
Ninth place game
29 August
L1 Estonia	3
L2 Denmark	6

==== Slovakia vs Estonia ====
28 August 2021; 10:00	Slovakia	13–0 (3–0, 2–0, 8–0)	Estonia	Vodova Arena, Brno; Attendance: 92

Game reference

==== Denmark vs Poland ====
28 August 2021; 13:00	Denmark	3–10 (0–2, 0–2, 3–6)	Poland	Vodova Arena, Brno; Attendance: 129

Game reference

=== Seventh place game ===
==== Slovakia vs Poland ====
29 August 2021; 10:00	Slovakia	6–4 (4–2, 1–1, 1–1)	Poland	Vodova Arena, Brno; Attendance: 285

Game reference

=== Ninth place game ===
==== Estonia vs Denmark ====
29 August 2021; 12:30	Estonia	3–6 (0–3, 0–2, 3–1)	Denmark	Vodova Arena, Brno; Attendance: 43

Game reference

=== Eleventh place game ===
==== Austria vs Slovenia ====
28 August 2021; 19:00	Austria	6–7 ps. (5–0, 1–0, 0–6) (SD: 0–0) (PC: 2–3)	Slovenia	Vodova Arena, Brno; Attendance: 82

Game reference

=== 13th–15th place game ===
As the number of teams in Group C & D was not equal then a ‘mini-tournament’ format will be used to decide the 13th–15th placings. The placings will be calculated by using the two 13th–15th placement matches plus the result from the Group C match between the teams involved.

The matches for 13th–15th place will be played only with regular match time – 3 x 20 minutes. No extra time or penalty shots.

Pos	Team	Pld	W	D	L	GF	GA	GD	Pts	Result
1	Belgium	2	2	0	0	23	7	+16	4	Thirteenth place
2	Hungary	2	1	0	1	20	11	+9	2	Fourteenth place
3	Italy	2	0	0	2	6	31	−25	0	Fifteenth place

Source: IFF
Rules for classification: 1) points; 2) head-to-head points; 3) head-to-head goal difference;

26 August 2021; 13:00	Hungary	5–7 (1–1, 1–0, 3–6)	Belgium	Vodova Arena, Brno; Attendance: 103

Game reference

28 August 2021; 16:00	Italy	4–15 (1–4, 2–6, 1–5)	Hungary	Vodova Arena, Brno; Attendance: 78

Game reference

29 August 2021; 9:30	Belgium	16–2 (3–0, 6–1, 7–1)	Italy	Vodova Arena, Brno; Attendance: 44

Game reference

== Knock-out stage ==
=== Bracket ===
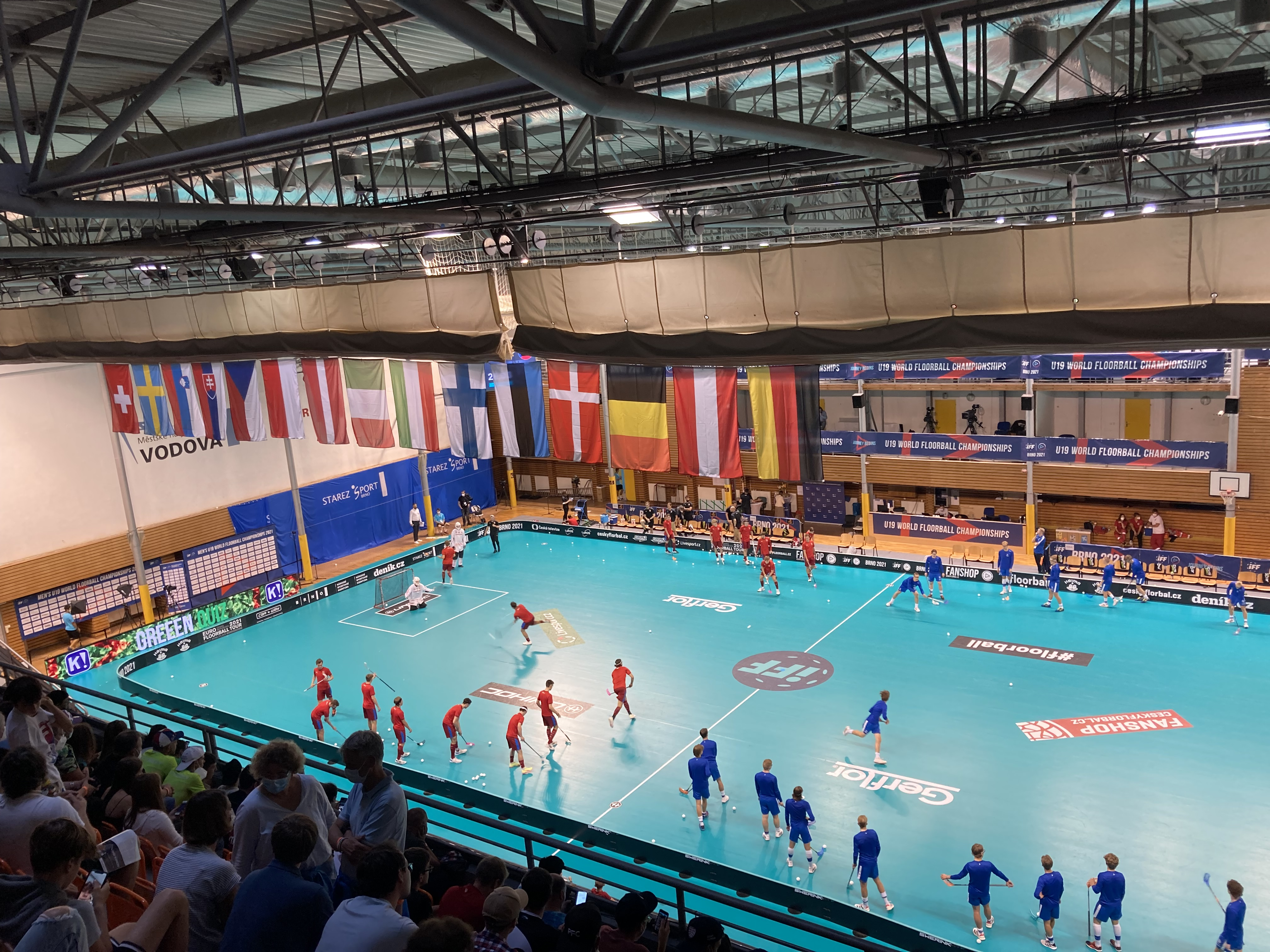
Before the final game Finland–Czech Republic

Semifinals
28 August
A1 Finland	3
B2 Switzerland	1
28 August
B1 Sweden	4
A2 Czech Republic	5ps.

Final
29 August
W1 Finland	3
W2 Czech Republic	4
Third place
29 August
L1 Switzerland	6
L2 Sweden	7

=== Semifinals ===
==== Sweden vs Czech Republic ====
28 August 2021; 14:30	Sweden	4–5 ps. (1–4, 1–0, 2–0) (SD: 0–0) (PS: 1–2)	Czech Republic	Vodova Arena, Brno; Attendance: 1,077

Game reference

==== Finland vs Switzerland ====
28 August 2021; 17:40	Finland	3–1 (1–0, 1–0, 1–1)	Switzerland	Vodova Arena, Brno; Attendance: 380

Game reference

=== Bronze medal game ===
29 August 2021; 14:00	Switzerland	6–7 (4–2, 2–2, 0–3)	Sweden	Vodova Arena, Brno; Attendance: 896

Game reference

=== Gold medal game ===
29 August 2021; 17:00	Finland	3–4 (2–0, 0–1, 1–3)	Czech Republic	Vodova Arena, Brno; Attendance: 2,261

Game reference

== Final standings ==
Gold medal	Czech Republic
Silver medal	Finland
Bronze medal	Sweden
4	Switzerland
5	Latvia
6	Germany
7	Slovakia
8	Poland
9	Denmark
10	Estonia
11	Slovenia
12	Austria
13	Belgium
14	Hungary
15	Italy
