= 2009 Men's U-19 World Floorball Championships B-Division =

Floorball competition

2009 Men's U19 World Floorball Championships
B-Division

Tournament details
- Host country: Finland
- Venues: 2 (in 2 host cities)
- Dates: 6–10 May 2009
- Teams: 8

Final positions
- Champions: Estonia
- Runners-up: Poland
- Third place: Germany

Tournament statistics
- Matches played: 18
- Goals scored: 276 (15.33 per match)
- Scoring leader(s): (Germany) Sebastian Bernieck (15 points)
- All statistics correct as of 19:16, 31 March 2009 (UTC).

The 2009 Men's U-19 World Floorball Championships were the fifth world championships in men's under-19 floorball. The tournament took place between 6 and 10 May 2009 in Raisio and Turku, Finland.

All matches except for the final were played in the Kerttulan Liikuntahalli in Raisio, Finland. The B-Division final took place in the Turkuhalli in Turku, Finland.

== Tournament information ==
=== Facts and history ===
The 2009 Men's U-19 World Floorball Championships are the first men's under-19 floorball championships that will be held in the month of May, after the International Floorball Federation (IFF) changed their international tournament calendar format last year. Previously, the tournament was hosted in the months of either October or November.

The tournament is also the first U-19 world floorball championships in which a North American team (Canada) will participate in. In addition to that, it is also the first in which qualifying was needed in order to determine the teams in the B-Division. Hungary and Russia qualified to play in the tournament after finishing in the top 2 during the 2009 Men's under-19 World Floorball Championships Qualifying, which took place in Kartal, Hungary from 10 to 14 September 2008.

=== News ===
- On 8 December 2008, the International Floorball Federation (IFF) and the 2009 men's U-19 world floorball championships organizing committee released the schedule for the tournament. The schedule was reviewed and subsequently released by the IFF Rules and Competition Committee (RACC).
- The International Floorball Federation (IFF) has yet to release any team rosters as of 1 April 2009.

== Preliminary round ==
=== Group C ===
Team	Pld	W	D	L	GF	GA	GD	Pts
Poland	3	2	1	0	44	18	+26	5
Hungary	3	2	1	0	39	14	+25	5
Austria	3	1	0	2	15	28	−13	2
Japan	3	0	0	3	5	43	−38	0

6 May 2009; 10:00	Japan	1–5 ( 0–2, 1–2, 0–1 )	Austria	Raisio, Finland; Kerttulan Liikuntahalli

Game reference

6 May 2009; 15:30	Hungary	9–9 ( 2–2, 4–4, 3–3 )	Poland	Raisio, Finland; Kerttulan Liikuntahalli

Game reference

7 May 2009; 10:00	Austria	7–14 ( 3–3, 0–4, 4–7 )	Poland	Raisio, Finland; Kerttulan Liikuntahalli

Game reference

7 May 2009; 15:30	Japan	2–17 ( 0–5, 1–3, 1–9 )	Hungary	Raisio, Finland; Kerttulan Liikuntahalli

Game reference

8 May 2009; 10:00	Poland	21–2 ( 5–1, 7–0, 9–1 )	Japan	Raisio, Finland; Kerttulan Liikuntahalli

Game reference

8 May 2009; 15:30	Austria	3–13 ( 2–3, 1–4, 0–6 )	Hungary	Raisio, Finland; Kerttulan Liikuntahalli

Game reference

=== Group D ===
Team	Pld	W	D	L	GF	GA	GD	Pts
Estonia	3	3	0	0	23	14	+9	6
Germany	3	1	1	1	17	16	+1	3
Russia	3	1	0	2	14	16	−2	2
Canada	3	0	1	2	14	22	−8	1

6 May 2009; 12:45	Canada	5–5 ( 1–2, 1–1, 3–2 )	Germany	Raisio, Finland; Kerttulan Liikuntahalli

Game reference

6 May 2009; 18:15	Russia	4–5 ( 3–1, 1–2, 0–2 )	Estonia	Raisio, Finland; Kerttulan Liikuntahalli

Game reference

7 May 2009; 12:45	Canada	3–4 ( 0–1, 1–1, 2–2 )	Russia	Raisio, Finland; Kerttulan Liikuntahalli

Game reference

7 May 2009; 18:15	Germany	4–5 ( 1–1, 2–1, 1–3 )	Estonia	Raisio, Finland; Kerttulan Liikuntahalli

Game reference

8 May 2009; 12:45	Estonia	13–6 ( 6–0, 3–0, 4–6 )	Canada	Raisio, Finland; Kerttulan Liikuntahalli

Game reference

8 May 2009; 18:15	Germany	8–6 ( 3–3, 4–2, 1–1 )	Russia	Raisio, Finland; Kerttulan Liikuntahalli

Game reference

== Placement round ==
=== 15th place match ===
9 May 2009; 10:00	Canada	16–2 ( 2–0, 10–0, 4–2 )	Japan	Raisio, Finland; Kerttulan Liikuntahalli

Game reference

=== 13th place match ===
9 May 2009; 19:00	Austria	2–18 ( 0–6, 1–6, 1–6 )	Russia	Raisio, Finland; Kerttulan Liikuntahalli

Game reference

== Playoffs ==
Division B Semi-finals
1C	Poland	9
2D	Germany	6
1D	Estonia	12
2C	Hungary	5

Division B Final
1C	Poland	6
1D	Estonia	8
11th – 12th place playoff
2D	Germany	15
2C	Hungary	6

=== Semi-finals ===
9 May 2009; 13:00	Poland	9–6 ( 3–1, 1–2, 5–3 )	Germany	Raisio, Finland; Kerttulan Liikuntahalli

Game reference

9 May 2009; 16:00	Estonia	12–5 ( 2–2, 4–0, 6–3 )	Hungary	Raisio, Finland; Kerttulan Liikuntahalli

Game reference

=== 11th place match ===
10 May 2009; 10:00	Germany	15–6 ( 3–3, 5–1, 7–2 )	Hungary	Raisio, Finland; Kerttulan Liikuntahalli

Game reference

=== B-Division final (9th place match) ===
10 May 2009; 11:00	Poland	6–8 ( 4–2, 1–3, 1–3 )	Estonia	Turku, Finland; Turkuhalli

Game reference

== Final standings ==
Rk.	Team
9th	Estonia
10th	Poland
11th	Germany
12th	Hungary
13th	Russia
14th	Austria
15th	Canada
16th	Japan

Estonia are promoted to the A-division for U19 WFC 2011.

== See also ==
- 2009 Men's U-19 World Floorball Championships
- 2009 Men's U-19 World Floorball Championships qualifying

Men's under-19 World Floorball Championships
Preceded by Berne, Switzerland; 2007	Host City; Turku, Finland; 2009	Succeeded by TBA, Norway; 2011
