= 2025 Men's U-19 World Floorball Championships =

Floorball competition

Tournament details
- Host country: Switzerland
- Venues: 3 (in 1 host city)
- Dates: 29 April – 4 May
- Teams: 16

Final positions
- Champions: Finland (5th title)
- Runners-up: Czech Republic
- Third place: Switzerland
- Fourth place: Sweden

Tournament statistics
- Matches played: 36

The 2025 Men's U-19 World Floorball Championships was the 13th edition of the championship. The tournament was played in Zurich, Switzerland, and took place from 29 April to 4 May. This was the second time that Switzerland hosted the junior championship, with the first time being in 2007.

Finland won the tournament by defeating the Czech Republic in the final during overtime. It was Finland's fifth title overall. Their last victory was in 2017. In the bronze medal game, Switzerland defeated the defending champions, Sweden, in a shootout. This was only the second time in history that Sweden finished without a medal.

The entire tournament drew a record attendance of 35,290 spectators, nearly double the previous high from the last championship. The final day, with 11,483 fans, likewise significantly surpassed the previous record set in 2013.

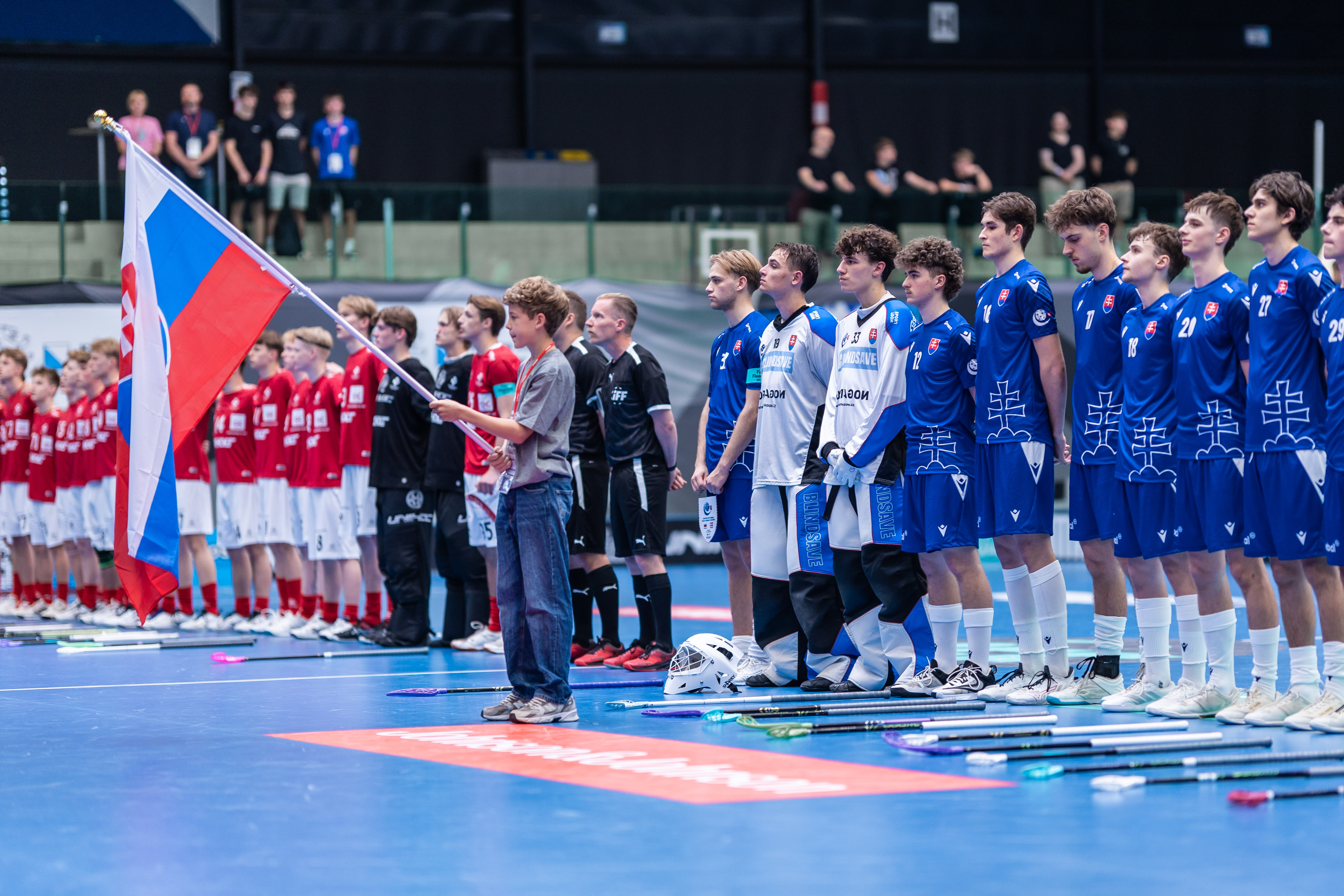
Team lineup before the Slovakia vs. Denmark match

== Bidding process ==
- Switzerland

Switzerland was the only country to bid and were given the hosting rights on 15 November 2022.

== Qualified teams ==
The final tournament featured 16 national teams. The top nine teams from the previous championship in 2023, including host nation and runner-up Switzerland, qualified directly. The remaining seven spots were determined through regional qualifiers. A record 26 teams registered for the tournament.

From the American qualifier, held from 2 to 4 August 2024, in Fredericton, Canada, the home team qualified for the first time after competing against the United States.

The first European qualifier took place from 4 to 8 September 2024, in Pruszcz, Poland. Out of five participating teams, Estonia and Spain qualified, with Spain making its debut. The second European qualifier was held from 29 January to 2 February 2025, in Latisana, Italy, alongside the 2025 Women's World Championships qualifier. Six teams competed, and two qualified, including the Netherlands, which advanced to the main tournament also for the first time.

The Asia-Oceania qualifier was held from 20 to 22 September 2024, in Honiara, the capital of the Solomon Islands. Two out of the four participating teams secured qualification.

Host nation Team qualified directly Team qualified Team failed to qualify Did not enter

	Date	Venue	Vacancies	Qualified
Automatically qualified from 2023		(Denmark) Frederikshavn	9	Sweden; Switzerland (H); Finland; Czech Republic; Latvia; Slovakia; Norway; Denmark; Germany
European qualifier 1	4–8 September 2024	(Poland) Pruszcz	2	Estonia; Spain
European qualifier 2	29 January–2 February 2025	(Italy) Latisana	2	Netherlands; Slovenia
Asian-Oceanian qualification	20–22 September 2024	(Solomon Islands) Honiara	2	Singapore; Australia
Americas qualification	2–4 August 2024	(Canada) Fredericton	1	Canada
Total			16	

== Venues ==
The three arenas are situated in Zurich. The final weekend matches took place in the Swiss Life Arena.

Zurich
Swiss Life Arena; Capacity: 12,000	Saalsporthalle; Capacity: 2,500	Sporthalle Hardau; Capacity: 1,300

Zurich in Switzerland

== Draw ==
The draw took place on 19 October 2024 in Zurich, Switzerland, at 17:30 CET. The 16 participating countries were divided into four groups (A, B, C, and D). Groups A and B were drawn from the top teams of the previous championship in 2023. Groups C and D were formed from the remaining teams, with some selections made blindly, as the second European qualifier had not yet taken place at the time of the draw.

Pot 1	Pot 2	Pot 3	Pot 4
Sweden (1); Switzerland (2); Finland (3); Czech Republic (4)	Latvia (5); Slovakia (6); Norway (7); Denmark (8)	Germany (9); Estonia (13); Australia (14); Singapore (15)	Netherlands (19); Spain (21); Canada (23); Slovenia (11)

== Referees ==
Eight referee pairs were selected on 20 February 2025.

Referees
Czech Republic	Tomáš Kostinek; Martin Reichelt
Czech Republic	Lukáš Čížek; Lukáš Laštovička
Finland	Joni Kokkonen; Tommi Virkki
Latvia	Mārtiņš Gross; Imants Vīnkalns
Slovakia	Tomáš Beňo; Roman Sklenica
Sweden	Frans Dahlstedt; Andreas Morelius
Switzerland	Janick Buehler; Yvan Buehler
Switzerland	Josef Fässler; Benjamin Schläpfer

== Tournament format ==
In the group stage, teams play in a round-robin format from 29 April to 1 May 2025. A win earns two points, while a draw earns one point. The knockout stage and placement matches took place from 2 to 4 May 2.

- The top two teams from Groups A and B advanced to the semi-finals of the championship play-offs.
- The third-placed teams from Groups A and B competed for fifth place.
- The fourth-placed teams from Groups A and B, along with the first-placed teams from Groups C and D, entered the semi-finals for placement matches deciding 7th to 10th place.
- The second-placed teams from Groups C and D played for 11th place.
- The third-placed teams from Groups C and D played for 13th place.
- The fourth-placed teams from Groups C and D played for 15th place.

== Preliminary round ==
=== Group A ===
Pos	Team	Pld	W	D	L	GF	GA	GD	Pts	Qualification
1	Czech Republic	3	3	0	0	30	6	+24	6	Semifinals
2	Finland	3	2	0	1	27	12	+15	4	Semifinals
3	Slovakia	3	1	0	2	12	24	−12	2	5th place game
4	Denmark	3	0	0	3	7	34	−27	0	7th–10th placement bracket

Source: IFF
Rules for classification: 1) points; 2) head-to-head points; 3) head-to-head goal difference;

29 April 2025; 10:00	Denmark	1–14 (0–3, 1–5, 0–6)	Czech Republic	Sporthalle Hardau, Zurich; Attendance: 819

Game reference

29 April 2025; 16:00	Finland	12–2 (1–1, 5–0, 6–1)	Slovakia	Saalsporthalle, Zurich; Attendance: 912

Game reference

30 April 2025; 16:00	Czech Republic	11–3 (5–1, 5–1, 1–1)	Slovakia	Sporthalle Hardau, Zurich; Attendance: 270

Game reference

30 April 2025; 19:00	Denmark	5–13 (2–4, 1–6, 2–3)	Finland	Saalsporthalle, Zurich; Attendance: 323

Game reference

1 May 2025; 16:00	Czech Republic	5–2 (1–2, 1–0, 3–0)	Finland	Saalsporthalle, Zurich; Attendance: 1,018

Game reference

1 May 2025; 16:00	Slovakia	7–1 (0–0, 3–0, 4–1)	Denmark	Sporthalle Hardau, Zurich; Attendance: 291

Game reference

=== Group B ===
Pos	Team	Pld	W	D	L	GF	GA	GD	Pts	Qualification
1	Sweden	3	2	1	0	19	13	+6	5	Semifinals
2	Switzerland	3	1	2	0	14	10	+4	4	Semifinals
3	Latvia	3	0	2	1	12	15	−3	2	5th place game
4	Norway	3	0	1	2	9	16	−7	1	7th–10th placement bracket

Source: IFF
Rules for classification: 1) points; 2) head-to-head points; 3) head-to-head goal difference;

29 April 2025; 19:00	Sweden	5–5 (2–2, 1–2, 2–1)	Switzerland	Saalsporthalle, Zurich; Attendance: 1,612

Game reference

29 April 2025; 19:00	Norway	4–4 (2–0, 0–1, 2–3)	Latvia	Sporthalle Hardau, Zurich; Attendance: 117

Game reference

30 April 2025; 16:00	Switzerland	5–1 (1–0, 2–0, 2–1)	Norway	Saalsporthalle, Zurich; Attendance: 987

Game reference

30 April 2025; 19:00	Latvia	4–7 (2–2, 0–3, 2–2)	Sweden	Sporthalle Hardau, Zurich; Attendance: 151

Game reference

1 May 2025; 13:00	Sweden	7–4 (5–0, 1–3, 1–1)	Norway	Saalsporthalle, Zurich; Attendance: 952

Game reference

1 May 2025; 19:00	Switzerland	4–4 (3–1, 0–2, 1–1)	Latvia	Saalsporthalle, Zurich; Attendance: 1.434

Game reference

=== Group C ===
Pos	Team	Pld	W	D	L	GF	GA	GD	Pts	Qualification
1	Germany	3	3	0	0	27	13	+14	6	7th–10th placement bracket
2	Netherlands	3	2	0	1	15	13	+2	4	11th place game
3	Singapore	3	1	0	2	12	20	−8	2	13th place game
4	Canada	3	0	0	3	13	21	−8	0	15th place game

Source: IFF
Rules for classification: 1) points; 2) head-to-head points; 3) head-to-head goal difference;

29 April 2025; 13:00	Netherlands	6–2 (0–0, 4–1, 2–1)	Singapore	Sporthalle Hardau, Zurich; Attendance: 736

Game reference

29 April 2025; 16:00	Canada	7–8 (3–2, 3–3, 1–3)	Germany	Sporthalle Hardau, Zurich; Attendance: 832

Game reference

30 April 2025; 10:00	Germany	9–4 (3–1, 1–2, 5–1)	Singapore	Saalsporthalle, Zurich; Attendance: 427

Game reference

30 April 2025; 13:00	Canada	1–7 (0–3, 0–2, 1–2)	Netherlands	Saalsporthalle, Zurich; Attendance: 512

Game reference

1 May 2025; 10:00	Singapore	6–5 (2–2, 1–3, 3–3)	Canada	Saalsporthalle, Zurich; Attendance: 568

Game reference

1 May 2025; 19:00	Germany	10–2 (0–2, 3–0, 7–0)	Netherlands	Sporthalle Hardau, Zurich; Attendance: 234

Game reference

=== Group D ===
Pos	Team	Pld	W	D	L	GF	GA	GD	Pts	Qualification
1	Australia	3	2	0	1	15	12	+3	4	7th–10th placement bracket
2	Slovenia	3	2	0	1	16	15	+1	4	11th place game
3	Spain	3	2	0	1	17	14	+3	4	13th place game
4	Estonia	3	0	0	3	10	17	−7	0	15th place game

Source: IFF
Rules for classification: 1) points; 2) head-to-head points; 3) head-to-head goal difference;

29 April 2025; 10:00	Australia	6–4 (0–0, 1–0, 5–4)	Estonia	Saalsporthalle, Zurich; Attendance: 702

Game reference

29 April 2025; 13:00	Slovenia	6–8 (2–2, 1–3, 3–3)	Spain	Saalsporthalle, Zurich; Attendance: 834

Game reference

30 April 2025; 10:00	Australia	3–5 (0–0, 1–2, 2–3)	Slovenia	Sporthalle Hardau, Zurich; Attendance: 687

Game reference

30 April 2025; 13:00	Estonia	2–6 (2–1, 0–2, 0–3)	Spain	Sporthalle Hardau, Zurich; Attendance: 613

Game reference

1 May 2025; 10:00	Estonia	4–5 (2–1, 1–1, 1–3)	Slovenia	Sporthalle Hardau, Zurich; Attendance: 584

Game reference

1 May 2025; 13:00	Spain	3–6 (1–0, 0–3, 2–3)	Australia	Sporthalle Hardau, Zurich; Attendance: 514

Game reference

== Placement round ==
=== 15th place game ===
15th place game
May 3
Canada	4
Estonia	6

==== Canada vs Estonia ====
3 May 2025; 10:00	Canada	4–6 (1–4, 2–0, 1–2)	Estonia	Sporthalle Hardau, Zurich; Attendance: 112

Game reference

=== 13th place game ===
13th place game
May 3
Singapore	4
Spain	8

==== Singapore vs Spain ====
3 May 2025; 13:00	Spain	8–4 (1–1, 3–2, 4–1)	Singapore	Sporthalle Hardau, Zurich; Attendance: 172

Game reference

=== 11th place game ===
11th place game
May 3
Netherlands	6
Slovenia	5

==== Netherlands vs Slovenia ====
3 May 2025; 16:00	Netherlands	6–5 OT (3–1, 0–1, 2–3) (OT: 1–0)	Slovenia	Sporthalle Hardau, Zurich; Attendance: 205

Game reference

=== Bracket ===
7th–10th semifinals
May 2
Denmark	12
Australia	3
May 2
Norway	10
Germany	3

7th place
May 4
Denmark	5
Norway	8
9th place
May 4
Australia	5
Germany	10

==== Denmark vs Australia ====
2 May 2025; 16:00	Denmark	12–3 (7–0, 3–2, 2–1)	Australia	Sporthalle Hardau, Zurich; Attendance: 198

Game reference

==== Norway vs Germany ====
2 May 2025; 19:00	Norway	10–3 (3–0, 2–3, 5–0)	Germany	Sporthalle Hardau, Zurich; Attendance: 315

Game reference

=== 9th place game ===
==== Australia vs Germany ====
4 May 2025; 10:00	Australia	5–10 (3–5, 0–0, 2–5)	Germany	Swiss Life Arena, Zurich; Attendance: 853

Game reference

=== 7th place game ===
==== Denmark vs Norway ====
4 May 2025; 10:00	Denmark	5–8 (3–3, 2–3, 0–2)	Norway	Sporthalle Hardau, Zurich; Attendance: 146

Game reference

=== 5th place game ===
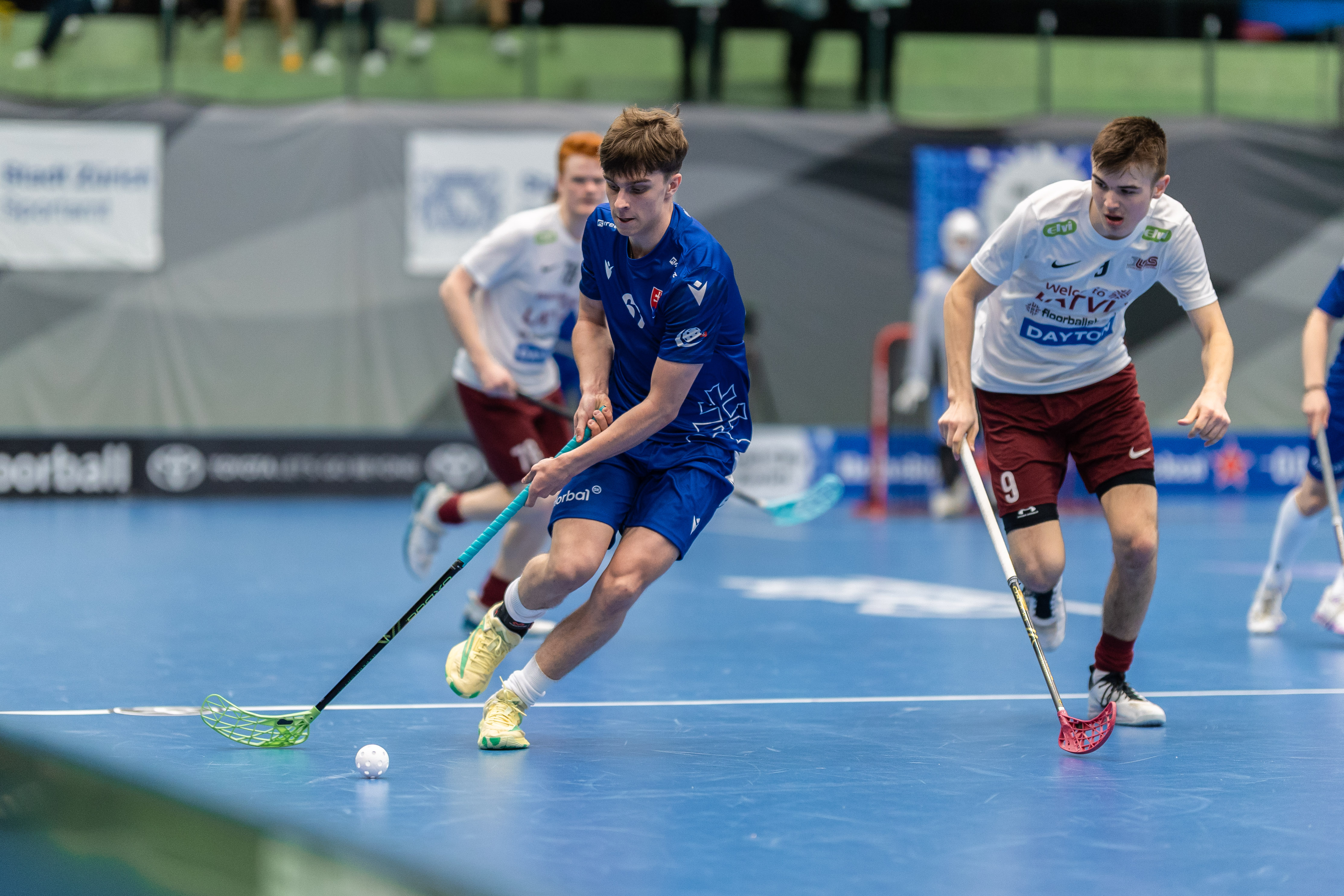
5th place game Slovakia vs. Latvia

5th place game
May 3
Slovakia	4
Latvia	2

==== Slovakia vs Latvia ====
3 May 2025; 19:00	Slovakia	4–2 (3–1, 0–1, 1–0)	Latvia	Sporthalle Hardau, Zurich; Attendance: 151

Game reference

== Knockout stage ==
=== Bracket ===
Semifinals
3 May
Sweden	3
Finland	9
3 May
Czech Republic	8
Switzerland	2

Final
4 May
Finland	4
Czech Republic	3
Third place
4 May
Sweden	3
Switzerland	4

=== Semifinals ===
==== Czech Republic vs Switzerland ====
3 May 2025; 16:00	Czech Republic	8–2 (4–0, 2–0, 2–2)	Switzerland	Swiss Life Arena, Zurich; Attendance: 3473

Game reference

==== Sweden vs Finland ====
3 May 2025; 19:00	Sweden	3–9 (2–5, 0–2, 1–2)	Finland	Swiss Life Arena, Zurich; Attendance: 3052

Game reference

=== Bronze medal game ===
4 May 2025; 13:00	Sweden	3–4 SO (1–2, 1–1, 1–0, 0–0); SO: 2–1	Switzerland	Swiss Life Arena, Zurich; Attendance: 5163

Game reference

=== Gold medal game ===
4 May 2025; 16:10	Finland	4–3 OT (1–1, 2–0, 0–2) (OT: 1–0)	Czech Republic	Swiss Life Arena, Zurich; Attendance: 5321

Game reference

== Final standings ==
Gold medal	Finland
Silver medal	Czech Republic
Bronze medal	Switzerland
4	Sweden
5	Slovakia
6	Latvia
7	Norway
8	Denmark
9	Germany
10	Australia
11	Netherlands
12	Slovenia
13	Spain
14	Singapore
15	Estonia
16	Canada

== Awards ==
=== Team of the tournament ===
- (Switzerland) Aapo Seppälä (Goalkeeper)
- (Finland) Ilmo Leino (Defender)
- (Czech Republic) Michael Wertheim (Defender)
- (Czech Republic) Mikeš Motejzík (Centre)
- (Finland) Aatu Knuuti (Forward)
- (Switzerland) Matteo Gervassoni (Forward)

== Marketing ==
=== Logo ===
The logo was intentionally similar to the 2022 Men's World Floorball Championships due to the local organisers thinking the 2022 logo has positive connotations.

This event is the first in a proposed plan by the Swiss to hold many floorball tournaments in Switzerland between 2025 and 2032.

=== Tickets ===
Pre sales for tickets were planned to start on 19 October 2024. Tickets packages include: venues packages for either one or both group stage venues, week long passes and tickets for the final weekend.

== 3v3 World Championship ==
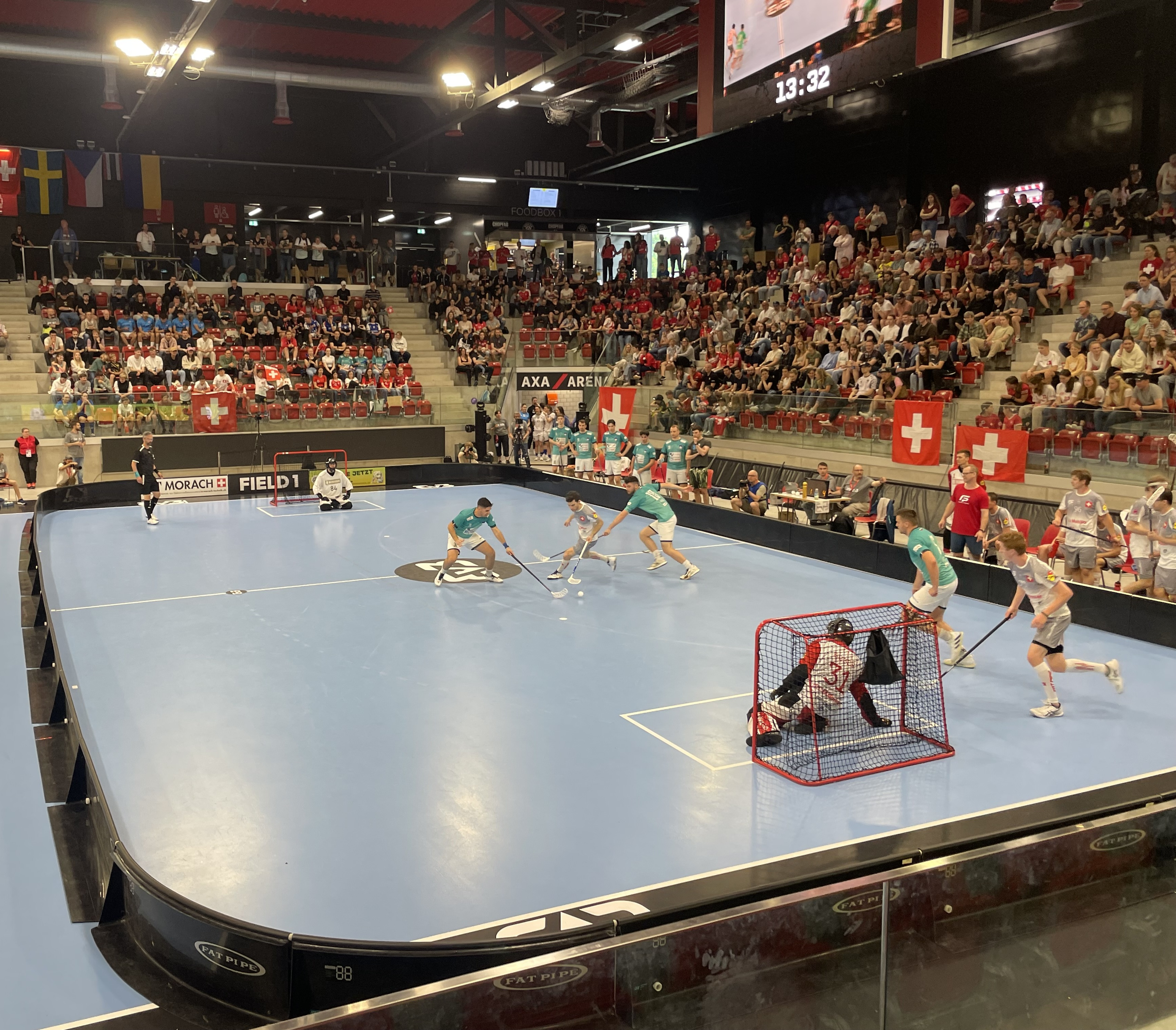
Semifinal match Switzerland vs. Slovenia

The event also featured the second 3v3 World Floorball Championships for both men's and women's teams. The competition took place during the end of the main tournament on 2–3 May 2025. Unlike the first edition, each country had only one team.

The men's tournament featured 23 teams from 17 European countries, as well as Hong Kong, Canada, Colombia, New Zealand, the United States, and Thailand. The host Swiss team won the tournament by defeating Ukraine in the final.

The women's tournament included 18 teams from 16 European countries, along with teams from Hong Kong and Canada. The host team also won the tournament by defeating Finland in the final.

Starting with the following 3v3 championship in 2026, the tournament was no longer held as part of the junior championship, but rather as a standalone event.
