= Germany men's national under-19 floorball team =

National sports team

Germany Men's U-19 National Floorball Team
- Founded: 2001
- Coach: (Finland) Tomi Rastas
- IFF Ranking: 9th (2025)
- First game: Germany 1–4 Estonia (6 November 2001)
- Largest win: Germany 21–1 Italy (1 September 2018)
- Largest defeat: Germany 0–22 Czech Republic (13 September 2009)

The Germany Men's Under-19 National Floorball Team is the men's under-19 national floorball team of the Germany, and a member of the International Floorball Federation. The team is composed of the best German floorball players under the age of 19. The German under-19 men's team is currently ranked 9th in the world at floorball after 2025 World Floorball Championships.

== All-time world championships results ==
Year	Position	GP	W	D	L	GF	GA	+/-
(Germany) 2001	11th	5	1	0	4	12	36	–24
(Czech Republic) 2003	In B Division							
(Latvia) 2005	In B Division							
(Switzerland) 2007	In B Division							
(Finland) 2009	In B Division							
(Germany) 2011	In B Division							
(Germany) 2013	In B Division							
(Sweden) 2015	In B Division							
(Sweden) 2017	In B Division							
(Canada) 2019	In B Division							
(Czech Republic) 2021	6th	4	1	0	3	11	34	–23
(Denmark) 2023	9th	5	1	1	3	26	37	–11
(Switzerland) 2023	9th							
Total:		14	3	1	10	49	107	–58

== Roster ==
The current roster can be found on the pages of the IFF.

=== Head-to-Head International Records ===
Opponent	GP	W	D	L	GF	GA	+/-
Denmark	19	3	3	13	77	106	-29
Poland	18	8	0	10	104	115	-11
Hungary	13	11	1	1	98	50	+48
Czech Republic	8	0	0	8	16	123	-107
Estonia	7	4	1	2	48	32	+16
Norway	6	3	1	2	39	35	+4
Netherlands	5	4	1	0	47	10	+37
Canada	4	2	1	1	36	27	+9
Switzerland	4	0	0	4	9	43	-34
Australia	3	2	0	1	26	7	+19
Japan	3	3	0	0	30	3	+27
Slovakia	3	1	0	2	11	21	-10
Slovenia	3	3	0	0	28	10	+18
Austria	2	2	0	0	16	5	+11
Italy	2	2	0	0	35	4	+31
Spain	2	2	0	0	28	5	+23
Finland	1	0	0	1	0	16	-16
Great Britain	1	1	0	0	19	0	+19
Latvia	1	0	0	1	3	4	-1
New Zealand	1	1	0	0	16	1	+15
Russia	1	1	0	0	8	6	+2
United States	1	1	0	0	18	4	+14
Totals	107	54	7	46	707	622	+85
