= Hungary men's national under-19 floorball team =

Youth floorball team representing Hungary

Hungary Men's U-19 National Floorball Team
- Founded: 2001
- Coach: (Hungary) Tamás Csordás
- IFF Ranking: 17th (2023)
- First game: (Hungary) 0 – 8 (Russia); November 6, 2001
- Largest win: (Hungary) 31 – 1 (Georgia (country)); September 10, 2008
- Largest defeat: (Switzerland) 21 – 1 (Hungary); April 24, 2011

The Hungary Men's Under-19 National Floorball Team is the men's under-19 national floorball team of Hungary, and a member of the International Floorball Federation. The team is composed of the best Hungarian floorball players under the age of 19.

The team participated in two Under-19 World Championships in the top division, in 2001 in Germany and in 2021 in the Czech Republic, finishing in 12th and 14th place, respectively.

The Hungarian under-19 men's team was ranked 17th in the world at floorball in 2023.

== Records ==
=== All-Time World Championship Records ===
Year	GP	W	D	L	GF	GA	+/-	Result
Germany 2001	5	0	0	5	6	36	-30	12th
Czech Republic 2003	4	0	1	3	12	36	-24	14th
Latvia 2005	4	1	0	3	16	33	-17	14th
Slovakia EUR Qualifiers 2007	3	0	0	3	12	23	-11	DNQ
Hungary EUR Qualifiers 2008	5	3	2	0	58	14	+44	Qualified
Finland 2009	5	2	1	2	50	41	+9	12th
Germany 2011	5	3	0	2	34	29	+5	10th
Germany 2013	5	2	0	3	47	32	+15	12th
Spain EUR Qualifiers 2014	4	4	0	0	51	8	+43	Qualified
Sweden 2015	5	2	2	1	32	24	+8	1th
Italy EUR Qualifiers 2016	4	4	0	0	38	9	+29	Qualified
Sweden 2017	4	2	0	2	24	22	+2	13th
Italy EUR2 Qualifiers 2018	5	3	1	1	17	8	+9	DNQ
Czech Republic 2021	5	1	0	4				14th
Total	63	27	7	29	397	315	+82	

=== Head-to-Head International Records ===
Opponent	GP	W	D	L	GF	GA	+/-
Germany	13	1	1	11	50	98	-48
Poland	6	2	1	3	37	55	-18
Netherlands	5	3	1	1	42	18	+24
Russia	5	1	1	3	13	29	-16
Austria	4	4	0	0	25	6	+19
Denmark	4	0	1	3	20	32	-12
Estonia	4	1	0	3	22	32	-10
Slovakia	4	0	0	4	10	24	-14
Switzerland	4	0	0	4	6	64	-58
Australia	3	2	0	1	23	12	+11
Czech Republic	3	0	0	3	12	56	-44
Slovenia	3	1	1	1	23	22	+1
Canada	2	1	1	0	16	14	+2
Georgia	2	1	1	0	35	5	+30
Great Britain	2	2	0	0	26	1	+25
Italy	2	2	0	0	16	4	+12
Japan	2	2	0	0	32	5	+27
Norway	2	0	0	2	6	27	-21
United States	2	2	0	0	22	4	+18
Belarus	1	1	0	0	14	2	+12
Belgium	1	1	0	0	7	5	+2
Singapore	1	0	0	1	6	7	-1
Spain	1	1	0	0	10	3	+7
Totals	76	28	8	40	473	525	-52

== See also ==
- 3 Nations Floorball League
