= Sportovní hala Vodova =

Sports venue in Brno, Czech Republic

STAREZ ARÉNA Vodova
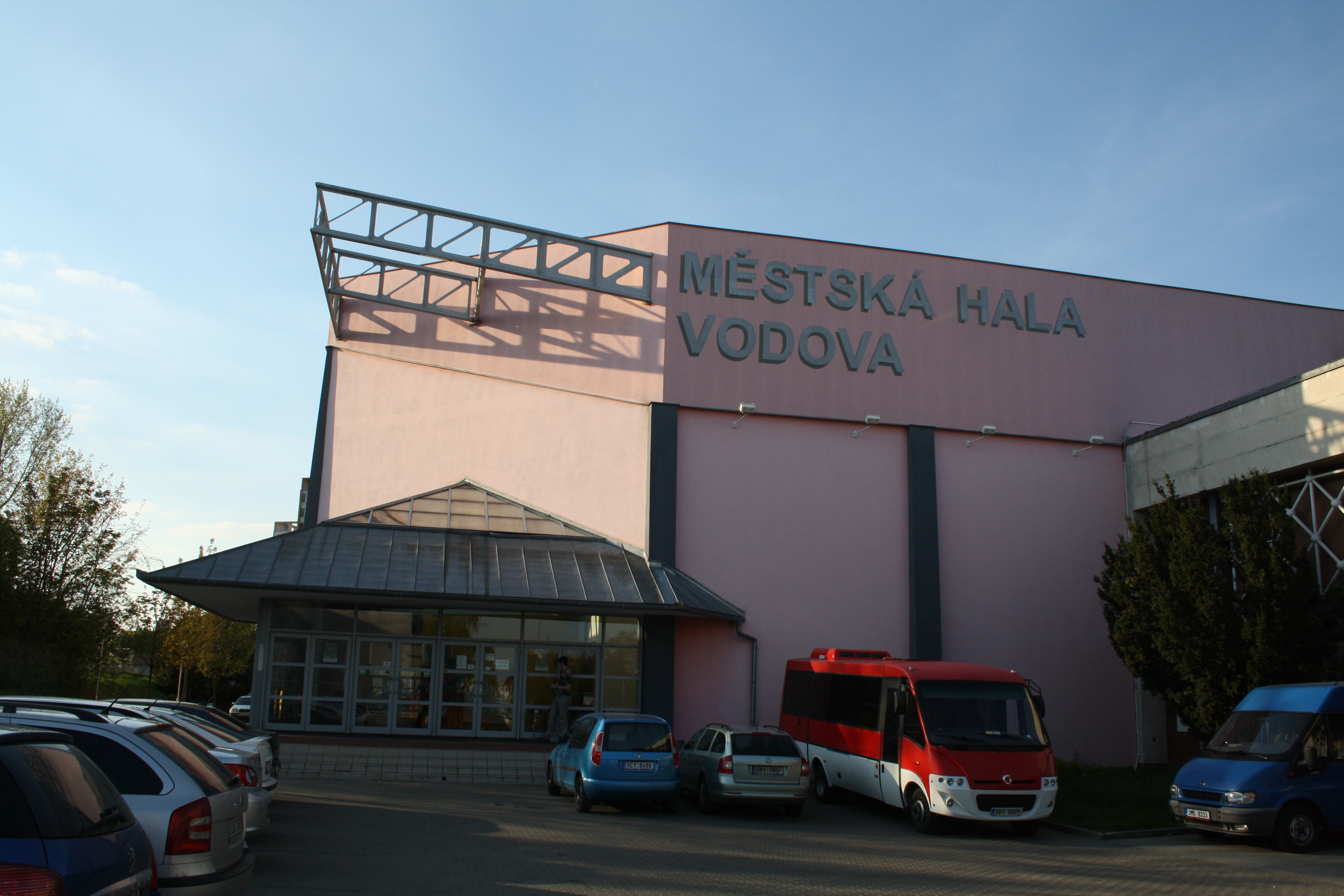
- City gym Vodova sideview
- Interactive map of STAREZ ARÉNA Vodova
- Full name: STAREZ ARÉNA Vodova
- Location: Vodova 108, Brno, Czech Republic, 612 00
- Coordinates: 49°13′39.415″N 16°35′2.14″E
- Capacity: 2,900

Construction
- Opened: 1975
- Expanded: 2001

Tenant
- Bulldogs Brno (1993–)

STAREZ ARÉNA Vodova is an indoor sporting arena located in Brno, Czech Republic. The capacity of the arena is 2,900 spectators. It hosts indoor sporting events such as basketball, volleyball, floorball, and boxing. An old hall is built next to this hall with a capacity of 1,000.

The venue hosted some matches of the 2010 FIBA World Championship for Women, complete 2021 Men's U-19 World Floorball Championships and will host some matches of 2025 Women's World Floorball Championships.
