= Zoltán Németh =

Hungarian teacher and politician

Member of the National Assembly
- In office 14 May 2010 – 5 May 2014

Personal details
- Born: 5 May 1972 (age 53) Budapest, Hungary
- Party: Fidesz
- Profession: teacher, politician

Zoltán Németh (born 5 May 1972) is a Hungarian teacher and politician, member of the National Assembly (MP) for Budafok-Tétény (Budapest Constituency XXXII) between 2010 and 2014.

He became a member of the Committee on Youth, Social, Family, and Housing affairs on 11 February 2013. Németh served as the leader of the Fidesz group in the General Assembly of Budapest since the 2010 local elections.
