= Canada men's national under-19 floorball team =

Canada Men's U-19 Floorball Team
- Nickname(s): Team Canada
- Founded: 2001
- Manager: Jennifer McKay
- Coach: Matthew Smith
- IFF Ranking: 16th (2025)
- First game: (Canada) 5-5 (Germany); 6 May 2009
- Largest win: (Canada) 16-2 (Japan); 9 May 2009
- Largest defeat: (Canada) 2-21 (Switzerland); 5 May 2019
Home colors	Away colors

The Canada men's national under-19 floorball team is the men's national under-19 floorball team of Canada, and a member of the International Floorball Federation (IFF). Canada's men's under-19 team recently participated at the Under-19 World Floorball Championships in Zurich after qualifying against the United States. Their 13th-place ranking after the 2019 Men's U-19 World Floorball Championships B-Division ties the highest ranking achieved by the men's under-19 team at the World Championships.

Canada's main rivals in floorball are the United States.

The Canada National Team is organized by Floorball Canada.

== Roster ==
As of the 2025 Men's U-19 World Floorball Championships

Goalkeepers
Number	Player name	Club
11	Julien Huther	(Switzerland) UHC La Chaux-de-Fonds
44	Fabian Walther	(Switzerland) UHC Sarganserland

Defensemen
Number	Player name	Club
14	Reed Hunsberger	(Canada) Ottawa Blizzard
17	Ty Shreve	(Canada) Truro Tsunami FC
21	Andrew Lankester	(Canada) Ottawa Blizzard
27	Ryan Tam	(Canada) Truro Tsunami FC
55	Ian Chambers	(Canada) Toronto FC
83	Tate Thiessen	(Canada) Ottawa Blizzard
97	Samson McDonald	(Canada) Ottawa Blizzard

Forwards
Number	Player name	Club
8	Tommy MacQueen	(Canada) Halifax Hydra FC
10	Alexander Field	(Canada) Truro Tsunami FC
12	Nate Betts	(Canada) Wolfville Golden Knights
13	Drew Williams	(Canada) Truro Tsunami FC
22	Nathan Nadeau	(Canada) Ottawa Blizzard
23	Ethan Wolfe	(Canada) Truro Tsunami FC
47	Ian Blomqvist	(Sweden) Lindome IBK
67	Clement Huther	(Switzerland) Floorball Koniz Bern
70	Dylan Svoboda	(Switzerland) GC Unihockey
87	Matthew Svoboda	(Canada) Toronto FC
99	Wyatt Countway	(Canada) Truro Tsunami FC

=== Team staff ===
- General manager - Jennifer McKay
- Head coach - Matthew Smith
- Assistant coach - Ethan Morgan
- Doctor - Deanna Field
- Trainer - Thomas Shreve
- Team official - Laura Archer-Svoboda
- Team official - Mark Svoboda

== Rankings and records ==
=== World rankings ===
Year	Rank	Details	Change
2025	16th	4th Group C	▲7
2023	Unranked	Failed to qualify	▼10
2021	Unranked	Unable to participate due to the COVID-19 pandemic	
2019	13th	5th B-Division	▲1
2017	14th	6th B-Division	▼1
2015	13th	5th B-Division	Steady
2013	13th	5th B-Division	Steady
2011	13th	5th B-Division	▲2
2009	15th	7th B-Division	NEW

=== All-time World Championship records ===
Year	GP	W	D	L	GF	GA	+/-
(Finland) 2009 B-Division	4	1	1	2	30	24	+6
(Germany) 2011 B-Division	4	3	0	1	25	20	+5
(Germany) 2013 B-Division	4	2	1	1	34	18	+16
(Sweden) 2015 B-Division	4	2	1	1	42	31	+11
(Sweden) 2017 B-Division	4	1	0	3	31	40	-9
(Canada) 2019 B-Division	4	2	0	2	31	38	-7
(United States) 2023 Qualifying	2	0	0	2	9	20	-11
(Canada) 2025 Qualifying	3	3	0	0	39	23	+16
(Switzerland) 2025 Final Round	4	0	0	4	17	27	-10
Totals	32	14	3	16	258	241	+17

=== Other international competitions ===
Year	GP	W	D	L	GF	GA	+/-
(Canada) 2019 Exhibition	1	0	0	1	2	21	-19
Totals	1	0	0	1	2	21	-19

=== Head-to-head international records ===
Opponent	GP	W	D	L	GF	GA	+/-
Australia	1	1	0	0	9	2	+7
Denmark	1	0	0	1	11	13	-2
Estonia	4	0	0	4	24	41	-17
Germany	5	1	1	3	34	44	-10
Hungary	2	0	1	1	14	16	-2
Japan	3	3	0	0	44	7	+37
Netherlands	1	0	0	1	1	7	-6
Norway	1	0	0	1	5	15	-10
Poland	1	1	0	0	7	4	+3
Russia	2	1	0	1	12	10	+2
Singapore	1	0		1	5	6	-1
Slovenia	2	0	1	1	7	14	-7
Spain	1	1	0	0	3	1	+2
Switzerland	1	0	0	1	2	21	-19
United States	7	5	0	2	75	60	+15
Totals	34	14	3	17	260	262	-2
