= Victor Andersson =

Swedish footballer

Personal information
- Full name: Gabriel Victor David Gonçalves Andersson
- Date of birth: 22 October 2004 (age 22)
- Place of birth: Danderyd, Sweden
- Height: 1.74 m (5 ft 9 in)
- Positions: Winger; central midfielder

Team information
- Current team: Vitória de Guimarães
- Number: 19

Youth career
- 2009–2012: IFK Österåker
- 2013–2014: IFK Stocksund
- 2015–2019: Hammarby IF
- 2019: Nacka United FF
- 2019: Vasalund IF
- 2020: Djurgårdens IF
- 2021–2022: AIK

Senior career*
Years	Team	Apps	(Gls)
2022–2026	AIK	44	(4)
2026–	Vitória de Guimarães	1	(0)

International career^{‡}
2023	Sweden U19	1	(0)
2024–2026	Sweden U21	3	(0)
- * Club domestic league appearances and goals as of 12 September 2026 ‡ National team caps and goals as of 18:01, 4 June 2026 (UTC)

Gabriel Victor David Gonçalves Andersson (born 22 October 2004) is a Swedish footballer who plays as a winger or central midfielder for Primeira Liga club Vitória de Guimarães.

== Early life ==
Born in Danderyd, Sweden, to a Brazilian mother and a Swedish-Guatemalan father, he has both Guatemalan and Swedish citizenships. Andersson grew up in Österåker and started to play youth football with local club IFK Österåker at age five. He later went on to represent IFK Stocksund for two years, before moving to the youth academy of Hammarby IF in 2015. After four seasons with Hammarby, Andersson represented both Nacka United FF and Vasalund IF in 2019, before moving to Djurgårdens IF in 2020. In 2021, Andersson joined the youth academy of AIK and became part of the senior squad in 2023.

== Club career ==
=== AIK ===
On 4 September 2022, Andersson made his debut for AIK in Allsvenskan, coming on as a substitute in a 4–0 home win against GIF Sundsvall. On 24 October the same year, Andersson was promoted to the club's senior squad, signing a five-year contract.

=== Vitória de Guimarães ===
On 21 August 2026, Andersson signed with Vitória de Guimarães in Portugal for four seasons.

== Career statistics ==
=== Club ===
As of 24 October 2022

Club	Season	League			Cup		Continental		Total	
Club	Season	Division	Apps	Goals	Apps	Goals	Apps	Goals	Apps	Goals
AIK	2022	Allsvenskan	1	0	0	0	0	0	1	0
Total			1	0	0	0	0	0	1	0
Career total			1	0	0	0	0	0	1	0
