= 2019 Men's U-19 World Floorball Championships =

Floorball competition

Tournament details
- Host country: Canada
- Venues: 2
- Dates: May 8–12, 2019
- Teams: 8

Final positions
- Champions: Czech Republic (1st title)
- Runners-up: Sweden
- Third place: Finland
- Fourth place: Switzerland

Tournament statistics
- Matches played: 18
- Goals scored: 200 (11.11 per match)
- Scoring leader(s): (Sweden) Victor Wettergren (13 points)

The 2019 Men's U-19 World Floorball Championships were the tenth world championships in men's under-19 floorball. The tournament took place from May 8–12, 2019 in Halifax, Canada, and it was the first men's under-19 world championships played outside of Europe.

== Qualification ==
All teams in the A-Division qualified directly to the 2019 U-19 WFC based on the results of the 2017 Men's U-19 World Floorball Championships.

== Venues ==
Zatzman Sportsplex	Dalplex
The primary arena, used for most A-Division games and all championships games.	The secondary arena, located on the campus of Dalhousie University, primarily used for B-Division games.
Address: 110 Wyse Rd, Dartmouth, NS B3A 1M2	Address: 6260 South St, Halifax, NS B3H 4R2

== Tournament groups ==
Group A	Group B
Finland Latvia Norway Switzerland	Czech Republic Denmark Slovakia Sweden

== Preliminary round ==
=== Group A ===
Pos	Team	Pld	W	D	L	GF	GA	GD	Pts	Qualification
1	Finland	3	3	0	0	24	10	+14	6	Semifinals
2	Switzerland	3	2	0	1	17	13	+4	4	Semifinals
3	Latvia	3	1	0	2	13	17	−4	2	Fifth place game
4	Norway	3	0	0	3	8	22	−14	0	Seventh place game

Source: IFF
Rules for classification: 1) points; 2) head-to-head points; 3) head-to-head goal difference;

All times are local (UTC -3).

8 May 2019; 8:00	Latvia	6–2 (3–0, 2–0, 1–2)	Norway	Zatzman Sportsplex, Dartmouth, NS

11:00	Finland	6–4 (1–0, 3–1, 2–3)	Switzerland	Zatzman Sportsplex, Dartmouth, NS

9 May 2019; 8:00	Norway	4–9 (0–1, 2–3, 2–5)	Finland	Zatzman Sportsplex, Dartmouth, NS

9 May 2019; 17:00	Switzerland	6–5 (3–1, 1–1, 2–3)	Latvia	Dalplex, Halifax

10 May 2019; 11:00	Finland	9–2 (2–0, 4–2, 3–0)	Latvia	Zatzman Sportsplex, Dartmouth, NS

10 May 2019; 14:00	Switzerland	7–2 (2–1, 3–1, 2–0)	Norway	Dalplex, Halifax

=== Group B ===
Pos	Team	Pld	W	D	L	GF	GA	GD	Pts	Qualification
1	Czech Republic	3	3	0	0	24	6	+18	6	Semifinals
2	Sweden	3	2	0	1	30	14	+16	4	Semifinals
3	Slovakia	3	1	0	2	15	23	−8	2	Fifth place game
4	Denmark	3	0	0	3	9	35	−26	0	Seventh place game

Source: IFF
Rules for classification: 1) points; 2) head-to-head points; 3) head-to-head goal difference;

All times are local (UTC -3).

8 May 2019; 14:00	Sweden	1–5 (0–2, 1–1, 0–2)	Czech Republic	Zatzman Sportsplex, Dartmouth, NS

8 May 2019; 17:00	Denmark	2–8 (0–2, 1–3, 1–3)	Slovakia	Dalplex, Halifax

9 May 2019; 11:00	Czech Republic	12–2 (4–0, 4–1, 4–1)	Denmark	Zatzman Sportsplex, Dartmouth, NS

9 May 2019; 14:00	Slovakia	4–14 (1–4, 1–3, 2–7)	Sweden	Zatzman Sportsplex, Dartmouth, NS

10 May 2019; 8:00	Sweden	15–5 (7–3, 4–1, 4–1)	Denmark	Zatzman Sportsplex, Dartmouth, NS

10 May 2019; 11:00	Czech Republic	7–3 (0–1, 5–1, 2–1)	Slovakia	Dalplex, Halifax

== Placement round ==
=== Seventh place game ===
11 May 2019; 17:00	Denmark	6–4 (2–0, 2–1, 2–3)	Norway	Dalplex, Halifax

=== Fifth place game ===
11 May 2019; 8:00	Latvia	6–5 (3–1, 2–1, 1–3)	Slovakia	Zatzman Sportsplex, Dartmouth, NS

== Final round ==
Semifinals
1	Czech Republic	9
4	Switzerland	4
3	Sweden	8
2	Finland	2

Finals
Czech Republic	8
Sweden	2

=== Semifinals ===
11 May 2019; 11:00	Czech Republic	9–4 (4–0, 3–3, 2–1)	Switzerland	Zatzman Sportsplex, Dartmouth, NS

11 May 2019; 14:00	Finland	2–8 (0–3, 0–2, 2–3)	Sweden	Zatzman Sportsplex, Dartmouth, NS

=== Bronze medal game ===
12 May 2019; 13:00	Switzerland	2–4 (1–1, 1–2, 0–1)	Finland	Zatzman Sportsplex, Dartmouth, NS

=== Gold medal game ===
12 May 2019; 16:00	Czech Republic	8–2 (0–0, 3–0, 5–2)	Sweden	Zatzman Sportsplex, Dartmouth, NS

== Final standings ==
Gold medal	Czech Republic
Silver medal	Sweden
Bronze medal	Finland
4	Switzerland
5	Latvia
6	Slovakia
7	Denmark
8	Norway

Norway was relegated to the C and D groups at the 2021 Men's U-19 World Floorball Championships.

== See also ==
- 2019 Men's U-19 World Floorball Championships B-Division
