= Russia men's national under-19 floorball team =

Youth floorball team representing Russia

Russia Men's U-19 National Floorball Team
- Founded: 2001
- Coach: (Russia) Roman Vostriakov
- IFF Ranking: 26th (2023)
- First game: (Russia) 8 – 0 (Hungary); November 6, 2001
- Largest win: (Russia) 26 – 1 (Georgia (country)); September 13, 2008
- Largest defeat: (Finland) 23 – 1 (Russia); November 6, 2003

The Russia Men's Under-19 National Floorball Team is the men's under-19 national floorball team of Russia, and a member of the International Floorball Federation. The team is composed of the best Russian floorball players under the age of 19.

The team participated in the first two Under-19 World Championships in the top division, in 2001 in Germany and in 2003 in the Czech Republic, finishing in 6th and the last 8th place, respectively.

The Russian under-19 men's team was ranked 26th in the world at floorball in 2023.

== Records ==
=== All-Time World Championship Records ===
Year	GP	W	D	L	GF	GA	+/-	Result
Germany 2001	6	2	1	3	19	25	-6	6th
Czech Republic 2003	4	0	0	4	8	50	-42	8th
Latvia 2005	5	5	0	0	50	16	+34	9th
Slovakia EUR Qualifiers 2007	3	1	0	2	10	14	-4	DNQ
Hungary EUR Qualifiers 2008	5	4	1	0	61	8	+53	Qualified
Finland 2009	4	2	0	2	32	17	+15	13th
Spain EUR Qualifiers 2010	4	3	1	0	30	9	+21	Qualified
Germany 2011	4	1	0	3	23	21	+2	14th
Russia EUR1 Qualifiers 2018	5	3	1	1	38	17	+21	Qualified
Canada 2019	5	4	0	1	37	30	+7	11th
Total	45	25	4	16	308	207	+101	

=== Head-to-Head International Records ===
Opponent	GP	W	D	L	GF	GA	+/-
Hungary	5	3	1	1	29	13	+16
Denmark	4	1	1	2	13	20	-7
Slovenia	4	1	0	3	12	22	-10
Estonia	3	1	1	1	23	16	+7
Netherlands	3	3	0	0	30	7	+23
Spain	3	2	1	0	25	3	+22
Austria	2	2	0	0	26	6	+20
Canada	2	1	0	1	10	12	-2
Finland	2	0	0	2	2	30	-28
Poland	2	2	0	0	17	12	+5
Slovakia	2	1	0	1	10	7	+3
Switzerland	2	0	0	2	3	19	-16
Australia	1	1	0	0	11	2	+9
Belgium	1	1	0	0	10	3	+7
Czech Republic	1	0	0	1	0	5	-5
France	1	1	0	0	10	1	+9
Georgia	1	1	0	0	26	1	+25
Germany	1	0	0	1	6	8	-2
Great Britain	1	1	0	0	15	0	+15
Japan	1	1	0	0	7	6	+1
Norway	1	0	0	1	4	7	-3
Singapore	1	1	0	0	11	4	+7
United States	1	1	0	0	8	4	+4
Totals	45	25	4	16	308	207	+101
