= Vladimir Churkin =

Soviet footballer (1953–2021)

Vladimir Dmitrievich Churkin (2 March 1953 – 17 April 2021) was a Soviet and Russian football player and coach who played as a goalkeeper.
