= 3 Nations Floorball League =

International floorball competition

- Sport: Floorball
- Founded: 2020
- Director: Gerold Rachlinger
- No. of teams: 9
- Country: Slovenia; Hungary; Austria
- Continent: Europe
- Most recent champions: (Slovenia) Insport Škofja Loka (2022, 1st title)

3 Nations Floorball League is the central European floorball league founded in 2020. The league mainly focuses on teams from Slovenia, Austria and Hungary.
