= Slovenia men's national under-19 floorball team =

Slovenia Men's U-19 National Floorball Team
- Founded: 2007
- Coach: (Slovenia) Gorazd Tomc
- IFF Ranking: 12th (2025)
- First game: (Slovenia) 5 - 0 (Russia); April 27, 2007
- Largest win: (Slovenia) 27 - 2 (United Kingdom); September 9, 2016
- Largest defeat: (Slovakia) 19 - 3 (Slovenia); April 28, 2007

The Slovenia Men's Under-19 National Floorball Team is the men's under-19 national floorball team of the Slovenia, and a member of the International Floorball Federation. The team is composed of the best Slovenian floorball players under the age of 19. After 2025 U-19 World Championships the team is ranked 12th in the world at floorball.

== Records ==
=== All-Time World Championship Records ===
Year	GP	W	D	L	GF	GA	+/-	Result
Slovakia EUR Qualifiers 2007	3	2	0	1	20	28	-8	Did not qualify
Hungary EUR Qualifiers 2008	5	2	2	1	33	15	+18	Did not qualify
Italy EUR Qualifiers 2012	4	3	0	1	11	6	+5	Qualified
Germany 2013	4	1	1	2	17	26	-9	15th
Italy EUR Qualifiers 2016	4	3	0	1	49	17	+32	Did not qualify
Russia EUR1 Qualifiers 2018	5	5	0	0	40	19	+21	Qualified
Canada 2019	5	3	0	2	42	31	+11	10th
Total	30	19	3	8	212	142	+70	

=== Head-to-Head International Records ===
Opponent	GP	W	D	L	GF	GA	+/-
Russia	4	3	1	0	22	12	+10
Belgium	3	3	0	0	23	11	+12
Germany	3	0	0	3	10	28	-18
Hungary	3	1	1	1	22	23	-1
Spain	3	1	1	1	9	10	-1
Canada	2	1	1	0	14	7	+7
Estonia	2	1	0	1	11	13	-2
Great Britain	2	2	0	0	32	4	+28
Australia	1	1	0	0	8	7	+1
Austria	1	1	0	0	7	3	+4
France	1	1	0	0	13	0	+13
Georgia	1	1	0	0	18	1	+17
Italy	1	1	0	0	1	0	+1
Netherlands	1	1	0	0	5	2	+3
New Zealand	1	1	0	0	14	2	+12
Slovakia	1	0	0	1	3	19	-16
Totals	31	20	3	8	218	147	+71
