= Japan men's national under-19 floorball team =

Youth floorball team representing Japan

Japan Men's U-19 National Floorball Team
- Founded: 2003
- First game: (Japan) 6 – 6 (Slovakia); November 5, 2003
- Largest win: (Japan) 12 – 2 (New Zealand); May 11, 2019
- Largest defeat: (Poland) 23 – 2 (Japan); May 10, 2013

The Japan Men's Under-19 National Floorball Team is the men's under-19 national floorball team of Japan, and a member of the International Floorball Federation. The team is composed of the best Japanese floorball players under the age of 19. As of Match 2025, the Japan under-19 men's team is currently ranked 27th in the world at floorball. The last time it played in the B-Division at the 2019 U-19 World Floorball Championships. Since 2021, the division system has been abandoned, and the team has never qualified to the tournament anymore.

== Records ==
=== All-Time World Championship Records ===
Year	GP	W	D	L	GF	GA	+/-	Result
Czech Republic 2003	4	1	1	2	19	17	+2	15th
Latvia 2005	4	1	0	3	14	29	-15	15th
Switzerland 2007	4	0	1	3	15	39	-24	16th
Finland 2009	4	0	0	4	7	59	-52	16th
Germany 2013	4	1	0	3	16	59	-43	14th
Sweden 2015	4	0	0	4	15	53	-38	16th
Japan AOFC Qualifiers 2016	3	2	0	1	18	10	+8	Qualified
Sweden 2017	4	0	0	4	11	46	-35	16th
New Zealand AOFC Qualifiers 2018	2	0	2	0	12	12	+0	Qualified
Canada 2019	4	1	0	3	26	19	+7	15th
Total	37	6	4	27	153	343	-190	

=== Head-to-Head International Records ===
Opponent	GP	W	D	L	GF	GA	+/-
Australia	4	1	1	2	23	26	-3
Estonia	4	0	0	4	6	37	-31
Canada	3	0	0	3	7	44	-37
Germany	3	0	0	3	3	30	-27
New Zealand	3	2	1	0	27	12	+15
Poland	3	0	0	3	6	47	-41
United States	3	0	0	3	18	25	-7
Austria	2	0	0	2	2	11	-9
Hungary	2	0	0	2	5	32	-27
Netherlands	2	1	1	0	13	10	+3
Slovakia	2	0	1	1	7	14	-7
Denmark	1	0	0	1	1	16	-15
Georgia	1	1	0	0	13	5	+8
Iran	1	1	0	0	7	1	+6
Italy	1	0	0	1	8	12	-4
Norway	1	0	0	1	1	14	-13
Russia	1	0	0	1	6	7	-1
Totals	37	6	4	27	153	343	-190
