= United States men's national under-19 floorball team =

United States Men's U-19 National Floorball Team
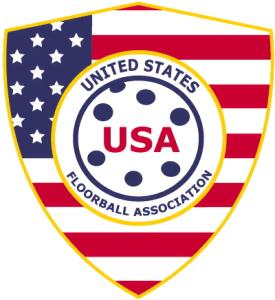
- Short name: USA Men's U-19
- Founded: 2015
- Coach: (United States) Derek Moser
- First game: (United States) 3 - 12 (Hungary); April 29, 2015
- Largest win: (United States) 11 - 5 (Canada); September 2, 2022
- Largest defeat: (Germany) 18 - 4 (United States); May 4, 2017

The United States Men's Under-19 National Floorball Team is the men's under-19 national floorball team of the United States, and a member of the International Floorball Federation. The team is composed of the best American floorball players under the age of 19. The United States' under-19 men's team is currently ranked 25th in the world at floorball and failed to qualify for the 2025 World Floorball Championships.

The United States National Team is organized by USA Floorball.

== Roster ==
The roster of Team USA at the 2027 U-19 WFC Qualifiers.

As of June 19, 2026

#	Player	Club	Pos.	Grip	Age	Birthplace
2	Yeechung Chen	China Mars	F	R	17	United States
7	Mathieu Bertrand	(United States) Chicago Dogs	D	L	17	United States
8	Taylor Liechty	(United States) Utah Floorball	F	R	17	United States
10	Liam Lederman	(United States) Colorado FC	D	R	15	United States
12	Bohdan Durbala	(United States) New York Floorball Club	F	L	17	Ukraine
15	Oliver Parent	(United States) Colorado FC	F	L	17	Japan
18	Igor Ferry	(United States) Austin FC	F	L	16	United States
19	Nathanael Boenheim	(Germany) Floor Fighters Chemnitz	F	L	16	Germany
22	Taavi Salmela	(United States) Duluth Growlers	D	L	17	United States
25	Kaleb Winder	(United States) Utah Floorball	GK	L	17	United States
29	Thomas Merritt	(United States) Chicago Dogs	D	L	16	United States
34	Maurin Engel	(Switzerland) USNTDP Europe	F	L	17	United States
37	Karl Szepvolgyi	(Singapore) Big Blue Floorball School	F	R	15	Singapore
39	Owen Dummeldinger	(United States) Chicago Dogs	F	R	17	United States
60	Kai Koivisto	(United States) Utah Floorball	F	L	15	Finland
72	Konrad Grum	(United States) Chicago Dogs	F	R	16	United States
88	James Addington	(United States) Chicago Dogs	F	L	15	United States
91	Harrison Tan	(United States) Austin FC	GK	R	15	United States
92	Gavin Stone	(United States) Austin FC	F	L	14	United States
95	Maxwell Trybom	(Sweden) KAIS Mora IF	D	R	16	United States

=== Team Staff ===
Head Coach - Derek Moser (United States)

General Manager - Keene Addington (United States)

Assistant General Manager - Cole Connor (United States)

Assistant General Manager - Bryan Bagley (United States)

Assistant Coach - Trent Kling (United States)

Assistant Coach - Case Connor (United States)

Assistant Coach - Doug Kimball (United States)

== Records ==
=== All-Time World Championship Records ===
Year	GP	W	D	L	GF	GA	+/-	Result
Sweden 2015	4	1	0	3	26	47	-21	15th
Sweden 2017	4	1	0	3	13	42	-29	15th
Canada 2019	4	1	0	3	21	35	-14	14th
Denmark 2023	4	0	0	4	13	47	-34	16th
Total	16	3	0	12	73	171	-98	

=== Head-to-Head International Records ===
Opponent	GP	W	D	L	GF	GA	+/-
Canada	7	2	0	5	60	75	-15
Japan	3	3	0	0	25	18	+7
Denmark	2	0	0	2	3	27	-24
Hungary	2	0	0	2	4	22	-18
Australia	1	0	0	1	1	8	-7
Austria	1	0	0	1	6	9	-3
Estonia	1	0	0	1	1	12	-11
Germany	1	0	0	1	4	18	-14
New Zealand	1	0	1	0	5	5	+0
Poland	1	0	0	1	3	10	-7
Russia	1	0	0	1	4	8	-4
Singapore	1	0	0	1	5	12	-7
Totals	22	5	1	16	121	224	-103
