= 2015 Men's U-19 World Floorball Championships =

Floorball competition

2015 Men's U19 World Floorball Championships
A-Division

Tournament details
- Host country: Sweden
- Venue: 1 (in 1 host city)
- Dates: 29 April - 3 May 2015
- Teams: 8

Final positions
- Champions: Finland (3rd title)
- Runners-up: Switzerland
- Third place: Czech Republic
- Fourth place: Sweden

Tournament statistics
- Matches played: 18
- Goals scored: 230 (12.78 per match)
- Attendance: 9,218 (512 per match)
- Scoring leader(s): (Finland) Ville Lastikka (14 points)

The 2015 Men's U-19 World Floorball Championships were the eighth world championships in men's under-19 floorball. The tournament took place over April 29 to May 3, 2015, in Helsingborg, Sweden.

Finland won their 3rd world championship total by winning Switzerland in the final with goals 13–3. Host team Sweden ended to 4th place when Czechia won them with goals 7–6 in the bronze medal game on the overtime. This is the first and the only time when Sweden ended the international floorball tournament without medal.

== Championship results ==
=== Preliminary round ===
==== Group A ====
Team	Pld	W	D	L	GF	GA	GD	Pts
Sweden	3	3	0	0	24	7	+17	6
Czech Republic	3	2	0	1	27	9	+18	4
Poland	3	1	0	2	11	20	−9	2
Norway	3	0	0	3	6	32	−26	0

29 April 2015; 16:30	Czech Republic	10 – 4 (4–0, 4–3, 2–1)	Poland	Helsingborg Arena, Helsingborg; Attendance: 122

29 April 2015; 19:15	Sweden	13 – 2 (6-1, 6-0, 1-1)	Norway	Helsingborg Arena, Helsingborg; Attendance: 444

30 April 2015; 16:30	Poland	1 – 6 (1-3, 0-2, 0-1)	Sweden	Helsingborg Arena, Helsingborg; Attendance: 287

30 April 2015; 19:15	Czech Republic	13 – 0 (4-0, 3-0, 6-0)	Norway	Helsingborg Arena, Helsingborg; Attendance: 186

1 May 2015; 16:30	Sweden	5 – 4 (1-1, 3-0, 1-3)	Czech Republic	Helsingborg Arena, Helsingborg; Attendance: 713

1 May 2015; 19:15	Norway	4 – 6 (0-2, 0-0, 4-4)	Poland	Helsingborg Arena, Helsingborg; Attendance: 214

==== Group B ====
Team	Pld	W	D	L	GF	GA	GD	Pts
Finland	3	3	0	0	30	11	+19	6
Switzerland	3	2	0	1	21	22	−1	4
Slovakia	3	0	1	2	17	20	−3	1
Latvia	3	0	1	2	12	27	−15	1

29 April 2015; 11:30	Switzerland	11 – 5 (2–2, 4–0, 5–3)	Latvia	Helsingborg Arena, Helsingborg; Attendance: 207

29 April 2015; 13:45	Finland	8 – 6 (2-0, 1-4, 5-2)	Slovakia	Helsingborg Arena, Helsingborg; Attendance: 444

30 April 2015; 16:30	Slovakia	6 – 6 (2-2, 0-4, 4-0)	Latvia	Helsingborg Arena, Helsingborg; Attendance: 201

30 April 2015; 19:15	Finland	12 – 4 (3-0, 6-2, 3-2)	Switzerland	Helsingborg Arena, Helsingborg; Attendance: 322

1 May 2015; 16:30	Switzerland	6 – 5 (2-1, 2-0, 2-4)	Slovakia	Helsingborg Arena, Helsingborg; Attendance: 248

1 May 2015; 19:15	Finland	10 – 1 (3-1, 2-0, 5-0)	Latvia	Helsingborg Arena, Helsingborg; Attendance: 382

=== Placement round ===
==== 7th Place match ====
2 May 2015; 09:45	Latvia	5 – 3 (4-0, 0-3, 1-0)	Norway	Helsingborg Arena, Helsingborg; Attendance: 284

==== 5th Place match ====
2 May 2015; 09:45	Slovakia	12 – 2 (4-0, 5-0, 3-2)	Poland	Helsingborg Arena, Helsingborg; Attendance: 87

=== Final round ===
Semifinals
Sweden	6
Switzerland	7
Finland	6
Czech Republic	2

Finals
Switzerland	3
Finland	13

==== Semifinals ====
2 May 2015; 12:45	Finland	6 – 2 (2-0, 4-0, 0-2)	Czech Republic	Helsingborg Arena, Helsingborg; Attendance: 873

2 May 2015; 19:15	Sweden	6 – 7 (1-3, 1-2, 4-1, 0-0, 2-3)	Switzerland	Helsingborg Arena, Helsingborg; Attendance: 1,325

==== Bronze Medal match ====
3 May 2015; 12:00	Czech Republic	7 – 6 (2-2, 3-2, 1-2, 1-0)	Sweden	Helsingborg Arena, Helsingborg; Attendance: 1,334

==== Final ====
3 May 2015; 12:00	Finland	13 – 3 (3-1, 6-1, 4-1)	Switzerland	Helsingborg Arena, Helsingborg; Attendance: 1,778

=== Final standings ===
Rk.	Team
1st place, gold medalist(s)	Finland
2nd place, silver medalist(s)	Switzerland
3rd place, bronze medalist(s)	Czech Republic
4	Sweden
5	Slovakia
6	Poland
7	Latvia
8	Norway

Norway was relegated to the B-Division for the 2017 Men's U-19 World Floorball Championships.
