= Australia men's national under-19 floorball team =

Youth floorball team representing Australia

Australia Men's U-19 National Floorball Team
- Founded: 2008
- Coach: (Sweden) Carl Hammarlund
- IFF Ranking: 10th (2025)
- First game: (Australia) 3 - 2 (Singapore); 28 January 2011
- Largest win: (Australia) 15 - 0 (Iran); 19 September 2016
- Largest defeat: (Denmark) 19 - 2 (Australia); 5 May 2011

The Australia Men's Under-19 National Floorball Team is the men's under-19 national floorball team of Australia, and a member of the International Floorball Federation. The team is composed of the best Australian floorball players under the age of 19. After 2025 U-19 World Championships the team is ranked 10th in the world at floorball.

== Roster ==
As of March 9th, 2025

#	Player	Club	Pos.	Grip	Age	Birthplace
44	Flynn Craig	(Australia) Roosters FC	D	R	18	Australia
2	Ben Rak	(Czech Republic) Snipers Bratislava	F	L	18	Australia
7	Ollie Marie-Soong	(Australia) Perth Falcons FC	D/F	R	20	Australia
9	Reid Knox Lyttle	(Australia) Pert Pirates FBC	D	R	18	US
10	Dylan Ross	(Australia) Perth Pirates FBC	F	R	26	Australia
14	Piran Wallace	(Australia) Perth Raptors FC	GK	-	15	Australia
15	Alex Skett	(Australia) Perth Roosters	F	R	18	Australia
6	Oliver Franz	(Australia) Northen Beaches Sting Rays	F	L	20	Australia
27	Jack Keene	(Australia) Perth Roosters	D	R	26	Australia
36	Jordan Noel	(Australia) Pakenham Squishees	F	L	24	Australia
42	Owen Crofts	(Australia) Perth Roosters	F	R	23	Australia
46	Cameron Stephenson	(Australia) Pakenham Squishees	D	R	25	Australia
50	Jaysen Dale	(Australia) Pakenham Squishees	D	L	24	Australia
55	Harrison Sargeant	(Australia) Raptors FC	G	R	24	Australia
63	Dylan Clutterbuck	(Australia) Pakenham Squishees	D	R	24	Australia
87	Eoin Broome	(Australia) Pakenham Squishees	F	R	24	Australia
88	Mitchell Merritt	(Australia) Western Wolves FC	D	R	26	Australia
92	Toby Knox Lyttle	(Australia) Perth Roosters	D	R	23	Australia

=== Team Staff ===
Head Coach - Joshua Hay (Australia)

Coach - Ryan Alexandrakis (Australia)

Team Manager - Jason Burton (Australia)

Team Official - Lars van der Sar (Netherlands)

== Records ==
=== All-Time World Championship Records ===
Year	GP	W	D	L	GF	GA	+/-	Result
Germany 2011	4	0	0	4	10	51	-41	16th
Germany 2013	4	0	0	4	16	41	-25	16th
Australia AOFC Qualifiers 2014	2	1	1	0	12	6	+6	Qualified
Sweden 2015	4	1	0	3	15	39	-24	14th
Japan AOFC Qualifiers 2016	3	3	0	0	28	5	+23	Qualified
Sweden 2017	5	3	0	2	24	20	+4	12th
New Zealand AOFC Qualifiers 2018	2	0	2	0	7	7	+0	Did not qualify
Total	24	8	3	13	112	169	-57	

=== Head-to-Head International Records ===
Opponent	GP	W	D	L	GF	GA	+/-
Japan	4	2	1	1	26	23	+3
New Zealand	4	2	2	0	21	10	+11
Germany	3	1	0	2	7	26	-19
Hungary	3	1	0	2	12	23	-11
Estonia	2	0	0	2	7	15	-8
Singapore	2	2	0	0	7	4	+3
Canada	1	0	0	1	2	9	-7
Denmark	1	0	0	1	2	19	-17
Iran	1	1	0	0	15	0	+15
Poland	1	0	0	1	0	13	-13
Russia	1	0	0	1	2	11	-9
Slovenia	1	0	0	1	7	8	-1
Spain	1	0	0	1	3	11	-8
United States	1	1	0	0	8	1	+7
Totals	26	10	3	13	119	173	-54
