= Slovakia men's national under-19 floorball team =

Slovak men's under-19 national floorball team

Slovakia Men's U-19 National Floorball Team
- Founded: 2003
- Coach: (Slovakia) Marek Onderko
- IFF Ranking: 5th (2025)
- First game: Slovakia 6–6 Japan (5 November 2003)
- Largest win: Slovakia 19–3 Slovenia (28 April 2007)
- Largest defeat: Slovakia 0–20 Sweden (9 November 2007)

The Slovakia Men's Under-19 National Floorball Team is the men's under-19 national floorball team of the Slovakia, and a member of the International Floorball Federation. The team is composed of the best Slovak floorball players under the age of 19. The Slovak under-19 men's team is currently ranked 6th in the world at floorball. They finished 7th at 2021 U-19 World Floorball Championship in Brno, Czech Republic.

== All-time world championships results ==
| Year | Position | GP | W | D | L | GF | GA | +/- |
|---|---|---|---|---|---|---|---|---|
| (Germany) 2001 | Did not compete | | | | | | | |
| (Czech Republic) 2003 | In B Division | | | | | | | |
| (Latvia) 2005 | In B Division | | | | | | | |
| (Switzerland) 2007 | 7th | 5 | 1 | 0 | 4 | 15 | 49 | –34 |
| (Finland) 2009 | 7th | 6 | 5 | 0 | 1 | 12 | 30 | –18 |
| (Germany) 2011 | 6th | 4 | 0 | 1 | 3 | 12 | 26 | –14 |
| (Germany) 2013 | 7th | 4 | 1 | 0 | 3 | 19 | 24 | –5 |
| (Sweden) 2015 | 5th | 4 | 1 | 1 | 2 | 24 | 22 | +2 |
| (Sweden) 2017 | 7th | 4 | 1 | 0 | 3 | 17 | 35 | –18 |
| (Canada) 2019 | 6th | 4 | 1 | 0 | 3 | 20 | 29 | –9 |
| (Czech Republic) 2021 | 7th | 5 | 2 | 0 | 3 | 35 | 44 | –9 |
| (Denmark) 2023 | | | | | | | | |
| Total: | | 36 | 12 | 2 | 22 | 154 | 259 | –105 |

== World championships results against other teams ==
| Team | GP | W | D | L | GF | GA | GD | BW | BD |
