= Great Britain Men's national floorball team =

Great Britain
- Association: United Kingdom Floorball Federation
- Head coach: Bengt Strandh

First international
- Great Britain (United Kingdom) 6–5 Belgium, 4 April 1999

Biggest win
- Great Britain (United Kingdom) 12–3 Lithuania, 8 November 2015

Biggest defeat
- Great Britain (United Kingdom) 0–27 Poland, 1 February 2012

World Floorball Championship
- Appearances: 0

The Great Britain men's national floorball team represents Great Britain in Floorball. It is controlled by the United Kingdom Floorball Federation, which is a member of the International Floorball Federation. The squad participated in the World Floorball Championships qualification tournament numerous times but never qualified into the final tournament.
