= 2009 Men's Asia Pacific Floorball Championships =

2009 Asia Pacific Floorball Championships
Tournament details
- Host country: South Korea
- Venue(s): 1 (in 1 host city)
- Dates: March 25–29, 2009
- Teams: 6

Final positions
- Champions: Japan (3rd title)

Tournament statistics
- Matches played: 15
- Goals scored: 337 (22.47 per match)
- Scoring leader(s): (Australia) Anthony Boteler
- All statistics correct as of 03:29, March 30, 2009 (UTC).

The 2009 Men's Asia Pacific Floorball Championships were the sixth such championships in men's floorball. They were held from March 25 to March 29, 2009 in Pyeongtaek, South Korea. All matches were played at the Lee Chung Gymnasium. Singapore came into the tournament as defending champions.

The 2009 Men's Asia Pacific Floorball Championships were just the second to be held outside of Singapore City.

The tournament was organised by the Asia Oceania Floorball Confederation (AOFC).

A new floorball world record was set on March 26, 2009, when Japan defeated India, 59:0. The previous world record was in a women's under-19 friendly, where Poland defeated Ukraine by a score of 50:0.

== Championship results ==
Team	GP	W	D	L	GF	GA	GD	PTS
Japan	5	5	0	0	116	7	+109	10
Australia	5	4	0	1	86	15	+71	8
(South Korea) Korea	5	3	0	2	57	19	+38	6
Malaysia	5	2	0	3	38	38	0	4
Singapore	5	1	0	4	39	59	-20	2
India	5	0	0	5	1	199	-198	0

=== March 25, 2009 ===
March 25, 2009
10.00

Singapore	31:0	India

Pyeongtaek, South Korea
Lee Chung Gymnasium

March 25, 2009
13.00

(South Korea) Korea	2:6	Australia

Pyeongtaek, South Korea
Lee Chung Gymnasium

March 25, 2009
19.00

Japan	14:1	Malaysia

Pyeongtaek, South Korea
Lee Chung Gymnasium

=== March 26, 2009 ===
March 26, 2009
11.30

India	0:59	Japan

Pyeongtaek, South Korea
Lee Chung Gymnasium

March 26, 2009
14.00

Malaysia	2:11	(South Korea) Korea

Pyeongtaek, South Korea
Lee Chung Gymnasium

March 26, 2009
19.00

Australia	18:1	Singapore

Pyeongtaek, South Korea
Lee Chung Gymnasium

=== March 27, 2009 ===
March 27, 2009
11.30

Japan	26:0	Singapore

Pyeongtaek, South Korea
Lee Chung Gymnasium

March 27, 2009
14.00

Malaysia	3:8	Australia

Pyeongtaek, South Korea
Lee Chung Gymnasium

March 27, 2009
19.00

(South Korea) Korea	34:1	India

Pyeongtaek, South Korea
Lee Chung Gymnasium

=== March 28, 2009 ===
March 28, 2009
12.30

India	0:50	Australia

Pyeongtaek, South Korea
Lee Chung Gymnasium

March 28, 2009
15.00

(South Korea) Korea	2:8	Japan

Pyeongtaek, South Korea
Lee Chung Gymnasium

March 28, 2009
17.30

Singapore	5:7	Malaysia

Pyeongtaek, South Korea
Lee Chung Gymnasium

=== March 29, 2009 ===
March 29, 2009
10.00

Malaysia	25:0	India

Pyeongtaek, South Korea
Lee Chung Gymnasium

March 29, 2009
12.30

Australia	4:9	Japan

Pyeongtaek, South Korea
Lee Chung Gymnasium

March 29, 2009
15.00

Singapore	2:8	(South Korea) Korea

Pyeongtaek, South Korea
Lee Chung Gymnasium

== Standings ==
Official Rankings according to the AOFC

Rk.	Team
1st place, gold medalist(s)	Japan
2nd place, silver medalist(s)	Australia
3rd place, bronze medalist(s)	(South Korea) Korea
4.	Malaysia
5.	Singapore
6.	India

Asia Pacific Floorball Championships
Preceded by Perth, Australia; 2008	Host City; Pyeongtaek, South Korea; 2009	Succeeded by Simei, Singapore; 2010

== See also ==
- Asia Oceania Floorball Confederation
- List of Asia Pacific Floorball Champions
