= 2008 Men's Asia Pacific Floorball Championships =

2008 Asia Pacific Floorball Championships
- Official logo of the Asia Pacific Floorball Championships

Tournament details
- Host country: Australia
- Venue: 1 (in 1 host city)
- Dates: August 25–29, 2008
- Teams: 5 (from 4 countries)

Final positions
- Champions: Singapore (3rd title)
- Runners-up: Australia
- Third place: South Korea
- Fourth place: Australia

Tournament statistics
- Matches played: 14
- Goals scored: 127 (9.07 per match)
- All statistics correct as of 18:05, August 29, 2008 (UTC).

The 2008 Men's Asia Pacific Floorball Championships are the fifth such championships in men's floorball. It was held from August 25 to August 29, 2008, in the suburb of Leederville in Perth, Australia. All matches were held at the Loftus Recreation Centre. Singapore captured the 2008 Asia Pacific Floorball Championship by defeating Australia in the finals.

The 2008 Men's Asia Pacific Floorball Championships were the first to be held outside of Singapore City.

The tournament is organised by the Asia Oceania Floorball Confederation (AOFC).

== Championship results ==
=== Preliminary round ===
Team	GP	W	D	L	GF	GA	GD	PTS
Singapore	4	4	0	0	30	8	+22	8
Australia	4	3	0	1	29	12	+17	6
Australia U19	4	2	0	2	22	18	+4	4
(South Korea) Korea	4	1	0	3	15	15	0	2
Malaysia	4	0	0	4	9	49	−40	0

==== August 25, 2008 ====
August 25, 2008
14.00

Malaysia	4:13	Australia

Leederville, Perth, Australia
Loftus Recreation Centre

August 25, 2008
17.00

Singapore	5:2	(South Korea) Korea

Leederville, Perth, Australia
Loftus Recreation Centre

August 25, 2008
20.00

Australia U19	15:2	Malaysia

Leederville, Perth, Australia
Loftus Recreation Centre

==== August 26, 2008 ====
August 26, 2008
10.00

Australia	2:4	Singapore

Leederville, Perth, Australia
Loftus Recreation Centre

August 26, 2008
12.30

(South Korea) Korea	3:4	Australia U19

Leederville, Perth, Australia
Loftus Recreation Centre

August 26, 2008
16.00

Malaysia	2:16	Singapore

Leederville, Perth, Australia
Loftus Recreation Centre

August 26, 2008
19.00

(South Korea) Korea	5:6	Australia

Leederville, Perth, Australia
Loftus Recreation Centre

==== August 27, 2008 ====
August 27, 2008
10.00

Australia U19	2:5	Singapore

Leederville, Perth, Australia
Loftus Recreation Centre

August 27, 2008
12.30

(South Korea) Korea	5:1	Malaysia

Leederville, Perth, Australia
Loftus Recreation Centre

August 27, 2008
19.00

Australia	8:1	Australia U19

Leederville, Perth, Australia
Loftus Recreation Centre

=== Playoffs ===
Semifinals
1	Singapore	4
4	(South Korea) Korea	2
2	Australia	2
3	Australia U19	1

Finals
1	Singapore	5
2	Australia	3

==== Semi-finals ====
August 28, 2008
12.30

Singapore	4:2	(South Korea) Korea

Leederville, Perth, Australia
Loftus Recreation Centre

August 28, 2008
15.00

Australia	2:1	Australia U19

Leederville, Perth, Australia
Loftus Recreation Centre

==== Bronze-medal match ====
August 29, 2008
10.30

(South Korea) Korea	3:2 (Overtime)	Australia U19

Leederville, Perth, Australia
Loftus Recreation Centre

==== Gold-medal match ====
August 29, 2008
13.30

Singapore	5:3	Australia

Leederville, Perth, Australia
Loftus Recreation Centre

== Standings ==
Official Rankings according to the AOFC

Rk.	Team
1st place, gold medalist(s)	Singapore
2nd place, silver medalist(s)	Australia
3rd place, bronze medalist(s)	(South Korea) Korea
4.	Australia U19
5.	Malaysia

Asia Pacific Floorball Championships
Preceded by Singapore City; 2007	Host City; Perth, Australia; 2008	Succeeded by Pyeongtaek, South Korea; 2009

== See also ==
- Asia Oceania Floorball Confederation
- List of Asia Pacific Floorball Champions
