= Indonesian Floorball Association =

Highest floorball governing body in Indonesia

- Abbreviation: IFA
- Formation: 28 October 2009; 16 years ago
- Type: National Sport Association
- Location: Indonesia
- President: Komarudin
- Affiliations: IFF, AOFC
- Website: http://www.floorball.or.id

Indonesian Floorball Association (IFA) is the highest floorball governing body in Indonesia. IFA is founded on 28 October 2009. It has been recognized as 51st member (provisional) of IFF in the same year.

IFA was recognized as a full member of the National Sports Committee of Indonesia on June 3, 2016 and a full member of the Indonesian Olympic Committee on February 10, 2017.

== Chairman ==
No	Name	Start job title	End job title
1	Komarudin	2020	2024
