= Floorball South Africa =

National governing body of floorball in South Africa

- Sport: Floorball
- Jurisdiction: National
- Abbreviation: FSA
- Founded: 2013
- Affiliation: International Floorball Federation
- Headquarters: Port Elizabeth
- Location: 21 Delphinium Drive, Westering 6025, Port Elizabeth
- President: Michael Kliment
- Secretary: Dean Grow

Official website
- www.floorball.co.za
- (South Africa)

Floorball South Africa (FSA) is the national governing body for the sport of floorball in South Africa. Floorball South Africa is an affiliate member of the International Floorball Federation (IFF).

== History ==
Floorball South Africa became IFF Member number 56 in 2013 and was the third member from Africa following the member associations from Sierra Leone and Mozambique. FSA President, Michael Kliment officially introduced the sport to South Africa after consultations with some hockey players seeking alternative but similar sports. After a meeting with IFF officials, a development plan tailored for FSA was agreed on. Subsequently, Floorball South Africa was established on 19 July 2013 leading to its formal acceptance as an affiliate member on 1 September 2013.

The first floorball match was played on 18 January 2014 during a FSA floorball promotion and training session in Port Elizabeth. It was played on a basketball court with the aim of attracting promising floorball players and building a database of floorball players to facilitate the creation of a league.

== See also ==
- Sport in South Africa
