= Pakistan Floorball Federation =

Governing body of floorball in Pakistan

The Pakistan Floorball Federation is the national sports governing body to promote and develop sport of floorball in Pakistan. The federation was established in 2003, in 2004 it was affiliated with International Floorball Federation and its continental association Asia Oceania Floorball Confederation.
