= Lithuanian Floorball Federation =

- IOC nation: LTU
- Sport: Floorball
- Official website: www.lgrf.lt

History
- Year of formation: 2010; 15 years ago

Affiliations
- International federation: International Floorball Federation (IFF)
- IFF member since: 2010; 15 years ago
- National Olympic Committee: Lithuanian National Olympic Committee

Lithuanian Floorball Federation (Lithuanian: Lietuvos grindų riedulio federacija) is the governing body for floorball in the country of Lithuania. It was founded on 7 May 2010.

Five floorball teams are officially LGRF members.
