= 2023 Men's U-19 World Floorball Championships qualification =

Floorball competition

The 2023 Men's U-19 World Floorball Championships qualification is a series of tournaments to decide the teams which will play in the 2023 Men's U-19 World Floorball Championships. The 2023 U-19 World Championship will once again feature 16 teams for the second time. 1 place were allocated to the hosts, Denmark while 8 places were given to the top 8 finishers in 2021. The remaining 7 places were determined by a qualification process.

== Distribution of spots ==
The distribution by confederation for the 2023 Men's U-19 World Floorball Championships will be:

- Host: 1
- Top 8 from 2021: 8 places
- Asia and Oceania: 2 places
- Americas: 1 place
- Europe: 4 places

== Qualified teams ==
Host nation Team qualified directly Team qualified Team failed to qualify Did not enter

| | Date | Venue | Vacancies | Qualified |
|---|---|---|---|---|
| Host nation | 23 February 2021 | | 1 | Denmark |
| Automatically qualified from 2021 | | (Czech Republic) Brno | 8 | Czech Republic; Finland; Sweden; Switzerland; Latvia; Germany; Slovakia; Poland |
| European qualifier 1 | 24–28 January 2023 | (Austria) Salzburg | 2 | Norway; Austria |
| European qualifier 2 | 24–28 January 2023 | (Spain) El Escorial | 2 | Estonia; Slovenia |
| Asian qualification | 29 September – 1 October 2022 | (New Zealand) Wellington | 2 | Australia; Singapore |
| Americas qualification | 2–3 September 2022 | (United States) Draper | 1 | United States |
| Total | | | 16 | |

== Americas qualification ==
The American qualification were played between 2 and 3 September 2022 in Draper, United States at the Sports Centre.

=== Teams ===
- Canada (12)
- United States (14)

=== Group ===
| Pos | Team | Pld | W | D | L | GF | GA | GD | Pts | Qualification |
|---|---|---|---|---|---|---|---|---|---|---|
| 1 | United States (H) | 2 | 2 | 0 | 0 | 20 | 9 | +11 | 4 | 2023 Men's U-19 World Championships |
| 2 | Canada | 2 | 0 | 0 | 2 | 9 | 20 | −11 | 0 | |

Source: IFF
(H) Hosts

| 2 September 2022; 19:00 | United States | 11–5 (1–1, 3–2, 7–2) | Canada | Sports Centre, Draper; Attendance: 332 |

Report

| 3 September 2022; 19:00 | Canada | 4–9 (3–4, 0–3, 1–2) | United States | Sports Centre, Draper; Attendance: 312 |

Report

== Asia-Oceania qualification ==
The Asia-Oceania qualification will be played between 29 September to 1 October 2022 in Wellington, New Zealand. The top two made the 2023 Men's U-19 World Floorball Championships.

=== Group composition ===
- New Zealand (16) (H)
- Australia (20)
- Singapore (27)

=== Group ===
| Pos | Team | Pld | W | D | L | GF | GA | GD | Pts | Qualification |
|---|---|---|---|---|---|---|---|---|---|---|
| 1 | Australia | 2 | 1 | 1 | 0 | 12 | 5 | +7 | 3 | 2023 Men's U-19 World Championships |
| 2 | Singapore | 2 | 1 | 1 | 0 | 11 | 7 | +4 | 3 | 2023 Men's U-19 World Championships |
| 3 | New Zealand (H) | 2 | 0 | 0 | 2 | 6 | 17 | −11 | 0 | |

Source: IFF
(H) Hosts

| 29 September 2022; 19:30 | Singapore | 3–3 (1–0, 1–0, 1–3) | Australia | ASB Sports Centre, Wellington; Attendance: 221 |

Report

| 30 September 2022; 19:30 | New Zealand | 4–8 (3–2, 1–4, 0–2) | Singapore | ASB Sports Centre, Wellington; Attendance: 396 |

Report

| 1 October 2022; 19:30 | Australia | 9–2 (2–1, 4–0, 3–1) | New Zealand | ASB Sports Centre, Wellington; Attendance: 513 |

Report

== European qualification ==
=== Format ===
In Europe, two qualifying tournaments took place where the top 2 qualified the World Championship. Both qualifiers were held from 24 to 28 January 2023. From Africa, Uganda had originally entered the second qualifier but withdrew.

=== European qualification tournament 1 ===
The European qualification tournament 1 was played in Salzburg, Austria.

Group seeding
Norway (8)
Austria (12) (H)
Belgium (13)
Netherlands (21)
France (25)
Great Britain (26)

| Pos | Team | Pld | W | D | L | GF | GA | GD | Pts | Qualification |
|---|---|---|---|---|---|---|---|---|---|---|
| 1 | Norway | 5 | 5 | 0 | 0 | 65 | 12 | +53 | 10 | 2023 Men's U-19 World Championships |
| 2 | Austria (H) | 5 | 3 | 0 | 2 | 22 | 25 | −3 | 6 | 2023 Men's U-19 World Championships |
| 3 | Belgium | 5 | 2 | 1 | 2 | 24 | 38 | −14 | 5 | |
| 4 | Netherlands | 5 | 2 | 0 | 3 | 27 | 37 | −10 | 4 | |
| 5 | Great Britain | 5 | 1 | 1 | 3 | 32 | 42 | −10 | 3 | |
| 6 | France | 5 | 0 | 2 | 3 | 17 | 33 | −16 | 2 | |

Source: IFF
(H) Hosts

| 24 January 2023; 09:00 | Belgium | 9–6 (3–4, 4–2, 2–0) | Netherlands | Sportzentrum Nord, Salzburg; Attendance: 47 |

Report
| Referees: Alexander Gruber; Christoph Gruber |

| 24 January 2023; 11:45 | Austria | 3–1 (0–0, 2–0, 1–1) | France | Sportzentrum Nord, Salzburg; Attendance: 83 |

Report
| Referees: Bartosz Burek; Wojciech Czarnecki |

| 24 January 2023; 14:30 | Norway | 11–4 (7–0, 3–2, 1–2) | Great Britain | Sportzentrum Nord, Salzburg; Attendance: 51 |

Report
| Referees: Frederik Dilger; Rene Potthoff |

| 25 January 2023; 09:00 | Great Britain | 11–8 (6–3, 2–2, 3–3) | Belgium | Sportzentrum Nord, Salzburg; Attendance: 75 |

Report
| Referees: Bartosz Burek; Wojciech Czarnecki |

| 25 January 2023; 11:45 | Netherlands | 3–8 (1–4, 1–2, 1–2) | Austria | Sportzentrum Nord, Salzburg; Attendance: 87 |

Report
| Referees: Frederik Dilger; Rene Potthoff |

| 25 January 2023; 14:30 | France | 3–10 (0–2, 0–5, 3–3) | Norway | Sportzentrum Nord, Salzburg; Attendance: 75 |

Report
| Referees: Alexander Gruber; Christoph Gruber |

| 26 January 2023; 09:00 | Netherlands | 9–2 (2–1, 4–0, 3–1) | France | Sportzentrum Nord, Salzburg; Attendance: 52 |

Report
| Referees: Alexander Gruber; Christoph Gruber |

| 26 January 2023; 11:45 | Austria | 7–4 (2–0, 4–0, 1–4) | Great Britain | Sportzentrum Nord, Salzburg; Attendance: 237 |

Report
| Referees: Frederik Dilger; Rene Potthoff |

| 26 January 2023; 14:30 | Belgium | 1–17 (1–6, 0–6, 0–5) | Norway | Sportzentrum Nord, Salzburg; Attendance: 201 |

Report
| Referees: Bartosz Burek; Wojciech Czarnecki |

| 27 January 2023; 09:00 | Great Britain | 5–8 (4–2, 1–2, 0–4) | Netherlands | Sportzentrum Nord, Salzburg; Attendance: 174 |

Report
| Referees: Alexander Gruber; Christoph Gruber |

| 27 January 2023; 11:45 | Norway | 14–3 (6–1, 3–2, 5–0) | Austria | Sportzentrum Nord, Salzburg; Attendance: 269 |

Report
| Referees: Bartosz Burek; Wojciech Czarnecki |

| 27 January 2023; 14:30 | France | 3–3 (0–3, 1–0, 2–0) | Belgium | Sportzentrum Nord, Salzburg; Attendance: 75 |

Report
| Referees: Frederik Dilger; Rene Potthoff |

| 28 January 2023; 09:00 | Netherlands | 1–13 (1–3, 0–9, 0–1) | Norway | Sportzentrum Nord, Salzburg; Attendance: 125 |

Report
| Referees: Alexander Gruber; Christoph Gruber |

| 28 January 2023; 11:45 | Austria | 1–3 (0–1, 1–1, 0–1) | Belgium | Sportzentrum Nord, Salzburg; Attendance: 312 |

Report
| Referees: Frederik Dilger; Rene Potthoff |

| 28 January 2023; 14:30 | Great Britain | 8–8 (4–2, 3–4, 1–2) | France | Sportzentrum Nord, Salzburg; Attendance: 78 |

Report
| Referees: Alexander Gruber; Christoph Gruber |

=== European qualification tournament 2 ===
The European qualification tournament 2 was played between 24 and 28 January 2023 in El Escorial, Spain.

Group seeding
Estonia (10)
Slovenia (11)
Hungary (14)
Italy (15)
Spain (23) (H)'

| Pos | Team | Pld | W | D | L | GF | GA | GD | Pts | Qualification |
|---|---|---|---|---|---|---|---|---|---|---|
| 1 | Estonia | 4 | 4 | 0 | 0 | 37 | 15 | +22 | 8 | 2023 Men's U-19 World Championships |
| 2 | Slovenia | 4 | 3 | 0 | 1 | 26 | 15 | +11 | 6 | 2023 Men's U-19 World Championships |
| 3 | Hungary | 4 | 2 | 0 | 2 | 35 | 24 | +11 | 4 | |
| 4 | Spain (H) | 4 | 1 | 0 | 3 | 14 | 23 | −9 | 2 | |
| 5 | Italy | 4 | 0 | 0 | 4 | 13 | 48 | −35 | 0 | |
| 6 | Uganda | 0 | 0 | 0 | 0 | 0 | 0 | 0 | 0 | Withdrew |

Source: IFF
(H) Hosts

| 24 January 2023; 16:00 | Estonia | 7–6 (0–1, 4–4, 3–1) | Hungary | Polideportivo Navaarmado Patr, El Escorial; Attendance: 200 |

Report
| Referees: Artem Zolotar; Volodar Ilyk |

| 24 January 2023; 19:00 | Italy | 1–7 (0–3, 1–1, 0–3) | Slovenia | Polideportivo Navaarmado Patr, El Escorial; Attendance: 100 |

Report
| Referees: Martins Larinovs; Aivars Malins |

| 25 January 2023; 16:00 | Slovenia | 3–6 (1–3, 1–0, 1–3) | Estonia | Polideportivo Navaarmado Patr, El Escorial; Attendance: 217 |

Report
| Referees: Martins Larinovs; Aivars Malins |

| 25 January 2023; 19:00 | Spain | 7–3 (0–0, 1–1, 6–2) | Italy | Polideportivo Navaarmado Patr, El Escorial; Attendance: 527 |

Report
| Referees: Artem Zolotar; Volodar Ilyk |

| 26 January 2023; 16:00 | Estonia | 16–3 (6–1, 6–1, 4–1) | Italy | Polideportivo Navaarmado Patr, El Escorial; Attendance: 102 |

Report
| Referees: Artem Zolotar; Volodar Ilyk |

| 26 January 2023; 19:00 | Hungary | 4–3 (1–2, 1–0, 2–1) | Spain | Polideportivo Navaarmado Patr, El Escorial; Attendance: 583 |

Report
| Referees: Martins Larinovs; Aivars Malins |

| 27 January 2023; 16:00 | Slovenia | 8–7 (4–4, 4–0, 3–0) | Hungary | Polideportivo Navaarmado Patr, El Escorial; Attendance: 167 |

Report
| Referees: Artem Zolotar; Volodar Ilyk |

| 27 January 2023; 19:00 | Spain | 3–8 (0–0, 2–4, 1–4) | Estonia | Polideportivo Navaarmado Patr, El Escorial; Attendance: 649 |

Report
| Referees: Martins Larinovs; Aivars Malins |

| 28 January 2023; 12:00 | Hungary | 18–6 (6–0, 6–1, 6–5) | Italy | Polideportivo Navaarmado Patr, El Escorial; Attendance: 156 |

Report
| Referees: Martins Larinovs; Aivars Malins |

| 28 January 2023; 16:00 | Slovenia | 8–1 (3–0, 2–0, 3–1) | Spain | Polideportivo Navaarmado Patr, El Escorial; Attendance: 613 |

Report
| Referees: Artem Zolotar; Volodar Ilyk |
