= Estonian Floorball Union =

Sports governing body in Estonia

Estonian Floorball Union (abbreviation EFU; Estonian: Eesti Saalihoki Liit) is one of the sport governing bodies in Estonia which deals with floorball.

EFU is established on 27 November 1993. EFU is a member of International Floorball Federation and Estonian Olympic Committee.
