= Floorball in India =

Floorball in India is governed by the Indian Floorball Federation. It was created in 2001, but the national floorball championships were held before that time.

The Indian Floorball Federation is a member of the International Floorball Federation.

== Clubs ==
- Floorball Waves (MP)
- Delhi Strikers FBC
- MP Smashers FBC
- UP Quick Silver FBC
- Haryana Warriors FBC
- Punjab Lions FBC
- Ranchi Pirates FBC
