= Australian Floorball Association =

Governing body of floorball in Australia

- Sport: Floorball
- Jurisdiction: National
- Founded: 1996
- Affiliation: International Floorball Federation
- Headquarters: Australia

Official website
- www.floorballaustralia.org.au
- (Australia)

Australian Floorball Association is the governing body for the sport of Floorball in Australia. It is recognised by the Australian Sports Commission as the national sporting organisation (NSO) for floorball in Australia.

== Structure ==
The national body has eight state member associations:

== See also ==
- IFF World Ranking
- Asia Oceania Floorball Confederation
- List of Asia Pacific Floorball champions
