= 3v3 World Floorball Championships =

International floorball competition

- Most recent season or competition: 2026 3v3 World Floorball Championships
- Sport: Floorball
- Founded: 2024; 2 years ago
- Continent: International (IFF)
- Most recent champions: Men: Sweden (2026, 1st title); Women: Sweden (2026, 1st title)
- Most titles: Men: Latvia; Sweden; Switzerland (1 title each); Women: Finland; Sweden; Switzerland (1 title each)
- Related competitions: Men's World Championship; Women's World Championship; Under-19 World Championship

The 3v3 World Floorball Championships are a tournament for national 3v3 teams from member countries of the International Floorball Federation. They have been held regularly every year since 2024 for both men and women. The first two editions of the tournament were held alongside the Under-19 World Floorball Championships, but it will be held as a standalone event in June beginning in 2026.

The reigning champion in both categories is Switzerland, and Latvia and Finland have each won a title in the men's and women's divisions respectively.

The most recent 3v3 World Floorball Championship was hosted in Spain, and the next edition will return to the same venue.

== Format ==
All matches are two halves of 10 minutes each. Group-stage games may end in a draw, but playoff games advance directly to penalty shots. Medal matches may include two minutes of extra time before advancing to the penalty shootout.

There will be 28 men's teams and 23 women's teams competing in the 2026 3v3 World Floorball Championships. There are no qualifications; up to 32 teams may register in each division. The teams are then drawn into groups (A through F for the men, A through E for the women), each consisting of four or five teams. Within a group, teams play round-robin matches against each other.

In the men's division in 2026, the six group winners, six second-place teams, and the four top-ranked third-place teams advance to the 1/8 finals, from which they play a single-elimination bracket to determine a champion. The other two third-place teams and the two top-ranked fourth-place teams advance to a B-Division quarterfinal, with the remaining eight teams going to the B-Division 1/8 finals.

In the women's division in 2026, the five group winners qualify directly to the quarterfinals. The five second-place teams and the best third-place team progress to the 1/8 finals, from which these teams play a single-elimination bracket to determine a champion. The remaining third-place teams qualify to the B-Division quarterfinals, with the remaining eight teams playing in the B-Division 1/8 finals.

Both the men's and women's division will include a bronze medal game between the losing teams of the semifinals.

== Format history ==
In each of the first two editions, the 3v3 World Floorball Championships were held alongside the Under-19 World Floorball Championships in early May. Beginning in 2026, the tournament will be hosted as a standalone event in mid-June.

During the 2024 3v3 World Floorball Championships, each nation was allowed to enter up to two teams. This was reduced to a single team from each nation in the 2025 edition. 2025 was the first year to include a bronze medal match.

== Men's 3v3 World Championships ==
Year	Final venue	Winners	Score	Runners-up	Third place	Score	Fourth place
2024 Details	(Finland) Lahti	Latvia	10–9 (AET)	Sweden	-	-	-
2025 Details	(Switzerland) Winterthur	Switzerland	5–3	Ukraine	Slovenia	6–2	France
2026 Details	(Spain) San Lorenzo de El Escorial	Sweden	6–2	Latvia	Germany	7–6	Switzerland
2027 Details	(Spain) San Lorenzo de El Escorial	-	-	-	-	-	-

=== Medal table ===
Rank	Country	Gold	Silver	Bronze	Medals
1	Latvia	1	1	0	2
1	Sweden	1	1	0	2
3	Switzerland	1	0	0	1
4	Ukraine	0	1	0	1
5	Germany	0	0	1	1
5	Slovenia	0	0	1	1
Total		3	3	2	8

=== Participation details ===
Team	(Finland) 2024	(Switzerland) 2025	(Spain) 2026	Total
Austria	–	Y	12	2
Brazil	–	–	25	1
Burkina Faso	Y	–	–	1
Cameroon	–	–	21	1
Canada	–	Y	20	2
China	–	–	23	1
Colombia	–	Y	27	2
Côte d'Ivoire	Y	–	28	2
Czechia	Y	Y	10	3
Estonia	Y	–	16	2
Finland	Y	Y	5	3
France	Y	4	15	3
Germany	Y	Y	3	3
Hong Kong	–	Y	26	2
Hungary	Y	Y	7	3
Iceland	Y	Y	9	3
Italy	Y	Y	13	3
Latvia	1	Y	2	3
Netherlands	Y	Y	24	3
New Zealand	Y	Y	–	2
Poland	Y	Y	17	3
Singapore	–	–	18	2
Slovakia	Y	Y	8	3
Slovenia	–	3	–	1
Solomon Islands	–	–	22	1
Spain	Y	Y	6	3
Sweden	2	Y	1	3
Switzerland	Y	1	4	3
Thailand	–	Y	11	2
Ukraine	Y	2	14	3
United States	Y	Y	19	3

== Women's 3v3 World Championships ==
Year	Final venue	Winners	Score	Runners-up	Third place	Score	Fourth place
2024 Details	(Finland) Lahti	Finland	4–3 (AET)	Sweden	-	-	-
2025 Details	(Switzerland) Winterthur	Switzerland	4–3 (AET)	Finland	Sweden	4–3	Czech Republic
2026 Details	(Spain) San Lorenzo de El Escorial	Sweden	7–1	Switzerland	Latvia	6–3	Finland
2027 Details	(Spain) San Lorenzo de El Escorial	-	-	-	-	-	-

=== Medal table ===
Rank	Country	Gold	Silver	Bronze	Medals
1	Sweden	1	1	1	3
2	Finland	1	1	0	2
2	Switzerland	1	1	0	2
4	Latvia	0	0	1	1
Total		3	3	2	8

=== Participation details ===
Team	(Finland) 2024	(Switzerland) 2025	(Spain) 2026	Total
Austria	–	Y	21	2
Canada	–	Y	–	1
Czechia	Y	4	14	3
Estonia	Y	–	5	2
Finland	1	2	4	3
France	–	Y	16	2
Germany	Y	Y	15	3
Great Britain	–	Y	–	1
Hong Kong	–	Y	19	2
Hungary	–	Y	12	2
Iceland	Y	Y	17	3
Italy	–	Y	9	2
Latvia	Y	Y	3	3
Netherlands	Y	Y	20	3
Poland	Y	Y	7	3
Singapore	–	–	10	1
Slovakia	Y	Y	11	3
Spain	–	–	8	1
Sweden	2	3	1	3
Switzerland	Y	1	2	3
Thailand	–	–	6	1
Ukraine	Y	Y	13	3
United States	–	–	18	1

== See also ==
- List of floorball world champions
- Men's World Floorball Championship
- Women's World Floorball Championship

–
