= United States Floorball Association =

Highest governing body for floorball in the USA

United States Floorball Association USFbA
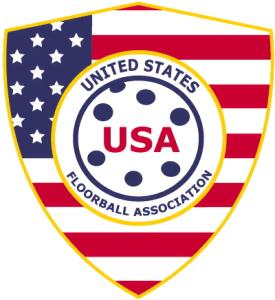
- IOC nation: USA
- Sport: Floorball
- Official website: www.usafloorball.org

History
- Year of formation: 2001

Affiliations
- International federation: International Floorball Federation (IFF)
- IFF members page: 2001
- National Olympic Committee: United States Olympic & Paralympic Committee

Elected
- President: Brian Radichel

The United States Floorball Association (USFbA) is the highest governing body for floorball in the United States of America. The USFbA is a self-governed organization, recognized by both state and federal governments. It is based in Grand Prairie, TX.

== Organization ==
The USFbA is divided into 14 regional branches. Each regional branch has a director who is in charge of floorball for that region.

The USFbA has been a member of the International Floorball Federation (IFF) since 1993. As of June 30, 2008, there are 920 registered floorball players in the US, which is one-and-a-half times the total of registered players in 2007.

=== Central Board ===
The current central board consists of a president, treasurer, and secretary.

Position	Name
President	Brian Radichel
Treasurer	Darryl Gross
Secretary	Bryan Bagley

== History ==
The sport of floorball was initially introduced in the United States by Scandinavian players who brought the game with them when traveling to the United States. In 1991, Swedish players in Boston formed a floorball club at MIT. The sport soon grew in popularity and reached several universities, where it was also played at the club level.

The first step towards membership with the International Floorball Federation (IFF) was taken in the mid-90s, when floorball found new ground in California. After founding the USFbA, the organization attempted to gather and send a national team to the 1998 World Floorball Championships, but fell short due to a lack of players. In 2002, the USFbA succeeded in gathering a team and the United States was able to field their first national team. This team consisted of players based in various countries, such as Finland, Norway, Sweden, and Switzerland but also contained US based players such as former USFbA president Calle Karlsson.

In 2009, the USFbA moved their central headquarters from Raleigh, North Carolina, to Fresno, California. They later moved to Incline Village, Nevada, and then to Grand Prairie, Texas.

== Players ==
Players in the USA must register with USFbA's Amateur Athletic Union (AAU) insurance policy before taking part in any nationally sanctioned tournaments or competitions. Through this partnership, the development of floorball locally is expected to grow much more securely thanks to improved protection.

=== National teams ===
Although their first appearance was in 2002, the US national team has had considerable success at the World Floorball Championships, finishing as high as third place in the B-Division of the 2008 Men's World Floorball Championships.

The women's first appearance was in 2003.
