= 2023 Men's U-19 World Floorball Championships =

Floorball competition

Tournament details
- Host country: Denmark
- Venues: 2 (in 1 host city)
- Dates: 26–30 April
- Teams: 16

Final positions
- Champions: Sweden (6th title)
- Runners-up: Switzerland
- Third place: Finland
- Fourth place: Czech Republic

Tournament statistics
- Matches played: 36
- Attendance: 18,316 (509 per match)

The 2023 Men's U-19 World Floorball Championships was the 12th edition of the championship. The tournament was played in Frederikshavn, Denmark, and took place from 26 to 30 April. Czech Republic were the two-time defending champions, but were beaten by Switzerland in the semifinals. Sweden won their sixth title after triumphing over the Swiss in the final.

This tournament broke the record for the most attended U-19 Floorball World Championship ever, with 18,316 spectators watching the games.

== Bidding process ==
- Denmark
- Slovakia

Denmark's bid was deemed superior and were given the hosting rights on 23 February 2021.

== Qualified teams ==
29 teams entered, although this would be reduced to 25. The top nine from the last edition qualified directly, while qualifiers took place in Asia, Americas and Europe for the last seven tickets. This tournament saw the debut of Australia, Singapore and United States.

Host nation Team qualified directly Team qualified Team failed to qualify Did not enter

	Date	Venue	Vacancies	Qualified
Automatically qualified from 2021		(Czech Republic) Brno	9	Czech Republic; Finland; Sweden; Switzerland; Latvia; Germany; Slovakia; Poland; Denmark (H)
European qualifier 1	24–28 January 2023	(Austria) Salzburg	2	Norway; Austria
European qualifier 2	24–28 January 2023	(Spain) El Escorial	2	Estonia; Slovenia
Asian-Oceanian qualification	29 September–1 October 2022	(New Zealand) Wellington	2	Australia; Singapore
Americas qualification	2–3 September 2022	(United States) Draper	1	United States
Total			16	

== Venues ==
The venues for the tournament are in Frederikshavn at Arena Nord.

Frederikshavn	2023 Men's U-19 World Floorball Championships is located in Denmark
Arena Nord; Capacity: 2,700 (in total) (Note: Arena Nord used two arenas during the tournament. Arena A has a capacity of 2,100, while Arena B has a capacity of 600.)	2023 Men's U-19 World Floorball Championships is located in Denmark

== Draw ==
The draw took place on 13 December 2022 in Næstved, Denmark at 11:00 CET. The European qualifiers were not known at the time and ranking between the four qualifiers would decide who would take each place.

Pot 1	Pot 2	Pot 3	Pot 4
Czech Republic (1); Finland (2); Sweden (3); Switzerland (4)	Latvia (5); Germany (6); Slovakia (7); Poland (8)	Denmark (9) (H) (N/A) European qualifier (8) (Note: The eventual team in this slot was Norway.) (N/A) European qualifier (10) (Note: The eventual team in this slot was Estonia.) (N/A) European qualifier (11) (Note: The eventual team in this slot was Slovenia.)	(N/A) European qualifier (12) (Note: The eventual team in this slot was Austria.); United States (14); Australia (20); Singapore (27)

== Preliminary round ==
The schedule was announced on 30 January 2023.

=== Group A ===
Pos	Team	Pld	W	D	L	GF	GA	GD	Pts	Qualification
1	Czech Republic	3	3	0	0	29	9	+20	6	Semifinals
2	Finland	3	2	0	1	26	9	+17	4	Semifinals
3	Latvia	3	1	0	2	17	8	+9	2	5th place game
4	Poland	3	0	0	3	3	49	−46	0	Quarterfinal 1

Source: IFF
Rules for classification: 1) points; 2) head-to-head points; 3) head-to-head goal difference;

26 April 2023; 10:30	Poland	2–18 (1–7, 1–7, 0–4)	Czech Republic	Arena Nord Arena B Attendance: 185

Report

26 April 2023; 13:30	Latvia	2–3 (1–0, 0–2, 1–1)	Finland	Arena Nord Arena B Attendance: 297

Report

27 April 2023; 13:00	Czech Republic	7–5 (3–1, 0–2, 4–2)	Finland	Arena Nord Arena A Attendance: 721

Report

27 April 2023; 16:30	Poland	1–13 (0–7, 0–4, 1–2)	Latvia	Arena Nord Arena B Attendance: 129

Report

28 April 2023; 10:00	Czech Republic	4–2 (0–0, 2–1, 2–1)	Latvia	Arena Nord Arena A Attendance: 448

Report

28 April 2023; 13:00	Finland	18–0 (7–0, 8–0, 3–0)	Poland	Arena Nord Arena A Attendance: 250

Report

=== Group B ===
Pos	Team	Pld	W	D	L	GF	GA	GD	Pts	Qualification
1	Sweden	3	3	0	0	41	9	+32	6	Semifinals
2	Switzerland	3	2	0	1	28	12	+16	4	Semifinals
3	Slovakia	3	0	1	2	10	34	−24	1 (Note: Slovakia 6–6 Germany)	5th place game
4	Germany	3	0	1	2	8	32	−24	1	Quarterfinal 1

Source: IFF
Rules for classification: 1) points; 2) head-to-head points; 3) head-to-head goal difference;
Notes:

26 April 2023; 16:00	Slovakia	2–19 (0–5, 0–7, 2–7)	Sweden	Arena Nord Arena A Attendance: 378

Report

26 April 2023; 16:30	Germany	1–13 (1–3, 0–6, 0–4)	Switzerland	Arena Nord Arena B Attendance: 117

Report

27 April 2023; 10:00	Slovakia	6–6 (2–2, 1–2, 3–2)	Germany	Arena Nord Arena A Attendance: 390

Report

27 April 2023; 16:00	Sweden	9–6 (3–1, 1–3, 5–2)	Switzerland	Arena Nord Arena A Attendance: 759

Report

28 April 2023; 16:00	Switzerland	9–2 (1–2, 7–0, 1–0)	Slovakia	Arena Nord Arena A Attendance: 378

Report

28 April 2023; 16:30	Sweden	13–1 (4–0, 4–1, 5–0)	Germany	Arena Nord Arena B Attendance: 364

Report

=== Group C ===
Pos	Team	Pld	W	D	L	GF	GA	GD	Pts	Qualification
1	Denmark (H)	3	2	1	0	27	6	+21	5	Quarterfinal 1
2	Austria	3	2	0	1	19	21	−2	4	11th place game
3	Estonia	3	1	1	1	24	16	+8	3	13th place game
4	United States	3	0	0	3	8	35	−27	0	15th place game

Source: IFF
Rules for classification: 1) points; 2) head-to-head points; 3) head-to-head goal difference;
(H) Hosts

26 April 2023; 19:00	Denmark	14–1 (3–0, 7–0, 4–1)	United States	Arena Nord Arena A Attendance: 536

Report

26 April 2023; 19:30	Austria	10–7 (3–2, 5–3, 2–2)	Estonia	Arena Nord Arena B Attendance: 123

Report

27 April 2023; 19:00	Austria	0–8 (0–2, 0–5, 0–1)	Denmark	Arena Nord Arena A Attendance: 548

Report

27 April 2023; 19:30	Estonia	12–1 (5–0, 4–0, 3–1)	United States	Arena Nord Arena B Attendance: 132

Report

28 April 2023; 19:00	Estonia	5–5 (0–3, 2–0, 3–2)	Denmark	Arena Nord Arena A Attendance: 719

Report

28 April 2023; 19:30	United States	6–9 (2–2, 1–7, 3–0)	Austria	Arena Nord Arena B Attendance: 197

Report

=== Group D ===
Pos	Team	Pld	W	D	L	GF	GA	GD	Pts	Qualification
1	Norway	3	3	0	0	41	8	+33	6	Quarterfinal 1
2	Slovenia	3	1	0	2	27	26	+1	2 (Note: Slovenia +4, Australia +1, Singapore –5)	11th place game
3	Australia	3	1	0	2	19	33	−14	2	13th place game
4	Singapore	3	1	0	2	13	33	−20	2	15th place game

Source: IFF
Rules for classification: 1) points; 2) head-to-head points; 3) head-to-head goal difference;
Notes:

26 April 2023; 10:00	Australia	13–7 (3–2, 3–2, 7–3)	Slovenia	Arena Nord Arena A Attendance: 375

Report

26 April 2023; 13:00	Singapore	0–15 (0–8, 0–3, 0–4)	Norway	Arena Nord Arena A Attendance: 383

Report

27 April 2023; 10:30	Australia	4–9 (1–3, 1–4, 2–2)	Singapore	Arena Nord Arena B Attendance: 273

Report

27 April 2023; 13:30	Slovenia	6–9 (1–2, 4–3, 1–4)	Norway	Arena Nord Arena B Attendance: 325

Report

28 April 2023; 10:30	Slovenia	14–4 (6–0, 5–2, 3–2)	Singapore	Arena Nord Arena B Attendance: 123

Report

28 April 2023; 13:30	Norway	17–2 (4–1, 7–0, 6–1)	Australia	Arena Nord Arena B Attendance: 313

Report

== Placement round ==
=== 15th place game ===
15th place game
April 29
United States	5
Singapore	12

==== C4 vs D4 ====
29 April 2023; 10:30	United States	5–12 (2–4, 0–1, 3–7)	Singapore	Arena Nord Arena B Attendance: 205

Report

=== 13th place game ===
13th place game
April 29
Australia	2
Estonia	10

==== C3 vs D3 ====
29 April 2023; 13:30	Australia	2–10 (1–4, 1–3, 0–3)	Estonia	Arena Nord Arena B Attendance: 127

Report

=== 11th place game ===
11th place game
April 29
Austria	1
Slovenia	4

==== C2 vs D2 ====
29 April 2023; 16:30	Austria	1–4 (0–1, 0–1, 1–2)	Slovenia	Arena Nord Arena B Attendance: 103

Report

=== Bracket ===
7th–10th semifinals
29 April
Poland	2
Norway	8
29 April
Germany	3
Denmark	4

7th place
30 April
Norway	10
Denmark	4
9th place
30 April
Poland	1
Germany	15

==== A4 vs D1 ====
29 April 2023; 19:30	Poland	2–8 (0–1, 2–6, 0–1)	Norway	Arena Nord Arena B Attendance: 135

Report

==== B4 vs C1 ====
29 April 2023; 19:00	Germany	3–4 (1–1, 1–1, 1–2)	Denmark	Arena Nord Arena A Attendance: 987

Report

=== 9th place game ===
==== LPO1 vs LPO2 ====
30 April 2023; 10:00	Poland	1–15 (0–4, 1–6, 0–5)	Germany	Arena Nord Arena A Attendance: 137

Report

=== 7th place game ===
==== WPO1 vs WPO2 ====
30 April 2023; 10:30	Norway	10–4 (1–2, 6–1, 3–1)	Denmark	Arena Nord Arena B Attendance: 420

Report

=== 5th place game ===
5th place game
April 29
Latvia	6
Slovakia	1

==== A3 vs B3 ====
29 April 2023; 10:30	Latvia	6–1 (1–0, 1–1, 4–0)	Slovakia	Arena Nord Arena A Attendance: 356

Report

== Knockout stage ==
=== Bracket ===
Semifinals
29 April
Czech Republic	2
Switzerland	7
29 April
Sweden	12
Finland	10

Final
30 April
Switzerland	4
Sweden	7
Third place
30 April
Czech Republic	6
Finland	7 (SO)

=== Semifinals ===
==== A1 vs B2 ====
29 April 2023; 13:00	Czech Republic	2–7 (0–1, 2–1, 0–5)	Switzerland	Arena Nord Arena A Attendance: 1,725

Report

==== B1 vs A2 ====
29 April 2023; 16:00	Sweden	12–10 (3–0, 2–2, 7–8)	Finland	Arena Nord Arena A Attendance: 1,750

Report

=== Bronze medal game ===
30 April 2023; 13:00	Czech Republic	6–7 (3–1, 1–4, 2–1, 0–0); SO: 4–5	Finland	Arena Nord Arena A Attendance: 1,890

Report

=== Gold medal game ===
30 April 2023; 16:00	Switzerland	4–7 (1–1, 1–1, 2–5)	Sweden	Arena Nord Arena A Attendance: 2,011

Report

== Final standings ==
Gold medal	Sweden
Silver medal	Switzerland
Bronze medal	Finland
4	Czech Republic
5	Latvia
6	Slovakia
7	Norway
8	Denmark
9	Germany
10	Poland
11	Slovenia
12	Austria
13	Estonia
14	Australia
15	Singapore
16	United States

== Awards ==
=== Team of the tournament ===
- (Switzerland) Mathias Juon (Goalkeeper)
- (Sweden) Jonathan Berglund (Defender)
- (Switzerland) Pascal Schmuki (Defender)
- (Switzerland) David Hermle (Centre)
- (Sweden) Gabriel Kohonen (Forward)
- (Sweden) Sakarias Ulriksson (Forward)

== Preparations ==
For the tournament, the city of Frederikshavn and Sport Event Denmark gave 125,000 Euros.

Applications for volunteering was opened in October 2022.

The budget for the tournament were 217,600 Euros. Although this would increase to 260,000. To break even, they needed to earn up to 66,000 Euros in ticket sales. They ended up exceeding the target and reached 90,000 Euros.

== Marketing ==
Ticket sales and packages started to be put on sale on 20 October 2022. 2,500 tickets and packages were sold before the tournament.
