= Singapore Floorball Association =

Governing body of floorball in Singapore

- IOC nation: SGP
- Sport: Floorball

History
- Year of formation: 1995

Affiliations
- International federation: International Floorball Federation (IFF)
- IFF member since: 1995
- Continental association: Asia Oceania Floorball Confederation
- National Olympic Committee: Singapore National Olympic Council

Elected
- President: Kenneth Ho

The Singapore Floorball Association (SFA) is the governing body of floorball in Singapore. The SFA was established in 1995 and became a member of the International Floorball Federation in the same year.

== Competitions organised ==
- Singapore Floorball League
  - Men
    - Division 1
    - Division 2
    - Conference
  - Women
    - Division 1
    - Division 2
    - Division 3
- Pesta Sukan Floorball Cup
- National Floorball Challenge

== School tournaments ==
- Primary Schools (Junior and Senior)
- 'C' Division Boys and Girls
- 'B' Division Boys and Girls
- 'A' Division Boys and Girls
- IVP
- POL-ITE
