= Komarudin =

Korean-born Indonesian freedom fighter (1919–1949)

- 고마르딘
- Born: Yang Chil-seong; May 29, 1919; Wanju County, North Jeolla Province Korea, Empire of Japan
- Died: August 10, 1949 (aged 30); Garut (In area of Kerkhoff), Indonesia
- Cause of death: Executed by Dutch forces
- Burial place: Taman Makam Pahlawan, Tenjolya, Garut, Indonesia
- Years active: 1942–1949
- Known for: First Korean-born Indonesian freedom fighter

- Komarudin
- Hangul: 양칠성
- Hanja: 梁七星
- RR: Yang Chilseong
- MR: Yang Ch'ilsŏng

Komarudin (29 May 1919 – 10 August 1949) was an Indonesian freedom fighter during the skirmishes against the Dutch which took place shortly after World War 2. It has since come to light that he was born in Korea. His real name is Yang Chil-seong (양칠성). His Japanese name is Sichisei Yanagawa (梁川七星). He was caught and executed in 1949 by Dutch forces. In July 1995, the Indonesian government and South Korean representatives held a tombstone replacement ceremony in his honor.

== Early life ==
Yang Chil-seong was born on 29 May 1919 in Wanju County, North Jeolla Province. He was commissioned by the Japanese colonial government as a guardian of allied forces in Bandung in 1942. At that time both Korea and Indonesia were being colonized by Japan. After Indonesia and Korea gained independence in 1945, Yang Chil-seong did not return to Korea but remained in Indonesia. He changed his name to Komarudin and married an Indonesian. When the Dutch soldiers returned to Indonesia and launched military aggression, Komarudin came to Garut with two Japanese soldiers from Bandung, joining the Indonesian National Armed Forces. They fought guerrilla warfare in a group dubbed "Pasukan Pangeran Papak", from Markas Besar Gerilya Galunggung (MBGG). They were led by Major Kosasih and based in Wanaraja, Garut. The two Japanese soldiers named Hasegawa (Abubakar) and Masahiro Aoki (Usman) along with Komarudin were known for their good combat skills. The troops also fought in the event of Bandung Sea of Fire. Komarudin thwarted the Dutch attempt to seize Wanaraja by destroying Cimanuk Bridge.

== Capture by Dutch soldiers ==
When the Dutch attacked Garut, a group of Prince Papak troops were in charge of securing the area, but because the Dutch forces were too big, the Prince Papak troops were forced to retreat. The three guerrillas were hiding but were caught from information by spies. Komarudin, Abubakar, Usman and an Indonesian fighter named Djoehana were caught on Mount Dora. On 10 August 1949, Komarudin, Abubakar and Usman were executed in Kerkhoff, Garut. Djoehana was sentenced to life imprisonment in Cipinang Penitentiary Institution. They were buried in TPU Pasir, Bogor, then in 1975 transferred to the Heroes Cemetery of Tenjolaya, Garut. Komarudin died and left a boy.

== Identity disclosure ==
Previously there was little information about Yang Chil-seong's life in Indonesia. The information about Komarudin, who turned out to be a Korean, was revealed by Japanese and South Korean historians. In addition, testimony was also obtained from fellow comrades of Yang Chil-seong, who were still alive. In July 1995, the Indonesian government and South Korean representatives held a Komarudin tombstone replacement ceremony militarily. Since then Komarudin has been regarded as one of the leading figures for Indonesia's independence.
