= Asia Oceania Floorball Confederation =

Floorball confederation

- Abbreviation: AOFC
- Formation: 2005
- Type: Sport organisation
- Headquarters: Bangkok, Thailand
- Region served: Asia and Oceania
- Members: 20
- President: (Thailand) Chaiyapak Siriwat
- Senior Vice President: (Singapore) Ben Ow
- General Secretary: (Thailand) Penthai Siriwat
- Parent organization: International Floorball Federation
- Website: www.asiaoceaniafloorballconfederation.org

The Asia Oceania Floorball Confederation (AOFC) is a floorball confederation consisting of 20 nations spanning across two continents, Asia and Oceania.

The AOFC organizes the men's and women's Asia Pacific Floorball Championship every year.

== History ==
The AOFC was formed during the 2005 Women's World Floorball Championships, when the national associations of Australia, India, Japan, Korea, Malaysia, Pakistan, and Singapore, alongside the International Floorball Federation, decided to form a Confederation in conjunction with the 2004 Asia Pacific Floorball Championships.

In 2017, the regional headquarter office moved to Bangkok, Thailand.

== Organization ==
Like other member nations of the International Floorball Federation (IFF), the AOFC has a central board composed of a President, Vice President, Treasurer, Secretary General, and regional representatives.

The most recent AOFC General Assembly Meeting was held both online via Zoom and in person at The Grand Fourwings Convention Hotel. Ten members attended in person, while five joined online. Korea abstained, and five members chose not to attend. During this General Assembly, elections for the Central Board and other committees were also conducted, with voting carried out online.

=== Central Board (2025–2028) ===
Position	Name
President	(Thailand) Chaiyapak Siriwat
Senior Vice-president	(Singapore) Ben Ow
Vice-presidents	(Thailand) Graivut Vattanatham (Philippines) Ralph Ramos (South Korea) Kim Hwang-joo (China) Yuan Yong
Treasurer	(Thailand) Parawan Yoochoochai
Secretary General	(Thailand) Penthai Siriwat
Vice Secretary General	(New Zealand) Anna Kibblewhite (Singapore) Kenneth Ho
West Envoy Chair	(Iran) Davalo Ramezanali
Members	(India) Harinder Kumar (Indonesia) Anton Komaini (Singapore) Ryan Quek (Iran) Mohammadamin Davalou (South Korea) Gum Sung Kang (Thailand) Pakkamol Siriwat (China) Yuan Yong (Malaysia) Taquiddin Izzat (Australia) Stephen King (Pakistan) Asim G. Kiyani (Macau) Lai Ning Willy (Hong Kong) Law Pui Ki (Solomon Islands) Adam Olofsson (Kazakhstan) Maxim Golubev (Mongolia) Ch. Baasandavaa

=== Committees ===
Committee	List of members
Referee Development Committee	(Singapore) Sharil Ismail (Singapore) Oswind Rosayro (South Korea) Young June Lee (Philippines) Massada Dem Cabillas (Malaysia) Jaey Jetpuria (Australia) Peter Harris (Indonesia) Rameli (Indonesia) Yongky Dwi Adi
Asian Sports Game Committee	(India) Pradeep Singh (Singapore) Glendon Phua (South Korea) Hwang Joo Kim (Thailand) Wilers Smabut (Thailand) Wilawan Tangsritakul (Australia) Kyle Lister
Competition Committee	(Indonesia) Julfikar Setiadi (Indonesia) Nuridin Widya Pranoto (Singapore) Arif Azfar (South Korea) Gum Sung Kang (Thailand) Atinart Payajakrit (Thailand) Ratee Thesthong (Philippines) Ralph Ramos (New Zealand) Anna Kibblewhite (Australia) Kyle Lister (Iran) Mohammadamin Davalou
New Members Committee	(Indonesia) Alimuddin (Australia) Stephen King (Thailand) Bootsarin Vimolset
Athletes Commission	(India) Sangeeta Rathi (Indonesia) Ardo Okilanda (Thailand) Surapong Sangmongkhol (New Zealand) Angus Stallmann (Australia) Shannon Barnes (Thailand) Veerasak Pimpa
Youth Development Committee	(Philippines) Jay-r Beterbo (Solomon Islands) Hendrick Bong (Australia) Vanessa Austin (Thailand) Paron Siriwat (Thailand) Watcharapon Onsuk

== Nations ==
The AOFC currently consists of 20 member associations:

Country or territory	Member association	Founded	Website
Australia	Australian Floorball Association	1996	www.floorballaustralia.org.au
China	China Floorball Union	2016	
Macau	Macau China Floorball General Association	2019	
Hong Kong	Floorball Federation of Hong Kong	2016	
India	Indian Floorball Federation	2001	floorballindia.com
Indonesia	Indonesian Floorball Association	2009	
Iran	Iran Floorball Association	2008	ifsafed.com/ifa/
Japan	Japan Floorball Association	1983	www.floorball.jp
Kazakhstan	Kazakhstan National Floorball Federation		
Kiribati	Kiribati Floorball National Association	2019	
South Korea	Korea Floorball Federation	2004	www.floorball.or.kr
Kuwait	Kuwait Floorball Committee	2019	
Malaysia	Malaysian Floorball Association	2001	floorballmalaysia.com
Mongolia	Mongolian Floorball Federation	2005	
New Zealand	Floorball New Zealand	2001	www.floorball.org.nz
Pakistan	Pakistan Floorball Federation	2019	
Philippines	Floorball Philippines	2011	floorball.ph
Singapore	Singapore Floorball Association	1995	www.revolutionise.sg/sgfloorball/
Solomon Islands	Solomon Islands Floorball Federation		
Thailand	Thai Floorball Federation	2007	

=== Development ===
1. Bangladesh
2. Jordan
3. Nepal
4. Qatar
5. Sri Lanka
6. United Arab Emirates

== See also ==
- World Floorball Championships
- Asia Pacific Floorball Championship
- Asia-Oceania Floorball Cup
