= International Floorball Federation =

Sports governing body

- IFF official logo
- Abbreviation: IFF
- Formation: April 12, 1986; 40 years ago
- Founded at: Huskvarna, Sweden
- Type: Sports federation
- Legal status: Governing body of Floorball
- Headquarters: Helsinki, Finland
- Region served: Worldwide
- Members: 81 national associations (2026)
- President: Filip Šuman
- Main organ: Congress
- Affiliations: ARISF, GAISF, IWGA
- Website: floorball.sport

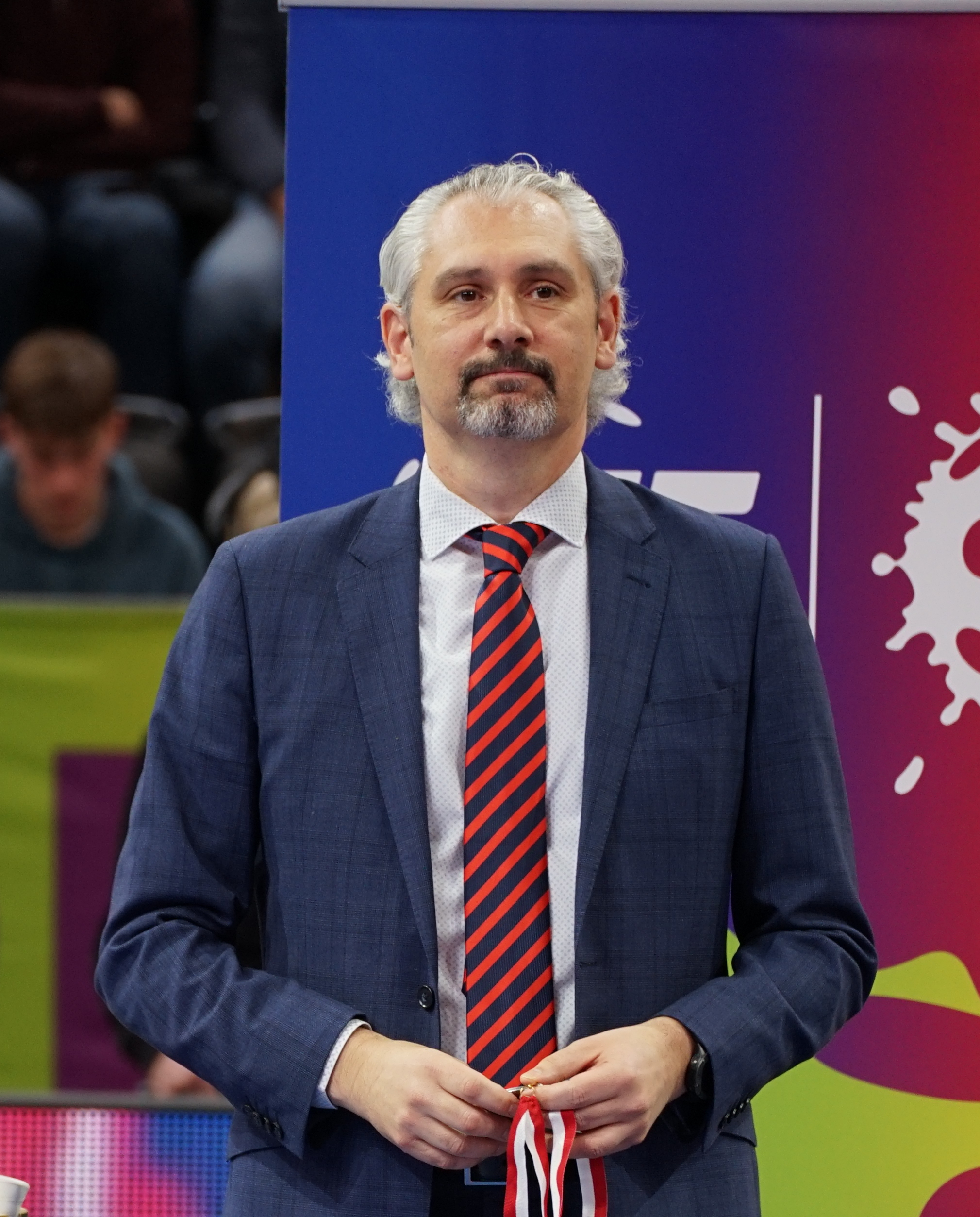
The president of the federation, Filip Šuman

The International Floorball Federation (IFF) is the worldwide governing body for the sport of floorball. It was founded on 12 April 1986 in Huskvarna, Sweden, by representatives from the national floorball associations of Finland, Sweden and Switzerland. It is based in Helsinki, Finland. The president of the federation is Filip Šuman.

In 2000 the federation became a member of Global Association of International Sports Federations (GAISF, SportAccord since in 2023). It is recognized by the IOC and has been an ordinary member of the ARISF since 2008, and of International World Games Association (IWGA) since 2013.

== Events ==
The first major event organized by the International Floorball Federation was the European Cup in 1993, which has been held annually ever since, currently under the name Champions Cup, and is contested by the top teams from national floorball leagues.

The first Men's Floorball European Championships was played in 1994 in Finland. A year later, the tournament was renamed the Open European Championships due to the participation of Japan, and it also included the inaugural women's championship. In 1996, the tournament was replaced by the World Floorball Championships, which are held in even-numbered years for men and odd-numbered years for women. The first Men's Under-19 World Championships took place in 2001. The Women's Under-19 World Championships were established in 2004.

Additionally, the IFF organized the World University Floorball Championships, with the first edition taking place in 2002 and the final one in 2018.

=== Global ===
- Men's World Floorball Championship
- Women's World Floorball Championship
- Under-19 World Floorball Championships
- Champions Cup
- Floorball at the World Games
- 3v3 World Floorball Championship
- World University Floorball Championships (defunct)

=== Regional ===
- Floorball European Championships
- Asia-Oceania Floorball Cup
- Asia Pacific Floorball Championship
- Floorball at the SEA Games
- Southeast Asian Floorball Championships

== Development programmes ==
The International Floorball Federation operates development programmes to support national associations and promote floorball in countries where the sport is still emerging. Its Development Programme, launched in 2005, provides seminars covering three areas: organisational administration, coaching and refereeing. Member associations can apply to host these seminars as part of their efforts to develop the sport at national level.

The federation also supports initiatives aimed at increasing participation and access to equipment. These include GoGirls! Floorball, which promotes participation among girls and women, and Stick with it!, an equipment recycling campaign that collects and redistributes used floorball equipment. The IFF also operates the Fit4Future programme, which provides national associations with support for developing their management and organisational structures.

== Medals ==
As of 1 August 2025 (after 53 events)

=== Events ===
- Men's World Floorball Championship (1996–2024) – 15 editions
- Women's World Floorball Championship (1997–2023) – 14 editions
- Men's Under-19 World Floorball Championships (2001–2025) – 13 editions
- Women's Under-19 World Floorball Championships (2004–2024) – 11 editions

=== Ranking ===
Rank	Nation	Gold	Silver	Bronze	Total
1	Sweden (SWE)	35	12	4	51
2	Finland (FIN)	14	26	13	53
3	Switzerland (SUI)	2	10	19	31
4	Czech Republic (CZE)	2	5	14	21
5	Norway (NOR)	0	0	3	3
Totals (5 entries)		53	53	53	159

== Partnership with international organisations ==
- International Olympic Committee
- SportAccord
- World Anti-Doping Agency
- International World Games Association
- International University Sports Federation
- International School Sport Federation
- International Masters Games Association
- World Abilitysport (IPCH / ICEWH – International Committee of Electric Wheelchair Hockey)
- Special Olympics

== Members ==
The map of IFF members. Dark-green are ordinary members, light-green are provisional members

This is a list of International Floorball Federation member nations. It includes associations, committees, confederations, federations, and unions.

There are currently 81 IFF members (45 ordinary members and 36 provisional members in June 2024). The newest member is Laos, which was admitted in 2025.

=== Members by Regions ===
As of 11 September 2026

Region	Members		
Region	Ordinary	Provisional	Total
Africa	1	14	15
Asia-Oceania	13	10	23
Europe	27	7	34
Americas	4	5	9
World	45	36	81

=== Ordinary members ===
Flag	Member name	Founded in	IFF member	Website
(Australia)	Australian Floorball Association	1996	1996	www.floorballaustralia.org.au/
(Austria)	Austrian Floorball Association	1996	1997	www.floorball.at
(Belarus)	Floorball Federation of Belarus (suspended)^{7}	2009	2009	
(Belgium)	Belgian Floorball Federation	1995	1995	www.floorballbelgium.be
(Brazil)	Brazilian Floorball Association	1998	1999	floorball.com.br
(Canada)	Floorball Canada	2001	2001	www.floorballcanada.org
(China)	China Floorball Federation	2016	2016	
(Ivory Coast)	Cote d´Ivoire Floorball Federation	2014	2015	
(Czech Republic)	Czech Floorball	1992	1993	www.ceskyflorbal.cz
(Denmark)	Danish Floorball Federation	1989	1991	floorball.dk
(Estonia)	Estonian Floorball Union	1993	1994	www.saalihoki.ee
(Finland)	Finnish Floorball Federation	1985	1986	salibandy.fi
(France)	French Floorball Federation	2002	2003	www.floorball.fr
(Georgia (country))	Georgian Floorball Association	2002	2002	
(Germany)	German Floorball Association	1992	1994	floorball.de
(Hungary)	Hungarian Floorball Federation^{1}	1989	1992	hunfloorball.hu
(Iceland)	Icelandic Floorball Committee^{2}	2005	2005	
(India)	Indian Floorball Federation	2001	2002	floorballindia.com
(Indonesia)	Indonesian Floorball Association	2009	2009	
(Iran)	Floorball Association of Iran^{3}	2008	2009	ifsafed.com
(Israel)	Israeli Floorball Association	2007	2007	
(Italy)	Italian Unihockey and Floorball Association	2000	2001	www.fiuf.it
(Jamaica)	Jamaica Floorball Association		2007	www.floorballjamaica.org
(Japan)	Japan Floorball Association	1983	1994	www.floorball.jp
(South Korea)	Korea Floorball Federation	2004	2005	www.floorball.or.kr
(Latvia)	Latvian Floorball Union	1993	1994	www.floorball.lv
(Liechtenstein)	Liechtenstein Floorball Association^{4}	1987	2005	www.unihockey.li
(Malaysia)	Malaysian Floorball Association	2001	2002	floorballmalaysia.com
(Netherlands)	Netherlands Floorball and Unihockey Association	1999	1999	nefub.nl
(New Zealand)	Floorball New Zealand	2009	2009	www.floorball.org.nz
(Norway)	Norwegian Floorball Federation^{5}	1991	1992	bandyforbundet.no
(Philippines)	Philippine Floorball Association	2011	2011	
(Poland)	Polish Floorball Federation	1995	1999	www.polskiunihokej.pl
(Russia)	Russian Floorball Federation (suspended)^{7}	1992	1993	нффр.рф
(Serbia)	Serbian Floorball Association	2007	2007	
(Singapore)	Singapore Floorball Association	1995	1995	www.revolutionise.sg/sgfloorball
(Slovakia)	Slovak Floorball Association	1998	1999	www.szfb.sk
(Slovenia)	Slovenian Floorball Association	2000	2001	floorballslo.si
(Spain)	Spanish Unihockey and Floorball Association	1998	2001	www.floorball.es
(Sweden)	Swedish Floorball Federation	1981	1986	www.innebandy.se
(Switzerland)	Swiss Unihockey	1985	1986	www.swissunihockey.ch
(Thailand)	Thai Floorball Federation	2007	2007	
(Ukraine)	Ukraine Floorball Federation	2004	2005	
(United Kingdom)	United Kingdom Floorball Federation^{6}	1995	2009	ukff.org
(United States)	United States Floorball Association	2001	2001	www.usafloorball.org

IFF founded

- ^{1} The Hungarian Floorball Federation was originally established in 1989, but reorganized into a new organization in 1997.
- ^{2} The Icelandic Floorball Committee is a division of the Icelandic National Olympic Committee, and therefore governed by it.
- ^{3} The Floorball Association of Iran is a division of the Iran Federation of Sport Associations, and therefore governed by it.
- ^{4} The Liechtenstein Floorball Association was established as a single floorball club, UHC Schaan.
- ^{5} The Norwegian Floorball Federation is a division of the Norway's Bandy Association, and therefore governed by it.
- ^{6} The Great Britain Floorball & Unihockey Association was the originating governing body representing floorball within Great Britain, before being replaced by the United Kingdom Floorball Federation in 2012.
- ^{7} In 1 March 2022, as a reaction in response to the 2022 Russian invasion of Ukraine, both National Floorball Federation of Russia (NFFR) and Floorball Federation of Belarus are suspended from international Floorball activities. In addition, no floorball events may organise in both countries, and no representatives, include athletes and players, may participant all kind of IFF Competitions, events or meetings until future notice.

=== Provisional members ===
Flag	Member name	Founded in	Member	Website
(Argentina)	Argentinian Floorball Association	2007	2007	
(Armenia)	Armenian Floorball Federation	1999	2006	
(Benin)	Benin Floorball Association	2024	2024	
(Burkina Faso)	Burkina Faso Floorball Federation	2018	2018	
(Cameroon)	Cameroon Floorball Association	2013		
(Central African Republic)	Central African Federation of Floorball	2018	2019	
(Colombia)	Colombian Floorball Association	2021	2021	
(Croatia)	Croatian Floorball Federation	2017	2018	
(Haiti)	Haitian Floorball Federation	2014	2016	
(Hong Kong)	Floorball Federation of Hong Kong		2016	
(Republic of Ireland)	Irish Floorball Association		2007	
(Kazakhstan)	National Floorball Federation of Kazakhstan		2022	
(Kenya)	Kenyan Floorball Federation	2016	2017	
(Kiribati)	Floorball Federation of Kiribati	2019	2019	
(Kuwait)	Floorball Federation of Kuwait	2019	2019	
(Laos)	Lao Floorball Federation		2025	
(Lithuania)	Lithuanian Floorball Federation	2010	2010	
(Macau)	Macau China Floorball General Association	2019	2022	
(Malta)	Malta Floorball Association	2015	2015	
(Mexico)	Mexican Floorball Federation		2023	
(Moldova)	Moldavian Floorball Federation	2007	2007	
(Mongolia)	Mongolian Floorball Federation	2005	2006	
(Mozambique)	Mozambique Floorball Association	2012	2012	
(Nigeria)	Floorball Federation of Nigeria		2017	
(Pakistan)	Pakistan Floorball Federation	2003	2004	
(Portugal)	Portuguese Floorball Federation	2007	2007	
(Romania)	Romanian Floorball Federation	2008	2008	
(Rwanda)	Floorball Federation of Rwanda		2018	
(Sierra Leone)	Floorball Association of Sierra Leone	2008	2008	
(Solomon Islands)	Solomon Islands Floorball Federation		2023	
(Somalia)	Somalia Floorball Federation		2016	
(South Africa)	Floorball South Africa	2013		
(Togo)	Togo Floorball	2018	2019	
(Turkey)	Floorball Turkey	2004	2008	
(Uganda)	Uganda Floorball Association	2015	2016	
(Venezuela)	Floorball Federation of Venezuela	2016	2017	

=== Development countries ===
Not yet IFF member:

- Bangladesh
- Bosnia and Herzegovina
- Bulgaria
- Greece
- Jordan
- Luxembourg
- Mali
- Nepal
- Qatar
- Sri Lanka
- United Arab Emirates

== Other ==
=== Confederations ===
Confederation Name	Founded	Headquarters
Asia Oceania Floorball Confederation (AOFC)	2005	Singapore City, Singapore

== Registered players ==
Based on the number of registered floorball players and a country's population, a list of the top 25 countries has been compiled:

Country	Registered players	% of population
Sweden	120,357	1.203%
Finland	61,368	0.947%
Czech Republic	40,605	0.362%
Switzerland	33,072	0.367%
Germany	12,836	0.013%
Denmark	8,741	0.115%
Norway	8,152	0.143%
Slovakia	7,058	0.086%
Russia	3,499	0.002%
Latvia	3,494	0.127%
Singapore	2,664	0.030%
Poland	2,609	0.004%
Japan	2,478	0.002%
South Korea	1,856	0.003%
France	1,596	0.002%
India	1,326	0.000%
Estonia	1,295	0.112%
Australia	1,274	0.007%
Netherlands	1,200	0.006%
Austria	1,183	0.012%
Belgium	998	0.008%
Malaysia	980	0.001%
Brazil	882	0.000%
Great Britain	707	0.001%
Hungary	639	0.009%
Canada	563	0.003%

== See also ==
- IFF World Ranking
- Association of IOC Recognised International Sports Federations
