= World Floorball Championships =

World Floorball Championships may refer to:

- Men's World Floorball Championship
- Women's World Floorball Championship
