= Floorball =

Indoor team sport

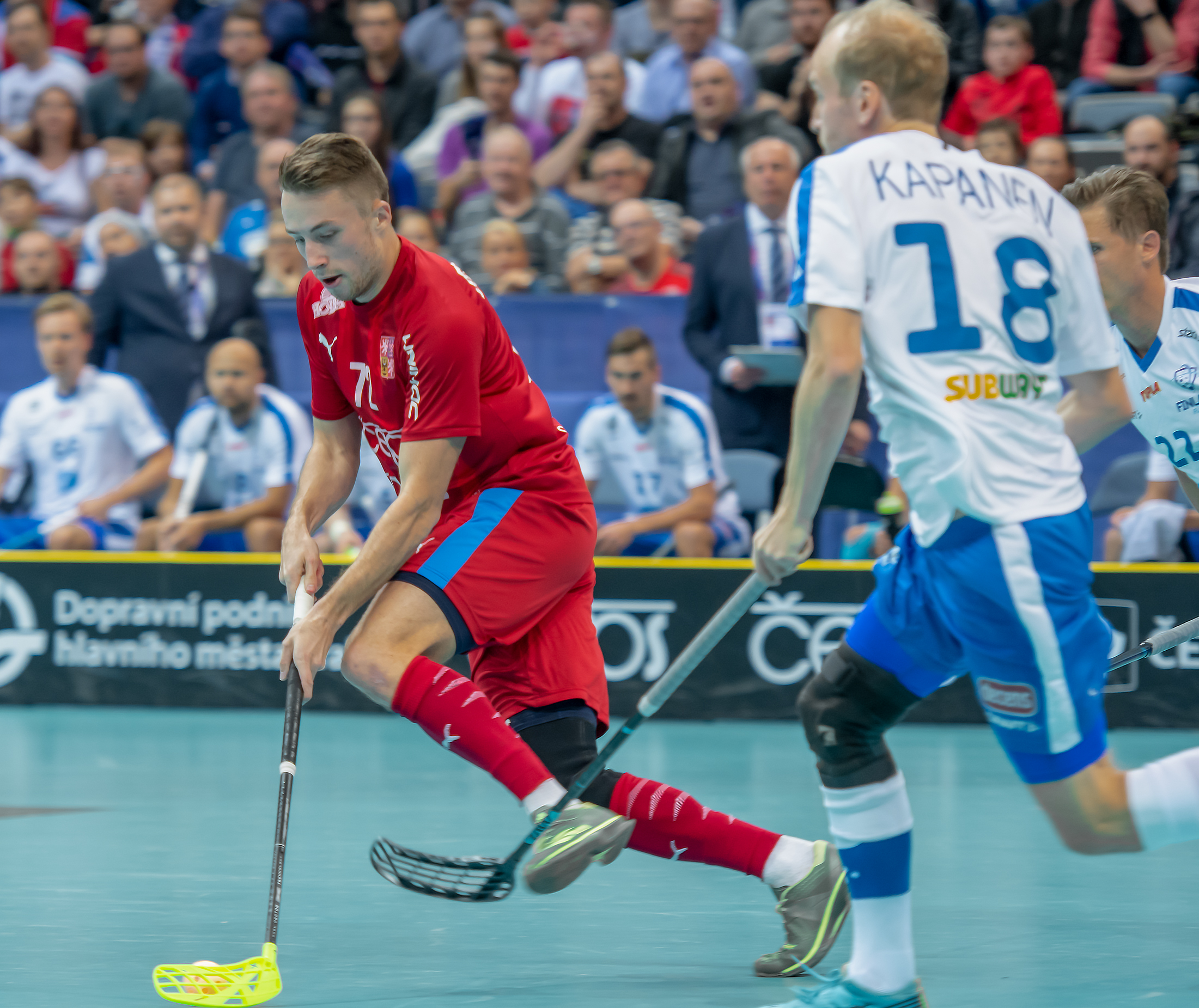
- A floorball game
- Highest governing body: International Floorball Federation
- Nicknames: indoor bandy; innebandy; salibandy; unihockey; plastic hockey; dry hockey
- First played: 1960; 66 years ago – late 1960s in Gothenburg, Sweden
- Clubs: ~ 4400

Characteristics
- Contact: Yes
- Team members: 6, including goalkeeper
- Mixed-sex: Yes, and separate competitions
- Type: Indoor
- Equipment: Shoes; Floorball stick; Glasses for safety

Presence
- Country or region: Czech Republic, Denmark, Estonia, Finland, Germany, Japan, Latvia, Norway, Poland, Slovakia, Sweden, Switzerland
- Olympic: No
- Paralympic: No
- World Games: 3 (Since 2017)

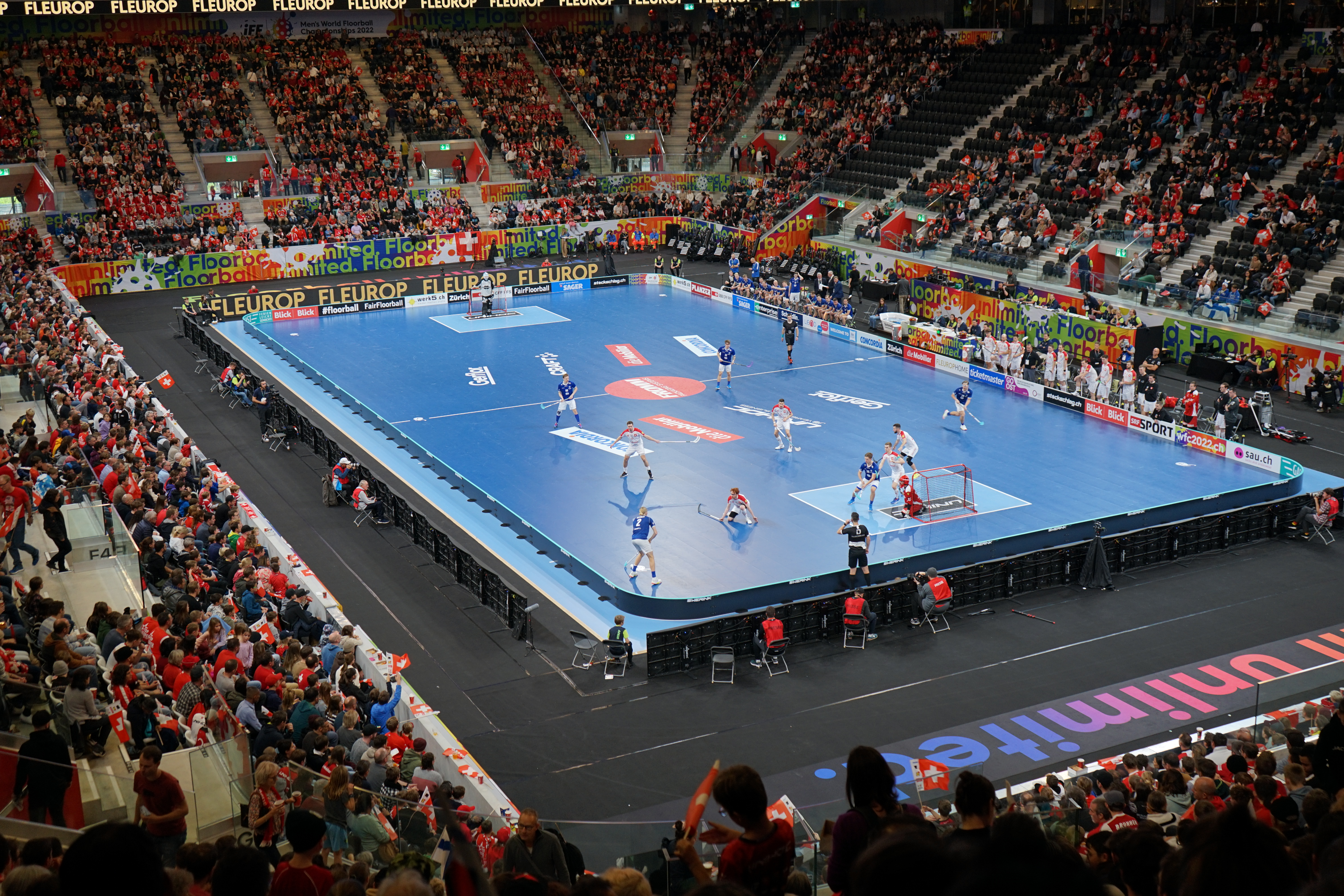
Gameplay at World Championships

Floorball (also known by salibandy or innebandy) is an indoor team sport. It is played on a 40 by 20-meter court enclosed by boards, using a plastic ball and two goals. During standard gameplay, each team has five outfield players and one goalkeeper on the court at any given time. The objective is to score more goals than the opposing team. Players use specialized floorball sticks during play. A standard match consists of three twenty-minute periods.

The game was invented in Sweden in the late 1960s. The basic rules were established in 1979 in Sweden. Official rules for matches were first written down in 1981.

The sport is organized internationally by the International Floorball Federation (IFF). As of 2022, there were about 330,000 registered floorball players worldwide. Events include an annual Champions Cup, EuroFloorball Cup and EuroFloorball Challenge for club teams and the biennial World Floorball Championships with separate divisions for men and women. Men's semi-professional club leagues include Finland's F-liiga, Sweden's Svenska Superligan, Switzerland's Unihockey Prime League, and the Czech Republic's Superliga florbalu. Women's semi-professional leagues from the same countries are F-liiga, Svenska Superligan, Unihockey Prime League and Extraliga žen.

While the IFF has 80 members, floorball is most popular where it has been developed the longest, such as the Czech Republic, Denmark, Estonia, Finland, Latvia, Poland, Norway, Sweden, and Switzerland. It is gaining popularity in Slovakia, Australia, New Zealand, India, Canada, Germany, Ireland, Japan, Singapore, Malaysia, the United States, and the United Kingdom.

Floorball has been included in the World Games since 2017 edition in Wrocław.

== Etymology ==
The game of floorball is also known by many other names, such as saalihoki (in Estonia), salibandy (in Finland), innebandy (in Sweden and Norway), unihockey (in Switzerland, Germany and Ireland), unihokej (in Poland) and grindų riedulys (in Lithuania). The names salibandy and innebandy are derived from bandy and translate to "hall bandy" and "indoor bandy" respectively. In Sweden, voices have been raised to get rid of the word innebandy as name of the sport, to avoid confusions with bandy. The name unihockey is shortened from universal hockey since it is meant to be a special and simplified hockey form.

== History ==
In various forms the game of floor hockey has been played since the early 20th Century in Canada as a recreational sport, especially in high school gymnasiums, as a playful variant of hockey. The basic design of floorball sticks is believed to have come from the ice skating team sport of bandy.

By the 1950s and 1960s many public school systems within Michigan in the United States incorporated floorball into their primary and secondary school gym classes. Americans have since claimed to have invented floorball. America held interstate tournaments in the 1960s.

Floorball was formally organized as an international and more organized sport in the late 1970s in Gothenburg, Sweden. The sport began as something that was played for fun as a pastime in schools. After a decade or so, floorball began showing up in Nordic countries where the former schoolyard pastime was becoming a developed sport. Formal rules were soon developed, and clubs began to form. After some time, several countries developed national associations, and the IFF was founded in 1986.

=== Expansion ===
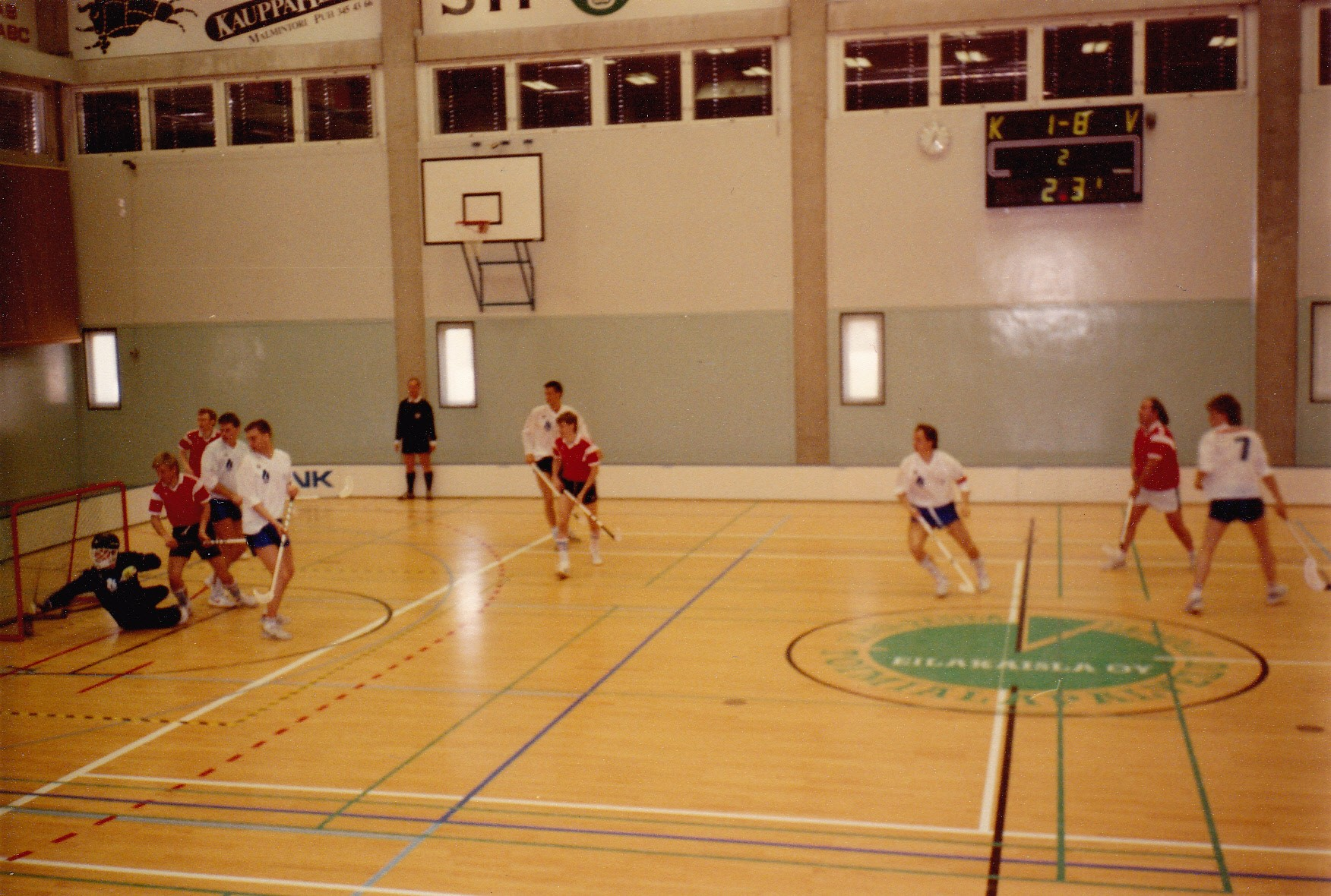
Floorball match in 1990

When the IFF was founded in 1986, the sport was played mostly in the Nordic countries, several parts of the rest of Europe and Japan. By 1990, floorball was recognized in 7 countries, and by the time of the first European Floorball Championships in 1994, the number had risen to 14. That number included the United States, who was the first country outside Europe and Asia to recognize floorball. By the time of the first men's world championships in 1996, 20 nations played floorball, with 12 of them participating at the tournament.

As of 2025, the IFF has 80 members, in addition to recognizing 11 other countries with ongoing floorball development. Of its members, 58 have national floorball associations that are recognized by the IFF. With the addition of Sierra Leone, Africa's first floorball nation, the IFF has at least one national association on each continent of the world, with the exception of Antarctica.

=== Development ===
10 years after the IFF was founded, the first world championships were played, with a sold out final of 15,106 people at the Globen in Stockholm, Sweden. In addition to that, the world's two largest floorball leagues, Finland's Salibandyliiga and Sweden's Svenska Superligan were formed, in 1986 and 1995 respectively.

==== Recognition ====
In December 2008, the IFF and the sport of floorball received recognition from the International Olympic Committee (IOC). In July 2011, the IOC welcomed the IFF into its family of Recognised International Sports Federations (ARISF). The IFF hoped that this recognition would help allow floorball to become a part of the 2020 Summer Olympics. As of 2024, the IOC has not announced any plans to add floorball to future Olympic games.

In January 2009, the IFF and the sport of floorball received recognition from the Special Olympics.

In addition to recognition by the IOC and Special Olympics, the IFF is also a member of the Global Association of International Sports Federations (GAISF, formerly SportAccord), and co-operates with the International University Sports Federation (FISU). Floorball is now also member of IWGA, which runs the World Games, and floorball is on the programme since Wrocław 2017.

== Rules ==
=== Overview ===
In floorball, two teams compete against each other, each consisting of five outfield players and a goalkeeper. The standard formation includes three attackers and two defenders, who utilize movement and passing to penetrate the opposing defense and score a goal. A team typically comprises two to three complete lines of five players, who substitute freely on the fly without stopping play, usually in shifts of approximately one minute. A standard match consists of three 20-minute periods. If the score is tied after regulation time, the game proceeds to a sudden-death overtime.

=== Time ===
A floorball game is played over three periods lasting 20 minutes each (15 minutes for juniors). The clock is stopped in the case of penalties, goals, time-outs and any situation where the ball is not considered to be in play. The signal of a timeout is a triple honking sound. An intermission of 10 minutes (or maximum 15 minutes in some competitions) takes place between each period, where teams change ends and substitution areas. Each team is allowed one timeout of 30 seconds, which is often used late in matches. There are two referees to oversee the game, each with equal authority. If a game ends in a tie, teams play ten minutes extra, and the team that scores first wins. If the game is still drawn after extra-time, a penalty shootout similar to ice-hockey decides the winner.

=== Contact ===
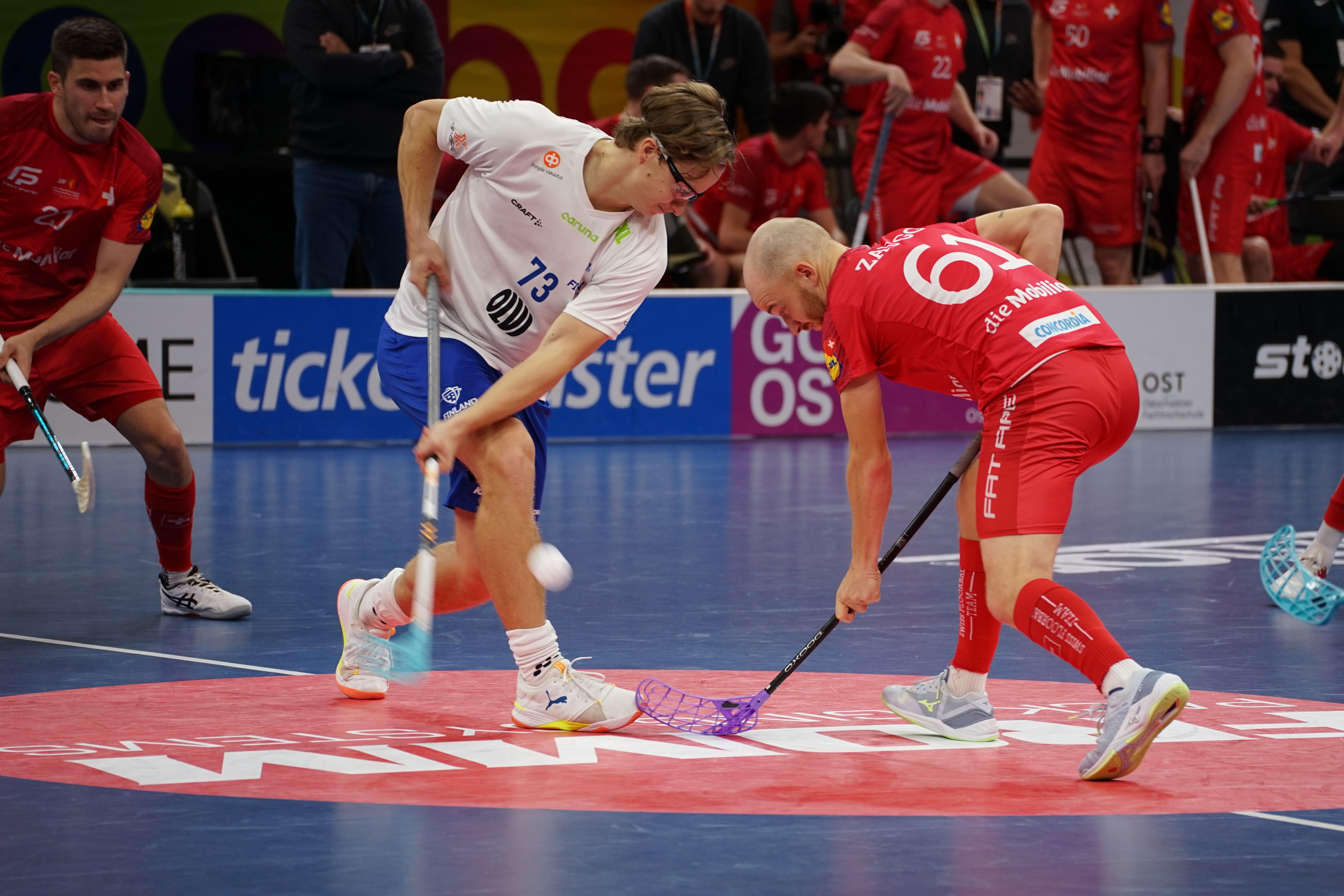
A face-off at the center spot

Checking is prohibited in floorball. Controlled shoulder-to-shoulder contact is allowed but ice hockey-like checking is forbidden. Pushing players without the ball or competing for a loose ball is also disallowed, and many of these infractions lead to two-minute penalties. The best comparison in terms of legal physical contact is Association football (soccer), where checking is used to improve one's positioning in relation to the ball rather than to remove an opposing player from the play. In addition to checking, players cannot lift an opponent's stick or perform any stick infractions in order to get to the ball. Moreover, players may not raise their stick or play the ball above knee level, and a stick may not be placed in between a player's legs. Passing the ball by foot is allowed more than once, following a rule change from 2022. Passing by hand or head deliberately may result in a two minutes penalty for the offending player. A field player may not enter the marked goal area and playing without stick is prohibited.

When a player commits a foul or when the ball is deemed unplayable, play is resumed from a free hit or a face-off. A free hit means that a player from one of the teams restarts the play from the place where the ball was last deemed unplayable. A comparable situation to this is a free kick in association football. For many fouls, such as stick infractions, a free hit is the only disciplinary action prescribed. However, at the referee's discretion, a two- or five-minute penalty may be assessed to the offending player. In that case, the player who committed the foul has to leave the field and sit out the punishment in a dedicated penalty area, leaving the player's team shorthanded for the time of the penalty. If an 'extreme' foul is committed, such as physical contact or unsportsmanlike conduct, a player may receive a 10-minute personal penalty.

=== Penalties ===
Two-minute penalties can arise from a number of infractions and result in the offending player being sat on a penalty seat next to the scorers/timekeepers and away from the team benches. Each penalty has a specific code that is recorded on the official match record along with the time of the foul. The team of the offending player will play short-handed for the full length of the penalty. More serious infractions result in 2+2 minute penalty.

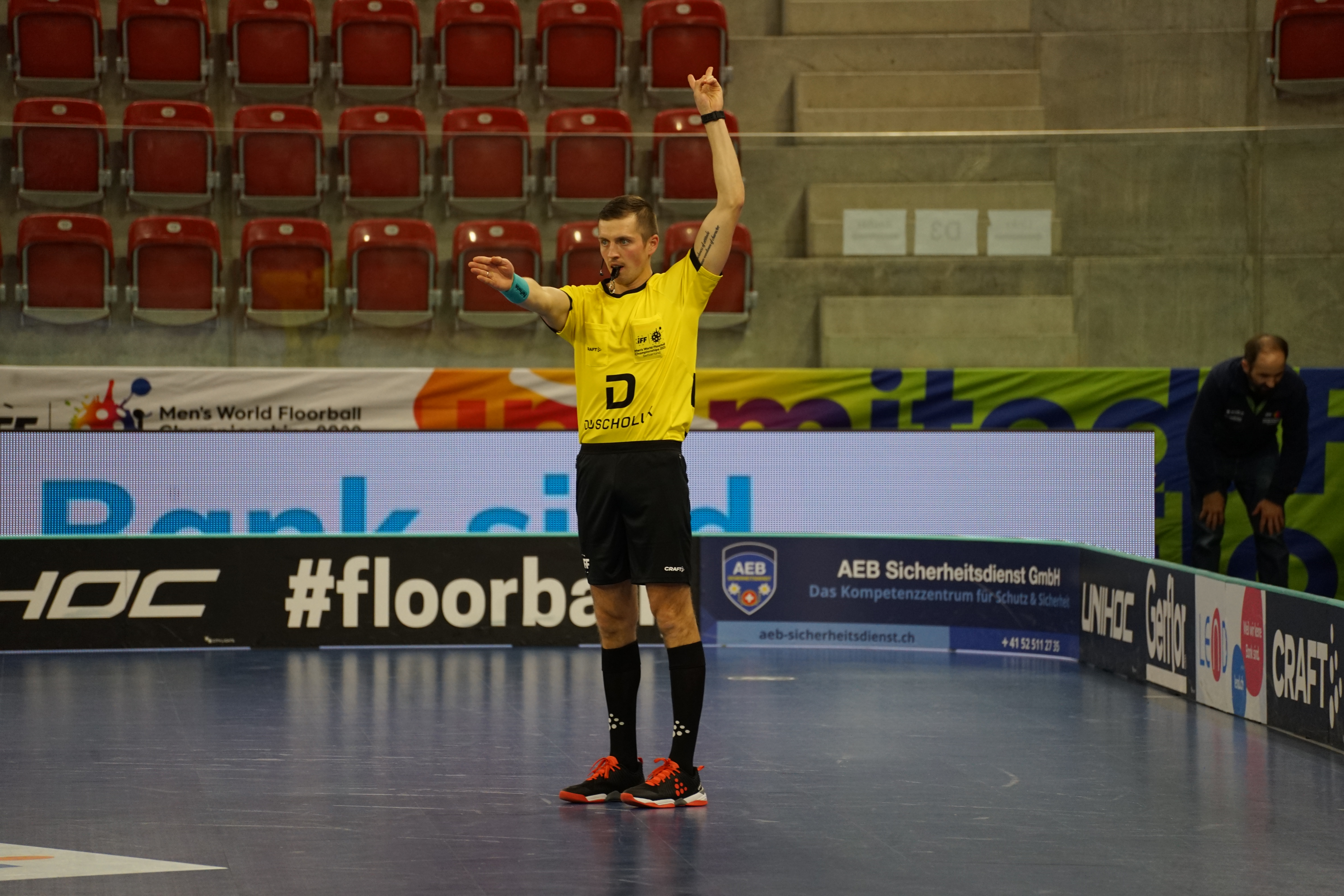
Referee indicating a penalty

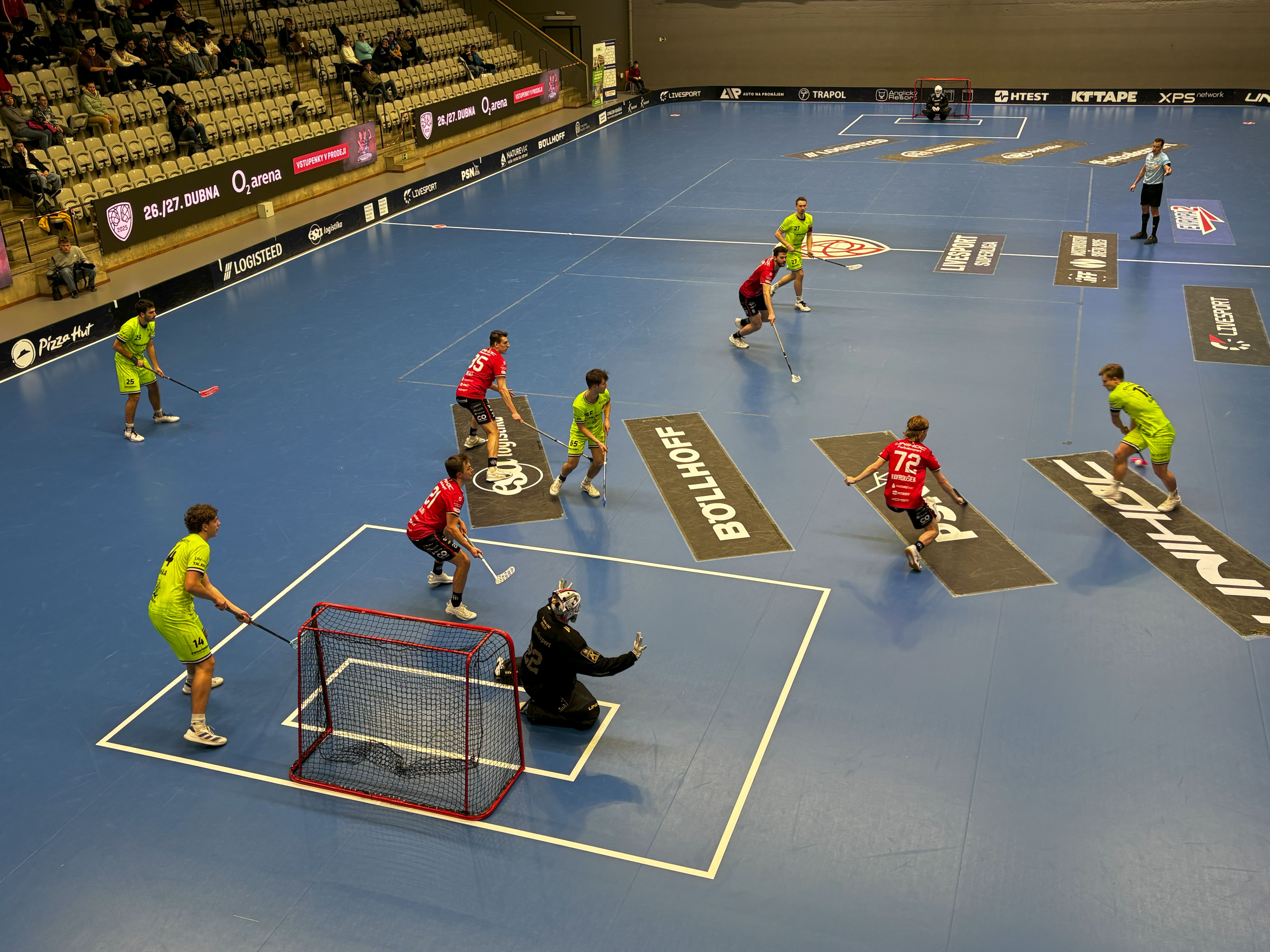
Powerplay

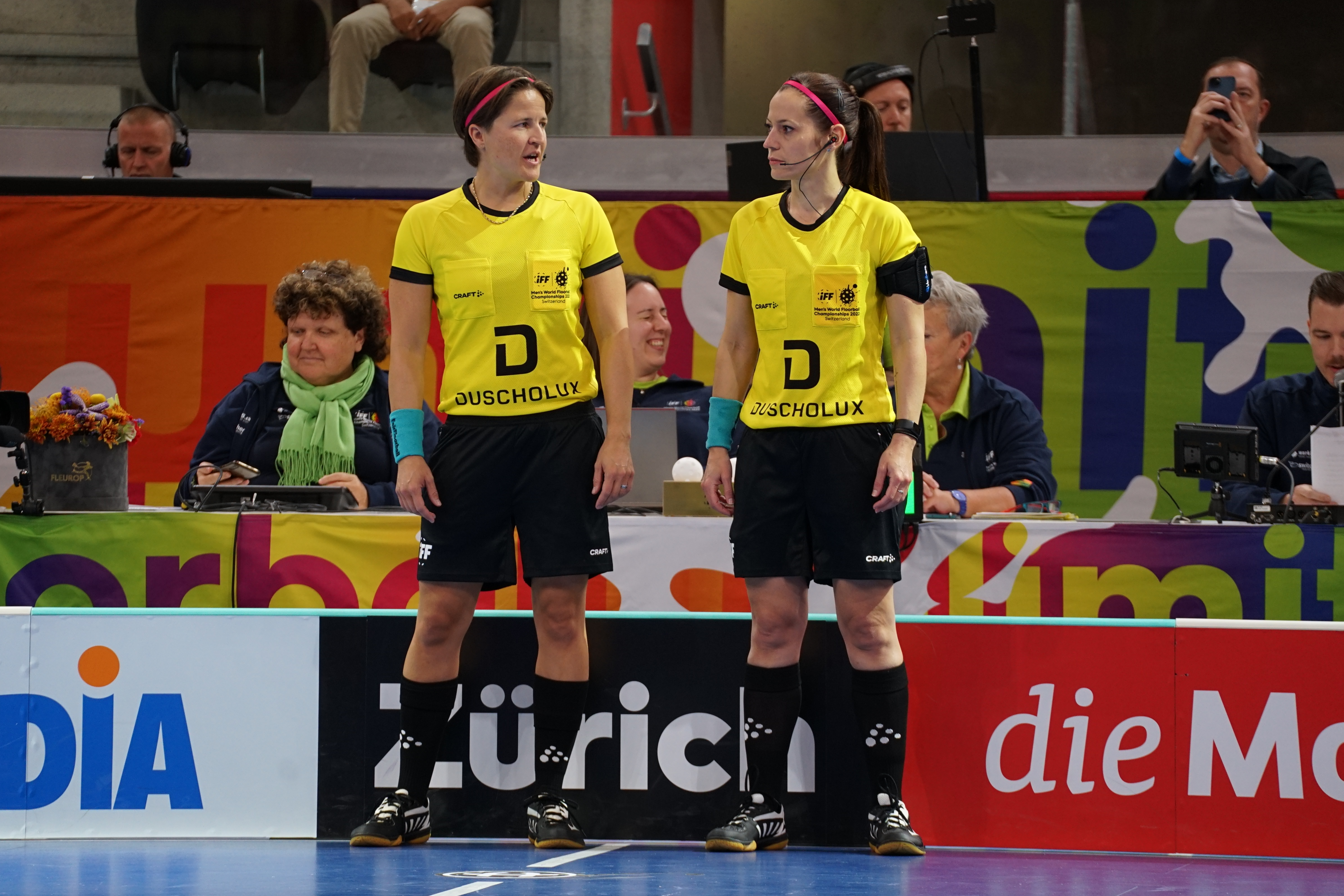
Referees

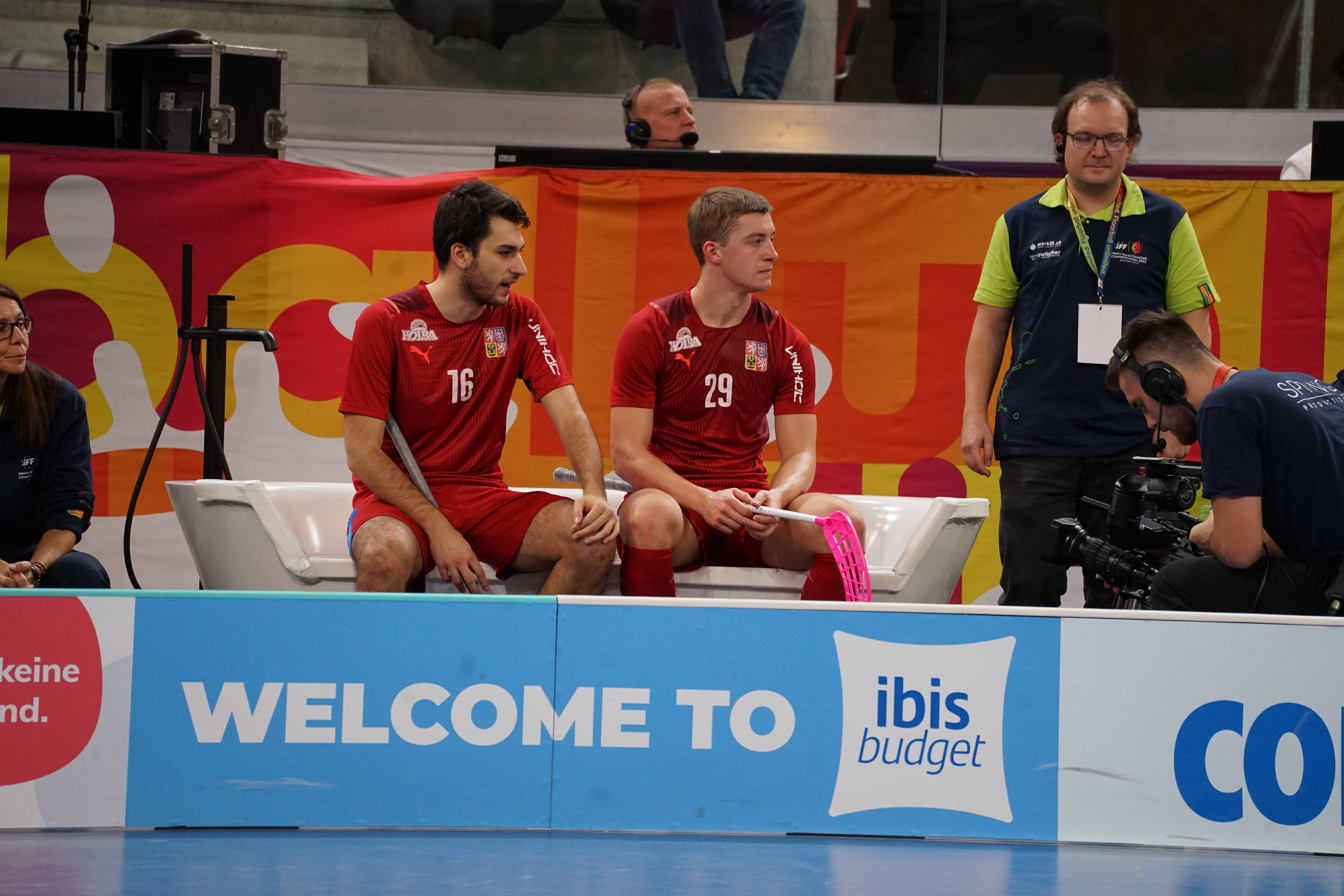
Penalized players in the penalty box

=== Rink ===
The dimensions of a floorball rink

Floorball is played indoors on a rink whose size can vary from 18–20 m (59–66 ft) wide to 36–40 m (118–131 ft) long, and which is surrounded by 50 cm (20 in) high enclosed boards with rounded corners. The goals are 160 cm (63 in) wide and 115 cm (45 in) high. Their depth is 65 cm (26 in) and they are 2.85 m (9 ft 4 in) from the end of the nearest boards. Face-off dots are marked on the center line. Dots are also marked 1.5 m (4 ft 11 in) from both sides of the rink on the goal lines imaginary extensions. The dots do not exceed 30 cm (12 in) in diameter. They do not have to be dots, they can also be crosses.

=== Equipment ===
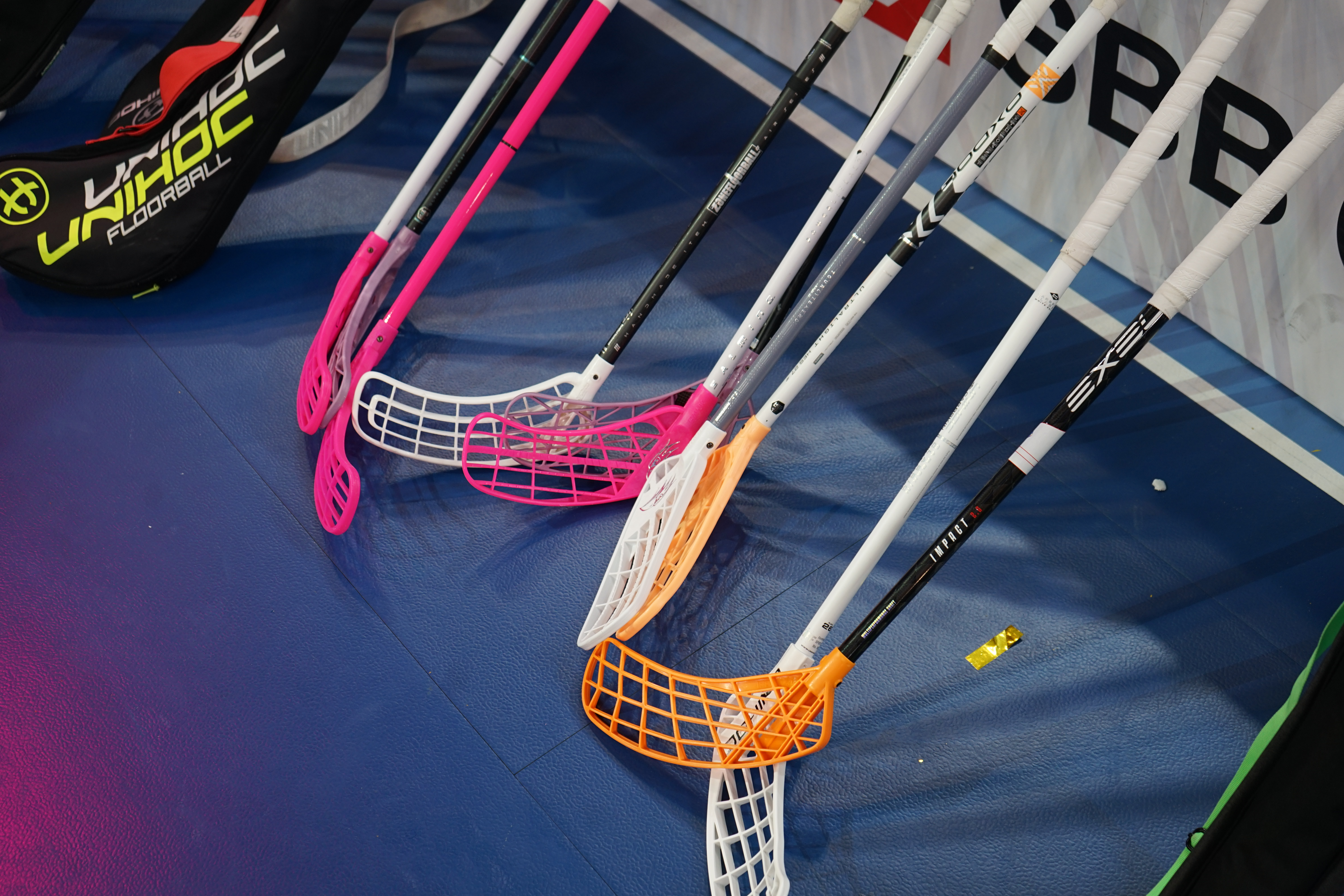
Floorball sticks

Typical equipment for a floorball player consists of a stick, a pair of shorts, a shirt, socks, and indoor sport shoes. Players may wear shin guards, eye protectors and protective padding for vital areas although most do not. Protective eyewear is, in some countries, compulsory for junior players.

A floorball stick is short compared with one for ice hockey; the maximum size for a stick is 114 cm (45 in). As a stick cannot weigh any more than 350 grams (12 oz), floorball sticks are often made of carbon and composite materials. The blade of the stick can either be "right" or "left" which indicates which way stick is supposed to be held from the player's point of view. A player who is right-handed will often use a "left" blade since they will be holding the stick to right, and the other way around for left-handed people.

=== Goalkeepers ===
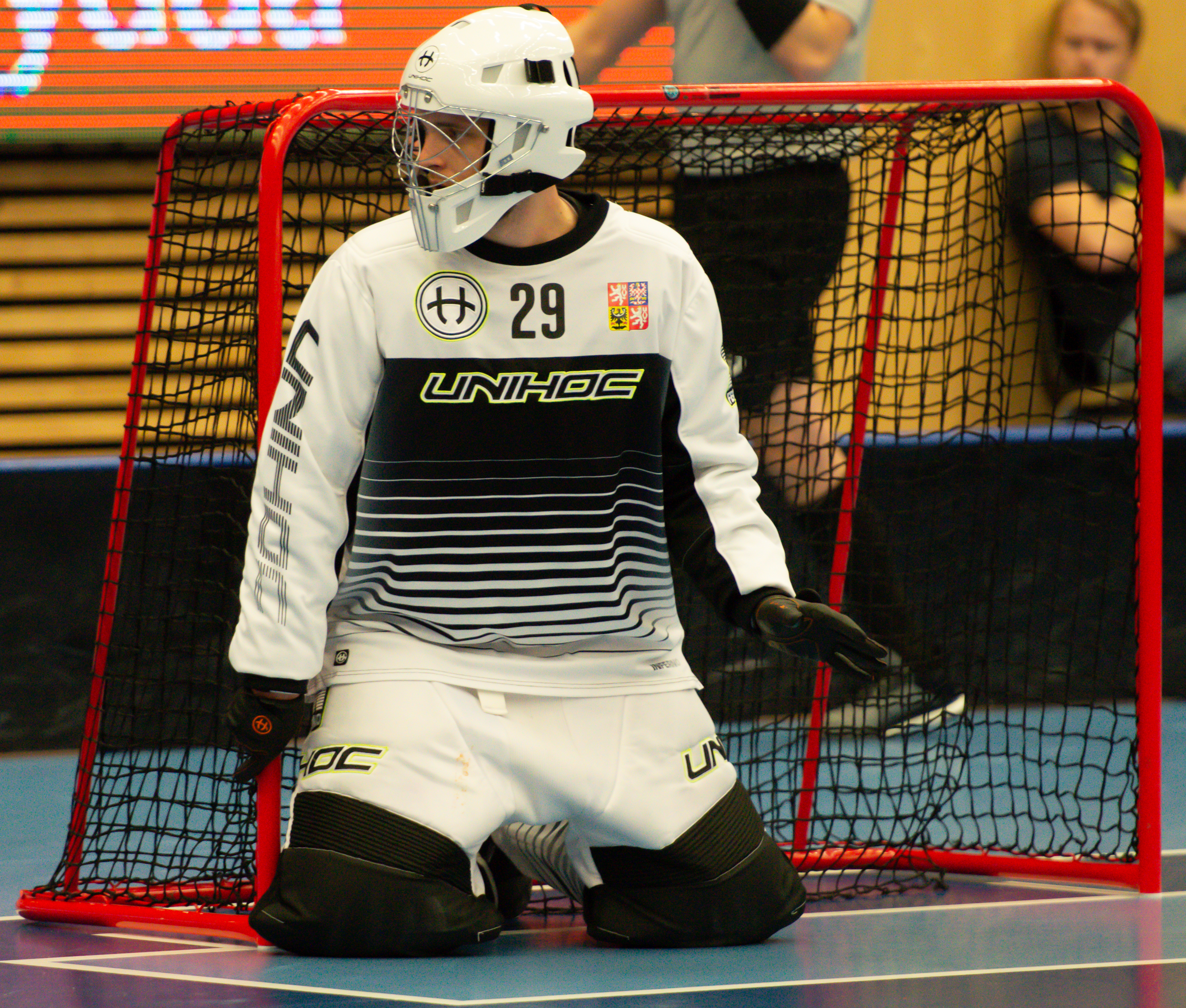
A masked goalkeeper in the goal

Goalkeepers wear limited protection provided by padded pants, a padded chest protector, knee pads and a helmet. Some goalkeepers like to wear gloves and/or wristbands. The goalkeeper may also wear other protective equipment such as elbow pads and jock straps but bulky padding is not permitted. Goalkeepers do not use sticks and plays predominantly on their knees. They may use their hands to play the ball when they are within the goalkeeper's box. There, they are allowed to throw the ball out to their teammates provided that the ball touches the ground before the half court mark. When they are completely outside the box, goalkeepers are considered field players and are not allowed to touch the ball with their hands.

The coach can take the goalkeeper off and substitute them for a field player whenever they like, although it usually only happens in the end to increase the chances of scoring with one more outfield player. This can bring an advantage for the attacking side of the team but also disadvantages when it comes to their own defense.

=== Ball ===
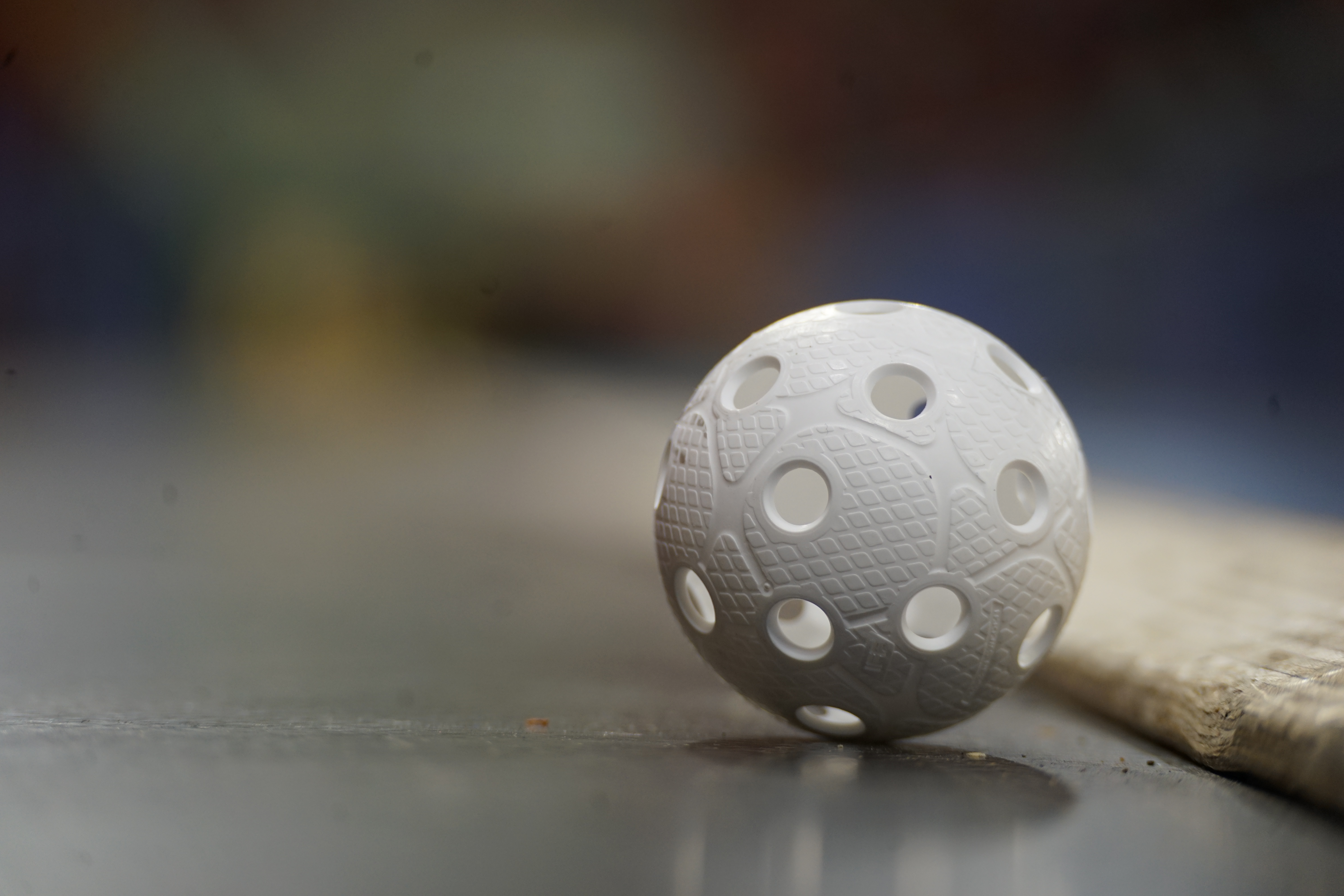
A floorball ball. This is a plastic precision type ball, characterized by 1,516 tiny dimples that reduce air resistance, as well as friction on the floor.

A floor ball weighs 23 g (0.81 oz) and its diameter is 72 mm (2.8 in). It has 26 holes in it, each of which are 10 mm (0.39 in) in diameter. Many of these balls now are made with aerodynamic technology, where the ball has over a thousand small dimples in it that reduce air resistance. There have been several times where a ball has been recorded to have traveled at a speed of approximately 200 km/h (120 mph).

== Competitions ==
=== World Games ===
Floorball has been a sport of the World Games since the 2017 edition. Only a men's tournament was featured in 2017 and 2022. Starting with the 2025 edition, a women's tournament is held too.

All men's tournaments so far have been won by Sweden. Finland won the inaugural women's tournament in 2025.

=== World Championships ===
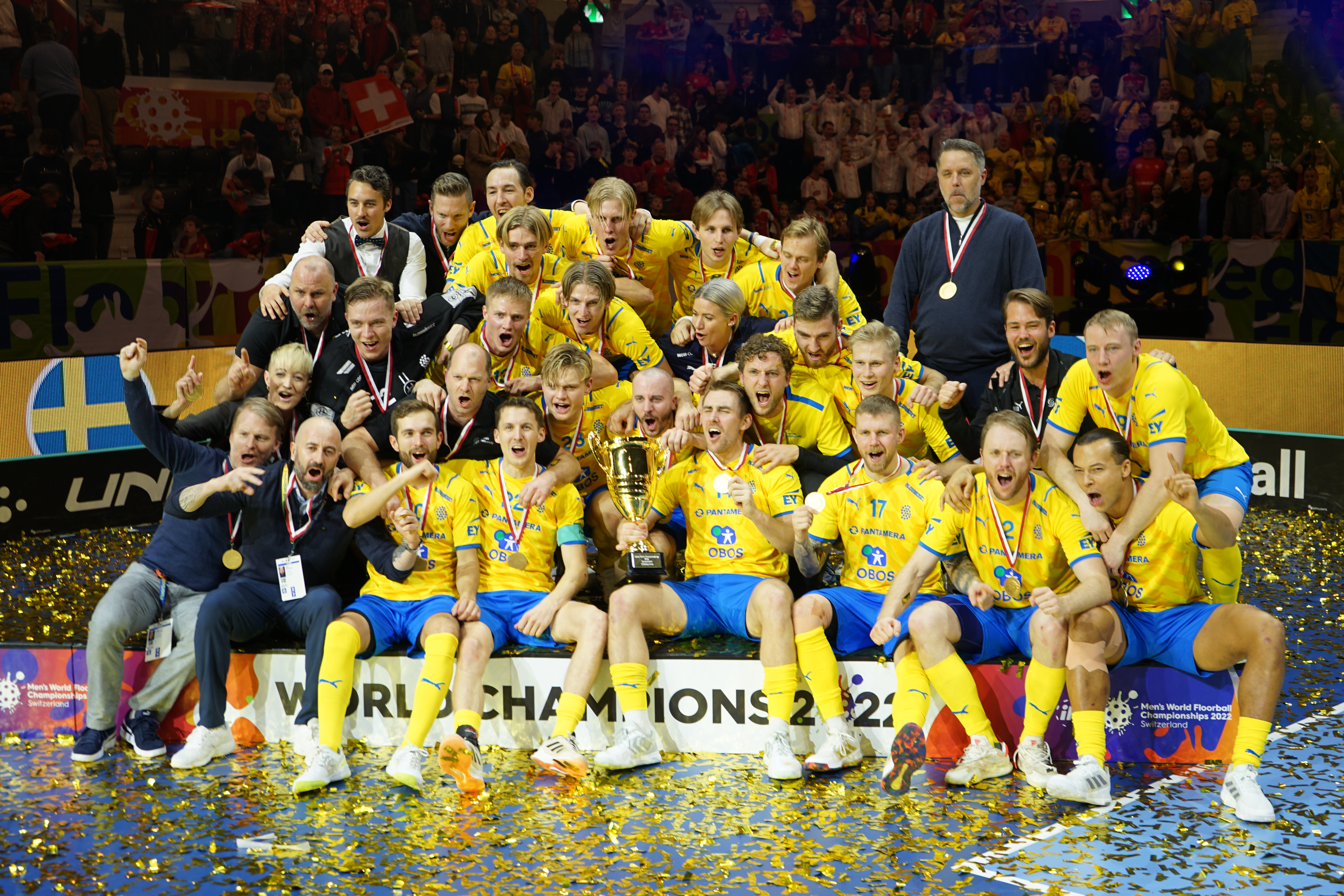
Swedish men's team celebrating victory at the 2022 World Championship

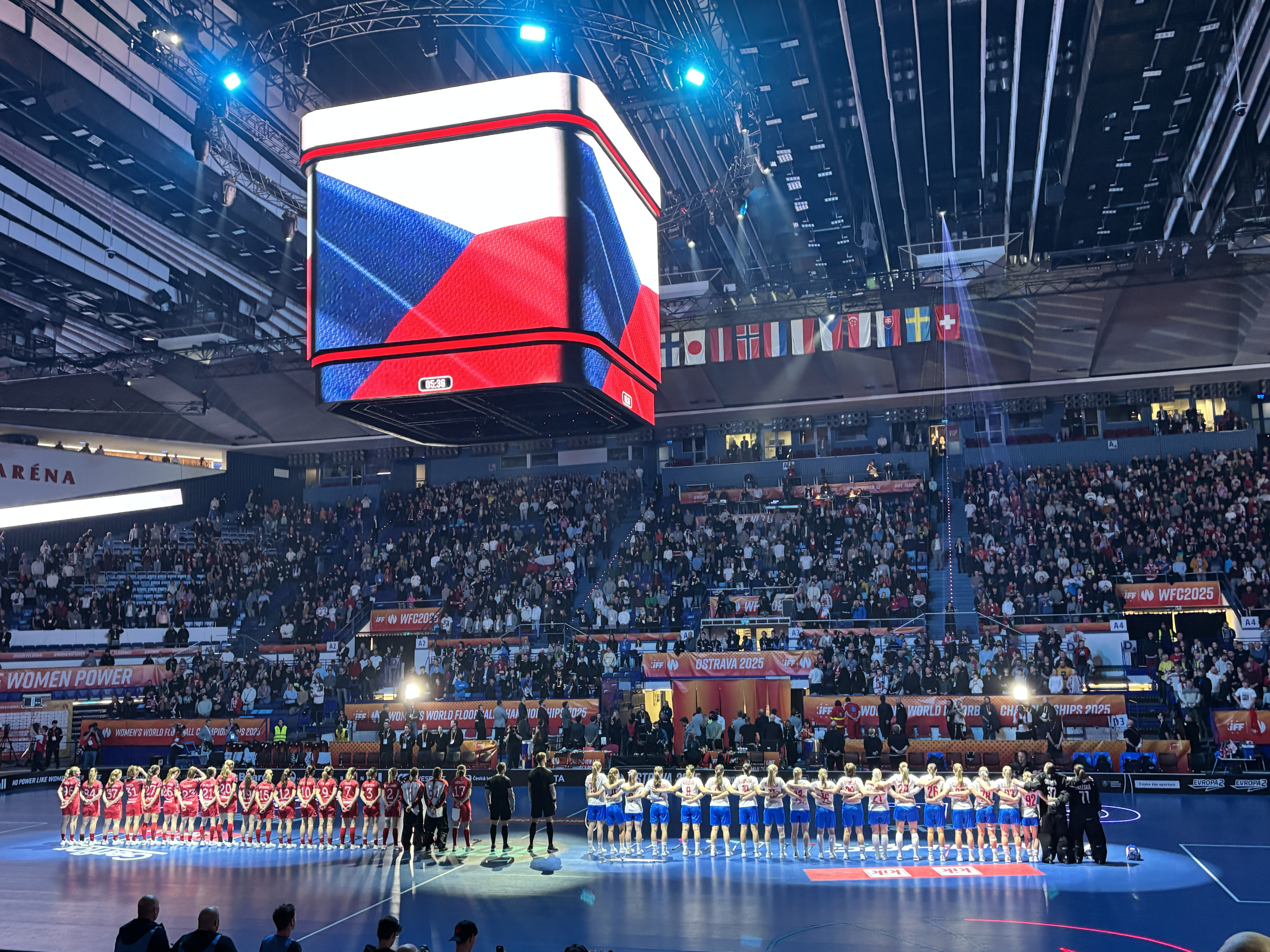
2025 Women's World Floorball Championships final in Ostrava

The world floorball championships is annual event, but each class only meet every other year—the men and women under 19 meet in even years, and the women and men under 19 meet in odd years. The Czech Republic, Finland, Norway, Sweden, and Switzerland remain the only five countries to have ever captured a medal at a World Championship event.

- The Men's World Floorball Championship takes place every December (since 2008) in every even year.
- The Women's World Floorball Championship takes place every December (since 2009) in every odd year.
- The Men's under-19 World Floorball Championship takes place every May (since 2009) in every odd year.
- The Women's under-19 World Floorball Championships takes place every May (since 2008) in every even year.

From 1996 to 2009, the IFF used a World Floorball Championship format where the last team in the A-Division was relegated to the B-Division, while the top team in the B-Division was promoted to the A-Division. In 2010, the IFF adopted a FIFA-like continental qualification system, where teams must qualify to play at the world championships. Depending on the number of countries registered per continent or region, the IFF gives spots for the world championships. After 2028, the interval between championships will be extended to four years, interspersed with continental championships, and will be held in November.

=== Asia Pacific Floorball Championship ===
The Asia Pacific Floorball Championships are played every single year in New Zealand, Australia, Singapore, or Japan. The event was created by the Singapore Floorball Association together with the cooperation of the Asia Oceania Floorball Confederation (AOFC). Members of the AOFC get together during this tournament to play for the Asia Pacific Floorball Championship every year.

As of 2010, the Asia Pacific Floorball Championship is also the qualifying tournament for the World Floorball Championships.

=== Czech Open ===
The world's largest club team tournament, the Czech Open is a traditional summer tournament held in Prague, Czech Republic. It is famous not only for its on-court activities, but also for those off-court. The tournament attracts 200+ clubs every year from 20 countries.

=== International Club Competitions ===
Three tournaments are organized for clubs that have won their respective national leagues, categorized according to their country's position in the IFF World Ranking:

- Champions Cup: For the national champions of the four highest-ranked countries: Czechia, Finland, Sweden, and Switzerland.
- EuroFloorball Cup: For the national champions of countries ranked fifth through tenth.
- EuroFloorball Challenge: For the national champions of all other countries.

== Variations ==
=== 3v3 ===
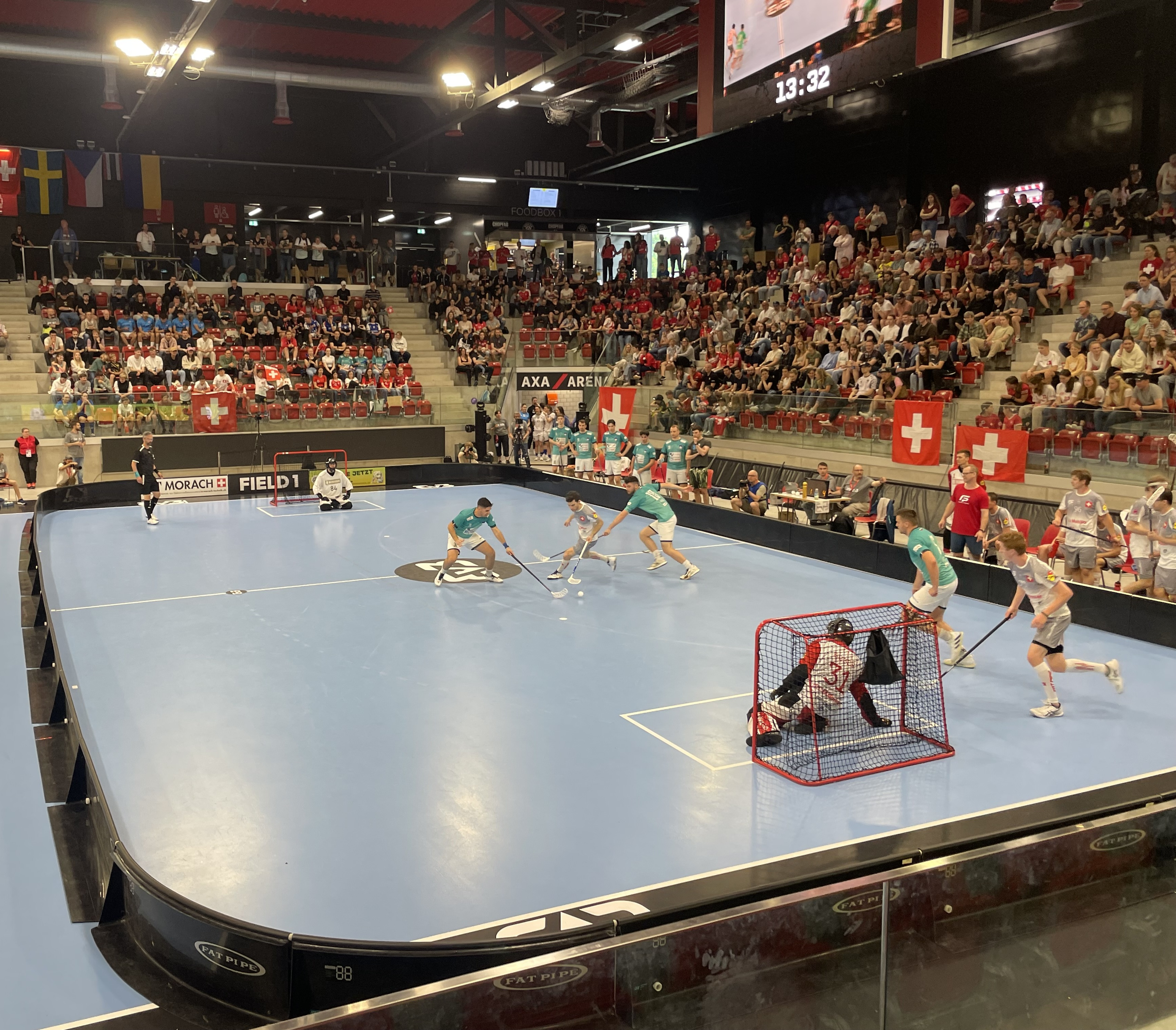
3v3 match

This variant works almost the same as the normal 5v5 one, but with only 3 field players per team. Goalkeepers have a bag full of balls behind the goal, and they will play one if the current ball goes out the field. They can score directly if the ball bounces before the midfield line. Game time is divided in 2 parts of 10 minutes each with semi-effective time (only stops on goals or interruptions led by the referee) and a 2-minute break.

3v3 World Floorball Championships are being held since 2024, initially as part of the Under-19 World Floorball Championships, since 2026 as a standalone competition.

=== Freebandy ===
Freebandy is a sport that developed in the 2000s from floorball fanatics who specialize in a technique called "zorro", which involves lifting the ball onto a stick and allowing air resistance and fast movements to keep the ball "stuck" to the stick. This technique is also referred to as "airhooking" or "skyhooking". In freebandy, the rules are very much the same of those of floorball, with the exception of high nets and no infractions for high sticking. As well, the sticks are slightly tweaked from those of a floorball variety to include a "pocket" where the ball can be placed.

=== Special Olympics ===
Floorball at the Special Olympics is slightly modified from the "regular" form of floorball. Matches are played 3-on-3 with a goaltender, on a smaller court that measures 20 metres (66 ft) long by 12 metres (39 ft) wide. This form of floorball was developed for the intellectually disabled, and has yet to be played at the Special Olympics. Floorball was played as a demonstration sport at the 2013 Special Olympics World Winter Games, and was played as an official sport at the games in 2017.

=== Streetbandy ===
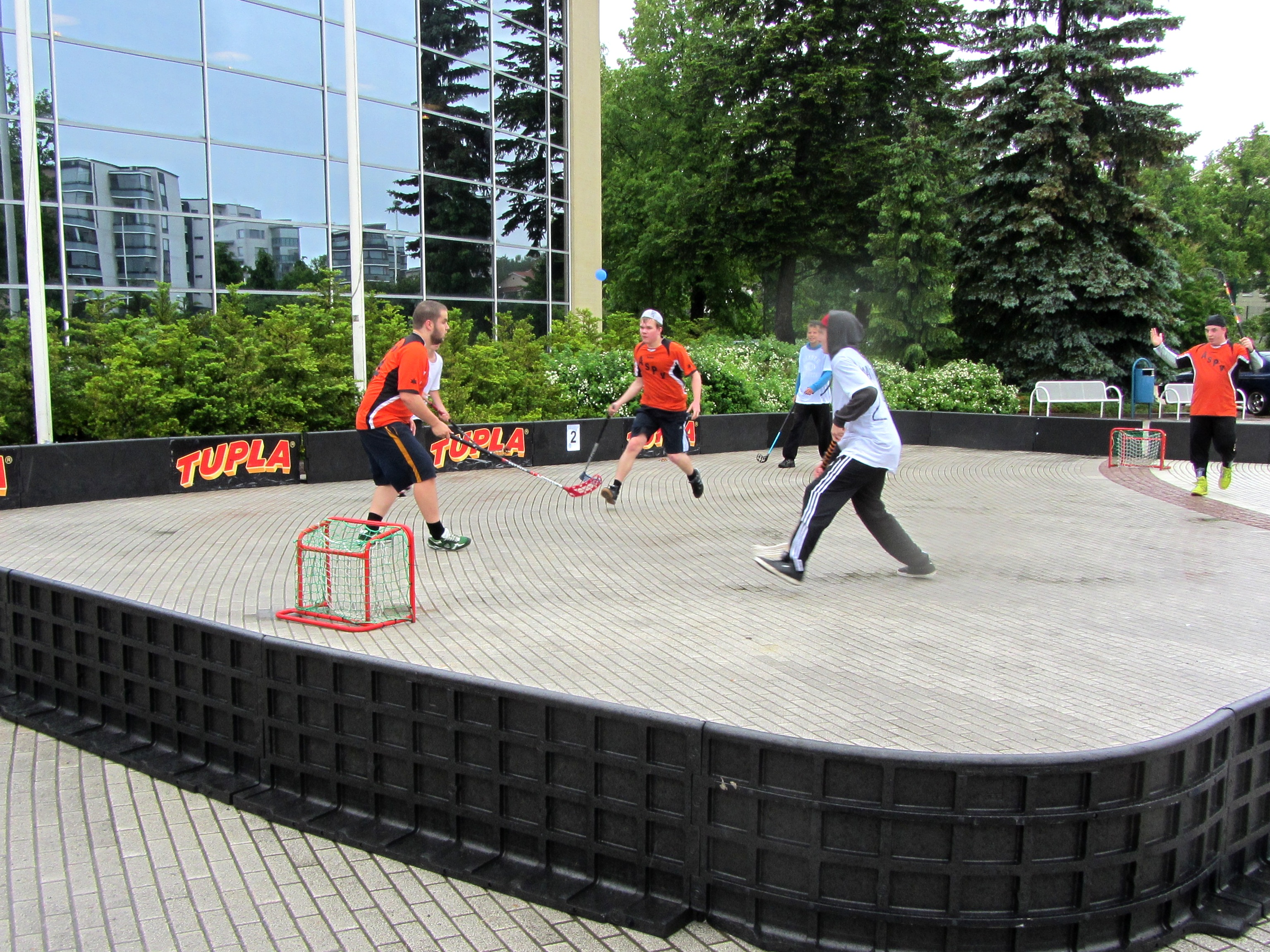
Street Floorball Tournament was arranged on Helsinki, Finland

A simplified less formal version of floorball, played with smaller team numbers and shorter periods, and typically outdoors on various surfaces, including AstroTurf. In its most basic form, it is an informal pick up game amongst friends. However, a more formal version is played in Sweden, with the following structure:

- three field players on each team, with smaller overall team sizes (including subs.)
- small goals, with no goalie
- smaller playing area, usually closer to a half rink.
- 10-minute length.
- tendency towards "first team to score 5 goals in the time limit" rather than traditional scoring. Sudden death on a draw.
- penalties are taken from the centre line.
- most situations arising from the ball leaving play are resumed from a fixed point (e.g. corner, centre line)
- no physical contact, high sticks or dangerous activity allowed.

=== Swiss floorball ===
Swiss floorball called unihockey is a revised version of a floorball match. The match is played on a slightly smaller court and often involves only three field players playing on each side, in 3-on-3 floorball. This form of floorball is also slightly shorter, with only two periods of 15 to 20 minutes each played. In Switzerland this form of playing is called "smallcourt" (Kleinfeld), opposed to the usual style of playing on a bigger court, which is called "bigcourt" (Grossfeld).

=== Wheelchair floorball ===
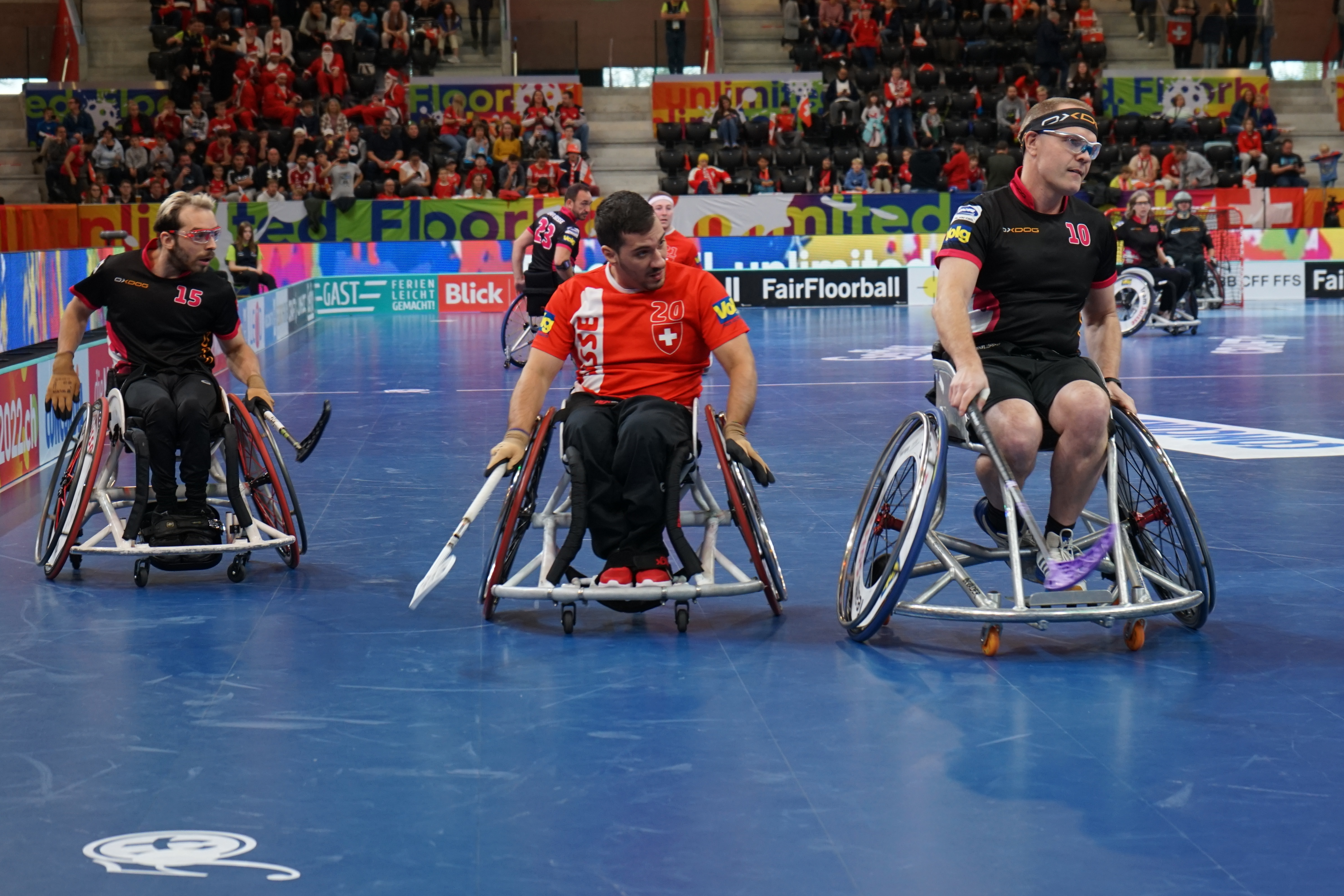
Wheelchair floorball game

Originally developed for players with disabilities, wheelchair floorball is played with exactly the same rules as "regular" floorball. Players use the same stick and ball, and goaltenders are also allowed to play.

The first ever IFF-sanctioned wheelchair floorball matches were played between the men's teams of the Czech Republic and Sweden during the 2008 Men's World Floorball Championships in Prague.

In addition to this, there is also an electric wheelchair variation.

== See also ==
- Indoor hockey
- Floor hockey
- Field hockey
