= 2026 Women's U-19 World Floorball Championships qualification =

Floorball competition

The 2026 Women's U-19 World Floorball Championships qualification was a series of tournaments that determined the teams qualified for the 2026 Women's U-19 World Floorball Championships. The final tournament again features 16 teams.

== Distribution of berths ==
The distribution by confederation for the 2026 Women's U-19 World Floorball Championships is:

- Host country: 1 berth
- 2024 Women's U-19 World Floorball Championships: 9 berths
- Asian qualification tournament: 3 berths
- Americas: 1 berth
- European qualification tournament: 2 berths

== Qualified teams ==
Event	Berths	Qualified teams	WR	2024	Appearance(s)			Previous best performance
Event	Berths	Qualified teams	WR	2024	Total	Streak	Last	Previous best performance
Automatically qualified	11	Sweden	1	1st	12	12	2024	Champions (2004, 2006, 2010, 2014, 2016, 2018, 2022, 2024)
Automatically qualified	11	Finland	2	2nd	12	12	2024	Champions (2012, 2020)
Automatically qualified	11	Czech Republic	3	3rd	12	12	2024	Runners-up (2022)
Automatically qualified	11	Switzerland	4	4th	12	12	2024	Champions (2008)
Automatically qualified	11	Slovakia	5	5th	11	11	2024	Fifth place (2010, 2014, 2022, 2024)
Automatically qualified	11	Poland	6	6th	11	11	2024	Fourth place (2008)
Automatically qualified	11	Denmark	7	7th	3	3	2024	Seventh place (2024)
Automatically qualified	11	Norway	8	8th	10	3	2024	Fifth place (2016)
Automatically qualified	11	Latvia	9	9th	10	4	2024	Fourth place (2004)
Automatically qualified	11	Italy (H)	12	12th	3	3	2024	Twelfth place (2024)
Automatically qualified	11	Canada	16	16th	3	3	2024	Sixteenth place (2022, 2024)
Asian qualification tournament	3	Australia	15	15th	3	3	2024	Fiftheenth place (2022, 2024)
Asian qualification tournament	3	Japan	25	N/A	Debut			
Asian qualification tournament	3	Singapore	11	11th	2	2	2024	Eleventh place (2024)
European qualification tournament	2	Germany	10	10th	8	5	2024	Seventh place (2004, 2018)
European qualification tournament	2	Hungary	14	14th	7	3	2024	Seventh place (2012)

== Asia-Oceania qualification ==
The Asia-Oceania qualification was played from 8 to 10 January 2026 in Perth, Australia. The top three teams qualified for the 2026 Women's U-19 World Floorball Championships.

=== Group composition ===
- Singapore (11)
- New Zealand (13)
- Australia (15) (H)
- Japan (25)

=== Group ===
Pos	Team	Pld	W	D	L	GF	GA	GD	Pts	Qualification
1	Australia (H)	3	2	1	0	14	5	+9	5	2026 Women's U-19 World Championships
2	Japan	3	2	0	1	18	8	+10	4	2026 Women's U-19 World Championships
3	Singapore	3	1	1	1	13	9	+4	3	2026 Women's U-19 World Championships
4	New Zealand	3	0	0	3	4	27	−23	0	

Source: IFF
(H) Hosts

8 January 2026; 11:00	Australia	3–2 (1–0, 2–1, 0–1)	Japan	Mandurah Aquatic and Recreation Centre, Perth; Attendance: 280

Report

Referees:
Yongky Priyanto
Fajar Hidayat

1–0
1–1
2–1
3–1
3–2

22
Shots
24

8 January 2026; 15:00	New Zealand	0–9 (0–1, 0–5, 0–3)	Singapore	Mandurah Aquatic and Recreation Centre, Perth; Attendance: 115

Report

Referees:
Massada Cabillas
Joemar Tandoc

0–1
0–2
0–3
0–4
0–5
0–6
0–7
0–8
0–9

10
Shots
48

9 January 2026; 11:00	Singapore	2–2 (0–1, 2–0, 0–1)	Australia	Mandurah Aquatic and Recreation Centre, Perth; Attendance: 250

Report

Referees:
Yongky Priyanto
Fajar Hidayat

0–1
1–1
2–1
2–2

2 min
Penalties
4 min
22
Shots
13

9 January 2026; 15:00	Japan	9–3 (1–1, 3–1, 5–1)	New Zealand	Mandurah Aquatic and Recreation Centre, Perth; Attendance: 150

Report

Referees:
Massada Cabillas
Joemar Tandoc

1–0
1–1
2–1
3–1
3–2
4–2
5–2
6–2
6–3
7–3
8–3
9–3

0 min
Penalties
2 min
34
Shots
13

10 January 2026; 11:00	Australia	9–1 (4–0, 4–1, 1–0)	New Zealand	Mandurah Aquatic and Recreation Centre, Perth; Attendance: 300

Report

Referees:
Yongky Priyanto
Fajar Hidayat

1–0
2–0
3–0
4–0
5–0
5–1
6–1
7–1
8–1
9–1

4 min
Penalties
4 min
41
Shots
11

10 January 2026; 15:00	Japan	7–2 (2–1, 2–0, 3–1)	Singapore	Mandurah Aquatic and Recreation Centre, Perth; Attendance: 270

Report

Referees:
Massada Cabillas
Joemar Tandoc

0–1
1–1
2–1
3–1
4–1
5–1
5–2
6–2
7–2

2 min
Penalties
0 min
26
Shots
16

== European qualification ==
The European qualification tournament was played from 4 to 8 February 2026 in Berlin, Germany. The top two teams qualified for the 2026 Women's U-19 World Floorball Championships.

=== Group composition ===
- Germany (10)
- Hungary (14)
- France (17)
- Austria (18)
- Ukraine (26)

=== Group ===
Pos	Team	Pld	W	D	L	GF	GA	GD	Pts	Qualification
1	Germany	4	4	0	0	43	4	+39	8	2026 Women's U-19 World Championships
2	Hungary	4	2	1	1	25	19	+6	5	2026 Women's U-19 World Championships
3	Austria	4	2	1	1	26	23	+3	5	
4	Ukraine	4	1	0	3	18	35	−17	2	
5	France	4	0	0	4	14	45	−31	0	

Source: IFF

4 February 2026; 14:00	France	4–10 (0–1, 1–5, 2–4)	Ukraine	Sporthalle Grundschule an der Rennbahn, Berlin; Attendance: 84

Report

Referees:
Ales Krzic
Tilen Vehovec

0–1
0–2
0–3
0–4
0–5
1–5
2–5
2–6
3–6
3–7
3–8
4–8
4–9
4–10

10 min
Penalties
4 min
35
Shots
34

4 February 2026; 17:00	Germany	9–2 (4–1, 2–1, 3–0)	Austria	Sporthalle Grundschule an der Rennbahn, Berlin

Report

Referees:
Christian Crivelli
Davide Rampoldi

1–0
2–0
3–0
3–1
4–1
5–1
5–2
6–2
7–2
8–2
9–2

2 min
Penalties
2 min
36
Shots
13

5 February 2026; 14:00	Austria	5–5 (1–0, 1–4, 3–1)	Hungary	Sporthalle Grundschule an der Rennbahn, Berlin; Attendance: 83

Report

Referees:
Ales Krzic
Tilen Vehovec

1–0
2–0
2–1
2–2
2–3
2–4
3–4
3–5
4–5
5–5

6 min
Penalties
4 min
31
Shots
30

5 February 2026; 17:00	Ukraine	1–12 (0–3, 0–2, 1–7)	Germany	Sporthalle Grundschule an der Rennbahn, Berlin; Attendance: 112

Report

Referees:
Christian Crivelli
Davide Rampoldi

0–1
0–2
0–3
0–4
0–5
0–6
0–7
0–8
0–9
1–9
1–10
1–11
1–12

10 min
Penalties
0 min
10
Shots
43

6 February 2026; 14:00	Austria	7–5 (1–0, 3–2, 3–3)	Ukraine	Sporthalle Grundschule an der Rennbahn, Berlin; Attendance: 89

Report

Referees:
Christian Crivelli
Davide Rampoldi

1–0
1–1
2–1
3–1
4–1
4–2
5–2
6–2
7–2
7–3
7–4
7–5

10 min
Penalties
28 min
37
Shots
35

6 February 2026; 17:00	Hungary	7–6 (3–1, 1–3, 3–2)	France	Sporthalle Grundschule an der Rennbahn, Berlin; Attendance: 82

Report

Referees:
Ales Krzic
Tilen Vehovec

0–1
1–1
2–1
3–1
3–2
3–3
3–4
4–4
4–5
5–5
5–6
6–6
7–6

0 min
Penalties
8 min
46
Shots
22

7 February 2026; 12:00	Ukraine	2–12 (0–3, 2–3, 0–6)	Hungary	Sporthalle Grundschule an der Rennbahn, Berlin; Attendance: 71

Report

Referees:
Ales Krzic
Tilen Vehovec

0–1
0–2
0–3
1–3
2–3
2–4
2–5
2–6
2–7
2–8
2–9
2–10
2–11
2–12

4 min
Penalties
2 min
35
Shots
56

7 February 2026; 15:00	France	0–16 (0–5, 0–4, 0–7)	Germany	Sporthalle Grundschule an der Rennbahn, Berlin; Attendance: 205

Report

Referees:
Christian Crivelli
Davide Rampoldi

0–1
0–2
0–3
0–4
0–5
0–6
0–7
0–8
0–9
0–10
0–11
0–12
0–13
0–14
0–15
0–16

2 min
Penalties
2 min
8
Shots
52

8 February 2026; 12:00	France	4–12 (2–5, 0–5, 2–2)	Austria	Sporthalle Grundschule an der Rennbahn, Berlin; Attendance: 123

Report

Referees:
Ales Krzic
Tilen Vehovec

0–1
0–2
1–2
1–3
1–4
1–5
2–5
2–6
2–7
2–8
2–9
2–10
2–11
2–12
3–12
4–12

6 min
Penalties
6 min
22
Shots
46

8 February 2026; 15:00	Germany	6–1 (1–0, 2–1, 3–0)	Hungary	Sporthalle Grundschule an der Rennbahn, Berlin; Attendance: 228

Report

Referees:
Christian Crivelli
Davide Rampoldi

1–0
2–0
3–0
3–1
4–1
5–1
6–1

2 min
Penalties
2 min
40
Shots
14
