= Under-19 World Floorball Championships =

International junior floorball tournament

- Most recent season or competition: 2026 Women's U-19 World Floorball Championships
- Sport: Floorball
- Founded: Men: 2001; 25 years ago Women: 2004; 22 years ago
- No. of teams: 16 (finals)
- Continent: International (IFF)
- Most recent champions: Men: Finland (2025, 5th title); Women: Finland (2026, 3rd title)
- Most titles: Men: Sweden (6 titles, the last in 2023); Women: Sweden (8 titles, the last in 2024)
- Related competitions: Men's World Championship; Women's World Championship
- Website: floorball.sport

Under-19 World Floorball Championships is a tournament for national junior teams from member countries of the International Floorball Federation. It has been held regularly every two years since 2001 for men and since 2004 for women. Men's tournaments take place in even-numbered years, while women's tournaments are held in odd-numbered years. The tournament takes place in February.

The most successful nation in both categories is Sweden, with six titles in the men's competition and eight in the women's.

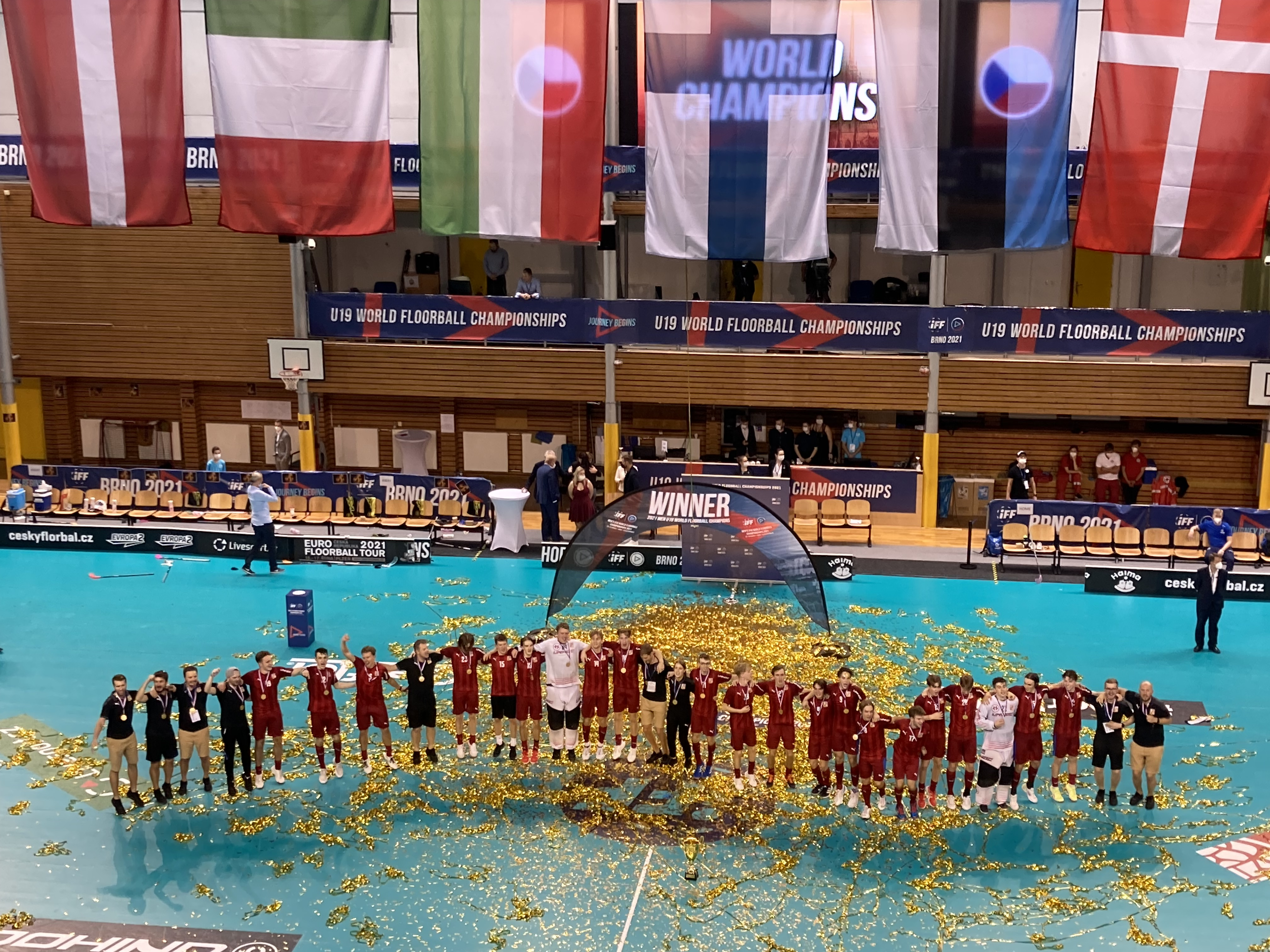
Czech team celebrating the title in 2021 World Championships

At the most recent men's tournament in 2025, Finland won their fifth title. The next edition in 2027 will be held in Latvia. At the most recent women's tournament in 2026, Finland won their third title. The next tournament also in 2027 will be held in Switzerland.

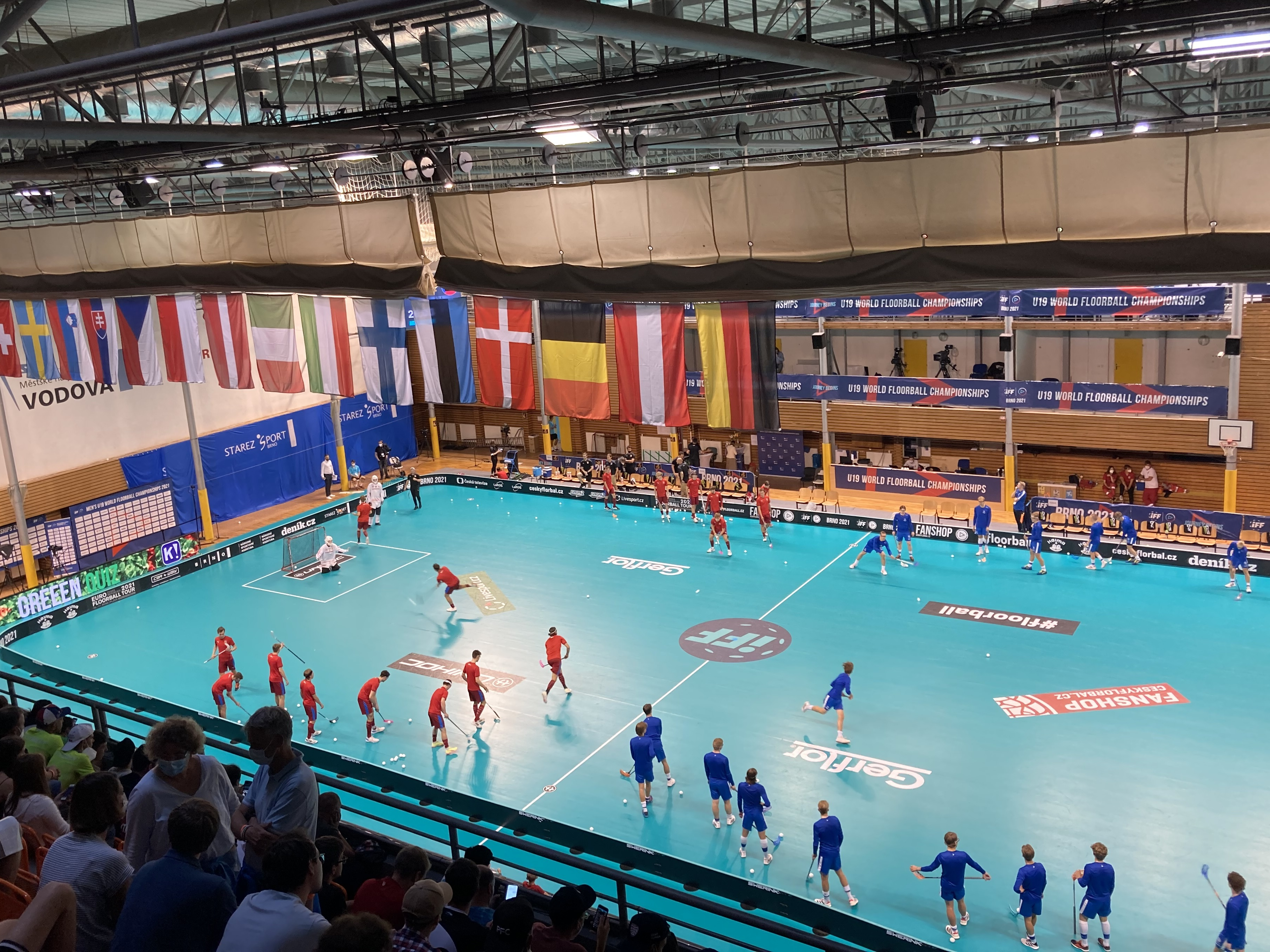
Warm-up before the Finland–Czech Republic final at the 2021 World Championship

== Format ==
There are 16 teams participating in the tournament. The top nine teams from the previous championship automatically qualify, while the remaining seven spots are determined through regional qualifiers. These qualifiers, typically comprising one or more European tournaments and one each for the Americas and Asia-Oceania, take place approximately eight months before the championship. The teams are then drawn into four groups (A–D), each consisting of four teams. Groups A and B are drawn from the highest-ranked teams based on the previous championship results, while Groups C and D include the remaining teams. Within a group, teams play round-robin matches against each other.

The top two teams from Groups A and B advance directly to the semi-finals. The third-placed teams from Groups A and B play each other for fifth place. The fourth-placed teams from Groups A and B face the first-placed teams from Groups C and D, determining which teams will compete for seventh and ninth place, as well as securing spots in the elite groups for the next championship. The remaining teams from Groups C and D play additional placement matches. The entire tournament lasts five to six days, during which teams play three group-stage matches and then one or two placement matches.

== Format history ==
Until the 2019 World Championships, teams were divided into divisions of eight teams each. In Division B, teams competed for promotion to Division A. The team that finished last in Division A was relegated to Division B. The first men's Division B was played at the 2003 Championships, and the first women's Division B was played at the 2006 Championships.

Until 2007, the tournament was held at the turn of October and November. Due to a change in the scheduling of the senior championships to December, starting with the 2008 tournament, the junior championships have been held in May. Starting in 2027, the tournament schedule will shift to February. Additionally, the years for the men's and women's championships will be swapped to ensure that, under the new senior schedule, the U19 championships do not occur in the same year as the adult events. In the transition year of 2027, both the men's and women's U19 championships will be held.

== Men Under-19 World Championships ==
Year	Final venue	Winners	Score	Runners-up	Third place	Score	Fourth place
2001; Details	(Germany); Weißenfels	Sweden	4–2	Switzerland	Finland	7–1	Latvia
2003; Details	(Czech Republic); Prague	Finland	6–2	Sweden	Czech Republic	5–2	Switzerland
2005; Details	(Latvia); Cēsis	Sweden	6–2	Finland	Switzerland	8–3	Latvia
2007; Details	(Switzerland); Kirchberg	Sweden	9–3	Czech Republic	Finland	3–2	Switzerland
2009; Details	(Finland); Turku	Sweden	8–3	Finland	Switzerland	7–1	Czech Republic
2011; Details	(Germany); Weißenfels	Finland	4–3	Sweden	Switzerland	6–4	Czech Republic
2013; Details	(Germany); Hamburg	Sweden	6–2	Switzerland	Finland	8–5	Czech Republic
2015; Details	(Sweden); Helsingborg	Finland	13–3	Switzerland	Czech Republic	7–6	Sweden
2017; Details	(Sweden); Växjö	Finland	7–4	Sweden	Czech Republic	8–5	Switzerland
2019; Details	(Canada); Halifax	Czech Republic	8–2	Sweden	Finland	4–2	Switzerland
2021; Details	(Czech Republic); Brno	Czech Republic	4–3	Finland	Sweden	7–6	Switzerland
2023; Details	(Denmark); Frederikshavn	Sweden	7–4	Switzerland	Finland	7–6 PSO	Czech Republic
2025; Details	(Switzerland); Zurich	Finland	4–3 OT	Czech Republic	Switzerland	4–3 SO	Sweden
2027; Details	(Latvia); Riga						
2028; Details	Singapore						

=== Medal table ===
Rank	Country	Gold	Silver	Bronze	Medals
1	Sweden	6	4	1	11
2	Finland	5	3	5	13
3	Czech Republic	2	2	3	7
4	Switzerland	0	4	4	8
Total		13	13	13	39

=== Participation details ===
Team	(Germany) 2001	(Czech Republic) 2003	(Latvia) 2005	(Switzerland) 2007	(Finland) 2009	(Germany) 2011	(Germany) 2013	(Sweden) 2015	(Sweden) 2017	(Canada) 2019	(Czech Republic) 2021	(Denmark) 2023	(Switzerland) 2025	(Latvia) 2027	(Singapore) 2028	Total
Australia	–	–	–	–	–	–	–	–	–	–	–	14	10	q		3
Austria	–	–	–	–	–	–	–	–	–	–	12	12	–	–		2
Belgium	–	–	–	–	–	–	–	–	–	–	13	–	–	–		1
Canada	–	–	–	–	–	–	–	–	–	–	–	–	16	q		2
Czech Republic	5	3	5	2	4	4	4	3	3	1	1	4	2	q		14
Denmark	8	7	8	–	8	–	8	–	6	7	9	8	8	q		11
Estonia	10	–	–	–	–	8	–	–	–	–	10	13	15	q		5
Finland	3	1	2	3	2	1	3	1	1	3	2	3	1	q		14
Germany	11	–	–	–	–	–	–	–	–	–	6	9	9	q		5
Hungary	12	–	–	–	–	–	–	–	–	–	14	–	–	–		2
Italy	–	–	–	–	–	–	–	–	–	–	15	–	–	–		1
Japan	–	–	–	–	–	–	–	–	–	–	–	–	–	q		1
Latvia	4	6	4	5	5	5	6	7	5	5	5	5	6	q		14
Netherlands	–	–	–	–	–	–	–	–	–	–	–	–	11	–	–	1
Norway	7	5	6	6	6	7	5	8	–	8	–	7	7	q		12
Poland	9	–	7	8	–	–	–	6	8	–	8	10	–	q		8
Russia	6	8	–	–	–	–	–	–	–	–	–	–	–	–		2
Singapore	–	–	–	–	–	–	–	–	–	–	–	15	14	q	q	3
Slovakia	–	–	–	7	7	6	7	5	7	6	7	6	5	q		11
Slovenia	–	–	–	–	–	–	–	–	–	–	11	11	12	–		3
Spain	–	–	–	–	–	–	–	–	–	–	–	–	13	q		2
Sweden	1	2	1	1	1	2	1	4	2	2	3	1	4	q		14
Switzerland	2	4	3	4	3	3	2	2	4	4	4	2	3	q		14
United States	–	–	–	–	–	–	–	–	–	–	–	16	–	–		1

== Women Under-19 World Championships ==
Year	Final venue	Winners	Score	Runners-up	Third place	Score	Fourth place
2004; Details	(Finland); Tampere	Sweden	6–5	Finland	Switzerland	4–3	Latvia
2006; Details	(Germany); Leipzig	Sweden	7–3	Finland	Switzerland	4–3	Czech Republic
2008; Details	(Poland); Zbąszyń	Switzerland	8–7 OT	Sweden	Finland	4–3	Poland
2010; Details	(Czech Republic); Olomouc	Sweden	6–4	Finland	Czech Republic	7–3	Switzerland
2012; Details	(Slovakia); Nitra	Finland	3–1	Switzerland	Sweden	6–3	Czech Republic
2014; Details	(Poland); Zbąszyń	Sweden	6–4	Finland	Czech Republic	5–2	Switzerland
2016; Details	(Canada); Belleville	Sweden	6–3	Finland	Switzerland	3–2	Czech Republic
2018; Details	(Switzerland); St. Gallen	Sweden	7–2	Finland	Czech Republic	3–1	Poland
2020; Details	(Sweden); Uppsala	Finland	5–4 OT	Sweden	Czech Republic	6–2	Switzerland
2022; Details	(Poland); Katowice	Sweden	5–4 OT	Czech Republic	Finland	8–3	Switzerland
2024; Details	(Finland); Lahti	Sweden	4–2	Finland	Czech Republic	5–1	Switzerland
2026; Details	(Italy); Lignano Sabbiadoro	Finland	4–3 OT	Sweden	Czech Republic	6–5 SO	Switzerland
2027; Details	(Switzerland); Winterthur						

=== Medal table ===
Rank	Country	Gold	Silver	Bronze	Medals
1	Sweden	8	3	1	12
2	Finland	3	7	2	12
3	Switzerland	1	1	3	5
4	Czech Republic	0	1	6	7
Total		12	12	12	36

=== Participation details ===
Team	(Finland) 2004	(Germany) 2006	(Poland) 2008	(Czech Republic) 2010	(Slovakia) 2012	(Poland) 2014	(Canada) 2016	(Switzerland) 2018	(Sweden) 2020	(Poland) 2022	(Finland) 2024	(Italy) 2026	(Switzerland) 2027	Total
Australia	–	–	–	–	–	–	–	–	–	15	15	12		3
Austria	–	–	–	–	–	–	–	–	–	14	–	–		1
Canada	–	–	–	–	–	–	–	–	–	16	16	16	–	3
Czech Republic	5	4	5	3	4	3	4	3	3	2	3	3	q	13
Denmark	–	–	–	–	–	–	–	–	–	11	7	7	q	4
Finland	2	2	3	2	1	2	2	2	1	3	2	1	q	13
Germany	7	8	8	–	–	–	–	7	8	9	10	9		8
Hungary	8	11	–	–	7	8	–	–	–	10	14	13		7
Italy	–	–	–	–	–	–	–	–	–	13	12	11		3
Japan	–	–	–	–	–	–	–	–	–	–	–	14		1
Latvia	4	7	7	8	–	7	8	–	5	8	9	8	q	11
New Zealand	–	–	–	–	–	–	–	–	–	12	13	–		2
Norway	6	6	6	6	8	–	5	6	–	7	8	6	q	11
Poland	–	5	4	7	5	6	6	4	6	6	6	10		11
Russia	–	9	10	–	–	–	–	–	9	–	–	–	–	3
Singapore	–	–	–	–	–	–	–	–	–	–	11	15		2
Slovakia	–	10	9	5	6	5	7	8	7	5	5	5	q	12
Sweden	1	1	2	1	3	1	1	1	2	1	1	2	q	13
Switzerland	3	3	1	4	2	4	3	5	4	4	4	4	q	13

== Gallery ==
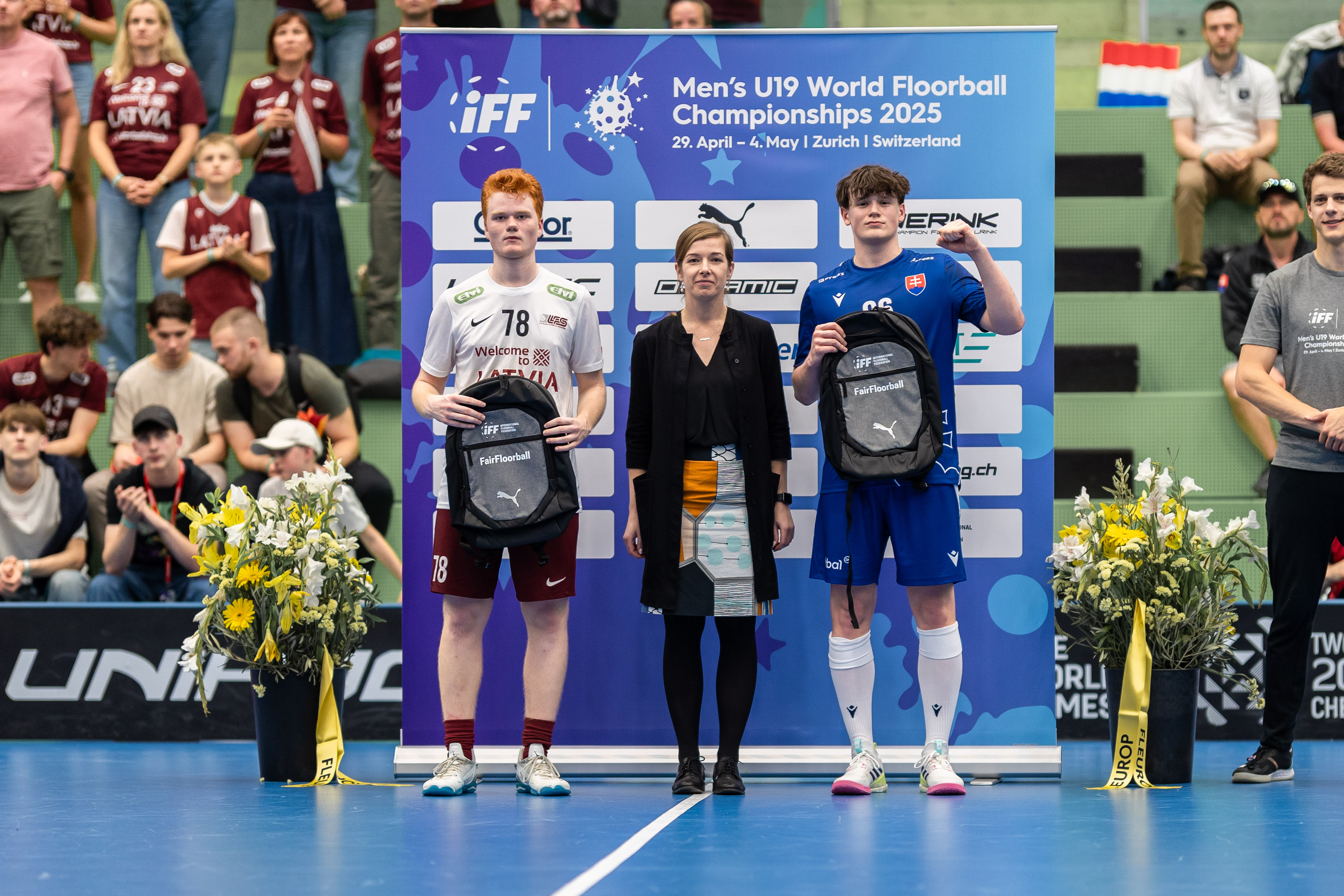
Player of the match awards for the Slovakia–Latvia fifth-place match at the 2025 World Championships

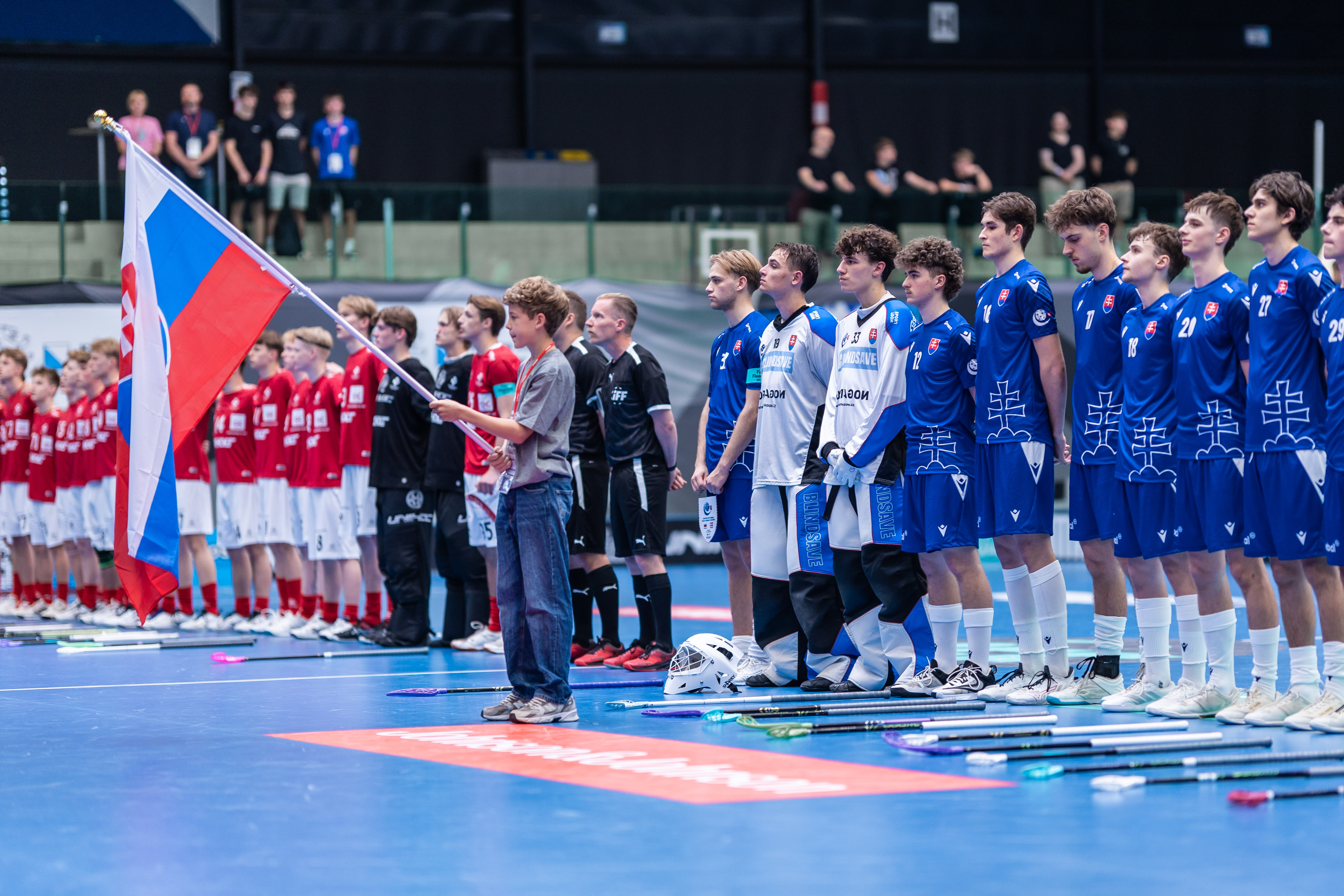
Teams lining up before the Slovakia–Denmark match at the 2025 World Championships

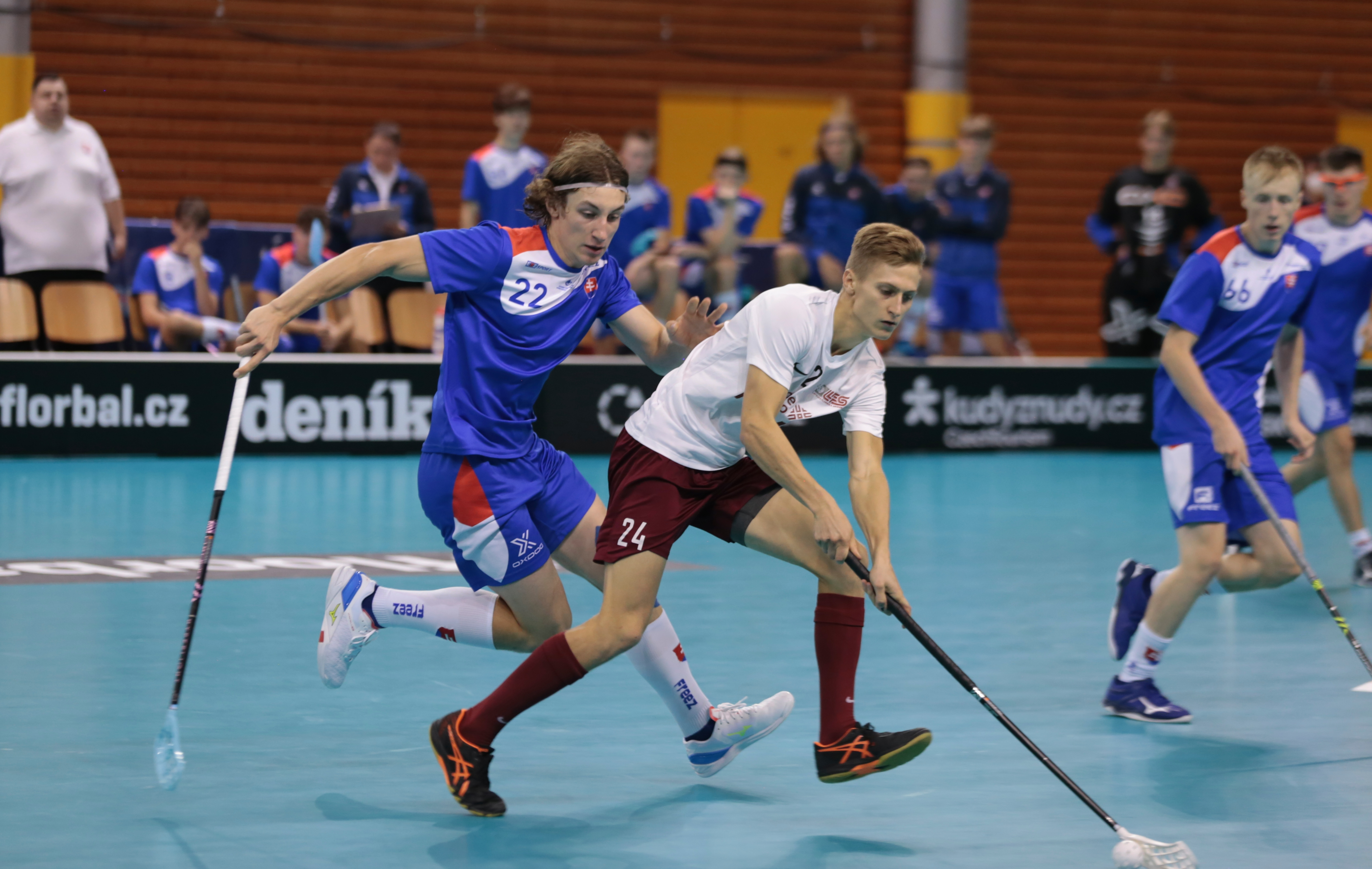
Slovakia–Latvia match at the 2021 World Championships

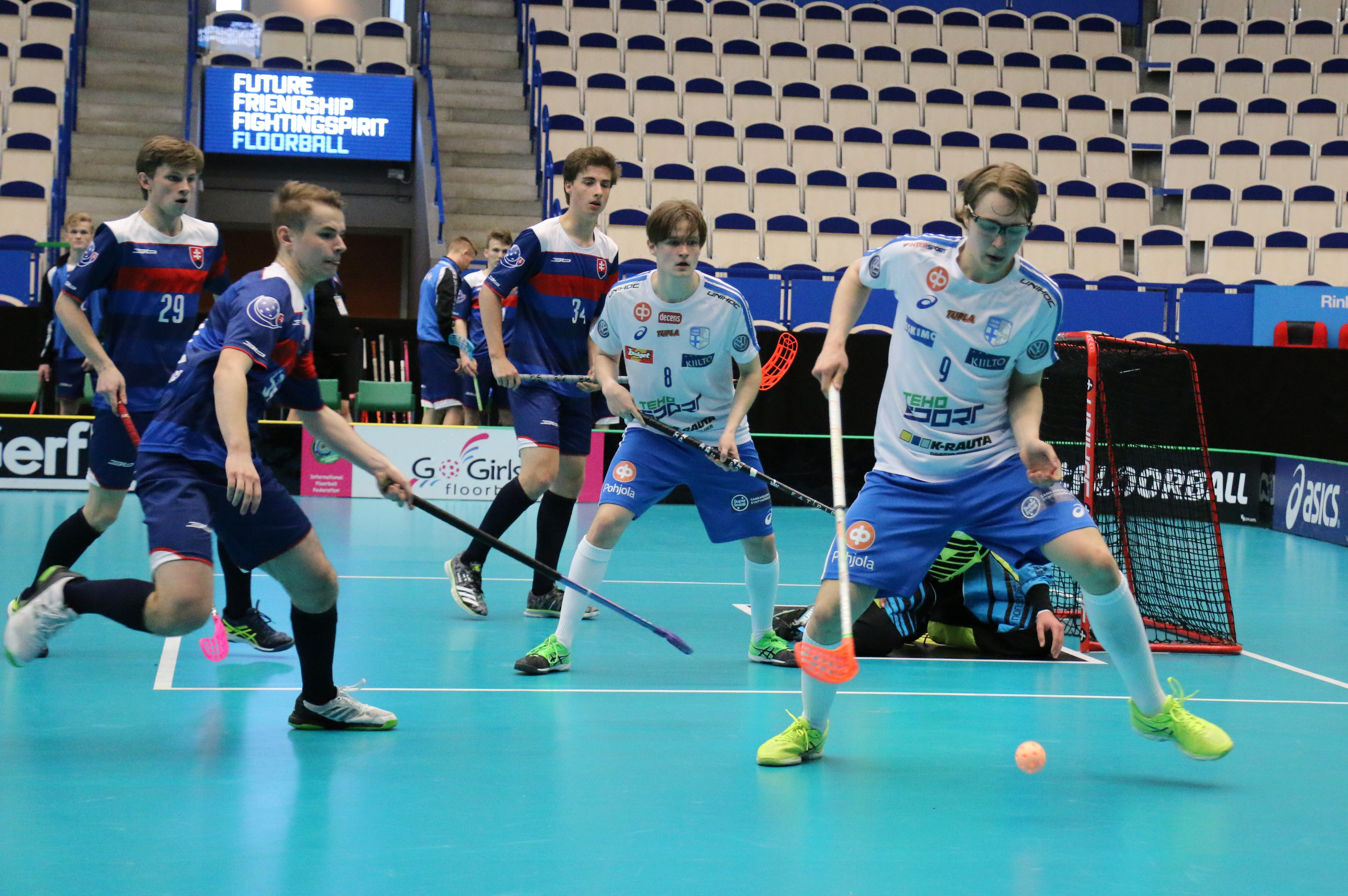
Finland–Slovakia match at the 2017 World Championships

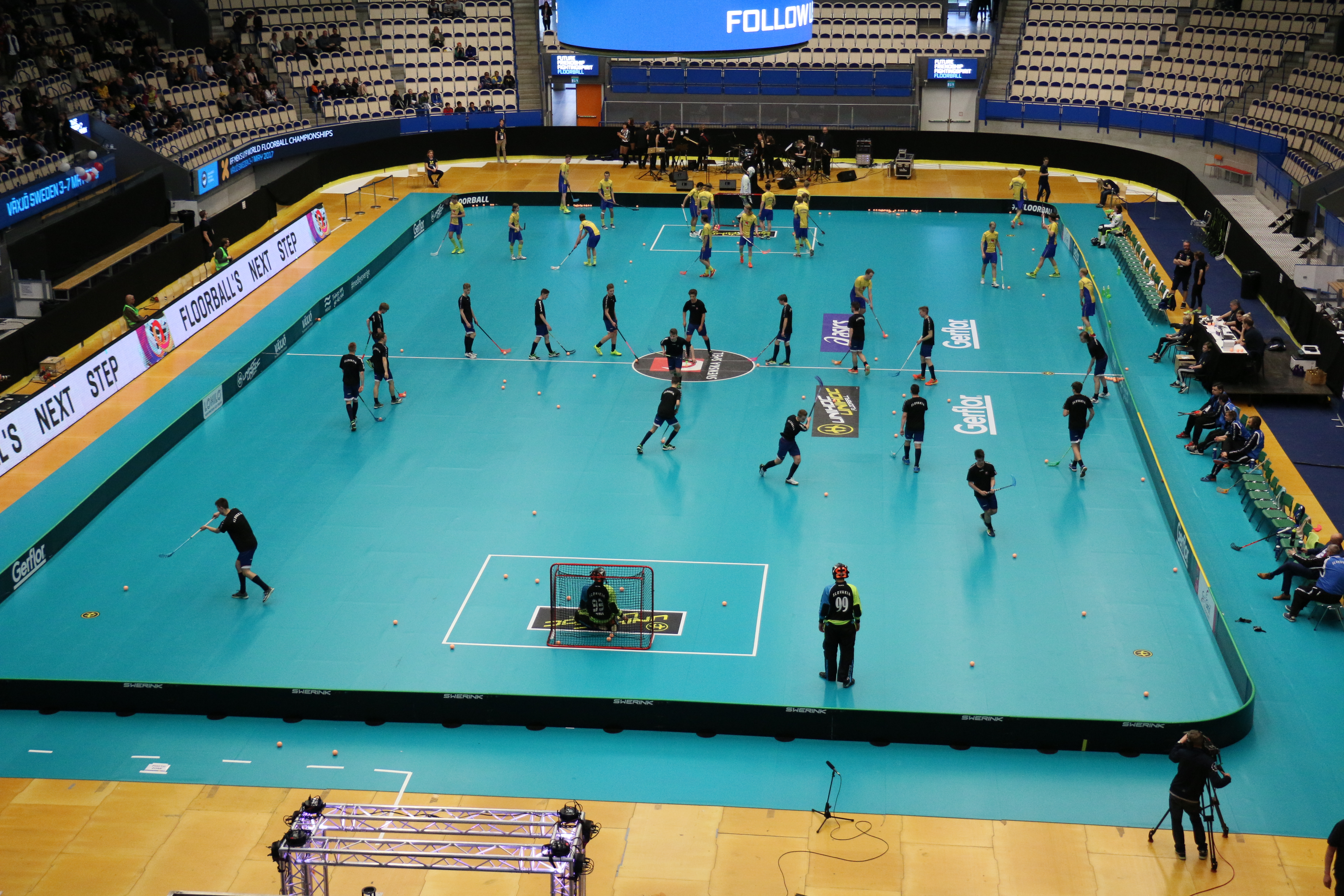
Slovakia–Sweden match at the 2017 World Championships

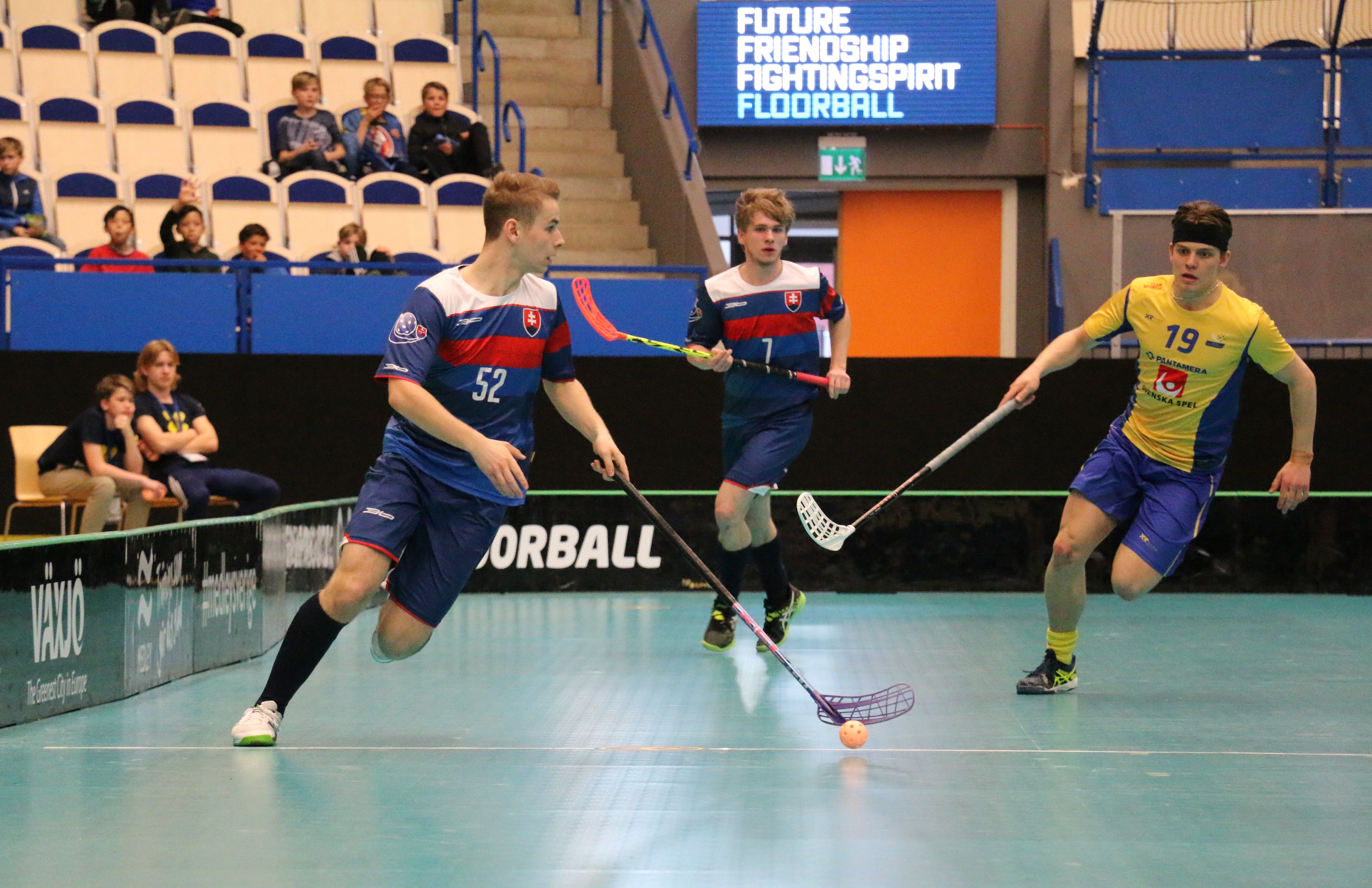
Slovakia–Sweden match at the 2017 World Championships

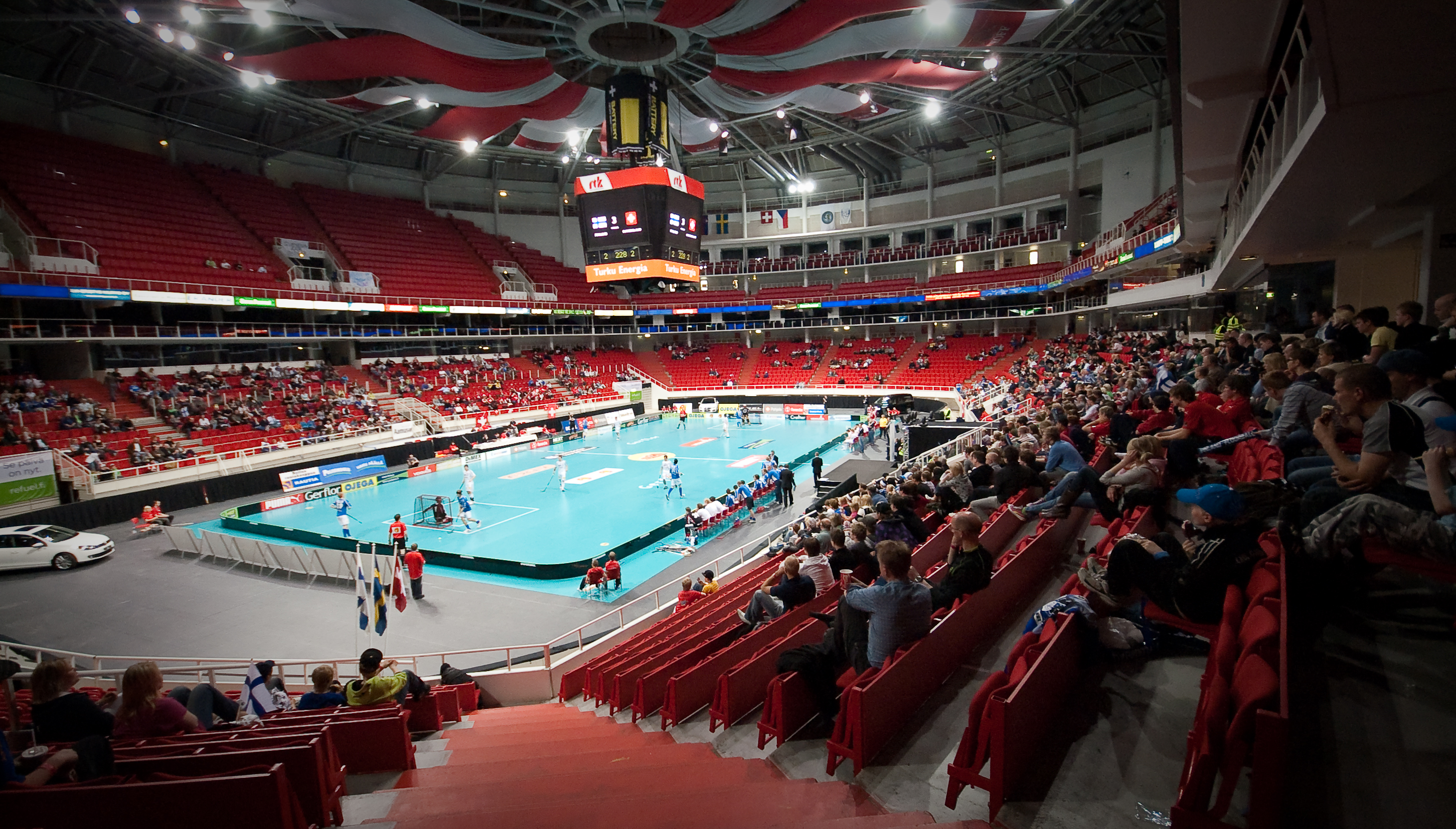
Finland–Switzerland semifinal match at the 2009 World Championships

== See also ==
- List of floorball world champions
- Men's World Floorball Championship
- Women's World Floorball Championship
