= 2026 Women's U-19 World Floorball Championships =

12th edition of the Women's U-19 World Floorball Championships

Tournament details
- Host country: Italy
- Venues: 2 (in 2 host cities)
- Dates: 6–10 May
- Teams: 16

Final positions
- Champions: Finland (3rd title)
- Runners-up: Sweden
- Third place: Czech Republic
- Fourth place: Switzerland

The 2026 Women's U-19 World Floorball Championships were the 12th edition of the Under-19 World Floorball Championships. The tournament took place from 6 to 10 May 2026 in the Italian cities of Lignano Sabbiadoro and Latisana. It was the first time Italy hosted a floorball championship. The final took place in Lignano Sabbiadoro.

Finland claimed their third title after defeating Sweden, the defending champions from the previous tournament, in overtime. The Czech Republic defeated Switzerland in a penalty shootout to secure the bronze medal.

== Host selection ==
- Italy

Italy was the only bid and were awarded the hosting rights on 2 December 2022. This marks the first time Italy hosts a floorball championship.

== Qualification ==
A total of 16 national teams took part in the final tournament.

Eleven teams qualified automatically. These included the host nation Italy. In addition, the nine highest-placed teams from the previous championship in 2024 qualified directly: Sweden, Finland, Czech Republic, Switzerland, Slovakia, Poland, Denmark, Norway, and Latvia. The final seeded team is the only American participant, Canada.

The remaining five places were decided through two regional qualification tournaments. From the Asia–Oceania qualification, held in Perth, Australia, from 8 to 10 January 2026, Singapore, Australia, and Japan qualified. From the European qualification, held in Berlin between 4 and 8 February 2026, Germany and Hungary qualified.

Event	Berths	Qualified	WR	Appearance(s)			Previous best performance
Event	Berths	Qualified	WR	Total	Streak	Last	Previous best performance
Host	1	Italy (H)	12	3	3	2024	12th place (2024)
Automatically qualified	9	Sweden	1	12	12	2024	Champions (2004, 2006, 2010, 2014, 2016, 2018, 2022, 2024)
Automatically qualified	9	Finland	2	12	12	2024	Champions (2012, 2020)
Automatically qualified	9	Czech Republic	3	12	12	2024	Runners-up (2022)
Automatically qualified	9	Switzerland	4	12	12	2024	Champions (2008)
Automatically qualified	9	Slovakia	5	11	9	2024	5th place (2010, 2014, 2022, 2024)
Automatically qualified	9	Poland	6	11	11	2024	4th place (2008, 2018)
Automatically qualified	9	Denmark	7	3	3	2024	7th place (2024)
Automatically qualified	9	Norway	8	10	3	2024	5th place (2016)
Automatically qualified	9	Latvia	9	10	4	2024	4th place (2004)
The only American team	1	Canada	16	3	3	2024	16th place (2022, 2024)
Asian qualification tournament	3	Australia	15	3	3	2024	15th place (2022, 2024)
Asian qualification tournament	3	Japan	25	1	1	–	14th place (2016 – division B)
Asian qualification tournament	3	Singapore	11	2	2	2024	11th place (2024)
European qualification tournament	2	Germany	10	8	5	2024	7th place (2004, 2018)
European qualification tournament	2	Hungary	14	7	3	2024	7th place (2012)

== Venues ==
Latisana and Lignano Sabbiadoro were the venues for the tournament. Both venues had experience hosting other floorball competitions. The teams all stayed in Lignano Sabbiadoro.

Lignano Sabbiadoro	Latisana	2026 Women's U-19 World Floorball Championships is located in Italy
Bella Italia; Capacity: 2,500; Games: 19	Palazzetto dello Sport; Capacity: 800; Games: 17	2026 Women's U-19 World Floorball Championships is located in Italy

== Final draw ==
The final draw was held at 12:00 CET on 16 October 2025 at the CONI Hall of Honour in Rome, Italy. Groups A and B were drawn from the top teams of the previous championship in 2024. Groups C and D were formed from the remaining teams, with some teams drawn blindly as the Asia-Oceania qualification had not yet taken place at the time of the draw.

=== Seeding ===
The seeding was based on the results of the previous championship in 2024.

Pot 1
Team	Rank
Sweden	1
Finland	2
Czech Republic	3
Switzerland	4

Pot 2
Team	Rank
Slovakia	5
Poland	6
Denmark	7
Norway	8

Pot 3
Team	Rank
Latvia	9
Europe 1	N/A
AOFC 1	N/A
Italy (H)	12

Pot 4
Team	Rank
AOFC 2	N/A
Europe 2	N/A
AOFC 3	N/A
Canada	16

== Referees ==
Eight referee pairs were selected on 13 March 2026.

Referees
Czech Republic	Lucie Hejnová; Barbora Beranová
Czech Republic	Václav Patera; Nikola Husáková
Finland	Jussi Kanerva; Janne Virta
Italy	Roland de Combo Pobitzer; Alberto Coduto
Slovenia	Ales Krzic; Tilen Vehovec
Spain	Juan Márin Esponera; Alejandro de Santisteban
Sweden	Daniel Hultberg; Edo Sabanovic
Switzerland	Erik Hasselberg; Christian Friemel

== Tournament format ==
In the group stage, teams play in a round-robin format from 6 to 8 May 2026. A win earns two points, while a draw earns one point. The knockout stage and placement matches will take place on 9 and 10 May.

- The top two teams from Groups A and B advance to the semi-finals of the championship play-offs.
- The third-placed teams from Groups A and B compete for fifth place.
- The fourth-placed teams from Groups A and B, along with the first-placed teams from Groups C and D, enter the semi-finals for placement matches deciding 7th to 10th place.
- The second-placed teams from Groups C and D play for 11th place.
- The third-placed teams from Groups C and D play for 13th place.
- The fourth-placed teams from Groups C and D play for 15th place.

== Preliminary round ==
=== Tiebreakers ===
Teams are ranked according to points (3 points for a win, 1 point for a draw, 0 points for a loss), and if tied on points, the following tiebreaking criteria are applied, in the order given, to determine the rankings:

1. Points in head-to-head matches among tied teams;
2. Goal difference in head-to-head matches among tied teams;
3. Goals scored in head-to-head matches among tied teams;
4. Goal difference in all group matches;
5. Goals scored in all group matches.

If the ranking of one of these teams is determined, the above criteria are consecutively followed until the ranking of all teams is determined. If no ranking can be determined, a drawing of lots will decide the outcome.

=== Group A ===
Pos	Team	Pld	W	D	L	GF	GA	GD	Pts	Qualification
1	Finland	3	3	0	0	40	7	+33	6	Semifinals
2	Sweden	3	2	0	1	21	9	+12	4	Semifinals
3	Norway	3	0	1	2	7	29	−22	1	5th place game
4	Poland	3	0	1	2	5	28	−23	1	7th–10th placement bracket

Updated to match(es) played on 8 May. Source: IFF
Rules for classification: 1) points; 2) head-to-head points; 3) head-to-head goal difference;

6 May 2026; 16:00	Poland	0–10 (0–4, 0–3, 0–3)	Sweden	Palazzetto dello Sport, Latisana; Attendance: 176

Game reference

6 May 2026; 19:00	Finland	18–2 (9–1, 5–0, 4–1)	Norway	Palazzetto dello Sport, Latisana; Attendance: 158

Game reference

7 May 2026; 13:00	Norway	5–5 (4–1, 1–1, 0–3)	Poland	Bella Italia, Lignano Sabbiadoro; Attendance: 203

Game reference

7 May 2026; 16:00	Sweden	5–9 (0–3, 2–4, 3–2)	Finland	Bella Italia, Lignano Sabbiadoro; Attendance: 467

Game reference

8 May 2026; 10:00	Finland	13–0 (8–0, 2–0, 3–0)	Poland	Bella Italia, Lignano Sabbiadoro; Attendance: 271

Game reference

8 May 2026; 19:00	Sweden	6–0 (2–0, 3–0, 1–0)	Norway	Palazzetto dello Sport, Latisana; Attendance: 191

Game reference

=== Group B ===
Pos	Team	Pld	W	D	L	GF	GA	GD	Pts	Qualification
1	Switzerland	3	2	1	0	18	11	+7	5	Semifinals
2	Czech Republic	3	2	0	1	36	9	+27	4	Semifinals
3	Slovakia	3	1	1	1	9	13	−4	3	5th place game
4	Denmark	3	0	0	3	7	37	−30	0	7th–10th placement bracket

Updated to match(es) played on 8 May. Source: IFF
Rules for classification: 1) points; 2) head-to-head points; 3) head-to-head goal difference;

6 May 2026; 10:00	Czech Republic	23–0 (10–0, 2–0, 11–0)	Denmark	Palazzetto dello Sport, Latisana; Attendance: 172

Game reference

6 May 2026; 16:00	Slovakia	2–2 (1–0, 0–0, 1–2)	Switzerland	Bella Italia, Lignano Sabbiadoro; Attendance: 281

Game reference

7 May 2026; 10:00	Czech Republic	8–3 (3–1, 2–1, 3–1)	Slovakia	Bella Italia, Lignano Sabbiadoro; Attendance: 331

Game reference

7 May 2026; 16:00	Switzerland	10–4 (6–1, 2–1, 2–2)	Denmark	Palazzetto dello Sport, Latisana; Attendance: 197

Game reference

8 May 2026; 13:00	Denmark	3–4 (2–1, 1–2, 0–1)	Slovakia	Bella Italia, Lignano Sabbiadoro; Attendance: 346

Game reference

8 May 2026; 16:00	Switzerland	6–5 (2–1, 1–2, 3–2)	Czech Republic	Bella Italia, Lignano Sabbiadoro; Attendance: 489

Game reference

=== Group C ===
Pos	Team	Pld	W	D	L	GF	GA	GD	Pts	Qualification
1	Germany	3	2	1	0	22	5	+17	5	7th–10th placement bracket
2	Italy	3	2	0	1	23	9	+14	4	11th place game
3	Japan	3	1	1	1	17	12	+5	3	13th place game
4	Canada	3	0	0	3	1	37	−36	0	15th place game

Updated to match(es) played on 8 May. Source: IFF
Rules for classification: 1) points; 2) head-to-head points; 3) head-to-head goal difference;

6 May 2026; 13:00	Germany	4–4 (1–1, 2–1, 1–2)	Japan	Palazzetto dello Sport, Latisana; Attendance: 134

Game reference

6 May 2026; 19:00	Canada	0–15 (0–1, 0–8, 0–6)	Italy	Bella Italia, Lignano Sabbiadoro; Attendance: 305

Game reference

7 May 2026; 19:00	Japan	5–7 (0–4, 3–0, 2–3)	Italy	Bella Italia, Lignano Sabbiadoro; Attendance: 213

Game reference

7 May 2026; 19:00	Canada	0–14 (0–4, 0–5, 0–5)	Germany	Palazzetto dello Sport, Latisana; Attendance: 152

Game reference

8 May 2026; 16:00	Japan	8–1 (4–1, 2–0, 2–0)	Canada	Palazzetto dello Sport, Latisana; Attendance: 81

Game reference

8 May 2026; 19:00	Italy	1–4 (1–0, 0–3, 0–1)	Germany	Bella Italia, Lignano Sabbiadoro; Attendance: 337

Game reference

=== Group D ===
Pos	Team	Pld	W	D	L	GF	GA	GD	Pts	Qualification
1	Latvia	3	3	0	0	37	4	+33	6	7th–10th placement bracket
2	Australia	3	1	1	1	14	27	−13	3	11th place game
3	Hungary	3	1	0	2	13	16	−3	2	13th place game
4	Singapore	3	0	1	2	7	24	−17	1	15th place game

Updated to match(es) played on 8 May. Source: IFF
Rules for classification: 1) points; 2) head-to-head points; 3) head-to-head goal difference;

6 May 2026; 10:00	Latvia	17–3 (5–0, 7–2, 5–1)	Australia	Bella Italia, Lignano Sabbiadoro; Attendance: 262

Game reference

6 May 2026; 13:00	Hungary	8–1 (4–0, 4–0, 0–1)	Singapore	Bella Italia, Lignano Sabbiadoro; Attendance: 143

Game reference

7 May 2026; 10:00	Australia	6–5 (2–2, 2–1, 2–2)	Hungary	Palazzetto dello Sport, Latisana; Attendance: 76

Game reference

7 May 2026; 13:00	Singapore	1–11 (0–5, 0–3, 1–3)	Latvia	Palazzetto dello Sport, Latisana; Attendance: 59

Game reference

8 May 2026; 10:00	Singapore	5–5 (0–1, 5–1, 0–3)	Australia	Palazzetto dello Sport, Latisana; Attendance: 68

Game reference

8 May 2026; 13:00	Latvia	9–0 (2–0, 3–0, 4–0)	Hungary	Palazzetto dello Sport, Latisana; Attendance: 63

Game reference

== Placement round ==
=== 15th place game ===
9 May 2026; 10:00	Canada	2–13 (1–4, 1–4, 0–5)	Singapore	Palazzetto dello Sport, Latisana

Game reference

=== 13th place game ===
9 May 2026; 13:00	Japan	4–5 (0–3, 1–2, 3–0)	Hungary	Palazzetto dello Sport, Latisana

Game reference

=== 11th place game ===
9 May 2026; 13:00	Italy	14–9 (3–2, 9–1, 2–6)	Australia	Bella Italia, Lignano Sabbiadoro

Game reference

=== 7th–10th placement play-off ===
==== 7th–10th placement bracket ====
7th–10th semifinals
9 May
Poland	3
Latvia	8
9 May
Denmark	9
Germany	3

7th place
10 May
Latvia	0
Denmark	7
9th place
10 May
Poland	0
Germany	6

==== 7th–10th placement semifinals ====
9 May 2026; 10:00	Poland	3–8 (0–4, 1–1, 2–3)	Latvia	Bella Italia, Lignano Sabbiadoro; Attendance: 112

Game reference

9 May 2026; 16:00	Denmark	9–3 (2–1, 3–1, 4–1)	Germany	Palazzetto dello Sport, Latisana; Attendance: 174

Game reference

==== 9th place game ====
10 May 2026; 10:00	Poland	0–6 (0–0, 0–2, 0–4)	Germany	Bella Italia, Lignano Sabbiadoro; Attendance: 187

Game reference

==== 7th place game ====
10 May 2026; 10:00	Latvia	0–7 (0–1, 0–1, 0–5)	Denmark	Palazzetto dello Sport, Latisana; Attendance: 88

Game reference

=== 5th place game ===
9 May 2026; 19:00	Norway	1–2 SO (0–1, 0–0, 1–0, 0–0); SO: 4–5	Slovakia	Palazzetto dello Sport, Latisana; Attendance: 143

Game reference

== Knockout stage ==
=== Bracket ===
Semifinals
9 May
Finland	6 (OT)
Czech Republic	5
9 May
Switzerland	2
Sweden	5

Final
10 May
Finland	4 (OT)
Sweden	3
Third place
10 May
Czech Republic	6 (SO)
Switzerland	5

=== Semifinals ===
9 May 2026; 16:00	Finland	6–5 OT (0–1, 3–2, 2–2) (OT: 1–0)	Czech Republic	Bella Italia, Lignano Sabbiadoro; Attendance: 425

Game reference

9 May 2026; 19:00	Switzerland	2–5 (1–1, 1–1, 0–3)	Sweden	Bella Italia, Lignano Sabbiadoro; Attendance: 415

Game reference

=== Bronze medal game ===
10 May 2026; 13:00	Czech Republic	6–5 SO (4–2, 1–3, 0–0, 0–0); SO: 2–0	Switzerland	Bella Italia, Lignano Sabbiadoro; Attendance: 580

Game reference

=== Gold medal game ===
10 May 2026; 16:05	Finland	4–3 OT (1–1, 1–0, 1–2, 1–0)	Sweden	Bella Italia, Lignano Sabbiadoro; Attendance: 675

Game reference

== Final standings ==
Gold medal	Finland
Silver medal	Sweden
Bronze medal	Czech Republic
4	Switzerland
5	Slovakia
6	Norway
7	Denmark
8	Latvia
9	Germany
10	Poland
11	Italy
12	Australia
13	Hungary
14	Japan
15	Singapore
16	Canada

== Awards ==
=== Team of the tournament ===
Goalkeeper

- (Slovakia) Daniela Zvarová

Defender

- (Finland) Jenna Potinoja
- (Sweden) Alice Åberg

Centre

- (Czech Republic) Nikola Štekerová

Forward

- (Sweden) Elin Wadell
- (Finland) Vilja Kuutniemi

== Preparations ==
- On 20 November 2025, tickets were released.
