= List of floorball world champions =

This is a List of World Floorball Champions, including runners-up. A World Floorball Championship is awarded to the team which wins in the finals of that year's World Floorball Championships.

- The Men's World Floorball Championships take place every December (since 2008) in every even year.
- The Women's World Floorball Championships take place every December (since 2009) in every odd year.
- The Men's under-19 World Floorball Championships take place every May (since 2009) in every odd year.
- The Women's under-19 World Floorball Championships take place every May (since 2008) in every even year.

A World Floorball Championship is awarded biennially.

== Men's World Floorball Championships ==
| Year | Date | Champions | Runners-up | Score | Location |
|---|---|---|---|---|---|
| 2026 | December 13, 2026 | | | | Tampere |
| 2024 | December 15, 2024 | Finland | Sweden | 5:4 OT | Malmö |
| 2022 | November 13, 2022 | Sweden | Czech Republic | 9:3 | Zurich |
| 2020 | December 11, 2021 | Sweden | Finland | 6:4 | Helsinki |
| 2018 | December 9, 2018 | Finland | Sweden | 6:3 | Prague |
| 2016 | December 11, 2016 | Finland | Sweden | 4:3 PSO | Riga |
| 2014 | December 5, 2014 | Sweden | Finland | 3:2 | Gothenburg |
| 2012 | December 9, 2012 | Sweden | Finland | 11:5 | Zurich |
| 2010 | December 11, 2010 | Finland | Sweden | 6:2 | Helsinki |
| 2008 | December 14, 2008 | Finland | Sweden | 7:6 OT | Prague |
| 2006 | May 28, 2006 | Sweden | Finland | 7:6 OT | Stockholm |
| 2004 | May 23, 2004 | Sweden | Czech Republic | 6:4 | Zurich |
| 2002 | May 25, 2002 | Sweden | Finland | 6:4 | Helsinki |
| 2000 | May 21, 2000 | Sweden | Finland | 5:3 | Oslo |
| 1998 | May 30, 1998 | Sweden | Switzerland | 10:3 | Prague |
| 1996 | May 18, 1996 | Sweden | Finland | 5:0 | Stockholm |

== Women's World Floorball Championships ==
| Year | Date | Champions | Runners-up | Score | Location |
|---|---|---|---|---|---|
| 2025 | December 14, 2025 | Switzerland | Czech Republic | 2:0 | Ostrava |
| 2023 | December 10, 2023 | Sweden | Finland | 6:4 | Singapore |
| 2021 | December 5, 2021 | Sweden | Finland | 4:3OT | Uppsala |
| 2019 | December 15, 2019 | Sweden | Switzerland | 3:2OT | Neuchâtel |
| 2017 | December 09, 2017 | Sweden | Finland | 6:5 PSO | Bratislava |
| 2015 | December 12, 2015 | Sweden | Finland | 5:4 PSO | Tampere |
| 2013 | December 15, 2013 | Sweden | Finland | 5:1 | Ostrava |
| 2011 | December 11, 2011 | Sweden | Finland | 4:2 | St. Gallen |
| 2009 | December 12, 2009 | Sweden | Switzerland | 6:2 | Västerås |
| 2007 | May 19, 2007 | Sweden | Finland | 7:3 | Frederikshavn |
| 2005 | June 5, 2005 | Switzerland | Finland | 4:3 | Singapore City |
| 2003 | May 24, 2003 | Sweden | Switzerland | 8:1 | Bern |
| 2001 | May 27, 2001 | Finland | Sweden | 2:0 | Riga |
| 1999 | May 15, 1999 | Finland | Switzerland | 3:1 | Borlänge |
| 1997 | May 10, 1997 | Sweden | Finland | 4:2 | Mariehamn |

== Men's under-19 World Floorball Championships ==
| Year | Date | Champions | Runners-up | Score | Location |
|---|---|---|---|---|---|
| 2025 | May 4, 2025 | Finland | Czech Republic | 4:3 OT | Zurich |
| 2023 | April 30, 2023 | Sweden | Switzerland | 7:4 | Frederikshavn |
| 2021 | August 29, 2021 | Czech Republic | Finland | 4:3 | Brno |
| 2019 | May 12, 2019 | Czech Republic | Sweden | 8:2 | Halifax |
| 2017 | May 7, 2017 | Finland | Sweden | 7:4 | Växjö |
| 2015 | May 3, 2015 | Finland | Switzerland | 13:3 | Helsingborg |
| 2013 | May 12, 2013 | Sweden | Switzerland | 6:2 | Hamburg |
| 2011 | May 7, 2011 | Finland | Sweden | 4:3 | Weißenfels |
| 2009 | May 10, 2009 | Sweden | Finland | 8:3 | Turku |
| 2007 | November 11, 2007 | Sweden | Czech Republic | 9:3 | Bern |
| 2005 | October 30, 2005 | Sweden | Finland | 6:2 | Cēsis |
| 2003 | November 9, 2003 | Finland | Sweden | 6:2 | Prague |
| 2001 | November 11, 2001 | Sweden | Switzerland | 4:2 | Weissenfels |

== Women's under-19 World Floorball Championships ==
| Year | Date | Champions | Runners-up | Score | Location |
|---|---|---|---|---|---|
| 2026 | May 10, 2026 | Finland | Sweden | 4:3 OT | Lignano Sabbiadoro |
| 2024 | May 12, 2024 | Sweden | Finland | 4:2 | Lahti |
| 2022 | September 4, 2022 | Sweden | Czech Republic | 5:4 PSO | Katowice |
| 2020 | September 5, 2021 | Finland | Sweden | 5:4 OT | Uppsala |
| 2018 | May 6, 2018 | Sweden | Finland | 7:2 | St. Gallen |
| 2016 | May 8, 2016 | Sweden | Finland | 6:3 | Belleville |
| 2014 | May 4, 2014 | Sweden | Finland | 6:4 | Zbąszyń |
| 2012 | May 5, 2012 | Finland | Switzerland | 3:1 | Nitra |
| 2010 | May 8, 2010 | Sweden | Finland | 6:4 | Olomouc |
| 2008 | May 11, 2008 | Switzerland | Sweden | 8:7 OT | Wolsztyn |
| 2006 | November 12, 2006 | Sweden | Finland | 7:3 | Grimma |
| 2004 | November 14, 2004 | Sweden | Finland | 6:5 | Tampere |
