= 2024 Women's U-19 World Floorball Championships =

Floorball competition

Tournament details
- Host country: Finland
- Venues: 2 (in 1 host city)
- Dates: 8–12 May
- Teams: 16

Final positions
- Champions: Sweden (8th title)
- Runners-up: Finland
- Third place: Czech Republic
- Fourth place: Switzerland

Tournament statistics
- Matches played: 36
- Attendance: 15,941 (443 per match)

The 2024 Women's U-19 World Floorball Championships was the 11th edition of the championship. The tournament was played in Lahti, Finland, from 8–12 May.

Sweden defended their title, beating Finland 4–2 in the final.

This edition broke the record for the most attended Women's U-19 World Floorball Championships. The single game record was also broken, with the final attracting 1,965 spectators.

== Bidding process ==
- Australia (withdrew)
- Finland
- Italy (withdrew)

Finland were the only bidders. The Finns were given the hosting rights on 23 February 2021.

== Qualification tournament ==
The European qualification tournament decided the final three places at the championships. The tournament was played in Besançon, France, from 25–27 August 2023.

There were originally two spots on the line at this event but that increased to three after the United States (who had originally qualified automatically for the world championship) withdrew. France made their debut at women's U19 level.

The venue for the qualifying tournament was the Montboucons Gymnasium. The schedule was announced on 23 June 2023.

Pos	Team	Pld	W	D	L	GF	GA	GD	Pts	Qualification
1	Denmark (11)	3	3	0	0	47	4	+43	6	Qualified
2	Italy (13)	3	2	0	1	24	22	+2	4	Qualified
3	Hungary (10)	3	1	0	2	14	32	−18	2	Qualified
4	France (unranked) (H)	3	0	0	3	4	31	−27	0	

Source: IFF
Rules for classification: 1) points; 2) head-to-head points; 3) head-to-head goal difference;
(H) Hosts

25 August 2023; 17:15	Hungary	2–19 (1–5, 0–5, 1–9)	Denmark	Montboucons Gymnasium; Attendance: 163

Game reference

25 August 2023; 20:00	Italy	11–2 (2–1, 5–0, 4–1)	France	Montboucons Gymnasium; Attendance: 240

Game reference

26 August 2023; 11:45	Italy	11–7 (3–3, 6–2, 2–2)	Hungary	Montboucons Gymnasium; Attendance: 145

Game reference

26 August 2023; 14:30	France	0–15 (0–5, 0–7, 0–3)	Denmark	Montboucons Gymnasium; Attendance: 258

Game reference

27 August 2023; 09:00	Denmark	13–2 (2–1, 4–0, 7–1)	Italy	Montboucons Gymnasium; Attendance: 140

Game reference

27 August 2023; 11:45	France	2–5 (0–2, 0–1, 2–2)	Hungary	Montboucons Gymnasium; Attendance: 172

Game reference

== Qualified teams ==
	Date	Venue	Vacancies	Qualified
Automatically qualified			13	Sweden; Czech Republic; Finland; Switzerland; Slovakia; Poland; Norway; Latvia; Germany; New Zealand; Australia; Canada; Singapore
European qualification tournament	25–27 August 2023	(France) Besançon	3	Denmark; Italy; Hungary
Total			16	

== Venues ==
The venues for the tournament are in Lahti at the Lahti Sports and Fair Centre. The facility has two arenas.

Lahti	2024 Women's U-19 World Floorball Championships is located in Finland
Lahti Sports Hall; Capacity: 2,500 (in total) (Note: Lahti Sports Hall used two arenas during the tournament. Arena A has a capacity of 2,000, while Arena B has a capacity of 500.)	2024 Women's U-19 World Floorball Championships is located in Finland

== Squads ==
On 12 April 2024, the team lists were announced.

== Draw ==
The draw took place on 2 September 2023 at 17:15 EET at the Energia Areena in Vantaa during the Nordic Challenge event in Finland.

Pot 1	Pot 2	Pot 3	Pot 4
Sweden (1); Czech Republic (2); Finland (3); Switzerland (4)	Slovakia (5); Poland (6); Norway (7); Latvia (8)	Germany (9); Hungary (10); Denmark (11); New Zealand (12)	Italy (13); Australia (15); Canada (16); Singapore (20)

== Referees ==
Eight referee pairs were selected on 20 February 2024.

Referees
Czech Republic	Barbora Beranová; Lucie Hejnová
Finland	Henrik Snellman; Mona Vänskä
Finland	Jyrki Sirkka; Tom Kirjonen
Singapore	Carmen Teo; Bin Bin Lin
Sweden	Daniel Hultberg; Edo Sabanovic
Switzerland	Erik Hasselberg; Christian Friemel
Switzerland	Davide Rampoldi; Christian Crivelli
Ukraine	Danylo Abelyeashev; Igor Ivanchenko

== Preliminary round ==
The schedule was announced on 6 October 2023. The times of some of the Arena B games were changed on 11 November 2023. Times are EEST (UTC+3).

=== Group A ===
Pos	Team	Pld	W	D	L	GF	GA	GD	Pts	Qualification
1	Czech Republic	3	3	0	0	36	4	+32	6	Semifinals
2	Switzerland	3	2	0	1	14	7	+7	4	Semifinals
3	Slovakia	3	1	0	2	11	24	−13	2	5th place game
4	Latvia	3	0	0	3	6	32	−26	0	Quarterfinal 1

Updated to match(es) played on 10 May 2024. Source: IFF
Rules for classification: 1) points; 2) head-to-head points; 3) head-to-head goal difference;

8 May 2024; 13:30	Latvia	1–8 (0–4, 1–3, 0–1)	Switzerland	Lahti Sports Hall Arena B Attendance: 182

Game reference

Referees:
(Sweden) Daniel Hultberg
(Sweden) Edo Sabanovic

0–1
0–2
0–3
0–4
0–5
0–6
1–6
1–7
1–8

10
Shots
33

8 May 2024; 16:00	Slovakia	1–16 (1–4, 0–5, 0–7)	Czech Republic	Lahti Sports Hall Arena A Attendance: 137

Game reference

Referees:
(Switzerland) Christian Friemel
(Switzerland) Erik Hasselberg

0–1
0–2
0–3
1–3
1–4
1–5
1–6
1–7
1–8
1–9
1–10
1–11
1–12
1–13
1–14
1–15
1–16

9
Shots
66

9 May 2024; 10:00	Slovakia	8–3 (2–2, 1–1, 5–0)	Latvia	Lahti Sports Hall Arena A Attendance: 119

Game reference

Referees:
(Ukraine) Danylo Abelyeashev
(Ukraine) Igor Ivanchenko

0–1
1–1
2–1
2–2
3–2
3–3
4–3
5–3
6–3
7–3
8–3

46
Shots
12

9 May 2024; 13:00	Czech Republic	4–1 (0–1, 1–0, 3–0)	Switzerland	Lahti Sports Hall Arena A Attendance: 860

Game reference

Referees:
(Singapore) Carmen Teo
(Singapore) Bin Bin Lin

0–1
1–1
2–1
3–1
4–1

21
Shots
15

10 May 2024; 10:00	Switzerland	5–2 (2–0, 2–1, 1–1)	Slovakia	Lahti Sports Hall Arena A Attendance: 188

Game reference

Referees:
(Czech Republic) Barbora Beranová
(Czech Republic) Lucie Hejnová

1–0
2–0
3–0
4–0
4–1
4–2
5–2

17
Shots
23

10 May 2024; 19:30	Czech Republic	16–2 (7–2, 4–0, 5–0)	Latvia	Lahti Sports Hall Arena B Attendance: 134

Game reference

Referees:
(Finland) Jyrki Sirkka
(Finland) Tom Kirjonen

0–1
1–1
2–1
3–1
4–1
4–2
5–2
6–2
7–2
8–2
9–2
10–2
11–2
12–2
13–2
14–2
15–2
16–2

47
Shots
7

=== Group B ===
Pos	Team	Pld	W	D	L	GF	GA	GD	Pts	Qualification
1	Sweden	3	3	0	0	34	6	+28	6	Semifinals
2	Finland (H)	3	2	0	1	14	11	+3	4	Semifinals
3	Poland	3	1	0	2	10	22	−12	2	5th place game
4	Norway	3	0	0	3	6	25	−19	0	Quarterfinal 1

Updated to match(es) played on 10 May 2024. Source: IFF
Rules for classification: 1) points; 2) head-to-head points; 3) head-to-head goal difference;
(H) Hosts

8 May 2024; 10:30	Norway	1–16 (0–7, 1–5, 0–4)	Sweden	Lahti Sports Hall Arena B Attendance: 322

Game reference

Referees:
(Singapore) Carmen Teo
(Singapore) Bin Bin Lin

0–1
0–2
0–3
0–4
0–5
0–6
0–7
0–8
0–9
0–10
1–10
1–11
1–12
1–13
1–14
1–15
1–16

6
Shots
45

8 May 2024; 19:00	Poland	2–8 (2–5, 0–0, 0–3)	Finland	Lahti Sports Hall Arena A Attendance: 701

Game reference

Referees:
(Ukraine) Danylo Abelyeashev
(Ukraine) Igor Ivanchenko

1–0
1–1
1–2
1–3
2–3
2–4
2–5
2–6
2–7
2–8

14
Shots
26

9 May 2024; 16:00	Sweden	9–3 (4–1, 3–0, 2–2)	Finland	Lahti Sports Hall Arena A Attendance: 1,407

Game reference

Referees:
(Switzerland) Davide Rampoldi
(Switzerland) Christian Crivelli

1–0
2–0
3–0
3–1
4–1
5–1
6–1
7–1
8–1
8–2
9–2
9–3

26
Shots
21

9 May 2024; 19:00	Norway	5–6 (0–4, 0–0, 5–2)	Poland	Lahti Sports Hall Arena A Attendance: 104

Game reference

Referees:
(Finland) Henrik Snellman
(Finland) Mona Vänskä

0–1
0–2
0–3
0–4
1–4
2–4
3–4
3–5
3–6
4–6
5–6

23
Shots
28

10 May 2024; 16:30	Sweden	9–2 (1–0, 2–0, 6–2)	Poland	Lahti Sports Hall Arena B Attendance: 372

Game reference

Referees:
(Switzerland) Christian Friemel
(Switzerland) Erik Hasselberg

1–0
2–0
3–0
3–1
4–1
4–2
5–2
6–2
7–2
8–2
9–2

50
Shots
6

10 May 2024; 19:00	Finland	3–0 (2–0, 0–0, 1–0)	Norway	Lahti Sports Hall Arena A Attendance: 1,132

Game reference

Referees:
(Sweden) Daniel Hultberg
(Sweden) Edo Sabanovic

1–0
2–0
3–0

28
Shots
6

=== Group C ===
Pos	Team	Pld	W	D	L	GF	GA	GD	Pts	Qualification
1	Germany	3	3	0	0	24	3	+21	6	Quarterfinal 1
2	Singapore	3	2	0	1	13	16	−3	4	11th place game
3	New Zealand	3	1	0	2	14	11	+3	2	13th place game
4	Australia	3	0	0	3	8	29	−21	0	15th place game

Updated to match(es) played on 10 May 2024. Source: IFF
Rules for classification: 1) points; 2) head-to-head points; 3) head-to-head goal difference;

8 May 2024; 10:00	Australia	1–12 (1–5, 0–4, 0–3)	Germany	Lahti Sports Hall Arena A Attendance: 708

Game reference

Referees:
(Finland) Jyrki Sirkka
(Finland) Tom Kirjonen

0–1
1–1
1–2
1–3
1–4
1–5
1–6
1–7
1–8
1–9
1–10
1–11
1–12

14
Shots
41

8 May 2024; 13:00	Singapore	5–3 (2–0, 1–2, 2–1)	New Zealand	Lahti Sports Hall Arena A Attendance: 154

Game reference

Referees:
(Switzerland) Davide Rampoldi
(Switzerland) Christian Crivelli

1–0
2–0
3–0
3–1
3–2
4–2
4–3
5–3

27
Shots
20

9 May 2024; 10:30	Singapore	7–4 (2–1, 2–0, 3–3)	Australia	Lahti Sports Hall Arena B Attendance: 98

Game reference

Referees:
(Sweden) Daniel Hultberg
(Sweden) Edo Sabanovic

1–0
1–1
2–1
3–1
4–1
5–1
6–1
7–1
7–2
7–3
7–4

35
Shots
19

9 May 2024; 13:30	New Zealand	1–3 (0–1, 0–1, 1–1)	Germany	Lahti Sports Hall Arena B Attendance: 194

Game reference

Referees:
(Czech Republic) Barbora Beranová
(Czech Republic) Lucie Hejnová

0–1
0–2
1–2
1–3

12
Shots
25

10 May 2024; 10:30	New Zealand	10–3 (1–0, 6–2, 3–1)	Australia	Lahti Sports Hall Arena B Attendance: 128

Game reference

Referees:
(Finland) Henrik Snellman
(Finland) Mona Vänskä

1–0
2–0
2–1
2–2
3–2
4–2
5–2
6–2
7–2
7–3
8–3
9–3
10–3

23
Shots
22

10 May 2024; 13:30	Germany	9–1 (2–1, 5–0, 2–0)	Singapore	Lahti Sports Hall Arena B Attendance: 166

Game reference

Referees:
(Switzerland) Davide Rampoldi
(Switzerland) Christian Crivelli

1–0
2–0
2–1
3–1
4–1
5–1
6–1
7–1
8–1
9–1

28
Shots
14

=== Group D ===
Pos	Team	Pld	W	D	L	GF	GA	GD	Pts	Qualification
1	Denmark	3	3	0	0	35	8	+27	6	Quarterfinal 1
2	Italy	3	1	1	1	19	15	+4	3	11th place game
3	Hungary	3	1	1	1	13	16	−3	3	13th place game
4	Canada	3	0	0	3	6	34	−28	0	15th place game

Updated to match(es) played on 10 May 2024. Source: IFF
Rules for classification: 1) points; 2) head-to-head points; 3) head-to-head goal difference;

8 May 2024; 16:30	Hungary	8–2 (2–1, 3–1, 3–0)	Canada	Lahti Sports Hall Arena B Attendance: 195

Game reference

Referees:
(Czech Republic) Barbora Beranová
(Czech Republic) Lucie Hejnová

1–0
2–0
2–1
2–2
3–2
4–2
5–2
6–2
7–2
8–2

36
Shots
16

8 May 2024; 19:30	Denmark	9–5 (2–1, 3–1, 4–3)	Italy	Lahti Sports Hall Arena B Attendance: 187

Game reference

Referees:
(Finland) Henrik Snellman
(Finland) Mona Vänskä

1–0
1–1
2–1
2–2
3–2
4–2
5–2
6–2
6–3
7–3
8–3
8–4
8–5
9–5

35
Shots
22

9 May 2024; 16:30	Canada	3–11 (1–3, 1–3, 1–5)	Italy	Lahti Sports Hall Arena B Attendance: 167

Game reference

Referees:
(Finland) Jyrki Sirkka
(Finland) Tom Kirjonen

0–1
0–2
1–2
1–3
1–4
1–5
2–5
2–6
2–7
2–8
2–9
3–9
3–10
3–11

15
Shots
35

9 May 2024; 19:30	Hungary	2–11 (2–3, 0–3, 0–5)	Denmark	Lahti Sports Hall Arena B Attendance: 95

Game reference

Referees:
(Switzerland) Christian Friemel
(Switzerland) Erik Hasselberg

0–1
1–1
2–1
2–2
2–3
2–4
2–5
2–6
2–7
2–8
2–9
2–10
2–11

11
Shots
42

10 May 2024; 13:00	Italy	3–3 (0–1, 2–1, 1–1)	Hungary	Lahti Sports Hall Arena A Attendance: 136

Game reference

Referees:
(Singapore) Carmen Teo
(Singapore) Bin Bin Lin

0–1
0–2
1–2
2–2
3–2
3–3

38
Shots
16

10 May 2024; 16:00	Canada	1–15 (1–5, 0–5, 0–5)	Denmark	Lahti Sports Hall Arena A Attendance: 108

Game reference

Referees:
(Ukraine) Danylo Abelyeashev
(Ukraine) Igor Ivanchenko

0–1
0–2
0–3
0–4
1–4
1–5
1–6
1–7
1–8
1–9
1–10
1–11
1–12
1–13
1–14
1–15

4
Shots
51

== Placement round ==
=== 15th place game ===
15th place game
May 11
Australia	9
Canada	6

==== Australia vs Canada ====
11 May 2024; 10:30	Australia	9–6 (1–1, 5–4, 3–1)	Canada	Lahti Sports Hall Arena B Attendance: 127

Game reference

Referees:
(Singapore) Carmen Teo
(Singapore) Bin Bin Lin

1–0
1–1
1–2
1–3
2–3
3–3
4–3
4–4
4–5
5–5
6–5
6–6
7–6
8–6
9–6

34
Shots
21

=== 13th place game ===
13th place game
May 11
Hungary	6
New Zealand	8

==== New Zealand vs Hungary ====
11 May 2024; 13:30	Hungary	6–8 (3–1, 0–3, 3–4)	New Zealand	Lahti Sports Hall Arena B Attendance: 102

Game reference

Referees:
(Finland) Henrik Snellman
(Finland) Mona Vänskä

1–0
1–1
2–1
3–1
3–2
3–3
3–4
3–5
3–6
4–6
5–6
6–6
6–7
6–8

30
Shots
28

=== 11th place game ===
11th place game
11 May
Singapore	8
Italy	7

==== Singapore vs Italy ====
11 May 2024; 16:30	Singapore	8–7 (6–1, 1–3, 1–3)	Italy	Lahti Sports Hall Arena B Attendance: 112

Game reference

Referees:
(Czech Republic) Barbora Beranová
(Czech Republic) Lucie Hejnová

1–0
2–0
3–0
4–0
5–0
6–0
6–1
6–2
7–2
7–3
7–4
8–4
8–5
8–6
8–7

22
Shots
23

=== Bracket ===
7th–10th semifinals
11 May
Latvia	4
Denmark	5
11 May
Norway	3 (PSO)
Germany	2

7th place
12 May
Denmark	9
Norway	5
9th place
12 May
Latvia	6
Germany	2

==== Latvia vs Denmark ====
11 May 2024; 10:00	Latvia	4–5 (1–2, 1–2, 2–1)	Denmark	Lahti Sports Hall Arena A Attendance: 197

Game reference

Referees:
(Switzerland) Davide Rampoldi
(Switzerland) Christian Crivelli

0–1
0–2
1–2
1–3
1–4
2–4
3–4
4–4
4–5

12
Shots
31

==== Norway vs Germany ====
11 May 2024; 19:00	Norway	3–2 PSO (1–1, 1–1, 0–0) (OT: 0–0) (PSO: 2–1)	Germany	Lahti Sports Hall Arena A Attendance: 163

Game reference

Referees:
(Ukraine) Danylo Abelyeashev
(Ukraine) Igor Ivanchenko

0–1
1–1
2–1
2–2

30
Shots
16

=== 9th place game ===
==== Latvia vs Germany ====
12 May 2024; 10:00	Latvia	6–2 (2–0, 1–1, 3–1)	Germany	Lahti Sports Hall Arena A Attendance: 113

Game reference

Referees:
(Singapore) Carmen Teo
(Singapore) Bin Bin Lin

1–0
2–0
3–0
3–1
4–1
4–2
5–2
6–2

18
Shots
17

=== 7th place game ===
==== Denmark vs Norway ====
12 May 2024; 10:30	Denmark	9–5 (3–1, 4–1, 2–3)	Norway	Lahti Sports Hall Arena B Attendance: 202

Game reference

Referees:
(Czech Republic) Barbora Beranová
(Czech Republic) Lucie Hejnová

1–0
1–1
2–1
3–1
4–1
5–1
6–1
7–1
7–2
8–2
8–3
8–4
8–5
9–5

21
Shots
26

=== 5th place game ===
5th place game
May 11
Slovakia	9
Poland	8

==== Slovakia vs Poland ====
11 May 2024; 19:30	Slovakia	9–8 (5–2, 2–3, 2–3)	Poland	Lahti Sports Hall Arena B Attendance: 147

Game reference

Referees:
(Switzerland) Christian Friemel
(Switzerland) Erik Hasselberg

1–0
2–0
3–0
4–0
5–0
5–1
5–2
6–2
6–3
6–4
7–4
7–5
8–5
8–6
8–7
8–8
9–8

36
Shots
25

== Knockout stage ==
=== Bracket ===
Semifinals
11 May
Sweden	4
Switzerland	3
11 May
Czech Republic	2
Finland	3 (PSO)

Final
12 May
Sweden	4
Finland	2
Third place
12 May
Switzerland	1
Czech Republic	5

=== Semifinals ===
==== Czech Republic vs Finland ====
11 May 2024; 16:00	Czech Republic	2–3 OT (1–0, 0–1, 1–1) (OT: 0–1)	Finland	Lahti Sports Hall Arena A Attendance: 1,705

Game reference

Referees:
(Sweden) Daniel Hultberg
(Sweden) Edo Sabanovic

1–0
1–1
1–2
2–2
2–3

20
Shots
8

==== Sweden vs Switzerland ====
11 May 2024; 13:00	Sweden	4–3 (1–1, 2–0, 1–2)	Switzerland	Lahti Sports Hall Arena A Attendance: 1,347

Game reference

Referees:
(Finland) Jyrki Sirkka
(Finland) Tom Kirjonen

0–1
1–1
2–1
3–1
3–2
4–2
4–3

16
Shots
17

=== Bronze medal game ===
12 May 2024; 13:00	Switzerland	1–5 (0–2, 0–2, 1–1)	Czech Republic	Lahti Sports Hall Arena A Attendance: 1,767

Game reference

Referees:
(Finland) Jyrki Sirkka
(Finland) Tom Kirjonen

0–1
0–2
0–3
0–4
1–4
1–5

10
Shots
19

=== Gold medal game ===
12 May 2024; 16:00	Sweden	4–2 (1–0, 1–0, 2–2)	Finland	Lahti Sports Hall Arena A Attendance: 1,965

Game reference

Referees:
(Switzerland) Christian Friemel
(Switzerland) Erik Hasselberg

1–0
2–0
3–0
4–0
4–1
4–2

19
Shots
22

== Final standings ==
Gold medal	Sweden
Silver medal	Finland
Bronze medal	Czech Republic
4	Switzerland
5	Slovakia
6	Poland
7	Denmark
8	Norway
9	Latvia
10	Germany
11	Singapore
12	Italy
13	New Zealand
14	Hungary
15	Australia
16	Canada

== Awards ==
=== Team of the tournament ===
Goalkeeper

- (Sweden) Louranna Jakobsson

Defender

- (Sweden) Mira Markström
- (Finland) Laura Katajisto

Centre

- (Sweden) Ellen Lundin

Forward

- (Finland) Elsa Holopainen
- (Czech Republic) Karolína Klubalová

== Preparations ==
=== Tickets ===
Ticket sales started on 19 October 2023, but tickets sold slowly. On 24 April 2024, previously sold tournament passes were put back on sale. But on 30 April, 200 tournament passes for the tournament were sold and a new batch of day passes were released.

=== Volunteers ===
The recruitment of volunteers started on 22 November 2023 and ended on 31 January 2024. Although, applications on volunteering for different roles was also announced on 4 April 2024. The organising committee have recruited 150 volunteers.

=== Televising rights ===
Finnish channel, YLE, has greed to televise the matches involving Finland in the tournament.

=== Postponement ===
The tournament was to take place from 1–5 May, but the event dates changed to 8–12 May after a booking problem with the venue delayed the event by a week.

== 3v3 World Championship ==
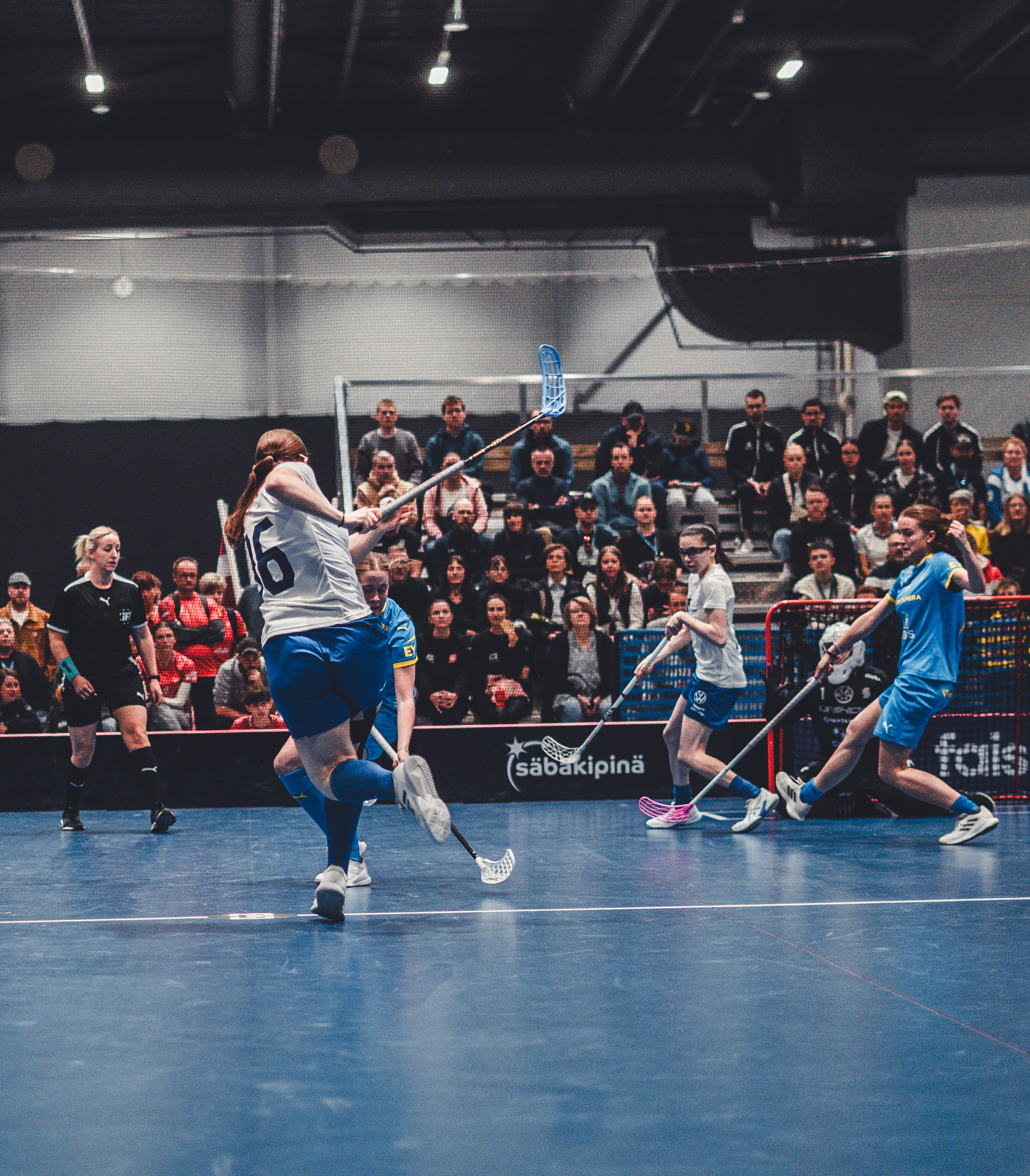
Final match of the women's tournament

The event included the first 3v3 World Floorball Championships 2024, contested by both men's and women's teams. The competitions were held during the final weekend, on 11 and 12 May 2024.

In the men's tournament, 30 teams from 16 European countries, as well as Burkina Faso, India, New Zealand, Ivory Coast, and the United States, took part. The Latvian team won the tournament after defeating Sweden in the final.

In the women's tournament, 14 teams from 12 European countries and India competed. One of the Finnish teams won the tournament, also after defeating Sweden in the final.
