= Canada women's national under-19 floorball team =

Canada Women's U-19 Floorball Team
- Nickname(s): Team Canada
- Founded: 2001
- Manager: Sarah Bernier
- Coach: Sonja Hotke
- First game: (Canada) 4-4 (Latvia); 1 May 2012
- Largest win: (Canada) 20-0 (United States); 21 Aug 2015
- Largest defeat: (Canada) 0-17 (Sweden); 1 May 2016
Home colors	Away colors

The Canada women's national under-19 floorball team is the women's national under-19 floorball team of Canada, and a member of the International Floorball Federation (IFF). Canada's women's under-19 team is currently ranked 16th in the world following their result at the 2024 Women's U-19 World Floorball Championships. Their 10th-place ranking after the 2016 Women's U-19 World Floorball Championships ties the highest ranking achieved by the women's under-19 team at the World Championships.

Canada's main rivals in floorball are the United States.

The Canada National Team is organized by Floorball Canada.

== Roster ==
As of the 2024 Women's U-19 World Floorball Championships

Goalkeepers
Number	Player name	Club
1	Amy Field	(Canada) Infinity Floorball

Defensemen
Number	Player name	Club
7	Emelie Blomqvist	(Sweden) Lindome IBK
8	Kayleigh Garrison	(Canada) Infinity Floorball
15	Julia Britton	(Canada) Infinity Floorball
20	Shirin Laeubli	(Switzerland) Floorball Uri

Forwards
Number	Player name	Club
3	Paige Neklia	(Canada) Infinity Floorball
7	Sophie Pomeroy	(Canada) Infinity Floorball
11	Ella Moser	(Canada) Infinity Floorball
13	Briseis Hunter	(Canada) Floorball League of Ontario
16	Mary Claire Smiley	(Canada) Infinity Floorball
88	Makayla Adams	(Canada) Infinity Floorball

=== Team staff ===
- General manager – Sarah Bernier
- Head coach – Sonja Hotke
- Assistant coach – Fredrik Bagge
- Assistant coach – Steve Broome
- Goalkeeper coach – Richard Curry
- Video coach – Lauri Tourunen
- Physiotherapist – Jani Bjorkholm
- Equipment manager – Ida Hudson

== Rankings and records ==
=== World rankings ===
Year	Rank	Details	Change
2024	16th	16th Final Round	Steady
2022	16th	16th Final Round	NEW
2020	Unranked	Unable to participate due to the COVID-19 pandemic	
2018	13th	5th B-Division	▼3
2016	10th	2nd B-Division	Steady
2014	10th	2nd B-Division	▲2
2012	12th	4th B-Division	NEW

=== All-time World Championship records ===
Year	GP	W	D	L	GF	GA	+/-
(Slovakia) 2012 B-Division	4	1	2	1	23	13	+10
(Poland) 2014 B-Division	4	3	0	1	31	14	+17
(Canada) 2016 B-Division	5	4	0	1	34	19	+15
(Switzerland) 2018 B-Division	4	2	0	2	13	17	-4
(Poland) 2022 Final Round	4	0	0	4	13	31	-18
(Finland) 2024 Final Round	4	0	0	4	12	43	-31
Totals	25	10	2	13	126	137	-11

=== Other international competitions ===
Year	GP	W	D	L	GF	GA	+/-
(United States) 2015 Exhibition	2	2	0	0	35	1	+34
(Canada) 2016 Exhibition	1	0	0	1	0	17	-17
(Austria) 2018 Exhibition	1	1	0	0	5	4	+1
Totals	4	3	0	1	40	22	+18

=== Head-to-head international records ===
Opponent	GP	W	D	L	GF	GA	+/-
Australia	3	1	0	2	14	15	-1
Austria	3	3	0	0	32	6	+26
Denmark	2	0	1	1	5	19	-14
Germany	4	2	0	2	17	19	-2
Hungary	3	0	0	3	10	26	-16
Italy	2	0	0	2	6	16	-10
Japan	1	1	0	0	5	3	+2
Latvia	1	0	1	0	4	4	0
New Zealand	2	1	0	1	5	9	-4
Norway	1	0	0	1	2	7	-5
Russia	1	0	0	1	2	10	-8
Sweden	1	0	0	1	0	17	-17
Thailand	1	1	0	0	9	3	+6
Ukraine	1	1	0	0	10	1	+9
United States	3	3	0	0	45	4	+41
Totals	29	13	2	14	166	159	+7
