= 2020 Women's U-19 World Floorball Championships =

Floorball competition

Tournament details
- Host country: Sweden
- Dates: 1–5 September 2021
- Teams: 9

Final positions
- Champions: Finland
- Runners-up: Sweden
- Third place: Czech Republic

Tournament statistics
- Matches played: 23

The 2020 Women's U-19 World Floorball Championships was the 9th world championships in women's under-19 floorball and held on 1 to 5 September 2021 in Uppsala, Sweden. Originally scheduled to take place on 6 to 10 May 2020, but due to the COVID-19 pandemic, it was rescheduled to 2021.

Finland won their second World Championship ever and the first World Championship since 9 years. In the final Finland won host team Sweden on overtime 5–4. Czech Republic won bronze medal over Switzerland with numbers 6–2.

== Venues ==
Uppsala
IFU Arena

== Qualification ==
	Date	Venue	Vacancies	Qualified
Host nation			1	Sweden
2018 U-19 World Championship Div. A–B	2–6 May 2018	(Switzerland) St. Gallen, Herisau	7	Finland; Germany; Switzerland; Czech Republic; Poland; Slovakia; Latvia
European Qualification	11–15 September 2019	(Italy) Lignano Sabbiadoro	1	Russia

== Tournament groups ==
After the group ballot, 9 teams are divided into 2 groups. In the group stage each team plays each other once, while the second stage of the event includes play-offs and placement matches. The two best teams of group A and B go directly to the semi-final.

== Preliminary round ==
=== Group A ===
Pos	Team	Pld	W	D	L	GF	GA	GD	Pts	Qualification
1	Switzerland	4	3	1	0	17	7	+10	7	Semifinals
2	Finland	4	3	0	1	30	6	+24	6	Semifinals
3	Poland	4	2	0	2	7	11	−4	4	Fifth place game
4	Russia	4	1	0	3	4	16	−12	2	7th–9th place game
5	Germany	4	0	1	3	2	20	−18	1	7th–9th place game

Source: IFF Archived 18 March 2025 at the Wayback Machine
Rules for classification: 1) points; 2) head-to-head points; 3) head-to-head goal difference;

All times are local (UTC+2).

1 September 2021; 9:00	Finland	9–0 (4–0, 3–0, 2–0)	Russia	IFU Arena A, Uppsala; Attendance: 37

Game reference

1 September 2021; 11:30	Poland	1–6 (0–1, 0–2, 1–3)	Switzerland	IFU Arena A, Uppsala; Attendance: 48

Game reference

1 September 2021; 16:45	Germany	1–13 (0–6, 1–4, 0–3)	Finland	IFU Arena A, Uppsala; Attendance: 68

Game reference

1 September 2021; 19:45	Russia	2–6 (2–1, 0–4, 0–1)	Switzerland	IFU Arena B, Uppsala; Attendance: 30

Game reference

2 September 2021; 9:00	Poland	4–0 (2–0, 0–0, 2–0)	Germany	IFU Arena A, Uppsala; Attendance: 28

Game reference

2 September 2021; 11:30	Switzerland	4–3 (2–2, 2–0, 0–1)	Finland	IFU Arena A, Uppsala; Attendance: 93

Game reference

2 September 2021; 16:45	Russia	0–1 (0–0, 0–0, 0–1)	Poland	IFU Arena A, Uppsala; Attendance: 82

Game reference

3 September 2021; 9:00	Switzerland	1–1 (0–0, 0–1, 1–0)	Germany	IFU Arena A, Uppsala; Attendance: 68

Game reference

3 September 2021; 11:30	Finland	5–1 (2–0, 1–1, 2–0)	Poland	IFU Arena A, Uppsala; Attendance: 38

Game reference

3 September 2021; 16:45	Germany	0–2 (0–1, 0–0, 0–1)	Russia	IFU Arena A, Uppsala; Attendance: 73

Game reference

=== Group B ===
Pos	Team	Pld	W	D	L	GF	GA	GD	Pts	Qualification
1	Czech Republic	3	3	0	0	30	5	+25	6	Semifinals
2	Sweden	3	2	0	1	21	7	+14	4	Semifinals
3	Latvia	3	1	0	2	8	36	−28	2	Fifth place game
4	Slovakia	3	0	0	3	10	21	−11	0	7th–9th place game

Source: IFF Archived 20 January 2025 at the Wayback Machine
Rules for classification: 1) points; 2) head-to-head points; 3) head-to-head goal difference;

All times are local (UTC+2).

1 September 2021; 14:00	Czech Republic	16–0 (4–0, 6–0, 6–0)	Latvia	IFU Arena A, Uppsala; Attendance: 27

Game reference

1 September 2021; 19:15	Slovakia	2–4 (0–1, 1–1, 1–2)	Sweden	IFU Arena A, Uppsala; Attendance: 122

Game reference

2 September 2021; 14:00	Czech Republic	10–2 (4–1, 3–0, 3–1)	Slovakia	IFU Arena A, Uppsala; Attendance: 38

Game reference

2 September 2021; 19:15	Latvia	1–14 (1–2, 0–5, 0–7)	Sweden	IFU Arena A, Uppsala; Attendance: 79

Game reference

3 September 2021; 14:00	Latvia	7–6 (3–2, 3–2, 1–2)	Slovakia	IFU Arena A, Uppsala; Attendance: 34

Game reference

3 September 2021; 19:15	Sweden	3–4 (2–0, 0–3, 1–1)	Czech Republic	IFU Arena A, Uppsala; Attendance: 300

Game reference

== Placement round ==
=== 7th–9th place game ===
==== Seventh place game ====
===== Russia vs Slovakia =====
4 September 2021; 10:30	Russia	2–3 (1–1, 0–1, 1–1)	Slovakia	IFU Arena A, Uppsala; Attendance: 38

Game reference

==== Eighth place game ====
===== Russia vs Germany =====
5 September 2021; 9:30	Russia	3–4 (2–1, 0–0, 1–3)	Germany	IFU Arena A, Uppsala

Game reference

=== Fifth place game ===
==== Poland vs Latvia ====
4 September 2021; 19:30	Poland	3–7 (1–0, 1–2, 1–5)	Latvia	IFU Arena A, Uppsala; Attendance: 37

Game reference

== Knock-out stage ==
=== Bracket ===
Semifinals
4 September
A1 Switzerland	5
B2 Sweden	9
4 September
B1 Czech Republic	2
A2 Finland	5

Final
5 September
W1 Sweden	4
W2 Finland	5
Third place
5 September
L1 Switzerland	2
L2 Czech Republic	6

=== Semifinals ===
==== Czech Republic vs Finland ====
4 September 2021; 13:30	Czech Republic	2–5 (0–2, 1–0, 1–3)	Finland	IFU Arena A, Uppsala; Attendance: 214

Game reference

==== Switzerland vs Sweden ====
4 September 2021; 16:30	Switzerland	5–9 (1–2, 1–5, 3–2)	Sweden	IFU Arena A, Uppsala; Attendance: 300

Game reference

=== Bronze medal game ===
5 September 2021; 12:30	Switzerland	2–6 (1–0, 0–3, 1–3)	Czech Republic	IFU Arena A, Uppsala

Game reference

=== Gold medal game ===
5 September 2021; 15:30	Sweden	4–5 OT (1–1, 1–1, 2–2, 0–1)	Finland	IFU Arena A, Uppsala; Attendance: 300

Game reference

== Final standings ==
Gold medal	Finland
Silver medal	Sweden
Bronze medal	Czech Republic
4	Switzerland
5	Latvia
6	Poland
7	Slovakia
8	Germany
9	Russia

== Team of the tournament ==
Goalkeeper

- (Czech Republic) Viktorie Karasová

Defender

- (Finland) Ulla Valtola
- (Czech Republic) Vanessa Rebecca Keprtová

Centre

- (Sweden) Nellie Öhgren

Forward

- (Finland) Suvi Hämäläinen
- (Sweden) Maja Viström
