= 2022 Women's U-19 World Floorball Championships =

Floorball competition

Tournament details
- Host country: Poland
- Dates: 31 August – 4 September
- Teams: 16

Final positions
- Champions: Sweden
- Runners-up: Czech Republic
- Third place: Finland

Tournament statistics
- Matches played: 36

The 2022 Women's U-19 World Floorball Championships will be the 10th world championship in women's under-19 floorball. The tournament will be played in Katowice, Poland, and will take place from 31 August to 4 September, 2022. The event was originally scheduled to be played in New Zealand on 4–8 May 2022 but due to COVID-19 pandemic in New Zealand, it was rescheduled to August and September 2022.

== Qualification ==
A total of 18 teams registered for the event. 14 automatically qualified for the final round, and the final two spots were decided in a four team qualifier.

	Date	Venue	Participants	Vacancies	Qualified
Qualifying Round	8–11 September 2021	(Estonia) Saku	Denmark; Estonia; Hungary; Italy	2	Denmark; Hungary
Wild Card Replacements	8 August 2022	—	—	3	Austria; Italy; Latvia

1. Russia was suspended, hence their withdrawal from the competition.
2. the IFF Central Board confirmed the inclusion of Italy to replace of Russia
3. Singapore withdrawal Under 19 replace of Austria

== Venues ==
Katowice
Brynow Arena	Szopienice Arena

== Groups ==
Group A	Group B	Group C	Group D
Finland Switzerland Germany Poland (hosts)	Sweden Czech Republic Norway Slovakia	Canada New Zealand Hungary Italy	Australia Latvia Denmark Austria

== Preliminary round ==
=== Group A ===
Pos	Team	Pld	W	D	L	GF	GA	GD	Pts	Qualification
1	Switzerland	3	3	0	0	32	3	+29	6	Semifinals
2	Finland	3	2	0	1	21	9	+12	4	Semifinals
3	Poland	3	1	0	2	8	17	−9	2	5th place game
4	Germany	3	0	0	3	1	33	−32	0	Quarterfinal 1

Rules for classification: 1) points; 2) head-to-head points; 3) head-to-head goal difference;

31 August 2022; 10:00	Switzerland	16–0 (4–0, 4–0, 8–0)	Germany	Szopienice Arena, Katowice; Attendance: 175

Game reference

31 August 2022; 19:00	Finland	9–0 (2–0, 3–0, 4–0)	Poland	Szopienice Arena, Katowice; Attendance: 232

Game reference

1 September 2022; 16:00	Finland	2–9 (2–0, 0–3, 0–6)	Switzerland	Szopienice Arena, Katowice; Attendance: 282

Game reference

1 September 2022; 19:00	Poland	7–1 (2–0, 2–1, 3–0)	Germany	Szopienice Arena, Katowice; Attendance: 289

Game reference

2 September 2022; 13:00	Germany	0–10 (0–6, 0–2, 0–2)	Finland	Szopienice Arena, Katowice; Attendance: 170

Game reference

2 September 2022; 19:00	Switzerland	7–1 (2–1, 4–0, 1–0)	Poland	Szopienice Arena, Katowice; Attendance: 395

Game reference

=== Group B ===
Pos	Team	Pld	W	D	L	GF	GA	GD	Pts	Qualification
1	Sweden	3	3	0	0	34	6	+28	6	Semifinals
2	Czech Republic	3	2	0	1	19	13	+6	4	Semifinals
3	Slovakia	3	0	1	2	13	24	−11	1	5th place game
4	Norway	3	0	1	2	9	32	−23	1	Quarterfinal 2

Rules for classification: 1) points; 2) head-to-head points; 3) head-to-head goal difference;

31 August 2022; 13:00	Sweden	19–1 (6–0, 2–1, 11–0)	Norway	Szopienice Arena, Katowice; Attendance: 232

Game reference

31 August 2022; 16:00	Czech Republic	8–6 (5–3, 1–1, 2–2)	Slovakia	Szopienice Arena, Katowice; Attendance: 175

Game reference

1 September 2022; 10:00	Norway	5–5 (0–3, 5–1, 0–1)	Slovakia	Szopienice Arena, Katowice; Attendance: 266

Game reference

1 September 2022; 13:00	Sweden	4–3 (0–2, 2–0, 2–1)	Czech Republic	Szopienice Arena, Katowice; Attendance: 298

Game reference

2 September 2022; 10:00	Slovakia	2–11 (1–3, 0–5, 1–3)	Sweden	Szopienice Arena, Katowice; Attendance: 253

Game reference

2 September 2022; 16:00	Czech Republic	8–3 (2–1, 2–1, 4–1)	Norway	Szopienice Arena, Katowice; Attendance: 193

Game reference

=== Group C ===
Pos	Team	Pld	W	D	L	GF	GA	GD	Pts	Qualification
1	Hungary	3	2	1	0	29	17	+12	5	Quarterfinal 1
2	New Zealand	3	2	1	0	18	9	+9	5	11th place game
3	Italy	3	1	0	2	16	21	−5	2	13th place game
4	Canada	3	0	0	3	10	26	−16	0	15th place game

Rules for classification: 1) points; 2) head-to-head points; 3) head-to-head goal difference;

31 August 2022; 13:00	Canada	2–8 (1–1, 0–4, 1–3)	New Zealand	Brynow Arena, Katowice; Attendance: 65

Game reference

31 August 2022; 16:00	Hungary	12–8 (4–1, 1–2, 7–5)	Italy	Brynow Arena, Katowice; Attendance: 97

Game reference

1 September 2022; 10:00	Canada	5–13 (1–3, 3–6, 1–4)	Hungary	Brynow Arena, Katowice; Attendance: 62

Game reference

1 September 2022; 13:00	New Zealand	6–3 (1–1, 3–0, 2–2)	Italy	Brynow Arena, Katowice; Attendance: 52

Game reference

2 September 2022; 10:00	New Zealand	4–4 (2–1, 0–1, 2–2)	Hungary	Brynow Arena, Katowice; Attendance: 145

Game reference

2 September 2022; 19:00	Italy	5–3 (0–2, 4–0, 1–1)	Canada	Brynow Arena, Katowice; Attendance: 102

Game reference

=== Group D ===
Pos	Team	Pld	W	D	L	GF	GA	GD	Pts	Qualification
1	Latvia	3	3	0	0	34	4	+30	6	Quarterfinal 2
2	Denmark	3	2	0	1	12	10	+2	4	11th place game
3	Austria	3	1	0	2	4	22	−18	2	13th place game
4	Australia	3	0	0	3	5	19	−14	0	15th place game

Rules for classification: 1) points; 2) head-to-head points; 3) head-to-head goal difference;

31 August 2022; 10:00	Denmark	6–0 (2–0, 2–0, 2–0)	Austria	Brynow Arena, Katowice; Attendance: 86

Game reference

31 August 2022; 19:00	Australia	2–11 (1–6, 1–1, 0–4)	Latvia	Brynow Arena, Katowice; Attendance: 73

Game reference

1 September 2022; 16:00	Latvia	15–2 (4–0, 5–2, 6–0)	Austria	Brynow Arena, Katowice; Attendance: 52

Game reference

1 September 2022; 19:00	Australia	2–6 (1–0, 0–3, 1–3)	Denmark	Brynow Arena, Katowice; Attendance: 67

Game reference

2 September 2022; 13:00	Austria	2–1 (0–0, 1–0, 1–1)	Australia	Brynow Arena, Katowice; Attendance: 137

Game reference

2 September 2022; 16:00	Latvia	8–0 (1–0, 3–0, 4–0)	Denmark	Brynow Arena, Katowice; Attendance: 152

Game reference

== Placement round ==
=== Quarterfinal 1 ===
==== Germany vs Latvia ====
3 September 2022; 19:00	Germany	0–4 (0–3, 0–1, 0–0)	Latvia	Szopienice Arena, Katowice; Attendance: 74

Game reference

=== Quarterfinal 2 ===
==== Norway vs Hungary ====
3 September 2022; 10:00	Norway	19–3 (7–0, 6–1, 6–2)	Hungary	Szopienice Arena, Katowice; Attendance: 154

Game reference

=== 5th place game ===
==== Poland vs Slovakia ====
3 September 2022; 19:00	Poland	4–5 (1–1, 1–3, 2–1)	Slovakia	Brynow Arena, Katowice; Attendance: 253

Game reference

=== 7th place game ===
==== Latvia vs Norway ====
4 September 2022; 10:00	Latvia	0–5 (0–1, 0–1, 0–3)	Norway	Brynow Arena, Katowice; Attendance: 78

Game reference

=== 9th place game ===
==== Germany vs Hungary ====
4 September 2022; 10:00	Germany	7–5 (2–3, 0–0, 5–2)	Hungary	Szopienice Arena, Katowice; Attendance: 73

Game reference

=== 11th place game ===
==== New Zealand vs Denmark ====
3 September 2022; 16:00	New Zealand	4–5 (1–1, 1–1, 2–3)	Denmark	Brynow Arena, Katowice; Attendance: 60

Game reference

=== 13th place game ===
==== Austria vs Italy ====
3 September 2022; 13:00	Austria	1–5 (1–0, 0–3, 6–1)	Italy	Brynow Arena, Katowice; Attendance: 51

Game reference

=== 15th place game ===
==== Canada vs Australia ====
3 September 2022; 10:00	Canada	3–5 (2–2, 1–1, 0–2)	Australia	Brynow Arena, Katowice; Attendance: 52

Game reference

== Knock-out stage ==
=== Bracket ===
Semifinals
3 September
Switzerland	4
Czech Republic	5 ps.
3 September
Sweden	8
Finland	3

Final
4 September
Czech Republic	4
Sweden	5
Third place
4 September
Switzerland	3
Finland	8

=== Semifinals ===
==== Switzerland vs Czech Republic ====
3 September 2022; 13:00	Switzerland	4–5 ps. (1–1, 1–1, 2–2, 0–0, 0–2)	Czech Republic	Szopienice Arena, Katowice; Attendance: 327

Game reference

==== Sweden vs Finland ====
3 September 2022; 16:00	Sweden	8–3 (4–1, 2–1, 2–1)	Finland	Szopienice Arena, Katowice; Attendance: 492

Game reference

=== Bronze medal game ===
4 September 2022; 13:00	Switzerland	3–8 (0–2, 1–2, 2–4)	Finland	Szopienice Arena, Katowice; Attendance: 719

Game reference

=== Gold medal game ===
4 September 2022; 16:00	Czech Republic	4–5 ps. (0–3, 2–1, 2–0, 0–0, 1–2)	Sweden	Szopienice Arena, Katowice; Attendance: 923

Game reference

== Final standings ==
Gold medal	Sweden
Silver medal	Czech Republic
Bronze medal	Finland
4	Switzerland
5	Slovakia
6	Poland
7	Norway
8	Latvia
9	Germany
10	Hungary
11	Denmark
12	New Zealand
13	Italy
14	Austria
15	Australia
16	Canada
