= Czech Republic men's national under-19 floorball team =

Youth floorball team representing the Czech Republic

Czech Republic men's under-19 national floorball team
- Founded: 2001
- Coach: (Czech Republic) Ladislav Štancl
- IFF Ranking: 2nd (2025)
- First game: Czech Republic 3–7 Finland (6 November 2001)
- Largest win: Czech Republic 22–0 Germany (13 September 2009)
- Largest defeat: Czech Republic 5–25 Finland (28 April 2012)
- Championships: 2 World Championships (2019, 2021)

Medal record

U-19 World Championships
Gold medal – first place	2019 Canada	
Gold medal – first place	2021 Czech Republic	
Silver medal – second place	2007 Switzerland	
Silver medal – second place	2025 Switzerland	
Bronze medal – third place	2003 Czech Republic	
Bronze medal – third place	2015 Sweden	
Bronze medal – third place	2017 Sweden	

The Czech Republic men's under-19 national floorball team is the men's under-19 national floorball team of the Czech Republic, and a member of the International Floorball Federation. The team is composed of the best Czech floorball players under the age of 19. The current national team coach, since 2023, is Ladislav Štancl.

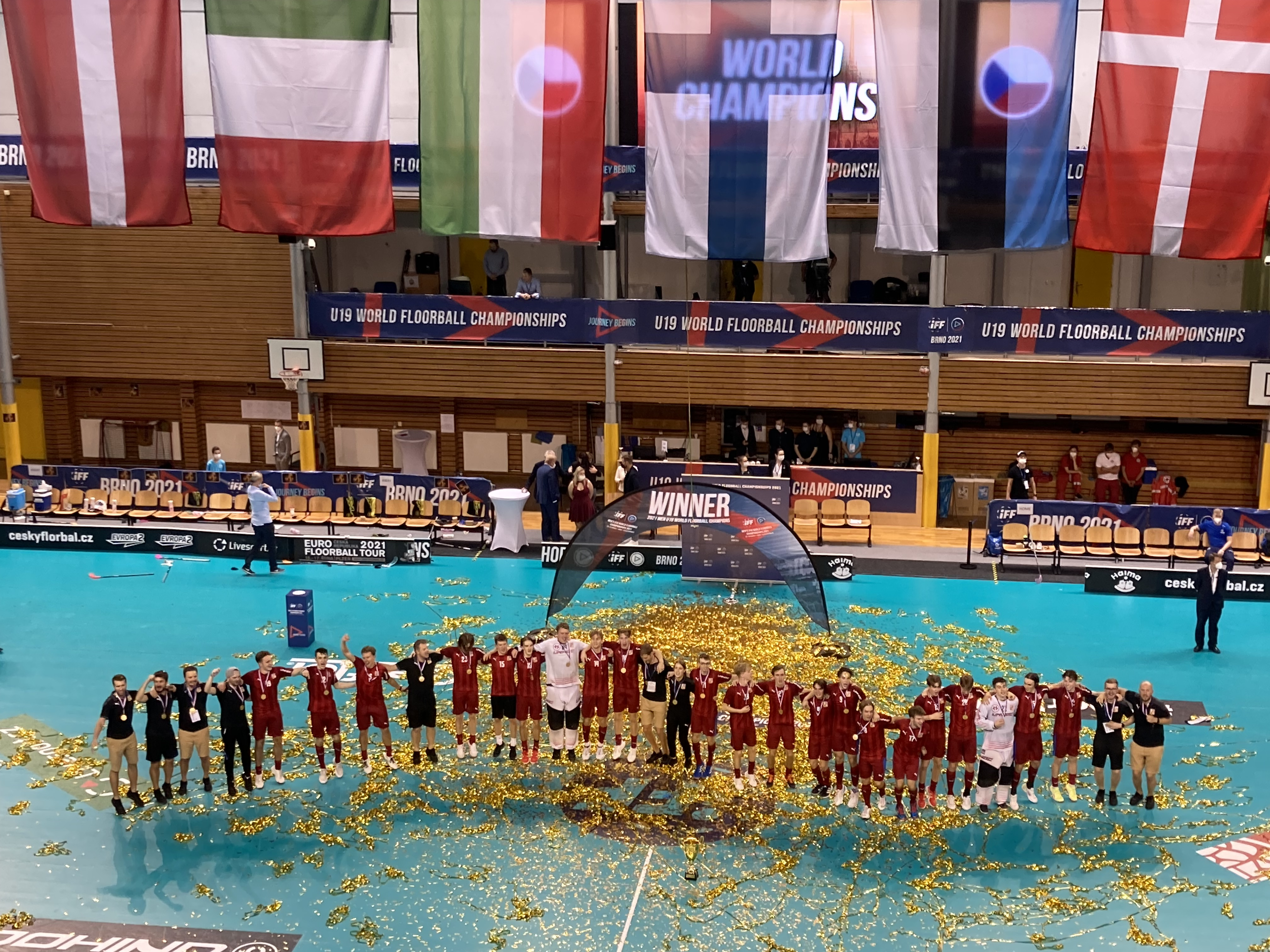
The Czech junior team celebrates defending their championship title at the home tournament in 2021.

The team has participated in all editions of the Men's Under-19 World Floorball Championships. With two titles, in 2019 and 2021, it is the third most successful men's junior national team, behind Sweden and Finland. At the most recent tournament in 2025, they finished in second place.

The Czech junior team in friendly match in 2021.

== World Championships record ==
Year	Hosting country	Rank	Decisive match
2001	Germany	5th place	Russia 5 : 0
2003	Czech Republic	3rd place	Switzerland 5 : 2
2005	Latvia	5th place	Norway 8 : 2
2007	Switzerland	2nd place	Sweden 3 : 9
2009	Finland	4th place	Switzerland 1 : 7
2011	Germany	4th place	Switzerland 4 : 6
2013	Germany	4th place	Finland 5 : 8
2015	Sweden	3rd place	Sweden 7 : 6
2017	Sweden	3rd place	Switzerland 8 : 5
2019	Canada	1st place	Sweden 8 : 2
2021	Czech Republic	1st place	Finland 4 : 3
2023	Denmark	4th place	Finland 6 : 7pn
2025	Switzerland	2nd place	Finland 3 : 4pp

The Czech junior team before friendly match in 2021.

== All-time world championships results ==
Year	Position	GP	W	D	L	GF	GA	+/-
(Germany) 2001	5th	6	4	0	2	34	15	+19
(Czech Republic) 2003	3rd	5	3	0	2	26	19	+7
(Latvia) 2005	5th	4	2	0	2	18	14	+4
(Switzerland) 2007	2nd	5	3	0	2	30	31	–1
(Finland) 2009	4th	5	2	0	3	35	24	+11
(Germany) 2011	4th	5	2	0	3	52	34	+18
(Germany) 2013	4th	5	2	0	3	37	26	+11
(Sweden) 2015	3rd	5	3	0	2	36	21	+15
(Sweden) 2017	3rd	5	4	0	1	47	29	+18
(Canada) 2019	1st	5	5	0	0	41	12	+29
(Czech Republic) 2021	1st	5	4	0	1	38	15	+23
Total:		55	34	0	21	394	240	+154

== See also ==
- Czech Republic men's national floorball team
- Czech Republic women's national floorball team
- Czech Republic women's national under-19 floorball team
