= Czech Republic women's national under-19 floorball team =

Youth floorball team representing the Czech Republic

- Coach: Martin Czeczinkar
- IFF Ranking: 3rd (2026)

Medal record

U-19 World Championships
Silver medal – second place	2022 Poland	
Bronze medal – third place	2010 Czech Republic	
Bronze medal – third place	2014 Poland	
Bronze medal – third place	2018 Switzerland	
Bronze medal – third place	2020 Sweden	
Bronze medal – third place	2024 Finland	
Bronze medal – third place	2026 Italy	

Czech Republic women's national under-19 floorball team is the women's under-19 national floorball team of the Czech Republic.

The team finished third at the last championships in 2024. They achieved their best finish at the championships in 2022 where they reached the final for the first time in history. This makes the team the fourth most successful women's junior national team. At the most recent tournament in 2026, they finished in third place.

== World Championships ==
Year	Hosting country	Position	Decisive match
2004	Finland	5th place	Norway 8 : 1
2006	Germany	4th place	Switzerland 3 : 4
2008	Poland	5th place	Norway 4 : 1
2010	Czech Republic	3rd place	Switzerland 7 : 3
2012	Slovakia	4th place	Sweden 3 : 6
2014	Poland	3rd place	Switzerland 5 : 2
2016	Canada	4th place	Switzerland 2 : 3
2018	Switzerland	3rd place	Poland 3 : 1
2020	Sweden	3rd place	Switzerland 6 : 2
2022	Poland	2nd place	Sweden 4 : 5 PS
2024	Finland	3rd place	Switzerland 5 : 1
2026	Italy	3rd place	Switzerland 6 : 5 PS
