= Anne Averio =

Finnish footballer (born 1964)

Personal information
- Date of birth: 7 October 1964 (age 62)
- Position: Forward

International career
Years	Team	Apps	(Gls)
	Finland	6	(0)

Anne Averio (born 7 October 1964) is a Finnish former footballer who played for HJK and the Finnish women's national team.

Averio was the top scorer in the Kansallinen Liiga multiple times and was the first player to score 100 goals, she would score a total of 120 goals.

== International career ==
Averio represented Finland six times.

== Floorball ==
Averio also played floorball for Finland.

== Honours ==
HJK

- 6 Finnish Leagues
- 4 Finnish Cups

Finland women's national floorball team

- 1999 Women's World Floorball Championships
