= 1999 Women's World Floorball Championships =

Floorball competition

Tournament details
- Host country: Sweden
- Dates: 9–15 May 1999
- Teams: 12

Final positions
- Champions: Finland (1st title)
- Runners-up: Switzerland
- Third place: Sweden

Tournament statistics
- Matches played: 24
- Goals scored: 204 (8.5 per match)
- Attendance: 7,210 (300 per match)
- Scoring leader(s): Linda Kristiansen (NOR)

Awards
- MVP: Anna-Maija Keränen (FIN)
- All statistics correct as of 2014-06-25.

The 1999 Women's World Floorball Championships was the second world championship in women's floorball. The games were played in Borlänge, Sweden 9–15 May 1999. Finland won the tournament defeating Switzerland, 5–1, in the final-game and it was their first title. This also was the first time that the world championships were divided into two separate divisions, although all games were played at the same dates in Borlänge. Sweden won the bronze medals defeating Norway, 5–1, in the bronze medal game.

Australia, Denmark and Singapore made their first appearances in the women's floorball world championships.

== Division A ==
=== Results ===
Originally there were planned to be two groups consisting of four teams each, but because of a withdrawal from Russia group A dropped to three teams. The two best placed teams in each group advance to play semifinals while the third best teams went to play the game for 5th place. Because of Russia's withdrawal, they were automatically ranked last place and were relegated to the B-division for the next championship.

==== Group A ====
Team	Pld	W	D	L	GF	GA	GD	Pts
Sweden	2	2	0	0	14	2	+12	4
Switzerland	2	1	0	1	7	5	+2	2
Germany	2	0	0	2	2	16	−14	0

10 May 1999
16:30

Switzerland

6–1
(4–0, 2–1, 0–0)

Germany

Borlänge

11 May 1999
17:00

Sweden

4–1
(0–0, 1–1, 3–0)

Switzerland

Borlänge

12 May 1999
19:30

Germany

1–10
(0–4, 0–2, 1–4)

Sweden

Borlänge

==== Group B ====
Team	Pld	W	D	L	GF	GA	GD	Pts
Norway	3	3	0	0	23	4	+19	6
Finland	3	2	0	1	30	9	+21	4
Czech Republic	3	1	0	2	8	19	−11	2
Latvia	3	0	0	3	6	35	−29	0

10 May 1999
17:00

Finland

9–2
(3–0, 3–1, 3–1)

Czech Republic

Borlänge

10 May 1999
19:00

Norway

11–1
(4–0, 5–1, 2–0)

Latvia

Borlänge

11 May 1999
16:30

Czech Republic

5–3
(1–1, 4–0, 0–2)

Latvia

Borlänge

11 May 1999
19:30

Finland

2–5
(0–1, 0–1, 2–3)

Norway

Borlänge

12 May 1999
16:30

Norway

7–1
(1–1, 3–0, 3–0)

Czech Republic

Borlänge

12 May 1999
17:00

Latvia

2–19
(1–1, 1–7, 0–11)

Finland

Borlänge

==== Final stage ====
Semifinals
A1	Sweden	2(1)
B2	Finland	2(2)
B1	Norway	0
A2	Switzerland	4

Finals
B2	Finland	3
A2	Switzerland	1
Third place
A1	Sweden	5
B1	Norway	1

14 May 1999
14:00

Germany

4–8
(2–1, 0–4, 2–3)

Czech Republic

Borlänge

14 May 1999
17:00

Sweden

2–2 (a.e.t)
(0–1, 2–0, 0–1, 0–0)
Pen: 1–2

Finland

Borlänge

14 May 1999
20:00

Norway

0–4
(0–0, 0–0, 0–4)

Switzerland

Borlänge

15 May 1999
12:00

Sweden

5–1
(0–1, 3–0, 2–0)

Norway

Borlänge

15 May 1999
15:00

Finland

3–1
(0–1, 2–0, 1–0)

Switzerland

Borlänge

=== Statistics ===
==== Top scorers ====
	Player	G	A	P
1	Linda Kristiansen (NOR)	5	9	14
2	Birgitte Lersbryggen (NOR)	8	3	11
3	Jonna Kettunen (FIN)	7	1	8
4	Lise Johansen (NOR)	4	2	6
5	Satu Puustinen (FIN)	3	3	6
6	Marilla Puustinen (FIN)	2	4	6
7	Merja Pitkänen (FIN)	1	5	6
8	Camilla Granelid (SWE)	3	2	5
9	Ingrid Gigstad (NOR); Anne Averio (FIN)	3	1	4

==== All-star team ====
The inclusion of Laura Tomatis and Regula Kindhauser made them the first non-Nordic players to be included in the world championship history.

Goalkeeper: Laura Tomatis (SUI)
Defender: Lena Birath (SWE)
Defender: Regula Kindhauser (SUI)
Centre: Anna-Maija Keränen (FIN)
Forward: Birgitte Lersbryggen (NOR)
Forward: Susanna Tuominen (FIN)

MVP: Anna-Maija Keränen (FIN)

== Division B ==
=== Results ===
Team	Pld	W	D	L	GF	GA	GD	Pts
Austria	4	3	1	0	20	15	+5	7
Australia	4	2	1	1	15	14	+1	5
Denmark	4	1	1	2	17	14	+3	3
Japan	4	0	3	1	15	16	−1	3
Singapore	4	1	0	3	12	20	−8	2

9 May 1999
17:00

Australia

5–4
(1–2, 1–2, 3–0)

Singapore

Borlänge

9 May 1999
16:30

Japan

5–5
(2–1, 1–2, 2–2)

Austria

Borlänge

10 May 1999
14:30

Austria

6–5
(3–0, 1–1, 2–4)

Australia

Borlänge

10 May 1999
14:00

Singapore

2–7
(1–2, 1–1, 0–4)

Denmark

Borlänge

11 May 1999
14:00

Australia

2–2
(0–1, 1–0, 1–1)

Japan

Borlänge

11 May 1999
14:30

Denmark

2–3
(1–2, 0–0, 1–1)

Austria

Borlänge

12 May 1999
14:30

Japan

6–6
(0–2, 5–2, 1–2)

Denmark

Borlänge

12 May 1999
14:00

Austria

6–3
(2–0, 3–1, 1–2)

Singapore

Borlänge

13 May 1999
11:00

Singapore

3–2
(2–0, 0–2, 1–0)

Japan

Borlänge

13 May 1999
11:30

Australia

3–2
(0–1, 2–1, 1–0)

Denmark

Borlänge

=== Statistics ===
==== Top scorers ====
	Player	G	A	P
1	Jill Quek (SIN)	7	4	11
2	Sachi Yokoe (JPN)	6	3	9
3	Jutta Haberrmann (AUT)	5	4	9
4	Gabriele Leitner (AUT)	6	1	7
5	Louise Strøbech (DEN)	5	2	7
6	Miho Koike (JPN); Chikae Ogawa (JPN)	4	3	7
8	Elizabeth Privschek (AUT)	2	5	7
9	Gerlinde Weishaupt (AUT)	5	1	6
10	Sam Gill (AUS)	2	3	5

== Final rankings ==
Division A

1st place, gold medalist(s)	Finland
2nd place, silver medalist(s)	Switzerland
3rd place, bronze medalist(s)	Sweden
4	Norway
5	Czech Republic
6	Germany
7	Latvia

*Because of their withdrawal, Russia were relegated to division B for 2001.

Division B

1	Austria
2	Australia
3	Denmark
4	Japan
5	Singapore

*Austria is promoted to division A for 2001.

== See also ==
- IFF Tournament Site
