= Georgia women's national under-19 floorball team =

Georgia women's national under-19 floorball team is the national floorball team of Georgia. As of November 2024, the team was 27th in the IFF World Ranking.
