= Russia women's national under-19 floorball team =

Youth floorball team representing Russia

Russia women's national under-19 floorball team is the national floorball team of Russia. As of November 2024, the team was 20th in the IFF World Ranking.
