= Finland women's national under-19 floorball team =

Medal record

U-19 World Championships
| Gold medal – first place | 2012 Slovakia | |
| Gold medal – first place | 2020 Sweden | |
| Gold medal – first place | 2026 Italy | |
| Silver medal – second place | 2004 Finland | |
| Silver medal – second place | 2006 Germany | |
| Silver medal – second place | 2010 Czech Republic | |
| Silver medal – second place | 2014 Poland | |
| Silver medal – second place | 2016 Canada | |
| Silver medal – second place | 2018 Switzerland | |
| Silver medal – second place | 2024 Finland | |
| Bronze medal – third place | 2008 Poland | |
| Bronze medal – third place | 2022 Poland | |

Finland women's national under-19 floorball team is the national floorball team of Finland. As of November 2024, the team was second in the IFF World Ranking.
