= Slovakia women's national under-19 floorball team =

- Founded: 2006
- Coach: (Czech Republic) Jiří Typl
- First game: Slovakia 1–17 Finland (29 April 2006)
- Largest win: Slovakia 34–1 Georgia (9 May 2008)
- Largest defeat: Slovakia 0–21 Finland (8 November 2006)

Slovakia women's national under-19 floorball team is the national floorball team of Slovakia. As of November 2024, the team was fifth in the IFF World Ranking.
