= Sweden women's national under-19 floorball team =

National sports team

Medal record

U-19 World Championships
Gold medal – first place	2004 Finland	
Gold medal – first place	2006 Germany	
Gold medal – first place	2010 Czech Republic	
Gold medal – first place	2014 Poland	
Gold medal – first place	2016 Canada	
Gold medal – first place	2018 Switzerland	
Gold medal – first place	2022 Poland	
Gold medal – first place	2024 Finland	
Silver medal – second place	2008 Poland	
Silver medal – second place	2020 Sweden	
Silver medal – second place	2026 Italy	
Bronze medal – third place	2012 Slovakia	

Sweden women's national under-19 floorball team is the national floorball team of Sweden. As of November 2024, the team was the first in the IFF World Ranking.
