= Denmark women's national under-19 floorball team =

Denmark women's national under-19 floorball team is the national floorball team of Denmark. As of November 2024, the team was seventh in the IFF World Ranking.
