= Hungary women's national under-19 floorball team =

Youth floorball team representing Hungary

Hungary women's national under-19 floorball team is the national floorball team of Hungary. As of November 2024, the team was fourteenth in the IFF World Ranking.
