= Switzerland women's national under-19 floorball team =

Medal record

U-19 World Championships
Silver medal – second place	2012 Slovakia	
Bronze medal – third place	2004 Finland	
Bronze medal – third place	2006 Germany	
Bronze medal – third place	2016 Canada	

Switzerland women's national under-19 floorball team is the national floorball team of Switzerland. As of November 2024, the team was fourth in the IFF World Ranking.
