= Germany women's national under-19 floorball team =

Germany women's national under-19 floorball team is the national floorball team of Germany. As of November 2024, the team was tenth in the IFF World Ranking.
