= Latvia women's national under-19 floorball team =

Latvia women's national under-19 floorball team is the national floorball team of Latvia. As of November 2024, the team was ninth in the IFF World Ranking.
