= Poland women's national under-19 floorball team =

Poland women's national under-19 floorball team is the national floorball team of Poland. As of November 2024, the team was sixth in the IFF World Ranking.
