= Québec men's provincial floorball team =

Team Québec floorball

Québec Men's Floorball Team
- Flag of Québec
- Nickname(s): Team Québec
- Captain: (Sweden) Eero Piilokivi

The Québec men's provincial floorball team is the men's provincial floorball team of Québec, and a member of Floorball Canada. Québec's men's team is currently ranked 2nd in Canada at floorball, based on their performance at the 2010 Canadian Floorball Championships.

Québec maintains a strong rivalry in floorball with Ontario. The team is organized by Floorball Québec and is sponsored by Scanadian Floorball.

Québec won the inaugural Canadian Floorball Championships in 2007.

== Team roster ==
Goalkeepers
Nationality	Number	Player name	Club
(Quebec)	96	Martin Bélanger	Fight Club Montréal
(Canada)	31	Joe Cadigal	Montréal United

Defensemen
Nationality	Number	Player name	Club
(Sweden)	4	Eero Piilokivi – C	Montréal United
(Finland)	8	Pasi Nurminen	Montréal United
(Quebec)	5	Simon Leblanc – A	Fight Club Montréal
(Quebec)	95	Guillaume Gosselin	Montréal Young Guns IBK
(Quebec)	21	Marc-Andre Gosselin	Montréal United
(Switzerland)	16	Fabien Jeanneret	Montréal United

Forwards
Nationality	Number	Player name	Club
(Quebec)	67	Stéphane Laporte – A	Montréal United
(Quebec)	12	Francois Bérube	Montréal El Feugo
(Quebec)	10	Alexandre Dupont	Montréal Young Guns IBK
(Canada)	15	Charles Simpkins	Montréal United
(Quebec)	11	Guillaume Lamy	Montréal El Fuego
(Quebec)	91	Patrice Paré	Fight Club Montréal
(Quebec)	19	Matthew Férron	Fight Club Montréal
(Quebec)	66	JS Plante	Fight Club Montréal

=== Canadian Nationals ===
Year	GP	W	D	L	GF	GA	+/-
(Quebec) 2007	0	0	0	0	0	0	0
(Alberta) 2008	0	0	0	0	0	0	0
(British Columbia) 2009	0	0	0	0	0	0	0
(Ontario) 2010	0	0	0	0	0	0	0
(British Columbia) 2011	0	0	0	0	0	0	0
Totals	0	0	0	0	0	0	0
