= Ontario men's provincial floorball team =

Ontario Men's Floorball Team
- Flag of Ontario
- Nickname(s): Team Ontario
- Captain: (Canada) Randy Sa'd

The Ontario men's provincial floorball team is the men's provincial floorball team of Ontario, and a member of Floorball Canada. Ontario's men's team is currently ranked 1st in Canada at floorball, based on their performance at the 2010 Canadian Floorball Championships.

Ontario maintains a strong rivalry in floorball with Quebec. The team is organized by Ontario Floorball.

Ontario placed second the inaugural Canadian Floorball Championships in 2007.

== Canadian Nationals ==
Year	GP	W	D	L	GF	GA	+/-
(Quebec) 2007	0	0	0	0	0	0	0
(Alberta) 2008	0	0	0	0	0	0	0
(British Columbia) 2009	0	0	0	0	0	0	0
(Ontario) 2010	0	0	0	0	0	0	0
(British Columbia) 2011	0	0	0	0	0	0	0
Totals	0	0	0	0	0	0	0
