= 2009 Canadian Floorball Championships =

Championnats canadiens de floorball

Tournament details
- City: Richmond, British Columbia
- Venue: 1 (in 1 host city)
- Dates: 17–19 April 2009
- Teams: 4

Tournament statistics
- Matches played: 20
- Goals scored: 0 (0 per match)
- All statistics correct as of 01:10, 22 December 2008 (UTC).

The 2009 Canadian Floorball Championships were the third national championships in Canadian floorball. The tournament took place 16–18 April 2009 in Richmond, British Columbia. The event was organized by the British Columbia Floorball Federation (BCFF), and is sanctioned by Floorball Canada.

All matches took place in the Richmond Olympic Oval, an official venue for the 2010 Winter Olympics.

In conjunction with the event, 3 friendly matches between the men's national floorball teams of India and Canada were played. In addition to that, there was an International Floorball Federation development seminar as well.

== Men's results ==
=== Preliminary round ===
| Pos | Team | Pld | W | D | L | GF | GA | GD | Pts |
|---|---|---|---|---|---|---|---|---|---|
| 1 | Alberta | 0 | 0 | 0 | 0 | 0 | 0 | 0 | 0 |
| 2 | British Columbia | 0 | 0 | 0 | 0 | 0 | 0 | 0 | 0 |
| 3 | Ontario | 0 | 0 | 0 | 0 | 0 | 0 | 0 | 0 |
| 4 | (Quebec) Québec | 0 | 0 | 0 | 0 | 0 | 0 | 0 | 0 |

==== 17 April 2009 ====
17 April 2009
08.00

| Alberta | 0:0 | British Columbia |

Richmond, British Columbia
Richmond Olympic Oval

17 April 2009
09.15

| Ontario | 0:0 | (Quebec) Québec |

Richmond, British Columbia
Richmond Olympic Oval

17 April 2009
12.30

| (Quebec) Québec | 0:0 | British Columbia |

Richmond, British Columbia
Richmond Olympic Oval

17 April 2009
13.45

| Ontario | 0:0 | Alberta |

Richmond, British Columbia
Richmond Olympic Oval

Note: All times are PST

==== 18 April 2009 ====
18 April 2009
08.00

| Alberta | 0:0 | (Quebec) Québec |

Richmond, British Columbia
Richmond Olympic Oval

18 April 2009
09.15

| British Columbia | 0:0 | Ontario |

Richmond, British Columbia
Richmond Olympic Oval

Note: All times are PST

=== Playoffs ===
Semifinals
1 | TBD | 0
4 | TBD | 0
2 | TBD | 0
3 | TBD | 0

Finals
TBD | 0
TBD | 0

==== Semi-finals ====
18 April 2009
12.30

| 1st Place | 0:0 | 4th Place |

Richmond, British Columbia
Richmond Olympic Oval

18 April 2009
14.00

| 2nd Place | 0:0 | 3rd Place |

Richmond, British Columbia
Richmond Olympic Oval

Note: All times are PST

==== Bronze-medal match ====
19 April 2009
09.15

| Loser (semi-final 1) | 0:0 | Loser (semi-final 2) |

Richmond, British Columbia
Richmond Olympic Oval

Note: All times are PST

==== Canadian Championship Match ====
19 April 2009
10.45

| Winner (semi-final 1) | 0:0 | Winner (semi-final 2) |

Richmond, British Columbia
Richmond Olympic Oval

Note: All times are PST

== Women's results ==
=== Preliminary round ===
| Pos | Team | Pld | W | D | L | GF | GA | GD | Pts |
|---|---|---|---|---|---|---|---|---|---|
| 1 | British Columbia | 0 | 0 | 0 | 0 | 0 | 0 | 0 | 0 |
| 2 | Manitoba | 0 | 0 | 0 | 0 | 0 | 0 | 0 | 0 |
| 3 | Ontario | 0 | 0 | 0 | 0 | 0 | 0 | 0 | 0 |
| 4 | (Quebec) Québec | 0 | 0 | 0 | 0 | 0 | 0 | 0 | 0 |

==== 17 April 2009 ====
17 April 2009
10.30

| Manitoba | 0:0 | British Columbia |

Richmond, British Columbia
Richmond Olympic Oval

17 April 2009
11.30

| Ontario | 0:0 | (Quebec) Québec |

Richmond, British Columbia
Richmond Olympic Oval

17 April 2009
15.00

| (Quebec) Québec | 0:0 | British Columbia |

Richmond, British Columbia
Richmond Olympic Oval

17 April 2009
16.00

| Ontario | 0:0 | Manitoba |

Richmond, British Columbia
Richmond Olympic Oval

Note: All times are PST

==== 18 April 2009 ====
18 April 2009
10.30

| Manitoba | 0:0 | (Quebec) Québec |

Richmond, British Columbia
Richmond Olympic Oval

18 April 2009
11.30

| British Columbia | 0:0 | Ontario |

Richmond, British Columbia
Richmond Olympic Oval

Note: All times are PST

=== Playoffs ===
Semifinals
1 | TBD | 0
4 | TBD | 0
2 | TBD | 0
3 | TBD | 0

Finals
TBD | 0
TBD | 0

==== Semi-finals ====
18 April 2009
15.30

| 1st Place | 0:0 | 4th Place |

Richmond, British Columbia
Richmond Olympic Oval

18 April 2009
16.45

| 2nd Place | 0:0 | 3rd Place |

Richmond, British Columbia
Richmond Olympic Oval

Note: All times are PST

==== Bronze-medal match ====
19 April 2009
08.00

| Loser (semi-final 1) | 0:0 | Loser (semi-final 2) |

Richmond, British Columbia
Richmond Olympic Oval

Note: All times are PST

==== Canadian Championship Match ====
19 April 2009
12.15

| Winner (semi-final 1) | 0:0 | Winner (semi-final 2) |

Richmond, British Columbia
Richmond Olympic Oval

Note: All times are PST

== Friendly Internationals ==
=== 17 April 2009 ===
17 April 2009
17.00

| Canada | 0:0 | India |

Richmond, British Columbia
Richmond Olympic Oval

Note: All times are PST

=== 18 April 2009 ===
18 April 2009
19.00

| Canada | 0:0 | India |

Richmond, British Columbia
Richmond Olympic Oval

Note: All times are PST

=== 19 April 2009 ===
19 April 2009
16.00

| Canada | 0:0 | India |

Richmond, British Columbia
Richmond Olympic Oval

Note: All times are PST

== See also ==
- 2007 Canadian Floorball Championships

| Preceded by 2008 Canadian Championships; Calgary, AB | Canadian Floorball Championships; Richmond, B.C. 2009 | Succeeded by 2010 Canadian Championships; TBA, Ontario |
