= Water Sky Garden =

Sculpture in Vancouver

Coordinates: 49°10′29″N 123°9′5″W

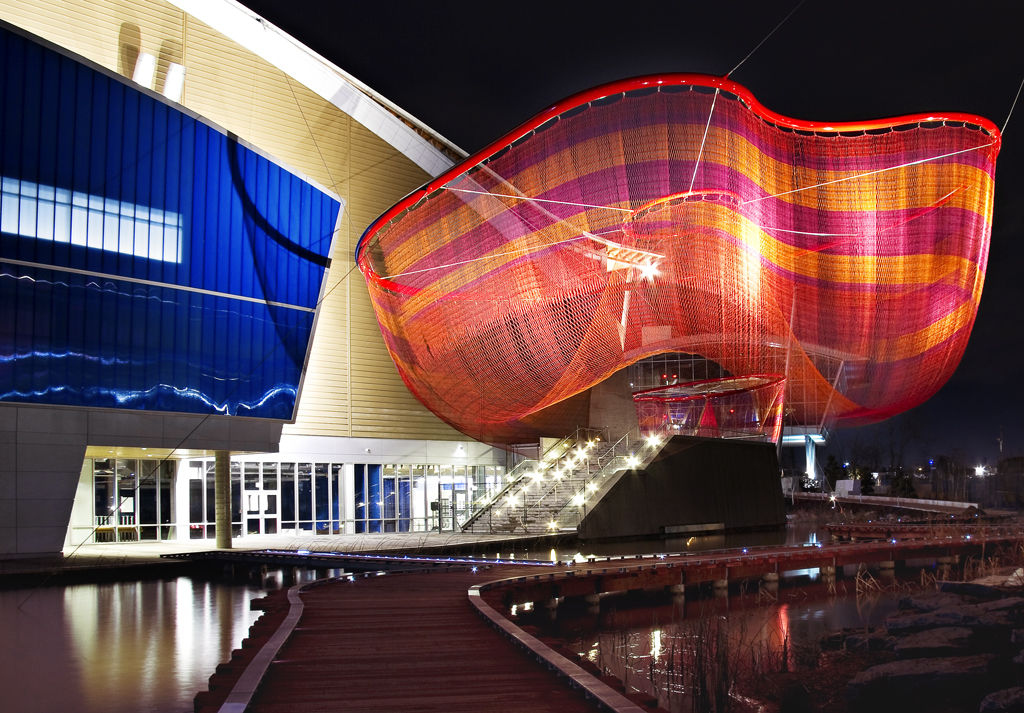
- Artist: Janet Echelman
- Year: 2009–2010
- Type: Tenara brand PTFE fiber
- Location: Richmond Olympic Oval, Richmond, British Columbia, Canada

Water Sky Garden is a sculptural environment designed by artist Janet Echelman. The garden is located outside the Richmond Olympic Oval, an official venue for the 2010 Vancouver Olympic Games. The installation consists of a wetland treatment pond, 300 ft. boardwalk, two 52 ft. pedestrian bridges, two net sculptures, and a fountain.

== Design ==
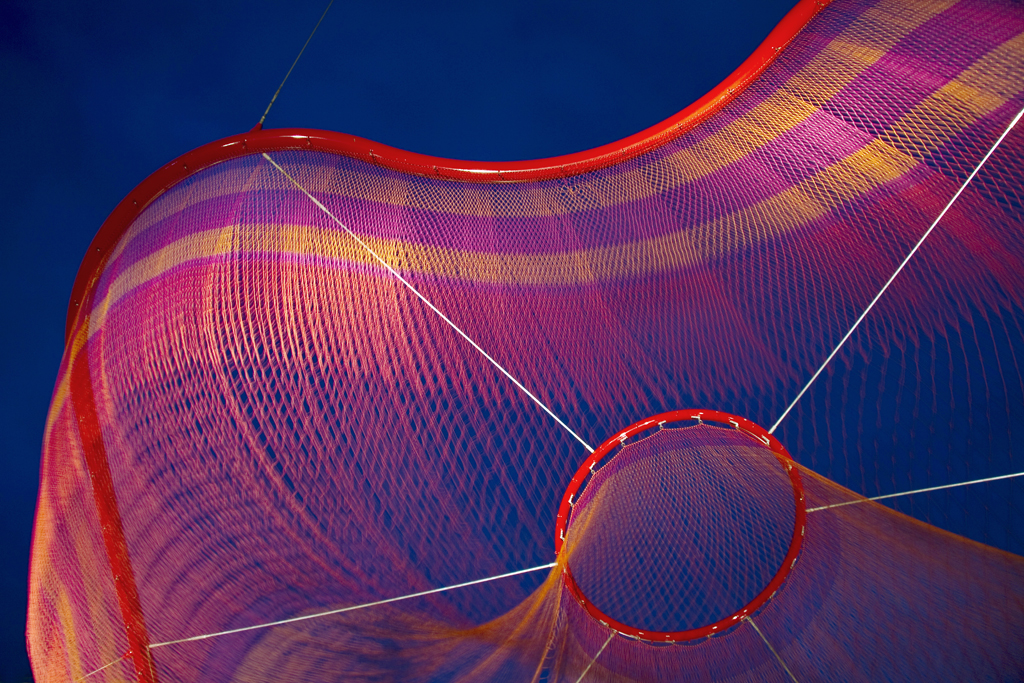
Water Sky Garden, Vancouver

The boardwalk and "sky lanterns" were inspired by Richmond's cultural communities. Richmond's immigrant population is the highest of any city in Canada. More than half of these immigrants are of Asian descent. The boardwalk was designed to resemble the choreography of the Dragon Dance, a performance frequently used in Chinese festivals. The Nitobe Memorial Garden and Dr. Sun Yat-Sen Chinese Garden, both in Vancouver, were important inspirations for paths, ponds and framing of the garden's landscape. The boardwalk was designed to encourage people to linger and view the

garden.

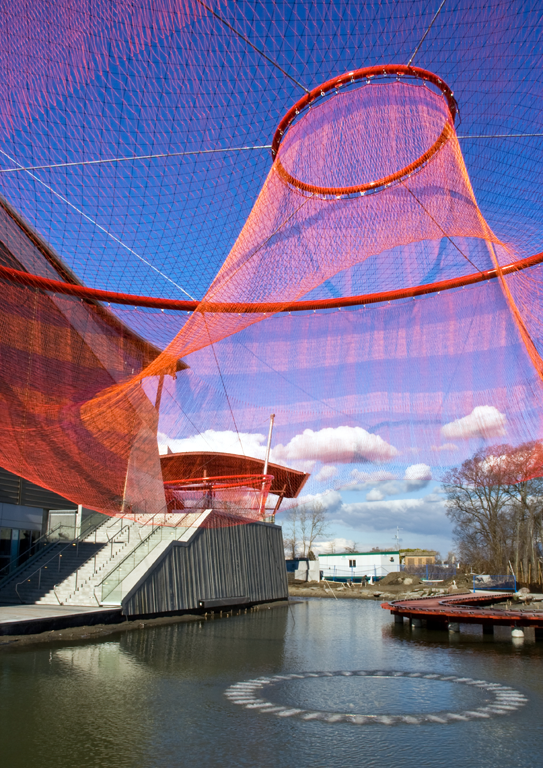
Water Sky Garden from underneath

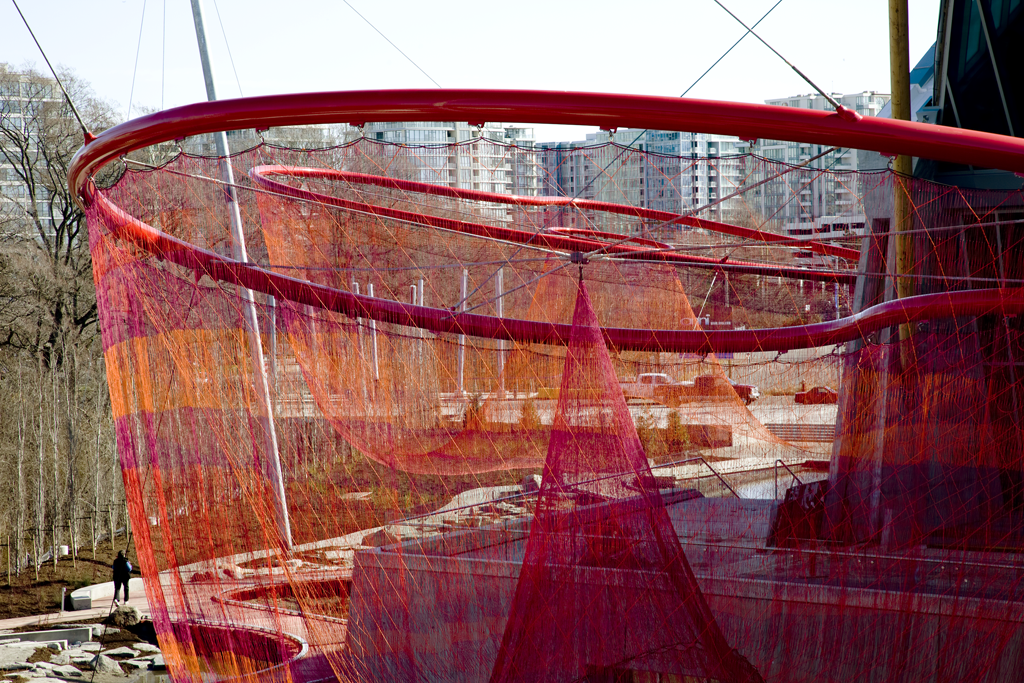
Top Detail of Water Sky Garden

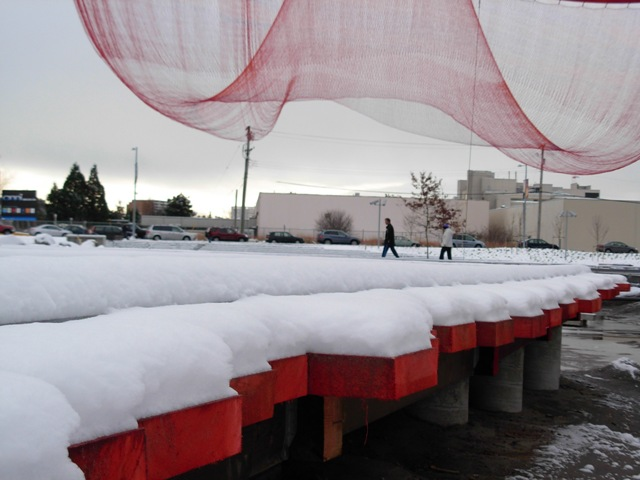
Snowy day at Water Sky Garden

The pond collects rainwater from the Oval's roof and surrounding landscape. It is then purified and re-circulated to be used to irrigate the plants in the surrounding space, provide clean water for the Oval, and empty into the adjacent Fraser River. Aeration for the pond is provided by a fountain on the South side of the garden.

The "sky lanterns" are made of ultraviolet-resistant PTFE fiber nets, supported by painted galvanized steel rings. At night, the lanterns are lit with submerged lights, and the boardwalk is lit with LED spotlights. The eastern lantern is 75 ft. at its largest diameter, and the netting is 25 ft. deep. The northern lantern is 52 ft. at its largest diameter. Its net is 25 ft. deep with a 14 ft. tail that descends to the pond below. The garden was designed so that participants can both look at and look through the netted sculptures without obstructing the view of the Oval building or the surrounding garden area.

The initial design process began with the creation of a three-dimensional computer model created using custom software. Those forms were then translated into CAD software in order to define the geometry and surfaces of the sculpture. These digital structures were then exported to a gravity and wind simulator in order to determine the necessary twine tenacity to withstand strong winds. From this information, construction drawings are created which include specific looming patterns, colour information, and lengths of meshes.
