= Vancouver Dragons =

- Leagues: ABA (2017); MLBA (2018); PBA (2021–present)
- Founded: 2017
- History: Vancouver Dragons; 2017–present
- Arena: O'Connell Sports Center
- Location: Vancouver, Washington
- Team colors: Red, black, and white
- Ownership: Marcus "Doc" Stancil (2019–present)
- Championships: 1 (2018 MLBA)
- Website: Vancouver Dragons

The Vancouver Dragons are a professional basketball team, playing in the PRO Basketball Association (PBA) since 2021.

== History ==
In 2001, David Tuckman of Tuckon's Sports proposed a $150 million sports arena and performing arts center project to the city council of Bellevue, Washington, an affluent Seattle suburb, to be built on three acres of city-owned land downtown. Tuckman needed sports tenants to sign long-term leases in order to obtain financing for his project, so he paid $125,000 in cash in 2003 to purchase a CBA expansion franchise for Bellevue to become an anchor tenant. The league gave Tuckman permission to play at nearby Bellevue Community College (BCC) for three years while Bellevue Civic Center Arena was being built at NE 8th and 112th NE across the street from the Meydenbauer Convention Center. When it was determined that BCC would not be a suitable venue for professional basketball, Tuckman moved the team to Vancouver and changed the name to the Dragons.

Tuckman negotiated a three-year lease with the Pacific National Exhibition in Vancouver, British Columbia, to play 24 home games each year in the 4,500-seat Agrodome in 2006. That same year, Vancouver was awarded the 2010 Winter Olympics and the Dragons' lease was deferred until the conclusion of the games due to the high demand for indoor sports facilities leading up to the Olympics.

In a 2006 interview with the Vancouver Sun newspaper, Tuckman said that one of the hurdles to playing in Vancouver was that most international players had single-entrance visas, which meant that if they left the United States to play a game in Canada, they could not return to the U.S.

The Dragons were intended to play in the ABA with Tuckman's other teams. This would be the fourth time that Vancouver had a professional basketball team; Vancouver's other professional teams were the World Basketball League's Vancouver Nighthawks, the NBA's Vancouver Grizzlies and the International Basketball League's BC Titans.

The Vancouver Dragons team was sold to Marcus "Doc" Stancil in 2019, and with new ownership the team was relocated from Vancouver BC to Vancouver Washington and moved from the ABA to the PBA (Pro Basketball Association) for the 2021 season.

== Minor League Basketball Association ==
In November 2017, it was announced that the team would be one of the inaugural franchises in the Minor League Basketball Association (MLBA) and play their home games at the David E. Endarson Gymnasium at Trinity Western University in Langley, British Columbia, just east of the city of Vancouver, British Columbia, in the Fraser Valley part of the Metro Vancouver Regional District. They won the 2018 MLBA championship.

== ABA ==
The Vancouver Dragons joined the ABA in the 2018 - 2019 Season to be the only Canadian team in the league. They play in the ABA Far West Region. The team plays its Home Games at the Richmond Olympic Oval with 8,000 seats for basketball and is in Richmond, British Columbia, a suburb of Vancouver just south of the city near the Vancouver International Airport, In 2019 ownership was sold to Marcus "Doc" Stancil who relocated the team from Vancouver BC to Vancouver Washington and moved from the ABA to the PBA.

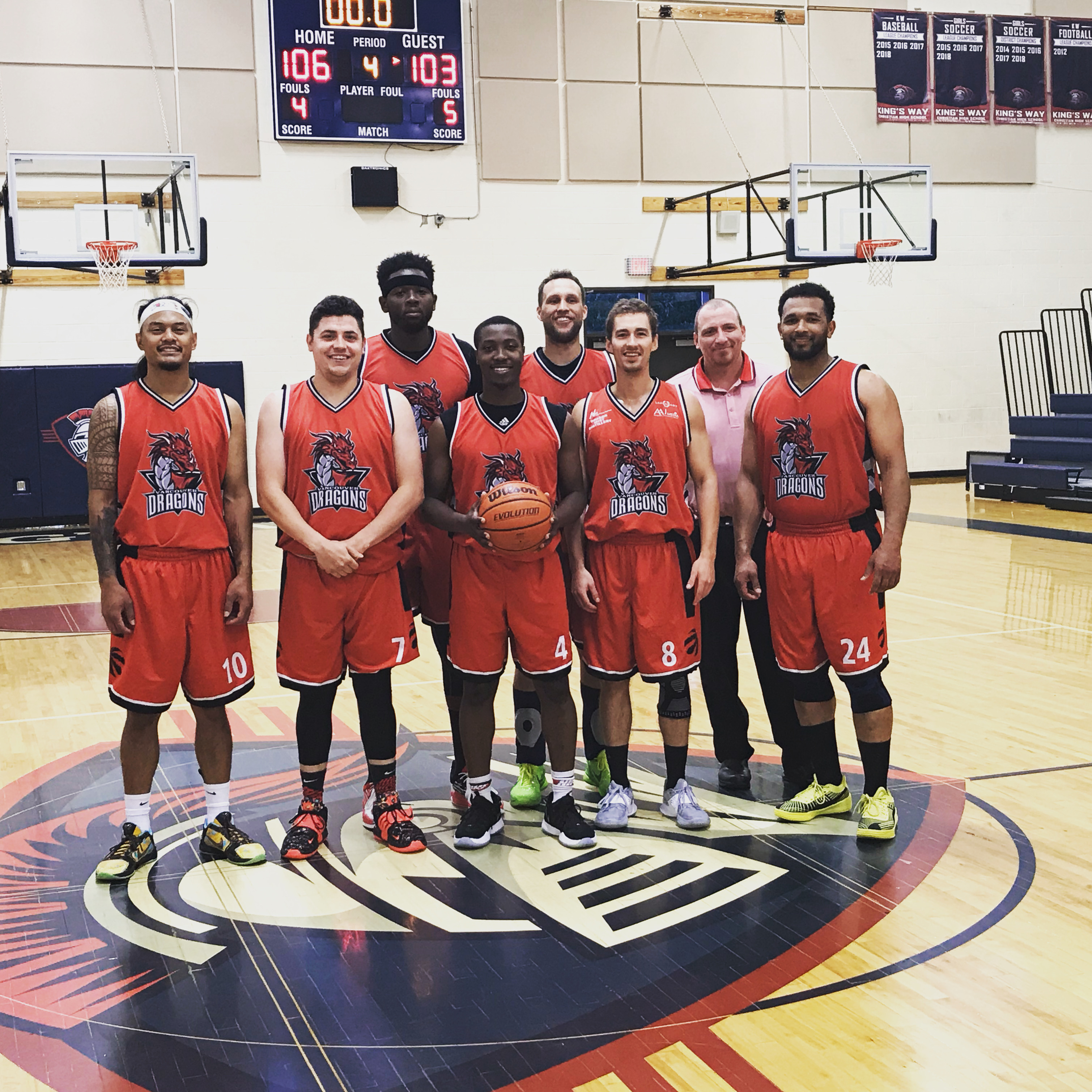
2020 Vancouver Roster

== PBA ==
The Dragons join the Pro Basketball Association for the augural season of the league in 2021 in the North West Division. They finished their first year with a record of 4-6.
