= Richmond Olympic Oval =

Sports arena in British Columbia, Canada

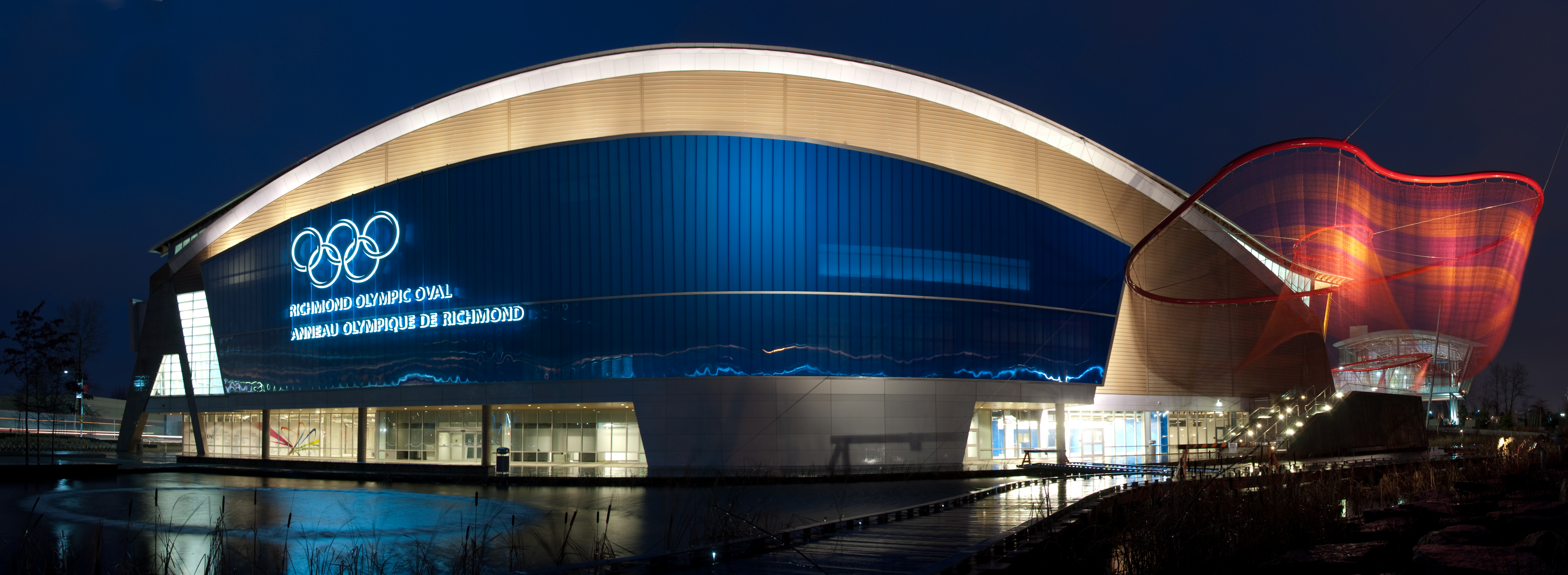
- The Olympic Oval at night
- Interactive map of Richmond Olympic Oval
- Full name: Richmond Olympic Oval
- Location: 6111 River Road, Richmond, British Columbia, Canada
- Coordinates: 49°10′29″N 123°9′5″W
- Owner: City of Richmond
- Operator: Richmond Olympic Oval Corporation
- Capacity: 8,000

Construction
- Groundbreaking: 17 November 2006
- Opened: 12 December 2008
- Cost: $178 million
- Architect: CannonDesign
- Project manager: Colliers Project Leaders
- Structural engineers: Fast + Epp, Glotman Simpson
- General contractor: Stuart Olson (Now Bird Construction)

Tenants
- 2009 World Single Distance Speed Skating Championships; 2010 Winter Olympics; Greater Vancouver Canadians (BCMML) (2012–); Vancouver Dragons (ABA) (2018–2019); Vancouver Knights (NAPB) (2018)

The Richmond Olympic Oval (French: Anneau olympique de Richmond) is an indoor multi-sports arena in the Canadian city of Richmond, British Columbia. The oval was built for the 2010 Winter Olympics and was originally configured with a speed skating rink. The venue has since been reconfigured and now serves as a community multi-sport park and includes two ice hockey rinks, two running tracks, a climbing wall, a rowing tank and a flexible area which can be used for, among other sports, basketball, volleyball, indoor soccer and table tennis.

The Olympic bid called for the oval to be located on the grounds of Simon Fraser University (SFU) in Burnaby, but Richmond was instead selected in 2004. Although twice the price of the SFU alternative, the location was selected because the city offered to cover all costs exceeding $60 million. Construction started in 2006, cost $178 million CAD and the venue opened on 12 December 2008. In addition to speed skating at the 2010 Winter Olympics, the venue has hosted the 2009 World Single Distance Speed Skating Championships. Designed by CannonDesign, the oval's elements are made to resemble the heron.

== Construction ==
Work on Vancouver's bid process started in 1998 by the Vancouver/Whistler 2010 Bid Society, replaced by the Vancouver 2010 Bid Corporation in 2002. SFU started planning their grounds as a potential speed skating oval in 2000, SFU pledged to finance $5 million of the venue, in addition to the land. The 2010 Games Operating Trust was established in November 2002 with a capital of $110 million, equally financed by the provincial and federal governments, to subsidize post-Olympic operation of selected venues. Forty percent of the payouts would be used to cover the operating costs of the speed skating oval.

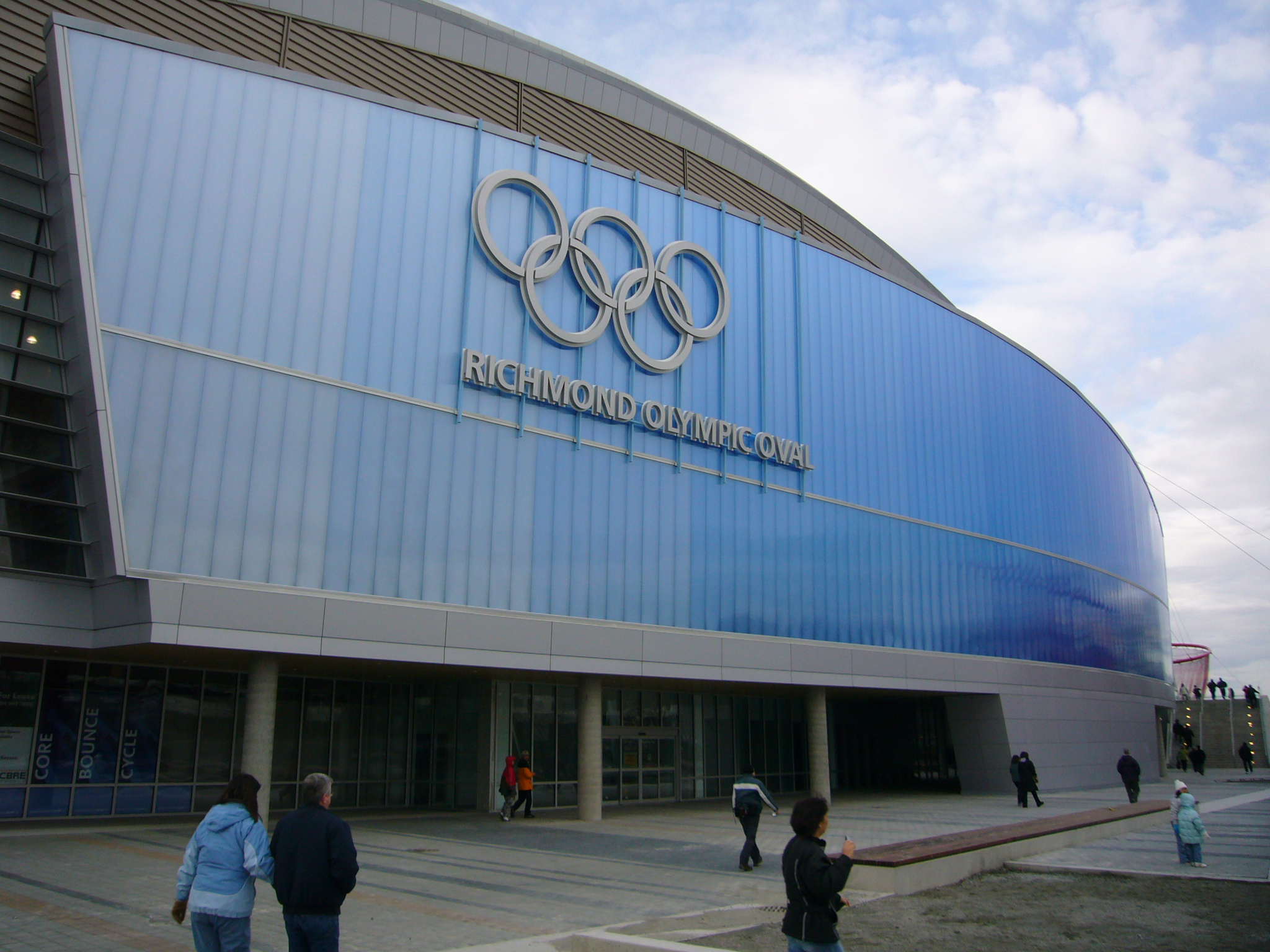
Front entrance

The bid book called for the speed skating oval to be located on the premises of Simon Fraser University atop Burnaby Mountain in Burnaby. This would result in both of Greater Vancouver's major universities receiving a new sports venue, as the Doug Mitchell Thunderbird Sports Centre ice hockey rink would be built at the University of British Columbia. The bid book cited a construction cost of $63.7 million, which would give a 20,000-square-meter (220,000 sq ft) arena and met all requirements for speed skating at the Olympics. The post-Olympic operating costs of the oval, along with the Whistler Sliding Centre and Whistler Olympic Park, were according to the bid book to be covered by $71 million endowment trust. The legacy plans for the venue were to convert it to a multi-sports park, with the speed skating track being removed.

Two months after being awarded the games on 2 July 2003, the responsibility for planning the Olympics were transferred to the Vancouver Organizing Committee for the 2010 Olympic and Paralympic Winter Games (VANOC). They started reviewing the plans for the various venues, and costs started to increase for the oval. At the same time the Richmond City Council started working on plans to instead locate the venue there. UBC also started working on a proposal for a speed skating oval in the University Endowment Lands, which could then be built in conjunction with the hockey arena. Chris Giacomantonio, president of the Simon Fraser Student Society, stated that he was opposed to the project, as the university's contribution would give little benefit for students. The anticipated cost overruns were caused both because of a general shortage in construction labor, and challenging geological conditions at the proposed site.

Two formal proposals were submitted: one from Richmond and a revised bid from SFU. The Richmond bid was for a significantly larger venue, at 33,000 square meters (360,000 sq ft). Unlike SFU, the city was willing to pay for most of the construction cost, including all cost overruns, limiting VANOC's costs to $60 million. The budget for the Richmond Olympic Oval was $155 million, while the cost of building a venue at SFU was $78.6 million. VANOC announced on 17 August 2004 that they had selected Richmond as the site of the Olympic oval. VANOC stated that in addition to a cost cap, the Richmond alternative featured better transport, as it would be located on the SkyTrain's Canada Line. Burnaby Mayor Derek Corrigan stated that the price increases were subject to cost escalation caused by increased general construction costs, rather than cost overrun.

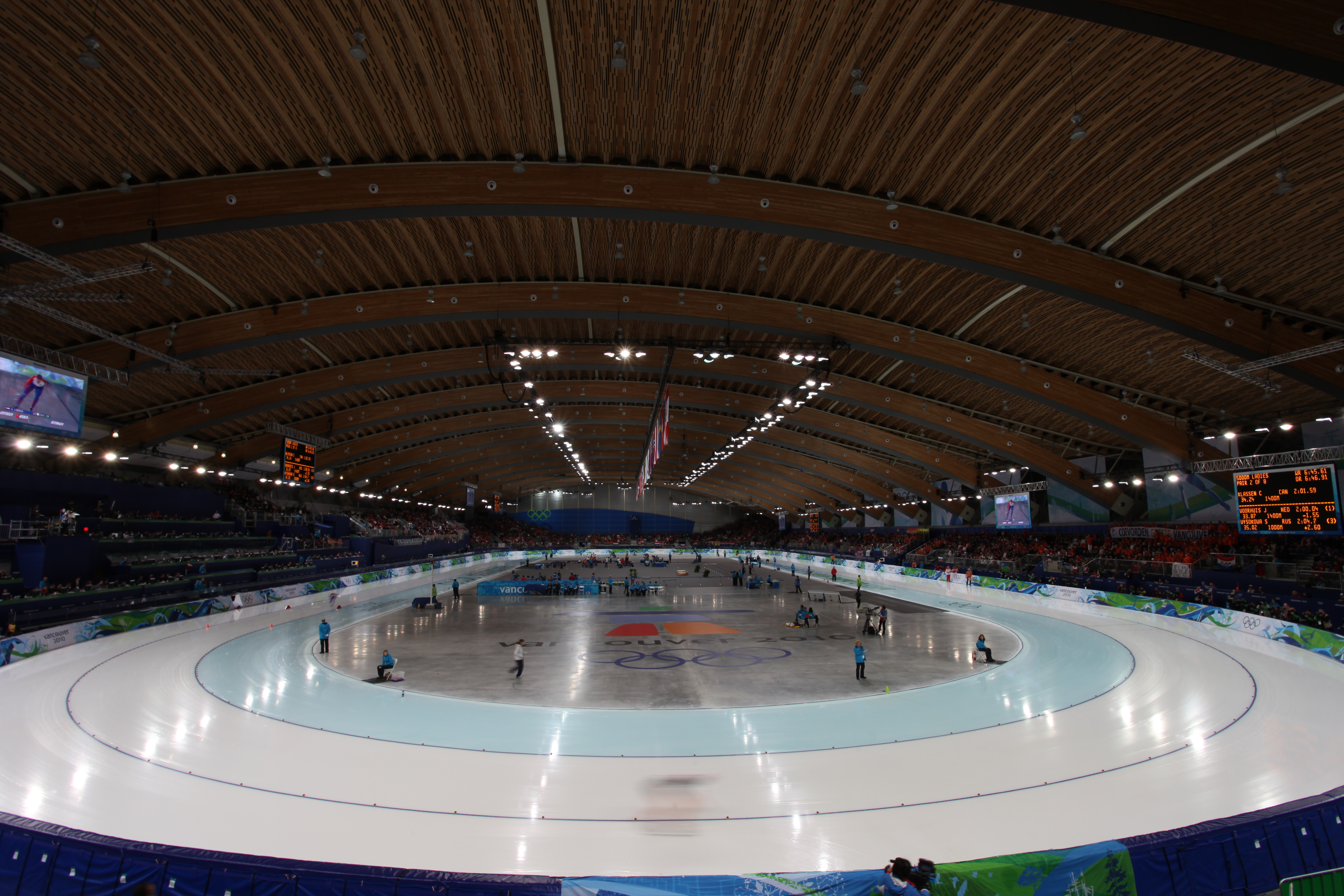
Interior of the Richmond Olympic Oval during the 2010 Vancouver Olympics

Planning of the venue was centered around its post-Olympic use, rather than its function during the games. It was incorporated into the River Green development project, which saw $2 billion spent on real estate development along the section of the Fraser River. Financing of the venue was split between Richmond City Council and VANOC, with the former guaranteeing for any cost overruns. The city allocated its funding for the venue from several sources: $50 million in revenue sharing with River Rock Casino Resort, $54 million from the nearby real estate development, and the remainder from sponsorships and fees on near-by projects.

The venue's main architect was Bob Johnston, of Canon Design, who had previously worked on the Olympic Oval in Calgary and the Utah Olympic Oval in Salt Lake City. A feng shui consultant was used during the design process as its implementation is important to the large Chinese Canadian population in Richmond. The initial design cost $206 million, but this was cut back by removing features. One that was kept was an underground parking lot under the venue, which increased construction cost by $23 million. The city split the construction work into 23 separate contracts. The city sent delegations to sixteen ovals around the world, costing $459,000. It was topped off on spending $120,000 to send nine officials, including the mayor and a councilor, to attend the 2006 Winter Olympics. Project management was contracted to MHPM Project Managers, construction manager was Dominion Fairmile Construction and structural engineers were Fast + Epp and Glotman Simpson, with the former responsible for the roof structure and façade and the latter for the base building. StructureCraft designed, manufactured and erected the 452 wood wave panels of the roof.

The 7 hectares (17 acres) plot of land next to the venue was placed for sale during the development. Initially asking for $40 million, the lot was sold for $141 million. Additional land was bought by developers, resulting in the oval being surrounded by luxury condos. The neighborhood was planned to be pedestrian-friendly, and there were no at-grade parking. The River Green project is part of Richmond's plan to become more urban and less suburban and build up community centers, backed with the arrival of the Canada Line.

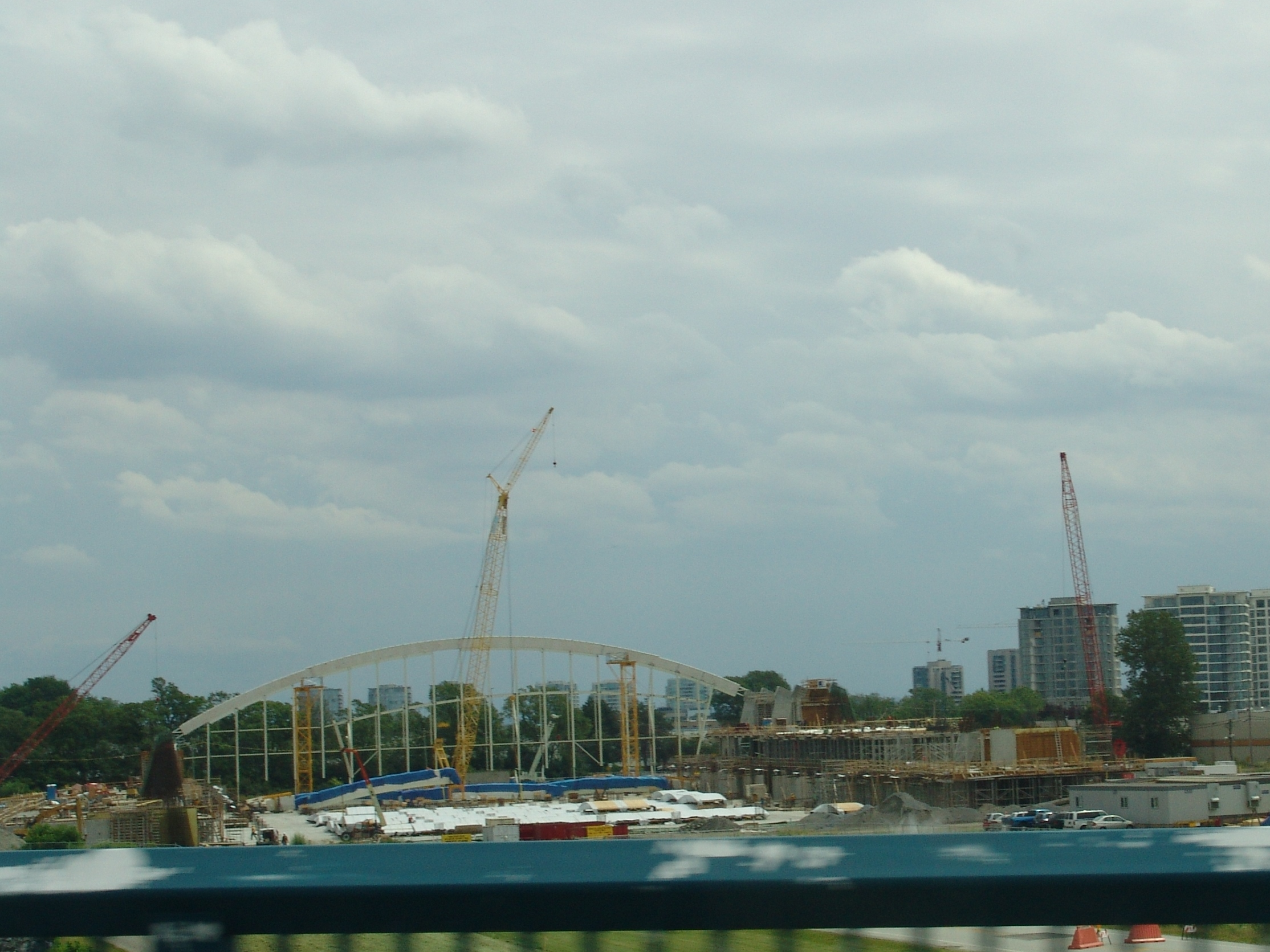
Construction on 28 June 2007

A 2005 geological report concluded that the venue would have geological challenges, similar to those which had been used as argument to move them from Burnaby Mountain. The venue is built in a river delta on top of up to 300 meters (980 ft) of silt, and the report warned that despite the design measures, significant seismic activity prior to the Olympics could mean that the venue bed would not be flat enough. The International Skating Union only allows a deviation of 3 millimeters (0.12 in) per 3 meters (9.8 ft) of track, and 20 millimeters (0.79 in) along the entire course. VANOC's official back-up plan was, in case of a major earthquake, to move speed skating events to Calgary. Construction began with the compressing of the ground, which included bolstering two thousand columns of rock down 26 meters (85 ft) and the piling of 100,000 cubic meters (3,500,000 cu ft) of sand on the site. A December 2005 report found that this was not sufficient, resulting in franki piles also being installed. To finance this, $1.9 million was cut by reducing the building's width by 4.5 meters (15 ft). To minimize the risk of flooding, the height of the dike between the venue and the river was raised from 3 to 6 meters (10 to 20 ft).

Construction required the pouring of 335,280 cubic meters (11,840,000 cu ft) of concrete, the use of 5,600 tonnes of steel and 305 board-kilometers (one million board-feet) of pine beetle wood. The roof was completed in January 2008, but in April fungi and algae were discovered in the lower insulation layer of the roof. To get at the area, seventy percent of the roof's membrane needed to be detached and replaced. The replacement cost $2 million, with the city claiming the amount compensated from the contractor.

When the venue opened on 12 December 2008, it was the last of the Olympic venues to be completed. The Richmond Olympic Oval Corporation was created as a municipal corporation in 2010, with the sole purpose of operating the venue.

Following the Olympics, the venue was transformed into a community multi-sports park, which opened in April 2010. Bleachers for 800 spectators were sold to be used for the Vancouver Island University gymnasium. Costing $300,000 new, they were sold for $4000.

== Facilities ==
The glazed façade and its timber roof canopies, 2026

A roof canopy seen from below

The facility is located on at 6111 River Road in Richmond, immediately south of Vancouver, on the south shore of the Fraser River. The building is 200 meters (660 ft) long and 100 meters (330 ft) wide; the roof covers an area of 2.6 hectares (6.4 acres), while the building is 33,600 square meters (362,000 sq ft). The main design inspiration is the heron, the official bird of Richmond. The roof is held up using fifteen glued laminated timber beams, and is designed to resemble the wings of the heron.

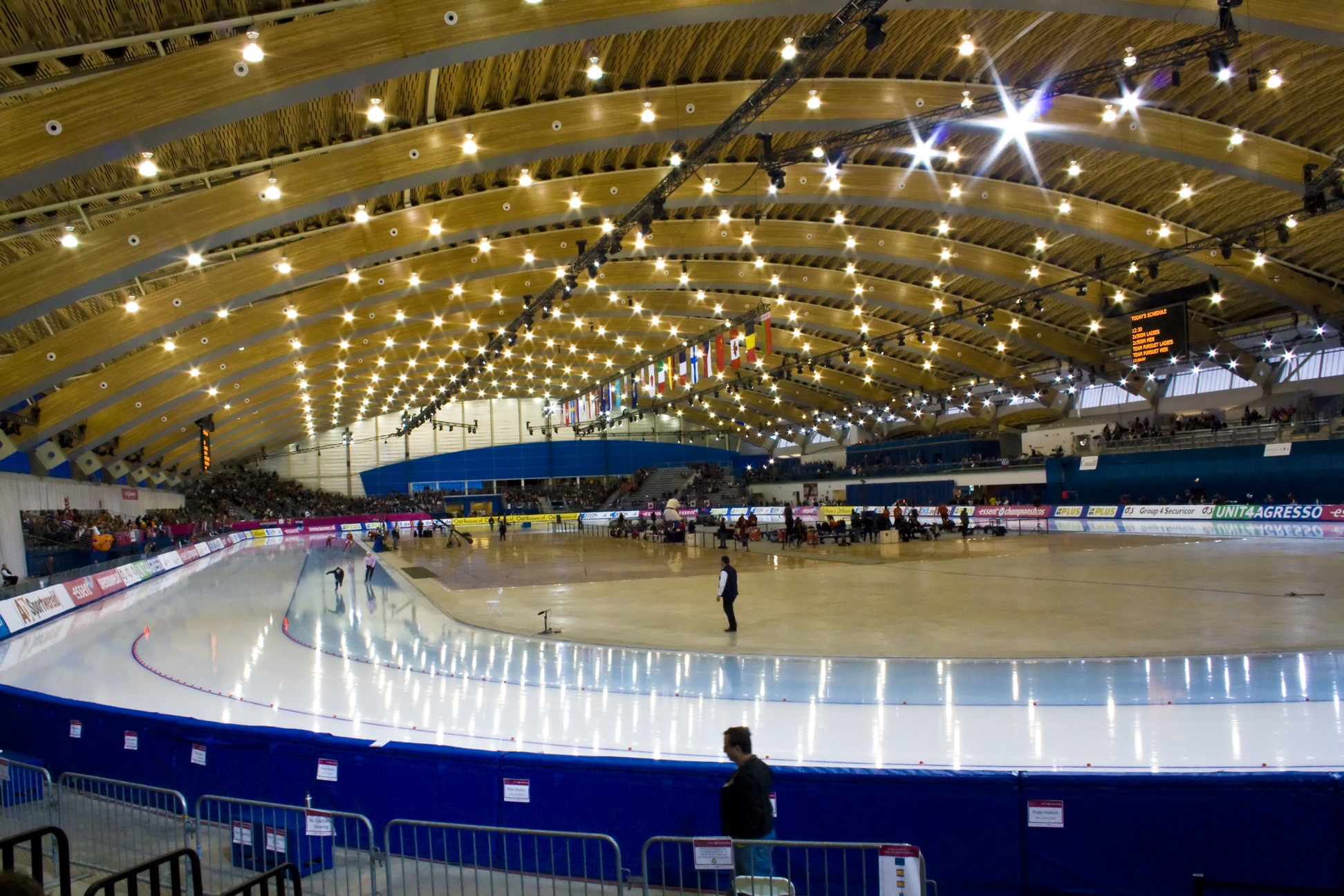
The oval during the 2009 World Single Distance Speed Skating Championships

The oval's roof uses pine beetle damaged wood, which was selected as a showpiece to aid the use of a material which has caused a negative economic impact in many British Columbia communities. The building received Leadership in Energy and Environmental Design (LEED) Silver certification. Environmental design includes the capture of rain water on the roof and the recycling of waste heat energy from the refrigeration system for the ice surfaces.

The Olympic configuration, which was in place from the opening until April 2010, consisted of a 400-meter (1,312 ft) speed skating rink. While configured for speed skating, the venue had a capacity for 8,000 spectators, of which 7,336 were bucket seats. In addition there were 200 broadcast commentator positions and 200 seated press positions. Four scoreboards and four videoboards were mounted in the arena and the Olympic doping laboratory was located at the oval.

After the games the venue was reconfigured. The upper level consists of a fitness center with views of the North Shore mountains and the river and houses more than 200 pieces of equipment. The main floor consists of three activity zones: the Ice Zone consists of two ice hockey rinks with international dimensions, the Court Zone consists of ten basketball courts and the Track Zone consists of a five-lane 200-meter (660 ft) oval running track and a five-lane 110-meter (360 ft) sprint track. A climbing wall is installed at the Track Zone, which offers thirty-one climbing routes. The venue can variously be configured to hold eighteen badminton courts, thirteen volleyball courts, ten basketball courts, three indoor soccer fields or sixteen table tennis tables. Within the oval running track is areas for in-field athletics. A rowing tank has been built at the facility.

Outside the venue is Water Sky Garden, a sculptural environment designed by Janet Echelman. A 91-meter (300 ft) boardwalk weaves through the pond and two 16-meter (52 ft) pedestrian bridges cross the pond to reach the Olympic Oval. Above the pond hangs the artist's "sky lantern" sculpture. The sculpture is made of Tenara architectural fibre, supported by painted galvanized steel rings. The entire garden is approximately 7,000 m^{2} (75,000 sq ft).

The oval is within walking distance of Lansdowne Station on the SkyTrain's Canada Line. Alternatively, the venue can be reached using the C94 bus, which connects to Richmond–Brighouse Station. Parking is available, with 450 parking spaces being located on the structure's lower level. The venue is in the immediate vicinity of Vancouver International Airport.

The roof won the 2009 Structural Awards Award for Sports or Leisure Structures. The other three entries nominated for the award were the roof of Wimbledon Centre Court, the elephant house at the Copenhagen Zoo, and Beijing National Stadium (also known as the Bird's Nest) used for the 2008 Summer Olympics and Paralympics.

== Events ==
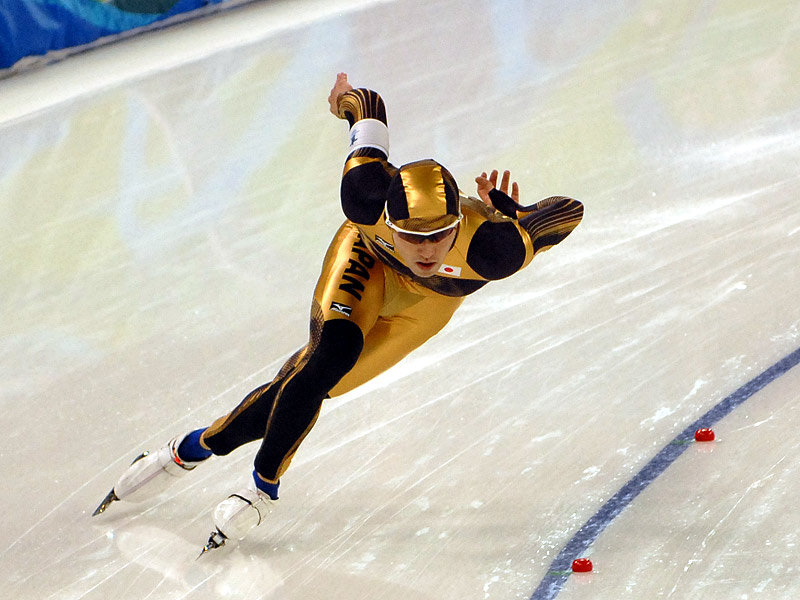
Japan's Keiichiro Nagashima competing in the men's 500 meters during the Olympics

Prior to the venue being official opened, there were international World Cup trials conducted from 17 to 20 October 2008. The first week after the venue opened, it was open to the public for speed skating. In its inaugural season, the oval was used for the Canadian Single Distance Championships from 27 to 31 December 2008, the BC Speed Skating Long Track Championships from 24 to 25 January 2009, the Canadian Junion Allround Championships 2009 from 30 to 31 January, the Canada Cup from 30 January to 1 February, the 2nd Masters International Canadian Open from 21 to 22 February and the 2009 World Single Distance Speed Skating Championships from 12 to 15 March.

The Olympic season saw international trials taking place on 17 to 20 October 2009, and 6, 8 and 10 February 2010. The 2010 Winter Olympics were conducted between 12 and 28 February. Twelve events were organized during the games, consisting of five individual and one team pursuit race for each gender. More than 100,000 people attended the Olympic events at the oval.

Major post-Olympic events include the 2010 World Wheelchair Rugby Championships, the 2011 World Masters Badminton Championships and 2012 ISKF National Karate Championship. In 2014, the venue selected to host to the 2014 Pacific Rim Gymnastics Championships.

== Track records ==
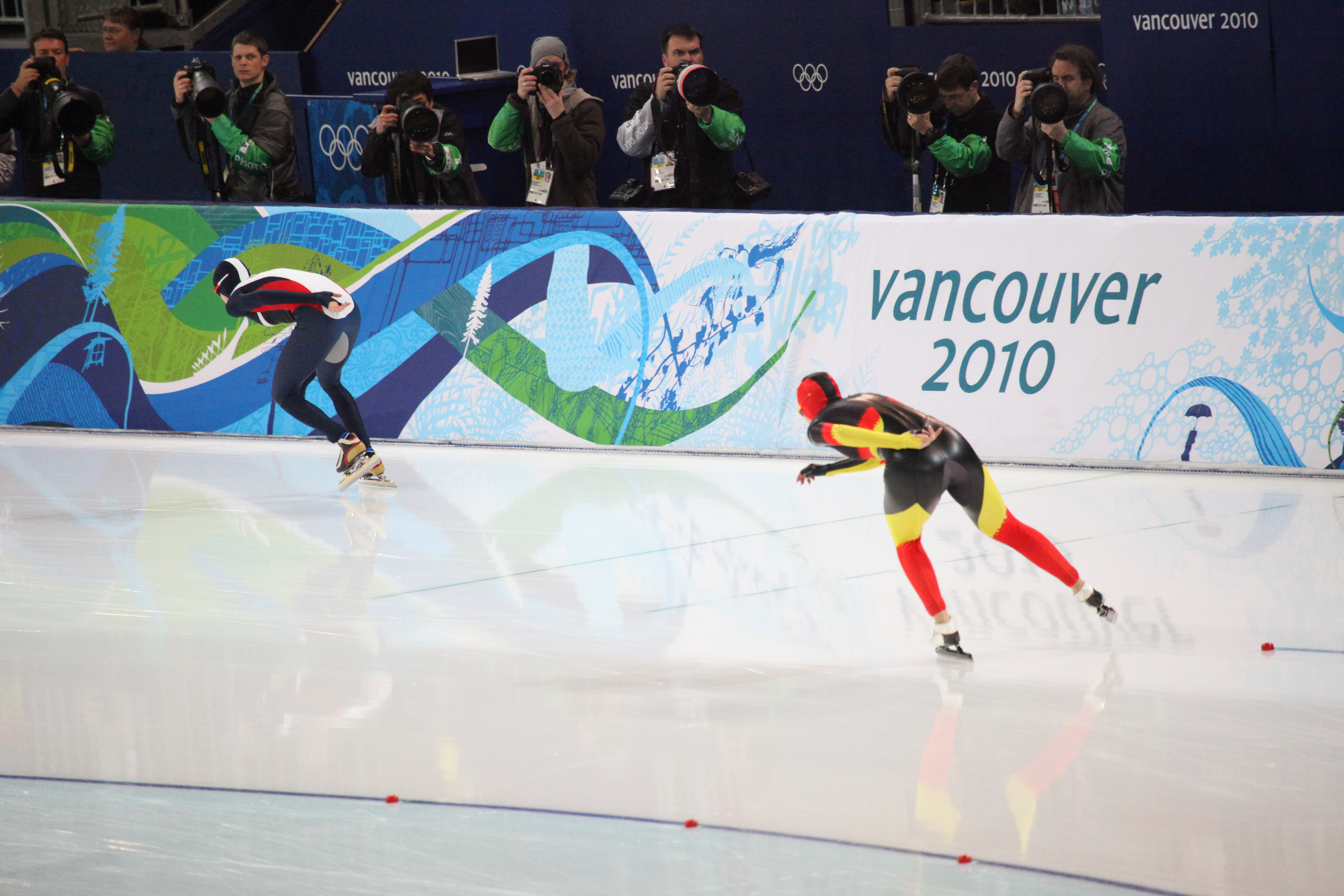
Germany's Daniela Anschütz-Thoms (right) and the Czech Republic's Martina Sáblíková at the women's 5000 meters during the Olympics; Sáblíková won and set a rink record in this race.

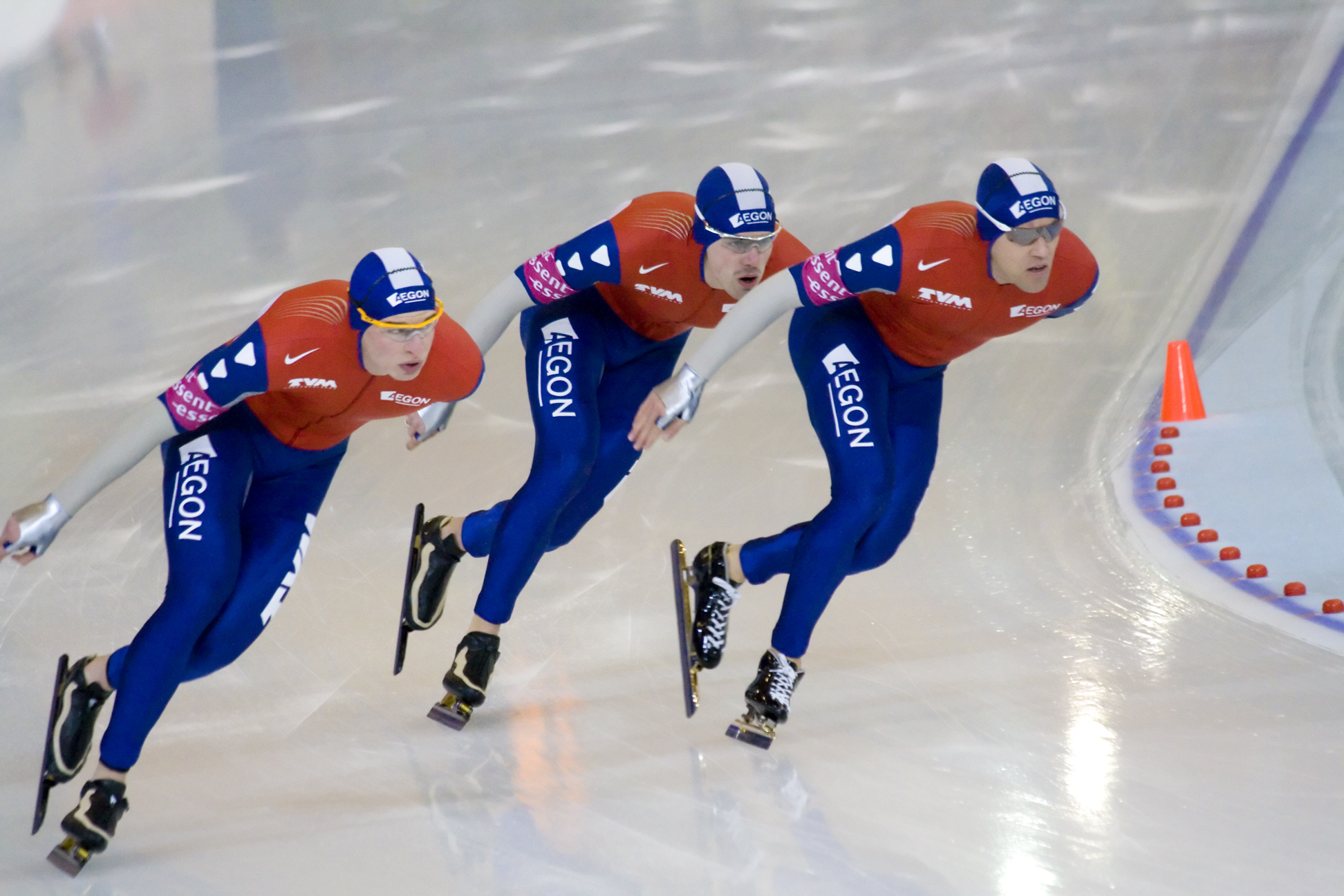
The Netherlands' Sven Kramer, Wouter olde Heuvel and Carl Verheijen in men's team pursuit during the 2009 World Single Distance Speed Skating Championships

The Richmond Olympic Oval is located at 4 meters (13 ft) above mean sea level (AMSL). The higher air pressure compared to high-elevation venues means that the venue will have slow ice, with the organizers not expecting any world records to be beaten during the Olympics. Three Olympic records were set in the oval; all but one of the remaining Olympic records have been set in Salt Lake City, located at an elevation of 1,300 meters (4,300 ft) AMSL, and all world records are set in Salt Lake City or Calgary, located at 1,000 meters (3,300 ft). As of 2013, the Richmond Olympic Oval is ranked as the world's eleventh-fastest ice. (Note: The fastest ice is measured by comparing the accumulative rink records of Olympic disciplines.)

Track records
Distance	Gender	Skater	Nationality	Time	Date	Note
500 m	Men	Lee Kang-seok	South Korea	34.80	15 March 2009	—
1000 m	Men	Shani Davis	United States	1:08.94	17 February 2010	—
1500 m	Men	Mark Tuitert	Netherlands	1:45.57	20 February 2010	—
3000 m	Men	Sven Kramer	Netherlands	3:40.51	6 February 2010	
5000 m	Men	Sven Kramer	Netherlands	6:14.60	13 February 2010	Olympic record
10000 m	Men	Sven Kramer	Netherlands	12:55.32	15 March 2009	—
Team pursuit 8 laps	Men	Jan Blokhuijsen; Sven Kramer; Mark Tuitert	Netherlands	3:39.95	27 February 2010	Olympic record
500 m	Women	Jenny Wolf	Germany	37.72	15 March 2009	—
1000 m	Women	Christine Nesbitt	Canada	1:16.28	14 March 2009	—
1500 m	Women	Christine Nesbitt	Canada	1:56.89	18 October 2009	(Note: Ireen Wüst also skated 1:56.89 at the 2010 Winter Olympics on 21 February 2010, winning a gold medal.)
3000 m	Women	Martina Sáblíková	Czech Republic	4:02.53	14 February 2010	—
5000 m	Women	Martina Sáblíková	Czech Republic	6:50.92	24 February 2010	—
Team pursuit 6 laps	Women	Kristina Groves; Christine Nesbitt; Brittany Schussler	Canada	2:58.25	15 March 2009	—
