= Canadian Floorball League =

Floorball league in Canada

Floorball League of Canada
- Sport: Floorball
- Founded: 2013
- Administrator: Floorball Canada
- No. of teams: 5
- Country: Canada
- Most recent champion: Ottawa Blizzard FC
- Website: floorballcanada.org

The Floorball League of Canada is the Floorball Canada-sanctioned, elite-level national floorball league that has teams located in Ontario and Quebec.

== History ==
The league began through an International Floorball Federation (IFF) mandate requiring all nations participating in the Floorball World Championships 1st division to have an organized, elite-level national league competing each year. The league was created in fall 2012 in order to assure Canada's participation in the 2014 Men's World Floorball Championships.

== Teams ==
All teams are currently located in Eastern Canada, with the inclusion of Western teams slated for future seasons.

Team	Location
Hamilton IBK	Hamilton, Ontario
Cambridge Floorball Club	Cambridge, Ontario
Club Floorball de Montréal	Montreal, Quebec
Ottawa Blizzard Floorball Club	Ottawa, Ontario
Toronto United	Toronto, Ontario

== Champions ==
2018-2019 Ottawa Blizzard

2017-2018 Ottawa Blizzard

2016-2017 Ottawa Blizzard

2015-2016 Ottawa Blizzard

2014-2015 Ottawa Blizzard

2013-2014 Cambridge Floorball Club

== Finalist ==
2015-2016 Club Floorball Montreal

2014-2015 Cambridge FC

2013-2014 Ottawa Blizzard FC
