= PTFE fiber =

PTFE fiber is a chemically resistant material. It is used in woven form in certain pump packings as well as in nonwoven form in hot gas bag filters for industries with corrosive exhausts.

== Production ==
Because PTFE is relatively insoluble and has a very high melting point, PTFE fibers can not be fashioned from conventional melt or solution spinning. Instead they are made by combining particles of PTFE with cellulose, forming fibers of the cellulose and then sintering the PTFE particles (and charring the cellulose). The remnant char gives the fiber a brown color. It can be bleached white, although this reduces the strength.

== See also ==
- Quartz fiber
