= Rowing tank =

Facility for indoor rowing

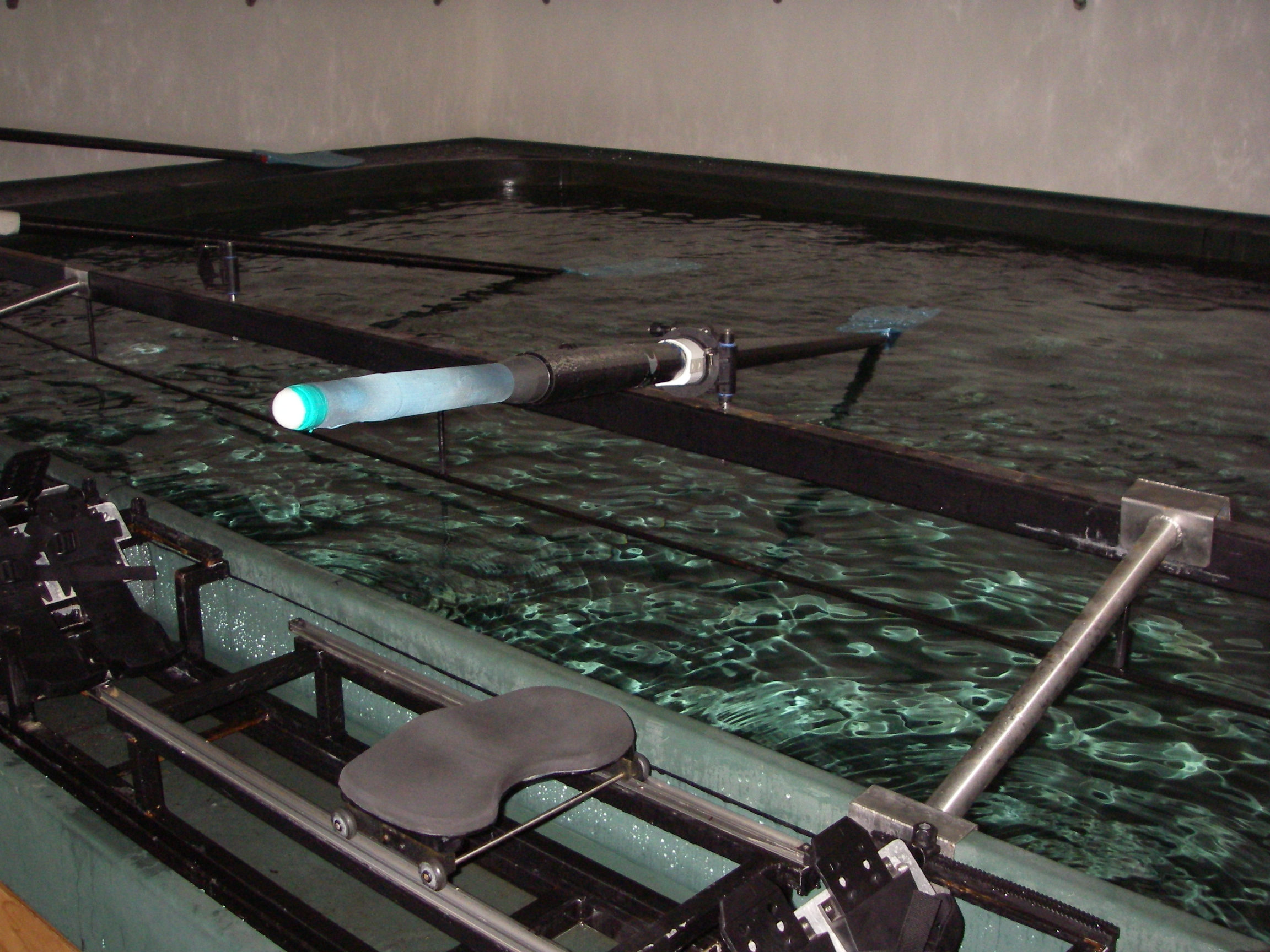
Four-oared indoor rowing tank at the Otago University Rowing Club in Dunedin, New Zealand

A rowing tank is an indoor facility which attempts to mimic some of the conditions rowers face on open water.

Rowers sit in fixed rowing positions, with a channel of water to either side of the 'boat'. Older tanks used the power of the athlete to circulate water. Modern tanks move the water past the rowers, simulating the feel of rowing a boat through open water.

Rowing tanks can be used for off-season rowing, muscle specific conditioning and technique training, or simply when bad weather does not allow for open water training.

Removing the need to balance the boat, a rowing tank can be a useful environment for introducing beginners to basic concepts of the sport. For experienced rowers, walkable access around the equipment provides opportunities for coaches to observe and work on aspects of rowing technique that can be challenging to address on open water.

== See also ==
- Rowbike
- Rowing
- Indoor rower
