= 2007 Canadian Floorball Championships =

The 2007 Canadian Floorball Championships were the first national championships in Canadian floorball. It was held in June 2007 in Montreal, Quebec. The province of Quebec captured the men's national championship, while the province of Ontario captured the national championship on the women's side. The 2007 Canadian Floorball Championships were also the first tournament sanctioned by Floorball Canada.

== Men's championship results ==
=== Preliminary round ===
Pos	Team	Pld	W	D	L	GF	GA	GD	Pts
1	Ontario	2	1	1	0	10	5	+5	3
2	Quebec	2	1	1	0	7	5	+2	3
3	Alberta	2	0	0	2	6	13	−7	0

June 2, 2007
08.45

Quebec	2–2	Ontario

Montreal, Quebec
Collège André Grasset

June 2, 2007
12.45

Alberta	3–5	Quebec

Montreal, Quebec
Collège André Grasset

June 2, 2007
15.15

Ontario	8–3	Alberta

Montreal, Quebec
Collège André Grasset

Note: All times are EST

=== Qualification round ===
The two teams at the bottom of the table after the preliminary round play each other in a qualification match to decide who plays in the championship match against the team at the top of the table. The losing team wins the bronze medal and captures 3rd place. The winning team is guaranteed at least 2nd place and a silver medal.

June 3, 2007
10.00

Alberta	2–7	Quebec

Montreal, Quebec
Collège André Grasset

Note: All times are EST

=== Championship match ===
The team at the top of the table at the end of the preliminary round receives an automatic bye into the championship match. They will play against the winner of the qualification round for the Canadian National Floorball Championship.

June 3, 2007
14.30

Ontario	3–4	Quebec

Montreal, Quebec
Collège André Grasset

Note: All times are EST

== Women's championship results ==
Since there are only two women's teams in the 2007 Canadian Floorball Championships, the teams play 2 games against each other, and the winner of the tournament is found using aggregate scoring.

June 2, 2007
10.45

Quebec	6–5 (6:5)	Ontario

Montreal, Quebec
Collège André Grasset

June 3, 2007
12.30

Quebec	3–7 (9:12)	Ontario

Montreal, Quebec
Collège André Grasset

Note: All times are EST

== Results ==
2007 Men's National Floorball Champions
Quebec Provincial Floorball Team

=== Men's Standings ===
Rk.	Team
1st place, gold medalist(s)	Quebec
2nd place, silver medalist(s)	Ontario
3rd place, bronze medalist(s)	Alberta

=== Women's Standings ===
Rk.	Team
1st place, gold medalist(s)	Ontario
2nd place, silver medalist(s)	Quebec

Preceded by No Previous Championships	Canadian; Floorball Championships; 2007	Succeeded by 2008 Canadian Championships; Calgary, AB
