= Floorball Canada =

Governing body of floorball in Canada

- IOC nation: CAN
- Sport: Floorball

History
- Year of formation: 1998

Affiliations
- International federation: International Floorball Federation (IFF)
- IFF member since: 1998
- National Olympic Committee: Canadian Olympic Committee

Elected
- President: Randy Sa'ad

Floorball Canada is the highest governing body for the sport of floorball in Canada. Floorball Canada is a self-governed organization which is recognized by the International Floorball Federation (IFF), Government of Canada, Sport Canada, and the Canadian Olympic Committee.

Floorball Canada organizes the Canada Cup every year, hosting teams from all across the country to compete in various divisions based on skill level. Floorball Canada organizes the elite-level national league (Floorball League of Canada as well as men's, women's, men's under-19, and women's under-19 national floorball teams. Floorball Canada has hosted the 2016 Women's under-19 World Championships in Belleville, Ontario, and the 2019 Men's under-19 World Floorball Championships in Halifax, Nova Scotia.

== Organization ==
Floorball Canada is divided into four regional federations: Alberta Floorball Association, British Columbia Floorball Federation, Floorball Ontario, and Québec Floorball Association. In the future, Floorball Canada will potentially add three more regional branches: Saskatchewan, Manitoba, and an Atlantic federation, which would include the three maritime provinces and Newfoundland and Labrador.

Floorball Canada has been an ordinary member of the International Floorball Federation since 2001. Canada was given membership as part of the IFF in 1998, and has been competing in World Championships since that time.

== See also ==
- Canada men's national floorball team
- Canada women's national floorball team
- Canada men's under-19 national floorball team
- Canada women's under-19 national floorball team
- Canadian Floorball League
