= Cala s'Alguer =

- Fishing village

- Location within Province of Girona Location within Catalonia Location within Spain
- Coordinates: 41.857°N 3.142°E
- Country: Spain
- Autonomous community: Catalonia
- Province: Girona
- Comarca: Baix Empordà
- Municipality: Palamós
- Elevation: 0 m (0 ft)
- Time zone: UTC+1 (CET)
  - Summer (DST): UTC+2 (CEST)

The Cala s'Alguer is a traditional fishing village on the Costa Brava coast of Catalonia, Spain. It is part of the municipality of Palamós, in the comarca of Baix Empordà and the province of Girona. The historical complex has been declared a cultural asset of national interest.

The settlement dates back to the 16th century, and reflects how much of the Costa Brava would have looked before the arrival of tourism. The fishermen's huts lie by the shoreline and are sheltered by wooded area above. The buildings were intended to store boats and fishing gear, with stone walls and Catalan-style ceramic vaults. They have terraces and natural ramps for mooring boats.

The GR 92 long distance footpath, which runs the length of the Mediterranean coast of Spain, passes behind and above the huts. To the north the path follows the coast to Platja de Castell and then takes an inland route through pine and cork oak forests to the resort of Calella de Palafrugell. To the south the path follows the coast past the old castle of Sant Esteve de Mar to the resort of La Fosca.

== Gallery ==
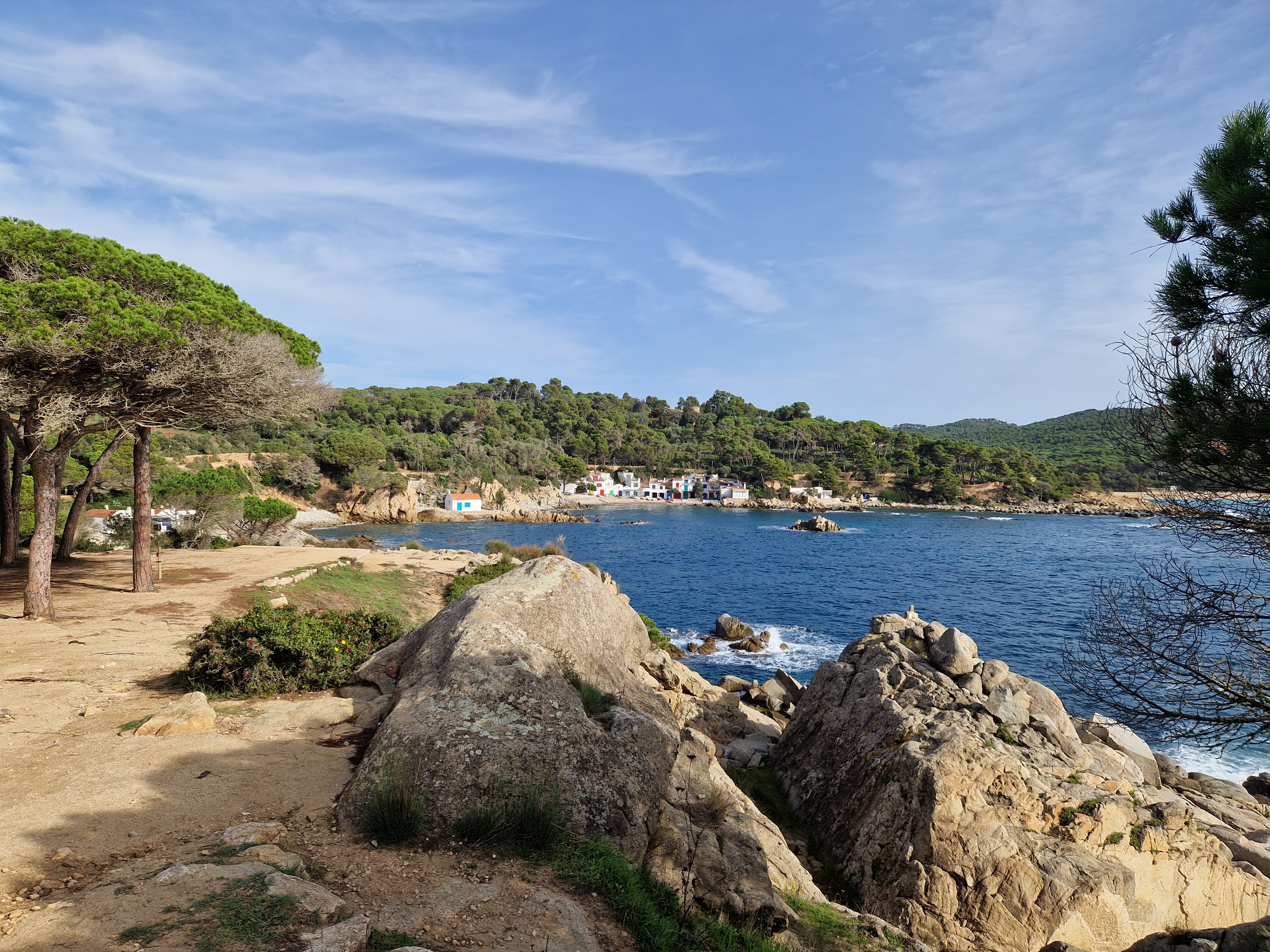
Approaching S'Alguer on the footpath from La Fosca

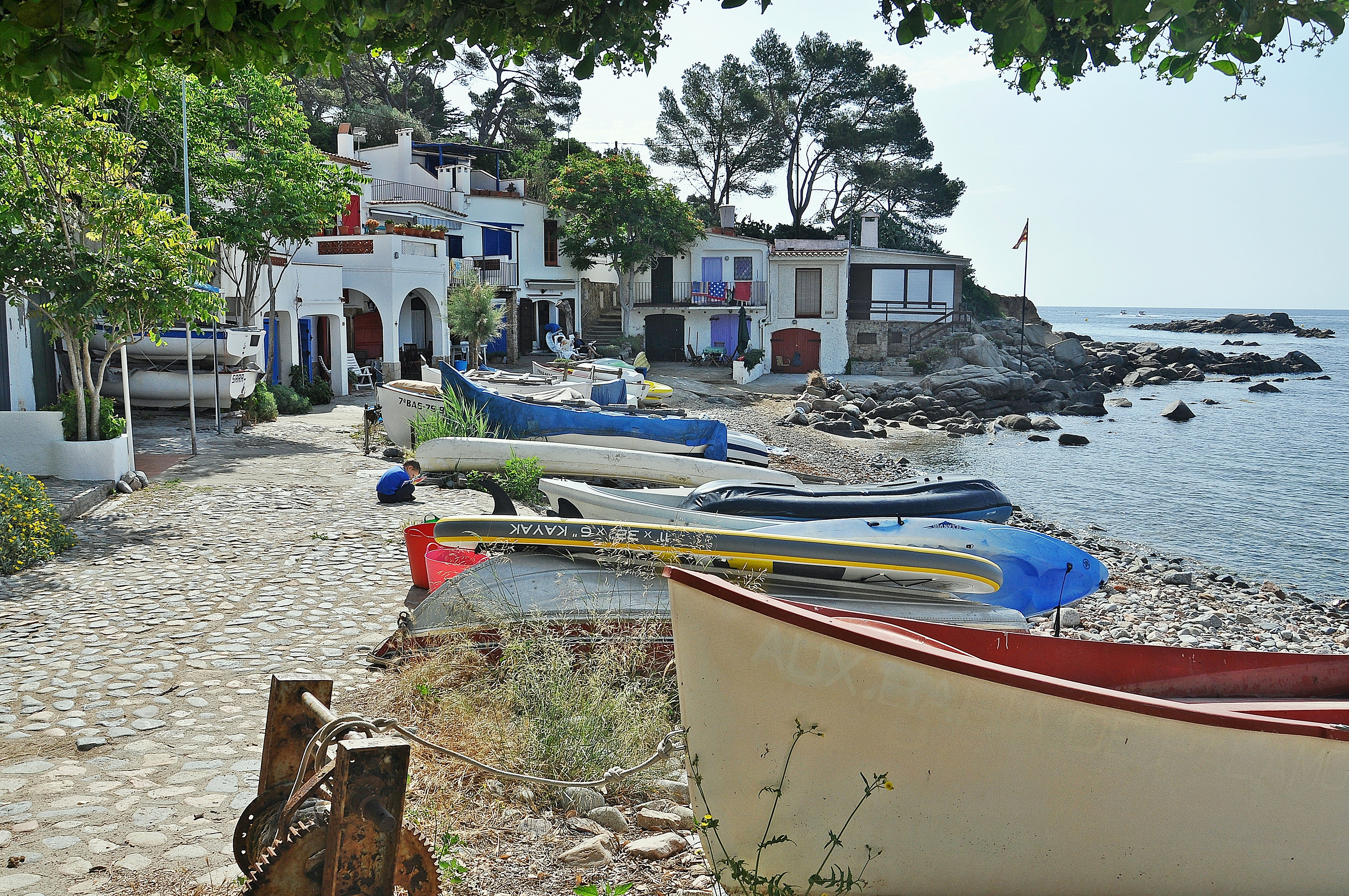
Looking north along the cove

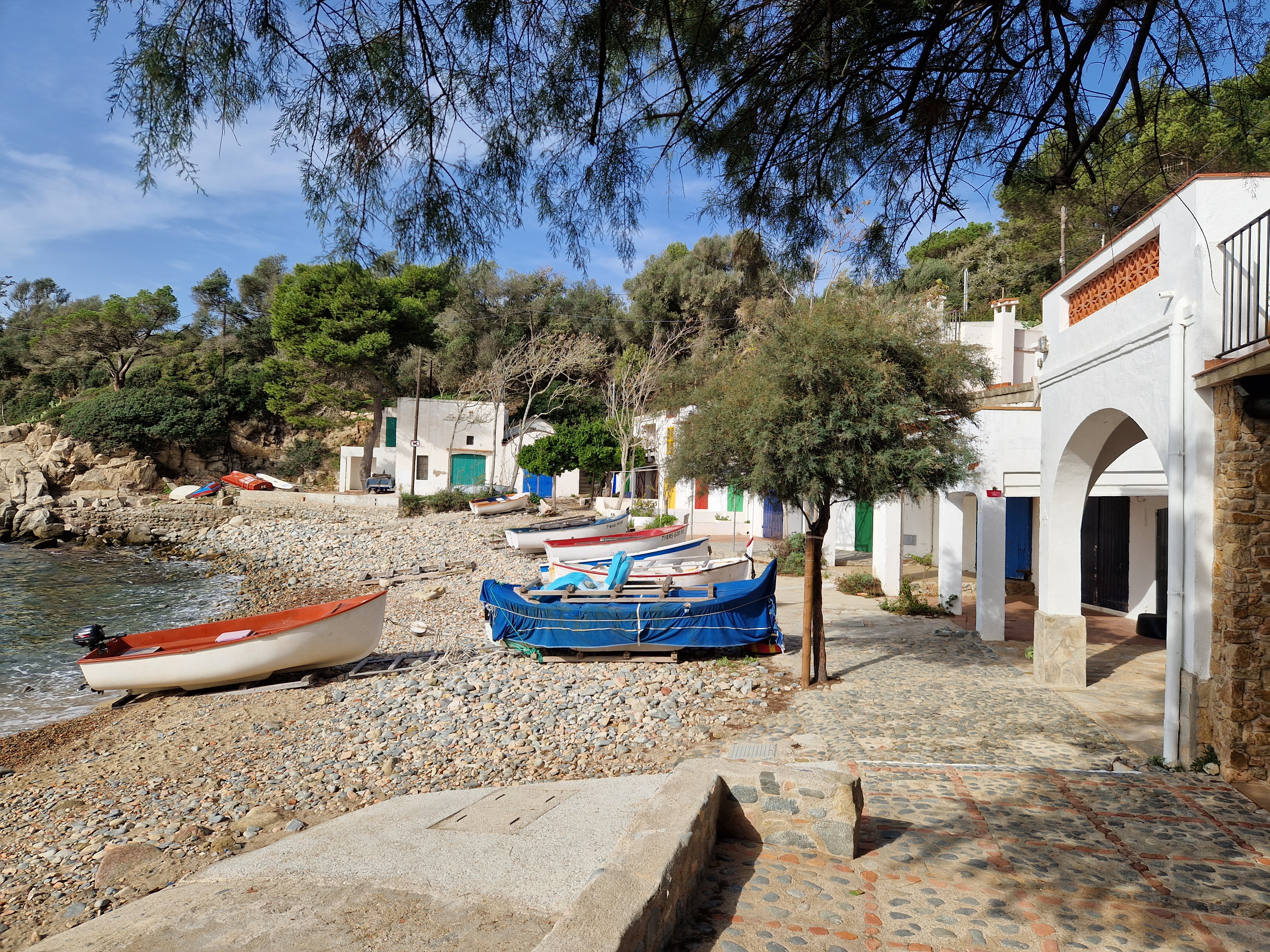
Looking south along the cove

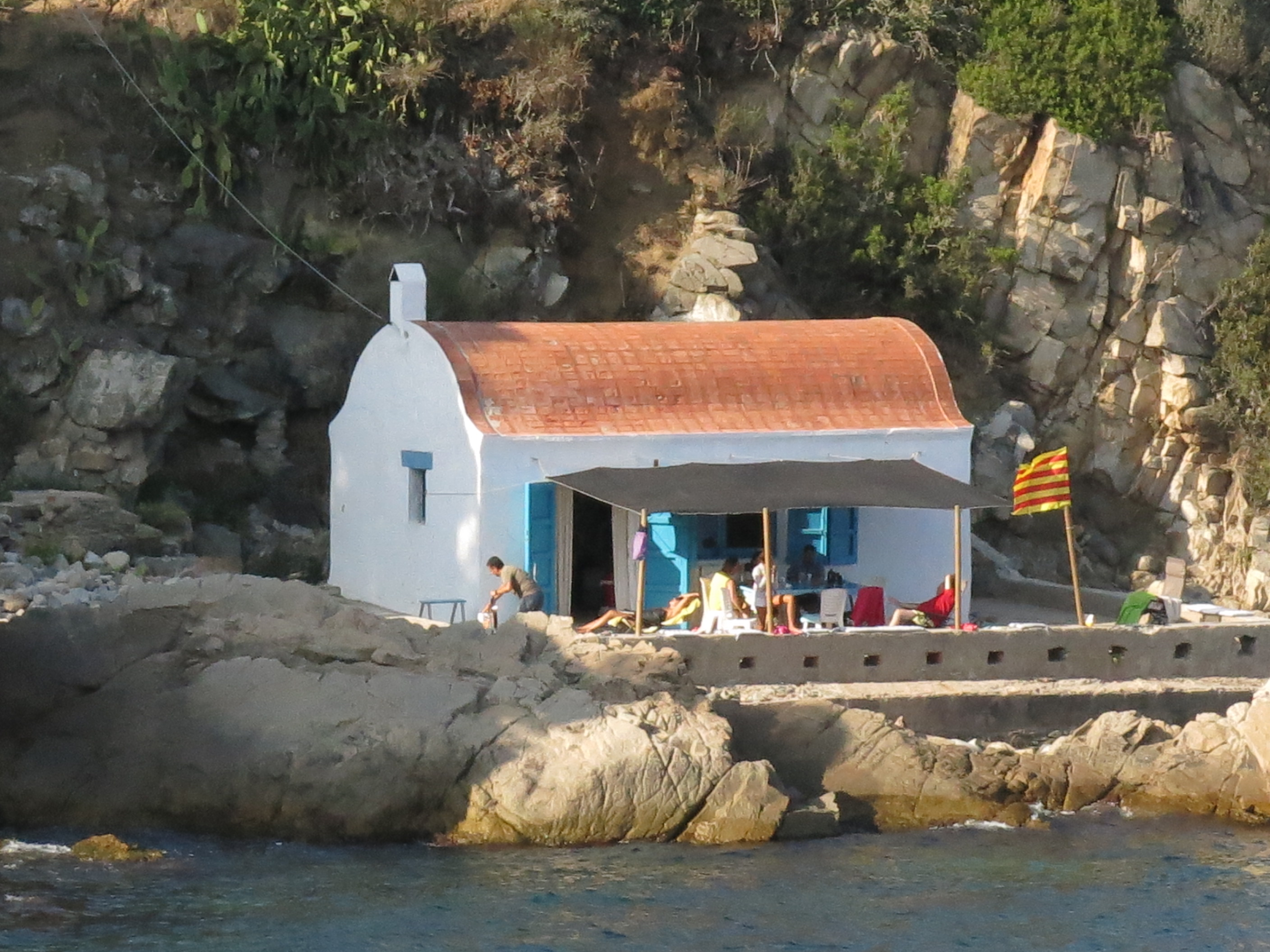
Barraca de la Cadena
