= La Fosca =

- Neighbourhood
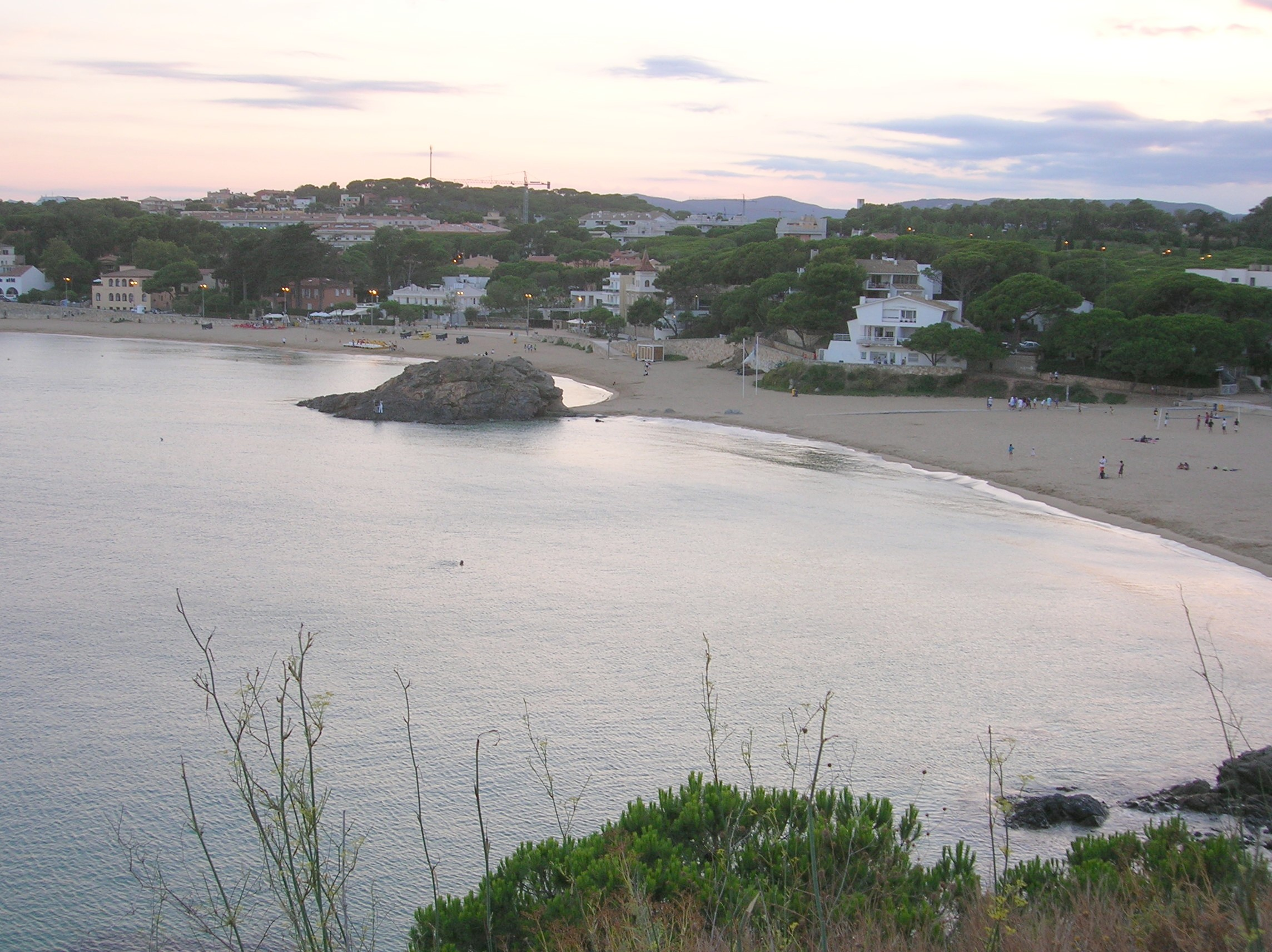
- The beach of La Fosca

- Location within Province of Girona Location within Catalonia Location within Spain
- Coordinates: 41.857°N 3.142°E
- Country: Spain
- Autonomous community: Catalonia
- Province: Girona
- Comarca: Baix Empordà
- Municipality: Palamós
- Elevation: 0 m (0 ft)
- Time zone: UTC+1 (CET)
  - Summer (DST): UTC+2 (CEST)

La Fosca is a neighbourhood of the town of Palamós and a beach on the Costa Brava, located in the comarca of Baix Empordà and the province of Girona in Catalonia, Spain. La Fosca is situated between the port of Palamós and the fishing settlement of S'Alguer. The town is by-passed by the C31 which connects the coastal towns of the central Costa Brava with Girona. Palafrugell lies 8.5 kilometres (5.3 mi) to the north and Castell-Platja d'Aro 7 kilometres (4.3 mi) to the south.

La Fosca is located at the northern end of a large bay, which is popular for swimming, sailing and windsurfing. Throughout most of the year very few people live there, but in summer the population of La Fosca grows quickly. La Fosca beach is known for the Roca Fosca, a large rock in the middle of the beach. Just to the east of the beach is the Castell de Sant Esteve de Mar, a ruined castle that predates the establishment of Palamós.

The GR 92 long-distance footpath, which runs the length of the Mediterranean coast of Spain, crosses the beach at La Fosca. To the north the path follows the coast past the castle to the fisherman's village at S'Alguer and takes an inland route through pine and cork oak forests to the resort of Calella de Palafrugell. To the south the path follows the coast to the town of Palamós.
