= The Cork Museum =

Museum in Catalonia, Spain

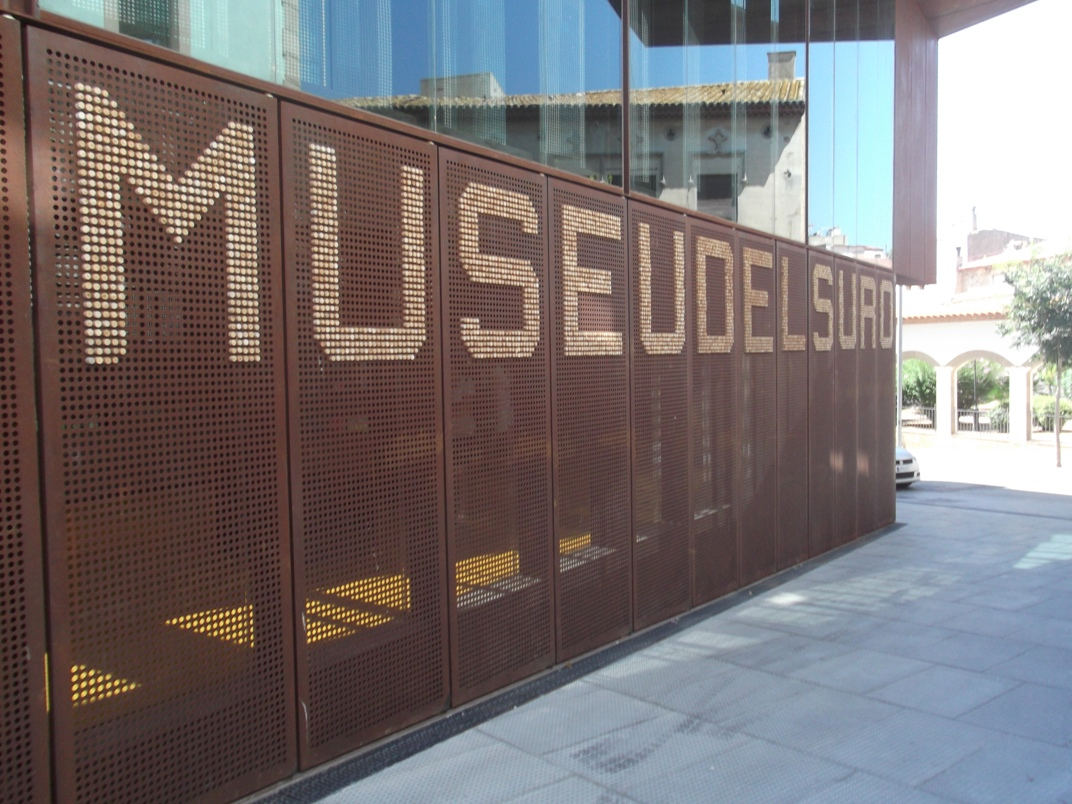
The Cork Museum in Palafrugell

The Cork Museum of Palafrugell, Spain, is a museum about the cork industry in Catalonia. Founded in 1972, the Cork Museum is part of the Costa Brava Museum Network and the Network of Local Museums of Catalonia in Girona.

The Cork Museum is located in a modernist factory around a small cork forest. The exhibition consists of an audiovisual space, a journey from the forest to work at the factory to obtain plugs, discs, paper and agglomerate, a space to experiment and a space for participation.

== The building ==
The Cork Museum is divided into three spaces. Two of them are heritage buildings (recognized as Bé Cultural d'Interès Local - BCIL, meaning a cultural heritage of local interest): the industrial buildings and Cal Ganxó. The third space, newly constructed, is a reception hall, installation space and warehouse.

=== Spaces ===
- Permanent exhibition - located on the ground floor and first floor
- Manufacturers' space - exhibition space
- Reception hall - welcome location for visitors and gift shop
- Geminus" space - workshops
- Miquel Auditorium

== History ==
In 1972, archaeologist Miquel Oliva and local researchers Joan Badia and Albert Recasens founded the Palafrugell Museum. At the beginning of the 1980s, the museum was divided to create the current Palafrugell archive, including a new monographic specialization on the cork industry.

In 1986, the first conservative square was created. In 1989, the Palafrugell Cork Museum became part of the National Museum of Science and Technology of Catalonia (mNACTEC). In 1991, the first permanent exhibition spaces were opened at the Tarongeta Street building.

On June 29, 2012 the Palafrugell Cork Museum opened a new headquarters in the modernist cork factory of Can Mario. It became the largest cork museum in the world.

== Other spaces ==
The Cork Museum also manages the Centre d'Interpretació del Dipòsit Modernista de Can Mario and the Conjunt Monumental de Sant Sebastià de la Guarda.

The Centre d'Interpretació del Dipòsit Modernista de Can Mario shows how that facility regulated the water supply and water pressure in the Can Mario cork factory. It is a Bé Cultural d'Interès Nacional - BCIN (cultural heritage of national interest) in Spain.

The Conjunt Monumental de Sant Sebastià de la Guarda is an historic site with a watchtower, an 18th-century hermitage and a 19th-century lighthouse.

The Cork Museum offers guided tours, educational activities and visits to both facilities.

=== Documentation center ===
The Cork Museum has a collection of 6,200 objects. It is also an important cork documentation center, that has received more than 2.000 inquiries.

== Bibliography ==
- Fernàndez, M. (coord.) i alt. El Museu del Suro de Palafrugell. Quaderns de Didàctica i Difusió-7. Publicacions del Museu de la Ciència i de la Tècnica de Catalunya.
- ESPADALÉ, Pep: «El Museu del Suro de Palafrugell: un passat amb feina feta i un futur ambiciós». Revista del Baix Empordà, núm. 29, juny-set. 2010.
