= Palamós =

Palamós i Sant Joan
- Municipality
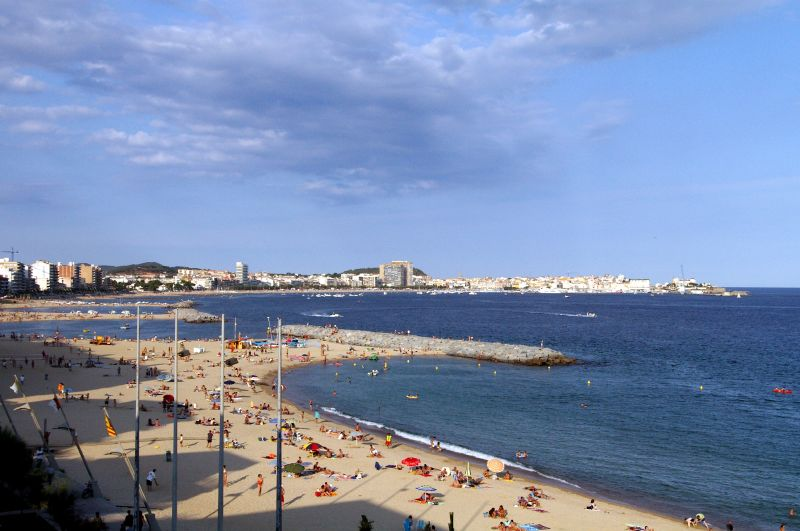
- View of Palamós i Sant Joan from the beach of Sant Antoni de Calonge

- Coat of arms

- Location within Province of Girona Location within Catalonia Location within Spain
- Coordinates: 41°51′00″N 3°07′45″E
- Country: Spain
- Community: Catalonia
- Province: Girona
- Comarca: Baix Empordà

Government
  - Mayor: Lluis Puig Martorell (2015)

Area
  - Total: 14.0 km^{2} (5.4 sq mi)
- Elevation: 30 m (98 ft)

Population (2025-01-01)
  - Total: 18,933
  - Density: 1,350/km^{2} (3,500/sq mi)
- Demonym: Catalan: Palamosí (m) Palamosina (f)
- Website: www.palamos.cat

Palamós i Sant Joan (Catalan pronunciation: [pələˈmos i ˈsan ʒuˈan]) is a resort town and municipality in the Mediterranean Costa Brava, located in the comarca of Baix Empordà, in the province of Girona, Catalonia, Spain. Palamós i Sant Joan is located at the northern end of a large bay. The town is by-passed by the C31 which connects the coastal towns of the central Costa Brava with Girona. Palafrugell lies 8.5 kilometres (5.3 mi) to the north and Castell-Platja d'Aro 7 kilometres (4.3 mi) to the south. The town is a popular tourist destination in the summer along the Costa Brava, the coastline which spans the Northern part of Catalonia up to the French border.

Palamós i Sant Joan is a staging point on the GR 92 long distance footpath, which runs the length of the Mediterranean coast of Spain. Stage 8, to the north, follows the cliffs to the beach at La Fosca before taking an inland route to Calella de Palafrugell and then following the coast again through Llafranc, Tamariu and Fornells de Mar to the next staging point at Begur, a distance of 23.0 kilometres (14.3 mi). Stage 9, to the south, follows the beachfront promenade to Sant Antoni de Calonge and then the coast through Platja d'Aro and S'Agaró to the next staging point at Sant Feliu de Guíxols, a distance of 16.8 kilometres (10.4 mi).

== History ==
The first evidence of human settlement in the Palamós i Sant Joan area is the Dolmen de Montagut, on the top of Montagut hill between Palamós i Sant Joan and Vall-llobrega. Dating from the 3rd or 2nd millennium BC, this has 3 slabs in their original state and the remains of a tomb that these once covered.

Evidence exists of an early settlement lies around 1.7 kilometres (1.1 mi) north-east of the town, on a rocky promontory at the north end of Platja de Castell beach. The Castell de la Fosca is a stone settlement of the Iberian Indigetes people which seems to have been inhabited from the 6th century BC to the 1st century AD.

Further south than the Castell de la Fosca, but still north of the current town and port, is the Castell de Sant Esteve de Mar. Archaeological evidence suggests that this site was occupied from the Roman period, and that the site was fortified in the twelfth century AD. By the thirteenth century, Peter II of Barcelona (also known as Peter III of Aragon) was looking to found a new port on the coast as the previous royal port in the region at Torroella de Montgrí on the River Ter had silted up. In 1277, he bought the castle and its estate, which included the site of the current port, with that in mind. As a consequence of the purchase, Palamós was founded and recognised as a village on 3 December 1279.

The site of the current port was used during the Roman period and before, but it was then disused until it was rebuilt after Peter's purchase of 1277. In 1285, the Battle of Les Formigues was fought near the Formigues Islands, just offshore from Palamós, resulting in a victory for the Catalan fleet over the French.

Palamós i Sant Joan was the birthplace of Frederic Pujulà i Vallès (1877–1962), a journalist and dramatist who was a pioneer of Esperanto literature.

Palamós i Sant Joan was served by the 750 mm (2 ft 5 1/2 in) gauge Palamós–Girona–Banyoles railway, which reached a junction with the Barcelona–Cerbère railway at Flaçà by 1887 and was extended to Girona by 1921. Service on the line continued until 1956.

== Economy ==
The town is a major port (with the closure of Sant Feliu de Guíxols the only commercial harbour in the Province of Girona) with one of the last remaining fishing fleets on this part of the Mediterranean coast. It is famous for the locally caught prawns from Palamós (Catalan: gambes).

The town's major economic activities until the second half of the 20th century were fishing and cork manufacturing. In the sixties, however, the town saw a rapid growth of tourism. The architecture of Palamos i Sant Joan itself remained relatively unchanged with most development focused to the south at Sant Antoni de Calonge which now merges with Palamos i Sant Joan. The bay between the two is popular for sailing, swimming and windsurfing. The town's nightlife is focused on the old port which is surrounded by bars and restaurants.

== Sport ==
The town is home to Palamós CF the local football club. The oldest club in Catalonia. They share their ground, the Estadi Palamós Costa Brava with the small, but over-achieving club UE Llagostera, as the club's stadium, Estadi Municipal de Llagostera, didn't meet the LFP criteria.

== Gallery ==
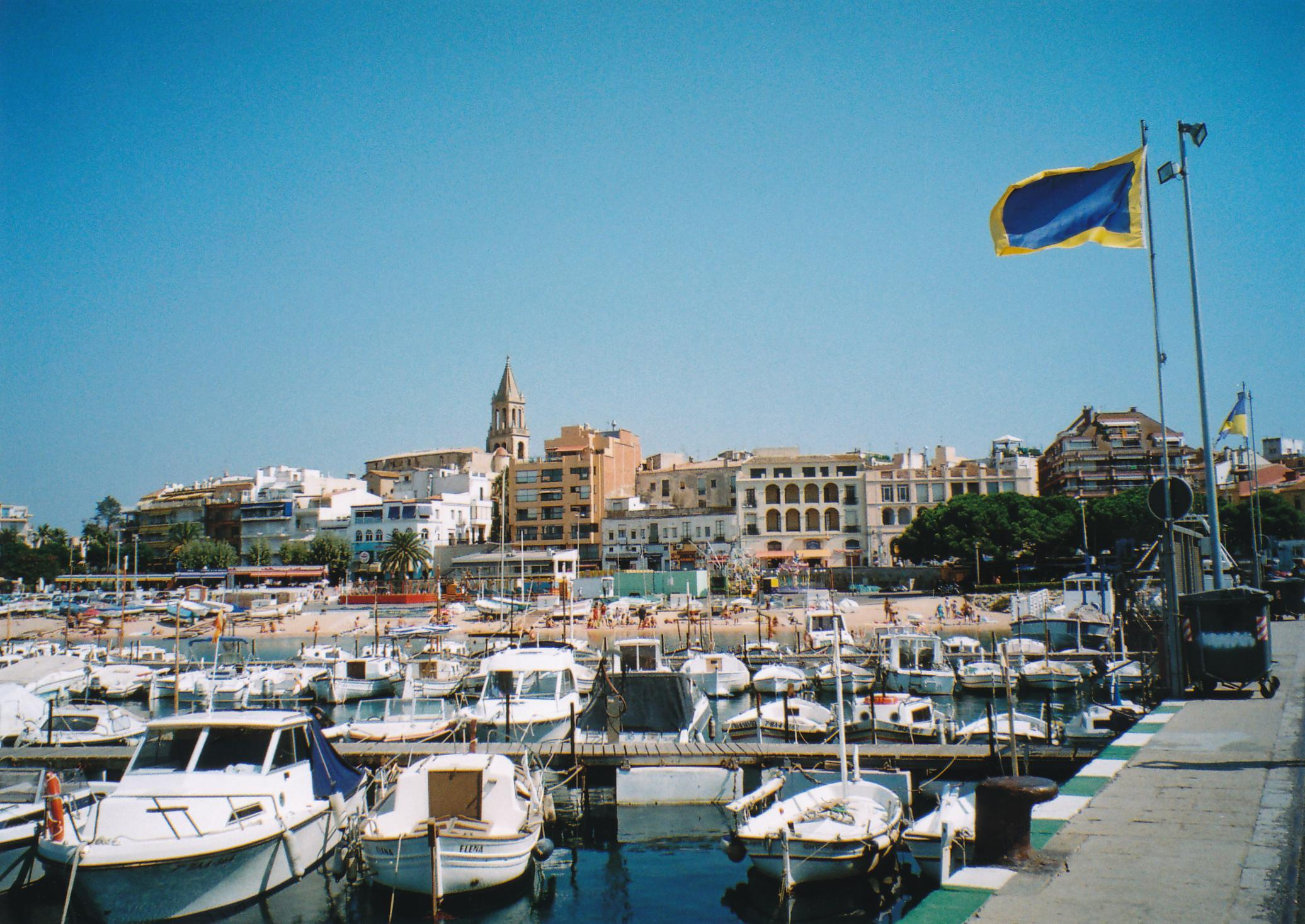
Palamós i Sant Joan

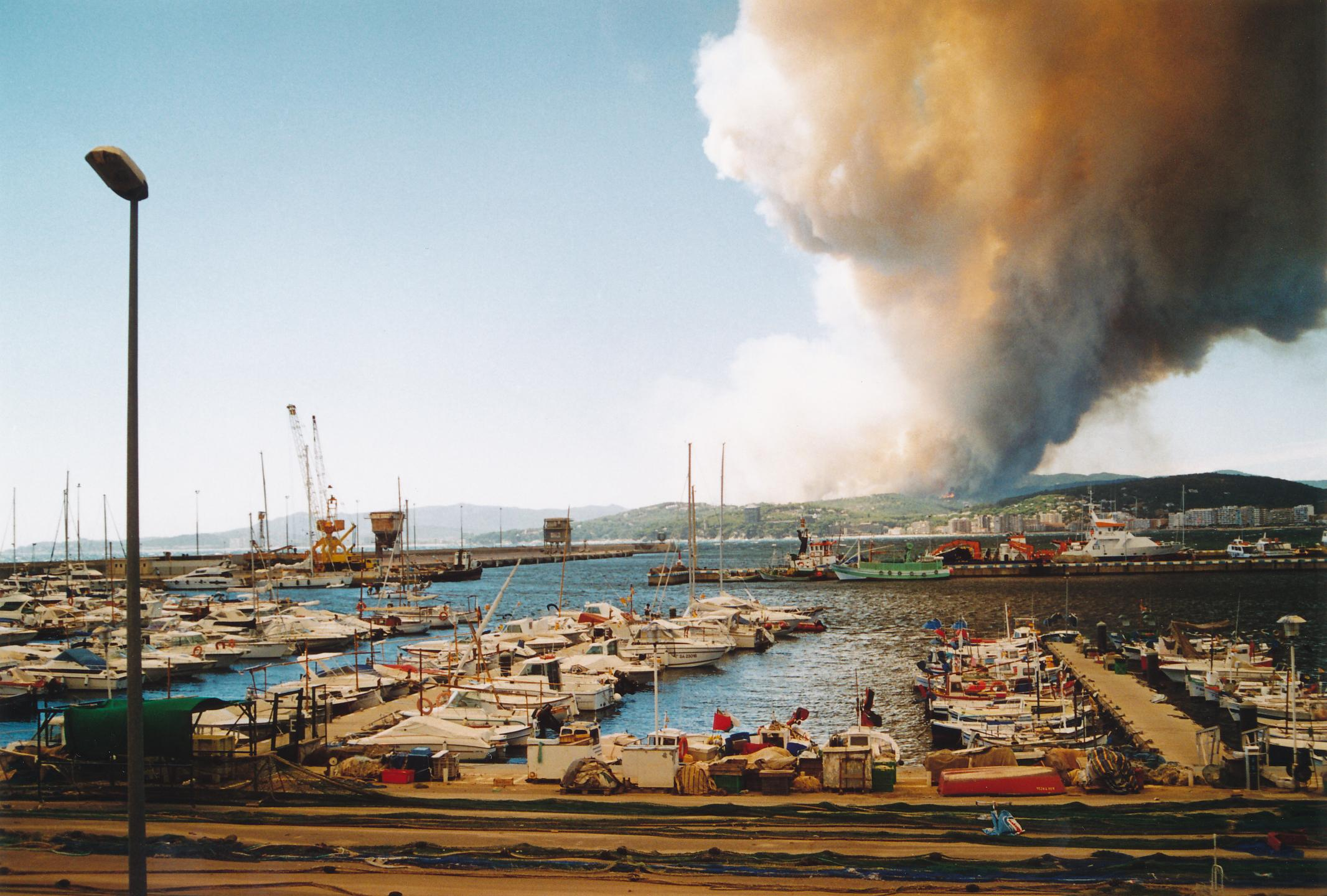
The port; in the background a forest fire near Platja d’Aro

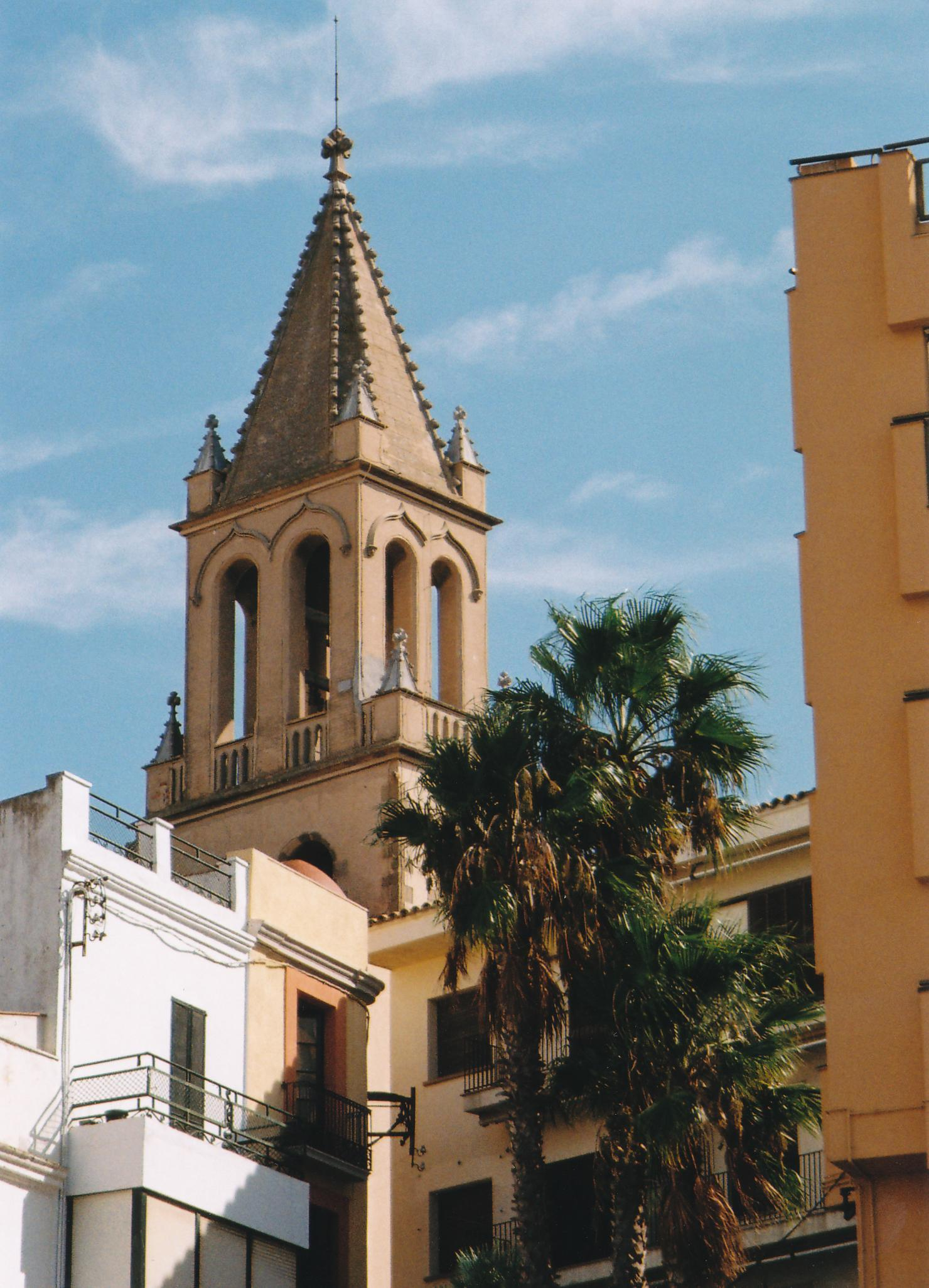
The church Santa Maria del Mar

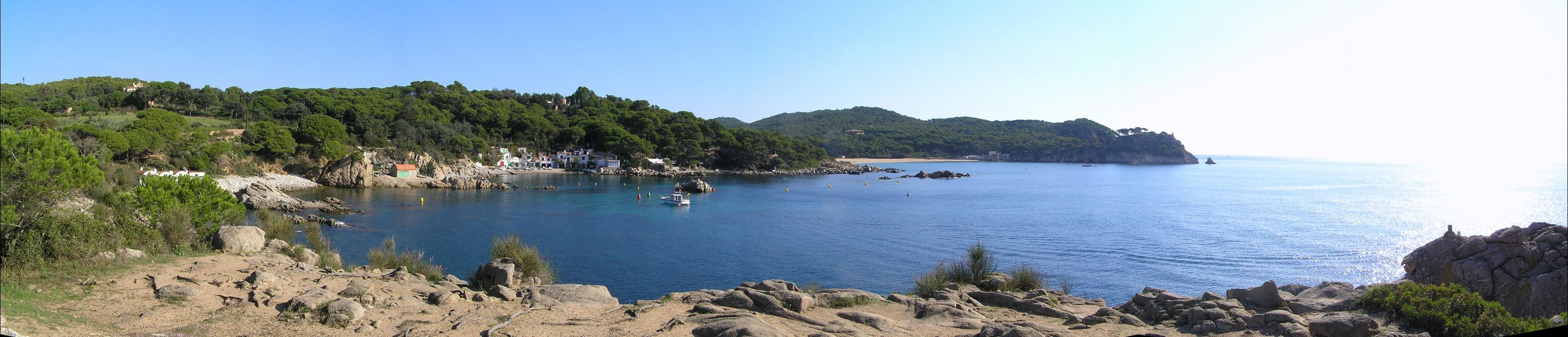
Cala S'Alguer, Palamós

== Bibliography ==
- Panareda Clopés, Josep Maria; Rios Calvet, Jaume; Rabella Vives, Josep Maria (1989). Guia de Catalunya, Barcelona: Caixa de Catalunya. ISBN 84-87135-01-3 (Spanish). ISBN 84-87135-02-1 (Catalan).
