= Calella de Palafrugell =

- Town
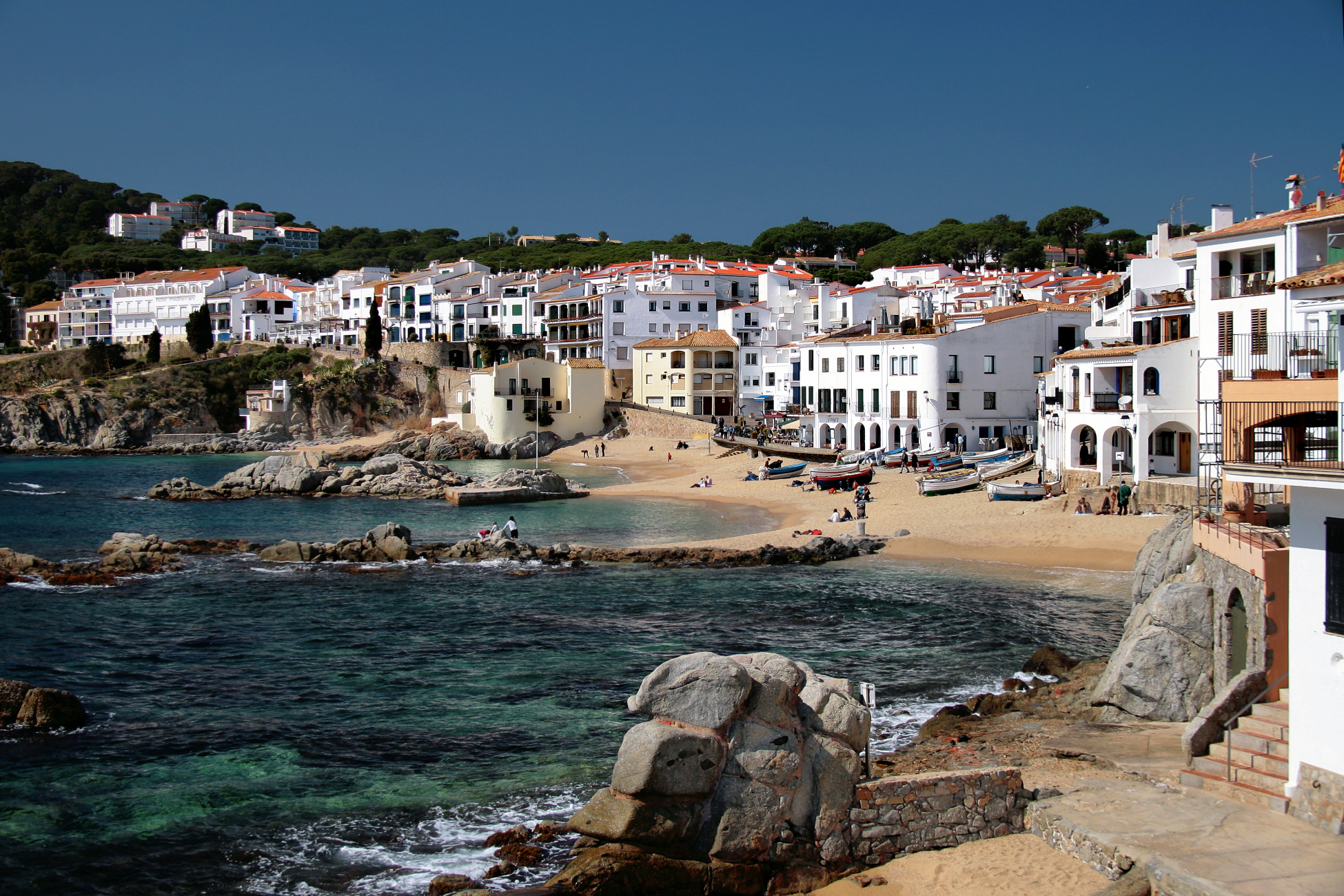
- Calella de Palafrugell

- Location within Province of Girona Location within Catalonia Location within Spain
- Coordinates: 41°53′16″N 3°11′00″E
- Country: Spain
- Autonomous community: Catalonia
- Province: Girona
- Comarca: Baix Empordà
- Municipality: Palafrugell
- Elevation: 0 m (0 ft)
- Time zone: UTC+1 (CET)
  - Summer (DST): UTC+2 (CEST)

Calella de Palafrugell is one of three coastal towns belonging to the municipality of Palafrugell in the province of Girona, Catalonia, Spain. The other two towns are Llafranc, only one kilometre (0.62 mi) to the north, and Tamariu, some four kilometres (2.5 mi) to the north. All three towns are part of the Costa Brava, the coastal region of northeastern Catalonia, in the comarca of Baix Empordà. It should not be confused with the larger, more commercialised resort of Calella, which is further south towards Barcelona, in the comarca of Maresme.

Calella de Palafrugell does not have the large hotels and mass tourism of other Costa Brava resorts such as Lloret de Mar. The town has a number of hotels, apartments and, at a distance from the beach, some campsites. Like much of the section of the Costa Brava, north of Palamos and south of L'Estartit, Calella has moved upmarket in recent times and offers restaurants and hotels. The beaches are Blue Flag standard. Calella de Palafrugell is a destination dominated by apartments blocks set just back enough not to be seen from the beach.

The town's origin is that of a fishing village, and its old maritime quarter, the Port Bo has been declared a cultural asset of national importance. This quarter retains the original layout of the village, with its traditional white porched buildings. It includes the complex of vaults, originally used to sew nets and auction fish, but now occupied by restaurants. The vaults are fronted by the beaches of Platja del Port de Malaspina and Platja de Portbò, which formed a natural fishing port and are still home to a fleet of small fishing boats. Also in Port Bo is the Sa Perola Interpretation Centre, housed in a former net dyeing house and now used as a tourist office and interpretation centre for the fishing industry and maritime heritage of the district.

Calella de Palafrugell has a number of small coves and beaches linked via a well engineered coastal walk known as the Cami de Ronda, passing along the cliffs and through several tunnels on the way. From the north the first of the beaches is Platja del Canadell, with its beach restaurant. Platja del Port de Malaspina, Platja de Portbò and Platja d'en Calau are linked sandy coves located in the centre of Calella. These are followed by Platgeta d'en Cosme, Platje de Port Pelegri, Platja de Sant Roc and Platja del Golfet, the last of which is approximately 1.5 kilometres (0.93 mi) from central Calella.

Beyond Platja del Golfet is the Cap Roig headland, where the Castell de Cap Roig is situated, surrounded by large botanical gardens. The castle has also been declared a cultural asset of national importance. The castle was built, and the gardens created, between 1929 and 1975, by Nicholas Woevodski and Dorothy Webster. The Cap Roig Festival, a music and dance festival, is held in the gardens between July and August.

The GR 92 long-distance footpath, which runs the length of the Mediterranean coast of Spain, passes along the Cami de Ronda. To the north of Platja del Canadell the path follows the coast the short distance to Llafranc, passing the 16th century Torre de Calella on the way. To the south the path takes an inland route from Platja del Golfet, bypassing Cap Roig through pine and cork oak forests to the fisherman's village at S'Alguer and the beach at La Fosca.

== Gallery ==
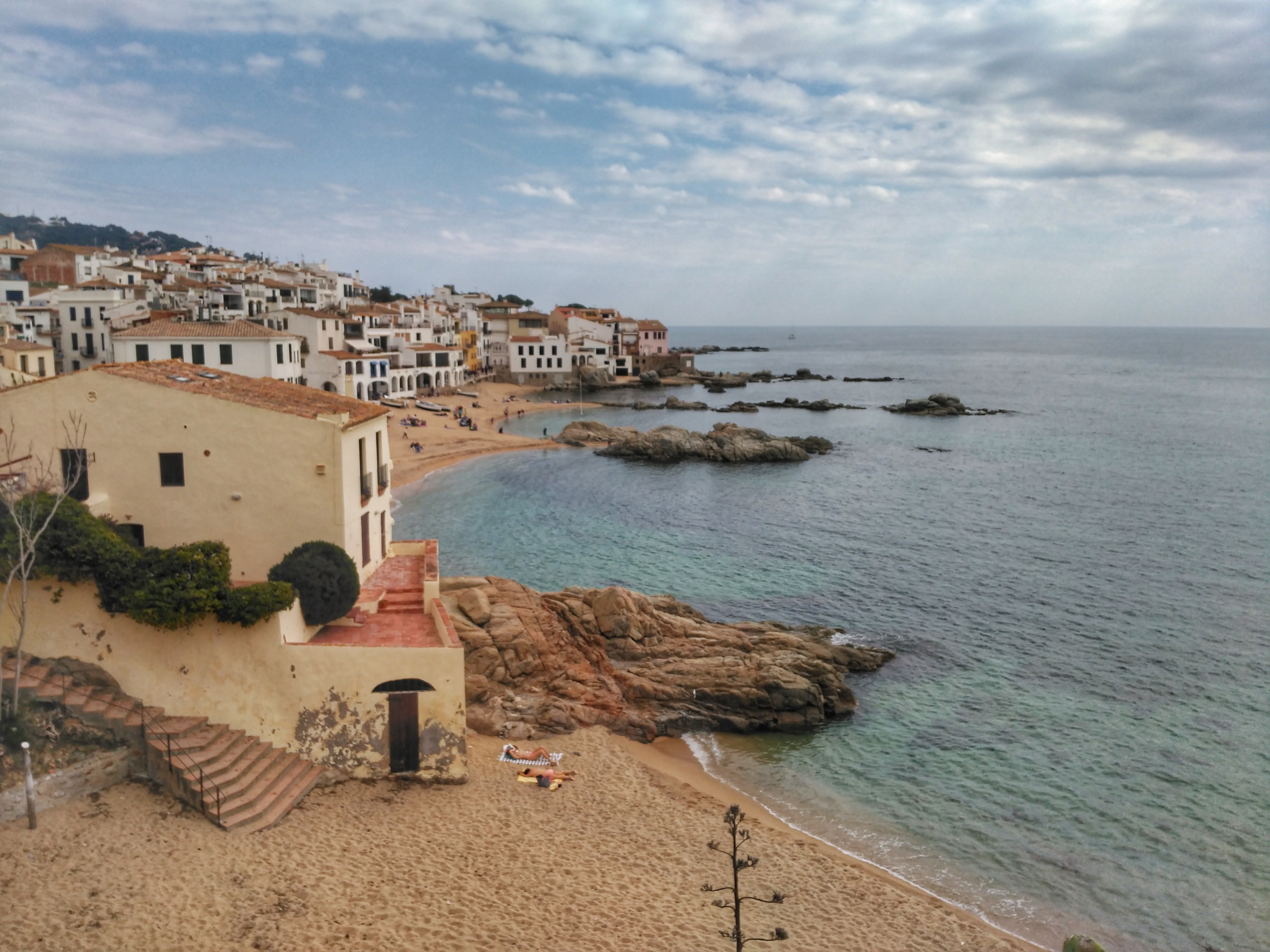
Beaches at Calella

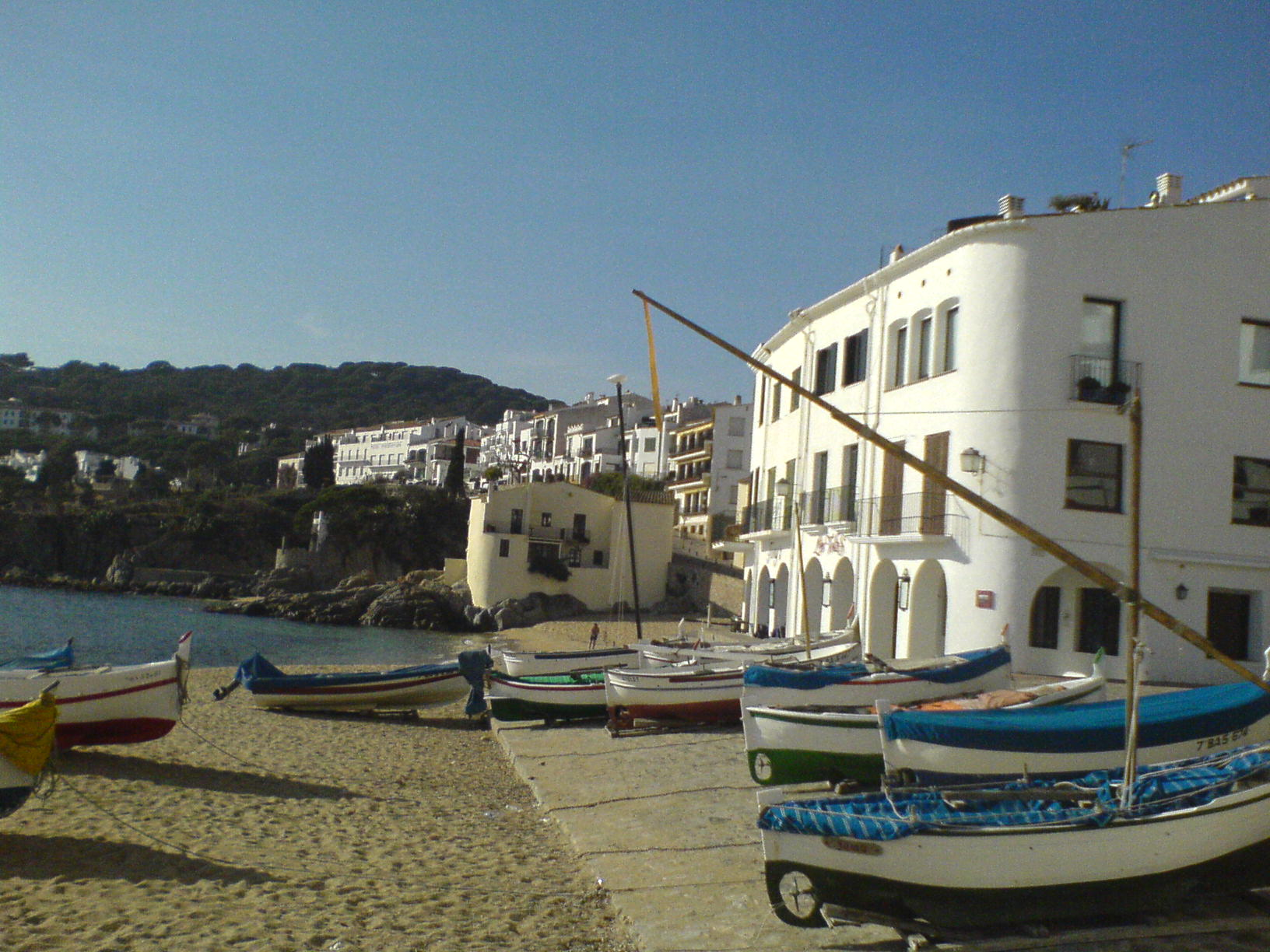
Waterfront at Calella

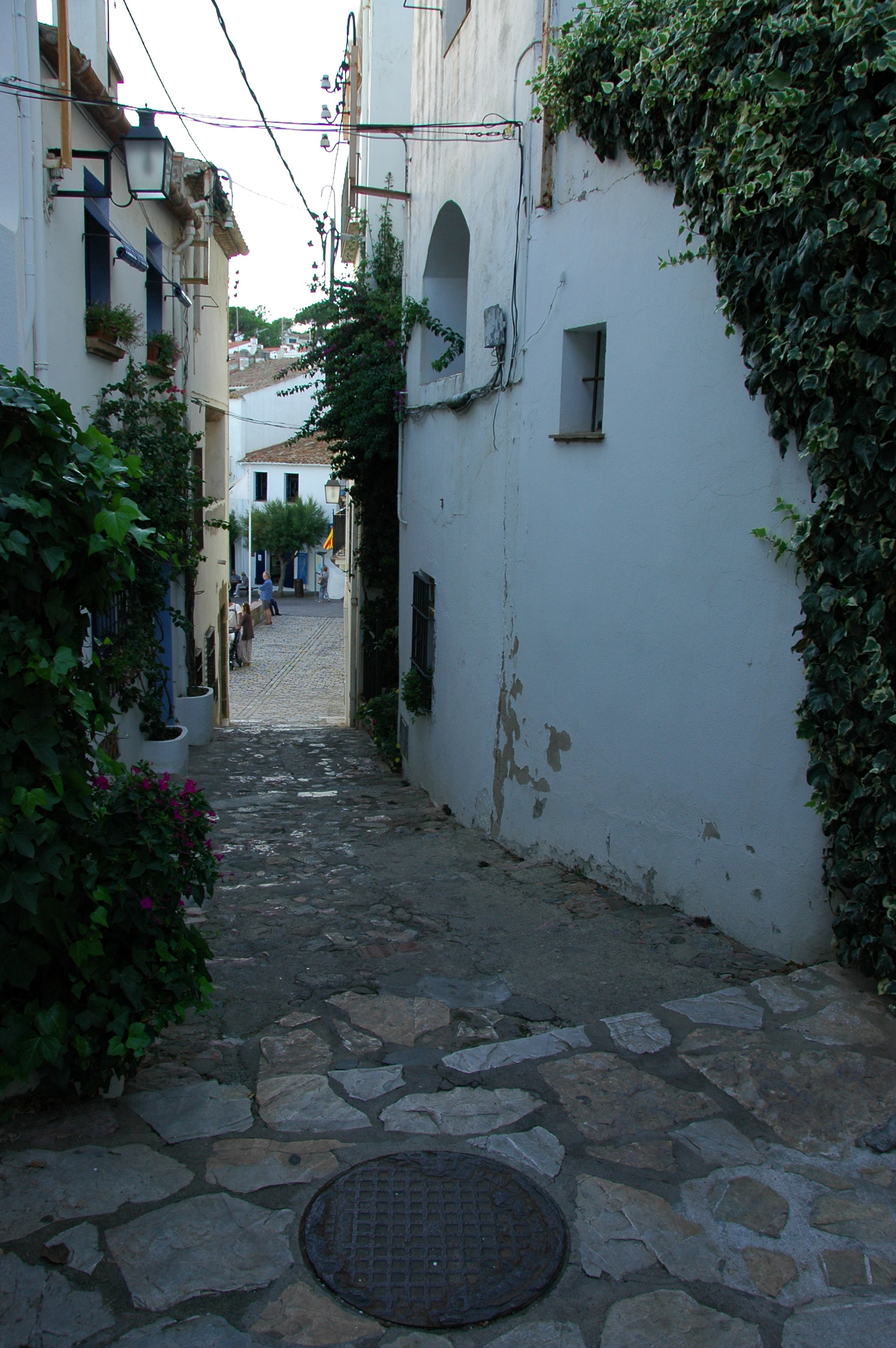
Street in Calella

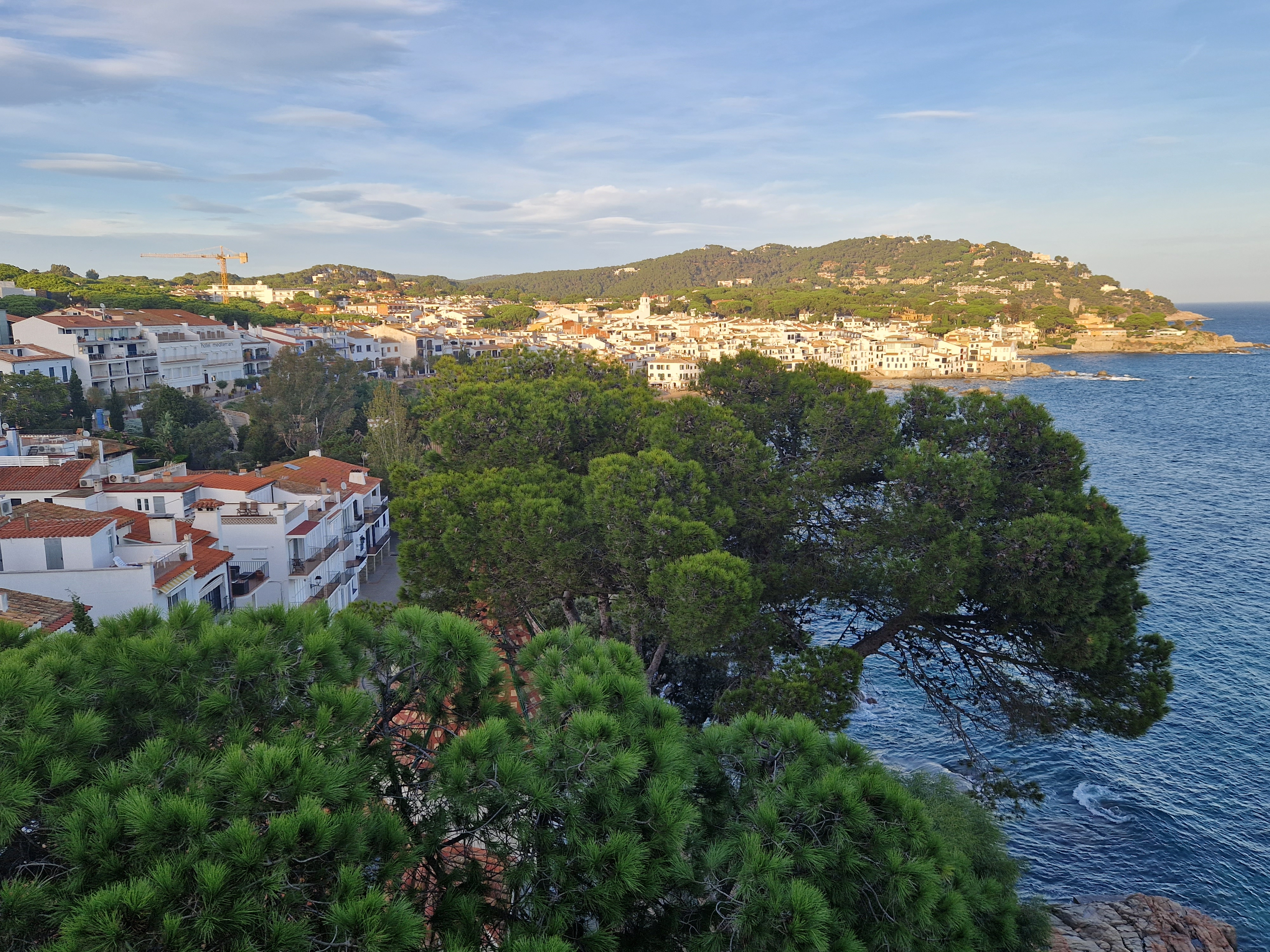
View of Calella by day

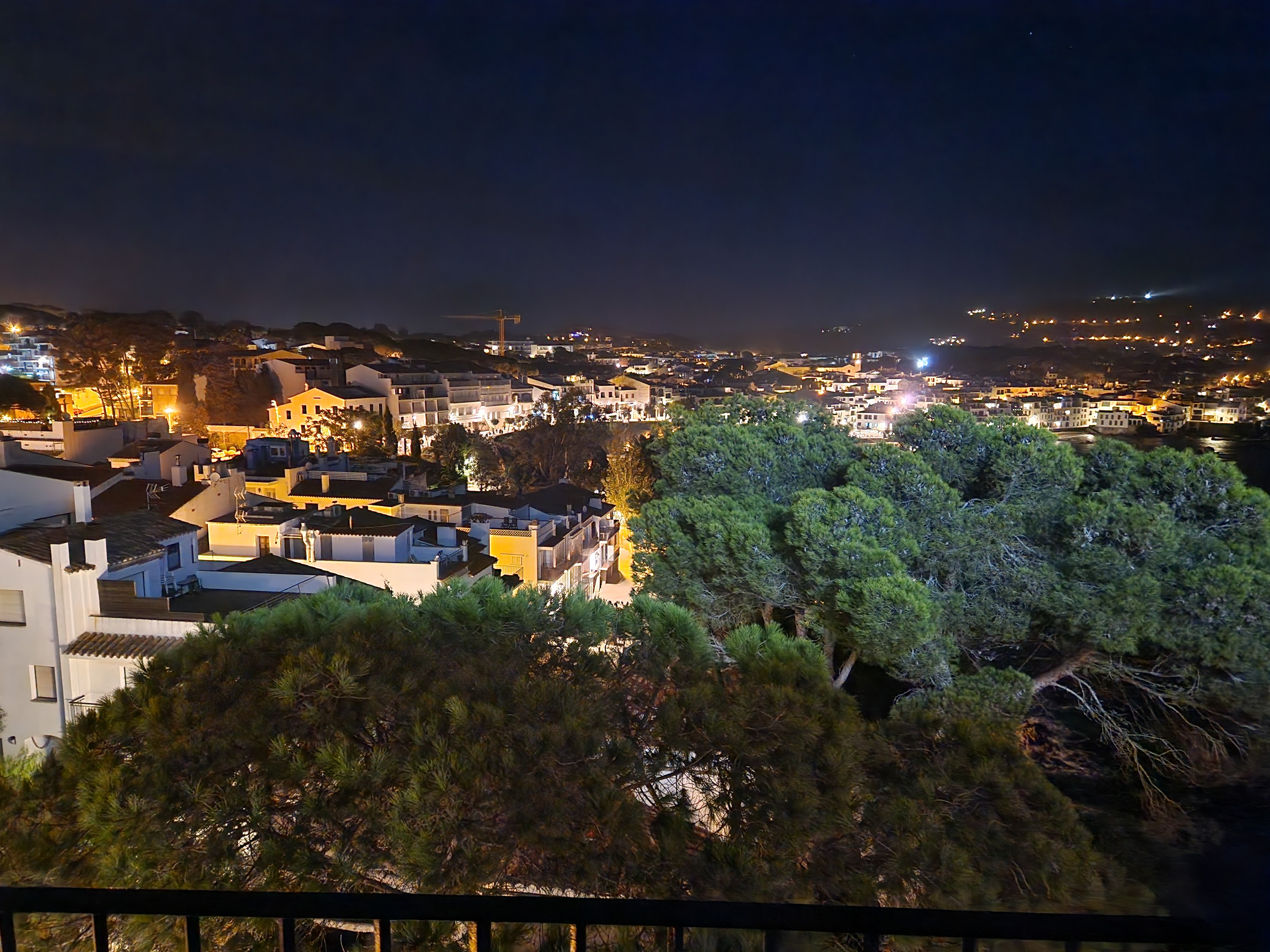
View of Calella by night

== Bibliography ==
- Catalunya and the Costa Brava (Lonely Planet Travel Guides) ISBN 978-1-74059-381-6
- Costa Brava (Rough Guide Directions) ISBN 978-1-84353-439-6
