= Josep Costa Sobrepera =

Spanish painter

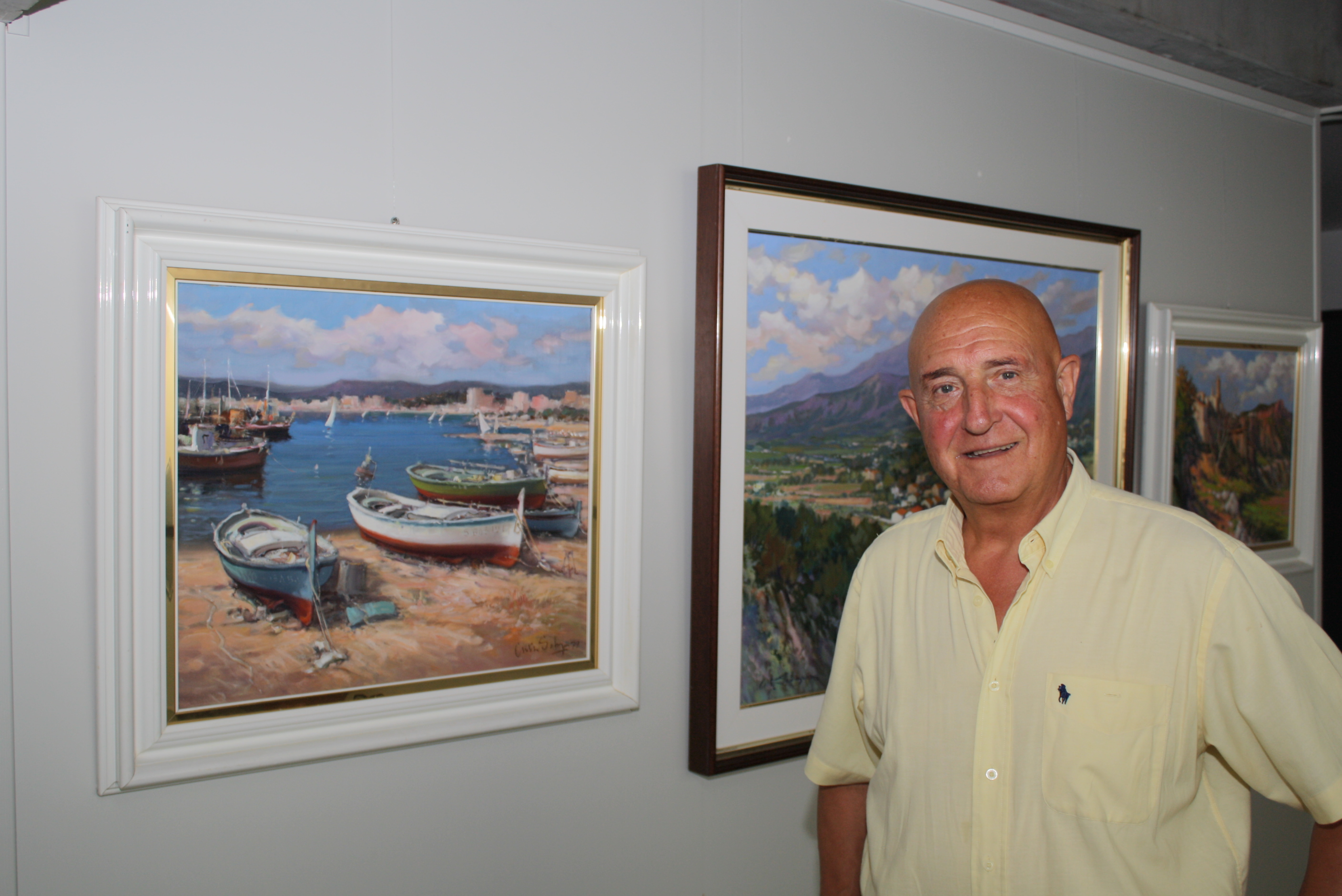
Josep Costa Sobrepera.

Josep Costa Sobrepera (Palafrugell) is a painter of figurative art, mainly watercolors and oil paintings of seascapes, in Palafrugell (Catalonia, Spain), .

== Early life ==
Born to a cork industry family, early on his teachers recognized his artistic talent. Costa Sobrepera took night classes at a local art school and, at 16, got his first job in the workshop of master blacksmith Joan Gich. His first public exhibit was in 1955 at the Palafrugell Library, assisted by his teacher, Lluís Medir Jofra. He continued exhibiting his works locally until 1958, when he began to participate in national and international events, winning some prizes. In the 1960s he was employed by several companies as an engineer and taught evening classes at the School of Arts and Crafts Palafrugell. In 1966 he enrolled at the School of Industrial Engineers of Barcelona.

== Career ==
Until 1971 he lived in Barcelona, where he organized his first studio and enrolled in anatomy classes at the School of Fine Arts, where he met artists like Martinez Lozano. He returned to Palafrugell in 1972 to devote himself entirely to painting. He exhibited his work in several galleries in Catalonia and Spain, including Barcelona's Sala Rovira, and won awards in various competitions, both national and international. In 1975 he married and continued to exhibit widely.

In the 1990s, he quit oil painting to devote himself to watercolors. Costa Sobrepera continued winning awards, especially in France.

== Selected works ==
- Ecstasy. The hopes of a desire (1953)
- Women (India, 1998)
- Home (India 1998)
- Market (Guatemala, 1987)
- Market Street (Guatemala, 1987)
- Morning Light (Palamós, 1999)
- Boats (La Selva, 2004)
- The veil of light (Sweden, 1997)

== Exhibits ==
Year	Space	City	Description
1955	Library Palafrugell	Palafrugell	Exhibition of watercolors
1956	Library Palafrugell	Palafrugell	Exhibition of watercolors
1957	Savings Bank of the Province of Girona	Palafrugell	Solo exhibition of oil paintings
1958	Savings Bank of the Province of Girona	Palafrugell	Solo exhibition of oil paintings
1958	City Hall	Figueres	Exhibition of watercolors
1973	Sala Rovira	Barcelona	Exhibition
1974	Art Room Empordà	Palafrugell	Solo exhibition of oil paintings and watercolors
1975	Art Room Empordà	Palafrugell	Exhibition of watercolors individual and collective
1975	Art Room and Colour	Vic	Exhibition of watercolors
1975	The Vaults	Olot	Exhibition of watercolors
1976	Art Room Empordà	Palafrugell	Exhibitions individual and collective
1976	Caixa Girona	Palafrugell	Exhibition
1976	Art Room and Colour	Vic	Exhibition
1976	Gallery Tramontana	Barcelona	Exhibition
1976	Pension Girona	Palafrugell	Exhibition
1976	Art Galleries Tramontana	Palamos	Exhibition
1977	Llorens Room	Barcelona	Exhibition
1977	Art Room Armengol	Olot	Exhibition
1978	Art Room Empordà	Palafrugell	Exhibition
1979	Gallery Rhodes	Figueres	Exhibition
1979	Llorens Room	Barcelona	Exhibition
1980	Gallery Bonanova	Barcelona	Exhibition
1980	Art Galleries Tramontana	Barcelona	Exhibition
1980	Art Room Empordà	Palafrugell	Exhibition
1981	Art Room Empordà	Palafrugell	Exhibition
1981	Art Room Empordà	Palafrugell	81 Christmas Exhibition
1982	Art Gallery Joseph Buckwheat	Figueres	Solo exhibition of oil paintings
1982	Art Room Empordà	Palafrugell	Solo exhibition of oil paintings
1982	Studio Villa Clara	La Bisbal	Solo exhibition of oil paintings
1982	House of Culture Josep Pla	Palafrugell	Exhibition
1983		Mirapeis	Exhibition
1983	Art Room Empordà	Palafrugell	Solo exhibition of oil paintings
1984	Art Room Empordà	Palafrugell	Solo exhibition of oil paintings
1984	Art Galleries The Cloister	Girona	Exhibition
1986	Gallery Forum	Girona	Exhibition
1986		Madrid	Exhibition in conjunction with the American Chamber of Commerce in Spain
1987	Art Gallery Mayte Muñoz	Barcelona and Madrid	Exhibition
1987	Art Room Gabernia	Valencia	Exhibition
1987	Gallery Forum	Girona	Exhibition
1988	Art Gallery Intellect	Sabadell	Solo exhibition of oil paintings
1988	Art Room and Colour	Vic	Exhibition
1988	Art Gallery Mayte Muñoz	Barcelona	Exhibition
1988	Chelsea Art Gallery	Manresa	Exhibition
1988	Art Room Empordà	Palafrugell	Exhibition
1988	Art Gallery Petritxol	Barcelona	Exhibition
1989	Art Gallery Mayte Muñoz	Madrid	Exhibition
1989	Art Room Rovira	Sabadell	Exhibition
1989	Art Room Intellect	Sabadell	Exhibition
1990	Watt's Art Gallery	Castellar del Vallès	Exhibition
1990	Art Room Lloveras	Terrassa	Exhibition
1990	Art Gallery The Cloister	Girona	Exhibition
1990	heather Room	Manresa	Exhibition
1991	Art Room Lloveras	Terrace	Exhibition
1991	Art Room El Corte Ingles	Barcelona	Exhibition
1992	Art Room xipella	Manresa	Exhibition
1992	Art Room Rovira	Sabadell	Exhibition
1996	Trondhjems Art Gallery	Norway	Exhibition
1996	Gallery Gunvor	Norway	Exhibition
1997	Gallery E. Hellingsen	Aalesund	Exhibition
1998	Art Room-4	Palafrugell	Exhibition
1999	Trondhjems Art Gallery	Norway	Exhibition
1999	Art Galleries Calella	Calella	Exhibition
2000	Gallery E. Hellingsen	Aalesund	Exhibition
2000	Art Gallery Mayte Muñoz	Barcelona	Exhibition
2000	House of Culture Plum Cove	Clubs	Exhibition
2001	Salon du Val d'Or	France	Exhibition in tribute to the artists disappeared and Spanish Sarquella Ezequiel Torroella
2003	Art Room xipella	Manresa	Solo exhibition of oil paintings
2004	Art Room Goya El Corte Ingles	Madrid	Solo exhibition of oil paintings
2006	Art Gallery Thuiller & Colours	Paris	Exhibition
2007	Municipal Theatre	Palafrugell	Exhibition entitled Sobrepera Coast, the landscape and the retina
2008	Civic Center	Portbou	Exhibition
2011	Ca Plum	Clubs	Exhibition in memory of his wife
2012	Municipal Theatre	Palafrugell	Oil Exhibition (July)

== Work in museums ==
His works are found in museums in Catalonia:

- Museu Arqueològic Comarcal de Banyoles
- Museu de l'Empordà (Figueres)
- Museu del Suro de Palafrugell
