= The Cuixart Foundation =

Non-Profit Organization

The Cuixart Foundation is a private non-profit organization located in Palafrugell. It was founded in 1998 by Modest Cuixart i Tàpies.

The organization was set up to illustrate Cuixart's artistic career and to protect his work. Over time, it became a cultural organization that protects his heritage and promotes contemporary Catalan art at an international level. It gives new artists a platform and organizes activities related to art, culture and teaching to inspire new generations. It seeks to sensitize participating artists and give them the intellectual tools to appreciate modern art and its heritage.

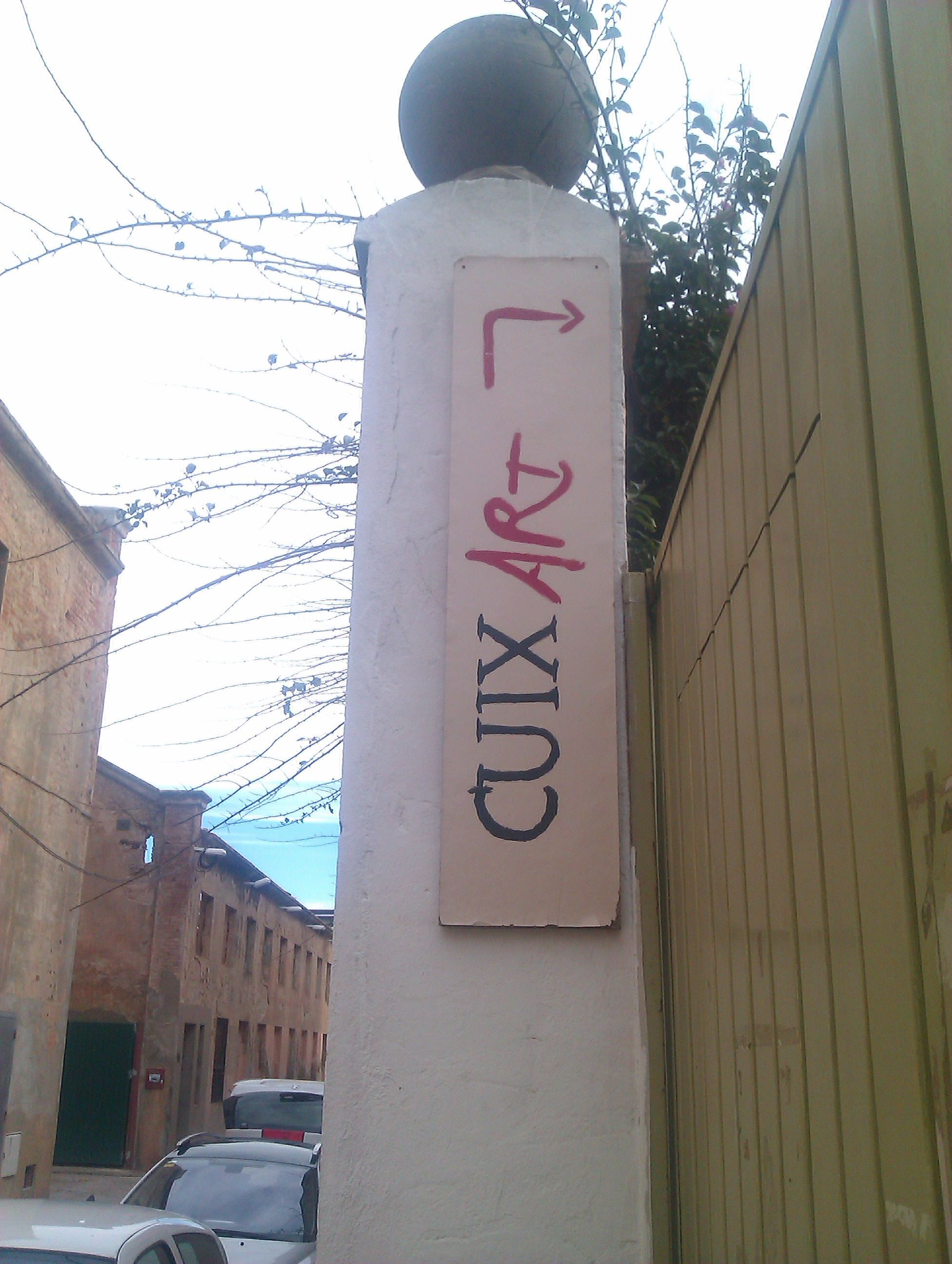
The Cuixart Foundation

In addition, the Cuixart Foundation takes care of the modernist house and workshop where Modest Cuixart lived from the 1970s as part of its cultural heritage.

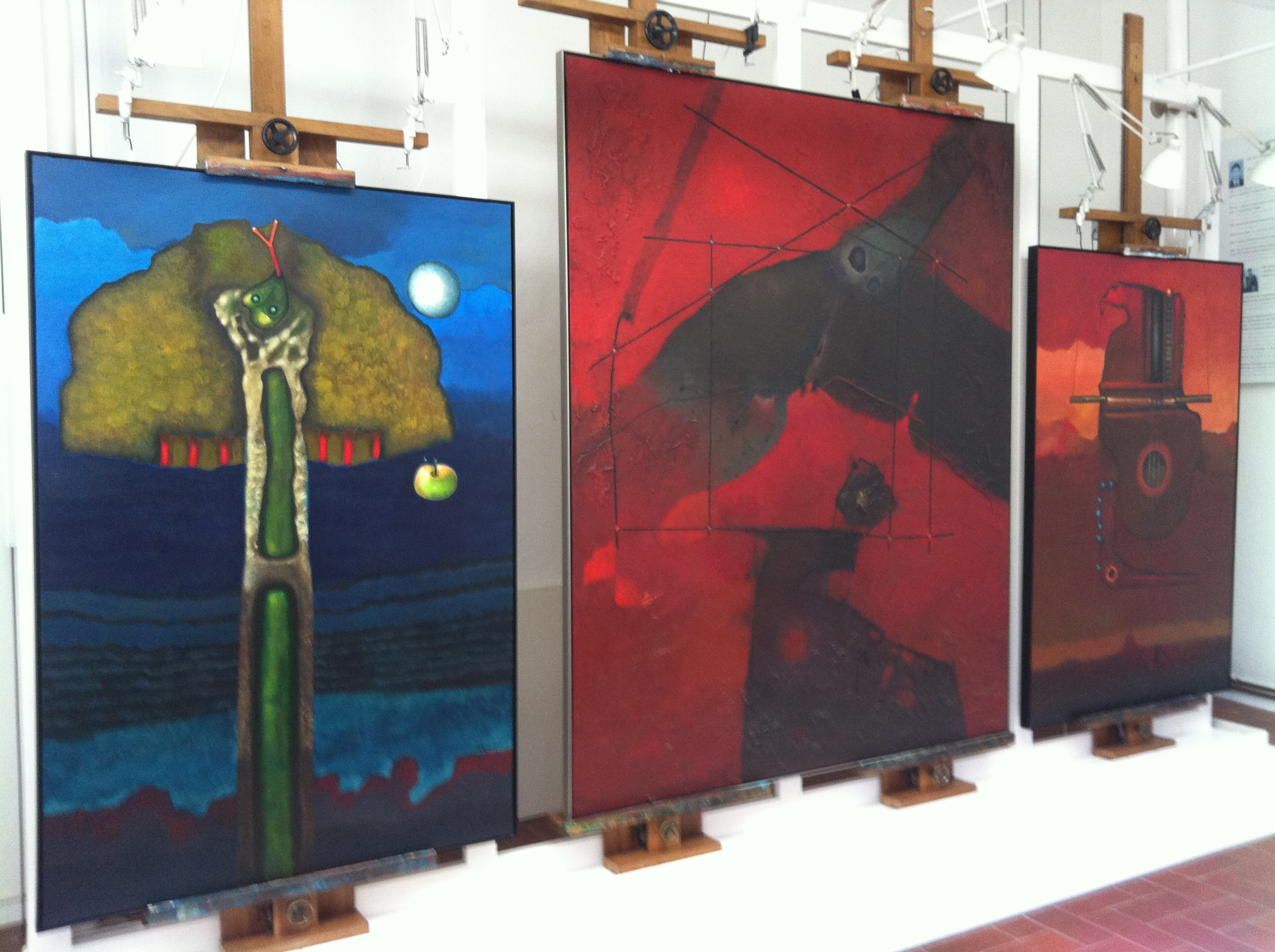
Cuixart Foundation's exhibition

The Foundation works in collaboration with the Department of Culture of the Generalitat de Catalunya and the Town Hall of Palafrugell in different educational and cultural projects.

== Studio ==
The foundation has preserved the painter's studio by maintaining the tools and environment in which Modest Cuixart carried out his creative process.

The workshop, named Taller Victoria, was designed in 1984 by his son, Marc Cuixart, an architect and professor. Cuixart's creative process was intense and he spent days locked inside the workshop. As a result, the attic was adapted into a living and working quarters with a bed for him to rest. The foundation exhibits a selection of works by the artist, especially from the formalist period, when he lived in Paris, and from the last stages of his career.

Modest Cuixart made a total of 4,000 works between 1941 and 2007.
