= Palafrugell =

- Municipality
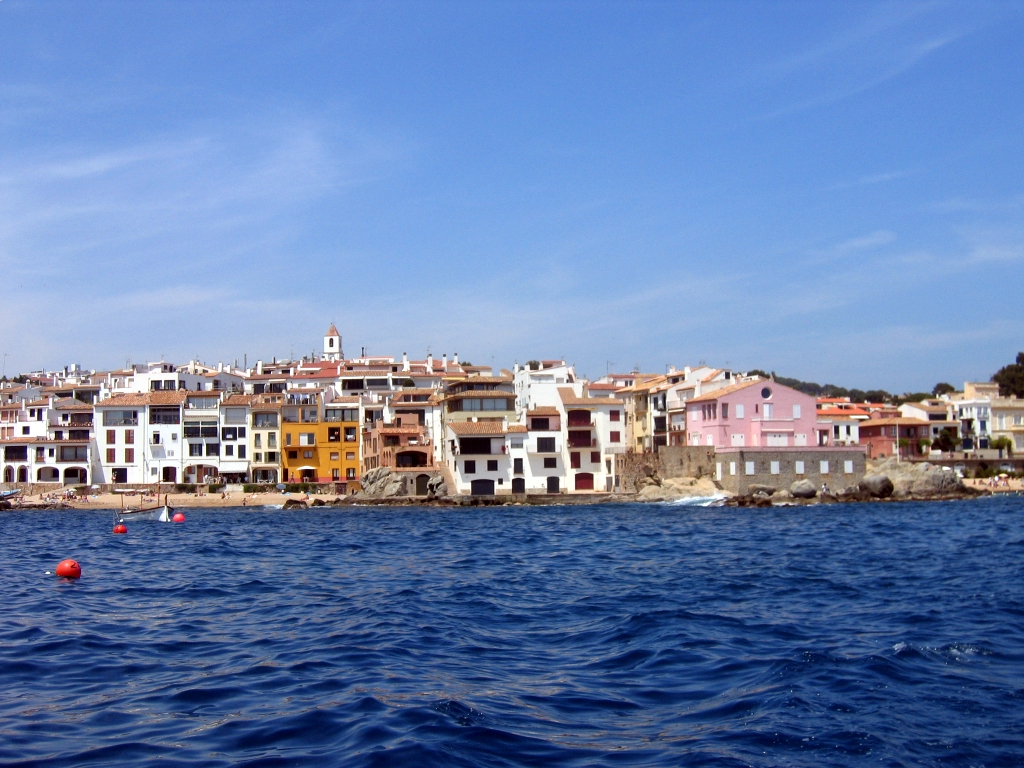

- Flag Coat of arms

- Location in Catalonia Palafrugell (Spain)
- Coordinates: 41°55′9″N 3°9′55″E
- Country: Spain
- Community: Catalonia
- Province: Girona
- Comarca: Baix Empordà

Government
  - Mayor: Josep Piferrer i Puig (2017)

Area
  - Total: 26.9 km^{2} (10.4 sq mi)
- Elevation: 64 m (210 ft)

Population (2025-01-01)
  - Total: 24,543
  - Density: 912/km^{2} (2,360/sq mi)
- Demonym: Palafrugellenc
- Postal code: 17200
- Website: palafrugell.cat

Palafrugell (Catalan: [pələfɾuˈʒeʎ]; Spanish: [palaˈfɾuxel]) is a municipality in the Mediterranean Costa Brava, located near Palamós in the comarca of Baix Empordà, in the province of Girona, Catalonia, Spain. It is the largest city of its comarca, with 22,365 inhabitants. Several coastal and interior towns (Llafranc, Calella de Palafrugell, Tamariu and Llofriu) are frequently grouped with this city.

The area's summer climate and beaches are used mainly for tourism. In additional to international tourism, Palafrugell serves as a summer holiday town for residents of cities such as Barcelona and Girona.

This medieval town was once fortified but is no longer. Many narrow streets emanate from Plaça Nova - a large square with bars, restaurants and boutiques. The local government (Ajuntament) sponsors activities such as concerts and dances including the traditional Sardana. St. Martí's church was built in the late 11th century and is close to Plaça Nova.

There is a new bus station belonging to Grup SARBUS whose local division is known as Sarfa. The station has a regular bus service, servicing the Costa Brava region (including Llafranc, Calella de Palafrugell, and Tamariu) as well as Barcelona.

Palafrugell was reputed for its cork manufacturing in the 18th and 19th centuries. The largest factory was owned by the American company Armstrong and employed hundreds of locals. Its closing in the 1970s led to severe unemployment. The factory's tower still stands, and there is now a small museum commemorating the cork industry just below it.

Palafrugell was served by the 750 mm (2 ft 5 1/2 in) gauge Palamós–Girona–Banyoles railway, which reached a junction with the Barcelona–Cerbère railway at Flaçà by 1887 and was extended to Girona by 1921. Service on the line continued until 1956.

== Geography ==
Besides the town of Palafrugell itself, the municipality includes the following populated places:

- El Bruguerol
- Calella de Palafrugell
- Ermedàs
- Llafranc
- Llofriu
- Santa Margarida
- Tamariu

== See also ==
- Josep Costa Sobrepera
- Rosa Laviña
- Centre Fraternal
- The Cork Museum, which centres on the history, heritage and the lands linked to the Catalan cork industry.
- The Josep Pla Foundation, a literary heritage centre which aims to promote the reading and study of the literary and journalistic work of the Palafrugell author.
- The Cuixart Foundation, which aims to support established or emerging art and artists.
- Can Mario Museum, a contemporary sculpture museum of the Vila Casas Foundation which was inaugurated in 2004.
- Sa Perola Interpretation Centre, located in the net dyeing house of the Fishermen's Guild of Sant Pere, this today is a tourist office and an interpretation centre for the Fishermen's Guild of Calella and the seafaring heritage of the area.
- Sant Sebastià de la Guarda, a monument located in the town of Llafranc (Baix Empordà region). The site consists of an Iberian archeological site from the 6th-1st centuries B.C., a 15th-century watchtower and a 19th-century lighthouse on top of a small mountain.
