= Castell de Sant Esteve de Mar =

Cultural property in Palamós, Spain

- Near Palamós, Province of Girona in Spain
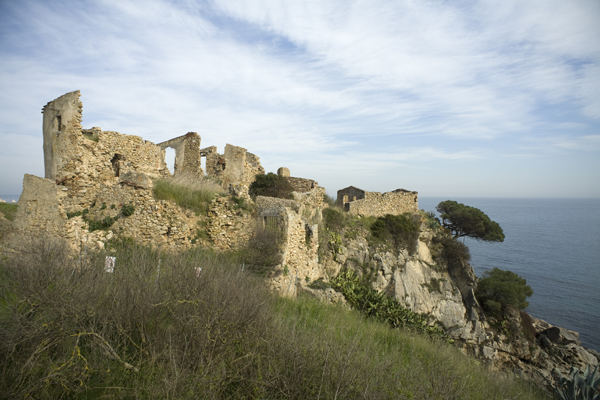
- The castle of Sant Esteve

Site information
- Open to the public: No
- Condition: Ruins

Location
- Coordinates: 41.8583°N 3.1475°E

The Castell de Sant Esteve de Mar is a ruined castle perched atop a cliff in the town of Palamós, in Baix Empordà, between La Fosca and the Cala s'Alguer. Only the bases of some towers and some walls remain, and is currently surrounded by a fence that prevents access to visitors. It is accessed from the path leading from the beach of Fosca to S'Alguer that forms part of the GR 92 long distance footpath.

== History ==
Finds of pottery from the Roman period have been documented on the existing land next to the castle, together with remains of walls and pavements of opus signinum, which are believed to be part of a Roman villa. These remains indicate that the promontory of Sant Esteve was inhabited since Roman times, and was probably a settlement of the Iberian people before that.

Although the construction of the castle seems to date from the twelfth century, the first written reference is from the thirteenth century. Peter II of Barcelona (also known as Peter III of Aragon) had identified the need for a port to shelter his royal fleet on the coast between Barcelona and the border with France. In 1277, he bought the castle and its estate, with the intention of founding the town and royal port of Palamós. With the construction of the new town and port, the castle lost importance and by the 14th century it became the private property of a farmer. In the deed, the name of the estate of the castle of Sant Esteve is changed to that of the estate of Palamós.

The castle was later used for maritime surveillance, as part of a defensive system established against piracy and privateers. In 1567 it was used as a gunpowder store with a small body of guards. Maritime surveillance was maintained throughout the 18th century, but in that century a farmhouse was built on top of the castle, taking advantage of its materials and structures.

The farmhouse was inhabited until the end of the 19th century. Around 1930, the Georgian prince Alexis Mdivani bought the castle with the intention of restoring it, but his death prevented this. The property now belongs to Palamós City Council. The ruins have been consolidated as part of a program sponsored by la Caixa.
