= Rosa Laviña =

Catalan anarchist activist (1918–2011)

- Laviña in 1937
- Born: Rosa Laviña i Carreras; 14 January 1918; Palafrugell, Girona, Catalonia, Spain
- Died: 30 May 2011 (aged 93); Toulouse, Occitanie, France
- Occupations: Seamstress, restaurateur
- Organization(s): Juventudes Libertarias; Confederación Nacional del Trabajo; Solidaridad Internacional Antifascista; Movimiento Libertario Español
- Movement: Anarchism in Spain

Rosa Laviña i Carreras (14 January 1918 – 30 May 2011) was a Catalan anarchist activist. Exposed to anarchist ideas from a young age, she became a leading member in the Libertarian Youth (FIJL) and in Solidaridad Internacional Antifascista (SIA). After the defeat of the Republicans in the Spanish Civil War, she fled to the Occitan city of Toulouse, where she used her house to host members of the Spanish Maquis. She also opened a vegetarian restaurant in the city, where she spent the rest of her life, remaining engaged in anarchist activism into old age.

== Biography ==
Rosa Laviña i Carreras was born on 14 January 1918, in the Catalan city of Palafrugell. She was the daughter of an anarchist bookstore owner, who introduced her from an early age to the anarchist works of Mikhail Bakunin, Joan Montseny and Teresa Mañé. During the dictatorship of Primo de Rivera, she also became involved in the Esperanto movement through friends of her parents. By the time she reached adolescence, she was already working as a seamstress.

After the proclamation of the Second Spanish Republic, she joined the Libertarian Youth (FIJL) and the Confederación Nacional del Trabajo (CNT). During the Spanish Civil War, she acted as the secretary of the FIJL and as treasurer of Solidaridad Internacional Antifascista (SIA). With the fall of Catalonia in February 1939, Laviña and her mother fled the country to France and were interned in the Argelers concentration camp, where Laviña worked as a nurse.

In 1940, Laviña and her mother moved to the Occitan city of Toulouse, where she rendezvoused with other exiled anarcho-syndicalists and anti-fascists, becoming friends with Federica Montseny. She used her house to host members of the Spanish Maquis, including Ramon Vila, Marcel·lí Massana and the Sabaté brothers. Laviña smuggled propaganda, weapons and money into Spain. After the death of her partner Pere in 1952, she continued working with the SIA and providing aid to refugees from Spain.

Laviña then met Etienne Guillemau, a fellow anarchist and Esperantist, with whom she opened the first vegetarian restaurant in Toulouse. She continued working with SIA and the Spanish Libertarian Movement (MLE) until the fall of the Francoist dictatorship. Even after the Spanish transition to democracy, she continued to live in Toulouse, where she remained engaged in anarchist activism into old age.

On 31 March 2011, a street in Palafrugell was renamed after Rosa Laviña. She died two months later, on 30 May 2011, in her home in Toulouse.

== See also ==
- Anarchism in Spain

== Bibliography ==
- Marin Silvestre, Dolors (12 October 2010). "Rosa Lavinya Carreras". Diccionari Biogràfic de Dones (in Catalan).
- Planas, Xevi (1997). "Rosa Laviña, l'anarquista de Palafrugell" (PDF). Revista de Girona (in Catalan). No. 183. pp. 18–23. ISSN 0211-2663.
- Volney, Àlex (30 March 2009). "Rosa Laviña. La filla del llibreter anarquista". Diari de Balears (in Catalan). ISSN 1578-6447.
- Volney, Àlex (6 April 2009). "Rosa Laviña. La filla del llibreter anarquista (i II)". Diari de Balears (in Catalan). ISSN 1578-6447.
