= Centre Fraternal =

Building in Girona Province, Spain

Coordinates: 41°54′59″N 3°09′53″E

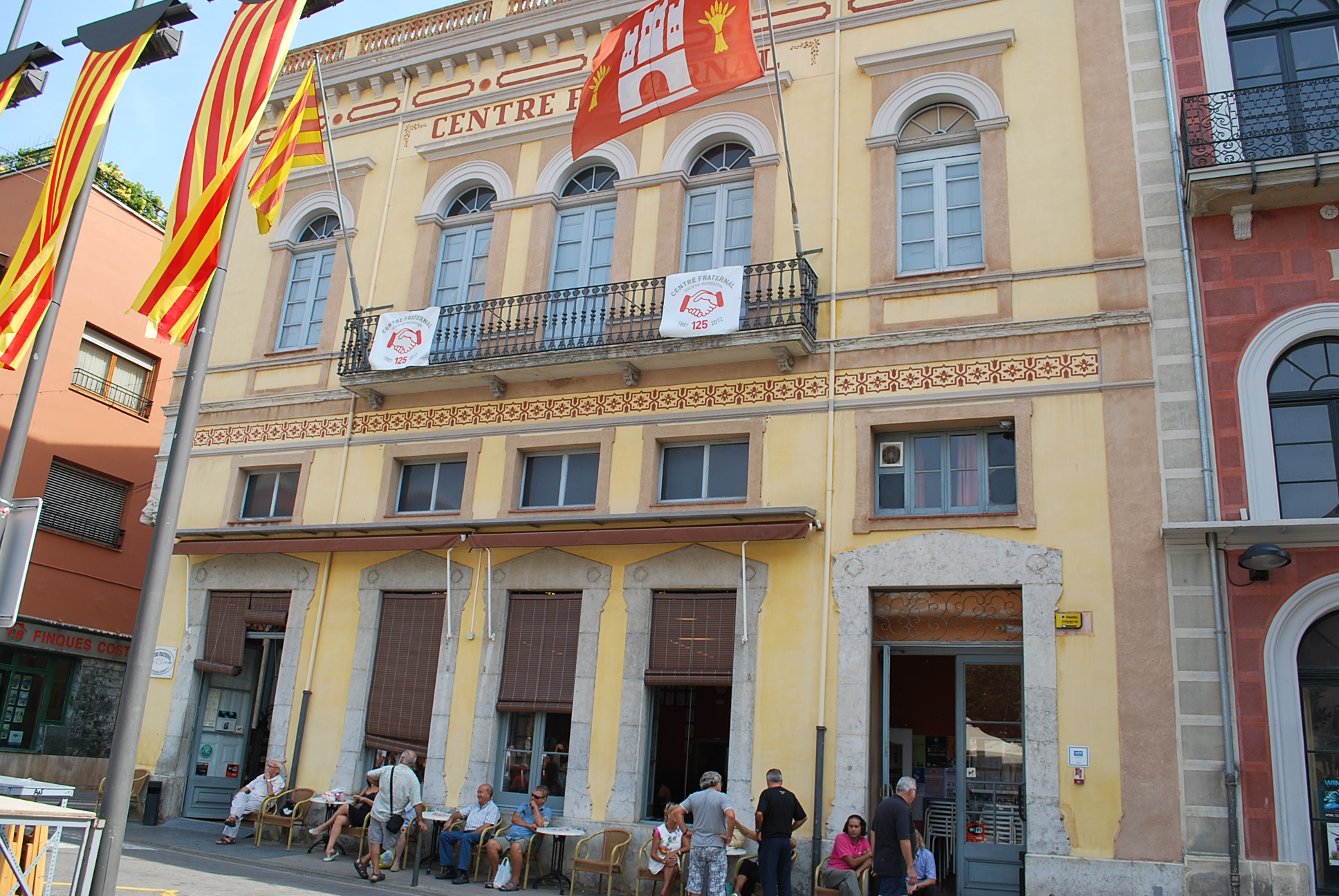
General view

The Centre Fraternal is a casino and cultural center placed in Palafrugell (Baix Empordà) active since 1887. It is placed in a nineteenth-century building which, protected as Local Cultural Interest Heritage building.

== The building ==
It is a large building, ground floor and first floor, the corner from the Plaça Nova and Carrer Sant Sebastià. The main facade is an interesting unit. It has a symmetrical distribution of the openings, the ground floor is rectangular (three central windows and two side doors). At a high level this floor are five other similar types of openings that illuminate the inner room. On the main floor there is a balcony run central three bays of arch supported by corbels decorated and has on each side a window of the same type. The top is supported by corbels cornice with simple railing balusters work with clay. The facade of the Sant Sebastà street typology is similar to the principal. The center still has interesting interior spaces.
