= Josep Pla Foundation =

The Josep Pla Foundation is a literary heritage center that focuses on promoting the reading and study of the literary and journalistic work of Josep Pla. The foundation is located in the writer's hometown, in Palafrugell (Baix Empordà region), where you can see temporary exhibitions and the permanent exhibition "Josep Pla (1897-1981)" that explains his professional career in the historical context of the 19th century.

The Foundation was created in 1973, when the writer decided to give his private library and he created the Josep Pla Library Private Foundation, governed by a Board that deals with its conservation and to facilitate access to the interested public.

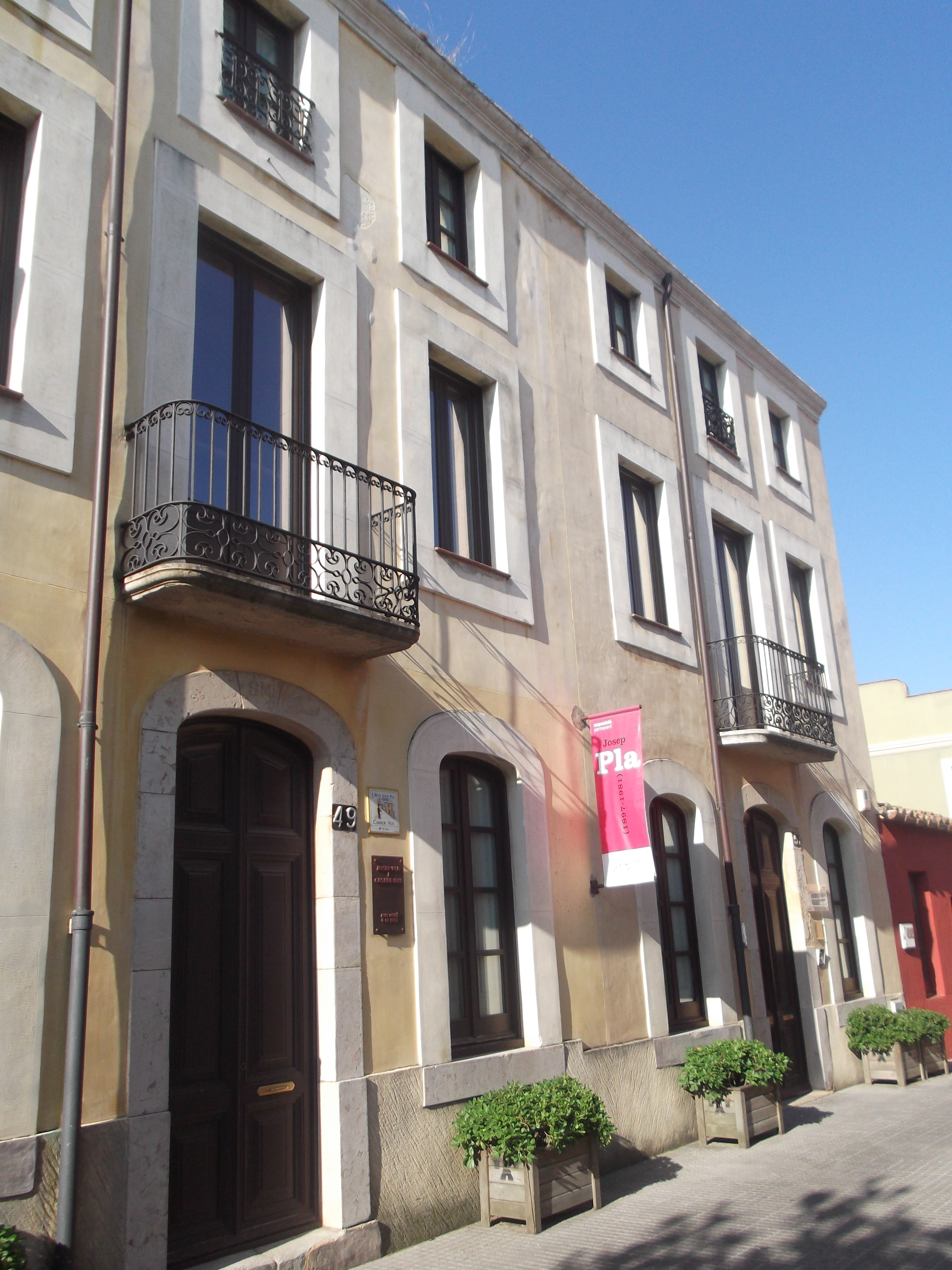
The Josep Pla Foundation

The Josep Pla Foundation is part of the Espais Escritus, an association related with the Catalan literary heritage.

== The building ==
The Josep Pla Foundation is located in the 49 and 51 of Carrer Nou. The first one, is the birthplace of the writer and the one that hosts the permanent exhibition Josep Pla (1897-1981). Josep Pla was born and lived there for seven years while his parents built another house in Torres and Jonama Street. The two houses are twin and were built during the first half of the 1890s. Palafrugell Town Hall acquired and remodeled (with the support of the Generalitat de Catalunya) the no. 51 with the intention of establishing the Josep Pla Foundation and later "la Caixa" bought and remodeled the house no. 49 to expand the headquarters of the entity.

With the remodeling, the new headquarters of the Josep Pla Foundation include, on the ground floor, the reception, the exhibition hall, the public services and the auditorium, on the first floor we find the library and the area of offices, and on the second floor there is the Documentation Center and the temporary exhibition halls.

== History ==
In 1973, Josep Pla donated his private library to the Private Foundation and on July 6 of the same year the Josep Pla Foundation was created. In April 1992, the Generalitat de Catalunya, the Diputació de Girona, the Baix Empordà County Council and the Palafrugell Town Council committed to collaborate financially so that the foundational objectives could be carried out, focused on promoting, motivating and facilitating the reading and study of the literary and journalistic work of Josep Pla. It is from here when the foundation started its activity with the organization of all kinds of activities around the work of the writer in order to expand his knowledge. In the summer of 1993, the Josep Pla Route was presented, designed to know the significant places of the municipality of Palafrugell.

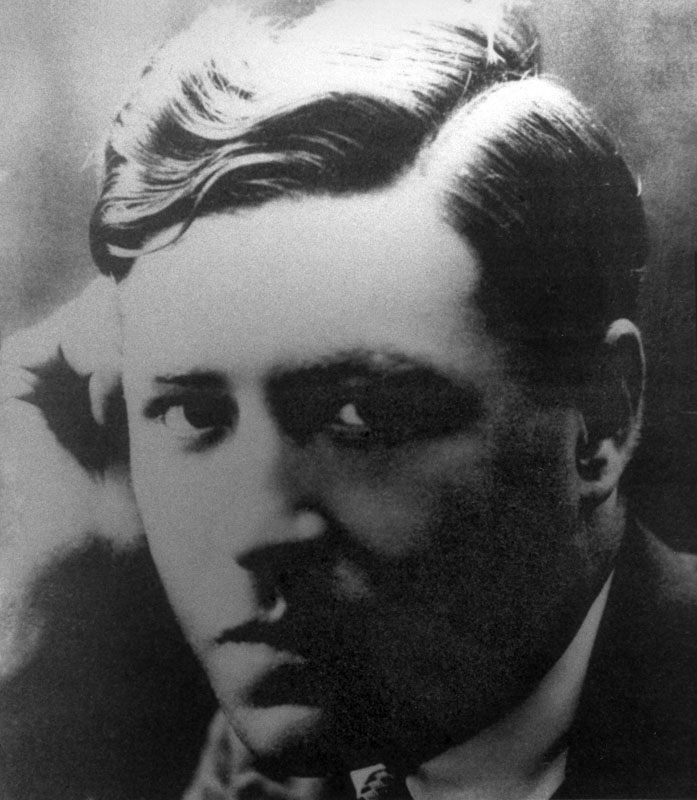
Josep Pla

In 2010, the Cátedra Josep Pla was created thanks to the collaboration between the University of Girona and the Josep Pla Foundation to promote, study and disseminate the figure and work of Josep Pla.

== Services ==
=== Library ===
The Josep Pla Foundation allows the consulting of the library that the writer gave in 1973. It also has a bibliographic background specialized in Josep Pla.

=== Documentation Center ===
The Josep Pla Foundation has a Documentation Center that contains the manuscripts and personal documentation of Josep Pla, an Image Fund, a Media Library and an Art Fund, all related to the life and work of the writer.

=== Educational Service ===
In addition, from its Educational Service, the Fundació Josep Pla aims to support, advise and facilitate the work of teachers in their task of raising the pleasure of reading and making known the classic authors of Catalan literature.

== Activities ==
The Josep Pla Foundation carries out activities to make the literary heritage of the writer know, such as literary routes, exhibitions guides, educational workshops, literary tours or activities that relate landscape, cuisine and literature.
