= Llafranc =

Town in Catalonia, Spain

- Town
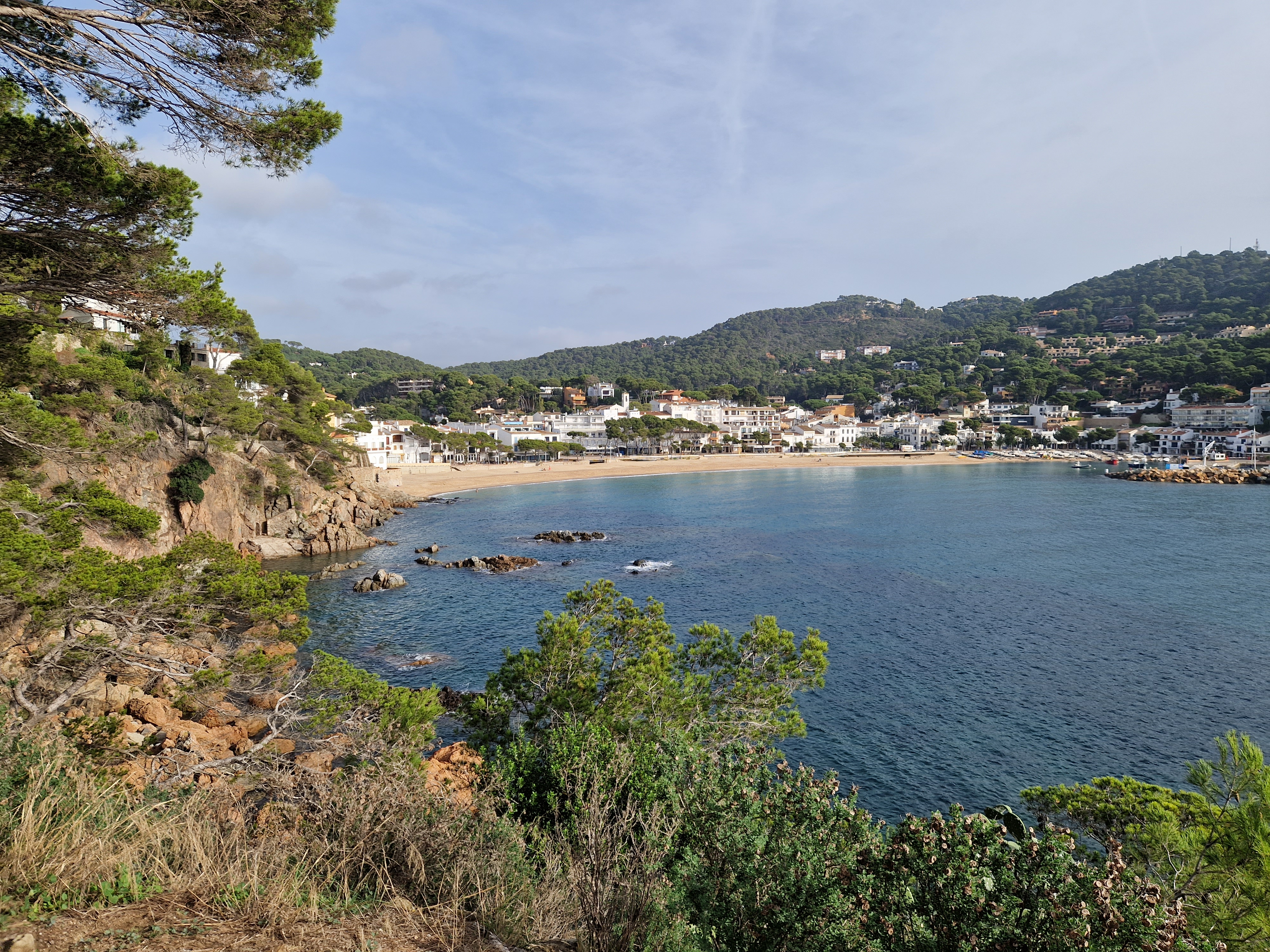
- The town of Llafranc viewed from the headland that separates it from Calella.

- Location within Province of Girona Location within Catalonia Location within Spain
- Coordinates: 41°53′39″N 3°11′37″E
- Country: Spain
- Autonomous community: Catalonia
- Province: Girona
- Comarca: Baix Empordà
- Municipality: Palafrugell

Area
  - Total: 85 km^{2} (33 sq mi)
- Elevation: 26 m (85 ft)
- Time zone: UTC+1 (CET)
  - Summer (DST): UTC+2 (CEST)
- Postal code: 17211

Llafranc (Catalan: [ʎəˈfɾaŋ]; Spanish: [ʎaˈfɾaŋk]) is one of three coastal towns belonging to the municipality of Palafrugell, province of Girona, Spain, the other two being Calella de Palafrugell and Tamariu. It is part of the Costa Brava, the coastal region of northeastern Catalonia, in the comarca of Baix Empordà.

Many domestic tourists come from nearby Barcelona, while the international tourists come from a whole range of countries, especially the Netherlands, England, France, and more recently the United States. The Hotel Llafranc dominates the main sea promenade and was popular with artists such as Rock Hudson, Sophia Loren, Elizabeth Taylor, Salvador Dalí and Ernest Hemingway. The English writer Tom Sharpe was also a resident of Llafranc.

The town is overlooked by the historical site of Sant Sebastià de la Guarda, located on a headland 1.5 kilometres (0.93 mi) to the north, and 168 metres (551 ft) above, Llafranc beach. It comprises the ruins of a settlement of the Iberians from the 6th-1st centuries BCE, a 15th-century watchtower and the 19th century Sant Sebastià lighthouse. The lighthouse, which is still operational, has a range of 32 nautical miles (59 km; 37 mi) and is the most powerful on the Catalan coast. The residential district of El Far, which takes its name from the lighthouse, lies below the headland.

The GR 92 long distance footpath, which runs the length of the Mediterranean coast of Spain, passes through the town. To the north the path follows the road up to the lighthouse and then uses an in places rough, track above the shore line to the beach at Cala Pedrosa and the town of Tamariu. To the south the path follows the coast the short distance to Calella de Palafrugell, passing the 16th century Torre de Calella on the way.

Commerce and civic organizations gather under the Associació d'Amics de Llafranc, which elects a president every 4 years in order to represent this small town in the City Council of Palafrugell, its main municipality.

== The beach ==
Llafranc is one of the most popular beaches in Catalonia, ideal for families and sport enthusiasts. It is the largest beach around in the Palafrugell zone, though small if compared to nearby Pals (Platja Gran) and Palamós (Platja Gran, Castell). At the North end of the beach is the port, home to Club Nàutic Llafranc. At the South end of the beach is rocky land separating Llafranc and Calella.

With a seabed it is welcoming for the visitor, with an aquatic channel following the right end of the beach. This channel follows the Passeig de Ronda, a promenade connecting Llafranc and Calella de Palafrugell with panoramic views.

== Gallery ==
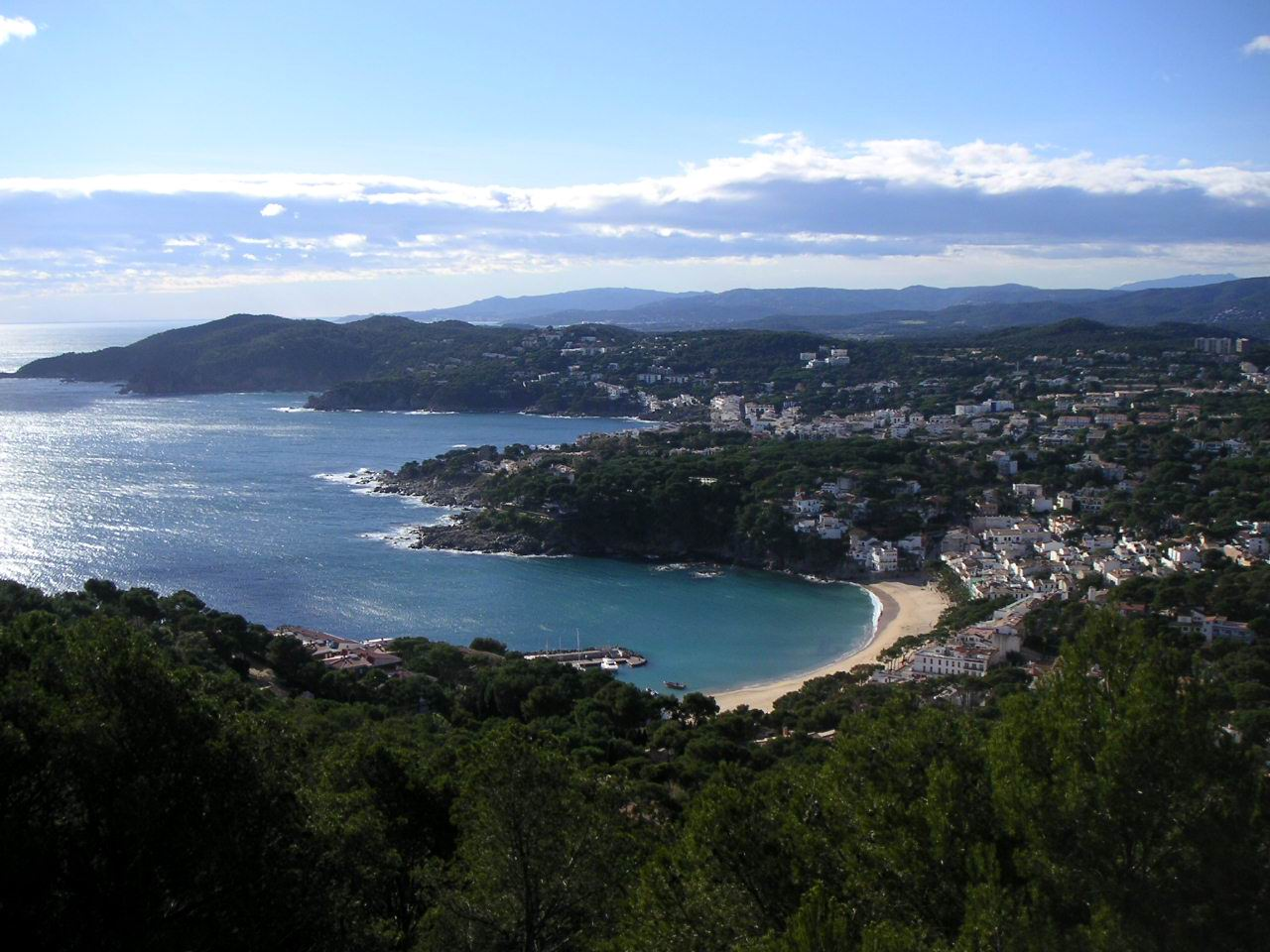
Panoramic view of Llafranc

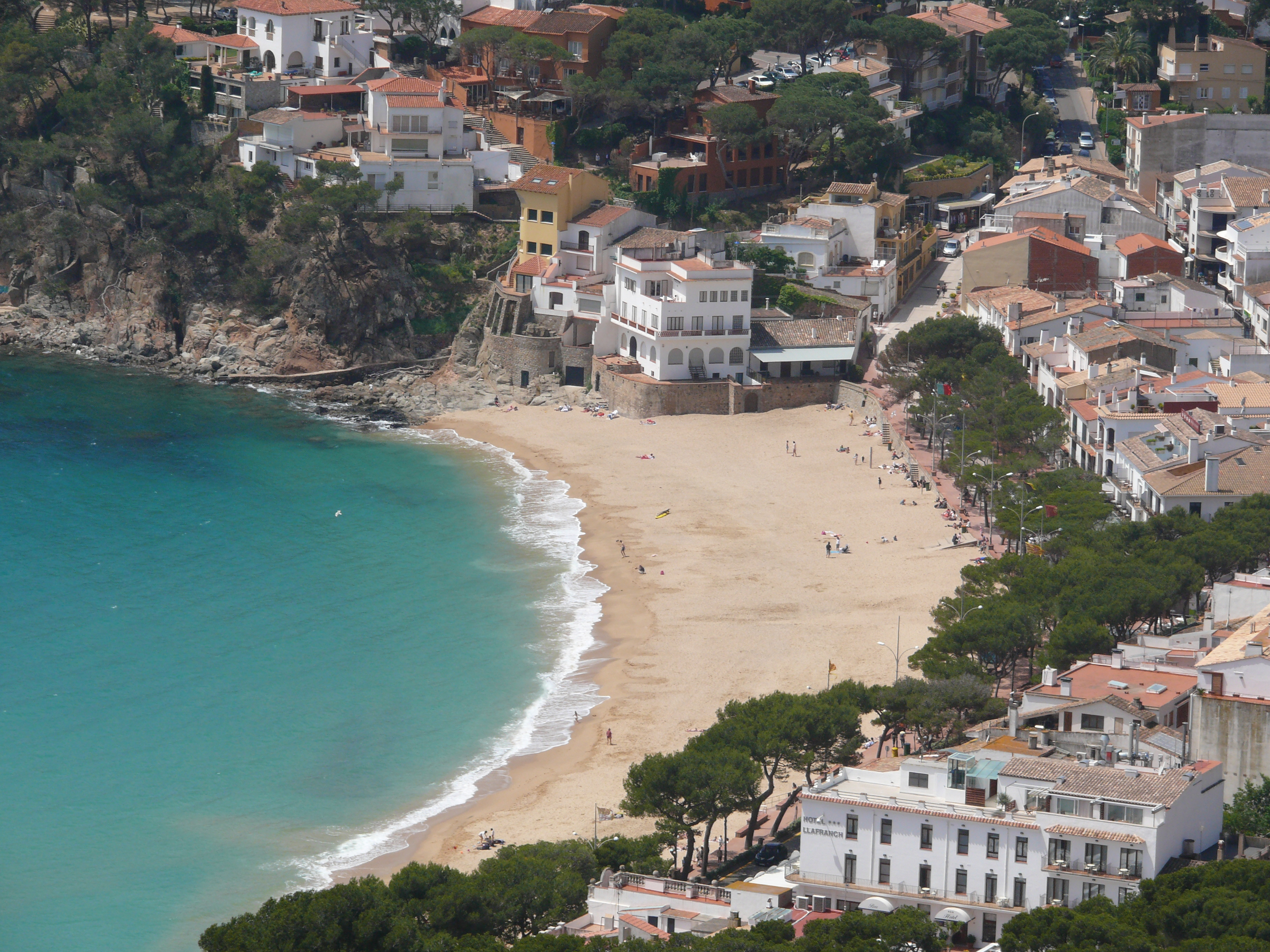
The beach

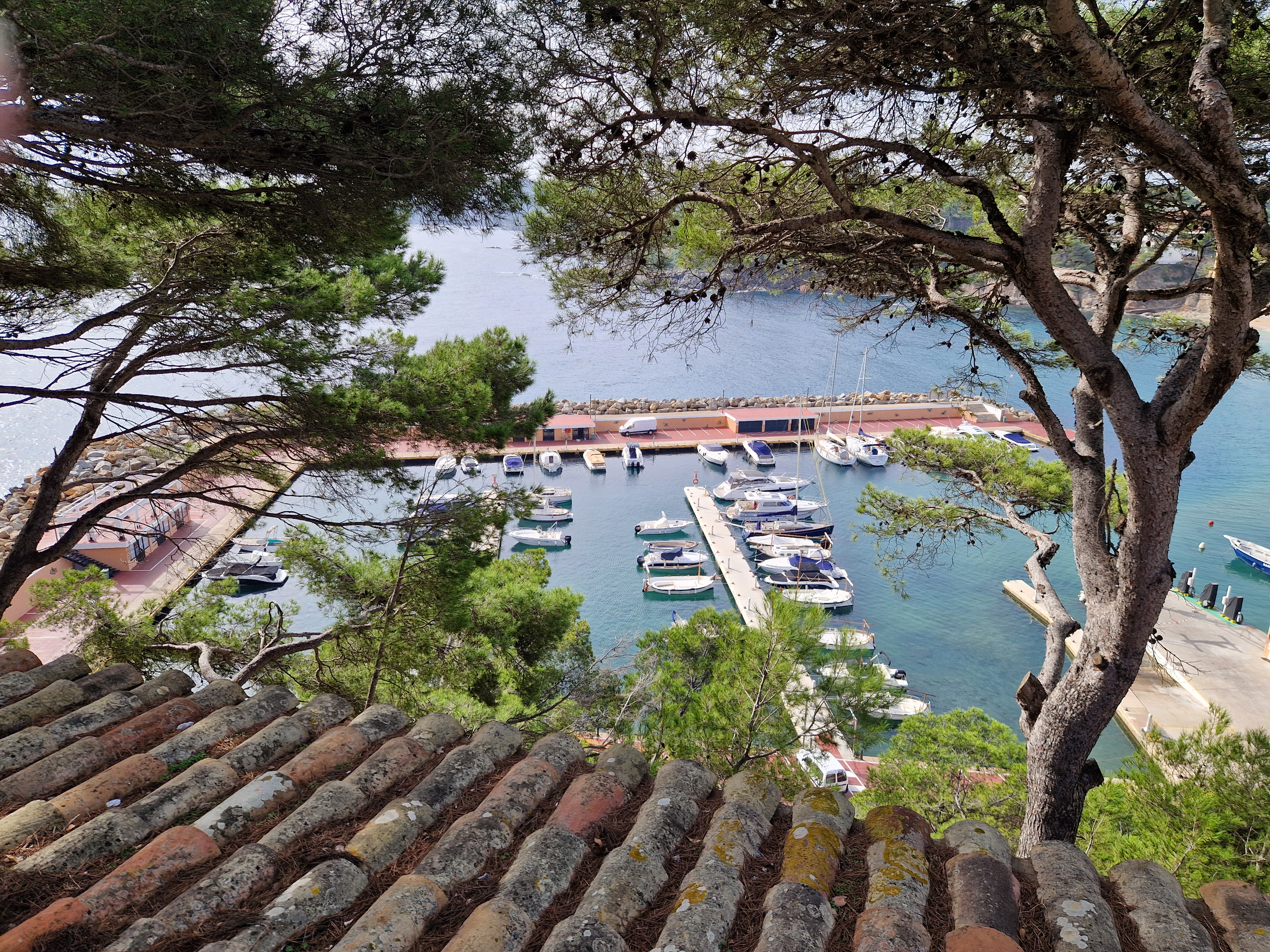
The port
