= Sa Perola Interpretation Centre =

Sa Perola
- Casa de Sa Perola
- Interactive map of the Sa Perola area

General information
- Location: Carrer de les Voltes, Calella de Palafrugell, Baix Empordà, Catalonia, Spain
- Coordinates: 41°53′19.25″N 3°11′4.92″E

Sa Perola is the net dyeing house of the Fisherman's Guild at Saint Piere. It is located in Carrer de les Voltes de Calella de Palafrugell (Baix Empordà region). Documentation of the dyeing centre was preserved by the same producer until his entrance to the Municipal File of Palafrugell.

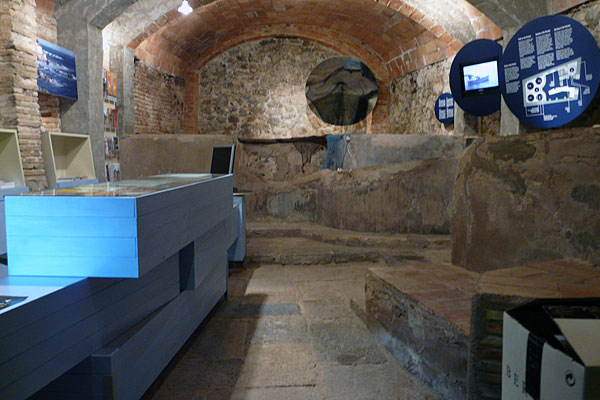
Sa Perola Interpretation Centre

Currently, it serves as a tourist office and interpretation center for the fishing industry in Calella and the maritime heritage of the district as a whole. Sa Perola has become a historical landmark for the town of Calella de Palafrugell and is noteworthy in ethnological, social and cultural terms. Its relevance extends beyond the municipality of Palafrugell, due to the destruction of most of the net-dyeing houses on the Catalan Coast.

== History ==
The Sa Perola building was most likely built at the end of the 18th century by the Fishermen's Association of Palafrugell. The building's facilities were used to dye cotton networks to ensure their preservation and as a meeting place for fishermen.

The fisherman Joan Bofill i Codina (Calella de Palafrugell, 1816 - 1884) bought the house known as Sa Perola in 1865, when the sailors' union was disbanded. In 1868, he sold it to the Fisherman's Guild to be used communally.

The use of Sa Perola was declining until the 1960s, due to the emergence of nylon, which did not require dye. In 1986, the Fishermen's Association donated the building of Sa Perola to the City of Palafrugell on the condition that it had public use. The ground floor became the tourist office of Calella de Palafrugell. In 2010, the Sa Perola Interpretation Center was inaugurated to promote the maritime and fishing heritage of Palafrugell.

The purpose of the Sa Perola Interpretation Center is to preserve knowledge, information, and artifacts of the marine and fishing trade, including fishermen's houses, huts, and watchtowers. The project has been coordinated and documented by the Municipal Archive of Palafrugell, the Palafrugell Economic Promotion Institute (IPEP), and the Fishing Museum.
