= Tamariu =

- Town
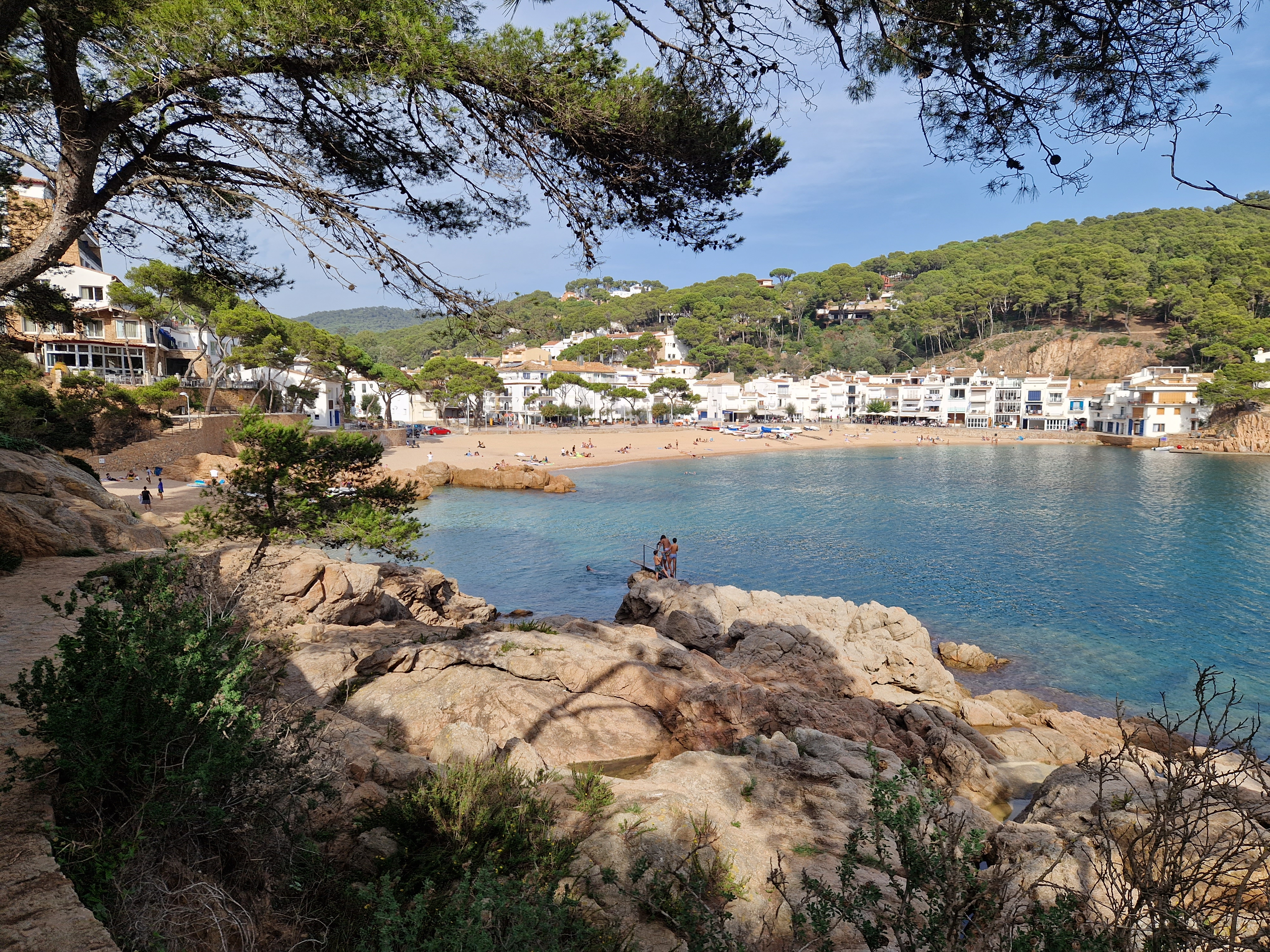
- Tamariu seen from the GR-92 to the south

- Location within Province of Girona Location within Catalonia Location within Spain
- Coordinates: 41°55′12″N 3°12′36″E
- Country: Spain
- Autonomous community: Catalonia
- Province: Girona
- Comarca: Baix Empordà
- Municipality: Palafrugell
- Elevation: 0 m (0 ft)

Tamariu (Catalan pronunciation: [təməˈɾiw], Catalan for tamarisk) is one of three coastal towns belonging to the municipality of Palafrugell, province of Girona, Catalonia, Spain, the other two being Calella de Palafrugell and Llafranc. It is part of the Costa Brava, the coastal region of northeastern Catalonia, in the comarca of Baix Empordà. It is situated about 70 mi (110 km) south of the border with France and close to the nearby inland towns of Palafrugell and Begur.

The name Tamariu derives from the presence of many tamarisk trees along the promenade, which separates the beach from the narrow streets and whitewashed buildings of the town. Tamariu was originally a small fishing village, and fishing boats are still to be seen drawn up on the beach. Today they have been joined by a few hotels, along with seafood restaurants, cafes and bars.

Tamariu is set amongst rugged pine covered cliffs flanking the Mediterranean Sea. The crystal clear waters around this area are amongst the purest on the coast. The south-facing blue flag beach is ideal for swimming as the it shelves at a fairly gentle angle. It is also popular as a dive site as there are many caves to explore along with the submerged mountain of the Llosa de Cala Nova.

The GR 92 long distance footpath, which runs the length of the Mediterranean coast of Spain, passes through the town. To the north the path takes an inland route through pine and cork oak forests to the beach at Aiguablava before following the coast to Fornells. To the south the path follows an, in places rough, track above the shore line to the beach at Cala Pedrosa, the Sant Sebastià lighthouse, and the town of Llafranc.

Aigua Gelida is the largest urbanisation in Tamariu filling the gap between Tamariu and Aiguablava. Aigua Gelida has a small sandy cove predominantly for residents of Cala Nostra just 300m away. Building restrictions are not as strict in Aigua Gelida and so many modern villas have been built in the past few years.

== Gallery ==
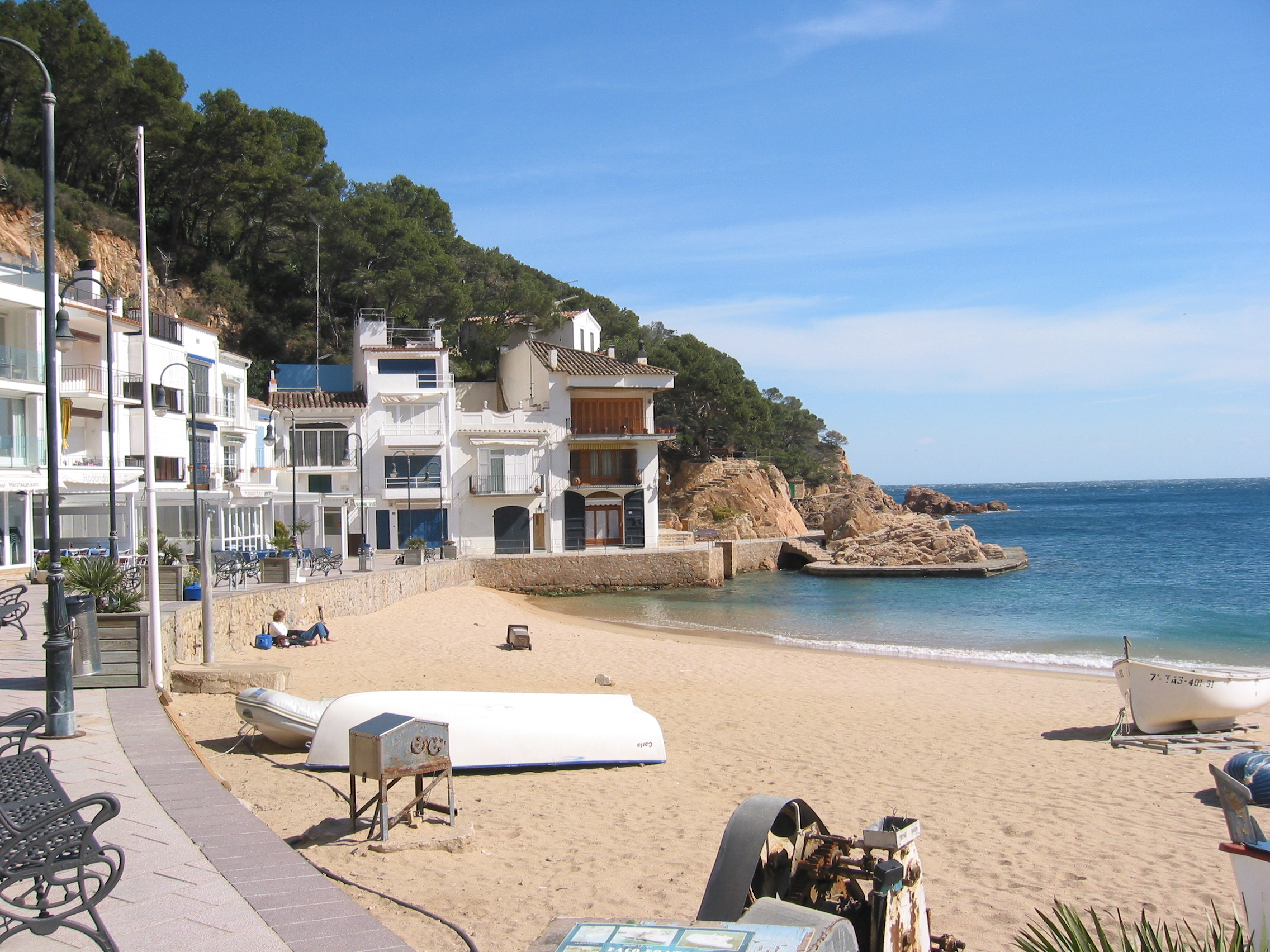
The sea front

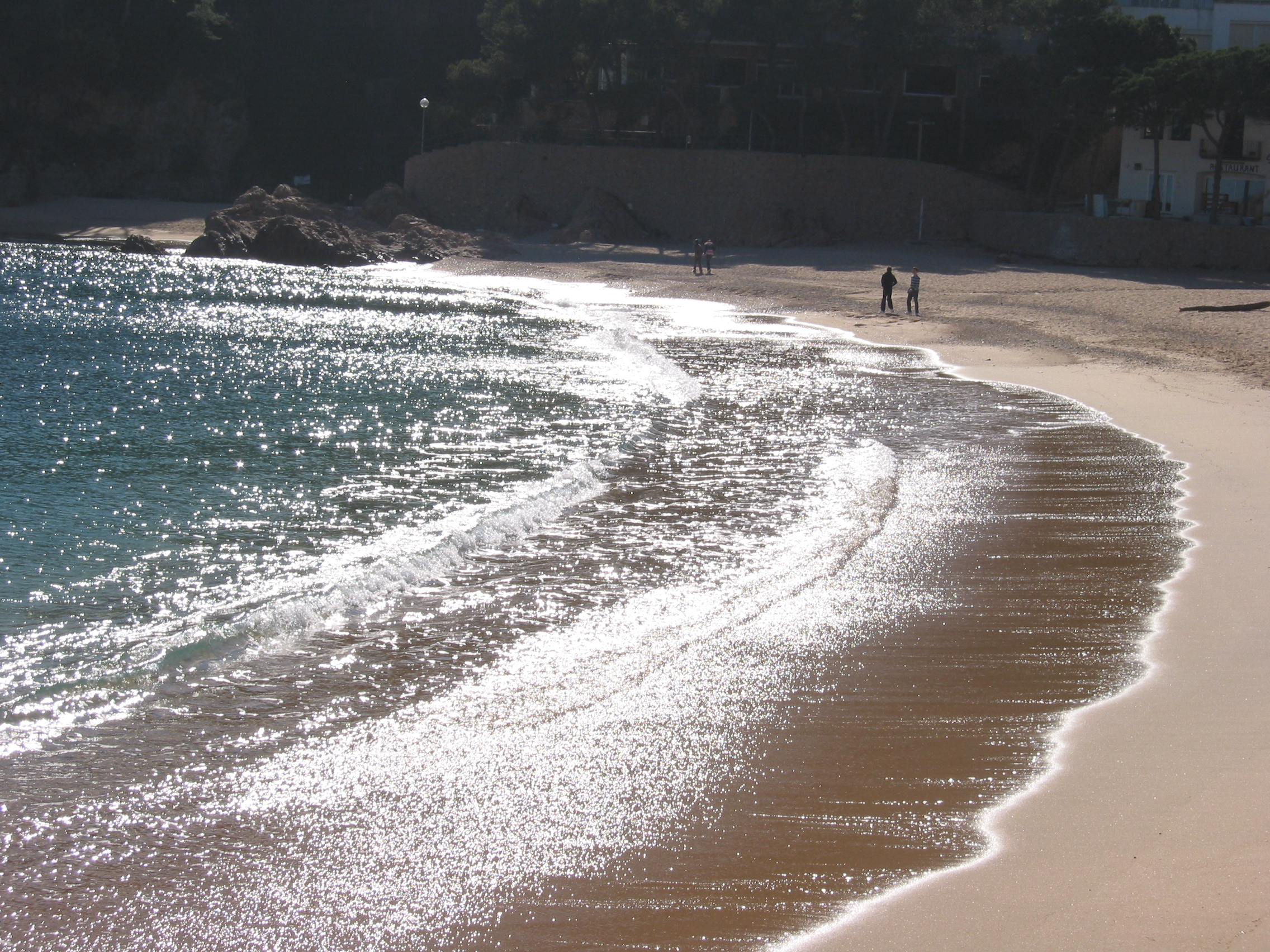
The beach
