= Sant Sebastià de la Guarda =

Coordinates: 41.8971°N 3.2029°E

Sant Sebastià de la Guarda is a historical site located in the town of Llafranc in the Baix Emporda region of Girona province. The site consists of an Iberian archeological site from the 6th-1st centuries B.C., a 15th-century watchtower and a 19th-century lighthouse on top of a small mountain 156m above the sea, which protected the region from pirate attacks and retains many of its original features.

The watchtower allows for panoramic views of the Costa Brava coastline and contains a small museum that details the history of the monument and Llafranc area. The archeological site consists of a small Iberian village which was first discovered between 1958–1960, with excavations taking place between 1984-1987.

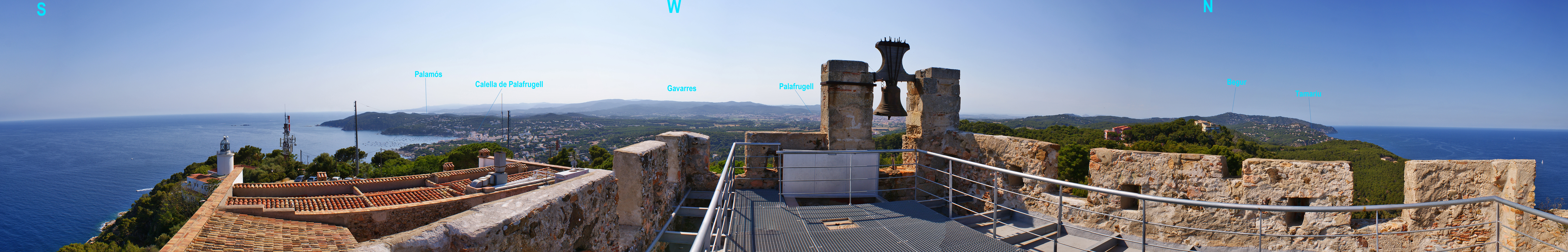
A panoramic photograph of the surrounding coastline from the top of the watchtower.
