= Costa Brava =

Coastal region of Catalonia, Spain

Coordinates: 42.0228°N 3.22449°E

Costa Brava

Typical landscape of Costa Brava that gives its name, "rugged coast" (coastline close to Tossa de Mar)

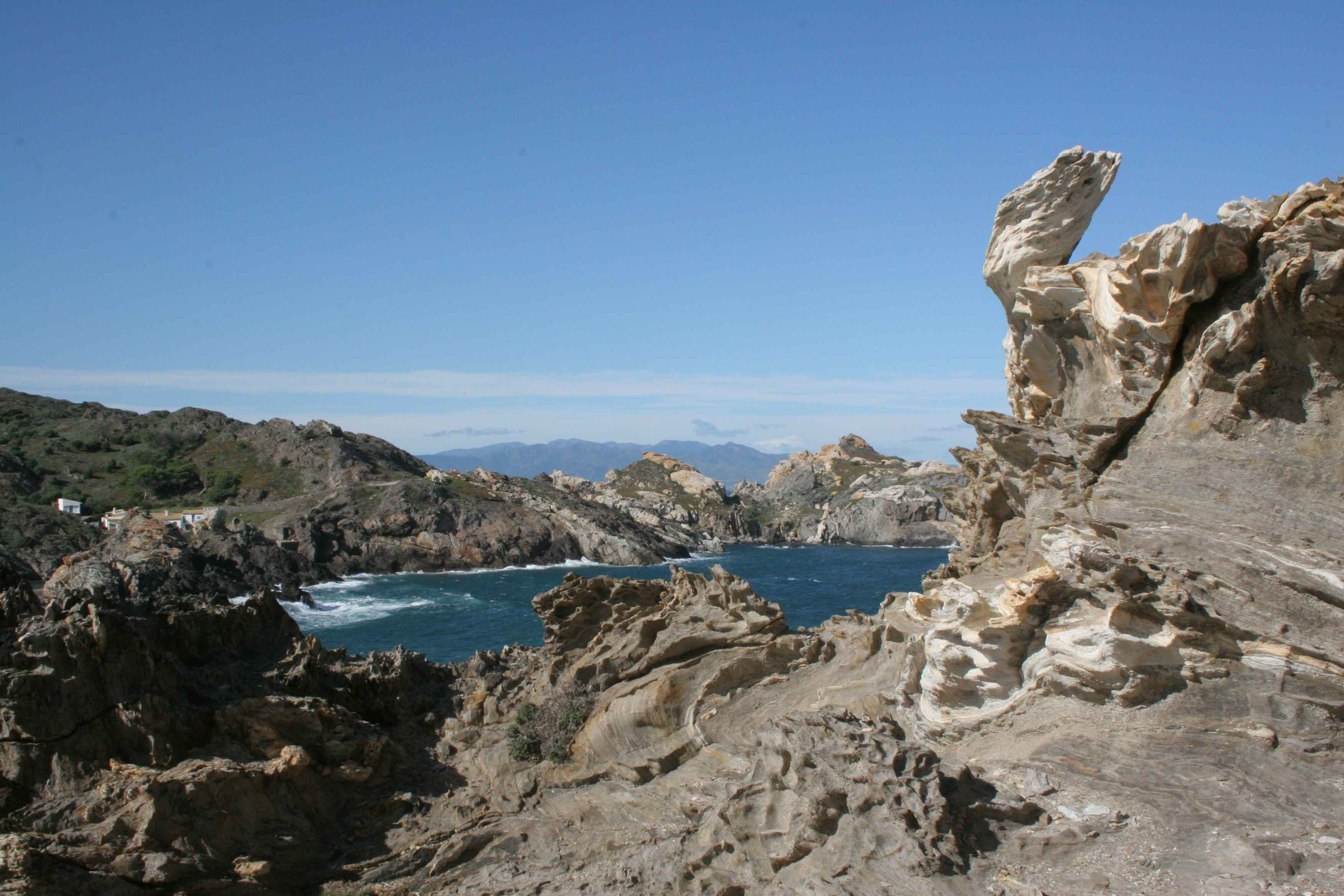
Landscape from Cape Creus in Cadaqués

The Costa Brava (Catalan: [ˈkɔstə ˈβɾaβə]; (Note: In isolation, Brava is pronounced [ˈbɾaβə] in Catalan and [ˈbɾaβa] in Spanish.) Spanish: [ˈkosta ˈβɾaβa]; 'Wild Coast' or 'Rough Coast') is a coastal region of Catalonia in northeastern Spain. Sources differ on the exact definition of the Costa Brava. Usually it can be regarded as stretching from the town of Blanes, 60 km (37 mi) northeast of Barcelona, to the French border – in other words it consists of the coast of the province of Girona.

In the 1950s, the Costa Brava was identified by the Spanish government and local entrepreneurs as being suitable for substantial development as a holiday destination, mainly for package holiday tourists from Europe. The combination of a very good summer climate, nature, excellent beaches and a favourable foreign exchange rate (before the creation of the single European currency), which made the Costa Brava an attractive tourist destination, was exploited by the construction of large numbers of hotels and apartments in such seaside resorts as Blanes, Tossa de Mar and Lloret de Mar. Tourism rapidly took over from fishing as the principal business of the area.

== Etymology ==
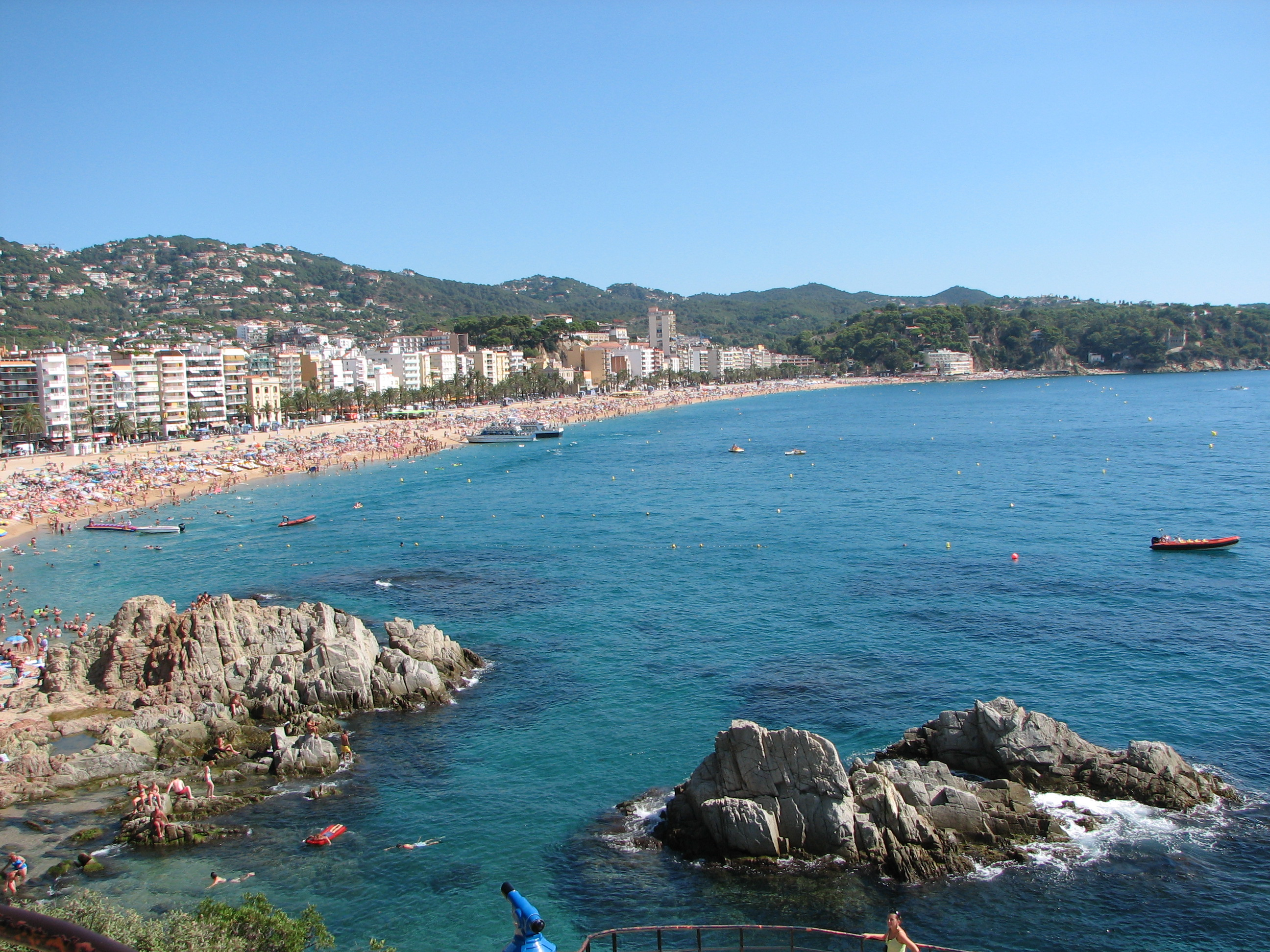
Bay of Lloret de Mar, most important summer resort of Costa Brava

The coast was named Costa Brava by Ferran Agulló i Vidal in an article published in the Catalan newspaper La Veu de Catalunya in September 1908. Agulló, a journalist born in Girona, referred to the rugged landscape of the Mediterranean coast between the Tordera river, near Blanes, and Banyuls (just over the border in France) with the name Costa Brava. Costa is the Catalan and Spanish word for 'coast', while Brava in both languages means 'rugged' or 'wild'. This term was officially recognized and promoted in the 1960s as it was deemed suitable to promote tourism in the region. Before Costa Brava became the official name, other names were suggested, such as Costa Grega (Greek Coast) due to the ancient heritage of this area which includes Greek-Phoenician settlements such as Emporion, Costa del Corall (Coral Coast), Costa Serena (Serene Coast), Costes de Llevant (Levant Coasts) or Marina de l'Empordà (Empordà Marine).

It may or may not be a coincidence that the name Costa Brava resembles Costa Blava (the Catalan designation of the French Riviera), which is a literal translation of the Spanish Costa Azul ("Blue Coast"). This in turn is a not-quite-literal translation of the French Côte d'Azur ("Azure Coast"); azul has the same etymology as azur, but it is the general Spanish term for blue, not specifically azure. A direct translation from French to Catalan would have yielded Costa d'Atzur.

== Geography ==
=== Extent ===
There are several, slightly differing, definitions of the Costa Brava:

- in his article, Ferran Agulló i Vidal introduced the name Costa Brava for the coastline from the River Tordera, near Blanes, to Banyuls-sur-Mer, in France and some 14 kilometres (8.7 mi) beyond the Franco-Spanish border at Portbou.
- the Generalitat de Catalunya defines the Costa Brava as the coastal region that stretches from the mouth of the River Tordera, which marks the border of the provinces of Girona and Barcelona, and the Franco-Spanish border.
- the Costa Brava Girona Tourism Board, a body of the tourism industry of the Province of Girona, promotes the brand name Costa Brava as an area of 5,885 square kilometres (2,272 sq mi). By this definition, Costa Brava includes the coastal comarques of Alt Empordà, Baix Empordà, Selva and the inland comarques of Pla de l'Estany and Gironès.

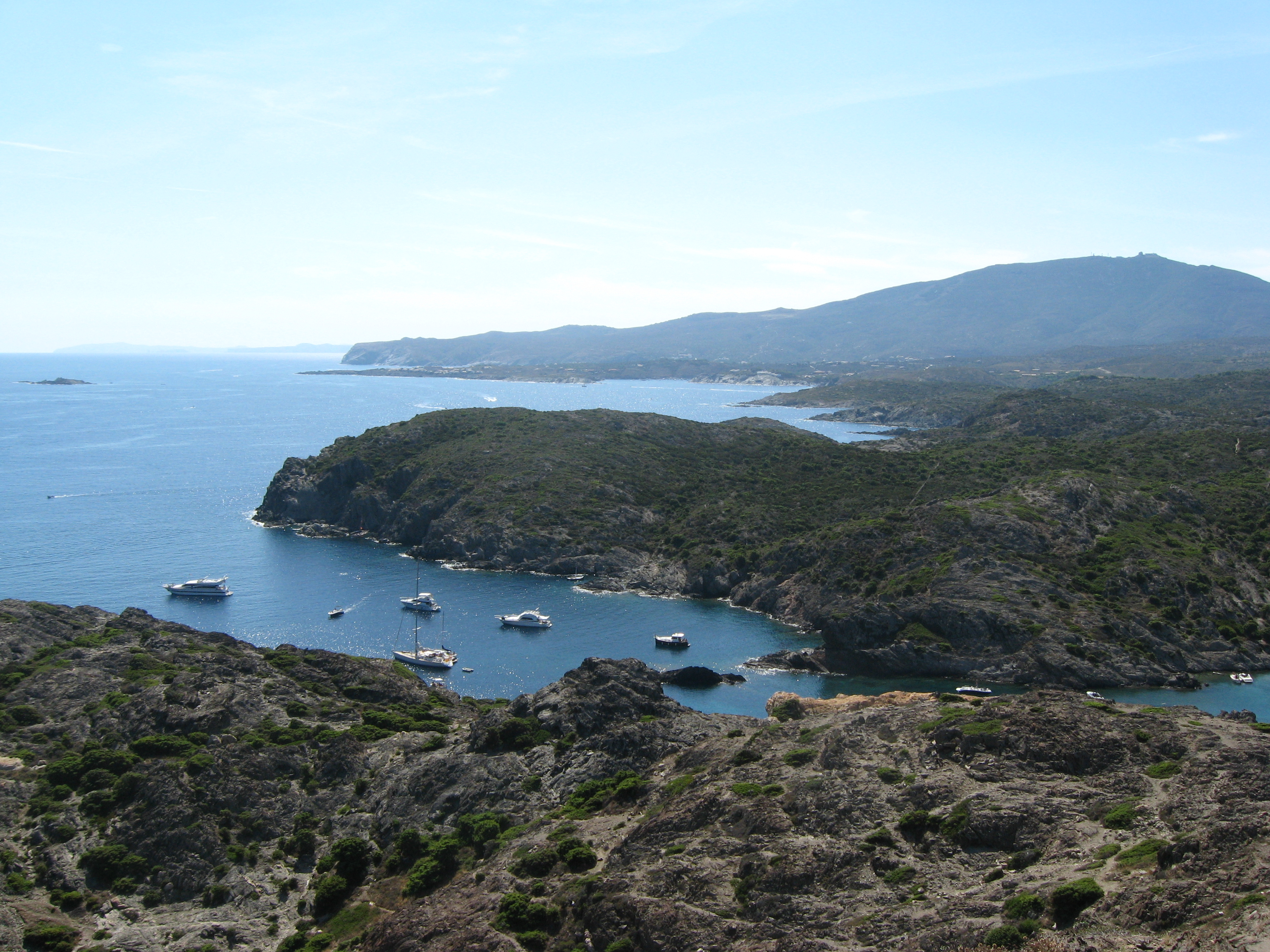
The Cap de Creus is the easternmost point of the Iberian Peninsula.

=== Description ===
The northernmost part of the Costa Brava belongs to the comarca of Alt Empordà, and is marked by the Albera Massif and Cap de Creus, the easternmost prolongation of the Pyrenees. This area near the frontier is marked by rough terrain and cliffs, with small bays along the coast, in contrast with the large plains of the Alt Empordà region, where its capital Figueres is located. The first town from the border with France is Portbou, which grew around the railway station. A little down the coast are the seafaring villages of Colera and Llançà. North of the Cap de Creus lies the town of El Port de la Selva, while on its south lie the towns of Cadaqués and Roses. To the south of the Cap de Creus is found the Gulf of Roses, which stretches for fifteen kilometres with beaches and marshlands formed by the Muga and Fluvià rivers, with the protected areas of the Aiguamolls de l'Empordà along the coast. Empuriabrava, part of the municipality of Castelló d'Empúries, is one of the largest marinas in the world, built in the 1960s on the marshlands of the River Muga. Further south lies the town of Sant Pere Pescador and the coastal town of L'Escala. Between this two towns is the village of Sant Martí d'Empúries, which lies near the ruins of the ancient Greek colony of Empúries, founded in 575 BC.

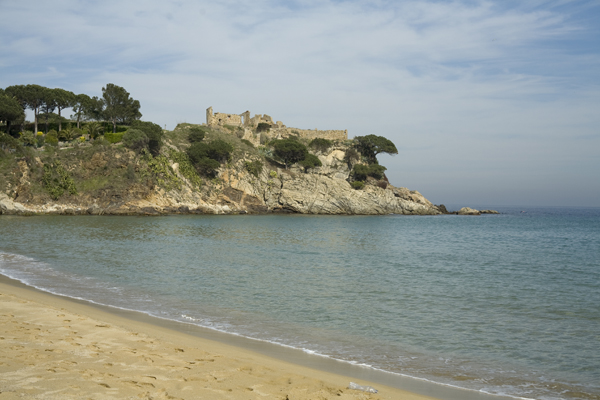
The bay of La Fosca, near Palamós, and the castle that dominates the beach

The central part of the Costa Brava belongs to the comarca of Baix Empordà, whose capital is La Bisbal d'Empordà, with the Montgrí Massif extending on its north, from L'Escala to the village of L'Estartit, part of the municipality of Torroella de Montgrí. The River Ter pours its water at this point, near a small archipelago known as Medes Islands. Further south, following a stretch of beach and marshlands, are the towns of Pals, Begur and Palafrugell. At this point the Gavarres Massif meets the sea, with a coast marked by rugged cliffs, small bays and beaches amid coastal villages such as Aiguafreda, Fornells, Tamariu, Llafranc and Calella de Palafrugell. The town of Palamós, further south, is a major commercial and fishing port. At this point, the coast forms a bay between Palamós and Sant Antoni de Calonge, part of the town of Calonge. South of it lies the town of Castell-Platja d'Aro, including Platja d'Aro, a large tourist resort that has grown along a wide beach. Situated to the south are S'Agaró and the town of Sant Feliu de Guixols, which lies to the north-east of the Ardenya Massif.

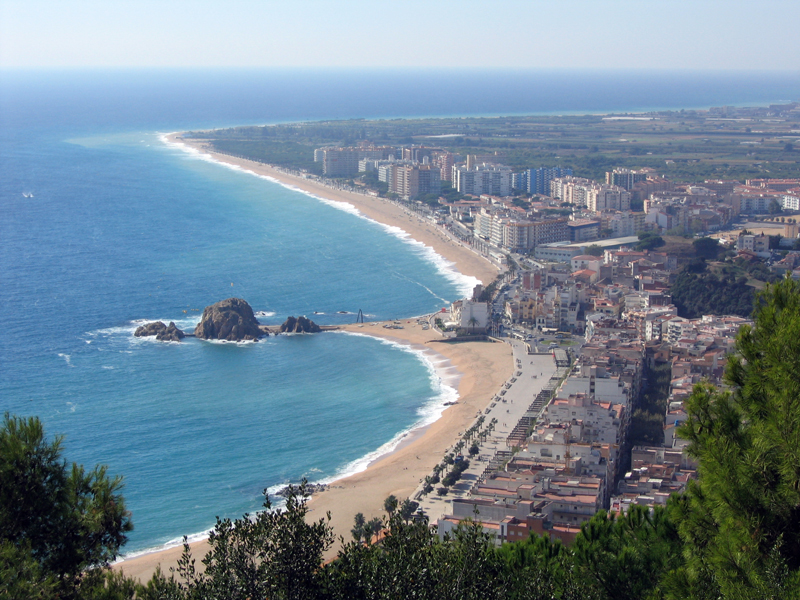
The beach of Blanes and the mouth of the River Tordera in the background

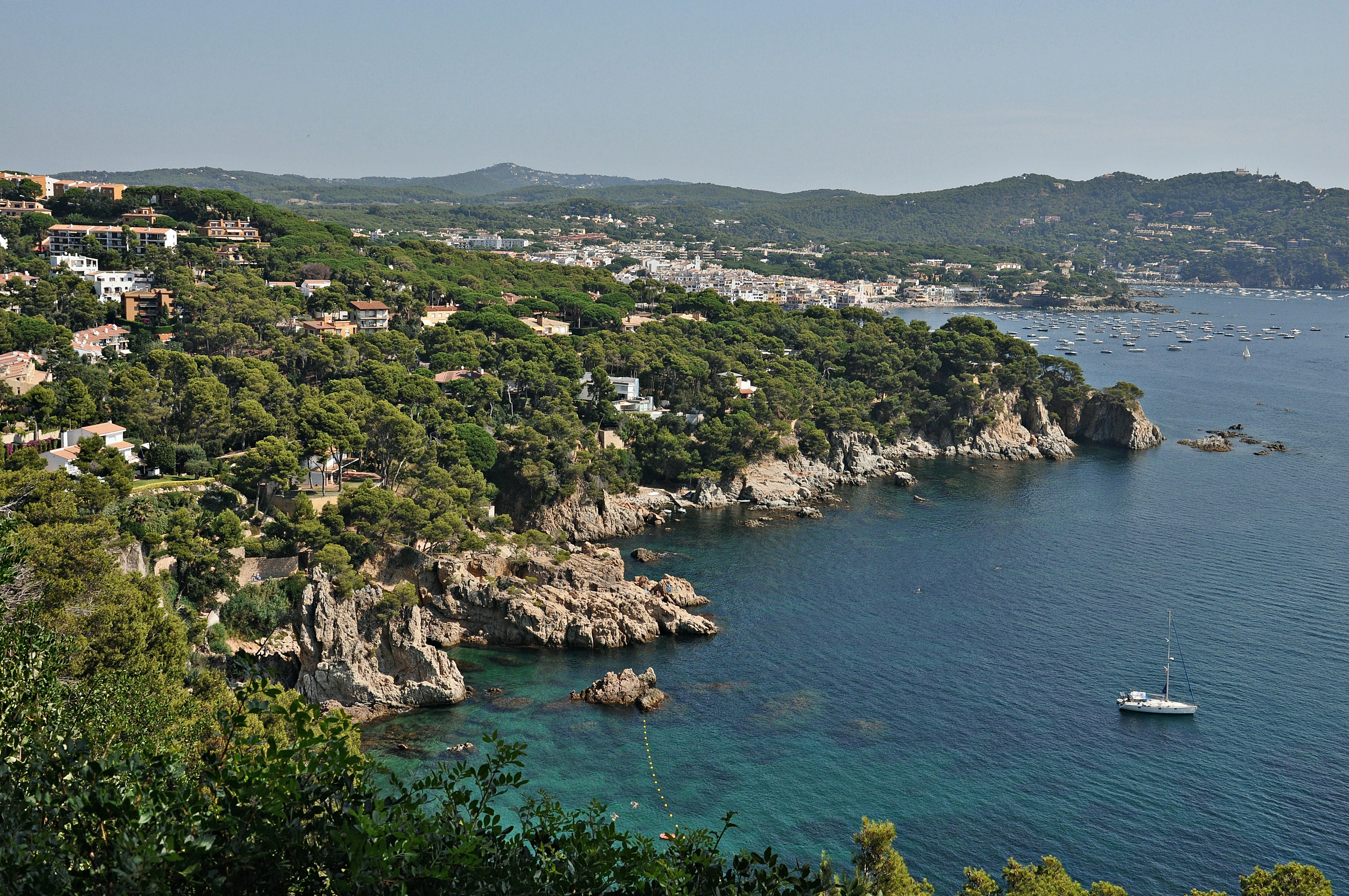
Calella de Palafrugell

The southernmost part of the Costa Brava belongs to the comarca of Selva, whose capital is Santa Coloma de Farners, about 20 kilometres (12 mi) from the Mediterranean Sea. Tossa de Mar is located to the north of the coastline, with several resorts and small bays along the littoral. Lloret de Mar, located to the south of Tossa, is the largest resort on the Costa Brava, with a population of over 200,000 at its peak during the summer. Blanes is the southernmost town on the Costa Brava and is the third most populous municipality of the Province of Girona.

In the middle of the Costa Brava, about 30 kilometres (19 mi) inland from the Mediterranean Sea, lies Girona, the capital of the comarca of Gironès and the Province of Girona. The city has a population of almost 100,000 and lies at the confluence of the Onyar, Güell, Galligants and Ter rivers. Ten kilometres north of Girona is Banyoles, the capital of the comarca of the Pla de l'Estany, on the shore of the Lake of Banyoles. Both the Gironès and the Pla de l'Estany are the inland comarques of the Costa Brava.

=== Rivers ===
The main rivers that pour their waters into the Costa Brava are:

- Muga, which pours its waters at Empuriabrava, Castelló d'Empúries.
- Fluvià, which pours its waters near Sant Pere Pescador.
- Ter, which pours its waters near L'Estartit, Torroella de Montgrí.
- Tordera, which pours its waters near Blanes, marking the southernmost part of the Costa Brava.

=== Climate ===
Costa Brava has a typical Mediterranean climate, mild and temperate, characterised by hot, dry summers and moderately cold winters. The annual average temperature ranges from 7 to 28 °C, while the highest temperatures are recorded in the months of July and August.

== History ==
Until after the First World War, the beaches along the coast of Catalonia served for Sunday leisure pursuits for the local people, plus one or two from neighbouring villages. While world tourism had discovered the Côte d'Azur by that time, the Costa Brava remained unknown to it.

A few years after the Spanish Civil War when some sort of order had been restored, the gradual breaking down of Spain's international isolation in the 1950s cleared the way for new options in tourism. The sea and the sun were drawing increasing numbers of people, which combined with the Côte d'Azur already being overcrowded in those days, enhanced the appeal of Costa Brava for holiday-makers who made their way there.

In the 1950s, the Costa Brava was identified by the Spanish government and local entrepreneurs as being suitable for substantial development as a holiday destination, mainly for package holiday tourists from Northern Europe and especially, the United Kingdom and France. The combination of a very good summer climate, nature, excellent beaches, and a favourable foreign exchange rate was exploited by the construction of large numbers of hotels and apartments in such seaside resorts as Blanes, Tossa de Mar and Lloret de Mar. Tourism rapidly took over from fishing as the principal business of the area.

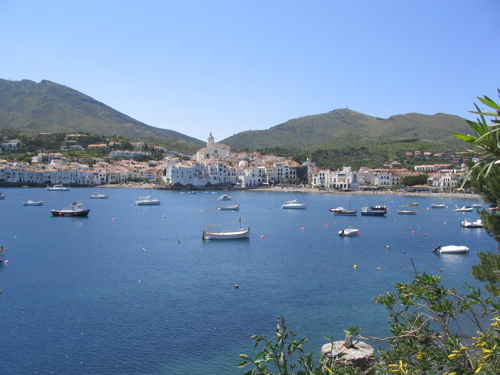
Cadaqués, an artist's paradise

== Culture ==
While part of the Costa Brava coastline lent itself to tourist developments on a very large scale, other parts have retained a more traditional look. Small towns like Cadaqués, which is close to the French border and close to the foothills of the Pyrenees, have attracted artists, such as Salvador Dalí, Joan Miró and Pablo Picasso. The Dalí Theatre and Museum in Figueres is one of the most important and visited museums in Catalonia. One can also visit Dalí's House-Museum in Port Lligat, near Cadaqués and the Castle of Púbol in Púbol. The coast between Roses and Tossa de Mar has many delightful small coastal towns, such as Pals, Begur, Tamariu, S'Agaró, Empuriabrava, Llafranc, L'Estartit, Aigua Blava, Fornells, Calella de Palafrugell, Calonge, Palamós and Sant Feliu de Guíxols.

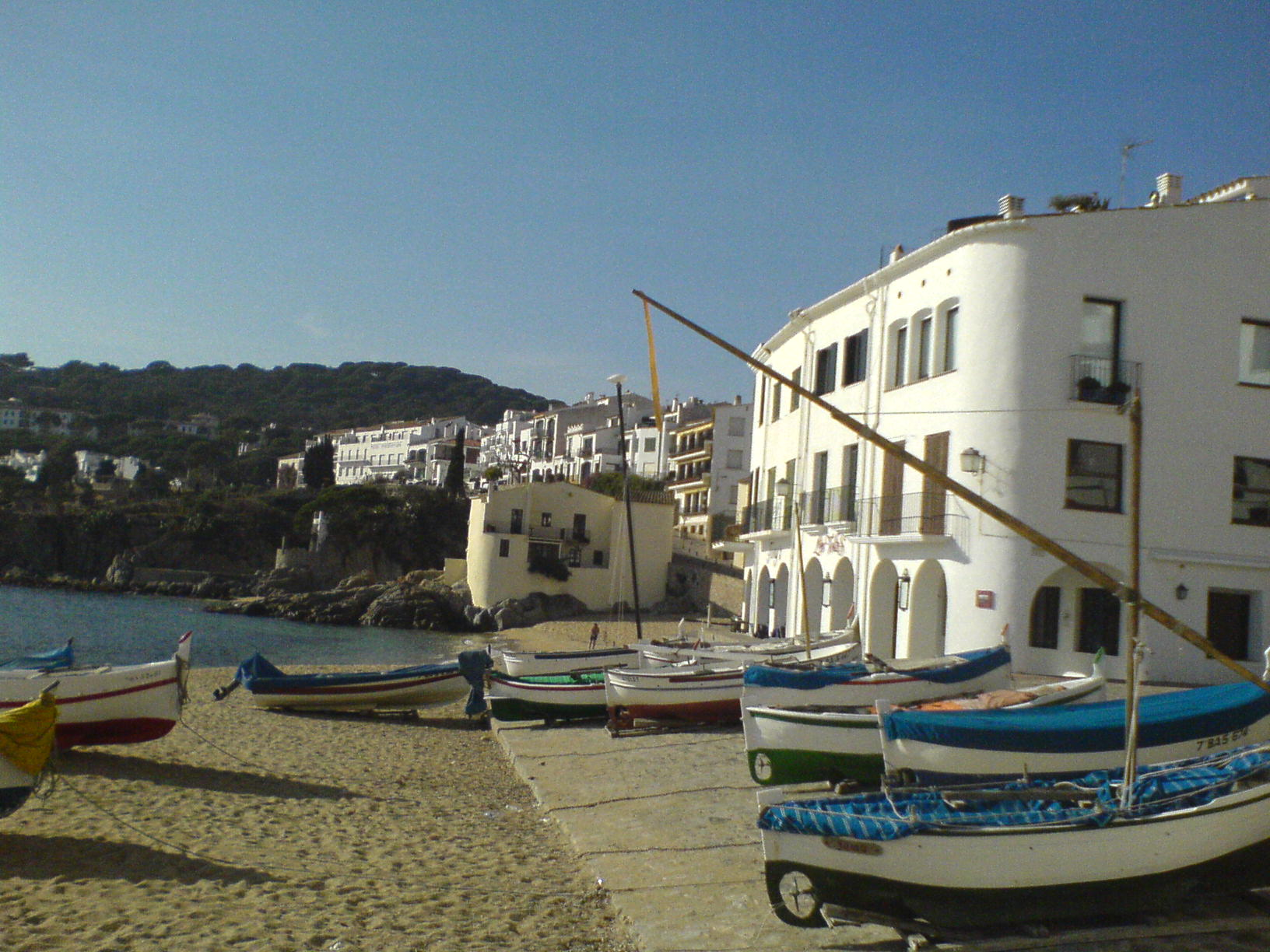
Calella de Palafrugell is one of the smaller resort towns in the Costa Brava.

Further south, Blanes is known for its connection with renowned Chilean author Roberto Bolaño.

=== Museums and collections ===
The great artistic collection is a set of nearly fifty museums and collections listed among the five counties that make up the name of the Costa Brava. From north to south:

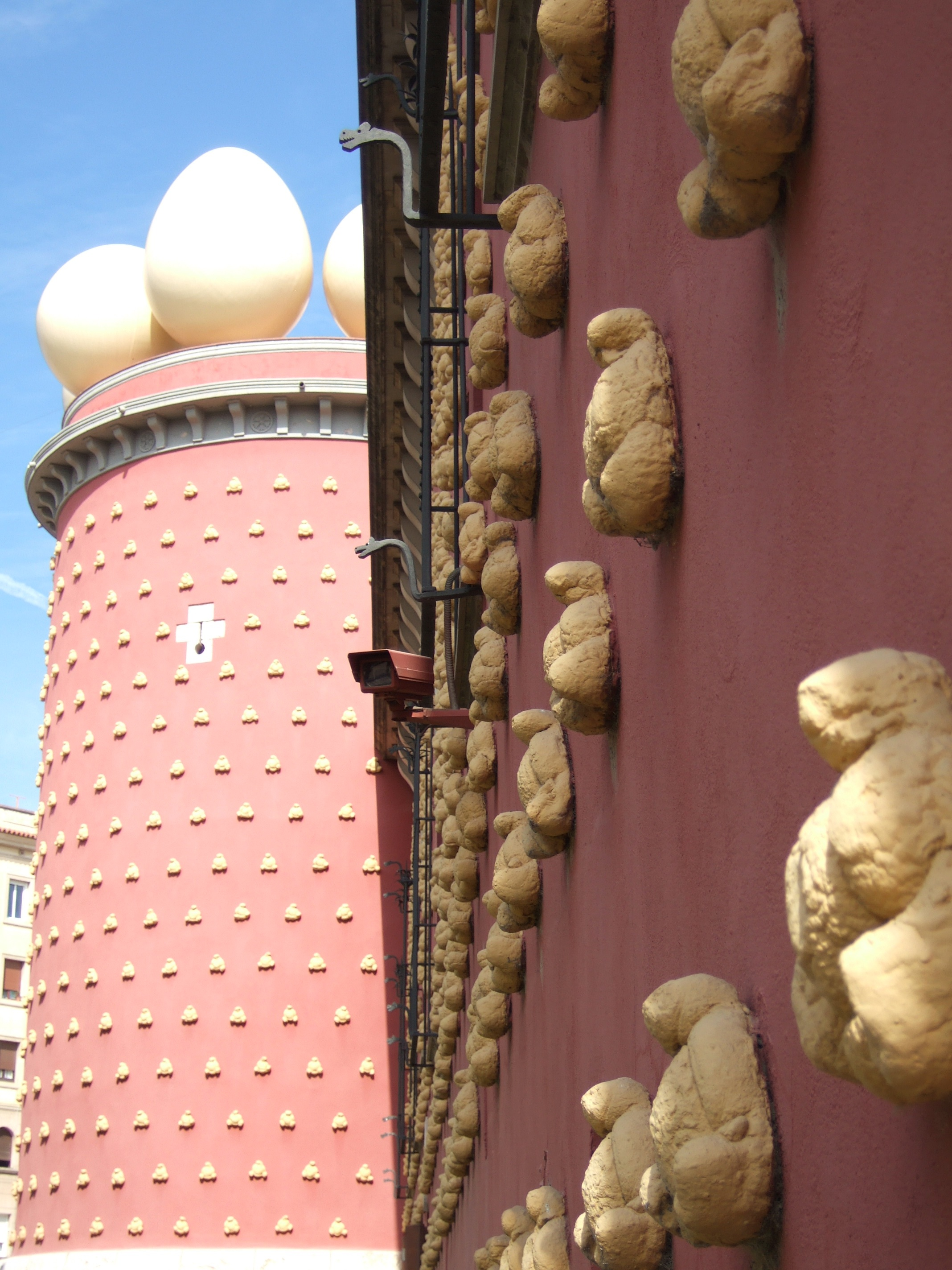
Torre Galatea in Figueres

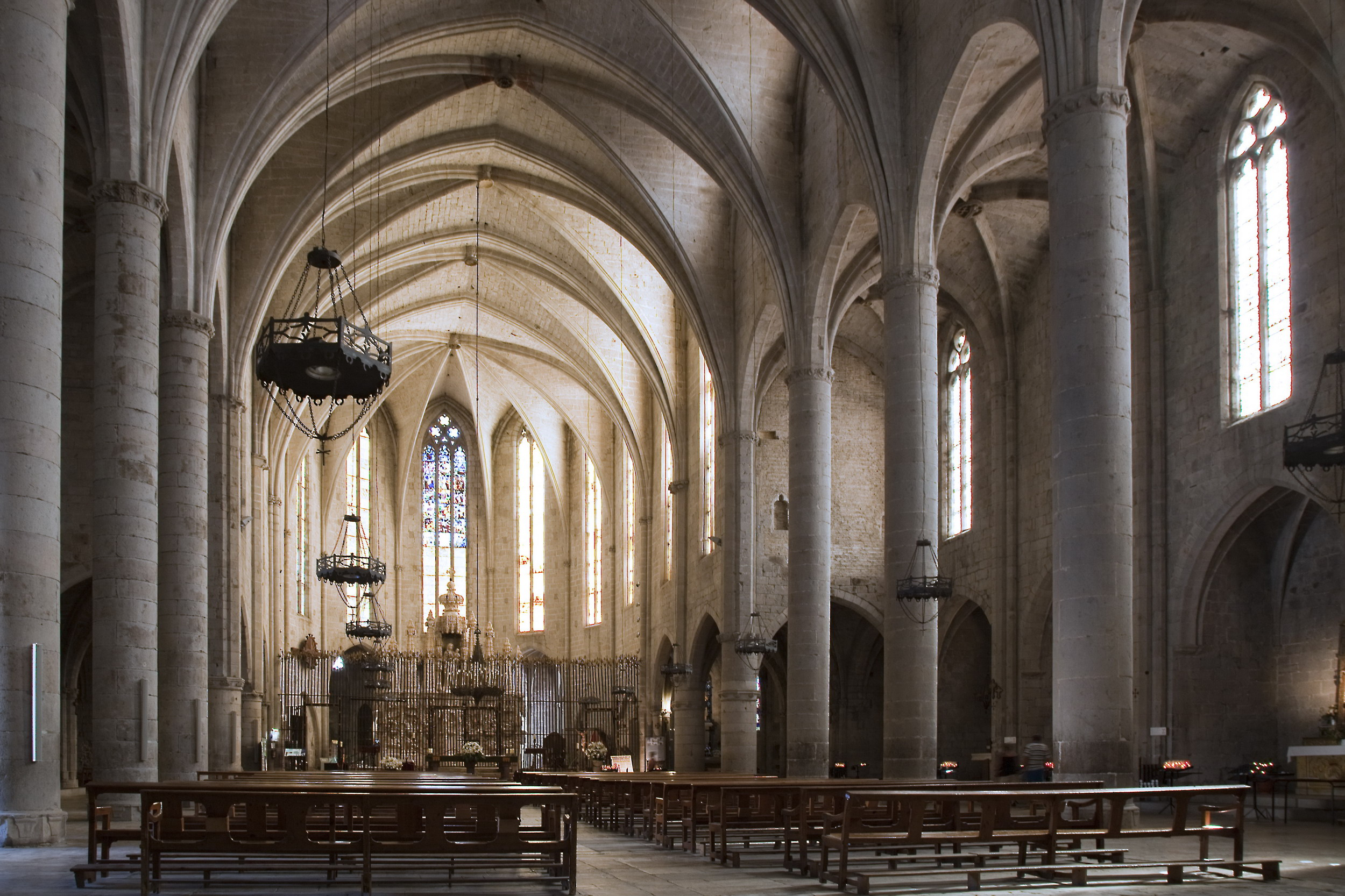
Basilica of Castelló d'Empúries

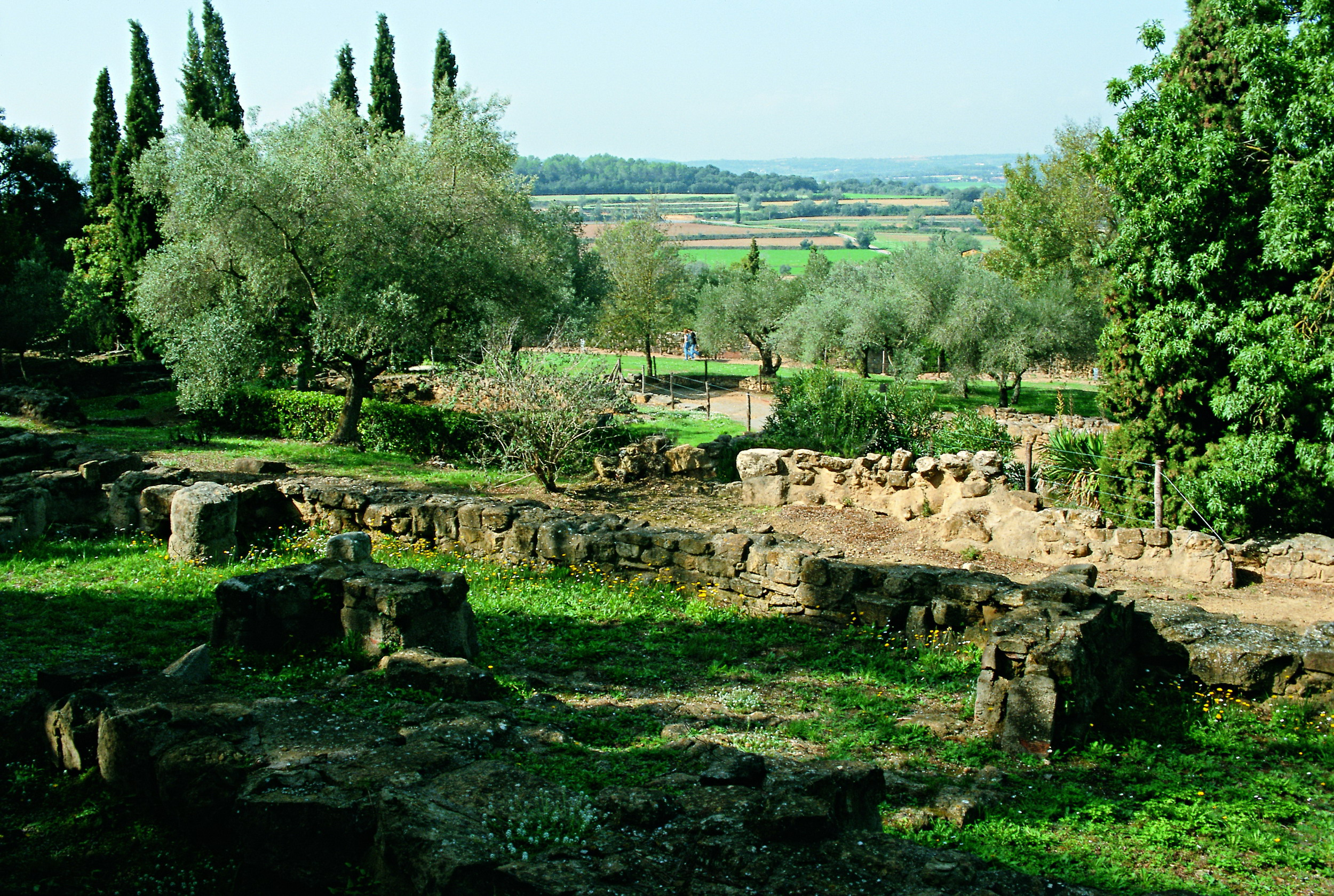
Iberian village of Ullastret

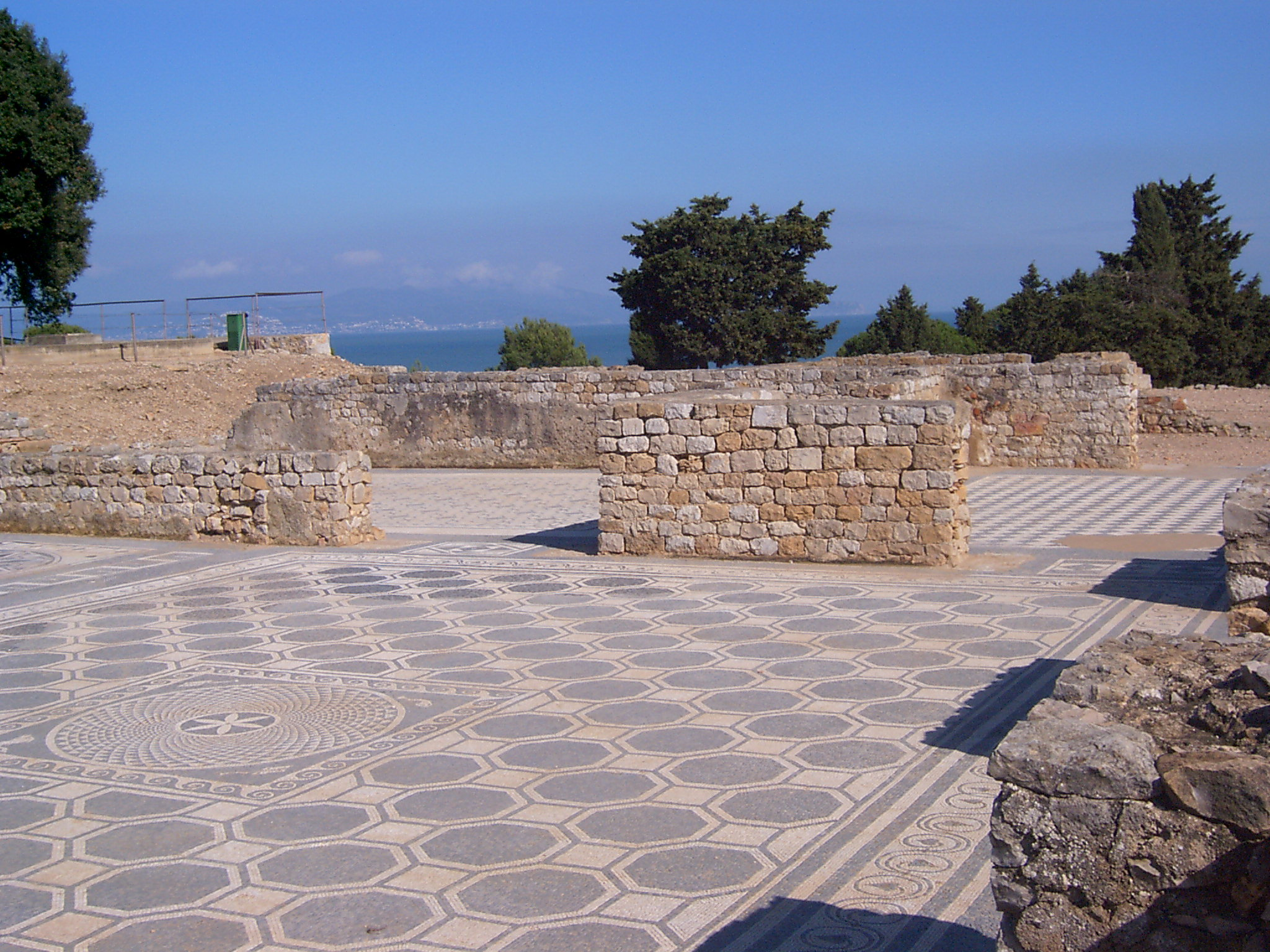
Empúries, mosaic floor

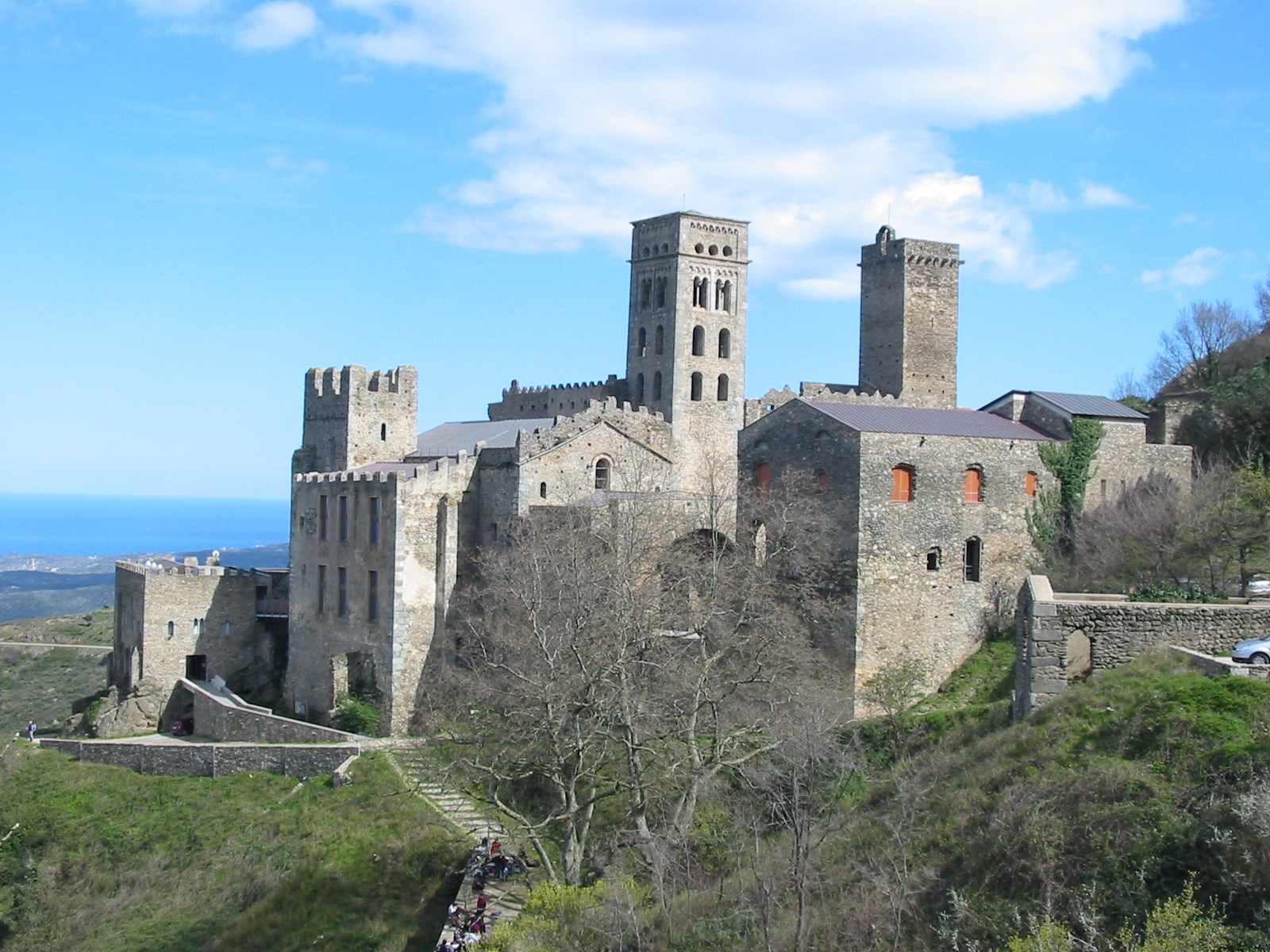
Sant Pere de Rodes

==== Alt Empordà ====
- Exile Memorial Museum Collection in La Jonquera
- Watercolor Museum. Collection Foundation J. Martínez Lozano in Llançà
- Municipal Museum of Cadaqués in Cadaqués
- Museum of the Citadel Collection in Roses
- Museum of Peralada Castle Collection in Peralada
- Museum of Taps Collection in Capmany

in L'Escala

- The Anchovy and Salt Museum
- Museum Vicenç Folgado Collection
- Archaeology Museum of Catalonia-Empúries

in Castelló d'Empúries

- Collection of the Parish Museum of Castelló d'Empúries
- Museum Curia-Prison
- Ecomuseum-Flour Mill in Castelló d'Empúries

in Figueres

- Dalí Theatre and Museum
- Museum of the Empordà
- Technical Museum of l'Empordà
- National Toy Museum of Catalonia

==== Baix Empordà ====
- Farm Museum Collection in Torroella de Fluvià
- Gala-Dalí Castle Museum in La Pera

in Torroella de Montgrí

- Museum of the Mediterranean
- Collection Museum of Painting Palau Solterra
- Archaeology Museum of Catalonia-Ullastret in Ullastret
- Rural Museum in Palau-sator
- Collection Museum of Underwater archaeology, Ca la Pruna in Pals

in Palafrugell

- Foundation Collection Josep Pla
- Foundation Collection Vila Casas-Can Mario
- Fishing Museum in Palamós
- Collection Dolls Museum in Platja d'Aro
- Xevi Collection – The Magic House in Santa Cristina d'Aro

in Sant Feliu de Guíxols

- History Museum Casa Alberti
- Historical Museum of the City
- Museum of the History of Toy
- Salvage Maritime Museum

==== Plà de l'Estany ====
in Banyoles

- Regional Archaeological Museum of Banyoles
- Darder Museum and Interpretation of space, both in Lake of Banyoles

==== Gironès ====
- Collection Museum Raset in Cervià de Ter
- Historical Museum of the City of Girona in Amer
- Collection Museum of the Water in Salt

in Girona:

- Archaeology Museum of Catalonia -Girona
- Cinema Museum
- Art Museum of the Province of Girona
- Jewish Heritage Museum Collection
- Small Fantasy Museum, Llorenç Deulofeu Collection
- Treasure Museum of the Cathedral of Girona
- Collection Museum Foundation Emili Vilà in Llagostera

==== Selva ====
- Collection Municipal Museum Guilleries in Sant Hilari Sacalm
- Collection of the Museum Trias of Cookies in Santa Coloma de Farners
- Art Park in Cassà de la Selva
- Ethnological Museum Montseny, La Gabella in Arbúcies
- Josep Aragay Museum in Breda
- Collection Salvador Claret Automobile in Sils

in Tossa de Mar

- Collection of Mediterranean Lighthouse Interpretation
- Municipal Museum of Tossa (Work Chagall)
- Maritime Museum Collection – Can Garriga in Lloret de Mar

== General information ==
=== Language ===
Catalonia has three official languages, Catalan, Castilian Spanish and Aranese, although the latter is only generally spoken only in the Val d'Aran. Most of the local population of the Costa Brava habitually speak Catalan, and most are also fluent in Castilian Spanish.

=== Public holidays ===
The following public holidays are celebrated throughout the Costa Brava:

- 1 January (New Year's Day)
- 1 May (Labour Day)
- 24 June (Saint John's Day)
- 15 August (The Holy Assumption)
- 11 September (Catalan National Festival)
- 1 November (All Saint's Day)
- 6 December (Day of the Spanish Constitution)
- 8 December (Day of the Blessed Virgin)
- 25 December (Christmas Day)
- 26 December (Saint Stephen's Day)

In addition to these, and through an order from the Ministry of Employment, there will be two local festivals, to be paid and not recoverable, at the proposal of the respective municipalities.

== Events and festivals ==
Pablo Casals, Manuel de Falla and Isaac Albéniz are some of the great figures who have left their mark on the Costa Brava. However, one of the first music festival organisers was Josep Ensesa, who opened the doors and gardens of Senya Blanca, his house in S'Agaró, to music lovers in 1956 with a series of concerts christened the International Music Festival. The success of this festival led other Costa Brava towns to host similar events and nowadays almost all the towns on the Costa Brava hold annual musical events.

Music forms part of the character of many towns and of the several events held by them over the course of the year. However, it is in the summer when emblematic venues such as gardens, covered squares, cloisters, monasteries or waterside venues host internationally renowned musical and cultural events. These summer events showcase all kinds of music, including classical music, pop and rock, havaneres (colonial sea shanties) and Catalan sardana music.

But there are a number of festivals in Costa Brava that stand out above the rest in terms of their history, originality or colour. These include the procession Dansa de la Mort (Dance of Death) in Verges on Maundy Thursday and the Dance of Death, with characters donning skeleton outfits dancing in the streets, the living Way of the Cross in Sant Hilari Sacalm, the floral carpet festival in Arbúcies, the Hobby Horse dance in Sant Feliu de Pallerols, the Ball del Cornut and La Plantada de l'Arbre (The Planting of the Tree) of May in Cornellà del Terri... not to mention the major music festivals, some of them internationally renowned, such as Peralada Castle, Cap Roig Garden Festival in Calella de Palafrugell and Torroella de Montgrí festivals, which draw world-class performers, as well as opera and contemporary music figures.

=== Calendar ===
- Cap Roig Gardens Festival: Calella de Palafrugell in the auditorium of the Botanical Garden, located in a particularly unique place, the sea, is the seat of this summer festival is open to different stage disciplines. Early July to mid August.
- Music Festival in Torroella de Montgrí: Torroella de Montgrí at the Festival began in 1980 and has always called the Western classical music as a centrepiece of its programming, but over time it has been introducing extra musical elements and other types of samples and cultures. Late July to mid August.
- International Music Festival of Peralada Castle: a Peralada, held continuously since 1987 in July and August in the monumental Peralada Castle.
- Festival Porta Ferrada: Sant Feliu de Guixols, Catalonia is the oldest, was born in 1958 at the Monastery of Sant Feliu de Guixols and its name responds to the oldest part of this monumental. Mid July to mid August.
- International Music Festival of Cadaques: Cadaques in the first week of August. Festival has sought to reflect the eclectic art of the town that inspired countless artists. Its programming covers a wide range of musical genres, from jazz to classical music or even pop and rock, always committed to good music and keeping their uniqueness.
- Music Festival Calonge: Calonge is the oldest festival in the Costa Brava (since 1968). Classical, folk, flamenco, jazz and soul. August.
- Musicant: Campllong a festival that is committed to spreading the musical repertoire Catalan for all time. Late August and early September.
- Schubertíada: a Vilabertran, where festival include Schubert recitals of lieder, but also programmed works by other composers, especially of his contemporaries. Mid-August to first week of September.
- Acústica Festival: Figueres, below the acoustic or unplugged, there are both emerging and established artists. First week of September.
- Black Music Festival: Salt, Catalan black music festival. In mid March to mid April.
- Guitar Festival Girona in different locations in the province of Girona. Last half of July until the first week of September.
- Festival of the Voice (a) phònica: Banyoles, explores the possibilities of this element is visible but not everyone has joined. Around 24 June.

== Literary ==
The Costa Brava has been a source of inspiration for many writers. This is clear to see in the countless books dedicated to the area and the thousands that have been written here. Josep Pla, Federico García Lorca, Truman Capote, Salvador Espriu, Joan Maragall and Caterina Albert are just some of these famous writers.

- Roger Weston: The Handler, 2012. The Handler. Novel set in Costa Brava.

== Cinema ==
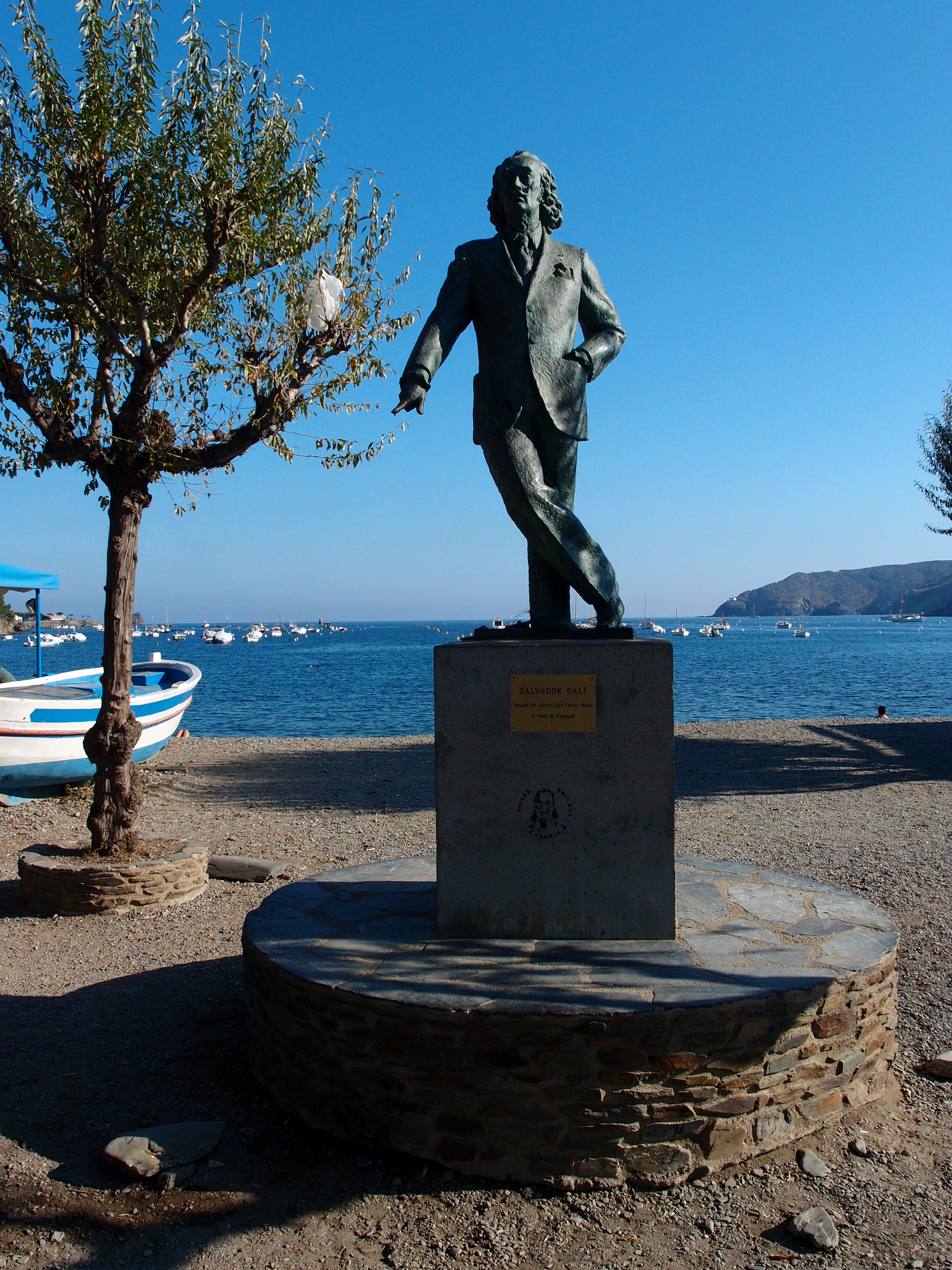
Salvador Dalí sculpture in Cadaqués

Over the course of its history, especially over the last one hundred years, the Costa Brava has been the birthplace and place of residence of artists from various disciplines. Multiple political, intellectual and social figures have passed through or stayed on the Costa Brava, which has contributed to transforming it and boosting its profile both at home and abroad.

Artists and actors in particular have helped to give the area a glamorous image. Elizabeth Taylor, Ava Gardner, Orson Welles, Yves Montand and Douglas Fairbanks all graced the Costa Brava with their glamour, as did Salvador Dalí, Marc Chagall, Dani Karavan (sculptor of the monument to Walter Benjamin in Portbou), Ramon Pichot and many others.

The Costa Brava was a natural film set where producers find the charm that inspires them to create stories starring world-famous actors. Artists also find inspiration for their works and the peace and quiet necessary to produce them.

From the early days of cinema, the Costa Brava featured in many films, which has proved to be an added value in boosting its profile as a tourist destination even further. The attraction of the Costa Brava for local producers and filmmakers from the local area and from Catalonia in general is understandable given its geographical proximity and its accessible locations

It has also proved a popular location with Spanish and foreign studios and directors, who have filmed high-profile films in the area with stellar casts and production values. The commercial success and media buzz created by these productions has made certain locations known all over the world.

Sant Feliu de Guíxols was the most popular location in the counties of Girona for cinema producers and the second-most popular in all Catalonia (after Barcelona). These results are logical enough: the Costa Brava is a potent area full of beauty and diversity, located close to the historical city of Girona with an old quarter that holds a huge amount of visual possibilities.

== Gastronomy ==
Gastronomy plays an important role of the Costa Brava. Anchovies from L'Escala, prawns from Palamós, monkfish from Roses, blue fish from Sant Feliu de Guíxols, rock fish from Begur or skate from Tossa de Mar represent the sea, while turnips from Campmany, onions from Vilabertran and Figueres, rice from Montgrí, beans and peas from Vall d'Aro and apples from Girona represent the land in an elegant fusion of sea and mountain that constitutes the Costa Brava cuisine. However, the gastronomic richness of the Costa Brava is not restricted to its cuisine. Over 2,500 restaurants throughout the counties of Girona welcome diners with a cuisine based on a combination of quality seafood and the best produce of the land.

== Wines ==
The wines of Alt and Baix Empordà fall under the auspices of the DO Empordà regulatory body. Wines have been grown in the region for over 2,500 years, but in the middle of the 20th century, the quality declined greatly in favor of producing cheap, bulk wines aimed at visiting beach tourists. A focus on quality returned to the winemaking due to smaller wineries opening, starting in the mid-1990s. Now, the wines from the region have been subject to high scores and recognition from international critics and have even become the focus of guides created solely for enotourism.

For red varieties, Carignan (legally required to be 'Samsó' on the label) is prevalent, forming the basis of Empordà viniculture, together with Grenache (sometimes known in Empordà as Lledoner). These traditional varieties are complemented by new ones that are being introduced: Tempranillo, Cabernet Sauvignon, Merlot, Syrah, and Marselan.

The most popular white varieties are Grenache Blanc, Grenache and Macabeo. Muscat, Xarel·lo recently planted Chardonnay, Sauvignon Blanc and Gewürztraminer grapes are also grown, but to a much lesser extent.

== Environmental protection ==
In 1998, the coastal towns of the Costa Brava signed a charter, called the Carta de Tossa, which undertook to pursue environmental protection, along with tourism. This recognised the value of the region's wide range of natural habitats and microclimates. The Medes Islands off the coast of L'Estartit are in Spain's first marine reserve and provide a home to a wide range of fish and aquatic flora. The nearby wildfowl reserve on marshlands at Aiguamolls de l'Empordà also saved land from the potential ravages of development.

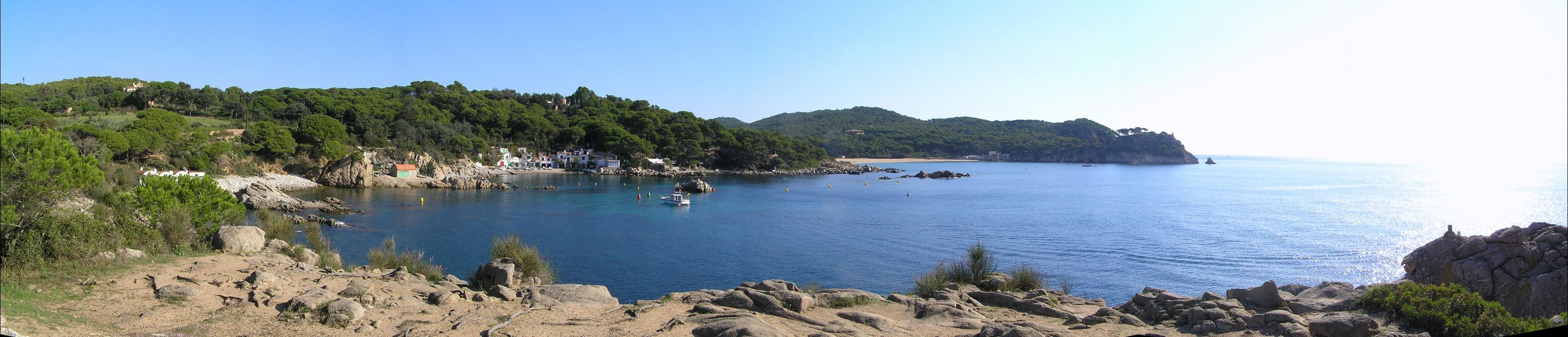
Panorama of Cala S'Alguer and Platja del Castell Palamós

=== Natural parks ===
Three Parks are present in the geography of the Costa Brava.

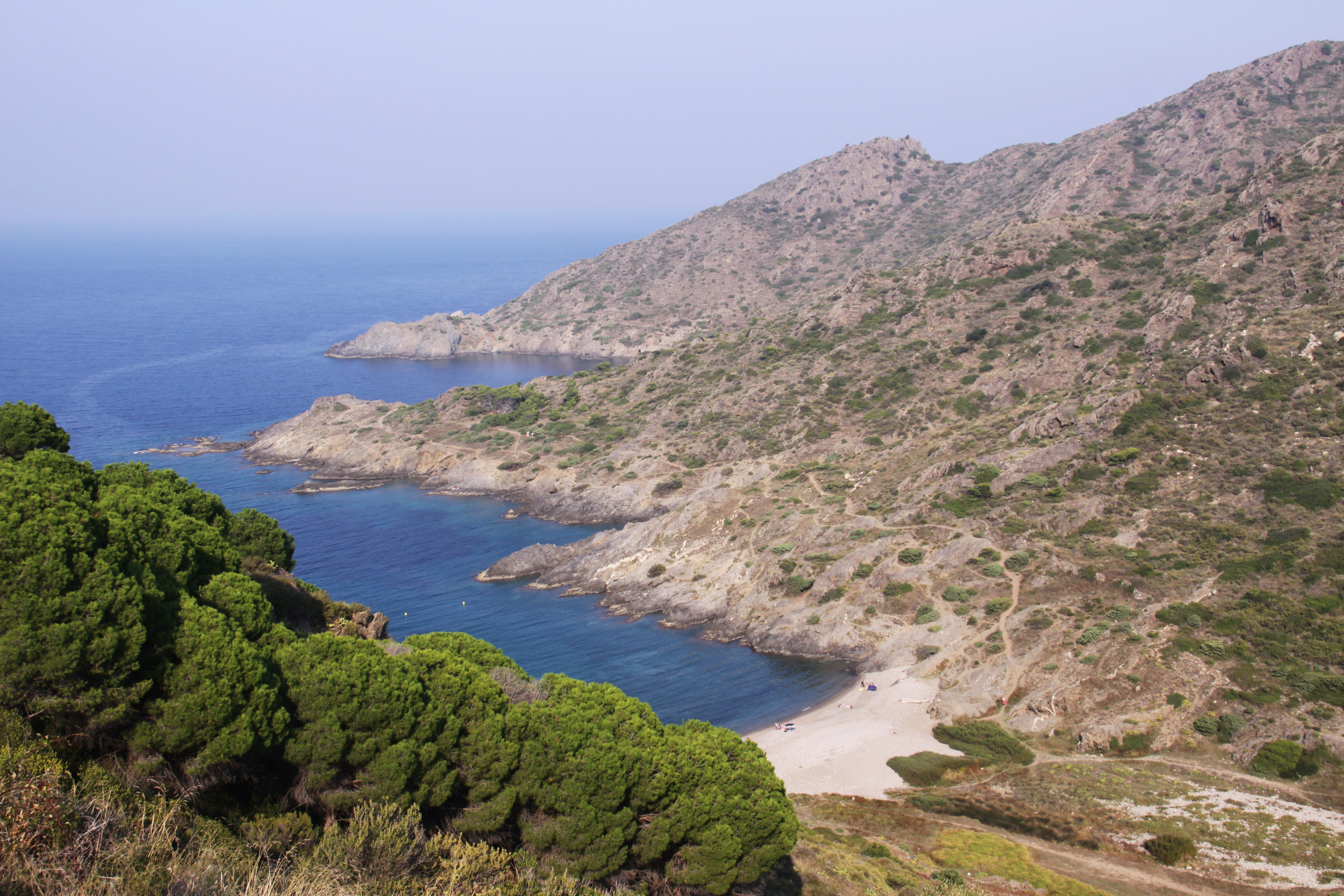
Natural Park of Cap de Creus

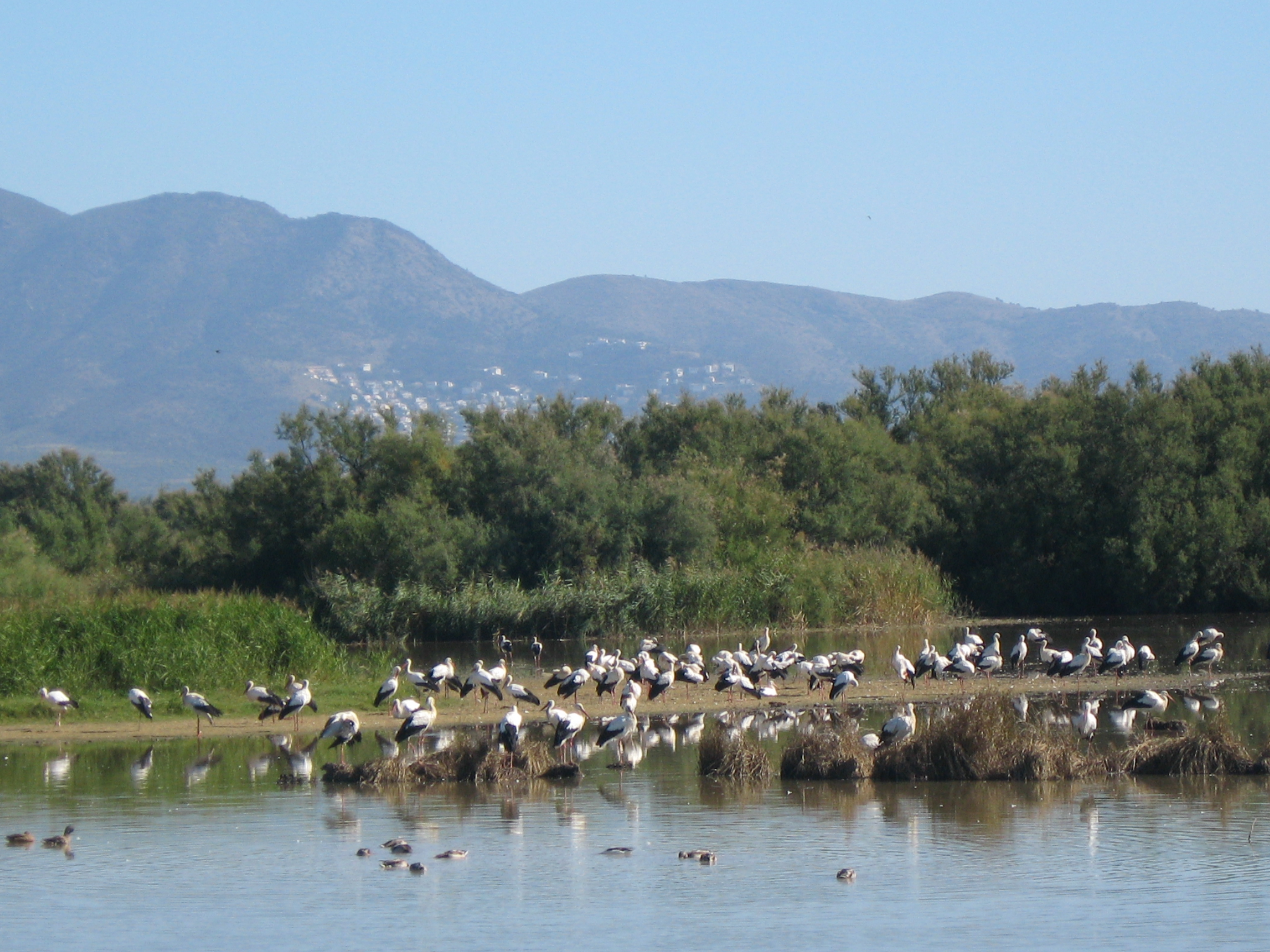
Aiguamolls de l'Empordà

==== Natural Park of Cap de Creus ====
Protection law in this area becomes the Cap de Creus Natural Park, located north of the Costa Brava, in Port de la Selva, one of the most unusual in the Iberian Peninsula. Determined as protected areas the municipalities of El Port de la Selva, La Selva de Mar, Roses, Cadaqués, Palau Saverdera, Pau and Vilajuïga, with an area of 13,886 hectares spread over 10,813 hectares of land and 3,073 of maritime space.

==== Aiguamolls de l'Empordà ====
Located in north of the Costa Brava, between the towns of Castelló d'Empúries-Empuriabrava, Sant Pere Pescador and Roses, this park is the second largest of its kind in Catalonia, as a great number of native species flora and fauna. It is divided into two areas, north and south of the River Muga, comprising the characteristic elements of the landscape of the Alt Empordà.

==== Montseny Natural Park ====
Located in the interior of the southern part of the Costa Brava, in Arbúcies (Selva), Montseny Massif is the largest and highest part of the Catalan pre-coastal mountain range, straddling the provinces of Barcelona and Girona. One of the main values of the massif lies in the extreme variability of environments presents significant result of altitudinal gradients and vegetation and the diversity of its relief. Oak and pine forests, forests of cork oaks, oaks and beech trees are some of the shape almost a forest landscape while serving as a refuge for many animal species typical of environmental contexts of higher latitude.

=== Natural areas ===
More than 30% of the total surface of Girona consist of protected areas of special natural interest:

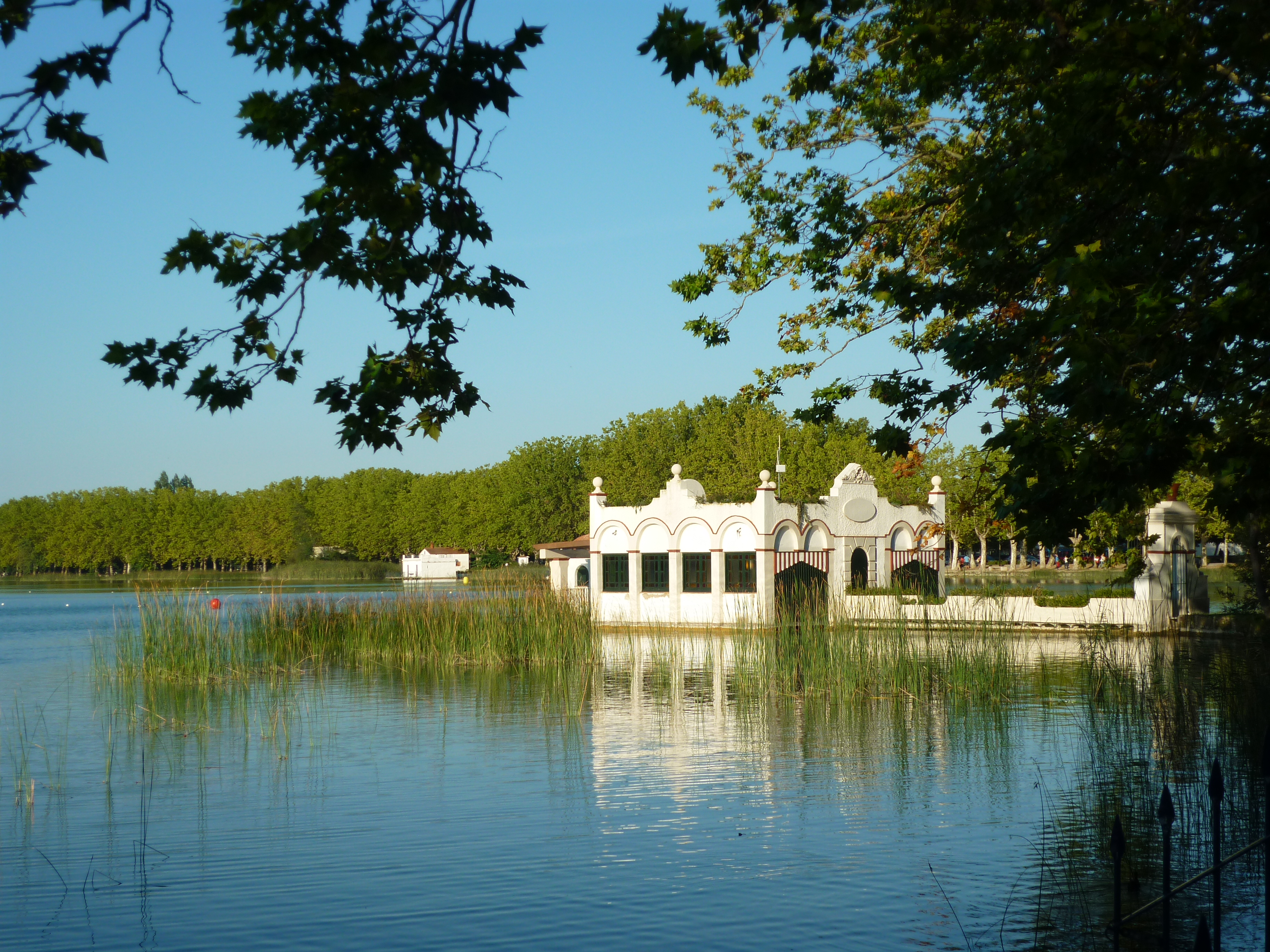
Lake of Banyoles

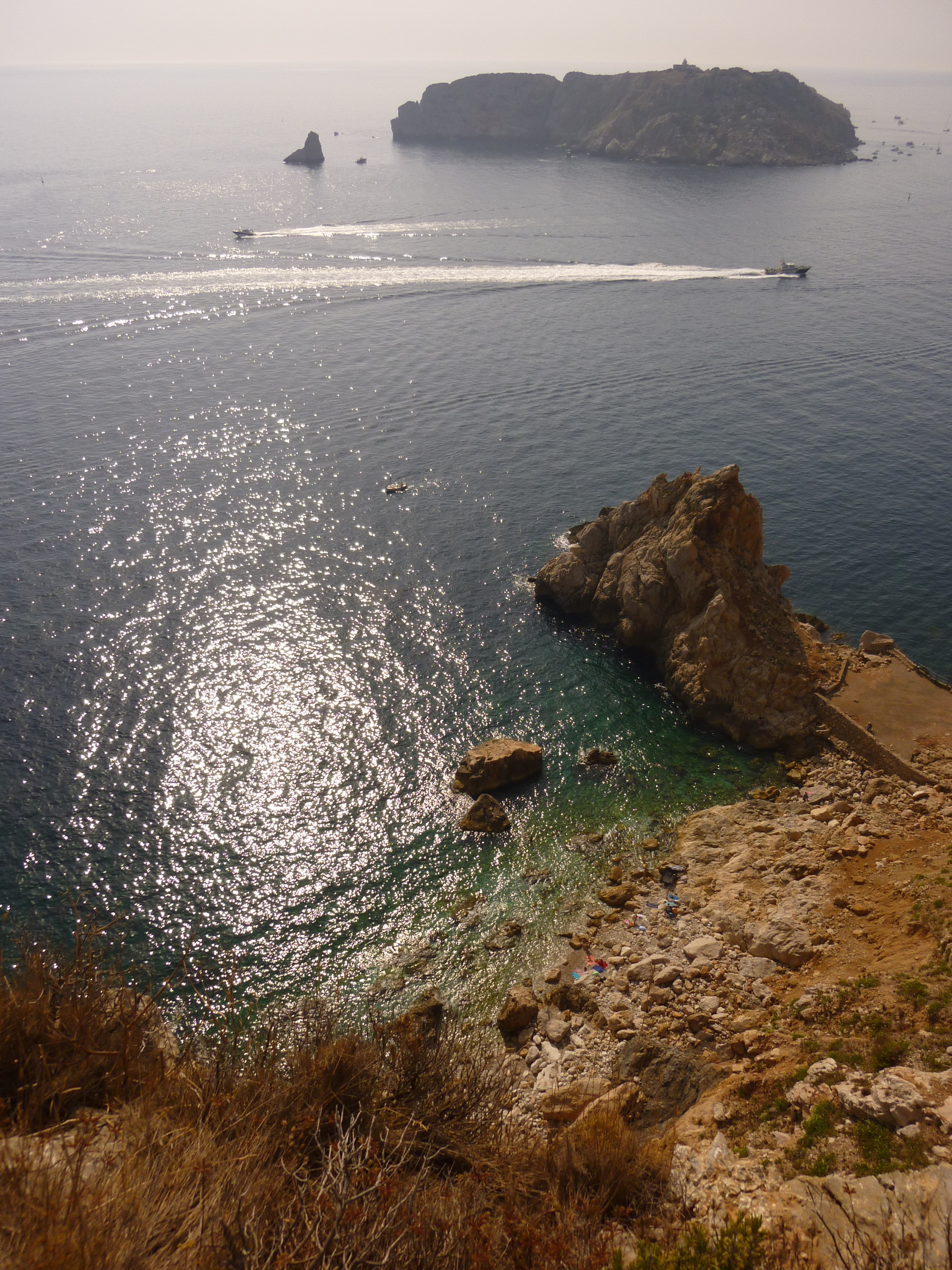
Medes Islands

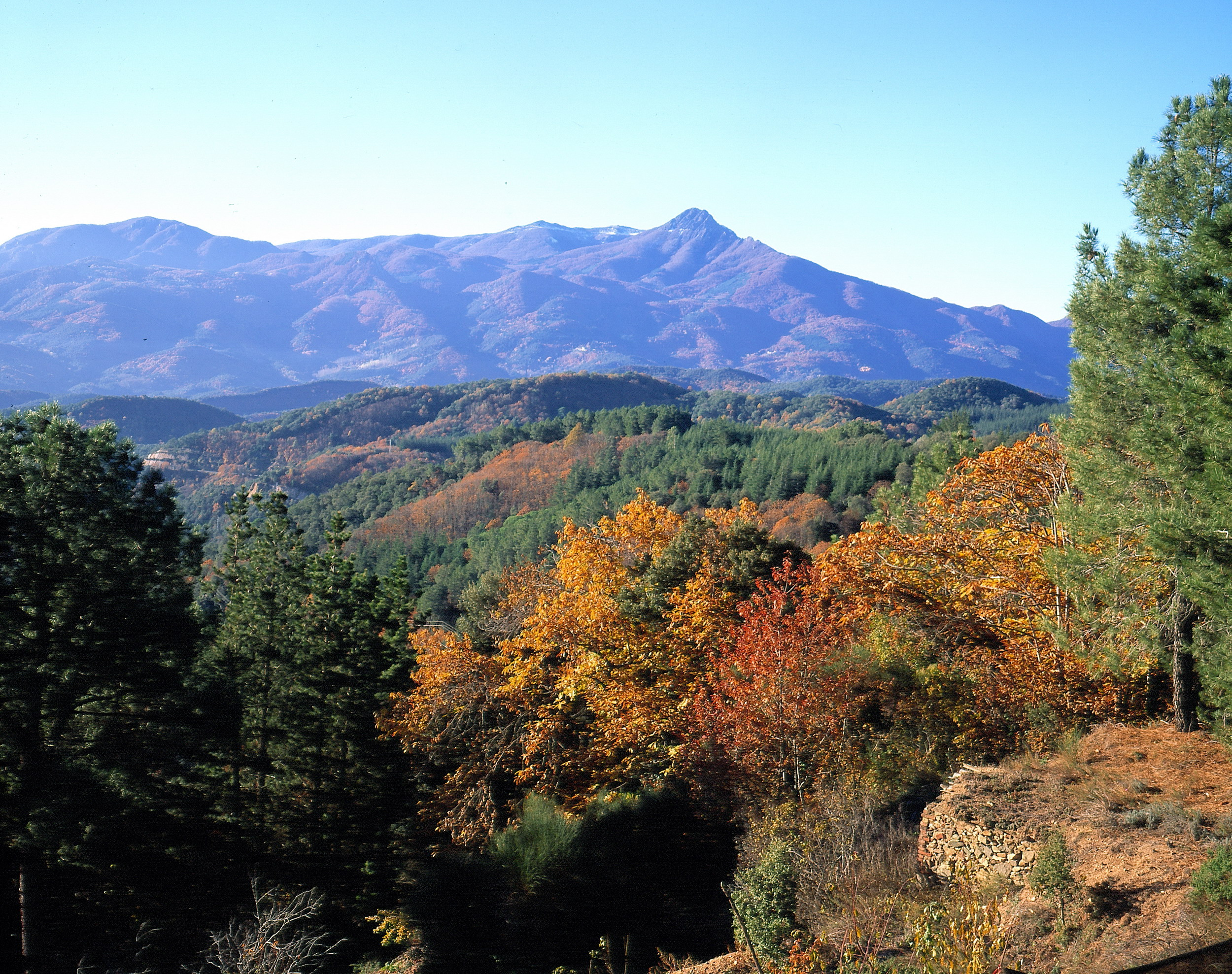
Guilleries Montseny

==== Albera Massif ====
Declared area of Outstanding Natural Beauty, includes the towns of La Jonquera, Rabós d'Empordà, Espolla, Cantallops, Vilamaniscle, Garriguella, Mollet de Peralada and Sant Climent Sescebes. The landscape presents with one of the largest concentrations of megalithic monuments in Catalonia, with small Romanesque churches that make this area one of the most rich heritage and history of the surrounding region of the Alt Empordà. And the Albera Massif presents transition vegetation between the species of the Pyrenean mountains and the Mediterranean, as well as fauna, characterised by great diversity, between the mountain areas and the wetland Catalonia.

==== Lake of Banyoles ====
This area of great landscapes and geology covers the whole of the coast called the Lake of Banyoles, which separates the plains of the Empordà and the Transversal mountain in the region of Garrotxa. Lake of Banyoles, with an area of 107 hectares and a feature-eight, is one of the largest in the Iberian Peninsula. The most important lakes of this system are its origin and source of the feed water through seepage of rain in some parts of the Garrotxa through subterranean flows caused his departure abroad. Lake of Banyoles and the collection of small ponds, present throughout the year and chemical processes of thermal stratification. In addition to these features, concentrated around the lake a wide variety of flora and fauna lake.

==== Medes Islands ====
The small archipelago of the Medes, located in the heart of the Costa Brava, in the town of Torroella de Montgrí (Baix Empordà) and close to the mountain of the same name, is composed of seven islands that are characterised by rich its marine ecosystem. The proximity of the coast and the River Ter these islands provide a great amount of organic matter, allowing the variety of flora and fauna typical of the Medes. Some examples of this variety are the colony of gulls, the peculiar terrestrial vegetation, algae or coralline seabed, where you can go diving so regulated.

==== Montgrí Massif ====
Located between the districts of Alt and Baix Empordà, this limestone massif separates the bays of Roses and Ter, and provides interesting elements of ecological diversity to the landscape. This wild and inhospitable nature makes an exception of the area of the Costa Brava. This area is occupied mainly by pine trees and weeds, in addition to the vegetation that appears not only in forested environments, but throughout the eastern fringe of the mountain, the sea. In this regard include Ferriol and Pedrosa coves, among others.

==== Ses Negres ====
The Marine Reserve of Ses Negres, located in Begur, in the middle of the Costa Brava stretches over 1,300 metres of coastline, including beaches of Sa Riera and Aiguafreda. It has a total area of 80 hectares, which includes the cliffs that surround the mountains of Begur. Buoys and beacons define the protected area and also indicate a navigation channel of limited speed. In the bathing area and apnea, respectful and activities compatible with conservation of the environment, there is a recovery of marine life, years after being declared the reserve.

==== Gavarres Massif ====
Massive features typically Mediterranean. Located between the counties of Girona and Baix Empordà, is the northernmost of the Catalan coastal mountains. The landscape of this area is mainly forest. The nature of Mediterranean forest gives ample importance to the overall bulk comprised mainly holm and cork oaks. The fauna is typical of Mediterranean environments and forest. With regard to heritage, from the days with abundance of megalithic funerary monuments, in addition, the area also includes the medieval defensive buildings and religious buildings pre-Romanesque and Romanesque style.

==== Island of Ter ====
The island of River Ter is a natural area of great ecological value for its biodiversity and for its potential as a setting for environmental education, both for students and for all those who love nature people who visit, where it is favoured because of its proximity to the city of Girona. The area is protected by municipal regulations and by the condition Wildlife Refuge. Presented botanical species of interest, the bell winter woods and some in excellent condition as they have been free from human interference natural setting of the island from the confluence the rivers Ter and Onyar. This fauna, include the otter, genet and various species of butterflies typical of aquatic environments, and a variety of birds such as night heron, the kingfisher and lesser spotted woodpecker, among others. In total, about 200 species have been observed.

==== Cadiretes Massif ====
The Cadiretes Massif (or the bulk of Ardenya) is a natural area that occupies almost the whole town of Tossa de Mar and part of Sant Feliu, Santa Cristina d'Aro, Llagostera, Vidreres, Caldes de Malavella and Lloret de Mar. It is a mountainous terrain, granitic between the sea and the plains of the forest, the highest point of which is Puig Cadiretes (519 metres). The depressions are irrigated by mountain streams typically Mediterranean regime. However, the nature of the terrain makes it create upwelling of water throughout the year, along with humidity and precipitation caused by the screen effect of the mountains before the winds making the bulk elements converge of botanical and faunal clear Atlantic. The coast, with more than six kilometres protected is particularly abrupt, which has facilitated the establishment of several important species which have found an ideal retreat.

==== Guilleries Massif ====
The bulk of Guilleries is located at the northern end of the ridge just behind and beyond the Montseny, the town of Sant Hilari Sacalm is the capital. The massive mountain range old and worn, covered with thick vegetation, has a total area of 12,500 hectares and is located within the Plan of Natural Interest (PEIN). A succession of peaks, form a unique landscape, thick, quiet and wild. The highest point is St. Michael the Ants, with 1,204 metres.

== Beaches and coves ==
Counting beaches and hidden coves surrounded by vegetation, there are 199 such locations in the coastal regions of Costa Brava.

=== Beaches and coves of Alt Empordà ===
- In Portbou: Port Bou Beach and El Pi, and the coves of Les Freses, El Clapé and Les Tres Platgetes.
- In Colera: the Beach of Garbet, of Colera and the Borró / Assutzenes, and the coves Rovellada and Cala Morts/d'en Goixa.
- In Llançà: the Beaches Rastell, d'en Cros, Bramant, El Cau del Llop, El Port, La Farella, Grifeu, La Gota, Canyelles, Les Carboneres and Les Tonyines. Cove Tavallera.
- In El Port de la Selva: the Beaches de l'Erola, Pas, Ribera, of El Port de la Selva and Port de la Vall. Coves Tavellera, Tamariua, Fornells, Cativa, Galladera and Prona.
- In Cadaqués: the Beaches Portal, Port Lligat, Ses Oliveres, Gran, Caials, Es Poal, Llané Gran and Port-Alguer. Coves S'Alqueria, Bona, Sa Conca, Ros, Fredosa, Culip, Guillola and Jugadora.
- In Roses: the Beaches Salatar, Santa Margarida, La Nova, La Punta, Almadrava, Canyelles, El Rastrell and Palangrers. Coves Jòncols, Montjoi, Murtra, Pelosa, Bonifaci, Calís, Calitjàs, Canadell and Rustella.
- In Empuriabrava-Castelló d'Empúries: the Beaches la Rubina, Empuriabrava and Can Comes.
- In Sant Pere Pescador : the Beaches Sant Pere, La Gola, La Txarraca and Les Dunes.
- In L'Escala: the Beaches Riells, Riuet, Sant Martí d'Empúries, L'Escala, Moll Grec, Les Muscleres, Rec del Molí, Port d'en Perris, and Portitxol. Coves of Mateua Island, Montgó and La Creu.

=== Beaches and coves of Baix Empordà ===
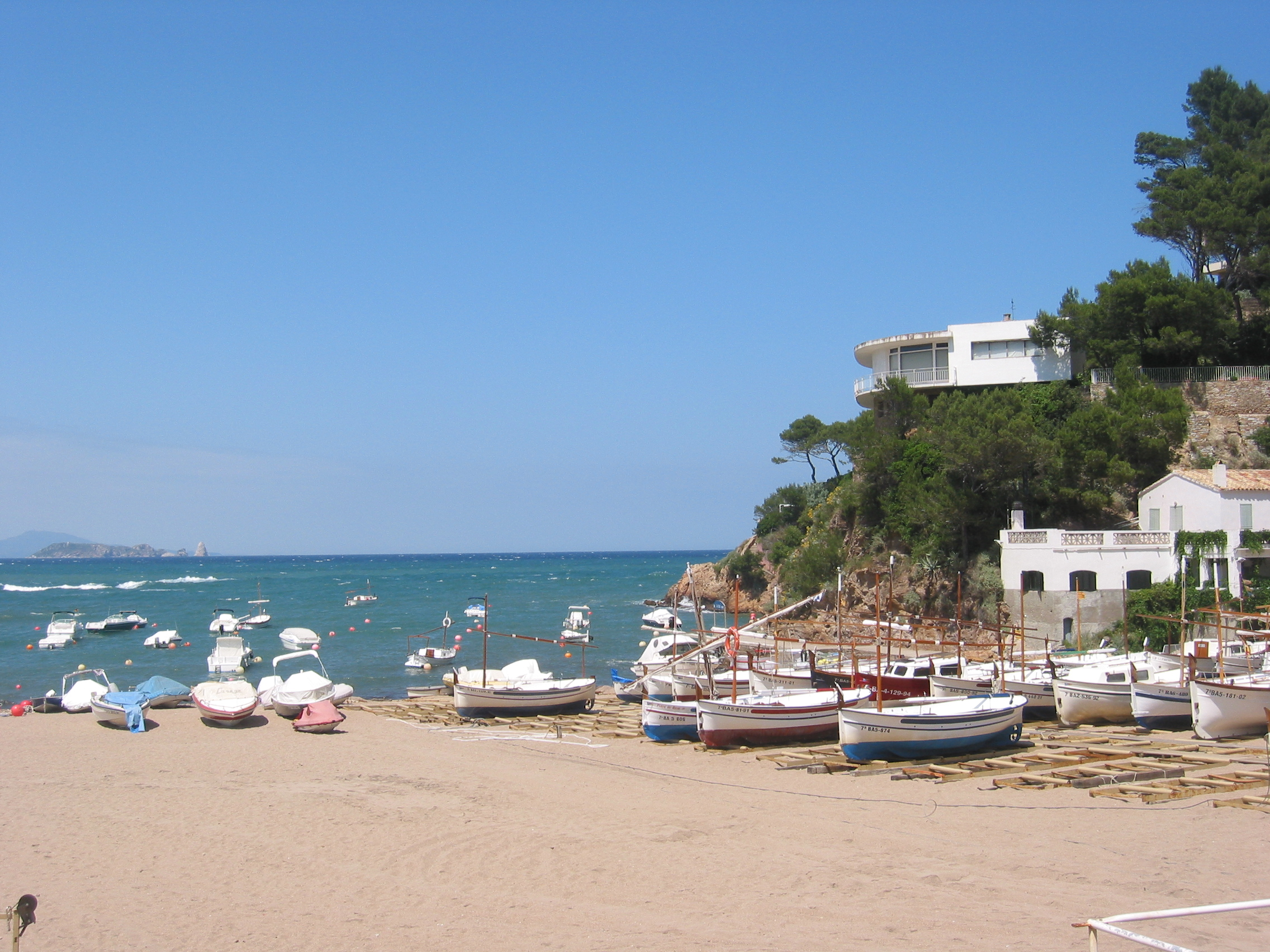
Sa Riera Beach

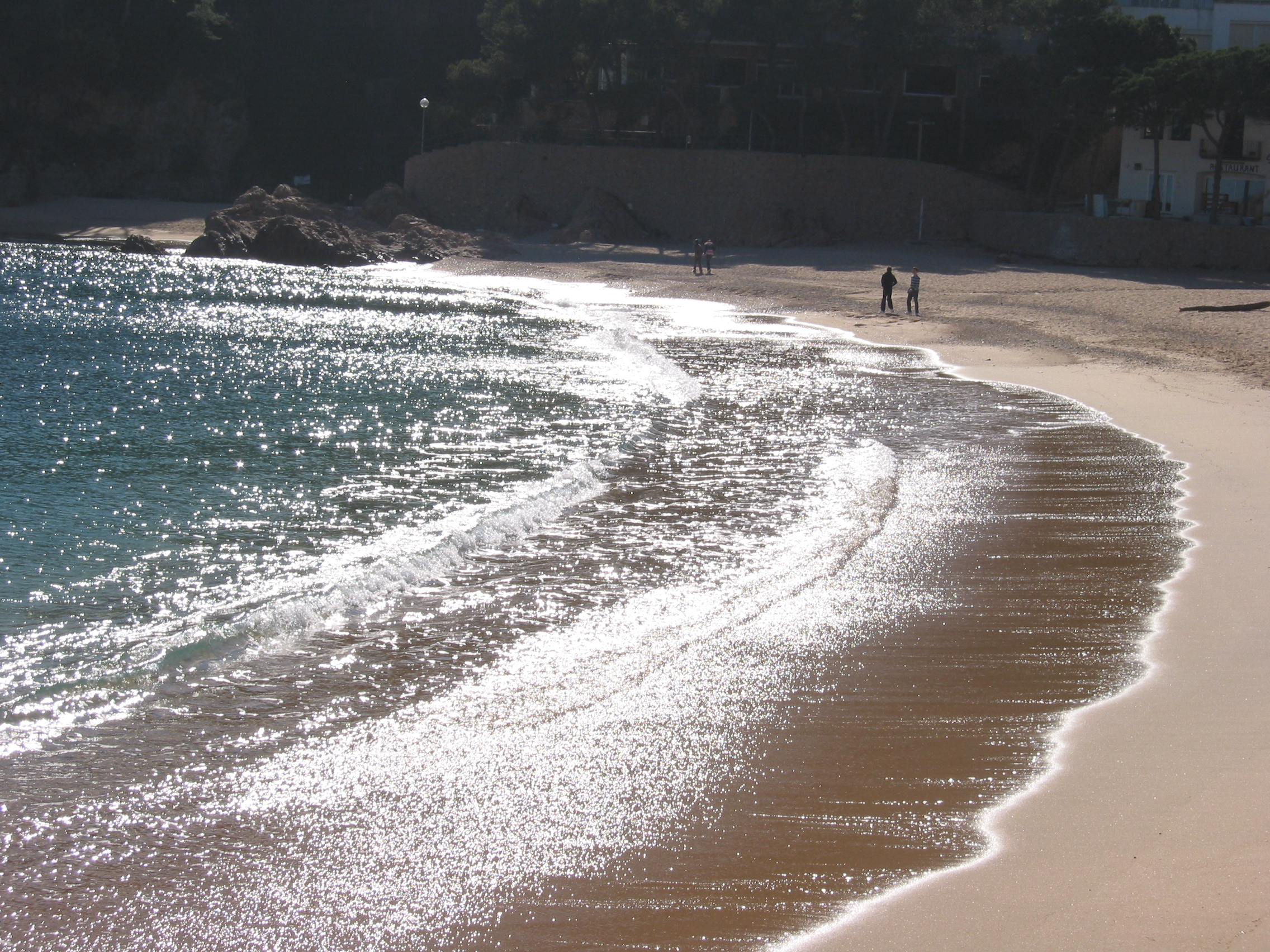
Tamariu Beach

- In L'Estartit-Torroella de Montgrí: the Beaches L'Estartit and La Fonollera, between La Gola and La Pletera.
- In Pals: the Large Beach of Pals and Grau Beach.
- In Begur: the Beaches of Racó, Fona, Aiguablava and Sa Riera. Coves Sa Tuna, Aiguafreda, l'Illa Roja and Fornells.
- In Tamariu-Palafrugell: the Beach of Lliris and Coves Tamariu, Aigua Dolça, Aigua Xelida, Marquesa and Pedrosa.
- In Mont-ras: the Coves Vedell, del Crit and Font Morisca.
- In Llafranc: the Beach of Llafranc and the Cove El Cau.
- In Calella de Palafrugell-Palafrugell: the beaches of Sant Roc/dels Canyers, Canadell, Calau, Platgeta, Port de la Mala Espina and Port Pelegrí. The coves the Russian Bath/Massoni, Golfet and Port Bo.
- In Palamós: the Beaches Remendon, La Fosca, Castell, cap de Planes, the Large Beach of Palamós and the little Beach Sa Tamardia. Coves S'Alguer, Canyers, Pots, Roca Bona, Corbs, Sa Corbetera, Caleta del Morró del Vedell, Estreta, Sanià and Margarida.
- In Calonge: the Beach of Torre Valentina, Es Monestri, Can Cristus/Ses Torretes, Sant Antoni and Les Torretes. Coves Roques Planes, Cap Roig, Comtat Sant Jordi and Belladona.
- In Platja d'Aro-Castell Platja d'Aro: the Large Beach and Bays Rovira, El Pi, Canyers and Sa Cova.
- In Santa Cristina d'Aro: Coves Vallpresona, Caleta de Cuncagats, La Font, de El Senyor Ramon and Joana.
- In S'Agaró-Castell Platja d'Aro: the Beach of S'Agaró and the Coves s Sa Conca and Pedrosa.
- In Sant Feliu de Guíxols: the Beaches Port Salvi, Can Dell, Canyerets, de Saint Feliu and Saint Pol. Coves Sa Caleta, Ametller, Urgell, Vigatà, Jonca, Maset and Peix.

=== Beaches and coves of Selva ===
- In Tossa de Mar: the Beaches of Santa Maria de Llorell, El Reig, the large Beach of Tossa de Mar and Mar Menuda. Coves Porto Pi, Figuera, Carles, D'es Codolar, Bona, Salions, Futadera, Giverola, Llevadó, Morisca and Pola.
- In Lloret de Mar: the Beaches Sa Boadella, Treumal, Fenals, Cala Canyelles, Santa Cristina and the Beach of Lloret de Mar.
- In Blanes: the Beaches S'Abanell, Blanes, Punta de Santa Anna and Treumal. Bay Saint Francis.

== Gardens ==
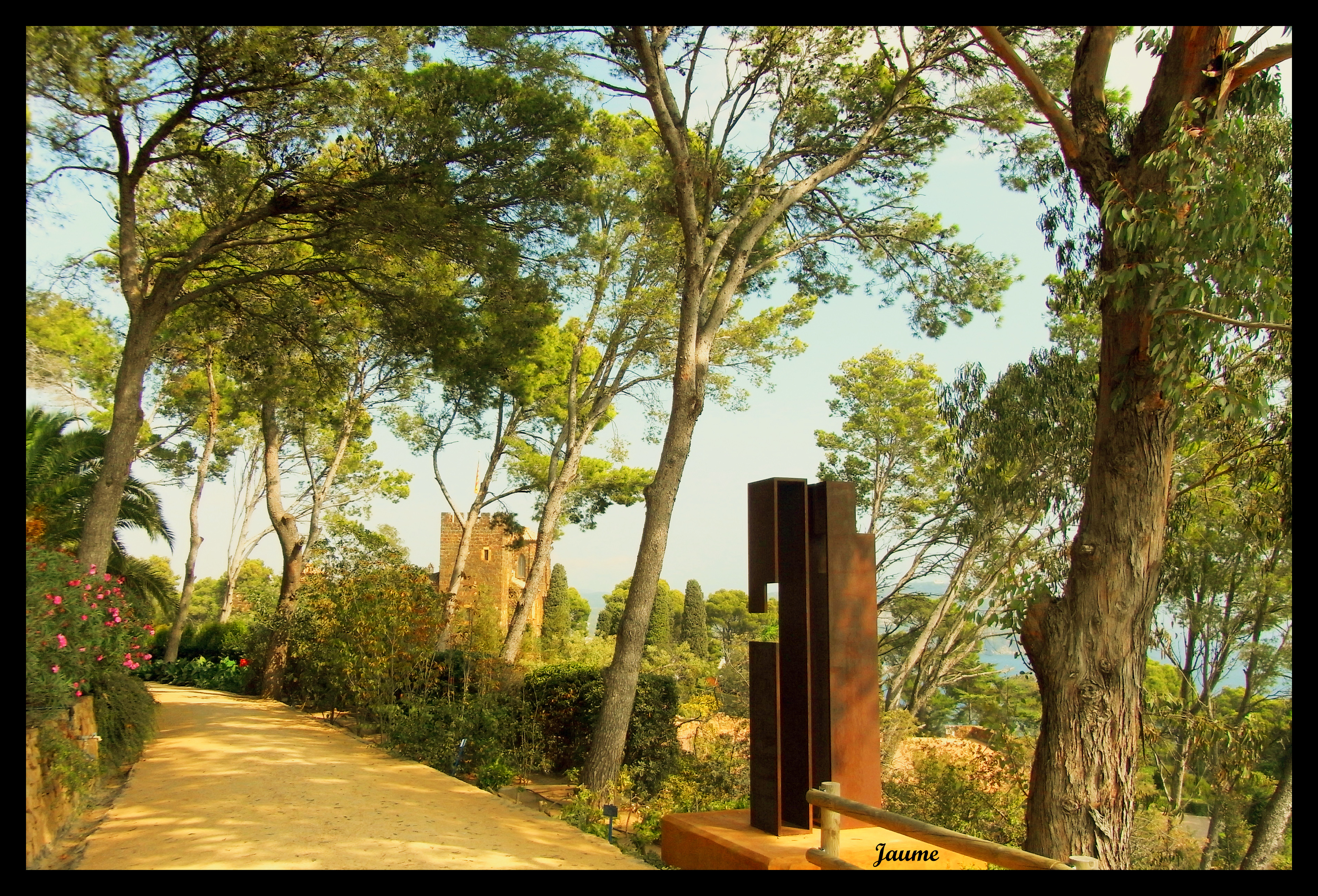
Sculptures in Cap Roig Gardens

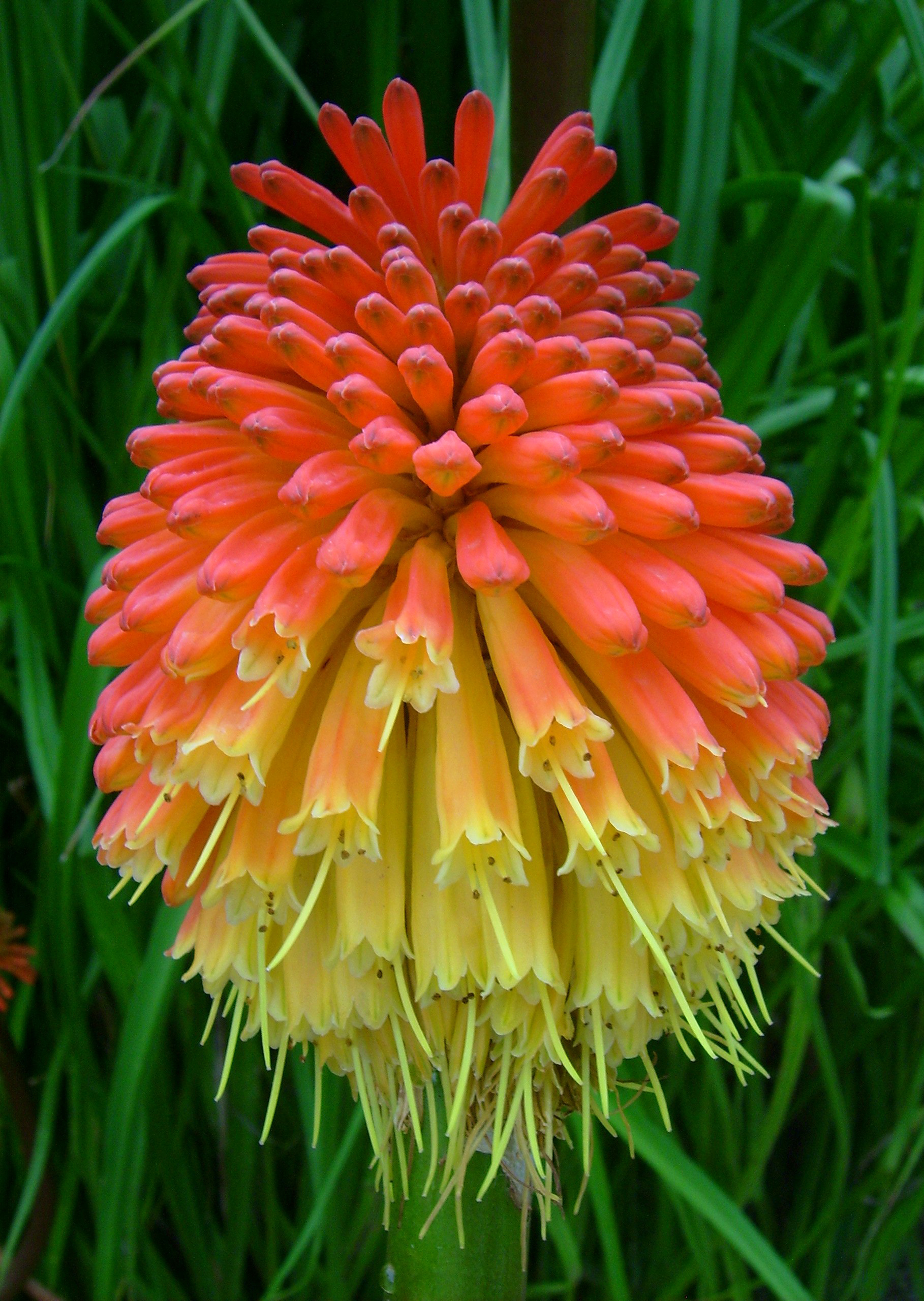
Kniphofia in Marimurtra Botanical Garden

In the four botanical gardens on the Costa Brava come together as many native plants typical of tropical plants, which in turn are balconies overlooking the Mediterranean:

=== Cap Roig Gardens ===
In Calella de Palafrugell (Palafrugell, Baix Empordà), the species most characteristic of the Mediterranean are mixed with trees and plants from five continents in this botanical garden, one of the most varied of Catalonia. During the summer, the botanical garden hosts a variety of activities such as exhibitions and cultural performances.

=== Santa Clotilde Gardens ===
The Santa Clotilde Gardens are in a beautiful landscape on a cliff with views of the sea in Lloret de Mar (Selva). This botanical garden was designed in 1919 by Nicolau Maria Rubió Tudurí, and is characterised by the Italian influence and the formal coherence between the garden and the architectural surroundings. The gardens host several marble sculptures and are characterised by the absence of flowers, contrasting sharply with the wide variety of plants.

=== Pinya de Rosa Tropical Botanical Garden ===
In Blanes (Selva), Ferdinand Rivière Caralt created in 1954 this botanical garden that has the peculiarity of having adapted to the Mediterranean and tropical vegetation characteristics. Plants and trees, such as cactus, Opuntia species or aloes, live in a context rich in native vegetation.

=== Marimurtra Botanical Garden ===
This botanical garden, located in the south-eastern slope of Mount Sant Joan de Blanes, on the cliffs, was created in 1921 by German scientist Karl Faust. Years later, Marimurtra became one of the most important biological stations in the Mediterranean. The Marimurtra Botanical Garden meets not only native plants and trees, but plant species from around the world, such as Chile palms, bamboos and trees characteristic of Africa and Mexico, among others.

== General and cited references ==
- Weston, Roger (20 July 2014). The Handler: A Chuck Brandt Thriller. Weston Publishing Enterprises. p. 146.
