= Rafael Santos Torroella =

Spanish art critic, translator and poet

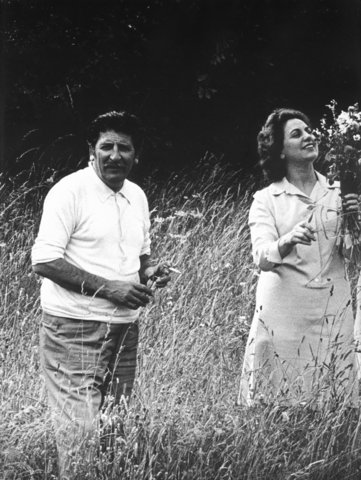
Rafael Santos Torroella and his wife, María Teresa Bermejo

Rafael Santos Torroella (1914, in Portbou – 2002, in Barcelona) was a Spanish art critic, translator and poet.

== Biography ==
Brother of Àngels Santos Torroella, he wrote several books on Joan Miró, Pablo Picasso and Salvador Dalí, among others, and helped renovate the avant-garde art scene in Spain after the Spanish Civil War. Santos published his Antología Poética in 1952. He is considered as a major authority in the artistic universe. His bibliography is very important (references in all important libraries, not only in European countries but all around the world). A lot of books and works, particularly about Miró and Dalí, have really established his fame. But it seems that his life is not very well known.
