= Emilio Sala =

Emilio Sala may refer to:

- Emilio Sala (painter) (1850–1910), Spanish painter
- Emilio Sala (sculptor) (1864–1920), Italian-born Ukrainian sculptor
- Emilio Grau Sala (1911–1975), Catalan painter
