= Ángeles Santos Torroella =

Catalan Spanish surrealist painter

- Self portrait, 1928
- Born: 7 November 1911; Portbou, Spain
- Died: 3 October 2013 (aged 101); Madrid, Spain
- Known for: Painting
- Spouse: Emilio Grau Sala (m. 1936)

Ángeles Santos Torroella (7 November 1911 – 3 October 2013) was a Spanish surrealist painter. Born in Portbou, Catalonia, she was the sister of the poet and art critic Rafael Santos Torroella. She married the painter Emilio Grau Sala. Her son is the painter Juliàn Grau i Santos. In 2003 she received the Gold Medal of Merit in the Fine Arts, awarded by the Ministry of Culture of Spain and in 2005, the Creu de Sant Jordi, awarded by the Government of Catalonia.

== Biography ==
She was introduced to drawing at the Congregation of the Immaculate Conception boarding school in Seville. In 1927, she moved to Valladolid, and there she took private lessons from the Italian painter Cellino Perotti. In 1929 Santos Torroella presented her work Un Mundo (A World) at the Autumn Salon in Madrid. In this city she integrated into intellectual circles and made friends such as Federico García Lorca and Juan Ramón Jiménez. The next year she was given her own room at the exhibition. In 1931 she held a solo exhibit in Paris. In 1932, she participated in the Iberian Artists Collective in Copenhagen and Paris, and the next year was invited to the exhibit at the Carnegie Institute in Pittsburgh (USA). In 1936, she exhibited at the Spanish Pavilion of the Venice Biennale. She exhibited in Barcelona for the first time in 1935, at Syra Galleries.

In 1936, at the outbreak of the Spanish Civil War, Santos Torroella and her husband fled Spain for France. She returned to Spain by herself in 1937. The couple reunited in 1962.

== Work ==
Her early work ranges from expressionism to surrealism, though it later moved into Post-Impressionism, primarily landscape and interiors. Her most renowned painting is a large-format oil called Un mundo, representing a strange surreal planet, which she painted when she was 18 and is currently held at the Museo Nacional Centro de Arte Reina Sofia in Madrid. She was often referred to as a Spanish Rimbaud.

=== Works in museums ===
- Museo Nacional Centro de Arte Reina Sofía, Madrid
- ca:Museu de l'Empordà, Figueres

== Death ==
Santos Torroella died on 3 October 2013, at the age of 101.
