= Sant Pere Pescador =

- Municipality
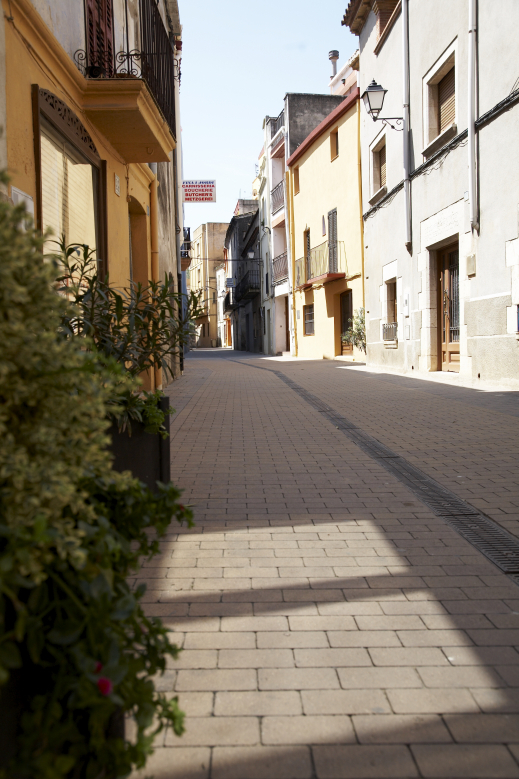
- Old centre

- Coat of arms

- Location in Catalonia Sant Pere Pescador (Spain)
- Coordinates: 42°11′20″N 3°5′0″E
- Country: Spain
- Community: Catalonia
- Province: Girona
- Comarca: Alt Empordà

Government
  - Mayor: Agustí Badosa Figueras (2015)

Area
  - Total: 18.4 km^{2} (7.1 sq mi)

Population (2025-01-01)
  - Total: 2,290
  - Density: 124/km^{2} (322/sq mi)
- Website: santpere.cat

Sant Pere Pescador (Catalan pronunciation: [ˈsam ˈpeɾə pəskəˈðo]) is a municipality in the comarca of Alt Empordà, Girona, Catalonia, Spain, is a small town in the Bay of Roses on the river Fluvià, on the coastline of the Costa Brava.

The town has the benefit of a sandy 7 km long beach. The first reference to the town dates from 974 when it was owned by the monastery of Sant Pere de Rodes part of the County of Empúries. The castle of Sant Pere dates from the 14th century.

The surrounding marshes were drained in the 17th and 18th centuries, making the area an important agricultural centre. There are several orchards in the area. Tourism has become more important. Nearby is the Natural Park Aiguamolls de l’Empordà

== Population ==
The population of Sant Pere Pescador is 37% immigrants, coming mainly from Morocco and non-EU countries (especially Morocco).
