= Sa Riera =

Village in Catalonia, Spain

Coordinates: 41°58′22.94″N 3°12′39.82″E

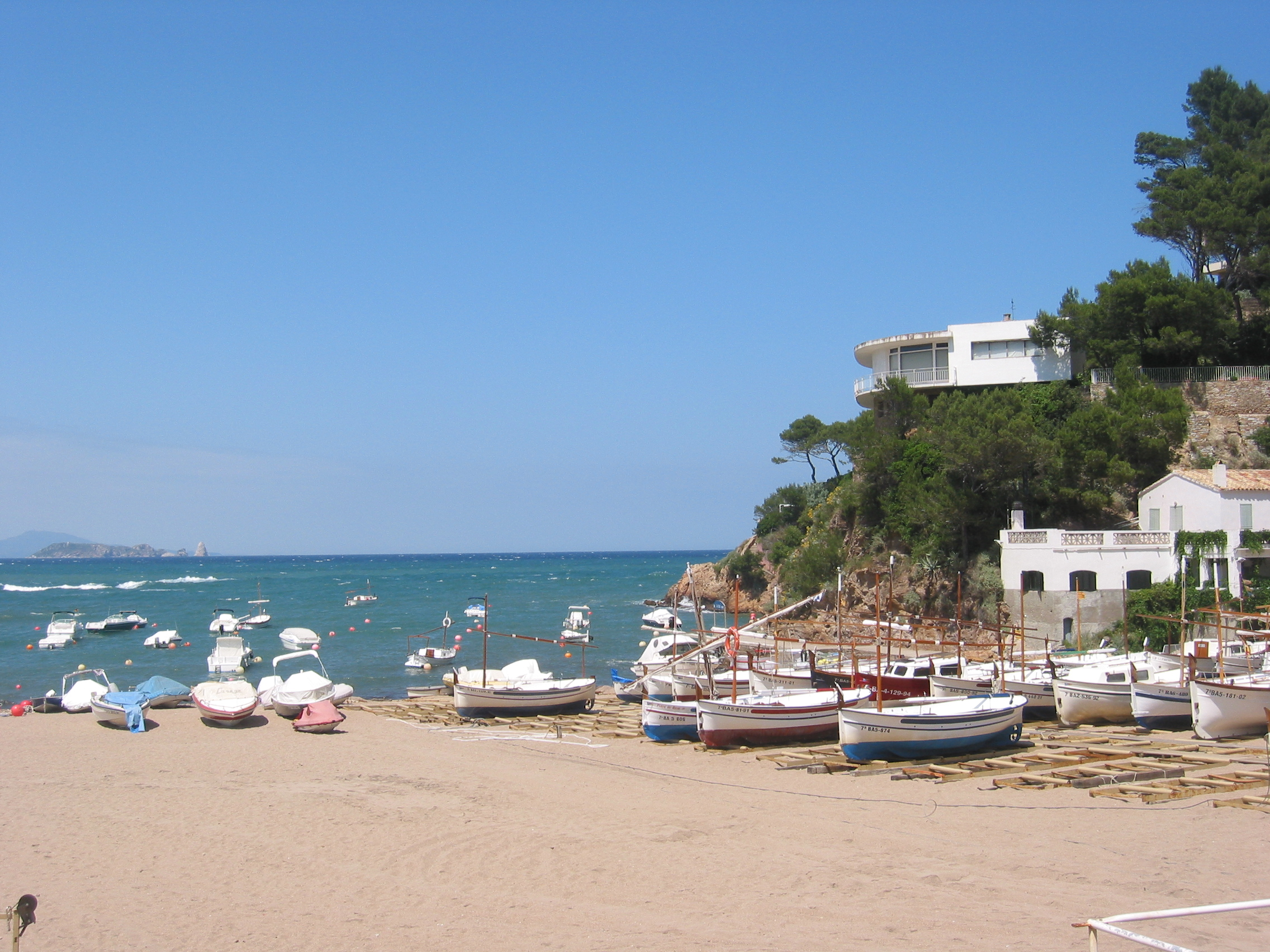
Sa Riera beach

Sa Riera, Catalonia, Spain is a fishing village and holiday resort situated in a bay of the Costa Brava close to the nearby inland towns of Palafrugell and Begur. It can be reached by road from Begur and Pals and there is also a pleasant walk around the cliffs from Platja de Pals, the next resort along the coast.

Sa Riera is typical of the many small coves set amongst rugged pine covered cliffs cascading down to meet the clear waters of the Mediterranean Sea which have made the area north of Palamos and south of L'Estartit famous for its beauty.

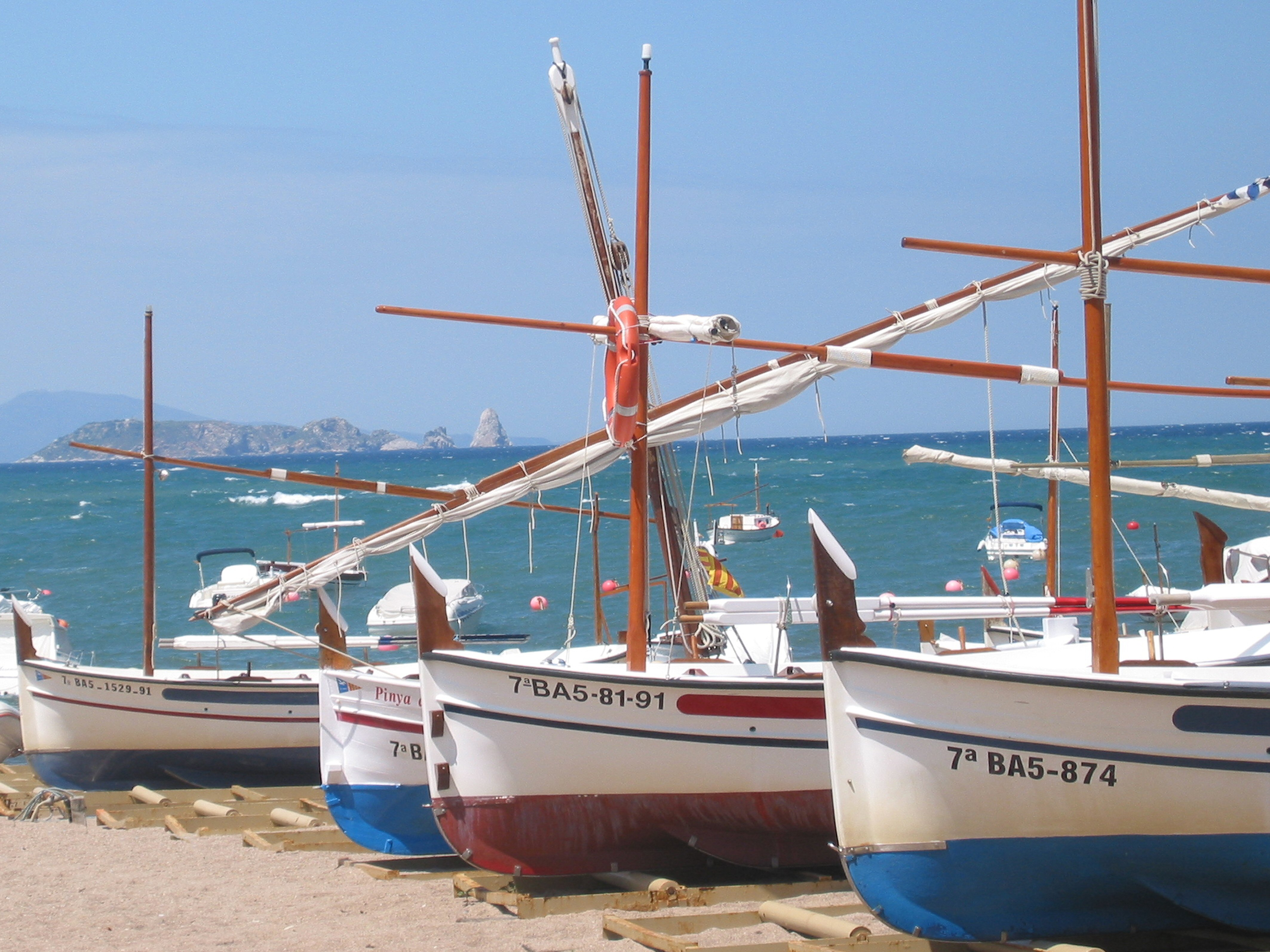
Fishing boats at Sa Riera

Sa Riera has a beach that is sheltered and particularly popular in the summer months.

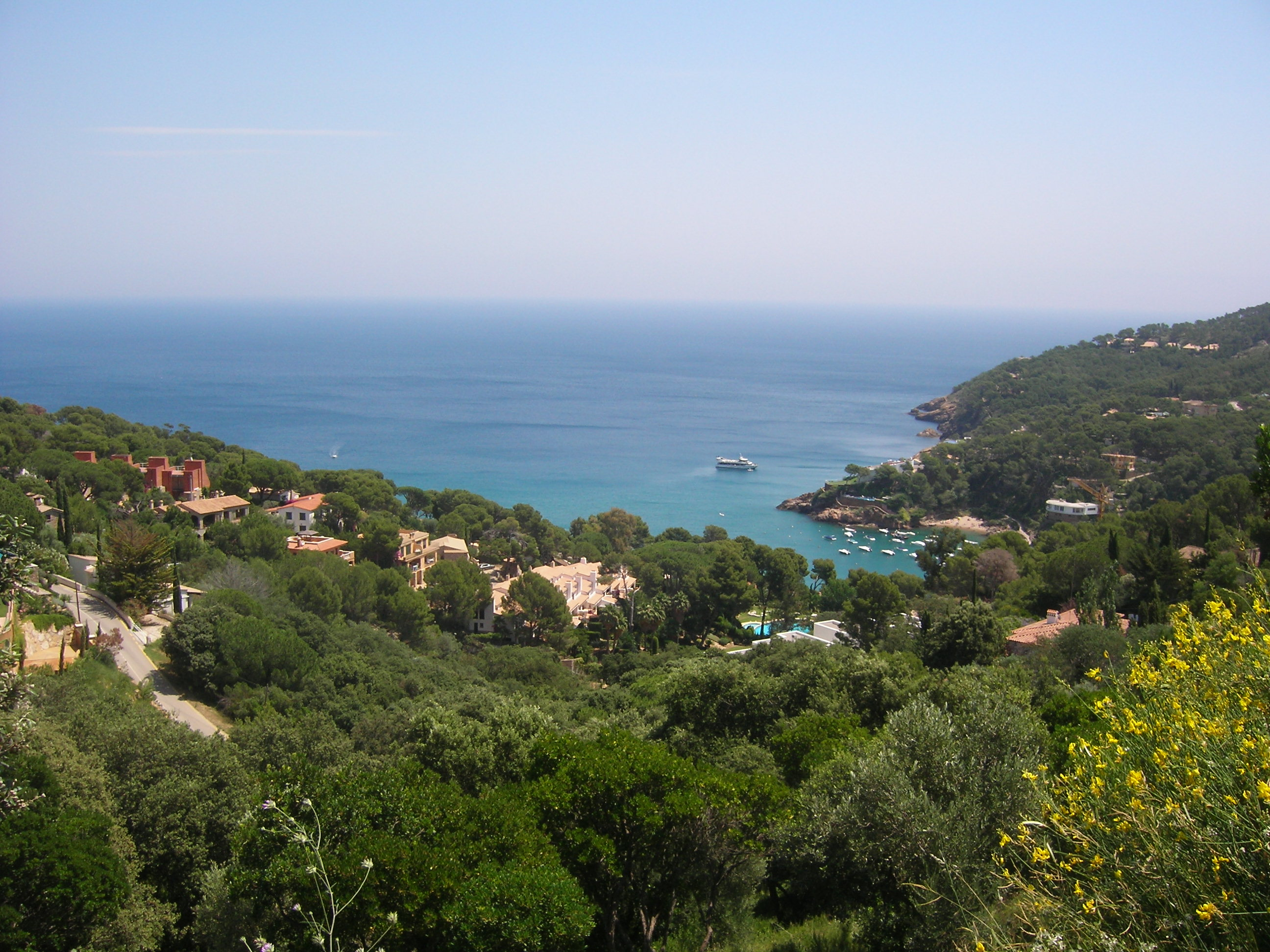
View overlooking Sa Riera
