= Llançà =

- Municipality
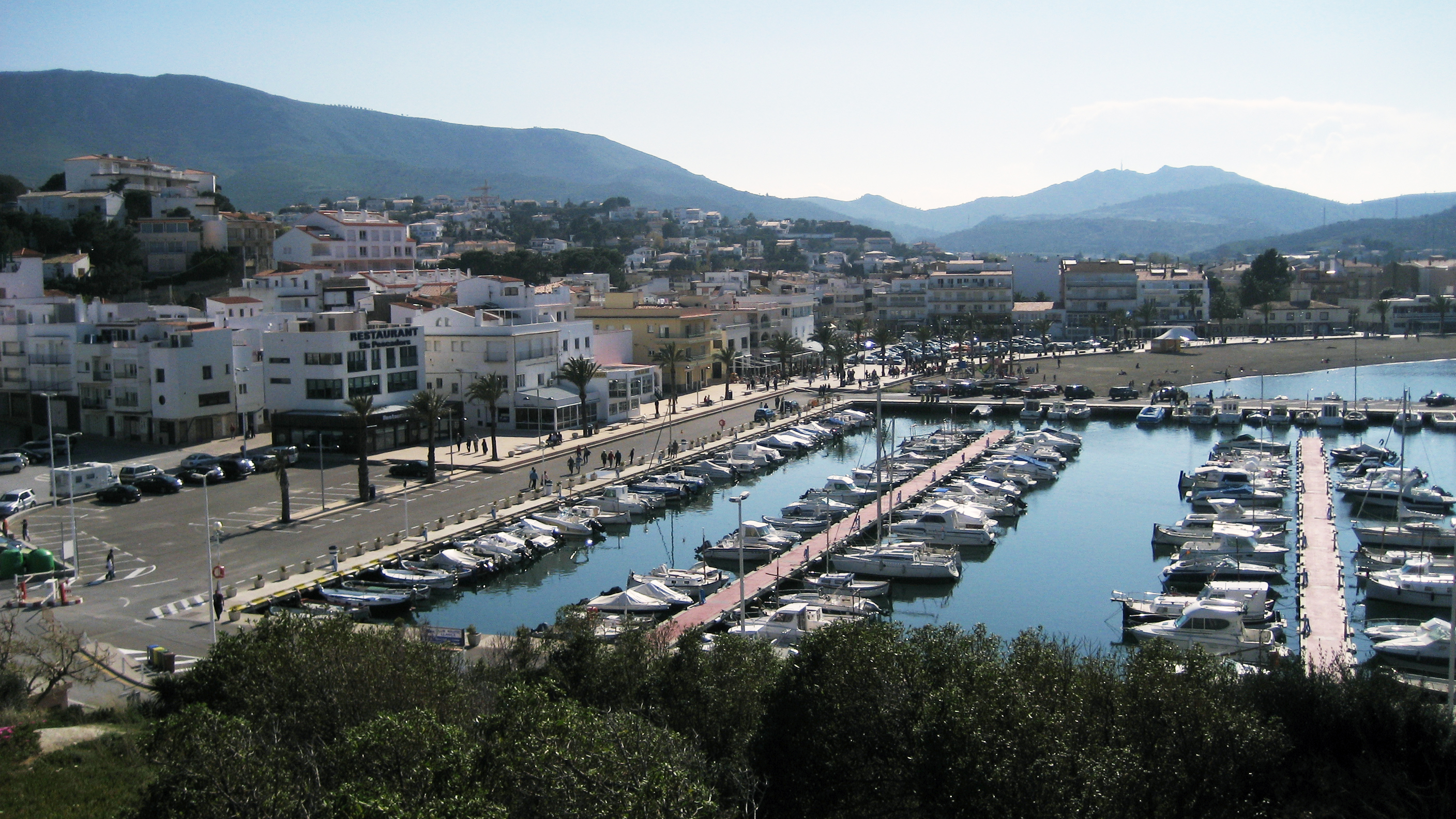

- Flag Coat of arms

- Location in Catalonia Llançà (Spain)
- Coordinates: 42°22′10″N 3°09′40″E
- Country: Spain
- Community: Catalonia
- Province: Girona
- Comarca: Alt Empordà

Government
  - Mayor: Guillem Cusí Batlle (2015)

Area
  - Total: 28.0 km^{2} (10.8 sq mi)
- Elevation: 4 m (13 ft)

Population (2025-01-01)
  - Total: 4,892
  - Density: 175/km^{2} (453/sq mi)
- Demonym(s): Llançanenc, llançanenca
- Website: www.llanca.cat

Llançà (Catalan pronunciation: [ʎənˈsa]) is a municipality in the comarca of the Alt Empordà in Catalonia, Spain. It is situated on the coastline of the Costa Brava, between the Cap de Creus and the French frontier and is an important fishing port and tourist centre. The N-260 connects the town with Figueres and continues on to the border at Portbou.

Llança, seen from the south. The pyramid-shaped mountain in the background is Querroig (altitude 672 metres). It lies on the frontier between Spain and France, above Portbou (not in the picture).

The GR 92 long-distance footpath, which roughly follows the length of the Mediterranean coast of Spain, has a staging point at Llançà. Stage 1 links northwards to Portbou, a distance of 9.8 kilometres (6.1 mi), whilst stage 2 links southwards to Cadaqués, a distance of 20.3 kilometres (12.6 mi).

== Demographics ==
1900	1930	1950	1970	1986	2007
1,829	2,021	1,713	2,682	3,271	4,862
