= Clemente Cerdeira Fernández =

Spanish Arabist and diplomat

- Born: 1887; Portbou (Spain)
- Died: 1947 (aged 59–60); Nice, France
- Education: University of al-Qarawiyyin
- Occupations: Diplomat and Spy
- Years active: 1905-1942

Clemente Cerdeira Fernández (1887–1947) was a Spanish Arabist and diplomat.

== Books ==
- Grammar of Literal Arabic. Part one. (French Press / Catholic Print, 1911)
- Spanish Grammar in the Arabic language (Catholic Press, 1912)
