= Emilio Grau Sala =

Catalan painter

Emilio (Emi) Grau Sala (1911–1975) was a Spanish painter. He studied at the sp:Escuela de Bellas Artes de Barcelona. With his wife Ángeles Santos Torroella he fled to Paris at the outbreak of the Spanish Civil War.

He was a famous colorist (oil painting, watercolor and pastel) and illustrator. In the French Salon "Comparaisons", he was a member of the group of Maurice Boitel.
