= Portbou =

- Municipality
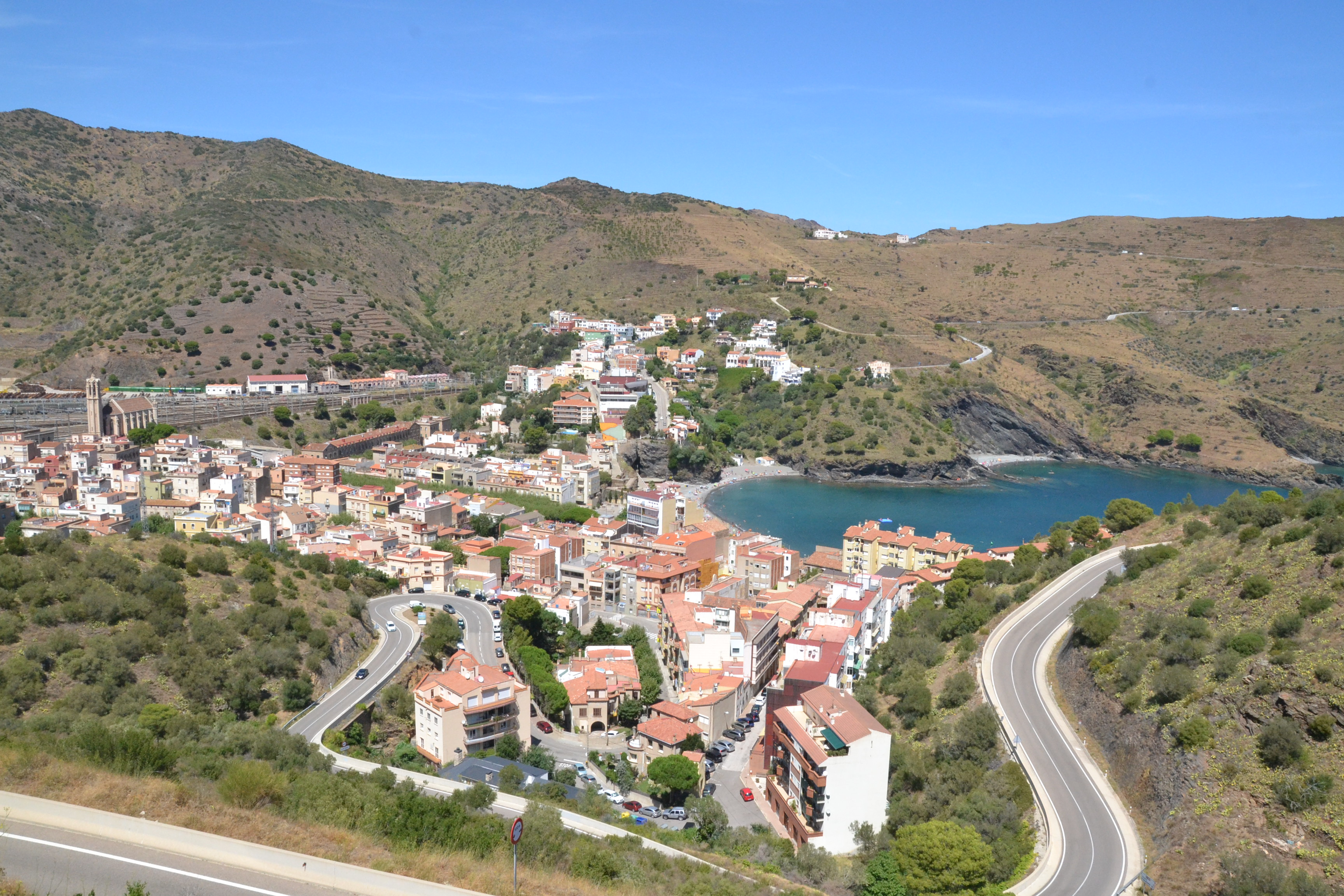

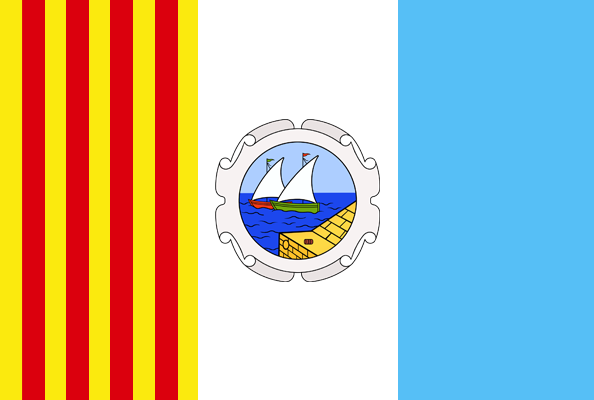
- Flag Coat of arms

- Location in Catalonia Portbou (Catalonia) Portbou (Spain)
- Coordinates: 42°25′37″N 3°09′40″E
- Country: Spain
- Community: Catalonia
- Province: Girona
- Comarca: Alt Empordà

Government
  - Mayor: Trino Martínez (2019)

Area
  - Total: 9.2 km^{2} (3.6 sq mi)
- Elevation: 28 m (92 ft)

Population (2025)
  - Total: 1,131
  - Density: 120/km^{2} (320/sq mi)
- Demonym(s): Portbouenc, portbouenca
- Website: www.portbou.cat

Portbou (Catalan pronunciation: [ˌpɔɾˈβɔw]) is a town in the Alt Empordà county, in the Province of Girona, Catalonia, Spain. As of 2024, it has a population of 1131 people.

Portbou is located near the French border in the Costa Brava region, and frequently serves as a dropping off point for SNCF trains coming from Cerbère in France.

Portbou was a small but important point for the Republicans during the Spanish Civil War, as it was one of the few places from where they could get supplies from abroad.

Portbou is where German Jewish philosopher Walter Benjamin died by suicide, and was buried in 1940. There is a monument in his honor, by Dani Karavan.

== Transport ==
The Portbou railway station is a break-of-gauge station. It contains a major rail freight transfer facility, and a large passenger station built to support customs and immigration. The customs and immigration facilities are no longer required as both France and Spain are Schengen Area members.

A pair of railway tunnels connect Portbou with Cerbère in France. One tunnel contains a standard gauge track, and one an Iberian gauge track. Local Spanish trains either terminate at Portbou or run through to Cerbère, where the Iberian gauge tracks ends, and French trains either terminate at Cerbère or continue to Portbou. Portbou has a Talgo Automatic Track Gauge Changeover System facility, for use by through trains between France and Spain.

The road connection to Cerbère in France is via the Coll dels Balitres (163 m). This route is 7 km (4.3 mi) longer than the rail route (1.8 km (1.1 mi)).

The GR 92 long distance footpath, which roughly follows the length of the Mediterranean coast of Spain, starts at Portbou. Stage 1 links southwards to Llançà, a distance of 9.8 km (6.1 mi).

== Demography ==
1900	1930	1950	1970	1986	2018
2581	3976	2033	2360	2021	1077

== Notable people ==
- Clemente Cerdeira Fernández, (1887–1947), Spanish Arabist and diplomat
- Àngels Santos Torroella, Catalan painter
- Walter Benjamin, committed suicide in Portbou
