= Güell =

River in Catalonia, Spain

Coordinates: 41°59′06″N 2°48′37″E

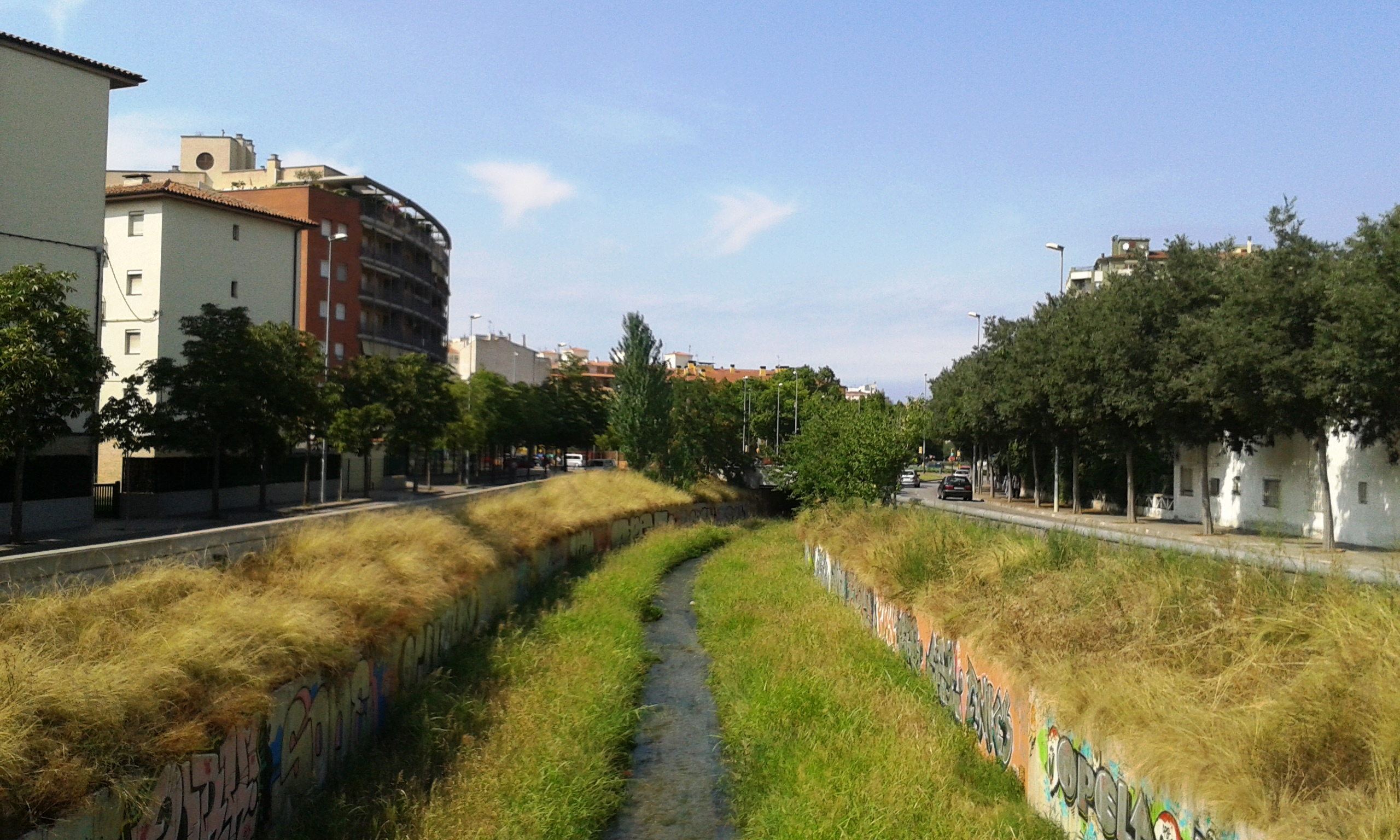
The river Guell as it passes through the neighborhoods of Santa Eugenia

The Güell (Catalan pronunciation: [ˈɡweʎ]) is a river in Catalonia, Spain. It has a length of 1.5 kilometres (0.9 mi) and passes through the city of Girona.
