= List of films shot on the Costa Brava =

Below is an incomplete list of fictional feature films, short films or miniseries that have been filmed in locations of the Costa Brava.

Year	Original Title	Locations	Director / Studios	Country	Actors	Description/Notes
1914	Amor de pescadora o Mercedes, la pescadora o La pescadora de Tossa	Tossa de Mar	José de Togores and Giovanni Doria / Segre Films (Barcelona)	(Spain)	Luis Alcalde, Lola Ojeda, Lola París, Gerardo Peña, Domènec Ceret	A production based on a story by Eduard Marquina
1915	El amor hace justicia	Sant Feliu de Guíxols	Magí Murià / Barcinógrafo (Barcelona)	(Spain)	Margarida Xirgu, Guibernat, Dolors Puchol, Carles Capdevila, Ricardo Puga, Modesto Santaulària	Filmed by Fructuós Gelabert, with the cast of the theatre company run by Margarida Xirgu and Ricard Puga
1916	El secreto del mar	Beach of L'Estartit, Begur, Torroella de Montgrí, Cala Farriola, Aiguablava, Paradís, Fornells, banks of Ter, El Port de la Selva	Josep de Togores and Giovanni Doria / Emporium Films (Barcelona)	(Spain)	Amèlia Grossi, Pere Portes, Geo Boronsky	Drama and adventures based on a plot and script by Josep Massot i Ventós
1917	La herencia del diablo	Tossa de Mar and other locations of the coast	Domènec Ceret and Joan Solà i Mestres / Studio Films (Barcelona)	(Spain)	Lolita París, Tina Jordi, Alberto Martínez, Antoni Casanovas, Assumpció Casals, Juli Nolla	Adventure series (eight episodes)
1921	Lilian	Lloret de Mar	Juan Pallejá / Good Silver Film Corporation (Barcelona)	(Spain)	Inocencia Alcubierre, Juan Pallejá	A drama with Llorenç Bau Bonaplata (whose second surname means good silver in English) and Antoni Cànovas
1926	Entre marinos	Lloret de Mar	Josep G. Barranco and Rafael Roca / Ralph Films (Barcelona)	(Spain)	-	Shot in the company's own studios and laboratory and based on the life of Catalan fishermen on the Costa Brava, with an American couple in the star roles.
1926	Gent i paisatge de Catalunya	Aiguablava, Medes Islands, L'Escala, Castelló d'Empúries, Portbou, Roses, Cadaqués, El Port de la Selva, Llançà	Josep Gaspar / Cinematogràfiques Ginesta (Barcelona)	(Spain)	-	
1927	Baixant de la Font del Gat o La Marieta de l'ull viu	Hostalric and Blanes	Josep Amich and Bert Amichatis / Ediciones J. Alfonso (Barcelona)	(Spain)	Josep Santpere, Jaume Devesa, Marina Torres, Alexandre Nolla, Enric Guitart, Rosita Hernáez, Ricard Alís, Francesc Tressols, Blanquita Muñoz	Based on a plot and script by Amichatis and Gastó A. Màntua, which draws on the popular Catalan song and cartoon. The Catalan language is used for the titles and the sung parts. It was released in Spanish as “La moza del cantar”
1927	Lo más sublime	Tossa de Mar, Lloret de Mar and Blanes	Enrique Ponsá / Producciones ELA (Barcelona)	(Spain)	Mercè Domènech, Valeriano Cortés, Antoni B. de Vila, Antoni Granell, Eduard de C. Tarragó, Enric Filló, Jaume Reixach, Juli Payà, Luisa Vivarelli, Rosita Ponsá	Written, produced and artistically directed by the director himself
1927	La tía Ramona	Sant Feliu de Guíxols and other locations on the Costa Brava	Nick Winter and Francesc Gargallo / Edición Nacional Gaumont (Barcelona)	(Spain)	Ángeles Guart, María Luisa Rodríguez, Josep Acuaviva, Luisa Fernanda Sala, Maria Lluïsa Gargallo, Tomás Cola	Based on a plot by the latter, who also produced the sets
1927	La puntaire	Santa Cristina d'Aro and Lloret de Mar	Josep Claramunt and Fructuós Gelabert	(Spain)	Teresa Pujol, Joan Xuclà, Llorenç Adrià, Joan Formiguera, Teresa Martí, Carme Prats, Llorenç Gibert	Based on the comedy of the same title by Tomàs Ribas i Julià, which was inspired in its turn by the poem by Manuel Ribot i Serra
1930	L'Âge d'Or	Cap de Creus	Luis Buñuel	(Spain)	Gaston Modot, Lya Lys, Caridad de Laberdesque, Max Ernst, Josep Llorens Artigas, Lionel Salem, Germaine Noizet, Duchange	Scripted by the director from the novel of the same title by Pedro Mata, concerning love-affair tangles
1930	Un chien andalou	Costa Brava	Luis Buñuel	(Spain)	Simone Mareuil, Pierre Batcheff, Salvador Dalí, Robert Hommet	The second flagship film from Buñuel, the filmmaker from Calanda, produced by the French viscount and patron Charles de Noailles. Salvador Dalí made a substantial contribution to the script in the form of ideas, this being immediately apparent in the shots, symbolism and metaphors, which feature a strong surreal element. The initial title was “The icy water of egotistical calculation”, an expression borrowed from The Communist Manifesto.
1932	El hombre que se reía del amor	Tossa de Mar	Benito Perojo / Star Film (Barcelona)	(Spain)	Rafael Rivelles, María Fernanda Ladrón de Guevara, Ricardo Núñez, Rosita Díaz Gimeno, Gabriel Algara and Antoñita Colomé	Scripted by the director from the novel of the same title by Pedro Mata, concerning love-affair tangles
1933	El cafè de la Marina	El Port de la Selva	Domènec Pruna / Orphea Film (Barcelona)	(Spain)	Pere Vantaiols (Catalan version), Rafael Rivelles (Spanish version), Gilberta Rougé, Rafael Moragas, Moraguetes, Sebastià Gasch, Paquita Torres, Genoveva Ginestà, Ramon Tort, Teodor Busquets, Ricard Gascon, Rosita de Cabo	Based on the play of the same title by Josep Maria de Sagarra and adapted by the director, who was the brother of Pere Pruna, the latter taking charge of the café sets in which much of the story unfolds. The film was shot alternating Catalan and Spanish, with different actors for each. El Port de la Selva was the setting for much of the filming, particularly the beach and sea scenes with seamen, some of whom were the real thing and acting as extras. It is the first ever commercial film with the dialogue entirely in Catalan
1935	¡Abajo los hombres!	Sant Feliu de Guíxols (Boulevard and around the hermitage of Sant Elm)	Josep Maria Castellví / Ediciones y Distribuciones Cinematográficas, SA (Barcelona)	(Spain)	Pierre Clarel, Carmelita Aubert, Alexandre Nolla, Tina Vidal, Libya Dimas, Samuel Crespo, Agustina Gratacós, Maruja Sanchiz	A musical comedy based on the operetta S.O.S. by Pierre Clarel, adapted for the screen by Valentín R. González
1940	Muñequita	Calella de Palafrugell, Aiguablava and Camprodon	Ramon Quadreny i Orellana / Levante Films (Valencia)	(Spain)	Alfonsina de Saavedra, Rafael Durán, Leonor Fábregas, Francisco de A. Villagómez, Josita Hernán, Pedro Hidalgo, Pere Mascaró, Remée Meléndez, Teresa Molgosa, Luis Rocaberty, Amparo Romo, Amparo Saus, José Torró	Comedy based on the romantic novel of the same title by Rafael Pérez y Pérez. A princess falls in love with a sailor, who turns out to be the heir to a principality
1944	La llamada del mar	Cadaqués, Roses and Palamós	José Millán / Helios Films (Paris)	(France)	Jorge Mistral, Maraly Aloy, Juan Monfort, Ana Morera, César Delgado, Arturo Cámara, Mercedes Fusté, Miguel Garcia	A drama with a seafaring atmosphere. It was shot essentially in Cadaqués (Ció's trap appears – the one she used to bring milk from the Perafita farm to his customers in the village)
1946	Costa Brava o Tormenta de almas	Girona, Lake of Banyoles, Palamós, Calella de Palafrugell, Aiguablava, Sant Feliu de Guíxols, S'Agaró	Julio Fleischner / Concordia Films (Barcelona)	(Spain)	Josep Vivó, Alfonso Muñoz, Sílvia Morgan, Alfonso Cámara, Juan Muñiz	A drama to a script by Ricardo Mazo and Alonso Pesquera
1947	Las tinieblas quedaron atrás	S'Agaró	Miquel Iglesias / Acor (Barcelona)	(Spain)	Rina Celi, Ángel Picazo, Oswaldo Genazzani, José María Lado, Sílvia Morgan	Based on the radio play “Sonrisa de terciopelo” by Lluís G. de Blain
1947	La sirena negra	Coves of Begur and a stately home in the town	Carlos Serrano de Osma / Producciones Boga	(Spain)	Fernando Fernán Gómez, Anita Farra, Ramon Martori, Isabel de Pomés, José María Lado, Maruja Asquerino, Fernando Sancho, Modest Cid	A drama based on the novel by Emilia Pardo Bazán
1948	En un rincón de España	Girona, Tossa de Mar and Tamariu	Jerónimo Mihura / Emisora Films-Procisa (Barcelona)	(Spain)	Adriano Rimoldi, Blanca de Silos, Mery Martin, Carlos Agosti, Juan de Landa, Conrado San Martín, Josep Bruguera, Juan Manuel Soriano, Pepe Isbert	Shot in cinefotocolor and based on a story by Manuel Tamayo, Juli Coll and Joan Lladó
1948	Rostro al mar	Cadaqués	Carlos Serrano de Osma / Titán Films (Barcelona)	(Spain)	Eulàlia Montero, Carlo Tamberlani, Camino Garrigó, Paco Megares, Lili Vicenti, Josep Bruguera, Antonio Bofarull, Fortunato Garcia, Francisco Melgares	Melodrama and maritime adventures ranging between Marseille and the Costa Brava
1948	Mi hija Verónica	Lake of Banyoles and S'Agaró	Enrique Gómez Bascuas / Aureliano Campa-Olimpia (Barcelona)	(Spain)	Margarita Andrey, Fernando Nogueras, Sílvia Morgan, Guillermo Marín, Maruchi Fresno	A drama based on the novel by Elisabeth Mulder
1951	Pandora and the Flying Dutchman	Tossa de Mar (beaches of Platja Gran, Vila Vella, Mar Menuda, Es Codolar, and church and Tower of Homage), Girona (bullring), Palamós (beach of Castell), Castell-Platja d'Aro and S'Agaró	Albert Lewin / Romulus Film (USA)	(United States)	Ava Gardner, James Mason, Nigel Patrick, Sheila Sim, Harold Warrender, Mario Cabré, Marius Goring	That was filmed exclusively on the Costa Brava. This shooting also brought over Frank Sinatra himself, jealous at the relationship that was rumored to have arisen between the star and the bullfighter Mario Cabré
1951	Niebla y sol	Aiguablava	José María Forqué / Producciones Ariel	(Spain)	The ballet of Antonio and Rosario, Carlos Muñoz, Asunción Sancho, José María Mompín, Paco Melgares, María Dolores Pradera and the ballet of Sacha Goudine	A tragedy based on the play “El infierno frío” by Horacio Ruiz de la Fuente, adapted by the film's director and Pere Lazaga
1952	Decameron Nights	Beach of Sant Francesc, Blanes	Hugo Fregonese / Gate Studios (Hertfordshire)	(United Kingdom)	Joan Fontaine, Louis Jourdan, Godfrey Tearle, Joan Collins, Binnie Barnes, Meinhart Maur	An English production recounting various stories of gallantry by Bocaccio, the caravels originally built for the film Alba de América (1951, Juan de Orduña) were taken there from Barcelona
1953	Hochzeit auf Reisen	Tossa de Mar, Sant Feliu de Guíxols and S'Agaró	Paul Verhoeven and Erich Morawsky	(Spain) (Germany)	Ilse Bally, Karlheinz Böhm, Gert Fröbe, Gardy Granass, Walter Gross	A joint production with Germany
1953	La hija del mar	Cadaqués and El Port de la Selva	Antoni Momplet / IFISA (Barcelona)	(Spain)	Virgílio Teixeira, Isabel de Castro, Manuel Luna, Carlos Otero, Juny Orly, Mercè de la Aldea, Jesús Colomer, Emilio Fábregas, Luis Induni	Based on the text of the same title by Àngel Guimerà
1954	Contraband Spain	Blanes	Lawrence Huntington and Juli Salvador / Balcazar Producciones Cinematográficas (Barcelona) and Diadem Films (California)	(Spain) (United States)	Richard Greene, Anouk Aimée, José Nieto, Alfonso Estela, Conrado San Martín, Antonio Amorós, Michael Denison, John Warwick, Philip Saville	A spy crime film
1954	Mr. Arkadin (Confidential Report)	Sant Feliu de Guíxols: S'Agaró, Hostal de La Gavina, the loggia and cliffs environments	Orson Welles	(Spain) (France) (Switzerland)	Paola Mori, Robert Arden, Amparo Rivelles, Mischa Auer, Katina Paxinou, Michael Redgrave, Patricia Medina, Akim Tamiroff	A co-production between Spain, Switzerland and France
1956	Rapsodia de sangre	Girona (La Devesa) and L'Escala	Antonio Isasi-Isasmendi, (Barcelona)	(Spain)	Vicente Parra, Maria Rosa Salgado, Albert Helm, Lidia Baarova, Tomás Blanco, Jesús Colomer, Margarita Lozano, Carles Lloret	Hungary after the Soviet invasion
1956	The Spanish Gardener	Palamós: La Planassa before the port, Ribera modernist house and beach of Castell; Sant Feliu de Guíxols: arch of Sant Benet, Monticalvari, Can Ribot, in Boulevard of Mar and S'Agaró; Tossa de Mar; Gavarres; Girona: Stone Bridge (Pont de Pedra); Camprodon	Philip Leacock / Pinewood Studios (Buckinghamshire)	(United Kingdom)	Dirk Bogarde, Jon Whiteley, Michael Hordern, Cyril Cusack, Maureen Swanson, Lyndon Brook, Josephine Griffin, Bernard Lee	Based on the novel by A. J. Cronin
1956	Juanillo, papá y mamá	Arbúcies (castle, La Capella square, waterfall of La Dona d’Aigua, field of Fogueres, etc.), Camprodon and Llagostera	Juli Salvador and Joan Alberto i Soler	(Spain)	Conrado San Martín, Lina Rosales, Josep Goula, Carmen Pardo, Jaime Avellán, Julia Caba Alba, Joan Capri, Carmen López Lagar, Miguel Ángel Rodríguez	A “film starring a child”
1958	Su desconsolada esposa	Calella de Palafrugell, Palamós and Sant Feliu de Guíxols (beach of Sa Conca)	Miquel Iglesias / Concha Films (Barcelona)	(Spain)	Conrado San Martín, Conchita Ortiz, Michelle Cardy, Antonio Almorós, Marta Padován, Paco Martínez Soria, Jesús Colomer	A variety film written for the theatre by Antonio Paso and Salvador Martínez Cuenca
1958	Spanish Affair	Tossa de Mar	Don Siegel / co-production by CEA, Benito Perojo (Madrid) and Nomad (USA)	(Spain) (United States)	Richard Kiley, Carmen Sevilla, José Guardiola, José Nieto, Julio Peña, Jesús Tordesillas, Purita Vargas	In it, a flamboyant Yankee architect passing through Spain falls in love with a popular Spanish beauty
1958	Accusa del passato	Lloret de Mar	Lionello De Felice	(Spain) (Italy)	Alberto Closas, Luz Márquez, Gino Cervi, Rafael Durán, Lina Rosales, Maria Garcia Alonso, Luis Peña	Une coproduction entre Espagnols et Italiens
1957	Chase a Crooked Shadow	Tamariu, Palamós (Ribera modernist house), Sant Antoni de Calonge, S'Agaró and road Sant Feliu de Guíxols to Tossa de Mar	Michael Anderson, Douglas Fairbanks Jr.	(United States)	Richard Todd, Anne Baxter, Herbert Lom, Faith Brook, Alexander Knox, Alan Tilvern	Melodrama with suspense
1958	Un vaso de whisky	Castelló d’Empúries (Hotel Empúries), L'Escala and surrounding area	Juli Coll / Este Films and PEFSA (Barcelona)	(Spain)	Arturo Fernández, Rossana Podestà, Yelena Samarina, Carlos Larrañaga, Carlos Mendi, Armand Moreno, Jorge Rigaud	A crime-genre production with a script by the director working with José Germán Huici
1958	Ooh... diese Ferien	Sant Feliu de Guíxols (Casino dels Nois)	Franz Antel / Cosmos-Film	(Germany)	Heidi Brühl, Georg Thomalla, Hans Moser, Hannelore Bollmann, Mara Lane, Michael Cramer, C.W. Fernbach, Rolf Olsen, Elke Aberle, Ossi Wanka	A German comedy written by John Andersen
1958	Sea Fury	Begur (castle and church of San Ramon), beach of L’Estartit, and L'Escala	Cyril R. Endfield	(United Kingdom)	Stanley Baker, Victor McLaglen, Luciana Paluzzi, Grégoire Aslan, Francis de Wolff	An English production
1958	The Seventh Voyage of Sinbad	Sa Conca beach of Sant Feliu de Guíxols	Nathan Juran, Morningside / Columbia	(United States)	Kerwin Mathews, Kathryn Grant, Richard Eyer, Alec Mango, Torin Thatcher, Danny Green	A fantasy-adventure film
1958	Ana dice sí	Castell-Platja d'Aro, Sant Feliu de Guíxols, S'Agaró (coasted road and Hostal de la Gavina), Tossa de Mar, Calella de Palafrugell and Llafranc (lighthouse of Sant Sebastià)	Pedro Lazaga	(Spain)	Fernando Fernán-Gómez, Analía Gadé, Elisa Montés, Antonio Ozores, Laura Valenzuela, Lucía Prado, Félix Fernández, Xan das Bolas	
1959	Suddenly, Last Summer	Sant Feliu de Guíxols, beach of Sant Pol, beach of S'Agaró, Sant Antoni de Calonge, Pals and Begur	Joseph L. Mankiewicz / Columbia Pictures	(United States)	Elizabeth Taylor, Montgomery Clift, Katharine Hepburn, Albert Dekker, Mercedes McCambridge, Gary Raymond, Joan Young	A melodrama film, based on the play by Tennessee Williams. The shooting made a big impact while it was in progress on the Costa Brava, thanks in particular to the big-name stars
1960	Crimen para recién casados	Calella de Palafrugell, Palamós and Sant Feliu de Guíxols	Pedro Luis Ramírez	(Spain)	Fernando Fernán-Gómez, Concha Velasco, Roberto Rey, Raúl Cancio, José Calvo, José María Caffarel, Agustín González, Manolo Gómez Bur	
1960	The 3 Worlds of Gulliver	Beach of Sa Conca in Sant Feliu de Guíxols	Jack Sher / Columbia Pictures	(United States)	Kerwin Mathews, Jo Morrow, June Thorburn, Lee Patterson, Grégoire Aslan, Basil Sydney, Charles Lloyd-Pack, Martin Benson	Based on a novel of the same title by Jonathan Swift
1961	Mysterious Island	Beach of Sa Conca, turned into a tropical island. In Sant Feliu de Guixols, a boat and a cave in the old football field	Cy Endfield / Columbia Pictures	(United States)	Michael Craig, Herbert Lom, Joan Greenwood, Gary Merrill, Michael Callan, Beth Rogan, Percy Herbert, Dan Jackson	Based on a novel of the same title by Jules Verne
1961	El último verano	Tossa de Mar, Sant Feliu de Guíxols, Palamós, cove Estreta of Calella de Palafrugell, Tamariu	Juan Bosch / Este Films (Barcelona)	(Spain)	María Asquerino, Roberto Camardiel, Arturo Fernández, Micaela Flores Amaya La Chunga, Jorge Rigaud, Jeanne Valérie	
1961	Julia y el celacanto	Lloret de Mar	Antonio Momplet	(Spain)	Alberto Berco, Carlos Casaravilla, María Belén Fernández, Lill Larsson, Tony Leblanc, Matilde Muñoz Sampedro, Virgílio Teixeira, Concha Velasco	
1962	Dos años de vacaciones	Sa Conca and port of Sant Feliu de Guíxols	Emilio Gómez Muriel / co-production Juan de Orduña (Madrid) and Mexico	(Spain) (Mexico)	Pablito Calvo, Alejandro Ciangherotti, José Moreno, Charito Maldonado, Antonio Vela, Paquita Vilanova, Juan Monfort	
1963	Sol de verano	Aiguablava, Hotel Llafranc, Calella de Palafrugell, cove S'Alguer of Palamós, Lloret de Mar, Tossa de Mar, Sant Feliu de Guíxols	Juan Bosch / Ízaro Films (Barcelona)	(Spain)	Rafael Alonso, Arturo Fernández, Patricia Luján, Marcos Martí, Luz Márquez, José Sancho, Rosanna Yanni	A variety film written by its director and Ángel G. Gauna
1964	Los felices 60	Cadaqués, El Port de la Selva, Sant Pere de Rodes	Jaime Camino / Tibidabo Films (Barcelona)	(Spain)	brothers Cobos, Margarita Lozano, Yelena Samarina	Melodrama
1964	Los pianos mecánicos	Cadaqués and surrounding area	Juan Antonio Bardem / Cesáreo González (Madrid)	(Spain) (France) (Italy)	Melina Mercouri, James Mason, Hardy Krüger, Didier Haudepin, Renaud Verley, Sophie Darès, Keiko Kishi, Maurice Teynac, Karin Mossberg, José María Mompín, Luis Induni, Rafael Luis Calvo, Jaumet Faixó	Based on a novel of the same title by Henri-François Rey
1964	La barca sin pescador	Cadaqués, El Port de la Selva and Sant Pere de Rodes	José María Forn / Tibidabo Films (Barcelona)	(Spain)	Manuel Bronchud, Mario Bustos, Florencio Calpe, Rafael Luis Calvo, José María Cases, Carmen Correa, Ramón E. Goicoechea, Miguel Graneri, Guillermo Hidalgo, Mabel Karr, Gérard Landry, Antonio Lizondo, Ángel Lombarte	A melodrama, based on the play of the same title by Alejandro Casona
1965	Muerte en primavera	Former local Madame Zozo in Mont-ras, beach of Castell, Albert Puig i Palau residence, and beach of La Fosca, in Palamós	Miguel Iglesias / Urania Films (Barcelona)	(Spain)	Luis Induni, Carlos Lemos, Patricia Loran, Paco Morán, Óscar Pellicer, Mónica Randall, Yelena Samarina, Carlos Miguel Solá	With dialogues by the playwright Jaume Salom
1965	Et demain?	Palamós, Palafrugell (Formigues Islands and Calella de Palafrugell), Castell-Platja d'Aro, Sant Feliu de Guíxols, Pals, Begur, La Bisbal d'Empordà	Angela and Émile Degelin / Delta Film (Barcelona)	(Belgium)	Jacques Dufilho and amateur actors Catalan theater	
1966	Su nombre es Daphne	Calella de Palafrugell and Llafranc	Germán Lorente	(Spain)	José Antonio Amor, Joaquín Díaz, Geneviève Grad, Patricia Loran	Melodrama
1967	Ditirambo	Palamós: pier, beach of Castell, La Fosca and Albert Puig i Palau residence	Gonzalo Suárez	(Spain)	Gonzalo Suárez, Yelena Samarina, José Maria Prada, Charo López, Dalmás, Bill Dyckes, collaboration Helenio Herrera, André Courrèges, Lou Bennett, Luis Ciges	A film d'auteur, to such an extent that the director also plays one of the parts
1968	En Baldiri de la costa	Santa Cristina d'Aro, Sant Feliu de Guíxols, beach of La Fosca, Amer, Castell-Platja d'Aro, Vidreres, Arbúcies	José María Font-Espina / Isasi, PC (Barcelona)	(Spain)	Joan Capri, Alicia Tomás, Pilar Velázquez, Carlos Saldaña "Alady", María Matilde Almendros, Enric Navarro, Luis Ciges, Montserrat Julió, Juan Fernández, Angel Álvarez, José Serrat, Isidro Novellas, Leonor Tomás, Francisco Vilardaga	Drawing on the play of the same title by Joaquim Muntañola. It deals with the flood of tourists and the building fever that hit the Costa Brava in the early years of the boom. The script is by Antonio Isasi-Isasmendi and the director, Paco Pérez-Dolz and José María Ricarte, the latter two also being behind “A tiro limpio” (1963). The film's main attraction lies in its star, Joan Capri, taking the role of Baldiri, written specifically for him, at the time when his popularity on Catalan stages was at its peak
1968	Un diablo bajo la almohada	Castell-Platja d'Aro	José María Forqué	(Spain) (France) (Italy)	Ingrid Thulin, Maurice Ronet, Vicente Bañó, Agustín Bescos, Ana Carvajal, Albert Chazel, José Luis Coll, Anne Doat, Enrique Echevarría, Gabriele Ferzetti, Víctor Israel	A comedy film, it is an adaptation of “El curioso impertinente” by Miguel de Cervantes, with a script by Jaime de Armiñán (Madrid)
1968	La dinamita está servida	Cap Sa Sal of Begur, S'Agaró, Hostal de la Gavina	Fernando Merino / Ágata Films (Madrid)	(Spain)	Tony Leblanc, Alfredo Landa, Manuel Gómez Bur, Laura Valenzuela, Rafael Alonso, María Silva, Francisco Piquer, Charles Stalnaker, Tomás Blanco, Chris Huerta, Fernando Sánchez Polack, Julia María Tiedra, Juan Antonio Arévalo, Guillermo Lanaro, Antonio Martín, Noel Claraso, Eric Chapman	A comedy film with a script by Noel Clarasó
1968	Le Paria	Sant Feliu de Guíxols	Claude Carliez	(Spain) (France)	Jean Marais, Nieves Navarro, Marie-José Nat, Horst Frank, José Castillo Escalona	A crime film
1968	Paraules d'amor	Calella de Palafrugell	Antoni Ribas / PC Balcázar (Barcelona)	(Spain) (France)	Joan Manuel Serrat, Serena Vergano, Emilio Gutiérrez Caba, Maria José Goyanes, Manuel Galiana, Cristina Galbó, Paloma Uriarte, Tete Montoliu	Based on a Catalan-language novel by Jaume Picas, with a script by Terenci Moix and a song by Joan Manuel Serrat
1968	Después del diluvio	Platja d'Aro (Tiffany's nightclub), Santa Cristina d'Aro and burned parts of Gavarres	Jacint Esteva Grewe / Filmscontacto (Barcelona)	(Spain)	Mijanou Bardot, Francisco Rabal, Luis Ciges	
1968	Some Girls Do	S'Agaró, Castell-Platja d'Aro, Tamariu, Calella de Palafrugell, beaches of Begur	Ralph Thomas / Great Britain's Rank Organisation Film Production	(United Kingdom)	Richard Johnson, Daliah Lavi, Beba Lončar, James Villiers, Vanessa Howard, Maurice Denham, Sydne Rome, Robert Morley	Action film
1968	Le malizie di Venere	Road to Tossa de Mar	Massimo Dallamano	(Italy) (Germany)	Laura Antonelli, Régis Vallée, Loren Ewing, Renate Kasché, Werner Pochath, Mady Rahl, Wolf Ackva, Peter Heeg, Josil Raquel	It is an adaptation of the famous text of the same title by Sacher-Masoch.
1968	El extraño caso del doctor Fausto	Beach of Castell, Albert Puig i Palau mansion and beach of La Fosca, in Palamós	Gonzalo Suárez / Hersua Interfilms	(Spain)	Gonzalo Suárez, Alberto Puig, Olga Vidali, Gila Hodgkinson, José Arranz, Teresa Gimpera, Emma Cohen, Charo López	Another personal work from this author, which he produced himself
1970	Cabeças cortadas	Castelló d'Empúries, Sant Pere de Rodes, cove Jonquet, Portlligat, Cap de Creus, Cadaqués	Glauber Rocha	(Spain) (Brazil)	Francisco Rabal, Pierre Clémenti, Víctor Israel, Emma Cohen, Luis Ciges, Manuel Esteban, Rosa Maria Penna	Written by its producer
1970	The Light at the Edge of the World	Cap de Creus, Cadaqués	Kevin Billington / Jet Films (Barcelona)	(Spain) (United Kingdom)	Kirk Douglas, Yul Brynner, Samantha Eggar, Fernando Rey, Renato Salvatori, Jean-Claude Drouot, Massimo Ranieri	Produced in English and featuring international stars such as Kirk Douglas (who also participated in the production work). The lighthouse is known locally as “the light of the edge of the world”
1971	In the Eye of the Hurricane	Calonge, cove Gogó, Castell-Platja d'Aro, Sant Feliu de Guíxols	José María Forqué / Orfeo, PC and Arvo Film	(Spain) (Italy)	Jean Sorel, Analía Gadé, Maurizio Bonuglia, Rosanna Yanni, Tony Kendall, Pilar Gómez Ferrer, Julio Peña	
1971	Nicholas and Alexandra	Sant Feliu de Guíxols: S'Agaró, Senya Blanca Gardens and Hostal de la Gavina, become Livadija residence in Crimea; beach of Sa Conca	Franklin J. Schaffner / Horizon Pictures	(United Kingdom)	Michael Jayston, Janet Suzman, Tom Baker, Laurence Olivier, Michael Redgrave, Michael Bryant, Brian Cox, James Hazeldine, Fiona Fullerton, Harry Andrews, Ania Marson, Lynne Frederick, Candace Glendenning, Jaime de Mora y Aragón	Historical film
1972	Los farsantes del amor	Roses	Joan Xiol / Films Canigó and Eurocine	(Spain) (France)	Lynn Enderson, Ramon Pons, Olivier Mathot, Maite Carbonell, Monique Foskolos	Melodrama written by the director himself
1972	Morbo	Castell-Platja d'Aro and surroundings area of Santa Cristina d'Aro, Bell-lloc d'Aro	Gonzalo Suárez / Bocaccio Films (Barcelona)	(Spain)	Ana Belén, Víctor Manuel, Michael J. Pollard, María Vico	Based on a story by its director
1972	Busco tonta para fin de semana	Areas of the Costa Brava	Ignacio F. Iquino / IFISA (Barcelona)	(Spain)	Casto Sendra "Cassen", Isabel Garcés, Santi Sans, Mirta Miller, Fanny Grey, Sílvia Solar	Drawing its inspiration from a comedy he had written with Francisco Prada, and with a script produced in conjunction with Jackie Kelly, his partner
1972	Erotic Family	Lloret de Mar and interiors of a house in Roca Grossa	Mario Siciliano / Films d'Ara (Barcelona), the Italian Medeus Film, SVL, and Llorca Films (Lloret de Mar)	(Spain) (Italy)	Raquel Evans, Alfonso del Real, Karin Well, Giorgio Ardisson, Berta Cabré, Eva Lyberten, Antonio Campa	Through this film, its producer gained a reputation for having pioneered S-rated films in Spain
1975	La noche de las gaviotas	Beaches of Empúries	Amando de Ossorio	(Spain)	Maria Kosti, Víctor Petit, Sandra Mozarowsky, José Antonio Calvo, Susana Estrada	Fourth movie in the series of Templar zombie
1976	Una loca extravagancia sexy	Nightclub La Reoca of Lloret de Mar	Enrique Guevara	(Spain)	Mireia Ros, Ángel Pavlovsky, Raquel Evans, Paule Bertrac, Tifanny & John	Isidor Llorca's second S-rated production, featuring the debut of the lady who was to go on to become the well-known actress and director Mireia Ros (real name: Lídia Senties i Tamborero; first feature film: La Monyos, 1995-1996). The film also features the great stand-up comedian who has rarely been involved in the cinema, Ángel Pavlovsky
1977	Borrasca	Torroella de Montgrí and Pals	Miguel Ángel Rivas / Arte 7	(Spain)	María Luisa San José, Antonio Ferrandis, Queta Claver, Héctor Alterio, Teresa Gimpera, Alfredo Landa, Verónica Miriel, Marta Flores	A drama written by its director and by Milagros Fernández and Rafael Feo
1977	Valentino	Sant Feliu de Guíxols: beach of Sant Pol, S'Agaró and the village church	Ken Russell / Arte 7	(United States)	Rudolf Nureyev, Leslie Caron, Michelle Phillips, Carol Kane, Felicity Kendal, Seymour Cassel, Huntz Hall, Alfred Marks, David de Keyser, Linda Thorson, Leland Palmer, Lindsay Kemp, Peter Vaughan, Anthony Dowell, Penelope Milford	Starring the great ballet dancer Rudolf Nureyev, recounting the life of Rodolfo Valentino
1977	Jill	Lloret de Mar: Canaletes old square, bar Marina, nightclub Rosamar, Sa Caleta and interiors of Nova Ràdio Lloret	Enrique Guevara	(Spain)	Mireia Ross, Raquel Evans, Lynn Endersson, Maximo Valverde, Daniel Martin, Emma Cohen, Jaime Mir, Paul Bertrac, Alessandro Ricci, Ricard Reguant, Jordi Sentis, Alfredo Álvarez, Africa Mir, Pilar Losada, Manolo Castan	A production “for over-eighteens”, written by its director and the novelist Andreu Martín
1977	Io sono mia	Calella de Palafrugell	Sofia Scandurra	(Spain) (Italy) (Germany)	Stefania Sandrelli, Maria Schneider, Michel Placido, Rafael Machado, Paco Rabal, Anton Diffring	Based on the novel Donna in Guerra, by Dacia Maraini
1977	Les routes du sud	Hospital Torroella de Montgrí, Calella de Palafrugell: Can Batlle, les Voltes, beach of Port Bo	Joseph Losey / Profilmes (Barcelona)	(Spain) (France)	Yves Montand, José Luis Gómez, Miou-Miou, France Lambiotte, Jeannine Mestre, Laurent Malet, Frances Vicens	With a script by Jorge Semprún
1977	¿Y ahora qué, señor fiscal?	Blanes	León Klimovsky / IFISA (Barcelona) and Pelimex (Mexico)	(Spain) (Mexico)	Valentín Trujillo, Verónica Miriel, Sílvia Solar, Ricard Massip, Joan Borràs, Sílvia Aguilar, Eva Lyberten, Ignacio López Tarso	Based on the novel by José Luis Martín Vigil
1978	Sensività	Pals, Regencós, Palamós (pub El Castellet), Romanyà de la Selva, Sant Feliu de Guíxols, Santa Cristina d'Aro, Solius (Mas Dalmau), Tossa de Mar	Enzo R. Castellari / Este Films (Barcelona)	(Spain) (Italy)	Patricia Adriani, Vincent Gardenia, Antonio Mayans, Leonora Fani, Marta Flores, Luis Induni, Francisco Porcel, Wolfgang Soldati	
1978	Las que empiezan a los quince años	Tossa de Mar	Ignasi Iquino / IFISA (Barcelona)	(Spain)	Sonia Blanca, Patricia Becker, Judith Jamber, Jennifer James, Sílvia Solar, Jordi Serrat, Paco Morán, Rebeca Romer	Production, plot and script were all by Ignasi Iquino
1978	La isla de las vírgenes ardientes	Areas of the Costa Brava	Ignasi Iquino / Círculo Films (Barcelona)	(Spain)	Sita Sadafi, Roxana Dipre, Inka Maris, Maria Turriño, Alejandro de Enciso, Luis Induni, José Riesgo	With a plot and script by Manuel Cussó
1978	Alicia en la España de las maravillas	Blanes, Sant Pol de Mar (beach of La Cabra), L'Escala, Hostalric, Ripoll and Olesa de Bonesvalls	Carles Benpar / Swan Europea (Barcelona)	(Spain)	Ariadna Gil, Juan Luis Galiardo, Gunnel Lindblom, Manuel de Blas, Carme Elias, Joan Crosas, Joseph Maria Blanco, Jordi Bosch, Jaume Mir i Ferry	
1979	Cariño mío, ¿qué me has hecho?	Boulevard of Lloret de Mar and interior of a house in Santa Cristina d'Aro	Enrique Guevara / Isidor Llorca (Lloret de Mar) and Catalònia Films (Barcelona)	(Spain)	Raquel Evans, Vicente Parra, Lynn Endersson, Emilio Álvarez, Mara Laso, Antonio Maroño, Alícia Orozco	With a plot and script by Manuel Cussó
1980	La caliente niña Julieta	Girona, Tossa de Mar and Lloret de Mar	Ignasi Iquino / IFISA (Barcelona) with Columbia Films	(Spain) (United States)	Andrea Albani, Antonio Maroño, Eva Lyberten, Jordi Miralles, Vicky Palma, Lluís Torner, Jordi Vila	An S-rated film and with a plot and script by the director
1981	Ai man niu huo bing gong fu liang (Made in China)	Castell-Platja d'Aro, Castelló d’Empúries, Empuriabrava	John Liu	(Spain) (China)	John Liu, Mirta Miller, Raquel Evans, José María Blanco, Víctor Israel, Martin Garrido, Roger Paschy	A martial-arts film from Spain and Hong Kong, with the director playing the leading role
1981	Naftalina	Olot, places of Garrotxa, Girona, Sant Pere Pescador	Pep Callís / Teide, PC (Barcelona)	(Spain)	Silvia Tortosa, Tony Agusti, Pilar Dominguez, Marta Pujolar, Lluïsa Planella	Apart from her star role, Sílvia Tortosa also played a decisive role in directing the film as assistant director
1981	Un permiso para ligar	Castle and Sa Caleta of Lloret de Mar	Enrique Guevara / Isidor Llorca (Lloret de Mar) and Egg Films (Barcelona)	(Spain)	Ricard Reguant, Carles Velat, Lynn Endersson, Rosa Romero, Juan Alejandro, Ester Ferrer, José Antonio Ceinos, Jordi Térmens	A production for “over-eighteens”, written by the director and Ricard Reguant, who also took one of the parts
1981	Victòria! La gran aventura d'un poble	Castelló d’Empúries (Empuriabrava), where they filmed a war sequence	Antoni Ribas	(Spain)	Helmut Berger, Xabier Elorriaga, Norma Duval, Craig Hill, Pau Garsaball, Carme Elias, Eva Cobo, Alfred Luchetti, Josep Maria Angelat, Teresa Gimpera, Paco Rabal, Jeannine Mestre	A three-part historical film, written in conjunction Antoni Ribas with Miquel Sanz, and featuring an extensive, star-studded cast
1983	Últimas tardes con Teresa	Beaches of Blanes and Begur	Gonzalo Herralde / Samba, PC, and Impala Films (Barcelona)	(Spain)	Maribel Martín, Ángel Alcazar, Patricia Adriani, Cristina Marsillach, Mónica Randall, Alberto Closas, Juanjo Puigcorbe, Charo López, Guillermo Montesinos, José Bódalo, José Manuel Cervino, Alfred Luchetti, Ángel Jové, Marta Molins	Based on a novel of the same title by Joan Marsé
1983	Pa d'àngel	Calella de Palafrugell	Francesc Bellmunt / Òpal Films (Barcelona)	(Spain)	Eva Cobo, Llorenç de Santamaria, Josep Maria Cañete, Patrícia Soley, Pierre Oudry, Pepe Ponce, Francesc Albiol	Based on a story written by the director and by Juanjo Puigcorbé the actor, who was not involved in it as such; Jordi Balló also contributed to the script, and Quim Monzó to the dialogues
1983	Una rosa al viento	Tossa de Mar	Miquel Iglesias Bonns / MAPSUM (Barcelona)	(Spain)	Xavier Cugat, Mònica Randall, Helga Liné, Sílvia Tortosa, Alfredo Landa, Sete Molas, Joan Borrás, Marta Balletbò-Coll	A comedy based on a story and script by Manuel Cussó
1984	Waka-waka	Portbou, Colera, Castelló d’Empúries, Empuriabrava, Sant Pere Pescador: school skiing, Roses and Girona: Devesa gardens and environments of the Cathedral	Joaquim Densalat	(Spain)	Josep Barceló, Alba Ceballos, José Coronado, Nathalia Doblas, José M. Ezquerro, Eduardo Fosalba, Antonio Gimeno, Jordi Ginebra, Maureen Herrero, Sandra Leenaars, Pere Llauger, Fabia Matas	Cinéma d'auteur in every respect: adventures, action and comedy. The director of photography, Paco Riba, and the stunt-man Joan Feliu, who was from Anglès, were both killed in an accident during the shooting
1985	El lío de papá	Carnaval of Platja d'Aro	Miquel Iglesias / MAC Fusion (Barcelona)	(Spain)	Eva Cobo, María Silva, Xevi Sala, Gil Vidal, Raquel Evans, Joan Borràs, Marta Flores, Josep Peñalver, Sergio Tula	A comedy written by Enric Josa and Miquel Cussó
1986	Una nit a Casa Blanca	Portbou, Girona, Palamós, Castell-Platja d'Aro	Antoni Martí i Gich / Serveis Vídeo Empordà (La Bisbal d'Empordà)	(Spain)	Emma Vilarasau, Carles Pongiluppi, Emilio Gutiérrez Caba, Rosa Novell, Miquel Cors, Víctor Israel, Ferran Rañé, Alfred Lucchetti, Nadala Batista, Jordi Soler	The voyage of initiation of a young couple, starting in Portbou, going by way of Girona, Palamós, Castell-Platja d'Aro, etc., and taking them to Casa Blanca in the Ebro Delta area
1987	El Teatre-Museu Dalí tanca a les set	Castell de Peralada, El Port de la Selva, Sant Pere de Rodes, Roses, Castelló d’Empúries, Empuriabrava, Teatre-Museu Dalí de Figueres	Josep Montalat / Giró Films (Figueres)	(Spain)	Emilio Gutiérrez Caba, Empar Moreno, Josefina Güell, Mercedes Molina, Montserrat Domingo, Toni Montal, Jordi Serrat	A comedy, giving this director his first chance to direct a feature film
1987	Mi general	Girona	Jaime de Armiñán	(Spain)	Fernando Rey, Fernando Fernán-Gómez, Héctor Alterio, Mónica Randall, Rafael Alonso, José Luis López Vázquez, Joaquín Kremel, Álvaro de Luna, Alfred Lucchetti, Joan Borrás, Juanjo Puigcorbé, Manuel Torremocha, Amparo Baró	A group of elderly military generals, are required to attend a course in update technology, but secretly in a hidden place
1987	Daniya, el jardí de l'harem	Girona, Arab Baths of Girona, Besalú, Santa Pau, Palamós, beach of Castell	Carles Mira / IMATCO (Barcelona)	(Spain)	Ramon Madaula, Laura del Sol, Paco Guijar, Marie-Christine Barrault, Paco Casares, Fermí Reixach, Joan Monleon, Carles Sabater, Carles Fontserè, Montserrat Salvador	A historical film written by its director
1987	El gran Serafín	Castell-Platja d'Aro	José María Díaz Ulloque / Mare Nostrum Films (Platja d’Aro)	(Spain)	Ana García Obregón, Fernando Fernán Gómez, Laura del Sol, Fernando Guillén, María del Puy, Ramon Madaula, Xevi Sala, Noel J. Samson	A co-production between Barcelona and various investors from Platja d'Aro, directed by an Argentinian and based on a novel of the same title by Adolfo Bioy Casares
1990	An Angel at My Table	El Port de la Selva, La Selva de Mar	Jane Campion	(New Zealand) (United Kingdom)	Kerry Fox, Karen Fergusson, Alexia Keogh, Kevin J. Wilson, Iris Churn, Melina Bernecker, Andrew Binns	A production of New Zealand, written by the producer, and portraying the life of the writer Janet Frame
1990	Lo más natural	Sant Feliu de Guíxols	Josefina Molina / Sabre TV (Madrid)	(Spain)	Miguel Bosé, Charo López, Aitana Sánchez-Gijón, Patrick Bauchau, Viviane Vives, Sonsoles Benedicto, Rosa Novell, Fernando Valverde, José Luis Alexandre, Virginie Ledoyen	Written by Joaquim Oristrell
1991	Chatarra	Castell-Platja d'Aro	Félix Rotaeta / Avanti Films (Barcelona) and Sabre TV (Madrid)	(Spain)	Carmen Maura, Rosario Flores, Mario Gas, Àlex Casanovas, Walter Vidarte, Pere Ponce, Maria Reniu, Marieta Orozco, Santi Ricart	Based on a novel of the same title by Michel Gaztambide
1991	Shooting Elizabeth	Girona-Costa Brava Airport, Sant Feliu de Guíxols: beach of Sa Conca, Hotel Eden Rock and Pedralta	Baz Taylor	(Spain) (United States)	Mimi Rogers, Jeff Goldblum, Juan Echanove, Simó Andreu, Fernando Guillén Cuervo, Ernesto Alterio, Ricard Borràs, Santiago Álvarez	A Spanish and American production
1992	1492: Conquest of Paradise	Blanes	Ridley Scott	(Spain) (France) (United Kingdom)	Gérard Depardieu, Sigourney Weaver, Armand Assante, Fernando Rey, Ángela Molina, Arnold Vosloo, Tcheky Karyo, Frank Langella, Michael Wincott, Loren Dean, Mark Margolis, Kevin Dunn, Fernando Guillén Cuervo	A super co-production featuring the participation of the Cyrk company run by Pere Ignasi Fages (Barcelona). It was written by Roselyne Bosch and music of Vangelis
1992	Le Journal de Lady M	Cadaqués: Cap de Creus and Portlligat, El Port de la Selva, Sant Pere de Rodes, Banyoles, bay of Sant Feliu de Guíxols	Alain Tanner	(Spain) (United States)	Myriam Mézières, Juanjo Puigcorbé, Félicité Wouassi, Antoine Basler, Carlota Soldevilla, Marie Peyrucq-Yamou, Gladys Gambie, Olivier Ceyssens, Francesc Peña, Antonio Chavarrías	Written by the leading actress, Myriam Mézières
1993	Terra de canons	Cadaqués, Cap de Creus	Antoni Ribas / Montornès Films and Ken Films (Barcelona)	(Spain)	Lorenzo Quinn, Cristina Pineda, Mario Guariso, Sydne Rome, Antoni Guinart, Amparo Muñoz, Anthony Quinn, Marina Rosell, Ferran Sesé, Carme Capdet	Completing the author's trilogy that had begun with La ciutat cremada and continued with “Victòria!”
1993	Bufons i reis	Sant Feliu de Guíxols: Boadella Creek and Santa Clotilde Gardens	Lluís Zayas / Roxy Films, Zoom TV and Visual Films (Barcelona)	(Spain)	Antonio Valero, Vicky Peña, Jordi Dauder, Mercè Pons, Pepa López, Pep Cruz, Miguel Insua, Pep Martínez, Marian Varela	Written by the director himself
1995	Costa Brava (Àlbum de família)	The Jewish Quarter of Girona, Palamós and Lake of Banyoles	Marta Balletbò i Coll	(Spain)	Desi del Valle, Marta Balletbò i Coll, Montserrat Gausachs, Sergi Schaaff	A thoroughly personal production in every respect, though written in conjunction with Ana Simón Cerezo
1995	Stirb für mich/Tod in Spanien	Blanes	Michael Gutmann	(Germany)	Kai Wiesinger, Ana Álvarez, Felix Eitner, Antonio Valero, August Schmölzer, Christine Velan, Michael Mendl, Nadia de Gallardo, Montserrat Alcoverro, Vincent Flood	A German television production, in the crime genre
1996	En brazos de la mujer madura	Girona, Calella de Palafrugell, Torroella de Montgrí, Fontanilles	Manuel Lombardero / Sogetel and Lolafilms (Barcelona)	(Spain)	Juan Diego Botto, Faye Dunaway, Joanna Pacula, Carmen Elías, Rosana Pastor, Florence Pernel, Imanol Arias, Miguel Ángel García, Ingrid Rubio, Lorena García, Nacho Novo	Based on a novel by Stephen Vizinczey (In Praise of Older Women), adapted by Rafael Azcona and the director himself
1997	Carreteras secundarias	El Port de la Selva, Begur, Sa Tuna, Cap de Creus, Figueres	Emilio Martínez-Lázaro / Sogetel, Fernando Trueba, Kaplan and Olmo Films (Madrid)	(Spain)	Antonio Resines, Fernando Ramallo, Maribel Verdú, Miriam Díaz Aroca, Jesús Bonilla, Montserrat Carulla, Mayte Blasco	Script by Ignacio Martínez de Pisón is set in the Costa Brava
1998	La ciutat dels prodigis	L'Estartit	Mario Camus / Institut del Cinema Català and Sogedasa (Madrid)	(Spain) (France) (Portugal)	Olivier Martínez, Emma Suárez, François Marthouret, Joaquín Díaz, José María Sanz Beltrán, Tony Isbert, Empar Moreno, Lluís Homar, Ramón Langa, Montserrat Carulla, Marián Aguilera, Boris Ruiz	Based on a novel of the same title by Eduardo Mendoza, adapted by the director, Olivier Rolin, Gustau Hernández and Carme Cases
1998	Manolito Gafotas	Tamariu	Miguel Albaladejo / Sogedasa (L'Hospitalet de Llobregat)	(Spain)	David Sánchez del Rey, Adriana Ozores, Roberto Álvarez, Antonio Gamero, Fedra Lorente, Marta Fernández-Muro, Gloria Muñoz, Alejandro Martínez, David Martínez, Laura Calabuig, Sergio del Pino, Álvaro Miranda, Belinda Washington	Based on a film plot by Elvira Lindo and books of the same title on the character involved
2001	Núvols d'estiu	Calella de Palafrugell, Llafranc, Tamariu, L'Estartit, Empúries	Felipe Vega / Tornasol Films (Madrid) and Messidor Films (Barcelona)	(Spain)	Roberto Enríquez, Natalia Millán, David Selvas, Irene Montalà, Roger Casamajor	A romantic comedy of suspense, written by its director with Manuel Hidalgo
2001	Les Mains vides	Portbou, Port-Vendres, l'Albera	Marc Recha / Eddie Saeta (Barcelona) and JBA Production (França)	(Spain) (France)	Eduardo Noriega, Dominique Marcas, Jéremie Lippmann, El Verd, Olivier Gourmet, Jeanne Favre, Sébastien Viala, Eulalia Ramón, Mireille Perrier, Mireia Ros, Luis Hostalot, David Recha	Written by the author, Mireia Vidal and Nadine Lamari
2001	Mi casa es tu casa	Begur	Miguel Álvarez / Tesela and Sogecine (Madrid)	(Spain)	Jorge Bosch, Fanny Gautier, Chete Lera, Rosana Pastor, Luis Marco, Iván Massagué, Ramón Langa, Mar Regueras, Juan José Ballesta	This romantic comedy was the feature-film debut of this film-maker who was born in Zurich in 1970, the son of Spanish immigrants, and who used to spend his summers in Begur, where he filmed it over the summer
2003	Soldados de Salamina	Girona	David Trueba / Lolafilms S.A. and Fernando Trueba P.C., S.A.	(Spain)	Ariadna Gil, Ramón Fontserè, Joan Dalmau, María Botto, Diego Luna, Alberto Ferreiro, Luis Cuenca, Lluis Villanueva, Ana Labordeta, Julio Manrique, Eric Caravaca	Based on a novel of Javier Cercas
2003	Las voces de la noche	Girona	Salvador García Ruíz	(Spain)	Laia Marull, Tristan Ulloa, Vicky Peña, Guillermo Toledo, Álvaro de Luna, Paloma Paso Jardiel, Juli Mira, Ana Wagener, Ramon Madaula, Malena Alterio	Based on a novel "Las palabras de la noche" of Natàlia Ginzburg
2006	Perfume: The Story of a Murderer	Girona	Tom Tykwer / Andrew Birkin Bernd Eichinger Martin Moszkowicz	(Spain) (Germany) (France)	Ben Whishaw, Dustin Hoffman, Alan Rickman, Rachel Hurd-Wood, Corinna Harfouch, Carlos Gramaje, Birgit Minichmayr, Karoline Herfurth, Jessica Schwarz, Joanna Griffiths, Otto Sander	Based on a novel of Patrick Süskind
2007	Savage Grace	Girona	Tom Kalin / A Contraluz Films, ATO Pictures, Killer Films, Montfort Producciones	(Spain) (United States) (France)	Julianne Moore, Stephen Dillane, Eddie Redmayne, Elena Anaya, Hugh Dancy, Unax Ugalde, Belén Rueda	Based on true events. It tells the story of Barbara Daly (Julianne Moore), a woman who becomes part of American high society after marrying Brooks Baekeland (Stephen Dillane), heir to the Bakelite fortune
2008	El juego del ahorcado	Girona	Manuel Gómez Pereira	(Spain)	Clara Lago, Álvaro Cervantes, Adriana Ugarte, Abel Folk, Victòria Pagès, Victor Valdivia, Boris Ruiz	
2009	Tres dies amb la família	Girona: Church of Sant Feliu, funeral home and cemetery	Mar Coll	(Spain)	Nausica Bonnín, Eduard Fernández, Francesc Orella, Ramon Fontserè, Philippine Leroy-Beaulieu	Léa suddenly have to travel to Girona where his grandfather has died. Waiting for his family, which he has barely seen since agents can he go abroad. The death of the patriarch of Vich i Carbó is the perfect excuse to force their descendants living
2010	Agnosía	Stairs of Girona Cathedral, and Celrà	Eugeni Mira	(Spain)	Eduardo Noriega, Martina Gedeck, Sergi Mateu, Bàrbara Goenaga, Jack Taylor, Fèlix Gómez, Miranda Makaroff	Romantic thriller set in Barcelona in the late nineteenth century, which is preparing a conspiracy surrounding the mysterious illness of a young heiress
2010	Ermessenda	Girona: Stairs of Sant Martí, Sant Daniel	Lluís Maria Güell	(Spain)	Laia Marull, Lluís Homar, Rosa Renom, Julio Manrique, Pau Durà, Dafnis Balduz, Álvaro Cervantes, Roger Coma, Francesc Garrido, Alba Sanmartí, Ricard Sales, Francesc Orella, Bea Segura, Marina Gatell, Joan Massotkleiner, Oriol Vila	Series TV3 (Catalonia Television). Novelized biography of the last years of the life of the Countess Ermessenda
2011	The Monk	Square and stairs of Girona Cathedral, and several streets of the Old Town of Girona	Dominik Moll	(Spain) (France)	Vincent Cassel, Déborah François, Joséphine Japy, Sergi López, Catherine Mouchet, Jordi Dauder, Geraldine Chaplin, Roxane Duran, Frédéric Noaille, Javivi, Martine Vandeville, Pierre-Félix Gravière, Serge Feuillard, Ernst Umhauer, Jean-Francois Vendroux	The devil try to corrupt a young novice, Brother Ambrose, who, after being abandoned on the doorstep of a Cistercian monastery, is welcomed and educated by the monks
2011	Passi el que passi	Aiguaviva, Estanyol, Bescanó	Robert Bellsolà / Aiguaviva Films (Aiguaviva)	(Spain)	Carlotta Bosch, Antonio De Matteo, Mireia Vallès, David Romero, Marcel Tomàs, Mavel de la Rosa, Katerina Kostalova	Alex is a writer who is writing a very personal film: the story of a weekend in which he proposed to make love four times with his wife
2012	Tengo ganas de ti	Bridge Gomez (Pont d'en Gómez) and elsewhere in the old quarter of Girona	Fernando González Molina	(Spain)	Mario Casas, María Valverde, Clara Lago, Nerea Camacho, Diego Martín, Marina Salas, Andrea Duro, Luis Fernández, Antonio Velázquez, Ferrán Vilajosana, Álvaro Cervantes, Nerea Camacho, Carme Elías	
2013	Menú Degustació	Hostal Empúries in L'Escala	Roger Gual	(Spain)	Jan Cornet, Claudia Bassols, Vicenta N'Dongo, Stephen Rea, Marta Torne, Fionnula Flanagan, Andrea Ros, Andrew Tarbet, Santi Millán	With a year in advance, Marc and Rachel decide to dine at the best restaurant in the world, situated in an idyllic cove along the Costa Brava. The book is even more important when it announced that its table is for the night when the restaurant will close its doors forever. But Marc and Rachel are no longer together, take nearly a year apart. Nothing in the world will give up this last appointment, their reunion on a unique culinary event on a night when nothing will go as expected.
