= S'Agaró =

- Neighbourhood
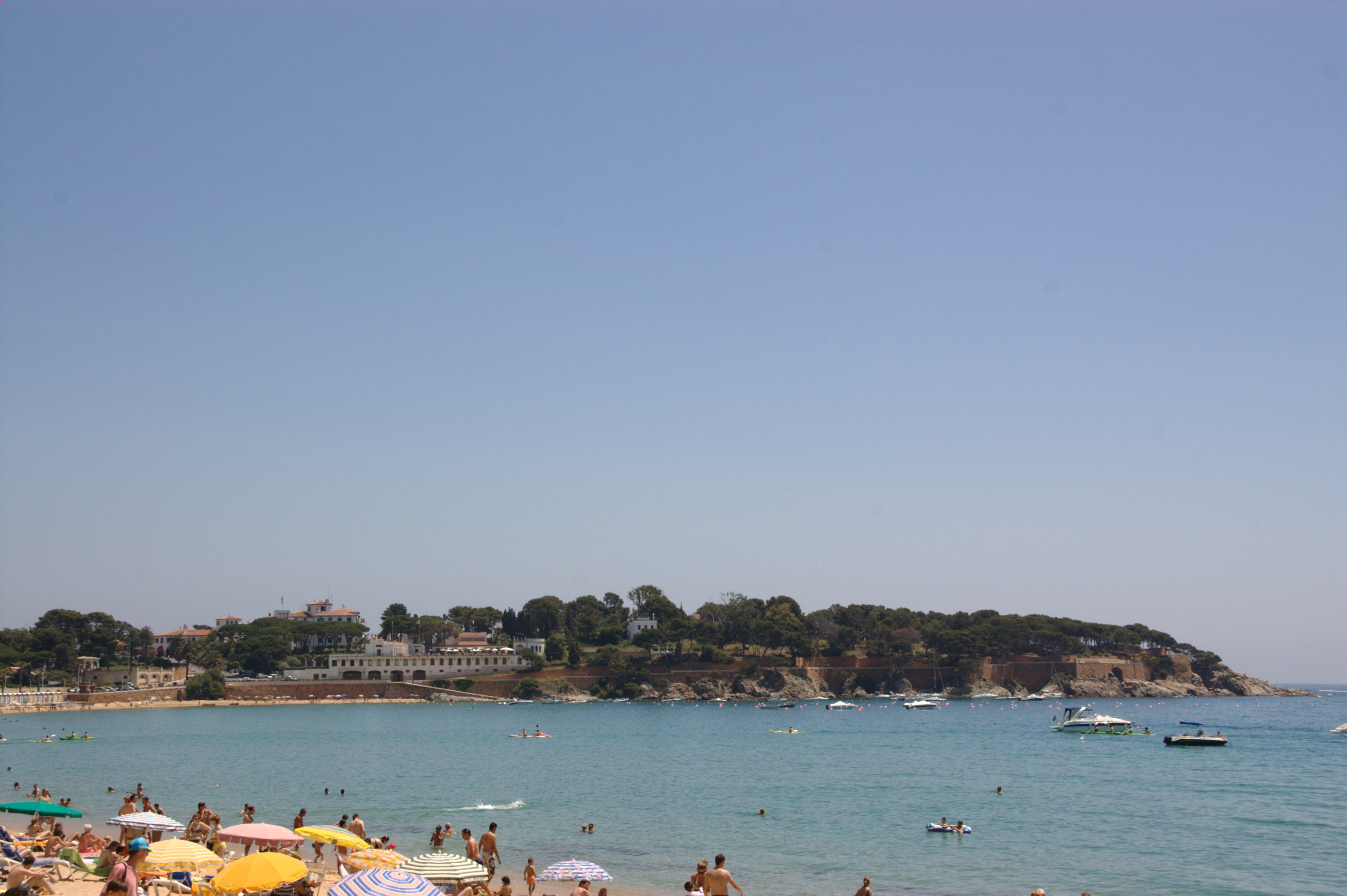
- S'Agaró seen from Sant Pol beach

- Location within Province of Girona Location within Catalonia Location within Spain
- Coordinates: 41.7915°N 3.05678°E
- Country: Spain
- Community: Catalonia
- Province: Girona
- Comarca: Baix Empordà
- Municipality: Castell-Platja d'Aro

S'Agaró (Catalan pronunciation: [səɣəˈɾo]) is an upmarket resort on the Costa Brava between Sant Feliu de Guíxols and Platja d'Aro. It is part of the municipality of Castell-Platja d'Aro, itself in the comarca of Baix Empordà and province of Girona in Catalonia, Spain. The resort was developed from the early 1920s on the peninsular between the beaches of Platja de Sant Pol and Platja de Sa Conca.

To date, the promontory contains about 60 exclusive houses and hotels. The world famous five-star Hostal de la Gavina dominates the view from Sant Pol beach. The original development has been declared as a historical complex and protected as a cultural asset of national interest since 1995.

The GR 92 long-distance footpath, which runs the length of the Mediterranean coast of Spain, uses the historic camí de ronda that follows s'Agaró's coastline. The cami de ronda was rebuilt as part of the development, creating a walk in a semi-artificial landscape between sea, rocks and pines that integrates the urbanization with nature. To the north, the GR 92 crosses the beach of Sa Conca and diverts around the extensive Marina de Port d'Oro to reach Platja d'Aro. To the south it passes along the beach of Sant Pol to reach Sant Feliu de Guíxols.

== History ==
In 1916, the Girona industrialist Josep Ensesa i Pujades purchased a plot of land in between the beaches of Sant Pol and Sa Conca, near the mouth of a stream called Es Garó. His initial plan was to build a summer house, but he bought more land around it to make more plots, and thus the project to develop the area was born. The new area didn't have a name, so the family chose to call it after the stream that ran through it.

However, at least in part due to the disruption caused by the First World War, the plan did not initially prosper. After the war, Josep Ensesa i Gubert, the son of Josep Ensesa i Pujades, built the first house on the plot, called Senya Blanca and completed in 1924, entrusting the design to the architect Rafael Masó i Valentí. The house had neither electricity nor running water. More land was then bought, and the whole development entrusted to Masó, who was inspired by the ideas of the garden city movement of the time. Specifically, it is known the Masó had visited the garden city of Hellerau, near Dresden, in 1912.

It was Masó's role to assure that the development, which was planned as a community of seaside villas and a small inn, would be in sympathy with the landscape. Masó was a campaigner for traditional Catalan design, and he drew on the local architectural vocabulary of porticos, towers, terraces and low rooflines to conjure a colony aimed at those with artistic tastes. Purchasers of land bound themselves to carefully drawn contracts that guaranteed buildings of visual unity. After Masó's death, in 1935, Francesc Folguera took over the project, going on to build the church situated on the highest point of the resort.

Although originally built by Masó as a dwelling and soon after converted to a hotel, the current Hostal de la Gavina is largely the work of Folguera. Since the early 1950s famous Hollywood movies like Pandora and the Flying Dutchman with Ava Gardner, Suddenly Last Summer with Elizabeth Taylor and Mr. Arkadin by Orson Welles were shot in s'Agaró. This made the Hostal de La Gavina a meeting place of many famous film stars, musicians, political figures and Nobel Prize winners. The beach scenes in the movie Mysterious Island (1961 film) were filmed at S'Agaró.

Michael Frayn, the English comic writer, devoted a number of pieces about the developers of s'Agaro and their vision in The Guardian between 1960 and 1962, collected in The Original Michael Frayn.

A huge construction boom took place inland from the original resort, which does not form part of the 'gated community'. In 2005, it had a population of 1,237 inhabitants.

== Bibliography ==
- Luis Batlle y Prats. "s'Agaró." Researching Coastal and Resort Destination Management: Cultures and Histories of Tourism Palibrio, Jul 1, 2012. pg. 28-31
