= Castell d'Aro, Platja d'Aro i S'Agaró =

Castell-Platja d'Aro
- Municipality
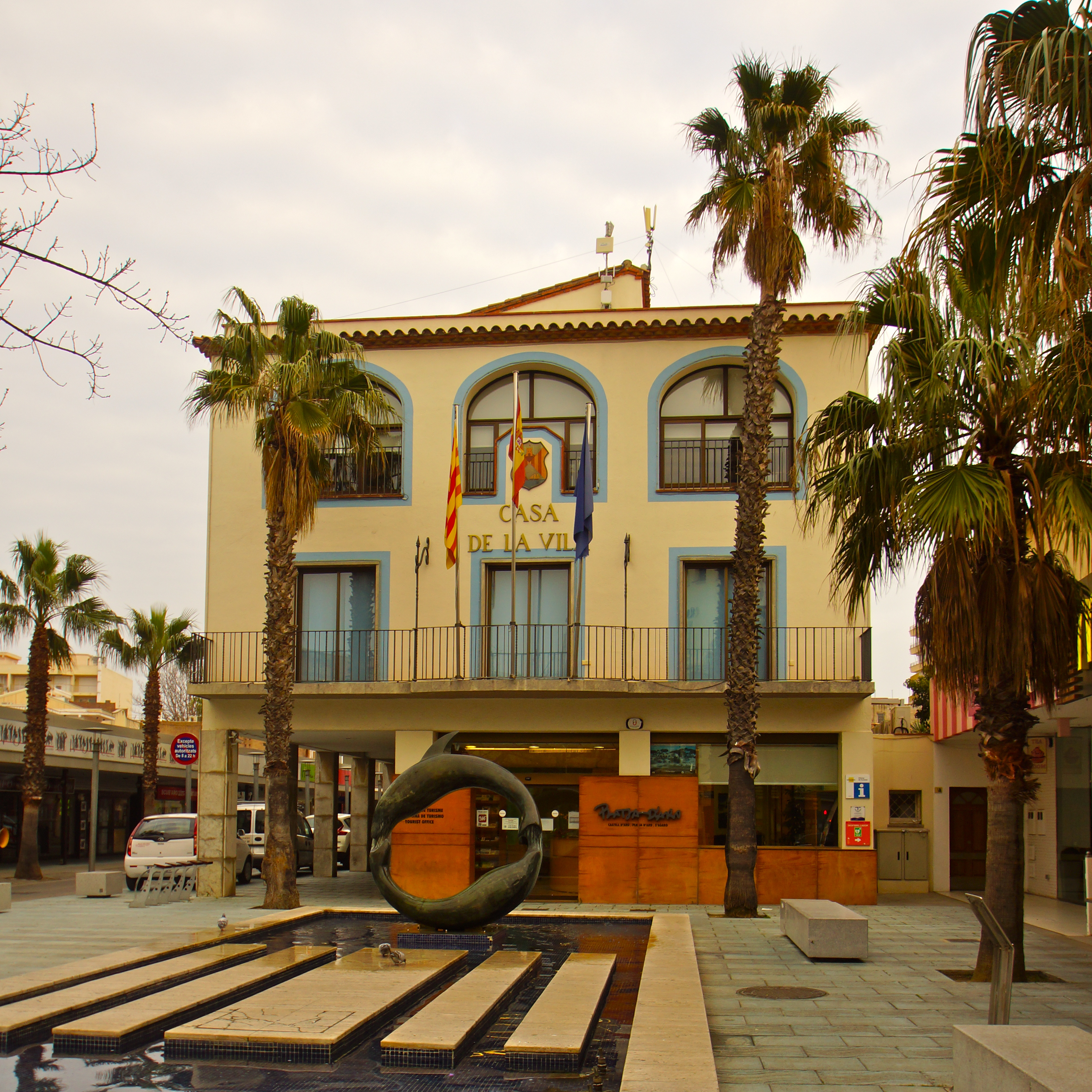
- Town hall

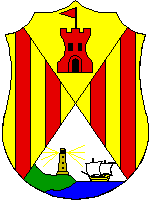
- Coat of arms

- Location within Province of Girona Location within Catalonia Location within Spain
- Coordinates: 41°49′09″N 3°04′06″E
- Country: Spain
- Community: Catalonia
- Province: Girona
- Comarca: Baix Empordà

Government
  - Mayor: Maurici Jiménez Ruiz (CiU)

Area
  - Total: 21.8 km^{2} (8.4 sq mi)
- Elevation: 5 m (16 ft)

Population (2025-01-01)
  - Total: 12,982
  - Density: 596/km^{2} (1,540/sq mi)
- Demonym(s): Castellarenc; Platjarenc
- Postal code: 17250
- Website: www.platjadaro.com

Castell d'Aro, Platja d'Aro i S'Agaró (Catalan pronunciation: [kəsˌteʎˈðaɾu ˌpladʒəˈðaɾuj səɣəˈɾo]) is a municipality in the middle of the Costa Brava in Catalonia, Spain. It is formed from two parts: Castell d'Aro (also known by the Spanish name: Castillo de Aro) is an ancient village built around a medieval castle and a fortified church, 3 km (2 miles) inland on the road from Platja d'Aro to Santa Cristina d'Aro; and Platja d'Aro (also known by the Spanish name: Playa de Aro) is a coastal town on the road from Palamós to Sant Feliu de Guíxols which stretches along a large 2 km (1 1/4 mile) beach. generally Castell-Platja d'Aro's population is about 12,000 but can exceed 100,000 in summer months.

Originally a small fishing village, Platja d'Aro is now a major coastal resort, popular predominantly with Catalans and villa-owning Northern Europeans.

Along the coast, connecting the main beach with numerous small beaches, is the Camí de Ronda. This ancient path now forms part of the GR 92 long distance footpath, which runs the length of the Mediterranean coast of Spain. It passes along the seafront promenade of Platja d'Aro. To the north the path follows the rocky coastline and crosses several beaches to reach the southern end of the beachside promenade of Sant Antoni de Calonge. To the south it diverts around the extensive Marina de Port d'Oro and crosses the Platja de Sa Conca before following the coastline around the headland of S'Agaró to the resort of the same name.

== Location ==
Castell d'Aro is located in the heart of the Costa Brava, 80 km (50 miles) north of Barcelona. It borders with Calonge to the north, Santa Cristina d'Aro to the west, Sant Feliu to the south and the Coast to the East. Castell-Platja d'Aro occupies the eastern end of the Vall d'Aro, a narrow plain drained by the river Ridaura and located between the Mountain ranges of Cadiretes and southern end of the Gavarres. Platja d'Aro was originally a small fishing village on the highway between Palamós and Sant Feliu de Guíxols with a 2 km (1 1/4 mile) long beach. It is now a major tourist resort with hotels and other commercial premises.

== History ==
=== Prehistory ===
The first evidence of human habitation are a number of tombs dating from the Neolithic era 2500 BC in the Pinell area. Around 2000 BC, towards the end of the Neolithic period, groups of humans settled in the mountains of Treumal and Vallvanera. There are a number of monuments from this period, including the menhir of Vallbanera and the dolmen Cova dels Moros ("Cove of the Moors").

=== Roman times ===
Roman ruins were discovered at the Vila de Pla de Palol dating from the 1st-4th Centuries AD. These occupy an area of 10,000 m^{2} (2 1/2 acres), and retain the majority of the patios and open spaces. The villa was part of a large agricultural estate including vineyards. It also exported clay for the manufacture of ceramics that were later exported by sea from the natural harbor of Cove Rovira.

=== Middle Ages ===
From the 9th century the countryside started to recover from Sarracen raids and the repopulation of the Vall d'Aro began. The first arrivals were farmers. In 781 Charlemagne offered the Bishop of Girona the territory of the Vall d'Aro. The first documented reference of Platja d'Aro, in its original name of Fanals d'Amunt, appears in 968.

King Lothair I confirmed his possessions to Sunyer, the Abbot of the monastery of Sant Feliu de Guíxols, including Fanals d'Amunt and its church. The origin of Castell d'Aro is the Castle of Benedormiens. The Castle was first documented in 1041, when the religious authorities, the local Knights and Nobles granted the monastery of Sant Feliu de Guíxols the safekeeping of the castle with the obligation to protect all the Vall d'Aro, of which Fanals was an important part. In 1585 a new church was built in Fanals de Baix, the present Fanals d'Aro. A new settlement grew around this building deserting the older Fanals d'Amunt. In 1774 an extension was completed to the Church of Fanals d'Aro.

=== Modern ===
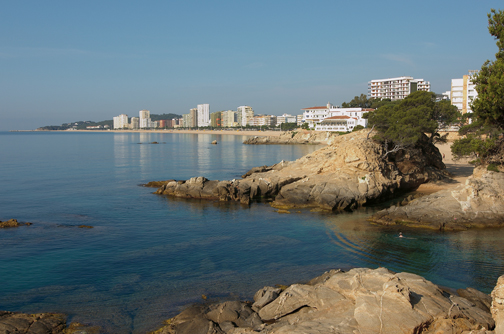
Platja D'Aro Beach

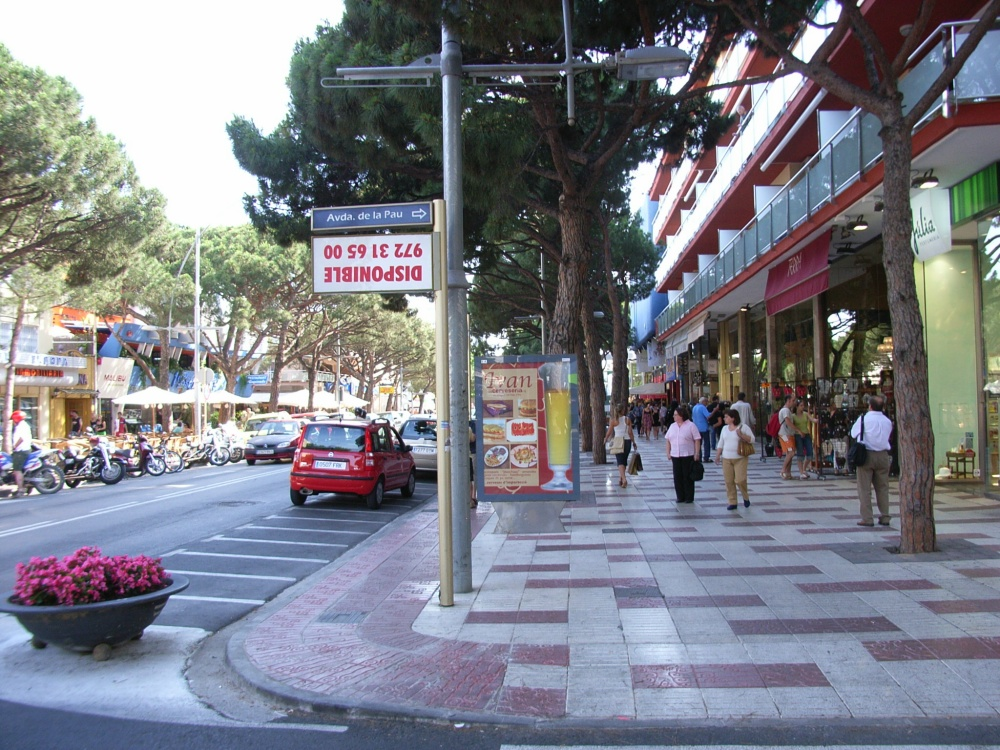
Shopping Main street

During the following centuries only one municipality existed, in 1858 the area was divided with Romanyà, Bell-lloc, Santa Cristina d'Aro and Solius becoming separate from Castell d'Aro and Fanals d'Aro. This is regarded as the official creation of the two cities, Santa Cristina de Aro and Castell d'Aro. In 1843 the district was characterized by high rents, a centralized municipal model with limited suffrage. The elections of 1869 reflected the federal and republican character of Empordà and Fanals. As a result, constitutional guarantees were suspended and disarmament of the popular military service ordered by Central Government. The federalists took up arms supported by the inhabitants of Fanals, they participated in the Foc de Bisbal, where they faced a number of government forces.

Between 1892 and 1969, Castell d'Aro was connected to the city of Girona and the port of Sant Feliu de Guíxols by the narrow gauge Sant Feliu de Guíxols–Girona railway. The line has since been converted into a greenway.

The architect Rafael Masó Valentí was instructed by the Ensesa family to design a new residential estate at S'Agaró. It was designed as a self-contained garden city. At the same time swimming pools at Sant Pol were built as well as the luxurious Monumental Hotel and the Hotel Gavina. In 1962 as part of new tourist development the municipality changed its name from Fanals d'Aro to Platja d'Aro. The council moved their offices at the same time from Castell d'Aro to Platja d'Aro. The town sought to promote itself internationally; in 1964 an offer was made for a week holiday to 50 couples celebrating their silver wedding anniversary. Another campaign focused on honeymooners with the slogan "love is found in Platja d'Aro".

In 1970 the City Council, owner of the Castle of Benedormiens de Castell d'Aro, ordered its first restoration. The oldest part was conserved dating from the 12th century. In 1978 a Carnival Fiesta and in 1979 the first democratic Council was elected. In 1983 the rooms of the Castle of Benedormiens were altered for exhibition space. In 1995 the old nucleus of Castell was declared as an official area of interest and conservation area by the Generalitat de Catalunya, together with S'Agaró.

== Climate ==
According to the Köppen Climate Classification, Castell-Platja d'Aro has a hot-summer mediterranean climate (Csa).

== Seismic activity ==
Castell-Platja d'Aro is located in a seismic zone, which means that occasionally quakes are felt but, most of them are just small vibrations or light shaking.
