= Pandora and the Flying Dutchman =

1951 film by Albert Lewin

- Theatrical release poster
- Directed by: Albert Lewin
- Written by: Albert Lewin
- Produced by: Albert Lewin; Joseph Kaufman
- Starring: James Mason; Ava Gardner; Nigel Patrick; Sheila Sim; Harold Warrender; Mario Cabré
- Cinematography: Jack Cardiff
- Edited by: Ralph Kemplen
- Music by: Alan Rawsthorne
- Production company: Romulus Films
- Distributed by: International Film Distributors
- Release date: February 1951
- Running time: 122 minutes
- Country: United Kingdom
- Languages: English; Catalan; Spanish
- Budget: $1.2 million
- Box office: $1.6 million

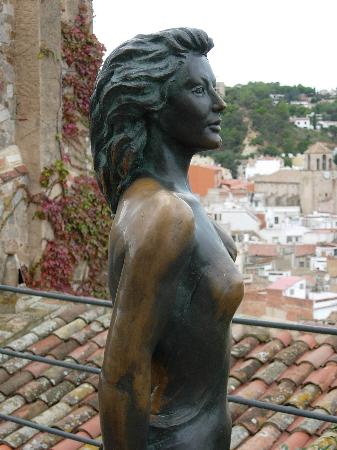
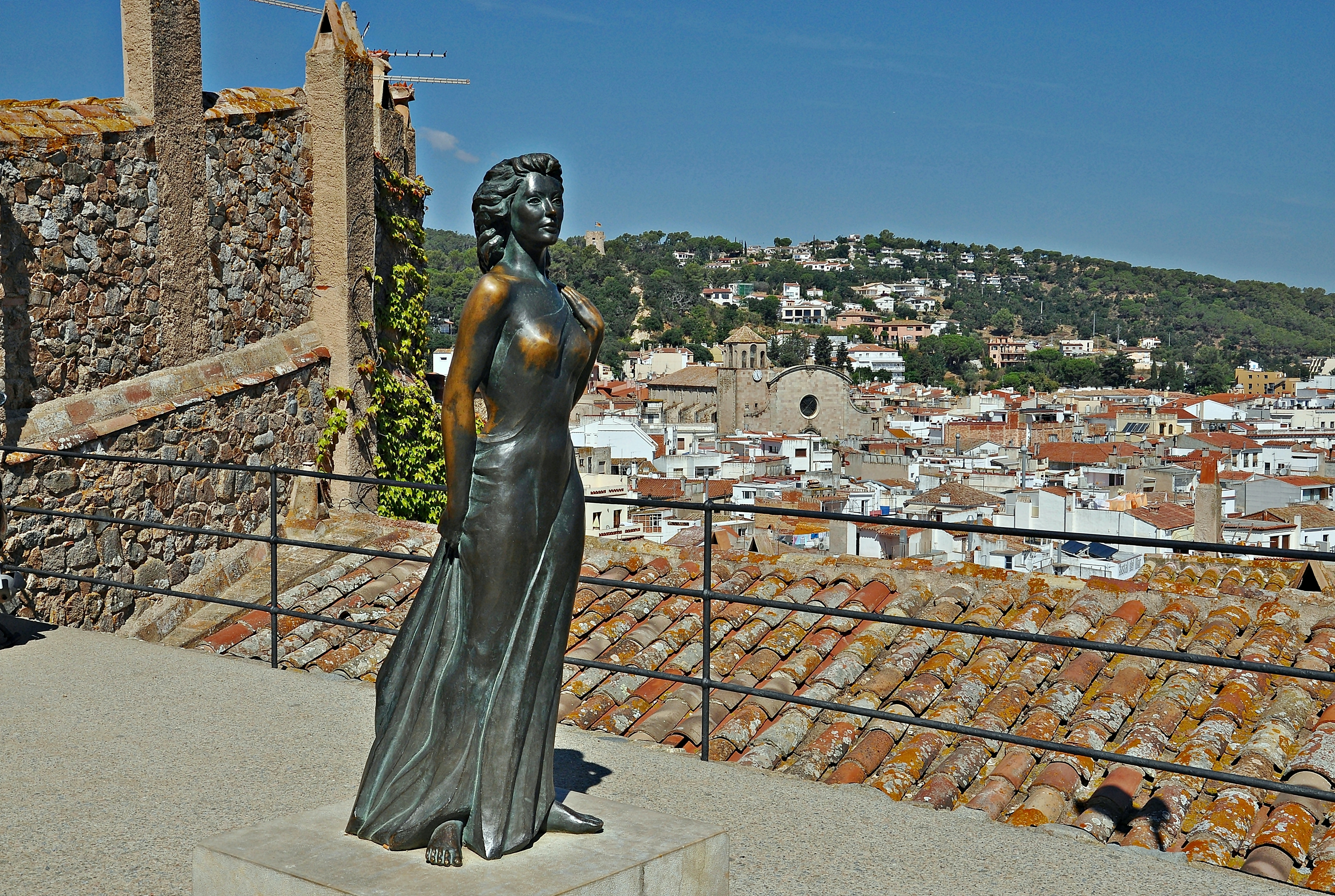
A statue of Ava Gardner as Pandora in Tossa de Mar, Spain, where filming took place

Pandora and the Flying Dutchman is a 1951 British romantic fantasy drama film written and directed by Albert Lewin. The screenplay is based on the legend of the Flying Dutchman.

The film stars Ava Gardner and James Mason in the title roles, with Nigel Patrick, Sheila Sim, Harold Warrender, Mario Cabré, and Marius Goring in supporting parts.

== Plot ==
In September 1930, fishermen in the fictional small Spanish port of Esperanza make a grim discovery in their nets: the bodies of a man and a woman. The resultant ringing of church bells in the village brings the local police and the resident archaeologist, Geoffrey Fielding, to the beach. Geoffrey returns to his villa and, breaking the "fourth wall", retells the story of these two people, beginning the previous March.

Esperanza's small group of English expatriates revolves around Pandora Reynolds, an alluring American nightclub singer and femme fatale. All the men love her (or believe that they do), but Pandora is unable to love anyone. When Reggie Demarest, one of her admirers, commits suicide in front of Pandora and her friends by drinking wine that he has laced with poison, Pandora shows indifference, and later comments that she is relieved by his death because she was bored by his persistent depression.

Pandora tests her admirers by demanding they give up something they value. She agrees to marry a land-speed record holder, Stephen Cameron, after he sends his racing car tumbling into the sea at her request. That night, Dutch captain Hendrik van der Zee arrives in Esperanza. Impulsively swimming out to his yacht, Pandora finds him painting a picture of her posed as her namesake, Pandora, whose actions brought an end to the earthly paradise in Greek mythology. Hendrik appears to fall in love with Pandora, and he moves into the same hotel complex as the other expatriates.

Geoffrey and Hendrik become friends, collaborating to seek background information on Geoffrey's local finds. One of these relics is a notebook written in Old Dutch, which confirms Geoffrey's suspicion that Hendrik van der Zee is the Flying Dutchman, a 17th-century ship captain who murdered his wife, believing her to be unfaithful. He blasphemed against God at his murder trial, where he was sentenced to death.

The evening before his execution, a mysterious force opened the Dutchman's prison doors and allowed him to escape to his waiting ship, where in a dream it was revealed to him that his wife was innocent and he was doomed to sail the seas for eternity, unless he could find a woman who loved him enough to die for him. Every seven years, the Dutchman can go ashore for six months to search for that woman.

Despite her impending wedding to Stephen, Pandora declares her love for Hendrik, but he is unwilling to have her die for his sake, and tries to provoke her into hating him. Juan Montalvo, an arrogant, famous bullfighter, comes to Esperanza. In love with Pandora, he murders Hendrik out of jealousy, but as soon as he leaves, Hendrik comes back to life. When Montalvo sees Hendrik in the audience at the bullfight the next day, he becomes petrified with fear and is fatally gored by the bull. Before dying, Montalvo tells Pandora about his murder of his romantic rival, leaving her confused.

On the eve of her wedding, Pandora asks Geoffrey if he knows anything about Hendrik that will clear up her confusion. Once he sees the Flying Dutchman preparing to sail away, he hands her his translation of the notebook. However, the Dutchman's yacht is becalmed, and, on learning the truth, Pandora swims out to Hendrik again. He shows her a small portrait of his murdered wife, who looked exactly like Pandora. Hendrik explains that he saw her as his chance to finally escape his doom, but tried to push her away to save her, and she says she is willing to die for him. When Pandora asks how long they have left together, Hendrik replies that it does not matter, as the perfectness of their love places them outside of time. They kiss, and suddenly, a fierce storm erupts. Geoffrey watches as the vessel is overwhelmed and sinks.

The only survivor who knows the truth, Geoffrey toasts the Dutchman: "May the consummation of your love endure as long as the punishment that made you worthy of it."

== Cast ==
- James Mason as Hendrik van der Zee
- Ava Gardner as Pandora Reynolds
- Nigel Patrick as Stephen Cameron
- Sheila Sim as Janet
- Harold Warrender as Geoffrey Fielding
- Mario Cabré as Juan Montalvo
- Marius Goring as Reggie Demarest
- John Laurie as Angus
- Pamela Mason (credited as Pamela Kellino) as Jenny
- Patricia Raine as Peggy
- Marguerite d'Alvarez (credited as Margarita d'Alvarez) as Señora Montalvo
- La Pillina as Spanish dancer
- Abraham Sofaer as judge
- Francisco Igual as Vicente
- Guillermo Beltrán as barman
- Lilli Molnar (credited as Lila Molnar) as Geoffrey's housekeeper

== Production ==
Albert Lewin, an MGM producer at the time, was able to produce Pandora due to the postponement of Quo Vadis in 1949. The film was co-financed by Romulus Films. There are a number of literary references in the film, including to Matthew Arnold's poem "Dover Beach", the Rubaiyat of Omar Khayyam, and Ernest Hemingway's 1926 novel The Sun Also Rises.

The film was an early picture from the Woolf brothers, James and John.

Pandora was primarily filmed in Tossa de Mar, on the Costa Brava in Catalonia, Spain, though the land record speed scenes were shot at Pendine Sands in Wales. In Tossa de Mar, a statue of Gardner was erected in 1996 on the hill overlooking the town's main beach. Most of the dialogue in the film is in English, but some characters speak Catalan (the local fishermen at the beginning of the film) and Spanish (the bullfighter's entourage).

Artist Man Ray, a friend of Lewin, produced some sets for Pandora. He created particular cubist-style chess pieces and several paintings seen in the film, notably the surrealist scene in the De Chirico fashion.

In the United States, Metro-Goldwyn-Mayer delayed the film until after the release of Gardner's star-making performance in Show Boat (1951). The tactic proved effective, as Show Boat solidified her status as a rapidly rising star.

A digitally restored version of the film was released in February 2020. The restoration process took more than a dozen years, with the Cohen Media Group ultimately funding a 4K version, which included more than 700 hours of digital restoration on 177,120 frames of the film.

== Reception ==
=== Box office ===
According to MGM records, Pandora and the Flying Dutchman earned $1,247,000 in the US and Canada, and $354,000 elsewhere. Other records say it cost £308,800, and earned producer income of £225,000. It was one of the most popular films at the British box office 1951, being judged by Kinematograph Weekly as a "notable performer" at British cinemas that year.

=== Critical response ===
Howard Thompson of The New York Times gave the film a mixed review upon its release, describing it as a "serious, complex but unexciting study of passions and sublime love". Thompson praised the "brilliance and invention" of the cinematography by Jack Cardiff, noting that the film's most rewarding moments include Cardiff "capturing the ghostly qualities of the tale and the exquisite beauties of Spanish settings and folkways."

On the review aggregator website Rotten Tomatoes, 68% of 34 critics' reviews of the film are positive.

== Comic book adaptation ==
- Eastern Color Movie Love #11 (October 1951)
