= Cap de Creus =

Peninsula and headland in Catalonia, Spain

Coordinates: 42°19′09″N 3°19′19″E

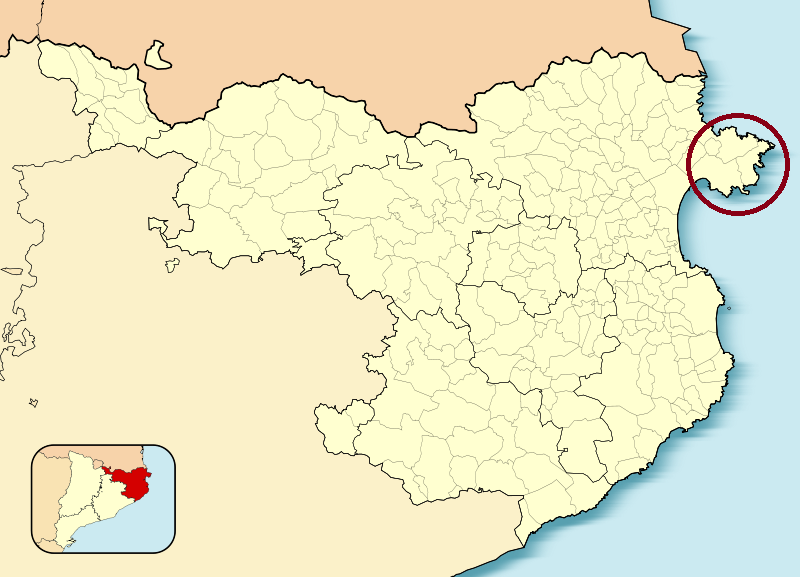
Map

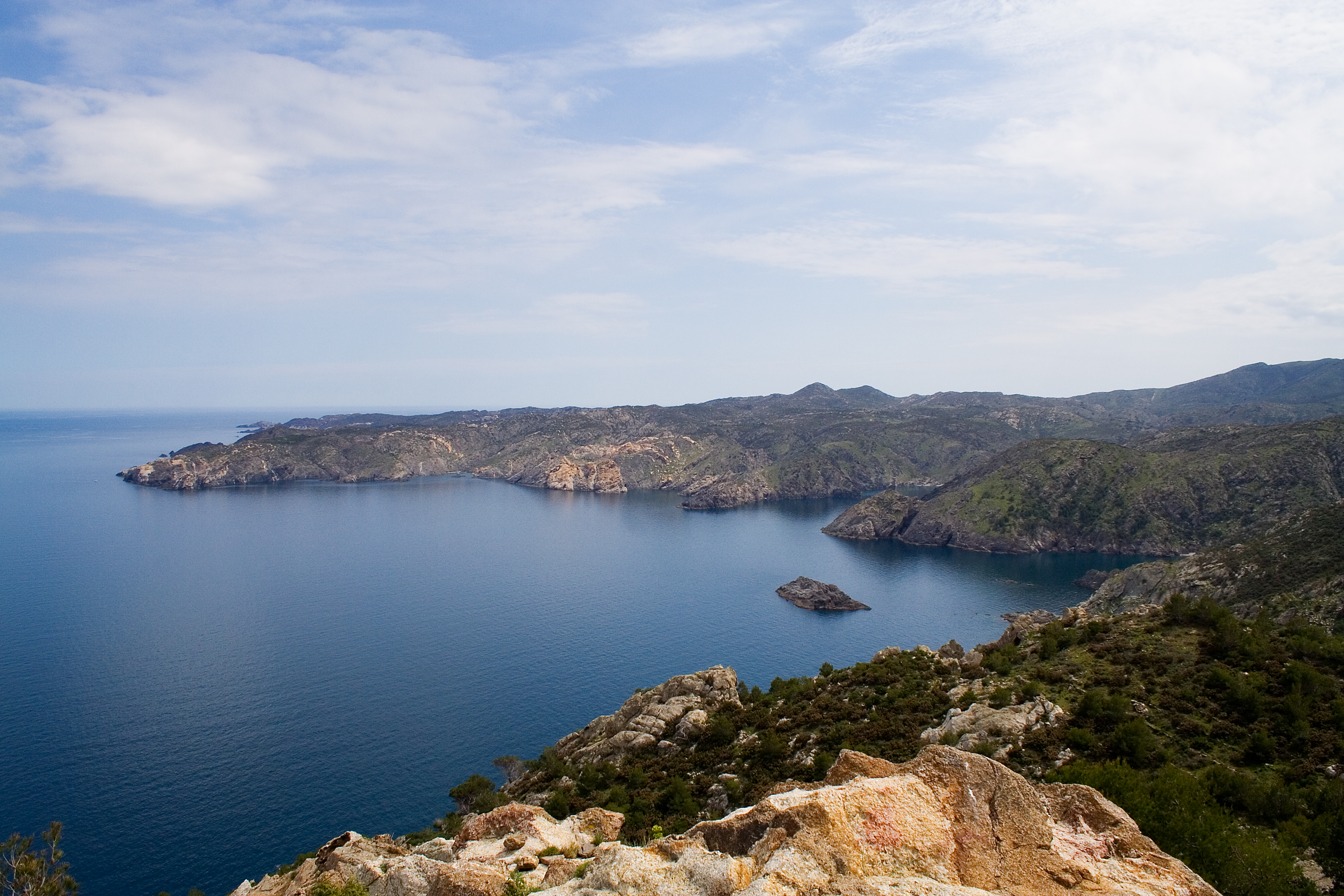
El Golfet viewed from Cap Gros, Cap de Creus

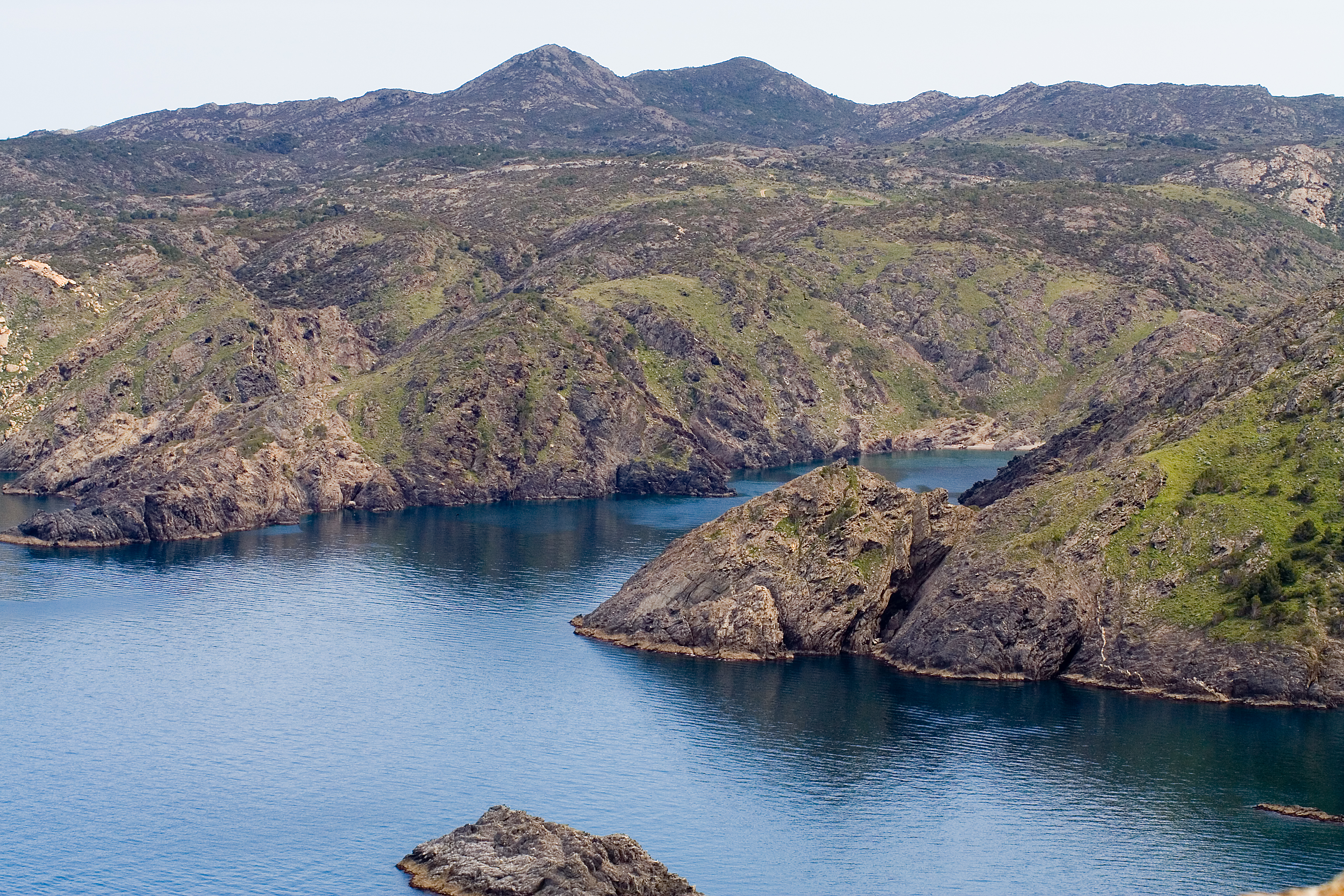
Another view of El Golfet from Cap Gros, Cap de Creus.

The Cap de Creus (Cabo de Creus in Spanish) is a peninsula and a headland located at the far northeast of Catalonia, some 25 kilometres (16 mi) south from the French border. The cape lies in the municipal area of Cadaqués, and the nearest large town is Figueres, the capital of the Alt Empordà and the birthplace of Salvador Dalí. Cap de Creus is the easternmost point of Catalonia and therefore of mainland Spain and the Iberian Peninsula.

The area is now a natural park.

The peninsula has an area of 190 square kilometres (73 sq mi) of an extraordinary landscape value; a wind-beaten very rocky dry region, with almost no trees, in contrast with a seaside rich in minuscule creeks of deep blue sea to anchor. Mountains are the eastern foothills of the Pyrenees, the natural border between France and Spain. The region is frequently swept by the awful north wind "tramontana" (beyond mountains) which has caused many naval disasters. Cadaqués is the most well known village, home of artists and writers, with sophisticated atmosphere, near Port Lligat where Dalí built his home in a paradise small bay. (Dalí depicted the peninsula in his paintings The Persistence of Memory and The Great Masturbator.) El Port de la Selva, with a little fishing harbour, is less exploited, with good gastronomic resources and pleasant terraces.

Sant Pere de Rodes stands out at 500 metres (1,600 ft) of altitude, with views of the Cap and the Pyrenees. It is an 11th-century monastery whose first structures date from about 750 AD.

One legend tells that the Cap de Creus was hewn by Hercules.

== Geology ==
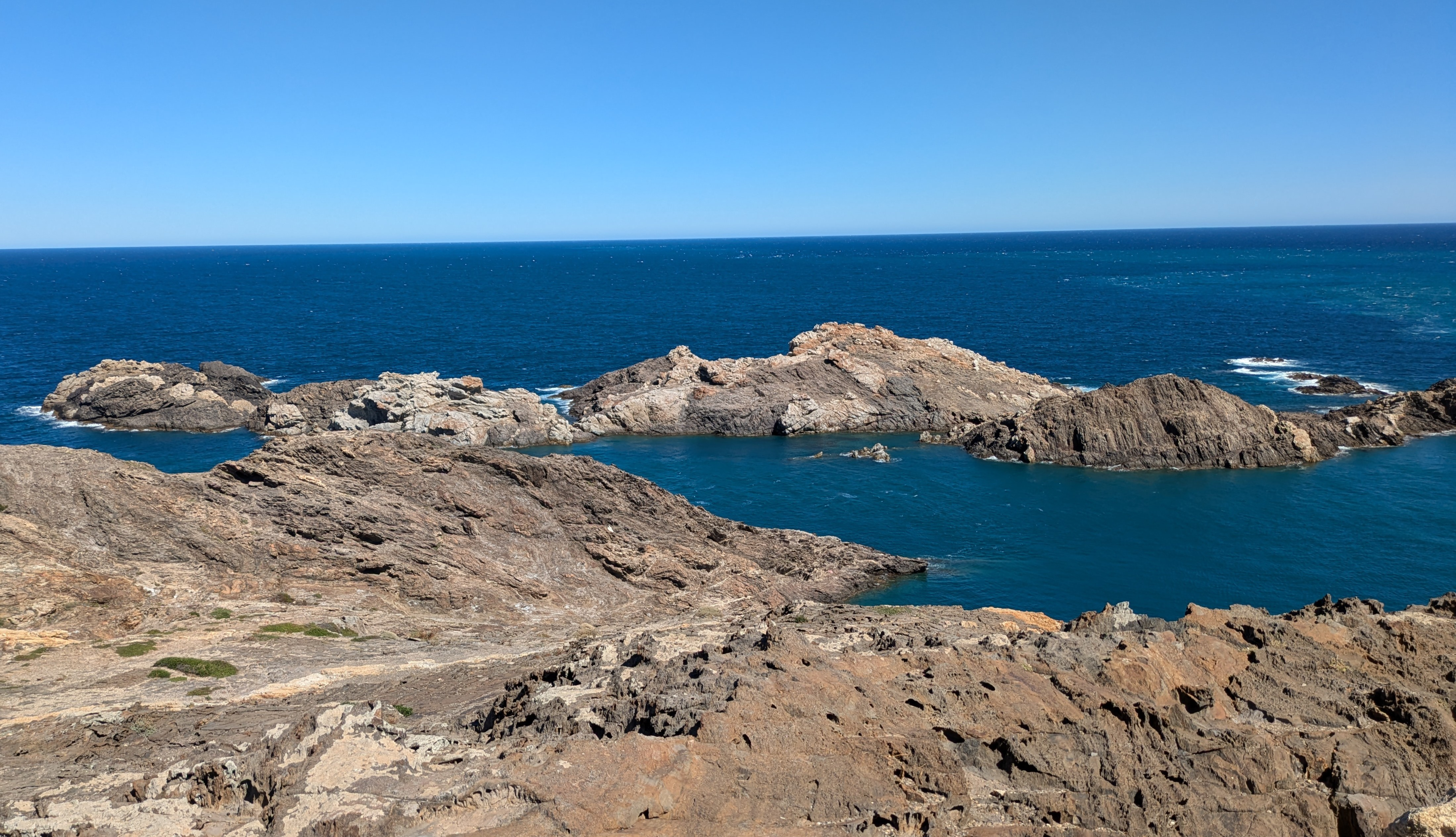
Illa de s'Encalladora (White Island), Cap de Creus. Pegmatite cutting through pre-Cambrian schist.

The Cap de Creus offers many geological exposures of exceptional interest, especially for the study of Variscan intrusions and shear zones. It is rated as "a worldwide reference place for structural geology".

== See also ==
- Extreme points of Catalonia
