= El Port de la Selva =

- Municipality
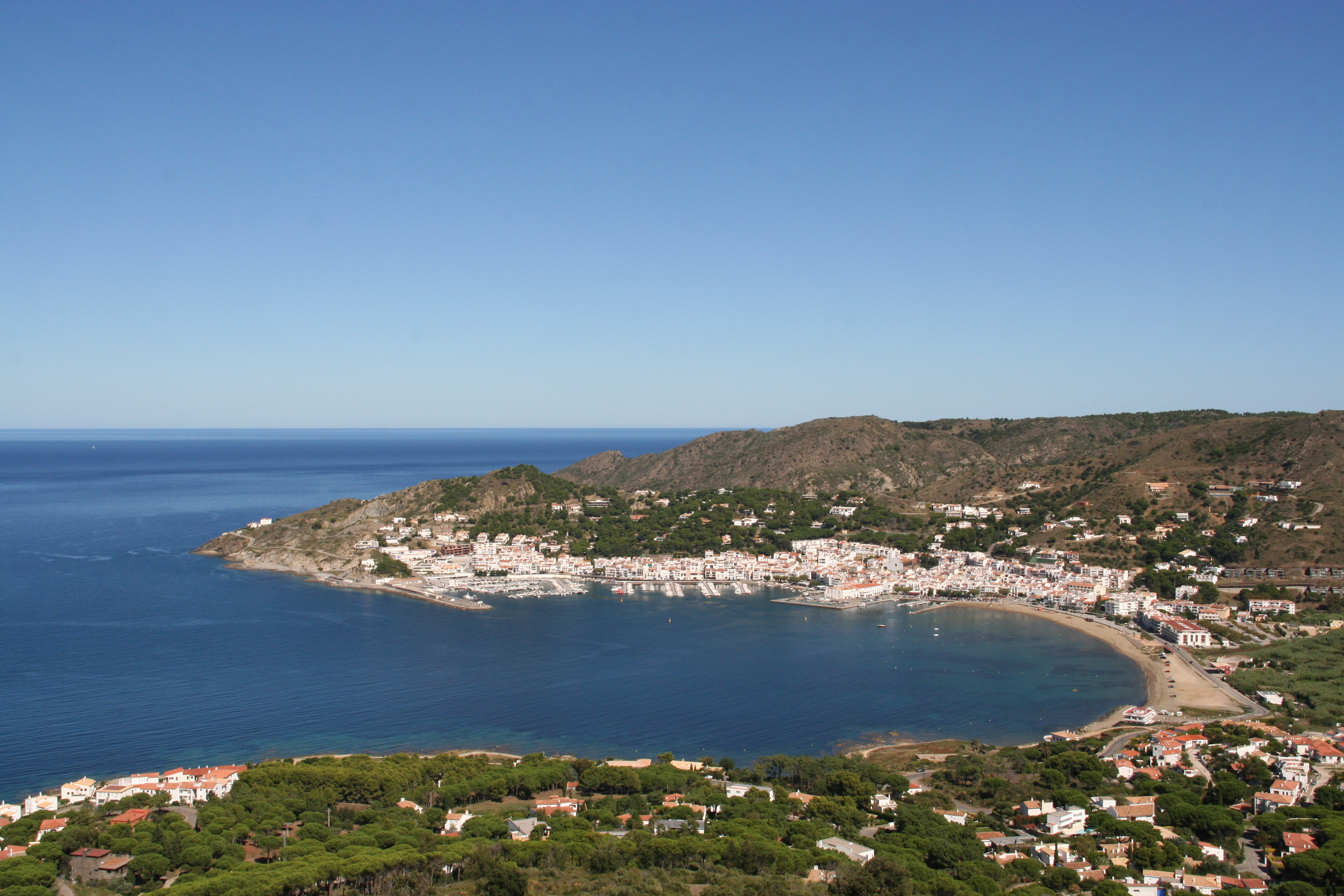

- Coat of arms

- Location in Catalonia El Port de la Selva (Spain)
- Coordinates: 42°20′15″N 3°12′12″E
- Country: Spain
- Community: Catalonia
- Province: Girona
- Comarca: Alt Empordà

Government
  - Mayor: Josep Maria Cervera Pinart (2015)

Area
  - Total: 41.6 km^{2} (16.1 sq mi)
- Elevation: 12 m (39 ft)

Population (2025-01-01)
  - Total: 1,053
  - Density: 25.3/km^{2} (65.6/sq mi)
- Demonym(s): Selvatà, selvatana
- Website: elportdelaselva.cat

El Port de la Selva (Catalan pronunciation: [əl ˈpɔɾ ðə lə ˈsɛlβə]) is a municipality in the comarca of the Alt Empordà in Catalonia, Spain, on the Costa Brava. It is situated on the northern coast of the Cap de Creus and is an important fishing port and tourist centre. The romanesque abbey of Sant Pere de Rodes is particularly notable.

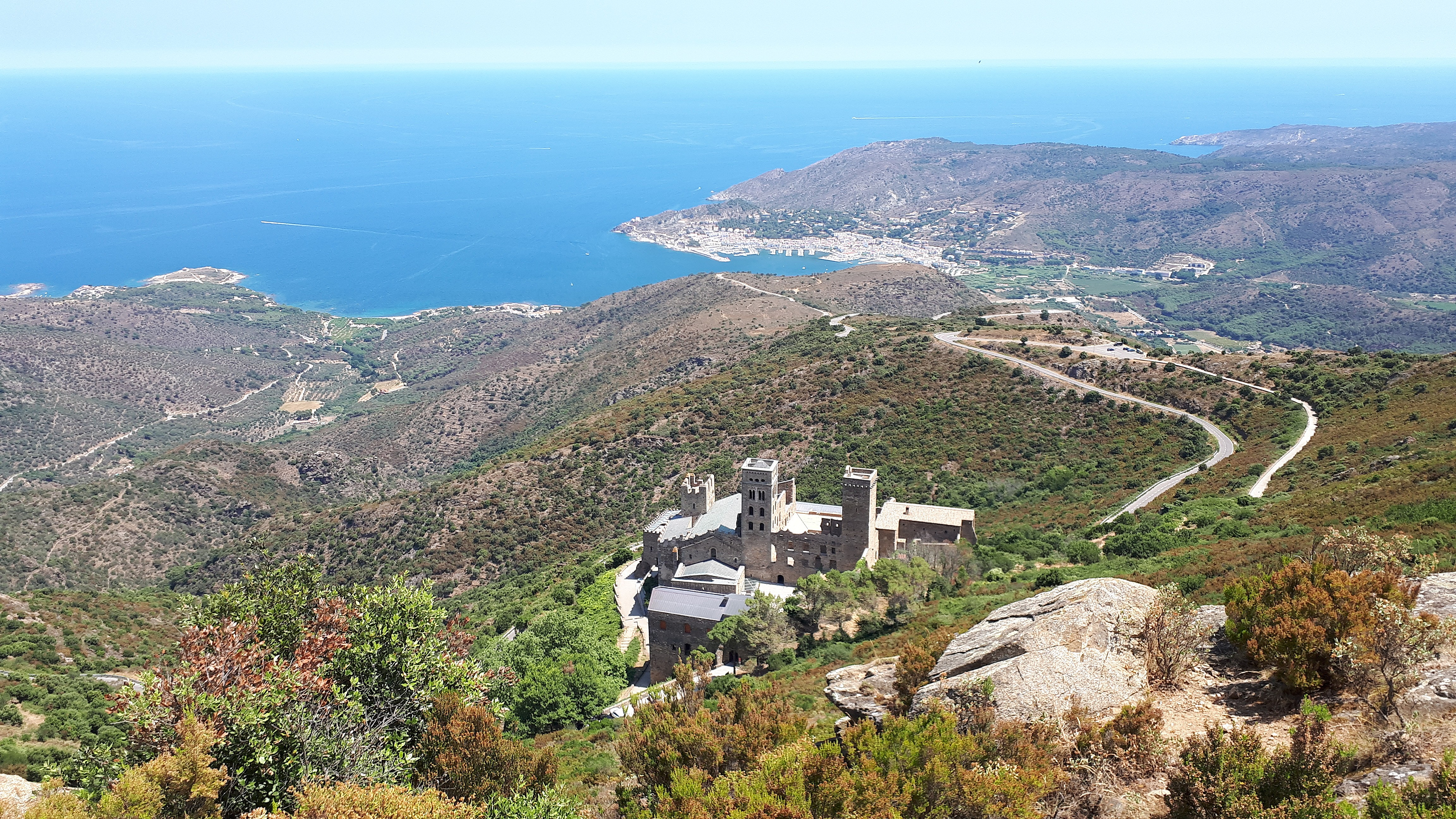
El Port de la Selva, seen from above the abbey of Sant Pere de Rodes.

== Demography ==
1900	1930	1950	1970	1986	2007
1441	1050	901	958	768	947
