= Sant Pere de Rodes =

Former Benedictine monastery in Catalonia, Spain

Coordinates: 42°19′25″N 3°10′00″E

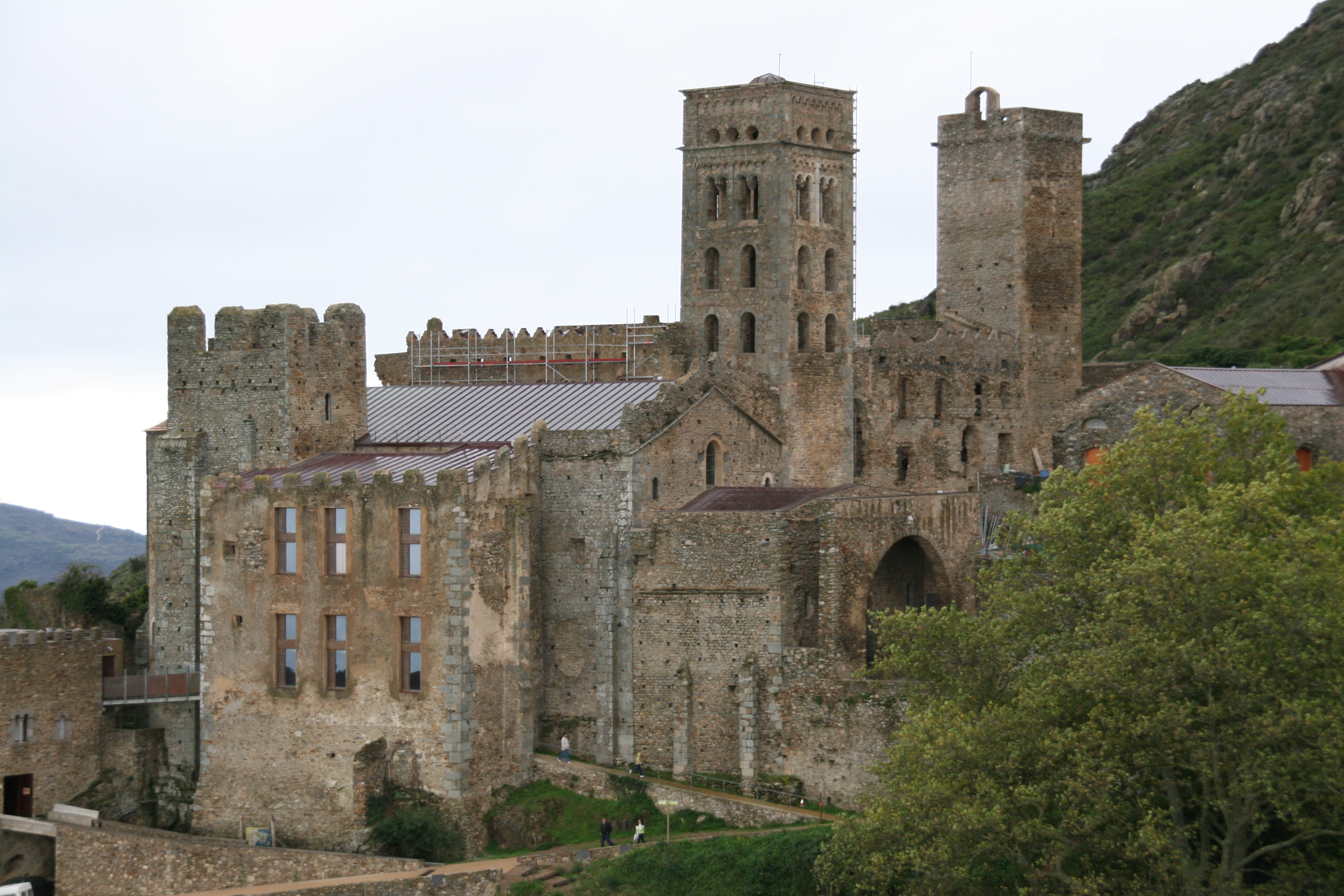
Monastery of Sant Pere de Roda

Sant Pere de Roda (Catalan pronunciation: [ˈsam ˈpeɾə ðə ˈrɔðəs]) is a former Benedictine monastery in the comarca of Alt Empordà, in the North East of Catalonia, Spain.

== Location ==
Located in the municipal area of El Port de la Selva in the province of Girona, Spain, it was built on the slope of the Verdera Mountain, just below the Castle of Sant Verdera, which provided protection for the monastery but now lies in ruins at the very summit. It offers exceptional views over the bay of Llançà, to the north of Cap de Creus. Near the monastery Santa Creu de Roda are the ruins of a medieval town, of which its pre-Romanesque-style church dedicated to Saint Helena is all that remains.

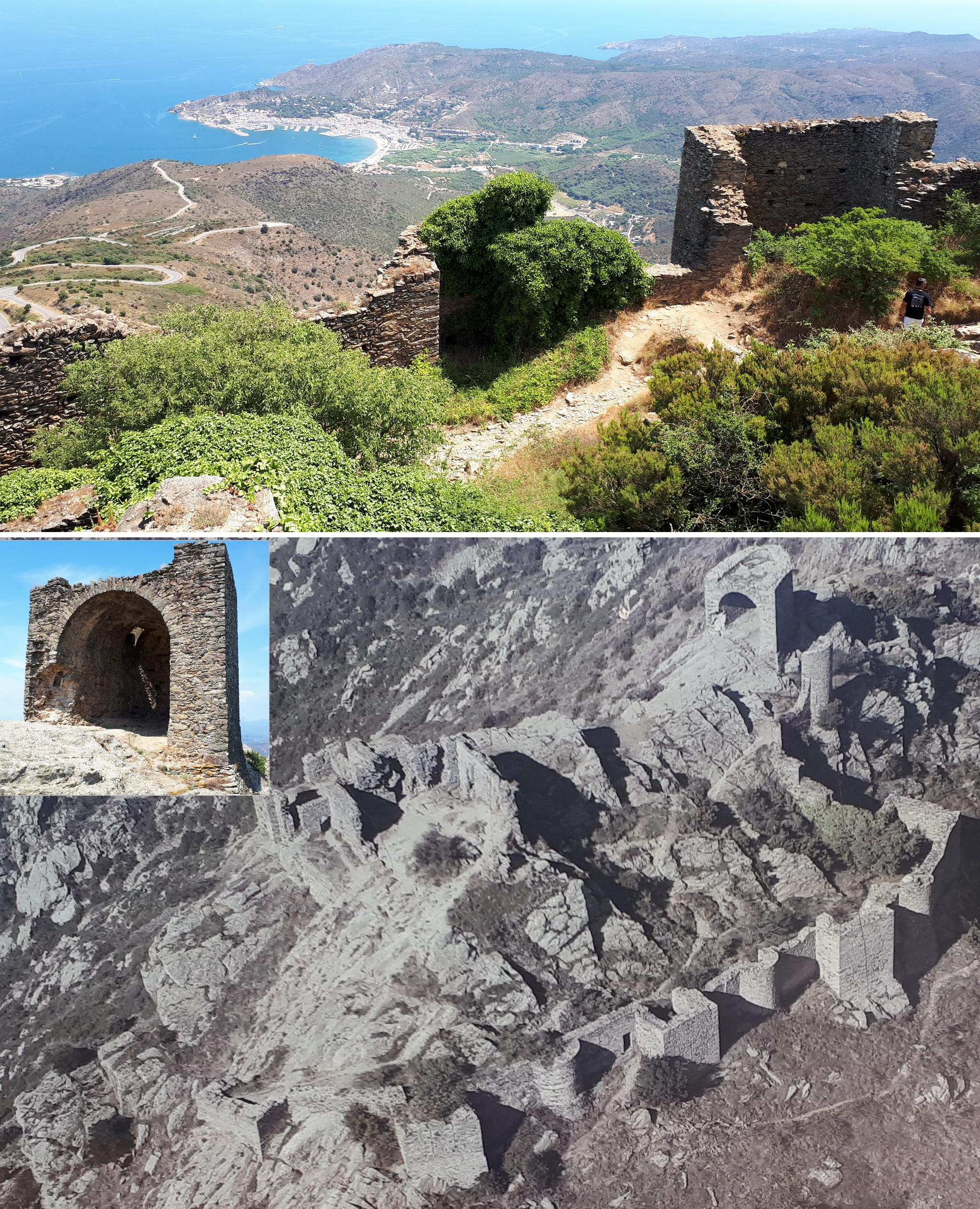
Verdera Castle (inset: north tower).

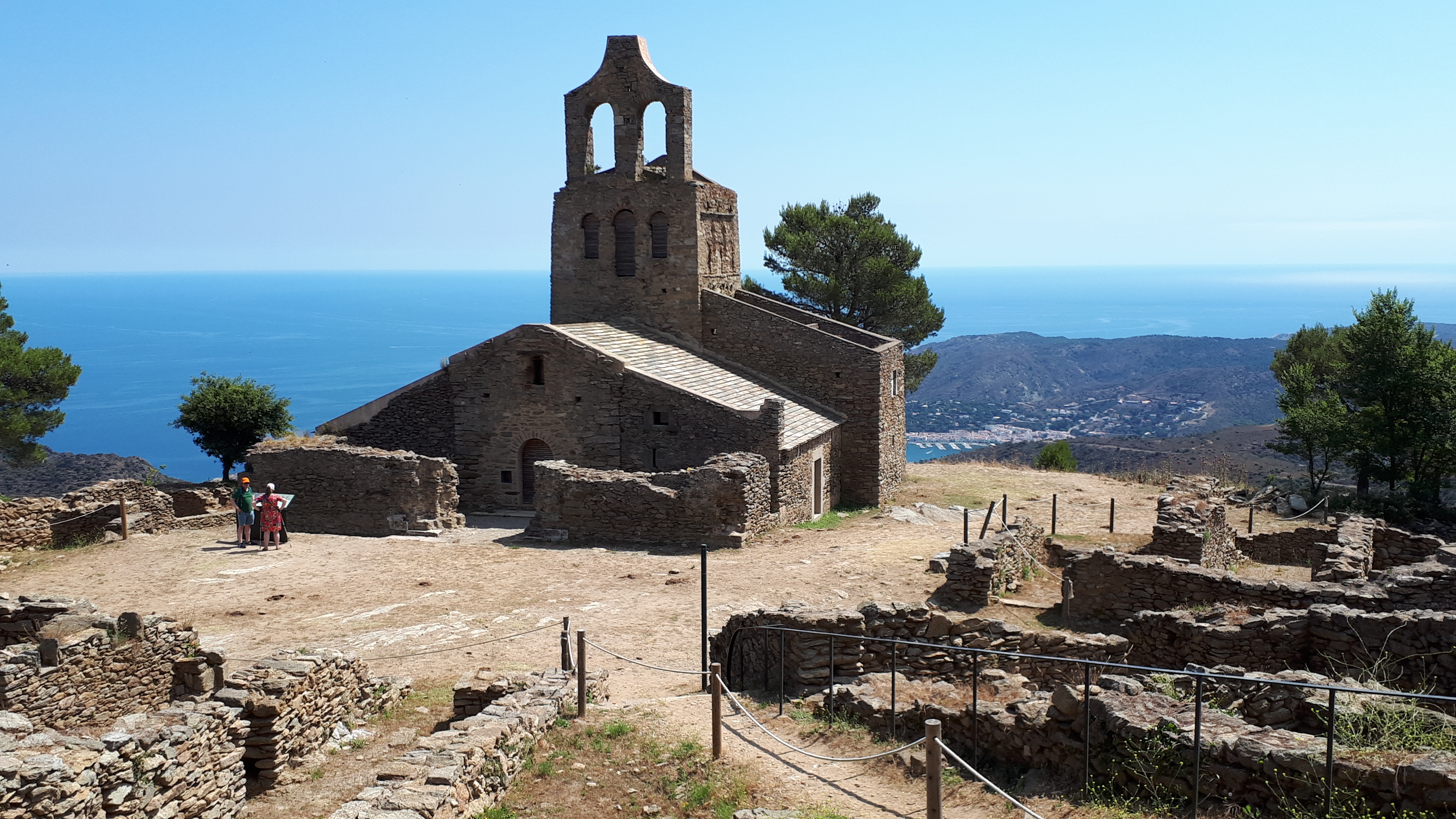
Santa Helena church, and remains of the medieval settlement at Santa Creu de Rodes.

== History ==
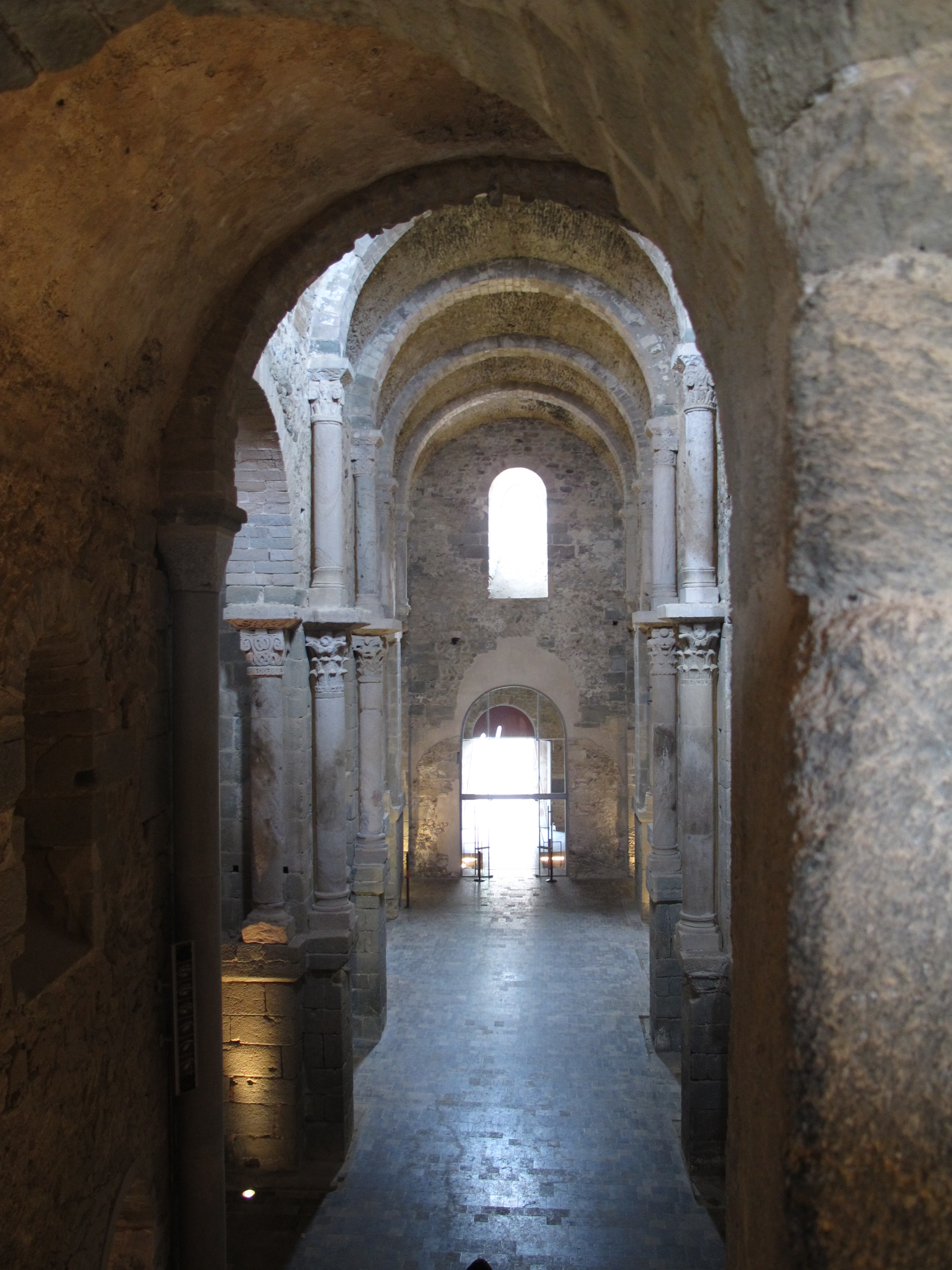
Sant Pere de Roda's nave

The true origin of the monastery is not known, which has given rise to speculation and legend; such as its foundation by monks who disembarked in the area with the remains of Saint Peter and other saints, to save them from the "Barbarian hordes" that were invading the Western Roman Empire. Once the danger had passed, the Pope Boniface IV commanded them to build a monastery.

The first documentation of the existence of the monastery dates 878, when it was mentioned as a simple monastery cell consecrated to Saint Peter, but it is not until 945 when an independent Benedictine monastery was founded, led by an abbot. Connected with the County of Empúries, it reached its maximum splendor between the 11th and 12th centuries until its final decay in the 17th century. Its increasing importance is reflected in its status as a point of pilgrimage.

In the 17th century it was sacked on several occasions and in 1793 was deserted by the Benedictine community, which was transferred to Vila-sacra and finally settled in Figueres in 1809, until the monastery community was dissolved.

The monastery was declared a national monument in 1930. In 1935 the first restoration work was initiated.

== Architecture ==
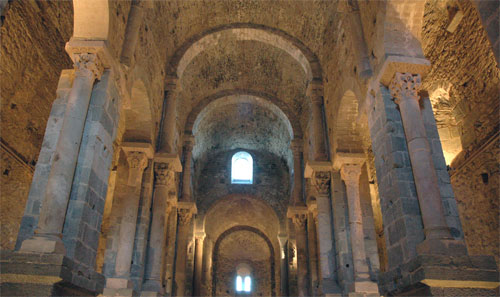
Inside of the church

The buildings are constructed in terraces, given its location. Cloisters of 12th century form the central part of the complex. Around them the rest of constructions are distributed. The church, consecrated in the year 1022, is an example of Romanesque style; it has nave and two vaulted ceilings. These are bordered by a double column with capitals influenced by the Carolingian style. The double column support arches separating the nave from the aisles. Columns and pillars have been taken from a former Roman building. The nave ends with an arch leading to the apse, continued in the two aisles. Under the apse is a crypt. The church synthesizes a number of original styles including Carolingian, Romanesque and Roman. The monastery is considered one of the best examples of Romanesque architecture in Catalonia. In the western facade of the monastery is a 12th-century square-shaped bell tower, influenced by the Lombard style from the previous century. To the side is a defensive tower, that was probably begun in the 10th century but finished later after several modifications.
