= Sant Antoni de Calonge =

- Town
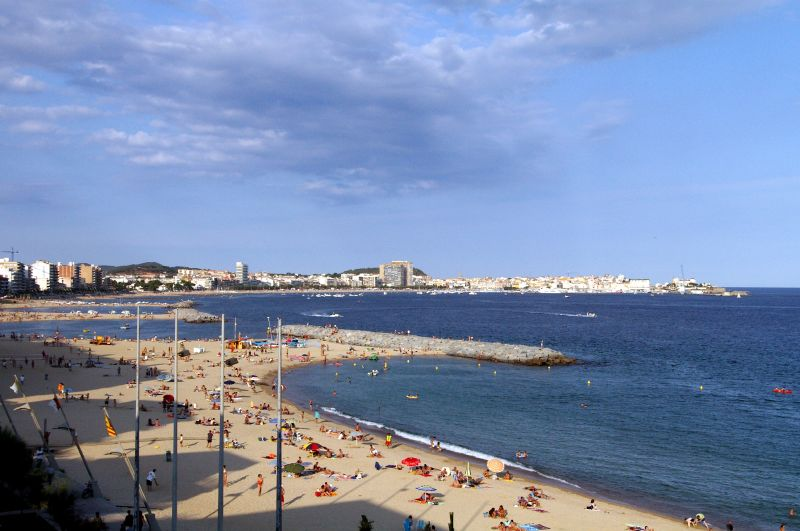
- Sant Antoni de Calonge

- Coat of arms

- Location within Province of Girona Location within Catalonia Location within Spain
- Coordinates: 41°50′47″N 3°05′56″E
- Country: Spain
- Community: Catalonia
- Province: Girona
- Comarca: Baix Empordà
- Municipality: Calonge
- Time zone: UTC+1 (CET)
  - Summer (DST): UTC+2 (CEST)
- Website: http://www.calonge.cat

Sant Antoni de Calonge (Catalan pronunciation: [ˌsant ənˈtɔni ðə kəˈlɔɲʒə]) is a town which forms part of the city of Calonge. It is located in the comarca of the Baix Empordà in Catalonia, Spain. The town was built along the rocky coastline of northern Spain. There is a seaside promenade that connects many neighboring towns. Sant Antoni de Calonge is between Platja d'Aro and Palamós.

== History ==
=== Pre-history ===
In ancient times, Sant Antoni de Calonge served as a summer retreat for the Romans. Construction on the fortress in Calonge dates back to the 8th century. The church of St. Daniel and a Roman road are the two oldest buildings of architectural value still standing in Sant Antoni. The church of St Daniel dates back to the sixteenth or seventeenth century. Additionally, there are some ruins, megaliths, Chalcolithic burial caves, and ancient artifacts scattered across the coastline and housed in the Archaeological Museum of Calonge. This archaeological evidence suggests the area was inhabited during the periods of Prehistoric Iberia and the Roman Empire.

=== Modern history ===
Sant Antoni did not begin to develop as a separate town until fishing villages began populating the Spanish coast in the late eighteenth century with the decline of piracy. With few ancient structures to impede development, most buildings in Sant Antoni are from the twentieth century, although some homes date back to the eighteenth and nineteenth centuries. The Neo-Gothic church of Saint Anthony was built in 1936. Sant Antoni de Calonge is now under the municipality of Calonge. However, it was an autonomous town in 1936 under the name, San Antonio de Mar and later Levantine Sea. This autonomy only lasted during the Spanish Civil War, from 1936 until 1939.

== Tourism ==
In summer Sant Antoni de Calonge draws crowds of water sport enthusiasts and vacationers from across Catalonia.

In 2011 Sant Antoni de Calonge hosted a photo contest which utilized five giant frames located around the city. These frames are still in place and serve as markers for many of the most picturesque scenes in Sant Antoni.

The GR 92 long distance footpath, which runs the length of the Mediterranean coast of Spain, passes along the seafront promenade of Sant Antoni de Calonge. To the north the path continues along the promenade to Palamós, whilst to the south it follows the rocky coastline and crosses several beaches to reach the northern end of the beach at Platja d'Aro.
