= Camí de Ronda =

Footpath in Northern Catalonia

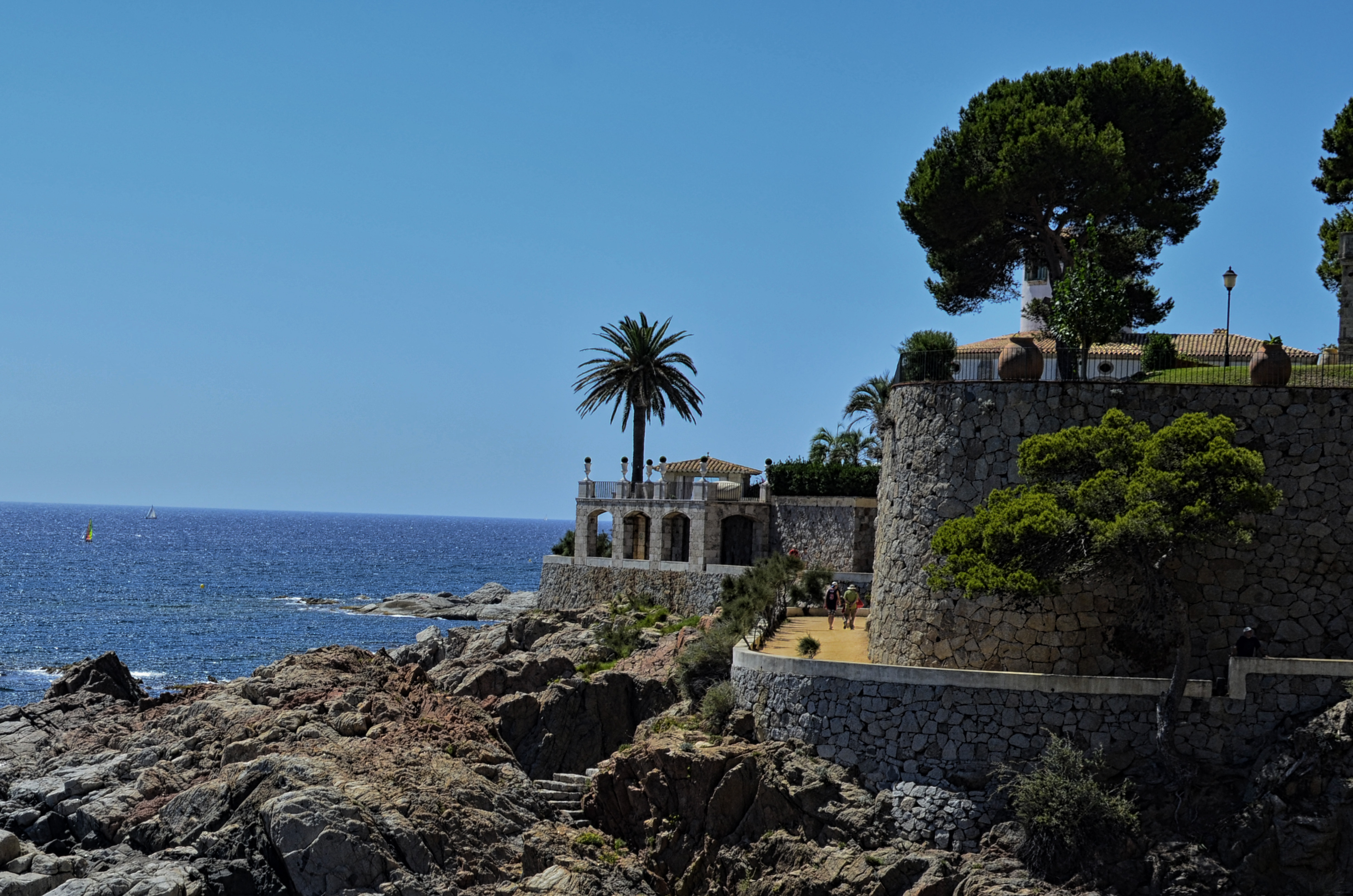
Cami De Ronda

The Camí de Ronda (Catalan pronunciation: [kəˈmi ðə ˈrondə], Spanish: Camino de Ronda) is a footpath along the Costa Brava coast. It was originally built to help the Carabineros, and subsequently the Guardia Civil, control the coast and stop smuggling (ex. tobacco, alcohol, penicillin, pepper, sugar, chocolate, makeup, lingerie). Today, the footpath is used by hikers instead.

Although the construction date is uncertain, we can imagine it is a millenary path used for seaside communication. More concrete, origins date back to the 19th century when it was formed from small footpaths through the cliffs along the coast of Catalonia. In the 20th century, especially in the postwar period, the path acquired great importance as method of border control, especially in the difficult economic conditions of Spain after the Spanish Civil War.

However, corruption ensured the route did not stop smuggling. The continuing border controls and economic situation in the 1940s and 1950s, when even basic foods, tools and other products were in short supply in Spain, allowed the few smugglers to amass fortunes. The improvement of the Spanish economy and eventual entry into the European Union ensured the path lost its importance.

With the decline of the smuggling trade, the Camí de Ronda became an important area for fishing and mussel foraging, as well as sheep herding.

Today, much of the route is a series of public footpaths often connecting beaches and resorts, and some of these are used as part of the GR 92 long-distance footpath that runs the length of the Mediterranean coast of Spain.

== Bibliography ==
- Punseti, Daniel; Rovira, Iban; Camí de Ronda, La Travessa a peu de la Costa Brava, Ruta lineal, Triptek Books-Camí de Ronda® (2014, 2015 & 2016 last edition), Map E/1:25.000 Guide in English, Catalan, Español, French, German ISBN ISBN 978-8460860808 - www.camideronda.com
