= Empordà =

Coordinates: 42°04′55″N 3°04′19″E

- Natural region
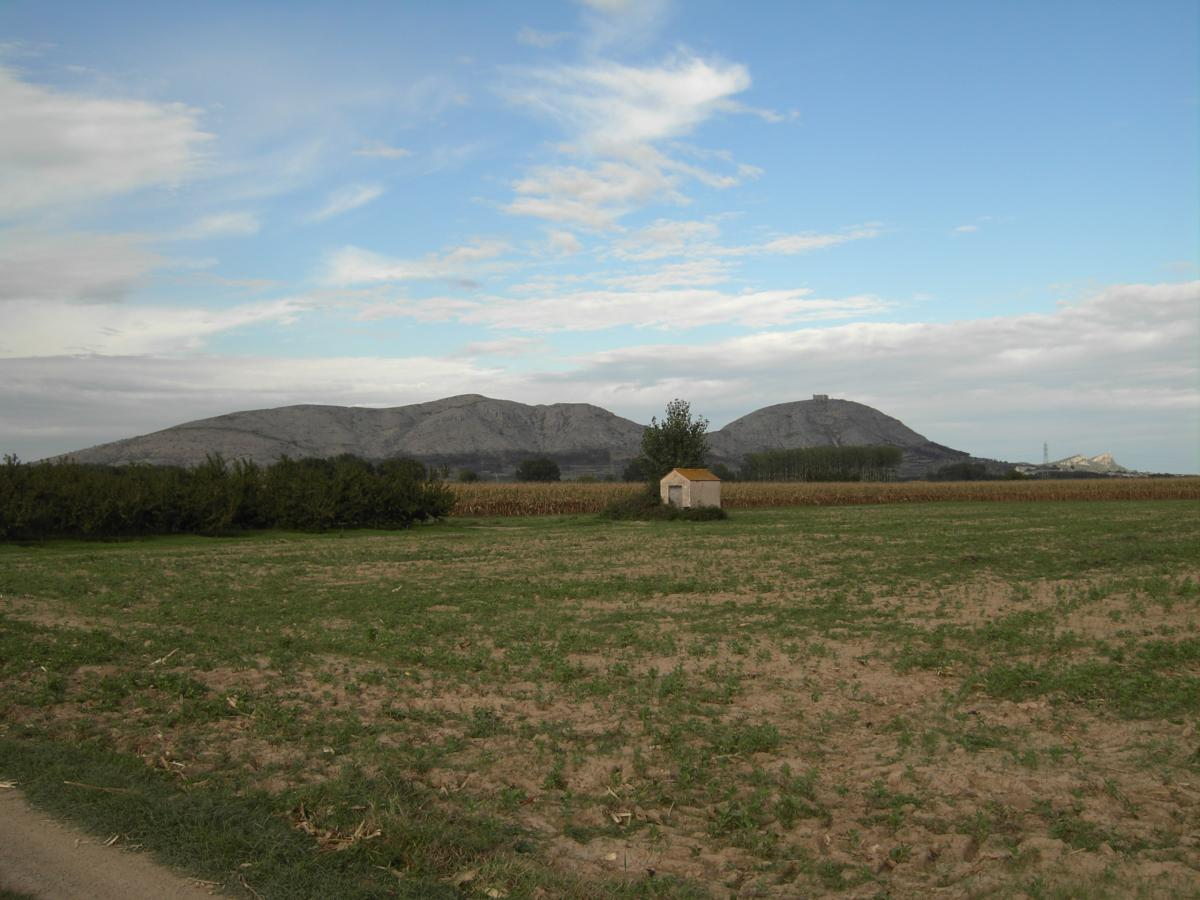
- Landscape of the Montgrí Massif in the Empordà region.

- A map of Catalonia showing the Empordà location
- Country: Catalonia, Spain
- Elevation: 40 m (130 ft)

Empordà (Catalan: [əmpurˈda]; Spanish: Ampurdán [ampuɾˈðan]) is a natural and historical region of Catalonia, Spain, divided since 1936 into two comarques, Alt Empordà and Baix Empordà.

The city of Figueres, an important urban and economic center of the Empordà, was designated the capital of Alt Empordà, while La Bisbal d'Empordà, following a more geographic and historical criteria, became the capital of Baix Empordà.

Empordà has been the cradle for many pictoric schools, with surrealism standing out, including artists such as Salvador Dalí, Angel Planells, Joan Massanet and Evarist Vallès.

== Etymology ==
The name Empordà is a derivative of Empúries (Empòrion in Old Greek or Emporiae in Latin), which means "the markets".

The name Empordà comes from a succession of phonetic derivatives of County of Empúries, a county which had its capital first in Sant Martí d'Empúries and then in Castelló d'Empúries the capital of medieval Empordà during the period of political splendor of this county. This was one of the most insurgent toward royal power and one of the last ones to join the Crown of Aragon, which led to a few odd episodes such as the deviation of the Ter (river) or the unfinished build of the Montgrí Castle on top of the Montgrí Massif.

The Baix Empordà born writer Josep Pla used to refer to the surroundings of his native Palafrugell as Empordanet, or the region that goes in between the Gavarres and the Montgrí, and that name is still used today to refer to the Baix Empordà.

== History ==
The region was already inhabited in the prehistory. There are a number of caves that served as a shelter for Paleolithic men in the Montgrí Massif; the most famous ones share the same name: "Cau Del Duc", one in Torroella and the other in Ullà. We also find important megalithic structures in Massís de les Gavarres or Massís de Cadiretes, as well as the dolmens in Fitor.

The Greeks established themselves very close to the actual region, in Roses (possibly a colony of Rhodes, though this is uncertain) in the 8th century BC and in Empúries at the beginning of the 6th century BC.

The Iberians built one of their main cities in Ullastret in the 6th century BC; the name of the tribe was Indigetes. But with the arrival of the Romans, a process of transformation was initiated that changed the occupational system and the economic exploitation of the territory, which led to the abandonment of Ullastret in the 2nd century BC.

The Baix Empordà was Romanized like all other places of the Roman Empire but that was followed by barbaric invasions in the 3rd and 5th centuries that notably impoverished the region and reduced their urban centers to the minimum expression.

There are many traces of the Romanization, but it is hard to envision the print of the Visigoths and the Arabs, because the proximity of the Kingdom of the Franks caused the creation of independent counties ruled by feudal lords. The Muslim invasion actually lasted less than sixty years (714–785) and the old Hispano-Gothic population came back.

The administrative division of the Carolingian Empire divided the conquered Catalan territory in counties. While the north of the county and the current Alt Empordà was organised around the county of Empúries, the rest were regions or sub-regions of the Bishop of Girona, owner of extensive lands—especially in the Baix Empordà-, or baronies from branches of the Cardona vinculated to the county, to then be the maritime center of the county of Girona, from Begur to Sant Feliu de Guíxols. The first "drassanes" or shipyards where found in Empordà in the 10th century, as well as in Tortosa in 945, then ruled by Abd al-Rahman III.
