= GR 92 =

Hiking trail in Spain

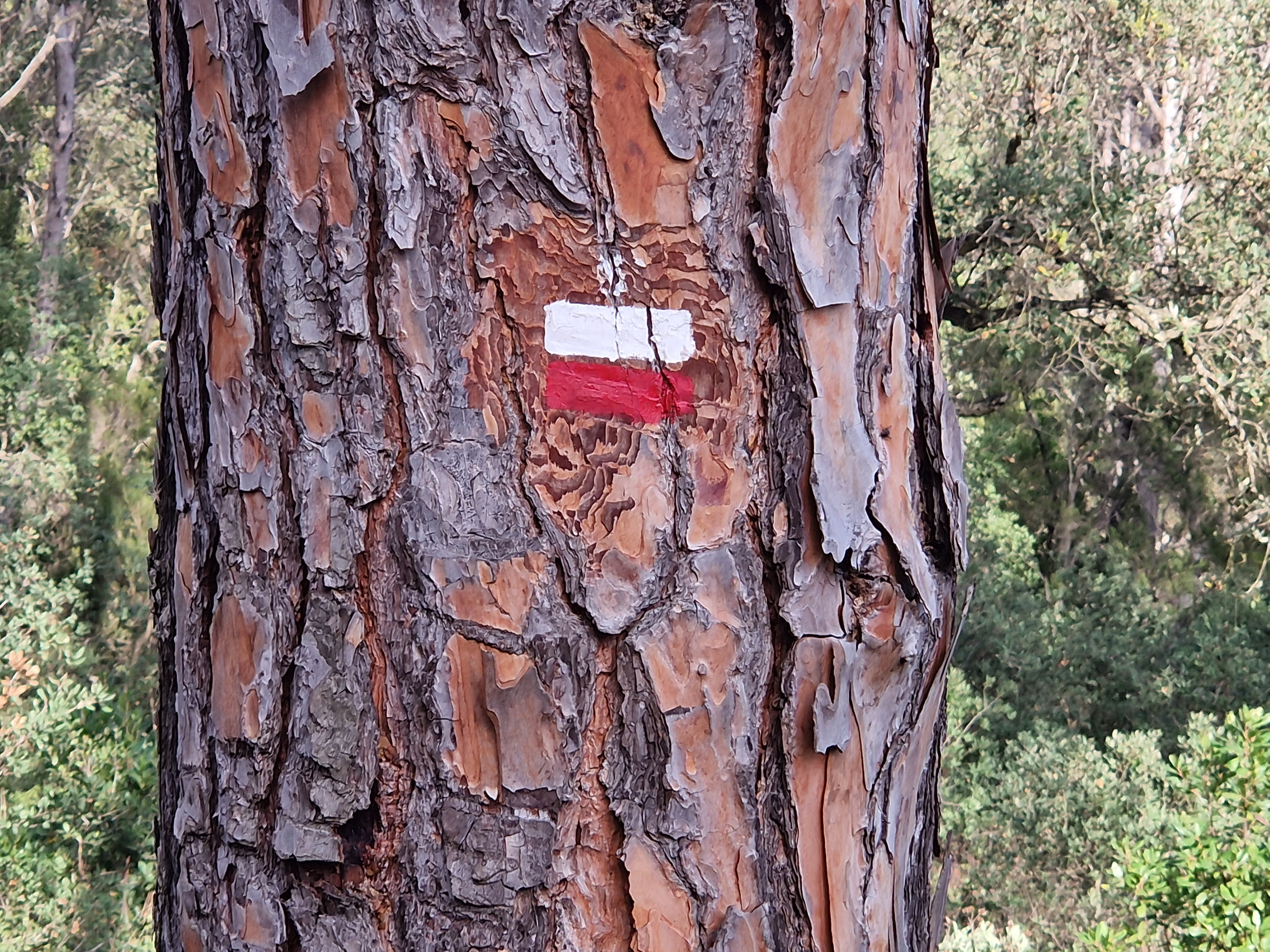
- GR 92 waymark on tree between Tamariu and Fornells
- Location: Mediterranean coast of Spain
- Designation: GR footpath
- Trailheads: Portbou, Tarifa
- Use: Hiking

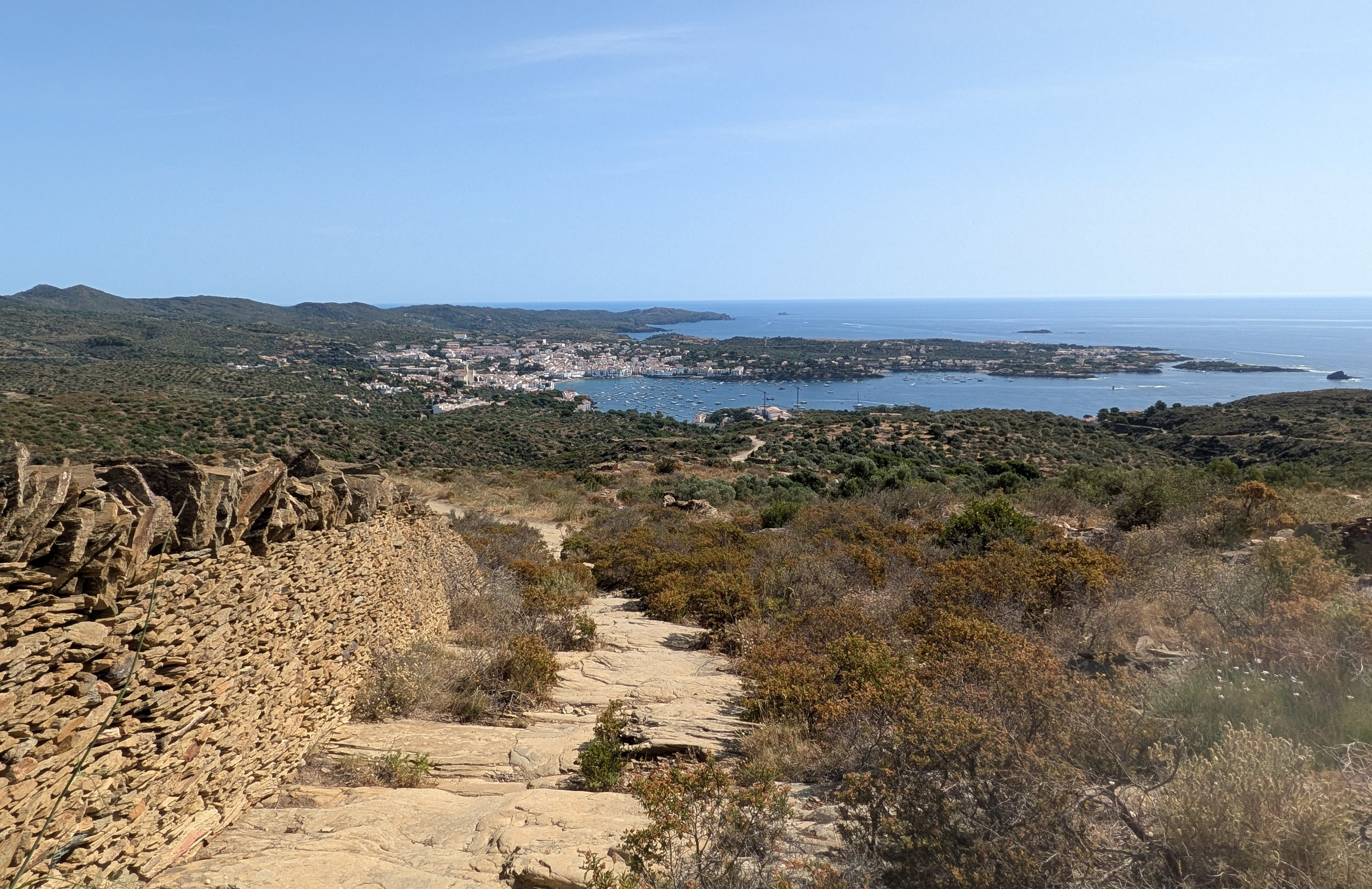
On stage 3 of the GR 92 long-distance path, looking down to Cadaqués.

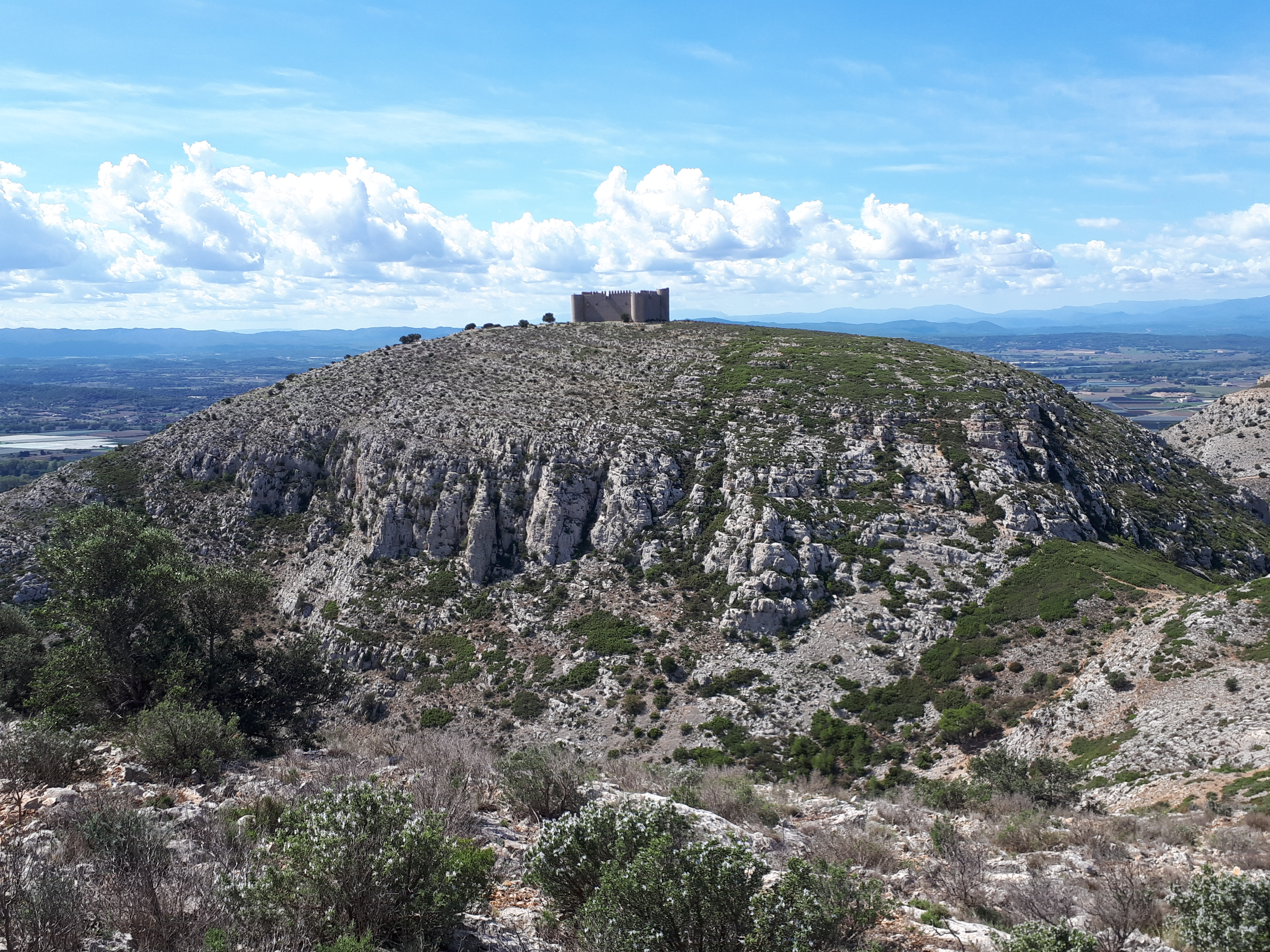
Stage 6 of the GR 92 long-distance path in Catalonia crosses the col on the right-hand side of the picture, then climbs the cliff beyond to arrive at Montgrí castle.

The GR 92 is part of the extensive GR footpath network of paths, tracks and trails in Spain. It will eventually run the length of the Mediterranean coast of Spain, from Portbou, on the border with France to Tarifa, the southernmost point of Spain. In doing so it will pass through the autonomous communities of Catalonia, Valencia, Murcia and Andalusia. The sections in Catalunya and Murcia are complete and fully signposted, but work is still in progress on the sections in Valencia and Andalusia, and sources differ on the eventual length of the path.

The GR 92 forms the southern portion of the E10, one of the European long-distance paths. The E10 runs between Finland and Spain.

== In Catalonia ==
The section of the GR 92 in Catalonia runs from Portbou to Pont de l'Olivar. It is way marked throughout, and is 583 kilometres (362 mi) in length, broken down into 31 stages. The northernmost of these stages, running through the Costa Brava, were in part adapted from the Camí de Ronda, a path originally constructed to help control the coast and stop smuggling.

The stages are:

Stage	Route	Distance
1	Portbou–Llançà	9.8 kilometres (6.1 mi)
2	Llançà–Cadaqués	20.3 kilometres (12.6 mi)
3	Cadaqués–Roses	21.7 kilometres (13.5 mi)
4	Roses–El Cortalet pond in the Parc Natural dels Aiguamolls de l'Empordà	16.3 kilometres (10.1 mi)
5	El Cortalet pond–Sant Martí d'Empúries	20.2 kilometres (12.6 mi)
6	Sant Martí d'Empúries–l'Escala–Castell del Montgrí–Torroella de Montgrí	20.0 kilometres (12.4 mi)
7	Torroella de Montgrí–Gualta–Fontanilles–Palau-sator–Pals–Begur	21.3 kilometres (13.2 mi)
8	Begur–Sa Tuna–Fornells–Aiguablava–Tamariu–Llafranc–Calella–S'Alguer–La Fosca–Palamós	23.0 kilometres (14.3 mi)
9	Palamós–Sant Antoni de Calonge–Platja d'Aro–S'Agaró–Sant Feliu de Guíxols	16.8 kilometres (10.4 mi)
10	Sant Feliu de Guíxols–Castell de Montagut–Tossa de Mar	20.2 kilometres (12.6 mi)
11	Tossa de Mar–Lloret de Mar	14.4 kilometres (8.9 mi)
12	Lloret de Mar–Tordera	17.2 kilometres (10.7 mi)
13	Tordera–Hortsavinyà	12.8 kilometres (8.0 mi)
14	Hortsavinyà–Vallgorguina	17.4 kilometres (10.8 mi)
15	Vallgorguina–Coll de Can Bordoi	14.3 kilometres (8.9 mi)
16	Coll de Can Bordoi–Coll de la Font de Cera	23.0 kilometres (14.3 mi)
17	Coll de la Font de Cera–Montcada i Reixac	16.9 kilometres (10.5 mi)
18	Montcada i Reixac–Baixador de Vallvidrera station	16.7 kilometres (10.4 mi)
19	Baixador de Vallvidrera station–Sant Vicenç dels Horts	13.6 kilometres (8.5 mi)
20	Sant Vicenç dels Horts–Bruguers	16.2 kilometres (10.1 mi)
21	Bruguers–Garraf	15.6 kilometres (9.7 mi)
22	Garraf–Vilanova i la Geltrú	22.0 kilometres (13.7 mi)
23	Vilanova i la Geltrú–Calafell	13.4 kilometres (8.3 mi)
24	Calafell–Torredembarra	15.0 kilometres (9.3 mi)
25	Torredembarra–Tarragona	20.0 kilometres (12.4 mi)
26	Tarragona–Cambrils	28.1 kilometres (17.5 mi)
27	Cambrils–L'Hospitalet de l'Infant	16.3 kilometres (10.1 mi)
28	L'Hospitalet de l'Infant–L'Ametlla de Mar	22.8 kilometres (14.2 mi)
29	L'Ametlla de Mar–L'Ampolla	15.3 kilometres (9.5 mi)
30	L'Ampolla–Amposta	16.3 kilometres (10.1 mi)
31	Amposta–Pont de l'Olivar	25.4 kilometres (15.8 mi)

== In Valencia ==
The section of the GR 92 in Valencia runs from Traiguera to Pilar de la Horadada. It has not yet been fully defined or way marked, but has a length of about 425 kilometres (264 mi).

== In Murcia ==
The section of the GR 92 in Murcia runs from El Mojón to Playa de los Cocedores. It has a length of 180 kilometres (110 mi). The section is broken down into 9 stages as follows:

Stage	Route	Distance
1	El Mojón–Playa de la Hita	14.6 kilometres (9.1 mi)
2	Playa de la Hita–Playa El Arenal	12.3 kilometres (7.6 mi)
3	Playa El Arenal–Cabo de Palos–Portmán	37.9 kilometres (23.5 mi)
4	Portmán–Cuatro Caminos	26.9 kilometres (16.7 mi)
5	Cuatro Caminos–La Azohía	31.9 kilometres (19.8 mi)
6	La Azohía–Punta Benza	17.4 kilometres (10.8 mi)
7	Punta Benza–Punta del Siscal	10.7 kilometres (6.6 mi)
8	Punta del Siscal–Cabo Cope	16.7 kilometres (10.4 mi)
9	Cabo Cope–Playa de los Cocedores	11.1 kilometres (6.9 mi)

== In Andalucia ==
The section of the GR 92 in Andalucia runs from San Juan De Los Terreros to Tarifa. Only sections of the path are defined or way marked.
