= Pont de l'Olivar =

Bridge across the Sénia River in Spain

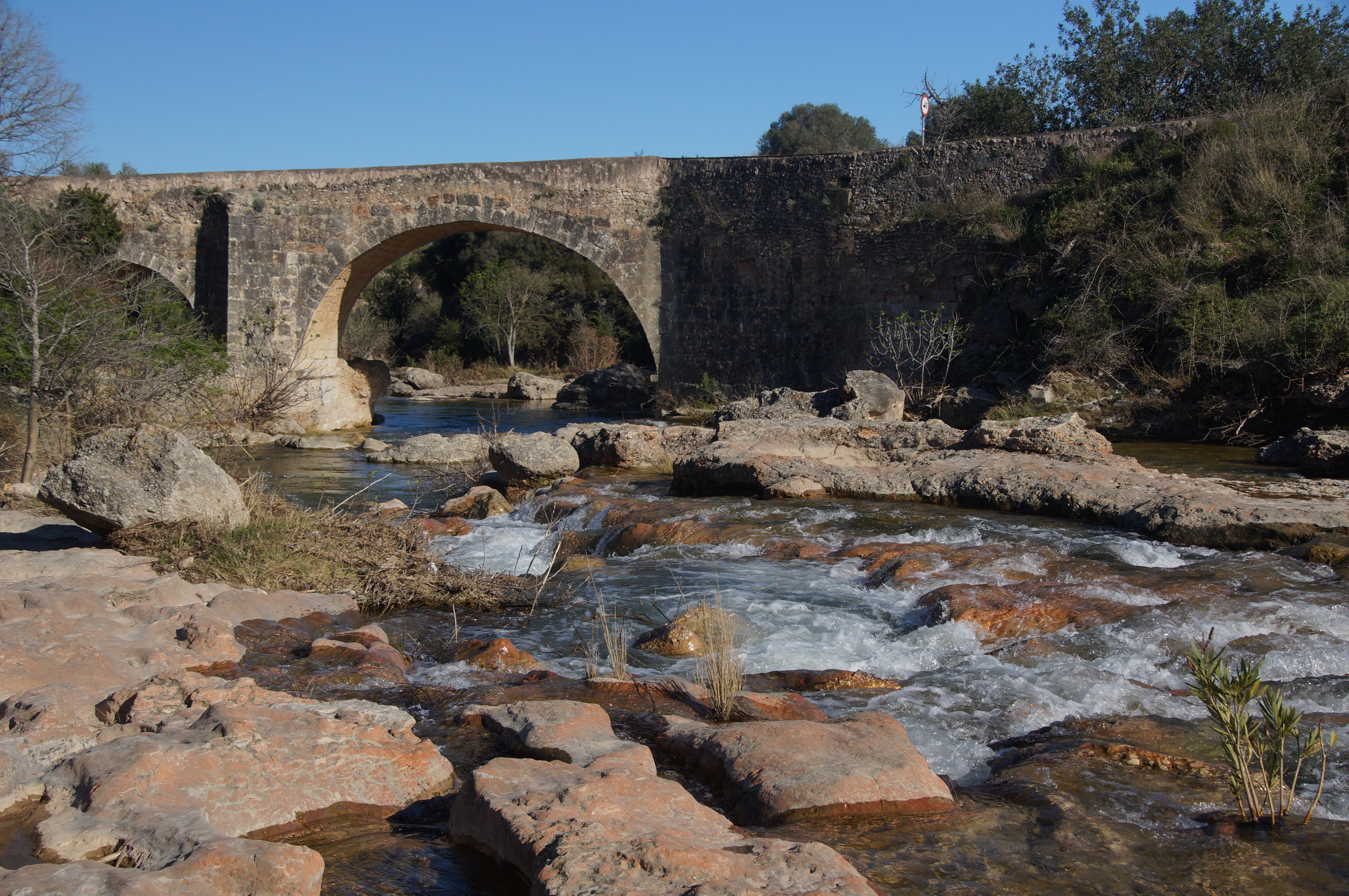
- Coordinates: 40°35′02″N 0°25′28″E
- Carries: GR 92
- Crosses: Sénia River
- Locale: Ulldecona / Vinaròs

The Pont de l'Olivar is a bridge across the Sénia River in Spain. The northern side is in the municipality of Ulldecona, comarca of Montsià, province of Tarragona and autonomous community of Catalonia. The southern side is in the municipality of Vinaròs, comarca of Baix Maestrat, province of Castellón and autonomous community of Valencia. The bridge is included in the Inventory of the Architectural Heritage of Catalonia.

The GR 92 long distance footpath, which roughly follows the length of the Mediterranean coast of Spain, uses the bridge to cross from Catalonia to Valencia. Stage 31 of the Catalonian section of the path links northwards to Amposta, a distance of 25.4 kilometres (15.8 mi). The section of the GR 92 in Valencia has not yet been fully defined or way marked.
