= Medes Islands =

Illes Medes
- Islands
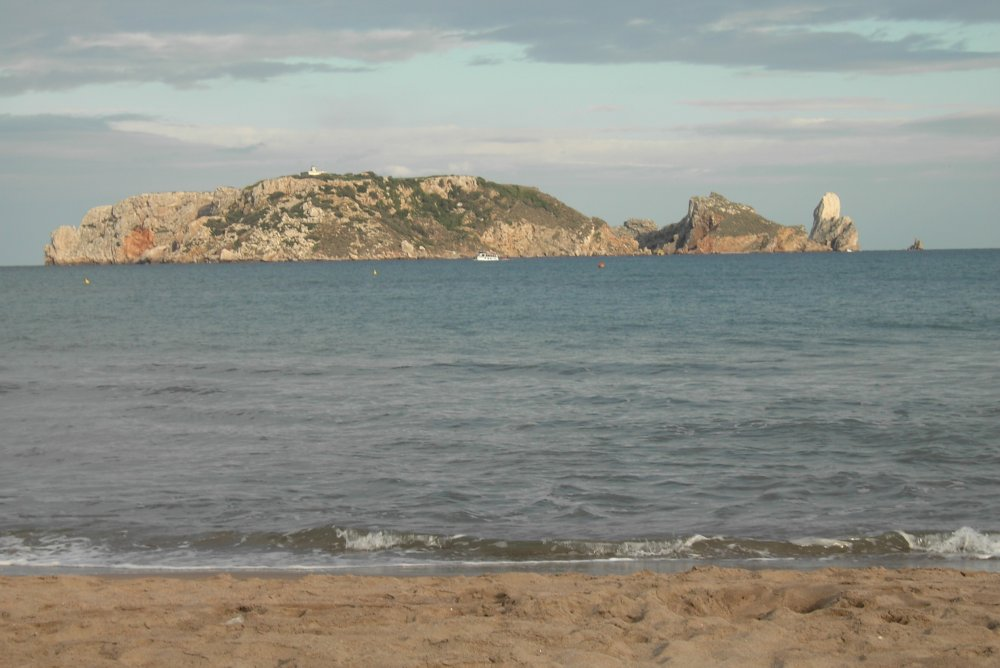
- Illes Medes seen from L'Estartit beach. Meda gran is in the forefront, taking over most of the silhouette

- Location in the Province of Girona Location in Catalonia Location in Spain
- Coordinates: 42°03′00″N 03°13′15″E
- Country: Spain
- Autonomous community: Catalonia
- Province: Girona
- Comarca: Baix Empordà
- Municipality: Torroella de Montgrí

Area
  - Total: 0.215 km^{2} (0.083 sq mi)
- Highest elevation: 75 m (246 ft)

Population (2009)
  - Total: no permanent population
- Time zone: UTC+1 (CET)
  - Summer (DST): UTC+2 (CEST)

The Illes Medes (Catalan: Illes Medes, Spanish: Islas Medas) is a small and craggy group of seven islets in the Costa Brava area of the northwestern Mediterranean Sea. Administratively, the Medes Archipelago belongs to the Baix Empordà comarca, Catalonia, Spain. The islands are protected as a nature reserve; scubadiving is popular but is thus regulated there and requires permission.

The islands are located close to the shore, east of the coastal town of L'Estartit.

== Islands ==
- Meda Gran, the largest island in the group, has an area of 0.18 km^{2} (0.1 sq mi) and is the only island of a considerable size. It has some Mediterranean vegetation and a 19th-century lighthouse on it. The lighthouse was built on La Meda Gran in 1866; it had a resident lighthouse keeper until 1932, when the installation of an automatic light made him redundant. Currently the island has a solar-powered automatic lighthouse.
- Meda Xica, the second largest island, has a total surface of only 0.02 km^{2} (0.01 sq mi).
- Carall (or Cavall) Bernat, Tascons Grossos, Medellot, Tascons Petits and Ferrenelles are mere steep rocky outcrops jutting out from the sea.

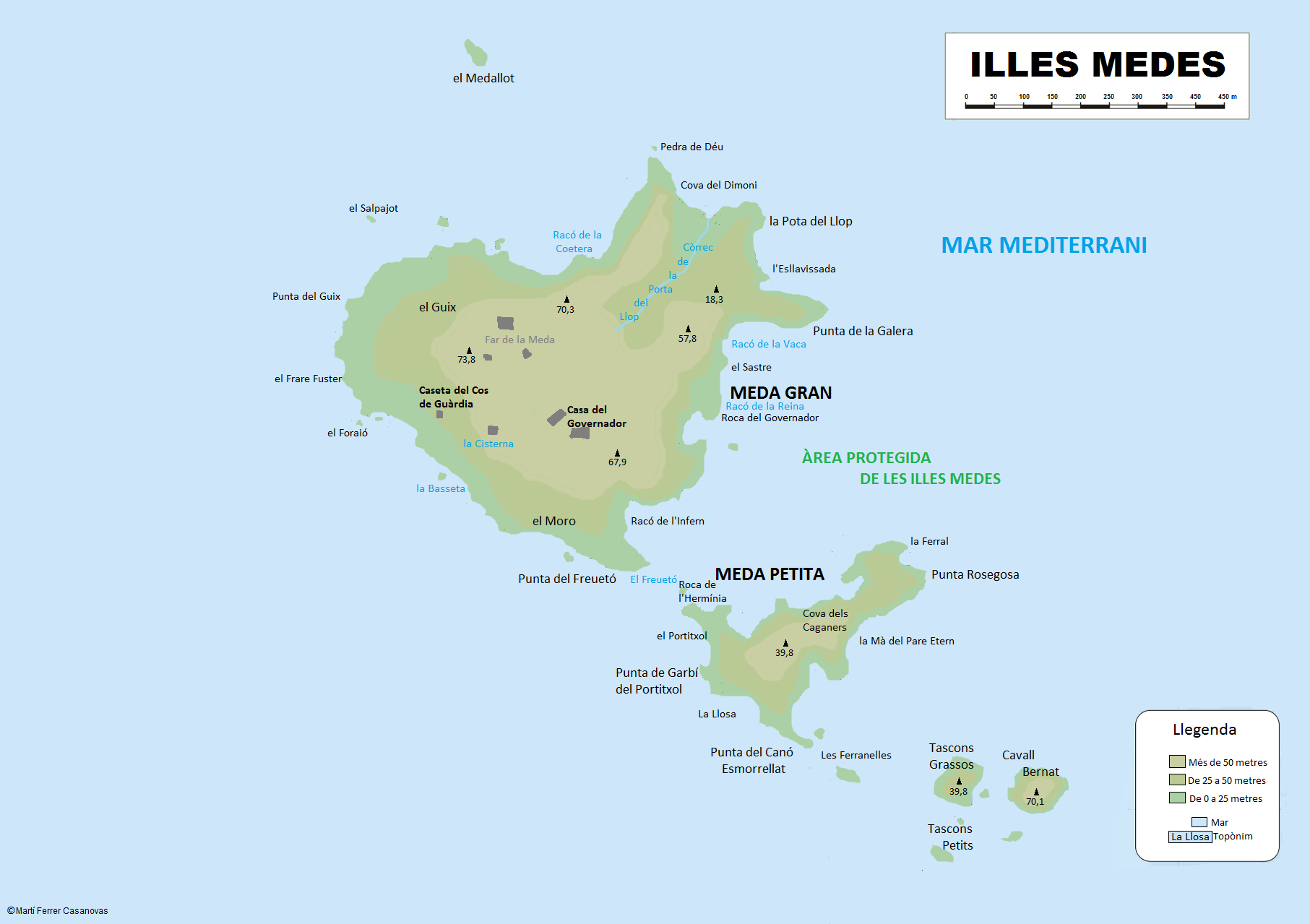
Topographic map of Medes Islands

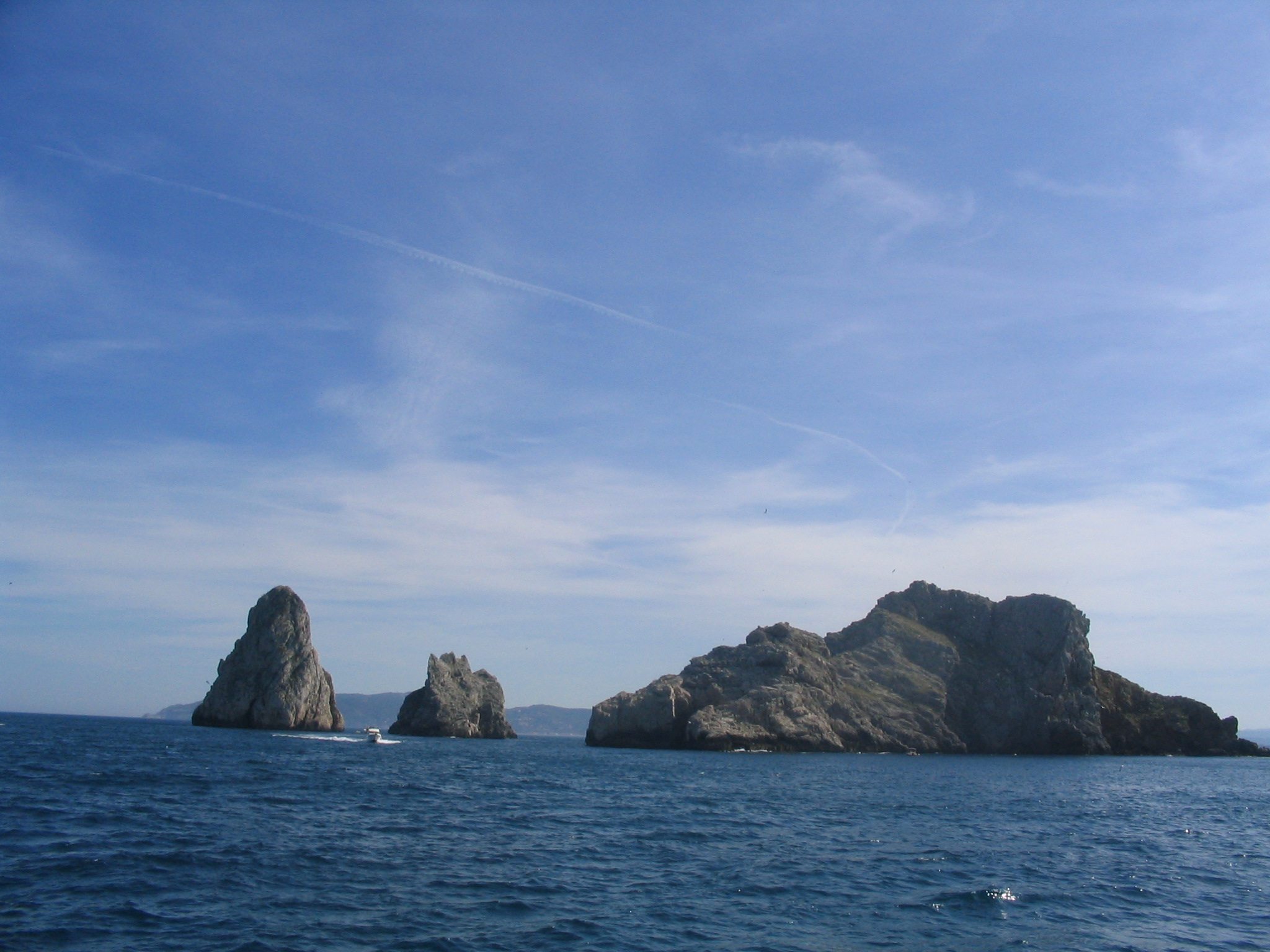
Carall Bernat, Tascons Grossos and Meda Petita.

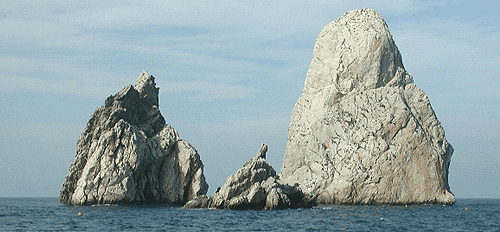
The Tascons Grossos, Tascons Petits and Carall Bernat.

== History ==
In the 15th century the Equestrian Order of the Holy Sepulchre of Jerusalem built a fortress on Meda Gran. They eventually left and pirate attacks in the 16th century damaged the fortress. The fortress became a prison during the 18th century and at the time of the Napoleonic Wars was again fortified.

On 29 August 1811 General Joaquín Ibáñez Cuevas y de Valonga, Baron de Eroles, at the behest of Luis Roberto de Lacy and with the assistance of HMS Cambrian, a Colonel Green, and British troops, landed, captured, and destroyed the fort the French had built on Meda Gran. Green then ordered the fort abandoned. Several weeks later, on 11 September, de Lacy landed on the island. He rebuilt, garrisoned and fortified the fort, and symbolically renamed the islands the Isles of the Restoration. The last military garrison left in 1890.

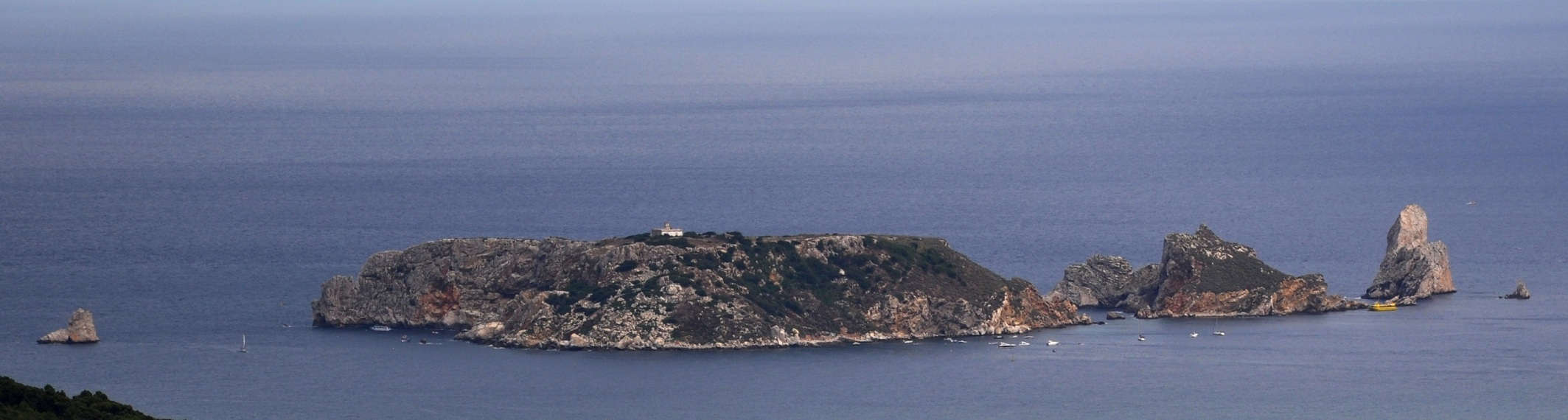
The Medes Islands seen from the Montgrí Massif. This image has annotations with names and heights of the islands, click here.

== Ecology ==
The Catalan Autonomous Government declared the islands a protected area in 1983. They are now becoming an important marine reserve in the Western Mediterranean.

Despite the ravages caused by industrial pollution and mass-tourism in the Mediterranean coast of the Iberian Peninsula, there is still a significant amount of marine biodiversity in the waters off the islands, such as large submarine meadows of Posidonia oceanica, and underwater caves where groupers breed.

== Diving ==
The Medes Islands are a popular scuba-diving destination in the western Mediterranean. The archipelago is the submerged continuation of the Montgrí massif, producing a karst topography of tunnels, caverns, vertical walls and boulder slopes; well-known dive sites include the tunnel through the island at La Vaca, the cave system at Dofí, and the gorgonian walls of Pedra de Déu.

Diving has been regulated since the islands were first protected in 1983, later reinforced by marine-reserve status and incorporation in 2010 into the Parc Natural del Montgrí, les Illes Medes i el Baix Ter. Every dive requires a permit arranged through an authorised dive centre, a daily diver quota is enforced, and a conservation briefing is mandatory before guided dives.

Decades of protection have made encounters with large dusky groupers (Epinephelus marginatus) a signature of diving at the islands; other commonly seen species include Mediterranean moray, common octopus and, seasonally, common eagle ray and ocean sunfish.

== See also ==
- Costa Brava
