= Hortsavinyà =

- Village
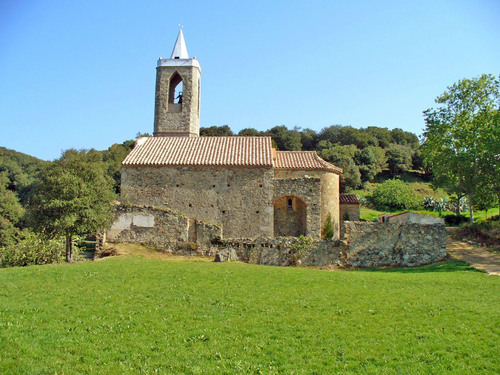
- Church of Santa Eulàlia (or Sant Llop) in Hortsavinyà

- Location within Province of Barcelona Location within Catalonia Location within Spain
- Coordinates: 41°40′04″N 2°37′43″E
- Country: Spain
- Autonomous community: Catalonia
- Province: Barcelona
- Comarca: Maresme
- Municipality: Tordera
- Elevation: 490 m (1,610 ft)

Hortsavinyà is a village within the municipality of Tordera in the comarca of Maresme, province of Barcelona, Catalonia, Spain.

The GR 92 long-distance footpath, which roughly follows the length of the Mediterranean coast of Spain, has a staging point at Hortsavinyà. Stage 13 links northwards to Tordera, a distance of 12.8 kilometres (8.0 mi), whilst stage 14 links southwards to Vallgorguina, a distance of 17.4 kilometres (10.8 mi).
