= Amposta =

- Municipality
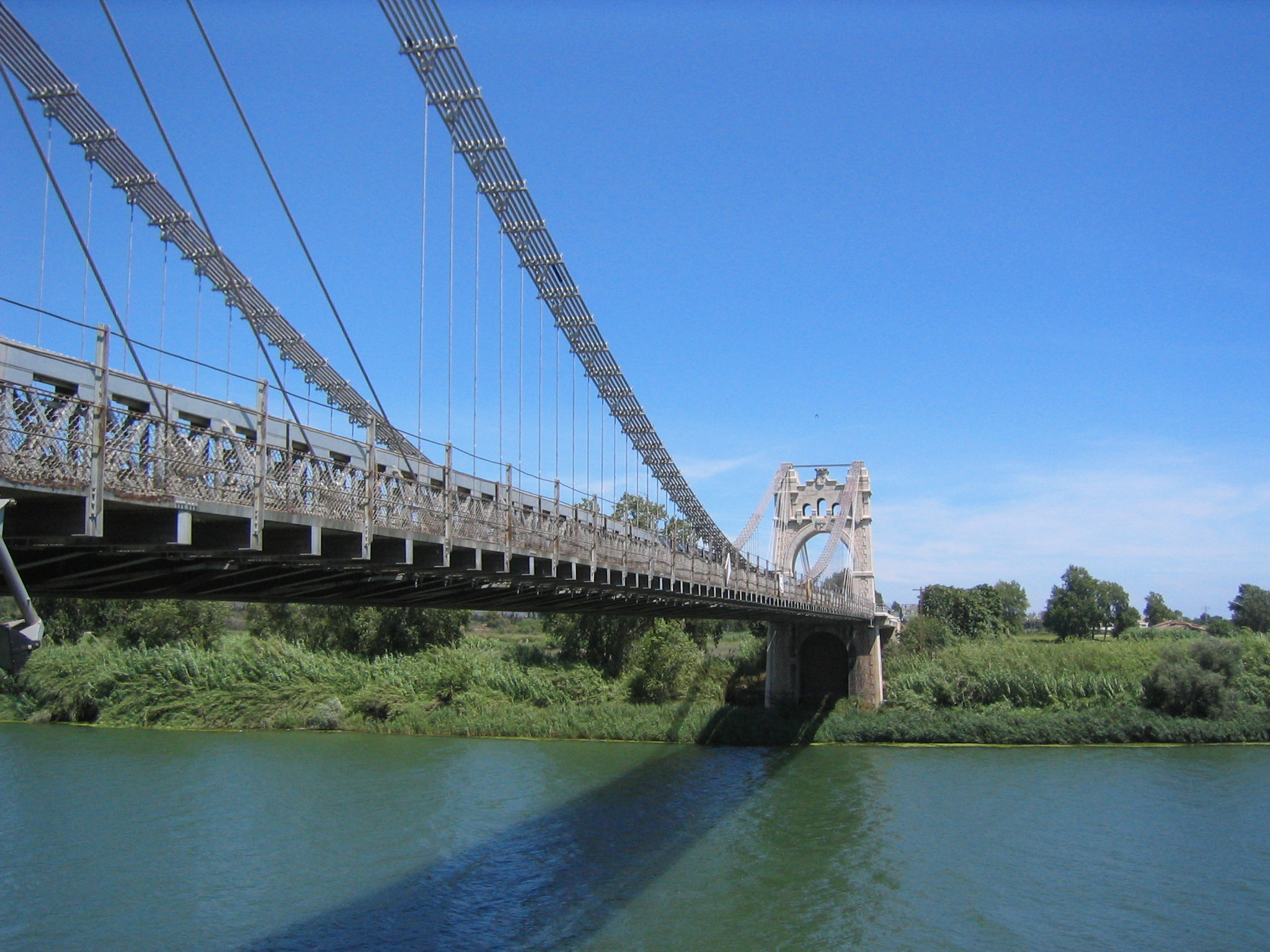

- Flag Coat of arms

- Location in Catalonia
- Coordinates: 40°42′38″N 0°34′51″E
- Country: Spain
- Autonomous community: Catalonia
- Province: Tarragona
- Comarca: Montsià

Government
  - mayor: Adam Tomàs Roiget (2015)

Area
  - Total: 138.3 km^{2} (53.4 sq mi)
- Elevation: 8 m (26 ft)

Population (2025-01-01)
  - Total: 23,080
  - Density: 166.9/km^{2} (432.2/sq mi)
- Demonyms: Ampostí, -ina
- Time zone: UTC+1 (CET)
  - Summer (DST): UTC+2 (CEST)
- Climate: Csa
- Website: www.amposta.cat

Amposta (Catalan pronunciation: [əmˈpɔstə/amˈpɔsta]) is the capital of the comarca of Montsià, in the province of Tarragona, Catalonia, Spain, 190 km south of Barcelona on the Mediterranean Coast. It is located at 8 metres above sea level, on the Ebre river, not far from its mouth. It has a population of 23,080 (register office, 2025).

The GR 92 long distance footpath, which roughly follows the length of the Mediterranean coast of Spain, has a staging point at Amposta. Stage 30 links northwards to L'Ampolla, a distance of 16.3 kilometres (10.1 mi), whilst stage 31 links southwards to the Pont de l'Olivar, a distance of 25.4 kilometres (15.8 mi).
