= Coll de Can Bordoi =

Mountain pass in Barcelona, Catalonia, Spain

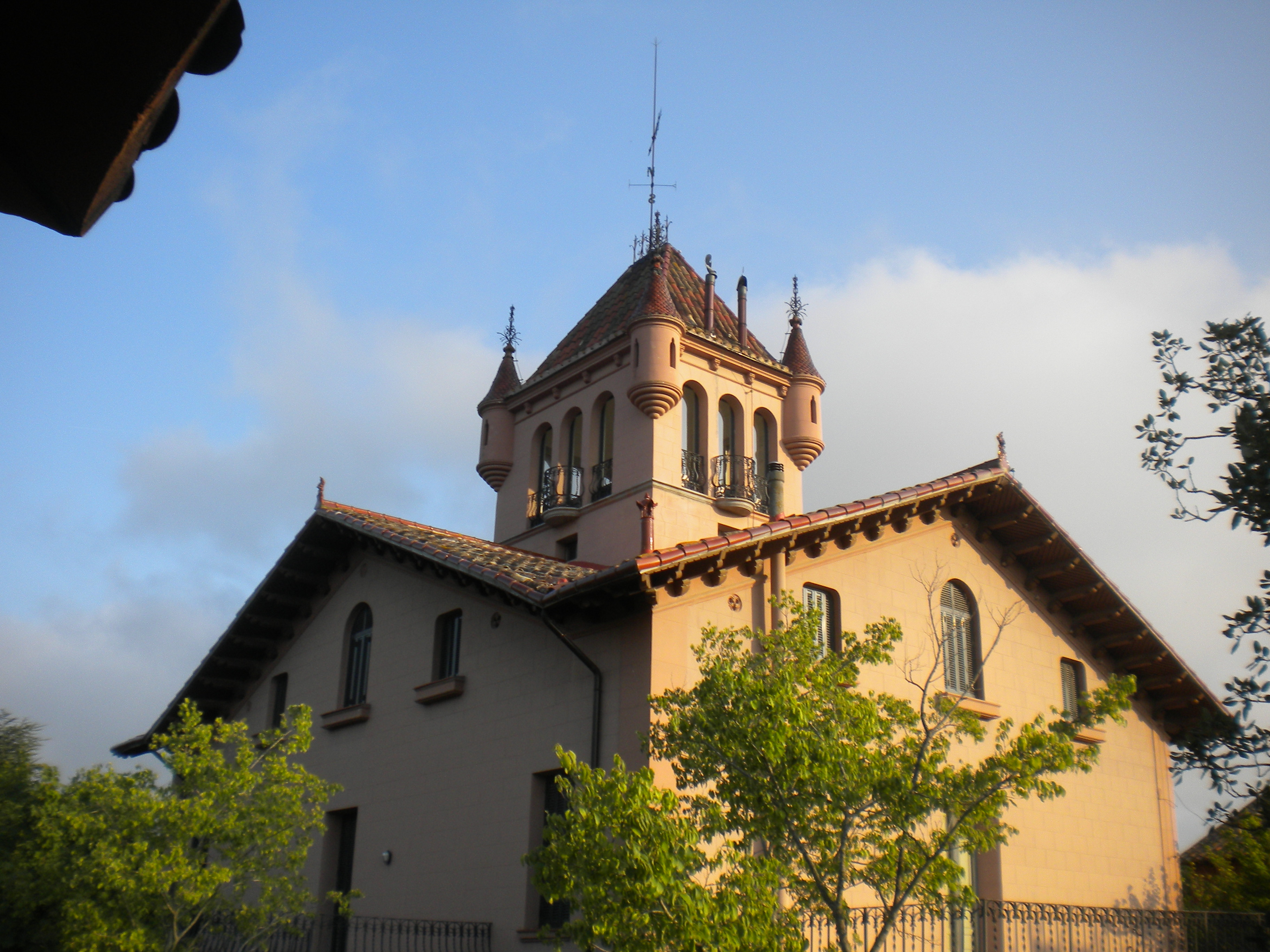
- The Can Bordoi farmhouse

- Location within Spain
- Elevation: 318.1 metres (1,044 ft)

Third Approach
- Location: Catalonia, Spain
- Range: Catalan Coastal Range
- Coordinates: 41°37′27″N 2°24′14″E

The Coll de Can Bordoi is a mountain pass on the B-510 road across the Catalan Coastal Range from Dosrius to Llinars del Vallès. The pass lies in the municipality of Llinars del Vallès, comarca of Vallès Oriental, province of Barcelona, Catalonia, Spain.

The pass reaches a height of 318.1 metres (1,044 ft) above sea level and is in the Parc del Montnegre i el Corredor. The farmhouse of Can Bordoi is situated 100 metres (330 ft) to the west of the pass and is included in the Inventory of the Architectural Heritage of Catalonia.

The GR 92 long distance footpath, which roughly follows the length of the Mediterranean coast of Spain, has a staging point on the pass. Stage 15 links northwards to Vallgorguina, a distance of 14.3 kilometres (8.9 mi), whilst stage 16 links southwards to Coll de la Font de Cera, a distance of 23.0 kilometres (14.3 mi).
