= Vallgorguina =

- Municipality
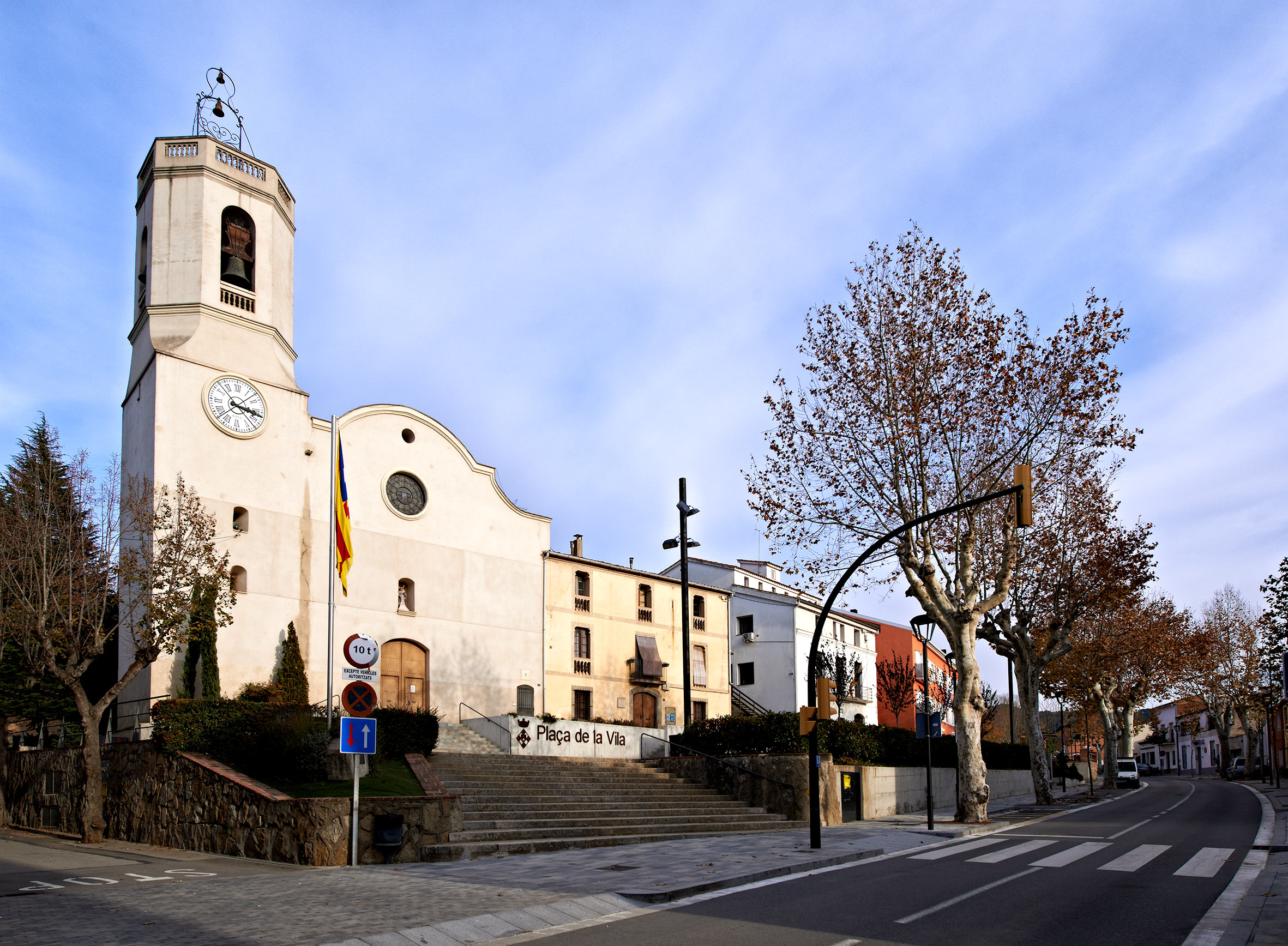
- Parish church

- Coat of arms

- Location in Catalonia Vallgorguina (Spain)
- Coordinates: 41°38′55″N 2°30′39″E
- Country: Spain
- Community: Catalonia
- Province: Barcelona
- Comarca: Vallès Oriental

Government
  - Mayor: Joan Mora Alsina (2015)

Area
  - Total: 22.1 km^{2} (8.5 sq mi)
- Elevation: 222 m (728 ft)

Population (2025-01-01)
  - Total: 3,261
  - Density: 148/km^{2} (382/sq mi)
- Demonym(s): Vallgorguinenc, vallgorguinenca
- Website: www.vallgorguina.cat

Vallgorguina (Catalan pronunciation: [ˌbaʎɣuɾˈɣinə]) is a municipality in the comarca of Vallès Oriental in Catalonia, Spain. It is situated in the hollow between the ranges of el Corredor and Montnegre. It is linked to Sant Celoni and to Arenys de Munt by a local road.

The GR 92 long distance footpath, which roughly follows the length of the Mediterranean coast of Spain, has a staging point at Vallgorguina. Stage 14 links northwards to Hortsavinyà, a distance of 17.4 kilometres (10.8 mi), whilst stage 15 links southwards to Coll de Can Bordoi, a distance of 14.3 kilometres (8.9 mi).

== Demography ==
1900	1930	1950	1970	1986	2008
708	609	603	429	647	2,404
