= L'Estartit =

- Municipality
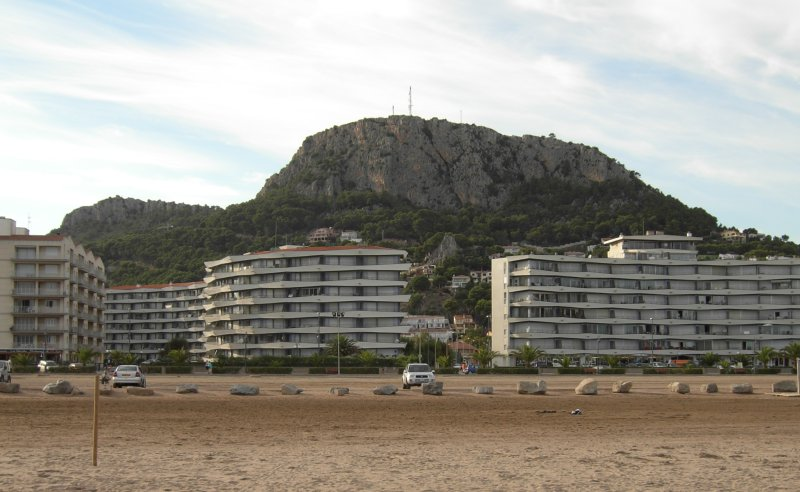
- Roca Maura, L'Estartit

- Coat of arms

- Location in the Province of Girona Location in Catalonia Location in Spain
- Coordinates: 42°3′10″N 3°11′30″E
- Country: Spain
- Autonomous community: Catalonia
- Province: Girona
- Comarca: Baix Empordà
- Municipality: Torroella de Montgrí

Population (2009)
  - Total: 3,571
- Demonym(s): Catalan: estartidenc, estartidenca
- Time zone: UTC+1 (CET)
  - Summer (DST): UTC+2 (CEST)
- Postal code: 17258

L'Estartit (Catalan pronunciation: [lestaɾˈtit]; Spanish: Estartit) is a small town and seaside resort on the Costa Brava, part of the municipality of Torroella de Montgrí in the Baix Empordà county, Girona province, autonomous community of Catalonia, Spain. The town is situated between the foothills of the Montgrí Massif and the Mediterranean Sea.

== Geography ==
L'Estartit stretches North-South from Cala Montgó, at the southern tip of the Bay of Roses (Badía de Roses) to the Ter River estuary in the Bay of Pals (Badía de Pals). East-West it extends three kilometers inland from the shoreline and includes the hills of Rocamaura and Torre Moratxa, and to the north of these the old farmhouse of Torre Ponça. The Montgrí Massif (Massís del Montgrí) plunges into the sea forming about 9 kilometers of high, rocky, and cut coast, in which we find several coves, including Cala Calella, Golfet del Falaguer, Cala Pedrosa and Cala Ferriola, as well as different caves, including the tunnel Roca Foradada and the Tres Coves, closest to Cala Montgó. The Medes Islands are an elevation within the sea of the Montgrí Massif range. From the GI-645 road, you can also see the lower peaks called Tossal Gros, Tossal Mitjà, Tossal Petit, and Puig de la Reina.

To the east of Torre Ponça opens the Alt de la Pedrosa, a plateau where the abandoned LORAN base is located, a former military base of the United States Coast Guard, which has now been demolished.

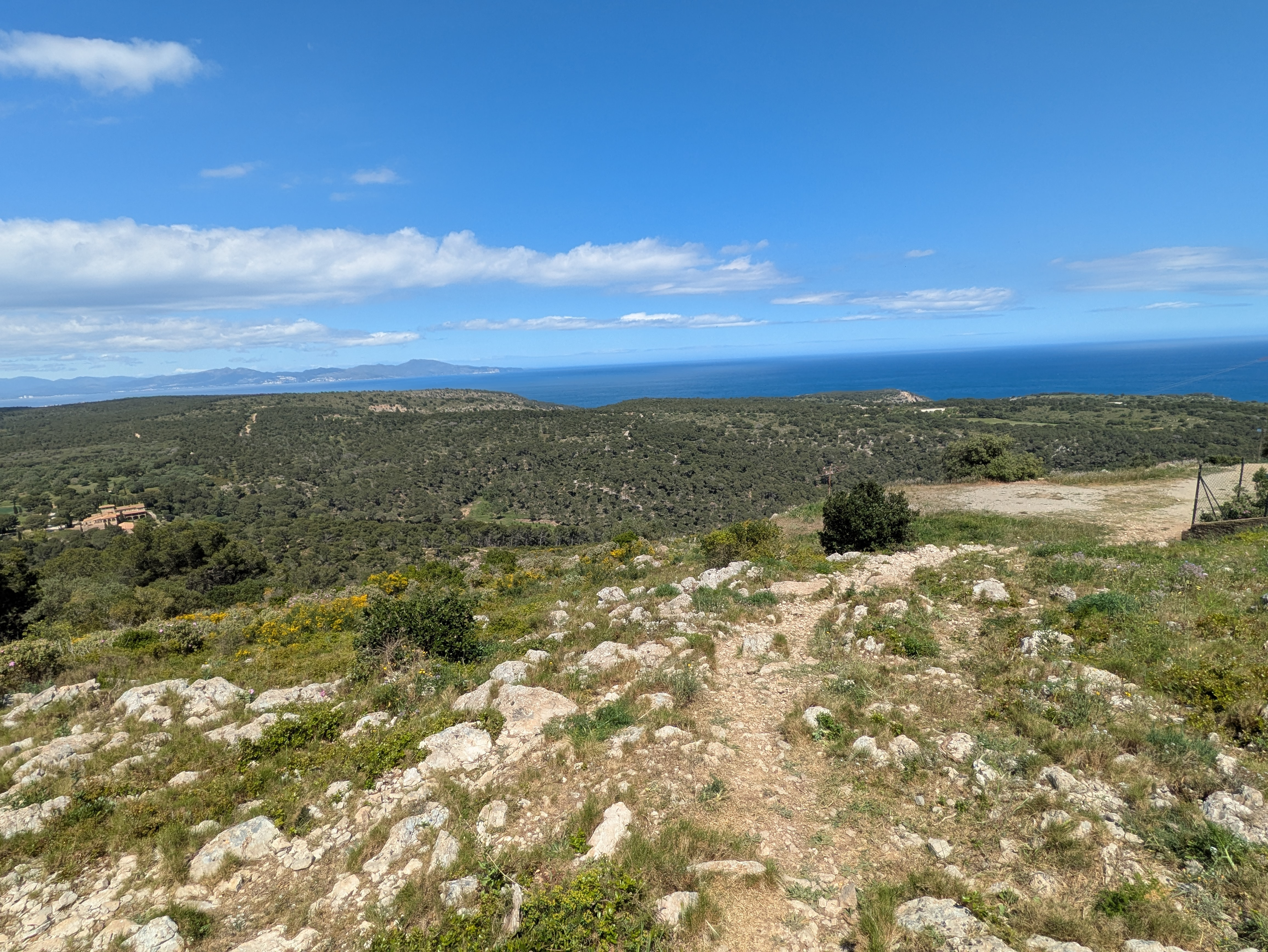
The Alt de la Pedrosa limestone plateau. Torre Ponça is the building on the left. The plateau lies at an altitude of about 150 metres above sea level, and consists of Mesozoic limestone.

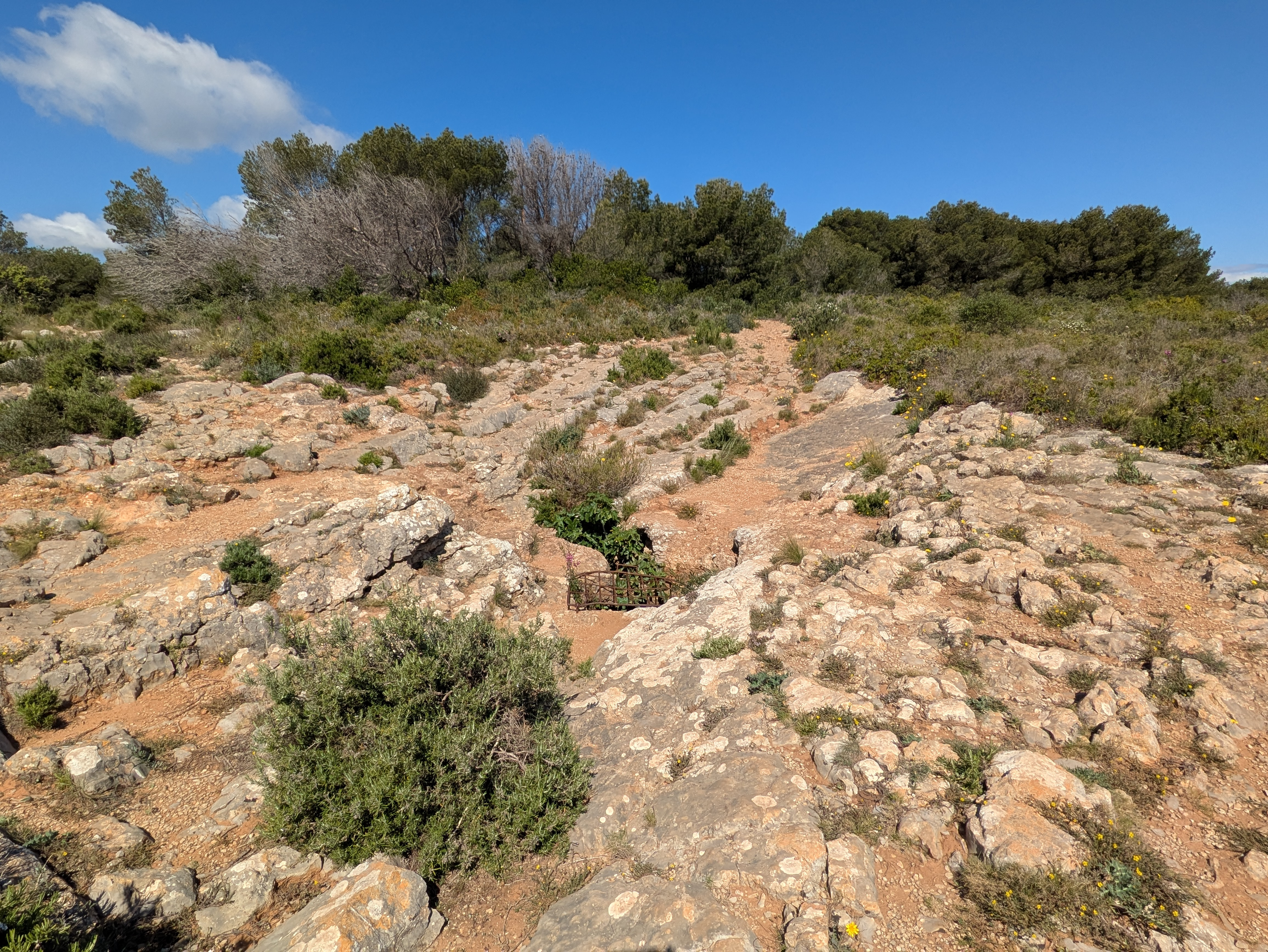
The Pou de la Calella sinkhole on Alt de la Pedrosa. This aven has a depth of at least 50 metres, and is the deepest sinkhole in this area.

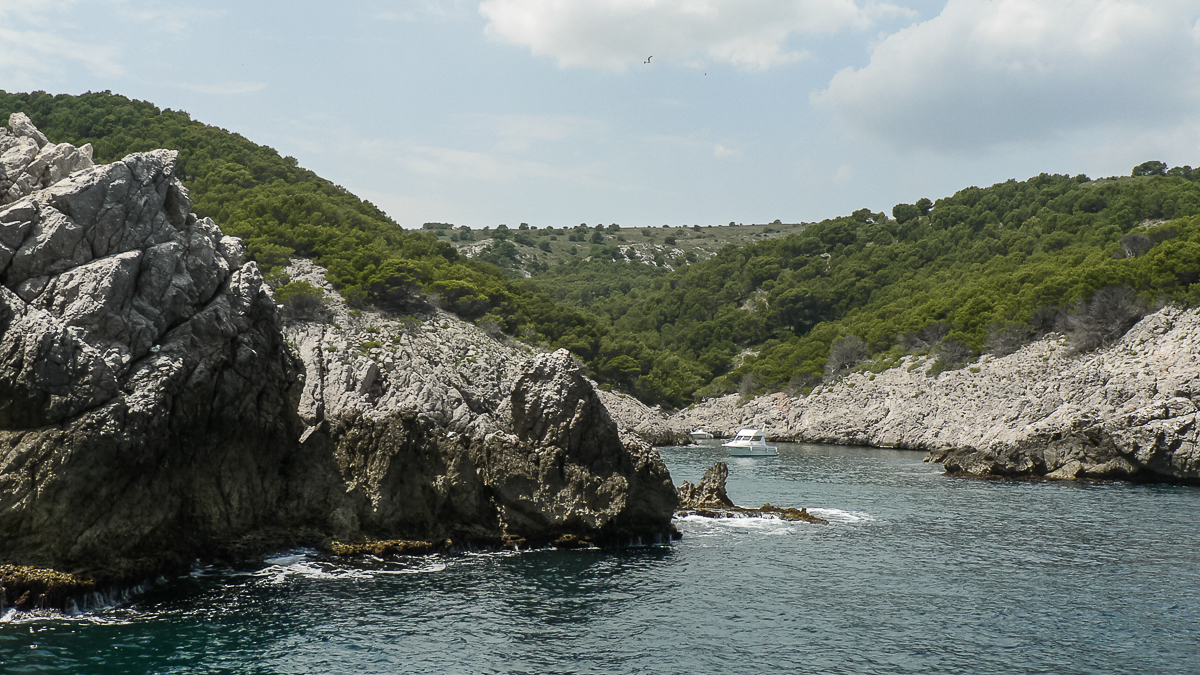
Cala Pedrosa, a cove at the foot of Alt de la Pedrosa plateau.

== Economy ==
Initially a fishing village, the advent of tourism in the Costa Brava from the 1960s onwards brought a large influx of visitors to the town during the summer months. The community grew exponentially for the next two decades, initially with houses and villas built up the hills that surround the harbor, and later with hotels, apartment blocks, and campsites extending along the beach and the flood plain of the Ter estuary.

The tourist industry also led to a large immigrant population (mostly from other parts of Spain), needed to serve the ever-growing number of visitors. Tourists visiting L'Estartit originate mainly from France, the United Kingdom, Ireland, Germany and the Netherlands, with significant numbers coming from Barcelona for the weekend too, whilst the majority of the labor force hails from the south of Spain, especially Andalusia and Extremadura.

Like many other tourist resorts around the world, massification and uncontrolled growth led the town to lose the charm that had made it popular in the first place. Tourism has been dwindling since the 1990s. However, the underwater beauty of the Illes Medes, the large and well-equipped sports marina, and the abundance of nearby golf courses keep divers, sailors, and golfers coming back year after year and has seen a revival in the area's fortunes. The important development of nearby campsites or even within the center of Estartit is also noteworthy, so the type of tourism that hosts Estartit has a more familiar profile than in other tourist spots. In addition, the town is considered one of the best destinations in the world for scuba diving, which makes the tourist season longer than in other towns that only offer traditional sun and beach tourism and do not have this additional tourist asset. Despite this population shift to tourist activities, agricultural and livestock activities are still maintained, and the town has preserved the remaining old fishing houses and cobbled streets from before the 60s.

The port of the Club Nàutic Estartit has 687 moorings for boats from 4 m to 25 m in length with water and electricity connection and bathrooms with shower. The facilities of the Club Nàutic Estartit occupy an area of 15,945 m^{2} with parking for vehicles, crane, ramp, service dock, waste collection point, social club, and WIFI service.

== History ==
The first news of L'Estartit appeared in the 17th century when the activity of Turkish and Berber piracy on the Catalan coasts had already decreased and until the middle of the twentieth century, its development was linked to maritime activity. Its port allowed the departure of the town's products by sea, such as wheat, rice, wine, and spirits, to large markets such as Barcelona. More recently, a pro-independence movement has emerged to make Estartit an independent municipality, but after long administrative and judicial processes they have not prospered. However, pro-independence sentiment is still alive in the majority of the population.

== Gallery ==
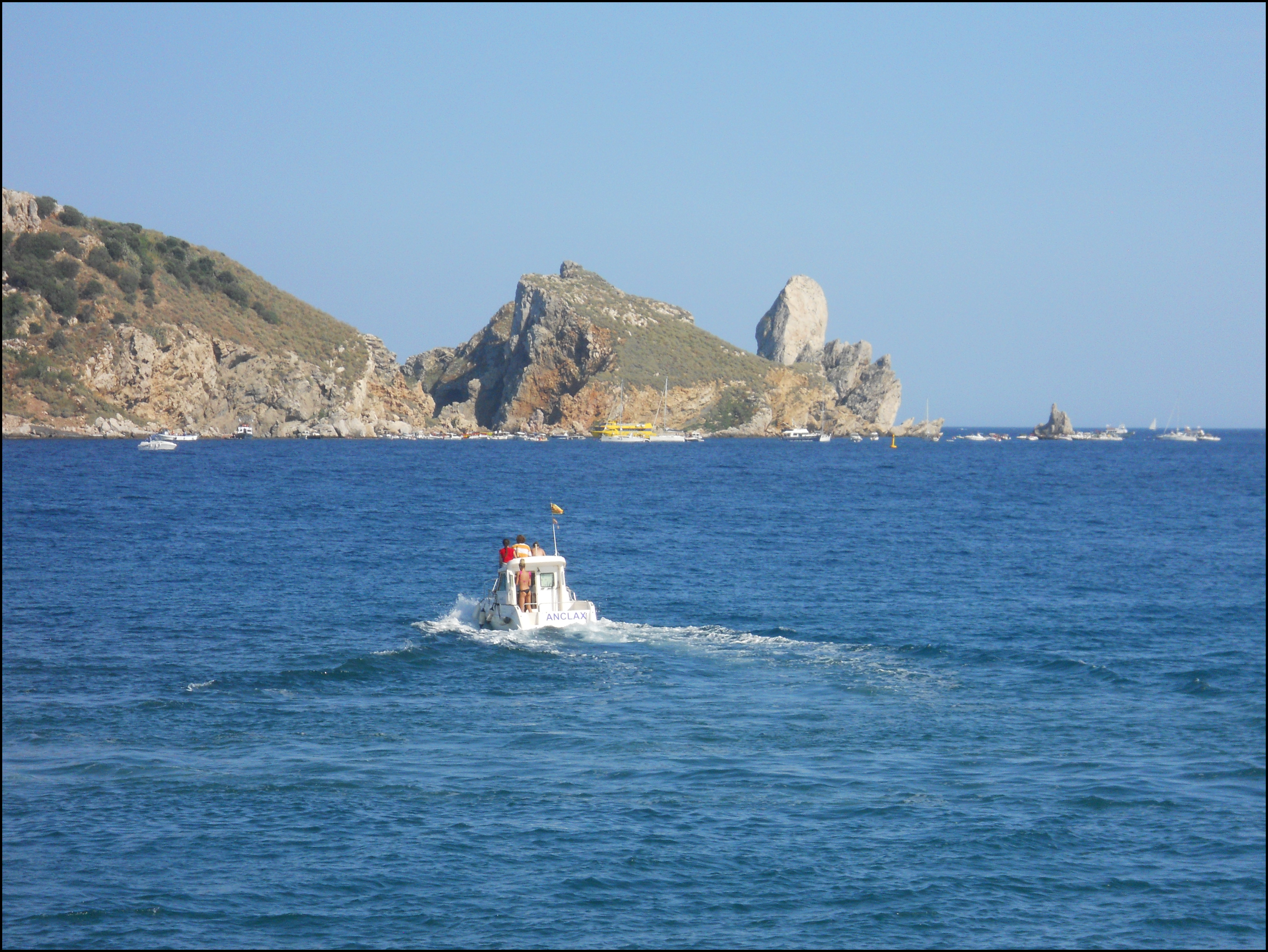
View of the Medes Islands from L'Estartit

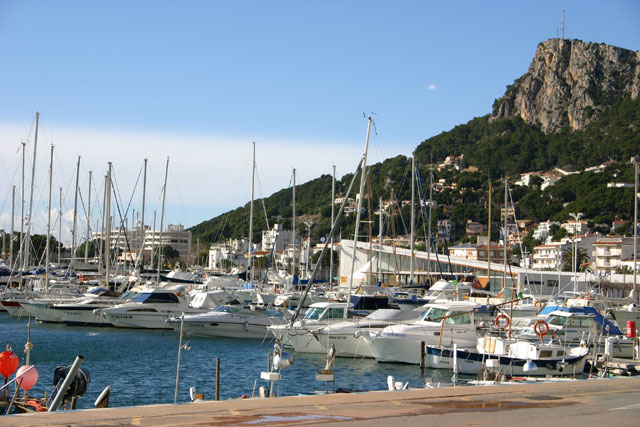
The L'Estartit port, and Roca Maura

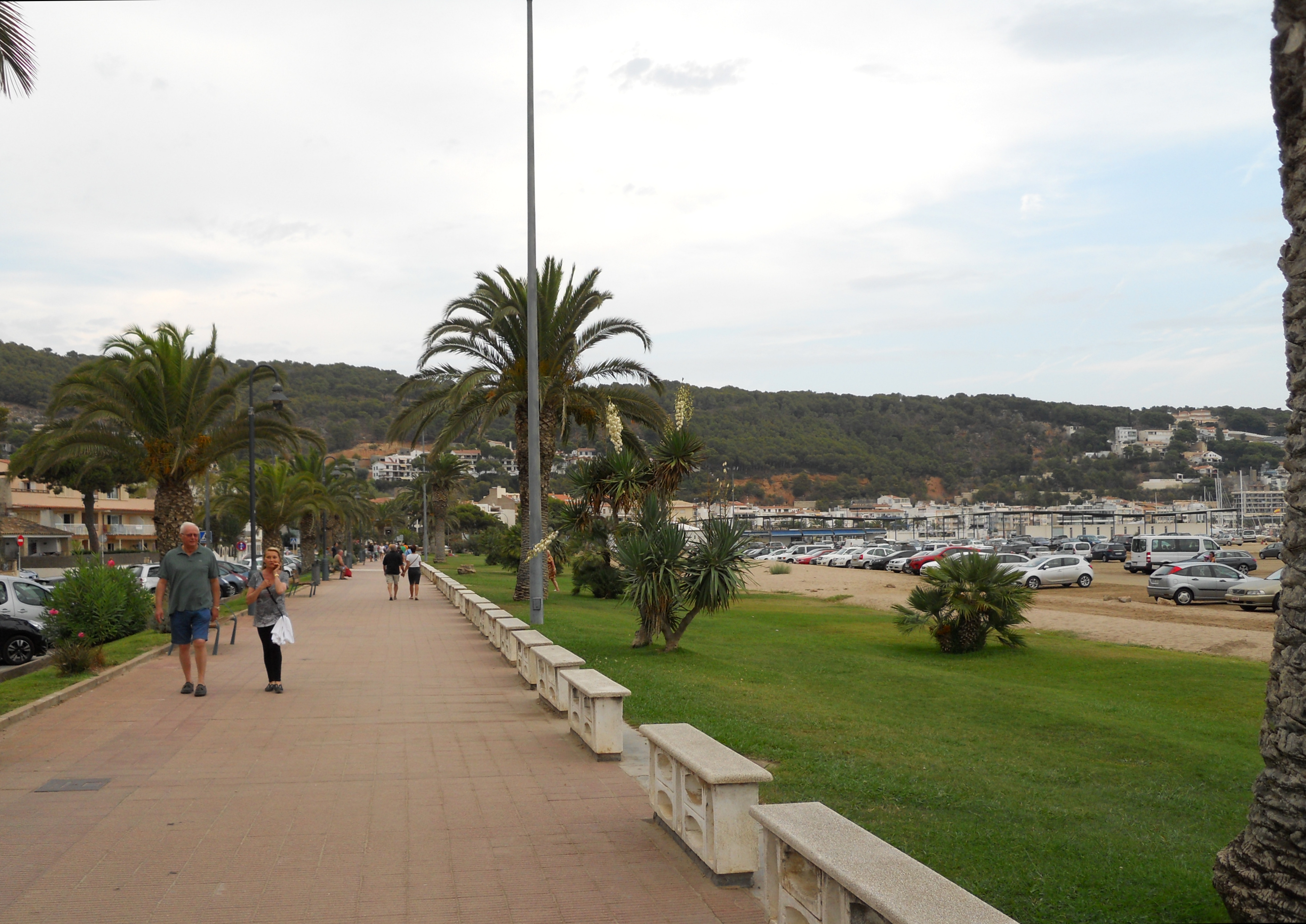
A walk to the port

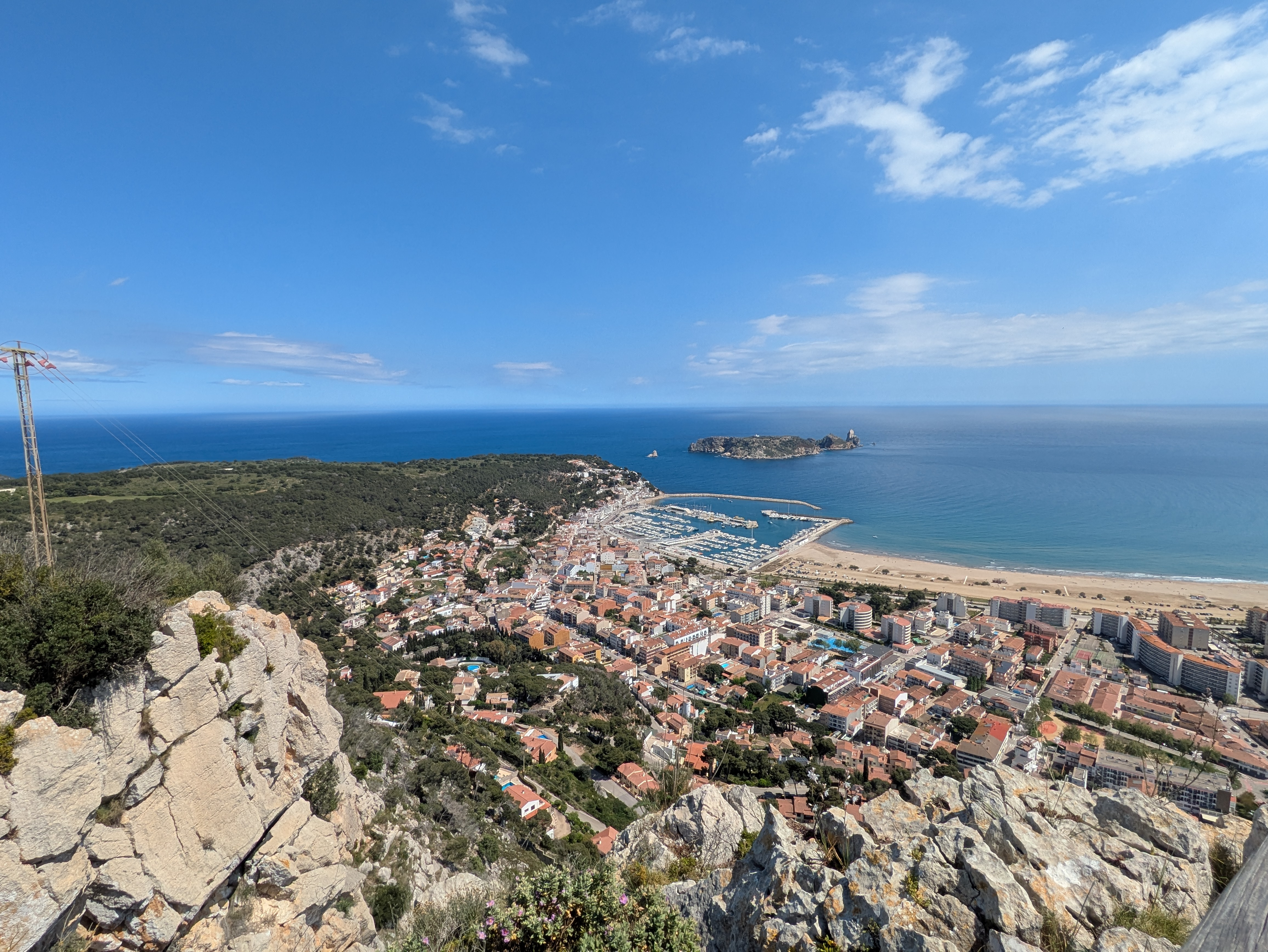
View from Roca Maura (altitude 255 metres) over L'Estartit
