= Coll de la Font de Cera =

Mountain pass in Barcelona, Catalonia, Spain

- Location within Spain
- Elevation: 274.5 metres (901 ft)

Third Approach
- Location: Catalonia, Spain
- Range: Catalan Coastal Range
- Coordinates: 41°30′50″N 2°17′39″E

The Coll de la Font de Cera is a mountain pass on the BP-5002 road across the Catalan Coastal Range from El Masnou to Granollers. The pass lies between the municipality of Alella, in the comarca of Maresme, and the municipality of Vallromanes, in the comarca of Vallès Oriental. Both municipalities are in the province of Barcelona, Catalonia, Spain.

The pass reaches a height of 274.5 metres (901 ft) above sea level and is in the Parc de la Serralada Litoral.

The GR 92 long-distance footpath, which roughly follows the length of the Mediterranean coast of Spain, has a staging point on the pass. Stage 16 links northwards to Coll de Can Bordoi, a distance of 23.0 kilometres (14.3 mi), whilst stage 17 links southwards to Montcada i Reixac, a distance of 16.9 kilometres (10.5 mi).
