= Tordera =

- Municipality
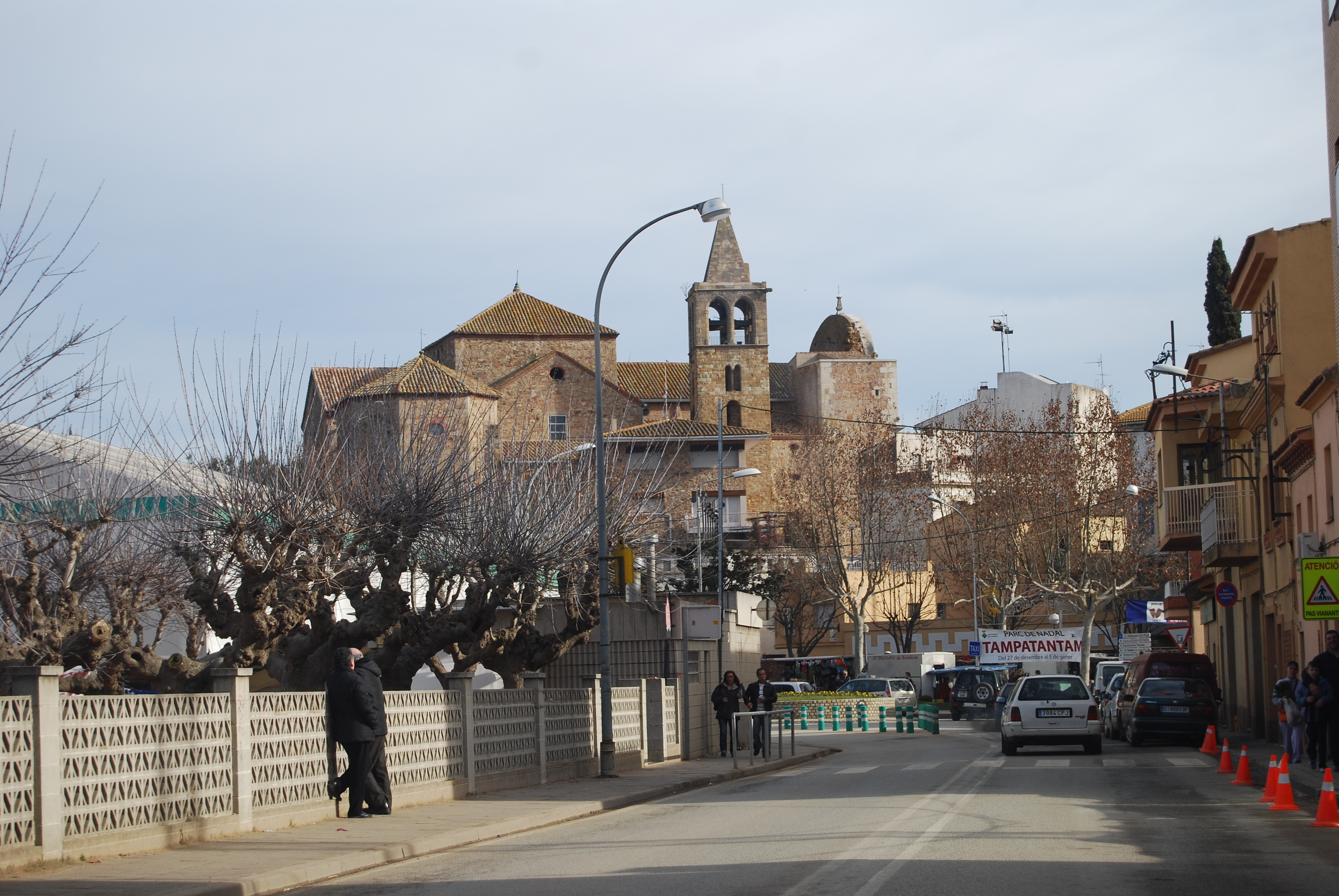

- Coat of arms

- Location in Catalonia Tordera (Spain)
- Coordinates: 41°42′3″N 2°43′12″E
- Country: Spain
- Community: Catalonia
- Province: Barcelona
- Comarca: Maresme

Government
  - Mayor: Joan Carles García Cañizares (2015)

Area
  - Total: 84.1 km^{2} (32.5 sq mi)
- Elevation: 34 m (112 ft)

Population (2025-01-01)
  - Total: 19,039
  - Density: 226/km^{2} (586/sq mi)
- Demonym: Torderenc
- Postal code: 08490
- Website: tordera.cat

Tordera (Catalan pronunciation: [tuɾˈðeɾə]) is a city in the comarca of Maresme, province of Barcelona, Catalonia, Spain, situated 64 km from Barcelona and 36 km from Girona on the edge of the Montnegre natural park. Its population as of 2010 was 15,641.

The economy used to be based on agriculture, especially cork production, but has diversified into textile manufacturing and construction. The Tordera River flows through the town. The Romanesque church of Saint Stephen is situated in the town centre: part of the altar is original, but the rest of the building was renovated in the 16th and 18th centuries.

The GR 92 long distance footpath, which roughly follows the length of the Mediterranean coast of Spain, has a staging point at Tordera. Stage 12 links northwards to Lloret de Mar, a distance of 17.2 kilometres (10.7 mi), whilst stage 13 links southwards to Hortsavinyà, a distance of 12.8 kilometres (8.0 mi).
