= Torroella de Montgrí =

- Municipality
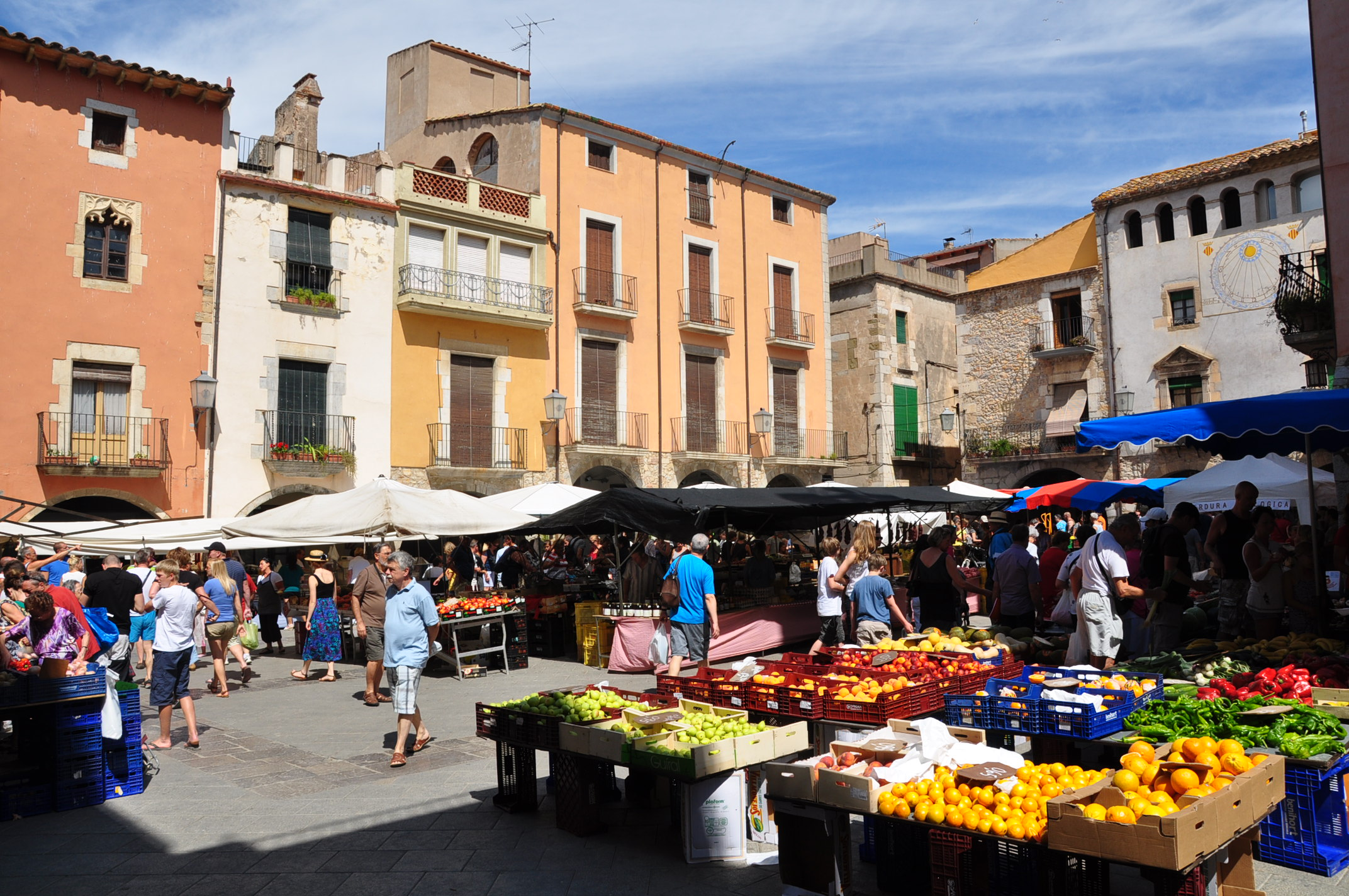
- Weekly market on the main square

- Flag Coat of arms

- Location in the Province of Girona Location in Catalonia Location in Spain
- Coordinates: 42°2′38″N 3°7′43″E
- Country: Spain
- Autonomous community: Catalonia
- Province: Girona
- Comarca: Baix Empordà
- Judicial district: La Bisbal d'Empordà

Government
  - Mayor: Josep Maria Rufí (Jordi Cordon Pulido (2015))

Area
  - Total: 65.9 km^{2} (25.4 sq mi)
- Elevation: 31 m (102 ft)

Population (2025-01-01)
  - Total: 12,570
  - Density: 191/km^{2} (494/sq mi)
- Demonym: Montgrins
- Time zone: UTC+1 (CET)
  - Summer (DST): UTC+2 (CEST)
- Postal code: 17257
- Website: torroella-estartit.cat

Torroella de Montgrí (Catalan pronunciation: [turuˈeʎə ðə muŋˈɡɾi]) is a coastal municipality on the Costa Brava, and small town in Catalonia, Spain. The town lies on the north bank of the Ter river, a few kilometres before it flows into the Mediterranean. The beach resort of L'Estartit also is part of the municipality, as are the Medes Islands and a large part of the Montgrí Massif.

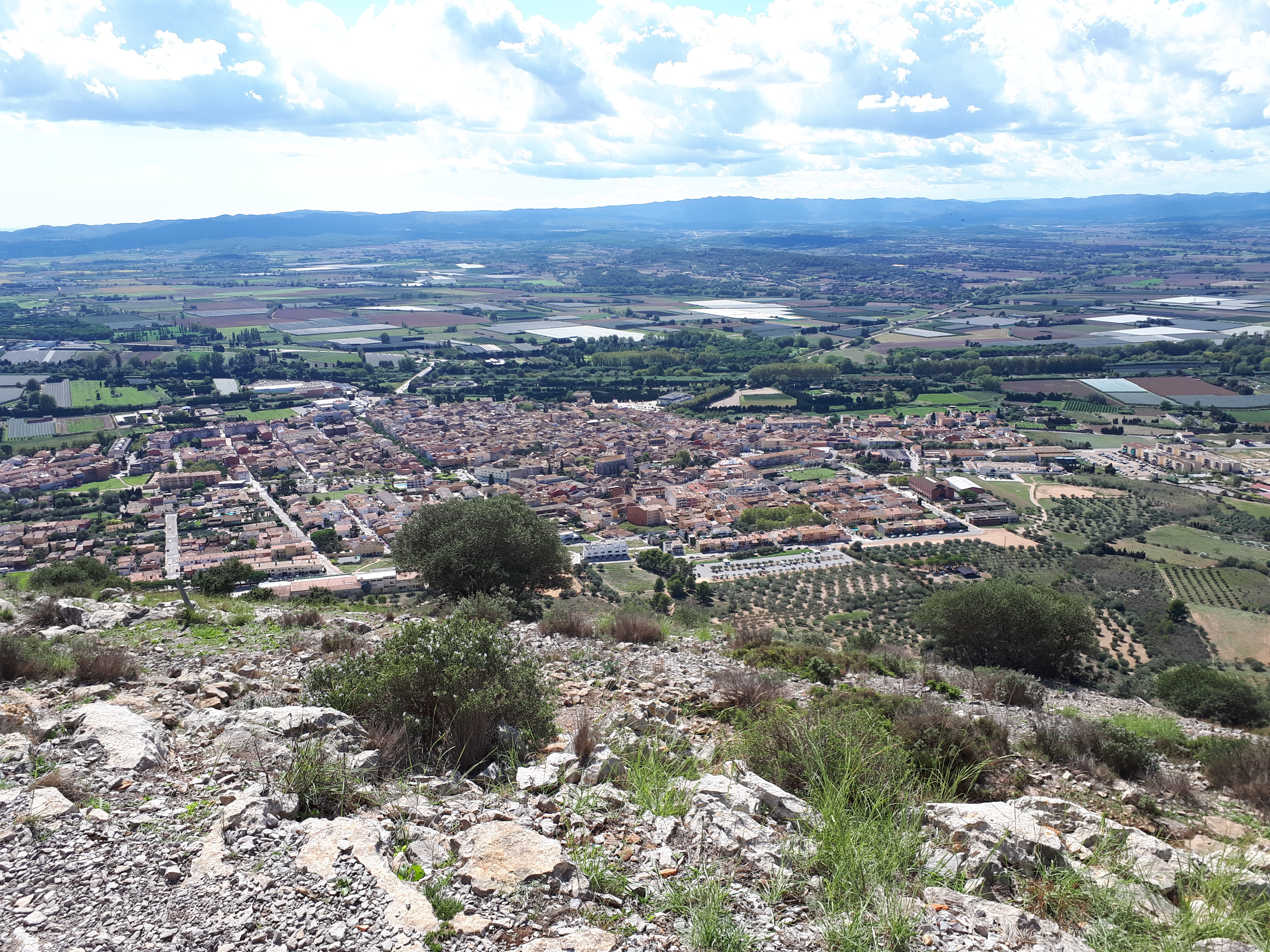
The town of Torroella de Montgrí, as seen from Montgrí Castle.

The town is 22 km (14 mi) east of Girona and 5 km (3.1 mi) west of the resort of L'Estartit. It lies on the junction of the C-31 and GI-641. The town was originally the Royal Port for the Kings of Aragon before the river started silting up and a new port was founded at l'Estartit. The town retains its medieval core and walls and hosts a market every Monday.

The town is towered over by the Montgrí Massif on its northern side. The Montgrí is a long mountain formation that looks like a sleeping bishop seen from afar. Its vegetation consists mostly of low Mediterranean scrub among rocks. The maximum height of the range is 308 m (1,010 ft) and it is topped by an ancient fortress in the middle, the Montgrí Castle.

The town is a staging point on the GR 92 long-distance footpath, which roughly follows the length of the Mediterranean coast of Spain. Stage 6, to the north, takes a largely inland route, starting with a climb to the Montgrí Castle and then crossing the Montgri Massif to reach the sea at L'Escala before the next staging point of Sant Martí d'Empúries, a distance of 20.0 kilometres (12.4 mi). Stage 7, to the south, takes an inland route, crossing the Ter river and continuing via Gualta, Fontanilles, Palau-sator and Pals to the next staging point at Begur, a distance of 21.3 kilometres (13.2 mi).

== Gallery ==
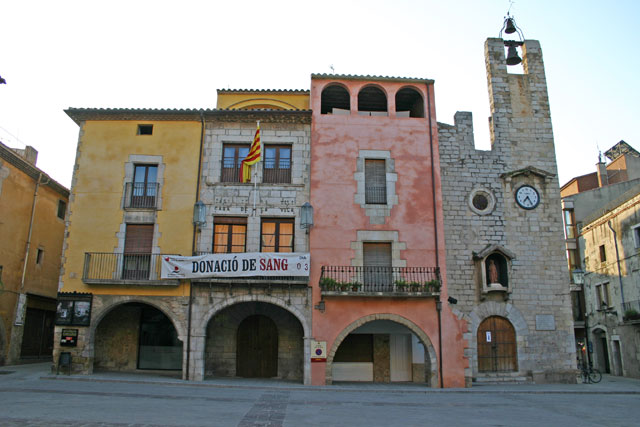
Plaça de la Vila

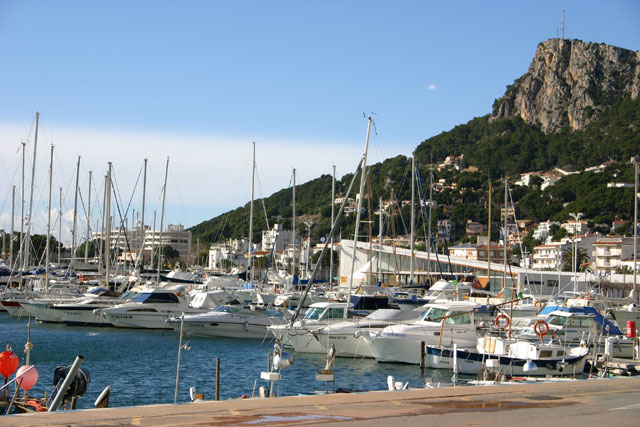
Estartit port

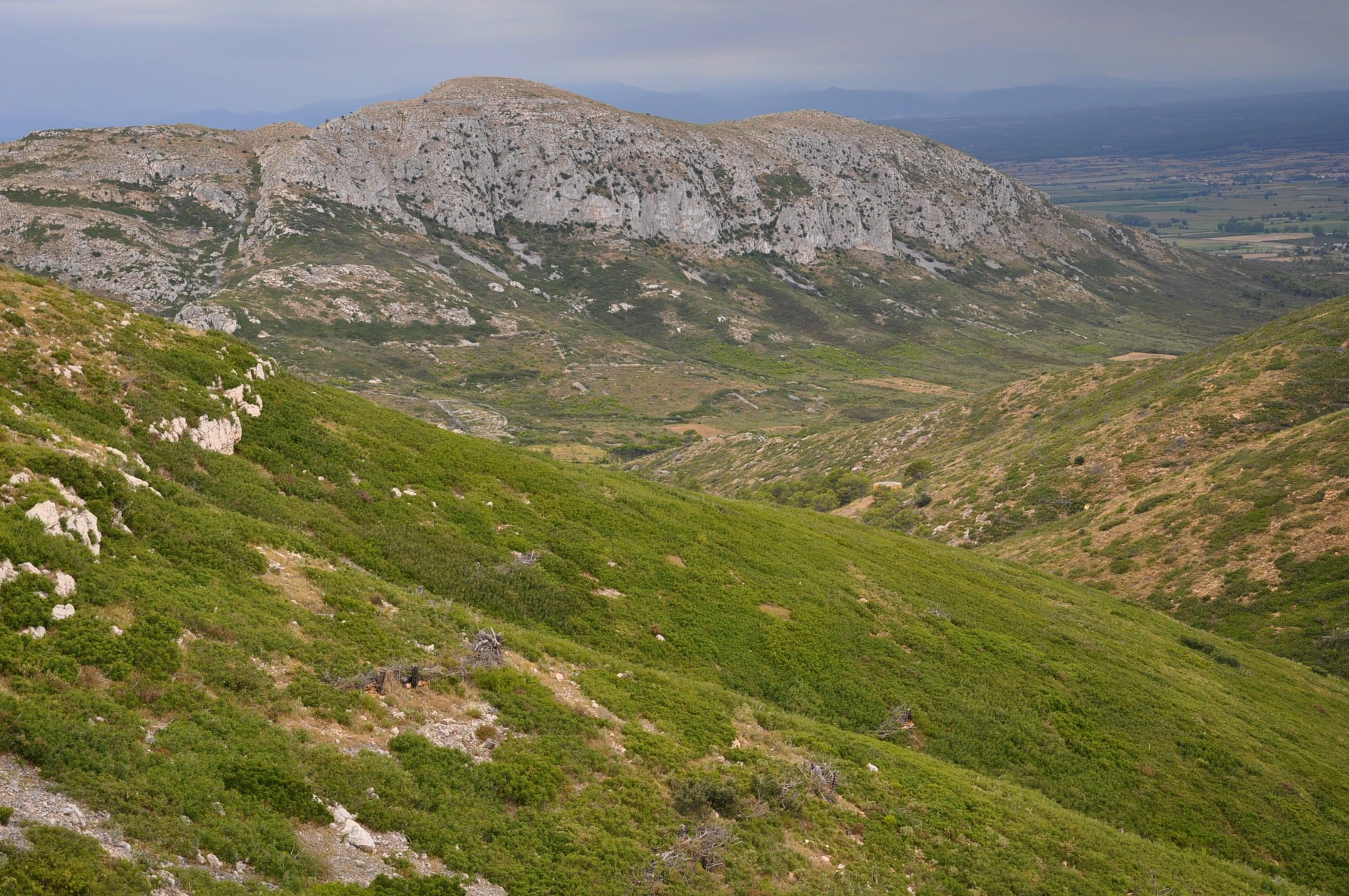
The Montgrí Massif

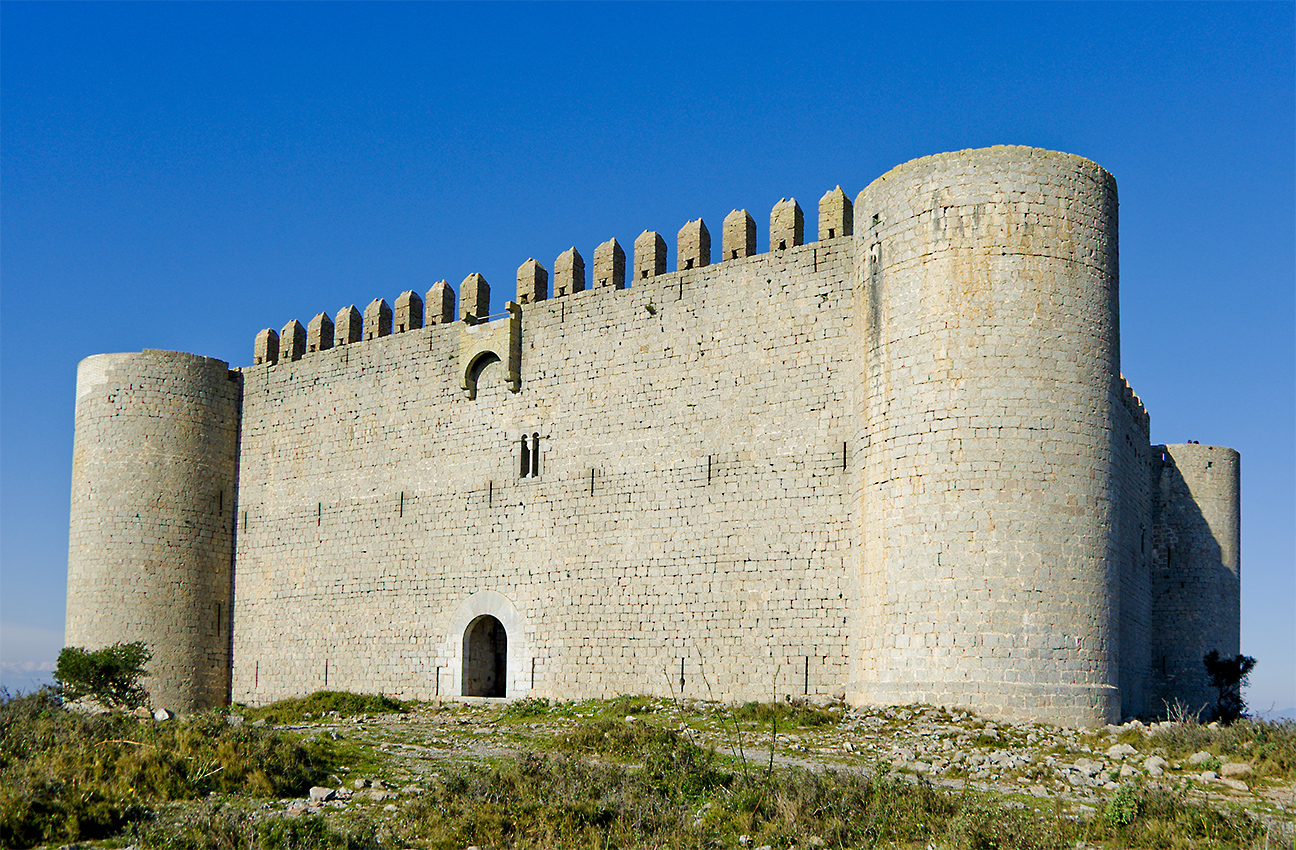
Castell de Montgrí

== Notable people ==
- Javier Sagrera (born 2004), racing driver
- Esther Sullastres (born 1993), professional footballer for Spain
- Dolors Bassa (born 1959), politician
