= Montgrí Castle =

Structure in Torroella de Montgrí, Spain

- Castell del Montgrí (in Catalan)
- Torroella de Montgrí, Catalonia, Spain
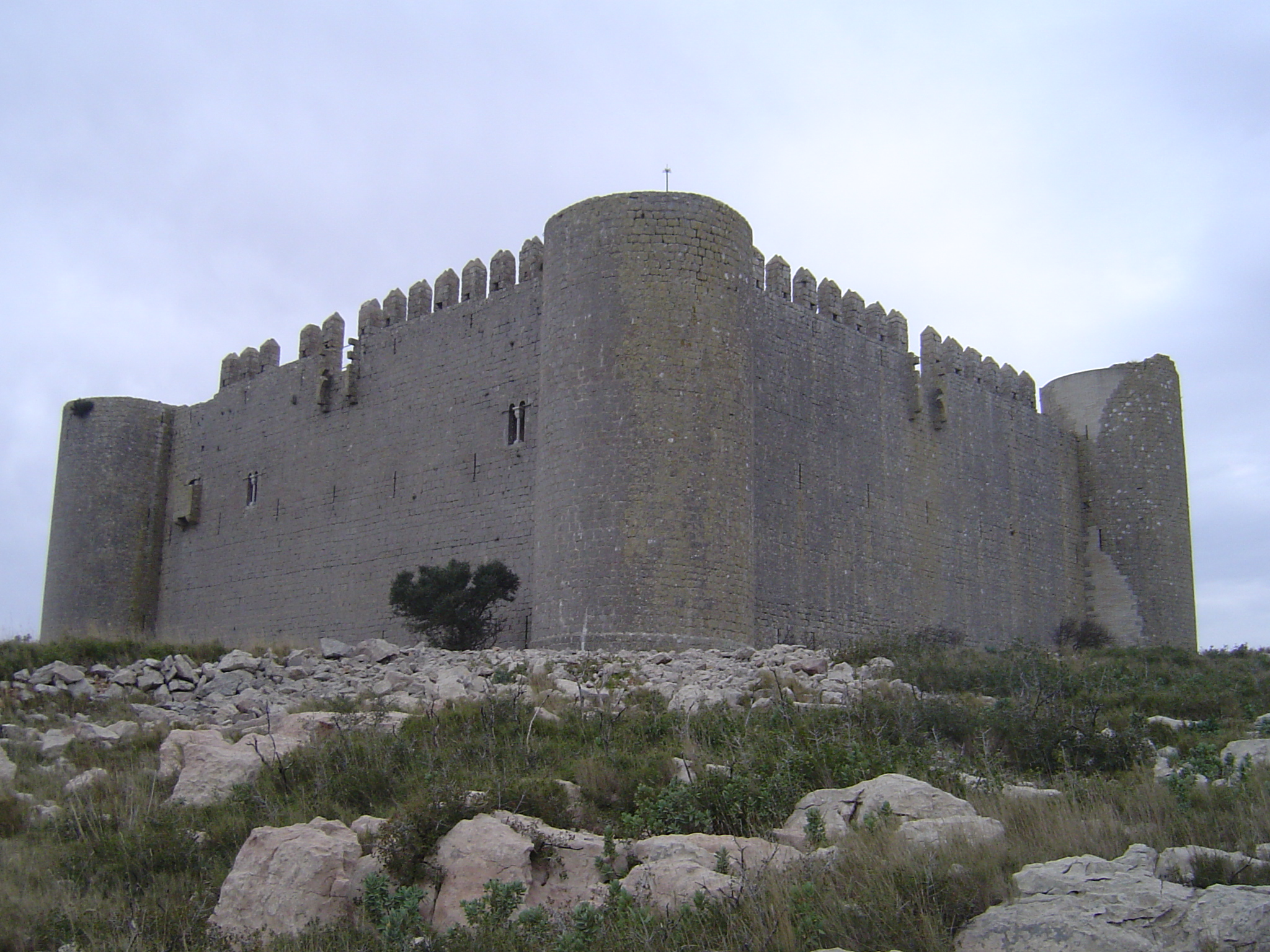
- Montgrí Castle.

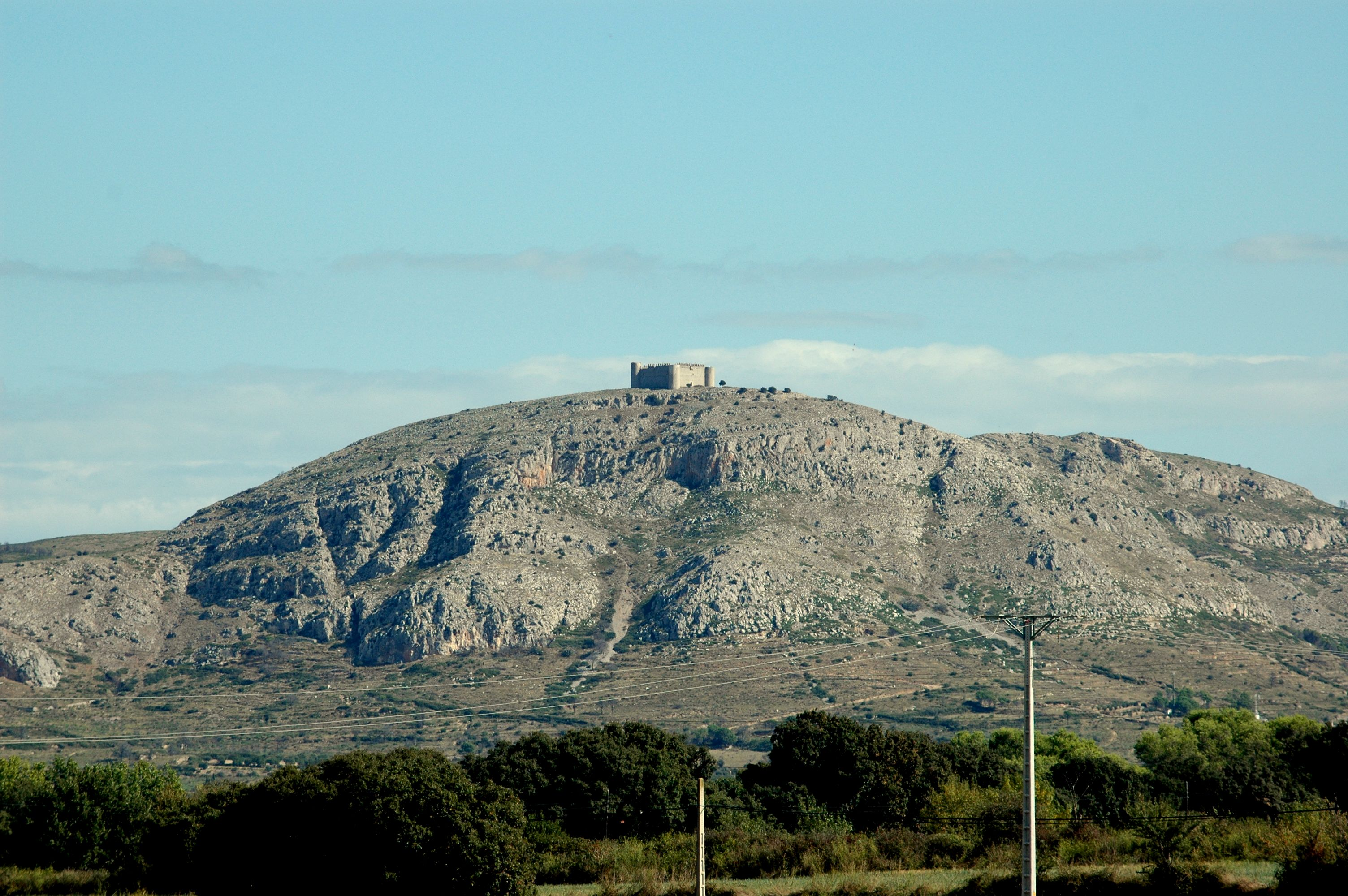
- Montgrí Castle at the top of the Montgrí Massif.

Site information
- Type: Castle
- Open to the public: yes

Location
- Coordinates: 42.0518°N 3.13134°E

Site history
- Built: 1294; 732 years ago to 1301; 725 years ago
- Built by: James II of Aragon
- In use: 1301; 725 years ago to 1472; 554 years ago

The Montgrí Castle (Catalan: Castell del Montgrí) is a historical edifice in Torroella de Montgrí, Catalonia, Spain, built between 1294 and 1301. Its reason to be was the existing conflict between the counts of Empúries - who ruled over most of the area around the town - and the counts of Barcelona, the most powerful of Catalonia at that time, who also had great power over the Mediterranean.

In order to control the moves of the counts of Empuriés, the court of Barcelona commanded Bernat de Llabià, the governor of the Royal town of Torroella de Montgrí, to supervise the building of a fortress on top of the Montgrí Massif. Work started in 1294 but the fortress was never completed as is obvious today. After those days, the fortress has lost its strategic value but has instead become a symbol of the region.

The GR 92 long distance footpath, which roughly follows the length of the Mediterranean coast of Spain, passes the castle on its stage between Sant Martí d'Empúries and Torroella de Montgrí.

== Structure ==
The fortress' style is one of the Middle Eastern fortresses that became popular in Europe after the Crusades. They featured a regular plan with cylindrical towers attached within the walls.

The only parts erected were the perimeter walls, forming a square of 31 m (102 ft)31m along each side, and the four round towers at its corners. The walls are 13 m (43 ft) high with battlements along the top.

The interior of the enclosure was laid out around a square, stone-paved central courtyard. Underneath this, there remains a large cistern for collecting rainwater.

Around the courtyard, four wings of auxiliary buildings were planned out but never built. However the interior surfaces of the wall retain certain elements (toothing stones and springings for arches and vaults) which enable us to visualize the structure that these buildings were to have.

Outside the castle, the former quarries can be seen, as well as the remains of a wall in the south face and a large cistern on the northern slope of the mountains.
