= San Juan De Los Terreros =

Village in Pulpí, Almería Province, Andalusia, Spain

Coordinates: 37°21′34″N 1°39′40″W

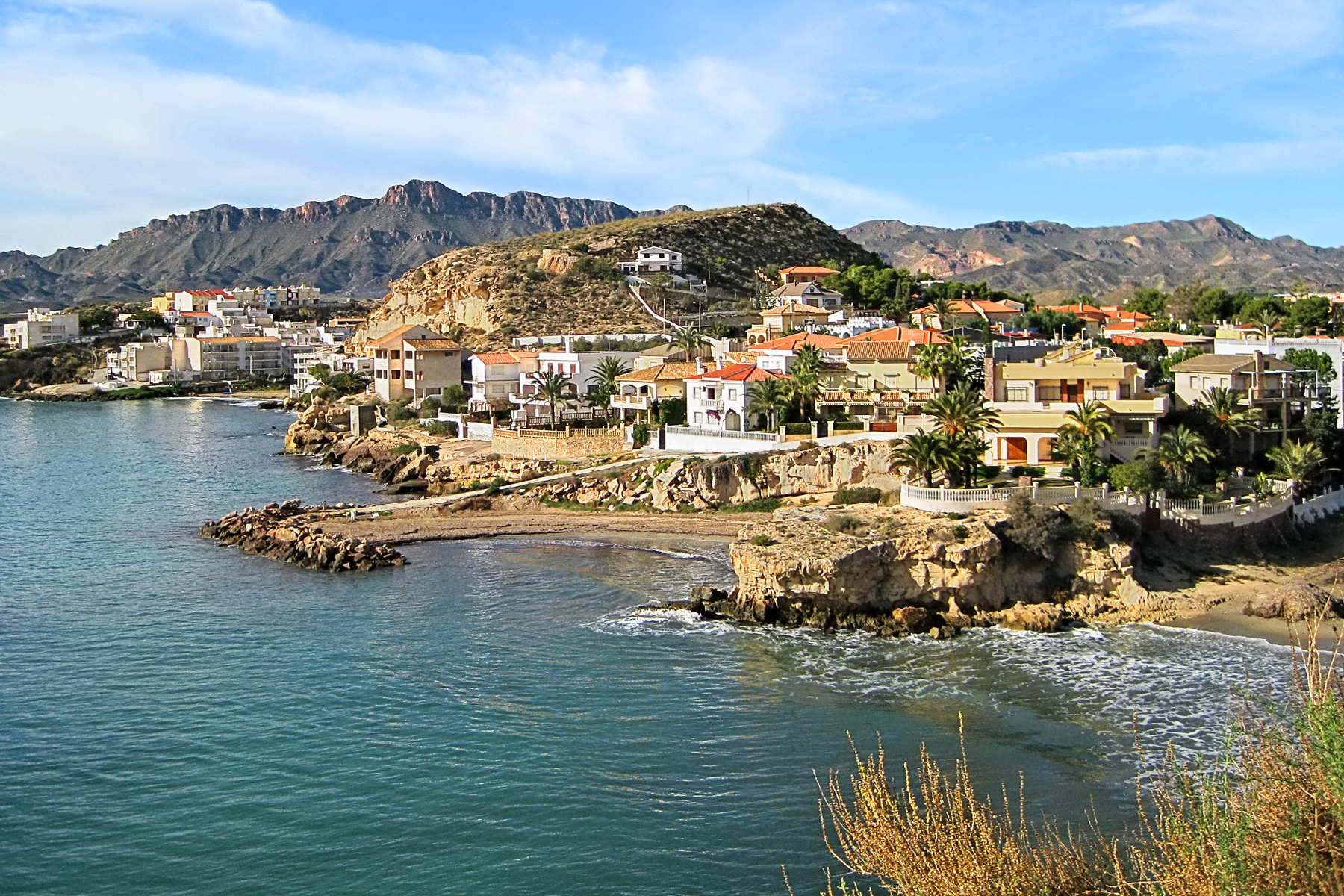
San Juan de los Terreros

San Juan De Los Terreros is the easternmost village of Andalusia. The coastal village has several bays and beaches nearby. San Juan de los Terreros is a few miles along the coast south of Aguilas. The area has supermarkets, chemist, restaurants, tapas bars, coffee shops, ice-cream parlours, and a medical centre. It also has a nightclub during the summer months and a garden center. An open market takes place during the summer each Sunday morning. The small coves in San Juan de Los Terreros have traditional fishermen's cottages on the coastline. A volcanic island, cliffs, and coves are located along the coast.
