= Montgrí Massif =

Mountain range in Spain

Montgrí
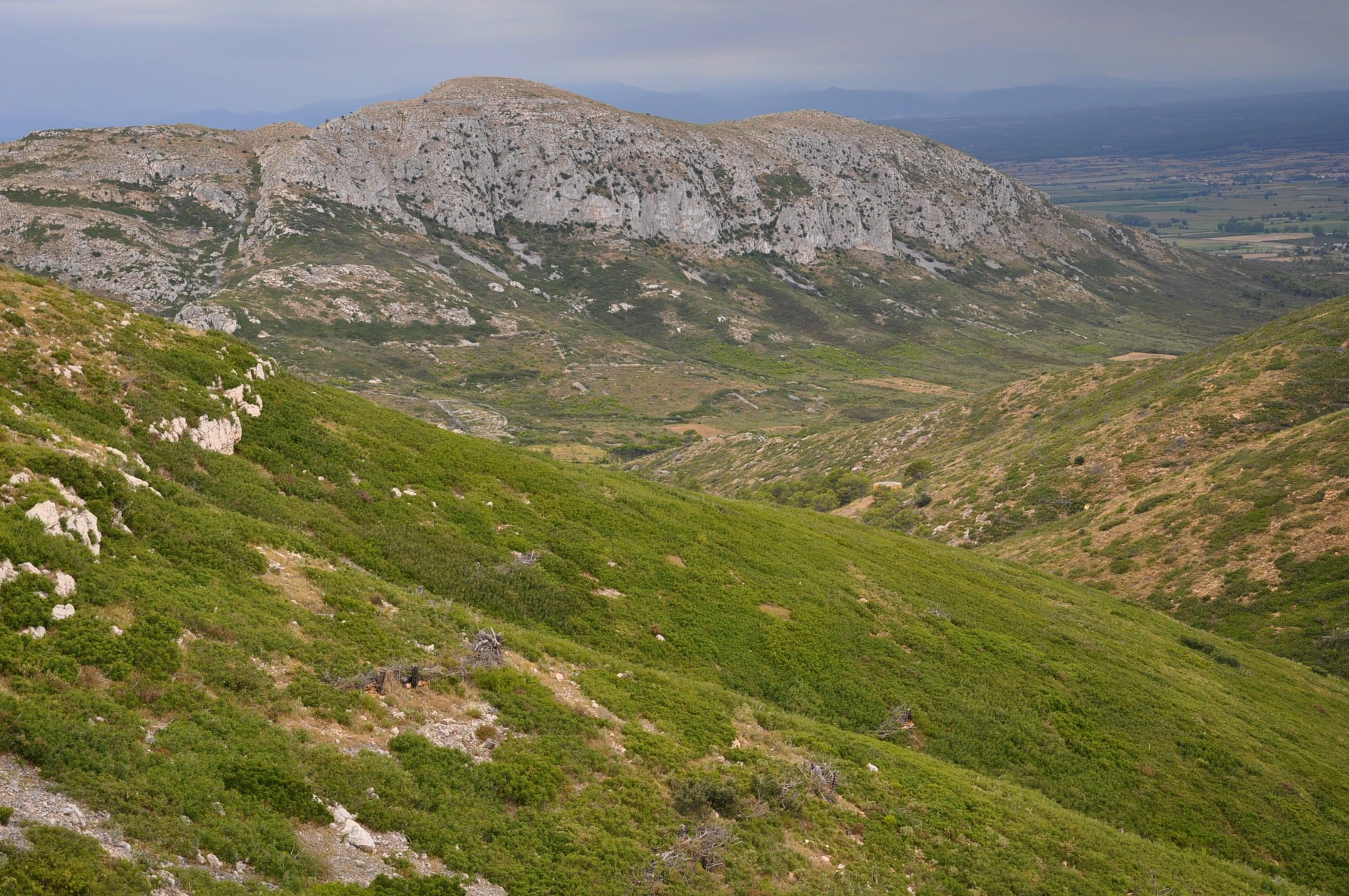
- Landscape in the Montgrí Massif, with the Valley of Santa Caterina and the rocky Puig Rodó

Highest point
- Elevation: 310.8 m (1,020 ft)
- Coordinates: 42°03′42″N 3°07′15″E

Geography
- Location within Catalonia
- Location: Baix Empordà (Catalonia)
- Parent range: Catalan Coastal Range

Geology
- Mountain type: Calcareous

Climbing
- First ascent: Unknown
- Easiest route: From Torroella de Montgrí

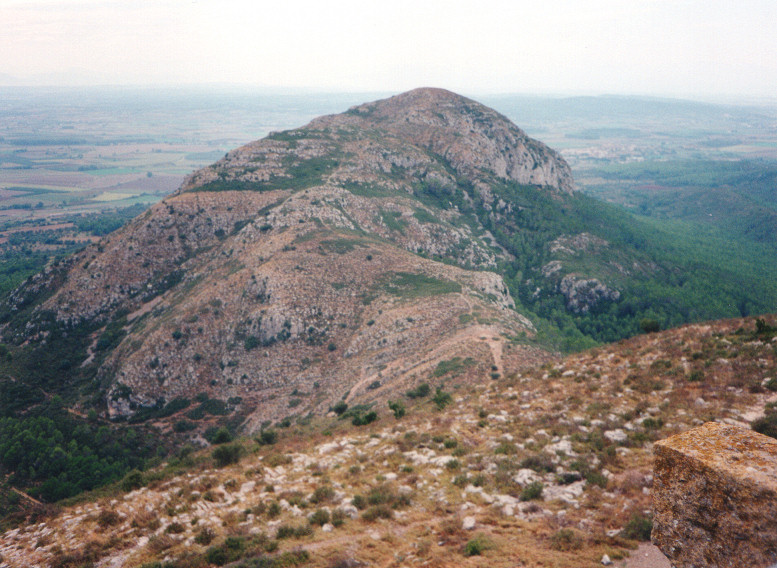
The Puig Rodó in the Montgrí Massif

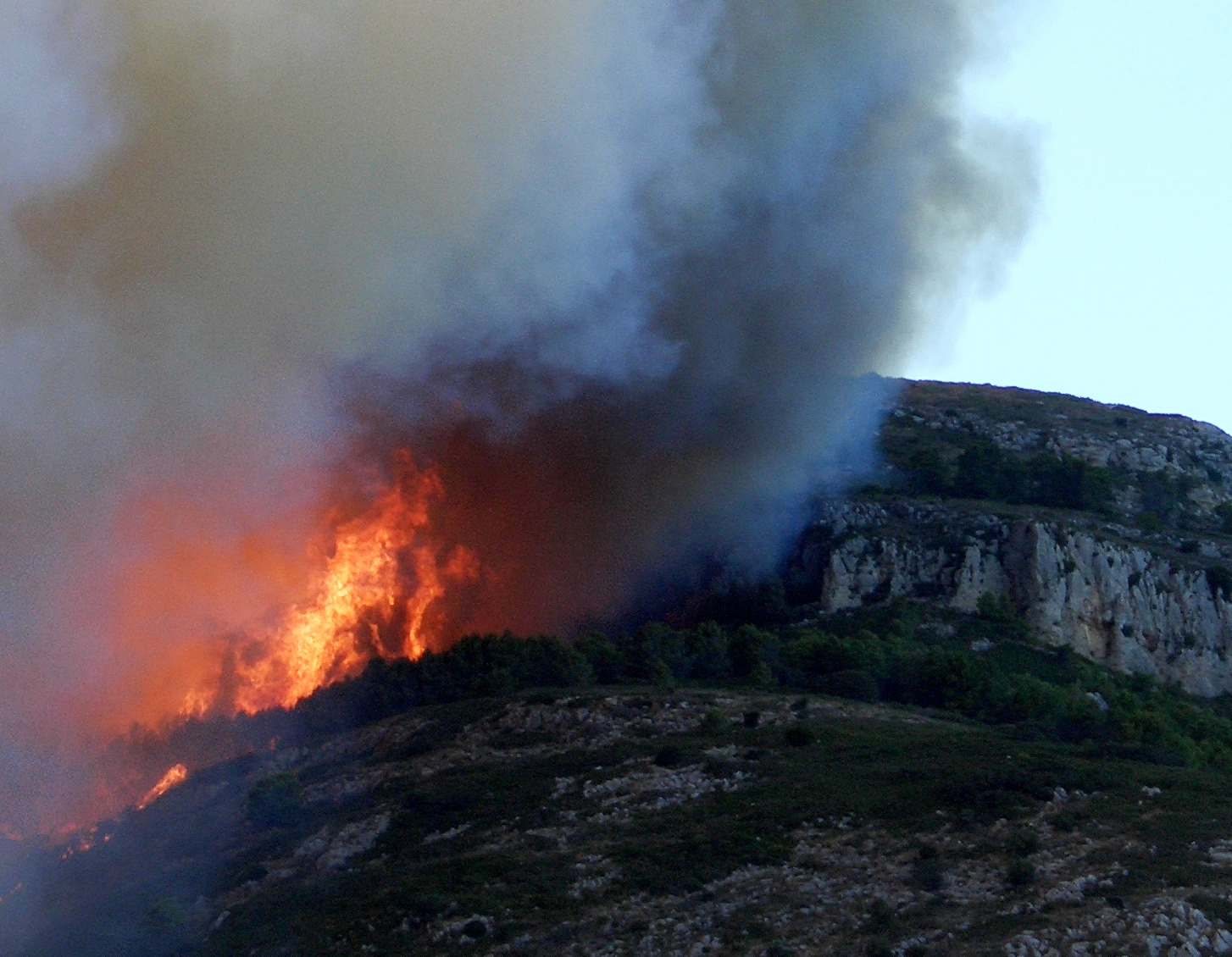
The Montgrí in flames

The Montgrí (Catalan pronunciation: [muŋˈɡɾi]) is a small mountain range in Catalonia, on the north bank of the Ter river. It is part of the Catalan Coastal Range and its highest point is 311 m.

== Features ==
The Montgrí Massif stretches from east to west north of the town of Torroella de Montgrí, sheltering it from the Tramontana northern wind. Local people call it simply "el Montgrí".

This long mountain formation looks like a sleeping bishop seen from afar. The Montgrí Massif is topped by an ancient fortress in the middle, the Montgrí Castle. Local people say the castle is the ring on the sleeping bishop's hand.

It is a largely denuded karstic mountain, beaten by the persistent winds that blow in the region. It has some dunes at its feet, on its northern side, which formed by windblown sand coming from the shores of distant Roses. These dunes were fixed about a century ago by and lie now covered under low forest.

The Medes Islands further east, beyond the town of l'Estartit, are a geological prolongation of this massif.

== Ecology ==
The vegetation on this massif consists mostly of low Mediterranean scrub among rocks. There are some clumps of Mediterranean fan palm (Chamaerops humilis), being one of the northernmost locations where this small palm grows wild. The lower edges of the mountain have some mediterranean forest, made up mainly of pine (Pinus halepensis), as well as some cork oak (Quercus suber) and oak (Quercus sp.).

The owls (Bubo bubo) nest in some of the caves on the sides of the long hill system. There is a variety of endemic land snail inhabiting this mountain range.

Formerly there were vineyards on the side of the Montgrí. They were abandoned in the 19th century following severe phylloxera plagues. Remains of the ancient vineyards can still be seen.

The Montgrí Massif is often ravaged by wildfires, especially during long dry spells; the last serious fire was in 2004.
