= Marc Hauser (skydiver) =

Swiss skydiver

- Born: 1971 (age 54–55)
- Occupations: Professional skydiver, artist entrepreneur, motivational speaker
- Website: http://www.speed-tracking.com/english/

Marc Hauser is a professional Swiss skydiver, artist and entrepreneur. He is the founder of speed tracking and holds the world record for the fastest horizontal free fall. Hauser is also the founder of Erfolgswelle AG, a communications agency.

== Career ==
=== Speed tracking ===
Hauser is the founder of speed tracking, a form of skydiving. The goal of the discipline is to achieve the fastest forward speed possible in free fall relative to the ground.

Hauser gained his first experience skydiving at the age of 18. At the age of 35 he received specialized training from Thomas Naef and Rolf Kuratle, two members of the Babylon Freefall Skydiving team, in Skydive Empuriabrava (Empuriabrava, Spain).

He completed his first speed tracking attempt in 2009. In October 2012, Hauser set the world record for the fastest horizontal free fall in Empuriabrava, Spain. Hauser did not use specialized equipment to accelerate his speed.

=== Chasing the Jet Stream - Guinness World Record ===
Marc Hauser is also the first human ever to perform a free fall jump into the jet stream near Forbes, New South Wales, Australia, on 30 June 2018.

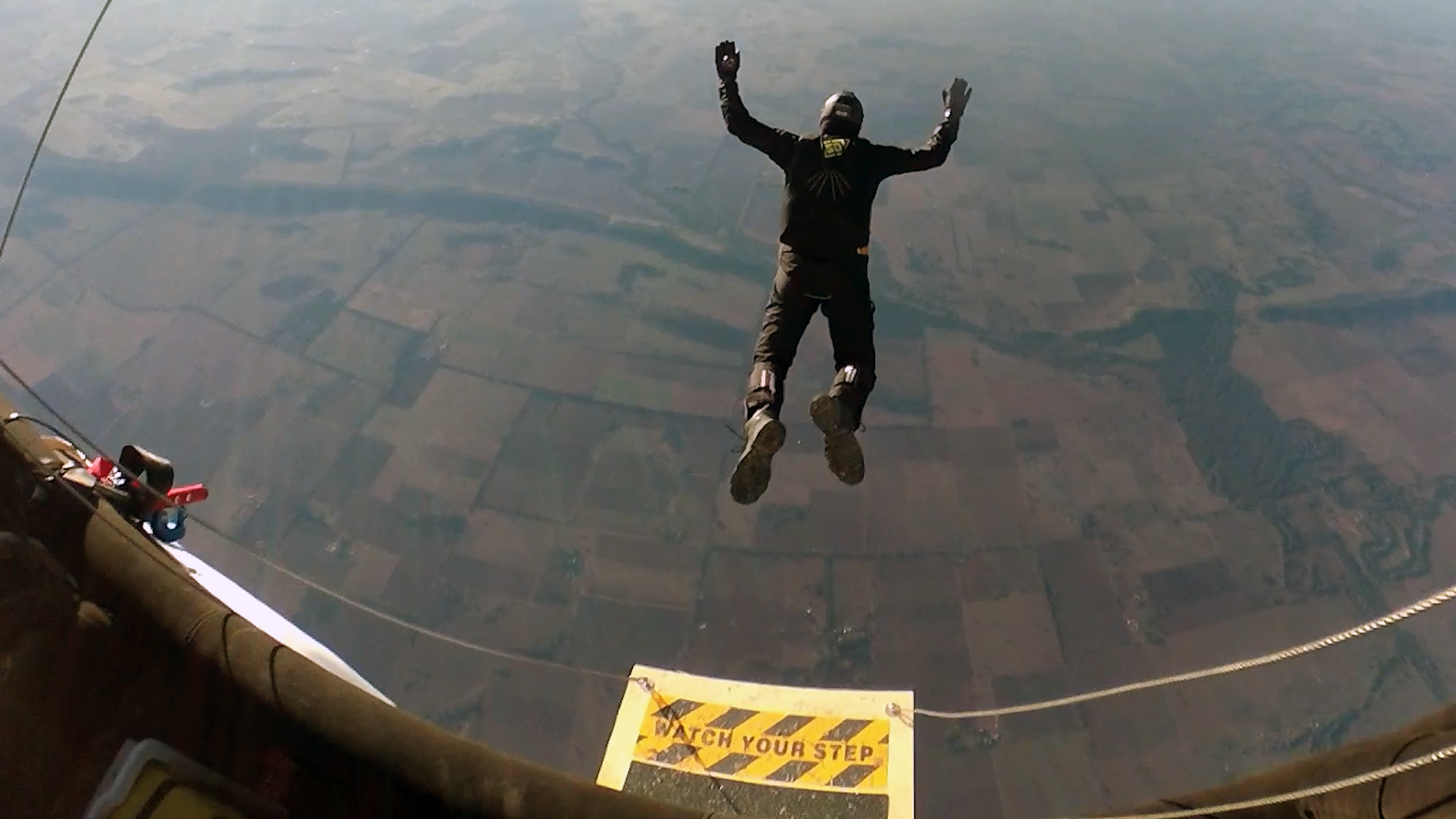
Forbes/Australia: Marc Hauser jumping into the jet stream on 30 June 2018.

As skydiving suit he was wearing a thermal protection jumpsuit without wings (no wingsuit).

The exit altitude of the jump was at 7,400 m / 24,000 ft above sea level, the temperature at -40 °C / -40 °F. At exit altitude the jet stream speed was 137 km/h (85 mph). The groundspeed / horizontal speed of Marc performing this free fall skydive was at 270 km/h (167 mph). During his free fall Hauser covered a horizontal distance of 5.9 km / 3.66 miles in total. Hauser opened his parachute at 2,000 m / 6,500 ft altitude above ground.

The BBC World News documentary Chasing the Jet Stream covers the free fall jump into the jet stream in three parts, which aired on 2, 8 and 15 December 2018. The documentary highlights both Marc Hauser's goal to raise awareness for cleantech-pioneering enterprises using airborne wind energy systems, as well as the execution of the preparations that eventually lead to the free fall jump into the jet stream.

In 2019, the Guinness World Records honored the parachute jump as the world's first skydive into the jet stream.

== Other projects ==
He created a watch collection with Formex Watch SA, a Swiss watch manufacturer, in October 2013.

Marc Hauser also owns a naming agency erfolgswelle AG Namensagentur and inspires larger audiences as a motivational and keynote speaker.

== Personal life ==
Marc Hauser lives in Bern, Switzerland with his two daughters.

== See also ==
- Tracking (freeflying)
- Skydive Empuriabrava
- Jet Stream
- High-altitude wind power
- Airborne wind turbine
