= Yves Rossy =

Swiss aviation enthusiast (born 1959)

- Rossy in 2008
- Born: Yves Rossy; August 27, 1959 (age 67); Neuchâtel, Switzerland
- Known for: First person to fly a jet engine-powered wing
- Aviation career
- Air force: Swiss Air Force
- Website: yvesrossy.com

Yves Rossy (French pronunciation: [iv ʁɔsi]) (born 27 August 1959) is a Swiss military-trained pilot and aviation enthusiast. He is known as the inventor of a series of experimental individual jet packs, the latest using carbon-fibre wings for flight. Often referred to as "Jetman", Rossy has sometimes tested and presented new versions of his jetpacks in high-profile events staged around the world.

== Early life and career ==
Rossy served as a fighter pilot in the Swiss Air Force, where he flew Dassault Mirage IIIs, Northrop F-5 Tiger IIs, and Hawker Hunters. He piloted Boeing 747s for Swissair, and later for Swiss International Air Lines.

== Jet wingpack ==
Rossy developed and built a wingsuit system comprising a backpack equipped with semi-rigid aeroplane-type carbon-fiber wings—with a span of about 2.4 metres (7.9 ft)—powered by four Jetcat P400 jet engines, modified from large kerosene-fueled model aircraft engines. This has led to him being referred to in the press by various monikers, such as The Airman, Rocketman, Fusionman, and—most commonly—Jetman.

=== Developmental flights ===
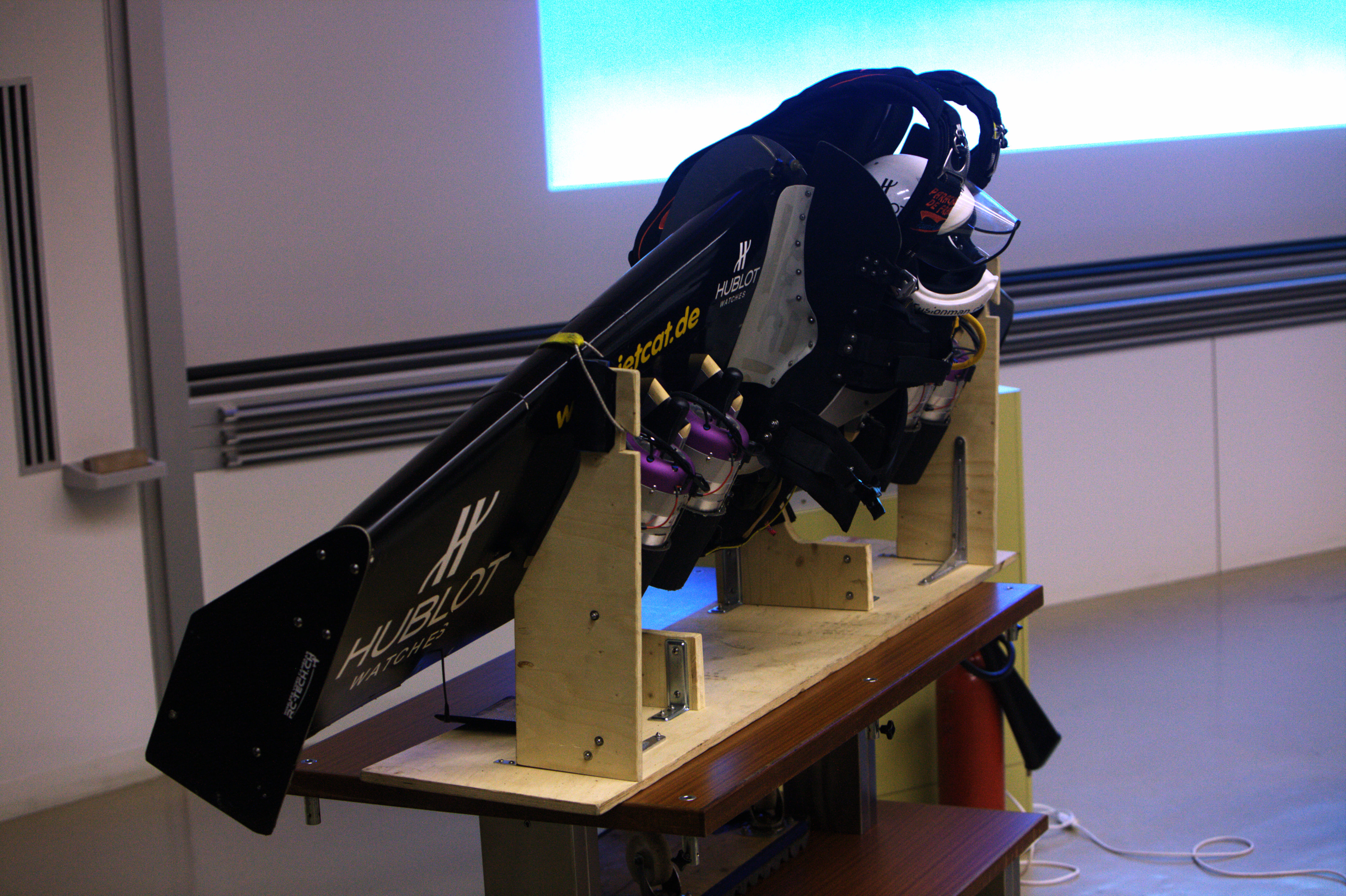
Rossy's jet-powered wing

In December 2006 (in Bex, Switzerland) Rossy became the first to successfully fly horizontally for six minutes using four jet engines and wings strapped on his back. He was quoted as saying: "The idea is to have fun, not to kill yourself".

Since 2007 Rossy has conducted some of his flight tests from a private airfield, Skydive Empuriabrava, in Empuriabrava (Girona, Costa Brava), Spain.

In May 2008 Rossy made a flight over the Alps Mountain Range, reaching a top speed of 304 kilometres per hour (164 kn; 189 mph), and an average speed of 200 km/h (110 kn; 120 mph).

On 26 September 2008, jumping from a Pilatus Porter at an altitude of 2,500 metres (8,200 ft) over Calais, France, Rossy crossed the English Channel with a single jet-powered wing strapped on his back, wearing only a helmet and a flight suit for protection. Reaching speeds of up to 190 kilometres per hour (120 mph), he made the 35 km (22 mi; 19 nmi) flight to England in 13 minutes, where he deployed his parachute and landed in Dover becoming the first person to cross the Channel in this manner.

In November 2009 Rossy attempted a crossing of the Strait of Gibraltar, hoping to be the first person to fly between two continents using a "Jet pack". He leapt from a small plane about 1,950 m (6,400 ft) above Tangier in Morocco and headed in the direction of Atlanterra, Spain. The flight was expected to take about a quarter of an hour. Strong winds and cloud banks forced Rossy to ditch into the sea just 4.8 km; 2.6 nmi (3 miles) from the Spanish coast, where his support helicopter picked him up ten minutes later, unhurt. The Spanish Coast Guard retrieved the jetpack, which was equipped with a parachute and float.

On 5 November 2010 Rossy flew a new version of his jet-powered flight system and successfully performed two aerial loops before landing via parachute. He had launched from a hot air balloon piloted by Brian Jones at 2,400 meters (7,900 feet).

On 7 May 2011 Rossy flew above the Grand Canyon in Arizona. The United States Federal Aviation Administration (FAA) had classified his flight system as an aircraft. When it finally granted him a license, the FAA waived the normal 25 to 40 hours of flight testing time, and Rossy acted quickly to complete his flight.

== Latest media and event appearances ==
Rossy was featured on an episode of Stan Lee's Superhumans. He has appeared on the BBC's Top Gear Season 18 Episode 5, where he raced Richard Hammond and Toni Gardemeister.

Rossy was a main attraction at the 2013 Experimental Aircraft Association AirVenture Fly-In, America's largest fly-in.

Rossy was also featured (not in person) in the South Australian Primary School's Music Festival in 2014, when the theme of the Festival was flight. The song, 'Jetman', was written by Paul Jarman about Yves Rossy.

=== October 2015 sustained flight ===
On 13 October 2015, Rossy and Vince Reffet, wearing jetpacks, deployed from a helicopter flying at 5,500 feet (1,700 meters) and flew in a choreographed demonstration with an Emirates Airbus A380 cruising at an altitude of 4,000 feet (1,200 meters) over Dubai. These stunts were done while Rossy was working with the Jetman Dubai team. The flights were documented by the use of helmet-mounted cameras and third-party videos released in early November 2015. The videos show the pair soaring and diving around the airliner, flying in formation with it for about ten minutes.

A television program "City in the Sky, part 2" about how airliner flights are run, showed at its start Yves Rossy and Vince Reffet flying with Rossy-type jetpacks, to show some principles of how airliners fly. It said that before being allowed to jetpack-fly in Britain, he had to get himself registered as an airplane, because parts of his body, rather than parts of his jetpack, acted as control surfaces; but he was exempted from the seat-belt rule. It showed him being lifted to flying height on the outside of a helicopter. He had to fall a distance to build up enough air speed for his airfoils to work.

=== 2019 VTOL demonstration and end of Jetman Dubai relationship ===
In November 2019, Rossy demonstrated the ability to take off, hover, and land without external assistance. Rossy also announced on his website in July 2019 that he had parted ways with the Jetman Dubai team.

=== 2020 Dubai ground takeoff ===
VTOL and transition to horizontal flight was demonstrated in February 2020 with Vince Reffet piloting the Rossy-type Jetpack on behalf of Jetman Dubai. It's not clear if Rossy had direct involvement in this effort, as it took place after Rossy announced his disassociation from Jetman Dubai.
