= Tracking (skydiving) =

Technique to increase horizontal speed while skydiving

Tracking is a technique used by skydivers during freefall to increase their horizontal speed. Tracking is considered a fundamental skill in the sport because it allows multiple skydivers to gain separation from each other prior to deploying their parachutes. Nearly all licensing organizations mandate a student show proficiency at tracking in order to obtain their skydiving license.

== Technique ==
Although there are many variations of the basic body position it essentially involves the skydiver moving out of the traditional face-to-earth & arched position, and straightening the legs, bringing the arms to the sides and de-arching, using the body to cup the air as a means of providing greater lift. There is debate over what exactly constitutes the most efficient tracking position (providing the best glide ratio), especially concerning how far (if at all) the skydiver's legs should be spread. Some variations of the tracking position work well for some individuals and not so well for others. Also, when a skydiver gains experience, his or her preferred body position often changes.

== Glide ratio ==
Good trackers can cover nearly as much ground as the distance they fall, approaching a glide ratio of 1:1. The fall rate of a skydiver in an efficient track is significantly lower than that of one falling in a traditional face-to-earth position; the former reaching speeds as low as 40 metres per second (90 mph), the latter averaging around the 54 m/s (120 mph) mark.

== Practices ==
Tracking is regarded as an essential life saving skill for all freefall skydivers engaging in relative work with others, allowing the jumpers to gain horizontal separation after building a formation and before opening their parachutes. Accordingly, the greater the number of skydivers on a jump, the better their tracking skills must be. In addition to having to track a longer distance after break-off (tracking away for separation before opening), they also have to be more aware of other jumpers around them and have to be able to track in a straight line away from the center of the formation.

Tracking is not however purely a life saving skill; many skydivers participate in ‘tracking dives’ where the whole skydive until break-off will be spent tracking. On all tracking dives there should be a designated leader, usually the most proficient tracker, who will plan the horizontal trajectory of the dive. This serves several purposes; first of all, the other trackers will have a target to chase, gauge their relative horizontal speed on and potentially take grips upon.

While considered an area of freeflying, tracking dives are popular amongst many skydivers across the disciplines. Tracking dives are some of the most accessible and sociable dives that everyone regardless of experience level can take part in. Tracking dives are often planned at the end of the day, and with less emphasis on quantitative results (formation skydiving), or on holding difficult and new body positions (freeflying). They are commonly viewed as the most relaxing, low pressure jumps.

Atmonauti dives, a.k.a. "Angled flight", are a recently conceived variant with a significantly different body position, giving a far steeper flight angle between traditional track and head down. Tracking and Atmonauti dives are considered by most skydivers (wingsuiting notwithstanding) to go the furthest towards the feeling of ‘true flight’ due to the large horizontal distances covered, the low terminal velocity, and the fact that at such heights the ground does not appear to be approaching at all.

On October 5, 2012, the Swiss Marc Hauser set a first world record in speed tracking, a discipline he founded. The measured ground speed was 304 kilometres per hour (188.9 mph) over the dropzone of Skydive Empuriabrava, Spain. Only a specially adapted skydiving suit was used (no wingsuit, tracking suit, nor additional weights were used).

== Safety ==
Even though inexperienced jumpers often take part on tracking dives, the risks of such dives should not be underestimated. An efficient track can reach horizontal speeds of nearly 160 kilometres per hour (100 mph) (one experienced diver was witnessed to keep pace with a twin-engine plane as it took off from DeLand Municipal Airport in 1995, thus registering his speed in excess of 185 km/h (115 mph)). Collisions with other groups or with members of one's own group would result in serious injury or death. For this reason the number of inexperienced jumpers on a tracking dive should be limited by the organizer.
