= Airplane wingsuit formation =

Wingsuit flying carried out in proximity to a powered aircraft

Airplane wingsuit formation (AWF) is a sub‑discipline of wingsuit flying in which wingsuit pilots exit an aircraft or jump from a cliff and fly a predetermined formation in close proximity to the jump plane. Developed from experimental stunts in the late 1990s, AWF matured in the 2010s into an organised niche of air‑sports with documented record attempts and safety protocols.

== History ==
=== Pioneering flights (1997 – 2016) ===
- In July 1997 French wingsuit pioneer Patrick de Gayardon jumped from a Pilatus PC-6 Porter over Chamonix and—after a short glide—flew back into the same aircraft, demonstrating the first documented “plane‑re‑entry” with a modern wingsuit.
- Between 2013 and 2016 several European wingsuit teams conducted informal formation flights alongside Pilatus PC-6 and Cessna jump planes in France and Spain, laying the groundwork for standardised exit order, reference speeds and vertical separation. Coverage of those early gatherings appeared in ParaMag and regional aviation media.

=== “A Door in the Sky” (2017) ===
On 13 October 2017 the French duo Fred Fugen and Vincent Reffet (Soul Flyers) BASE jumped from the 4,158 m Jungfrau in the Swiss Alps and successfully re‑entered a light aircraft in flight, after more than 100 training sorties of plane‑to‑wingsuit‑to‑plane formation flying. Although primarily a BASE‑jump stunt, the training programme formalised many of the safety margins (closing speeds, converging angles, radio calls) later adopted by AWF organisers.

== Organised record attempts ==
Year	Location	Aircraft	Planned wingsuiters	Status / size	Primary organiser
2018	Portimão, Algarve, Portugal	1 × PC‑6 Porter, 1 x Cessna 208	14	**First recognised AWF world record** – 14‑way formation, 23 Dec 2018	Daniel Ossio
2019	Elbląg, Poland (Baltic Wingsuit Meet)	2 × Turbo Finist SMG‑92	18	**Second world record** – 18‑way, 25 Aug 2019	Daniel Ossio, Piotr Walasek
2021	Schlierstadt, Germany	Pilatus PC-6	9 + 1 camera	German national AWF record – 9‑way (unofficial)	Daniel Ossio

- Record sizes refer to the number of wingsuit pilots stably linked to the aircraft or to one another for ≥5 s while remaining within 10 m lateral distance and 30 m longitudinal separation, per the community rule‑set published by Ossio (2021).*

== Technique and safety ==
AWF organisers typically brief three distinct phases:

1. Staggered exit – wingsuiters leave the aircraft in a planned and quick way to speed up the formation build-up.
2. Formation build – pilots adopt a shallow descent (<100 knots CAS, <–3,000 ft min⁻¹) while wingsuiters accelerate to match and build up the formation.
3. Break‑off / optional re‑entry – at a planned altitude (≈3,000 ft AGL) wingsuiters slow down to safe separation or, for re‑entry, synchronise with the aircraft’s slipstream and enter.

Common risk factors include aircraft strikes, wake‑turbulence instability and loss of situational awareness in multi‑ship formations.

== Involved airplanes ==
To date, the following unmodified airplane types have been flying with unpropelled wingsuiters:

- Pilatus PC-6 Porter
- Cessna 208 Caravan (Short and Grand)
- PAC P-750 XSTOL
- Technoavia SM92 Finist Turbo Finist
- PZL-104 Wilga (Draco Version)
- Dornier Do 28

== See also ==
- Aerial refueling – analogous closure problems
