= Babylon Freefly =

French skydiving team

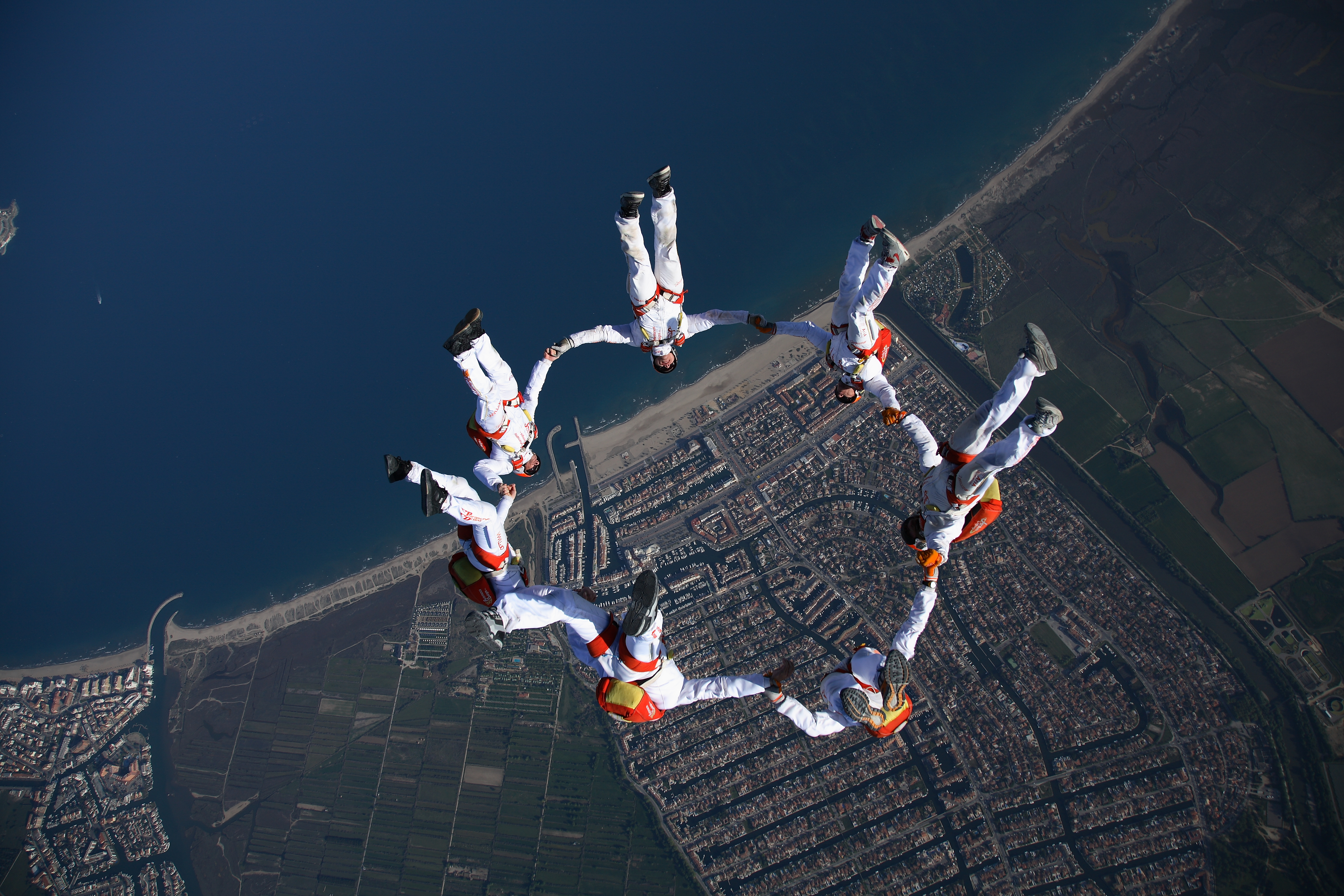
Babylon Freefly performing an upside-down jump formation

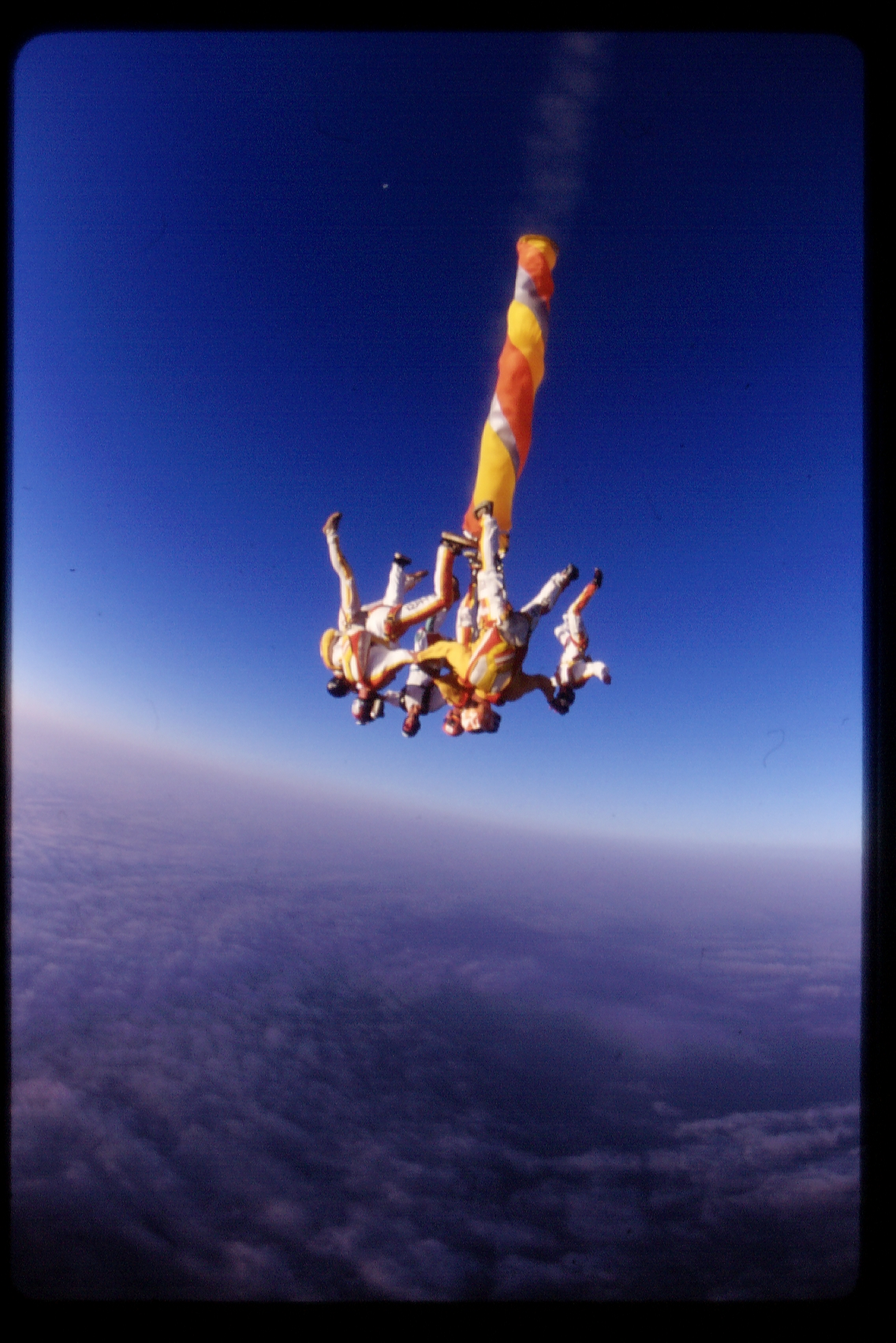
The flying tube was Sylvain Turina's invention

Babylon Freefly is a French skydiving team that was formed in 1998 by Stephane Fardel in Empuriabrava, and has grown into one of the oldest and most successful freeflying teams in the history of skydiving.

The team is composed by (2025) : Stephane Fardel, Cathy Bouette, Mickael Lamy, Théo Verry, Tom Rigaudeau, and Pierre Bastien.

== Career and history ==
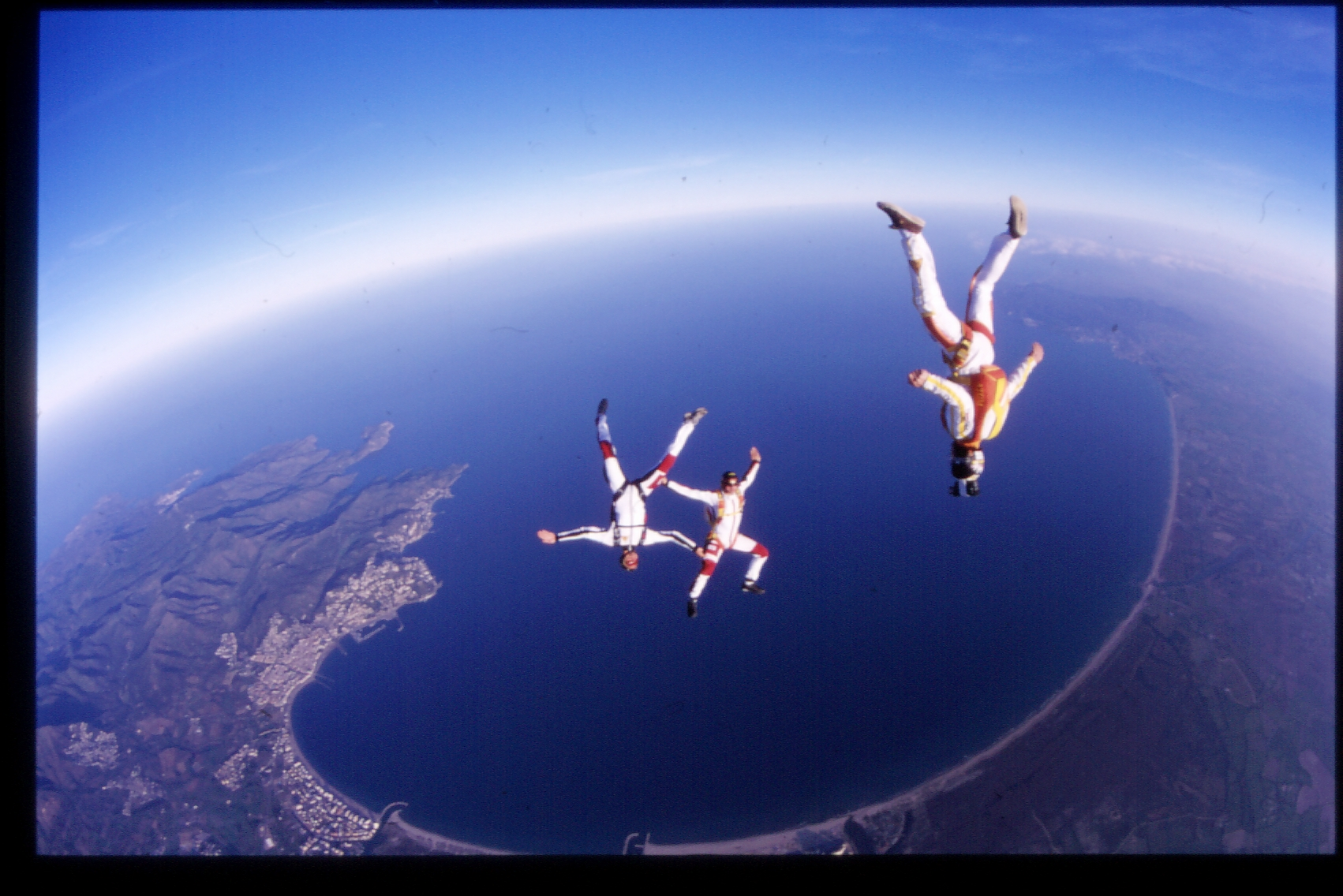
Babylon Freefly jumping at Skydive Empuriabrava

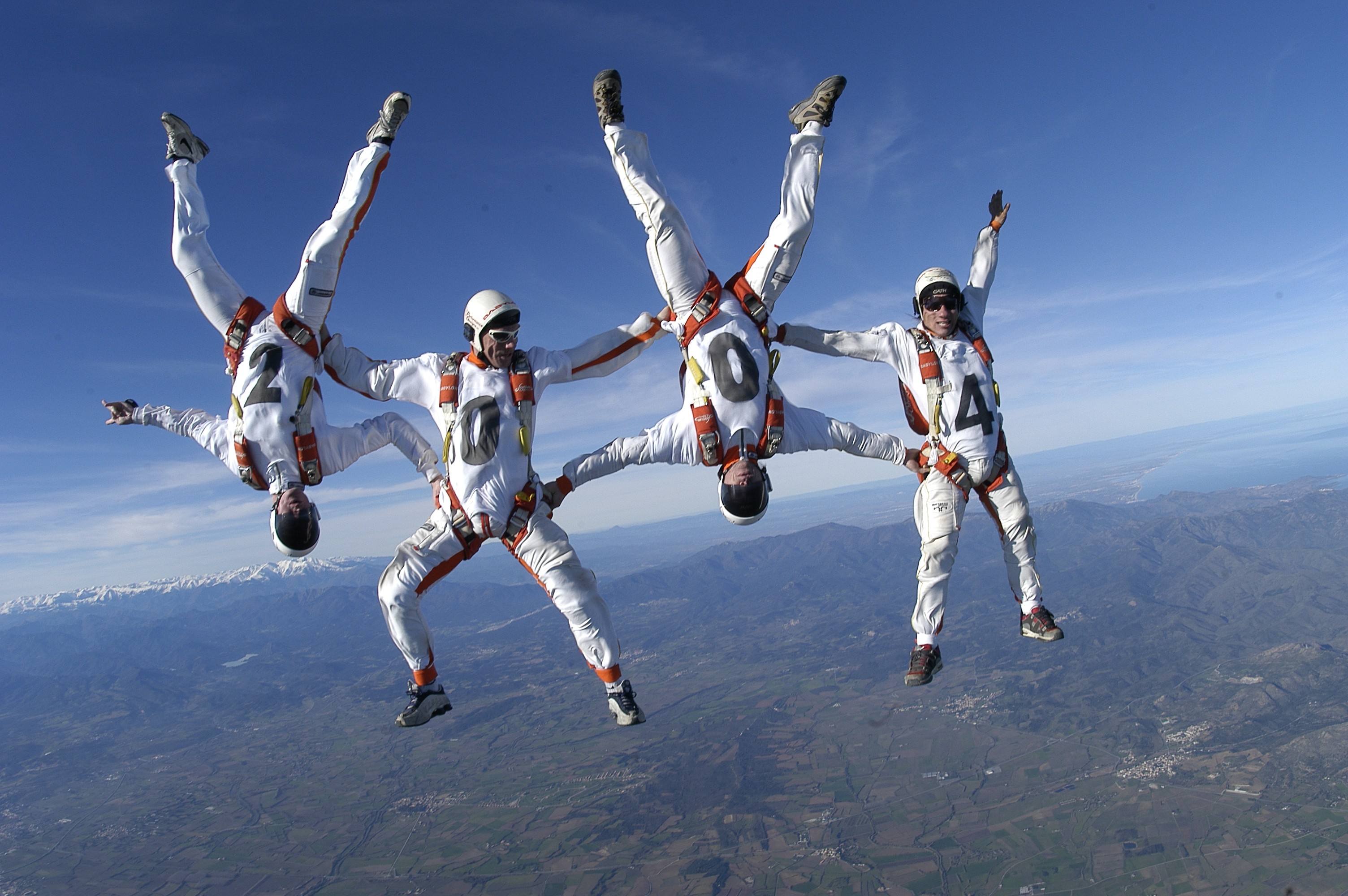
Babylon Freefly in 2004

Stephane Fardel founded Babylon Freefly in 1996 with Sylvain Turina. Two years later the Babylon Freefly School became an official company. "Airplanes and skydiving have always been part of my life, my parents being skydivers", explained Fardel when asked how it all began.

Babylon Freefly is the longest running and most successful team in the history of freeflying. Memorable events include Sylvain's invention of the flying tube, and winning the very first official FAI Freefly World Cup in Eloy in 2000 with team-mates Nicolas Arnaud and Loic Jean-Albert.

Babylon FreeFly is mainly characterized by incorporating tubes into flight and, above all, flying vertically and upside down.

Two decades reveals a vast list of firsts, from an unbroken run of gold medals from 2004 to 2009 with the call sheet including the youngest gold medalist in a then 21-year-old Vince Reffet and the first female freefly world champion in Cathy Bouette. For years Babylon were at the forefront of technical group flying, forming and formulating the way freefly jumps happened at a time when knowledge was being established through trial and error, answering questions like, how do you launch an eight-way vertical formation into the wind? Or how do we continue to evolve and move forward while maintaining an acceptable level of safety in freeflying, as plans get more ambitious and groups get larger?

Babylon can attribute part of its success to a strong symbiotic relationship with that of its home at Skydive Empuriabrava (Costa Brava, Girona, Spain). The dropzone has become one of a select few around the world that has carved a position beyond merely being a place to skydive. "Babylon and Skydive Empuriabrava have always worked closely together since the creation of the Freefly School," explains Fardel. "It’s the biggest dropzone in Europe and having a Pilatus Porter, a Beechcraft 99, and a Twin Otter is a great asset. Not to mention the weather, the amazing landscape, the marina town and all the side activities that the area offers."

It is easier to think of Babylon Freefly as a school or, better yet, as a ‘platform’ from which to launch competitive teams, progress students, organise events and work toward the goal of pushing the sport forward.

== Records ==
Babylon Freefly team has won six gold medals in Freefly Skydiving competitions at the World Class Level: World Cup discipline in 2005, 2007, and 2009, and the World Air Games in 2006, 2008, and 2010. The highly qualified team consists of professional skydivers, coaches, photographers, and directors.

The Babylon team has been involved in many airshows as the Red Bull Air Races attracts more than a million spectators and millions of viewers online and on television.

== Babylon Productions and air shows ==
Babylon FreeFly has been involved in projects including television commercials for Peugeot and Nintendo, appearing in the annual air show of the crown prince of Abu Dhabi, and action films like Secret Agents, Largo Winch 2, and the Bollywood Movie Zindagi Na Milegi Dobara.

== School ==
The school is headquartered at Skydive Empuriabrava in Girona, Costa Brava, Spain, and consists of instructors from France, Switzerland, Australia, Belgium, South Africa and Venezuela that have more than 80,000 jumps.
