= JetCat P400 =

Minute turbojet engine

The JetCat P400 is a small turbojet engine manufactured by JetCat and used to power fixed-wing model aircraft and some jet packs.

== Applications ==
- Jet wingpack
- Lockheed Martin X-56
- Ukrainian Jet-Powered Long-Range Attack Drone (OWA-UAVs)

== Specifications ==
Data from

==== General characteristics ====
- Type: turbojet
- Length: 376 mm
- Diameter: 148 mm
- Dry weight: 4,140 g (9.13 lb)

==== Components ====
- Compressor: centrifugal
- Fuel type: kerosene

==== Performance ====
- Maximum thrust: 425 N (96 lbf)
- Overall pressure ratio: 3.8
