= Lockheed Martin X-56 =

American modular unmanned aerial vehicle

X-56
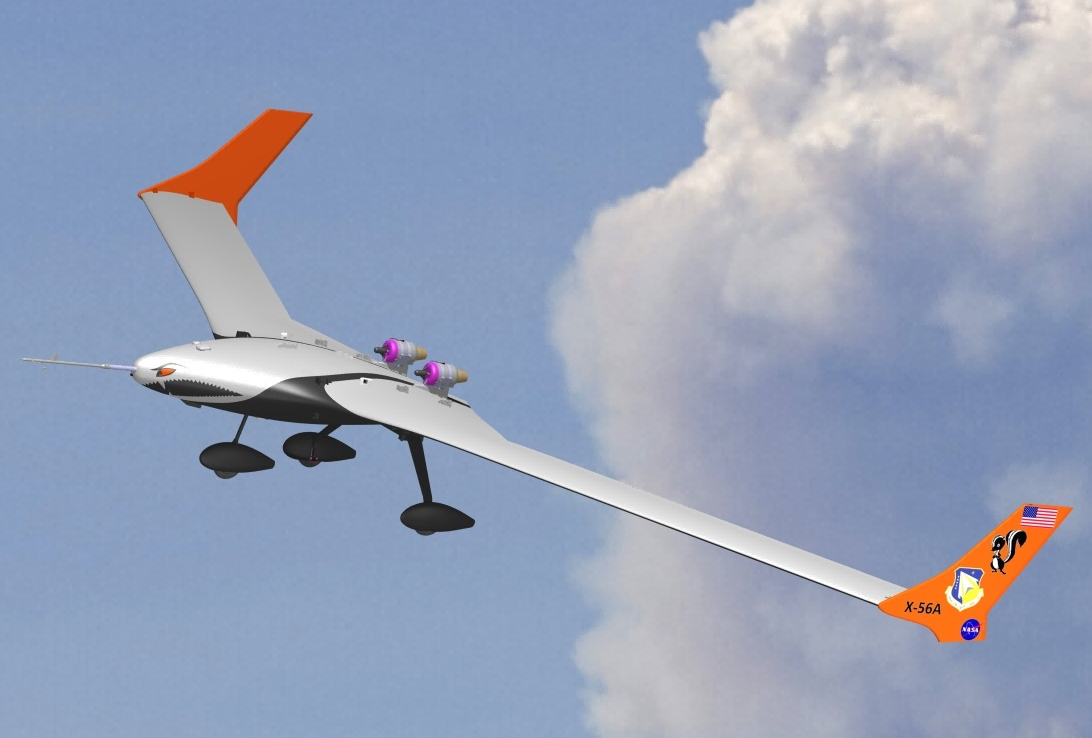
- Rendering of the X-56A in flight

General information
- Type: Experimental aircraft
- National origin: United States
- Manufacturer: Lockheed Martin Skunk Works
- Primary users: NASA Air Force Research Laboratory
- Number built: 2

History
- First flight: 26 July 2013

The Lockheed Martin X-56 is an American modular unmanned aerial vehicle that is being designed to explore High-Altitude Long Endurance (HALE) flight technologies for use in future military unmanned reconnaissance aircraft.

== Design and development ==
Designed by Lockheed Martin's Advanced Development Programs, known informally as the Skunk Works, the aircraft was first revealed by Aviation Week, and is intended to research active flutter suppression and gust-load alleviation technologies. The X-56A is based on Lockheed's earlier UAV work, showing influence from the Polecat, Sentinel and DarkStar UAVs. The program calls for the construction of two 7.5 feet (2.3 m)-long fuselages and a wingspan of 27.5 ft, with four sets of wings being constructed for flight testing.

== Operational history ==
The X-56A first flew on 26 July 2013, flying from Edwards Air Force Base; twenty flights were to be flown on behalf of the Air Force Research Laboratory before the aircraft would be handed over to NASA for further testing.

The first X-56A unmanned aircraft was severely damaged in a crash shortly after takeoff from the dry lakebed at Edwards AFB, California, on 19 November 2015, on its first flexible-wing flight to test active flutter suppression. The aircraft had previously made 16 flights with stiff wings to prove its operating envelope.

The second X-56A unmanned aircraft flew for the first time on 9 April 2015 while under operation by NASA. The aircraft flew eight flights with the stiff wings to clear its operating envelope. The vehicle then completed its first flight with the highly flexible wings on 31 August 2017.

One instability mode, body freedom flutter, was shown to be actively suppressed by the digital flight control at 110 kn (200 km/h), within its normal flight envelope. Slender, flexible and lighter low-drag wings would be enabled by flutter suppression.

X-56B was destroyed in a crash on 9 July 2021 after suffering an "anomaly in flight".

== Specifications (X-56A) ==
Data from

General characteristics

- Crew: 1 (flown by remote control from ground-based console)
- Length: 7.5 ft (2.3 m)
- Wingspan: 27.5 ft (8.4 m)
- Powerplant: 2 × Jetcat P400 turbojets, 88.7 lbf (0.395 kN) thrust each

Performance

- Maximum speed: 138.1 mph (222.3 km/h, 120.0 kn)

== See also ==
Related lists

- List of experimental aircraft
- List of X-planes
