= Speed flying and speed riding =

Flying hybrid sports

Speed flying and speed riding are recreational and competitive adventure sports of flying lightweight, free-flying, foot-launched glider aircraft with no rigid primary structure. They are similar sports to paragliding, but have smaller wings, higher flying speeds, and flightpaths descending close to a mountain slope. Speed flying and speed riding are very similar, but differ in that speed-flying is launched on foot while speed-riding is a winter sport done on skis.

== Comparison to paragliding and parachuting ==
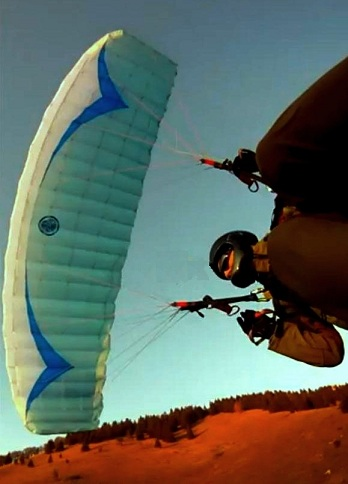

Speed flying/riding is a hybrid sport that combines elements of paragliding, parachuting and freeriding to create a new sport. Like paragliding, speed flying is done by launching from a slope with the wing overhead, already inflated by the incoming air. The main difference between speed flying and paragliding is that speed flying is meant to create a fast, thrilling ride close to the slope, while the point of paragliding is usually to maintain a longer, gentler flight, never touching the ground before landing. The fast landing technique for speed wings, when flying without skis, is similar to that used in parachuting. However, parachuting or skydiving is done from a plane or fixed object (BASE jumping), and the wing is designed to arrest the free fall. Newer designs of hybrid-wings (also called mini-wings) are now being produced to allow a high speed "hike and fly" from mountainous areas. They can be soared in strong laminar winds and thermalled similar to paragliders, and may also be trimmed for a more traditional speed flying descent.

== History ==
In the late 1970s, French mountaineers began launching parachutes from steep mountains on foot (ground launching) and with skis. Modifications to these parachutes evolved into larger, easier to launch wings now called paragliders, and parachute ground launching remained largely forgotten. However, advances in material and parachute swooping events inspired a new generation of pilots in France and America about 20 years later. Foot-launched parachute slalom course competitions known as blade running (or runner) competitions started in the Western United States in 1996 and continue with the Blade Raid since 2005. An American team of stunt parachutists expanded the sport, making stunt videos skimming mountain slopes in the Alps from 2001 to 2002. One team member opened the first "Ground Launching School" for foot-launched parachutes in 2004 in California, US.

On 7 February 2001 in Valfréjus (French Alps), as skydivers and paragliders Frédéric Fugen, Frank Coupat and Vince Reffet were stuck with conditions too windy for paragliding, Fugen floated the idea of flying his parachute, flung upward while skiing a steep freeride face. This succeeded and became the hobby of a small group of 5 pilots (Frédéric Fugen, Frank Coupat, David Eyraud, François Bon, Antoine Montant), who coined the term speed-riding ('riding' from freeride skiing, and 'speed' for the velocity that gives non-rigid wings their aerodynamic properties, thus an important element of reliability and adding to freeriding the possibility to just fly fast and safe over dangerous alpine portions such as rocks, glacier seracss and crevasses, or avalanche-prone terrain). Alternating between skiing and flying phases is considered the essence of speed riding. The term speed-flying was later coined for the continuation of the practice in summer, without skis, with a slightly lower wing loading (no skiing gear + often larger wings).

Speed riding video

In 2005, a group of French pilots began experimenting with modified parachute and parafoil kite designs. One of them, Francois Bon, a paraglider test pilot, unsatisfied with foot-launched parachute performance, helped perfect the first speed wing design, the Gin Nano. This evolved into other commercial wings (between 9 and 14 square metres) designed for speed, portability, and a glide ratio much lower than a paraglider but higher than a parachute. Today speed gliders are produced by over 30 manufacturers worldwide. France hosted the first yearly speed flying competition, "Speed Flying Pro Les Arcs", in January 2007, which continued to be dominated by pioneer speed flyer Antoine Montant until his death in 2011.

On 2 February 2006, the French Free Flight Association (FFVL) officially recognized speed riding as an independent sport under its umbrella. On 9 February 2007, in the aftermath of renowned guide Sébastien Gay's fatal speedflying accident near Verbier, the Swiss Federal Office of Civil Aviation likened skiing with a speedflyer to paragliding from a training and insurance perspective, and entrusted the Swiss Hang Gliding and Paragliding Association (SHV/FSVL) with the mission, for satefy purposes.

The sport has grown rapidly since its inception, particularly in France and Switzerland, with an estimated 3,000 to 5,000 speed wing pilots all over the world. Speed wing pilots have already garnered media attention with rapid descents from summits such as Aconcagua in the Andes and various peaks in the Alps. There are established flying sites all over the globe, including dedicated ski runs at several resorts in France, and over 100 instructors in around 20 different countries. The new air sport has many written forms (such as speedflying, speed-flying, speed flying, speed riding, speedriding, speed-riding, skigliding, ski-gliding, ski gliding, ski flying, ski-flying and ground launching).

== The wing ==
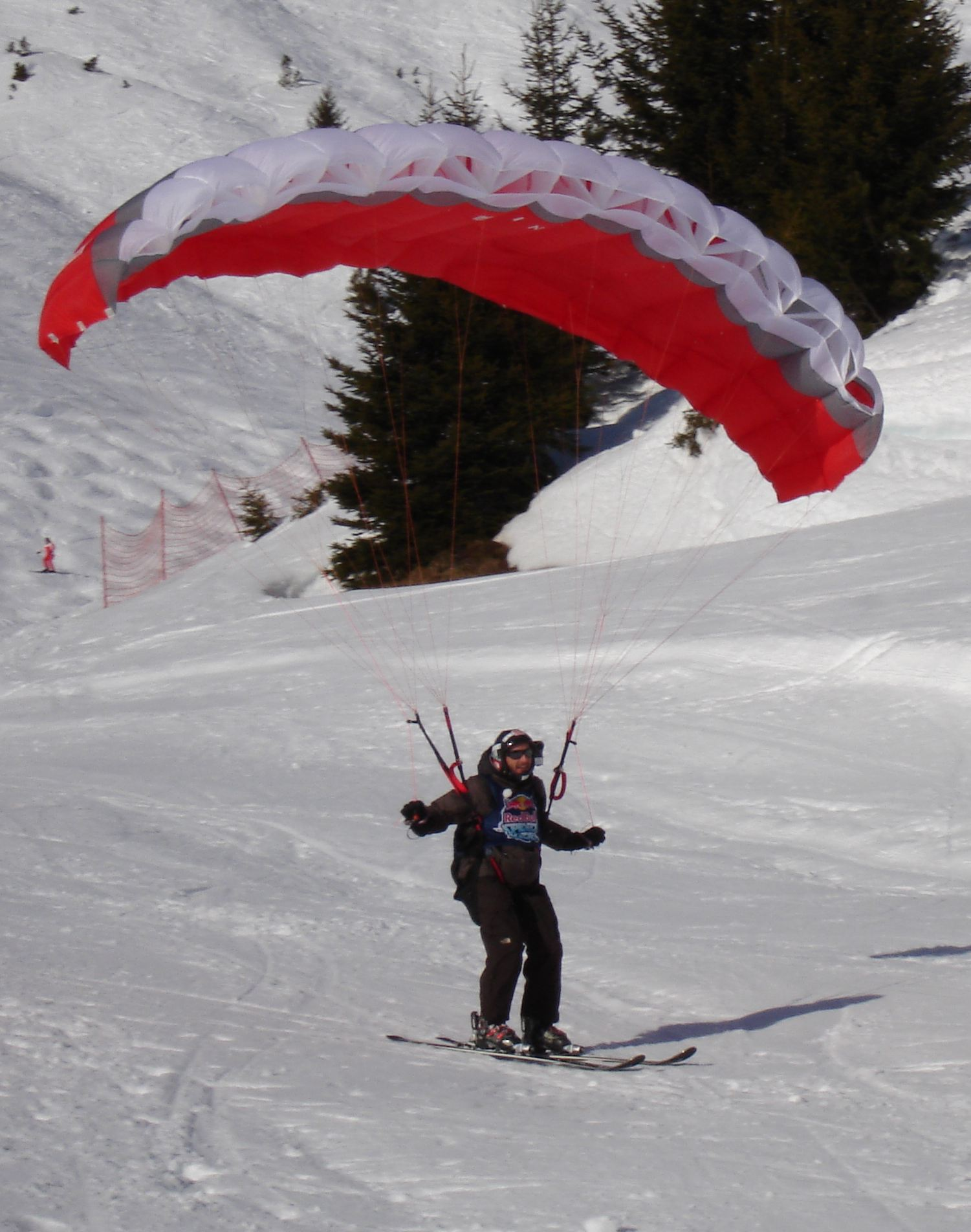
Speed wing

The wing itself is known as a speed glider, speed wing, or speed flyer. It has similar materials to paraglider canopies and to parachute lines (with a ripstop nylon fabric wing, treated with a polyurethane or silicon coating, Kevlar or Dyneema lines protected by an outer sheath, and Mylar reinforcement on the cell openings at the leading edge). However, the speed wing is only about one third to one half the size of an average paraglider (see the table below). The wing's small size and unique design give it a much smaller glide ratio making it more suitable to fly close to the slope. The smaller size also allows the wing to be flown in windier environments, and minimizes weight for hiking. The speed glider flies at speeds of 20 to 95 mph versus a paraglider's 12 to 50 mph.

It also shares characteristics with a ram-air parachute. It differs, however, because it is much lighter, more maneuverable, doesn't have a pilot chute or slider, and is not suitable for arresting free falls. The pilot can use a standing harness similar to those worn with a parachute, a strap-like sitting harness, or a protectively padded, seated harness (identical to those used with a paraglider). The speed flyer has adjustable trims on the rear riser, and sometimes the front riser. These allow the pilot to adjust the line lengths and pick the wing angle of attack best suited for the hill steepness and wind conditions.

Speed flying and speed riding require different wing characteristics because of the different glide angles and launch techniques. Speed riding pilots are able to achieve greater speeds on launch with the use of skis, and so the use of a smaller wing (typically between 7 and 10 square metres) is common, and wings tailored to this aspect of the sport typically have a steeper glide angle and long recovery arc to allow skiing on steep slopes with the wing overhead. Speed flying pilots must launch on foot, so wing sizes are typically slightly larger, although many expert speedflying pilots do routinely foot launch wings of 8 square metres or less.

Comparison of speed wings, paragliders, and parachutes
	Speed wings	Paragliders	Parachutes
Area	4.7–18 m^{2} (50–195 ft^{2})	20–35 m^{2} (215–375 ft^{2})	5.4–25 m^{2} (58–270 ft^{2})
Max. glide ratio	3:1–7:1	8:1–11:1	3:1
Speed range	30–150 km/h (20–95 mph)	20–70 km/h (12–45 mph)	25–145 km/h (15–90 mph)
Typical cruising speed	≈ 70 km/h (40 mph)	≈ 40 km/h (25 mph)	
Aspect ratio range	2.5:1–4:1	4:1–6:1	2:1–3:1
Number of risers	2–3	2–4	2
New price range ($US)	$1200–$2500	$2000–$4000	$2000–$4000
Weight	2–4 kg (4–9 lb)	4–13 kg (9–30 lb)	1.4–7 kg (3–15 lb)
Number of cells	15–30	30–80	7–9 (14 duo chamber / 27 on triple chamber)

== Safety ==
Because of the high flight speed (30–152.9 km/h or 20–95 mph), and close proximity to the slope and obstacles, injury and death are considerable risks in this sport. As of March 2024, 93 pilots had suffered fatal injuries worldwide since 2006.

Worldwide speed wing deaths per year
Incident	2006	2007	2008	2009	2010	2011	2012	2013	2014	2015	2016	2017	2018	2019	2020	2021	2022	2023	2024	Average
Deaths	2	0	2	10	6	5	7	4	7	8	5	4	3	4	7	5	9	3	2	4.89

Also, because of its small size and high wing loading, the wing responds quickly to little pilot input, a double-edged sword (almost no latency to react to unexpected dangers, but more possible consequences to untimely, brutal or unnecessary hand movement) which makes professional instruction very important. However, the high velocities help the glider remain pressurised and resistant to collapse even in turbulent conditions.

Proper equipment such as helmets, back protectors, gloves and padded harnesses can help reduce injuries, as well as reserve parachutes for high-altitude flights (preferably with a cut-away system to avoid entanglement with the main wing, as both use suspension lines of similar length). Advanced wing and off-piste ski training, as well as thorough knowledge of site conditions and hazards, are imperative to practicing this sport safely.

=== France ===
The French National Free Flight Association (FFVL) has maintained accident and fatality statistics since at least 2012, that suggest a long-term trend of speed riders suffering approximately as many fatalities (< 0.1% of active riders) and overall (≈ 0.5%) four times fewer accidents than paragliders (respectively < 0.1% and ≈ 2%) in a given year.

Eleven-year comparison of speedriding vs. paragliding accident prevalence in France (2012–2022)
Number of	2012	2013	2014	2015	2016	2017	2018	2019	2020	2021	2022
Active speedriders	2550	2995	3031	2863	2766	2874	2637	2596	2885	2177	2329
Active paragliders	24679	24687	24105	25659	24107	23274	22162	22614	23207	26328	27736
Speedriding accidents	39	20	20	18	14	11	10	16	6	3	15
Paragliding accidents	470	397	472	514	436	477	505	513	498	494	639
Speedriding fatalities	2	1	1	1	0	1	0	0	0	0	0
Paragliding fatalities	11	7	10	15	11	19	9	16	9	11	9
Speedriding accidents (% of active riders)	1.53 %	0.67 %	0.66 %	0.63 %	0.51 %	0.38 %	0.38 %	0.62 %	0.21 %	0.14 %	0.64 %
Paragliding accidents (% of active paragliders)	1.90 %	1.61 %	1.96 %	2.00 %	1.81 %	2.05 %	2.28 %	2.27 %	2.15 %	1.88 %	2.30 %
Speedriding fatalities (% of active riders)	0.08 %	0.03 %	0.03 %	0.03 %	0 %	0.03 %	0 %	0 %	0 %	0 %	0 %
Paragliding fatalities (% of active paragliders)	0.04 %	0.03 %	0.04 %	0.06 %	0.05 %	0.08 %	0.04 %	0.07 %	0.04 %	0.04 %	0.03 %

=== Switzerland ===
Out of 158 registered fatalities in foot-launched flying sports (including paragliding, hang-gliding, speedflying, and others) between 2000 and 2018, 42 took place in the canton of Berne, out of which 7 speedflyers (5 Swiss nationals and 2 foreigners), all of them in the Lauterbrunnen valley.

The Swiss Hang Gliding and Paragliding Association (SHV/FSVL) had 16798 registered members in 2018 (all disciplines combined). Overall, as of January 2024, out of about 40,200 Swiss paragliding licenses ever issued, about 1200 had the speedflying extension, and a total of 20 fatal speedflying accidents had occurred on Swiss soil.

For comparison, other long-term statistics available in Switzerland include:

- Skydiving (2000–2020): 20 fatalities;
- Paragliding (2000–2020): 155 fatalities, deemed the most accident-prone summer sport by national insurer SUVA;
- Hang-gliding (2000–2020): 16 fatalities;
- BASE jumping (1994–2019): 91 fatalities, 51 of which in the Lauterbrunnen valley, for an estimated worldwide population of 2800 BASE jumpers in 2017.

=== United States ===
The US Hang-Gliding and Paragliding Association (USHPA) has recorded a total of 9 speedflying fatalities over the ten-year period 2013–2022, as well as 51 and 32 fatalities for paragliding and hang-gliding, respectively, over the same period.

USHPA fatality reports (2013–2022)
Activity	2013	2014	2015	2016	2017	2018	2019	2020	2021	2022	Total
Speed wing	0	2	0	2	2	0	0	0	2	1	9
Paragliding	6	7	10	2	4	0	9	3	5	5	51
Hang-gliding	2	1	9	8	1	2	4	1	1	3	32
