= Empuriabrava Aerodrome =

Empuriabrava Aerodrome Aeròdrom d'Empuriabrava
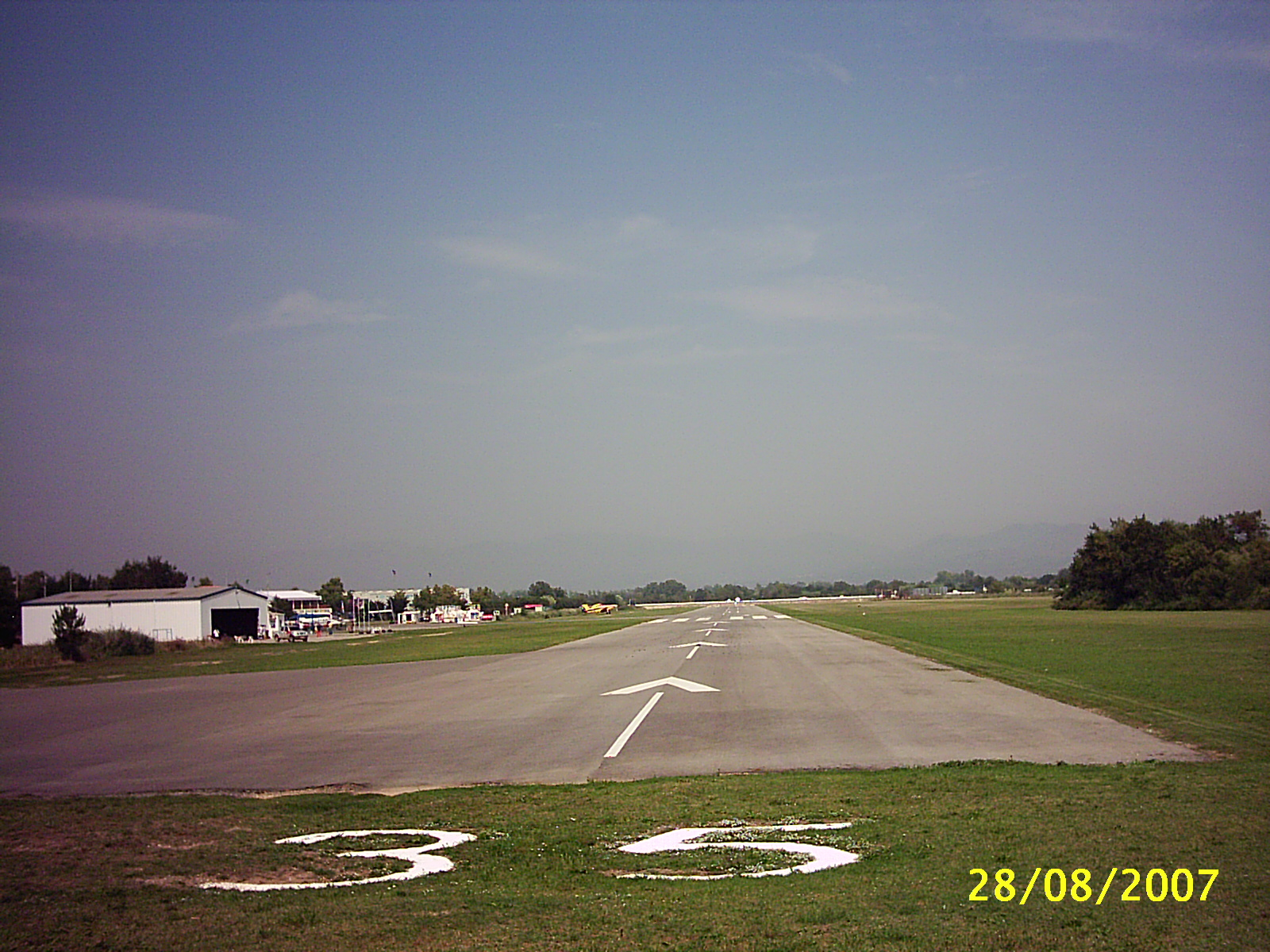
- Runway of the aerodrome Empuriabrava
- IATA: none; ICAO: LEAP

Summary
- Airport type: Private/Skydiving Sports
- Location: Empuriabrava, Castelló d'Empúries, Girona (province), Catalonia, Spain
- Coordinates: 42°15′33″N 03°06′34″E
- Interactive map of Empuriabrava Aerodrome

Runways
Direction	Length		Surface
Direction	ft	m	Surface
17/35	2,494	760	Asphalt

Empuriabrava Aerodrome (ICAO: LEAP) is a recreational aerodrome located in Empuriabrava (Alt Empordà, Girona, Catalonia, Spain), near Castelló d'Empúries at the north of the Costa Brava.

It's a private aerodrome from 1985, mainly serving parachuting by the organisation Skydive Empuriabrava.
