= Vincent Reffet =

French BASE jumper (1984–2020)

- Born: 15 September 1984; Annecy, France
- Died: 17 November 2020 (aged 36); Dubai, United Arab Emirates
- Occupations: Skydiver, BASE jumper
- Employer: Jetman Dubai

Vincent Reffet (15 September 1984 – 17 November 2020) was a French BASE jumper, skydiver, wingsuit flyer, and jetman.

== Biography ==
=== Career ===
Vincent Reffet was a professional parachutist. He completed 17,000 parachute jumps and 1,400 BASE jumps. He began wingsuit flying in 2002. He was a parachute instructor, "Jetman" pilot, licensed private pilot, wind tunnel instructor (totaling 1000 hours), and pioneer and instructor in speed riding. According to The Guardian, in 2014, Reffet "BASE jumped off the Burj Khalifa in Dubai, the world’s tallest building at 828 metres (2,717 feet), setting a world record".

He was also a pilot of the jet-powered wingsuit developed by Jetman Dubai. Some sources describe him as having been a "protégé of well-known jet daredevil Yves Rossy" who also used a "four-engine, carbon-Kevlar wing strapped to their backs". According to CNN, the "wingsuit is powered by four mini jet engines.. [and] allows pilots to control rotations around the yaw axis at zero speeds. Pilots can hover, stop, turn and maneuver, even performing rolls and loops".

In February 2020, Reffet took off from the ground in Dubai, instead of from a helicopter or from a very tall building, as for previous flights; this was the first time that a ground ascent was achieved. The capability was made possible with a new "computerized stabilization system that allowed for hovering flight". The wingsuit was said to be able to reach an altitude of 6,000 feet and Reffet's top speed was estimated at 150 miles per hour. In order to land safely, he used a parachute. Prior to his death, Reffet made this statement to the news media about the benefits of the jetpack: "... when I am skydiving, I have like this feeling of freedom like I can pretty much go where I want, but always going down. [But] with this machine I can fly like a bird".

=== Awards ===
In 2004, Reffet won the French free-fly championship in Vannes and the world free-fly championship in Boituva, Brazil, teamed with fellow Frenchman Fred Fugen.

The "Soul Flyers" free-fly team of Reffet and Fred Fugen:

- won the 2005 World Games in Duisburg, Germany, and the 2005 World Cup in Eloy, Arizona, United States;
- won the 2006 World Championship in Gera, Germany;
- won the 2008 World Championship in Maubeuge, France.

In 2009, Reffet and Fugen won the free-fly World Games in Kaohsiung, Taiwan.

On 21 April 2014, Reffet and Fugen broke the Guinness World Record for highest BASE jump from a building, jumping 828 metres (2,717 ft) from the Burj Khalifa in Dubai, United Arab Emirates. Reffet and Fugen conducted the jump with permission from the authorities and support from several sponsors. The two men jumped from a specially designed ramp constructed at the top of the building.

On 13 October 2015, Reffet and Yves Rossy flew in formation with an Emirates Airbus A380 over Dubai.

=== Death ===
On 17 November 2020, Reffet died in a training accident in Dubai. The accident occurred during a jet powered wingsuit flight. Reffet became inverted in flight at a low altitude with his 4 engine jet in Dubai, United Arab Emirates. He was not able to right his pack and did not open his parachute. He was killed hitting the ground at high speed.
