= Skydive Empuriabrava =

Parachuting in Spain

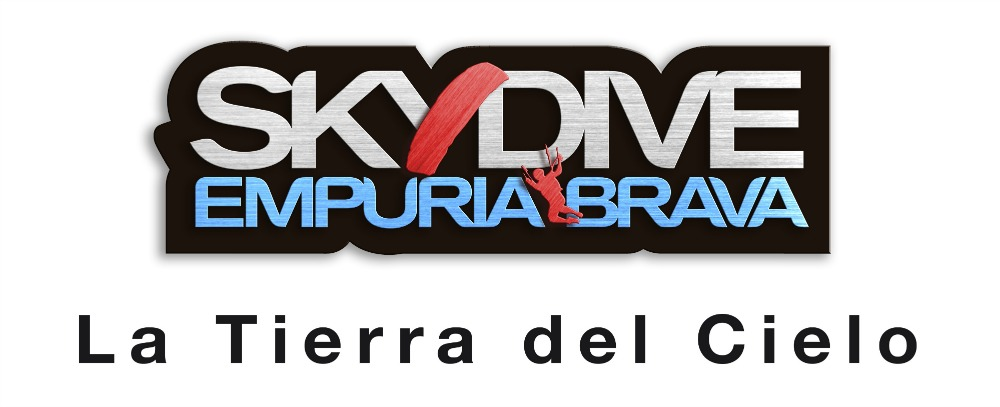
- Industry: Privately sports, services at all levels of skydiving
- Founded: Castelló d'Empúries, Girona, Catalonia, Spain
- Founder: Roland Hilfiker; Maria Peterson; Mitch Decoteau
- Number of locations: 1 (2014)
- Key people: Reinier Bos (CEO); Juli Sargatal (IT, Marketing and Sales Manager); Alberto Cardosa (Financial Manager); Richard Pym (Operations Manager)
- Services: Tandem skydiving; introductory and advanced courses; formation flying; freefly; wingsuit; formation flying; training for professionals; training teams for competition
- Operating income: ▲€4.08 million (2006); €3.35 million (2005)
- Number of employees: ▲50 (2014); 40 (2005); 5 (1985)
- Website: skydiveempuriabrava.com

Skydive Empuriabrava is a skydiving center, operating at the Empuriabrava Aerodrome (in Empuriabrava, Castelló d'Empúries, Costa Brava, Girona province, Catalonia, Spain) since 1985. Throughout its history, Skydive Empuriabrava has also offered photography flights, pleasure flights, and an aviation school for private pilots.

== History ==
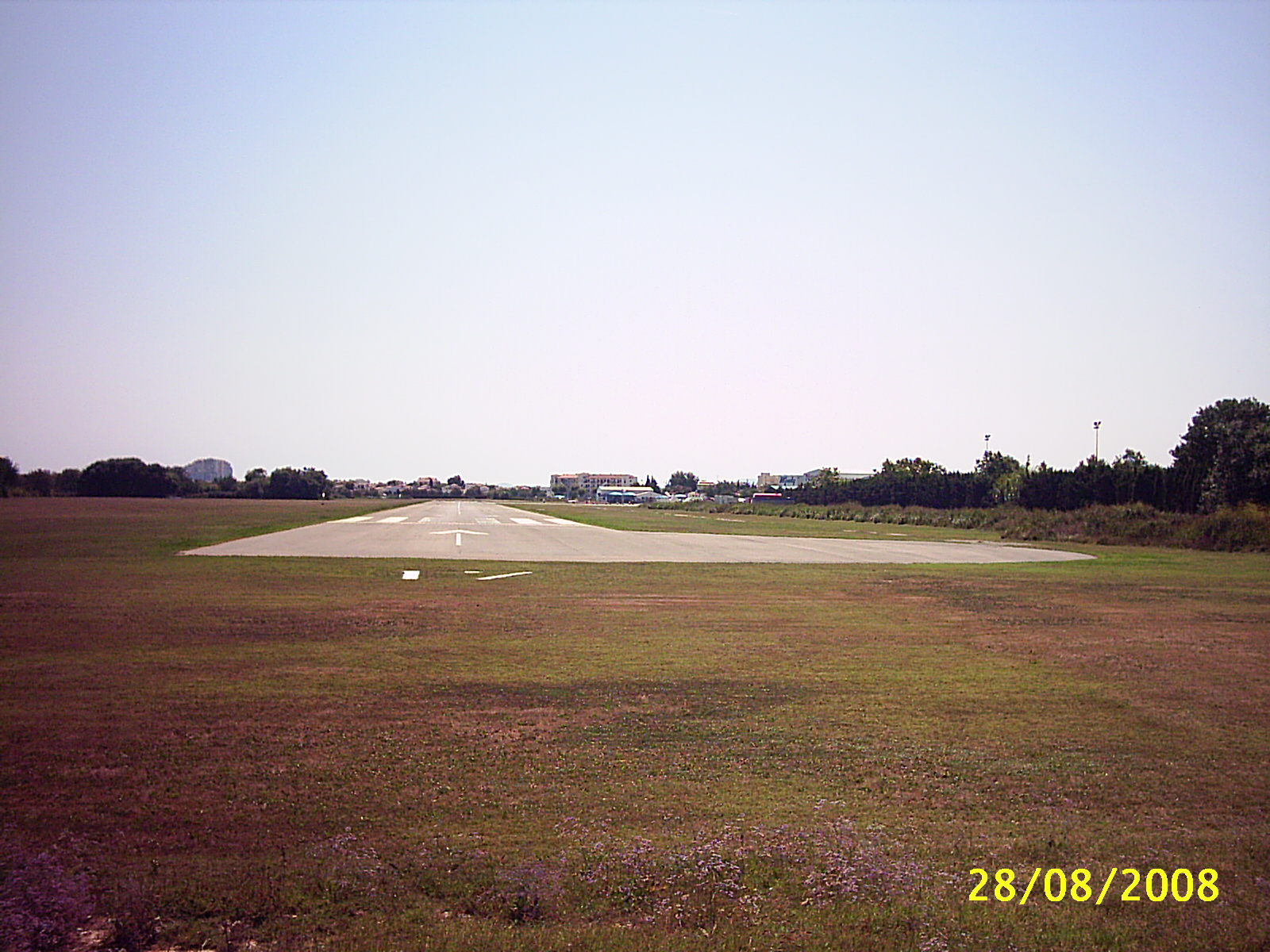
Runway 17

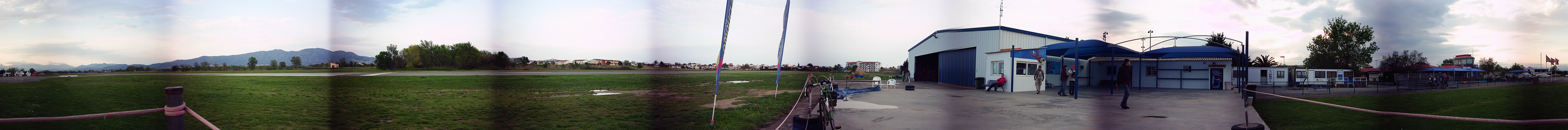
Panoramic view of the aerodrome

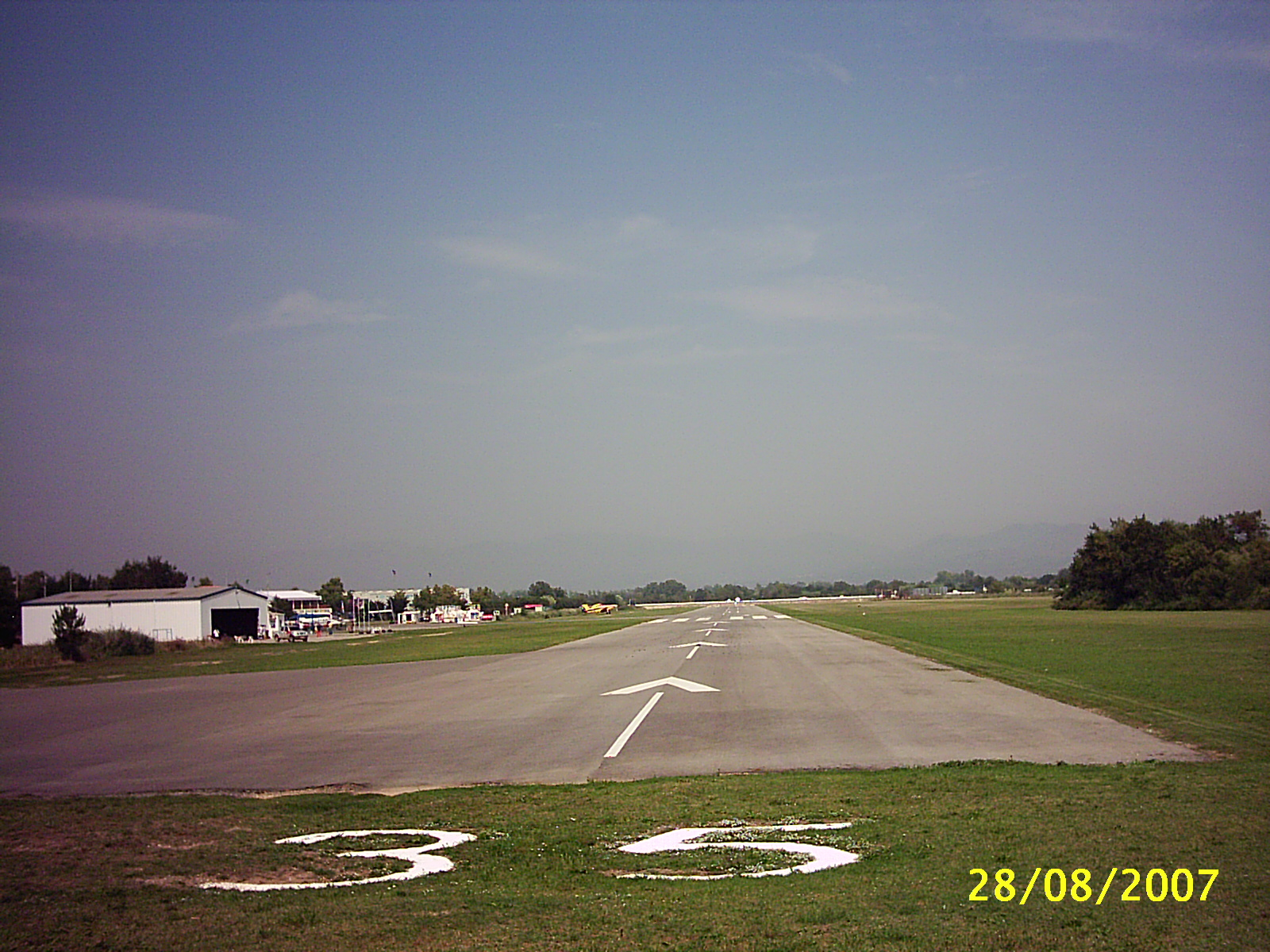
Empuriabrava Aerodrome, runway 35

Founded in 1973, the Empuriabrava Aerodrome was managed by the ParaClub Girona section of Aeroclub Girona. In 1975, the club was bought by Promotora Deportiva del Ampurdán. The club was then bought in 1984 by Anglo Costa Brava de Inversiones. This company leased the facilities Centro de Paracaidismo Costa Brava, a professional skydiving management firm. The business changed its name of the Aerodrome, Centro de Paracaidismo Costa Brava, to Skydive Empuriabrava in 1985.

In 1987, Anglo Costa Brava de Inversiones sold the concern to the company Fórmula y Propiedades S.L.

Centro de Paracaidismo Costa Brava, the company in charge of the skydiving operations and tenant of Anglo Costa Brava de Inversiones, continued with the same lease arrangement for the facilities.

Centro de Paracaidismo Costa Brava was founded in 1984 by the Italian-American Maria-Grazia Panozzo, Swiss Roland Hilfiker, and American Mitch Decoteau. The founders introduced AFF (Accelerated freefall), developed by the "School of Human Flight", to the aerodrome. This training method shifted from the traditional static-line progression system to starting students with 12,500 ft jumps guided by professional instructors giving in-air signals to allow people to practice their positioning at terminal velocity. This method proved highly effective and is now the standard taught worldwide. In 1986, Jaume Comas Espigulé joined the company.

In 1985, there were five people employed by the company, which did not own any light aircraft: a Cesna 207, first used at Girona airport, was rented. The first Pilatus EC-EMZ was not bought until 1987, two years later.

The period from 1985 to 1994 saw the first milestones on a European scale. Jumps at Empuriabrava aerodrome rose from 12,000 to 35,000 a year. By 1985 it was one of the few aviation centres open continuously throughout the year. The Christmas Boogie, an international event for skydivers who meet to take part in unusual competitions and group jumps, attracted 1,000 registered participants in 1987 and had to be moved to Girona Airport so that aircraft such as the DC-3 and the Caribou could be used. Freefall and precision landing jumps were performed and in 1992, with the arrival of the Olympic flame for the Barcelona Olympic Games, a demonstration free fall jump featured a representation of the five Olympic rings.

The aerodrome changed hands again: in 1994, Peter Jones, Ivan Coufal and Jaime Comas Espigulé bought Centro de Paracaidismo Costa Brava and jumps at the aerodrome rose to 134,000 per year, making it the aerodrome with the highest number of jumps in the world. The meetings and exhibitions that had been staged for years became increasingly consolidated benchmarks on the world skydiving calendar. The mild winter temperatures of the Empordà region turned the Boogie Christmas meeting into Europe's largest event and required a much larger fleet of aircraft to cater for the 12,000 jumps. The Speed Star competition, which involves ten skydivers from the same team forming a star formation as fast as possible in the air, became a characteristic feature of the event. This was also a period of records, and the site became home to the Spanish Formation Skydiving team and the French Freefly World Champion team. It also offered the highly spectacular discipline of wingsuit flying. In order to rationalise the business situation after all the aerodrome's changes of ownership over the years, in 2005, Skydive Empuriabrava acquired Fórmula y Propiedades SL, which it owned until 2012 when the company was bought by a sovereign wealth fund from Dubai through the company Skydive Dutch BV. From that time onwards, investments were made in the facilities with a view to making it a key centre for skydiving lovers. It has now been the centre with the highest number of jumps in Europe since 1998.

=== Timeline ===
- 1985: Opening as a professional skydiving centre with a staff of 5 people. In the first year of operations alone, 25,000 jumps were made, thus making it Europe's leading aerodrome for number of jumps per year.
- 2001: the 134,000 jumps per year mark was reached. It became one of the world's top three skydiving centres.
- 2003: with 1,000,000 jumps made from the facilities since 1985, it became the world's first skydiving centre to reach this mark. The Generalitat of Catalonia used the occasion of the millionth jump to award Castelló d'Empúries the status of Sports Tourism Destination (DTE) for skydiving. It now had 40 staff and a number of associated satellite companies.
- 2013: 2,000,000 jumps made since it opened, with a yearly average of 100,000 jumps.

=== Facilities ===
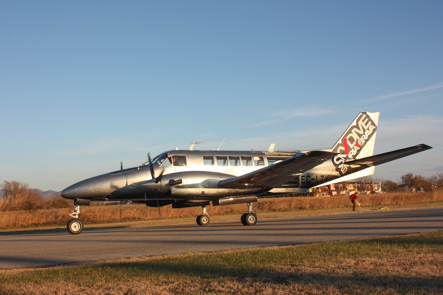
Beechcraft 99

In addition to the hangars, packing zone, private team rooms and onsite gas station, it has Pilatus Porter aircraft and De Havilland Twin Otter. The facilities also include offices and a restaurant.

== Services ==
Skydive Empuriabraba offers tandem skydiving, beginner's flights and aerial photography work. The school offers formation skydiving courses for beginners and advanced students, freefly canopy, wingsuit flying (or wing-suiting), formation skydiving for top competition, training for top competition, and flight instruction for professionals.

== Competitions ==
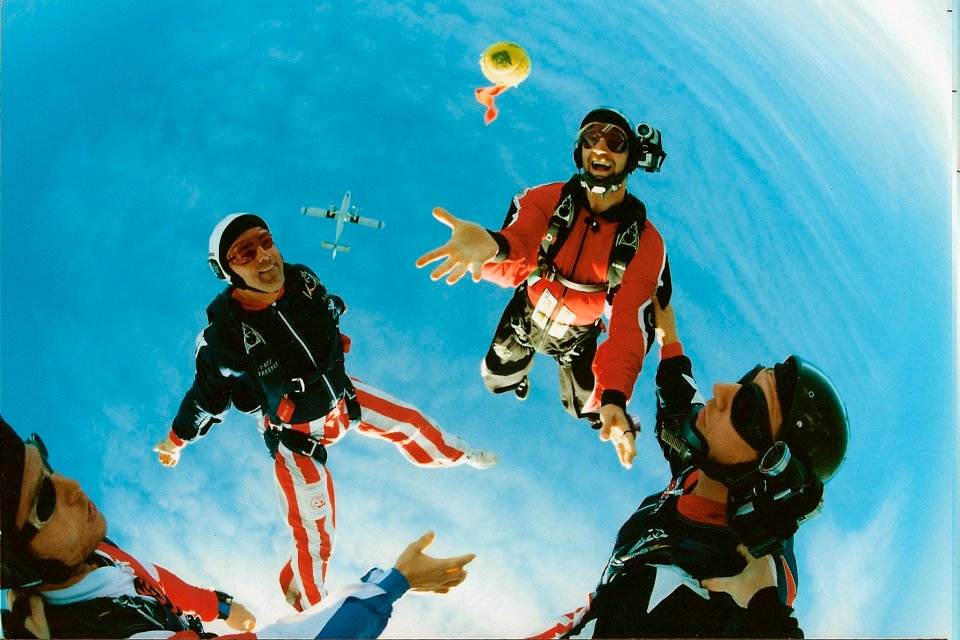
Olav Zipser Space Ball and Space Games

Skydive Empuriabrava has hosted top world sports events. The centre organised the eighth World Formation Skydiving Championship (1989), two World Cups (1994 and 2002) and the fourth World Freestyle and Skysurfing Championship (1993). The 1993 Championship was attended by Patrick de Gayardon (inventor of skysurf and modern wingsuit flying), Olav Zipser (considered the father of the freefly discipline), Mike Michigan (freestyle pioneer) and Marco Manna, considered the all-time best freestyler.

It also hosted the ninth Formation Skydiving World Cup (1994), the third POPS World Championship (1995), an Extreme Games (1996), the first Spanish Freestyle and Skysurfing Championship (1997), the first European 16-Way Formation Skydiving Championship (1998), the first 16-Way Formation Skydiving World Cup (1998), the twenty-fourth Spanish Skydiving Championship (2002), the thirteenth Skydiving World Cup (2002) and the twenty-fifth Spanish Skydiving Championship (2003).

From 2004 to 2006, it also hosted the King of Swoop competitions (initially known as the Beach Swoop Challenge), a skydiving contest that brings together specialists in swooping, a landing technique based on speed, distance and precision. This competition has been reinitiated in 2014.

Since 1989, and particularly since 1993, it has been the venue for Spanish, European and world competitions in different skydiving disciplines, notably freestyle, POPS, extreme games, swoop, skysurfing, freefly and canopy formation skydiving.

=== Records set at the facilities ===
The following records have been set at the facilities:

- 2004 Women's European Canopy Formation record
- 2005 Spanish Canopy Formation Skydiving record, with 25 skydivers
- 2005 European Freefly record, with 28 skydivers
- 2007 European Freefly record, with 40 skydivers
- 2009 European Freefly record, with 51 skydivers
- 2011 European Freefly record, with 80 skydivers
- 2012 World Horizontal Freefall Speed record, reaching the 304-km/h mark.
- On 5 October 2012, the Swiss Marc Hauser set a first world record in speed tracking, a discipline he founded. The measured ground speed was 188.9 mph (304 km/h) over the dropzone of Skydive Empuriabrava, Spain. Only a specially adapted skydiving suit was used (no wingsuit, tracking suit, nor additional weights were used).
- 2013 European Freefly Record, with 96 skydivers
- 2013 World Sequential Formation Skydiving record, with 106 skydivers
- 2014 Guinness Record, tandem jumping to get 35 jumps in one hour when the record was in 28.
- 2015 European Freefly Head Up, with 21 skydivers

=== Participation in world records ===
In order to promote the sport, the aerodrome supports highly ambitious sportspeople involved in official competitions or in setting world records. It has also been the training site for the Spanish National Skydiving Team and for other national teams that trained here prior to becoming world champions. Examples are the Swiss, the English women's team, the Belgian and the Russian teams, and the French team that was World Champion in 2003. This team included the French Babylon Freefly team, still currently considered the world leader as well as an organiser of top events and jumps, the school of which has run training at Empuriabrava since 2003. Skydive Empuriabrava has also been the training site for members of the "Wings Project" since it began, and later for different challenges such as the 15-km Strait of Gibraltar jump record in 2005.

The Empuriabrava Skydive team takes part in skydiving demonstrations worldwide and has achieved the following records:

- 1999 largest free fall World Record, Ubon Ratchathani (Thailand), 282 skydivers.
- 2003 largest free fall World Record: 13 December 2003, Eloy (Arizona), 300 skydivers
- 2004 largest free fall World Record: 6 February 2004, Korat (Thailand), 357 skydivers from around the world established a free fall formation at 280 km/h, which remained intact for exactly 6 seconds at a height of 24,000 feet (7,315 metres). The challenge, held to mark the 72nd birthday of the Queen of Thailand, brought together the world's best jumpers on a historic occasion. Three skydivers from the Empuriabrava-Red Bull team (Santi Corella, Félix Álvarez and Toni López), plus Alain Dony, took part at the event.
- 2005 canopy formation World Record: Lake Wales (Florida), 85 skydivers. The head of the canopy formation flying school, Alain Dony, took part.
- 2006 free fall formation World Record: February, also in Thailand. This time 400 skydivers from around the world established a freefall formation that stayed intact for 4.25 seconds.

=== Wings Project ===
After a project in Norway, in 1999 members of the aerodrome team Santiago Corella and Toni López, together with high-risk sportsman Álvaro Bultó, came up with what was known as the "Wings Project" ("Proyecto Alas"), a professional skydiving and BASE jumping team whose objective was to tackle four challenges and overcome natural elements in special conditions such as relief, temperature (extreme heat or cold) or lack of oxygen, and skydive freefall with wingsuits. The initiative and training originated at Skydive Empuriabrava. While rising to these challenges, they twice beat the world record for human freefall flight, which they themselves had set.

== Awards ==
The constant flow of skydivers and accompanying parties and seasonal continuity has established a regularity that has earned Skydive Empuriabrava the "Espiga i Timó" Award of the Council of Castelló d'Empúries, the 22nd Tourism Night Award from the Girona School of Tourism, and the Association of Tourist Apartments "Sun of the Costa Brava" Award.

In 2003, the Generalitat of Catalonia used the occasion of the millionth jump to award Castelló d'Empúries the status of Sports Tourism Destination (DTE) for skydiving, in acknowledgement of the facilities.

In 2010, the Generalitat of Catalonia recognised its outstanding contribution to tourism in Catalonia by awarding it the Tourism Diploma of Catalonia.

== Exhibitions and collaborative projects ==
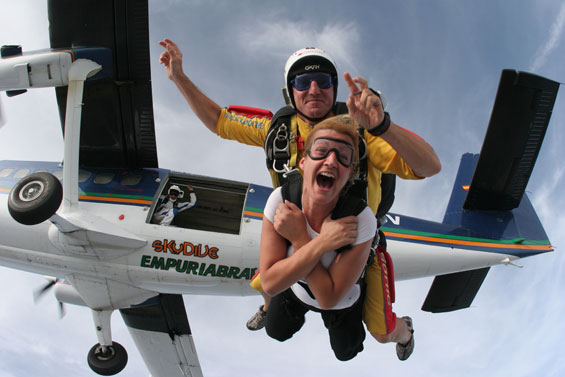
Tandem Skydive

- Participation in reception of the Olympic flame at Empúries for the 1992 Barcelona Olympic Games with a demonstration freefall jump featuring a representation of the five Olympic rings.
- Participation in the opening of the 1992 Barcelona Olympic Games at Barcelona's Montjuïc Olympic Stadium (1992).
- January 1997, a jump to show solidarity with ETA kidnap victims, José Antonio Ortega and Cosme Delclaux.
- Spanish Formula 1 Grand Prix.
- Formation of a black ribbon in free fall to show solidarity with the victims of the terrorist attacks of 11 March in Madrid (11 April 2004).
- Collaboration with Dalí Year on 8 October 2004, with a free fall representation of Dalí's painting Christ of Saint John of the Cross.
- Collaboration in several editions of Channel TV3's fundraising "Marató".
- Since 2005, it has worked with the Children's Dream Foundation to make the dream of children with cancer and other serious illnesses a reality.
- The music video for The Presets single "Fall" was filmed at the center circa 2013, with Airwax Freefly Team members Karine Joly and Gregory Crozier doubling for Julian Hamilton and Kim Moyes respectively.

== Book of honour ==
Skydive Empuriabrava’s history of hosting European and world competitions, the range of activities available at the facilities, and its location on the Costa Brava have attracted athletes and public figures from various fields.

Athletes from multiple disciplines have skydived in Empuriabrava, including tennis players Juan Carlos Ferrero and Sergi Bruguera; motorcyclists Adam Raga, Àlex Crivillé and Sete Gibernau; racing driver Marc Gené, world motorcycling champion Valentino Rossi, Formula 1 champion Michael Schumacher, taekwondo expert Joel González, swimmer Clara Basiana and sports-adventurer Álvaro Bultó, have jumped here. One publicly noted event is the first parachute jump of Marta Ferrusola, wife of former President of the Generalitat of Catalonia, Jordi Pujol, who made her first parachute jump.

The facilities have also served as a filming location for movies and music videos. Fatboy Slim's "Bird of Prey" music video (2000) was filmed there, as were exteriors skydiving scenes for the French production Secret Agents (2004), starring Monica Bellucci and Vincent Cassel. In 2011, the site was used for exterior skydiving scenes in the Bollywood movie Zindagi Na Milegi Dobara (You only live once).
