= Drop zone =

Designated site for manned or unmanned parachute landings

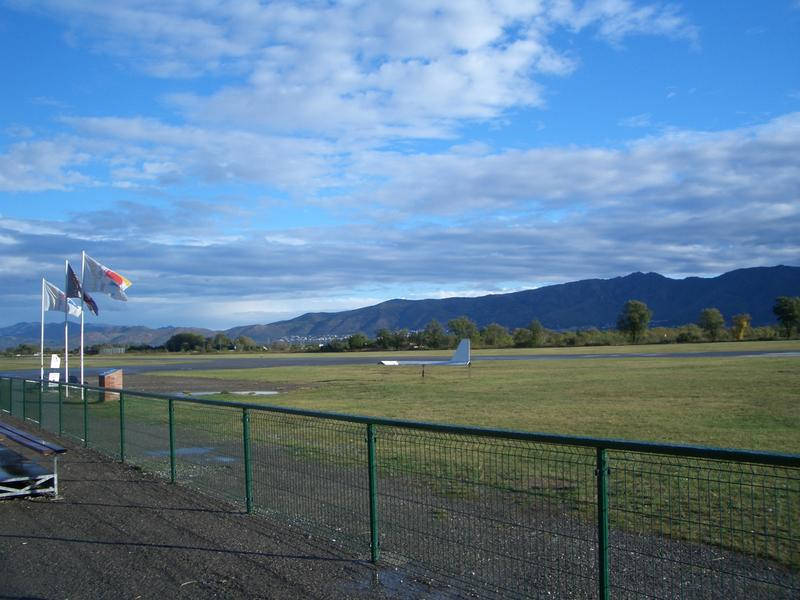
Drop zone in Skydive Empuriabrava, Catalonia, Spain

A drop zone (DZ) is a place where parachutists or parachuted supplies land. It can be an area targeted for landing by paratroopers and airborne forces, or a base from which recreational parachutists and skydivers take off in aircraft and land under parachutes. In the latter case, it is often beside a small airport, frequently sharing the facility with other general aviation.

At recreational drop zones, an area is generally set side for parachute landings. Personnel at the site may include a drop zone operator or owner (DZO), manifestors (who maintain the flight manifest documents defining who flies and when), pilots, instructors or coaches, camera operators, parachute packers and riggers, and other general staff.

== History ==
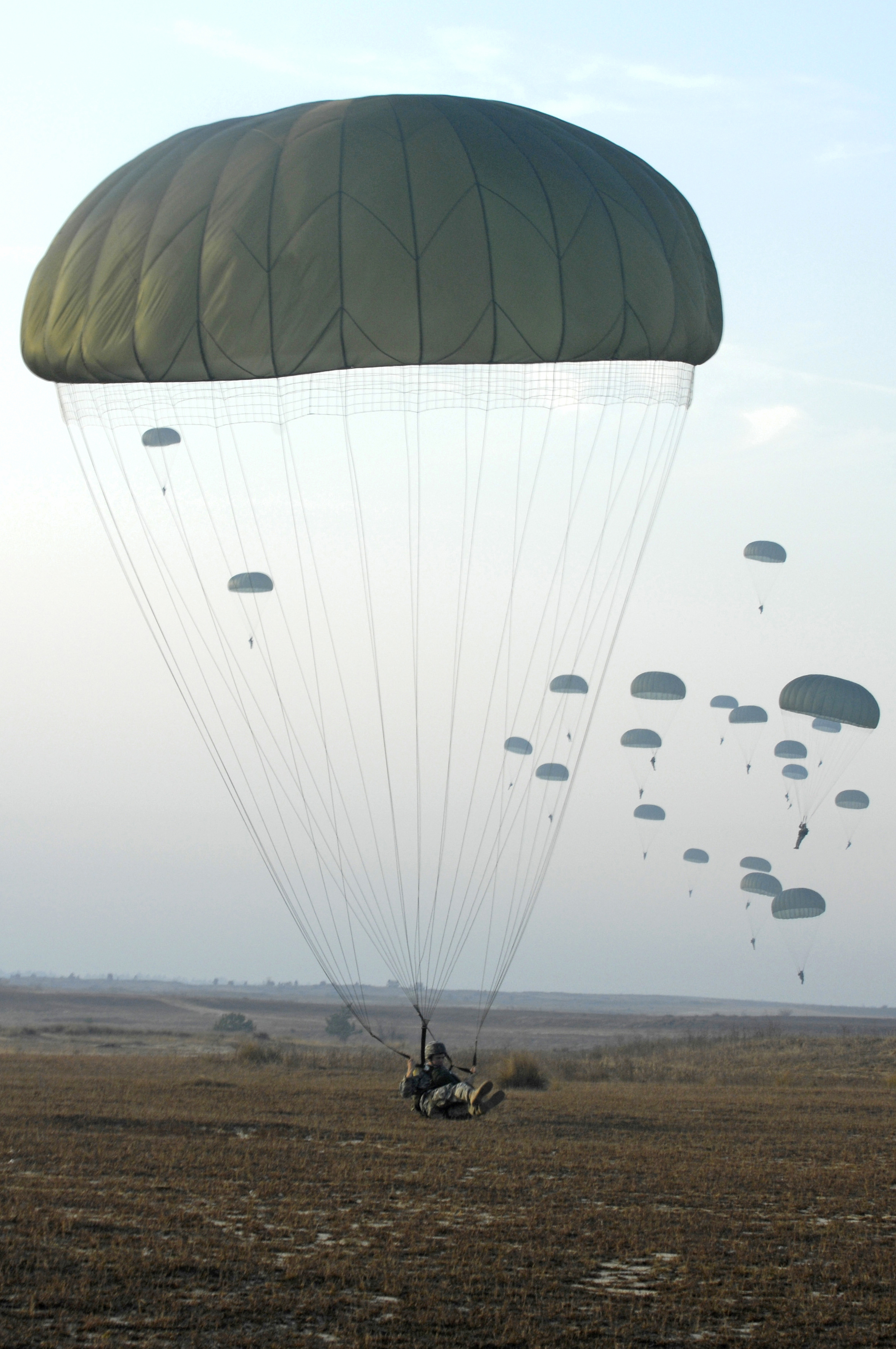
U.S. Army paratroopers with the 82nd Airborne Division parachute from a C-130 Hercules aircraft during Operation Toy Drop 2007 at Pope Air Force Base

The concept of a drop zone became relevant alongside the emerging relevance of parachuting, which had only begun taking place in the late eighteenth century. The first parachuting jump from an aircraft occurred in 1797 when André-Jacques Garnerin descended above Paris landing in Parc Monceau, making it the very first appointed drop zone. More specifically, the area where Garnerin landed is said to have been surrounded by a crowd, which means that the boundaries of the drop zone at Parc Monceau are marked by the surrounding crowd. After Garnerin’s jump, the idea of parachute jumping was abandoned due to the impractical nature of parachute design, until the idea became more popular with the increasing demands from entertainment-seeking public and the military. The beginning of World War I had made significant contribution to the development of parachuting due to the high demands from the military which influenced the increasing production and technological development of parachute design.

Furthermore, the developments in aircraft design made the application of parachuting more feasible by improving the ease of personnel transportation allowing for the implementation of paratroopers – military parachutists. Paratroopers would conduct surprise attacks and seize military objectives, which meant that paratroopers were assigned or would choose drop zones that were less predictable and more extreme than what would usually be accepted by recreational parachutists. For example, during the Battle of Crete in 1941, the Germans deployed many paratroopers to seize Allied territory by establishing an airhead (a kind of drop zone which is used to receive allied reinforcements while defended in a threatened territory), which proved to the Allies the effectiveness of military parachuting. Post-World War II, parachuting continued to see development in military and recreational directions which led to the broadening of the definition of a drop zone now allowing for any place for skydiving to be called a drop zone (DZ).

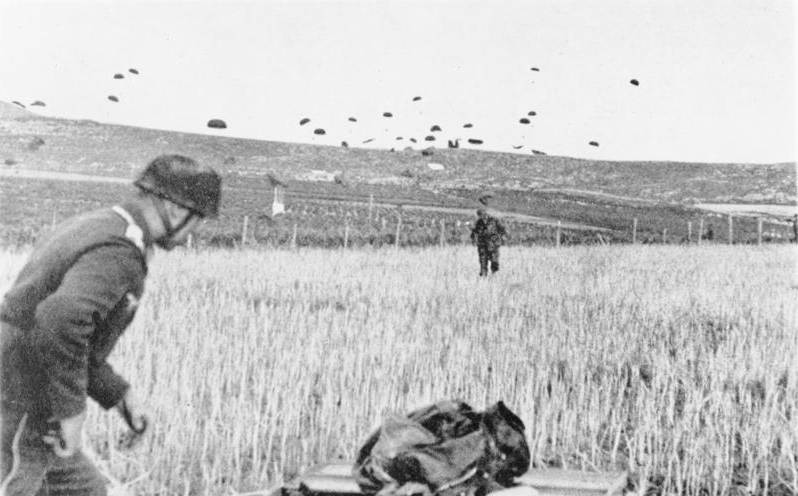
German paratroopers (Fallschirmjäger) landing on Crete, May 1941

== Military drop zone ==
In the military context a drop zone is any designated area where personnel and or equipment may be delivered by parachute or, in the case of certain items, by free drop. The specific parameters for DZ’s may vary between militaries. For example, NATO’s STANAG normative regulation for drop zone operation and engagement differs from the parameters set out by the United States Marine Corps.

STANAG, 1993 Drop Zone chapter considers a range of factors involved in appropriate drop engagement. Firstly, the airspeed of engagement over the drop zone is used to estimate the time to the landing at the drop zone. Drop altitude is another measurable variable which is calculated between the aircraft and the ground, taking into consideration the personnel, container delivery as well as the weight of the equipment delivered. The time between jumps is also considered which depends on the number of jumpers. Then, the methods of delivery are provided; there are usually three methods: low velocity to decrease airspeed most for sensitive equipment and personnel, high velocity for supplies and free drop. DZ obstacles include trees, water, powerlines or other conditions that may injure parachutists or damage equipment. Access to and size of DZ are calculated with regards to the obstacles and the number of jumpers; for example, one jumper the size of DZ should be at least 550m by 550m. Another important variable which determines the effectiveness of a DZ is the support team (DZST) servicing it. STANAG regulation suggests that there should be at least two trained members of personnel servicing a DZ. Primary missions of the DZST include wartime CDS drops to battalion or smaller size units, and peacetime visual meteorological conditions drops involving one to three aircraft for personnel, CDS, and heavy equipment. Another important function of DZST is to be familiar and mark the DZ appropriately for the incoming aircraft as well as being able to communicate the dangers or other conditions that surround the DZ (Jumpmaster Study Guide Supplemental Materials, 2020).

The technical element of DZ planning is well justified by the prevailing factors that cause injury during “combat jumping” up to this day. In 1945 airborne assault casualty rates from parachuting itself were around 6%, now persisting at around 3%. The factors causing the injuries are often related to communication with DZST and inappropriate injury assessments. Often the failure to communicate the cancelation of the mission, or no-go weather conditions are the reasons for chaotic and damaging combat jumps. On the other hand, the vast range of factors that constitute a safe drop zone is often unmet due to the extreme and unpredictable nature of military drop zones, which inevitably causes injuries. It was found that injury assessment during combat jumps is often overexaggerated and mission ineffective, making the importance of appropriate drop zone arrangement and support even more valid.

== Recreational drop zone ==
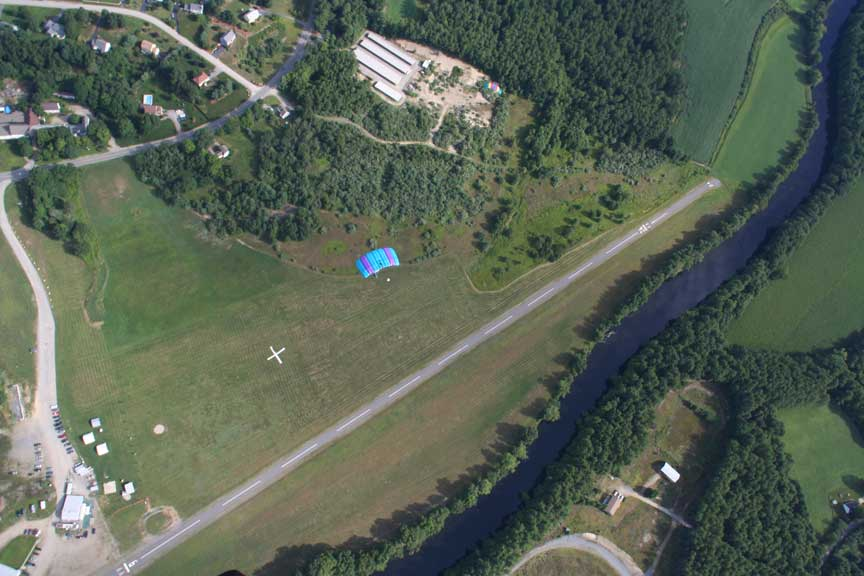
Drop zone in Pepperell, MA (USA), seen from the air

The earliest recreational parachuting jumps were made from balloons, and the first successful parachute descent was performed in 1797 over Paris. Free-falling jumps were not possible until 1908 Contests began in the US in 1926, and the first world championship was held in Yugoslavia in 1951. Competitors normally used aircraft to carry them to about 3600 m, and parachutes are usually opened at about 760 m. In skydiving parachutists compete in 4 world championship areas: free-fall individual style manoeuvres, combined with precision accuracy landing; 4 and 8-person group free-fall, with recreational jumping in groups of 2 to 100; open parachute formations and para-ski.

Skydiving in sport is practiced at a drop zone, a facility with authorization for parachute jumps. In some instances, first aid may be available at the DZ, but one study noted that injuries sustained only amounted to around 0.2% of all the skydives. Furthermore, the modern framework for skydiving drop zones is established in the official policy documents such as Parachute Descents Authorisation and Specification 2020, which defines DZs clearly in the civilian context.

In addition to regular jumps, many skydivers attend events called “boogies.” Boogies are special events hosted by one DZ to draw jumpers from surrounding DZs for jumping and partying. So, the purpose of a DZ is not only to facilitate recreational parachuting but also to bring people together in a community.
