= Empuriabrava =

Community in Castelló d'Empúries, Girona, Catalonia, Spain

Coordinates: 42°15′N 3°07′E

- Community
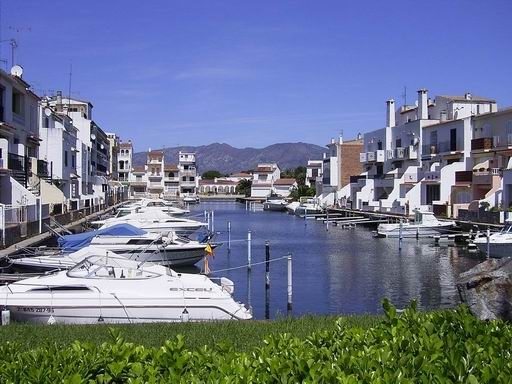
- Empuriabrava, residential marina

- Location within Spain Location within Catalonia
- Country: Spain
- Autonomous community: Catalonia
- Province: Girona
- Comarca: Alt Empordà
- Municipality: Castelló d'Empúries
- Elevation: 17 m (56 ft)

Population (2019)
  - Total: 6,915
- Website: www.castellodempuries.org

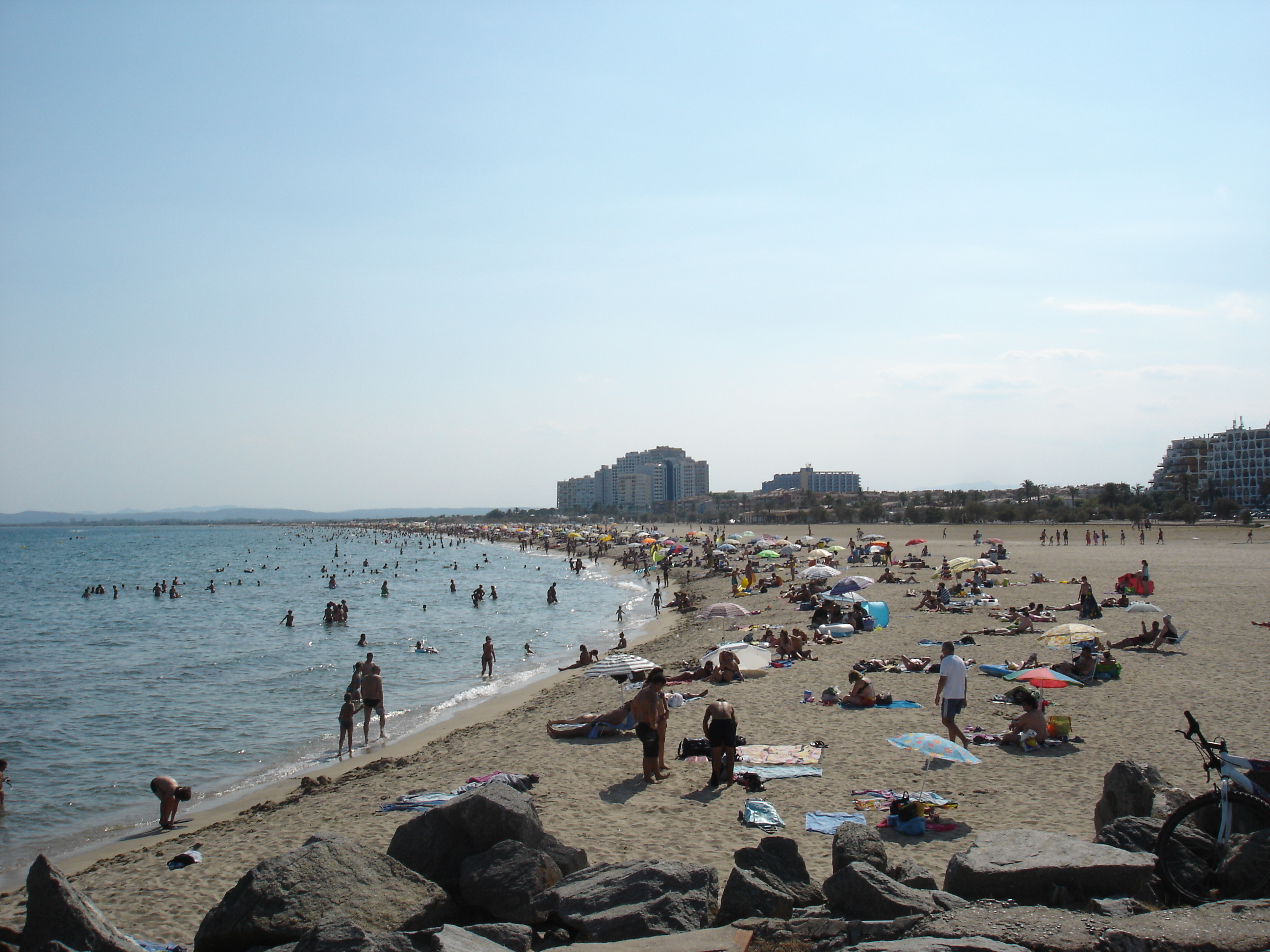
Empuriabrava's wide sand beach

Footage of Empuriabrava's commercial arcade walkway

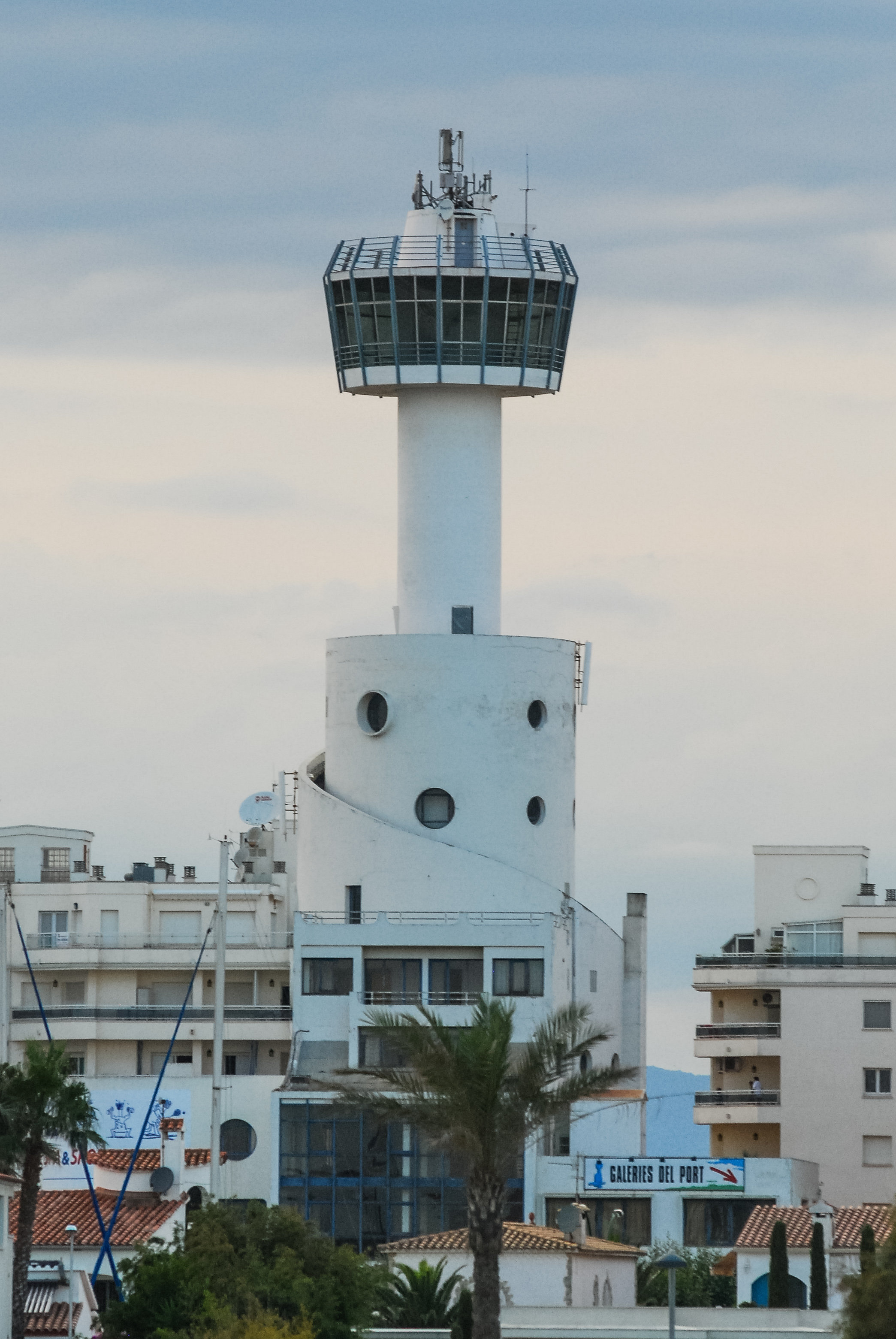
The Torre panoràmica

Empuriabrava (Spanish: Ampuriabrava) is a community in the municipality of Castelló d'Empúries, in the Alt Empordà (Costa Brava, province of Girona, Catalonia, Spain). It is located in the Gulf of Roses, surrounded by the Natural Park of the Aiguamolls de l'Empordà, and is the largest residential marina in Europe, with some 24 km of navigable waterways.

Originally built on a swamp, Empuriabrava was transformed into a tourist community, initially planned in 1964 and completed in 1975. The town has more than 40 km of canals and a seasonal, summer population of around 80,000. The Greco-Roman acropolis of Sant Martí d'Empúries is nearby.

Its aerodrome (ICAO-code LEAP), immediately to the north of the town, offers a variety of air sports with services for all levels of skydiving.

== Transport and communications ==
=== Roads ===
Empuriabrava can be accessed by motorway AP-7 or state road N-II, then via state road C-260, taking the Figueres-Roses exit in the direction Roses.

=== Bus ===
- Bus from Barcelona: Barcelona-Castelló d'Empúries-Empuriabrava.
- Bus from Girona: Girona-Castelló d'Empúries-Empuriabrava.
- Bus from Girona Airport: Aeroport de Girona-Empuriabrava (summer only).
- Bus from Barcelona Airport: Bus Barcelona Airport - Figueres and after bus Figueres - Castelló d’Empúries - Empuriabrava

=== Train ===
The nearest Renfe railway station is in Figueres, 15 km from the municipality. From there, there is a bus towards Castelló d'Empúries and Empuriabrava.

AVE and TGV trains arrive at the Figueres-Vilafant railway station. From there, there are buses to the principal bus station in Figueres, from which there are buses to Castelló d'Empúries and Empuriabrava.

=== Airports ===
- Girona Airport: The nearest airport is Girona-Costa Brava, an important base for Ryanair. During the summer season, a bus to the town is available.

Additionally, the major international airport at Barcelona-El Prat is located 160 km to the south, around two hours by car.

- Empuriabrava Aerodrome: In Empuriabrava there is also an aerodrome, Skydive Empuriabrava.

=== Boat ===
- Port of Empuriabrava: 42° 14′ Latitude N – 3° 08′ Length E, accommodating 5,000 moorings for boats of up to 26 metres (85 ft) in length.
