= Wingsuit flying =

Free-fall flight using a wingsuit

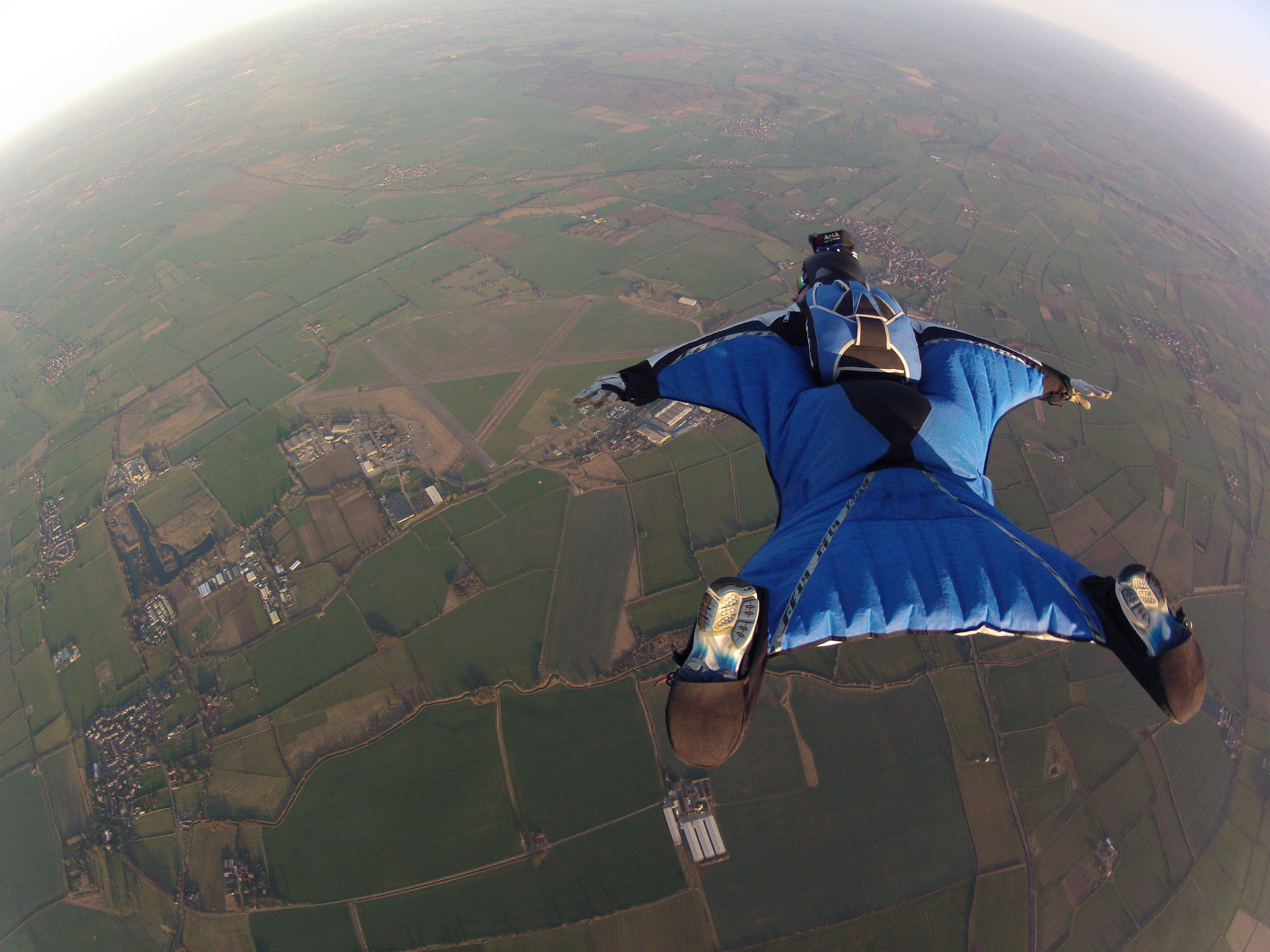
A wingsuit pilot flying over fields in the United Kingdom

Wingsuit flying, also called wingsuiting, is flight in free fall using a specialized suit with fabric wings between the arms and torso and between the legs. The added surface area reduces vertical speed and increases horizontal speed, producing a controllable glide while restricting part of the jumper's normal range of motion.

A wingsuit flight may begin from an aircraft or from a fixed BASE object and normally ends with parachute deployment. Aircraft and fixed-object flights use different exit procedures, equipment and training.

The Fédération Aéronautique Internationale (FAI) recognizes wingsuit performance flying and acrobatic flying as international competition disciplines. Performance flying measures time, horizontal distance and horizontal speed, while acrobatic teams perform compulsory and free routines for judging from a camera flyer's footage.

== History ==
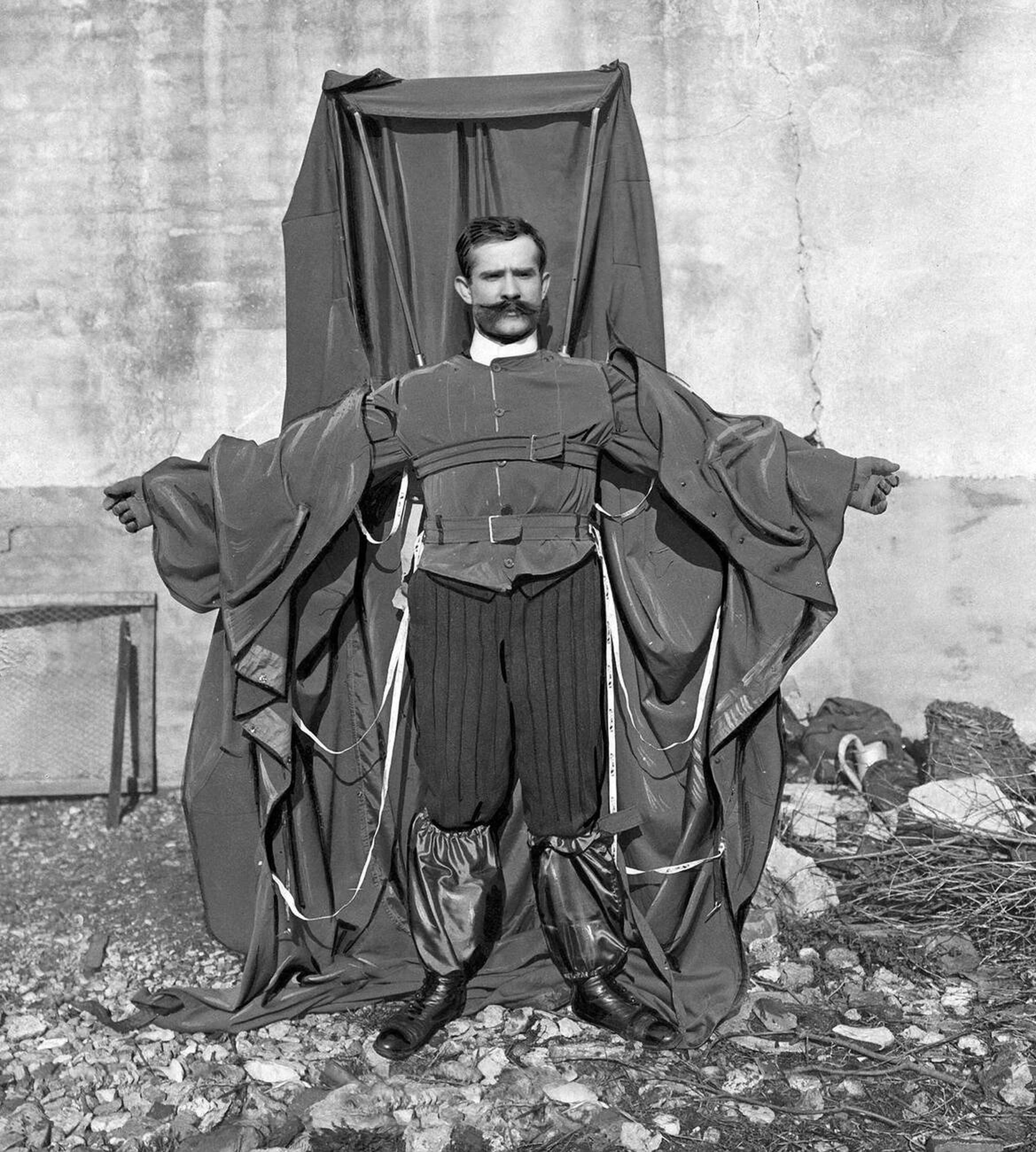
Franz Reichelt before his 1912 jump from the Eiffel Tower

On 4 February 1912, tailor Franz Reichelt jumped from the Eiffel Tower while testing a wearable parachute suit. The canopy did not open and he was killed on impact.

In 1930, American parachutist Rex G. Finney demonstrated fabric wings intended to increase horizontal movement and maneuverability during a parachute jump. Contemporary magazine reports described his equipment and later demonstrations as a "human glider". Other parachutists used rigid or fabric wing systems during air-show demonstrations in the middle decades of the twentieth century, but these experiments did not develop into a widely practiced discipline.

In the early 1990s, French skydiver Patrick de Gayardon developed a self-inflating suit with upper and lower wing surfaces and air inlets. After de Gayardon's death in 1998, Robert Pečnik and Jari Kuosma developed a related design and began producing BirdMan suits in 1999, helping establish the modern commercial era of wingsuit flying.

FAI recognized established performance and acrobatic competition formats in 2015. The first FAI World Cup in performance flying was held that year, and the first FAI World Wingsuit Performance Flying Championships took place in 2016.

== Design and aerodynamics ==
Wingsuit layouts: tri-wing at left and mono-wing at right

A modern wingsuit normally has two arm wings and one leg wing. Air entering inlets inflates fabric cells and forms airfoil-like surfaces around the pilot's body.

Lift, drag and glide performance vary with suit geometry, pilot posture, speed and angle of attack. A 2010 wind-tunnel study compared a conventional suit with a modified design that added area ahead of the arms. The modification increased lift but increased drag by a larger proportion in most test conditions, producing a lower lift-to-drag ratio. The study illustrates that increasing fabric area alone does not necessarily increase aerodynamic efficiency.

Pilots control flight primarily through changes in body position and the shape and tension of the fabric wings. These changes alter angle of attack, speed, glide path and turn rate. Larger suits can provide greater performance but also require more precise control, so training organizations recommend progressive movement through suit sizes.

A 2023 experimental and numerical study of a beginner wingsuit found that sideslip had little effect on lift and drag coefficients within the tested range, but produced nonlinear side forces and rolling and yawing moments.

== Flight and parachute deployment ==
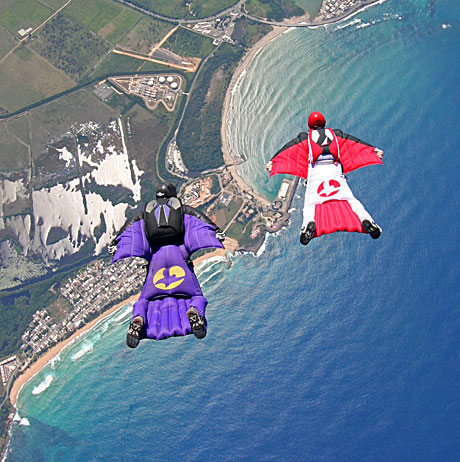
Wingsuit pilots in flight after an aircraft exit

A wingsuit skydive begins with an aircraft exit. The pilot keeps the wings from fully inflating until clear of the aircraft, particularly its tail, and then establishes a planned flight path. Wingsuit groups coordinate their route, breakoff and deployment areas because they can cover several kilometers horizontally and may share airspace with other freefall groups and open parachutes.

During flight, body position is used to vary forward speed, descent rate and direction. Before parachute deployment, the pilot returns to a symmetrical and stable position and uses a pilot chute to extract the main parachute. Arm wings can restrict normal reaching movement, and the wake behind a wingsuit can interfere with pilot-chute inflation, so deployment technique and equipment configuration form a major part of wingsuit training.

After the canopy opens, the pilot releases or unzips the arm wings sufficiently to operate the risers and steering controls. The remainder of the descent is conducted under the parachute.

== Training and equipment ==
Wingsuit training normally follows substantial experience in conventional skydiving. In the United States, USPA Basic Safety Requirements require at least 200 previous skydives and a current skydiving license, and USPA recommends a first-flight course with an experienced wingsuit coach. British Skydiving requires a C Licence, the TR1 qualification and either 500 jumps in total or at least 200 jumps within the preceding 18 months before wingsuit training begins. These differences reflect national systems rather than a single worldwide licensing standard.

An aircraft wingsuit pilot normally uses a dual-parachute sport system with a main and reserve canopy. Because the suit creates a large wake and restricts arm movement, national guidance may recommend particular pilot-chute, bridle, canopy and activation-device configurations. Training also covers aircraft-tail clearance, navigation, group separation, out-of-control flight and parachute malfunctions.

== Sport disciplines and competition ==
=== Performance flying ===
In FAI performance flying, individual competitors complete separate time, distance and speed tasks. GPS data are evaluated within a vertical competition window between 3,000 m (9,800 ft) and 2,000 m (6,600 ft) above ground level. Results from the three tasks are combined into an overall score.

=== Acrobatic flying ===
Acrobatic competition uses a team of two wingsuit performers and a camera flyer. Compulsory rounds use figures selected from a published dive pool, while free rounds are judged for technical execution, presentation, flying style and camera work.

=== Formation flying ===
Formation wingsuit flying involves pilots maintaining planned relative positions and may include horizontal, vertical and sequential formations. FAI maintains separate competition and record documents for wingsuit flying and large-formation records.

== Wingsuit BASE jumping ==
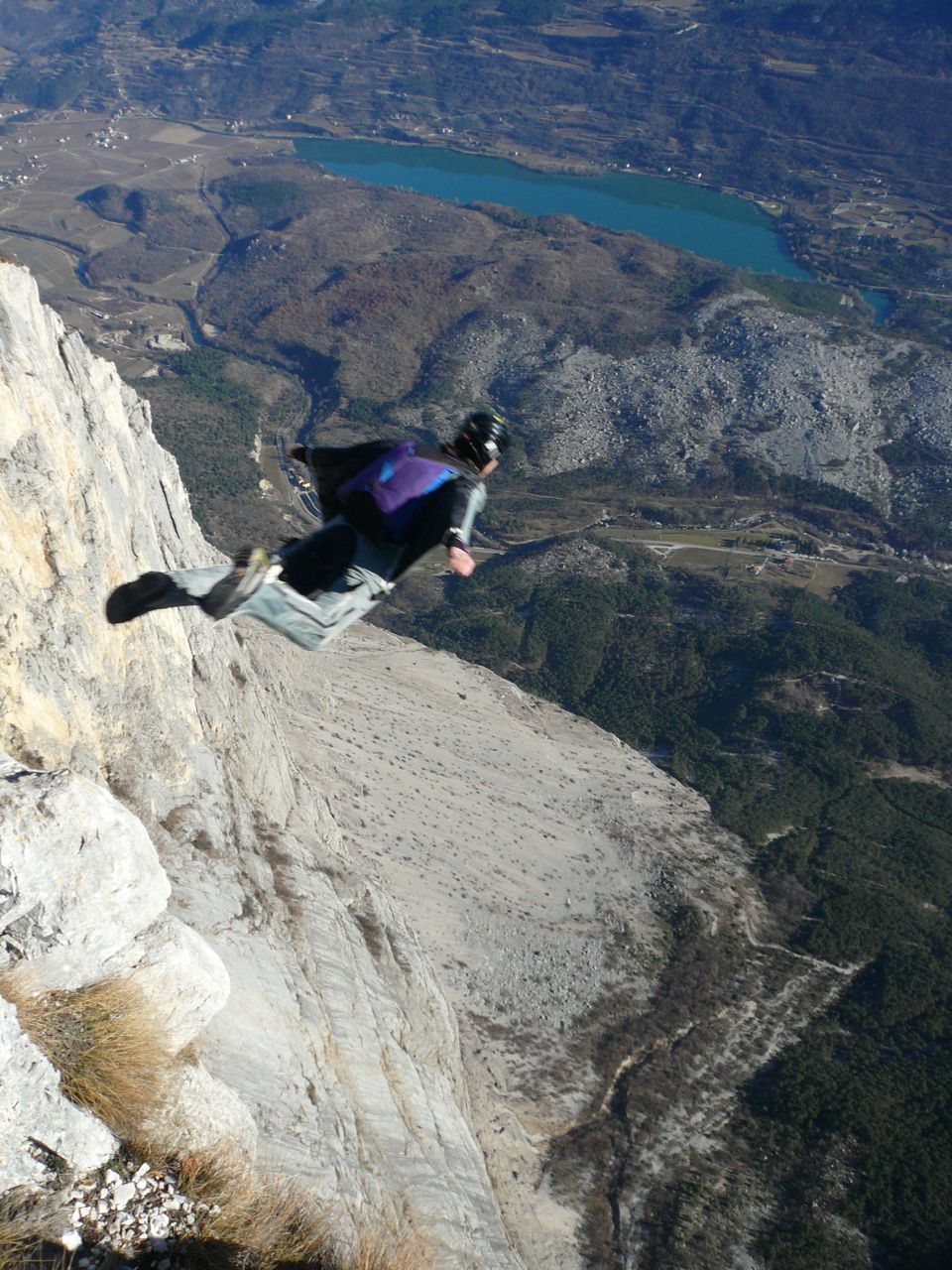
Wingsuit BASE jumping from a cliff

Wingsuit proximity flying near mountain terrain

Wingsuit BASE jumping combines a wingsuit with a jump from a fixed object. Unlike an aircraft exit, a fixed-object exit begins with little or no relative wind, so the suit must accelerate and inflate before it develops full aerodynamic control. BASE systems generally use one parachute designed for rapid opening rather than the main-and-reserve arrangement used in sport skydiving.

The use of modern wingsuits in BASE jumping developed after the commercialization of ram-air suits around 1999. Increased glide performance allowed pilots to travel farther from an exit point and also contributed to the growth of proximity flying, in which a pilot follows terrain at close range.

Flight planning for wingsuit BASE includes the exit, acceleration, terrain clearance, flight path, deployment area and emergency alternatives. Published medical and technical analyses distinguish fixed-object wingsuit flight from aircraft wingsuit skydiving because fixed-object jumps add low exits, terrain exposure and single-parachute equipment.

== Safety ==
For aircraft wingsuit skydiving, identified hazards include collision with the aircraft tail, collision between pilots, out-of-control flight, navigation errors and deployment complications caused by restricted movement or the wake behind the suit. These hazards are addressed through experience requirements, first-flight training, planned routes and breakoff procedures, and equipment recommendations.

The two published fatality studies discussed below concern wingsuit BASE jumping rather than aircraft skydiving. A 2013 study reviewed 180 BASE-jumping fatalities recorded from 1981 through 2011; 39 involved wingsuits. Among those wingsuit cases, 19 resulted from cliff strikes and 18 from ground impact, and flight-path miscalculation was identified in 17 cases.

A later study of 223 BASE-jumping fatalities from 2007 through 2017 identified 137 wingsuit jumps. Impact or object strike was involved in 96% of the recorded fatal events, while low or absent parachute deployment and poor exits were common contributing factors. Both studies relied on case lists rather than a complete count of all jumps, so they describe patterns among reported fatalities rather than a global fatality rate.

== Records ==
FAI registers wingsuit world records for performance and acrobatic competition, distance and time of flight, and large formations. The figures below summarize the ratified current world records in the FAI general category as of 16 August 2026. The performance records were 326.8 km/h (203.1 mph) for speed, set by Chris Geiler on 26 October 2021; 5.572 km (3.462 mi) for horizontal distance, set by Alexey Galda on 25 August 2023; and 112.0 seconds for time, also set by Galda on 17 August 2025. The acrobatic longest-sequence record was 54 grips, set by Germany on 22 August 2023.

The same list included separate ratified records for distance of flight and time of fall, held by Sebastián Álvarez Orellana, with 53.4485 km (33.2114 mi) and 661.29 seconds respectively, both set on 22 March 2025. Ratified current large-formation records included a 61-person horizontal no-grip formation set on 17 October 2015 and a 38-person vertical no-grip formation set on 29 December 2024. The ratified current sequential no-grip record involved 17 pilots completing two formations on 19 September 2025.

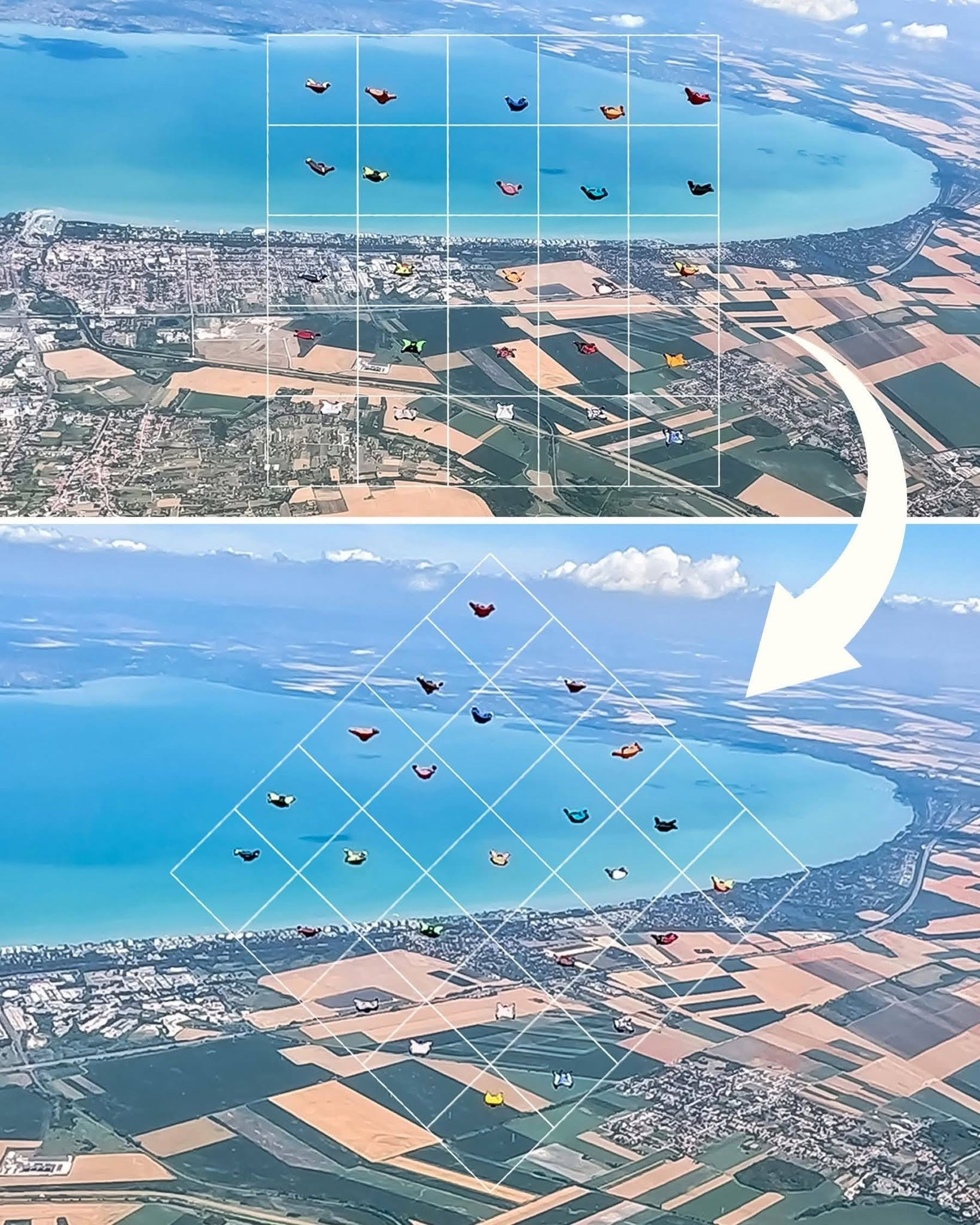
Transition between two 25-person formations during a sequential wingsuit record attempt at Skydive Balaton on 23 June 2026

On 23 June 2026, an international team at Skydive Balaton in Hungary completed two 25-person no-grip formations during one jump. The event account reported that judges accepted the performance in the category Large Formation Sequential Wingsuit no grip - 2 formations. FAI's record-claims list included both world and European 25-person submissions for the performance, while the event account stated that all five records from the meeting were still pending official ratification at the time of publication. FAI also listed European claims for 23-, 24- and 25-person vertical formations dated 21 June.

== See also ==
- Airplane wingsuit formation
- BASE jumping
- Parachuting
- Tracking (skydiving)
