= Jerry Bird (skydiver) =

American skydiver (born 1943)

Personal information
- National team: United States
- Born: March 6, 1943 (age 83) Ellijay, Georgia, US
- Years active: 1966–2000s

Sport
- Country: United States
- Sport: Formation skydiving
- Federation: United States Parachute Association; International Skydiving Commission
- Team: Arvin Good Guys; Jerry Bird's All Stars; United States Freefall Exhibition team; Columbine Turkey Farm; Wings of Orange; Mirror Image

Achievements and titles
- World finals: April 16, 1974: Speed star, 10 Persons (FAI 12667); June 20, 1981: Formation Skydiving, longest sequence (8-way), 14 formations (FAI 12816); October 9, 1981: Formation Skydiving, longest sequence (8-way), 16 formations (FAI 12818)

Jerry Bird (born March 6, 1943) is an American skydiver known for his pioneering role in the development of relative work, now called formation skydiving. As it became a competitive sport, he took part in some of the earliest large group formations, including the first world record ten-man star formation, in 1967, and a then world record 282-person formation in 1999. A member of multiple U.S. national and world championship teams, Bird has been described as the "father" of modern formation skydiving.

== Biography ==
=== Early life and education ===
Bird was born on March 6, 1943, in Ellijay, Georgia, to Carolyn Blanche Woodward and John Marion Bird. He was the fourth of six children. When he was three years old, his family moved to Weirton, West Virginia, where he grew up and attended Weir High School. He then enrolled at West Virginia University, where he studied electrical engineering. Bird moved to Southern California in 1963, making his first sport parachute jump after meeting a woman at a bar and asking her out on a date. (Note: Bird reminiscing in 2019: "[A couple weeks later] I'm going to a bar, a whole bunch of people I knew at my age...I meet a girl, it's probably Thursday night, and I [say], can we hook up, like, make a date on Saturday, and she [says], no. I [ask] why not? She says, "I'm going out of town...I'm going skydiving." I [replied], "Take me!" She [replied], "Everybody says that, and they won't go." And I [replied], "I'll go". She calls her guy [the instructor], Saturday, they come by, and pick me up...and I made my first static jump that day." Collison recounts the same story in Jerry Bird: The Making of a Skydiving Legend. (2025).) She told him that she was busy skydiving on that day, but he convinced her that he would join her. They drove out to the site together, with Bird making his first static line jump that day at the Lancaster drop zone northeast of Los Angeles under the tutelage of Brian Williams.

=== Military service and civilian employment ===
Bird was drafted into the army in 1963. He first studied Russian at the Army Defense Language Institute at Fort Ord in Monterey, California. He then attended the Airborne Jump School at Fort Benning, Georgia in 1965. Bird was assigned to the 10th Special Forces Group Green Berets at Flint Kaserne, Bad Tölz, Germany. He later worked as a computer operator in the 1970s at Security Pacific Optimisation Services in southern California. He moved to Englewood, Colorado, before settling in Tampa, Florida, where he worked as chief parachuting instructor at Zephyrhills Parachute Centre (which hosted the 1981 World Parachute Championships) and later the Phoenix Parachute Center. In late 1990, he became co-founder and manager of the Skydive City Zephyrhills drop zone. Under his management, Skydive City typically flew ten plane-loads of skydivers daily, with up to 700 a day jumping over Zephyrhills. "The Bird House", (Note: From the Skydive City FAQ: "Why is our main entertainment center called, The Bird House? The Bird House was named for Jerry Bird, a founding member of Skydive City – widely recognized as "The Father of Relative Work".) Skydive City's bar, skydiving museum, and community gathering place, was named in his honor.

== Skydiving career ==
Formation skydiving first developed as a parachuting discipline in the late 1950s when parachutists in freefall began to deliberately maneuver toward each other and sometimes pass a wooden baton (a feat first recorded in 1958). Over time, larger groups engaged in baton passing, and on May 16, 1966, Bird participated in the first 10-man baton pass, over Arvin, California.

The creation of linked formations quickly followed, and on July 2, 1967, Bird participated in the first world record formation, a 10-man star over Taft, California, a milestone achievement in what was then called "relative work" (now known as formation skydiving). Bird has been described as a "pioneer" and "major innovator" in relative work. The following year, he participated in the first 12-man formation, also over Taft. On January 16, 1972, Bird organized a world record 24-man star formation over Perris Valley California. The jump was featured on the CBS program I've Got a Secret and in the February 4, 1972, issue of Life magazine.

=== Team competition ===
Bird became a founding member of the Arvin Good Guys, and, in 1968, formed Jerry Bird's All Stars 10-way speed skydiving team based at Elsinore, California. In 1970, he captained the United States Freefall Exhibition Team (USFET) which demonstrated relative work at the 10th World Parachuting Championships in Bled, Slovenia, which led to formation skydiving being recognized as a distinct competition discipline.

Jerry Bird's All Stars won the 10-man star event in June 1972 at the National Championships in Tahlequah, Oklahoma. Bird later organized a world record 26-man star at the close of the 11th World Parachuting Championships, also at Tahlequah.

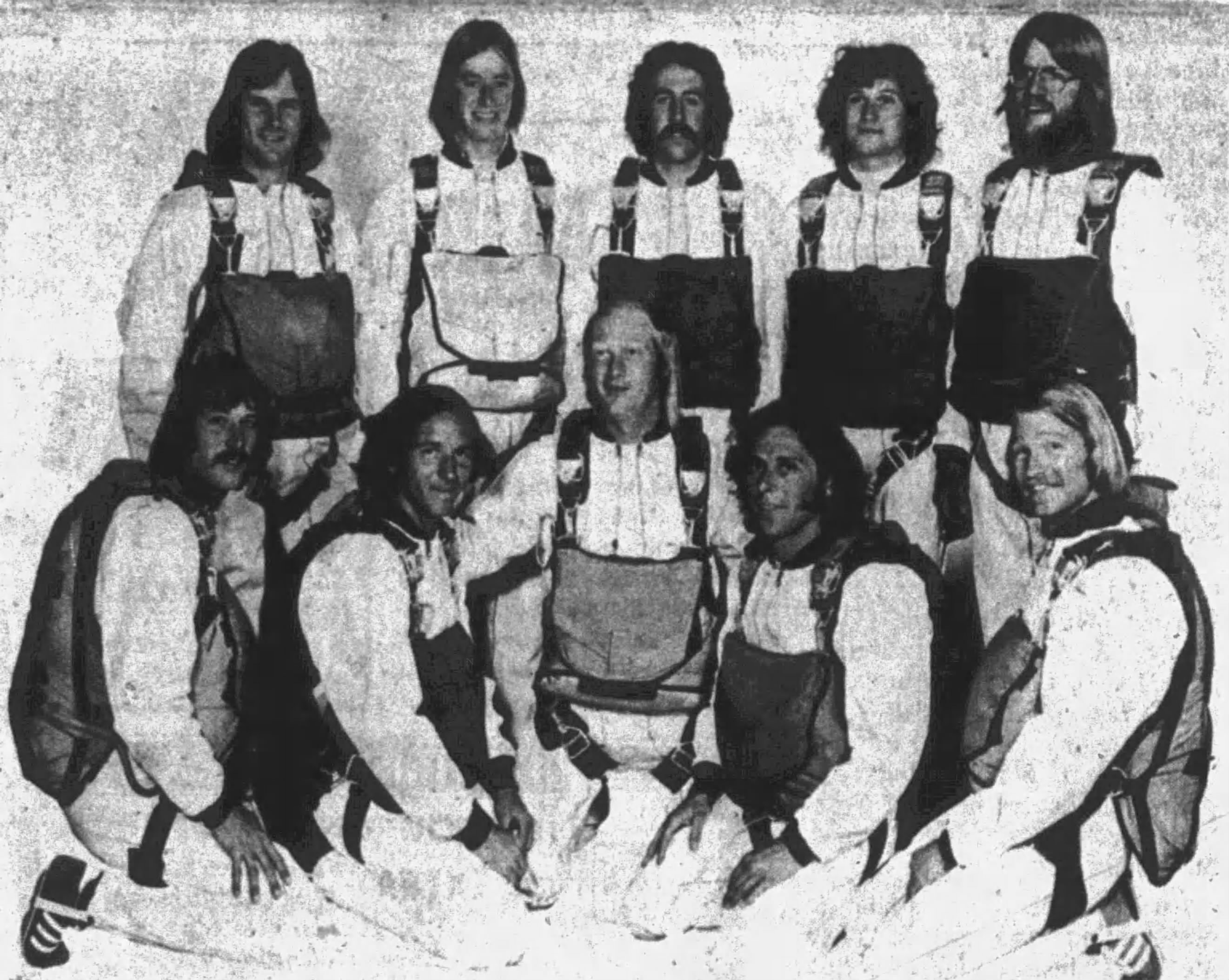
Bird (center, bottom row) with the Wings of Orange

Bird's 10-way speed star team, The Columbine Turkey Farm (based at Casa Grande, Arizona), won the World Cup Championship in 1973 at Fort Bragg, North Carolina, with a time of 15.6 seconds. The team subsequently relocated to the Orange Municipal Airport in Massachusetts where Bird had negotiated a contract with a local parachute company and the team became the Wings of Orange. Bird captained the Wings Of Orange 10-way speed star team in 1974, setting a new world record of 12.76 seconds at Pretoria in South Africa, and receiving a congratulatory telegram from the White House. Bird broke a bone in his foot while in South Africa (he refused a cast, and assigned someone to catch him and help ease his landing). Two weeks later, the Wings of Orange also won the European Continental Championships at La Ferte Gaucher in France.

Bird joined Mirror Image, an 8-way RW sequential team, in 1979. The team was later described as "sky gods" (top performers who had completed thousands of jumps). The Mirror Image lineup posted new world records in 8-way, first with an 11-pointer in 1979, then with a 16-pointer in 1981. Mirror Image also posted a 10-way speed star world record in 1979. Just to make a point, they completed a 10-way Star in 5.16 seconds exiting from a DC-3 door. They won the National Championship in 8-way sequential in 1981 while setting a world record of 14 maneuvers in 48.3 seconds. Bird later became the coach for the Mirror Image team.

=== Base jumping ===
Bird organized an expedition to Venezuela in November 1983 to BASE jump from the 979 metres (3,212 ft) high Angel Falls. The jump was filmed for a documentary by Mark III Productions of Miami, Florida. A segment from the footage was broadcast on ABC's Ripley's Believe It or Not! in December 1985.

=== "The Bird Machine", boogies and seminars ===
Bird also toured the US visiting skydiving events (boogies) and giving seminars in a DC-3 ("The Bird Machine") enabling enthusiasts to jump from a bigger aircraft at higher altitudes. By 1985, Bird estimated he had made 4,300 jumps in 23 years of skydiving. He also jumped to mark special events such as store openings, and worked as a stunt skydiver in the documentary Playground in the Sky (1977).

=== Further world records ===
Bird was part of the world record formation 120-way in 1986 at Quincy, Illinois. Two years later, on August 8, 1988, Bird was part of the world record 144-way diamond formation, also over Quincy. In 1991, Bird said he had made over 7,000 jumps. On July 19, 1998, Bird was part of the 246-way world record formation over Skydive Chicago. In April the following year, Bird co-organised a team which attempted a two-point sequential 126-way jump (126 skydivers link in one predetermined formation, then reform in a different design) at Skydive Sebastian in Florida. Bird, who is described as the "Father of Modern Day Skydiving", had then logged over 11,000 jumps. He said: "It's not a muscle sport. It's technique. As you get older and have more jumps, you get better. We have people here in their 20s up to their 60s."

Later in 1999, Bird was part of the 282-way world record formation with The World Team in Thailand. He continued to support skydiving events across the US, jumping in the world's second largest skydive event, the Boogie 2001, at Richmond, Indiana, which attracted over 1,250 registered skydivers in September 2001; his career total of jumps then topped 12,080.

== Honors and awards ==
- Bob Buquor Memorial Star Crest Recipient (SCR) number 11 (n.d.)
- Exhibition Flight, National Air and Space Museum in Washington, D.C. (1977)
- da Vinci Diploma, Fédération Aéronautique Internationale (1984)
- International Skydiving Museum Hall of Fame (2010)
- Štefan Banič Parachute Foundation gold medal (2011)
- Pioneers of Excellence Award, International Skydiving Museum Hall of Fame, United States Freefall Exhibition team (2022)
- Pioneers of Excellence Award, International Skydiving Museum Hall of Fame, Jerry Bird's All Stars (2024).
