= CFFS =

CFFS may refer to:

- Citizens for Fire Safety, a U.S. nonprofit
- Combat Field Feeding System for United States military rations; see B-ration
- Canadian Federation of Film Societies, see Cinema of Canada
- Canadian Forces Fleet School, see Outline of the Canadian Armed Forces at the end of the Cold War

== See also ==
- CFS (disambiguation)
- CFF (disambiguation), for the singular of CFFs
- CFFSI
