= World Parachuting Championships =

Biennial competitive parachuting championship

World Parachuting Championships is the main competitive parachuting championships in the World, and is organised by Fédération Aéronautique Internationale.

== 2022 ==
- Parachuting (Skydiving): 9-26 October 2022 in Eloy, Arizona, USA, and is organised by Skydive Arizona.
1. 20th FAI World Canopy formation Championships
2. 9th FAI World Canopy piloting Championships
3. 3rd FAI World Canopy Piloting Freestyle Championships
4. 4th FAI World Wingsuit flying Championships
5. 25th FAI World Formation skydiving Championships
6. 14th FAI World Artistic Events Championships
7. 4th FAI World Speed skydiving Championships

== Canopy piloting ==
=== Events ===
- Distance
- Speed
- Accuracy
- Freestyle

=== Championships ===
	Year	City	Country	Date	Venue	No. of Athletes	No. of Nations
1st	2006	Vienna	Austria	23–27 August			
2nd	2008	Pretoria	South Africa	18–23 November			
3rd	2010	Kolomna	Russia	7–15 August			
4th	2012	Dubai	United Arab Emirates	28 November – 9 December			
5th	2014	Zephyrhills	United States	1–7 November			
6th	2016	Farnham	Canada	20–25 August	Unmatched		
7th	2018	Wrocław, Szymanów	Poland	3–10 July			
8th	2022	Skydive Arizona, Eloy, Arizona	United States	9–26 October			
9th	2024	Pretoria	South Africa	25–29 September			
10th	2026	Skydive Arizona, Eloy, Arizona	United States	19–24 October			

== Landing and style ==
=== Events ===
- Accuracy landing
- Freefall style

=== Championships ===
List is incomplete

	Year	City	Country	Date	Venue	No. of Athletes	No. of Nations
23rd	1996	Békéscsaba	Hungary	14 September- 22 September			
28th	2004	Rijeka	Croatia				
29th	2006	Stupino	Russia				
30th	2008	Lučenec	Slovakia				
31st	2010	Nikšić	Montenegro	28 August – 4 September			
32nd	2012	Dubai	United Arab Emirates	28 November – 9 December			
33rd	2014	Banja Luka	Bosnia and Herzegovina	15 – 23 August			
36th	2021	Kemerovo	Russia	9 – 21 August			
37th	2022	Strakonice	Czech Republic	18 – 23 July			
38th	2024	Prostějov	Czech Republic	1 – 6 September			

== Skydiving ==
=== Events ===
- Formation skydiving (4-Way, 4-Way Women, 8-Way, VFS 4-Way)
- Artistic (Freestyle skydiving, Freeflying)
- Speed skydiving

=== Championships ===
List is incomplete

	Year	City	Country	Date	Venue	No. of Athletes	No. of Nations
17th	2006	Gera	Germany				
18th	2008	Vieux-Reng	France		Skydive Maubeuge		
19th	2010	Menzelinsk	Russia	31 July – 6 August			
20th	2012	Dubai	United Arab Emirates	28 November – 9 December			
21st	2014	Prostějov	Czech Republic	25–31 August			
22nd	2016	Chicago	USA	September			
23rd	2018	Gold Coast	Australia	7–13 October	Runaway Bay		
—	2024	Beaufort	USA	6–11 October	Crystal Coast Skydiving		
—	2026	Eloy	United States	19–24 October	Skydive Arizona		
