= Formation skydiving =

Discipline of sport parachuting

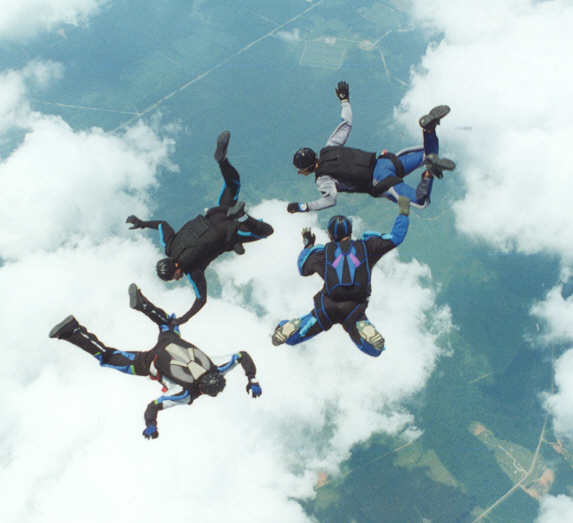
4-way FS (formation skydiving)

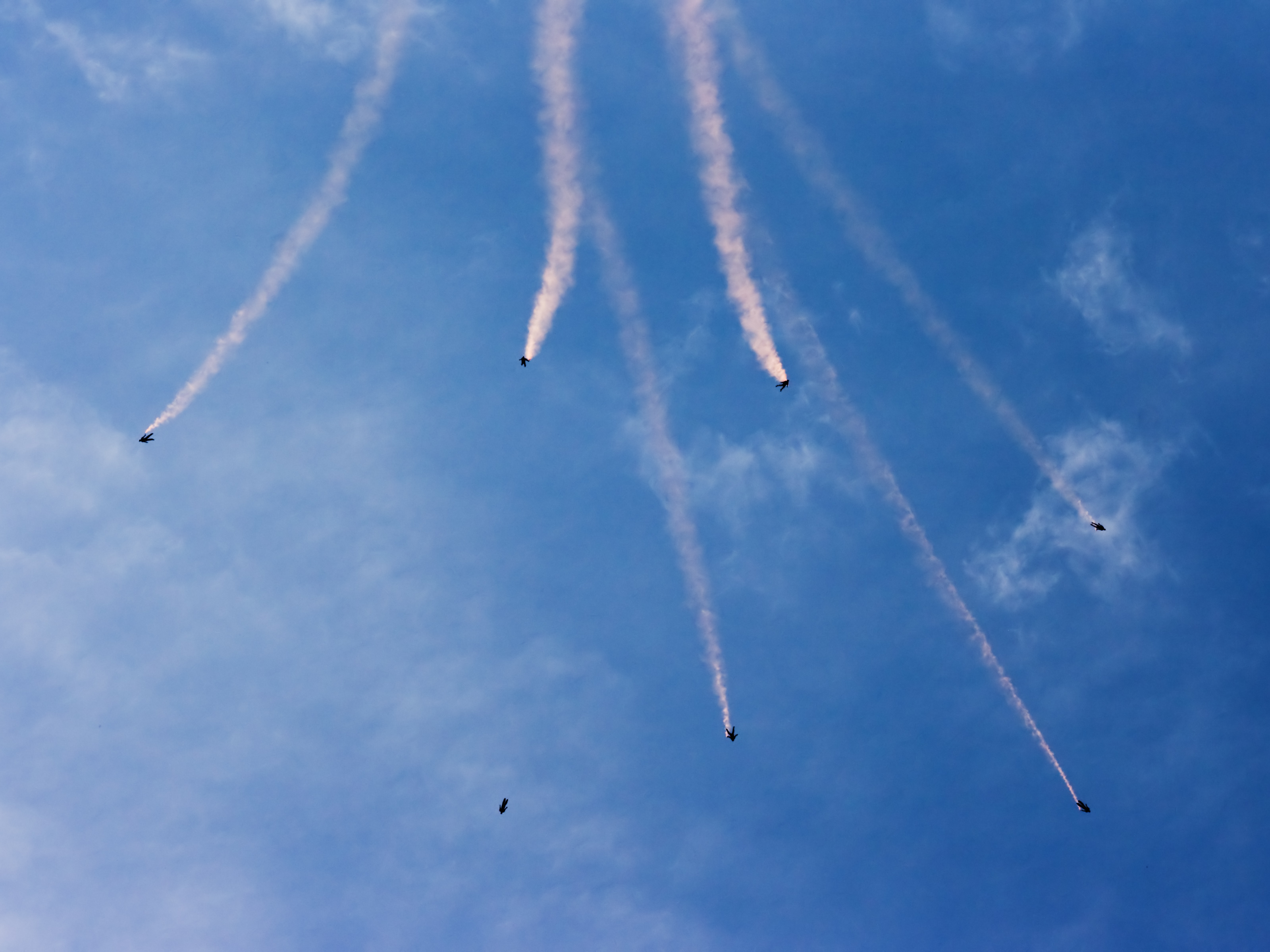
Breaking off from a formation before parachute deployment.

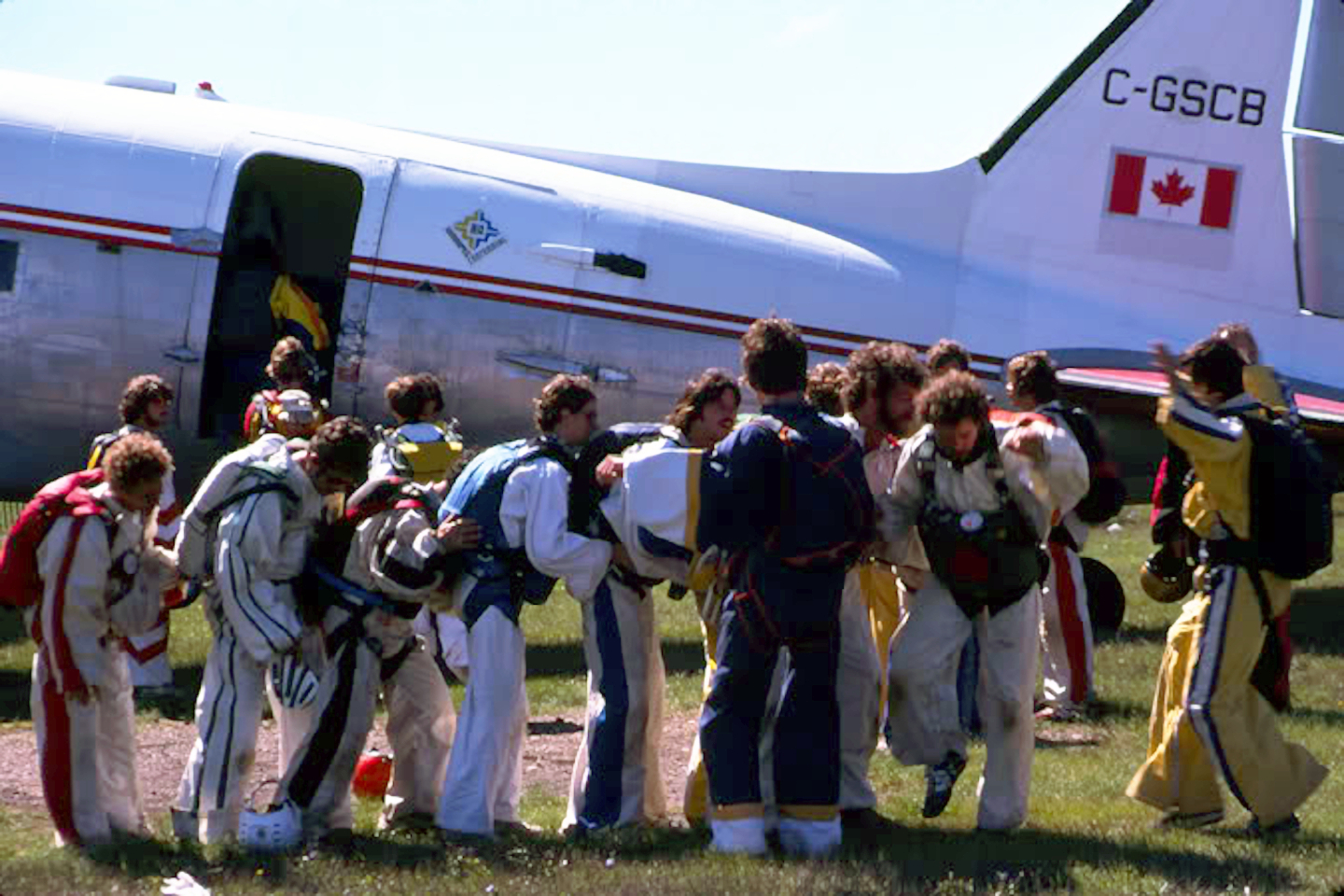
DC-3 loading; plus 'dirt diving'; 1977

Formation skydiving, traditionally called "relative work" (RW) or "group freefall", is a discipline of sport parachuting where two or more participants intentionally maneuver to close proximity with each other in freefall before separating and deploying their parachutes.

== History ==
Formation skydiving started in California, US, during the 1960s. The first documented skydiving formation occurred over Arvin, California in March 1964 when Mitch Poteet, Don Henderson, Andy Keech and Lou Paproski successfully formed a 4-man star formation, photographed by Bob Buquor.

In 1967, the first 10-man star was formed over Taft, California, and the first 12-man formation was formed, also over Taft, in 1968. Jerry Bird participated in both of these record-breaking formations and in 1970 captained the United States Freefall Exhibition Team (USFET) which demonstrated formation skydiving at the 1970 World Championships in Bled, Slovenia. This led to formation skydiving becoming a recognized competition discipline in its own right.

In 1972, Bird organized a world record 24-man star formation over Perris Valley California. The jump was featured on the CBS program I've Got a Secret and in Life magazine. Later (on June 16), Jerry Bird's All Stars won the Ten-Man Star event at the National Championships in Tahlequah, Oklahoma, and Bird organized a world record 26-man star at the close of the 11th World Parachuting Championships, also at Tahlequah. During the 1980s and 1990s, Bird joined further record-breaking Big-ways formations: a 120-way at Quincy, Illinois in 1986; a 144-way diamond formation in August 1988, also over Quincy; a 246-way formation over Chicago in July 1998; and, in 1999, a 282-way formation in Thailand.

The current FAI world record for the largest free-fall formation is a 400-way, set on February 8, 2006, in Udon Thani, Thailand by the World Team.

== Sub-categories ==
Formation skydiving can be further divided into several sub-categories, so named for the number of members in a team:

- 4-way sequential
- 4-way vertical sequential (VFS, Vertical Formation Skydiving)
- 8-way sequential
- 16-way sequential
- 10-way speed
- Large formations (Big-ways)

== Competitive format ==
A competition in 4-way sequential formation skydiving (FS-4) takes place like this:

There are two kinds of formations, called randoms and blocks. The randoms are singular formations with full separation of all grips both before and after building the formation. The blocks are double formations with a special designated movement pattern in between, called an inter. The start formation may or may not be similar to the ending formation. The inters are differently performed. Here are some examples:

Inter 1: The grips are released between some of the flyers, so they become two pieces of two team members. They both do a 270° turn, and reconnect to a different formation.

Inter 2: Three people stay connected and do a 360° turn, while the last person flies alone.

Inter 15: All grips are released and everyone does a 360° turn back to the original formation.

Blocks are designated by numbers, while randoms get letters. Blocks are worth one point for each correct formation, which makes 2 points, and randoms count as 1 point. There are 22 blocks and 16 randoms.

Competition consists of up to 10 rounds, and each round consists of 5 or 6 points, which the teams are to repeat as many times as they can within the working time of 35 seconds. The score judging is based on the videographer's material.

A competition draw may look like this:

- 1: C-E-B-13
- 2: 14-20-8
- 3: 15-16-H
- 4: J-O-1-D
- 5: 6-18-19
- 6: 5-F-21
- 7: 10-K-G-M
- 8: 22-3-P
- 9: 12-9-4
- 10:11-17-Q

The winning team will be the team that has collected the most points, by completing the most correct formations within time after the final round is ended. In case of weather, technical problems, or other interruptions, a competition will be valid as long as all teams have completed at least one round.

A recent sub-category of formation skydiving is vertical formation skydiving (VFS). Skydivers build formations using higher-speed body positions normally associated with freeflying, such as head down and sitflying.

== World record ==
- Big-Way:

The current FAI world record for largest free-fall formation is a 400-way, set on February 8, 2006, in Udon Thani, Thailand by the World Team. It was held for 4.3 seconds. With the support of the Thai government, they used five C-130 Hercules airplanes and exited from an altitude of 25,400 feet. In April 2013 the World Team tried to break the record for the largest 2-point formation dive in skydiving history. All 222 members came together and made a formation, broke apart, and then reformed to make a completely different formation. The team attempted the jump many times and came very close to breaking the record, but were unsuccessful each time. The World Team has not made anymore official statements about attempting the record again.

Longest sequence in one round:

- 4-Way

Set by the Belgian team(NMP-PCH Hayabusa), at the World Meet 2018 in round 6, where they posted 62 points in working time (35 seconds)

- 8-Way

Set by the U.S. (GKXP8) national team, at the World Meet 2024, in round 9, where they posted 37 points in working time (50 seconds)

== World championship ==
Year	Venue	Airplane	4-Way Champion	Points (avg)	8-Way Champion	Points (avg)	4-Way Female Champion	Points (avg)	4-Way Vertical Formation	Points (avg)
1975	West Germany; Warendorf		United States	40/49.92*	United States	100/163.85*	Not Held		Not Held	
1977	Australia; Gatton, Queensland		Canada	73 (7.3)	United States; West Germany; France	42 (4.2)	Not Held		Not Held	
1979	France; Châteauroux		Canada	82 (8.2)	United States	66 (6.6)	Not Held		Not Held	
1981	United States; Zephyrhills, Florida		United States	116 (11.6)	United States	83 (8.3)	Not Held		Not Held	
1983	South Africa; Sun City, North West		Switzerland	115 (11.5)	United States	102 (10.2)	Not Held		Not Held	
1985	(Socialist Federal Republic of Yugoslavia) Yugoslavia; Mali Lošinj		(United States) USA; Canada; France	118 (11.8)	(United States) USA; France; Canada	120 (12.0)	Not Held		Not Held	
1987	Brazil; Foz do Iguacu		France (United States) USA; Austria	134 (13.4)	(United States) USA; France (Soviet Union) USSR	119 (13.2) (9 rd)	Not Held		Not Held	
1989	Spain; Gerona		France (Soviet Union) USSR (United States) USA	152 (15.2)	(United States) USA (Soviet Union) USSR; France	138 (13.8)	Not Held		Not Held	
1991	(Czech Republic) Czechoslovakia; Lučenec	Mil Mi-8	France (United States) USA; Italy	171 (17.1)	(United States) USA; France (Soviet Union) USSR	181 (18.1)	Not Held		Not Held	
1993	United States; Eloy, Arizona	DHC-6 Twin Otter	France (United States) USA; Denmark	195 (19.5)	(United States) USA; France; Russia	169 (16.9)	Not Held		Not Held	
1995	France; Gap, Hautes-Alpes	Pilatus PC-6 Porter	(United States) USA; France; Denmark	207 (20.7)	(United States) USA; France; Russia	195 (19.5)	Not Held		Not Held	
1997	Turkey; Efes	CASA C-212 Aviocar	(United States) USA (France) France; South Africa	210 (21.0)	(United States) USA; Russia; France	224 (22.4)	Not Held		Not Held	
1999	Australia; Corowa	DHC-6 Twin Otter	France (United States) USA; Norway	208 (20.8)	(United States) USA; Russia; France	211 (21.1)	Not Held		Not Held	
2001	Spain; Granada	CASA C-212 Aviocar	(United States) USA; France; Norway	214 (21.4)	Russia (United States) USA; France	193 (19.3)	(United States) USA; Norway; Sweden	147 (14.7)	Not Held	
2003	France; Gap, Hautes-Alpes	Pilatus PC-6 Porter	France (United States) USA; Norway	229 (22.9)	Russia (United States) USA; France	221 (20.9) (11 rd)	(United Kingdom) Great Britain; Norway (United States) USA	165 (16.5)	Not Held	
2004	Croatia; Rijeka	Mil Mi-8	(United States) USA; France; Russia	227 (22.7)	(United States) USA; France; Russia	172 (19.1) (9 rd)	(United States) USA; France; Russia	169 (16.9)	Not Held	
2006	Germany; Gera	DHC-6 Twin Otter	(United States) USA; France; Italy	117 (23.4) (5 rd)	France (United States) USA; Russia	123 (20.5) (6 rd)	(United Kingdom) Great Britain; France; Russia	95 (19.0) (5 rd)	Not Held	
2008	France; Maubeuge	Pilatus PC-6 Porter	(United States) USA (France) France; Belgium	195 (24.4) (8 rd)	France (United States) USA; Italy	151 (21.6) (7 rd)	(United Kingdom) Great Britain (United States) USA; France	120 (20.0) (6 rd)	Not Held	
2010	Russia; Menzelinsk	L-410 Turbolet	France (United States) USA; Russia	277 (27.7)	France (United States) USA; Russia	203 (20.3)	France (United Kingdom) Great Britain (United States) USA	236 (23.6)	Not Held	
2012	(United Arab Emirates) UAE; Dubai	DHC-6 Twin Otter	(United States) USA (Belgium) Belgium; France	279 (27.9)	(United States) USA (France) France; Russia	229 (22.9)	(United States) USA (France) France; Norway	207 (20.7)	France (United Arab Emirates) UAE (United States) USA	185 (23,1) (8 rd)
2014	Czech Republic; Prostějov	L-410 Turbolet	Belgium (United States) USA; Canada	264 (26.4)	(United States) USA (Russia) Russia; France	216 (21.6)	(France) France (United States) USA (United Kingdom) Great Britain	214 (21.4)	(France) France (United States) USA; Canada	179 (22,4) (8 rd)
2016	United States; Chicago	DHC-6 Twin Otter	(Belgium) Belgium (United States) USA; France	262 (26.2)	(United States) USA (France) France; Russia	239 (23.9)	(United States) USA (France) France (United Kingdom) Great Britain	224 (22.4)	(France) France (Canada) Canada (United States) USA	168 (22.4) (8 rd)
2018	Australia; Gold Coast, Queensland	Cessna 208 Caravan	(Belgium) Belgium (United States) USA; France	279 (27.9)	(United States) USA; Russia; Qatar	224 (22,4)	(France) France (United Kingdom) Great Britain; Sweden	257 (25,7)	(United States) USA (Canada) Canada; Australia	217 (21,7)
2020 (2021)	Russia; Kemerovo region	L-410 Turbolet	Belgium (United States) USA; Qatar	193 (32,2) (6 rd)	(United States) USA (France) France; RPF	166 (23,7) (7 rd)	RPF (France) France; Poland	150 (25,0) (6 rd)	(United States) USA; RPF; Italy	143 (20,4) (7 rd)
2022	United States; Eloy, Arizona	DHC-6 Twin Otter	(United States) USA; Belgium (Qatar) Qata	261; 228; 219	(United States) USA; Qatar; Germany	205; 164; 131	(United Kingdom) Great Britain; France (United States) USA	200; 189; 184	(United States) USA; Australia; Norway	212; 190; 140
2024	United States; Crystal Coast, North Carolina	DHC-6 Twin Otter	(United States) USA; France; Qatar		(United States) USA; Qatar; Germany		(United States) USA; China; France		(United States) USA; Norway; Italy	
2026	United States; Eloy, Arizona	DHC-6 Twin Otter	TBC		TBC		TBC		Not Held	

== See also ==
- Canopy formation
