= CFF =

CFF may refer to:

== Arts, entertainment, and media ==
- Celebrity Family Feud, a 2008 NBC game show hosted by Al Roker
- Charcoal Feather Federation, an anime television series by Yoshitoshi ABe

== Computing ==
- Common File Format, a video file format that is part of the UltraViolet digital rights authentication and licensing system
- Compact Font Format, a font technology
- Citation File Format, a YAML-based format for software citation metadata

== Events ==
- Chattanooga Film Festival, an annual film festival in Chattanooga, Tennessee
- Chicago Fringe Festival, an annual performing arts festival in Chicago, Illinois

== Organizations and enterprises ==
- Cambodian Freedom Fighters, a militant rebel group
- Central Facility for Funds, a post-trade service by Clearstream
- Swiss Federal Railways, (French: Chemins de fer fédéraux suisses)
- Children First Foundation
- Children's Film Foundation
- Cornish Fighting Fund, a campaign for Cornish recognition
- Croatian Football Federation, the governing body of football in Croatia
- Curaçao Football Federation, the governing body of football in Curaçao
- Cystic Fibrosis Foundation

== Other uses ==
- Cafunfo Airport, an Angolan airport with this IATA code
- Certified in Financial Forensics, a specialty designation for Certified Public Accountants awarded by the AICPA
- Consistent Force Field, a force field in molecular mechanics
- Critical flicker fusion rate or threshold, a concept in the psychophysics of vision

== See also ==
- CF2
- CF (disambiguation)
- CFFS (disambiguation)
