= CRW =

CRW can be:

- Yeager Airport in Charleston, West Virginia (IATA Code: CRW)
- Continuous-rod warhead
- Raw image format extension for Canon Raw Format
- Canard Rotor/Wing, an aircraft configuration used by the Boeing X-50 Dragonfly
- Crawley railway station station code
- Canopy relative work skydiving discipline
- A pseudonym of Italian electronic music producer Mauro Picotto
