= Speed skydiving =

Skydiving competition

Speed skydiving is a skydiving discipline in which the goal is to achieve and maintain the highest possible terminal velocity. It was developed in the late 1990s and is the fastest non-motorized sport on Earth. The speed, achieved by the human body in free fall, is a function of several factors; including the body's mass, orientation, and skin area and texture. In stable, belly-to-earth position, terminal velocity is about 200 km/h (120 mph). Stable freefall head down position has a terminal speed of 240–290 km/h (around 150–180 mph). Further minimization of drag by streamlining the body allows for speeds over 500 km/h (310 mph).

== Competition ==
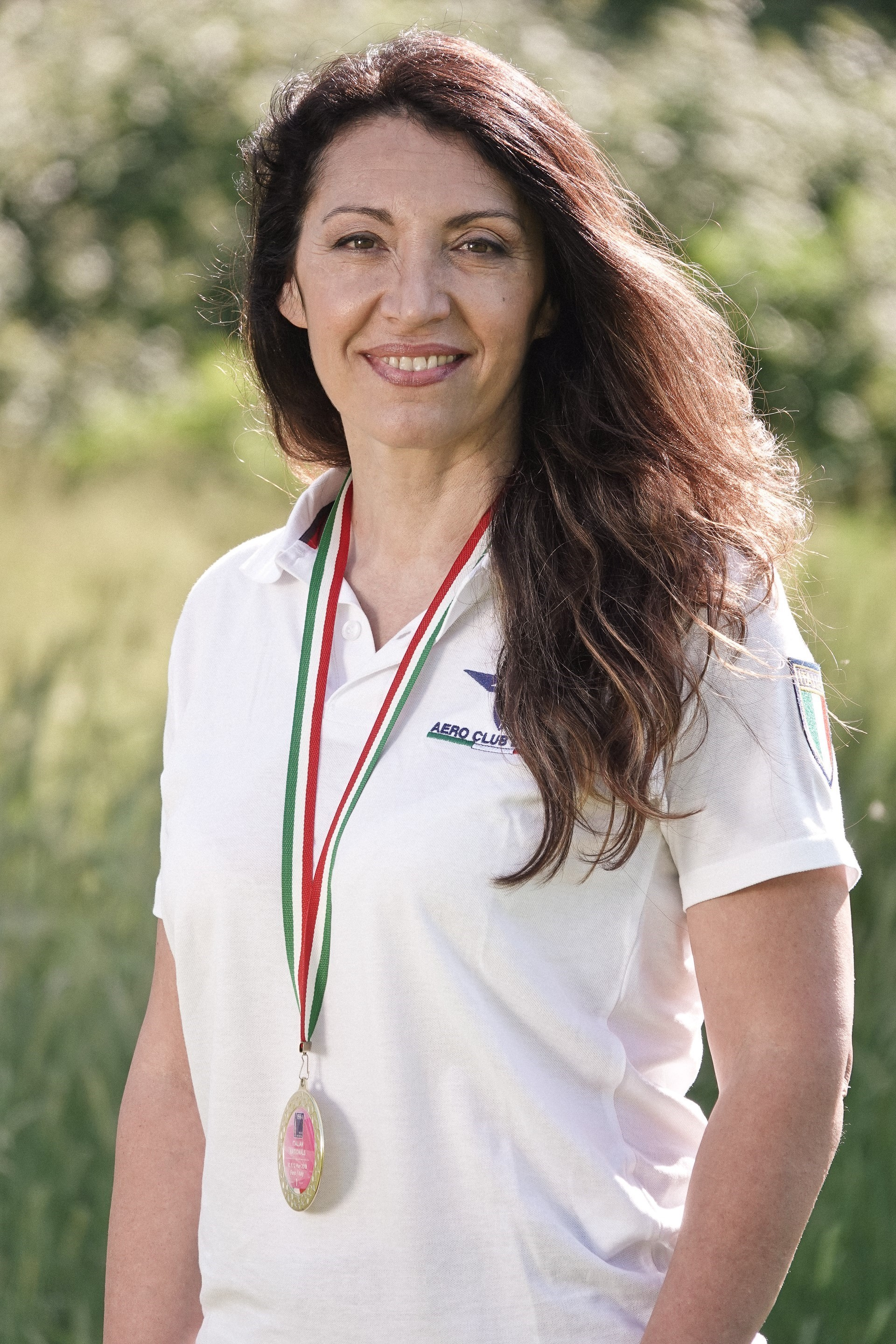
Mascia Ferri, winner of the Italian Nationals gold medal in 2019

Speed skydiving is a competition discipline within the sport of skydiving. The competition objective is for the competitors to fly their body as fast as possible to achieve the highest average vertical speed through a 3-second window.

The speed is measured using a speed measuring device (SMD) worn on the competitor's helmet. The current technology used to measure the speed is GPS technology using the FlySight device (https://www.flysight.ca/). Previously (see below) barometric measuring devices were used.

The competitors exit from the competition aircraft between 13,000 ft and 14,000 ft (3,962 m to 4,267 m). Each competitor then turns 90° from the direction in which the aircraft is travelling, alternately left and right. The competitors then accelerate by flying head-first towards the earth, only slowing down once they have passed the 7,400 ft competition window from their exit altitude. The score is the average vertical speed in km/h of the fastest 3 seconds which the competitor achieves within the competition window.

Speeding skydiving is now one of the disciplines governed by the International Skydiving Commission (https://fai.org/commission/isc), a commission of the FAI (https://fai.org/). Before being adopted by the ISC, speed skydiving was governed by International Speed Skydiving Association (https://www.issa.one/), who developed initial rules and continues to conduct competitions. The ISSA maintains eternal ranking lists for the current GPS measured events (https://www.issa.one/speed-skydiving-eternal-ranking-gps/) and archived performances 2000-2018) measured using barometric SMDs (https://www.issa.one/speed-skydiving-eternal-ranking-baro-archive/).

== Records ==
The current world record for the fastest competitor using the GPS measuring system is Sebastian Garcia from Spain. He flew 539.51 km/h (335.24 mph) in the competition window at the 6th FAI World Cup of Speed Skydiving in August 2025. The fastest female competitor is Brianne Thompson from the United States who flew 497.80 km/h (309.32 mph) at the 2024 USPA National Skydiving Championships in Ottawa.

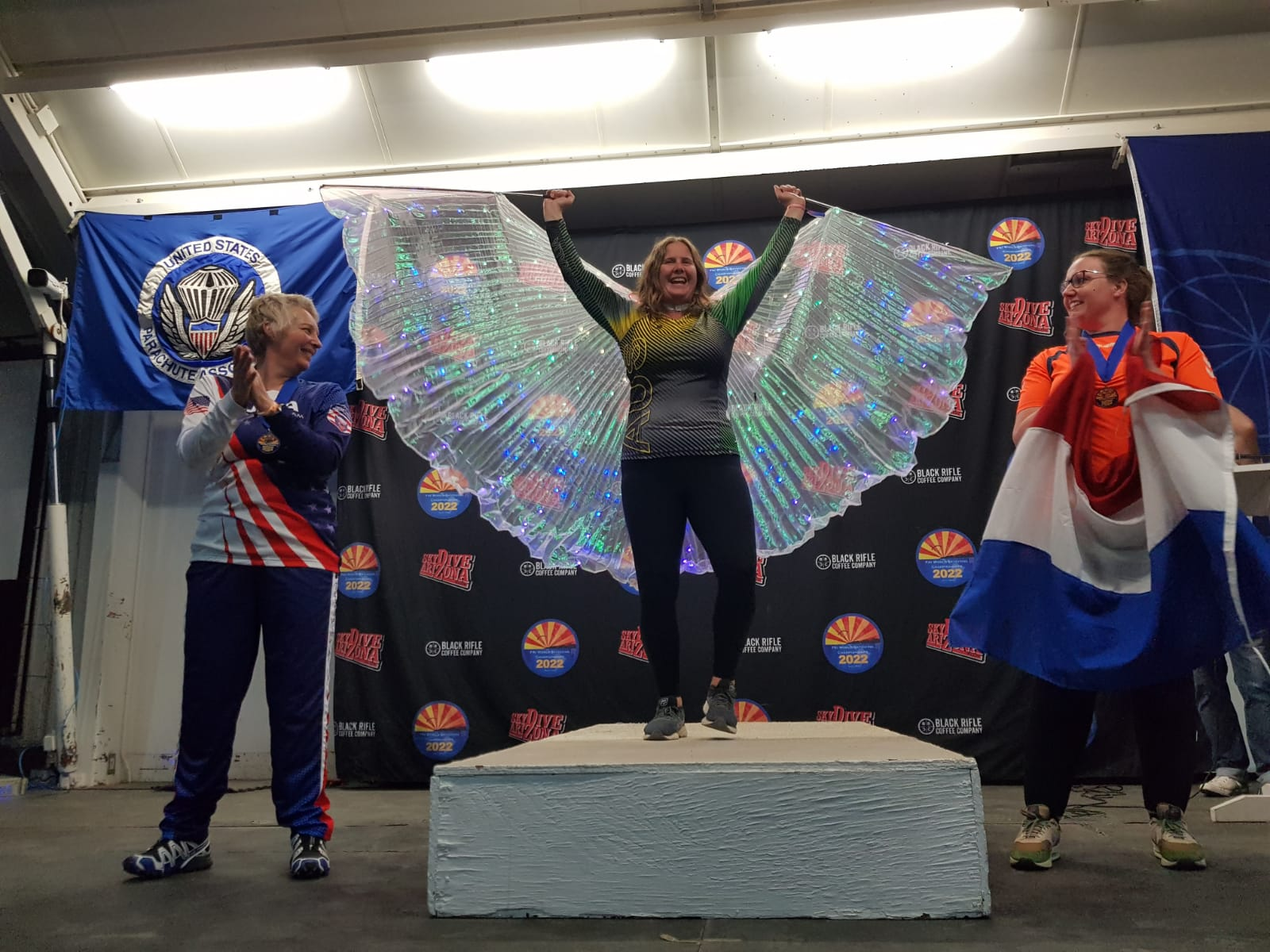
2022 World Championships Podium: Natisha Dingle (1st), Maxine Tate (2nd), Ingrid van Deelen (3rd)

== History ==
The first competition organized in the US was in Deland (Florida) in 1998 with the barometric Protrack built by Larsen & Brusgaard (https://www.lbaltimeters.com/). The first speed skydiving competition in Europe was organized in September 1999 at the drop zone Gap-Tallard (France) and was won by Mike Brooke. The first international world cup was organized in 2000 by the ISST (International Speed Skydiving Tribe) led by Mike Brooke who pushed the sport forwards with use of two measuring devices. The devices were set on each side of the parachute of each participant instead of the foot to take away effects of dynamic air pressure on the results. An international speed skydiving world cup has been run in Deland (Florida), Lincolnshire (UK), Botten (Switzerland), Lapalisse (France), Empuriabrava (Spain), Texel (Holland).

== Terminal velocity ==
The terminal velocity of a falling body occurs during free fall when the force due to gravity is exactly balanced by the force due to air resistance, such that the body experiences zero acceleration. The formula for terminal velocity (where buoyancy in air is negligible) is given by the thrust

$$v_\mathrm{t}= \sqrt{\frac{2mg}{\rho A C_\mathrm{d} }}$$

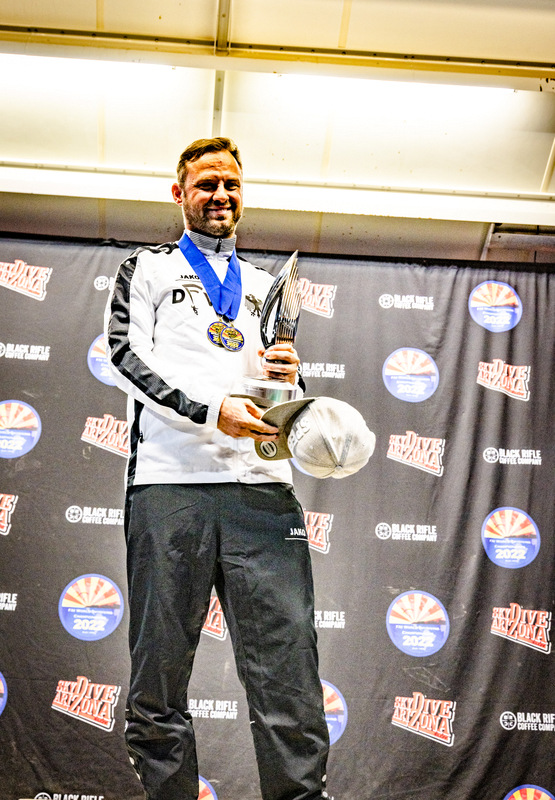
Marco Hepp, 2022 world champion speed skydiving, with the Tim Mace Trophy

where

- m is the mass of the falling object
- g is the acceleration due to gravity (9.8 m/s^{2})
- C_{d} is the drag coefficient (~0.7 for head down position, ~1 for belly-to-earth position)
- ρ is the density of the fluid through which the object is falling (1.23 kg/m^{3} for air at sea level, and ~0.99 kg/m^{3} at the middle of the measurement zone (2200m))
- A is the projected area of the object, or area cross-section (~0.18 m^{2} for head down position, ~0.7 for belly-to-earth position)

So, for a human in belly-to-earth position (A = 0.7 m^{2}, m = 90 kg, C_{d} = 1) this gives 50.6 m/s, about the terminal velocity of the typical skydiver of 55 m/s.

The skydiver cannot increase their mass easily enough to significantly increase terminal velocity, and the skydiver's area cross-section is limited by their helmet and shoulders in a head-down dive position. The most significant difference comes from the skydiver reducing their coefficient of friction. The head-down body position has to be carefully managed to be as streamlined as possible, while special helmets and slick body suits reduce skin friction, which is a function of surface area and texture. The shape and rigidity of the suits also have to be designed to minimize the coefficient of drag. Finally, a skydiver must reach their maximum speed at as high an altitude as possible so that the density of air is at a minimum.

== Weather ==
Weather can have an extraordinary effect on a competition as well as individual divers. In the event of bad weather or air traffic circumstances, the exit altitude is lowered. In addition, cloud conditions may cause a cancellation of a jump.

== See also ==
- Alan Eustace
- Felix Baumgartner
