= CF =

The Latin tag cf., much used in text books, means 'compare'.

CF, Cf, cf and similar may refer to:

== Arts and entertainment ==
- "Commercial film", the term for a television advertisement in South Korea
- Captain Flamingo, a Canadian animated television series
- Christopher Forgues, an artist and musician based in Providence, Rhode Island, United States; known as C.F.

== Computing ==
- .cf, the Top-Level Domain for Central African Republic
- .NET Compact Framework, a version of the .NET Framework for mobile and embedded devices
- Adobe ColdFusion, a web application development platform
- Collaborative filtering, a method of making predictions by collecting information from many users
- CompactFlash, a type of memory card
- Compact Floppy, a variation of floppy disk
- Consolidation function, in computer science
- Core Foundation, a C application programming interface in Mac OS X
- Coupling Facility, an IBM mainframe feature
- CurseForge, a website offering mods for various video games
- Cloudflare, an American technology company

== Science and technology ==
- Haplogroup CF (Y-DNA)
- Carbon monofluoride, a solid material
- Carbon fibers, a fiber made of carbon, typically used in carbon fibers composites
- Californium, symbol Cf, a chemical element
- Climate and Forecast Metadata Conventions, for Earth science data
- Conductivity factor, the level of dissolved salts in a solution
- Conflat, a type of vacuum flange
- Cystic fibrosis, a hereditary multisystem autosomal recessive disease
- Capacity factor, a ratio of an actual electrical energy output of a power plant over a period of time to the maximum possible electrical energy output.

== Places ==
- CF postcode area, for Cardiff and Mid Glamorgan (United Kingdom) post codes
- Central African Republic, 2-letter ISO country code
- Central Falls, a city in Rhode Island, United States
- Chinatown Fair, a video arcade in Brooklyn, New York, United States

== Sports ==
- Canopy formation, a discipline in parachuting
- Center fielder, a defensive position in baseball
- Centre forward, an attacking position in Association football
- Football club (Club de Fútbol) in Spain
- Corsi For, a statistic used in the ice hockey

== Other uses ==
- Cadillac Fairview, a Canadian commercial real estate owner and management company
- Canadian Forces, Canada's military
- Casino Filipino, a casino chain in the Philippines
- Cedar Fair, a defunct American amusement park company
- Chaplain to the Forces, post-nominal initials for army chaplains
- Citizens First, political party in Zambia
- Clinton Foundation, a nonprofit corporation established by former President of the United States Bill Clinton
- Cohesion Fund, one of the European Structural and Investment Funds of the European Union
- Consolidated Freightways, an American trucking company that operated from 1929 to 2002
- Companion, an Order of Fiji
- CF Industries (NYSE stock ticker symbol CF)
