= Terminal velocity =

Highest velocity attainable by a falling object

The downward force of gravity (F_{g}) equals the restraining force of drag (F_{d}) plus the buoyancy. The net force on the object is zero, and the result is that the velocity of the object remains constant.

Terminal velocity is the maximum speed attainable by an object as it falls through a fluid (air is the most common example). It is reached when the sum of the drag force (F_{d}) and the buoyancy is equal to the downward force of gravity (F_{G}) acting on the object. Since the net force on the object is zero, the object has zero acceleration. For objects falling through air at normal pressure, the buoyant force is usually dismissed and not taken into account, as its effects are negligible.

As the speed of an object increases, so does the drag force acting on it, which also depends on the substance it is passing through (for example air or water). At some speed, the drag or force of resistance will be equal to the gravitational pull on the object. At this point the object stops accelerating and continues falling at a constant speed called the terminal velocity (also called settling velocity).

An object moving downward faster than the terminal velocity (for example because it was thrown downwards, it fell from a thinner part of the atmosphere, or it changed shape) will slow down until it reaches the terminal velocity. Drag depends on the projected area, here represented by the object's cross-section or silhouette in a horizontal plane.

An object with a large projected area relative to its mass, such as a parachute, has a lower terminal velocity than one with a small projected area relative to its mass, such as a dart. In general, for the same shape and material, the terminal velocity of an object increases with size. This is because the downward force (weight) is proportional to the cube of the linear dimension, but the air resistance is approximately proportional to the cross-section area which increases only as the square of the linear dimension.

For very small objects such as dust and mist, the terminal velocity is easily overcome by convection currents which can prevent them from reaching the ground at all, and hence they can stay suspended in the air for indefinite periods. Air pollution and fog are examples.

== Examples ==
Graph of velocity versus time of a skydiver reaching a terminal velocity.

Based on air resistance, for example, the terminal speed of a skydiver in a belly-to-earth (i.e., face down) free fall position is about 55 m/s (180 ft/s). This speed is the asymptotic, limiting value of the speed, and the forces acting on the body balance each other more and more closely as the terminal speed is approached. In this example, a speed of 50.0% of terminal speed is reached after only about 3 seconds, while it takes 8 seconds to reach 90%, 15 seconds to reach 99%, and so on.

Higher speeds can be attained if the skydiver pulls in their limbs (see also freeflying). In this case, the terminal speed increases to about 90 m/s (300 ft/s), which is almost the terminal speed of the peregrine falcon diving down on its prey. The same terminal speed is reached for a typical .30-06 bullet dropping downwards—when it is returning to the ground having been fired upwards or dropped from a tower—according to a 1920 U.S. Army Ordnance study.

Competition speed skydivers fly in a head-down position and can reach speeds of 150 m/s (490 ft/s). The current record is held by Felix Baumgartner who jumped from an altitude of 38,887 m (127,582 ft) and reached 380 m/s (1,200 ft/s), though he achieved this speed at high altitude where the density of the air is much lower than at the Earth's surface, producing a correspondingly lower drag force.

The biologist J. B. S. Haldane wrote,

To the mouse and any smaller animal [gravity] presents practically no dangers. You can drop a mouse down a thousand-yard mine shaft; and, on arriving at the bottom, it gets a slight shock and walks away. A rat is killed, a man is broken, a horse splashes. For the resistance presented to movement by the air is proportional to the surface of the moving object. Divide an animal's length, breadth, and height each by ten; its weight is reduced to a thousandth, but its surface only to a hundredth. So the resistance to falling in the case of the small animal is relatively ten times greater than the driving force.

== Physics ==
For terminal velocity in falling through air, where viscosity is negligible compared to the drag force, and without considering buoyancy effects, terminal velocity is given by
$$V_t= \sqrt\frac{2 m g}{\rho A C_d}$$
where

- $V_t$ represents terminal velocity,
- $m$ is the mass of the falling object,
- $g$ is the acceleration due to gravity,
- $C_d$ is the drag coefficient,
- $\rho$ is the density of the fluid through which the object is falling, and
- $A$ is the projected area of the object.

In reality, an object approaches its terminal speed asymptotically.

Buoyancy effects, due to the upward force on the object by the surrounding fluid, can be taken into account using Archimedes' principle: the mass $m$ has to be reduced by the displaced fluid mass $\rho V$, with $V$ the volume of the object. So instead of $m$ use the reduced mass $m_r = m-\rho V$ in this and subsequent formulas.

The terminal speed of an object changes due to the properties of the fluid, the mass of the object and its projected cross-sectional surface area.

Air density increases with decreasing altitude, at about 1% per 80 metres (260 ft) (see barometric formula). For objects falling through the atmosphere, for every 160 metres (520 ft) of fall, the terminal speed decreases 1%. After reaching the local terminal velocity, while continuing the fall, speed decreases to change with the local terminal speed.

Using mathematical terms, defining down to be positive, the net force acting on an object falling near the surface of Earth is (according to the drag equation):

$$F_\text{net} = m a = m g - \frac{1}{2} \rho v^2 A C_d,$$

with v(t) the velocity of the object as a function of time t.

At equilibrium, the net force is zero (F_{net} = 0) and the velocity becomes the terminal velocity lim_{t→∞} v(t) = V_{t}:

$$m g - {1 \over 2} \rho V_t^2 A C_d = 0.$$

Solving for V_{t} yields:

$V_t = \sqrt\frac{2mg}{\rho A C_d}.$	5

The drag equation is—assuming ρ, g and C_{d} to be constants:
$$m a = m \frac{\mathrm{d}v}{\mathrm{d}t} = m g - \frac{1}{2} \rho v^2 A C_d.$$

Although this is a Riccati equation that can be solved by reduction to a second-order linear differential equation, it is easier to separate variables.

A more practical form of this equation can be obtained by making the substitution α^{2} = ρAC_{d}/2mg.

Dividing both sides by m gives
$$\frac{\mathrm{d}v}{\mathrm{d}t} = g \left( 1 - \alpha^2 v^2 \right).$$

The equation can be re-arranged into
$$\mathrm{d}t = \frac{\mathrm{d}v}{g ( 1 - \alpha^2 v^2)}.$$

Taking the integral of both sides yields
$$\int_0^t {\mathrm{d}t'} = {1 \over g}\int_0^v \frac{\mathrm{d}v'}{1-\alpha^2 v^{\prime 2}}.$$

After integration, this becomes
$$t - 0 = {1 \over g}\left[{\ln(1 + \alpha v') \over 2\alpha} - \frac{\ln(1 - \alpha v')}{2\alpha} + C \right]_{v'=0}^{v'=v} ={1 \over g} \left[{\ln \frac{1 + \alpha v'}{1 - \alpha v'} \over 2\alpha} + C \right]_{v'=0}^{v'=v}$$

or in a simpler form
$$t = {1 \over 2\alpha g} \ln \frac{1 + \alpha v}{1 - \alpha v} = \frac{\mathrm{artanh}(\alpha v)}{\alpha g},$$
with artanh the inverse hyperbolic tangent function.

Alternatively,
$$\frac{1}{\alpha}\tanh(\alpha g t) = v,$$
with tanh the hyperbolic tangent function. Assuming that g is positive (which it was defined to be), and substituting α back in, the speed v becomes
$$v = \sqrt\frac{2mg}{\rho A C_d} \tanh \left(t \sqrt{\frac{g \rho A C_d }{2m}}\right).$$

Using the formula for terminal velocity
$$V_t = \sqrt\frac{2mg}{\rho A C_d}$$
the equation can be rewritten as
$$v = V_t \tanh \left(t \frac{g}{V_t}\right).$$

As time tends to infinity (t → ∞), the hyperbolic tangent tends to 1, resulting in the terminal speed
$$V_t = \lim_{t \to \infty} v(t) = \sqrt\frac{2mg}{\rho A C_d}.$$

Creeping flow past a sphere: streamlines, drag force F_{d} and force by gravity F_{g}

For very slow motion of the fluid, the inertia forces of the fluid are negligible (assumption of massless fluid) in comparison to other forces. Such flows are called creeping or Stokes flows and the condition to be satisfied for the flows to be creeping flows is the Reynolds number, $Re \ll 1$. The equation of motion for creeping flow (simplified Navier–Stokes equation) is given by:

$${\mathbf \nabla} p = \mu \nabla^2 {\mathbf v}$$

where:

- $\mathbf v$ is the fluid velocity vector field,
- $p$ is the fluid pressure field,
- $\mu$ is the liquid/fluid viscosity.

The analytical solution for the creeping flow around a sphere was first given by Stokes in 1851. From Stokes' solution, the drag force acting on the sphere of diameter $d$ can be obtained as

$D = 3\pi \mu d V \qquad \text{or} \qquad C_d = \frac{24}{Re}$	6

where the Reynolds number, $Re = \frac{\rho d}{\mu} V$. The expression for the drag force given by equation (6) is called Stokes' law.

When the value of $C_d$ is substituted in the equation (5), we obtain the expression for terminal speed of a spherical object moving under creeping flow conditions:

$$V_t = \frac{g d^2}{18 \mu} \left(\rho_s - \rho \right),$$
where $\rho_s$ is the density of the object.

== Applications ==
The creeping flow results can be applied in order to study the settling of sediments near the ocean bottom and the fall of moisture drops in the atmosphere. The principle is also applied in the falling sphere viscometer, an experimental device used to measure the viscosity of highly viscous fluids, for example oil, paraffin, tar etc.

== Terminal velocity in the presence of buoyancy force ==
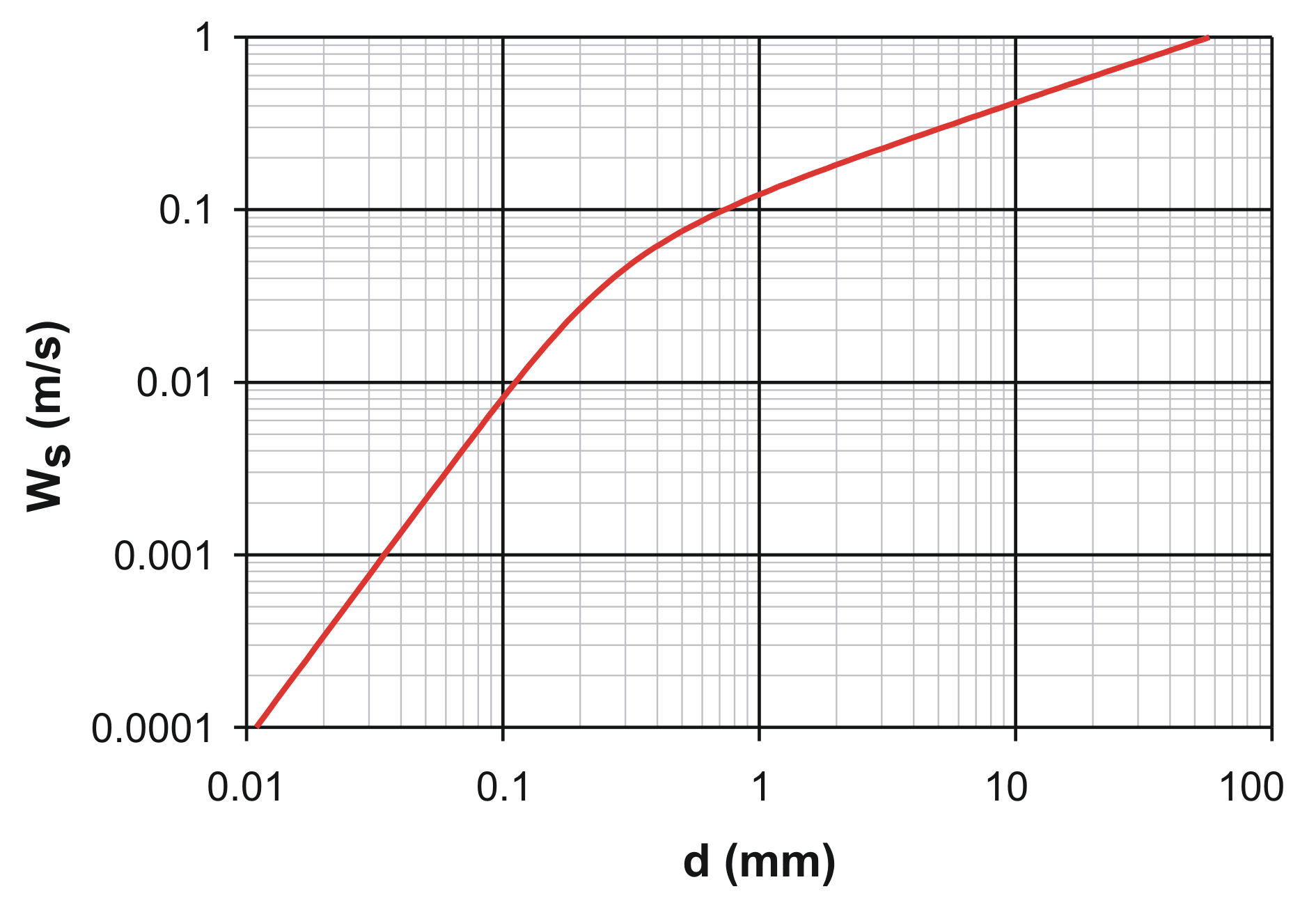
Settling velocity W_{s} of a sand grain (diameter d, density 2650 kg/m^{3}) in water at 20 °C, computed with the formula of Soulsby (1997).

When the buoyancy effects are taken into account, an object falling through a fluid under its own weight can reach a terminal velocity (settling velocity) if the net force acting on the object becomes zero. When the terminal velocity is reached the weight of the object is exactly balanced by the upward buoyancy force and drag force. That is

$W = F_b + D$	1

where

- $W$ is the weight of the object,
- $F_b$ is the buoyancy force acting on the object, and
- $D$ is the drag force acting on the object.

If the falling object is spherical in shape, the expression for the three forces are given below:

$W = \frac{\pi}{6} d^3 \rho_s g,$	2

$F_b = \frac{\pi}{6} d^3 \rho g,$	3

$D = C_d \frac{1}{2} \rho V^2 A,$	4

where

- $d$ is the diameter of the spherical object,
- $g$ is the gravitational acceleration,
- $\rho$ is the density of the fluid,
- $\rho_s$ is the density of the object,
- $A = \frac{1}{4} \pi d^2$ is the projected area of the sphere,
- $C_d$ is the drag coefficient, and
- $V$ is the characteristic velocity (taken as terminal velocity, $V_t$).

Substitution of equations (2–4) in equation (1) and solving for terminal velocity, $V_t$ to yield the following expression

$V_t = \sqrt{\frac{4 g d}{3 C_d} \left( \frac{\rho_s - \rho}{\rho} \right)}.$	5

In equation (1), it is assumed that the object is denser than the fluid. If not, the sign of the drag force should be made negative since the object will be moving upwards, against gravity. Examples are bubbles formed at the bottom of a champagne glass and helium balloons. The terminal velocity in such cases will have a negative value, corresponding to the rate of rising up.

== See also ==
- Stokes's law
- Terminal ballistics
