= Big-ways =

Type of skydiving

A big way is a type of formation skydiving involving a large group of skydivers coming together while in freefall to form a specific and predetermined formation. All the skydivers involved aim to connect with each other and hold the complete formation for a designated period (a number of seconds).

A sequential skydive would involve multiple formations. Grips between individual skydivers can be on any part of the hand/arm or legs. The jumpsuits worn are specifically designed with handle-like grips to assist.

== Size ==
The number of skydivers needed for a formation skydive to be considered a "big way" is often a contentious issue. It often depends on what is considered normal at each dropzone. For a small dropzone operating only a small Cessna aircraft that seats 5 people, anything over 5 may be considered "big". However, for dropzones with aircraft that take more people, 6 would be considered small. There are courses available for skydivers to train to jump on formations of 100 or greater.

The largest formation ever built was the 400-way created and held over Udon Thani, Thailand on February 8, 2006.

== Locations ==
Big-way formation skydiving takes place all over the world, at many dropzones. For a large formation (fifty plus) the skydivers can be a group gathered from around the country, or in many cases the world, bringing together their expertise, extreme effort and drive to meet a challenge.

Team Awesome is an example of an international big-way skydiving club with members from many countries, traveling around the world to participate in big-way skydiving.
