= CFS =

CFS may refer to:

== Organizations ==
- Canadian Federation of Students
- Canadian Forest Service
- Center for Financial Studies, a research institute affiliated with Goethe University Frankfurt, Germany
- Center for Subjectivity Research, a research institute affiliated with the University of Copenhagen, Denmark
- Centre for Food Safety, the food safety authority of the Hong Kong government
- Child and family services, a government or non-profit organisation
- Christian Family Solutions, a Christian non-profit social service agency headquartered in Germantown, Wisconsin, US
- Citizens for Sunshine, an Ohio, US nonprofit promoting access to public records
- Committee on World Food Security, in the United Nations System
- Commonwealth Fusion Systems, an American fusion energy company
- Co-operative Financial Services, former name of a UK-based banking and insurance company
- Conservative Future Scotland, the youth branch of the Scottish Conservative Party
- Corpo Forestale dello Stato, the Italian state forestry department
- Craigmillar Festival Society, a former community organisation in Edinburgh, Scotland
- Craniofacial Society of Great Britain and Ireland
- South Australian Country Fire Service, a volunteer firefighting service

=== Central Flying Schools ===
- Central Flying School, a Royal Air Force training establishment
- Central Flying School RAAF, a Royal Australian Air Force training establishment
- Central Flying School RNZAF, a Royal New Zealand Air Force unit
- Central Flying School SAAF, a flight school of the South African Air Force

== Places ==
- Canadian Forces Station, a military installation of the Canadian Armed Forces
- Congo Free State, a recognized national entity in central Africa 1885–1908
- Côte française des Somalis, the French Somaliland

== Transportation ==
- Citywide Ferry Service, a commuter ferry in New York City, US
- Coffs Harbour Airport (IATA airport code), Australia
- Empire Airlines (ICAO code: CFS), originally named Clearwater Flying Service
- Sartigan Railway (French: Chemin de fer Sartigan), a short-line railway in Quebec, Canada
- Syrian Railways (French: Chemins de fer syriens), the Syrian state railway system

== Science and technology ==
- Causal fermion systems, a fundamental physics theory
- Chromosomal fragile site, a part of the chromosome prone to breakage
- Chronic fatigue syndrome, a chronic illness now mainly called myalgic encephalomyelitis/chronic fatigue syndrome
- Climate Forecast System (NCEP) or coupled forecast system, a weather prediction and climate model
- Cold-formed steel, a goods manufacturing technique
- Continuous flash suppression, adapted version of flash suppression
- Cubic feet per second (cfs or CFS), a unit of fluid flow rate

=== Computing ===
- Clustered file system, a file system which is shared by being simultaneously mounted on multiple servers
- Completely Fair Scheduler, a Linux operating system scheduler
- Continuous flow system, printer ink feeding via tubes and bottles
- Culler-Fried System, one of the first interactive computer systems

== Other uses ==
- Call for service, an incident that emergency services are assigned to resolve
- Canada Flight Supplement, a publication
- Certificat de formation à la sécurité, the French national degree required to be flight attendant in France
- Certified Finance Specialist, a professional certification
- Chicken-fried steak or country fried steak
- Consolidated financial statement
- Microsoft Combat Flight Simulator (CFS1), a game
