= Perris Valley Airport =

- IATA: none; ICAO: none

Summary
- Airport type: Private
- Owner: Ben & Diane Conatser
- Operator: Ben & Diane Conatser
- Serves: Riverside County, California
- Location: Perris, California
- Elevation AMSL: 1,413 ft / 431 m
- Coordinates: 33°45′52.7″N 117°13′8.4″W
- Interactive map of Perris Valley Airport

Runways
Direction	Length		Surface
Direction	ft	m	Surface
15/33	5,100	1,554	Asphalt

Statistics (2004)
- GA flights: 34,200
- Skydives: 130,000
- FAA data Perris Valley Skydiving

Perris Valley Airport (FAA LID: L65) is a privately owned and operated airport open to public use and located one mile (1.6 km) southeast of Perris, serving Riverside County, California, United States. It has one runway and is used for general aviation and extensive skydiving. The airport operates from dawn to dusk daily year-round.

== Facilities ==
Perris Valley Airport has one runway:

- Runway 15/33: 5,100 feet (1,600 m) x 50 feet (15 m). Surface: asphalt.

The airport does not have a control tower, runway lights, or approach lights. The Federal Aviation Administration (FAA) classifies the northern 1,900 feet (580 m) section of runway in poor condition. FAA inspectors determined the remaining 3,200 feet (980 m) section of runway is in good condition. The northern 1,000 feet (300 m) is closed indefinitely. Aircraft maintenance and repair services are available. The airport provides aviation fuel to the general public only on an emergency basis. The airport is home to 125 ultralight aircraft and 16 conventional aircraft. Conventional aircraft include ten single engine planes, five twin engine planes, and one jet aircraft.

The primary occupant is Skydive Perris. A skydiving drop zone operates at the airport, and skydivers land about 50 feet from the runway. Skydiving operations run from early morning to dusk daily unless limited by weather or safety factors. Skydive Perris operates a fleet of six aircraft, consisting of a Skyvan, a Super 300 Twin Otter, two Super Twin Otters, a Pilatus Porter and a twin engine DC-9 jet. The DC-9 is the only civilian jet FAA-certified for skydiving.

Skydivers fly to jump altitude (13,000 feet) in about 12 minutes.

== Accidents and incidents ==
- On 4 May 1985, Douglas DC-3C N157U of Perris Valley Paracenter was damaged beyond economic repair when the port engine lost a propeller blade on take-off, causing the engine to be torn from its mountings. There were no injuries among the two crew and 31 parachutists on board. A mandatory Airworthiness Directive had been issued concerning the propeller, but an investigation found no evidence that it had been complied with.
- On April 22, 1992, a skydiving aircraft lost engine power during takeoff and crashed. The plane never climbed more than 50 feet above the runway. There were 22 on board, sixteen of whom (two pilots and 14 skydivers, including 2 Dutch nationals) died in the crash. Two other Dutch skydivers survived, as did three Americans and a South African. The National Transportation Safety Board (NTSB) attributed engine failure to aviation fuel contaminated by improper fuel handling. The pilots' response to engine failure also contributed to the crash. Apparently there was a design flaw in the Otter that facilitated accidental beta configuration of the propellers in an emergency situation. In a flight simulator, shortly after the crash, two other very experienced and current Otter pilots did the same thing as the pilot on the ill-fated flight.
- On 24 May 2017, a de Havilland Canada DHC-6 Twin Otter crashed on landing after a skydiving flight. The pilot and trainee pilot were uninjured but the right wing was torn from the aircraft..
