= Projected area =

Two-dimensional area measurement of a three-dimensional object projected onto a plane

Example of a projected area from a hardness indentation.

Projected area is the area measurement of a three-dimensional object by projecting its silhouette on to an arbitrary plane. This is often used in mechanical engineering and architectural engineering related fields, especially for hardness testing, axial stress, wind pressures, and terminal velocity.

The geometrical definition of a projected area is the rectilinear parallel projection of a surface of any shape onto a plane:
$$A_\text{projected} = \int_{A} \cos{\beta} \, dA$$
where A is the original area, and $\beta$ is the angle between the normal to the local plane and the line of sight to the surface A. For basic shapes the results are listed in the table below.

Projected area for basic shapes
Shape	Area	Projected area
Flat rectangle	$A = L \times W$	$A_\text{proj} = L \times W \cos{\beta}$
Circular disc	$A = \pi r^2$	$A_\text{proj} = \pi r^2 \cos{\beta}$
Sphere	$A = 4 \pi r^2$	$A_\text{proj} = \frac{A}{4} = \pi r^2$

== See also ==
- Cross-sectional area
- Surface area
