= Citizens for Fire Safety =

Citizens for Fire Safety (CFFS) was a nonprofit based out of Sacramento, California, California that advocated for usage of chemical fire retardants in household furniture. After investigation by the Chicago Tribune released in May of 2012, Citizens For Fire Safety was discovered to be a front group, with intention to utilize lobbying and congressional testimonies to reduce the regulatory pressure regarding the production of flame retardant products. The group was shut down in 2012.

== History ==
CFFS was founded in 2007 by chemical manufacturers Albemarle Corporation, Chemtura Corp. and ICL Industrial Products (Hawthorne/Roe), together which controlled over 40% of the flame retardants' world market. CFFS stated goal was "protecting the United States with the highest standards of fire safety, through a coalition of fire professionals, educators, burn centers, doctors, fire departments and industry leaders." The former executive director of CFFS, Grant David Gilham, was a legislative staffer and veteran political consultant. The group's funding was obtained through membership dues and assessments, particularly from chemical manufacturing corporations. Between the years of 2008 and 2010, CFFS' total funding was about $17 million.

== Objectives ==
One of the main objectives of CFFS was to fight anti-chemical state legislature. To accomplish this, CFFS hired doctors and burn experts to testify in state senates against anti-chemical bills. In 2011, burn expert Dr. David Heimbach testified in front of the California State Senate. The bill which Dr. Heimbach testified against proposed a restriction on fire retardant chemicals in household furniture. Dr. Heimbach told a detailed story of an infant who was severely burned from a fire started by a candle. The infant was asleep on a pillow which lacked flame retardant chemicals. This testimony was later discovered to be fabricated, as state records showed no evidence of any fire or infant mortality due to a candle fire. Further investigation revealed two additional testimonies from Dr. Heimbach in 2009 and 2010 which detailed infant deaths from fires were also fabricated.

== Investigation ==
In 2012, the Chicago Tribune conducted an investigation in which they discovered that flame retardants’ producer companies were distorting scientific studies related to their toxic chemicals. The companies were stating that the substances were beneficial for society in general, since, for example, according to researches, “they give people a 15-fold increase in time to escape fires,” and also “they prevent residential fires and save lives.” The chemicals, however, were very dangerous substances and also associated with a series of health issues to humans, such as cancer, developing problems, neurological deficits and impaired fertility. What happened was a “grossly distorted” of the scientific true, with twisted research results and misinterpretations of reality. The goal was to influence lawmakers regarding the production of flame retardants.

The Chicago Tribune's investigation revealed that CFFS was created by chemical companies with the intention of "promoting common business interests of members involved with the chemical manufacturing industry," identifying them as an industry front group.

== Testing mattresses ==
In 2012, three different brands of baby mattresses were found to have toxic flame retardants and contained possible carcinogens, as tested by laboratories for the Chicago Tribune. The mattresses were distributed in stores such as Babies R Us, Foundations, and Angeles. Linda Birnbaum, director of the federal government's National Institute of Environmental Health Sciences, said "If these chemicals are in your child's mattress, they are going to be constantly exposed."

CFFS supported finding a solution to this issue, and proposed that mattresses must pass federal fire-safety tests that are far more stringent. The results found by the Tribune were that all the mattresses were imported from China. However, none of the mattresses contained any amounts of chlorinated Tris. With regards to the tests from the manufactures of the mattresses, the results varied.

Companies were quick to defend themselves against the accusations. In a statement from Summer Infant Inc., one of the manufactures for Babies R Us, stated "Simply put, the statements made are misleading and reckless in that they imply a health hazard that doesn't actually exist." Dr. Jerome Paulson, a pediatrician from George Washington University, stated to the Tribune regarding children alone that "because they are smaller than adults and their bodies are still developing, children face greater risks from exposure to toxic chemicals."
