= Citizens for Sunshine =

U.S. nonprofit organization

Citizens for Sunshine is a nonprofit organization based in Akron, Ohio, that seeks to improve compliance with Ohio's Public Records Act.

The organization was started in 2007 by a former newspaper reporter with a passion for public records who began filing pro se lawsuits against police departments and other public offices who refused to release records he had requested. Although most of the cases are settled out of court, at least one has resulted in a ruling from the Ohio Court of Appeals, which found that the police and law department in Rocky River, Ohio, had clearly violated state law when they refused to make records available to him.

Most notably, the suits included a lawsuit against Marc Dann, then the attorney general of Ohio, for access to e-mails between Dann and his scheduler, with whom he was believed to be carrying on an extramarital affair.

== See also ==
- Public records
- Sunshine Week
