= Parachuting =

Descent using a parachute, especially as an air sport

- A skydiver with an open canopy.
- Highest governing body: Fédération Aéronautique Internationale

Characteristics
- Contact: No
- Mixed-sex: Yes
- Type: Air sports

Presence
- Country or region: Worldwide
- Olympic: No
- World Games: 1997 – 2022

Parachuting is the descent of a person through the atmosphere using a parachute. In sport parachuting, a jumper normally exits an aircraft, passes through a period of free fall, deploys a steerable canopy, flies it to a landing area and lands. Skydiving is commonly used as a synonym for sport parachuting, although it can more narrowly refer to controlling the body during freefall before the canopy is deployed.

Parachuting is used for recreation and competition, military deployment, emergency escape and access to remote areas. International competition and record activity is administered by the Skydiving Commission of the Fédération Aéronautique Internationale (FAI).

== History ==
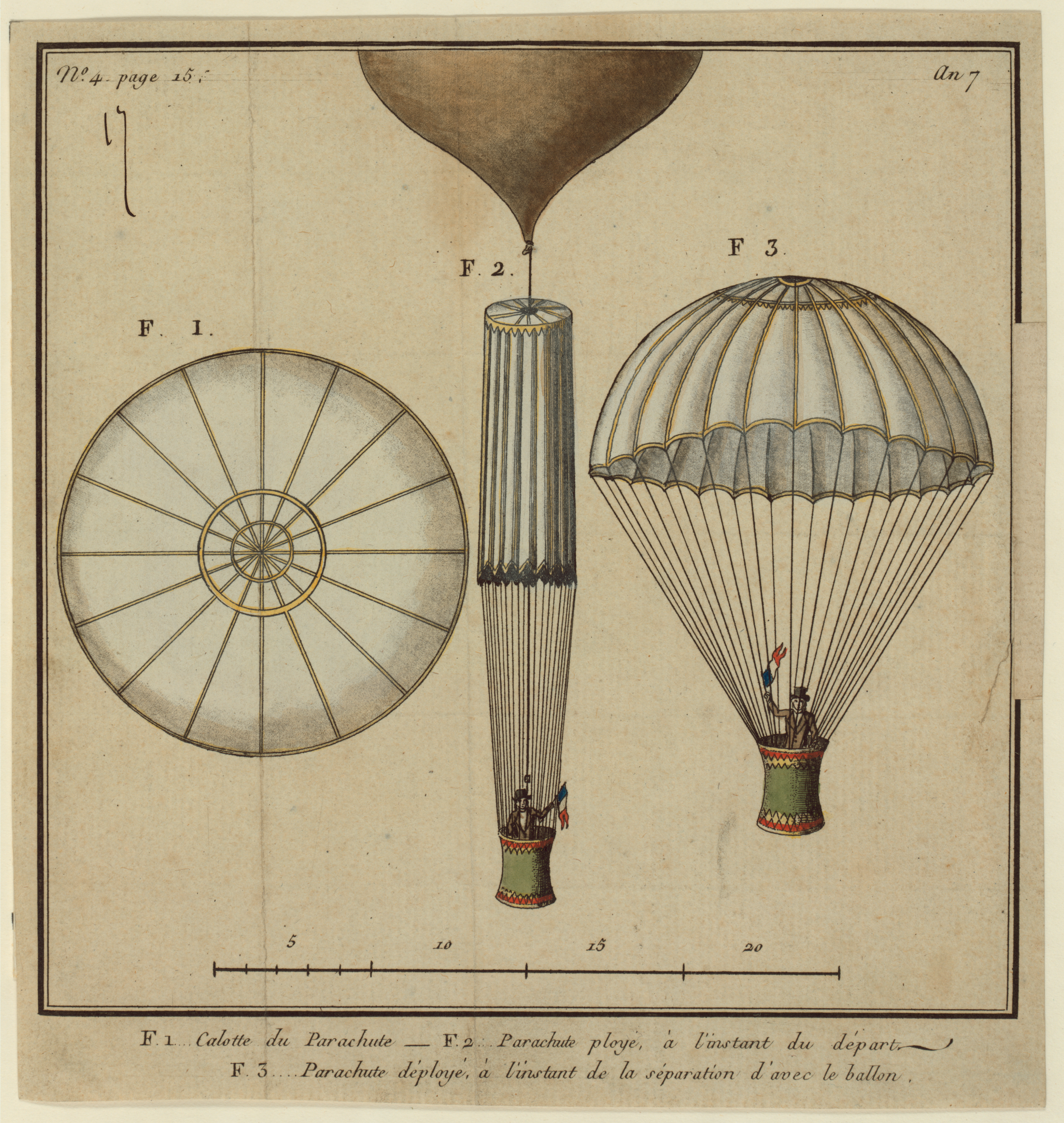
A nineteenth-century illustration of Garnerin's 1797 parachute descent at Parc Monceau

On 22 October 1797, French balloonist André-Jacques Garnerin made the first well documented parachute descent from a balloon over Paris. His silk canopy opened after he separated a basket from the balloon at about 3,000 ft (910 m). Early parachute descents were mainly public demonstrations or emergency experiments. After the development of a manually operated ripcord, Leslie Irvin made an intentional freefall jump from an aeroplane on 28 April 1919.

Sport parachuting expanded after the Second World War. The first World Parachuting Championships were held at Bled in 1951, initially centred on landing accuracy, and the FAI began recognising parachuting records and championships during the same period.

== Uses ==
Sport parachuting includes recreational jumps, training and internationally regulated competition. Military forces use parachutes to deliver personnel and supplies; specialised units also use controllable ram-air canopies for high-altitude freefall insertion. Forest-service smokejumpers parachute to remote wildfires and receive tools, food and water by air drop.

Parachutes have also been used for emergency escape from balloons and aircraft, particularly during the development of military aviation. Sport parachuting, by contrast, is a planned aircraft operation.

== Jump sequence ==
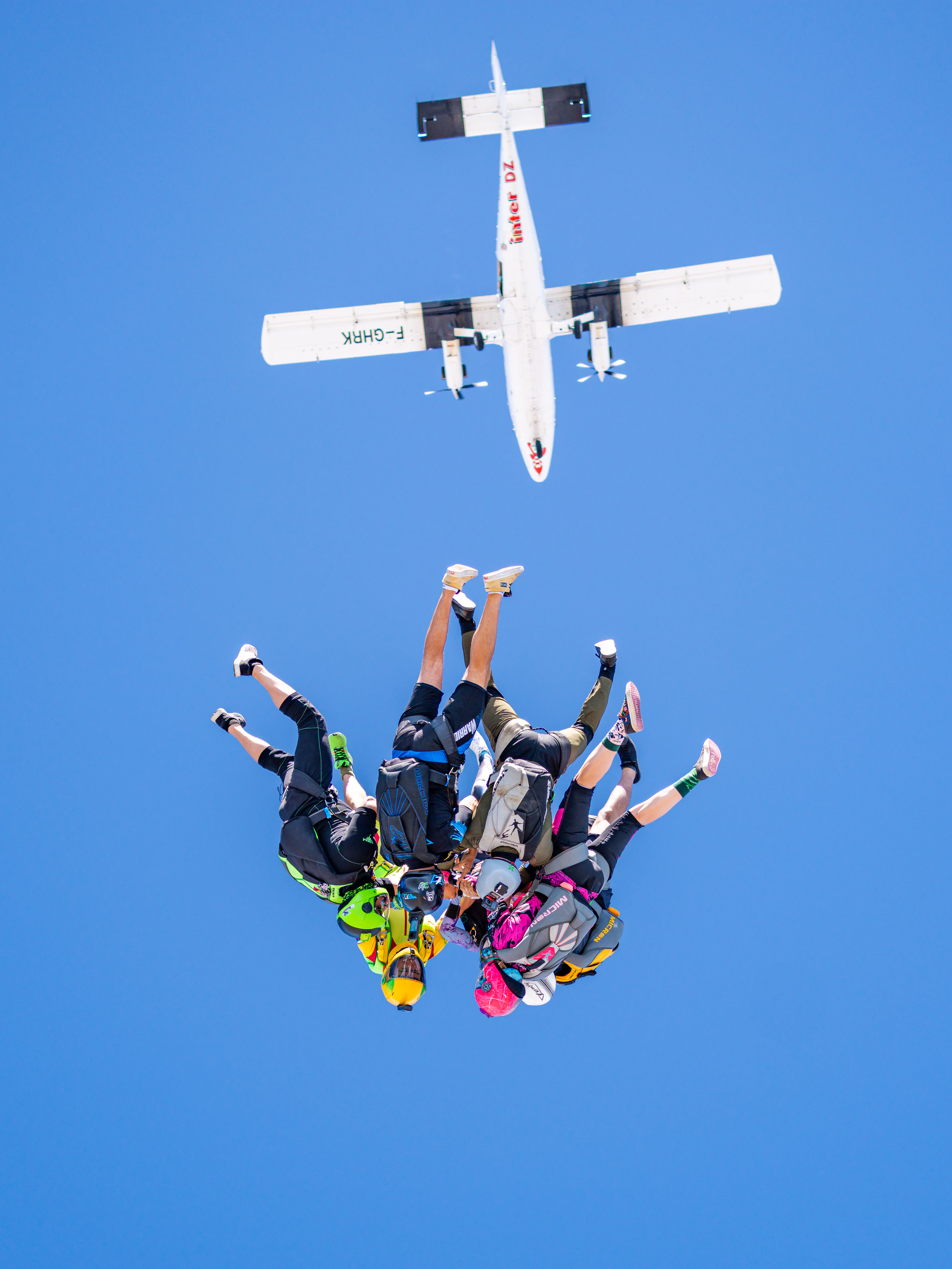
A group of skydivers entering freefall after leaving an aircraft

A sport jump begins with exit from the aircraft. Immediately after exit, the relative wind comes from the direction of aircraft travel and shifts as the jumper's trajectory becomes more nearly vertical. Body position is used to manage this transition, while altitude awareness remains essential throughout freefall.

Freefall is the interval between exit and parachute deployment. In a stable belly-to-earth position, a skydiver reaches a terminal velocity of about 200 km/h (120 mph); head-down and more streamlined body positions produce higher speeds. Body position is used to maintain stability and control orientation during freefall. On formation jumps, participants break off at a planned altitude and track away to create horizontal separation before deploying their parachutes.

Deployment from the pilot chute to full canopy inflation

Deployment is normally initiated by a pilot chute, a small parachute used to initiate or accelerate deployment of the main parachute. Parachute opening can be divided into three stages: activation, deployment—when the parachute leaves its container—and inflation, when the canopy fills with air. Modern sport parachutes are generally ram-air canopies: air entering openings at the front inflates an upper and lower surface into a gliding airfoil.

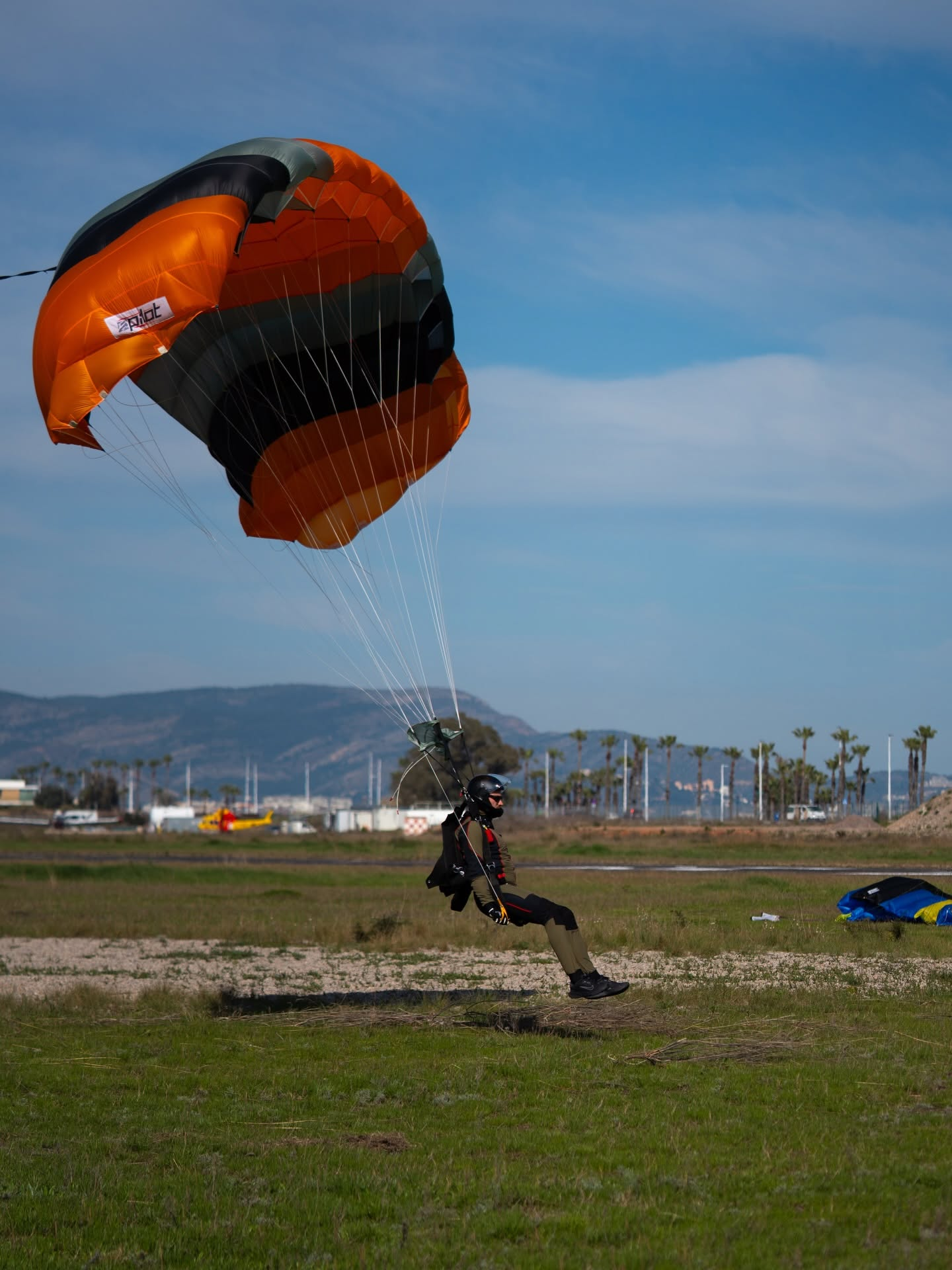
A skydiver flaring the canopy immediately before touchdown

After opening, the jumper checks that the canopy is fully inflated, stable and steerable, and confirms that it can be flared for landing. Steering-toggle inputs change the canopy's heading and speed: pulling one toggle initiates a turn, while pulling both down slows forward motion and descent. Wind affects the canopy's track and speed over the ground, producing slower progress into the wind, faster progress downwind and sideways drift during crosswind flight.

Canopy flight is commonly organised around a holding area and a planned landing pattern while the jumper monitors altitude, position and other canopy traffic. The pattern is a deliberate approach, commonly divided into downwind, base and final legs, that positions the canopy for a straight final descent toward a clear area. If the intended landing area cannot be reached, an alternate open area may be selected.

During final approach, pulling both steering toggles down flares the canopy, decreasing its forward speed and rate of descent before touchdown. When a stand-up landing is not possible, a parachute landing fall can reduce injury risk by distributing the impact across several points of the body.

== Training ==
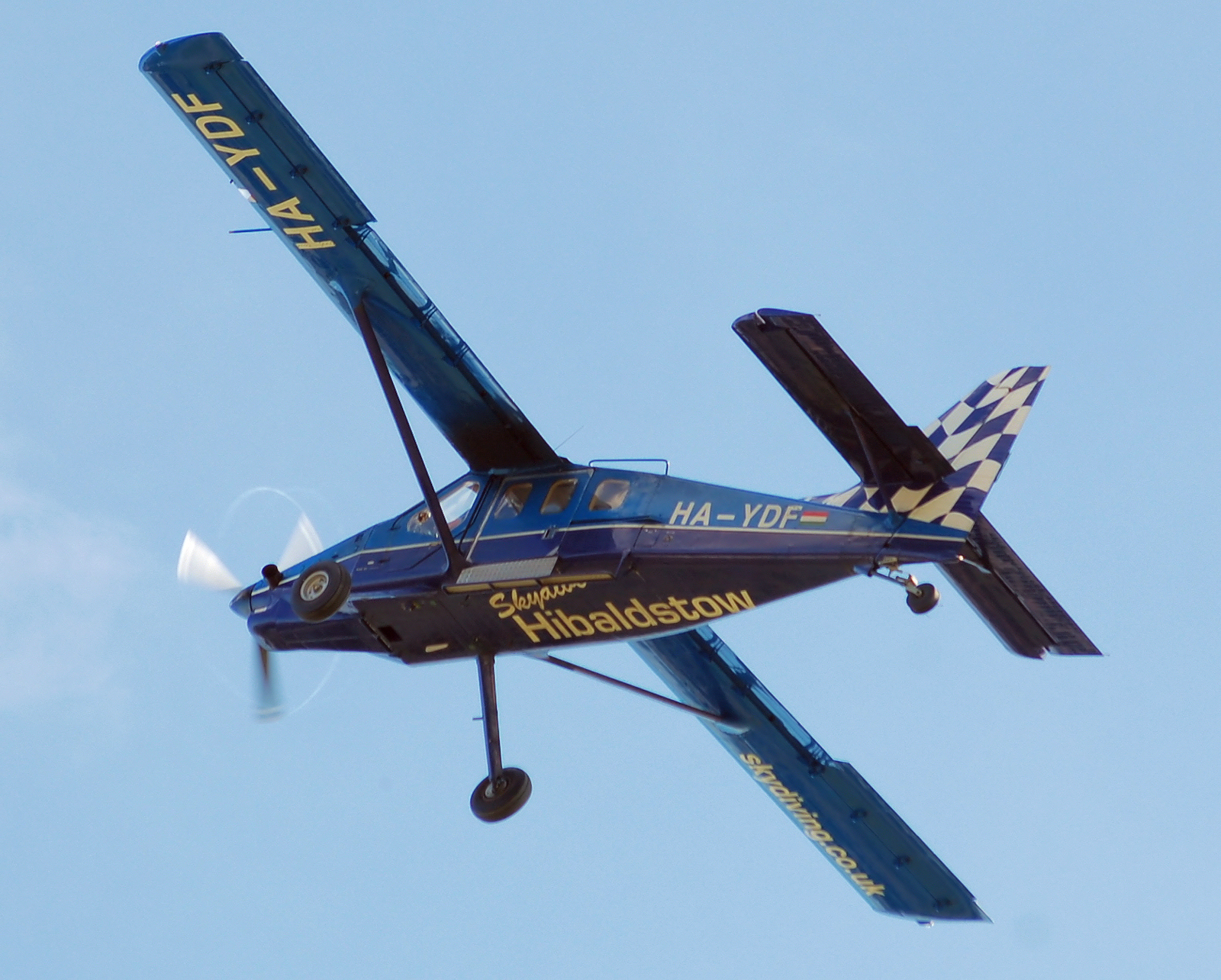
A Technoavia SM92 Finist based at the Hibaldstow skydiving centre in England

Training combines ground instruction with supervised jumps. Subjects normally include equipment, aircraft procedures, exit position, altitude awareness, parachute deployment, emergency procedures, canopy control, landing patterns and landing technique. Training systems differ among countries and national organisations.

In the United States, the United States Parachute Association (USPA) presents tandem, accelerated freefall, instructor-assisted deployment and static-line training within its student programme. British Skydiving uses static-line and accelerated-freefall routes for students progressing toward independent jumping.

=== Tandem ===
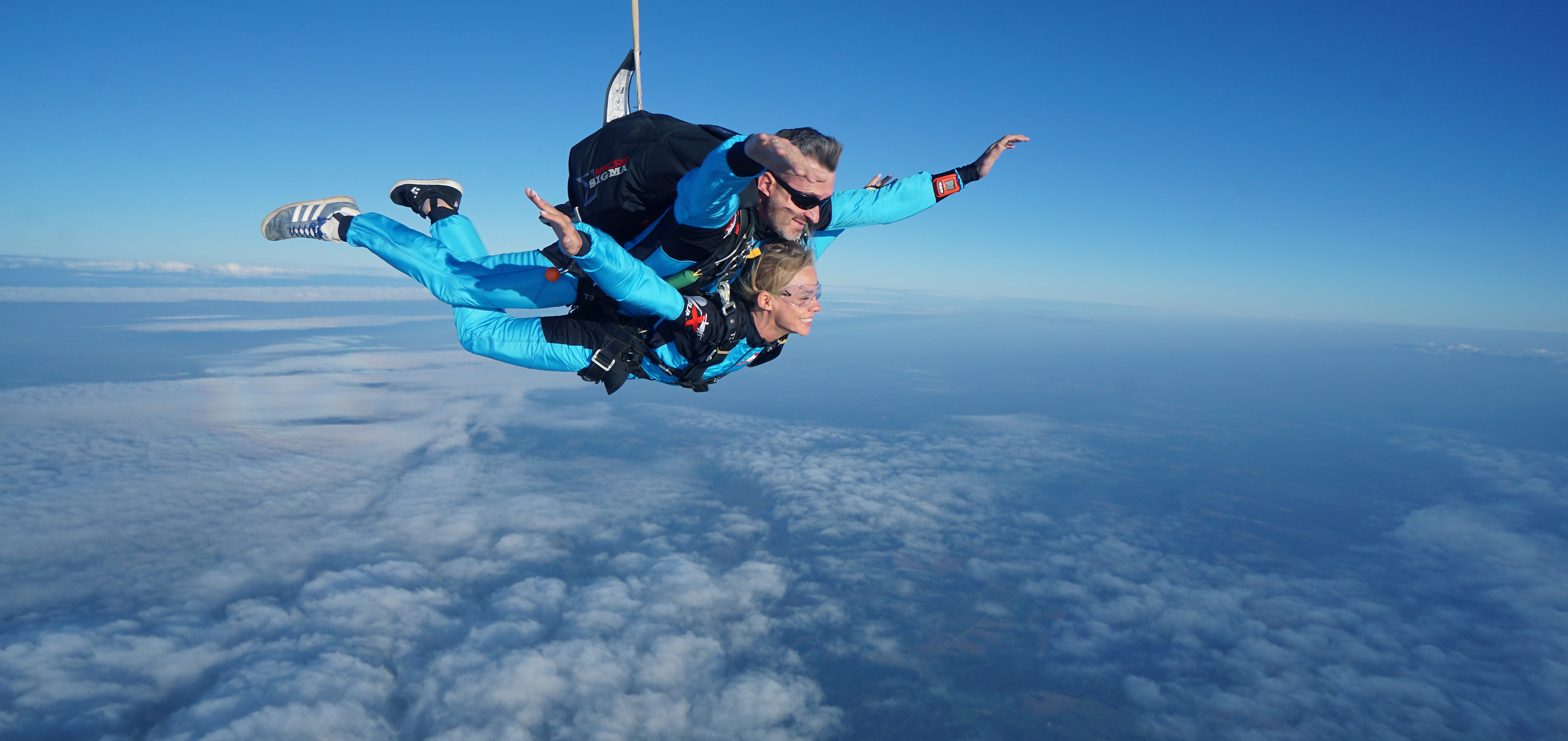
A tandem skydive in freefall over Latvia

In a tandem jump, a student is attached by a separate harness to an instructor, and both use one tandem parachute system. The instructor controls the exit, freefall, deployment, canopy flight and landing. United States regulations require the parachutist in command to meet experience, licensing and system-specific training requirements, and require an operational automatic activation device on the tandem system.

=== Static-line (S/L) progression ===
In static-line training, a line attached to the aircraft initiates deployment as the student exits. The student gradually progresses to self deployment. The deployment delay is then increased until the student reaches terminal velocity. Early jumps therefore place emphasis on aircraft exit, canopy checks, steering, landing patterns and emergency procedures.

=== Instructor-assisted deployment (IAD) ===
Instructor-assisted deployment follows a progression similar to static-line training, but an instructor in the aircraft deploys the student's pilot chute as the student exits. Later jumps introduce independent deployment and longer freefall.

=== Accelerated freefall (AFF) ===
In accelerated freefall, a student exits with one or more instructors who initially hold the student's harness during freefall. The method introduces freefall body control from the first training jumps and progresses toward independent exit, altitude awareness, deployment and canopy flight.

=== Wind tunnels and simulators ===
Vertical wind tunnels can be used to practise body flight without a parachute jump. Indoor skydiving has also developed into a separate competitive sport with formation, artistic and dynamic events.

== Equipment ==
A modern sport system consists of a harness and container holding a main parachute and an approved reserve parachute. It may also include an automatic activation device (AAD), which initiates reserve deployment when preset conditions are detected. Other common equipment includes an altimeter, helmet and goggles.

Equipment regulation varies by jurisdiction. In the United States, civil sport jumpers using a single-person system must have a main canopy, an approved reserve canopy and an approved harness-container system. Reserve parachutes must be packed by a certificated rigger within the applicable interval, and any installed AAD must be maintained according to its manufacturer's instructions. U.S. tandem systems must contain an operational AAD, and the parachutist in command must meet experience, licensing and system-specific training requirements.

== Safety ==
Parachuting involves risk during aircraft operations, freefall, deployment, canopy flight and landing. A 2023 systematic review covering more than 62 million civilian jumps reported an average injury rate of 0.044% and an average fatality rate of 0.0011%. Lower-extremity and lumbar-spine injuries were the most common, and injuries occurred most often during landing.

National statistics are not directly interchangeable because participation, reporting and regulation differ. USPA estimated that its members made 3.47 million jumps in the United States in 2025, with 16 civilian fatalities, or 0.46 deaths per 100,000 jumps. Its member survey also estimated 4,777 reserve uses, about one per 726 jumps, and found that 5.6% of respondents reported an injury requiring medical treatment.

Training, equipment standards and operational rules are intended to reduce risk, but they do not eliminate it. Landing judgement and canopy control remain recurring safety concerns.

== Disciplines and competition ==
International parachuting and skydiving competitions include events performed in freefall, under an open canopy and in vertical wind tunnels. National associations also recognise training and recreational techniques that are not separate FAI championship disciplines.

Skydiving appeared in the air-sports programme of the World Games from 1997 through 2022. Canopy piloting was included from 2005 through 2022, while other skydiving events appeared between 1997 and 2009.

=== Canopy formation ===
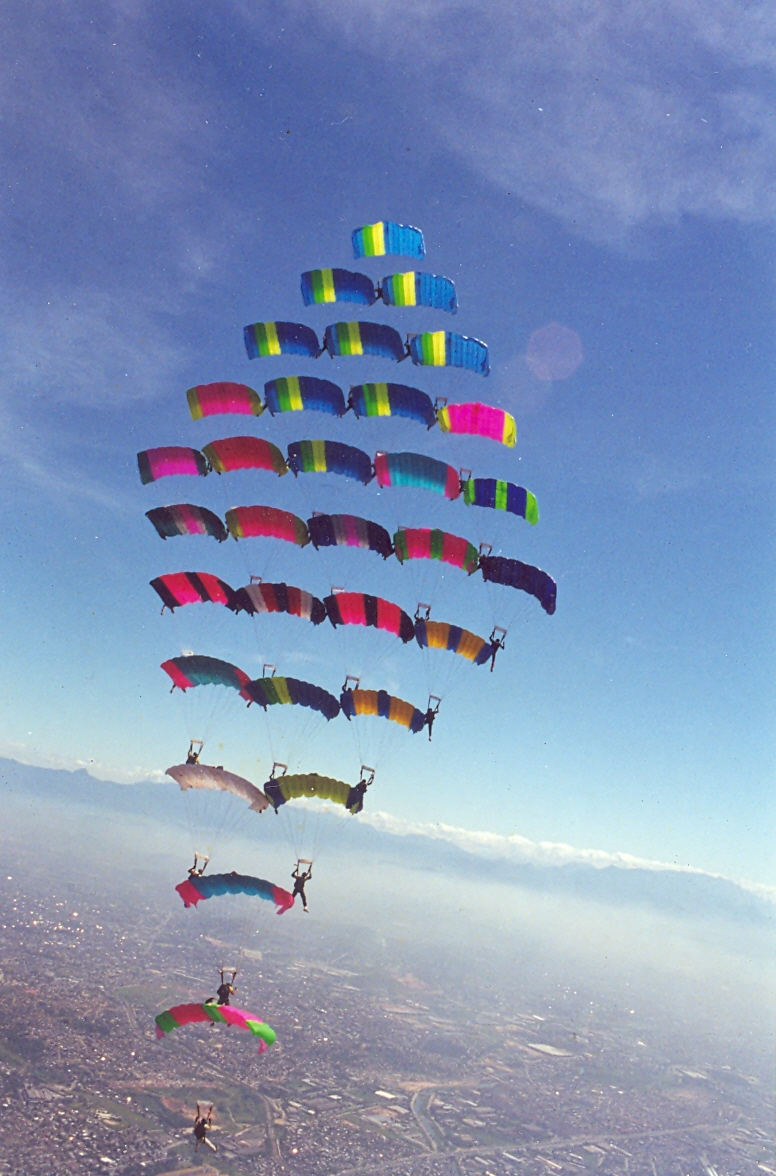
A canopy formation during a 2001 record jump over Rio de Janeiro

In canopy formation, jumpers intentionally fly open parachutes close together and take grips on other canopies or suspension lines. The activity was formerly known as canopy relative work, or CRW (pronounced kro͞o). Basic formations include stacks and planes, in which one jumper docks feet on another canopy's suspension lines or risers.

FAI competition events include 4-way rotations, 4-way sequential and 2-way sequential. Teams repeat prescribed formations during a working period, while a videographer records the jump for judging. Because participants fly in contact with one another's canopies and lines, training includes docking, breakoff and emergency procedures. Entanglements and collapsed canopies are principal hazards, and specialised equipment commonly includes protective clothing and a hook knife.

=== Formation skydiving ===
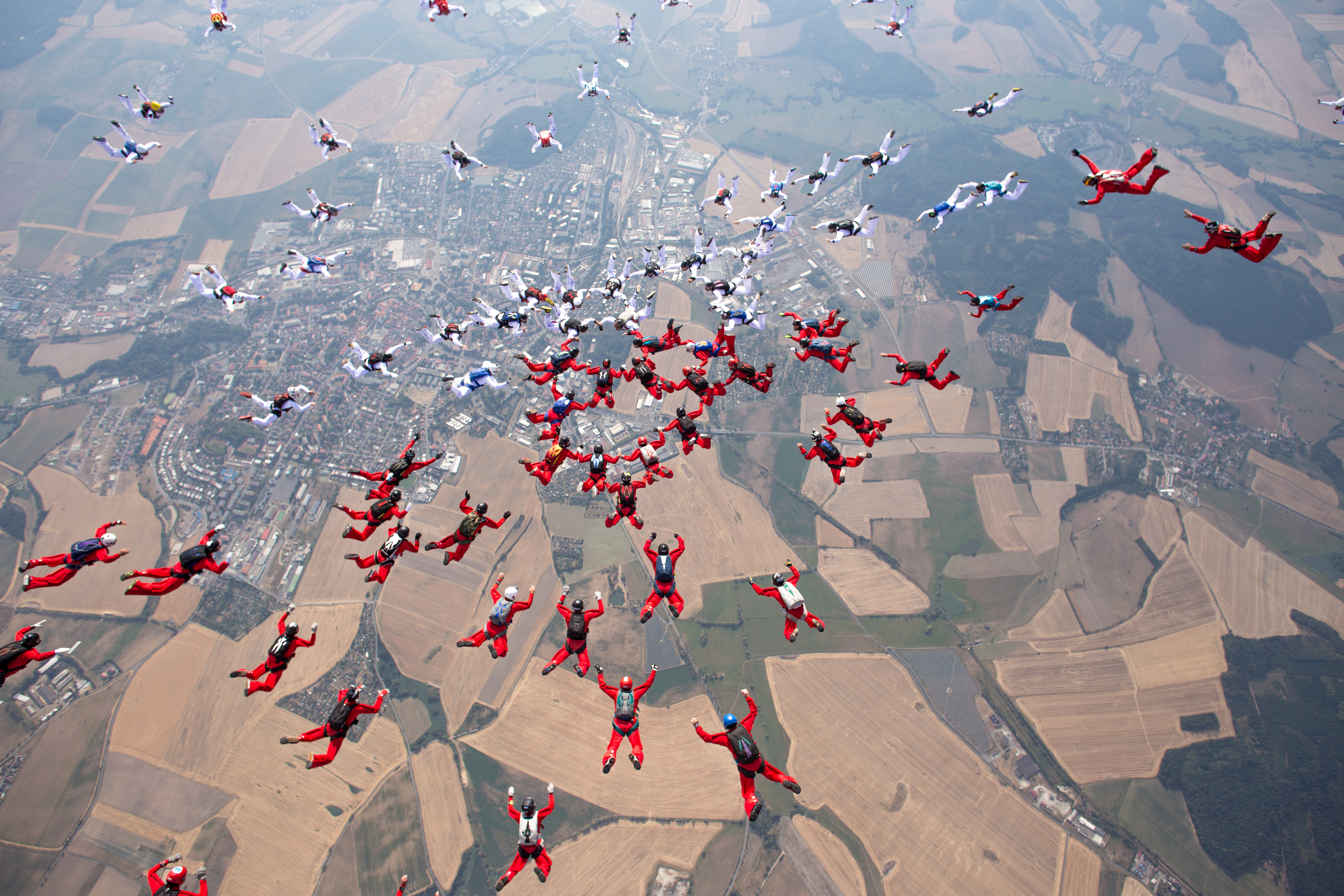
Polish skydivers during a 100-way formation attempt in 2015

Formation skydiving is the intentional manoeuvring of two or more skydivers near one another in freefall to build formations. Participants approach a designated base, take grips and move through planned formations while maintaining a common fall rate and level. Formations may be flown belly-to-earth or vertically, with participants head-down or feet-down. The discipline was traditionally called relative work or group freefall.

In FAI competition, a team normally consists of four or eight performers and a videographer. Each round uses a sequence drawn from an international pool of random formations and blocks. Teams repeat the sequence within a set working time, receiving one point for each correctly completed formation; judging is based on the videographer's recording. Large formations, often called big-ways, may involve dozens or hundreds of participants and are also flown as national or world record attempts under FAI record rules.

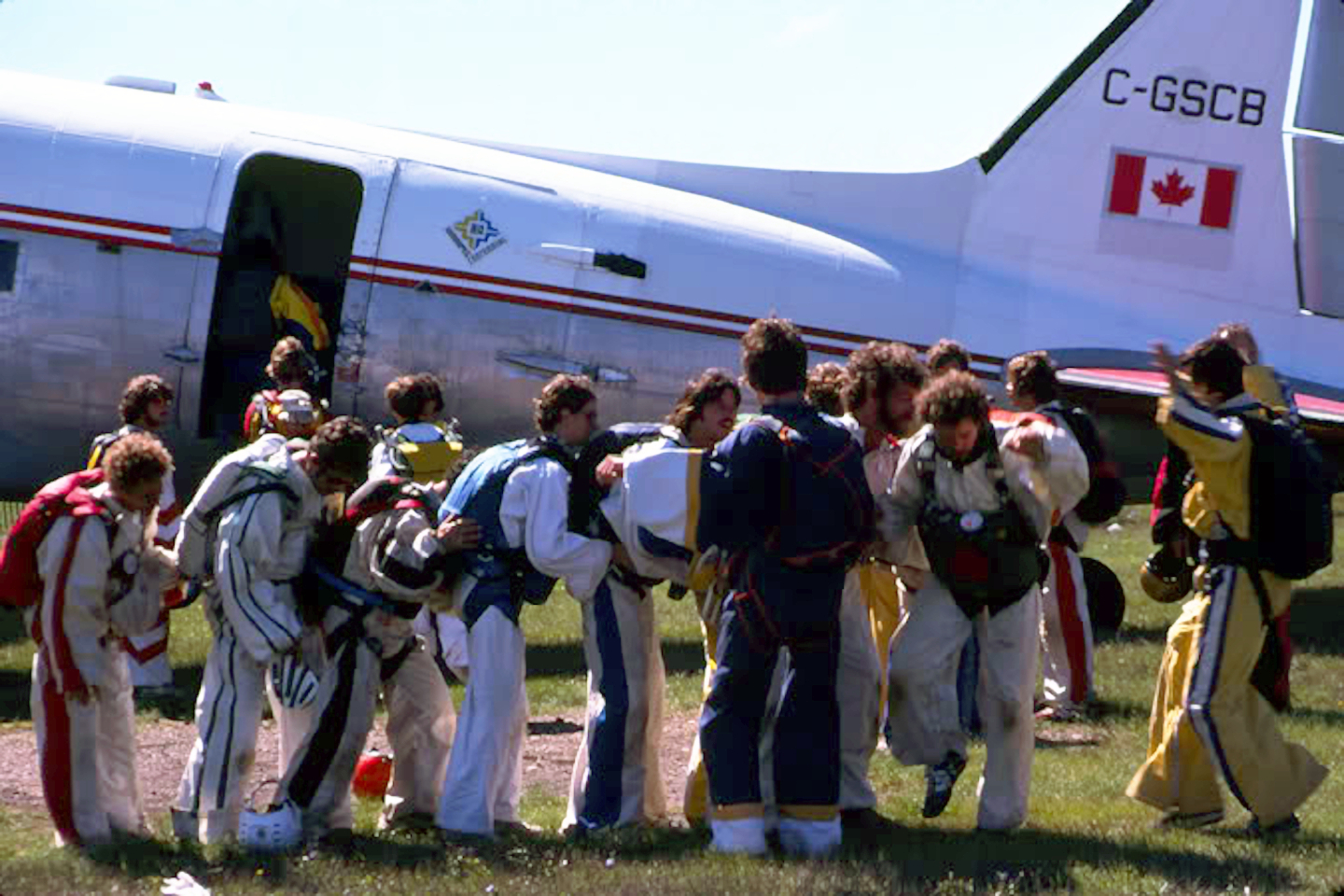
Skydivers rehearse an aircraft exit and planned formation on the ground beside a DC-3 in 1977

Before a formation jump, teams often rehearse the aircraft exit, formation shapes, grips and movement order on the ground, a practice known as a dirt dive. Training commonly begins with small groups and develops stable exits, body position, approach, docking, transition, breakoff and separation skills. Group planning is important because a failed or funnelled formation can bring jumpers into collision, and participants must create horizontal separation before deployment.

=== Freeflying ===
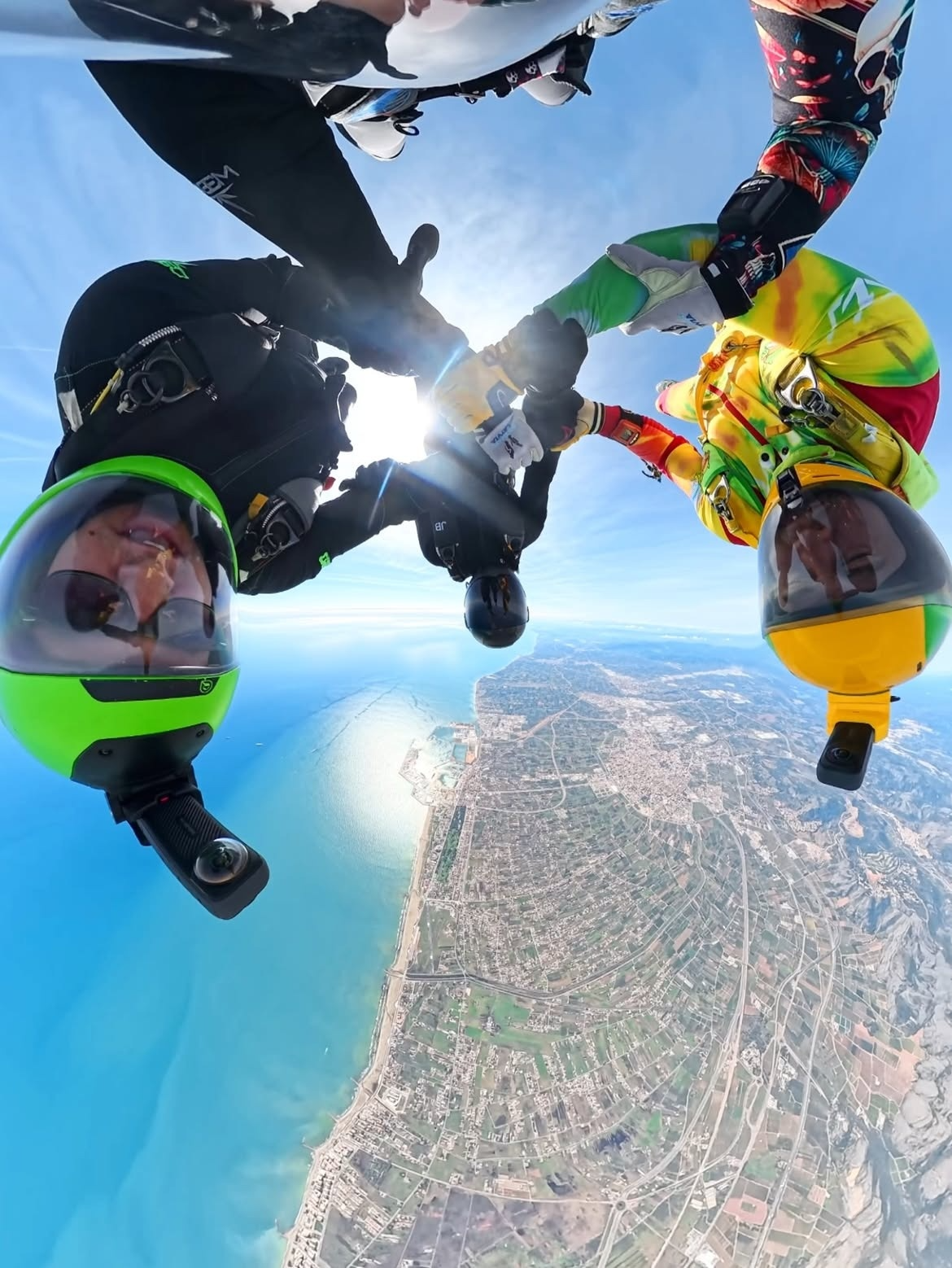
Four skydivers in a head-down freefly formation

Freeflying uses a wider range of body orientations than traditional belly-to-earth skydiving. It includes back flying, sit flying, standing and head-down positions, as well as transitions between them. These orientations can produce high fall rates and rapid changes in relative speed, so group freeflying requires attention to levels, separation, breakoff and altitude awareness.

Beginners generally develop control first in back-flying and head-up positions before attempting sustained head-down flight. Group progression normally begins with a coach and small formations, developing controlled approaches, docking, transitions and separation. Equipment must be secured against premature deployment while the jumper changes orientation at high speed.

Freeflying is also part of FAI artistic competition. Freefly teams consist of two performers and a camera flyer; compulsory and free routines are judged from the camera flyer's footage for technical execution and presentation. The format uses movement around all three axes of the body, unlike traditional flat formation skydiving.

=== Skysurfing ===
In skysurfing, a board is attached to the skydiver's feet for freefall manoeuvres. USPA treats it within its freeflying guidance and recommends a board-release system that can be operated with either hand. Skysurfing was formerly an FAI artistic competition event but was retired from that programme in 2009.

=== Angle flying ===
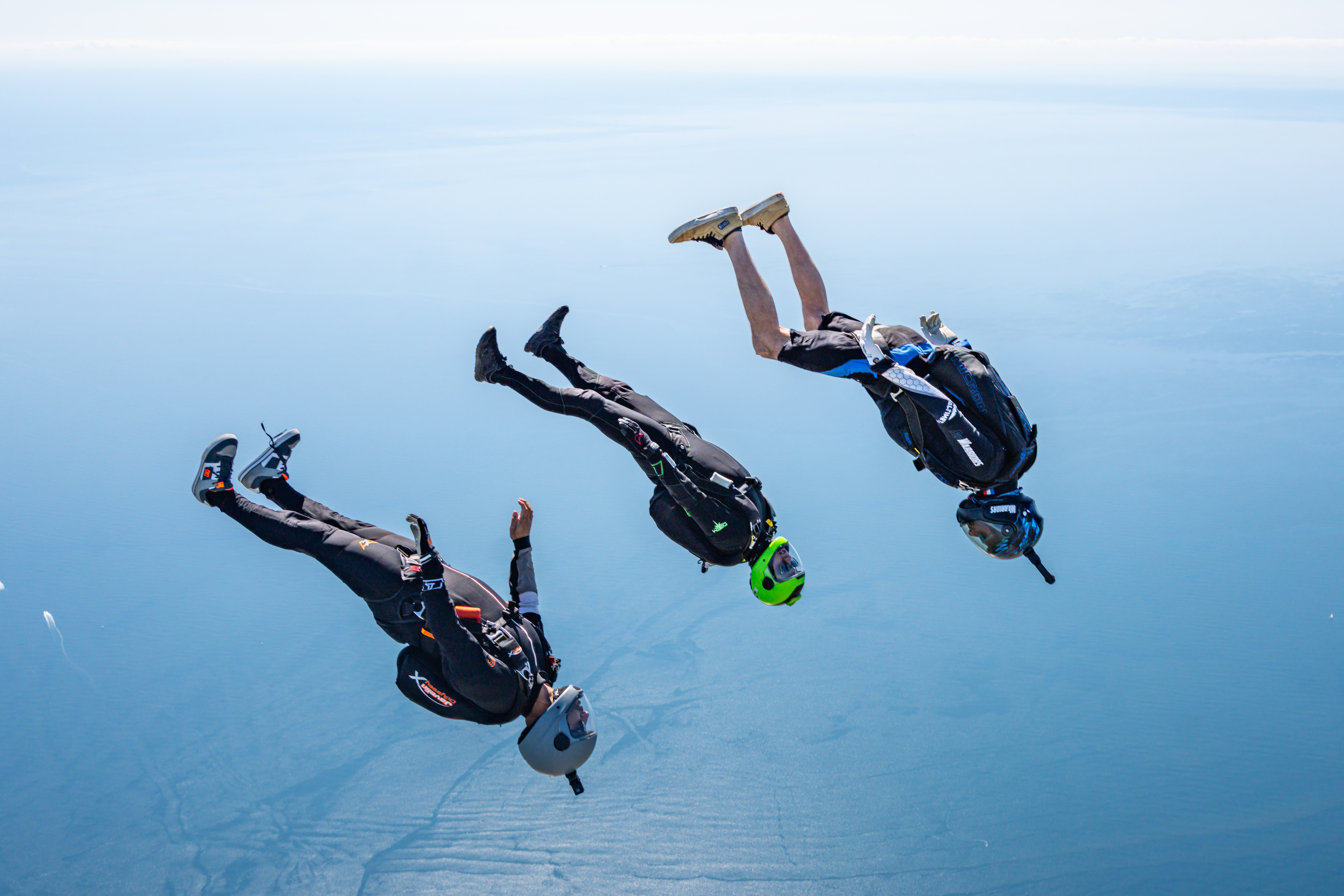
Skydivers in an angle freefall formation

Angle flying is a movement-jump technique in which skydivers follow a diagonal flight path rather than falling straight down. Body orientation can be belly-to-earth or back-to-earth, and group participants aim to maintain a common direction, level and separation.

Tracking is another movement technique in which a skydiver uses a streamlined body position to generate horizontal movement. USPA groups angle flying and tracking as movement jumps rather than separate competition categories.

=== Wingsuit flying ===
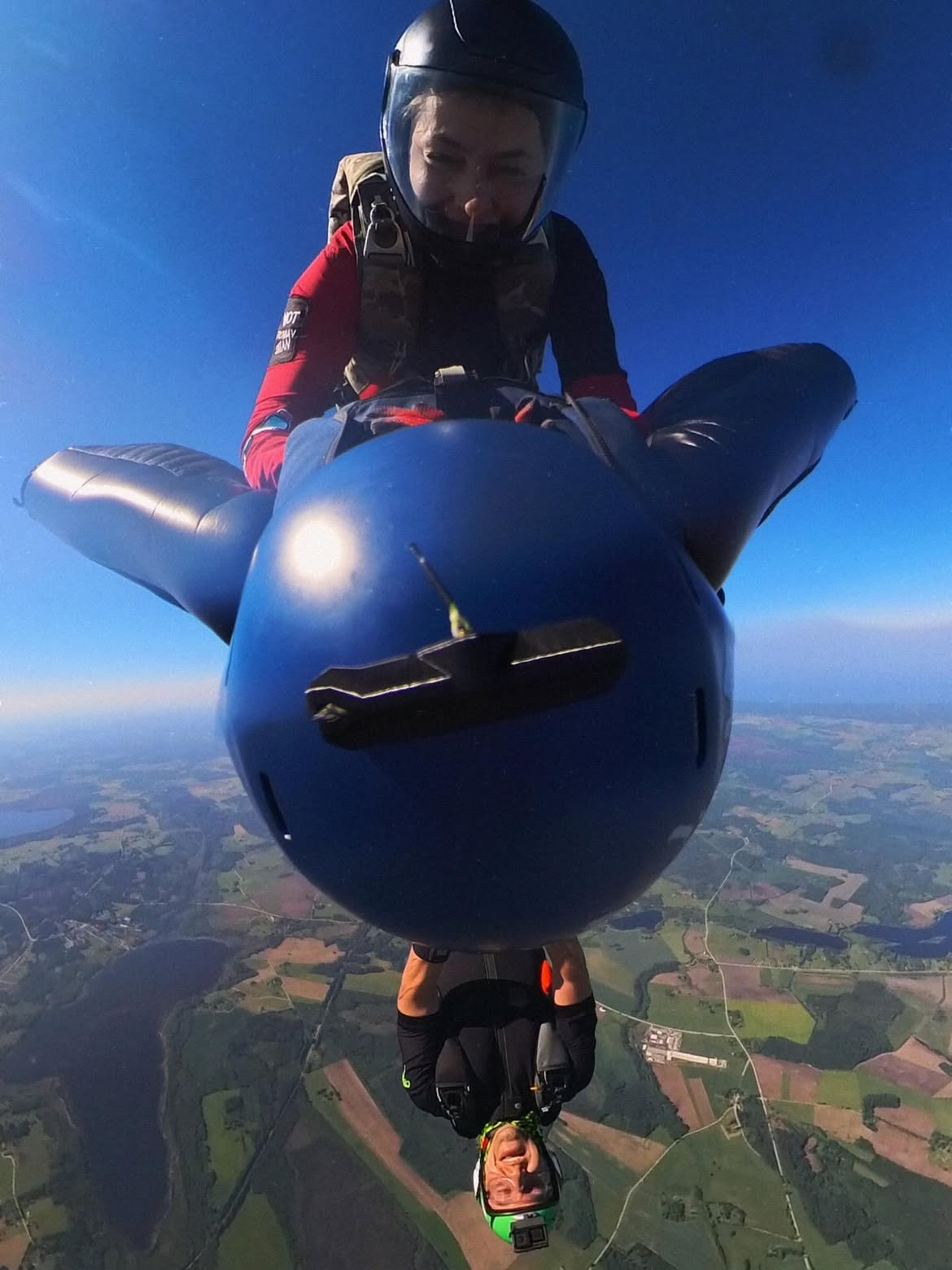
A recreational wingsuit rodeo over Latvia

Wingsuit flying uses a specialised suit with fabric surfaces between the arms and legs. The added surface area reduces vertical speed and increases horizontal speed, while the suit restricts some of the jumper's normal range of motion.

Wingsuit training addresses aircraft exit, flight planning, body position, navigation, breakoff and a deployment technique adapted to the restricted arm movement. USPA requires at least 200 previous skydives and a current licence for a wingsuit jump, and recommends a first-flight course with an experienced wingsuit coach. The suit creates a large wake behind the pilot and can complicate pilot-chute inflation and deployment-bag extraction, so equipment configuration and stable deployment are important parts of progression.

FAI competition recognises performance flying and acrobatic flying. Performance events use GPS measurements for time, horizontal distance and horizontal speed within a defined altitude window. Acrobatic events use two wingsuit performers and a camera flyer, with compulsory figures and free routines involving transitions, docks and coordinated flight.

=== Canopy piloting ===
Canopy piloting uses small, highly manoeuvrable parachutes on courses designed to measure speed, distance, accuracy and freestyle performance. Competition courses are commonly placed over water because of the high approach speeds.

=== Style and accuracy landing ===
In accuracy landing, competitors aim to touch down as close as possible to the centre of a target, and the lowest cumulative distance score wins. In freefall style, an individual competitor performs a prescribed sequence of turns and back loops against the clock. Style and accuracy landing are among the oldest international competition disciplines.

=== Speed skydiving ===
In speed skydiving, competitors seek the highest measured average vertical speed during a defined part of freefall.

=== Paraski and indoor skydiving ===
Paraski combines accuracy landing with alpine giant-slalom skiing. Indoor competition uses vertical wind tunnels for formation, artistic and dynamic events.

== Organizations ==
The FAI Skydiving Commission directs FAI international championships, competitions and record activity, both outdoor and indoor. FAI member countries are represented through a National Air Sport Control, which administers FAI air sports within that country.

National parachuting associations may issue sport licences and instructor ratings, publish training and safety standards, organise domestic competition and represent participants to aviation regulators. Examples include the United States Parachute Association and British Skydiving, the national governing body for sport skydiving in the United Kingdom.

== Drop zones ==
A parachutist landing

A drop zone is a predetermined area on which parachutists or dropped objects land after an intentional parachute jump or drop. In common usage, the term may also refer to the independently operated skydiving centre that provides training and conducts jump operations there.

Parachuting is regulated as an aviation activity. For example, United States rules specify flight visibility and cloud-clearance requirements and prohibit jumps into or through clouds under ordinary operations. Operational planning also considers aircraft procedures, winds, the landing pattern and alternative landing areas.

== Records ==
=== Record free-fall parachute jumps ===
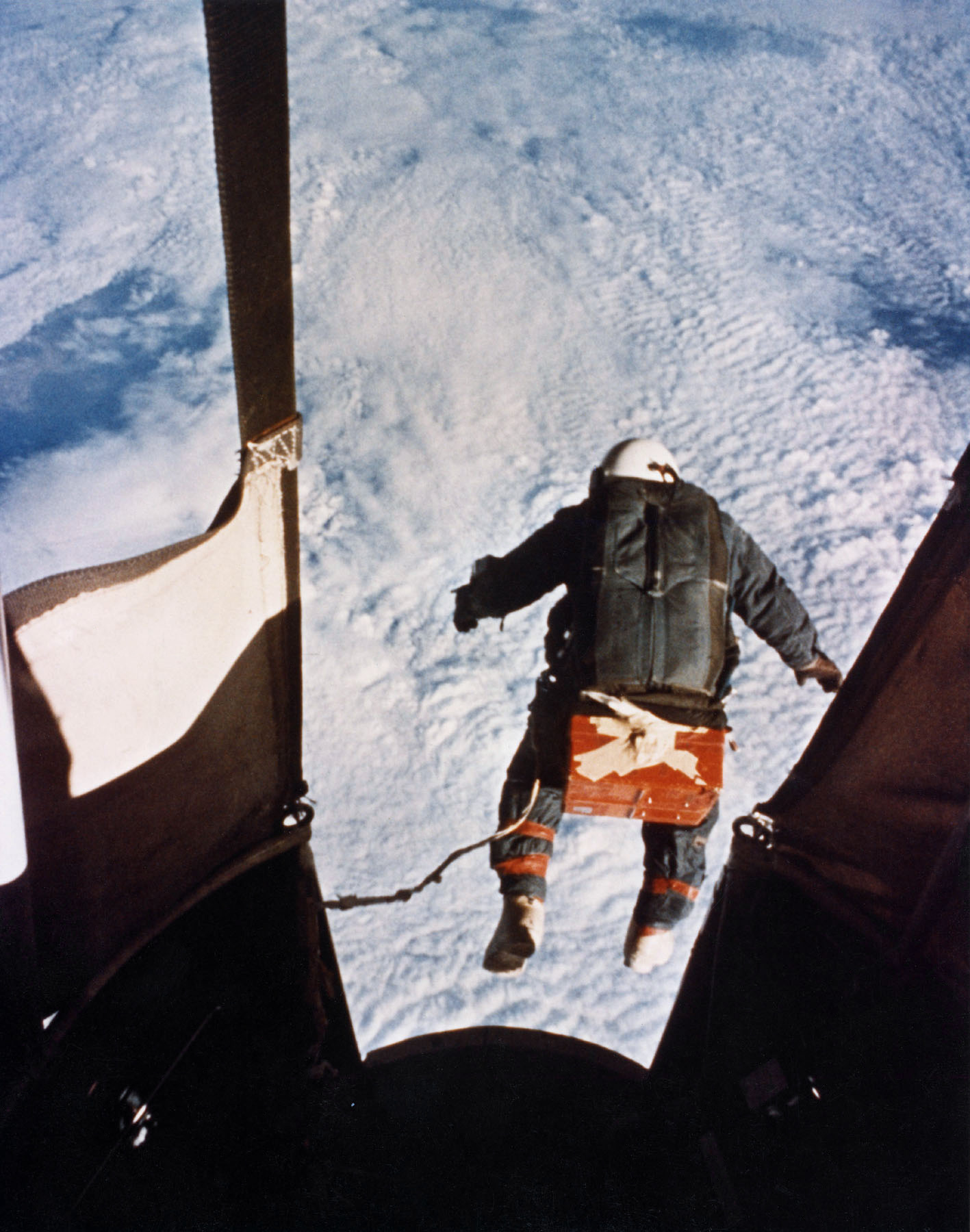
Joseph Kittinger beginning his 1960 high-altitude descent

In 1914, Tiny Broadwick demonstrated a manually deployed parachute after a static line became entangled with an aircraft. The Smithsonian National Air and Space Museum describes the jump as the first planned freefall descent and an early demonstration of the ripcord principle.

During Project Excelsior, U.S. Air Force officer Joseph Kittinger made three high-altitude parachute jumps to test emergency-escape equipment. His first jump, from 23,286 m (76,398 ft) in November 1959, nearly ended fatally when the lines of a stabilising parachute wrapped around his neck; an emergency parachute opened at lower altitude. A second jump followed three weeks later.

On 16 August 1960, Kittinger made the final Excelsior jump from 31,333 m (102,799 ft). He used a stabilising drogue, remained in freefall for 4 minutes 37 seconds and reached more than 965 km/h (600 mph) before deploying his main parachute. A failed pressure-suit glove caused his hand to swell during the flight.

On 1 November 1962, Soviet parachutist Yevgeny Andreyev jumped from a balloon at 25,458 m (83,524 ft) near Saratov and fell 24,500 m (80,400 ft) before opening his parachute. The performance was recognised as an FAI freefall-distance record without a stabilising drogue.

On 14 October 2012, Felix Baumgartner exited above Roswell, New Mexico, at 38,969.4 m (127,852 ft). The FAI ratified records for exit altitude, vertical distance of freefall without a drogue and maximum vertical speed without a drogue; he reached 1,357.6 km/h (843.6 mph).

On 24 October 2014, Alan Eustace raised the FAI exit-altitude record to 41,422 m (135,899 ft) and set records for distance and maximum vertical speed with a drogue.

=== Formation records ===
International parachuting records are registered and ratified by the FAI Skydiving Commission. The current ratified FAI world record for the largest freefall formation is a 400-skydiver formation completed on 8 February 2006 over Udon Thani, Thailand.

On 22 August 2025, 174 skydivers completed a head-down vertical formation at Skydive Chicago in Ottawa, Illinois. USPA reported the performance as a new FAI world record, but as of 19 July 2026 the FAI database listed it as a preliminary record claim rather than a ratified record.

== In popular culture ==
Blood on the Risers is a darkly comic American paratrooper song dating from the Second World War. Sung to the tune of The Battle Hymn of the Republic, it recounts a fatal training jump and became associated with airborne units as a marching cadence and unofficial anthem.

== See also ==
- BASE jumping
- Parachute landing fall
- Parachute rigger
- Paratrooper
- Space diving
