= Canopy formation =

Formation of parachutists in flight

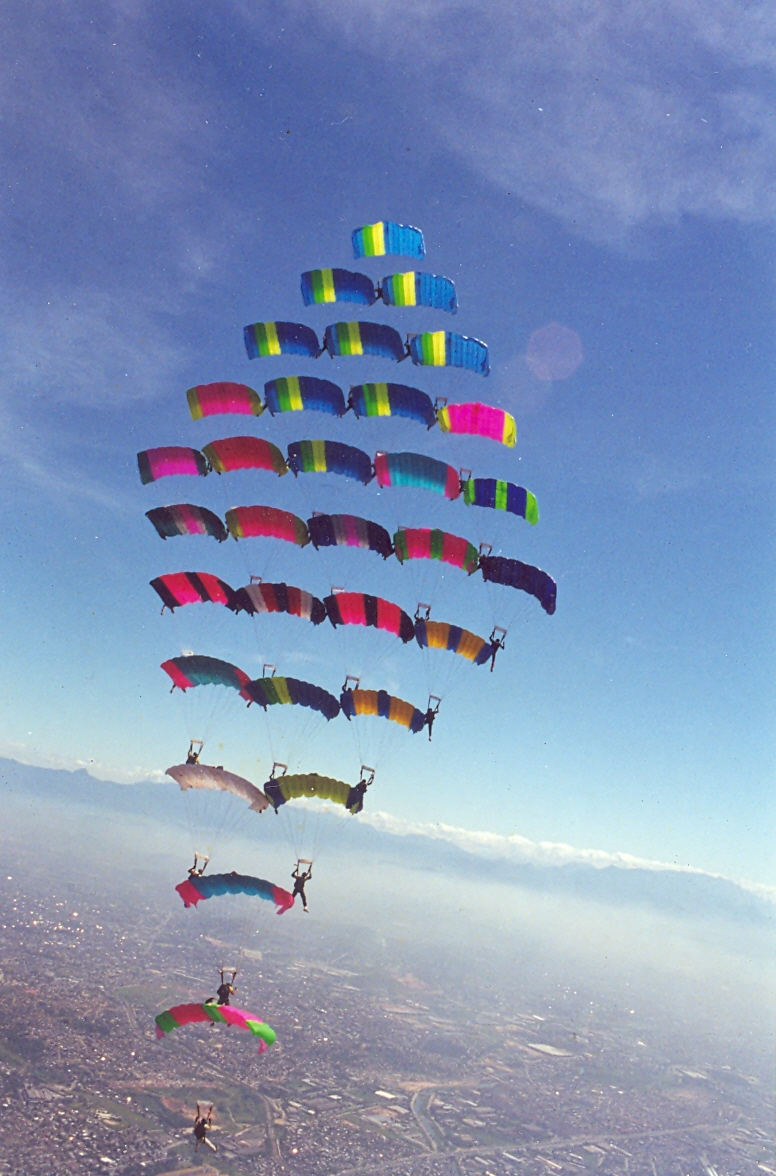
31-way canopy formation (Brazil, 2001)

A canopy formation commonly called Canopy Relative Work or CRW (pronounced kro͞o) is a skydiving discipline where jumpers build canopy formations by intentional manoeuvring two or more canopies in contact to one another during flight.

In 2012, an eleven-member team of the Indian Air Force achieved a canopy formation involving all members of the team. In November 2007, a 100-person was performed over Lake Wales, Florida. To date, this is the largest such formation ever achieved and recognised as an official Fédération Aéronautique Internationale (FAI) World Record. The current FAI European record is a 30-parachute formation built in 2018 in Teuge in the Netherlands

== See also ==
- Formation skydiving
