= Troy Hartman =

Stunt performer (born 1971)

Troy Hartman (born October 31, 1971) is a professional aerial stuntman, skydiver and inventor. He is an X Games gold medalist for skysurfing and an accomplished television host for many shows, most notably the MTV series Senseless Acts of Video. He was the face of the award-winning 1998 Pepsi Super Bowl commercial.

Most recently, Troy built a jet-powered personal backpack and used it on skis and in flight. With the device he was capable of skiing uphill and attaining speeds of up to 47 mph. It can take off from the ground.

In 2011, he was developing a jet wing similar to that used by Yves Rossy.

== Life and works ==
Hartman began his work in aviation as a cadet at the United States Air Force Academy, where he developed his skills as a pilot and skydiver. He took up skysurfing in 1993 and competed professionally in the sport alongside Rob Harris (skysurfer) and Patrick de Gayardon. Upon winning the 1997 X Games, he was chosen for the 1998 Pepsi "Goose" Super Bowl commercial, which was voted the #1 ad by the USA Today Super Bowl Ad Meter.

In 1999, Troy was selected as the host and stuntman for the MTV show "Senseless Acts of Video". Over three seasons of the show, he performed multiple first-ever stunts, including the "Plane-to-Plane Skydiving Transfer" and "Parachute on Fire".

Some of Hartman's other television show appearances include hosting 13 episodes of No Boundaries on The WB Television Network, host of the Discovery Channel series "Secrets to Survival", and a stint as the weather man for Good Morning America.

In 2008, Troy began working on his version of the "Jet Wing", which led to the development of a personal jet-backpack. In January 2011, he tested this new device on skis, which proved capable of propelling him uphill and at speeds reaching close to 50 mph. In August 2012, Troy successfully used his jet-backpack to fly with a "speed wing", as part of testing toward his jetwing design.
