= Skysurfing =

Skydiving with board attached to feet for aerial surfing

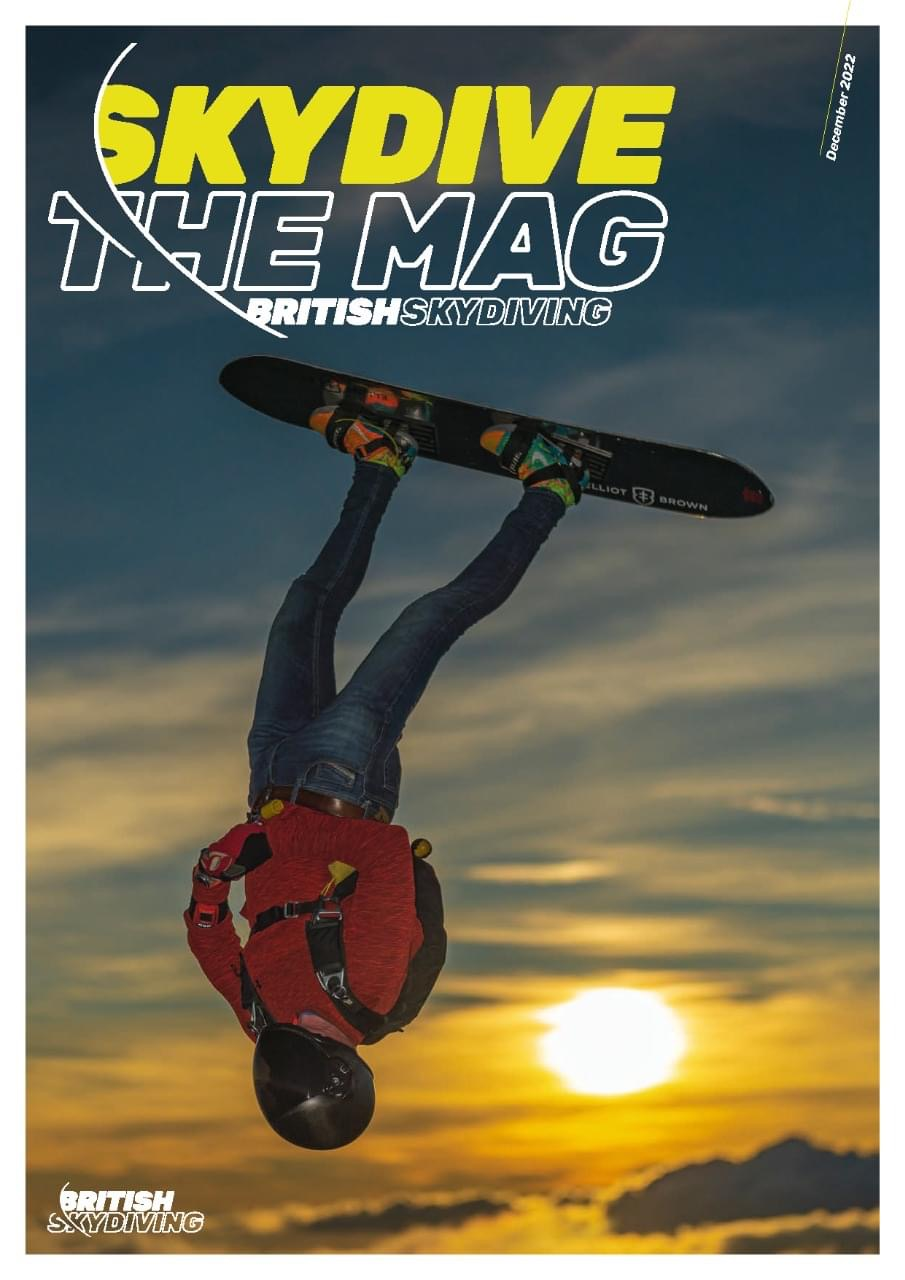

Sky surfing is a type of skydiving and extreme sport in which the skydiver wears a custom skysurf board attached to the feet and performs surfing-style aerobatics during freefall.

The boards used are generally smaller than actual surfboards, and look more like snowboards or large skateboards. Custom bindings attach the board to the feet, which is removable with the use of a 2-ring release system based on the common 3-ring release system used to cut away main parachutes.

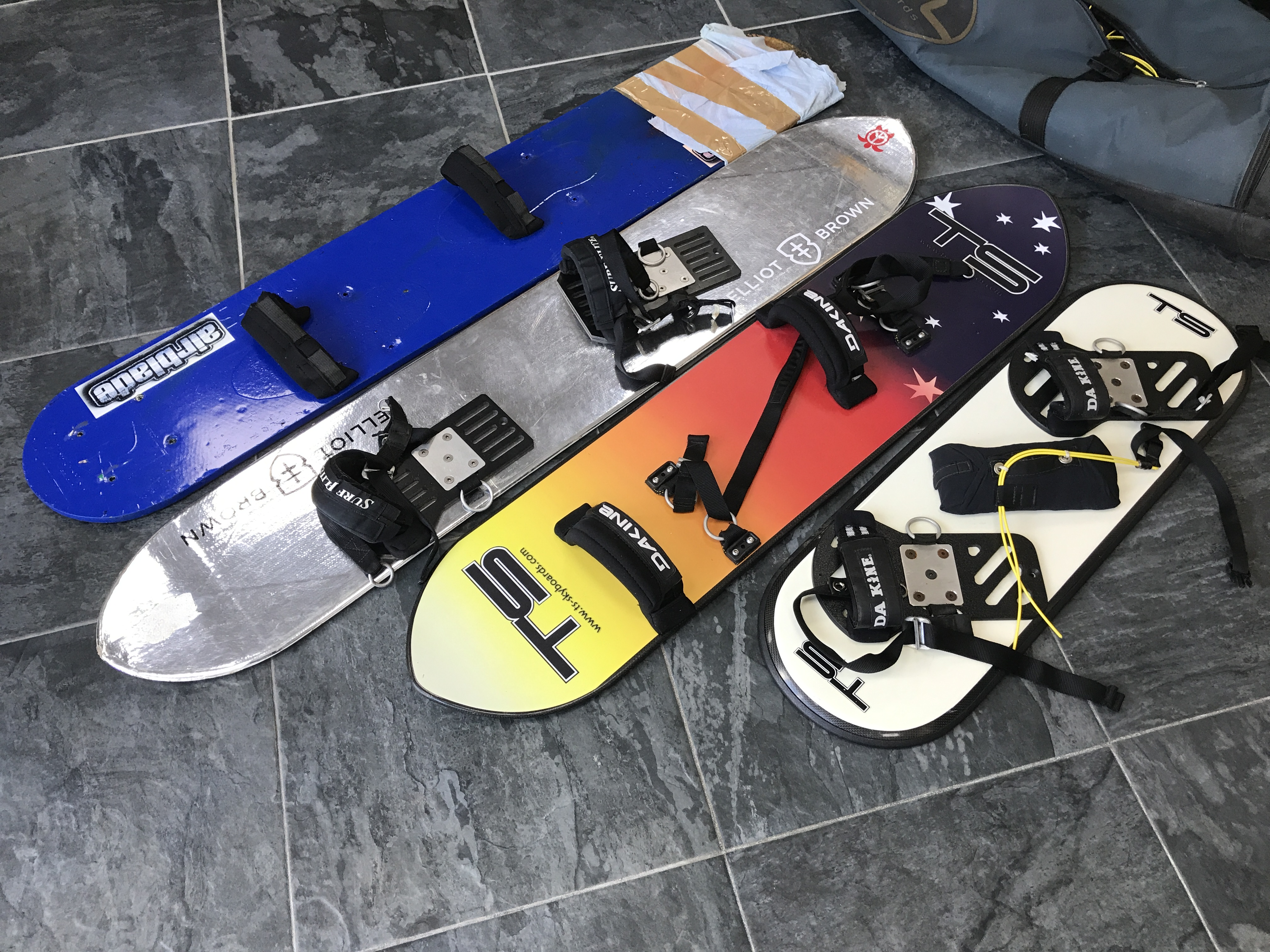
Skysurfing boards in different sizes, beginner - expert

A neutral position maintaining stability is to stand upright on the board during freefall, this is also the position required for deployment of the main parachute whilst surfing medium and expert boards.

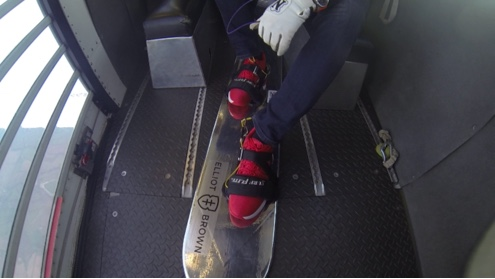
Both feet in the bindings and ready to exit the aircraft

The combination of rigid board and relative wind requires control to maintain stability during freefall. The jumper must control the board and their body position so as to open the parachute in a stable configuration. More advanced aerobatics such as loops, rolls and helicopter spins are possible. Since some moves involve high G-force spins, some skysurfers tightly wrap bandages all the way up their arms to keep the blood from pooling at the end of the limbs. However, even with this bandage technique, many techniques in skysurfing can be extremely painful and result in temporary paralysis of fingers along with subconjunctival bleeding (broken blood vessel in the eye).

When a skysurfer is filmed by another skydiver falling alongside them, the resulting film gives the appearance that the skysurfer is riding on the air in the same way a surfer rides on a wave. The downward motion is not very apparent and this creates the illusion that a skysurfer is floating on the relative wind. A skysurfer falls at speeds comparable to any other freefall or freeflying skydiver, with speed varying depending on orientation. The competitive discipline of skysurfing is a team sport consisting of a skysurfer and a camera flyer with a video camera.

== History ==
Pioneers, included the late Patrick de Gayardon, Eric Fradet & Phillipe Vallaud. Mike Frost, Sean MacCormick and Kebe remain prominent in the sport, each with between 25 - 30 years experience, providing industry seminars and coaching programmes, ensuring the next generation of skysurfers can access the discipline and progress safely along with commercial exposure through the sport.

In 1991, after performing standing on a surfboard for a skysurfing advertisement of Coca-Cola, Ray Palmer became the first Australian skysurfer.

The sport of skysurfing coincided with other new-age disciplines in skydiving freestyle freeflying. It reached its peak in popularity during the mid to late 1990s. Skysurfers were featured in prime time television commercials for major brands like Pepsi, AT&T & Sony PlayStation and continue to this day with Red Bull. The combination of brand association, television coverage and competition promoted the sport of skydiving in a positive manner while producing exciting content for brands to be associated with. A number of movie studios included skysurfing in action sequences such as Silver Surfer & XXX (2002) film. Ralph Lauren created a fragrance brand Extreme Polo Sport based on imagery of skysurfing.

Competitive team skysurfing was prominent during the late 1990s with most notable being ESPN X Games (1995 to 2000) & FAI World Air Games 1997.

The hazards associated with skysurfing are mainly due to loss of control inducing flat spins where the head is outside of the center of the spinning body. Proper guidance & practice will avoid unnecessary risks involved. Safely releasing the board is something that needs to be discussed with an experienced skysurfer. The amount of time required to master the expert board is approximately 1000 jumps.

Skysurf boards are typically custom made by the sky surfer with cooperation from qualified parachute riggers to manufacture the bindings and cut-away systems. Commercial board manufacturers during the 1990s included Tom Stanton and Jerry Loftis; both offering boards in different sizes for beginner, intermediate and expert abilities. SurfFlite has changed ownership a number of times and continues to manufacture boards.

The skill, experience and time required to master skysurfing led to a decline in the popularity in the skydiving community however this is experiencing a resurgence attributed to coaching, the introduction of Vertical Wind Tunnel and as skydivers seek new challenges.

A presentation of the History and Future of Skysurfing was made at the British Parachute Association.

== Competitions ==
Skysurfing Competitions have ranged from FAI World Air Games, SSI pro tour, ESPN X games, national sky surf championships in USA, UK & Switzerland, also Boards Over Europe and Sky surfing World Cup and Skysurfing World Championships.

A sky surfing team include two people; sky surfer and a camera flier. Judges give scores to a sky surfing team not only for the variety of moves and the total performance but also for the skills of camera flier to catch the best moments of performance. 50% of the total score is calculated on sky surfer's performance, and 50% on the cameraman's score.

The first Skysurf World Championship was held in Efes, Turkey on 13–21 September 1997 by the International Parachuting Committee.

Competitive team skysurfing was featured as part of the ESPN X Games from 1995 to 2000. In 1996 and 1997, the SSI Pro Tour staged eight X-Trials qualifying events in both North America and Europe. During this six-year period, pro skysurf teams received a total of $392,000 in cash winnings and the discipline garnered over 100 hours of global TV exposure without incident. In 2000 ABC's Wide World of Sports chose Skysurfing from the X-Games to cover due to its attractive television format.

== Training ==
Training programmes were established to ensure the safe progression of the sport. With the growth in participants and interest to progress safely the British Parachute Association rules were adopted as part of the Operations Manual and guidelines for achieving SS1 & SS2 recognition of their skills. Loftis developed an instructional programme with skysurf schools run by a number of competitive sky surfers. A number of coaching programmes remain, with expert advice and coaching considered mandatory by drop zone owners and chief instructors to mitigate risk.

== Records and firsts ==
As with a new any new sport a number of firsts and records were established, featured in the media and a number recognised by Record Breakers and Guinness World Records. These included the highest altitude exit, surfing in a thunder storm, extreme ironing, most number of spins, surfing above active volcanos and longest distance travelled on a 'sky-glider'.

== Notable skysurfers ==
- Patrick de Gayardon
- Rob Harris
- Mike Frost (Frosty)
- Troy Hartman
- Valery Rozov
- KĒBĒ
- Olga Naumova

== Notable camera flyers ==
- Andy Ford (Fordy)
- Olav Zipser
- Joe Jennings
