= YVE =

YVE may refer to:

- Vernon Regional Airport, in British Columbia, Canada, IATA code YVE
- Yarraville railway station, in Victoria, Australia, station code YVE
