= Air sports at the 2001 World Games – Men's freestyle skydiving =

Parachuting men's freestyle skydiving at the World Games
- Venue: Ogata Athletic Field, Ōgata, Akita, Japan
- Date: 17–19 August 2001
- Competitors: 10 from 4 nations

Medalists
1st place, gold medalist(s)		Olav Zipser; Matt Nelson	United States
2nd place, silver medalist(s)		Nicolas Arnaud; Stéphane Fardel	France
3rd place, bronze medalist(s)		Omar Alhegelan; Greg Gasson	United States

The men's freestyle skydiving event at the 2001 World Games in Akita was played from 17 to 19 August. Ten parachuters from four nations participated in the tournament. The competition took place at Ogata Athletic Field in Ōgata .

== Competition format ==
A total of seven rounds were contested. The team with the most points is the winner.

== Results ==
Rank	Nation	Team	R1	R2	R3	R4	R5	R6	R7	Total
1st place, gold medalist(s)	United States	Olav Zipser; Matt Nelson	8.0	9.0	8.9	8.9	9.1	9.1	9.0	62.0
2nd place, silver medalist(s)	France	Nicolas Arnaud; Stéphane Fardel	6.6	8.5	8.4	8.4	7.7	8.8	8.7	57.1
3rd place, bronze medalist(s)	United States	Omar Alhegelan; Greg Gasson	4.2	8.3	8.8	8.9	7.5	9.2	9.1	56.0
4	Israel	Boaz Goren; Rani Guth	6.5	8.2	8.2	8.3	5.8	7.5	7.6	52.1
5	Netherlands	Peter Leemeijer; Teo van Gelderen	3.3	7.5	7.6	8.1	6.1	8.1	8.3	49.0
