= Oliver Municipal Airport =

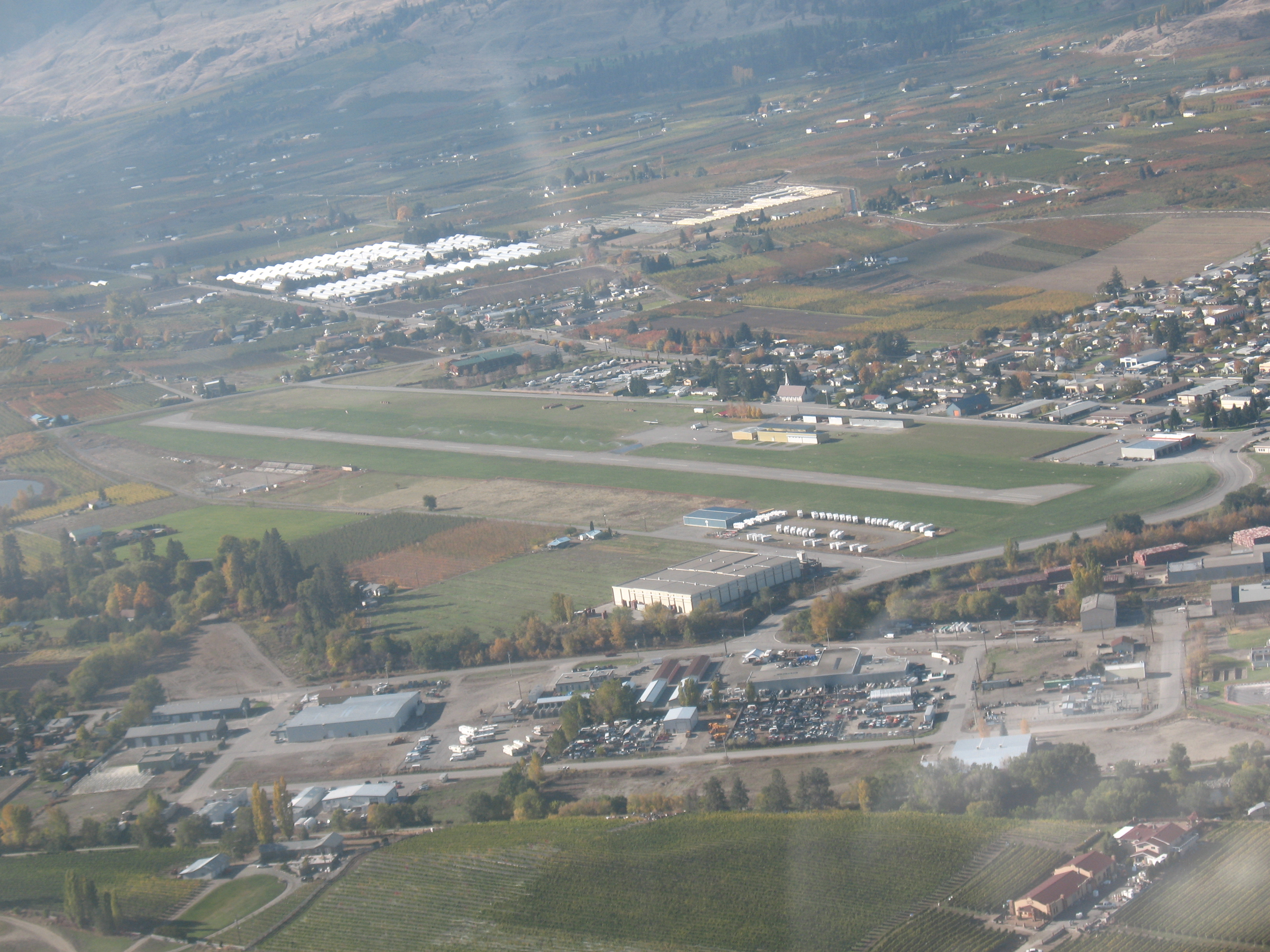
- IATA: none; ICAO: none; TC LID: CAU3

Summary
- Airport type: Public
- Owner/Operator: Town of Oliver
- Location: Oliver, British Columbia
- Time zone: MST (UTC−07:00)
- Elevation AMSL: 1,015 ft / 309 m
- Coordinates: 49°10′24″N 119°33′04″W
- Website: www.oliver.ca/airport

Map
- Location in British Columbia CAU3 (Canada)

Runways
Direction	Length		Surface
Direction	ft	m	Surface
01/19	3,355	1,023	Asphalt
- Source: Canada Flight Supplement

Oliver Municipal Airport (TC LID: CAU3) is a registered aerodrome located adjacent to Oliver, British Columbia, Canada. The airport has been considered for expansion.

The aerodrome is the home of Okanagan-Kooteney Air Cadet Gliding Program, Kootenay Valley Helicopters, Transwest Helicopters, Oliver Osoyoos Search and Rescue (OOSAR) and Oliver Fire Department (OFD).

== History ==
In approximately 1942 the aerodrome was listed as RCAF Aerodrome - Oliver, British Columbia at 49°10′N 119°33′W with a variation of 24 degrees E and elevation of 1,100 ft (340 m). The aerodrome was listed with three runways as follows:

Runway name	Length	Width	Surface
NNE/SSW	3,300 ft (1,000 m)	150 ft (46 m)	Asphalt
N/S	2,600 ft (790 m)	260 ft (79 m)	Gravel
NE/SW	3,050 ft (930 m)	260 ft (79 m)	Gravel

== See also ==
- List of airports in the Okanagan
