= Burrowing Owl Estate =

Coordinates: 49.101297°N 119.533482°W

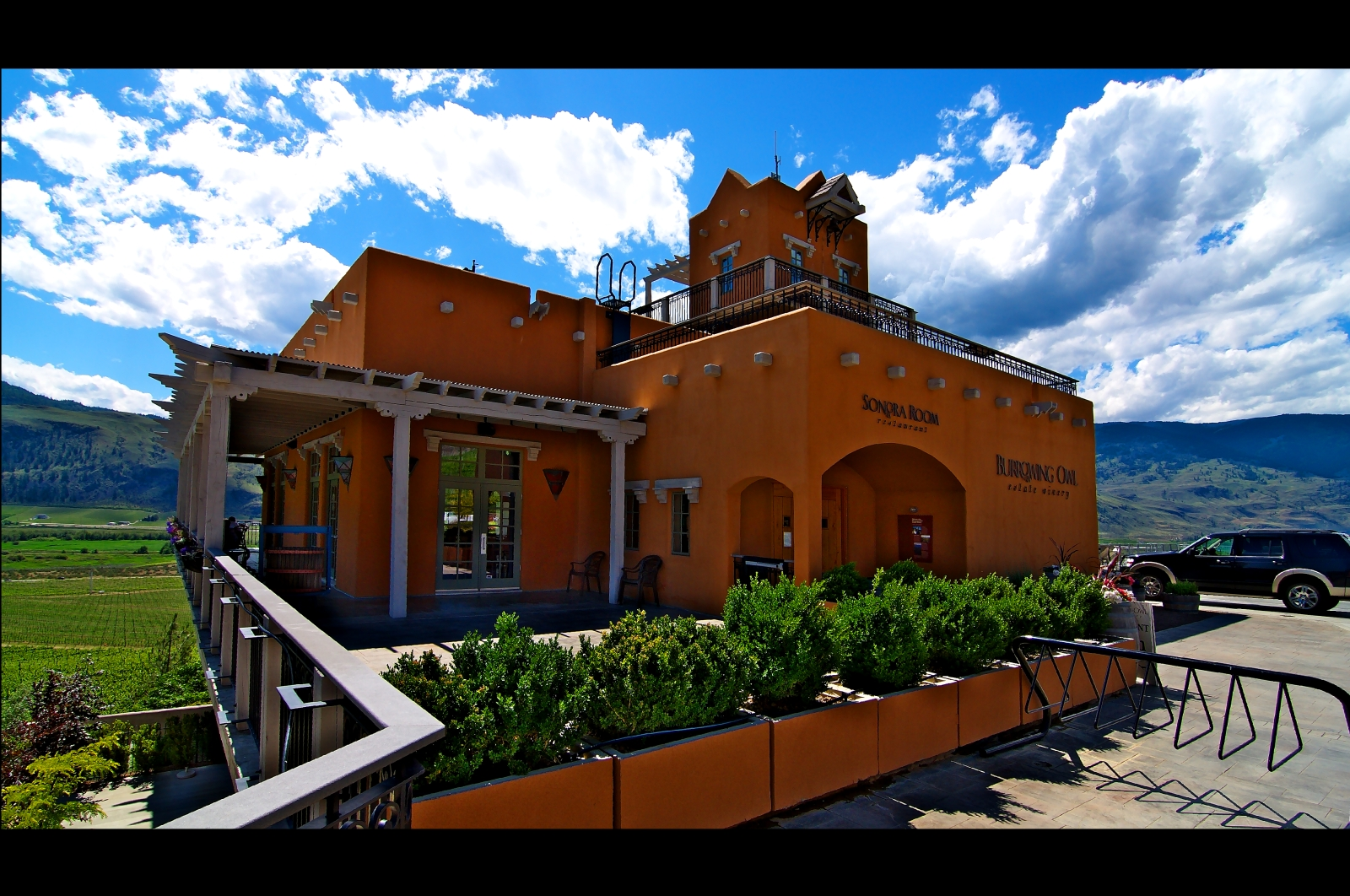
- Location: Oliver, British Columbia, Canada
- Appellation: Okanagan Valley
- Founded: 1993
- First vintage: 1997
- Key people: Jim Wyse (founder), Chris Wyse (president)
- Cases/yr: 28,000 to 30,000
- Varietals: Cabernet Franc, Cabernet Sauvignon, Chardonnay, Merlot, Pinot gris, Pinot noir, Syrah
- Website: http://www.bovwine.ca/

Burrowing Owl Estate is a Canadian wine grower and producer. The estate is based fifteen kilometres south of Oliver, British Columbia, in the Okanagan Valley wine region.

== History ==
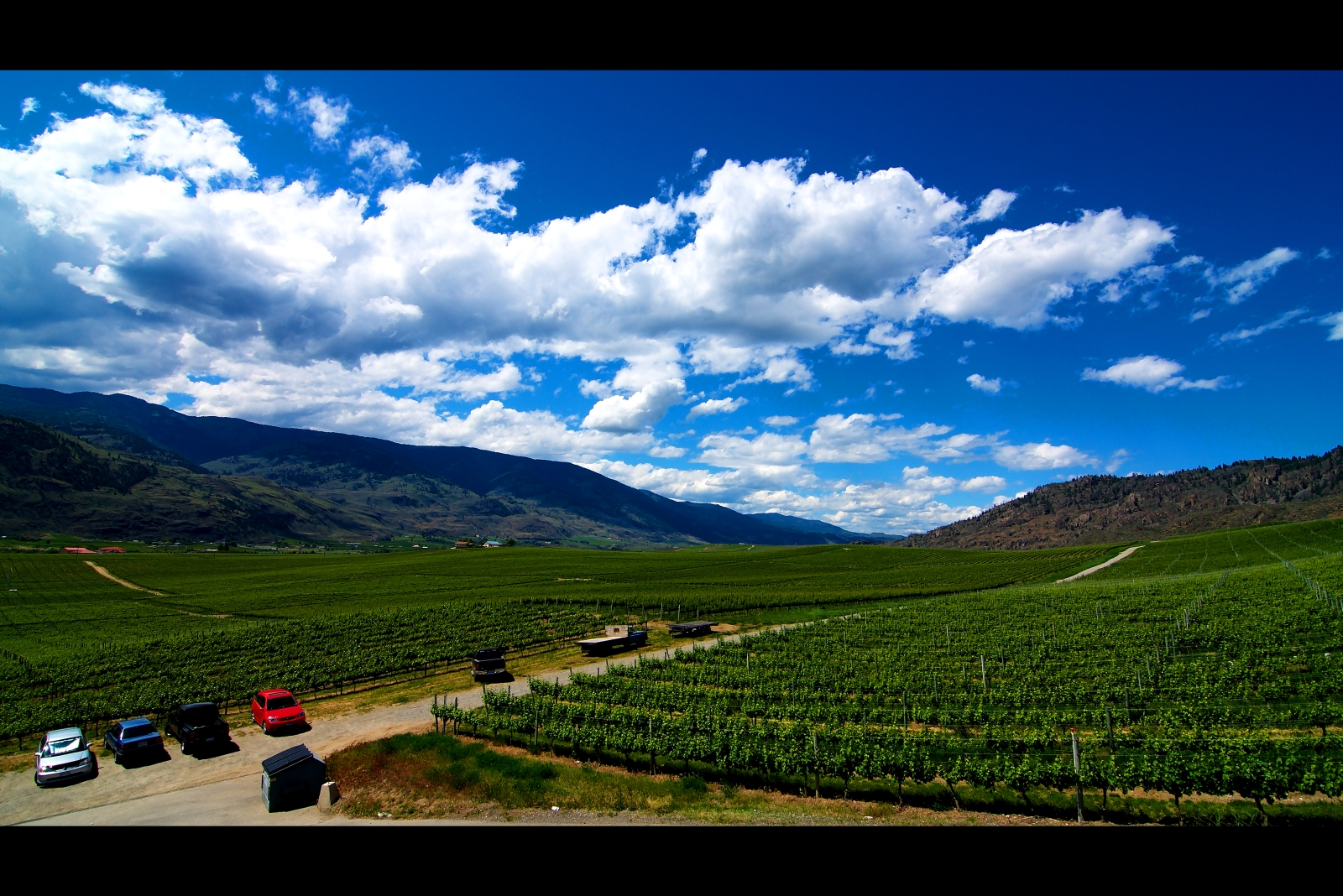
Vineyards at Burrowing Owl overlooking the southern Okanagan Valley.

The estate was started in 1993 when Jim Wyse, a developer from Vancouver, was looking for new business ideas and purchased a neglected vineyard south of Oliver. Initial plantings consisted of Chardonnay, Pinot gris, Merlot and Cabernet Sauvignon.

The estate is named after the endangered burrowing owl (A. c. hypugaea or northern burrowing owl) which resides in the area. Tasting fees from the cellar door are donated to a local conservation society.

The first vintage of grapes was processed at another winery facility in 1997, prior to the completion of the on-site winery in 1998 which has been used for subsequent vintages. The winery was set up to use a gravity flow processing system. The original winemaker was Bill Dyer from California, who continued in this role until 2005 when Stephen Wyse, Jim Wyse's son, took over the job. Bertus Albertyn, a South African, took over the senior wine making position in 2010.

Jim Wyse's son Chris Wyse is the current company president.

Burrowing Owl Estate has been described by James Cluer, a Canadian Master of Wine, as a pioneer of the area and one of the iconic wineries of British Columbia.

== Wines ==
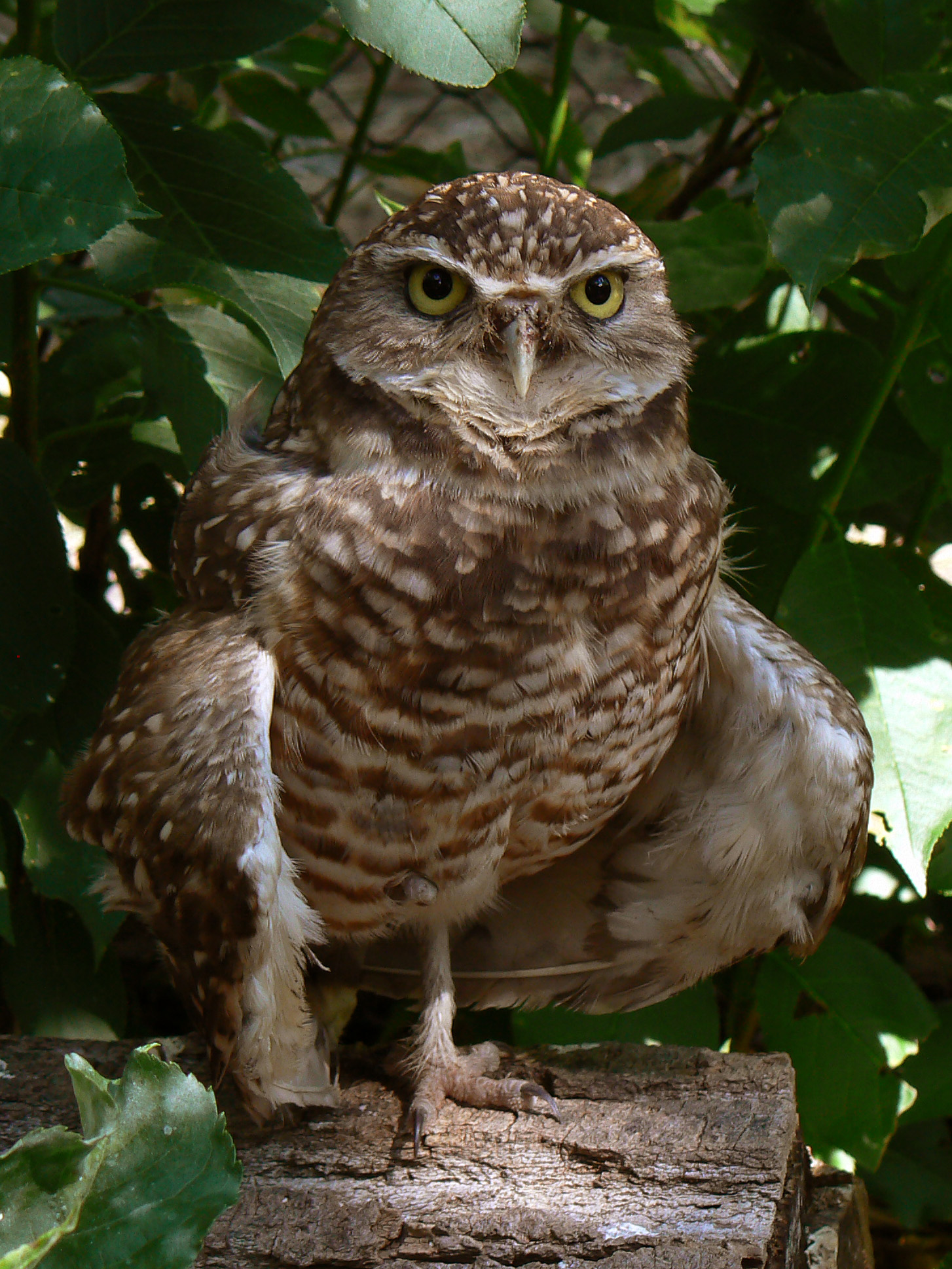
The A. c. hypugaea or northern burrowing owl that is the namesake of the winery.

Burrowing Owl owns 140 acres of vineyards and produces between 28,000 and 30,000 cases of wine each vintage. Organic viticulture techniques are used by the winery as part of the environmental policy.

The estate produces nine wines, entirely from grapes harvested from their own vineyard holdings.

Red wines produced are made from Cabernet Franc, Cabernet Sauvignon, Merlot, Pinot noir, Syrah, a Meritage blend and a new wine released in 2010, the Athene, a blend of Syrah and Cabernet Sauvignon.

White wines are made from Chardonnay and Pinot gris.

== Other ==
Burrowing Owl Estate has a restaurant and accommodation at the winery. The restaurant Sonora Room was opened in 2003 and ten guestrooms were completed in 2006.

The cellar door, restaurant, swimming pool and accommodation are powered and temperature controlled by a hybrid Solar energy and Geothermal electricity heating and cooling system that also provides heated water for winery use.

Quails' Gate Winery and Burrowing Owl formed a partnership called Appellation Wine Marketing Ltd in 2009 to sell and promote a portfolio of local and international wines in British Columbia and Alberta.
