= Inkaneep Provincial Park =

Provincial park in British Columbia

- IUCN category II (national park)
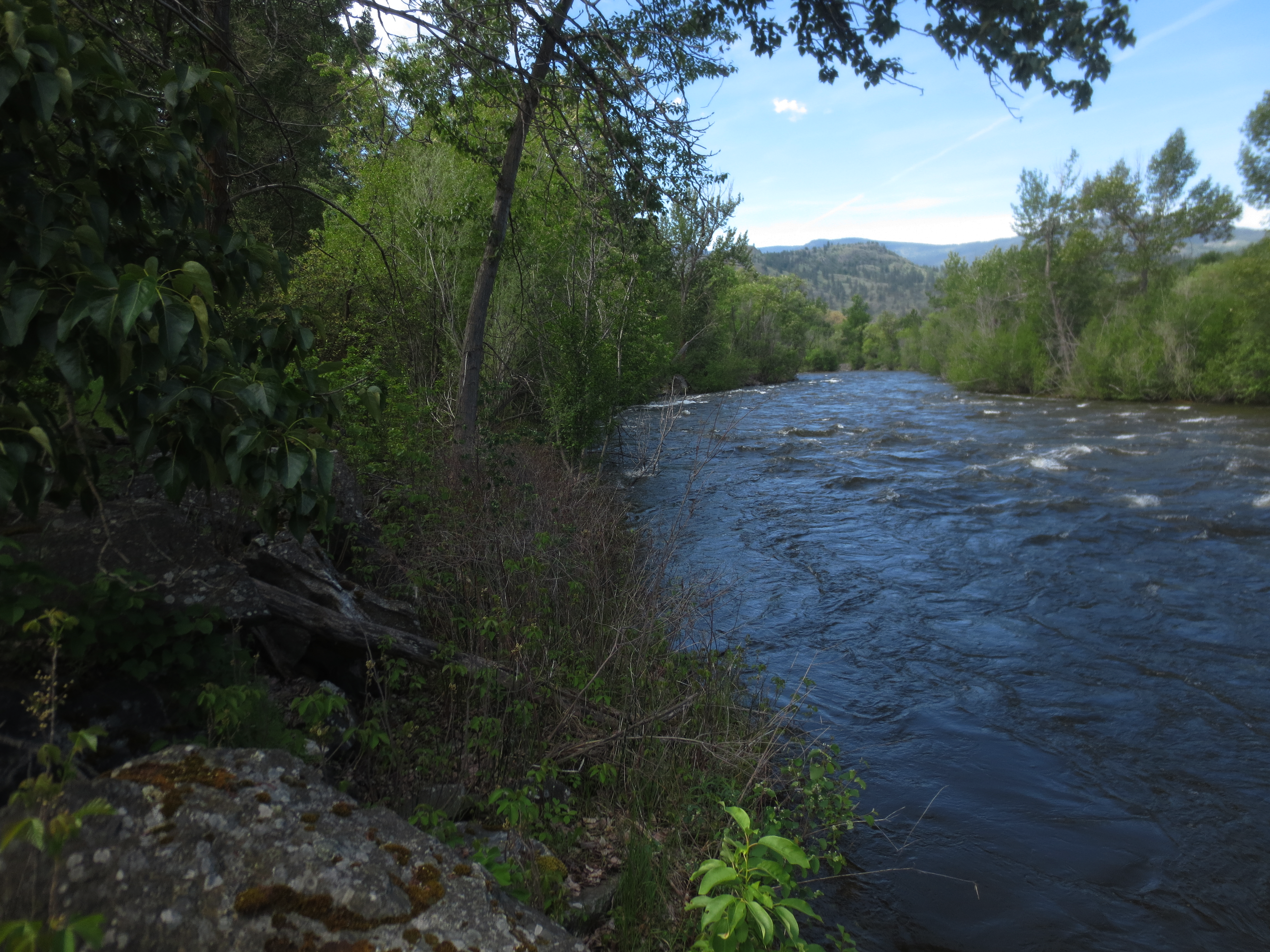
- Okanagan River at Inkaneep Provincial Park swelled with the snowmelt of 2017

- Location within British Columbia
- Interactive map of Inkaneep Provincial Park
- Location: Canada
- Coordinates: 49°13′35″N 119°32′30″W
- Area: 20.5 ha (51 acres)
- Established: 16 March 1956

Inkaneep Provincial Park is a provincial park near Oliver, British Columbia, Canada, located just south of the town of Okanagan Falls. The park contributes to the protection of critical riparian values on the Okanagan River. The park is popular with naturalists, particularly bird-watchers. First Nations have identified the river and riparian area of the park as very important contributor to the long-term viability of the Okanagan River salmon run.

The park's current primary purpose is to protect riparian habitat along the Okanagan River. The park consists of 2 separate areas:

- One area straddles a 750-metre section of the Okanagan Flood Control right of way
- The other lies on the east side of Tuc-El-Nuit Road, abutting the Osoyoos Indian Reserve No. 1.

Park users should use caution when hiking around this park; poison ivy is abundant in this area.

== Rare species ==
Inkaneep Provincial Park has important conservation values including: Lewis' woodpecker and sockeye salmon habitat, and yellow breasted chat, three-awn grass, old growth black cottonwood and antelope brush, one of the four most endangered ecosystems in Canada.

== See also ==
- Inkaneep, British Columbia
