= List of airports in the Okanagan =

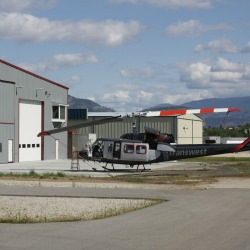
A helicopter sits at the Oliver Municipal Airport, which is located in Oliver, British Columbia, a town situated in the Okanagan region.

The Okanagan is a region located in the British Columbia Interior of Canada that contains five airports, seven heliports, and two water aerodromes. Of the five cities based in the Okanagan, three of them contain aviation services. Vernon contains two: the Vernon Regional Airport and Vernon/Wildlife Water Aerodrome, while Kelowna provides the same number: the Kelowna International Airport and Kelowna (General Hospital) Heliport. The Penticton Regional Airport and the Penticton Regional Hospital Heliport are situated in Penticton, making a total of two aviation services offered in the city. At one time there was a water aerodrome, Penticton Water Aerodrome, in the city. Despite this, the Enderby and Armstrong cities contain no aviation services.

There are also communities that are not cities in the Okanagan, many of which also maintain aviation services. Winfield, a town located within the Lake Country district, provides the Winfield (Wood Lake) Water Aerodrome. The West Kelowna district provides two heliports: the Kelowna (Alpine) Heliport and Kelowna (Wildcat Helicopters) Heliport, while the unincorporated community of Naramata offers the Naramata Heliport. Meanwhile, the towns of Oliver and Osoyoos are home to the Oliver Municipal Airport and Osoyoos Airport. The districts of Peachland and Summerland, along with the town of Oyama in Lake Country, do not provide aviation services.

Two of the airports in the Okanagan provide public commercial flights to other destinations: the Kelowna International Airport which is part of the National Airports System and Penticton Regional Airport. While the Kelowna International Airport serves as the only international airport in the Okanagan area and handles 62 commercial flights a day, the Penticton Regional Airport provides three commercial flights daily, with one fewer on Sunday, to one location: the Vancouver International Airport. A number of other airports in the Okanagan are generally used for personal events, or skydiving, although some have no facilities.

== Airports ==
The following list contains airports, heliports, or water aerodromes that are located in the Okanagan region of British Columbia, Canada. It includes the airport name, location, type, usage, codes of the International Civil Aviation Organization (ICAO airport code) and the International Air Transport Association (IATA airport code), as well as the Transport Canada location identifier (TC LID) code, and coordinates of the airport's location. ICAO and IATA codes are not given for airports which were closed or converted to general aviation before being issued such codes. As shown in the following list, each airport contains certain codes that are given, but not all of the three. Airports are sorted in line with their listing in the Canada Flight Supplement.

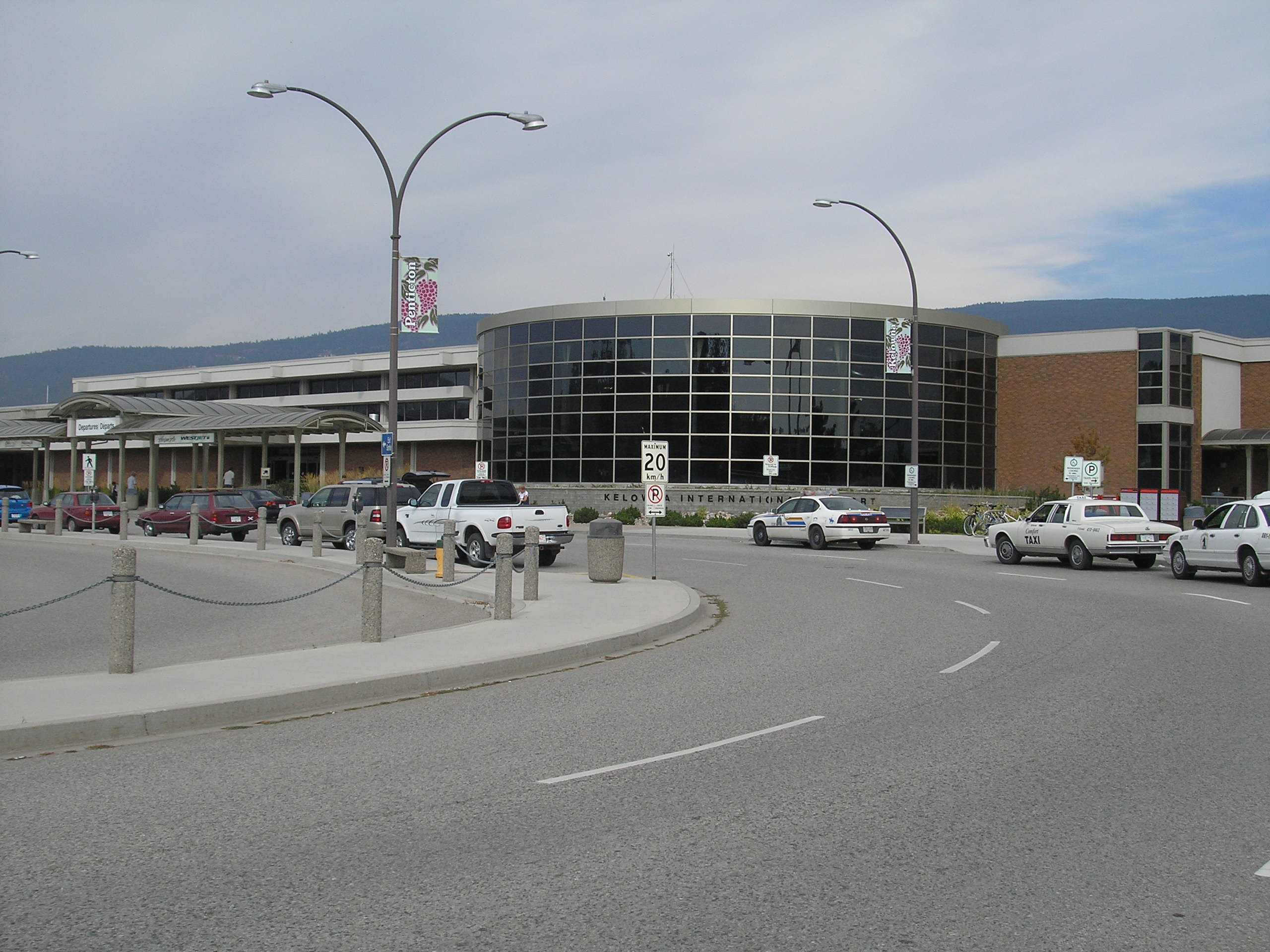
Kelowna International Airport, which is located in Kelowna, serves as the only international airport in the Okanagan.

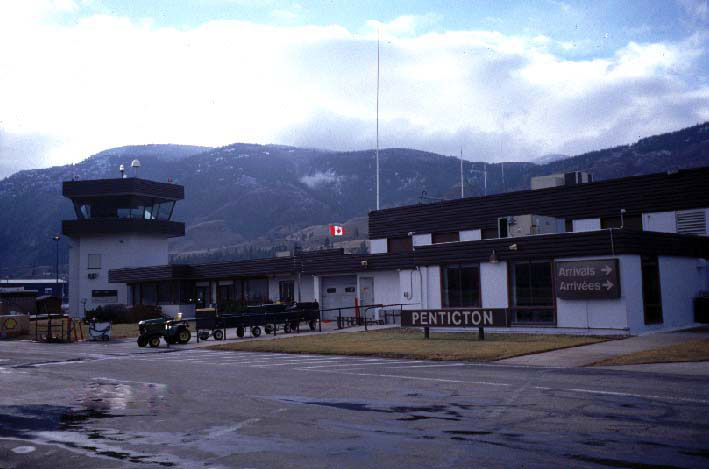
Penticton Regional Airport is located in Penticton, and serves the South Okanagan regional district.

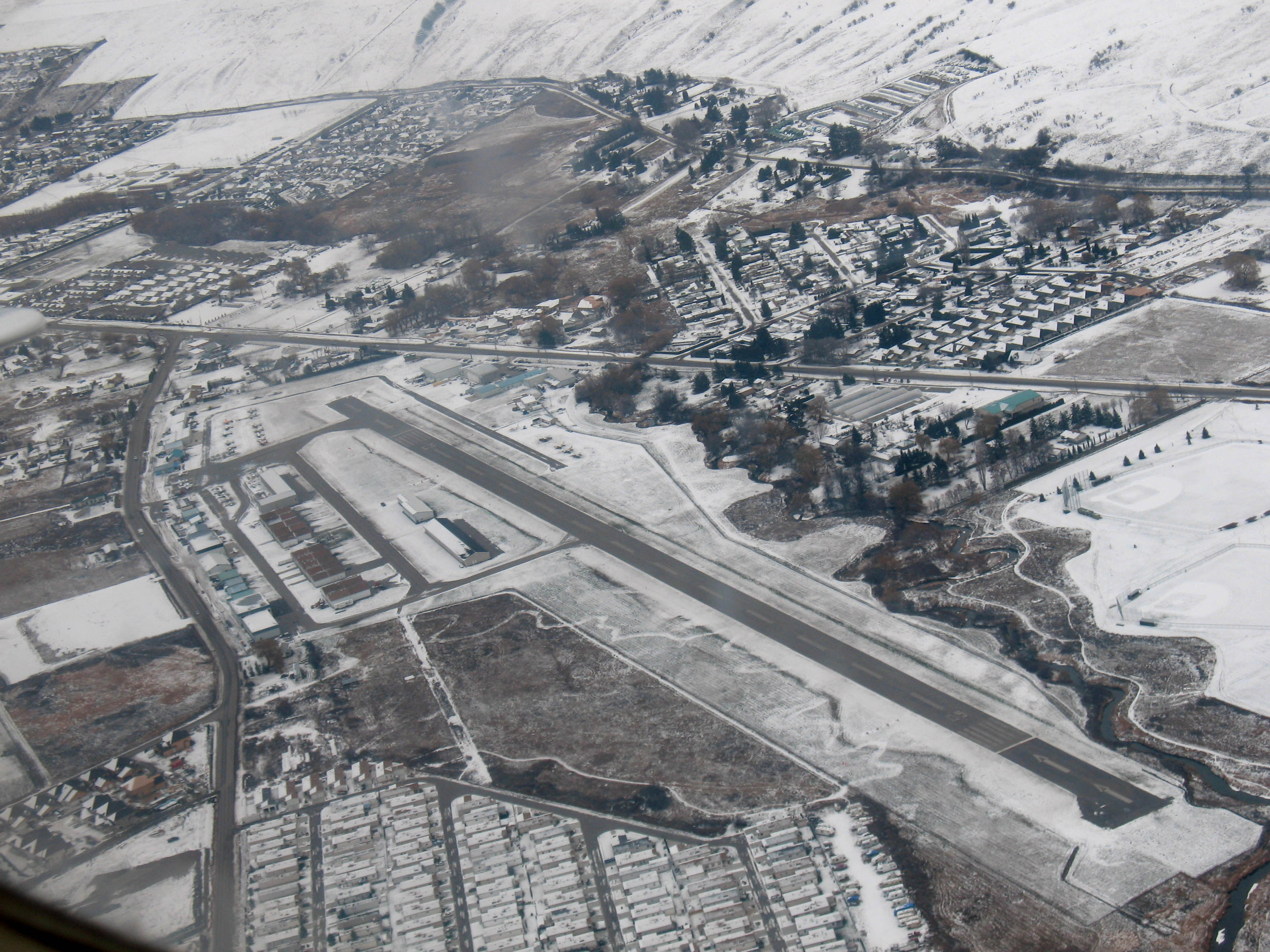
Vernon Regional Airport is a general aviation airport, serving corporate and private aircraft, as well as a skydiving operation.

Airports in the Okanagan
Name	Community	Type	Use	ICAO	TC LID	IATA	Runway length	Coordinates	Ref(s)
Kelowna International Airport	Kelowna	Airport	Public	CYLW		YLW	8,900 ft (2,700 m)	49°57′26″N 119°22′41″W	
Kelowna (Alpine) Heliport	West Kelowna	Heliport	Private		CAB7		86 ft (26 m) diameter	49°51′49″N 119°34′05″W	
Kelowna (Argus) Heliport	Kelowna	Heliport	Private		CRG2		105 ft × 51 ft (32 m × 16 m)	49°57′41″N 119°26′46″W	
Kelowna (General Hospital) Heliport	Kelowna	Heliport	Private		CKH9		86 ft × 86 ft (26 m × 26 m)	49°52′27″N 119°29′33″W	
Kelowna/Ikon Adventures Heliport	Kelowna	Heliport	Private		CIA2		64 ft (20 m) diameter	49°52′51″N 119°31′21″W	
Kelowna (Wildcat Helicopters) Heliport	West Kelowna	Heliport	Private		CWC2		90 ft × 90 ft (27 m × 27 m)	49°52′03″N 119°34′45″W	
Naramata Heliport	Naramata	Heliport	Private		CNM6		75 ft × 75 ft (23 m × 23 m)	49°36′10″N 119°34′43″W	
Oliver Municipal Airport	Oliver	Airport	Public		CAU3		3,200 ft (980 m)	49°10′24″N 119°33′04″W	
Osoyoos Airport	Osoyoos	Airport	Public		CBB9		2,477 ft (755 m)	49°02′14″N 119°29′20″W	
Penticton Regional Airport	Penticton	Airport	Public	CYYF		YYF	6,000 ft (1,800 m)	49°27′45″N 119°36′08″W	
Penticton Regional Hospital Heliport	Penticton	Heliport	Private		CPH6		86 ft × 86 ft (26 m × 26 m)	49°28′54″N 119°34′34″W	
Vernon Regional Airport	Vernon	Airport	Public	CYVK		YVE	3,517 ft (1,072 m)	50°14′46″N 119°19′51″W	
Vernon/Wildlife Water Aerodrome	Vernon	Water aerodrome	Private		CVW2		—	50°14′37″N 119°20′40″W	
Winfield (Wood Lake) Water Aerodrome	Winfield	Water aerodrome	Public		CAY9		—	50°03′00″N 119°24′00″W	

== See also ==
- List of airports in the Gulf Islands
- List of airports in the Lower Mainland
- List of airports in the Prince Rupert area
- List of airports on Vancouver Island
- List of airports in Greater Victoria
