= Inkaneep =

Coordinates: 49°07′00″N 119°30′00″W

Inkaneep is an unincorporated community located on the east side of the Okanagan River within Osoyoos Indian Reserve No. 1, between the towns of Oliver and Osoyoos, British Columbia, Canada, in that province's South Okanagan region.

== Name ==
The name is an older anglicization of Nk'mip, the Okanagan language for "at the head of the lake" or "creek which loses itself in the lake", which the band uses for its Nk'mip Winery and associated museum and desert centre.

== See also ==
- Inkaneep Provincial Park
- List of communities in British Columbia
