= Space Games =

Freefly skydiving competition event

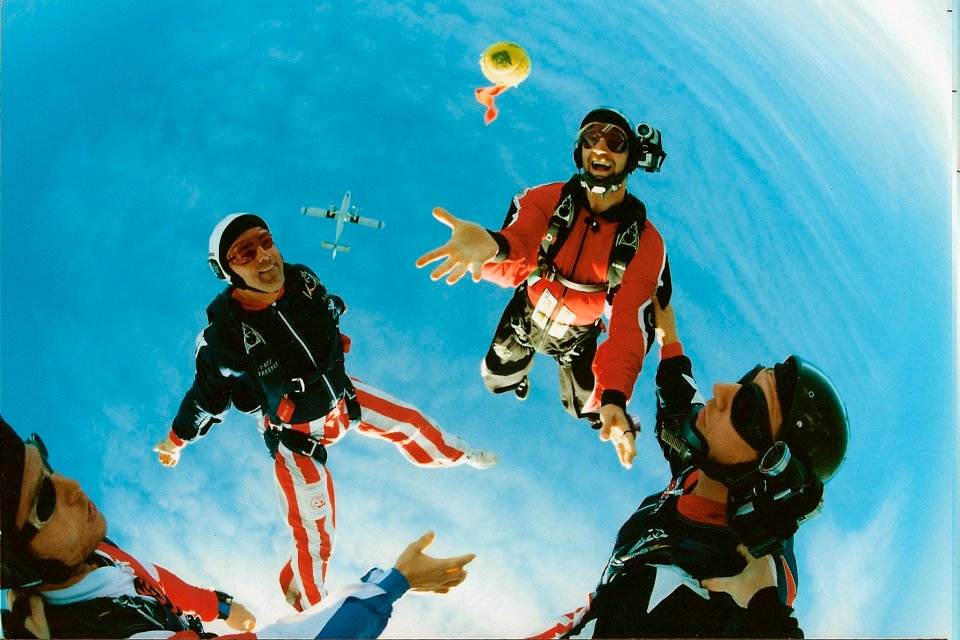
FreeFlyers training with a Space Ball for the Space Games

The Space Games is a freefly skydiving competition event created by 'Father of ' FreeFly' Olav Zipser.

In the early days of freeflying, Zipser wanted to get the best freeflyers at the time together to research, develop, and document the performance evolution of human freeflight / freeflying.

Human flight races, air games and competitions with an open-class and a pro-class were devised, and the first of its kind and first Space Games was held at Skydive America Palm Beach, Pahokee, Florida in 1997.

A total of 16 Space Games events were organised between 1997 and 2006, with cash prizes totalling as much as US$35 000 per event awarded to the winners of different categories.

The Space Games consists of human flight air races and competitions, and incorporates double elimination one-on-one races, open rounds, competition rounds, the FreeFly Indie 500, the FreeFly Atmosphere Dolphin Challenge, Fastest, Slowest and Furthest competitions, Freestyle, Sky Surf, and 3way and 4way FreeFly Challenges.

== History ==
The Space Games came about as a result of the Atmosphere Dolphin FreeFly License Program ran through Olav ZIpser's First School of Modern SkyFlying. Zipser used a constant speed and direction measuring device (space balls) around which high speed precision freefly athletes could train and be tested to fly to the same standard. This provided the testing ground for the research and development of freeflying, and opened up the possibility for a number of human flight air games and competitions.

The 1st Space Games was held at Skydive America Palm Beach, Pahokee, Florida in 1997.

The most recent and 16th Space Games was held at Skydive Sport Center Tortuga, Arezzo, Italy in 2006.

== See also ==
- Olav Zipser
- Freeflying
- The First School of Modern SkyFlying
