= Penticton Regional Airport =

Airport in British Columbia, Canada

Penticton Regional Airport Penticton Airport
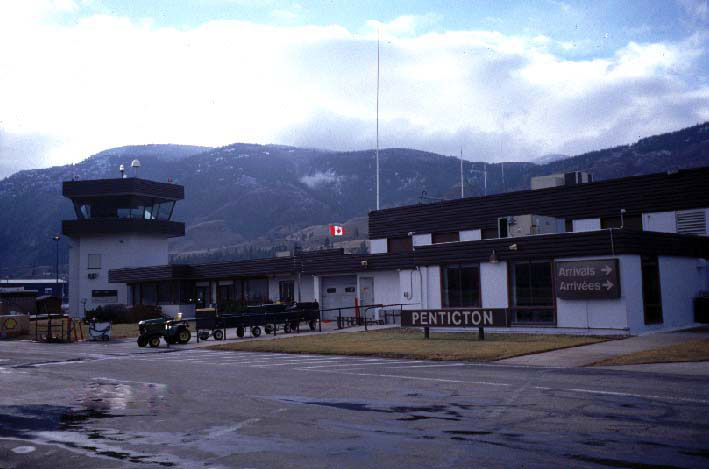
- Main terminal building
- IATA: YYF; ICAO: CYYF; WMO: 71889

Summary
- Airport type: Public
- Owner/Operator: Transport Canada
- Serves: South Okanagan; Similkameen; West Kootenay
- Location: Penticton, British Columbia, Canada
- Time zone: MST (UTC−07:00)
- Elevation AMSL: 1,130 ft (340 m)
- Coordinates: 49°27′45″N 119°36′08″W
- Website: yyf.penticton.ca

Map
- Location of the airport in British Columbia, Canada CYYF (Canada)

Runways
Direction	Length		Surface
Direction	ft	m	Surface
16/34	6,000	1,829	Asphalt

Statistics (2010–11)
- Aircraft movements: 34,946 (2010)
- Passengers: 80,000 (2011)
- Source: Canada Flight Supplement; Environment Canada; Movements from Statistics Canada; Passengers from Penticton Herald

Penticton Regional Airport (IATA: YYF, ICAO: CYYF), also known as Penticton Airport, is a regional airport located 1.8 nautical miles (3.3 km; 2.1 mi) southwest of Penticton, British Columbia, a city in the Okanagan region of Canada. It is owned and operated by Transport Canada, serving the South Okanagan, Similkameen and West Kootenay areas. Initial examination for the airport's construction began in 1937. The proposed locations were owned by the Penticton Indian Band at that time, but expropriated in 1939.

Temporary public use of the Penticton Regional Airport was approved in 1945, and in 1956, it was given a permanent airport license. It has a 6,000 by 148 ft (1,829 by 45 m) runway aligned 16–34, and served approximately 80,000 passengers in 2011. The airport has a restaurant, car rentals, weather office, Canada Customs, forestry air tanker base, helicopter base, and administrative buildings. It has seen two accidents and incidents throughout its history.

The airport has scheduled flights to Vancouver International Airport and Calgary International Airport, provided by Pacific Coastal Airlines and WestJet Encore. Penticton Regional Airport terminal underwent an expansion in 2016 to add more departure seating and a further upgrade in 2019 — 2021. Car parking is available at the airport.

== History ==
Initial examination for the construction of what would become Penticton Regional Airport began in 1937, at two locations. The proposed areas—west of Penticton's city centre and north of the Skaha Lake—were owned by the Penticton Indian Band. The land for the airport was expropriated from the band in 1939 under the War Measures Act, with the preliminary development of the airfield completed in 1941. Because of wartime military air transportation concerns, the airport acted as an emergency landing strip until its tarmac was completed. Rights for a temporary public use airport were secured in 1945 for an operation of 24 hours a day. In 1946, more land was acquired from the Penticton Indian Band for the airport's use.

In approximately 1942 the aerodrome was listed as RCAF & D of T Aerodrome - Penticton, British Columbia at 49°28′N 119°36′W with a variation of 24 degrees E and elevation of 1,120 feet (341 m). The aerodrome was listed as "Under construction - Serviceable" with one runways as follows:

Runway name	Length	Width	Surface
16/34	5,200 feet (1,585 m)	200 feet (61 m)	Hard surfaced

Trans-Canada Air Lines, now known as Air Canada, and Canadian Pacific Air Lines served Penticton after World War II. In 1956, the airport was granted a permanent license, replacing the temporary permit. The airport's runway was extended in 1959, and a new terminal was built in 1963. In 1968, Canadian Pacific Air Lines extended its services for the airport, scheduling two daily flights, only to be taken over by Pacific Western Airlines the following year. However, in 1988, Canadian Airlines ended this service. That was replaced by Time Air and Air BC airlines; both airlines are no longer active.

An aviation centre was constructed at the airport in 1976, which included a 12-unit motel, flight training school, and aircraft overhaul shop; the latter is no longer maintained. Later, a helicopter flight and training club was established. In September 2007, Pacific Coastal Airlines began offering daily flights from this airfield to the Vancouver International Airport and Calgary International Airport for a period of twelve months. During this time, the airline served 22,000 passengers at the airport. It has been able to support emergency Boeing 747 landings since the 1970s, but this capability has never been tested; the runway has been used by Airbus A320s, Boeing 727-200s, Boeing 737-400s, Boeing 737-700s, and Cessna 150s.

According to statistics, the South Okanagan region is underserved in terms of airports, owing to its population. The Kelowna International Airport provides international flights to 62 commercial destinations daily. South Okanagan is home to 79,475 people, totaling 25 percent of the Okanagan area as a whole. The air travel market of the local area consists of 210,000 passengers yearly. However, in 1990, the Penticton Regional Airport was considered to be the area's primary airport, hence why people questioned the need to expand the Kelowna International Airport at that time, when its runway was in the process of expansion.

== Facilities ==
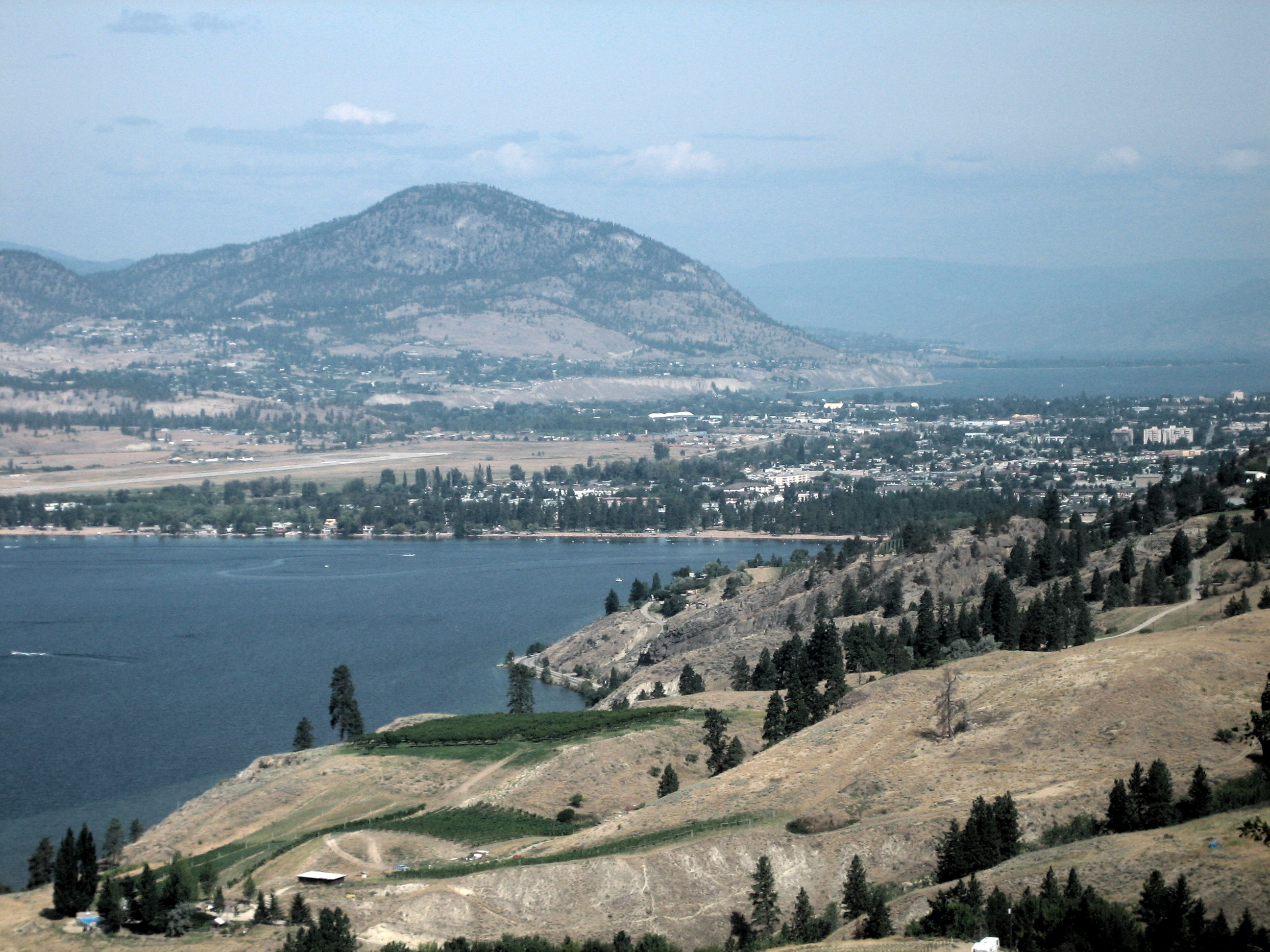
An aerial view of Penticton, with Penticton Regional Airport's runway visible to the left

The airport is located at 3000 Airport Road in Penticton, 1.8 nautical miles (3.3 km; 2.1 mi) southwest of the city centre, situated off of Highway 97. It is located 73 kilometers (45 mi) north of the Canada–United States border, and opposite the Airport Beach attraction, which is a beach situated in the city. Paid parking, taxis and car rentals are available, but there is no bus service. Car rentals are provided by Budget Rent a Car and National Car Rental.

Food and snacks are available at this airport's terminal, as well as a medical facility, accommodation areas and administrative buildings. There is a restaurant provided at the airport's terminal, Sky High Diner, as well as Canada Revenue Agency and Nav Canada offices. The airport's aircraft obtain their fuel from Spencer Aviation, which is located on site; Shell Canada serves as an aviation dealer for the Penticton Regional Airport. The airfield has a 6,000 by 148 ft (1,829 by 45 m) asphalt runway aligned 16–34. This facility maintains a management plan to keep geese off of their runways and properties.

The Penticton Flying Club operates at the airport, which is a club where children receive a flight in an airplane with the pilot, and learn about the airplanes themselves. In addition, the flight school Southern Skies Aviation is based on site; the school closed in 2011 and was reopened shortly after, when it was bought by Kittyhawk A/C Services. The former is also at the airport, serving as an aircraft maintenance centre. There is a radio navigation aid provided at the Penticton Regional Airport which is used by pilots on aircraft coming from other nearby airports to determine their location. The navigation system is owned by Nav Canada. The local and upcoming weather of Penticton is observed at this airport's weather station. Nav Canada has noted that most of the aircraft winds at the Penticton Regional Airport blow north and south.

The facility has been recognized as a certified airport by the British Columbia Ministry of Transportation. Transport Canada categorizes a certified airport through a process which ensures that it meets the safety criteria and provides flights to other destinations. Penticton Regional Airport is considered to be a port of entry that serves American fishermen coming to Canada. It has been classified as an airport of entry by Nav Canada, and is staffed by the Canada Border Services Agency. The Penticton Regional Airport employs 247 persons, including its manager David Allen and maintenance workers.

Controversy has occurred over airport ownership before. When a transfer of ownership to the city of Penticton was planned, effective March 31, 1999, the Penticton Indian Band protested at the airfield on that same day; this forced three scheduled flights to be canceled. Members of the band stated that the land belonged to them, noted they would "never relinquish claim to the airport lands", and expected the airport's ownership to be transferred to them after World War I and World War II. They attempted to conceptualize a different agreement, but Transport Canada suggested the band's claims should be ignored, as it is not a proper government. In response, the Penticton Indian Band blocked road entrance to the airport, and terminal. Transport Canada later announced a six-week break from the ownership situation, and a runway-paving project was placed on hiatus. Based on a suggestion from the Penticton City Council, it was later decided that, if the Penticton Regional Airport be closed, the land may be returned to them, although Transport Canada was against this. As of 2011, the airport is owned and operated by Transport Canada.

== Airlines and destinations ==
Penticton Regional Airport has historically provided flights to several destinations, including Boeing Field—an international airport in Seattle—and the Kelowna International Airport.

As of 2022 Penticton Regional Airport offers direct flights to Vancouver International Airport, provided by Air Canada Express and operated by Jazz Air. These flights were provided three times daily, with the exception of Sunday, when two flights are available. On May 1, 2013, due to feedback from the public, an additional flight to the Vancouver International Airport offered by Air Canada Express was launched. In 2010, the airport garnered 34,946 aircraft movements, while in 2011, it served approximately 80,000 passengers. Air Canada indefinitely suspended their Penticton service on January 11, 2021 due to the impact of the COVID-19 pandemic; the Vancouver service was replaced the following day with six weekly flights by Pacific Coastal Airlines.

Over the years, there have been several attempts to increase destinations serviced from Penticton. And in 2012, local residents attracted the attention of WestJet. Efforts to woo WestJet included the airport being renamed "WestJetville" for a day in June 2012 and local residents created a flashmob video. So on October 26, 2014, WestJet operated by WestJet Encore flew its inaugural flight from the Calgary Airport to the Penticton Regional Airport and continues to fly once daily to and from Penticton. Discussion to expand the flight services provided by WestJet Encore from Penticton continue. However, due to insufficient airport safety-related maintenance, as a result of overgrowth disrupting the view of the runway lighting, WestJet cancelled several of their early morning, and late evening flights to and from the airport.

Airlines	Destinations
Pacific Coastal Airlines	Vancouver
WestJet Encore	Calgary; Seasonal: Vancouver

== Accidents and incidents ==
On December 22, 1950, a Douglas C-47 aircraft operated by Canadian Pacific Air Lines from Vancouver crashed into Okanagan Mountain, some 26 kilometres (16 mi) north of Penticton. Later investigation reported that the aircraft was below the minimum altitude permissible through an instrument approach procedure, causing the beyond repairable damage crash. Two crew members of the 18 total occupants were fatally injured; the remainder survived.

On January 4, 1973, a Pacific Western Airlines Convair turboprop airliner preparing to take off from Vancouver, British Columbia, for a flight to Penticton with 18 people on board was hijacked by 26-year-old passenger Christopher Kenneth Nielson, who drew a gun and demanded $2 million in cash and to be flown to North Vietnam, threatening to blow up the airliner if his demands were not met. During negotiations at Vancouver International Airport, Nielson allowed the other 13 passengers and one crew member to disembark, leaving three crew members aboard the plane with him. The Royal Canadian Mounted Police (RCMP) then stormed the plane and arrested Nielson, finding that he was armed only with two toy guns. There were no fatalities in the incident.

== See also ==
- List of airports in the Okanagan
