= Black Hills Estate Winery =

Canadian Winery

Black Hills Estate Winery is a wine grower and producer based in Oliver, British Columbia, Canada, in the Okanagan Valley wine region. The vineyard, winery, and tasting room is situated on Black Sage Road and they produce wine exclusively from its estate vineyard.

== History ==
The estate was started in 1996 when the property was bought in a joint venture between Peter and Susan McCarrell and Bob and Senka Tennant. In 1999, Black Hills Estate was founded and the varieties Cabernet Sauvignon, Merlot, Cabernet Franc, Sauvignon Blanc, Sémillon, and Chardonnay were planted on the 27 acre Sharp Rock Vineyard. They sold half the grapes to various British Columbia wineries and used the other half to create the first vintage of their flagship blend Nota Bene. In 2001, Black Hills opened its quonset hut to sell the first vintage of Nota Bene. In 2006, an official winery building designed by Pentiction Architect Nick Bevanda was erected to replace the quonset hut. The winery building won the Lieutenant Governor Award in Architecture, making it the only winery in Western Canada to receive this award.

In 2007, Glenn Fawcett formed a group of 350 investors, the Vinequest Wine Partners GP Ltd., including Canadian actor Jason Priestley to purchase Black Hills Estate Winery for $11.3 million. Glenn Fawcett was the President of Black Hills winery from 2007 to 2017. In 2011, Black Hills acquired its 15-acre Double Black Vineyard. Double Black Vineyard is one kilometre south of the original Sharp Rock Vineyard and like Sharp Rock Vineyard, it was originally planted in 1996 with almost identical clones and rootstock.

In 2017, Black Hills Estate Winery, Gray Monk Estate Winery, and Tinhorn Creek Vineyards were acquired by Andrew Peller Ltd for a combined total of $95 million. In 2021, Glenn Fawcett, former president, and current Chief Wine Evangelist at Black Hills, won the Wine Growers British Columbia Award of Distinction.

== Wines ==
Black Hills Estate Winery owns 40 acres of vineyards and produces between 10,000 and 16,000 cases of wine each vintage. Black Hills is best known for its flagship Bordeaux blend, Nota Bene, and for a Sauvignon Blanc-based white, Alibi. Nota Bene was the first wine bottled at Black Hills and it is a blend of four clones of cabernet sauvignon, two cabernet franc, and four merlot. Alibi, another Bordeaux-style wine made with Sauvignon Blanc and Sémillon, came next from Black Hills. Black Hills also produces other blends, such as Addendum, Per Se, and Ipso Facto, and varietally-labelled Viognier, Chardonnay, Roussanne, Syrah, Tempranillo and Carménère.

When the winery was sold to Vinequest Wine Partners GP Ltd., winemaker Graham Pierce was hired to replace Senka Tennant, the former winemaker. Pierce left Black Hills in 2018 and in 2019 Black Hills hired its current winemaker Ross Wise. Ross Wise is the 7th person in Canada and 4th person in British Columbia to be awarded with the Master of Wine Honour. Black Hills vineyard manager and winegrower Steve Carberry is on his 17th year working at Black Hills.
