= Olav Zipser =

German skydiver

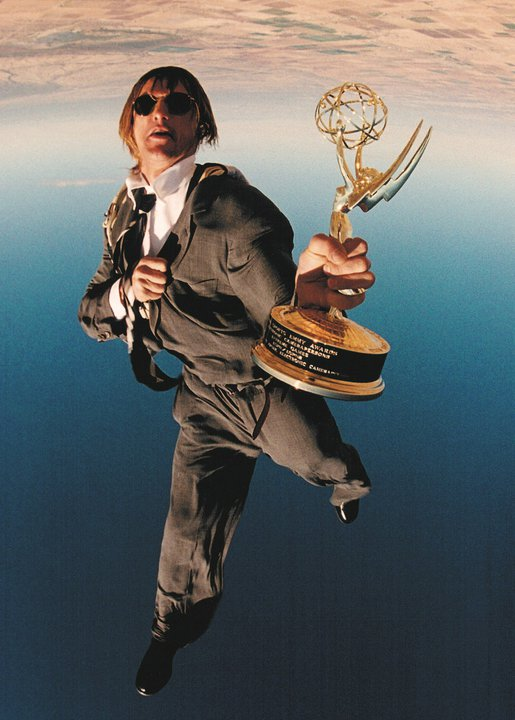
- Zipser freeflying with his Sports Emmy Award
- Born: 12 March 1966 (age 60); Simmern, West Germany
- Other name: 'Father of FreeFly'
- Occupation: International Master FreeFlyer
- Known for: Founding and developing Freeflying, Space Games
- Awards: Sports Emmy 1995 X-Games

Olav Zipser (born 12 March 1966, Simmern, West Germany) is a Sports Emmy Award winning German professional skydiver.

Zipser launched the freeflying movement of the early 1990s when he began experimenting with non-traditional forms of body flight. Since then, he has been part of the worldwide sport of FreeFly and has helped it grow to the Fédération Aéronautique Internationale competition level that it is at today.

Zipser is the founder of the FreeFly Training and Instruction Program, The First School of Modern SkyFlying, the Atmosphere Dolphin FreeFly Licence Program, the Space Games, and The FreeFly Astronaut Project. He was also the first to make use of Space Balls to train and test free flyers to an international standard.

Zipser completed his 21,000th skydive at Skydive Dubai in 2012. As of June 2015 he has logged more than 22,750 skydives. He has flown in 25 of the worlds wind tunnels, won more than 51 gold medals from various international skydiving competitions, has trained 14 world champion skydivers from around the world, and has flown his human body the equivalent of almost three times around the Earth at the equator.

Zipser is a member of the Human Synergy Project, and was a test pilot and astronaut in training with Team Synergy Moon (a Google Lunar X-Prize official team).

In September 2024 Zipser was inducted into the International Skydiving Hall of Fame, which honours legends, leaders and pioneers of the sport of skydiving.

Zipser is known as "the Father of FreeFly" and regarded as one of the best skydivers of all time.

In April 2025, Zipser underwent emergency surgery in Thailand. Complications resulted in an above-the-knee amputation of his left leg. Zipser announced he intends to participate in the upcoming world record FreeFly attempt despite the amputation.

== Birth of FreeFly ==
Zipser started skydiving in the experimental phase of the Accelerated Freefall progression skydiving program in 1986, and immediately began experimenting with non-traditional forms of body flight. He studied and trained human aerodynamics in a wind tunnel for four months. From that experience he developed a new concept of human body flight, which he called FreeFly. First he trained friends, then he developed a professional FreeFly Training and Instruction Program so he could train others to become FreeFly teachers and instructors.

== First School of Modern SkyFlying ==
First School of Modern SkyFlying Logo

With the objective of researching, documenting, developing, teaching, training, and pushing the envelope of human flight capability, Zipser founded The First School of Modern SkyFlying in 1994. He came up with the idea of using Space Balls as independent measuring devices for constant speed (155 mph) and direction (straight down). These measurements train and test freeflyers so that they can meet an advanced international standard.

== Atmosphere Dolphin FreeFly licence program ==
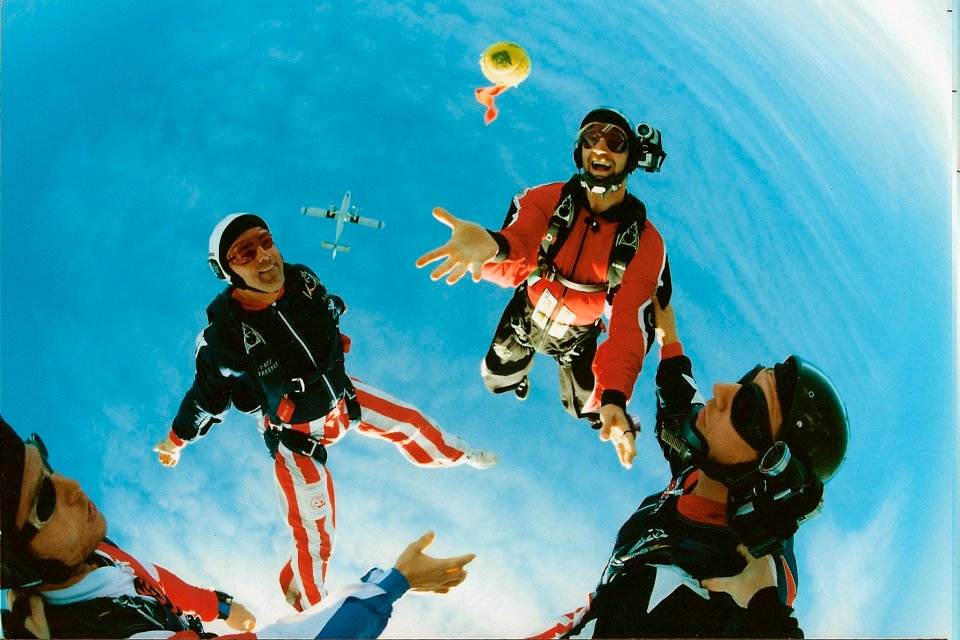
FreeFlying with a Space Ball

Consisting of advanced human flight performance tests / a series of predetermined high speed aerobatic freefly manoeuvres around and with at first one then two Space Balls, in 1996 Zipser developed the Atmosphere Dolphin FreeFly License Program and awarded Atmosphere Dolphin FreeFly Licenses AD-A to AD-D. This provided the testing ground for the research and development of freeflying, and opened up the possibility for a number of high-speed human flight air games and competitions.

Through March 2007, a total of 410 FreeFlyers from 32 nations have achieved Atmosphere Dolphin FreeFly licences. Four of those have earned Atmosphere Dolphin AD-D licences.

== Space Games ==
In the early days of FreeFlying, Zipser wanted to bring together the world's then-best freeflyers to research, develop, and document the performance evolution of human freeflight, or freeflying.

So he devised the first human flight races, air games and competitions. Each has an open-class and a pro-class, based on his Atmosphere Dolphin FreeFly Tests. He also founded the Space Games, which incorporates double-elimination, one-on-one races; open rounds; competition rounds; the FreeFly Indie 500; the FreeFly Atmosphere Dolphin Challenge; Fastest, Slowest and Furthest competitions; Freestyle; Sky Surf; and 3way and 4way FreeFly Challenges.

The first Space Games was held in 1997 at Skydive America Palm Beach in Pahokee, Florida.

== FreeFly officially recognised ==
Zipser won gold at America's first official FreeFly National Skydiving Championships in 2000. He competed again, and won gold at the first official Fédération Aéronautique Internationale FreeFly World Skydiving Championships and World Air Games, held in Spain in 2001.

In 1995 Zipser became the first civilian to skydive from the stratosphere when he jumped from an Ilyushin 76 at 41,667 feet over central Russia. He performed the skydive with Patrick de Gayardon for Sector No Limits Sports Watches. They set the record for exiting an aircraft from the highest altitude without oxygen and achieved FreeFly speeds of 750kmh.

== Sports Emmy Award ==
Zipser received a Sports Emmy Award from the National Academy of Television Arts and Sciences in 1995 for his performance and aerial cinematography of ESPN's inaugural X Games that summer.

== FreeFly Astronaut Project ==
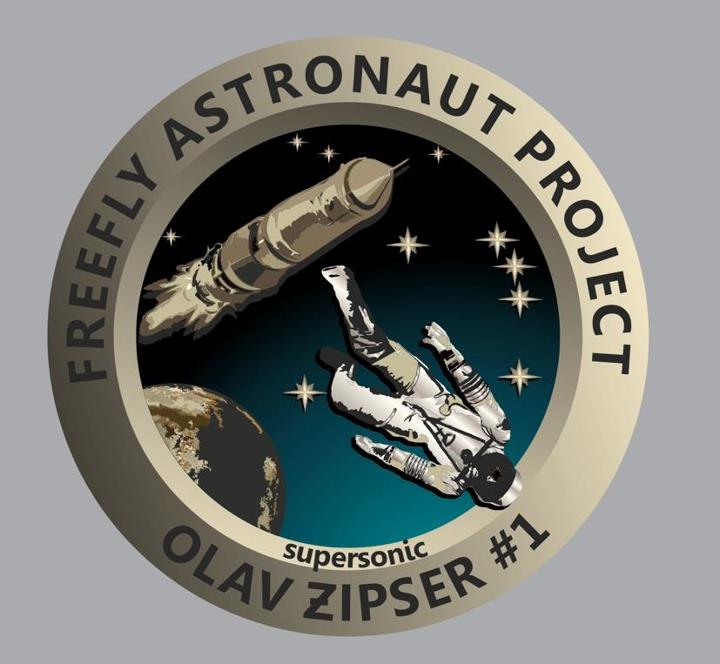
Official FreeFly Astronaut Space patch

Founded by Olav Zipser In 2009, The FreeFly Astronaut Project is a scientific research mission toward the development of appropriate techniques and survival suits for high-altitude and low Earth orbit emergency re-entry survival and rescue situations.

The aim of the project is to develop a safe and economical emergency return and rescue method to improve the odds of survival for mankind's future space pioneers and tourists in the event of a space emergency.

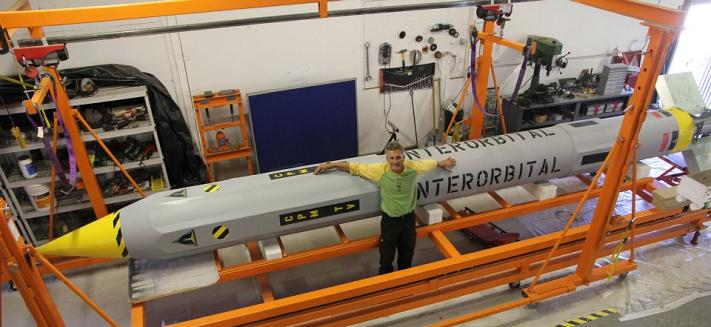
Zipser with InterOrbital Systems IOS SR-145 rocket

Launches will take place from InterOrbital Systems facilities at the Mojave Air and Space Port.

Russian spacesuit manufacturer Zvezda is providing Zipser with a specially modified Orlan Series spacesuit for his FreeFly mission.

In 2011, Zipser spent an undisclosed amount of time at the Yuri Gagarin Cosmonaut Training Center in Russia for training and collaboration on the development of a supersonic spacesuit to be used as an economical rescue and return alternative for astronauts and space tourists.

== Skydive for Rhinos ==
When Zipser traveled to South Africa in 2012 for The Ranch SkyDiving Boogie and Symposium held at The Ranch Resort to give a presentation on the FreeFly Astronaut Project, he was exposed to the rhino poaching crisis. He came on board as an International Skydive for Rhinos Ambassador with African Conservation Trust's Skydive for Rhinos campaign.

== See also ==
- Freeflying
- Space Games
