= Vernon Regional Airport =

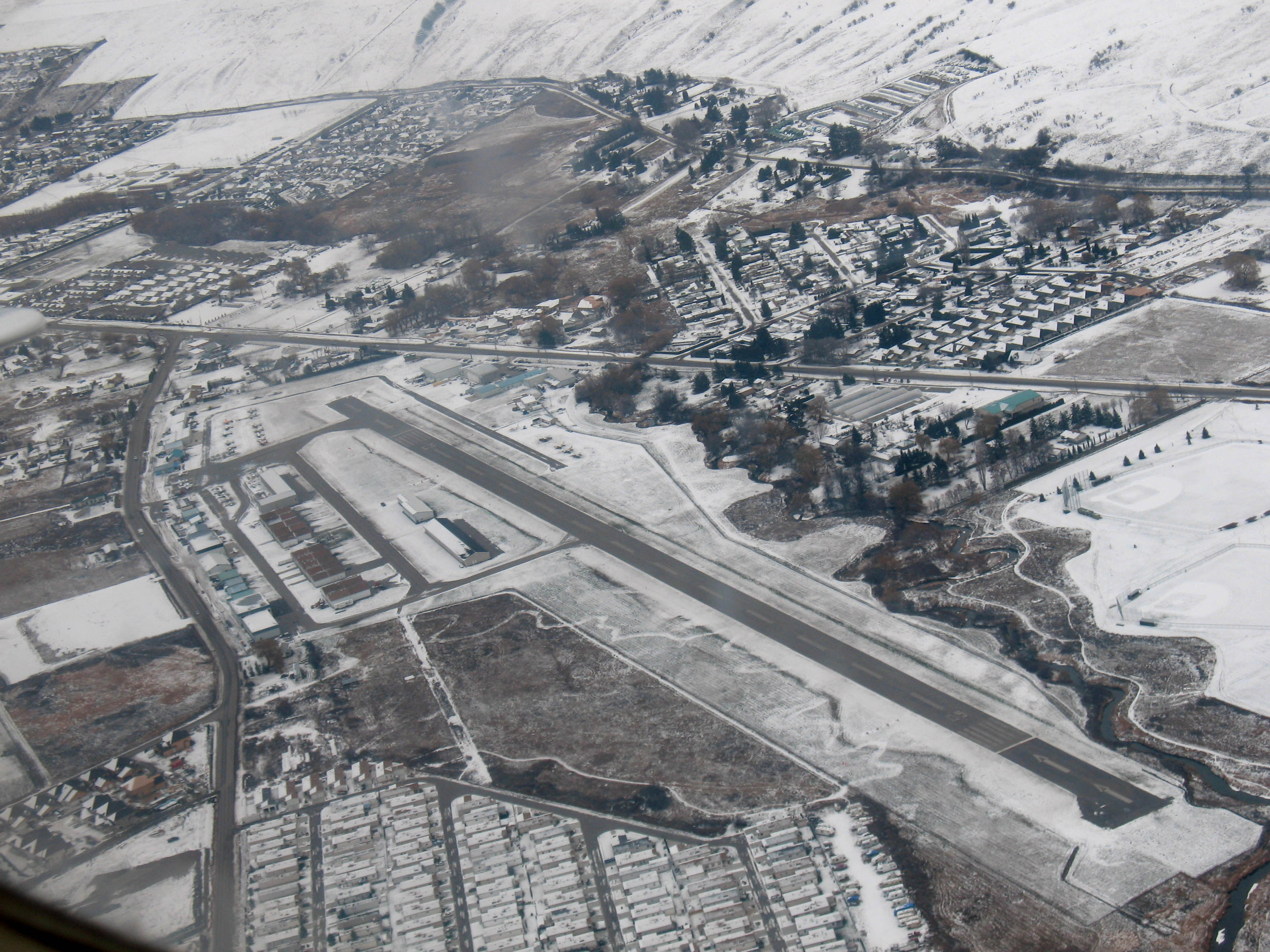
- IATA: YVE; ICAO: CYVK

Summary
- Airport type: Public
- Owner: City of Vernon
- Operator: Vernon Regional Airport Corporation
- Location: Okanagan Landing, Vernon, British Columbia
- Time zone: PST (UTC−08:00)
  - Summer (DST): PDT (UTC−07:00)
- Elevation AMSL: 1,141 ft / 348 m
- Coordinates: 50°14′45″N 119°19′54″W
- Website: Official website

Map
- Location in British Columbia

Runways
Direction	Length		Surface
Direction	ft	m	Surface
05/23	3,517	1,072	Asphalt

Helipads
Number	Length		Surface
Number	ft	m	Surface
East	25 x 25	8 × 8	Concrete
West	25 x 25	8 × 8	Concrete
- Source

Vernon Regional Airport (IATA: YVE, ICAO: CYVK) is a small, non-towered airport 2.3 nautical miles (4.3 km; 2.6 mi) southwest of the centre of Vernon, British Columbia, Canada.

== Mission Hill ==
The original airport was at Mission Hill, about 1.0 nautical mile (1.9 km; 1.2 mi) southwest of the city centre. During World War I, the site was a Canadian Expeditionary Force training camp. In early summer 1919, Lieut. G.K. Trim arrived in Vernon by train to spearhead the formation of a local branch of the Aerial League of Canada (returned airmen). Landings at Mission Hill that August were Lieut. Ernie O. Hall, Capt. Ernest Charles Hoy, and Lieut. G.K. Trim. After that visit, Hoy continued eastward to make the first successful flight over the Canadian Rockies. In June 1921, Col. Scott Williams landed and made several public presentations on the future of aviation. The next arrival was pilot John M. Patterson in a Yukon Airways and Exploration Co biplane in September 1928.

The ideal location of Mission Hill on a trans-Canada air route prompted the Vernon City Council to purchase Mission Hill in late 1929, funded by a $4,000 bond issue. In April 1930, John Henry Tudhope landed. That May, Radium Flying Service opened a flying school. In 1931, the two runways and infrastructure were completed, a temporary airport licence was issued, and a road through the site was diverted. This appears to have been the Kelowna–Vernon highway. That October, the upgraded airport officially opened and an air pageant was presented.

In February 1932, the permanent licence was issued. In July, the second air show was held. That year, the airport was declared a customs port of entry. During the following years, the location became a popular stop for passing aircraft. In November 1936, Air Commodore Herbert Hollick-Kenyon landed the largest plane, an Electra 10-A, while surveying a Vancouver–Lethbridge air route.

In 1939, civil aviation ceased at Vernon for the duration of World War II, when the DND leased the airport from the city for $247.50 annually, which was the interest payable on the bonds.

== Okanagan Landing ==
During 1940, the city examined other potential airport sites and decided on an area near Okanagan Landing. The property had been considered during the 1936 air route survey but was unsuitable because of the Canadian Pacific Railway (CP) right-of-way. However, the Okanagan Landing–Vernon trackage had lost its significance to CP and was abandoned in August 1940 and the rails lifted.

In 1946, the city purchased the identified 21 hectares (52 acres) for $12,000 and spent $6,000 on development to create a 594-metre (1,950 ft) runway. However, the DOT would not grant an airport licence unless the runway was at least 762 metres (2,500 ft). Lacking funds to purchase additional land, the city postponed action. Richard Hamilton (Dick) Laidman, who wished to start a flying school at the airport, personally negotiated for months with the adjacent First Nations band. The outcome enabled the city to lease a 183-by-122-metre (600 by 400 ft) parcel of land. Following development, the DOT granted the licence in July 1947. However, the extended length may have been only 671 metres (2,200 ft).

The Vernon Flying Club was the sole tenant during the late 1940s and early 1950s. At the latter time, the grass runway was paved and the city hangar was built. Since then, many private and corporate clients have been based at the facility, totalling almost 80 aircraft during the 1970s, when the Regional District of North Okanagan administered the airport.

In 1962, customs facilities were established. In 1969, the Vernon Flying Club flew Ernest Hoy from Calgary to Vancouver with stops in Golden and Vernon, where a 50th anniversary celebration of the Rockies crossing was held.

After a relatively brief period of regional district oversight, the extension of the city limits in the 1980s restored city control. The airport obtained a $450,000 federal grant to create a safer realignment of the runway. The 1,070-by-23-metre (3,510 by 75 ft) runway opened with pilot-operated lighting in July 1986. In 1988, the airport received a $621,000 federal grant for improved lighting and a non-directional radio beacon. The next year, gophers disabled the new runway lighting by chewing through the insulation on the underground wiring.

When examined in the mid-2010s, the desirability of extending the runway was found to be cost prohibitive. In 2017, the province provided $823,700 toward repaving the entire runway and some stabilization work.

The 130 aircraft based at the airport in 2015 are projected to increase to almost 180 by 2035. The airport operates in uncontrolled airspace. A recreational drop zone exists for skydiving on the northwest side. The infrastructure includes the public terminal building, hangars, fuel storage, and firefighting equipment. BC Transit connects the airport and Vernon.

== Climate ==
Fog, snow, and blizzard conditions impact operations. The average annual snowfall is 91 centimetres (36 in), which requires frequent plowing in winter.

== Accidents and incidents ==
- August 1946: A Fleet Finch plane crashed short of the runway and burst into flames. Pilot Robert Filtness burned to death and a bystander died of shock. Filtness had applied for a charter to operate a flying school from the airport.
- September 1955: A de Havilland Tiger Moth stalled on approach, spun to the ground, and was totally destroyed.
- May 1967: After takeoff, a Cessna 172 crashed into a mountain killing the pilot and three skydivers on board. The same day, a returning skydiving plane ran out of gas and glided back to the airport.
- December 1976: After takeoff, a homebuilt aircraft plunged into Okanagan Lake killing the pilot and passenger.
- July 1979: The pilot and three passengers died when a Cessna 172 crashed just short of the runway.
- December 1995: Rob Harris (skysurfer) plunged to his death while filming a commercial.
- March 2002: A world-class skydiver twisted her parachute lines and died on landing.
- September 2008: A pilot died when his ultralight crash landed.
- July 2012: The pilot and passenger died when a Piper PA-34 Seneca clipped two trees on takeoff, crashed into a sports field, and burst into flames.

== See also ==
- List of airports in the Okanagan
