= Rob Harris (skysurfer) =

American skysurfer (1966–1995)

- Born: Robert Belmares Harris; December 17, 1966; California, U.S.
- Died: December 14, 1995 (aged 28); British Columbia, Canada
- Cause of death: Fall
- Occupation: Actor
- Known for: Skysurf champion

Robert Belmares Harris (December 17, 1966 – December 14, 1995) was an American skysurfing rider. He was the skysurfing world champion of 1994 and 1995.

In December 1995, while shooting the Mountain Dew "007" commercial, based on the titular fictional character, directed by David Kellogg and lensed by Janusz Kamiński, Harris was in descending flight when his parachute failed to open, causing him to plunge to his death toward the Vernon Regional Airport. An urban legend claimed the final commercial used footage of the fatal accident, which was refuted by Snopes as his appearance utilizes film shot several days prior.

== Memorialization ==
The song "Fall Free" from Alan Parsons's 1996 release On Air is dedicated to the vision of Harris, as is Bobby-B's "99 Rips and Beyond"; the latter album includes a picture of him in the booklet.

After his death, the Rob Harris Foundation was set up in his memory.

Harris was a roommate of Hip Hop artist Daddy X, producer of the Kottonmouth Kings, and they frequently refer to his memory in many of their songs. For example, in the song "Misunderstood", rapper Saint Dog is heard saying "we miss Rob Harris" more than once. Saint Dog also raps, "Like DJ Rob Harris, kid I'm soaring," in the song "Life Ain't What It Seems" off the Kottonmouth Kings debut album, Royal Highness.
