= Freeflying =

Skydiving discipline

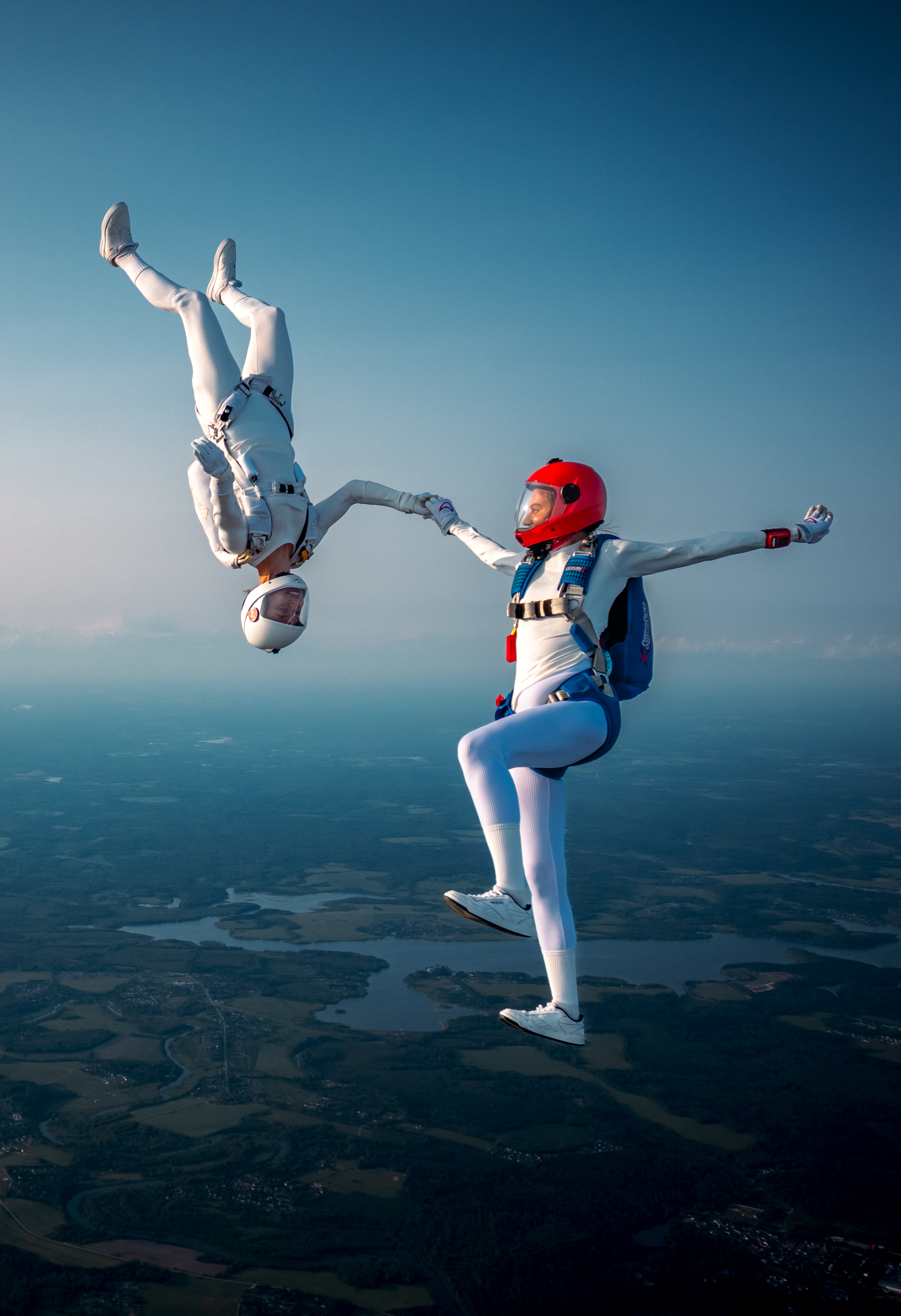
Paired skydivers holding hands in freefall

Free flying refers to any freefall activity involving back, head down, standing or sit positions as opposed to the traditional belly to earth orientation. It includes freestyle and sky surfing. The discipline is known to have originated when Olav Zipser began experimenting with non-traditional forms of body flight. Zipser founded the Free Fly Clowns as a two-person competitive team with Mike Vail in 1992. He was joined by Omar Alhegelan (the first FAI Freestyle World Cup & World Champion), Charles Bryan, and Stefania Martinengo in 1994. The Free Fly Clowns are also credited with opening the first school to teach free flying, The First School of Modern Skyflying.

Free flying entered public awareness in 1996 when the SSI Pro Tour added free flying as a three-person competitive discipline at the second televised event (with Skysurfing), part of ESPN's Destination Extreme series. One-hundred and fifty countries watched the Free Fly Clowns (Olav Zipser, Charles Bryan and Omar Alhegelan) as they took 1st place in all four international competitions along with other teams including: the Flyboyz (Eli Thompson, Mike Ortiz, Knut Krecker, Fritz Pfnür), Team AirTime (Tony Urugallo, Jim O'Reilly, Peter Raymond, Brian Germain), and many other pioneers of free flying.

From 1996 to 1997, the SSI Pro Tour staged eight televised events in both North America and Europe, with $36,000 in cash prizes awarded to free-fly teams. SSI invited the 1997 Pro World Champions, the Flyboyz, to participate in the 1998 ESPN X Games as an unofficial exhibition. The resulting global television exposure attracted considerable attention to the FreeFly Clowns, the Flyboyz, and Freeflying as a discipline. A once fledgling offshoot of the mainstream, freeflying now comprises one-half of the overall skydiving community.

Zipser's Space Games used a "space ball" as a research and measuring device to provide a constant speed and direction from which individual athletes could be trained, judged, and allow individuals to race each other. In 1998, the Space Games accelerated in popularity and brought publicity to the sport Free Flying.

In 2000, Free Fly was accepted as an aviation discipline by the International Parachute Commission (IPC) and the first official Free Fly National Championships were held worldwide.

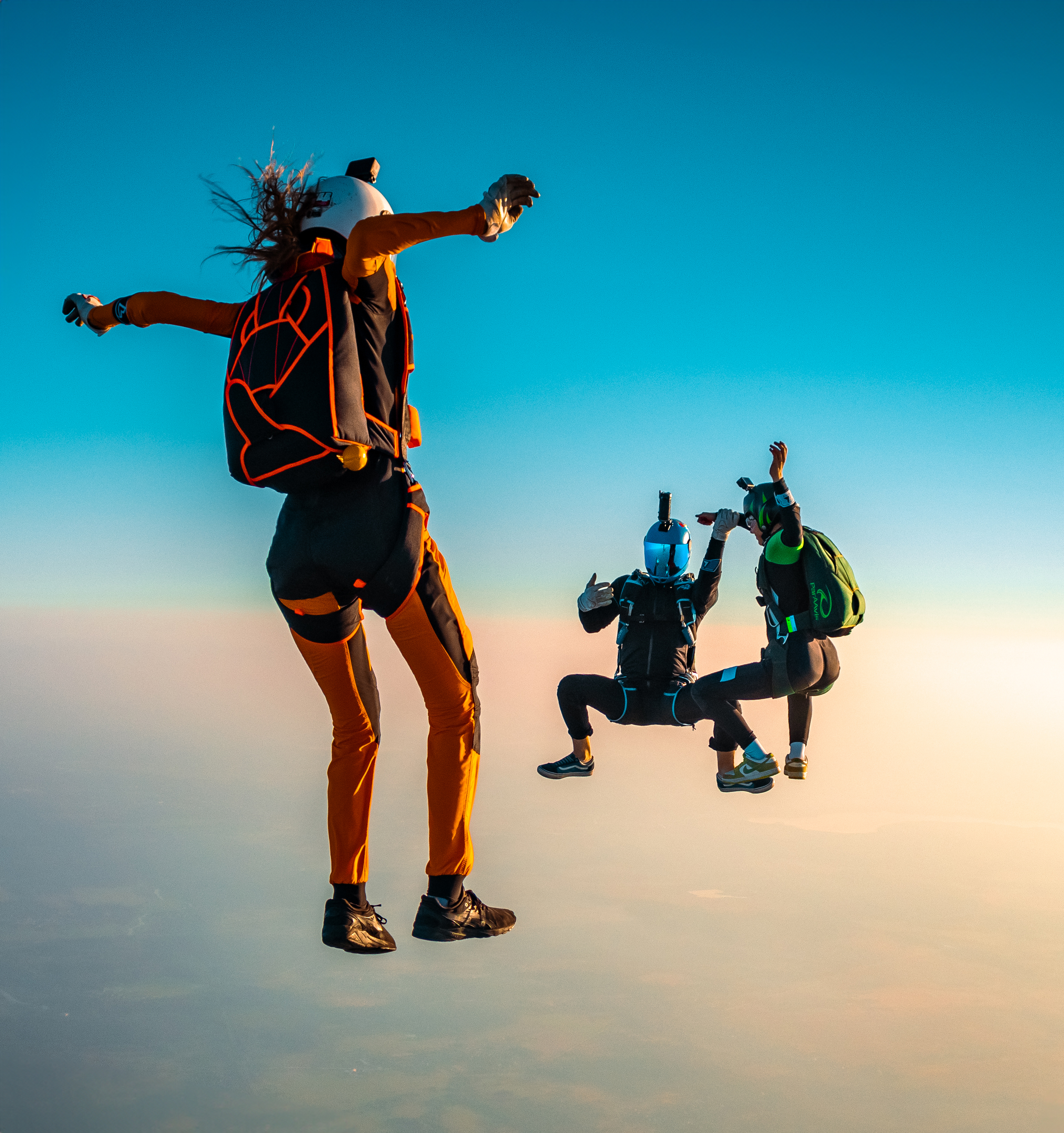
A group of skydivers in freefall formation at sunset

== Technique ==
Free flying is a form of skydiving that involves a range of body orientations, including both traditional belly-to-earth positions and vertical flight, where the skydiver is either upright (feet-first) or inverted (head-first). These positions allow for unique formations and faster freefall.

To master free flying, skydivers must learn various body positions such as the box position (belly-to-earth), back flying, head-up, head-down, and side flying. Skydivers often transition between these positions during a dive, with varying speeds and orientations, either flowing continuously or holding specific positions to form larger formations.

Free flying carries additional risks due to the increased speed. Skydivers must be cautious to avoid collisions with belly-to-earth divers and must slow their descent before deploying their parachute, as most parachutes are not designed for high-speed openings.

Though a newer and more extreme discipline, freeflying is growing in popularity in competitions and record-setting events.

=== Back flying ===
Back flying is the ability to fly on the back in a stable and controlled fashion. This skill is critical, so that when the flyer flips out of some of the more advanced positions, he or she stays in control and does not endanger themselves or other skydivers.

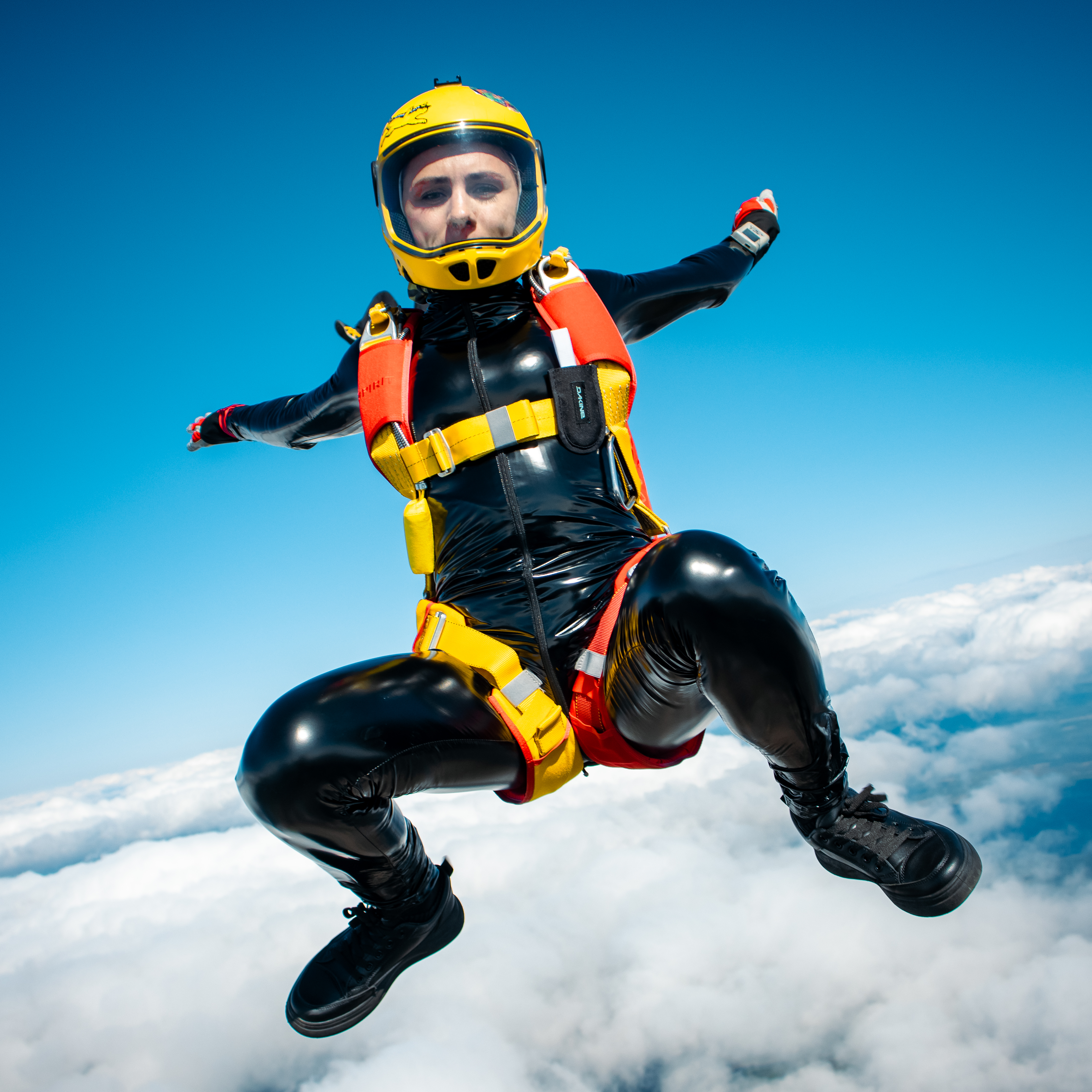
A skydiver in a sit-fly position during freefall

=== Sit flying ===
Sit flying is called such because it looks similar to the position taken while sitting in a chair.

For flying a sit, the feet are oriented toward the relative wind and 90-degree bends are maintained at the knees, hips, and shoulders. To move around, the flyer redirects the airflow in the opposite direction the jumper wants to go. Newtonian mechanics then push the flyer in the desired direction. Fall rate changes (descending faster or slower) can also be made.

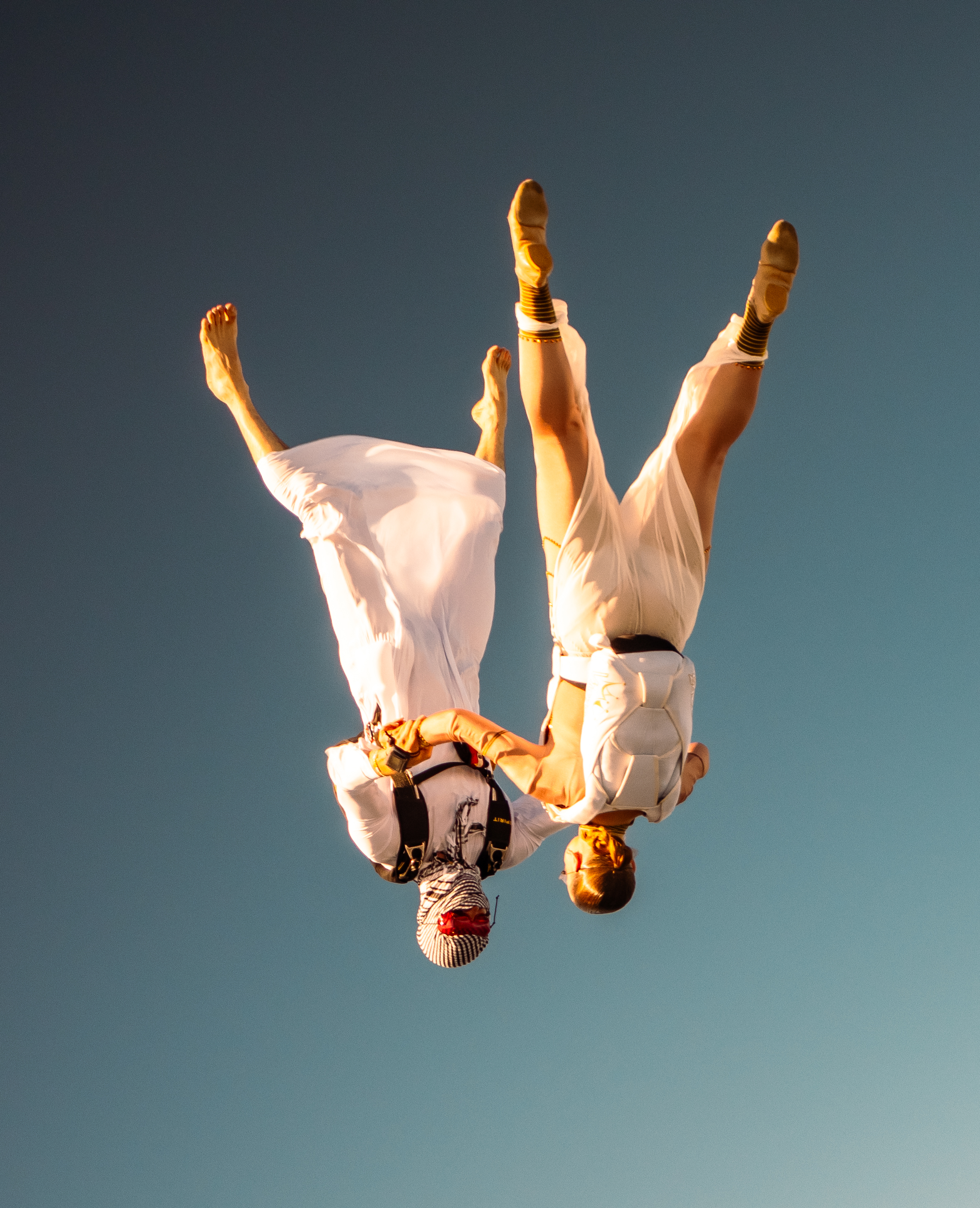
Paired skydivers in head-down freefall formation

=== Head down ===
A person falling in the head down position has less cross-sectional area exposed to the air while falling, which results in much faster fall rates. Average speeds while flying head down are around 260 km/h (160 mph). Due to the increased speed, every movement made can cause the skydiver to become unstable or disoriented; thus increasing the risk involved in free flying.

== Vertical Formation Skydiving ==
Vertical formation skydiving (VFS) is a subcategory of formation skydiving using high-speed body positions normally associated with free flying. Competitors build pre-selected formations in free-fall with multiple people gripping each other's limbs or specially built "grippers" on their jumpsuits.

The Fédération Aéronautique Internationale (FAI) world record for the largest VFS free-fall formation is a 164-way, set on July 31, 2015 over Chicago, Illinois, United States.

Project Horizon, the Lodi Sequentials, VFS Arizona, and several other yearly invitational skydiving events are centered on pushing the boundaries of VFS.

=== Competition ===
There is only one category of official VFS competition, that being VFS 4-way, which is part of the United States Parachute Association Skydiving Nationals. The first official VFS 4-Way US Nationals Competition was held on October 27, 2006, in Eloy, Arizona. Nine teams (45 skydivers) competed.

VFS 4-way has been adopted as an addition to future FAI world competitions (as VFS 4-way), the first being the FAI World Cup in Eloy, AZ, in October 2008.

== Records ==
The world's largest vertical (head down) formation took place on Friday, 31 July 2015, when a multinational team of 164 skydivers, some traveling at speeds of over 200 mph, linked over Skydive Chicago, in Ottawa, Illinois, United States. This broke the previous record of 138 linked skydivers set on Saturday, 4 August 2012 also at Skydive Chicago.

Marc Hauser set the world record for the fastest horizontal free fall at 304 km/h in Empuriabrava, Spain without specialized equipment, in October 2012.

In 2022, skydivers from twenty-two countries set a new all-female head-down world record with 80 free flyers in formation over Eloy USA. The first attempt at the record jump was scheduled to happen in 2020, the 100th anniversary of women being granted the right to vote, but was postponed due to the coronavirus pandemic.

== See also ==
- Freestyle skydiving
- Freefall style
- Parachuting
- Vertical wind tunnel
- Olav Zipser
- The First School of Modern Sky Flying
- Space Games
- Extreme sport
