= Patrick de Gayardon =

French skydiver (1960–1998)

Patrick de Gayardon (French pronunciation: [patʁik də ɡajaʁdɔ̃]; 23 January 1960 in Oullins, Rhône – 13 April 1998 in Hawaii) was a French skydiver, skysurfer and a BASE jumper.

De Gayardon was famous for pushing the boundaries of skydiving. He was one of the first people to develop the unique style of skysurfing, in which skydivers use a snowboard to make aerobatic maneuvers. He also made many famous stunts with his development of a ram-air wingsuit, starting modern-day wingsuiting. In 1998, de Gayardon fell to his death in Hawaii during a skydive with Adrian Nicholas using the wingsuit while testing a modification to his parachute container; his death is attributed to a rigging error he made while making the modification.
