= Oliver, British Columbia =

Oliver
- Town
- Town of Oliver
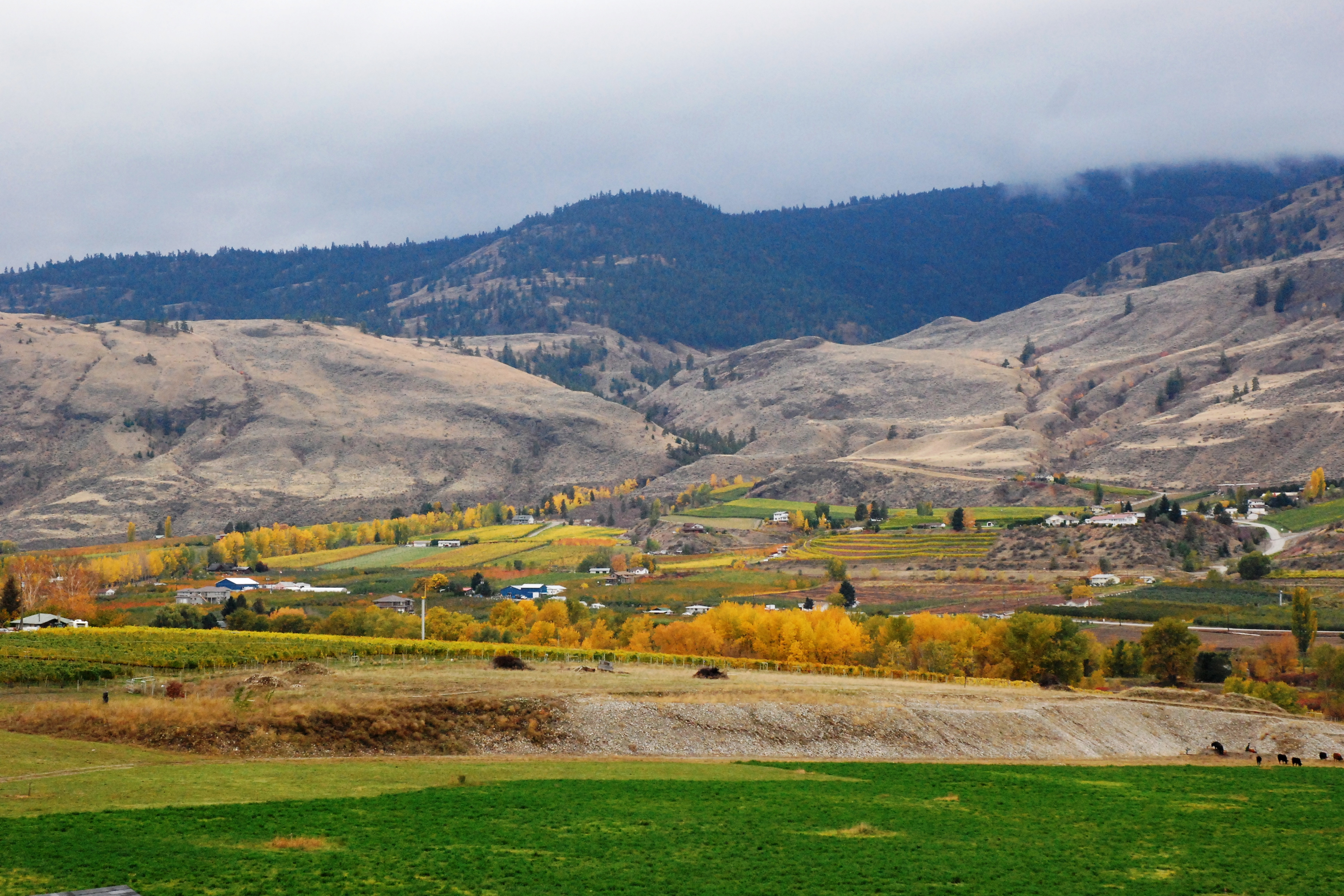
- Motto: "Borne of the Waters, Blest by the Sun"
- Location of Oliver in British Columbia
- Coordinates: 49°10′58″N 119°33′5″W
- Country: Canada
- Province: British Columbia
- Region: South Okanagan
- Regional district: Okanagan-Similkameen
- Village Incorporated: 1945
- Village Founded: 1921
- Town Incorporated: 1990

Government
  - Governing body: Band Council, Town Council, RDOS Board
  - Chief/Mayor/Director: Wayne Anderson

Area
  - Town: 4.88 km^{2} (1.88 sq mi)
- Elevation: 310 m (1,020 ft)

Population (2016)
  - Town: 4,928
  - Density: 1,010/km^{2} (2,620/sq mi)
  - Urban: 5,279
- Time zone: UTC−07:00 (PT)
- Postal code: V0H 1T0
- Area code: 250 / 778 / 236
- Highways: Highway 97
- Waterways: Okanagan River
- Website: www.oliver.ca

Oliver is a town near the south end of the Okanagan Valley in the southern interior of British Columbia, Canada, with a population of nearly 5,000 people. It is located along the Okanagan River by Tuc-el-nuit Lake between Osoyoos and Okanagan Falls, and is labelled as the Wine Capital of Canada by Tourism British Columbia. It was once "The Home of the Cantaloupe" as well as the "Home of the International Horseshow."

The community of Oliver is made up of land governed by three different bodies: the Town of Oliver, the Regional District of Okanagan-Similkameen and the Osoyoos Indian Band.

Local industries include grape and fruit production, agritourism, wine production, ranching, golfing and recreation, retail and service trades. Some of the largest employers include Osoyoos Indian Band, School District #53, Interior Health and Okanagan Tree Fruit Cooperative.

== Origin of name ==
Named after John Oliver (1856–1927), Premier of British Columbia. "Honest John" and his government brought irrigation water and settlement lots to the area with the South Okanagan Lands Project.

The name of the area of this locality in the native Okanagan language is N̓k̓mip.

== History ==
The people of the Syilx Okanagan Nation have lived in the South Okanagan for hundreds if not thousands of years and traditionally moved throughout their large territory to follow seasonal food resources. Many of their camps and village sites were on the shores of the lakes and glacial benches throughout the area. They relied on the river, creeks and valley lakes of the Southern Okanagan for their daily lives.

The first encroachment from European immigrants came circa 1811, when fur traders came to the area with the establishment of Fort Okanagan (now in the US) and first explored the area for trade.

In the 1880s, free gold-bearing quartz was found at Camp McKinney (east of Oliver) which became a busy gold mine, attracting miners and merchants, and boasting a public transportation system. Fairview (just west of Oliver) miners found gold and fueled the growth of a boomtown but it lasted just a few years and no remnants of the town survive today, other than a heritage marker.

- Established in 1921, Oliver began as a settlement for unemployed veterans of the First World War as part of the Soldier Settlement Act of 1917. A gravity-fed canal was constructed to provide irrigation to the semi-arid area.
- On January 30, 1919, the South Okanagan Lands Project (SOLP) began work on the Intake Dam at the base of McIntyre Bluff. Over the next eight years the 23 concrete-lined miles of the main canal were dug southward to the boundary. Eighteen and a half feet across the top, five feet deep and delivering 230 cubic feet per second, SOLP designed it to enable farmers to put nearly a foot of water per month on every acre of bottom land in the southern Valley. To get the canal from the east side of the Valley to the benches on the west, the “big siphon”—now concrete, but originally a 1,940-foot (590 m)-long wood-stave pipe of six and a half-foot-diameter—was constructed. It runs directly beneath the centre of Oliver. The office of the lands project now houses the town office and the building that housed the BC Police built circa 1924 stands today as the Oliver & District Museum.
- A post office, Board of Trade, and the first official business (a general store) were established in 1921 and the BC government administered the area until 1945 when the village was incorporated and a council elected. In 1990, the community's municipal incorporation was upgraded to town, its current status.
- In 1922, electrical power was brought to Oliver by the West Kootenay Power and Light Co.
- In 1923, the Kettle Valley Railway (KVR) constructed a station in Oliver and rails to transport fruit north to Penticton. In 1931, it was leased to the Canadian Pacific Railway. The last train went through Oliver in 1977. The building now sits slightly north of its original position and houses the Oliver Tourism Association and Visitor Centre.
- In 1935, Oliver was featured in Ripley's Believe it or Not for the claim that none of the dogs in Oliver had fleas.
- In 1990, Oliver held the world record for baking the world's largest cherry pie.
- In 2002, on her Golden Jubilee Tour of Canada, Queen Elizabeth II gave the Royal assent that Oliver was the Wine Capital of Canada.

Oliver has been characterized by waves of migrants from different parts of the world. The first non-Indigenous settlers in the area, mostly war veterans and their families, came from the United Kingdom in the 1920s. This was followed by migration from Germany in the 1930s, and Hungarians in the 1940s and 1950s. Immigrants from Portugal arrived in Oliver starting in the 1950s, and soon owned most of the area wineries and orchards. The most recent migration has been of Sikh Canadians, many coming from the Lower Mainland and Calgary. As of 2017, Punjabi Sikhs own about 70 per cent of the area orchards and wineries.

== Administration of water ==
- SOLP (1919–1964) South Okanagan Lands Project – established by the Province of BC 1921 and run by provincial government employees for over forty years. In the spring of 1964 the Oliver/Osoyoos Fruit Growers' Association was informed that the province was getting out of the irrigation business.
- SOLID (1964–1989) South Okanagan Lands and Irrigation District – On June 25, 1964 the Fruit Growers' Association volunteered itself to be the cornerstone of the locally constituted South Okanagan Lands Irrigation District which operated the system until 1989.
- Oliver Water (1989 to present) Town of Oliver – The water district was divided into two parts to be run by municipal governments. The Towns of Oliver and Osoyoos now deliver nineteen billion imperial gallons—nearly one hundred billion litres—to the Valley's parched soils annually. 1990 saw the election of Water Councillors in both communities—a first in BC.

== Airport ==
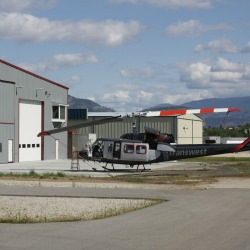
A helicopter lands at Transwest

- CAU3 Paved Hard Surface 3200 ft by 50 ft
- Elevation: 1015 ft
- VFR - Lighted strip
- Owned by Town of Oliver

Coordinates:

- Lat 49-10.24 N
- Lon 119-33.04 W
- Home to Oliver Flying Club (terminal and hangars), Okanagan Kootenay Air Cadet Gliding Program, VMR Aviation, Transwest Helicopters, Oliver Fire Department, Oliver-Osoyoos Search and Rescue and Big Horn Squadron Royal Canadian Air Cadets

== Demographics ==
Historical population
Year	Pop.	±%
1951	1,000	—
1956	1,147	+14.7%
1961	1,774	+54.7%
1966	1,563	−11.9%
1971	1,615	+3.3%
1976	1,641	+1.6%
1981	1,893	+15.4%
1986	1,963	+3.7%
1991	3,743	+90.7%
1996	4,285	+14.5%
2001	4,224	−1.4%
2006	4,370	+3.5%
2011	4,824	+10.4%
2016	4,928	+2.2%

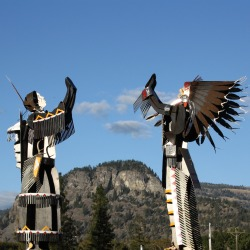
Osoyoos Indian Band iconic sign at Senkulmen

In the 2021 Census of Population conducted by Statistics Canada, Oliver had a population of 5,094 living in 2,312 of its 2,445 total private dwellings, a change of 3.4% from its 2016 population of 4,928. With a land area of 5.49 km^{2} (2.12 sq mi), it had a population density of 927.9/km^{2} (2,403.2/sq mi) in 2021.

- Town of Oliver: 4928
- Regional District Area 'C': 3473
- Osoyoos Indian Band: 900

=== Ethnicity ===
Oliver has seen waves of immigration from the British Isles, Central Europe, Southern Europe, and Southern Asia since non-Indigenous settlement began approximately 100 years ago. With the construction of an irrigation canal to encourage settlement at the behest of former premier John Oliver, the community was originally built for British immigrants and veterans returning from the First World War during the 1920s. Following the initial British migration wave were Germans and Hungarians who first migrated to Oliver between the 1930s and 1950s, followed by Portuguese immigrants between the 1950s and the 1970s, and finally Punjabi Sikhs from the 1980s into the contemporary era.

Today, Oliver's major communities – Indigenous, Portuguese, Caucasian, and Sikhs live in cultural and social silos, with little or no informal social interaction other than in schools, shopping centres and work places.

Panethnic groups in the Town of Oliver (2001−2021)
Panethnic group	2021		2016		2011		2006		2001	
Panethnic group	Pop.	%	Pop.	%	Pop.	%	Pop.	%	Pop.	%
European (Note: Statistic includes all persons that did not make up part of a visible minority or an indigenous identity.)	3,940	79.44%	3,965	84.63%	4,065	87.89%	4,005	94.46%	3,670	88.97%
South Asian	465	9.38%	410	8.75%	315	6.81%	145	3.42%	190	4.61%
Indigenous	260	5.24%	155	3.31%	140	2.38%	55	1.3%	145	3.52%
Latin American	90	1.81%	30	0.64%	45	0.97%	10	0.24%	60	1.45%
Southeast Asian (Note: Statistic includes total responses of "Filipino" and "Southeast Asian" under visible minority section on census.)	85	1.71%	45	0.96%	10	0.22%	0	0%	10	0.24%
East Asian (Note: Statistic includes total responses of "Chinese", "Korean", and "Japanese" under visible minority section on census.)	70	1.41%	60	1.28%	40	0.86%	25	0.59%	30	0.73%
African	25	0.5%	10	0.21%	0	0%	0	0%	10	0.24%
Middle Eastern (Note: Statistic includes total responses of "West Asian" and "Arab" under visible minority section on census.)	15	0.3%	0	0%	0	0%	0	0%	10	0.24%
Other/multiracial (Note: Statistic includes total responses of "Visible minority, n.i.e." and "Multiple visible minorities" under visible minority section on census.)	0	0%	10	0.21%	10	0.22%	0	0%	0	0%
Total responses	4,960	97.37%	4,685	95.07%	4,625	95.87%	4,240	96.47%	4,125	97.66%
Total population	5,094	100%	4,928	100%	4,824	100%	4,395	100%	4,224	100%
Note: Totals greater than 100% due to multiple origin responses.

=== Language ===
According to the 2011 Census, 79.57% of Oliver's population have English as mother tongue; Punjabi is the mother tongue of 5.21% of the population, followed by German (2.87%), Portuguese (2.55%), French (2.45%), Spanish (0.96%), Dutch (0.74%), Hungarian (0.74%), Russian (0.53%), and Ukrainian (0.53%).

Mother tongue	Population	Percentage
English	3,740	79.57%
Punjabi	245	5.21%
German	135	2.87%
Portuguese	120	2.55%
French	115	2.45%
Spanish	45	0.96%
Dutch	35	0.74%
Hungarian	35	0.74%
Russian	25	0.53%
Ukrainian	25	0.53%

=== Religion ===
According to the 2021 census, religious groups in Oliver included:

- Irreligion (2,345 persons or 47.3%)
- Christianity (2,145 persons or 43.2%)
- Sikhism (375 persons or 7.6%)
- Hinduism (20 persons or 0.4%)
- Islam (10 persons or 0.2%)
- Other (60 persons or 1.2%)

Religious groups in Golden (1991−2021)
Religious group	2021		2011		2001		1991	
Religious group	Pop.	%	Pop.	%	Pop.	%	Pop.	%
Christian	2,145	43.25%	N/A	N/A	2,970	72%	2,955	81.86%
Sikh	375	7.56%	N/A	N/A	185	4.48%	20	0.55%
Hindu	20	0.4%	N/A	N/A	0	0%	20	0.55%
Muslim	10	0.2%	N/A	N/A	0	0%	0	0%
Buddhist	0	0%	N/A	N/A	15	0.36%	10	0.28%
Jewish	0	0%	N/A	N/A	0	0%	0	0%
Other religion	60	1.21%	N/A	N/A	25	0.61%	0	0%
Irreligious	2,345	47.28%	N/A	N/A	935	22.67%	605	16.76%
Total responses	4,960	97.37%	N/A	N/A	4,125	97.66%	3,610	96.45%

== Notable people ==
- John Anderson, Admiral (Ret) Former Chief of Defense Staff, graduate of SOHS
- Laslo Babits, Competed in javelin at the 1984 Summer Olympics in Los Angeles, California, finishing in 8th place. Graduate of SOSS
- Bill Barisoff, former Speaker of the British Columbia Legislative Assembly, graduate of SOSS
- George Bowering, First Canadian Poet Laureate, graduate of SOHS
- Patricia Smith Churchland, philosopher and neuroscientist, born in Oliver
- Ross Fitzpatrick, Canadian Senator (Okanagan-Similkameen), graduate of SOHS
- Cody Kearsley, actor, known for his role as Moose Mason in the popular CW series Riverdale, graduate of SOSS
- Corban Knight, ice hockey player for the Philadelphia Flyers
- Clarence Louie, Chief of Osoyoos Indian Band, Order of BC
- Julie Skinner, 2002 Bronze Medal at Winter Olympics in Salt Lake City, Utah (Kelly Law team)
- Alison Smith, CBC TV anchor, graduate of SOSS
- Travis Turner, actor, lead role in the 2011 film Marley & Me: The Puppy Years
- George Victor Jmaeff, US Marine corporal, recipient of the Navy Cross

== Climate ==
Oliver has a semi-arid climate (BSk) with hot, dry summers and cool winters. Annual snowfall is light, averaging just 18 inches (46 cm). Oliver is amongst the warmest communities in Canada with an average daily mean of 50.5 °F (10.3 °C).

Climate data for Oliver, 1981–2010 normals, extremes 1924–present
Month	Jan	Feb	Mar	Apr	May	Jun	Jul	Aug	Sep	Oct	Nov	Dec	Year
Record high °C (°F)	16.0 (60.8)	17.8 (64.0)	23.0 (73.4)	32.2 (90.0)	37.8 (100.0)	47.0 (116.6)	43.9 (111.0)	40.0 (104.0)	38.3 (100.9)	29.0 (84.2)	20.0 (68.0)	16.1 (61.0)	47 (117)
Mean daily maximum °C (°F)	1.9 (35.4)	5.5 (41.9)	12.0 (53.6)	17.4 (63.3)	22.0 (71.6)	25.8 (78.4)	29.8 (85.6)	29.6 (85.3)	23.9 (75.0)	15.6 (60.1)	6.8 (44.2)	1.5 (34.7)	16.0 (60.8)
Daily mean °C (°F)	−0.8 (30.6)	1.4 (34.5)	6.2 (43.2)	10.7 (51.3)	15.1 (59.2)	18.9 (66.0)	22.2 (72.0)	21.8 (71.2)	16.4 (61.5)	9.7 (49.5)	3.3 (37.9)	−1.1 (30.0)	10.3 (50.5)
Mean daily minimum °C (°F)	−3.4 (25.9)	−2.7 (27.1)	0.4 (32.7)	3.9 (39.0)	8.1 (46.6)	11.9 (53.4)	14.6 (58.3)	13.8 (56.8)	8.9 (48.0)	3.7 (38.7)	−0.2 (31.6)	−3.8 (25.2)	4.6 (40.3)
Record low °C (°F)	−26.7 (−16.1)	−28.9 (−20.0)	−17.8 (0.0)	−9.4 (15.1)	−2.2 (28.0)	0.6 (33.1)	3.9 (39.0)	3.3 (37.9)	−5.6 (21.9)	−12.0 (10.4)	−21.0 (−5.8)	−26.1 (−15.0)	−28.9 (−20.0)
Average precipitation mm (inches)	28.7 (1.13)	21.4 (0.84)	24.9 (0.98)	26.5 (1.04)	34.7 (1.37)	41.5 (1.63)	25.5 (1.00)	20.7 (0.81)	18.7 (0.74)	21.6 (0.85)	31.2 (1.23)	34.2 (1.35)	329.7 (12.98)
Average rainfall mm (inches)	13.7 (0.54)	16.3 (0.64)	23.2 (0.91)	26.5 (1.04)	34.7 (1.37)	41.5 (1.63)	25.5 (1.00)	20.7 (0.81)	18.7 (0.74)	21.5 (0.85)	25.9 (1.02)	16.2 (0.64)	284.5 (11.20)
Average snowfall cm (inches)	15.0 (5.9)	5.1 (2.0)	1.7 (0.7)	0.0 (0.0)	0.0 (0.0)	0.0 (0.0)	0.0 (0.0)	0.0 (0.0)	0.0 (0.0)	0.1 (0.0)	5.3 (2.1)	18.0 (7.1)	45.2 (17.8)
Average precipitation days (≥ 0.2 mm)	9.9	8.0	9.0	9.0	9.9	9.9	6.2	5.7	6.2	7.9	11.9	11.7	105.1
Average rainy days (≥ 0.2 mm)	5.5	6.6	8.5	9.0	9.9	9.9	6.2	5.7	6.2	7.8	10.4	5.3	90.9
Average snowy days (≥ 0.2 cm)	4.9	1.5	0.7	0.0	0.0	0.0	0.0	0.0	0.0	0.0	1.9	6.9	15.9
Mean monthly sunshine hours	42.7	83.4	141.3	191.6	239.7	238.6	282.7	274.5	211.9	147.5	64.4	41.4	1,959.6
Percentage possible sunshine	15.8	29.2	38.4	46.6	50.6	49.2	57.8	61.5	55.9	44.0	23.3	16.1	40.7
Source: Environment Canada

== See also ==
- Black Hills Estate Winery
