= Gulf of Roses =

Bay of the Mediterranean Sea in Catalonia, Spain

Coordinates: 42.183°N 3.183°E

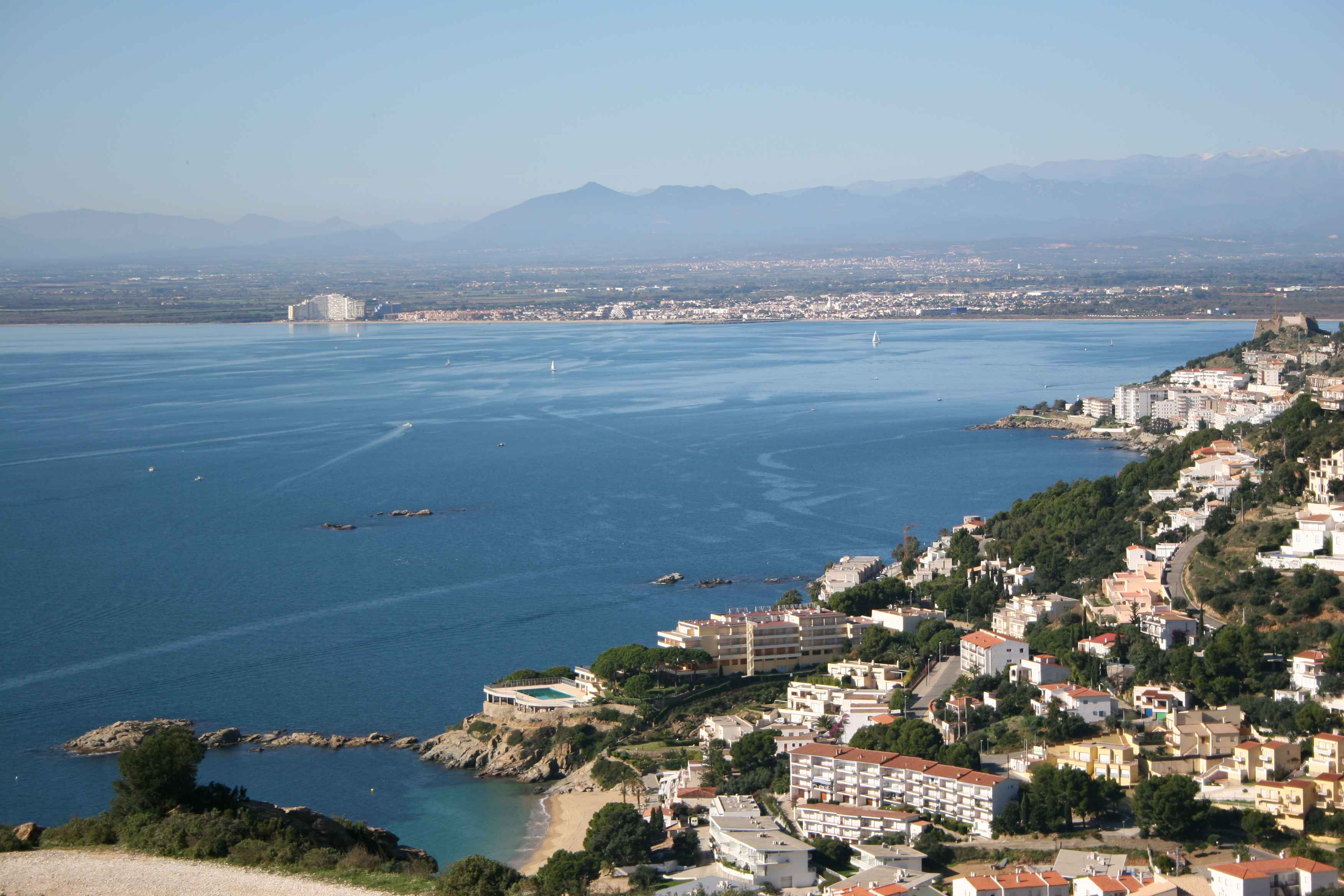
The Gulf of Roses

The Gulf of Roses (Catalan: Golf de Roses [ˈɡolv ðə ˈrɔzəs]) is the most northeastern bay on the Catalan coast of Spain.

The bay is 16 kilometres (10 mi) wide and is formed by the valley of the Fluvià river but also contains the estuaries of the Manol and the Muga rivers. These rivers drain the southern flanks of the eastern end of the Pyrenees and Alberes. The area is often affected by the severe Tramuntana wind.

The bay contains the resorts of Roses, Castelló d'Empúries/Empuriabrava, Sant Pere Pescador, Empúries and L'Escala.

The bay was originally settled by the Greeks, who created a trading post at Empúries which became a Roman town before being abandoned after Viking and Muslim pirate raids along the coast. The area was the domain of the Count of Empúries.

The area was malarial swamp for much of the Middle Ages. Irrigation schemes led to much of the former marshland becoming farmland. Tourism caused further encroachment, in particular the 1960s resort of Empúriabrava, which includes canals and moorings for detached villas. An important wintering spot for traveling birds, the marsh has now been designated the Parc Natural dels Aiguamolls de l'Empordà. To the north overlooking the Bay lies the Parc Natural del Cap de Creus.

The bay was also home to the Catalan restaurant El Bulli.

In 2023, a 250 square kilometres (97 sq mi) area in the Gulf of Roses was approved to host wind farms, as the only suitable offshore location in Catalonia. The construction has been opposed by some groups and political parties concerned about the wind farms' impact on vulnerable species, but as of 2024, it was supported by the three largest Catalan political parties.

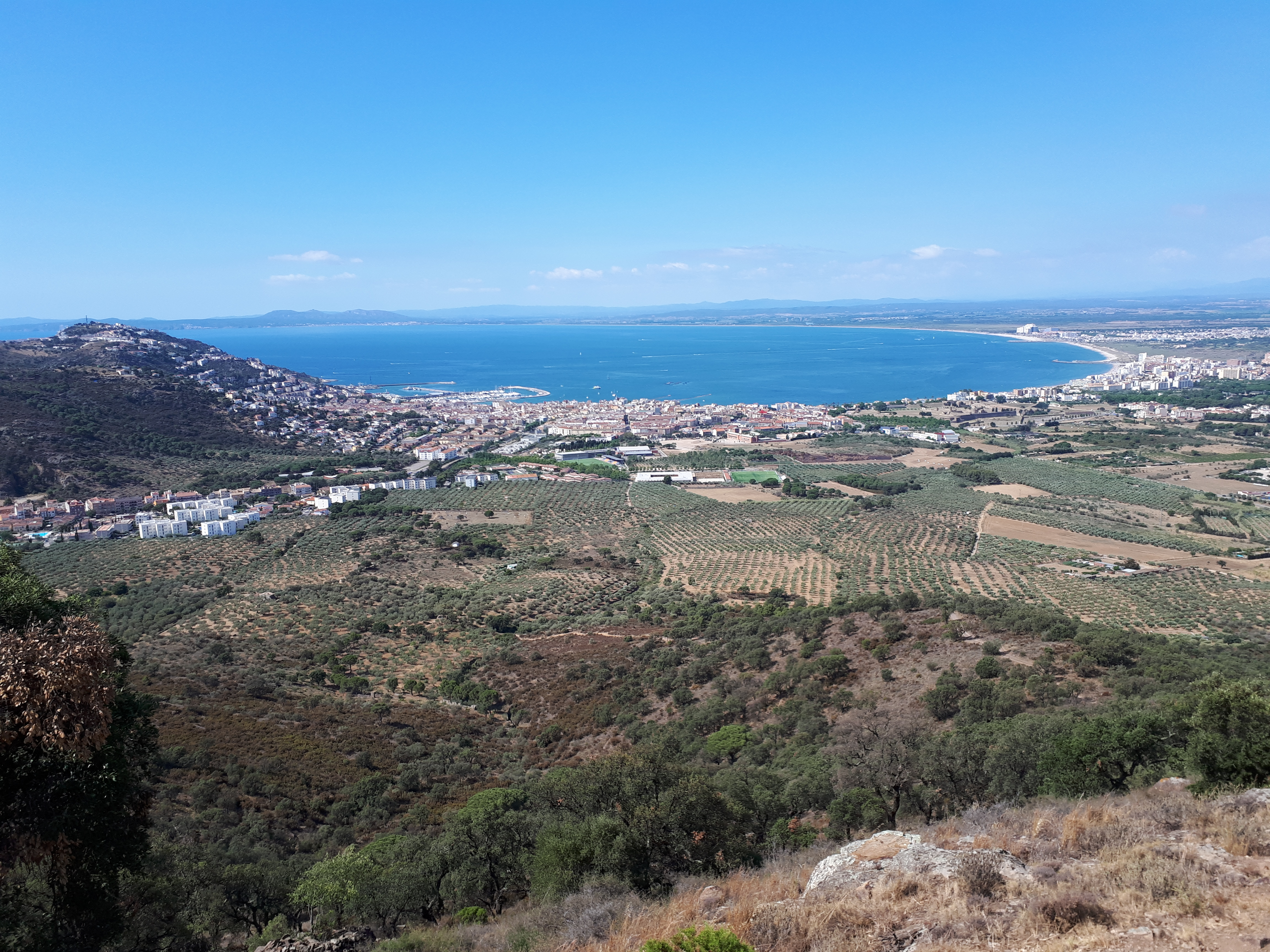
Roses and the Gulf of Roses, from Puig d'en Massot

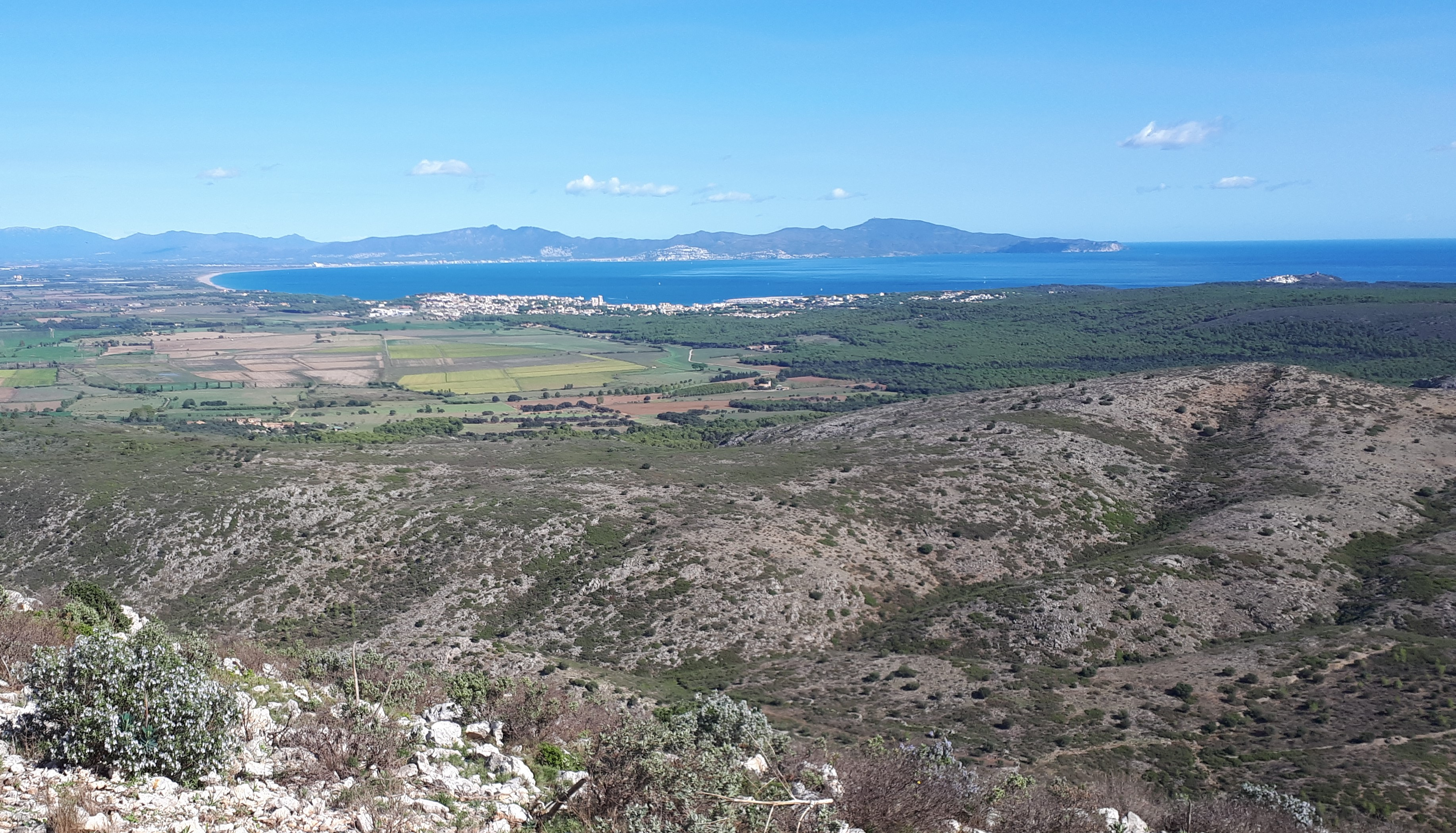
The Gulf of Roses, seen from the south.

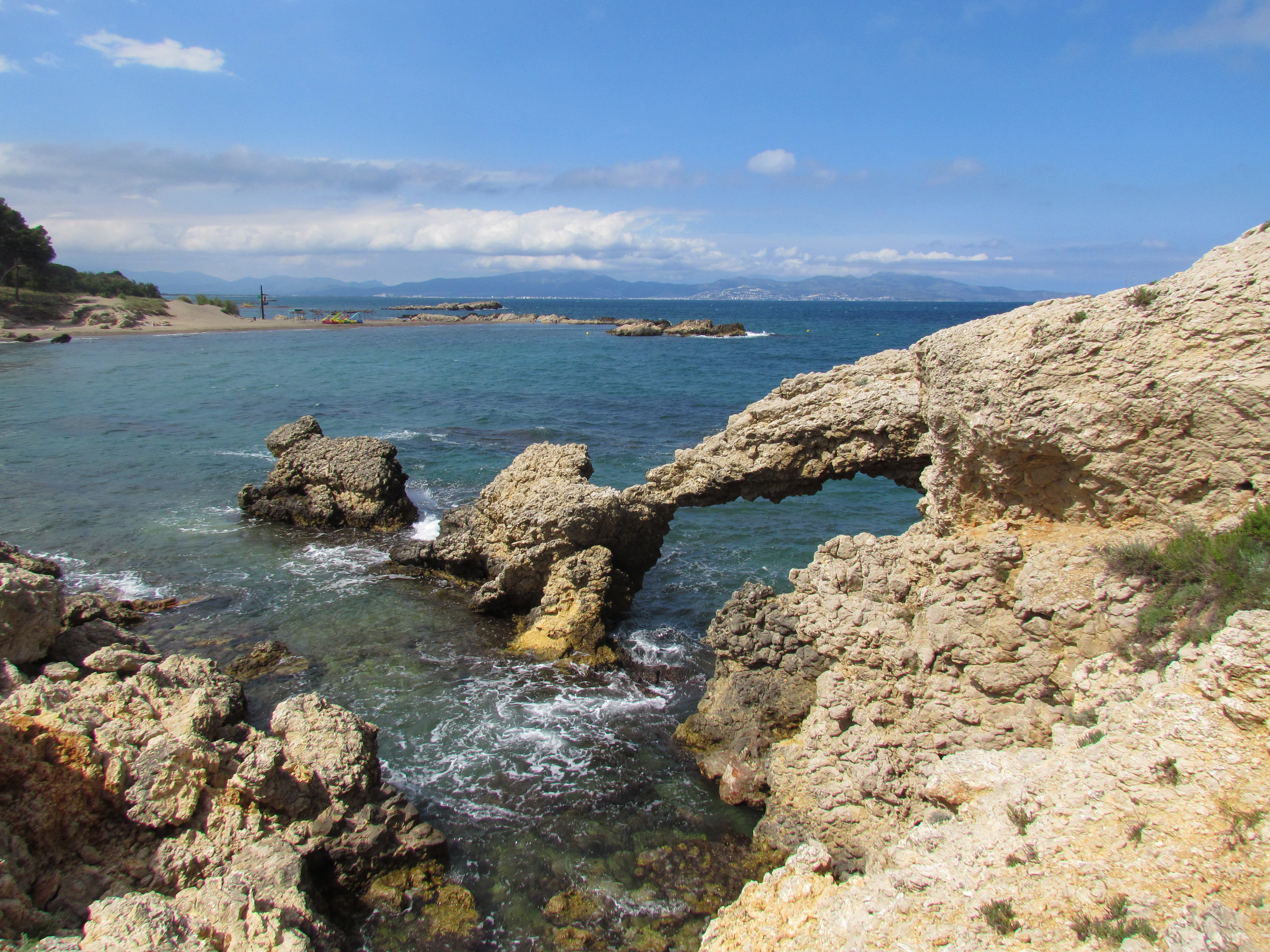
View from the Costa Brava
