= Nouvilas =

Nouvilas is a Spanish surname. People with the name include:

- José de Nouvilas de Vilar (1856–1931), Mayor of Ponce, Puerto Rico
- Pilar Nouvilas (1854-1938), Spanish painter
- Ramon Nouvilas, Spanish military figure and Minister of War
