= Basílica de Santa Maria de Castelló d'Empúries =

Coordinates: 42°15′34.22″N 3°4′33.19″E

The Santa Maria Basilica
- Santa Maria de Castelló d'Empúries (Catalan)
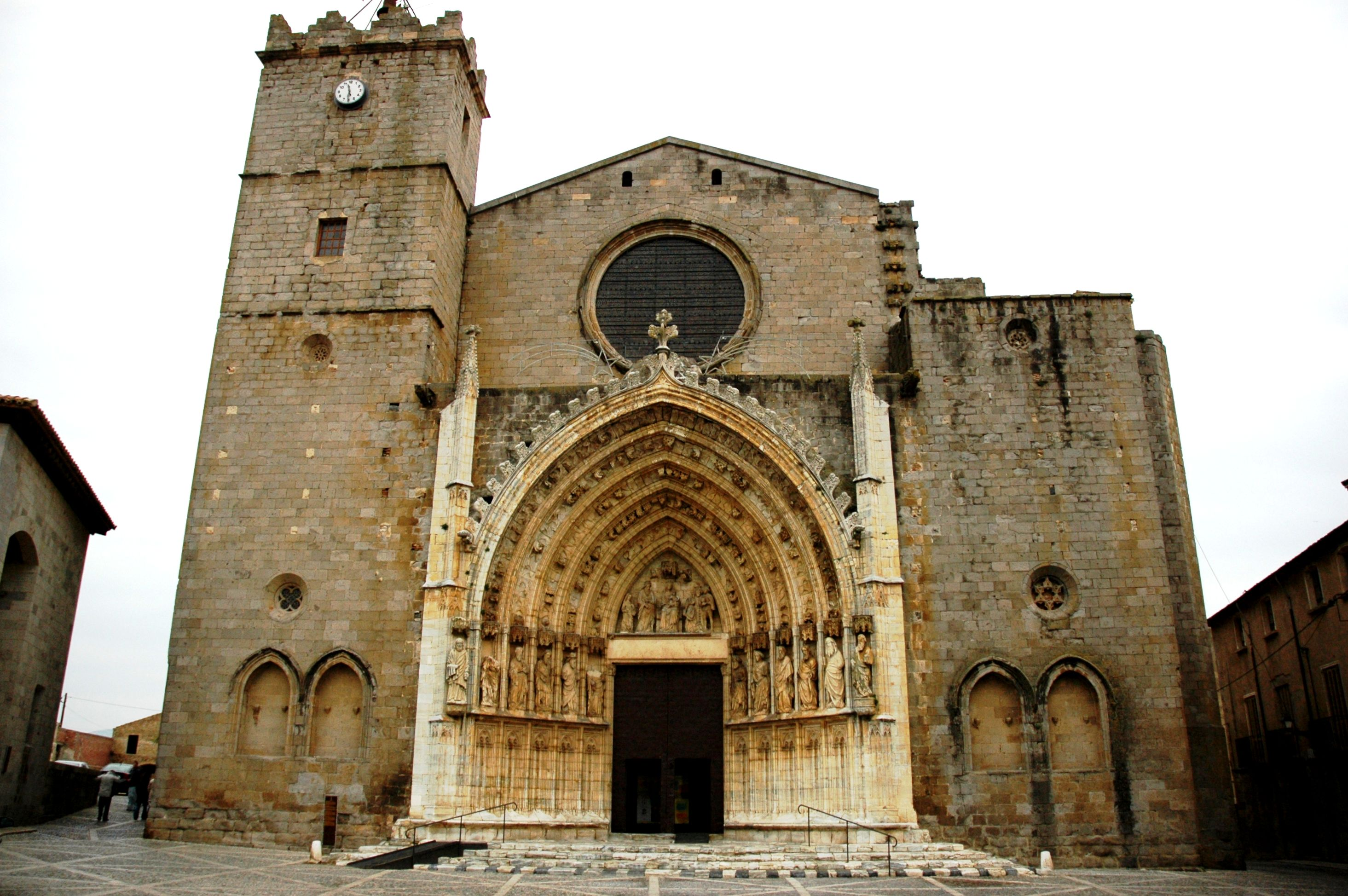

- Location within Catalonia
- Location: Castelló d'Empúries, Girona, Catalonia, Spain

History
- Built: 13th-15th century

Site notes
- Architect: Ramón de Xartres
- Architectural style: Gothic

Spanish Cultural Heritage
- Official name: Basílica de Santa Maria de Castelló d'Empúries
- Type: Non-movable
- Criteria: Monument
- Designated: 3 June 1931
- Reference no.: RI-51-0000569

The Santa Maria Basilica (the Basílica de Santa Maria de Castelló d'Empúries, or the Catedral de l'Empordà or the Catedral de Castelló d'Empúries (in Catalan)), located in the municipality of Castelló d'Empúries in Girona, Catalonia, Spain, has for centuries been regarded as the Empordà Cathedral, although papal authorities have never granted it this rank. The building is the second largest in the Costa Brava, after the Girona Cathedral, and is big enough to justify cathedral status. It is a Gothic building begun in the thirteenth century that replaced a primitive Romanesque church from the tenth century. A few vestiges of this building remain, such as the first floors of the bell tower and the grant baptismal. It was completed in the fifteenth century, when the marble facade and the alabaster altarpiece of the main altar were finished. It contains a museum known as El Tresor, which contains a large collection of religious jewelry.

The church is dedicated to the Virgin of Candelera.

== History ==
After the destruction of Empúries, Castelló became the county seat, with the transfer of the Counts of Empúries to the villa. Thus, the site became a strategically defensive zone surrounded by walls. The counts wanted the village to be the base of the episcopal seat of the Empordà, which would explain its monumentality.

A document from 1007 first made mention of a Romanesque church dedicated to Santa Maria established in the hamlet of Castelló d'Empúries. This was a purchase made by the Bishop of Girona Odó, from spouses Tedmar and Truitela, a Castelló freehold property comprising several mounds, two lagoons, and two lakes called "Ded" and "Bona Conca". The property was limited, at different points, by Sancta Maria de Castilione territories. This Romanesque church was consecrated in 1064.

The Catalan Gothic style structure, which was built in the same location as the first Romanesque church, was directed by the architect Ramón de Xartres, and construction began on 13 February 1261, during the time of Count Ponç IV of Empúries. Its architectural structure was finished early in the fifteenth century, when the facade was built, with the grand marble portal. The side altars were built, and the alabaster altarpiece of the main altar was designed. It has the structure and dimensions of a cathedral, a status which it never attained despite several efforts spearheaded by the counts of Empúries.

During the seventeenth and eighteenth centuries, two side chapels, the Puríssima Sang (Immaculate Heart) and Nostra Senyora dels Dolors (Our Lady of Sorrows), were added.

== Structure ==
Built with a hall church design, a method introduced to Spain by Cistercian monks, it is composed of three buildings, a wider central and two lateral ones. The laterals are unusual in that their height is different from the central plant in some sections.

The structure of the hall church is rectangular with framed side chapels between the buttresses, surmounted by drainage gargoyles, which support the side walls. In the header and in the first two sections, including the lower side aisles, the abutments are complemented by buttresses. Each of the three naves of the plant is made up of nine ogive vaults supported by pillars, with elements typical of this type of construction: rainbow arches and the four ribs that are joined at a keystone.

The large windows in the apse of the church were of stained glass. Today, only one remains; the others were covered with sheets of translucent alabaster.

The high altar is a made of consecrated stone more than three meters long, supported by five columns, and it is used for services to celebrate mass. It had been placed in the chancel, on the other side of the iron gate, but in 1973 it was moved to its present location, closer to the faithfuls.

The front cover features a large main stone from the fifteenth century, attributed to master builder Antoni Antigó, and is divided into three sections: two bell towers and a central body. This central part has the portal, framed between two pinnacles. Its beauty consists of six archivolts which delimit the tympanum and the pediment. The Adoration of the Magi is represented in the tympanum. The six archivolts are topped by twelve niches that house the twelve apostles. All sculptures are carved with great perfection and attention to detail. Under the niches, there is a socket with blind windows resting on a bench. On top of the cover and occupying the top of the central body, there is a large Gothic rosette, which supplies light to the interior of the temple. The bell tower (from the twelfth or thirteenth) stands on the north side. It is a tower divided into five floors with a height of 36 meters that follows the architectural design of the Lombard influenced bell towers.
