= Aiguamolls de l'Empordà =

Natural park near Girona, Spain

- IUCN category V (protected landscape/seascape)
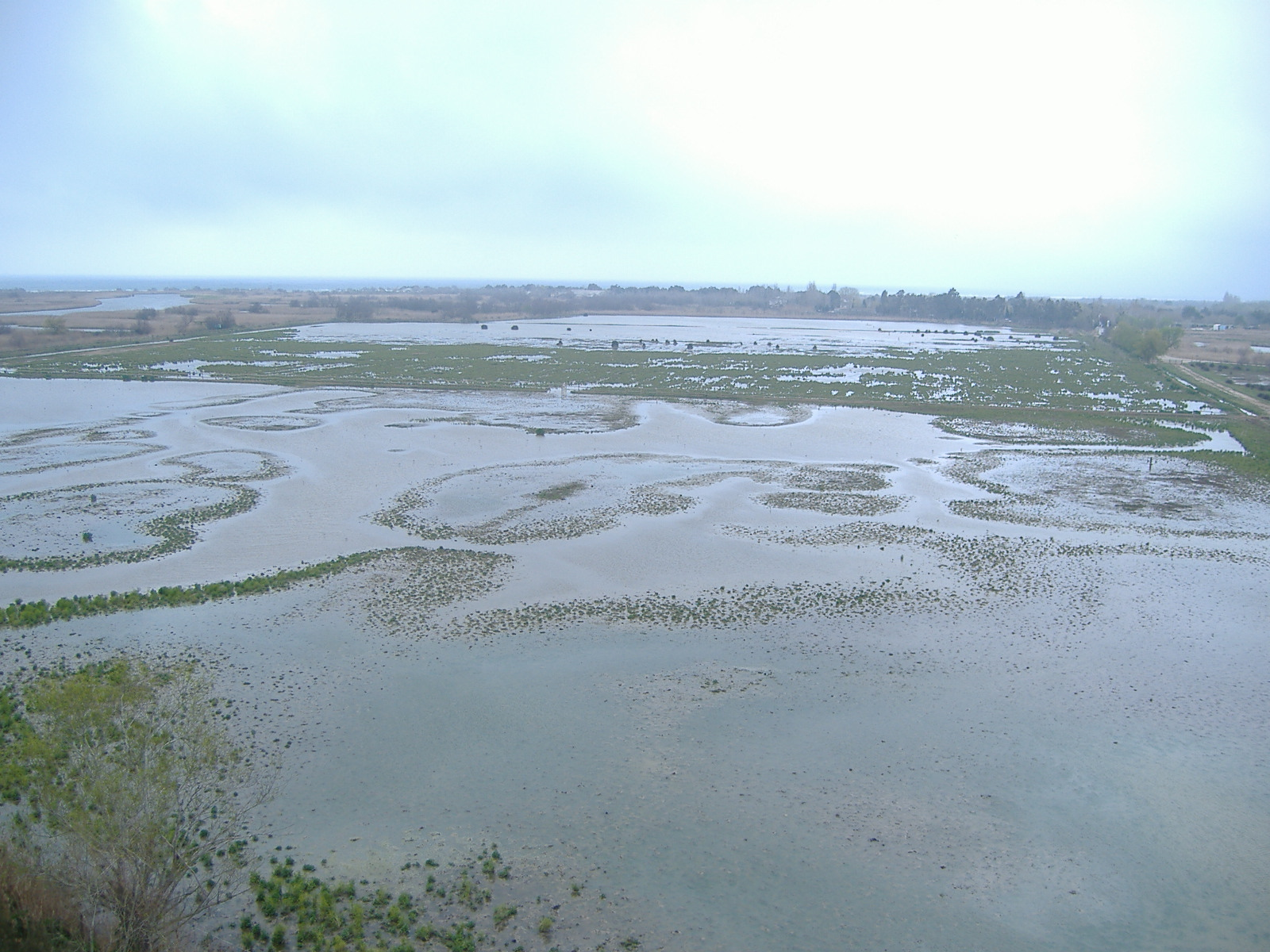
- Wetlands of Aiguamolls de l'Empordà
- Interactive map of Aiguamolls de l'Empordà
- Location: Empordà, Catalonia, Spain
- Coordinates: 42°13′10″N 3°6′38″E
- Area: 4,824 hectares (48.24 km^{2})
- Established: 1983
- Governing body: Departament de Medi Ambient i Habitatge

Ramsar Wetland
- Designated: 26 March 1993
- Reference no.: 592

The Parc Natural dels Aiguamolls de l'Empordà is a natural park in Catalonia, Spain. It forms part of the Bay of Roses and, like the Ebro Delta, was a malarial swampland. The marshland lies between the Rivers Fluvià and Muga. It is the second largest wetland in Catalonia at over 4,800 hectares and was established in 1983.

During the 19th century, much of the marsh was drained as canals were created and the land converted to agriculture. However, virgin marsh and dunes remained and was given Natural Park status in the 1980s after a campaign to save the area from development.

The park accommodates 327 different species. Great spotted cuckoo, spoonbill, nightingale, collared pratincole and stone-curlew are among its many birds. The park offers seven hides and one tower for bird watchers. They are connected through a plain dirt track which allows wheelchairs.

The GR 92 long distance footpath, which roughly follows the length of the Mediterranean coast of Spain, passes through the park and has a staging point at the El Cortalet pond. Stage 4 links northwards to Roses, a distance of 16.3 kilometres (10.1 mi), whilst stage 5 links southwards to Sant Martí d'Empúries, a distance of 20.2 kilometres (12.6 mi).

== Fauna and Flora ==
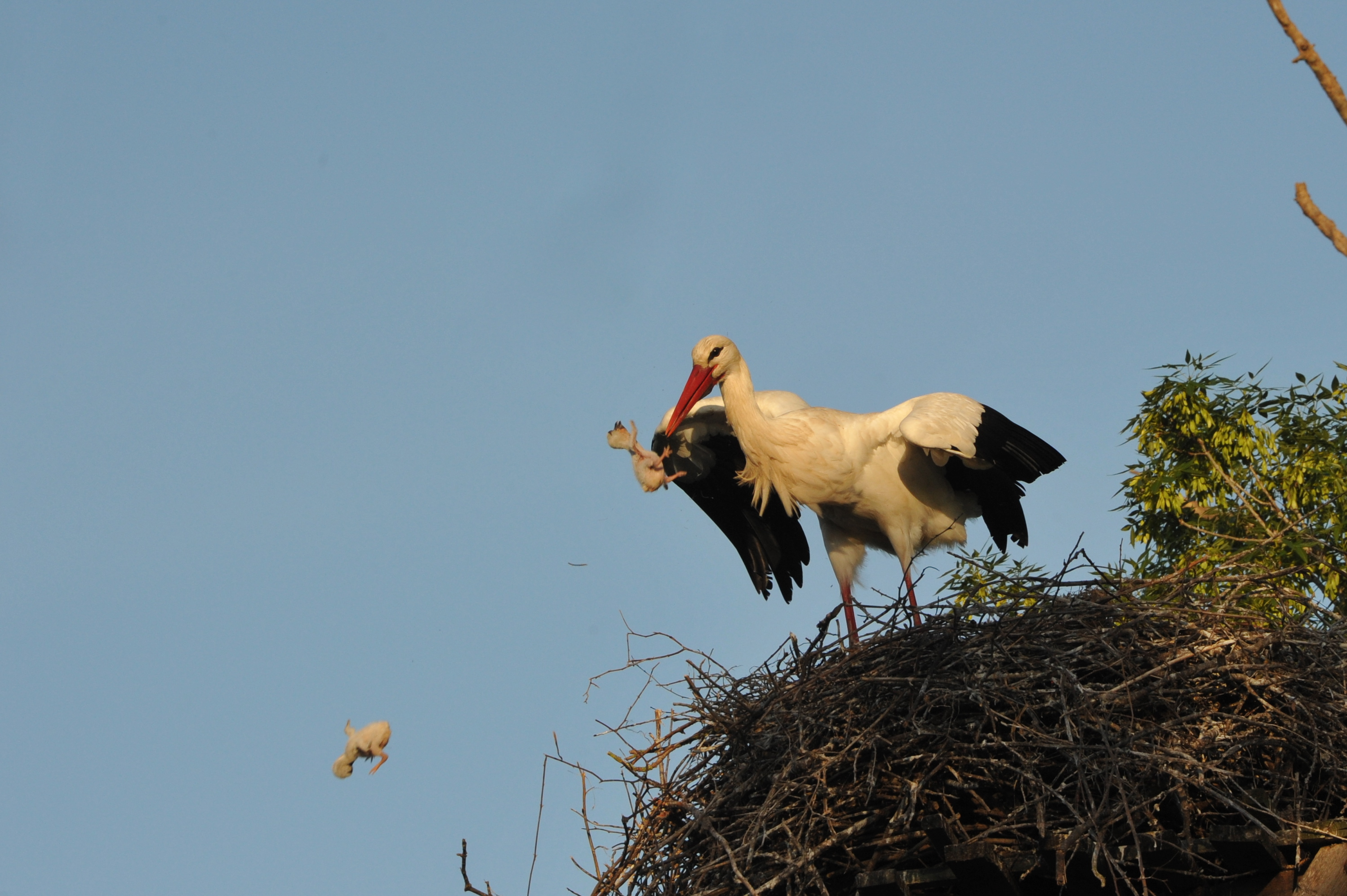
A white stork (Ciconia ciconia) throwing offspring out of the nest near El Cortalet.

The typical plants of the salt, brackish and freshwater zones of the Aiguamolls include, in particular, the marsh bristlegrass, the marram grass in the shore zones facing the Mediterranean Sea and the seaweed (Salicornia europaea).

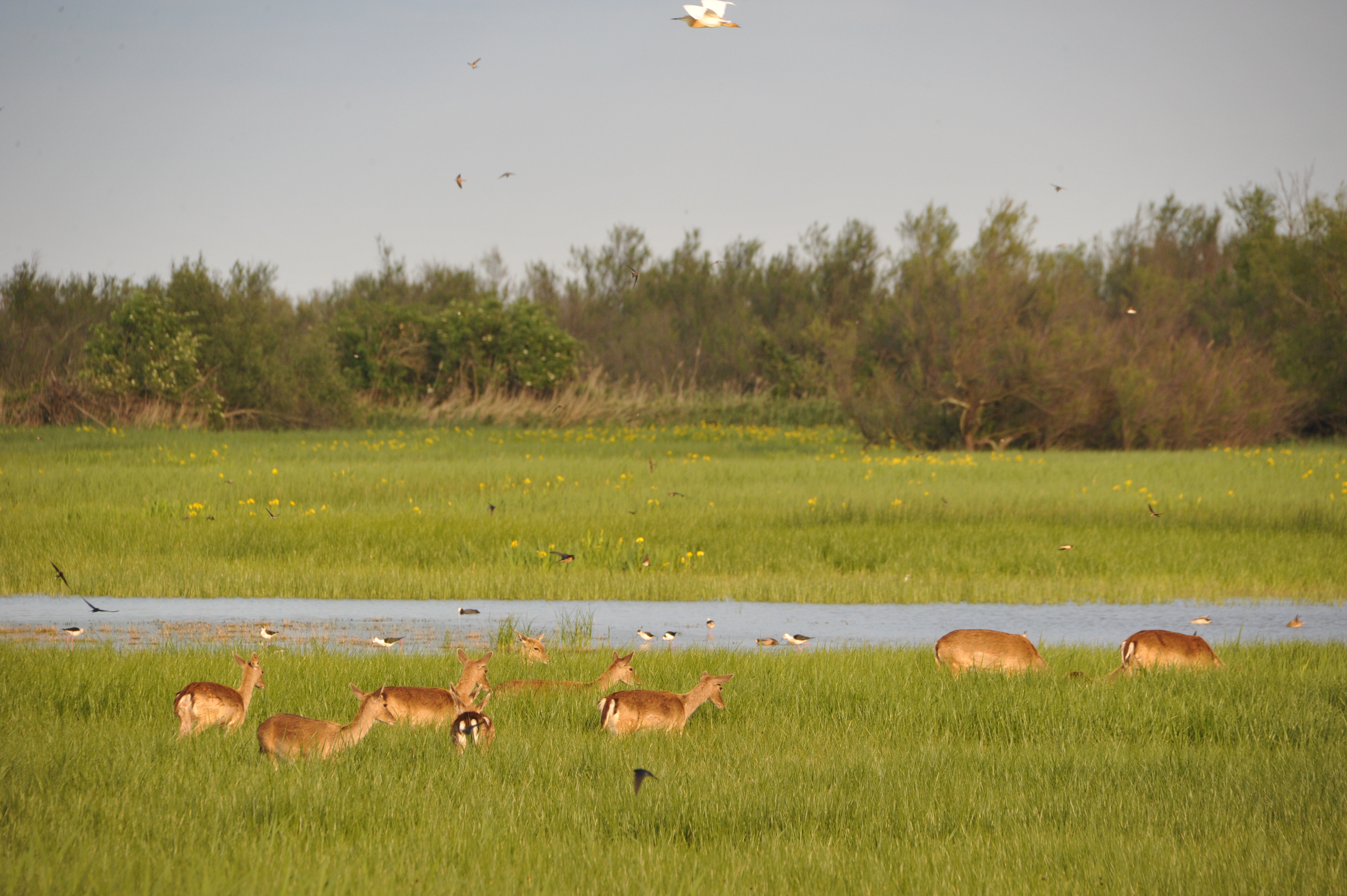
A herd of fallow deer at El Cortalet in Aiguamolls.

Among the fish species, the three-spined stickleback (Gasterosteus aculeatus) and the Spanish carp (Aphanius iberus) are endemic to the Aiguamolls de l'Empordà.

The Eurasian otter (Lutra lutra) and the white stork (Ciconia ciconia), among others, have been successfully established as permanent residents in the extensive zones of the nature park. For the storks, large nest colonies have been established on the site, consisting of wooden nest frames on poles, which the birds also prefer to use for building their nests.

Camargue horses find a natural habitat in the Aiguamolls de l'Empordà, as do, for example, the wild boar (Sus scrofa) and herds of female fallow deer (Dama dama) who are joined by the males in the rutting season in fall.

Furthermore, bee-eaters (Merops apiaster) and the European roller, can be spotted on a regular basis, which have become very rare in Europe.

In the migratory seasons, the Caspian tern, Eurasian dotterel and Western yellow wagtail and sandpiper can be found. This ornithological species richness is particularly effective in the Parc Natural dels Aiguamolls de l'Empordà, because numerous migratory birds prefer to use the food-rich and protected wetland between the two estuaries as a resting area.
