= Sant Martí d'Empúries =

- Municipality
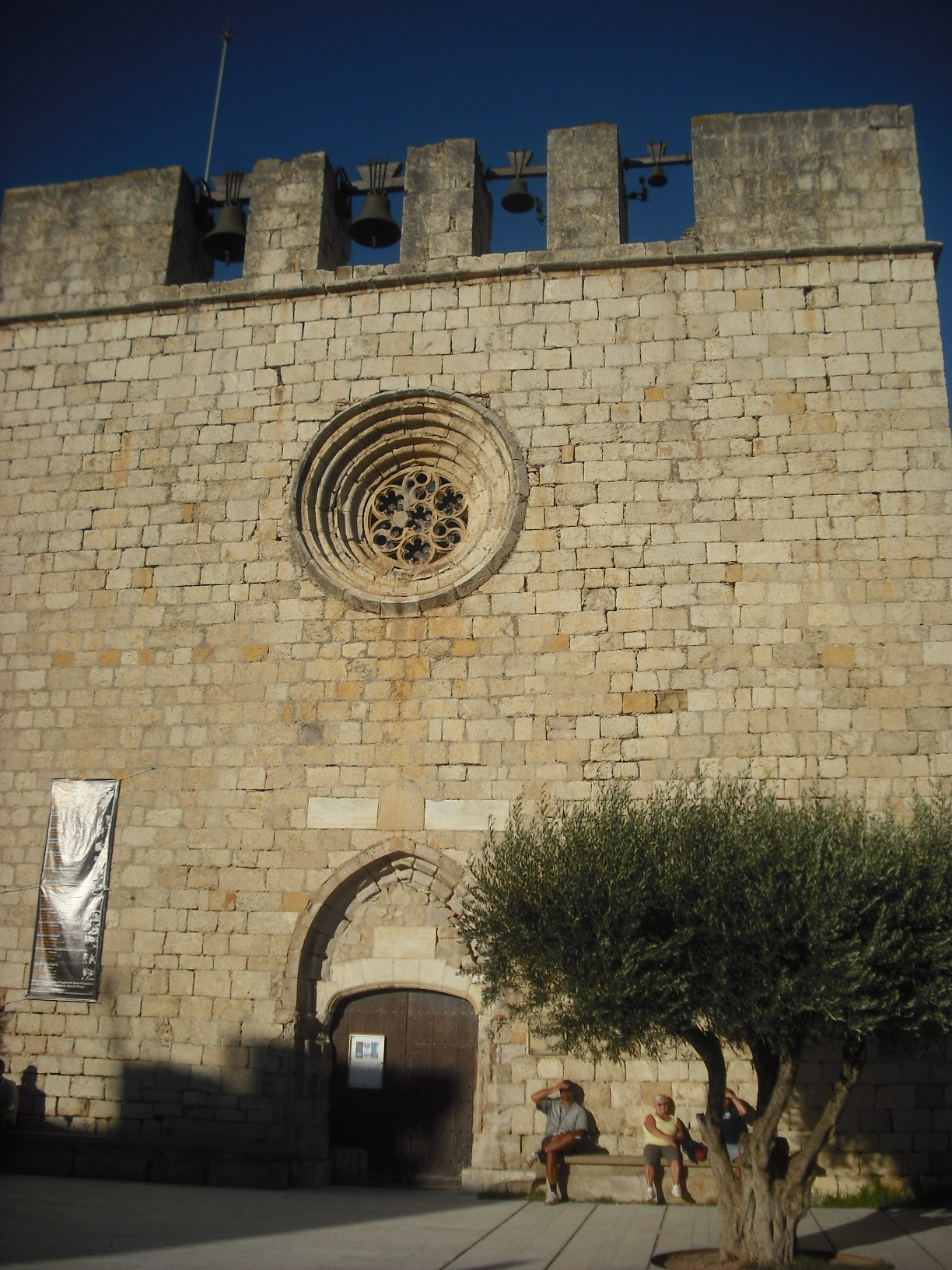
- Church of Sant Martí Empúries

- Flag

- Location in Catalonia
- Coordinates: 42°8′23.59″N 3°7′4.48″E
- Country: Spain
- Community: Catalonia
- Province: Girona
- Comarca: Alt Empordà

Population (2009)
  - Total: 61
- Time zone: UTC+1 (CET)
  - Summer (DST): UTC+2 (CEST)
- Postal code: 17130
- Website: Official website

Sant Martí d'Empúries is an entity of the town of L'Escala. It is located next to the ruins of Empúries or Empòrion. Ancient Greeks established the settlement in the 6th century BC. It was the county seat until 1079 Empúries moved to Castelló d'Empúries place less exposed to attack.

Sant Martí d'Empúries is a staging point on the GR 92 long distance footpath, which roughly follows the length of the Mediterranean coast of Spain. Stage 5, to the north, takes a route behind the coast to the El Cortalet pond in the Parc Natural dels Aiguamolls de l'Empordà, a distance of 20.2 kilometres (12.6 mi). Stage 6, to the south, follows the coast to l'Escala and then takes an inland route across the Montgri Massif to reach the next staging point of Torroella de Montgrí, a distance of 20.0 kilometres (12.4 mi).

== History ==
It was an inhabited place since the arrival of Greeks from Massalia, actual Marseille (France) in the 6th century BC. Greeks established a settlement there called it, Kypsela (Greek: Κύψελα). At the ancient times there is a possibility that there was a temple of Artemis on the island.

It was Christianized by Saint Feliu, an African martyr who died in 304 in Girona. He was bishop between 516 and 693. Charlemagne mentions Ermenguer as first Count of Empúries in 812.
