= Castelló d'Empúries =

- Municipality
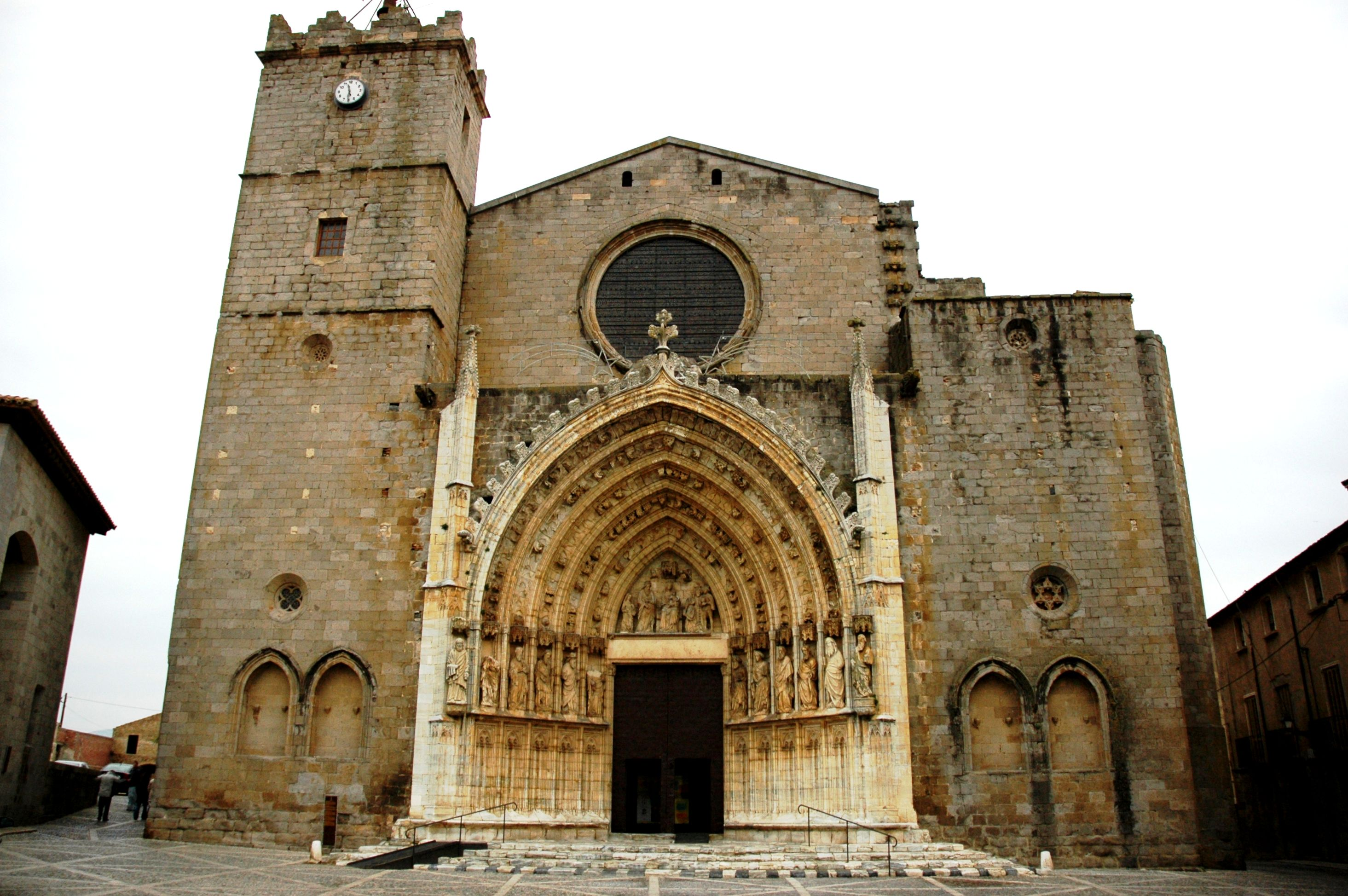
- Santa Maria de Castelló

- Flag Coat of arms

- Location in Catalonia Castelló d'Empúries (Catalonia) Castelló d'Empúries (Spain)
- Coordinates: 42°15′30″N 3°4′30″E
- Country: Spain
- Community: Catalonia
- Province: Girona
- Comarca: Alt Empordà

Government
  - Mayor: Anna Massot i Font

Area
  - Total: 42.3 km^{2} (16.3 sq mi)

Population (2025-01-01)
  - Total: 12,201
  - Density: 288/km^{2} (747/sq mi)
- Website: www.castello.cat

Castelló d'Empúries (Catalan pronunciation: [kəstəˈʎo ðəmˈpuɾiəs]) is a town and municipality in the Alt Empordà in Girona, Catalonia, Spain. It lies 9 km east of Figueres.

== History ==
In 1079, Castelló d'Empúries became the capital of the Empúries county due to the previous capital, Sant Martí d'Empúries, being too easily sacked by pirates.

The old town is somewhat dwarfed by the neighboring urbanisation of Empuriabrava, on the coastline of the Costa Brava.

== Notable people ==
- Pilar Nouvilas (1854–1938), painter
- Ramón Nouvilas (1812–1880), military figure

== See also ==
- County of Empúries
- Empúries
- Empuriabrava
