= L'Escala =

- Municipality
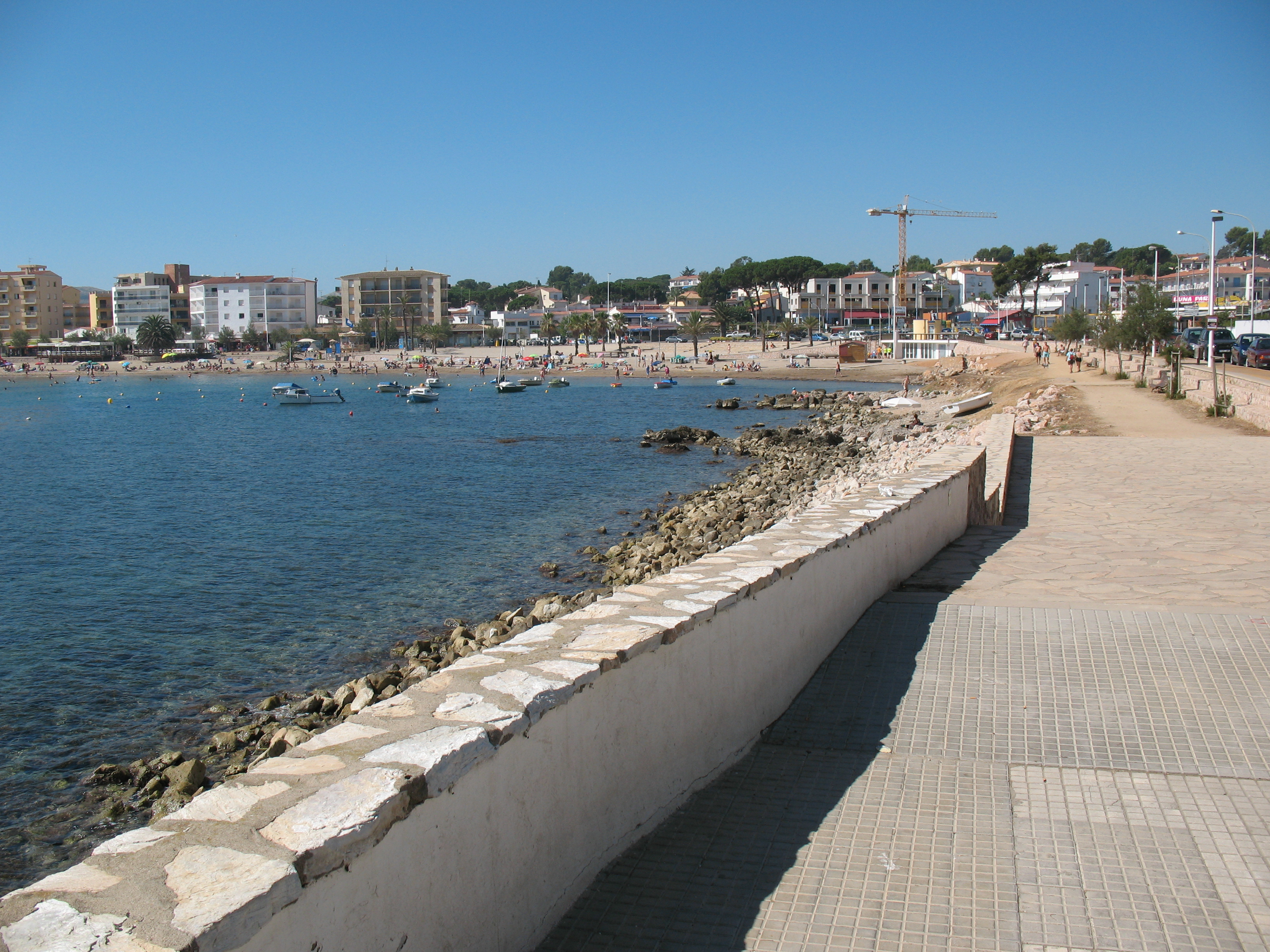

- Flag Coat of arms

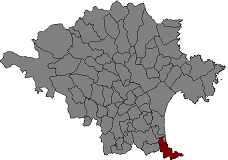

- Location in Catalonia L'Escala (Spain)
- Coordinates: 42.114°N 3.139°E
- Country: Spain
- Autonomous community: Catalonia
- Province: Girona
- Comarca: Alt Empordà

Government
  - Alcalde: Josep Bofill (PSC)(2023)

Area
  - Total: 16.3 km^{2} (6.3 sq mi)
- Elevation: 14 m (46 ft)

Population (2025-01-01)
  - Total: 10,374
  - Density: 636/km^{2} (1,650/sq mi)
- Demonym: escalenc/escalenca
- Time zone: UTC+1 (CET)
  - Summer (DST): UTC+2 (CEST)
- Postal code: 17130
- Website: lescala-empuries.com

L'Escala (Catalan pronunciation: [ləsˈkalə]) is a municipality in the comarca of the Alt Empordà in Girona, Catalonia, Spain. It is situated on the Costa Brava, located between the southern end of the Gulf of Roses and Cala (bay) Montgó. It is an important fishing port and tourist centre, and has a festival dedicated to its famous anchovies. The GE-513 road runs inland from the town.

The Alfolí de la Sal, also known as the Pòsit Vell, is a seventeenth-century warehouse formerly used to store the salt necessary to preserve fish landed at the port: it is now a protected historic-artistic monument. The ruins of Empúries are located on the territory of the municipality, with Phoenician and Roman remains dating from 580 BC.

L'Escala is the village of Víctor Català (pseudonym of Caterina Albert, 1869-1966) a famous novelist.

The GR 92 long distance footpath, which roughly follows the length of the Mediterranean coast of Spain, passes through L'Escala on its stage between Sant Martí d'Empúries and Torroella de Montgrí.

== Demography ==
| 1900 | 1930 | 1950 | 1970 | 1986 | 2001 | 2009 |
|---|---|---|---|---|---|---|
| 2515 | 2462 | 2475 | 3117 | 4721 | 5823 | 10.140 |
