= Ramón Nouvilas =

Spanish military figure and Minister of War

Ramon Nouvilas
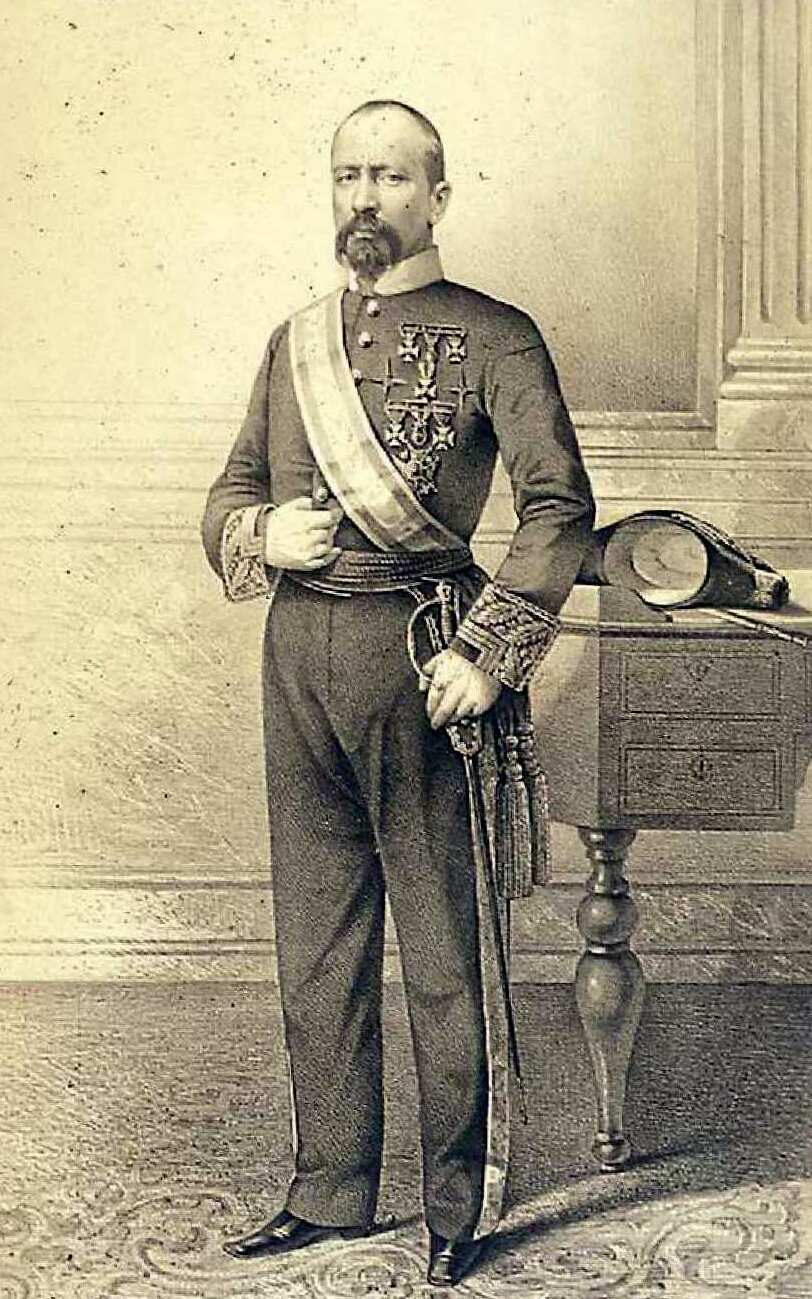
- Lithograph by Rufino Casado, illustration of the General Staff of the Spanish Army, by Pedro Chamorro y Baquerizo. National Library of Spain.

Spanish Minister of War
- In office April 30, 1873 – June 7, 1873
- President: Estanislao Figueras
- Preceded by: Juan Acosta Muñoz
- Succeeded by: Nicolás Estévanez

Member of the Congress of Deputies
- In office September 19, 1872 – January 8, 1874

Captain General of Catalonia
- In office 1868–1869
- Preceded by: Joaquim de Bassols i de Maranyosa
- Succeeded by: Eugenio de Gaminde y Lafont

Personal details
- Born: December 18, 1812 Castelló d'Empúries, Catalonia, Spain
- Died: May 30, 1880 (aged 67) Madrid, Community of Madrid, Spain

Military service
- Allegiance: Spain
- Branch: Spanish Army
- Years of service: 1833 — 1876
- Battles/wars: First Carlist War; Glorious Revolution; Third Carlist War

Ramón Nouvilas y Rafols (1812–1880) was a Spanish military figure and Minister of War from April 30, 1873, to June 7 of the same year.

== Biography ==
He began his military career by intervening on the various fronts of the First Carlist War, in which he suffered seven gunshot wounds and was promoted on war merits to the rank of lieutenant colonel. Later he participated in the unsuccessful assault on the Royal Palace of Madrid by means of which those pronounced in 1841 against Baldomero Espartero tried to seize the queen and her sister, still girls, to put an end to the regency, for which he had to go into exile in France. Back in Spain in June 1843, after the fall of Espartero, he was promoted to colonel and, at the head of the Castile Regiment, he fought the Carlist and Republican parties raised in Galicia and Catalonia, where in 1849 he faced Cabrera until his final retirement and was promoted to quarterback. Minister of the Supreme Court of War and Navy in 1862, in 1866 he was exiled to the Canary Islands for his participation in the revolutionary attempts led by Juan Prim. He took an active part in the triumph of the Revolution of 1868, after which he was appointed first Captain General of Andalusia and, later, of Catalonia, with the rank of Lieutenant General. He was elected senator for the province of Murcia for the legislature 1871–1872, in his parliamentary activity he was interested in the oath to King Amadeo of Savoy and the fate of the military who had refused to lend it. On August 24, 1872, he was elected deputy for the district of Seo de Urgel and re-elected on May 10, 1873, elections in which out of 2,511 voters he obtained 2,511 votes. He held the seat until the dissolution of the Cortes on January 8, 1874. As a deputy, he was one of those who voted for the proclamation of the republic in 1873. Minister of War with Estanislao Figuera, a position for which he was appointed on 30 April 1873, and general in chief of the Army of the North, directed the military operations aimed at facing the Carlist insurrection but could not prevent the advance of the insurgents and their consolidation with the taking of Estella. On June 7, 1873, he resigned from both positions and resigned from his job in the Army, the resignation not being admitted. He did not accept the dissolution of the Cortes by General Pavía, so on January 17, 1874, he was exiled to the Balearic Islands with four of his children. At the end of 1875 Nouvilas was considered a danger to the monarchy, they were interned in the castle of Santa Catalina in Cádiz and from there he was exiled to Santa Cruz de Tenerife where he remained, with some interruption, until March 1879 when he was allowed to move back to Madrid where his wife was seriously ill.

Nouvilas was also President of the Drafting Board of the General Ordinance of the Army from 1869 to April 1871, he was also the author of some treaties on military tactics and articles in the specialized press, among them Elemental Infantry Tactics, according to the current system of war and advances of weapons, Madrid, 1860, and the light troops in campaign, Madrid, 1869.
