= Pilar Nouvilas =

Spanish painter

- Born: Pilar Nouvilas i Garrigolas; March 6, 1854; Castelló d'Empúries, Spain
- Died: 1938 (aged 83–84); Barcelona, Spain
- Notable work: Sant Francesc de Paula; Bodegó
- Spouse: Eduard de Balle i de Rubinat (m. 1882; died 1912)

Pilar Nouvilas (Castelló d'Empúries, March 6, 1854 - Barcelona, 1938) was a Spanish painter from Catalonia.

== Early life and education ==
Pilar Nouvilas i Garrigolas was born in Castelló d'Empúries. She was the daughter of Josep Anton Nouvilas i Prujulà and Maria Garrigolas i Suró. Her Nouvilas ancestors were Empordà landowners. During her youth, she lived in Castelló d'Empúries. Her family's wealthy status allowed Nouvilas to travel around Europe and train in painting, mainly by copying paintings in the museums she was able to visit.

== Career ==
Between 1877 and 1879, she participated in at least four exhibitions, three at the Girona Art Exhibition and one at the Centro Artístico Industrial Figuerense in Figueres. At the one in 1877, in Girona, she presented a portrait and a landscape, while in the exhibition of 1878 and 1879, she presented the paintings Sant Francesc de Paula and Bodegó.

Unlike other artists, Nouvilas did not want to sell her exhibited works. At that time, few women exhibited; for example, at the exhibition of 1878, there were 55 painters including three women (Nouvilas, Ramona Banquells de Ribó and Boada de Girona). Nouvilas painted still lifes, portraits of people close to her, self-portraits, landscapes, and religious paintings. She painted in oil and watercolor, excelling in color and light, rather than drawing.

== Personal life ==
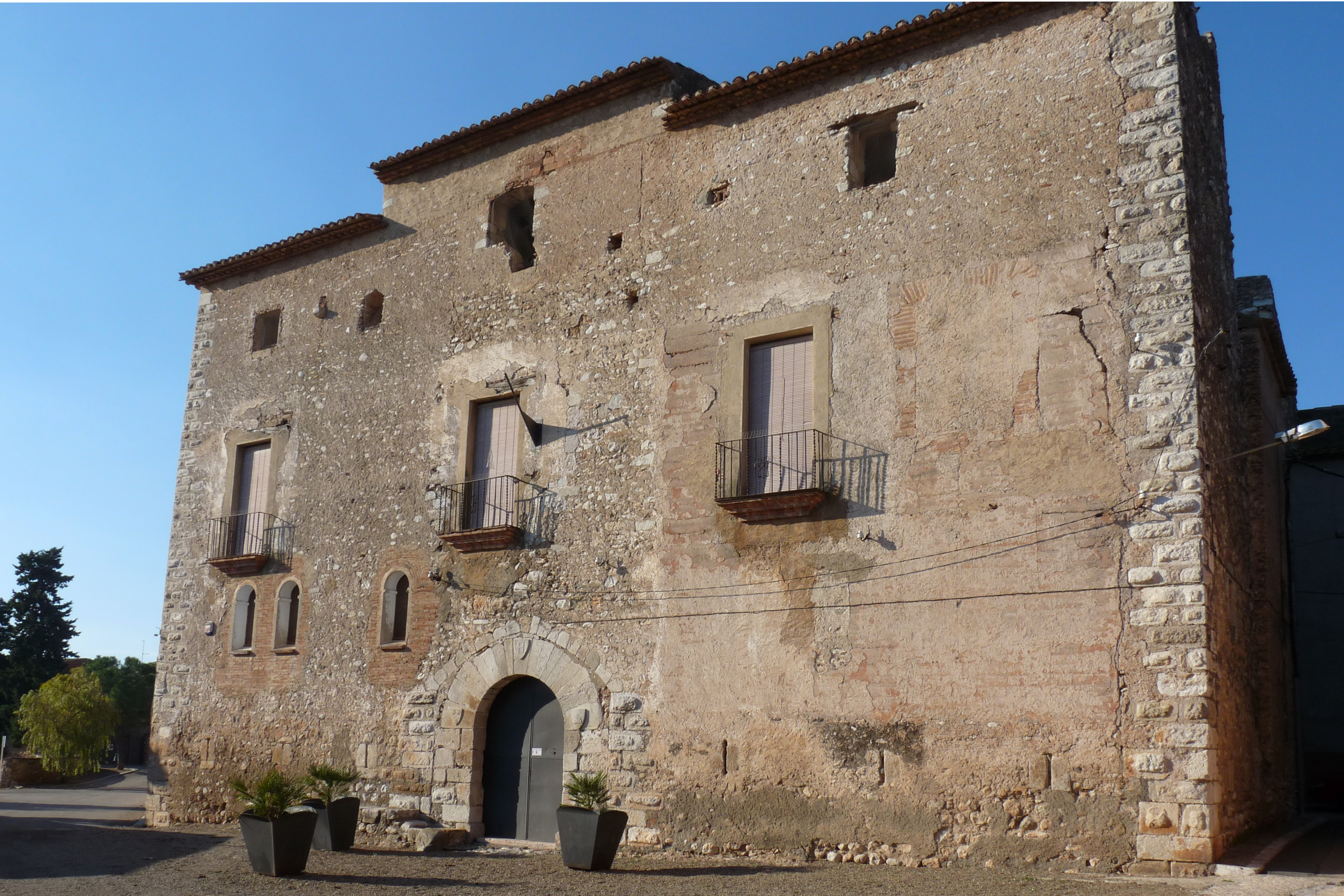
House of the Marquesos de Vallgornera

In 1882, she married Eduard de Balle i de Rubinat, fifth Marquis of Vallgornera, who had inherited a large estate in Olot, El Rourell, and Tarragona subsequent to the death of his older brother. The couple had two children, Eduard de Balle and a daughter who married a diplomat in Mexico. After marriage, Pilar Nouvilas was not known to have exhibited again.
