= Empúries =

Ancient city on the Mediterranean coast in the northeast of the Iberian Peninsula

- Empúries (in Catalan); Ampurias (in Spanish); Ἐμπόριον (Ancient Greek) (in Greek); Emporiae (in Latin)
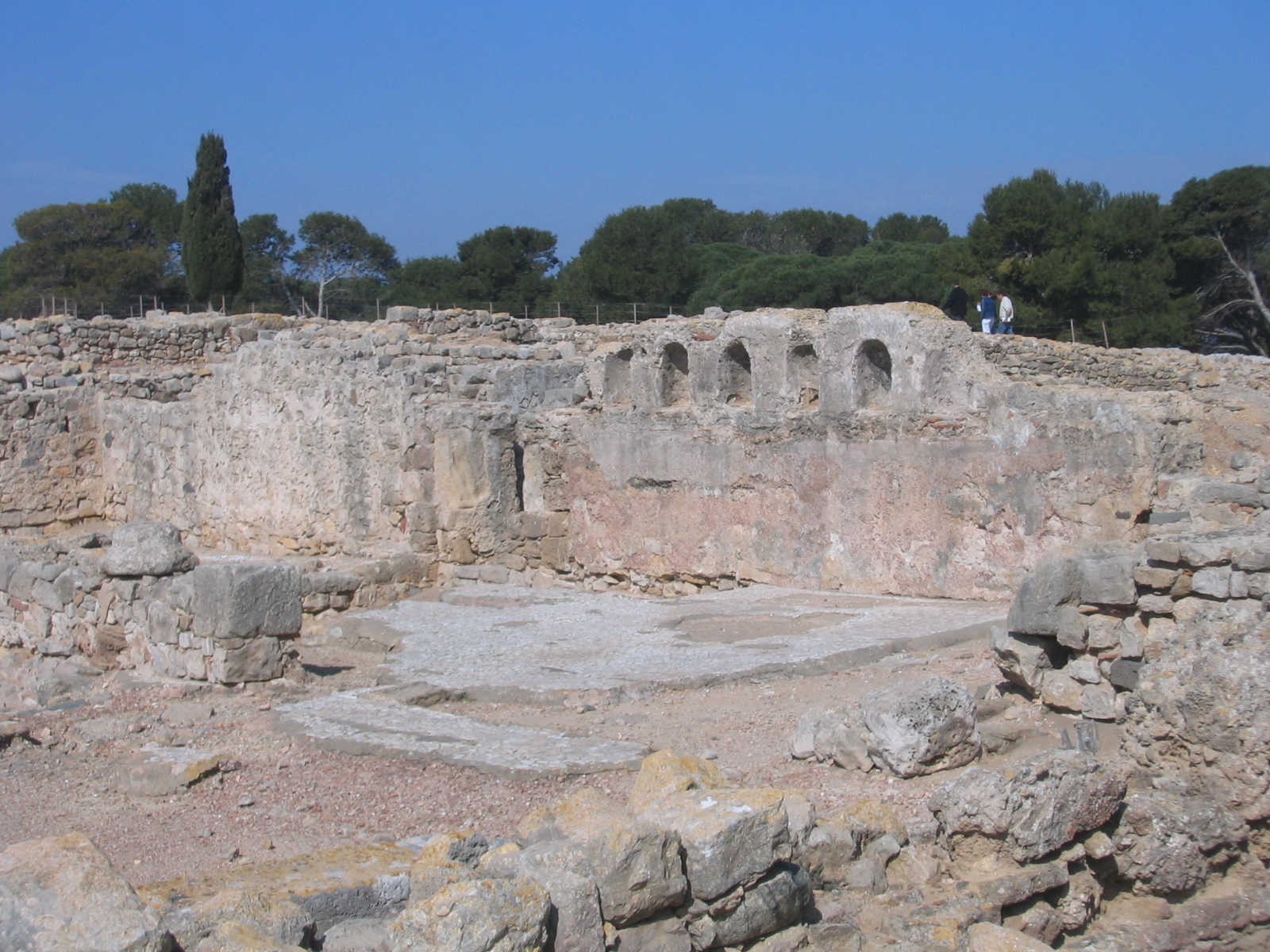
- Palaeochristian basilica at Empúries

- Location within Province of Girona Location within Catalonia Location within Spain
- 42°08′05″N 03°07′14″E
- Type: Settlement
- Periods: Archaic Greek to Early Medieval
- Location: Alt Empordà, Province of Girona, Catalonia, Spain

History
- Built: 575 BC
- Built by: Colonists from Phocaea

Empúries (Catalan: Empúries [əmˈpuɾiəs]) was an ancient Greek city on the Mediterranean coast of Catalonia, Spain. Empúries is also known by its Spanish name, Ampurias (Spanish: Ampurias [amˈpuɾjas]). The city Ἐμπόριον (Greek: Ἐμπόριον, Emporion, meaning "trading place", cf. emporion) was founded in 575 BC by Greeks from Phocaea. The invasion of Gaul from Iberia by Hannibal the Carthaginian general in 218 BC prompted the Romans to occupy the city (Latin: Emporiae), thus initiating the Roman conquest of Hispania. In the Early Middle Ages, the city's exposed coastal position left it open to marauders and it was abandoned.

Empúries is located within the Catalan comarca of Alt Empordà on the Costa Brava. The ruins are midway between the town of L'Escala and the tiny village of Sant Martí d'Empúries.

== History ==
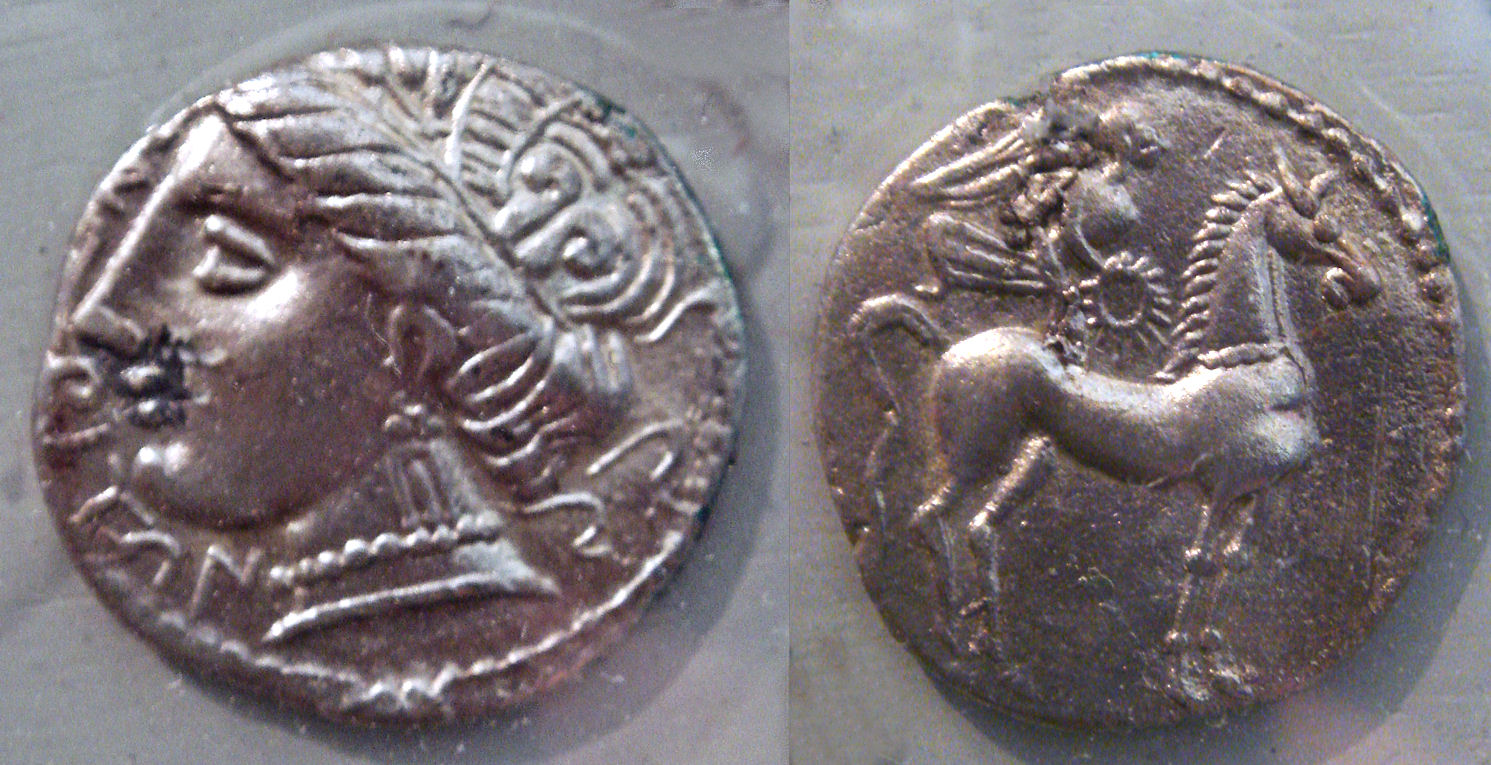
Emporiae coins, 5th-1st century BC.

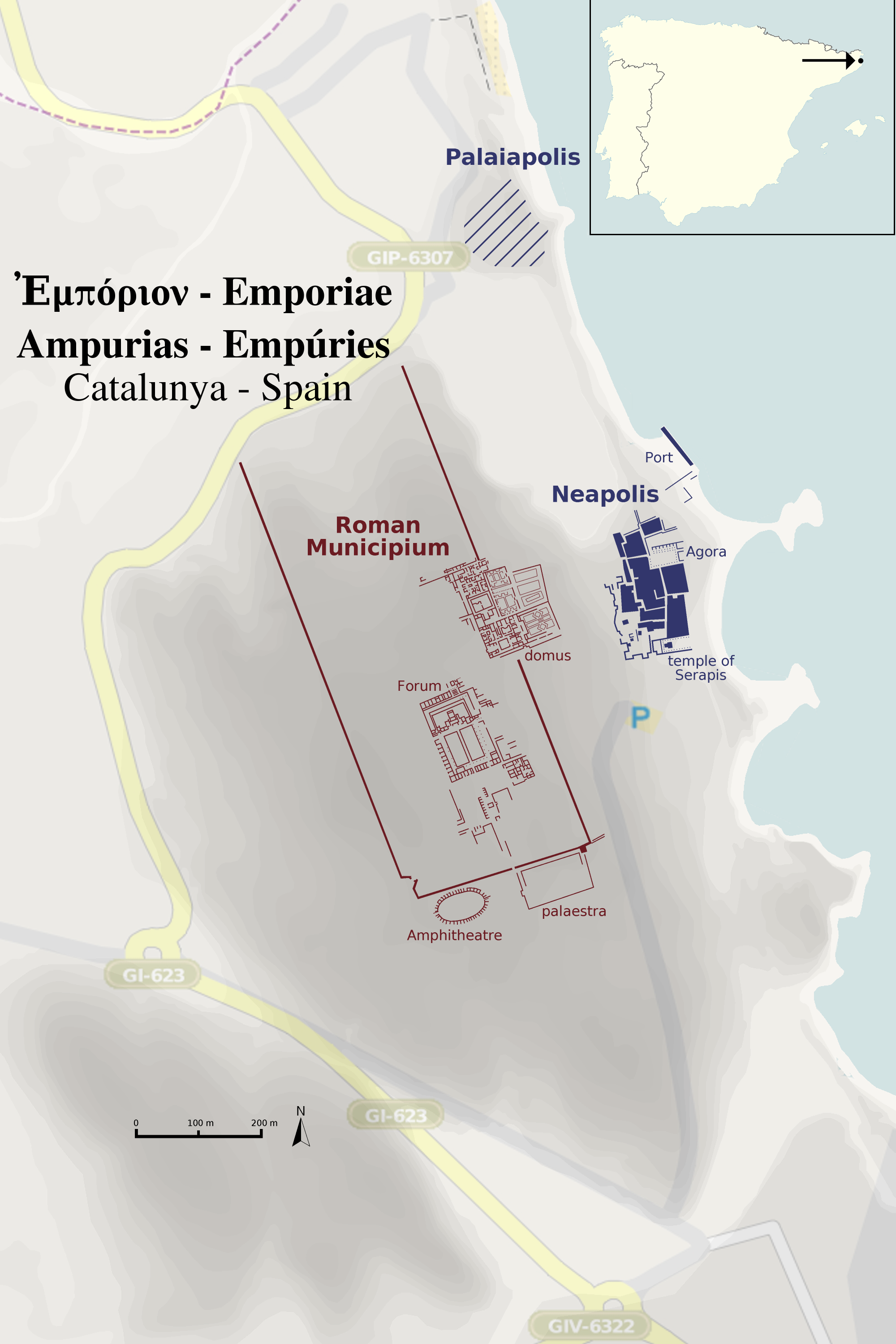
Map of the Ruïnes d’Empúries.

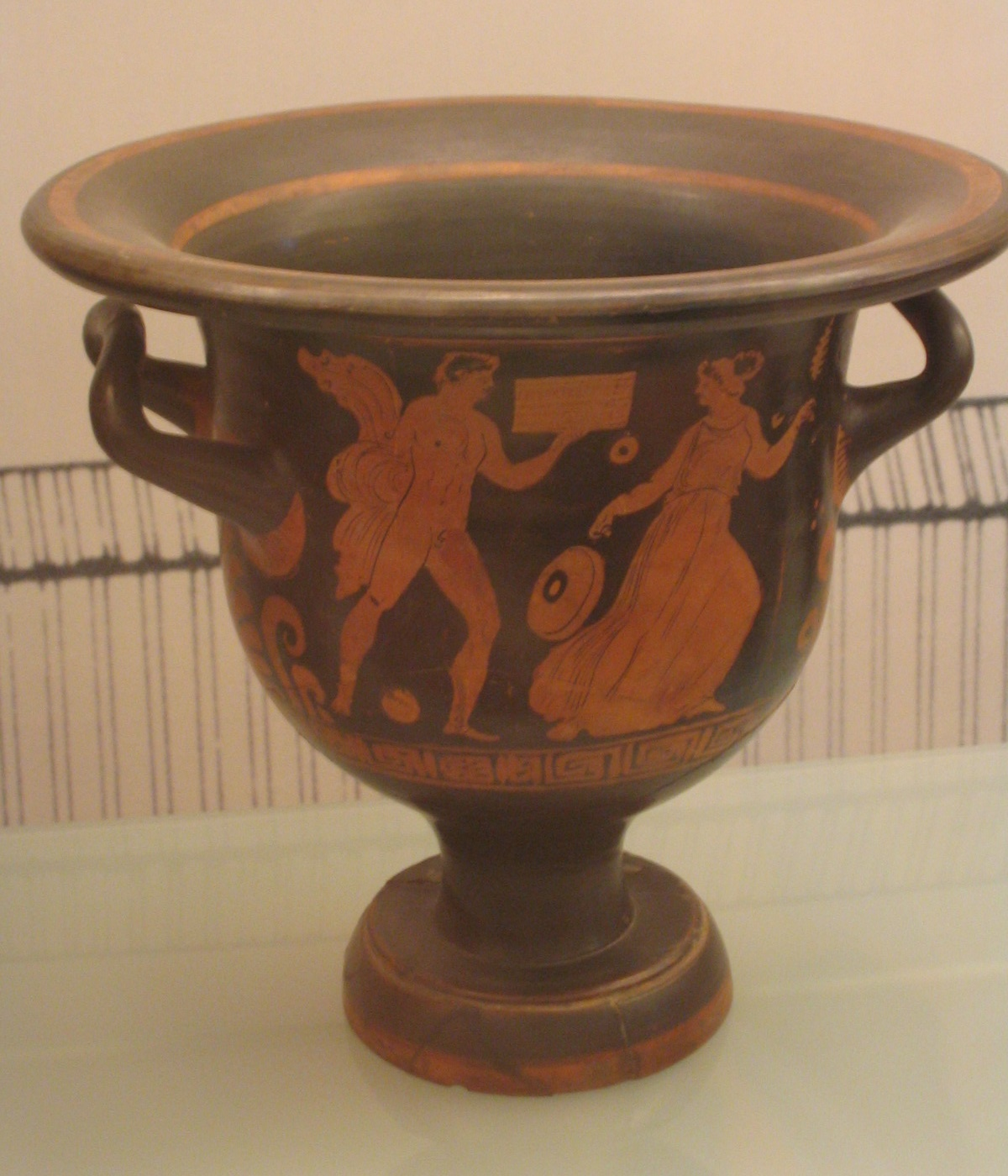
Greek kalyx krater found at Empúries

Empúries was founded on a small island at the mouth of the river Fluvià, in a region inhabited by the Indigetes (at the present time, the mouth of the Fluvià is about 6 km (3.7 mi) to the north. This city came to be known as the Palaiapolis, the "old city," when, towards 550 BC, the inhabitants moved to the mainland, creating the Neapolis, the "new city".

After the conquest of Phocaea by the Persian king Cyrus II in 530 BC, the new city's population increased considerably through the influx of refugees. In the face of strong pressure from Carthage, the city managed to retain its independent Greek character. Political and commercial agreements were concluded with the indigenous population long settled in the nearby city of Indika. Situated as it was on the coastal commercial route between Greek Massalia (Marseille) and Tartessos in the far south of Hispania, the city developed into a large economic and commercial centre as well as being the largest Greek colony in the Iberian Peninsula.

During the Punic Wars, Empúries allied itself with Rome, and Publius Cornelius Scipio initiated the conquest of Hispania from this city in 218 BC by sending his brother Gnaeus Cornelius Scipio Calvus there with Roman troops.

After the conquest of Hispania by the Romans, Empúries remained an independent city-state. However, in the civil war between Pompey and Julius Caesar, it opted for Pompey, and after his defeat, it was stripped of its autonomy. A colonia of Roman veterans, named Emporiae, was established near Indika to control the region.

From that time onwards, Empúries began to decline, obscured by the power of Tarraco (Tarragona) and Barcino (Barcelona). At the end of the 3rd century it became one of the first cities in Spain to admit Christian evangelists. In that century, too, the Greek town was abandoned while the Roman town survived as a mint and the largely ceremonial seat of a coastal county, Castelló d'Empúries, until the Viking raids of the mid-9th century. Coinage began again under count Hugh II of Empúries (1078–1117).

== Archaeological remains ==
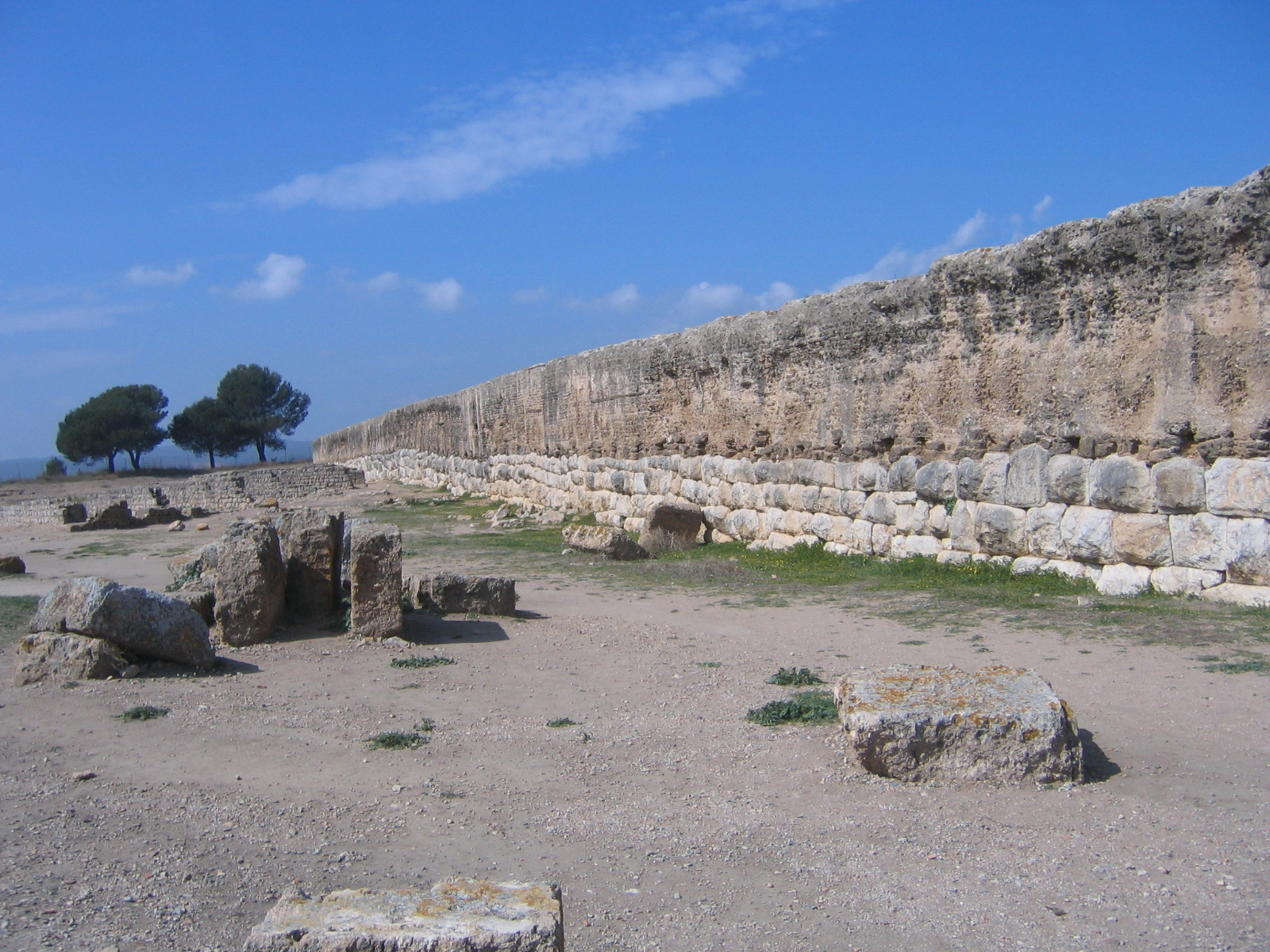
Roman wall at Empúries

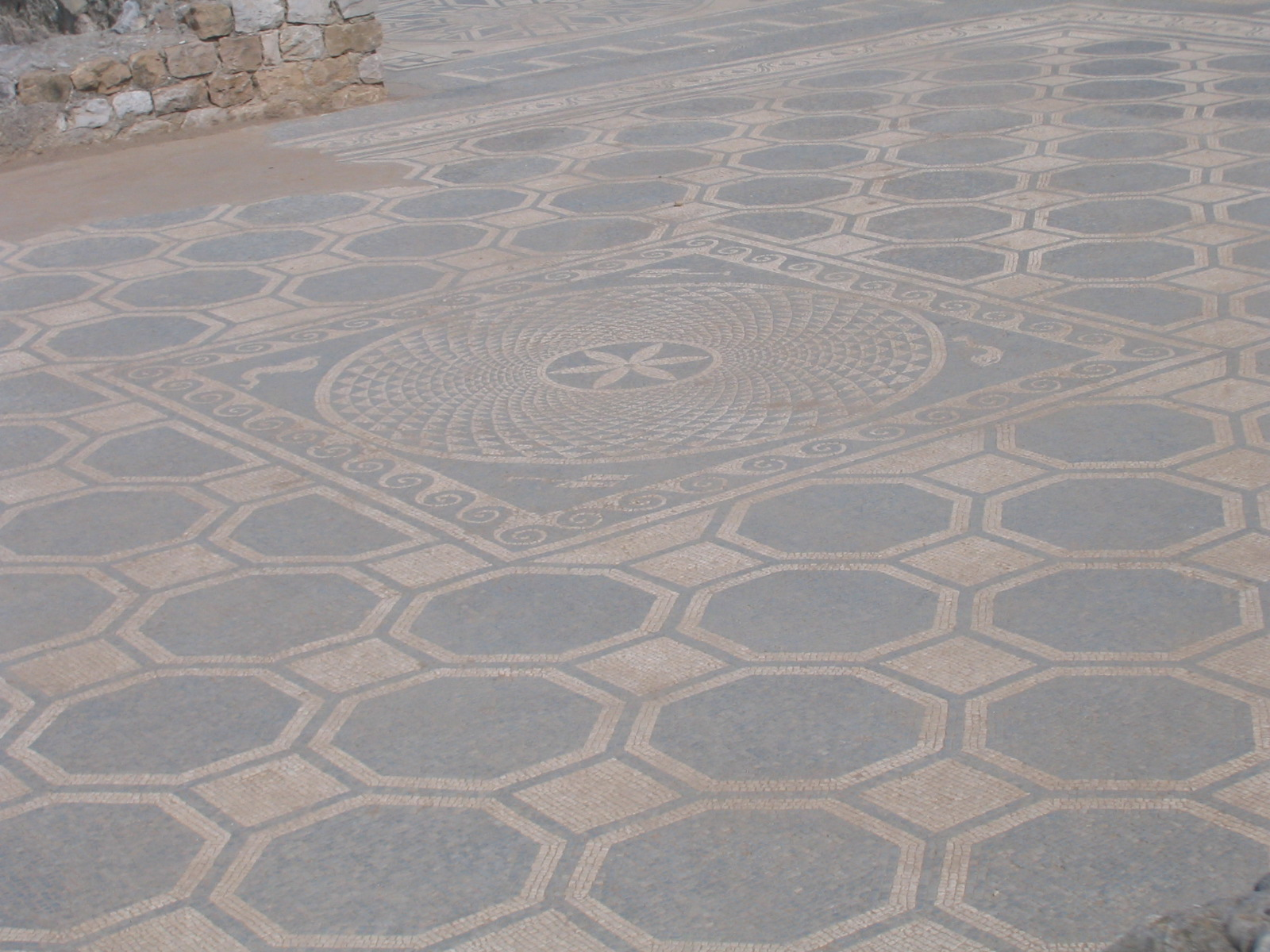
Roman mosaic at Empúries

Although the precise location of the town was known since the 15th century, it was only in the 20th century that systematic excavations were carried out. The site is known as Ampurias. The first official excavations started in 1908 and were held by the Junta de Museus de Barcelona and directed by Emili Gandia i Ortega under the instructions of Josep Puig i Cadafalch and Pere Bosch-Gimpera. These excavations are still going on.

=== Palaiapolis ===
The island on which the Palaiopolis was situated is now part of the mainland and is the site of the medieval village of Sant Martí d'Empúries. The former harbor has silted up as well. Hardly any excavation has been done here.

After the founding of the Neapolis, the old city seems to have functioned as an acropolis (fortress and temple). Strabo mentions a temple dedicated to Artemis at this site.

=== Neapolis ===
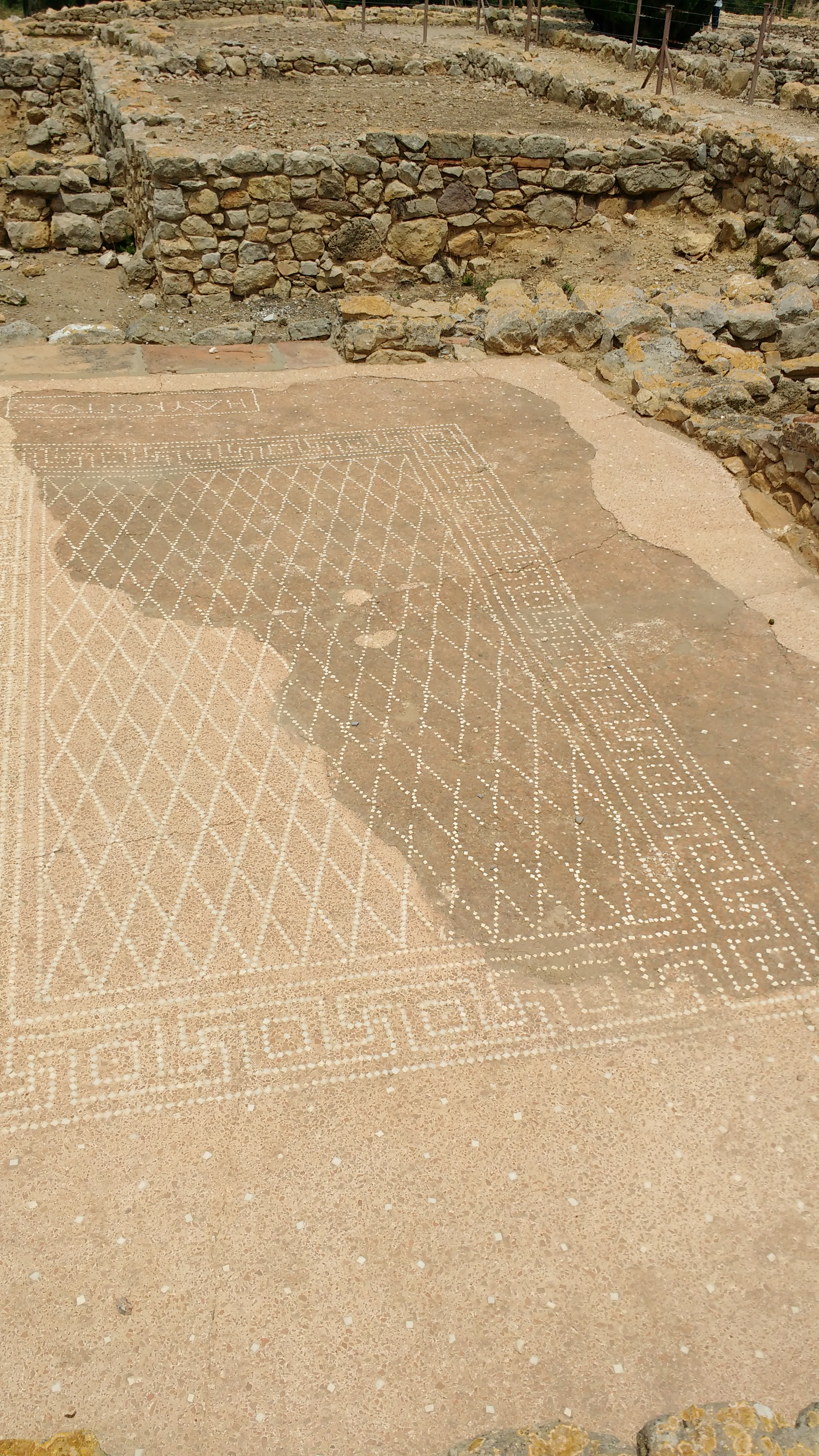
A Greek mosaic in the Neapolis. The Greek word "Ηδύκοιτος" ("the pleasure of lying down") is at the top.

The Neapolis consisted of a walled precinct with an irregular ground plan of 200 m × 130 m (660 ft × 430 ft) The walls were built, and repeatedly modified in the period from the 5th to the 2nd century BC. To the west the wall separated the Neapolis from the Iberian town of Indika.

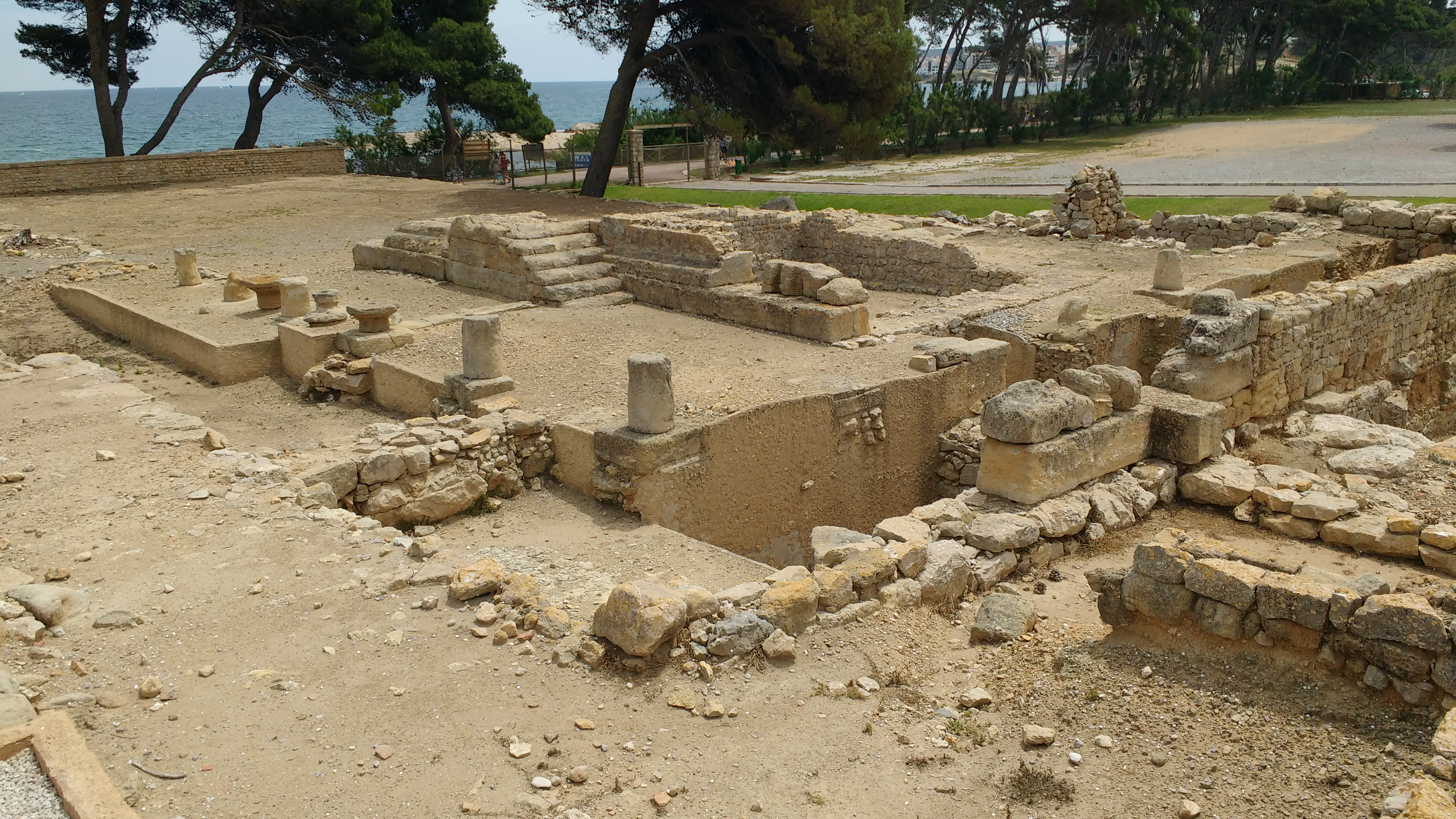
Temple to Serapis at Empúries

In the south-west part of the city were various temples, replacing an older one to Artemis, such as a temple to Asclepius, of whom a marble statue was found. In the south-east part was a temple to Zeus-Serapis. The majority of the excavated buildings belong to the Hellenistic period. In addition to houses, some of which are decorated with mosaics and wallpaintings, a number of public buildings have come to light, such as those in the agora and the harbour mole. In the Roman period, thermae and a Palaeo-Christian basilica were built.

To the south and east of the new city was an area that served as a necropolis.

=== Image gallery ===
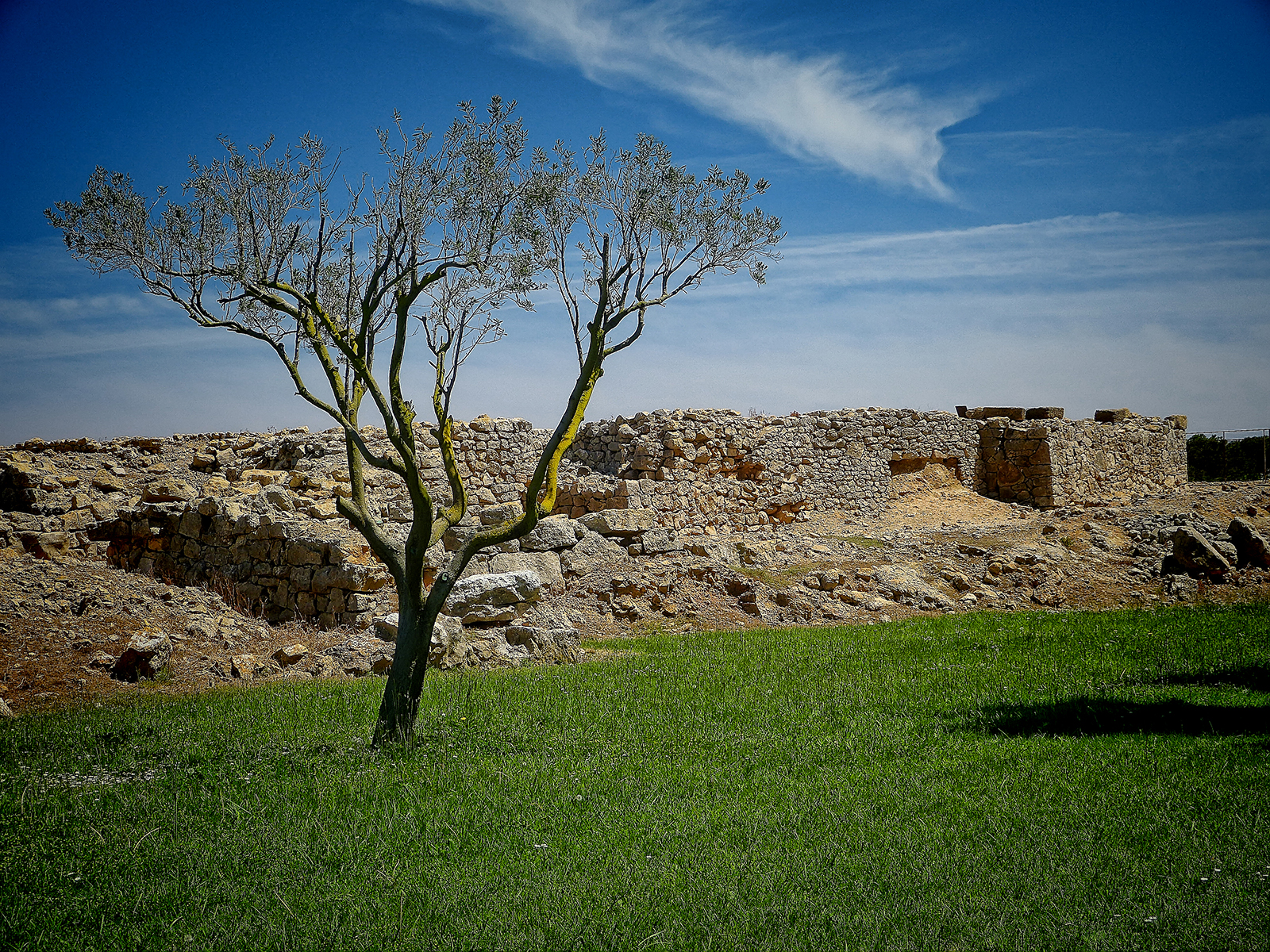
Archaeological remains

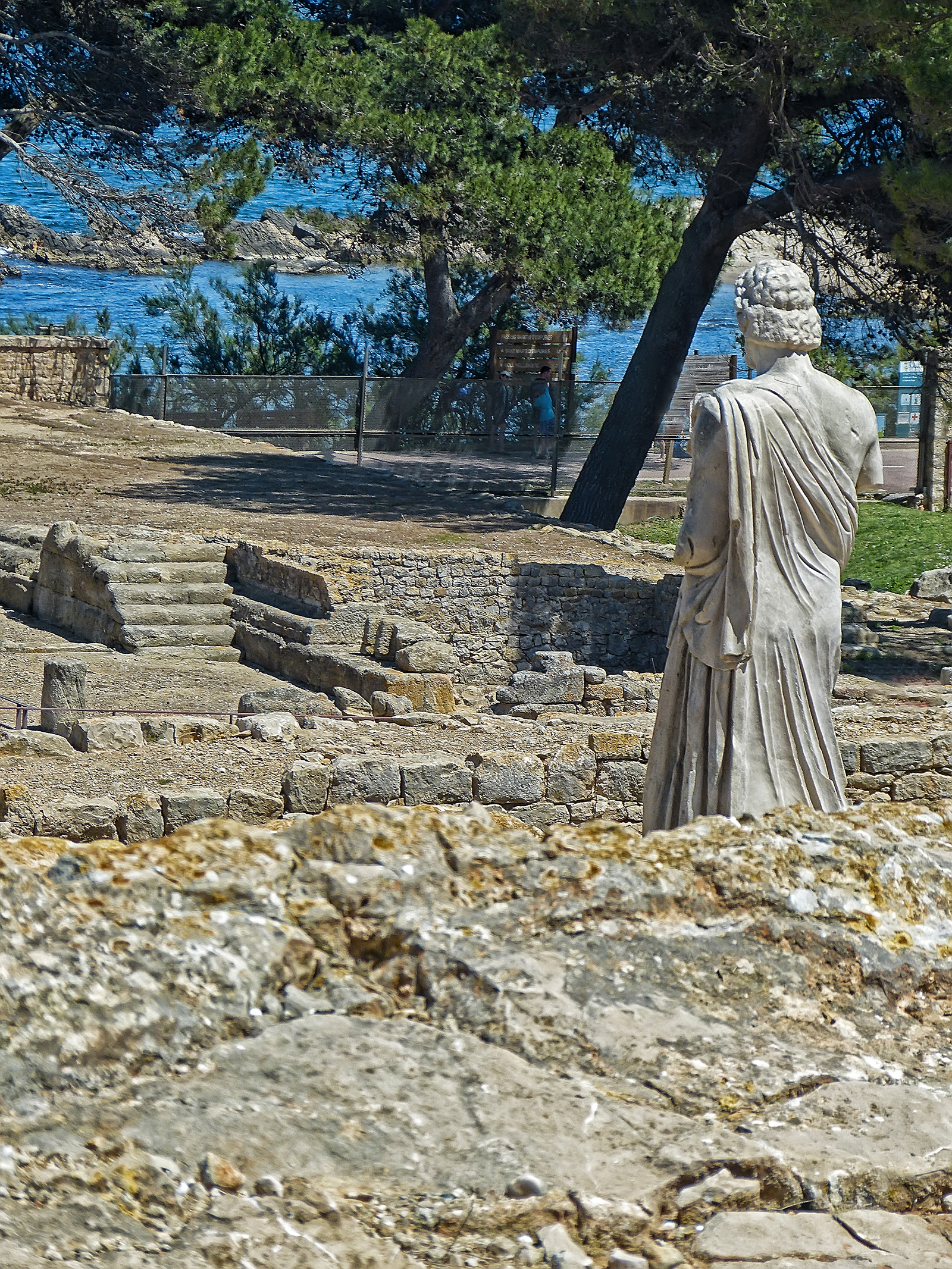
Archaeological Remains with reproduction of Aesclepius

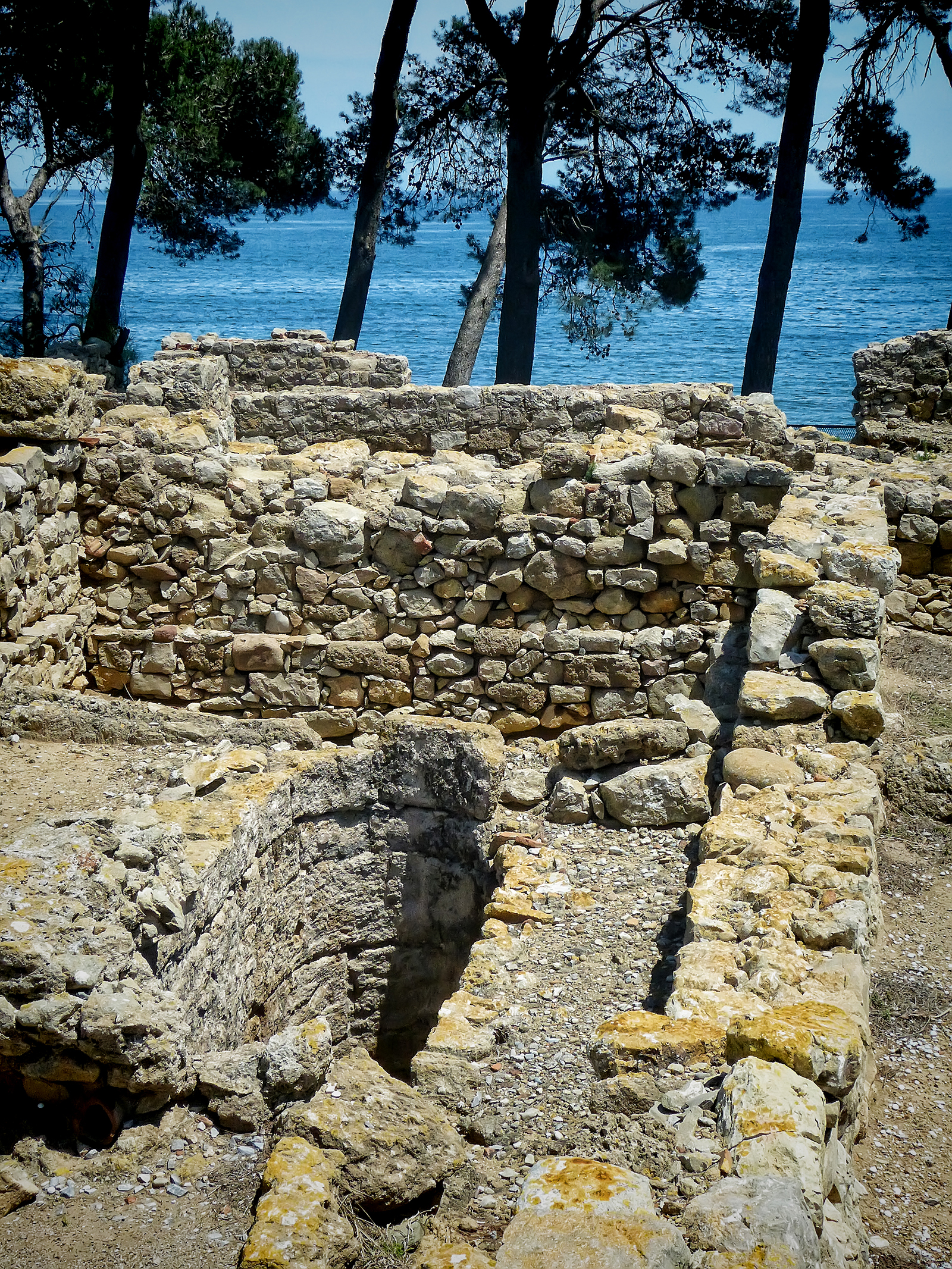
Remains of a cistern

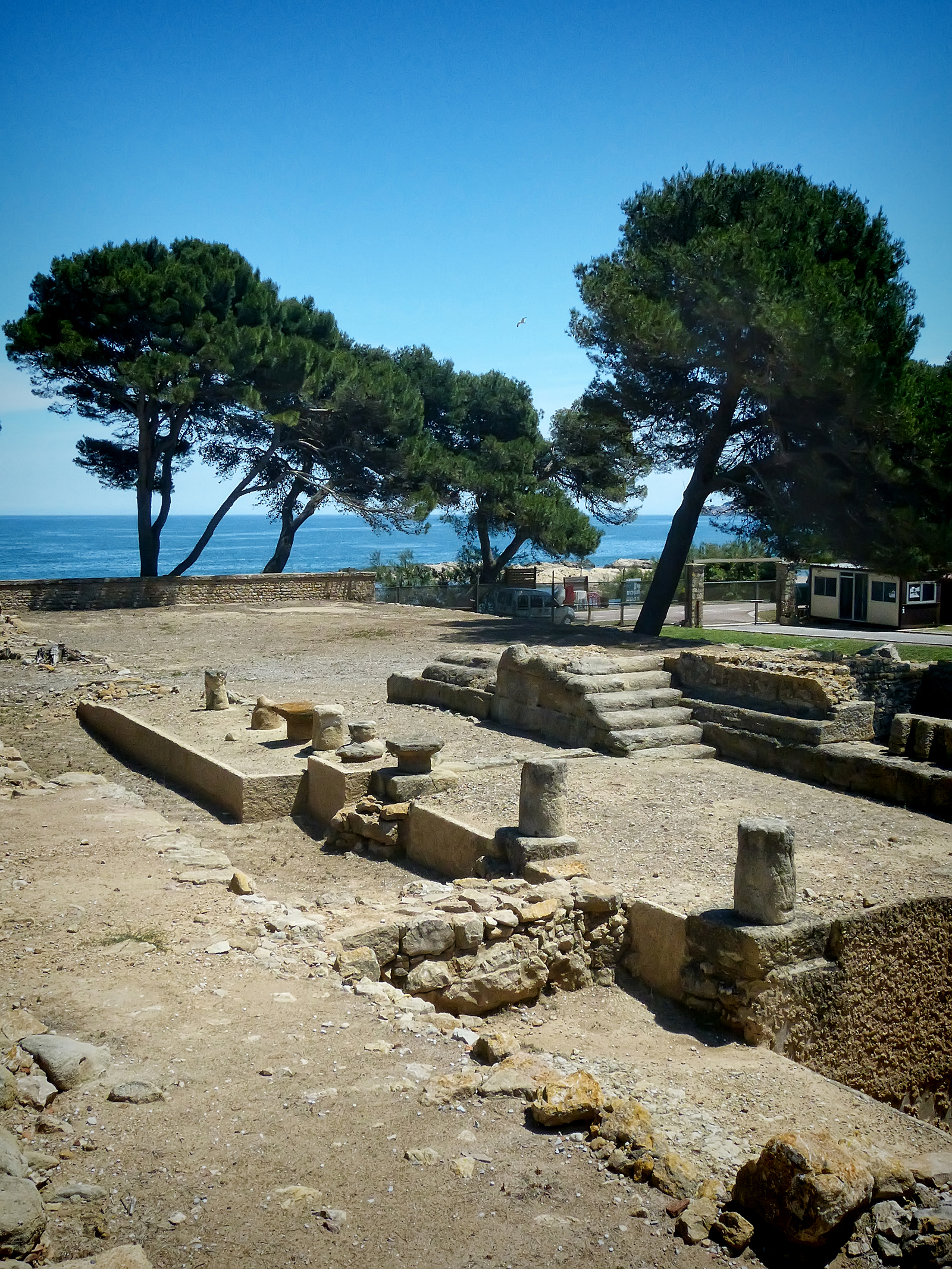
Remains of Greek temple to Serapis

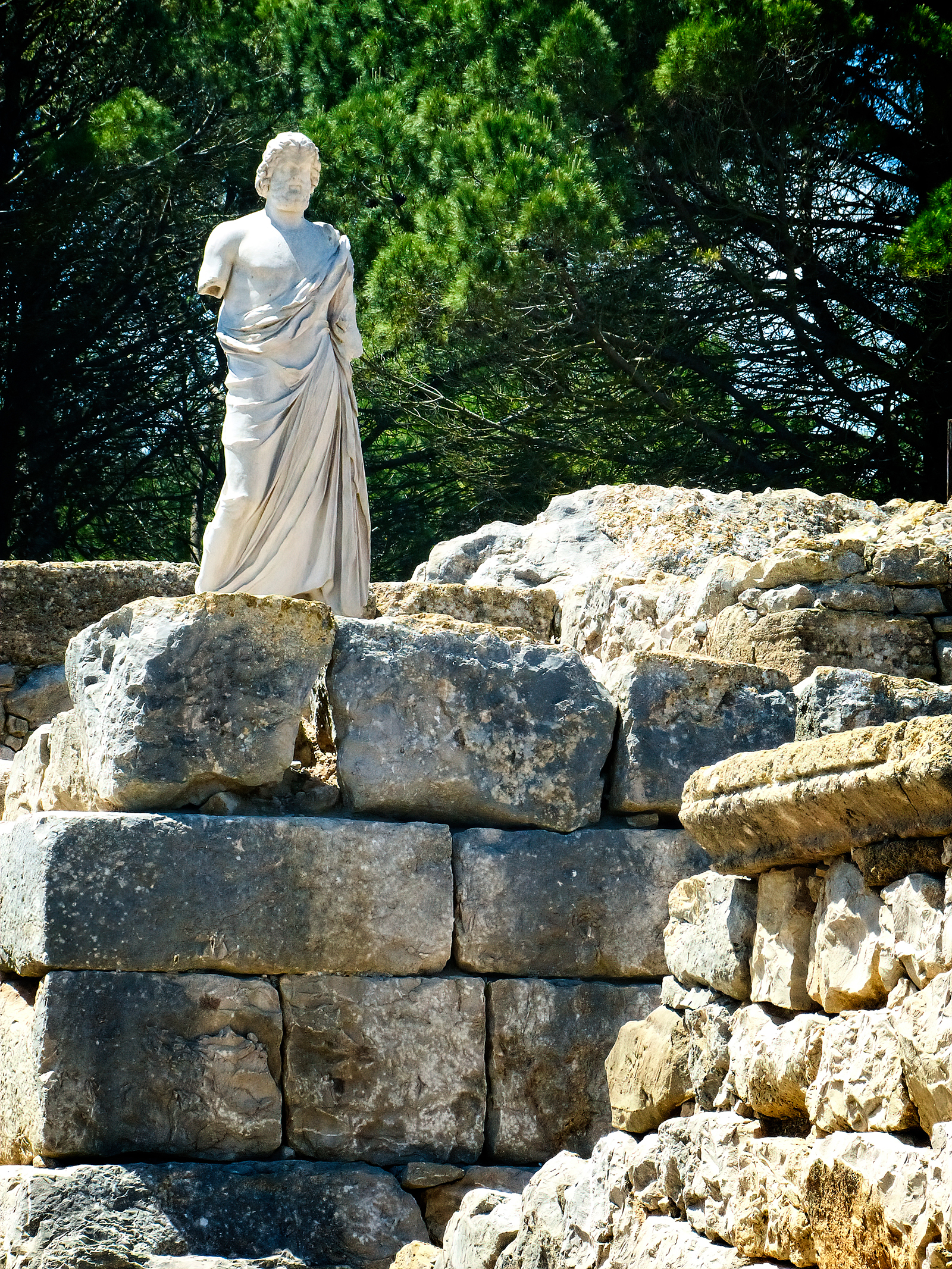
Reproduction of the statue of Aesclepius on the remains of a Greek rampart

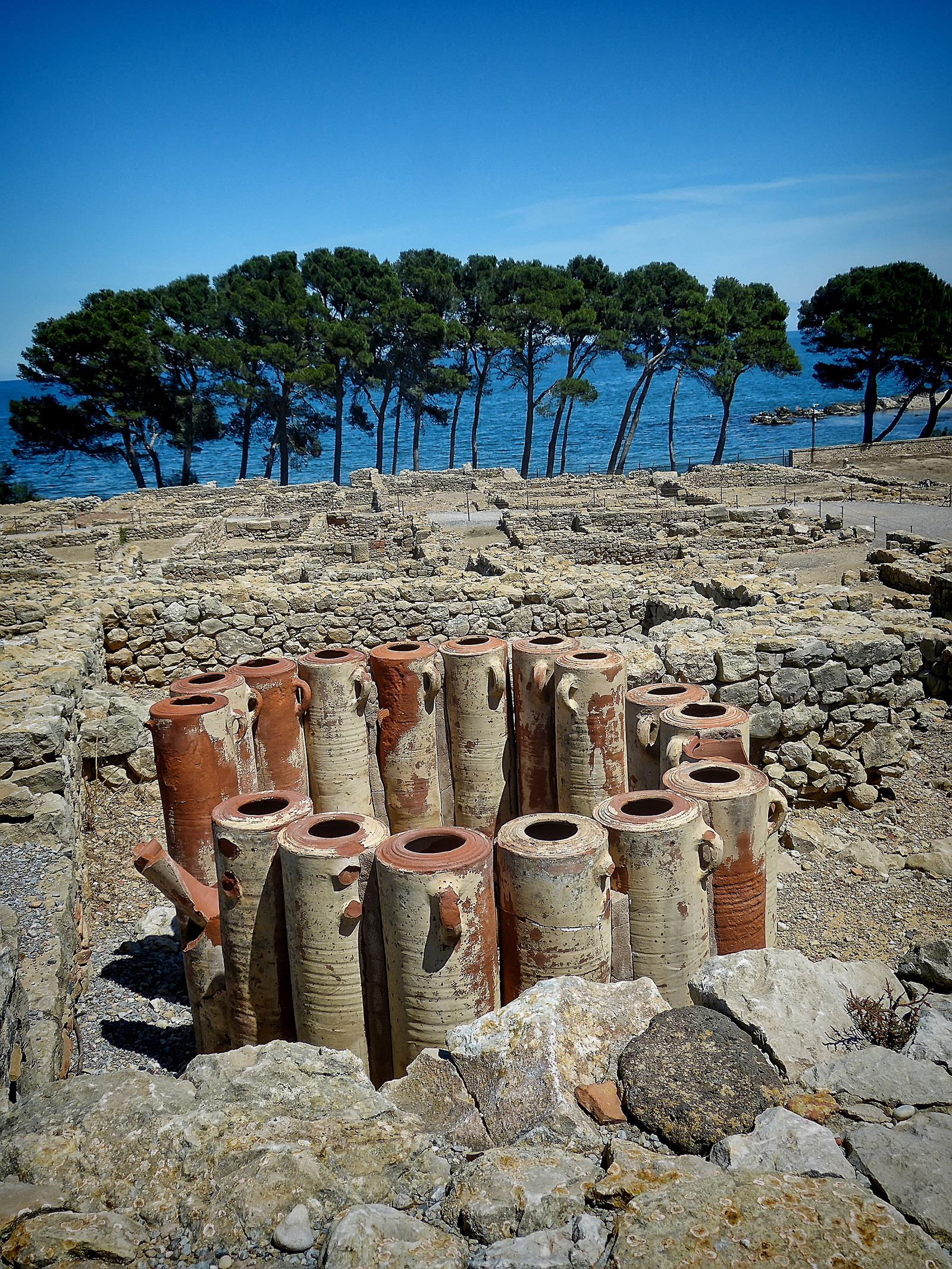
Ancient water filtration pipes

=== Roman city ===
Only about 20% of the Roman city (municipium) has been excavated. The city has the typical orthogonal layout of Roman military camps, with two principal roads meeting at the forum. The Roman city is considerably larger than the Greek one. During the Republican period a temple was built dedicated to the Capitoline Triad: Jupiter, Juno, and Minerva. During the reign of the emperor Augustus a basilica and curia were added, representing the Imperial Cult.

In the eastern part of the town a number of large houses have been excavated, with an inner courtyard, numerous annexes, floor mosaics, and paintings. In the 2nd century the town was surrounded by a wall without towers. An amphitheatre and palaestra were built outside the wall.

== Necropolis ==
The necropolis of Empúries remained in use for a very long period, from the 7th century BC up to the Middle Ages, but many tombs were looted. Martín Almagro Basch wrote two books collecting all data on the majority of cemeteries in the area. There are four types: early Greek and Iberian, late Republican, early Roman Empire and late Roman Empire.

=== Early Greeks and Iberians (6th–3rd century BC) ===
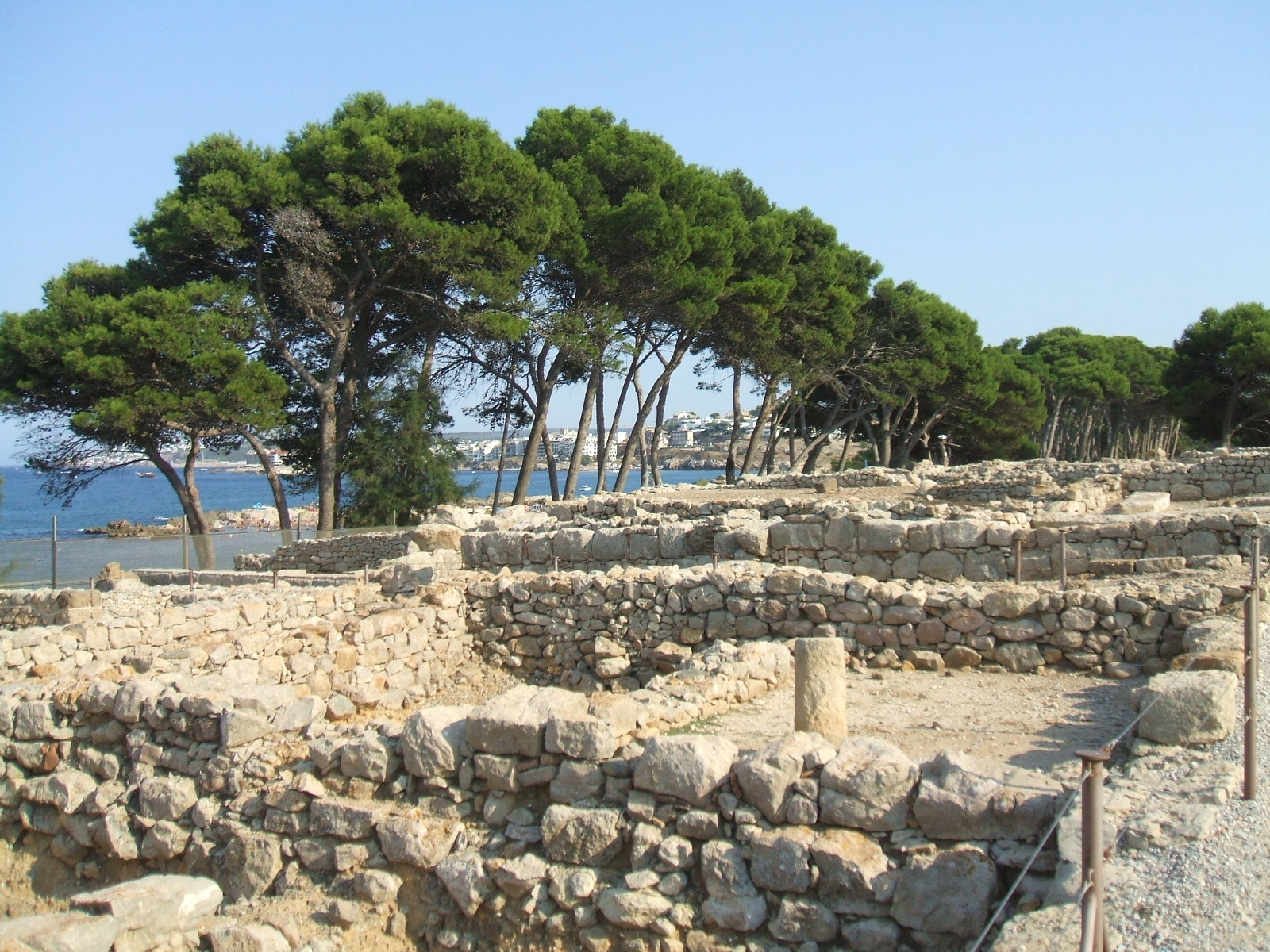
Ruins of a peristyle home from the Greek period of Empúries

Burials were located in the southern and western sides of Neapolis. The western sector was occupied by the so-called necropolis of the wall northeast. Inhumation (Greeks) predominated while a third of burials were cremations (Iberians).

=== Late Republican (2nd–1st century BC) ===
The ancient necropolis remained in use with inhumations and cremations, possibly Greek and indigenous from the Neapolis. Cremations predominated in another group, possibly of Roman origin, whose cemetery is located on the north side of the neighboring hill of Les Corts, located southwest of the city. This necropolis was in use particularly during the 2nd and 1st centuries BC. Archaeologists found small mounds built with square blocks of stone with the remains of cremation in the middle.

=== Early Roman Empire (1st century BC – 2nd century AD) ===
No burials have been found clearly from the second quarter of the 1st century BC until the reign of Augustus (about 35 years). Cremation burials then predominated until the reign of Emperor Flavian (at the end of the 1st century AD) around a hillside where the Roman city is located.

Burial rituals changed in the 2nd century AD, with only inhumations found.

=== Late Roman empire (3rd–6th century) ===
Precise chronologies are hampered by the lack of grave goods in tombs. The whole area of the ancient Greek city was filled with inhumation burials, perhaps related to the worship of the early Christian basilica or Cella Memoria, situated there. Burials are also in many of the ancient necropolis of earlier times (as Bonjoan, in use for a thousand years) and in new ones. It is possible they were related to the Roman villae located near them. There is a monument of El Castellet and nearby tombs.

== The Archaeology Museum of Catalonia ==
The branch of the Archaeology Museum of Catalonia in Empúries (MAC-Empúries) offers visitors an experience in direct contact with the archaeological remains there. A visit to the Greek city and the Roman city are complemented by a tour through the museum, which showcases representative objects from the history of the site that have been uncovered in the years of excavations in Empúries. The museum has parking facilities and the site may be reached by a traffic-free coastal walk from L'Escala.

== See also ==
- List of ancient Greek cities
- List of traditional Greek place names
