= 2010 Men's World Floorball Championships qualifying =

Floorball competition

The 2010 Men's World Floorball Championships Qualifying rounds were the first such qualifiers for world championships in men's floorball. Four separate qualifying tournaments were played, with European qualifications between February 3 and February 6, 2010, in the cities of Babimost and Zbąszyń in Poland, as well as in the city of San Lorenzo de El Escorial in Spain.

The 2010 Men's Asia Pacific Floorball Championships served as the qualifying tournament for countries in the Asian/Oceanian region. The tournament was overseen by the Asia Oceania Floorball Confederation (AOFC), and was played in Woodlands, Singapore. It was played between February 3 to February 7, 2010.

North American qualification matches between Canada and the United States were played in Hamilton, Ontario, Canada from February 5 to February 6, 2010.

These were the first world championships under the IFF's new FIFA-like continental qualification system. A total of 32 countries registered for this event, which is the most nations to ever register for an IFF-sanctioned world championship event. The previous record was 29 for the 2008 Men's World Floorball Championships.

== Qualification process ==
Under the IFF's new qualification system, the 32 countries registered for the world championships needed to qualify for only 16 spots. 8 of these spots were already pre-determined, with the top 7 teams from the 2008 Men's World Floorball Championships A-Division and the top team from the B-Division automatically qualifying. This left just 8 spots for the other 24 registered countries.

Depending on the number of countries registered per continental region, that many slots were given at the world championships.

The countries already qualified are as follows:

Czech Republic	Finland	Germany	Latvia
Norway	Russia	Sweden	Switzerland

=== Asian & Oceanian process ===
Qualifying in the Asia/Oceanian region for the world championships was overseen by the Asia Oceania Floorball Confederation (AOFC).

Only 3 out of 5 registered AOFC countries will qualify. The 5 countries are as follows:

Australia	Singapore
Japan	(South Korea) Korea
Malaysia

=== European process ===
Only 4 out of 16 countries registered in Europe qualified. The 16 countries are as follows:

Austria	Belgium	Denmark	Estonia
France	Georgia	Great Britain	Hungary
Italy	Liechtenstein	Netherlands	Poland
Serbia	Slovakia	Slovenia	Spain

=== North American process ===
Only 1 out of 2 countries registered in North America qualified. The 2 countries are as follows:

Canada	United States

== Groups ==
Ballots for the groups in this event were drawn on May 9, 2009, during one of the semi-final matches of the 2009 Men's under-19 World Floorball Championships in Turku, Finland.

In the way the ballots were drawn, no team qualifying from the AOFC will play against each other in group stage matches, and no team qualifying from Europe will either.

The groups will be assembled based on qualifying as follows:

Group A	Group B	Group C	Group D
Finland	Latvia	Germany	Czech Republic
Russia	Switzerland	Sweden	Norway
North America	AOFC 1	AOFC 3	AOFC 2
West Europe 1	West Europe 2	East Europe 2	East Europe 1

=== Final groups ===
Group A	Group B	Group C	Group D
Finland	Latvia	Germany	Czech Republic
Russia	Switzerland	Sweden	Norway
Canada	AOFC 1	AOFC 3	AOFC 2
Denmark	Poland	Estonia	Italy

== Withdrawals ==
=== India ===
India withdrew from world championships due to financial difficulties on January 21, almost 2 weeks before the tournament began. In turn, the AOFC and IFF were forced to make changes to the schedule to accompany the other teams.

=== Georgia ===
Although Georgia never withdrew from the world championships, they were not able to show up to their first match against Slovakia, resulting in an automatic walkover win of 5:0. This was due to flight problems caused by inclement weather.

== Tiebreaking criteria ==
For the three game group stage of this tournament, where two or more teams in a group tied on an equal number of points, the finishing positions are determined by the record of the tied teams in the games they played against each other in the first instance, then the goals scored and goal difference in all group matches. There is a facility for positions to be determined by a drawing of lots should 2 (or more) team records be identical and their match was a draw against each other.

A win is worth 2 points, a draw is worth 1 point, and a loss is worth 0 points. No sudden victory overtime or penalty shootout will be played in the preliminary round, as matches ending in draws at the end of regulation will award both teams with a single point. Matches which are draws at the end of the playoff round will, however, continue with a sudden victory overtime period and a possible penalty shootout.

== European Qualifying (Poland) ==
2010 Men's World Floorball Championships
European Qualifications (Poland)

Tournament details
- Host country: Poland
- Venues: 2 (in 2 host cities)
- Dates: February 3–6, 2010
- Teams: 8

Final positions
- Champions: Denmark; Poland

Tournament statistics
- Matches played: 16
- Goals scored: 164 (10.25 per match)
- All statistics correct as of 00:16, 7 February 2010 (UTC).

The European Qualifying tournament in Poland determined which 2 teams received a spot in the 2010 World Championships. For this qualifying tournament, the winning teams received a spot in Group A (West Europe 1) or Group B (West Europe 2), depending on their position in preliminary stage play.

Teams in this qualification tournament represented Western Europe, as the IFF used the same criteria they use for EuroFloorball Cup qualifications in order to determine groups.

=== Preliminary round ===
==== Group A ====
All matches in Group A in the preliminary round were played in Zbąszyń, Poland.

Team	Pld	W	D	L	GF	GA	GD	Pts	Qualification
Denmark	3	2	1	0	42	8	+34	5	Advanced to the playoff round
Poland	3	2	1	0	25	5	+20	5	Advanced to the playoff round
Belgium	3	1	0	2	10	29	−19	2	Missed out on the 2010 Men's World Floorball Championships and contested the placement matches
Great Britain	3	0	0	3	4	39	−35	0	Missed out on the 2010 Men's World Floorball Championships and contested the placement matches

===== February 3, 2010 =====
February 3, 2010; 16.00	Great Britain	2:5 ( 1:2, 0:1, 1:2 )	Belgium	Zbąszyń, Poland

Jamie Black – 06.40; Andrew Lovell – 43.38 / Goals / 09.04 – Jonathan Chiau; 15.23 – Michael Jonsson; 25.31 – Olivier Nicolas; 41.11 – Joachim Magnusson; 59.56 – Joachim Magnusson

February 3, 2010; 19.00	Denmark	3:3 ( 1:1, 1:0, 1:2 )	Poland	Zbąszyń, Poland

Kim Jensen – 09.23; Mathias Christoffersen – 28.12; Henrik Engelsen – 43.41 / Goals / 02.39 – Piotr Kostela; 48.04 – Piotr Kostela; 54.04 – Tomasz Gaicki

===== February 4, 2010 =====
February 4, 2010; 16.00	Denmark	22:2 ( 9:2, 6:0, 7:0 )	Great Britain	Zbąszyń, Poland

Jacob Andersen – 02.22; Stefan Hedorf – 04.10; Brian Nielsen – 06.49; Henrik Engelsen – 07.07; Steffen Jensen – 12.18; Anders Kristensen – 12.36; Jesper Petersen – 13.31; Jacob Andersen – 15.27; Steffen Jensen – 16.05; Stefan Hedorf – 24.06; Steffen Jensen – 25.21; Jesper Petersen – 28.19; Mathias Christoffersen – 30.20; Jesper Petersen – 34.05; Anders Kristensen – 36.22; Stefan Hedorf – 41.43; Brian Nielsen – 47.31; Jesper Petersen – 48.34; Stefan Hedorf – 48.57; Stefan Hedorf – 49.33; Stefan Hedorf – 57.17; Mathias Christoffersen – 57.44 / Goals / 01.42 – Jason Brim; 14.39 – Peter Powell

February 4, 2010; 19.00	Poland	10:2 ( 1:2, 5:0, 4:0 )	Belgium	Zbąszyń, Poland

Jan Hajdus – 16.16; Lukasz Adamczak – 26.32; Tomasz Gaicki – 26.44; Tomasz Gaicki – 32.41; Mattias Mikulski – 38.15; Jan Hajdus – 39.57; Jan Hajdus – 47.10; Tomasz Gaicki – 54.02; Lukasz Adamczak – 57.34; Piotr Kostela – 59.55 / Goals / 07.52 – Jonathan Chiau; 17.37 – Joachim Magnusson

===== February 5, 2010 =====
February 5, 2010; 16.00	Belgium	3:17 ( 1:5, 1:6, 1:6 )	Denmark	Zbąszyń, Poland

Jonathan Chiau – 00.22; Thomas Ghilain – 32.26; Michael Jonsson – 41.58 / Goals / 06.08 – Mathias Christoffersen; 10.28 – Brian Nielsen; 12.34 – Mathias Christoffersen; 13.39 – Henrik Engelsen; 16.10 – Niklas Hojholt; 22.29 – Claus Jensen; 24.39 – Mathias Christoffersen; 27.45 – Brian Nielsen; 32.45 – Brian Nielsen; 32.58 – Steffen Jensen; 36.08 – Steffen Jensen; 44.38 – Jesper Petersen; 46.20 – Jesper Petersen; 48.07 – Jesper Petersen; 53.32 – Brian Nielsen; 54.42 – Jesper Petersen; 59.59 – Dannie Pedersen

February 5, 2010; 19.00	Poland	12:0 ( 5:0, 3:0, 4:0 )	Great Britain	Zbąszyń, Poland

Krzysztof Malasiewicz – 07.54; Piotr Kostela – 09.12; Piotr Kostela – 09.29; Tomasz Gaicki – 12.15; Jarosław Lech – 19.01; Lukasz Adamczak – 25.28; Tomasz Gaicki – 28.40; Lukasz Adamczak – 29.25; Krystian Malasiewicz – 45.45; Patryk Hantsch – 47.20; Daniel Girys – 54.43; Tomasz Gaicki – 59.36 / Goals

==== Group B ====
All matches in Group B in the preliminary round were played in Babimost, Poland.

Team	Pld	W	D	L	GF	GA	GD	Pts	Qualification
France	3	2	1	0	17	10	+7	5	Advanced to the playoff round
Hungary	3	2	0	1	11	8	+3	4	Advanced to the playoff round
Austria	3	1	1	1	12	10	+2	3	Missed out on the 2010 Men's World Floorball Championships and contested the placement matches
Serbia	3	0	0	3	7	19	−12	0	Missed out on the 2010 Men's World Floorball Championships and contested the placement matches

===== February 3, 2010 =====
February 3, 2010; 16.00	Hungary	2:3 ( 2:0, 0:2, 0:1 )	France	Babimost, Poland

Norbert Duró – 00.29; Philip Kapetz – 04.54 / Goals / 38.29 – Beat Glauser; 39.17 – Simon Riihelä; 44.06 – Jérome Andermatt

February 3, 2010; 19.00	Austria	5:1 ( 1:0, 2:1, 2:0 )	Serbia	Babimost, Poland

Timo Schmid – 10.42; Stefan Simonsen – 31.47; Mathias Rohm – 38.47; Mathias Rohm – 43.09; Felix Moosburger – 51.04 / Goals / 39.08 – Ivan Marceta

===== February 4, 2010 =====
February 4, 2010; 16.00	Austria	1:3 ( 0:1, 0:2, 1:0 )	Hungary	Babimost, Poland

Benjamin Gruber – 57.14 / Goals / 17.48 – Christian Kapetz; 27.17 – Csaba Pazsák; 29.17 – Máté Darai

February 4, 2010; 19.00	Serbia	2:8 ( 1:1, 0:4, 1:3 )	France	Babimost, Poland

Alexander Milovanovic – 12.31; Marko Petrovic – 42.39 / Goals / 03.54 – Alexandre Simonian; 24.23 – Simon Riihelä; 27.34 – Michel Neumuller; 31.41 – Simon Riihelä; 34.44 – Claudio Henry; 47.33 – Laurent Herzog; 48.38 – Simon Riihelä; 54.33 – Samuel Antoine

===== February 5, 2010 =====
February 5, 2010; 16.00	Serbia	4:6 ( 2:3, 1:1, 1:2 )	Hungary	Babimost, Poland

Toni Valle – 11.06; Alexander Milovanovic – 11.58; Marko Stozinic – 24.13; Alexander Milovanovic – 42.55 / Goals / 04.41 – Norbert Duró; 08.58 – Altamash Mujahid; 18.46 – Dennis Schmidt; 33.29 – Oliver Schmidt; 48.48 – Oliver Schmidt; 53.17 – Bence Farsang

February 5, 2010; 19.00	France	6:6 ( 0:1, 3:2, 3:3 )	Austria	Babimost, Poland

Samuel Antoine – 22.44; Michel Neumuller – 33.11; Simon Riihelä – 39.14; Beat Glauser – 44.36; Jérome Andermatt – 50.27; Raphaël Schubenel – 56.13 / Goals / 03.58 – Helmut Koloini; 31.20 – Siegfried Sendlhofer; 36.40 – Helmut Koloini; 47.41 – Benjamin Gruber; 53.30 – Benjamin Gruber; 54.44 – Joël Bale

=== Playoff round ===
At this stage in the tournament, there was no playoff bracket. Instead, the first placed team from group A faced the second placed team from group B, and vice versa. The winners of these two matches qualified for the 2010 World Championships. These matches were played in Babimost, Poland.

==== West Europe 1 final ====
February 6, 2010; 11.00	Denmark	9:2 ( 4:1, 2:1, 3:0 )	Hungary	Babimost, Poland

Jesper Petersen – 06.38; Mathias Christoffersen – 09.06; Stefan Hedorf – 09.37; Steffen Jensen – 16.55; Mathias Christoffersen – 28.47; Bo Jensen – 29.30; Claus Jensen – 48.20; Claus Jensen – 54.18; Jacob Andersen – 56.17 / Goals / 12.41 – Dennis Schmidt; 21.51 – Philip Kapetz

==== West Europe 2 final ====
February 6, 2010; 14.00	France	2:4 ( 1:0, 1:2, 0:2 )	Poland	Babimost, Poland

Samuel Antoine – 01.48; Simon Riihelä – 34.53 / Goals / 33.01 – Piotr Kostela; 39.03 – Jan Hajdus; 40.28 – Tomasz Gaicki; 51.27 – Piotr Kostela

=== Placement matches ===
At this stage in the competition, third-placed teams from both groups played against each other, as well as the fourth placed teams, to determine world rankings as they did not qualify for the world championships. These matches were played in Zbąszyń, Poland.

==== Seventh-place match ====
February 6, 2010; 10.00	Serbia	5:4 ( 2:0, 0:2, 3:2 )	Great Britain	Zbąszyń, Poland

Alexander Milovanovic – 01.22; Alexander Milovanovic – 13.58; Alexander Milovanovic – 48.40; Alexander Milovanovic – 59.37; Toni Valle – 59.59 / Goals / 23.31 – Simon Baker; 26.19 – Jamie Black; 42.36 – James Bridger; 45.13 – Thomas Cook

==== Fifth-place match ====
February 6, 2010; 13.00	Belgium	4:6 ( 2:2, 2:2, 0:2 )	Austria	Zbąszyń, Poland

Joachim Magnusson – 08.54; Thomas Ghilain – 17.43; Thomas Ghilain – 29.54; Jonathan Chiau – 32.55 / Goals / 07.02 – Thomas Simonsen; 18.52 – Helmut Koloini; 29.21 – Joël Bale; 30.01 – Joël Bale; 40.21 – Joe Leurer; 58.39 – Joe Leurer

== European Qualifying (Spain) ==
2010 Men's World Floorball Championships
European Qualifications (Spain)

Tournament details
- Host country: Spain
- Venue: 1 (in 1 host city)
- Dates: February 3 to February 6, 2010
- Teams: 8

Tournament statistics
- Matches played: 16
- Goals scored: 0 (0 per match)
- All statistics correct as of 22:18, July 28, 2009 (UTC).

The European Qualifying tournament in Spain determined which 2 teams received a spot in the 2010 World Championships. For this qualifying tournament, the winning teams received a spot in Group C (East Europe 1) or Group D (East Europe 2), depending on their position in preliminary stage play.

Teams in this qualification tournament represented Eastern Europe, as the IFF used the same criteria they use for EuroFloorball Cup qualifications in order to determine groups.

All matches in the preliminary round, playoffs, and placement rounds were played in San Lorenzo de El Escorial, Spain.

=== Preliminary round ===
==== Group C ====
Team	Pld	W	D	L	GF	GA	GD	Pts	Qualification
Italy	3	2	1	0	30	5	+25	5	Advanced to the playoff round
Slovakia	3	2	1	0	24	3	+21	5	Advanced to the playoff round
Netherlands	3	1	0	2	11	24	−13	2	Missed out on the 2010 Men's World Floorball Championships and contested the placement matches
Georgia	3	0	0	3	1	34	−33	0	Missed out on the 2010 Men's World Floorball Championships and contested the placement matches

===== February 3, 2010 =====
February 3, 2010; 11.00	Italy	7:2 ( 3:0, 3:1, 1:1 )	Netherlands	San Lorenzo de El Escorial, Spain

February 3, 2010; 16.30	Slovakia	5:0 (W.O.) ( 0:0, 0:0, 0:0 )	Georgia	San Lorenzo de El Escorial, Spain

*Note: Slovakia was awarded a 5:0 walkover win over Georgia.

===== February 4, 2010 =====
February 4, 2010; 11.00	Netherlands	9:1 ( 4:1, 5:0, 0:0 )	Georgia	San Lorenzo de El Escorial, Spain

February 4, 2010; 16.30	Italy	3:3 ( 2:1, 1:1, 0:1 )	Slovakia	San Lorenzo de El Escorial, Spain

===== February 5, 2010 =====
February 5, 2010; 11.00	Georgia	0:20 ( 0:3, 0:10, 0:7 )	Italy	San Lorenzo de El Escorial, Spain

February 5, 2010; 16.30	Netherlands	0:16 ( 0:4, 0:3, 0:9 )	Slovakia	San Lorenzo de El Escorial, Spain

==== Group D ====
Team	Pld	W	D	L	GF	GA	GD	Pts	Qualification
Estonia	3	3	0	0	33	0	+33	6	Advanced to the playoff round
Spain	3	2	0	1	7	12	−5	4	Advanced to the playoff round
Slovenia	3	1	0	2	8	14	−6	2	Missed out on the 2010 Men's World Floorball Championships and contested the placement matches
Liechtenstein	3	0	0	3	0	22	−22	0	Missed out on the 2010 Men's World Floorball Championships and contested the placement matches

===== February 3, 2010 =====
February 3, 2010; 13.45	Estonia	13:0 ( 1:0, 8:0, 4:0 )	Liechtenstein	San Lorenzo de El Escorial, Spain

February 3, 2010; 19.30	Slovenia	2:4 ( 1:2, 0:1, 1:1 )	Spain	San Lorenzo de El Escorial, Spain

===== February 4, 2010 =====
February 4, 2010; 13.45	Estonia	10:0 ( 4:0, 3:0, 3:0 )	Slovenia	San Lorenzo de El Escorial, Spain

February 4, 2010; 19.15	Liechtenstein	0:3 ( 0:1, 0:2, 0:0 )	Spain	San Lorenzo de El Escorial, Spain

===== February 5, 2010 =====
February 5, 2010; 13.45	Liechtenstein	0:6 ( 0:3, 0:3, 0:0 )	Slovenia	San Lorenzo de El Escorial, Spain

February 5, 2010; 19.15	Spain	0:10 ( 0:3, 0:2, 0:5 )	Estonia	San Lorenzo de El Escorial, Spain

=== Playoff round ===
At this stage in the tournament, there was no playoff bracket. Instead, the first placed team from group C faced the second placed team from group D, and vice versa. The winners of these two matches qualified for the 2010 World Championships.

==== East Europe 1 Final ====
February 6, 2010; 19.00	Italy	4:2 ( 1:1, 0:0, 3:1 )	Spain	San Lorenzo de El Escorial, Spain

==== East Europe 2 Final ====
February 6, 2010; 16.00	Estonia	8:4 ( 1:0, 2:1, 5:3 )	Slovakia	San Lorenzo de El Escorial, Spain

=== Placement matches ===
At this stage in the competition, third-placed teams from both groups played against each other, as well as the fourth placed teams, to determine world rankings as they did not qualify for the world championships.

==== Seventh-place match ====
February 6, 2010; 10.00	Liechtenstein	5:1 ( 0:0, 2:1, 3:0 )	Georgia	San Lorenzo de El Escorial, Spain

==== Fifth-place match ====
February 6, 2010; 13.00	Netherlands	2:3 ( 1:0, 1:1, 0:2 )	Slovenia	San Lorenzo de El Escorial, Spain

== Asian/Oceanian qualifying ==
2010 Men's World Floorball Championships
Asian/Oceanian Qualifying

Tournament details
- Host country: Singapore
- Venue: 1 (in 1 host city)
- Dates: February 3 to February 7, 2010
- Teams: 5

Tournament statistics
- Matches played: 10
- Goals scored: 68 (6.8 per match)
- Scoring leader(s): TBD

Awards
- TBA
- All statistics correct as of 07:52, 6 February 2010 (UTC).

The Asian/Oceanian Qualifying tournament in Singapore determined which 3 teams received a spot in the 2010 World Championships. For this qualifying tournament, a winning team received a spot in Group B (AOFC 1), Group C (AOFC 3), or Group D (AOFC 2), depending on their position in preliminary stage play.

Teams in this qualification tournament represented the Asia Oceania Floorball Confederation (AOFC). This tournament was also known as the 2010 Men's Asia Pacific Floorball Championships.

There was only a preliminary round in this tournament, and the top 3 teams at the end of the round qualified for the 2010 World Championships. No placement matches were played.

Originally scheduled to play in the tournament, India withdrew due to financial difficulties.

All matches were played in Woodlands, Singapore.

=== Group E ===
Team	Pld	W	D	L	GF	GA	GD	Pts	Qualification
Singapore	4	3	1	0	45	9	+36	7	Qualified for the 2010 Men's World Floorball Championships
Japan	4	3	1	0	25	9	+16	7	Qualified for the 2010 Men's World Floorball Championships
Australia	4	1	1	2	19	17	+2	3	Qualified for the 2010 Men's World Floorball Championships
(South Korea) Korea	4	1	1	2	19	21	−2	3	Missed out on the 2010 Men's World Floorball Championships
Malaysia	4	0	0	4	4	56	−52	0	Missed out on the 2010 Men's World Floorball Championships

==== February 3, 2010 ====
February 3, 2010; 16.00	Japan	6:2 ( 2:0, 3:1, 1:1 )	Australia	Woodlands, Singapore

February 3, 2010; 19.00	(South Korea) Korea	2:10 ( 1:3, 0:4, 1:3 )	Singapore	Woodlands, Singapore

==== February 4, 2010 ====
February 4, 2010; 16.00	Singapore	25:1 ( 11:0, 4:0, 10:1 )	Malaysia	Woodlands, Singapore

February 4, 2010; 19.00	Australia	3:3 ( 2:0, 0:0, 1:3 )	(South Korea) Korea	Woodlands, Singapore

==== February 5, 2010 ====
February 5, 2010; 13.00	Japan	11:1 ( 3:0, 6:0, 2:1 )	Malaysia	Woodlands, Singapore

February 5, 2010; 19.00	Australia	4:8 ( 1:0, 2:3, 1:5 )	Singapore	Woodlands, Singapore

==== February 6, 2010 ====
February 6, 2010; 15.00	Malaysia	2:10 ( 0:2, 1:2, 1:6 )	(South Korea) Korea	Woodlands, Singapore

February 6, 2010; 18.00	Singapore	2:2 ( 1:1, 1:0, 0:1 )	Japan	Woodlands, Singapore

==== February 7, 2010 ====
February 7, 2010; 10.00	Japan	6:4 ( 1:0, 1:4, 4:0 )	(South Korea) Korea	Woodlands, Singapore

February 7, 2010; 16.00	Australia	10:0 ( 2:0, 3:0, 5:0 )	Malaysia	Woodlands, Singapore

== North American qualifying ==
2010 Men's World Floorball Championships
North American Qualifying

Tournament details
- Host country: Canada
- Venue: 1 (in 1 host city)
- Dates: February 5 to February 6, 2010
- Teams: 2

Final positions
- Champions: Canada

Tournament statistics
- Matches played: 2
- Goals scored: 27 (13.5 per match)
- All statistics correct as of 00:32, 7 February 2010 (UTC).

The North American Qualifying rounds of the 2010 World Championships took place in Hamilton, Ontario, Canada, from February 5 to February 6, 2010. 2 matches were played, and the winner advanced to the 2010 World Championships based on aggregate scoring.

Although the tournament is for North American qualifying, it was previously set up by the IFF for qualifying for the Americas, which would have included both North and South America.

=== Criticism ===
Only two teams out of four eligible teams registered for this event, those being Canada and the United States. The other two eligible teams were Argentina and Brazil. Brazil is the only team in the Americas which has yet to take part in an IFF-sanctioned world championship event, as Argentina was given a wild card to take part in the C-Division of the 2008 Men's World Floorball Championships.

Out of these two teams, only one would qualify and receive the North America slot in Group A at the 2010 World Championships. This format has drawn a lot of criticism from floorball media, as both Canada and the United States have consistently finished at the top of their respective divisions at previous world championships, but were unable to advance due to the IFF's poorly structured division advancement/relegation format.

However, even if all four eligible teams registered, only one slot at the world championships would have been given, which drew criticism as Asian/Oceanian qualifications give three slots at the world championships to six out of ten eligible teams.

It is believed that the IFF may change their continental qualification format for the 2012 Men's World Floorball Championships.

=== Group F ===
Team	Pld	W	D	L	GF	GA	GD	Pts
Canada	2	2	0	0	17	10	+7	4
United States	2	0	0	2	10	17	−7	0

*Note: Standings table is provided only for statistical comparison, as qualifying in this group was based on aggregate scoring rather than ranking.

==== February 5, 2010 ====
February 5, 2010; 11.30	United States	(6) 6:11 (11) ( 4:3, 2:4, 0:4 )	Canada	Hamilton, Ontario, Canada

Michael Binder – 04.44; Karl Förare – 07.04; Stefan Zimmermann – 10.15; Stefan Zimmermann – 18.06; Michael Binder – 20.25; Ryan Winkler – 32.15 / Goals / 07.34 – Patrick Ducharme; 07.57 – Risto Parikka; 14.59 – Dominic Morency; 20.52 – Jean Sebastien Plante; 27.21 – Paavo Parikka; 33.01 – Risto Parikka; 37.13 – Paavo Parikka; 44.56 – Simon Leblanc; 46.25 – Dominic Morency; 49.16 – Philip Schuler; 54.10 – Philip Schuler

==== February 6, 2010 ====
February 6, 2010; 13.00	Canada	(17) 6:4 (10) ( 2:0, 2:3, 2:1 )	United States	Hamilton, Ontario, Canada

Risto Parikka – 07.12; Patrice Pare – 19.28; Patrick Ducharme – 30.14; Lauri Hannelius – 31.16; Risto Parikka – 49.30; Jean Sebastien Plante – 52.02 / Goals / 26.20 – Michael Binder; 28.05 – Karl Förare; 34.36 – Karl Förare; 50.50 – Karl Förare

== See also ==
- 2010 Men's Asia Pacific Floorball Championships
- 2010 Men's World Floorball Championships

== Citations ==
Men's World Floorball Championships; Continental Qualifying – Host Cities
Preceded by None; 2008	Asia/Oceania; Woodlands, Singapore; 2010	Succeeded by TBA; 2012
Preceded by None; 2008	East Europe; San Lorenzo de El Escorial, Spain; 2010	Succeeded by TBA; 2012
Preceded by None; 2008	North/South America; Hamilton, Ontario, Canada; 2010	Succeeded by TBA; 2012
Preceded by None; 2008	West Europe; Babimost, Poland; 2010	Succeeded by TBA; 2012
