= 2010 Men's World Floorball Championships =

Floorball competition

Tournament details
- Host country: Finland
- Venues: 2 (in 2 host cities)
- Dates: 4–11 December 2010
- Teams: 16

Final positions
- Champions: Finland (2nd title)
- Runners-up: Sweden
- Third place: Czech Republic
- Fourth place: Switzerland

Tournament statistics
- Matches played: 43
- Goals scored: 616 (14.33 per match)
- Scoring leader(s): (Switzerland) Matthias Hofbauer

Awards
- MVP: (Finland) Mika Kohonen

The 2010 Men's World Floorball Championships were the eighth men's Floorball World Championships. The tournament was held from 4 December to 11 December 2010 in the cities of Helsinki, and Vantaa, Finland.

This was the first world championships under the International Floorball Federation's (IFF) FIFA-like continental qualification system. A total of 32 countries had registered for this event, which is the most nations to ever register for an IFF-sanctioned world championship event. The previous record was 29 for the 2008 Men's World Floorball Championships.

== Qualifying ==
Under the IFF's new qualification system, the 32 countries registered for the world championships had to qualify for only 16 spots. 8 of these spots had already been pre-determined, with the top 7 teams from the 2008 Men's World Floorball Championships A-Division and the top team from the B-Division automatically qualifying. This left just 8 spots for the other 24 registered countries.

The countries already qualified are as follows:

| Czech Republic | Finland |
| Germany | Latvia |
| Norway | Russia |
| Sweden | Switzerland |

=== Asia/Oceania ===
Qualifying in the Asia/Oceanian region for the world championships will be overseen by the Asia Oceania Floorball Confederation (AOFC).

Only 3 out of 5 registered AOFC countries qualified. The 5 countries were as follows:

| Australia | Singapore |
| Japan | (South Korea) Korea |
Malaysia

Note: India withdrew from world championships due to financial difficulties

=== Europe ===
Only 4 out of 16 countries registered in Europe qualified. The 16 countries were as follows:

| Austria | Belgium | Denmark | Estonia |
| France | Georgia | Great Britain | Hungary |
| Italy | Liechtenstein | Netherlands | Poland |
| Serbia | Slovakia | Slovenia | Spain |

=== North America ===
Only 1 out of 2 countries registered in North America qualified. The 2 countries were as follows:

| Canada | United States |

== Groups ==
Ballots for the groups in this event were drawn on May 9, 2009, during one of the semi-final matches of the 2009 Men's under-19 World Floorball Championships in Turku, Finland.

In the way the ballots were drawn, no team qualified from the AOFC played against each other in group stage matches, and no team qualified from Europe either.

The groups were assembled based on qualifying as follows:

| Group A | Group B | Group C | Group D |
|---|---|---|---|
| Finland | Latvia | Germany | Czech Republic |
| Russia | Switzerland | Sweden | Norway |
| Europe 1 | AOFC 1 | AOFC 3 | AOFC 2 |
| North America | Europe 2 | Europe 4 | Europe 3 |

=== Final groups ===
| Group A | Group B | Group C | Group D |
|---|---|---|---|
| Finland | Latvia | Germany | Czech Republic |
| Russia | Switzerland | Sweden | Norway |
| Denmark | Singapore | Australia | Japan |
| Canada | Poland | Estonia | Italy |

== Championship schedule ==
=== Preliminary round ===
==== Group A ====
| Team | Pld | W | D | L | GF | GA | GD | Pts |
|---|---|---|---|---|---|---|---|---|
| Finland | 3 | 3 | 0 | 0 | 36 | 5 | +31 | 6 |
| Russia | 3 | 2 | 0 | 1 | 17 | 23 | −6 | 4 |
| Canada | 3 | 1 | 0 | 2 | 14 | 27 | −13 | 2 |
| Denmark | 3 | 0 | 0 | 3 | 8 | 20 | −12 | 0 |

December 4, 2010

| Canada | 6–9 | Russia |
|---|---|---|
| 1–4 Michael Grönlund – 20:08; 2–6 Michael Grönlund – 36:00; 3–7 Paavo Parikka – 38:46; 4–7 Stéphane Laporte – 41:18; 5–8 Risto Parikka – 44:49; 6–8 Patrice Pare – 53:53 | | 0–1 Pavel Semenov – 0:46; 0–2 Anatoly Bykov – 1:59; 0–3 Sergey Yuryev – 3:59; 0–4 Artem Olin – 11:10; 1–5 Pavel Semenov – 23:40; 1–6 Valery Maslov – 32:09; 2–7 Alexander Tyapkov – 37:20; 4–8 Artem Olin – 44:19; 6–9 Yuriy Osin – 59:45 |

Hartwall Areena, Helsinki

| Finland | 8–1 | Denmark |

Energia Areena, Vantaa

December 5, 2010

| Finland | 14–2 | Canada |

Hartwall Areena, Helsinki

| Denmark | 3–6 | Russia |

Energia Areena, Vantaa

December 7, 2010

| Canada | 6–4 | Denmark |
|---|---|---|
| 1–0 Paavo Parikka – 08:41; 2–0 Lauri Hannelius – 12:32; 3–1 Eric Ulli-Vanasse – 17:34; 4–1 Mathieu Ferron – 32:04; 5–2 Michael Grönlund – 34:28; 6–2 Risto Parikka – 39:00 | | 2–1 Alex Jensen – 17:18; 4–2 Niklas Juul Jensen – 32:39; 6–3 Henrik Engelsen – 42:49; 6–4 Alex Jensen – 43:15 |

Energia Areena, Vantaa

| Russia | 2–14 | Finland |

Hartwall Areena, Helsinki

==== Group B ====
| Team | Pld | W | D | L | GF | GA | GD | Pts |
|---|---|---|---|---|---|---|---|---|
| Switzerland | 3 | 3 | 0 | 0 | 55 | 4 | +51 | 6 |
| Latvia | 3 | 2 | 0 | 1 | 35 | 7 | +28 | 4 |
| Poland | 3 | 1 | 0 | 2 | 12 | 22 | −10 | 2 |
| Singapore | 3 | 0 | 0 | 3 | 5 | 74 | −69 | 0 |

December 4, 2010

| Latvia | 2–6 | Switzerland |

Hartwall Areena, Helsinki

| Singapore | 4–10 | Poland |

Energia Areena, Vantaa

December 6, 2010

| Singapore | 1–27 | Latvia |

Hartwall Areena, Helsinki

| Poland | 2–12 | Switzerland |

Hartwall Areena, Helsinki

December 7, 2010

| Latvia | 6–0 | Poland |

Hartwall Areena, Helsinki

| Switzerland | 37–0 | Singapore |

Hartwall Areena, Helsinki

==== Group C ====
| Team | Pld | W | D | L | GF | GA | GD | Pts |
|---|---|---|---|---|---|---|---|---|
| Sweden | 3 | 3 | 0 | 0 | 81 | 3 | +78 | 6 |
| Estonia | 3 | 2 | 0 | 1 | 25 | 28 | −3 | 4 |
| Germany | 3 | 1 | 0 | 2 | 16 | 30 | −14 | 2 |
| Australia | 3 | 0 | 0 | 3 | 8 | 69 | −61 | 0 |

December 4, 2010

| Estonia | 1–21 | Sweden |
|---|---|---|
| 1–6 Oskar Salm – 21.55 | | 0–1 Jimmy Lindblom – 02.17; 0–2 Rasmus Sundstedt – 12.57; 0–3 Henrik Stenberg – 13.40; 0–4 Magnus Svensson – 14.14; 0–5 Mattias Helgesson – 15.35; 0–6 Mattias Samuelsson – 19.00; 1–7 Johan Samuelsson – 22.07; 1–8 Kim Nilsson – 23.57; 1–9 Fredrik Djurling – 25.30; 1–10 Magnus Svensson – 29.18; 1–11 Kim Nilsson – 29.27; 1–12 Mattias Helgesson – 30.01; 1–13 Magnus Svensson – 34.07; 1–14 Mattias Helgesson – 39.52; 1–15 Daniel Calebsson – 41.02; 1–16 Jim Canerstam – 42.01; 1–17 Fredrik Djurling – 45.52; 1–18 Fredrik Djurling – 48.17; 1–19 Henrik Stenberg – 48.38; 1–20 David Gillek – 49.29; 1–21 Karl-Johan Nilsson – 59.38 |

Hartwall Areena, Helsinki

| Germany | 12–3 | Australia |

Energia Areena, Vantaa

December 5, 2010

| Estonia | 6–3 | Germany |

Energia Areena, Vantaa

| Sweden | 39–1 | Australia |

Hartwall Areena, Helsinki

December 7, 2010

| Australia | 4–18 | Estonia |

Energia Areena, Vantaa

| Germany | 1–21 | Sweden |

Hartwall Areena, Helsinki

==== Group D ====
| Team | Pld | W | D | L | GF | GA | GD | Pts |
|---|---|---|---|---|---|---|---|---|
| Czech Republic | 3 | 2 | 1 | 0 | 45 | 5 | +40 | 5 |
| Norway | 3 | 2 | 1 | 0 | 34 | 7 | +27 | 5 |
| Italy | 3 | 1 | 0 | 2 | 5 | 29 | −24 | 2 |
| Japan | 3 | 0 | 0 | 3 | 3 | 46 | −43 | 0 |

December 4, 2010

| Italy | 0–16 | Czech Republic |

Hartwall Areena, Helsinki

| Norway | 18–1 | Japan |

Energia Areena, Vantaa

December 5, 2010

| Norway | 12–2 | Italy |

Hartwall Areena, Helsinki

| Japan | 1–25 | Czech Republic |

Hartwall Areena, Helsinki

December 6, 2010

| Italy | 3–1 | Japan |

Hartwall Areena, Helsinki

| Czech Republic | 4–4 | Norway |

Hartwall Areena, Helsinki

=== Playoff round ===
Quarterfinals
A1 | Finland | 12
B2 | Latvia | 2
D1 | Czech Republic | 3 (PS)
C2 | Estonia | 2
B1 | Sweden | 10
D2 | Norway | 1
C1 | Switzerland | 9
A2 | Russia | 2

Semifinals
Q1 | Finland | 6
Q4 | Czech Republic | 1
Q2 | Sweden | 3
Q3 | Switzerland | 2

Finals
W1 | Finland | 6
W2 | Sweden | 2

==== Quarter finals ====
December 8, 2010

| Finland | 12–2 | Latvia |

Hartwall Areena, Helsinki

| Czech Republic | 3 – 2 (PS) | Estonia |

Hartwall Areena, Helsinki

December 9, 2010

| Sweden | 10–1 | Norway |

Hartwall Areena, Helsinki

| Switzerland | 9–2 | Russia |

Hartwall Areena, Helsinki

==== Semi-finals ====
December 10, 2010

| Finland | 6–1 | Czech Republic |

Hartwall Areena, Helsinki

| Sweden | 3–2 | Switzerland |

Hartwall Areena, Helsinki

==== Bronze medal game ====
December 11, 2010

| Czech Republic | 9–3 | Switzerland |

Hartwall Areena, Helsinki

==== Gold medal game ====
December 11, 2010

| Finland | 6–2 | Sweden |

Hartwall Areena, Helsinki

=== Placement round ===
==== 13–16 ====
December 8, 2010

| Denmark | 24–1 | Singapore |

Energia Areena, Vantaa

| Australia | 3–2 | Japan |

Energia Areena, Vantaa

==== 9–12 ====
December 8, 2010

| Canada | 4–9 | Poland |

Hartwall Areena, Helsinki

| Germany | 8–4 | Italy |

Hartwall Areena, Helsinki

==== 15th place match ====
December 9, 2010

| Singapore | 6–8 | Japan |

Energia Areena, Vantaa

==== 13th place match ====
December 9, 2010

| Denmark | 13–4 | Australia |

Energia Areena, Vantaa

==== 11th place match ====
December 9, 2010

| Canada | 7–4 | Italy |

Hartwall Areena, Helsinki

==== 9th place match ====
December 9, 2010

| Poland | 6 – 5 (OT) | Germany |

Hartwall Areena, Helsinki

==== 5–8 ====
December 10, 2010

| Latvia | 8–1 | Estonia |

Hartwall Areena, Helsinki

| Norway | 11–6 | Russia |

Hartwall Areena, Helsinki

==== 5th place match ====
December 11, 2010

| Latvia | 6 – 5 (OT) | Norway |

Hartwall Areena, Helsinki

==== 3rd place match ====
December 11, 2010

| Czech Republic | 9–3 | Switzerland |

Hartwall Areena, Helsinki

== See also ==
- 2010 Men's Asia Pacific Floorball Championships
- 2010 Men's World Floorball Championships Qualifying
