= Erik Haghjoo =

American floorball player

Personal information
- Nationality: United States Sweden
- Born: December 30, 1976 (age 48) Umeå, Sweden

Sport
- Sport: Floorball
- Position: Forward
- Shoots: Right
- Team: United States national floorball team

Erik Haghjoo (born December 30, 1976) is a Swedish-American floorball player who plays as a forward. He has won seven caps for the United States national floorball team. He is currently signed with the Fresno Force of the North American Floorball League.

== Career statistics ==
=== International ===
Appearances, goals, assists, and points by national team and year
| National team | Year | Apps | Goals | Assists | Points |
|---|---|---|---|---|---|
| United States | 2019 | 2 | 0 | 0 | 0 |
| United States | 2020 | 5 | 1 | 1 | 2 |
| Total | | 7 | 1 | 1 | 2 |
