= Estonia men's national floorball team =

Estonia
- flag of Estonia
- Full name: Estonia Men's national floorball team
- Arena: TTÜ Sports Hall
- Capacity: 1,000
- Manager: Kadri Heinla
- Coach: (Estonia) Risto Lall
- IFF Ranking: 9th (2024)
- First game: 1–7, vs. Hungary (14 May 1995)
- Largest win: 18–4, vs. Austria (7 December 2010)
- Largest defeat: 1–21, vs. Sweden (4 December 2010)

The Estonia men's national floorball team is the national floorball team of Estonia, and a member of the International Floorball Federation. Estonia has competed in the first world championships in 1996. They played in lower divisions in later tournaments. The team has returned to the returned to the A division in 2008 and remained there since (as of 2024). Their best result is 7th place in 2010.

Estonia is ranked ninth in the IFF ranking, following their ninth-place finishes at the World Championships in 2024 and 2022.

== World Championships ==
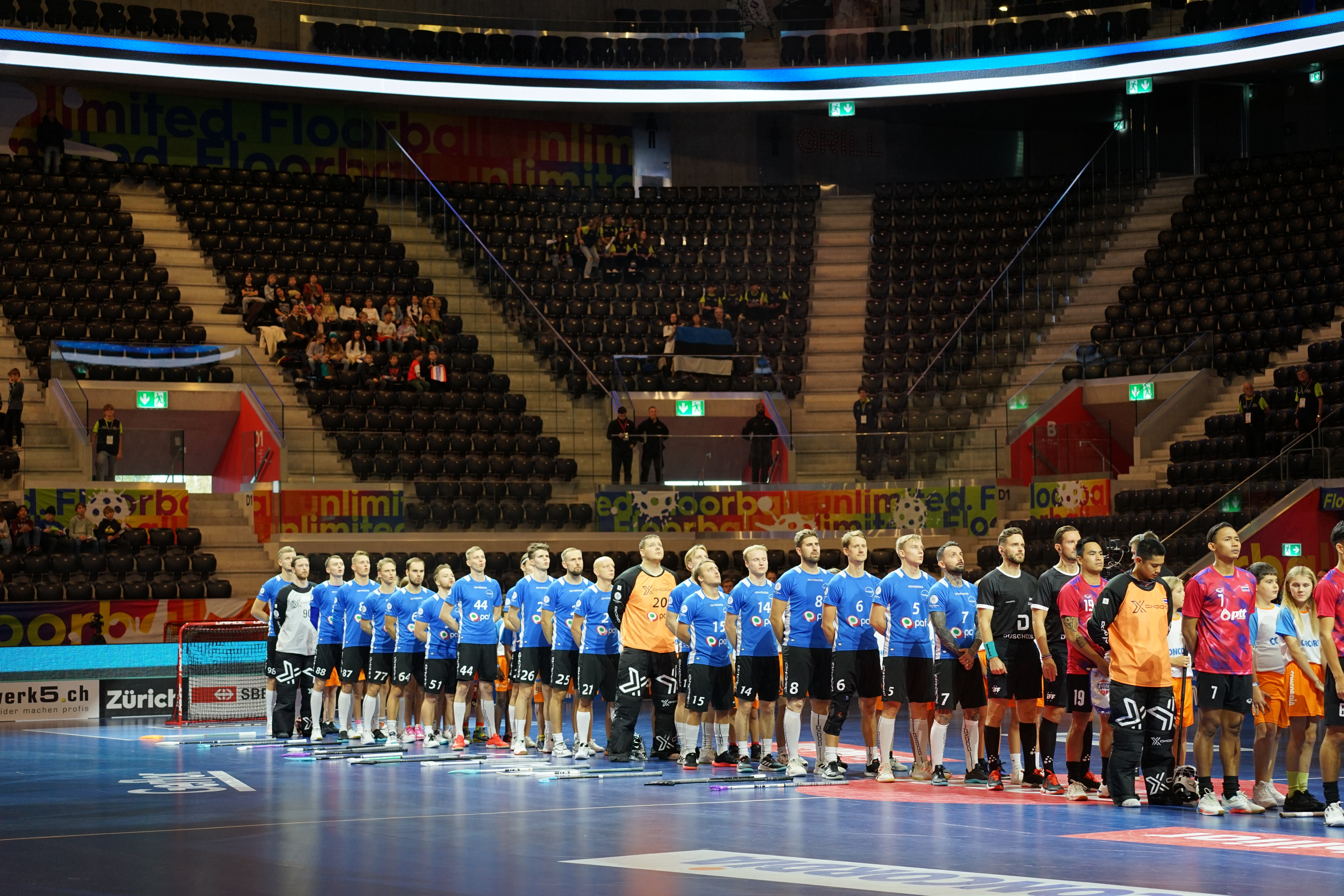
The team at the world championships 2022 in Switzerland

Year	Hosting Country	Rank
1996	Sweden	11th place
2008	Czech Republic	8th place
2010	Finland	7th place
2012	Switzerland	9th place
2014	Sweden	8th place
2016	Latvia	8th place
2018	Czech Republic	10th place
2020	Finland	8th place
2022	Switzerland	9th place
2024	Sweden	9th place
