= Ostravar Aréna =

Indoor arena in Ostrava, Czech Republic

Mustang Aréna
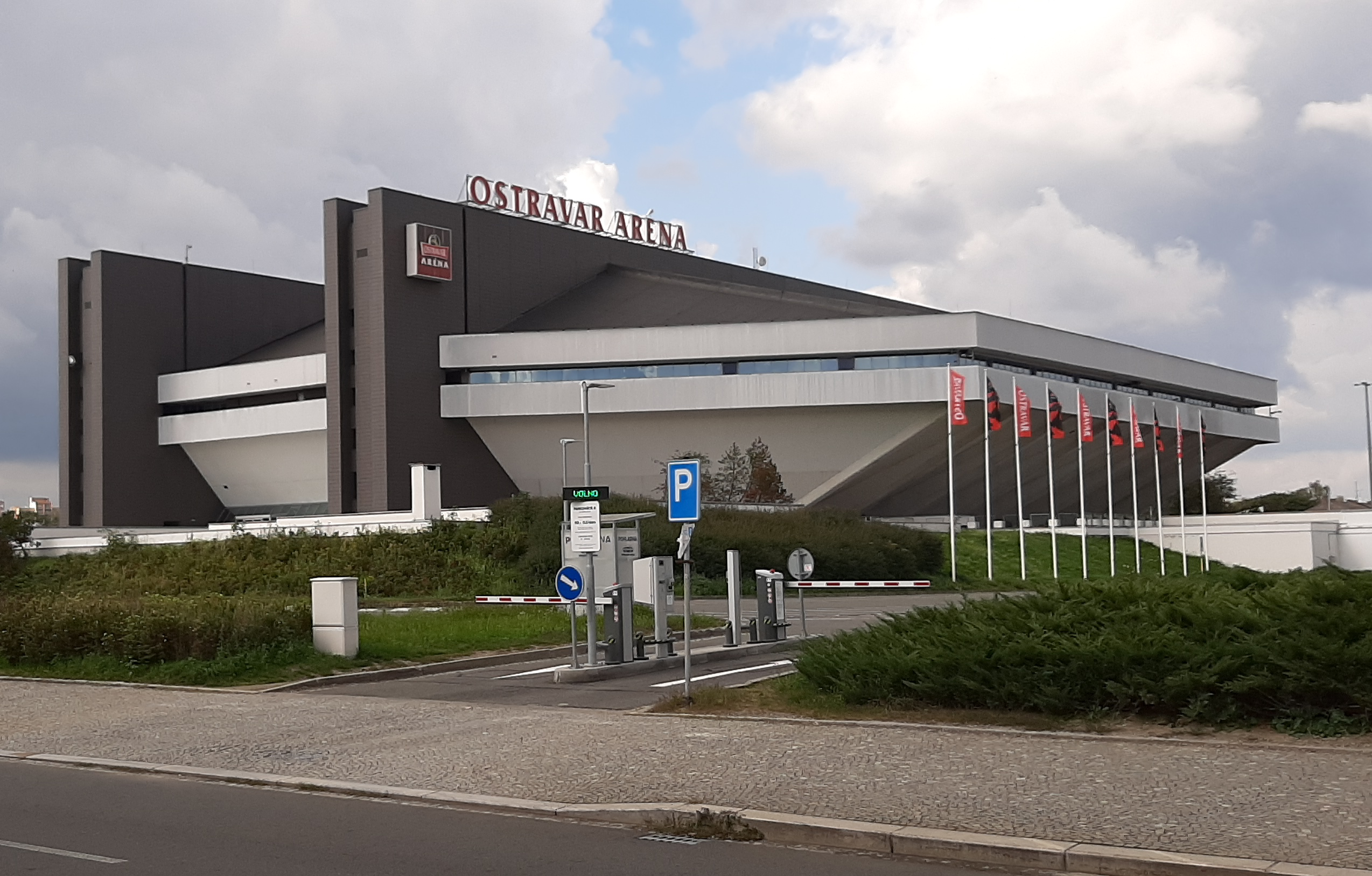
- Interactive map of Mustang Aréna
- Former names: Palác kultury a sportu VÍTKOVICE (1986–2004); ČEZ Aréna (2004–2015); Ostrava Aréna (2015–2016); OSTRAVAR Aréna (2016-2026)
- Location: Ostrava, Czech Republic
- Coordinates: 49°48′17″N 18°14′55″E
- Owner: Vítkovice Aréna, a. S.
- Capacity: 10,004

Construction
- Opened: 1986
- Renovated: 2003–2004
- Cost: 360 milion Kčs
- Architect: Vladimír Dedeček
- General contractor: VÍTKOVICE

Tenant
- HC Vítkovice

Website
- arena-vitkovice.cz/cs/ostravar-arena/

Mustang Aréna (previously OSTRAVAR ARENA, ČEZ Aréna, due to sponsorship reasons) is an indoor arena used mainly for ice hockey matches, in Vítkovice, Ostrava, Czech Republic. It opened in 1986, and underwent a € 23.3 million renovation between 2003 and 2004. The arena hosts home games of ice hockey club HC Vítkovice.

The capacity of the arena is 9,779, plus 16 skyboxes, making it the fourth-largest hockey venue in the Czech Republic. The rink can be converted into seating for concerts, increasing the capacity to 12,500.

== History ==
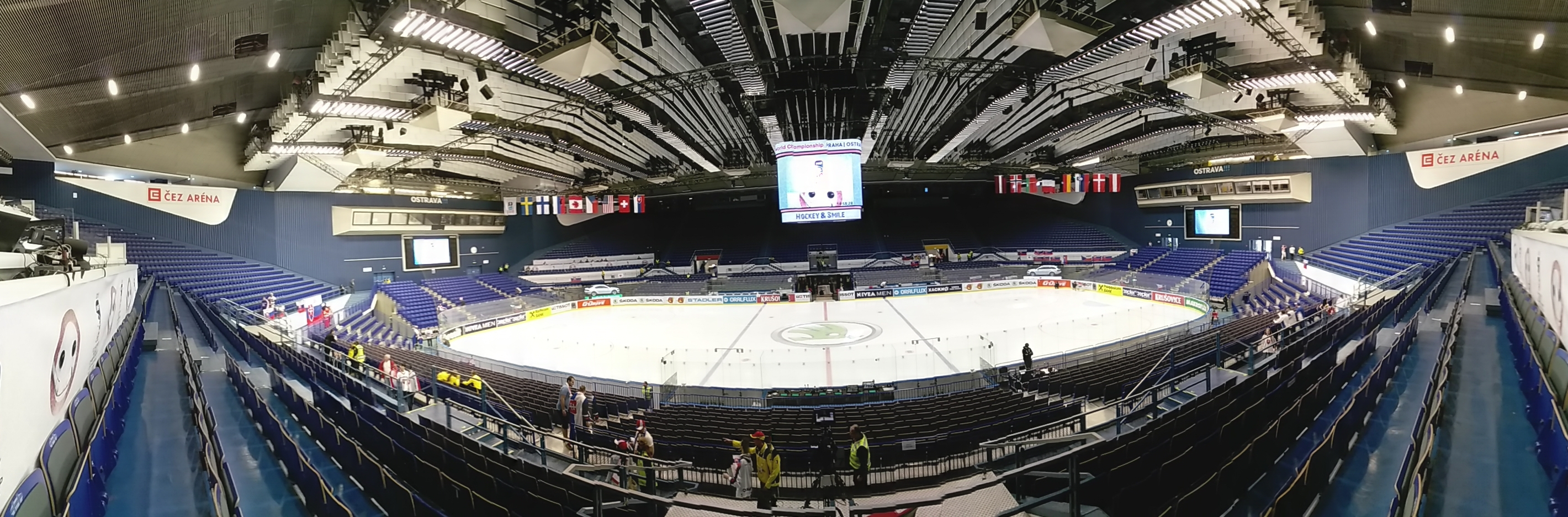
Interior of Ostravar Aréna (2015)

Work on the arena began in 1978, initiated by the then director of Vítkovice Ironworks, Rudolf Peška, and was completed in 1986. At that time, it was the biggest and most modern arena in Europe.

In November 2003, the arena was named ČEZ Aréna. In July 2015 its name was changed to Ostrava Aréna. In 2016 it was renamed OSTRAVAR Aréna after the local Ostravar Brewery.

In May 2011, Ostrava's Deputy Mayor for Investment, Jiří Srba, announced a plan to invest 10 million CZK in the stadium in the same year.

== Events ==
The arena has hosted numerous international sporting events in its history.

In ice hockey, it was the main venue for the 1994 and 2020 IIHF World Junior Championships. The arena was the secondary venue for the 2004, 2015 Men's World Ice Hockey Championships, and 2024 Men's Ice Hockey World Championships with Prague's O2 Arena.

In tennis, the arena is currently host of the Ostrava Open, a WTA 250-level event for female professional tennis players. The Czech Republic Davis Cup team has also played at the arena.

Events in other sports include the 1986 FIVB Women's World Championship, the 2005 UEFA Futsal Championship, group stage matches of the 2008 Men's World Floorball Championships. In 2010, the arena hosted the Table Tennis European Championships and the 2010 FIBA World Championship for Women.

== See also ==
- List of indoor arenas in the Czech Republic
- List of European ice hockey arenas

Preceded by PalaMaggiò; Caserta	UEFA Futsal Championship; Final Venue; 2005	Succeeded by Gondomar; Porto
