= Floorball at the 2017 World Games =

- Venue: WKK Sport Center
- Dates: 27–30 July 2017
- No. of events: 1
- Competitors: from 6 nations

Medalists
1st place, gold medalist(s)		Sweden
2nd place, silver medalist(s)		Switzerland
3rd place, bronze medalist(s)		Finland

The floorball competition at the 2017 World Games took place from 27 to 30 July 2017, in Wrocław, Poland.

== Results ==
=== Preliminary round ===
==== Group A ====
Pos	Team	Pld	W	D	L	GF	GA	GD	Pts	Qualification	Finland	Czech Republic	Poland
1	Finland	2	2	0	0	9	3	+6	4	Semifinals	—	4–2	5–0
2	Czech Republic	2	1	0	1	14	4	+10	2	Semifinals	2–4	—	12–1
3	Poland (H)	2	0	0	2	1	17	−16	0	5th place play-off	0–5	12–1	—

Source: IFF
(H) Hosts

27 July 2017; 12:00	Finland	4–2 (1–1, 1–1, 2–0)	Czech Republic	WKK Sport Center

Game reference

27 July 2017; 20:00	Poland	0–5 (0–2, 0–0, 0–3)	Finland	WKK Sport Center

Game reference

28 July 2017; 17:30	Czech Republic	12–1 (6–0, 5–1, 1–0)	Poland	WKK Sport Center

Game reference

==== Group B ====
Pos	Team	Pld	W	D	L	GF	GA	GD	Pts	Qualification	Sweden	Switzerland	United States
1	Sweden	2	2	0	0	23	0	+23	4	Semifinals	—	3–0	20–0
2	Switzerland	2	1	0	1	17	3	+14	2	Semifinals	0–3	—	17–0
3	United States	2	0	0	2	0	37	−37	0	5th place play-off	0–20	0–17	—

Source: IFF

27 July 2017; 17:30	Switzerland	17–0 (6–0, 7–0, 4–0)	United States	WKK Sport Center

Game reference

28 July 2017; 12:00	United States	0–20 (0–9, 0–5, 0–6)	Sweden	WKK Sport Center

Game reference

28 July 2017; 20:00	Sweden	3–0 (6–0, 5–1, 1–0)	Switzerland	WKK Sport Center

Game reference

=== Knock-out stage ===
Semi-finals
29 July
Finland	2
Switzerland	5
29 July
Sweden	5
Czech Republic	2

Final
30 July
Switzerland	5
Sweden	7
Bronze medal game
30 July
Finland	2
Czech Republic	0

==== Semifinals ====
29 July 2017; 14:30	Finland	2–5 (0–1, 0–2, 2–2)	Switzerland	WKK Sport Center

Game reference

29 July 2017; 17:00	Sweden	5–2 (0–0, 3–1, 2–1)	Czech Republic	WKK Sport Center

Game reference

==== 5th place match ====
29 July 2017; 20:00	Poland	1–4 (1–2, 0–0, 0–2)	United States	WKK Sport Center

Game reference

==== Bronze medal game ====
30 July 2017; 11:00	Finland	2–0 (0–0, 1–0, 1–0)	Czech Republic	WKK Sport Center

Game reference

==== Final ====
30 July 2017; 14:30	Switzerland	5–7 (2–1, 3–4, 0–2)	Sweden	WKK Sport Center

Game reference

== Final ranking ==
Rank	Team
1st place, gold medalist(s)	Sweden
2nd place, silver medalist(s)	Switzerland
3rd place, bronze medalist(s)	Finland
4	Czech Republic
5	United States
6	Poland
