= Latvia men's national floorball team =

- Nickname(s): Team Latvia
- Founded: 1993
- Coach: (Finland) Heikki Luukkonen
- Captain: Artis Raitums
- IFF Ranking: 4th (2024)

The Latvia men's national floorball team is the national floorball team of Latvia, and a member of the International Floorball Federation. The team played its first international match in 1995.

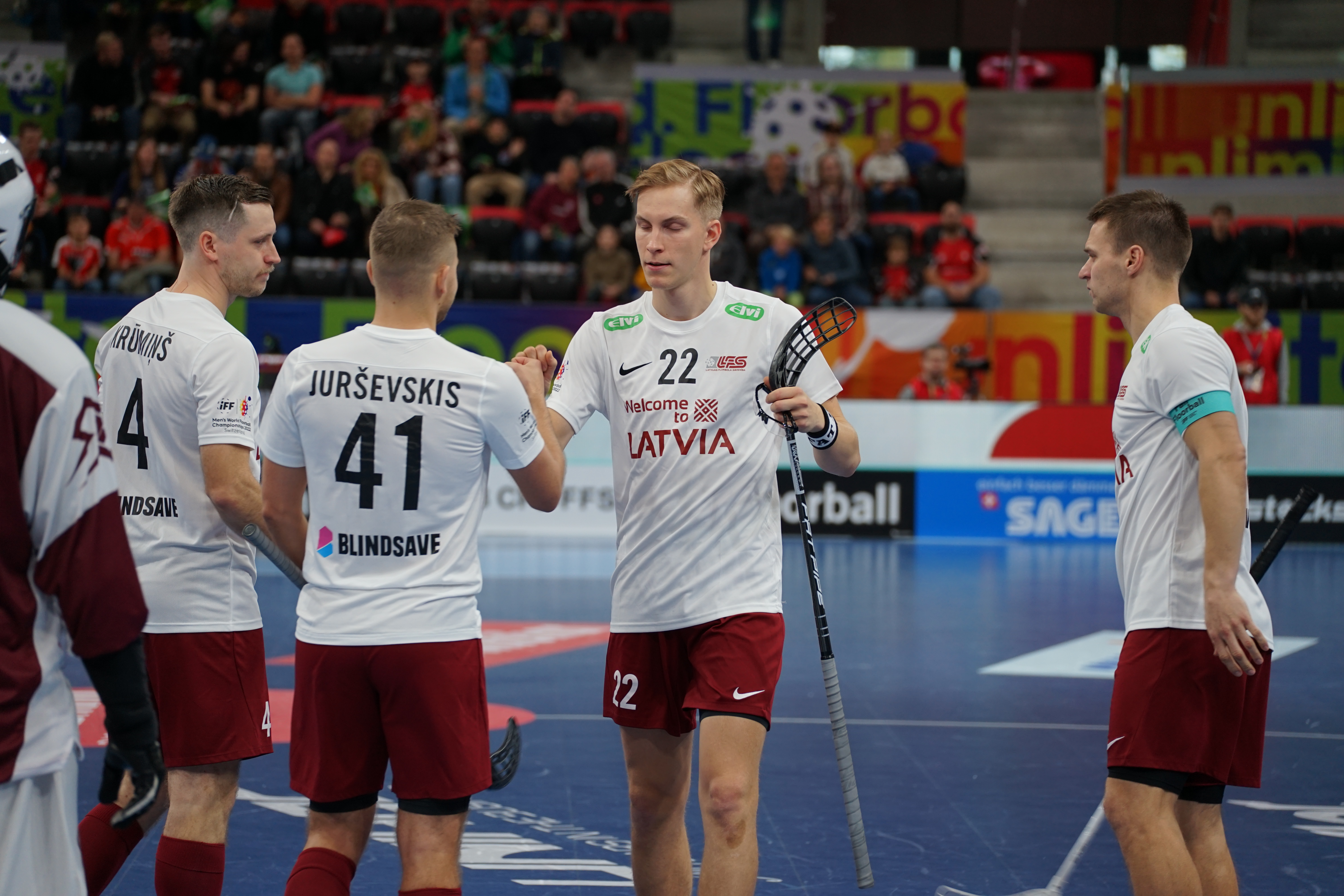
Latvian players in a match at the 2022 World Championships

The team has participated in all World Championships to date, though not in the preceding European Championships, and in the 1998 edition, it played only in the B-Division. Its best result is fourth place at the most recent World Championships in 2024, following a victory over Switzerland in the quarterfinals. With this, Latvia became the first team since 2012 outside of the Czech Republic, Finland, Sweden, and Switzerland to compete for medals, and the eighth team in history overall. Thanks to a strong performance at the previous championship as well, Latvia climbed to fourth place in the IFF World Ranking, becoming the first new country to do so in 23 years.

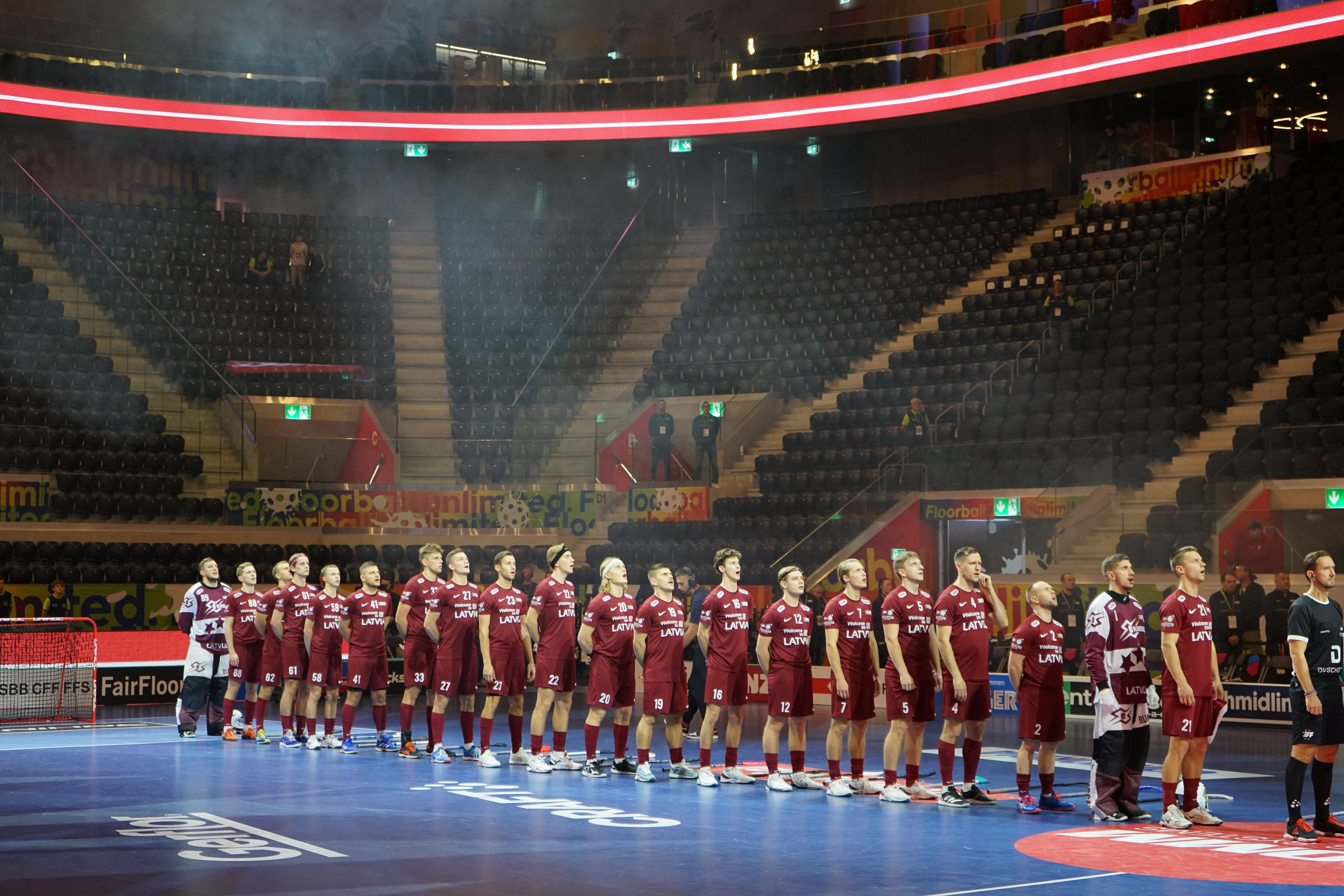
Latvian national team before a match at the 2022 World Championships

Conversely, Latvia recorded its worst placement in 2016, when at the tournament hosted in Latvia, they failed to even reach the quarterfinals and ultimately finished in 10th place. The Latvians have also participated in the last two floorball tournaments at the World Games. At the 2022 Games, after defeating Switzerland and drawing with Sweden in the group stage, Latvia competed for medals at a major international tournament for the first time and finished in fourth place.

Latvia is ranked fourth in the IFF ranking (behind the Czech Republic and ahead of Switzerland), following their fourth and fifth-place finishes at the World Championships in 2024 and 2022.

== World Championship ==
Year	Hosting Country	Rank	Final match
1996	Sweden	9th place	Hungary 7–4 – Relegated to B-Division
1998 B	Czech Republic	1st place	Round robin – Promoted to A-Division
2000	Norway	7th place	Russia 5–4
2002	Finland	7th place	Germany 6–5 OT
2004	Switzerland	6th place	Norway 4–6
2006	Sweden	5th place	Denmark 5–4
2008	Czech Republic	5th place	Norway 6–5
2010	Finland	5th place	Norway 6–5 OT
2012	Switzerland	6th place	Norway 5–7
2014	Sweden	5th place	Norway 4–3
2016	Latvia	10th place	Slovakia 5–6 OT
2018	Czech Republic	5th place	Germany 5–3
2020	Finland	5th place	Norway 4–2
2022	Switzerland	5th place	Germany 8–3
2024	Sweden	4th place	Czech Republic 2–8

== World Games ==
Year	Host country	Rank	Final match
2022	United States	4th place	Czech Republic 3–7
2025	China	5th place	Canada 12–3

== Rankings and Records ==
=== IFF World Floorball Championships record ===
Year	Pld	W	D *	L	GF	GA	Plus/minus
(Sweden) 1996	6	2	0	4	15	51	-36
(Czech Republic) 1998*	5	5	0	0	48	8	+40
(Norway) 2000	4	1	0	3	10	19	-9
(Finland) 2002	4	1	0	3	11	32	-21
(Switzerland) 2004	5	1	0	4	19	31	-12
(Sweden) 2006	5	3	0	2	26	31	-5
(Czech Republic) 2008	5	3	0	2	26	28	-2
(Finland) 2010	5	3	0	2	41	24	17
(Switzerland) 2012	6	4	0	2	37	21	16
(Sweden) 2014	7	4	0	3	29	33	-4

- played in B-Division

== Gallery ==
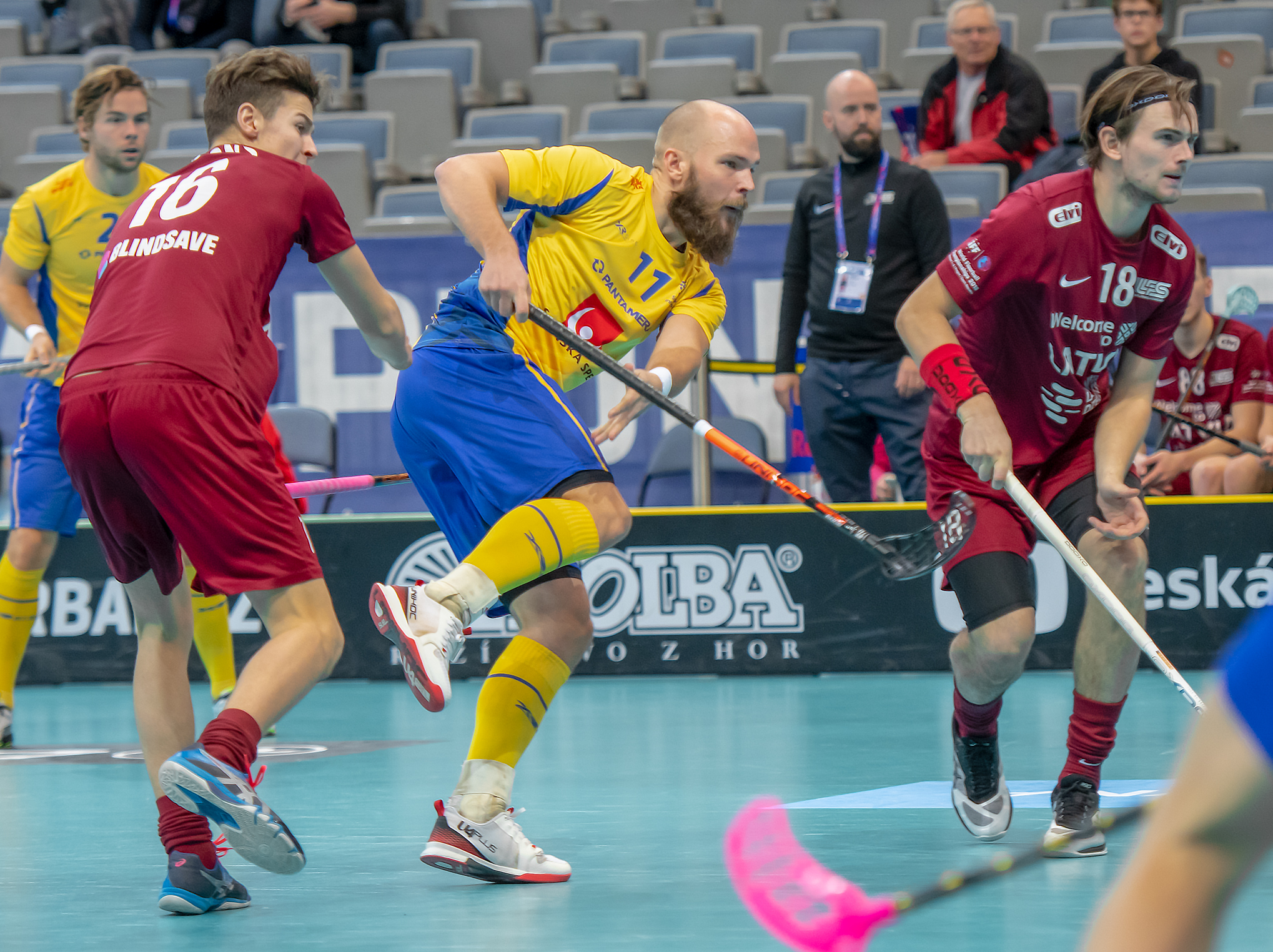
Latvian players in the quarterfinal against Sweden at the 2018 World Championships in Prague

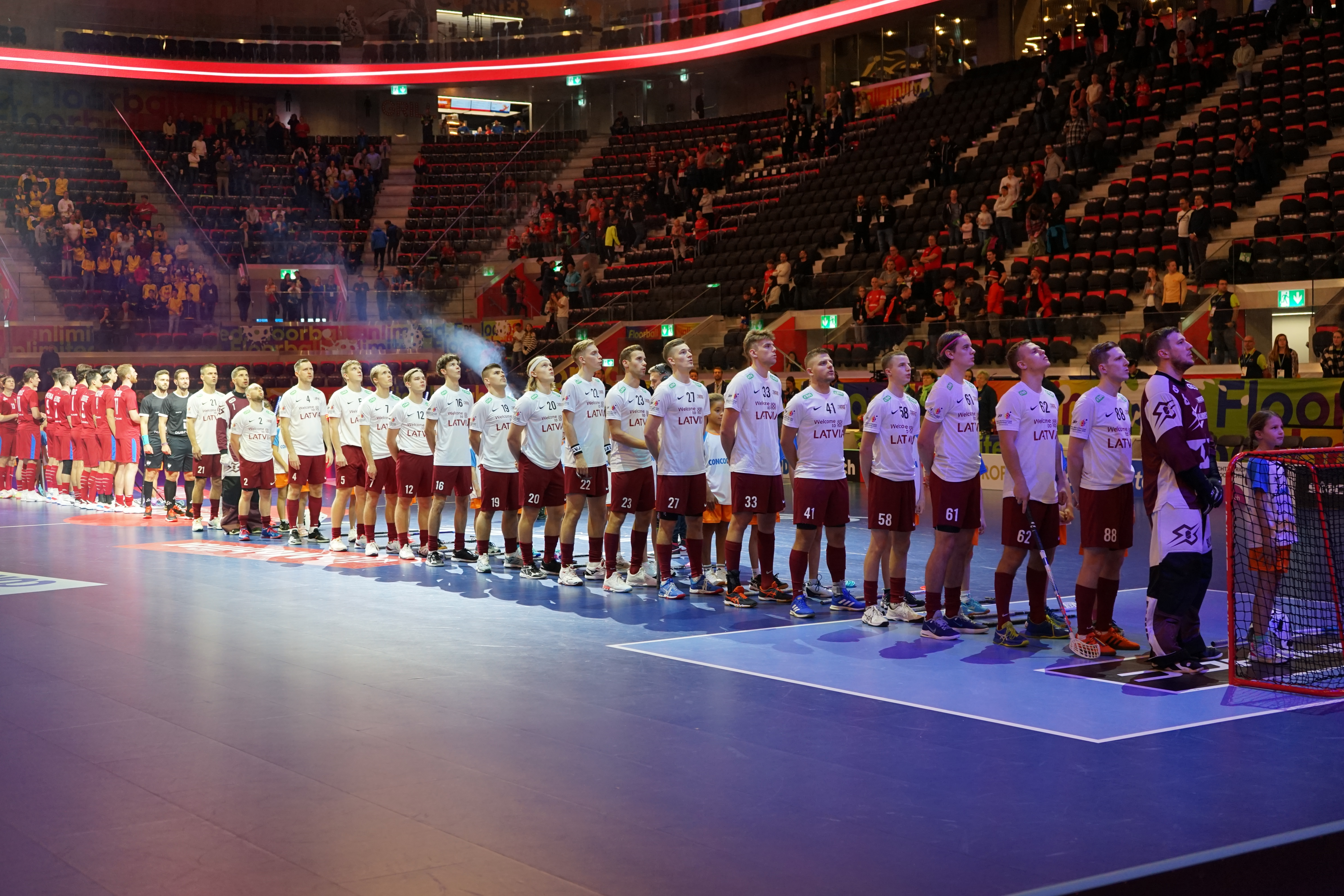
Latvian team at the 2022 World Championships before a match against the Czech Republic

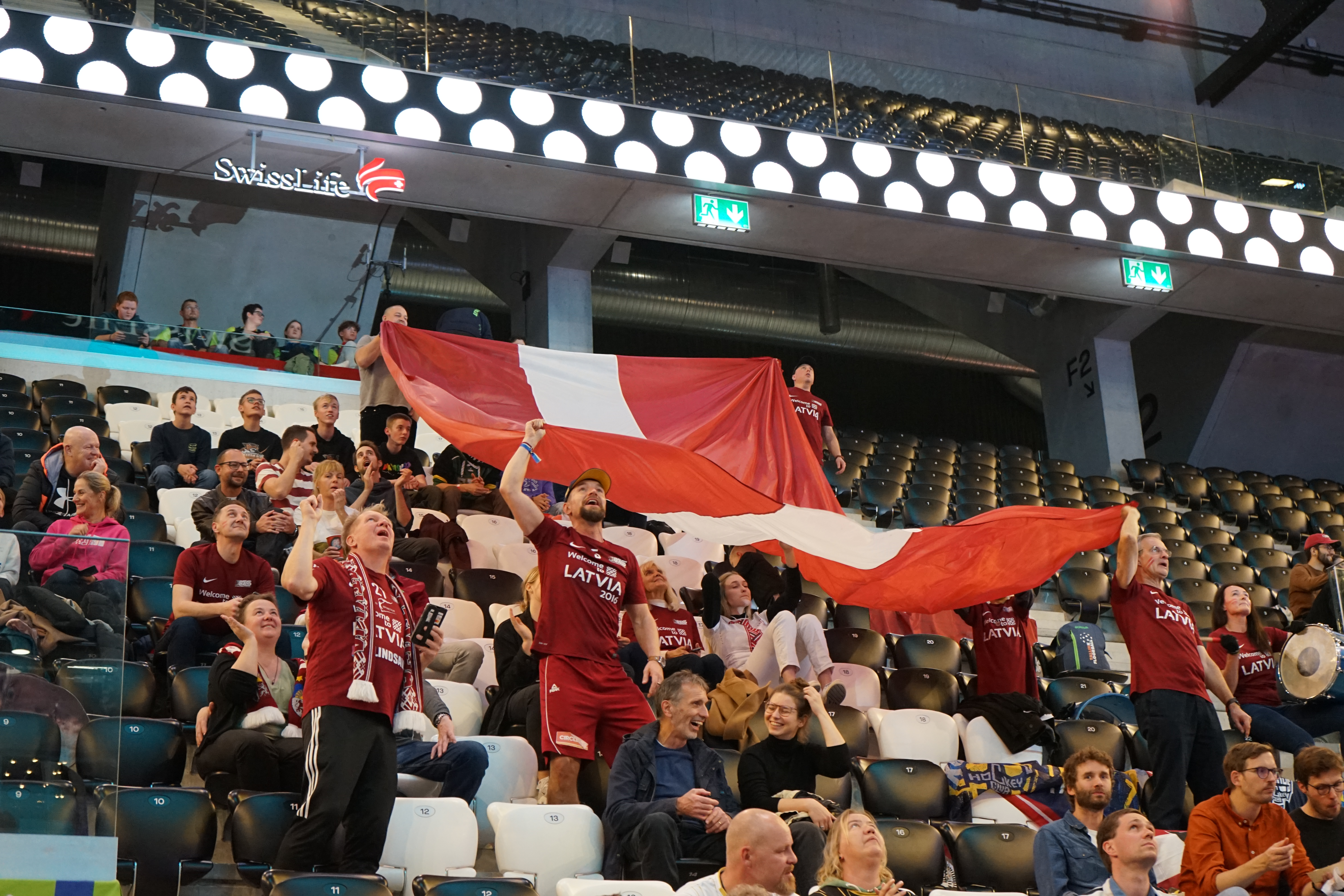
Fans of the Latvian national team in a match against Germany at the 2022 World Championships

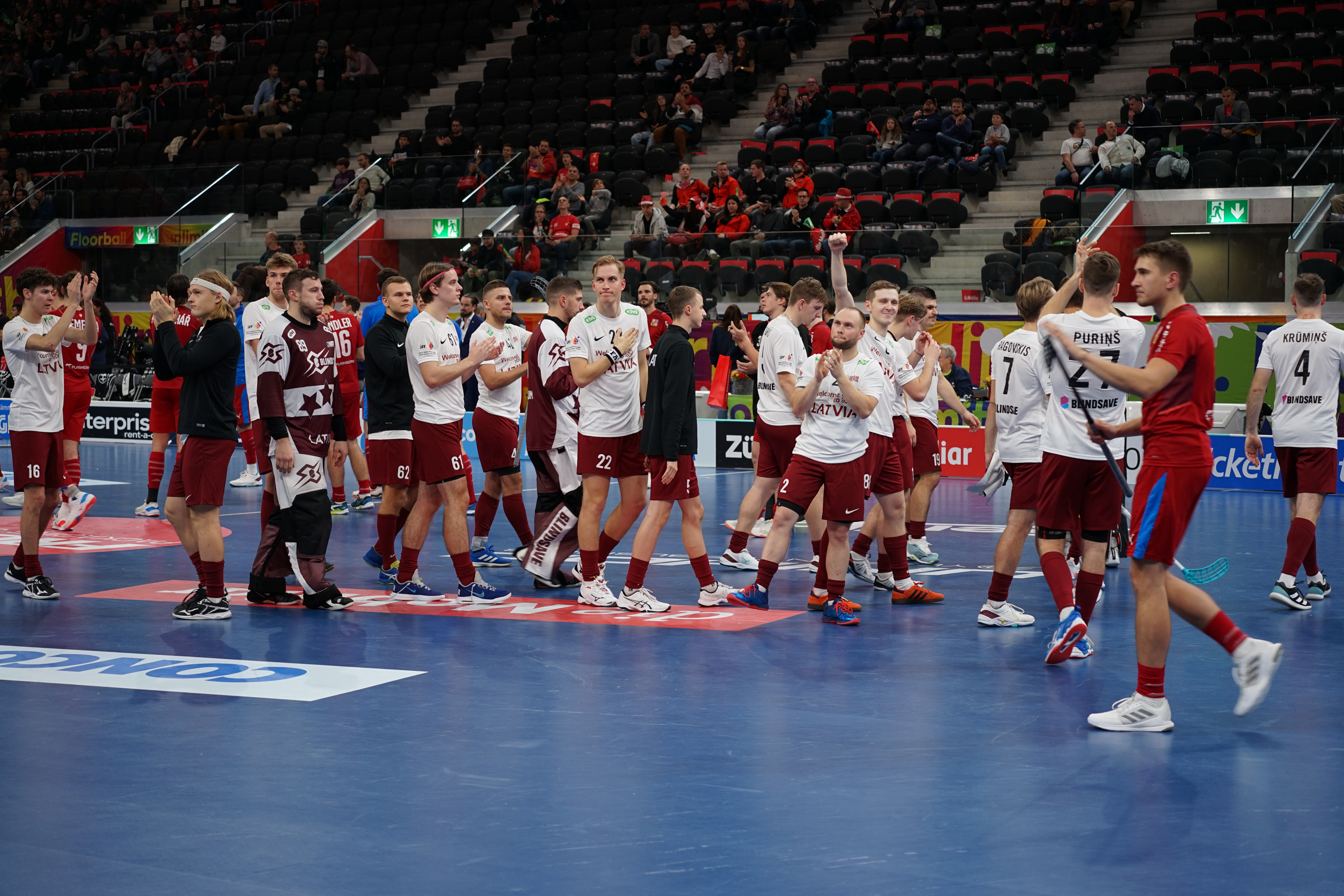
Latvian national team after a match against the Czech Republic at the 2022 World Championships

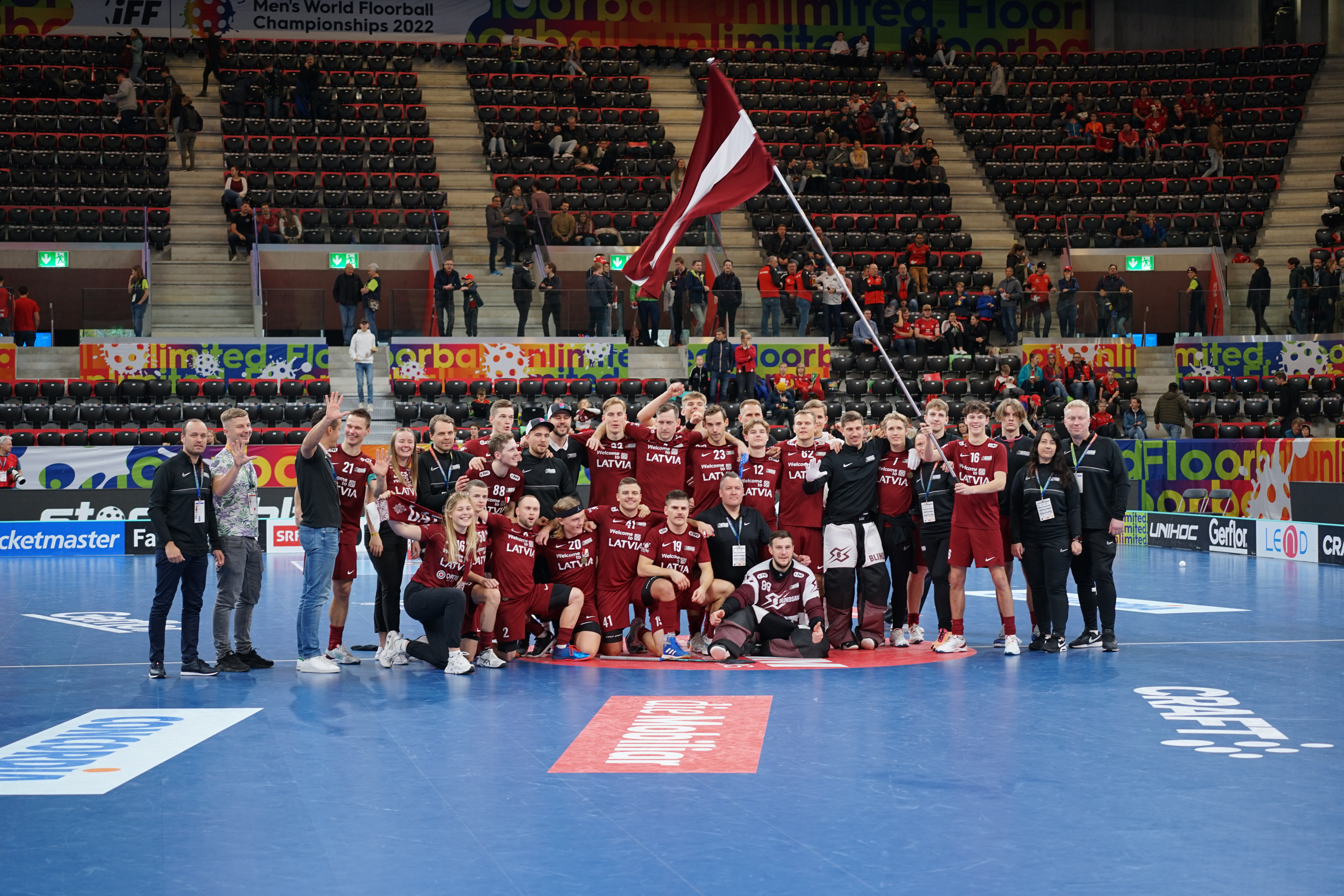
Latvian national team after winning the 5th place match against Germany at the 2022 World Championships

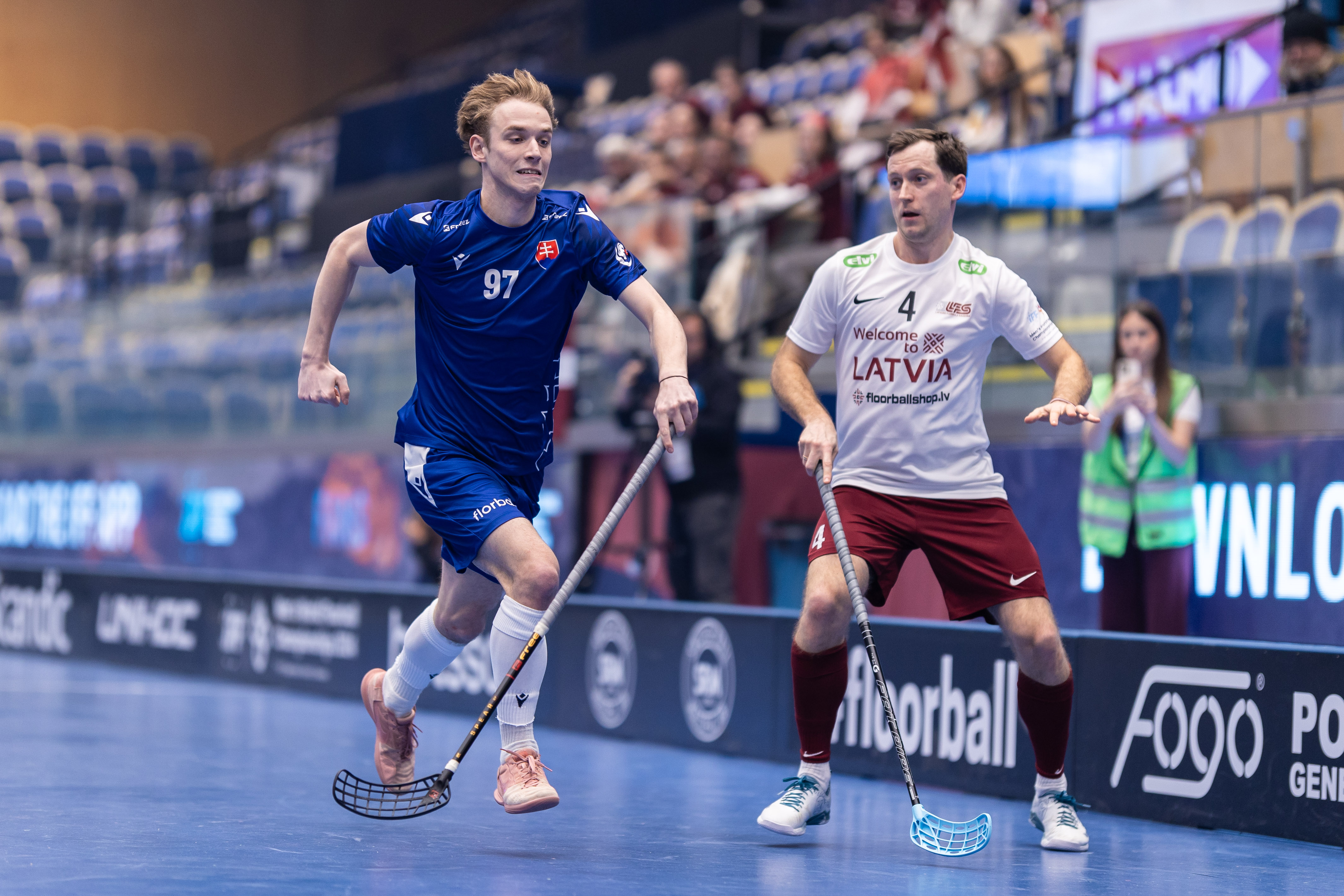
Latvian player in a match against Slovakia at the 2024 World Championships

== See also ==
- Latvia women's national floorball team
- Latvia women's national under-19 floorball team
