= 2008 Men's World Floorball Championships =

Floorball competition

A-Division

Tournament details
- Host country: Czech Republic
- Venue(s): 3 (in 2 host cities)
- Dates: 6–14 December 2008
- Teams: 10

Final positions
- Champions: Finland (1st title)
- Runner-up: Sweden
- Third place: Switzerland

Tournament statistics
- Matches played: 27
- Goals scored: 321 (11.89 per match)
- Scoring leader(s): (Sweden) Fredrik Djurling

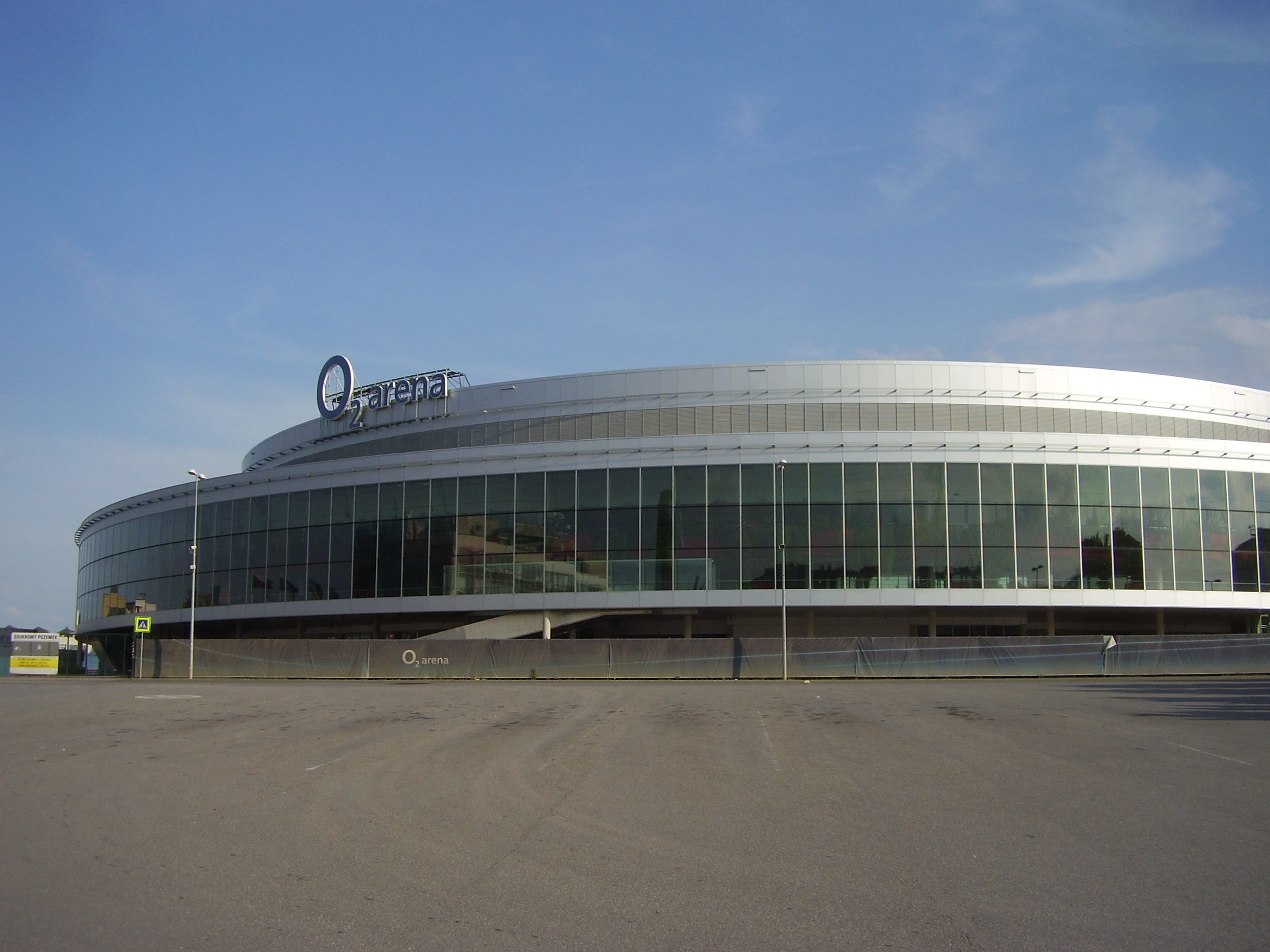
O_{2} Arena was hosting playoffs

The 2008 Men's World Floorball Championships were the seventh men's Floorball World Championships. The tournament was held from 6 to 14 December 2008. The tournament took place in the cities of Prague and Ostrava. All group stage matches were played in Ostrava's ČEZ Aréna, and all playoff matches were played in Prague's O_{2} Arena, with the exception of the 9th place match, which was played in Prague's Sparta Arena.

Finland won its first championship by defeating Sweden in overtime in the gold medal game, breaking Sweden's row of six championship victories. This was also the first-ever lost game for the Swedish team in world championships.

== Championship schedule ==
=== Preliminary round ===
==== Group A ====
Team	Pld	W	D	L	GF	GA	GD	Pts
Sweden	4	4	0	0	53	9	+44	8
Czech Republic	4	3	0	1	29	11	+18	6
Latvia	4	2	0	2	20	23	−3	4
Russia	4	0	1	3	12	37	−25	1
Italy	4	0	1	3	12	46	−34	1

6 December 2008	Sweden	18–0	Italy	ČEZ Aréna, Ostrava

Russia	1–8	Czech Republic	ČEZ Aréna, Ostrava

7 December 2008	Latvia	4–3	Russia	ČEZ Aréna, Ostrava

Czech Republic	4–5	Sweden	ČEZ Aréna, Ostrava

8 December 2008	Italy	3–9	Latvia	ČEZ Aréna, Ostrava

Russia	1–18	Sweden	ČEZ Aréna, Ostrava

9 December 2008	Italy	7–7	Russia	ČEZ Aréna, Ostrava

Latvia	3–5	Czech Republic	ČEZ Aréna, Ostrava

10 December 2008	Sweden	12–4	Latvia	ČEZ Aréna, Ostrava

Czech Republic	12–2	Italy	ČEZ Aréna, Ostrava

==== Group B ====
Team	Pld	W	D	L	GF	GA	GD	Pts
Finland	4	4	0	0	34	7	+27	8
Switzerland	4	3	0	1	28	17	+11	6
Norway	4	2	0	2	31	32	−1	4
Estonia	4	1	0	3	18	32	−14	2
Denmark	4	0	0	4	11	34	−23	0

6 December 2008	Estonia	6–7	Switzerland	ČEZ Aréna, Ostrava

Norway	7–3	Denmark	ČEZ Aréna, Ostrava

7 December 2008	Finland	7–0	Estonia	ČEZ Aréna, Ostrava

Switzerland	9–6	Norway	ČEZ Aréna, Ostrava

8 December 2008	Denmark	2–8	Finland	ČEZ Aréna, Ostrava

Estonia	5–13	Norway	ČEZ Aréna, Ostrava

9 December 2008	Denmark	5–7	Estonia	ČEZ Aréna, Ostrava

Finland	4–0	Switzerland	ČEZ Aréna, Ostrava

10 December 2008	Norway	5–15	Finland	ČEZ Aréna, Ostrava

Switzerland	12–1	Denmark	ČEZ Aréna, Ostrava

== Playoffs ==
Semifinals
A1	Sweden	3 (OT)
B2	Switzerland	2
B1	Finland	4
A2	Czech Republic	2

Finals
Sweden	6
Finland	7 (OT)

=== Semi-finals ===
13 December 2008	Sweden	3–2 (OT)	Switzerland	O_{2} Arena, Prague

Game reference

Finland	4–2	Czech Republic	O_{2} Arena, Prague

Game reference

=== Bronze medal match ===
14 December 2008	Switzerland	5–4 (OT)	Czech Republic	O_{2} Arena, Prague

Game reference

=== Championship match ===
14 December 2008	Sweden	6–7 (OT)	Finland	O_{2} Arena, Prague

Game reference

== Placement round ==
=== 9th place match ===
13 December 2008	Italy	2–5	Denmark	Sparta Arena, Prague

Game reference

=== 7th place match ===
13 December 2008	Estonia	8–14	Russia	O_{2} Arena, Prague

Game reference

=== 5th place match ===
14 December 2008	Latvia	6–5	Norway	O_{2} Arena, Prague

Game reference

== Ranking and statistics ==
=== Final ranking ===
Gold medal	Finland
Silver medal	Sweden
Bronze medal	Switzerland
4	Czech Republic
5	Latvia
6	Norway
7	Russia
8	Estonia
9	Denmark
10	Italy

=== All-star team ===
Tournament all-star team:

- Best goalkeeper: (Finland) Henri Toivoniemi
- Best defenders: (Czech Republic) Daniel Folta, (Sweden) Henrik Quist
- Best center: (Sweden) Fredrik Djurling
- Best forwards: (Czech Republic) Aleš Zálesný, (Finland) Santtu Manner
