= Fredrik Djurling =

Swedish floorball player

Fredrik Djurling, born 1981 in Järfälla is a Swedish former floorball player, having played for AIK Innebandy and the national team of Sweden until his retirement in 2011. He grew up in Järfälla, Sweden and played for Järfälla IBK until April 2007 when he signed up for the Swedish team AIK Innebandy. He won the World Cup in 2006.
