= Czech Republic men's national floorball team =

- Founded: 1994
- Coach: (Czech Republic) Jaroslav Berka
- Captain: (Czech Republic) Ondřej Němeček
- IFF Ranking: 3rd (2024)

The Czech men's national floorball team, presented as Czechia, is the national floorball team of the Czech Republic, and a member of the International Floorball Federation (IFF).

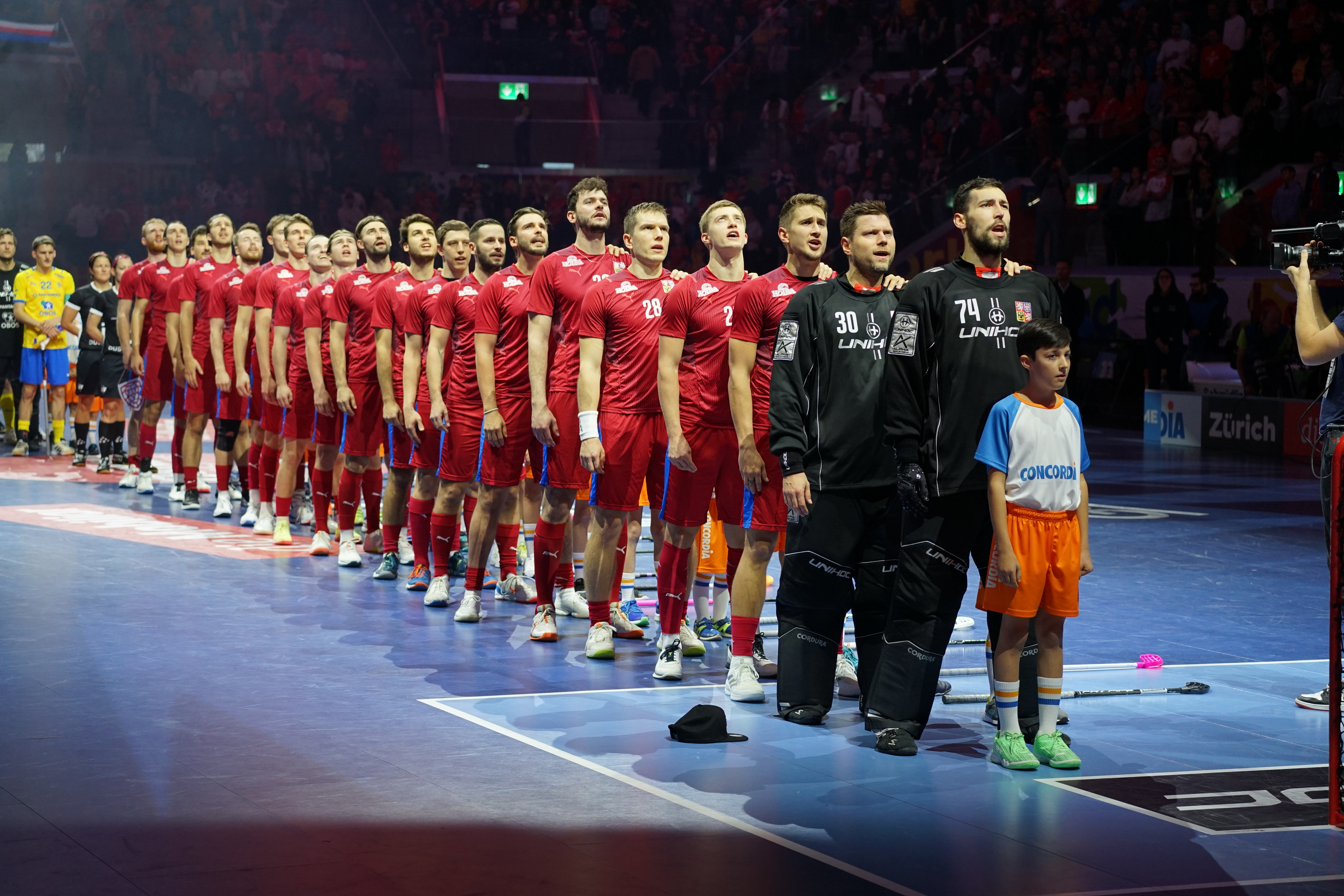
Czech national floorball team at 2022 World Championships

The team has participated in all World and European Championships as well as floorball tournaments at the World Games. Its biggest successes are silver medals from the 5th World Championships in 2004 and 14th World Championships in 2022, which both took place in Switzerland. The team also won four bronze medals in 2010, 2014, 2021 and 2024. That makes Czech team the third most successful team after Sweden and Finland and before fourth Switzerland.

At the last two World Games in 2022 and 2025, they won bronze medals. In the IFF ranking, the team is third (behind Sweden and Finland and ahead of Latvia), following their mentioned third and second-place finishes at the World Championships in 2024 and 2022.

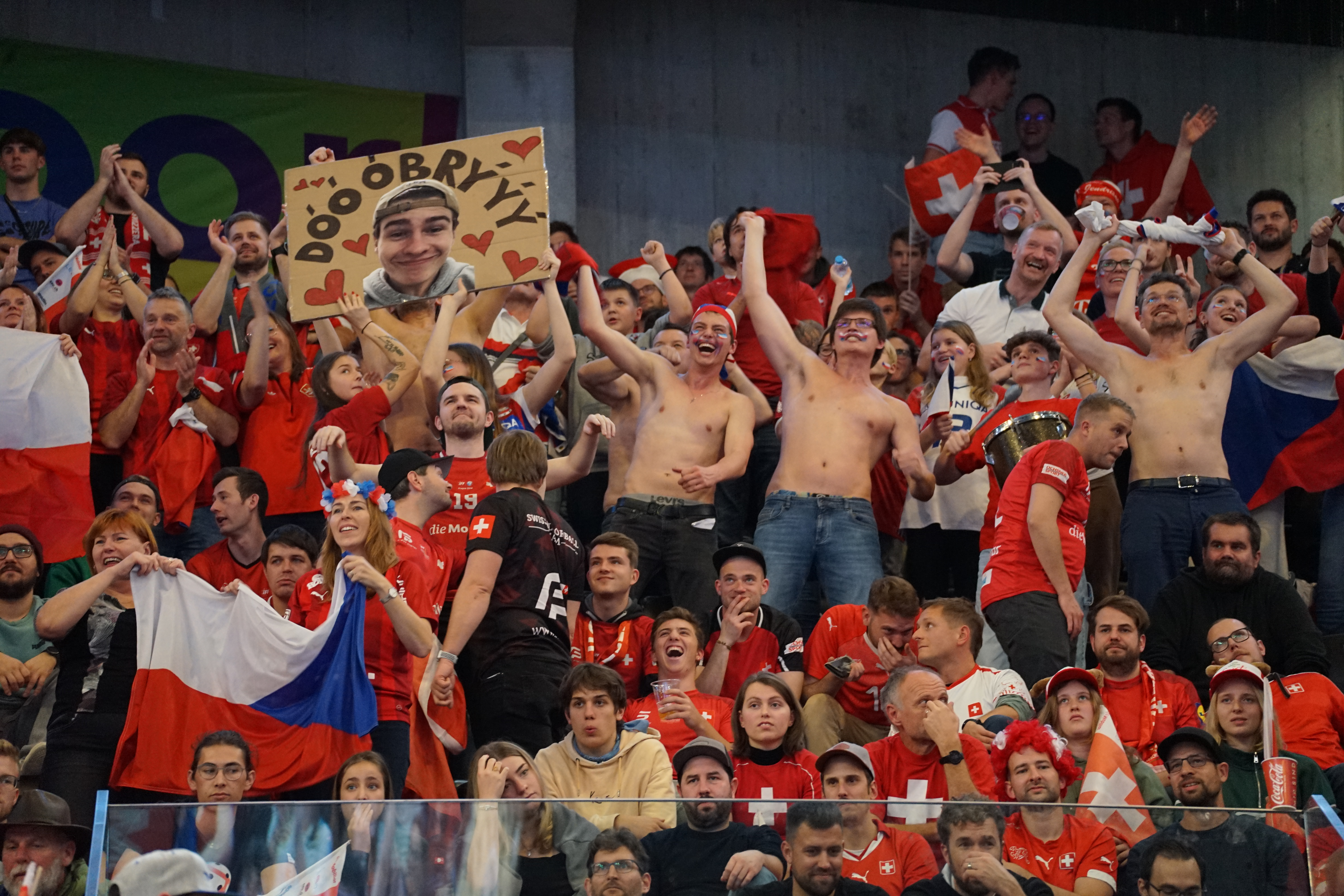
Fans of Czech national floorball team at 2022 World Championships

== Milestones ==
The Czech men's national floorball team was founded at the turn of 1993 and 1994. They have played their first friendly match in February 1994 against Switzerland and competed at the European Championships in the same year.

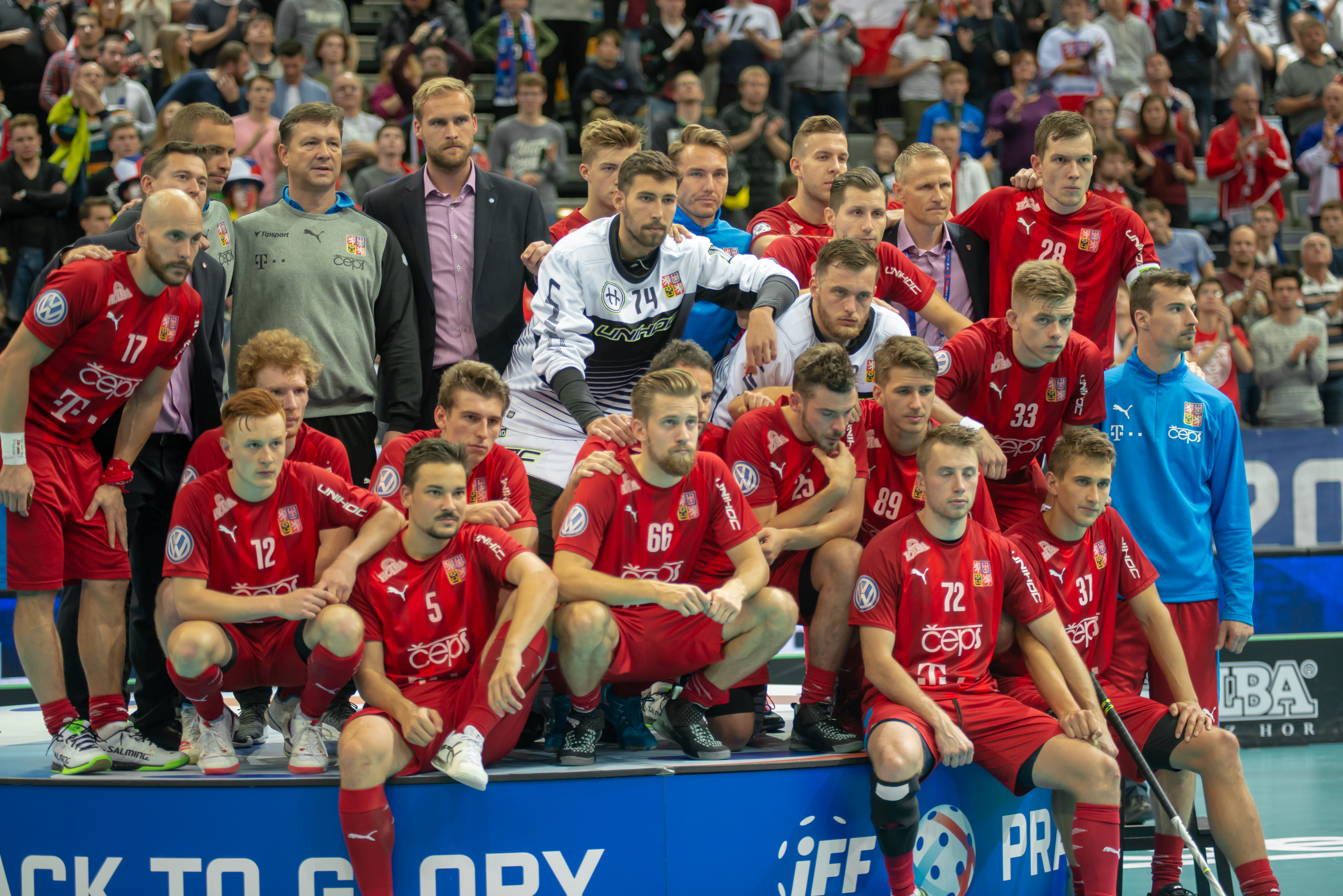
The Czech national team after losing the bronze medal match at the 2018 World Championships

They first fought for medals at the first World Championships in 1996 in the bronze medal match against Norway. The Czechs defeated the Finnish team for the first time in the group stage at the 2002 World Championship. Since then, however, they have never won over Finland at the World Championship. In 2004, they have defeated Switzerland for the first time at World Championship. It was in semifinals, which earned the Czech team its first medal and the silver.

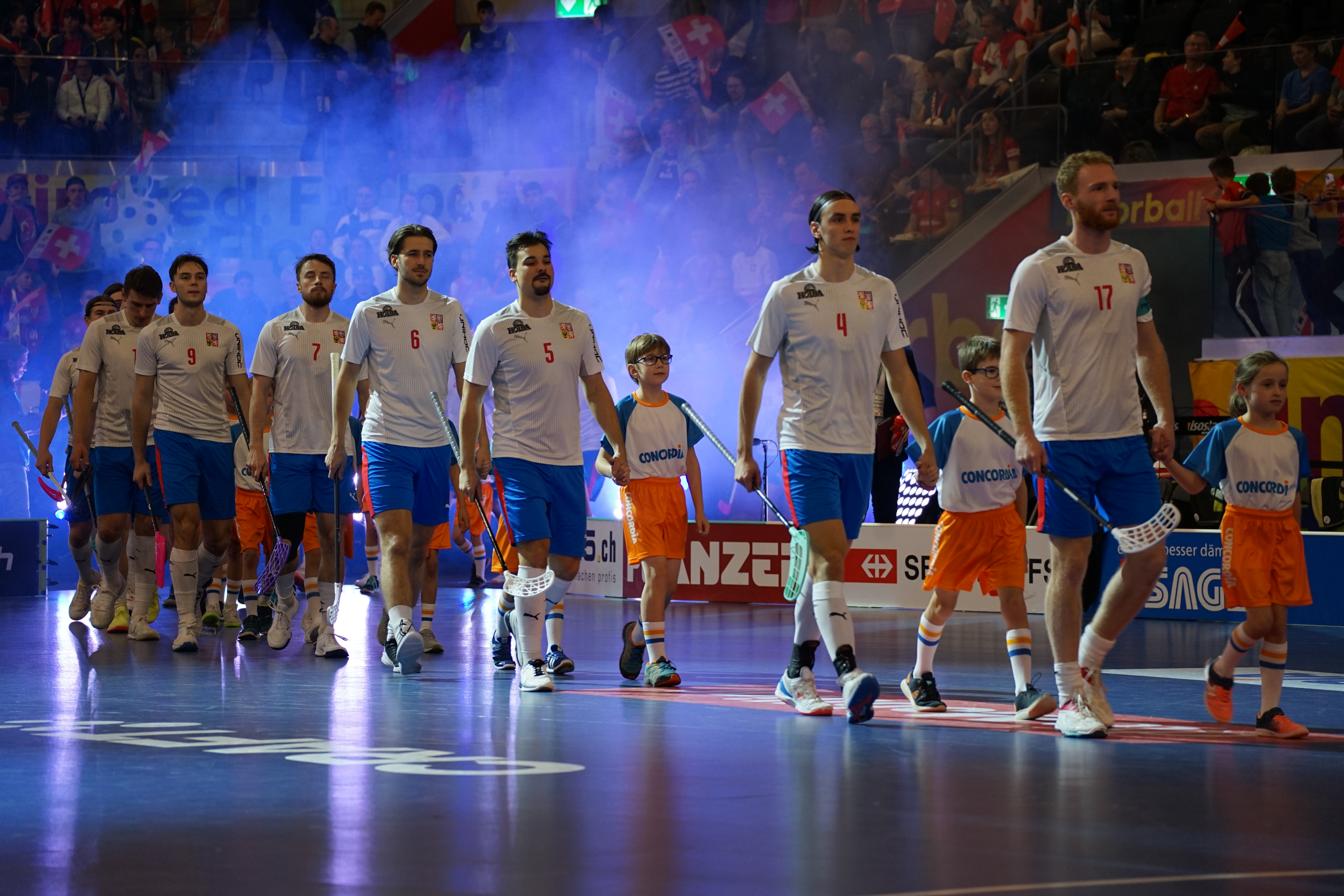
The Czech national team lining up before the semifinal at the 2022 World Championships

The Czechs defeated the Swedish team for the first time at the home Euro Floorball Tour in April 2014, where they also won against Finland and Switzerland, thus dominating the tournament for the first time. The Czechs have never won against Sweden at the World Championships. They won their first draw in the group stage at the 2022 championships, but lost to Sweden in the final. With their second silver, the Czechs overtook Switzerland's third place in the medal standings.

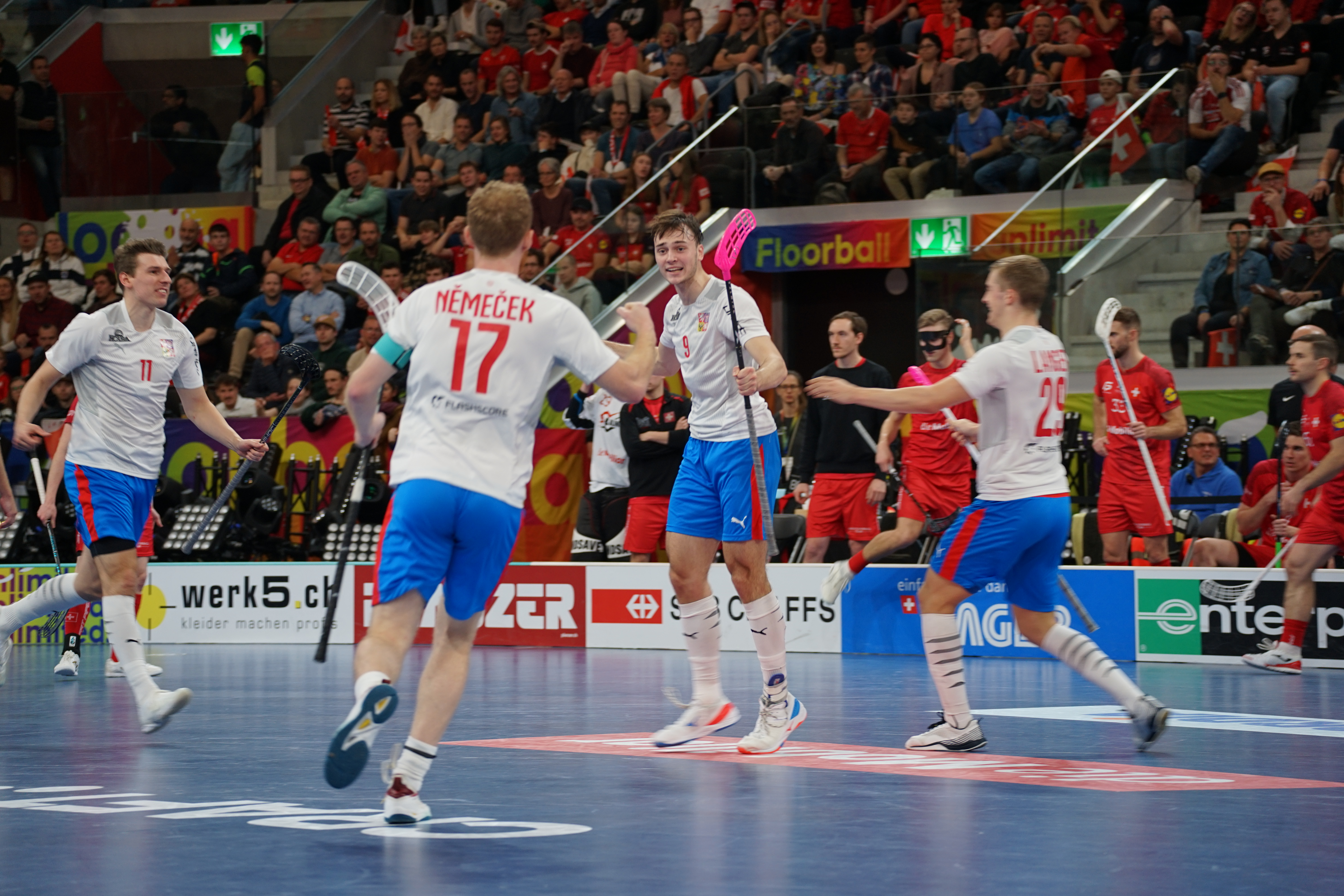
Players of the Czech national team celebrate a goal in the semifinal at the 2022 World Championship

== World Championship ==
Year	Hosting Country	Rank	Final match
1996	Sweden	4th place	Norway 2–6
1998	Czech Republic	6th place	Norway 4–5
2000	Norway	6th place	Norway 2–5
2002	Finland	4th place	Switzerland 3–4pp
2004	Switzerland	2nd place	Sweden 4–6
2006	Sweden	4th place	Switzerland 4–9
2008	Czech Republic	4th place	Switzerland 4–5pp
2010	Finland	3rd place	Switzerland 9–3
2012	Switzerland	7th place	Finland 1–4
2014	Sweden	3rd place	Switzerland 4–3
2016	Latvia	4th place	Switzerland 5–8
2018	Czech Republic	4th place	Switzerland 2–4
2020	Finland	3rd place	Switzerland 4–3pp
2022	Switzerland	2nd place	Sweden 3–9
2024	Sweden	3rd place	Latvia 8–2

== World Games ==
Year	Hosting Country	Rank	Final match
2017	Poland	4th place	Finland 2–0
2022	USA	3rd place	Latvia 7–3
2025	China	3rd place	Switzerland 7–2

== European Championships ==
Year	Hosting Country	Rank	Final match
1994	Finland	6rd place	Russia 5–6
1995	Switzerland	5rd place	Denmark 3–2

== See also ==
- Czech Republic women's national floorball team
- Czech Republic men's national under-19 floorball team
- Czech Republic women's national under-19 floorball team
