= North American Floorball League =

Floorball league in North America

- Most recent season or competition: 2024 NAFL season
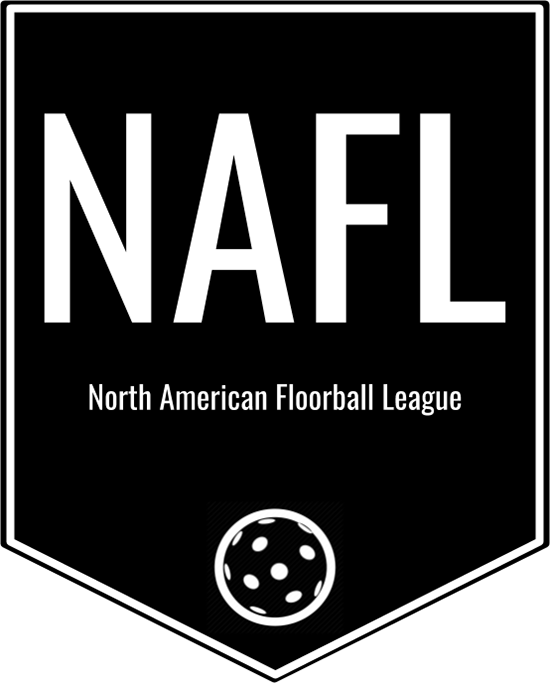
- Sport: Floorball
- Founded: 2020; 6 years ago
- First season: 2022
- Folded: 2024
- Commissioner: Ryan Connor
- No. of teams: 6
- Headquarters: Georgetown, Texas, U.S.
- Last champion: Fresno Force (1st title) (2024)
- Most titles: Florida Vikings (2 titles)

The North American Floorball League (NAFL) was a semi professional floorball league in North America, consisting of six teams across the United States. The league was founded in June 2020, and began play in the summer of 2022. The NAFL was the first elite level floorball league in North America, taking place in what is typically the offseason of most upper tier floorball leagues worldwide so as to draw the best possible talent without conflicting with club schedules. The league was last played in 2024.

== History ==
=== Creation of the league ===
Prior to the creation of the NAFL, elite floorball was greatly concentrated in Europe, and there was an absence of top-tier leagues to develop talent that was present in North America. The Canadian Floorball Federation has run the Floorball League of Canada since 2013, and the United States has operated a series of club tournaments such as the Golden Gate Cup and the Texas Open; however, there was no cohesive, highly promoted league to showcase the best talent that the two countries had to offer, or to attract international players who wanted to see the sport grow in North America.

Because the existing floorball seasons in North America and Europe took place during the fall and winter, an idea was devised to create a summer league that could increase the level of competition in North America for its best players without eliminating the structures already in place. The concept was for a league in which teams from across the United States and Canada could play full seasons while still minimizing travel and limiting budget, attracting fans to the sport and allowing the top floorball players in North America to be celebrated as elite athletes. The idea began to take fruition in June 2020, and the league was publicly announced on August 1, 2020, scheduled to begin play the next summer. However, the inaugural season was postponed to the summer of 2022 due to ongoing border closures as a result of the COVID-19 pandemic.

=== Team creation ===
The first team to be formed was the Fort Worth Jaguars, who were publicly announced on August 17, 2020. They were followed a month later by the Cleveland Bucs, who were announced on September 21, the Texas Tornadoes, who were announced on October 19, and finally the Fresno Force, who were founded on December 16, 2020. Following the postponement of the originally scheduled 2021 season, it was announced on December 8, 2021 that the Florida Vikings would be joining the league as a fifth team for the 2022 inaugural season, and the Utah Raptors were announced as a replacement for the Cleveland Bucs on January 15, 2022. The Texas Tornadoes suspended operations on May 16, 2022, bringing the total team count for the inaugural season back to four.

=== Inaugural season ===
The inaugural season included a bye week to account for the World Games being held in Birmingham, AL. At the conclusion of the regular season, the top seed Florida Vikings defeated the second seed Fort Worth Jaguars in the finals, becoming the first ever Troy Cup champions. The Fresno Force took third place after a playoff victory over the Utah Raptors. Josef Juha of the Vikings was voted league MVP after leading the league in goals and tying for the league lead in points, while the league leader in assists and co-leader in points, Rasmus Pasanen of the Jaguars, finished second. Third place in MVP voting went to Matt Smith of the Fresno Force.

== League structure and rules ==
The NAFL consists of six teams who play each other team twice in the regular season, followed by a two-round playoff for the top four teams. To reduce travel, individual teams will host every team in a single city, with each team playing games in that city before traveling to another host city as a league.

The league plays with IFF rules, but because of its positioning during what is traditionally the offseason, the NAFL can attract some of the top talent worldwide while allowing players to continue playing with their home clubs in the winter.

Games are played in three 20 minute periods, with an intermission between each, and should the game end in a tie, there is a 5-minute, sudden death overtime period, followed by a shootout. Teams are seeded in the playoffs based on the points they earn during the season. Three points are awarded for a win in regulation, two points for a win in overtime, one for a loss in overtime, and no points are given for a regulation loss. The only deviation from the IFF rulebook is that penalty shots and shootouts are played with a 15-second shot clock in the NAFL, whereas IFF rules allow an unlimited amount of time to shoot, as long as either the ball or shooter are continually moving forward.

== Teams ==
=== Current teams ===
NAFL Team Locations

Team	City	First season	Head Coach	Captain
Aviators of Ohio	Columbus, OH	2023	(Sweden) Andreas Blixt	(Sweden) Zacharias Melin
Fort Worth Jaguars	North Richland Hills, TX	2022	(Finland) Pekka Palomäki	(Sweden) Alexander Spinord
Fresno Force	Fresno, CA	2022	(Sweden) Bruno Lundberg	(Sweden) Kim Nyberg
Minnesota Growlers	Duluth, MN	2023	(Finland) Jussi Sihvonen	(Finland) Jukkapekka Auroila
Seattle Sockeyes	Seattle, WA	2024	(Finland) Tuomas Korhonen	(Finland) Kasper Tähkä
Texas 39ers	Georgetown, TX	2023	(Sweden) Peter Lindgren	(Sweden) William Jönsson

=== Former teams ===
Team	City/Area	Season(s)
Florida Vikings	Orlando, FL	2022-2023
Utah Raptors	Salt Lake City, UT	2022

== Championships ==
Season	Date	Champion	Final score	Runner-up	Venue	Location	Ref
2022	July 24, 2022	Florida Vikings	11–3	Fort Worth Jaguars	NYTEX Sports Centre	North Richland Hills, TX	
2023	July 30, 2023	Florida Vikings	9–2	Fresno Force	NYTEX Sports Centre	North Richland Hills, TX	
2024	July 28, 2024	Fresno Force	7–6	Texas 39ers	DECC Arena	Duluth, MN	

== MVP ==
Season	Name	Team	Ref
2022	(Czech Republic) Josef Juha	Florida Vikings	
2023	(Sweden) Linus Malmström	Florida Vikings	
2024	(Sweden) Billy Nilsson	Fresno Force	
