= Sweden men's national floorball team =

Sweden Men's National Floorball Team
- Founded: 1985
- Manager: (Sweden) Mika Packalén
- Coach: (Sweden) Niklas Nordén and Thomas Brottman
- IFF Ranking: 1st (2024)
- First game: 13–1, vs. Finland (28 September 1985)
- Largest win: 44–0, vs. Liechtenstein (5 February 2026)
- All-time top scorer: Kim Nilsson (210 points, 127 and 83 assists goals)
- Championships: 9 World Championships (1996, 1998, 2000, 2002, 2004, 2006, 2012, 2014, 2020, 2022); 3 World Games (2017, 2022, 2025); 1 European Championships (1994)

The Sweden men's national floorball team is the national floorball team of Sweden, and a member of the International Floorball Federation.

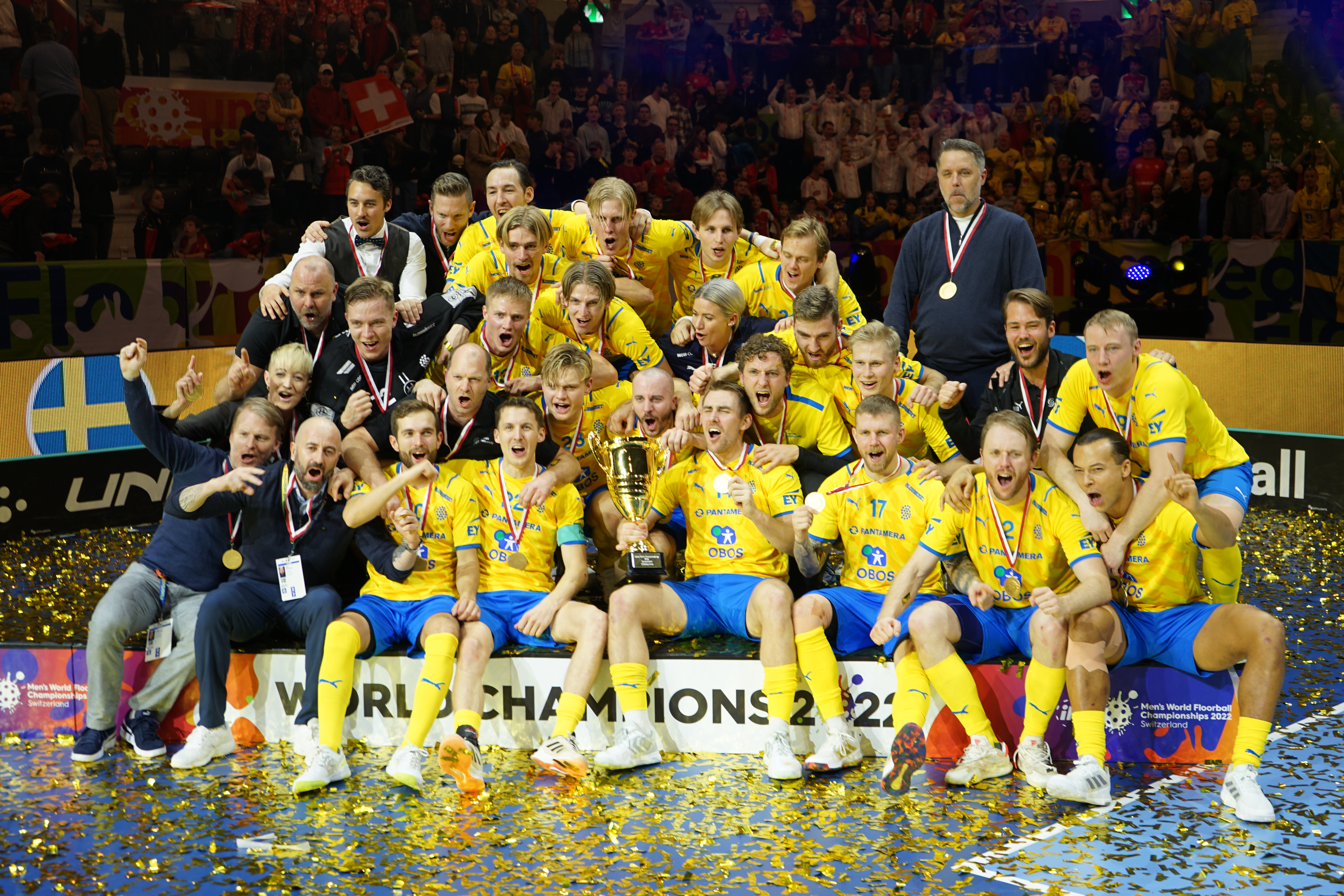
Swedish team celebrating victory at 2022 World Championships

The team won the gold medal at the European Championships in 1994 and ten out of 15 men's world championships (1996, 1998, 2000, 2002, 2004, 2006, 2012, 2014, 2020 and 2022). They have won silver at every other championship and are the only team that has always played in the final match and are the most successful floorball team overall. Together with Finland, they are the only teams to have ever won a gold medal at the World Championship and also to have won a medal at every European and World Championship as well as at all floorball tournaments at the World Games.

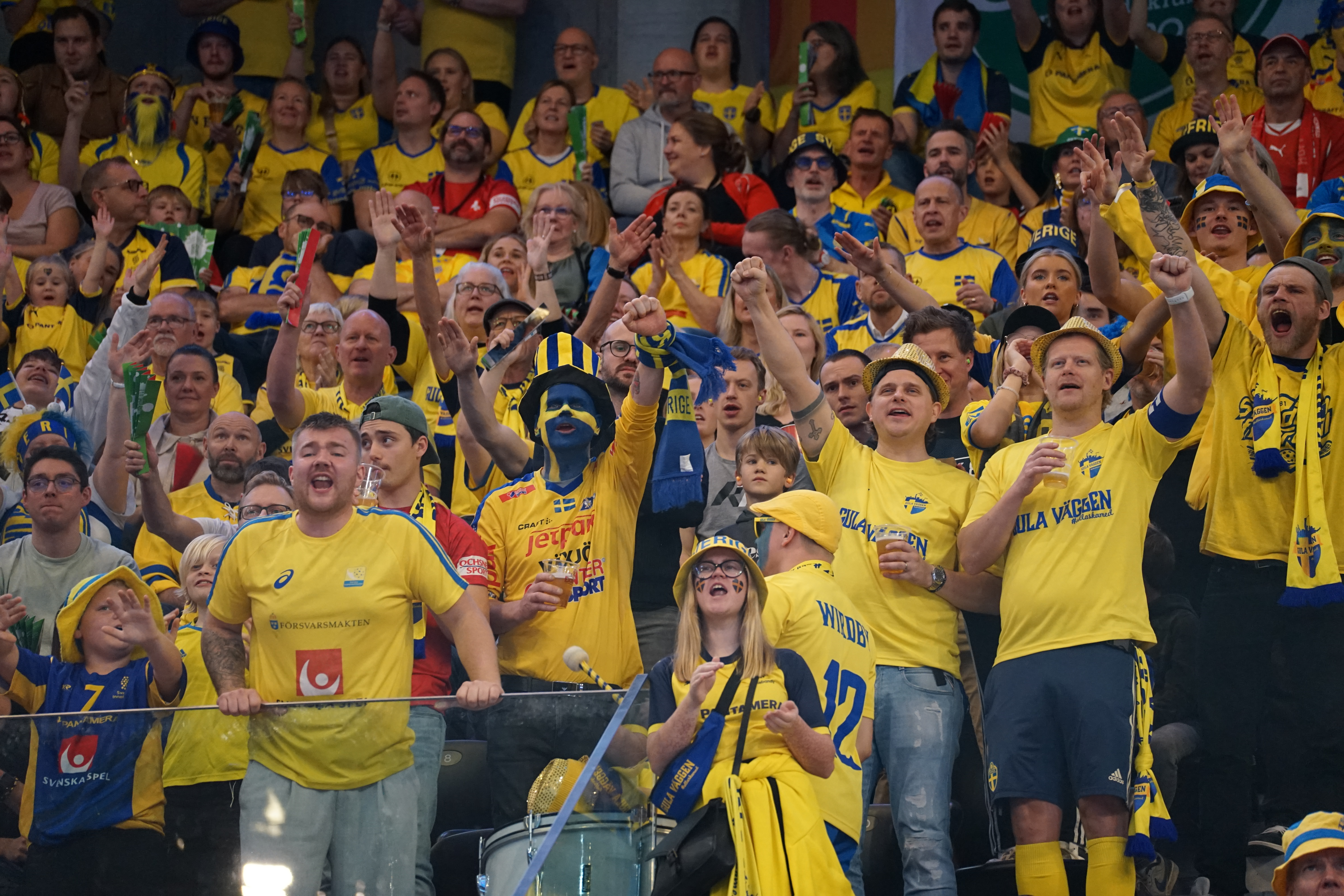
Fans of Sweden national floorball team at 2018 World Championships

The Swedes recorded their first draw at a World Championship as late as 2006, in a match against Switzerland, and needed sudden victory to defeat Finland in the final. In 2008, Finland defeated Sweden in overtime in final, giving Sweden its first loss in the World Floorball Championships, and causing it not to retain their 12-year title as world floorball champions. Sweden's dominance has decreased somewhat further, as they have won only half of the most recent ten championships. The last loss in 2024 was their first in a home tournament. In the IFF ranking, Sweden is first (ahead of Finland), following a second and first place in the last two championships in 2024 and 2022.

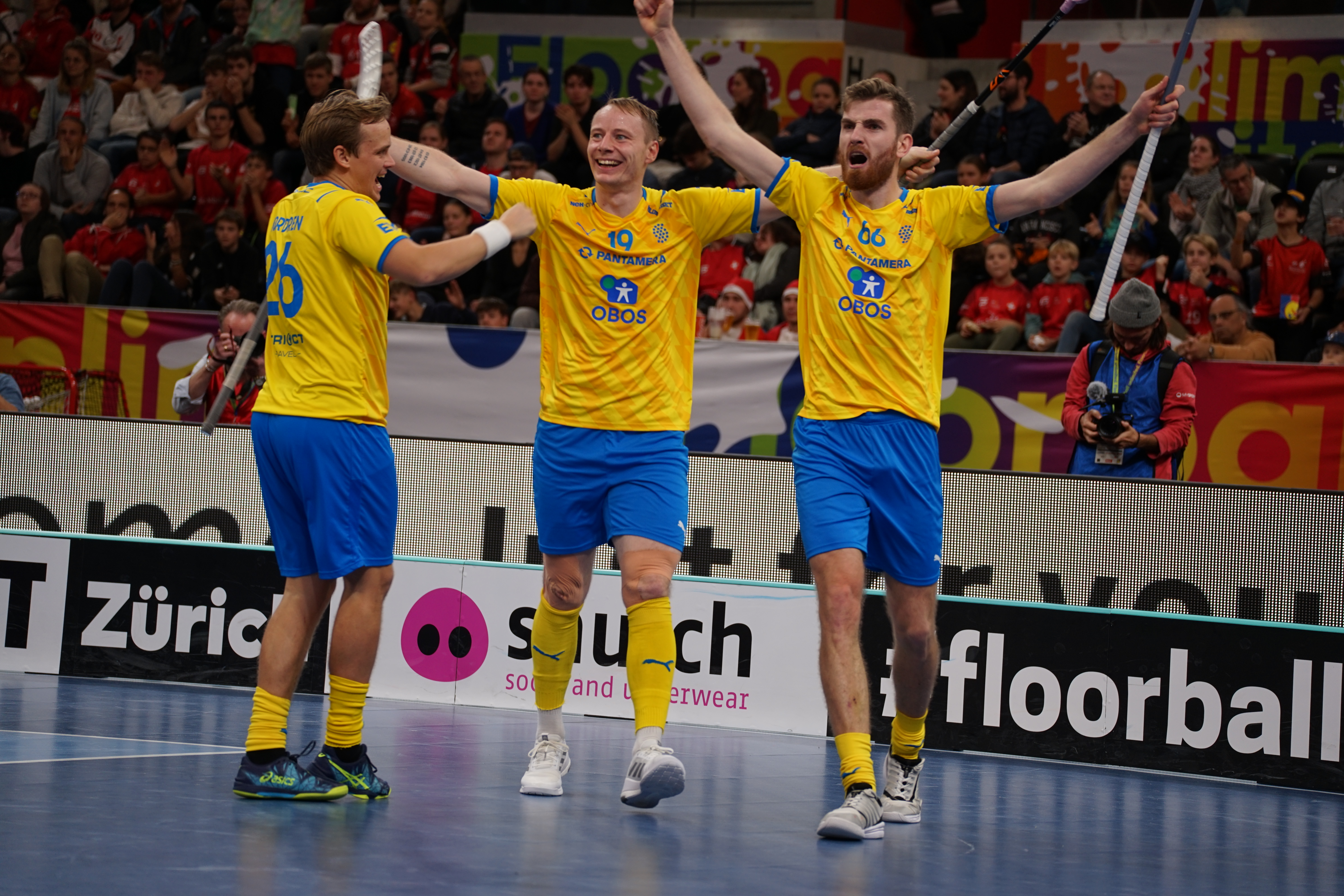
Swedish players celebrate a goal in final match against Czechia at 2022 World Championships

== World Championship ==
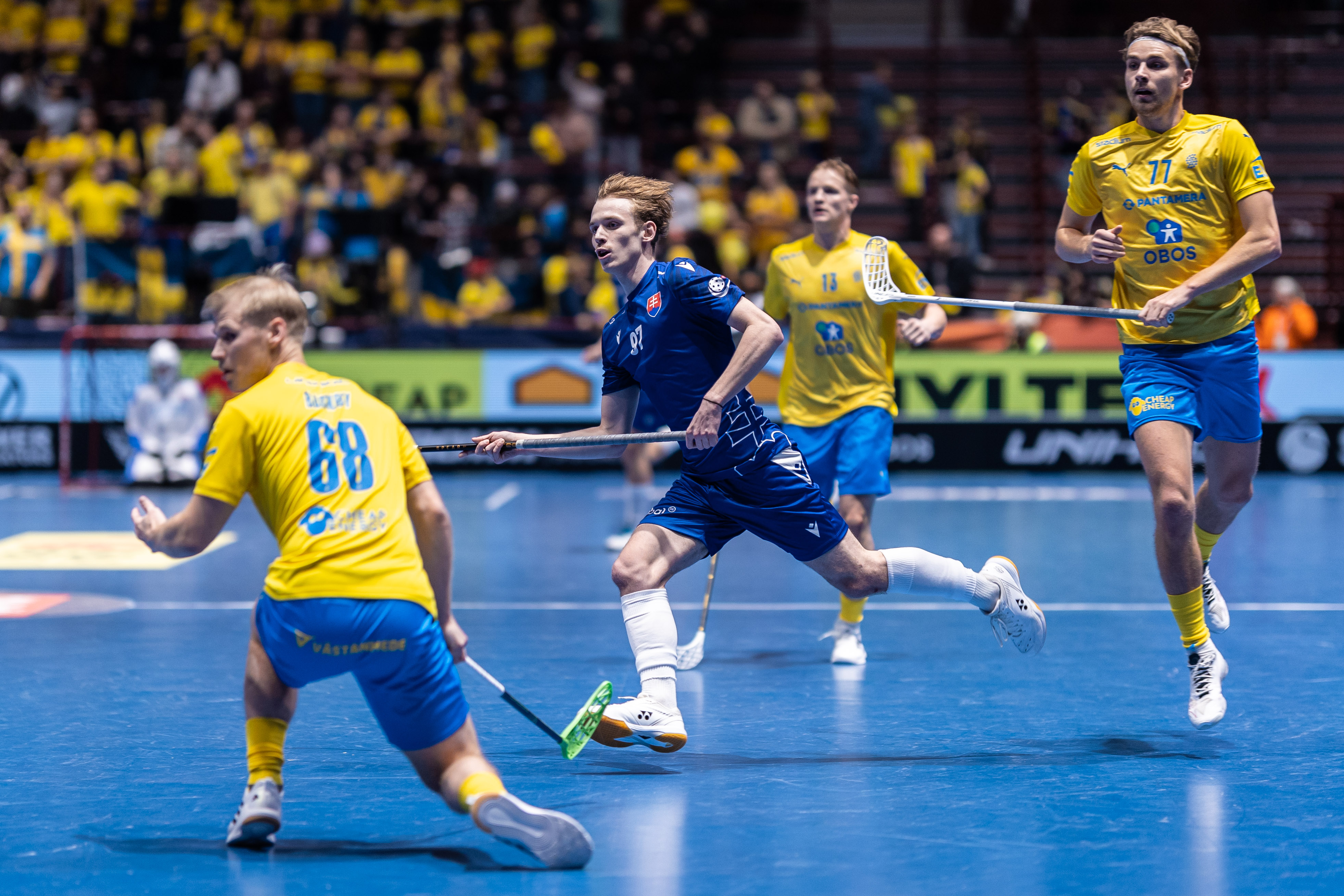
Swedish players in a match against Slovakia at the 2024 World Championship

Year	Hosting Country	Rank	Final match
1996	Sweden	1st place	Finland 5–0
1998	Czech Republic	1st place	Switzerland 10–3
2000	Norway	1st place	Finland 5–3
2002	Finland	1st place	Finland 6–4
2004	Switzerland	1st place	Czech Republic 6–4
2006	Sweden	1st place	Finland 7–6 OT
2008	Czech Republic	2nd place	Finland 6–7 OT
2010	Finland	2nd place	Finland 2–6
2012	Switzerland	1st place	Finland 11–5
2014	Sweden	1st place	Finland 3–2
2016	Latvia	2nd place	Finland 3–4 PS
2018	Czech Republic	2nd place	Finland 3–6
2020	Finland	1st place	Finland 6–4
2022	Switzerland	1st place	Czech Republic 9–3
2024	Sweden	2nd place	Finland 4–5 OT
2026	Finland		

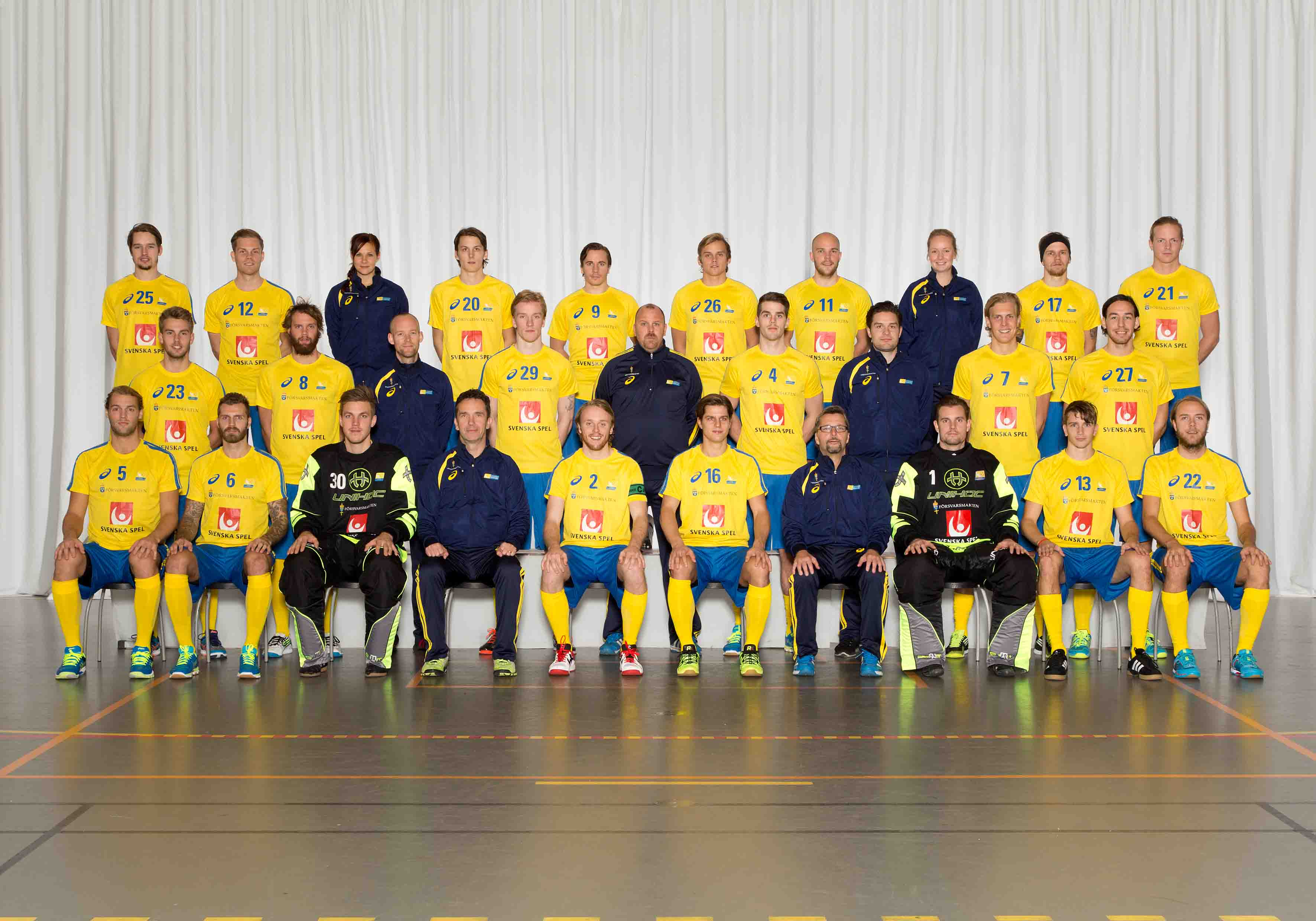
Sweden men's national floorball team (2014)

== World Games ==
Year	Hosting Country	Rank	Final match
2017	Poland	1st place	Switzerland 7–5
2022	USA	1st place	Finland 6–5
2025	China	1st place	Finland 2–1

== European Championships ==
Year	Hosting Country	Rank	Final match
1994	Finland	1st place	Finland 4–1
1995	Switzerland	2nd place	Finland 2–3 PS

== Rankings and records ==
=== All-time World Championship records ===
Year	GP	W	D	L	GF	GA	+/-
(Sweden) 1996	7	7	0	0	83	3	+80
(Czech Republic) 1998	5	5	0	0	56	5	+51
(Norway) 2000	5	5	0	0	31	10	+21
(Finland) 2002	6	6	0	0	75	8	+67
(Switzerland) 2004	6	6	0	0	76	13	+63
(Sweden) 2006	6	5	1	0	58	16	+42
(Czech Republic) 2008	6	5	0	1	62	18	+44
(Finland) 2010	6	5	0	1	96	12	+84
(Switzerland) 2012	6	6	0	0	96	12	+84
(Sweden) 2014	6	6	0	0	59	10	+49
(Latvia) 2016	6	5	0	1	44	14	+30
(Czech Republic) 2018	6	5	0	1	61	16	+45
(Finland) 2020	6	5	0	1	49	16	+33
(Switzerland) 2022	6	5	1	0	64	17	+47
(Sweden) 2024	6	4	0	2	42	18	+24
(Finland) 2026							
Totals	89	80	2	7	952	188	+764

== Current roster ==
As of February 2, 2023

#	Player	Club	Pos.	Grip	Age	Birthplace
1	Jon Hedlund	(Sweden) Pixbo Wallenstam IBK	G	R	34	Sweden
2	Johan Samuelsson	(Sweden) IBF Falun	F	L	37	Sweden
7	Kim Nilsson	(Sweden) FBC Kalmarsund	F	L	37	Sweden
8	Malte Lundmark	(Sweden) IBF Falun	F	R	24	Sweden
9	Alexander Galante Carlstrom	(Sweden) IBF Falun	F	R	37	Sweden
10	Albin Sjögren	(Sweden) Strovreta IBK	F	R	31	Sweden
13	Ludwig Persson	(Sweden) Växjö IBK	D	L	31	Sweden
14	Tobias Gustafsson	(Sweden) Storvreta IBK	D	L	33	Sweden
17	Rasmus Enström	(Sweden) IBF Falun	D	R	36	Sweden
19	Jesper Sankell	(Sweden) Växjö IBK	F	R	32	Sweden
21	Linus Holmgren	(Sweden) IBF Falun	F	L	28	Sweden
22	Emil Johansson	(Sweden) IBF Falun	D	L	33	Sweden
23	Hampus Ahrén	(Sweden) Nykvarns IBF Ungdom	F	L	25	Sweden
26	Linus Nordgren	(Sweden) FC Helsingborg	F	L	36	Sweden
28	Niklas Ramirez	(Sweden) Växjö IBK (United States) Florida Vikings	F	L	30	Sweden
66	Kevin Haglund	(Sweden) FBC Kalmarsund (United States) Florida Vikings	F	L	27	Sweden
68	Casper Backby	(Sweden) IBF Falun	F	L	28	Sweden
72	Carl Bending Sorling	(Sweden) FBC Kalmarsund	G	R	31	Sweden
77	Linus Malmström	(Sweden) FC Helsingborg (United States) Florida Vikings	F	R	26	Sweden
97	Robin Nilsberth	(Switzerland) Zug United	F	R	36	Sweden
