= 2024 Men's World Floorball Championships qualification =

Floorball competition

The 2024 IFF Men's World Floorball Championships qualification is a series of tournaments to decide the teams which will play in the 2024 Men's World Floorball Championships. The 2024 World Championship will once again feature 16 teams. 1 place were allocated to the hosts, Sweden. The remaining 15 places will be determined by a qualification process, in which entrants from among the other teams from the five IFF confederations will compete.

== Distribution of spots ==
The distribution by confederation for the 2024 Men's World Floorball Championships will be:

- Host: 1
- Asia and Oceania: 3 places
- Americas: 1
- Europe: 11 (Sweden qualified automatically as host nations for a total of 12 places)

== Qualified teams ==
Team	Qualified as	Qualification date	Appearance			Previous best performance
Team	Qualified as	Qualification date	Last	Total	Streak	Previous best performance
Sweden	Hosts	23 February 2021	2022	15	15	Champions (1996, 1998, 2000, 2002, 2004, 2006, 2012, 2014, 2020 and 2022)
Canada	Americas qualification	18 February 2024	2022	8	8	11th place (2010, 2018)
Philippines	Asia-Oceania qualification	24 May 2024	2022	3	3	14th place (2020)
Thailand	Asia-Oceania qualification	24 May 2024	2022	4	4	13th place (2020)
Australia	Asia-Oceania qualification	25 May 2024	2022	6	2	12th place (2018)

== Americas qualification ==
The American qualification were played between 17 and 18 February 2024 in Toronto, Canada at the Toronto Metropolitan University. Colombia wanted to enter for the first time, but International Floorball Federation rejected the Colombian entry due to financial reasons. Canada won both games with a 26–7 aggregate score. This result also qualified Canada to the 2025 World Games in Chengdu.

=== Teams ===
- Canada (12)
- United States (17)

=== Group ===
Pos	Team	Pld	W	D	L	GF	GA	GD	Pts	Qualification
1	Canada (H)	2	2	0	0	26	7	+19	4	2024 World Championships
2	United States	2	0	0	2	7	26	−19	0	

Source: IFF
(H) Hosts

17 February 2024; 12:45	United States	2–11 (1–6, 1–2, 0–3)	Canada	Toronto Metropolitan University, Toronto

Report

18 February 2024; 14:00	Canada	15–5 (5–3, 4–2, 6–0)	United States	Toronto Metropolitan University, Toronto

Report

== Asia-Oceania qualification ==
The Asia-Oceania qualification will be played between 21 and 25 May 2024 in Pasig, Philippines. The event was originally going to be held in February 2024, but was postponed to May due to the delay of the 2021 Asian Indoor and Martial Arts Games to February. The top three will make the 2024 Men's World Floorball Championships. Since China entered the event, they will take the host quota at the 2025 World Games in Chengdu. On, 26 April 2024, the team lists were announced.

=== Group composition ===
Group A	Group B
Australia (13); Singapore (16); Japan (21); China (36)	Thailand (14); Philippines (15) **(H)**; New Zealand (22); South Korea (25)

Notes

- Teams in **bold** qualified for the final tournament.
- (H): Qualification group hosts

=== Group A ===
Pos	Team	Pld	W	D	L	GF	GA	GD	Pts	Qualification
1	Australia	3	3	0	0	32	7	+25	**6**	Semifinals
2	Singapore	3	1	1	1	27	13	+14	**3**	Semifinals
3	Japan	3	1	1	1	22	17	+5	**3**	Fifth place game
4	China	3	0	0	3	6	50	−44	**0**	Seventh place game

Source: IFF

21 May 2024; 10:00	China	**1–17** (1–5, 0–6, 0–6)	**Australia**	PhilSports Arena, Pasig City; Attendance: 98

Report

Referees:
Sharil Ismail (Singapore)
Oswind Rosayro (Singapore)

	0–1	Liam Perry 02:52
	0–2	Tomas Gartner 05:00
Zhiheng Zhang 07:24	1–2
	1–3	Liam Perry 07:46
	1–4	Tomas Gartner 15:45
	1–5	David Noney 15:56
	1–6	Christian Newland 20:16 (PP)
	1–7	Jonathan Salt 24:59
	1–8	Daniel Gartner 30:25
	1–9	Christian Newland 33:46
	1–10	Christian Newland 36:06
	1–11	Jordan Noel 39:24
	1–12	Daniel Gartner 40:43
	1–13	Christian Newland 45:03
	1–14	Kent Feurstein 45:39
	1–15	Tobias Knox Lyttle 47:42
	1–16	Tomas Gartner 48:09
	1–17	Ben Kosterich 51:43

21 May 2024; 13:00	Japan	**5–5** (1–0, 1–2, 3–3)	Singapore	PhilSports Arena, Pasig City; Attendance: 153

Report

Referees:
Jaey Jetpuria (Malaysia)
Calvin Lim (Malaysia)

Satoru Shimoyama 19:07	1–0
	1–1	Mikhail Raiyan Abd Aziz 27:23
	1–2	Fattah Barin 28:11
Naoki Shiba 35:50	2–2
	2–3	Gerald Tan 40:32
	2–4	Suria R 44:41
Hiroto Moriya 46:35	3–4
Hiroto Moriya 52:57 (PP)	4–4
	4–5	Muhammad Irwan Shaiful 54:05
Hiroto Moriya 54:51	5–5

22 May 2024; 10:00	**Japan**	**14–5** (2–3, 6–0, 6–2)	China	PhilSports Arena, Pasig City; Attendance: 122

Report

Referees:
Omar Edar (Malaysia)
Nuraidi Anuar (Malaysia)

Satoru Shimoyama 03:45	1–0
	1–1	Yulin Zhang 08:33
	1–2	Biao Hu 15:45 (SH)
	1–3	Peng Tao 15:50 (SH)
Kai Yui 18:48 (PP)	2–3
Daiya Wakasa 24:14	3–3
Hiroto Moriya 32:13	4–3
Yuichi Yanagita 34:08	5–3
Shin Kato 34:49	6–3
Satoru Shimoyama 35:11	7–3
Yosuke Saito 37:28	8–3
Yosuke Saito 42:03	9–3
Daiya Wakasa 47:26 (PP)	10–3
Daiya Wakasa 48:45	11–3
Hiroto Moriya 53:29	12–3
Shin Nakamura 55:18	13–3
Tsubasa Takahashi 55:40	14–3
	14–4	Peng Tao 56:46
	14–5	Peng Tao 58:58

22 May 2024; 13:00	Singapore	**3–8** (1–3, 1–4, 1–1)	**Australia**	PhilSports Arena, Pasig City; Attendance: 115

Report

Referees:
Fajar Hidayat (Indonesia)
Yongky Priyanto(Indonesia)

Mikhail Raiyan Abd Aziz 03:03	1–0
	1–1	Jordan Noel 03:24
	1–2	Ben Hemmi 08:54
	1–3	Ben Kosterich 12:48
	1–4	Daniel Gartner 21:05
	1–5	Tomas Gartner 27:31
Mikhail Raiyan Abd Aziz 30:28	2–5
	2–6	Tomas Gartner 36:05
	2–7	David Noney 36:22
Fattah Barin 55:12	3–7
	3–8	Tomas Gartner 55:57

23 May 2024; 10:00	**Singapore**	**19–0** (7–0, 4–0, 8–0)	China	PhilSports Arena, Pasig City; Attendance: 112

Report

Referees:
Jaey Jetpuria (Malaysia)
Calvin Lim (Malaysia)

Mikhail Raiyan Abd Aziz 04:38	1–0
Azhari Saputra Mustafa 05:15	2–0
Keanen Poon 06:43	3–0
Muhammad Irwan Shaiful 08:10	4–0
Mikhail Raiyan Abd Aziz 13:17 (SH)	5–0
Muhammad Irwan Shaiful 14:24 (SH)	6–0
Mikhail Raiyan Abd Aziz 18:20	7–0
Suria R 23:05	8–0
Muhammad Irwan Shaiful 27:34	9–0
Fattah Barin 29:28	10–0
Fattah Barin 32:25 (PP)	11–0
Tze Wen Thaddeus Tan 42:02	12–0
Muhammad Irwan Shaiful 43:51	13–0
Navin Kumaran 46:15	14–0
Fattah Barin 46:18	15–0
Sathish R 50:32	16–0
Muhammad Irwan Shaiful 51:30	17–0
Mikhail Raiyan Abd Aziz 54:57	18–0
Sathish R 55:08	19–0

23 May 2024; 13:00	**Australia**	**7–3** (1–0, 3–2, 3–1)	Japan	PhilSports Arena, Pasig City; Attendance: 248

Report

Referees:
Fajar Hidayat (Indonesia)
Yongky Priyanto(Indonesia)

Daniel Gartner 13:57	1–0
Tomas Gartner 20:30	2–0
	2–1	Hiroto Moriya 22:40
Dylan Clutterbuck 26:01	3–1
	3–2	Yuichi Yanagita 29:08 (PP)
Liam Perry 36:48	4–2
Ben Hemmi 41:23	5–2
Daniel Gartner 48:07 (PP)	6–2
Jesse Justice 48:36	7–2
	7–3	Yosuke Saito 51:04

=== Group B ===
Pos	Team	Pld	W	D	L	GF	GA	GD	Pts	Qualification
1	Thailand	3	3	0	0	32	7	+25	**6**	Semifinals
2	Philippines (H)	3	2	0	1	19	14	+5	**4**	Semifinals
3	South Korea	3	1	0	2	11	33	−22	**2**	Fifth place game
4	New Zealand	3	0	0	3	8	16	−8	**0**	Seventh place game

Source: IFF
(H) Hosts

21 May 2024; 16:00	New Zealand	**2–4** (0–2, 1–0, 1–2)	**Philippines**	PhilSports Arena, Pasig City; Attendance: 448

Report

Referees:
Omar Edar (Malaysia)
Nuraidi Anuar (Malaysia)

	0–1	Lucas Oijvall Perez 01:36
	0–2	Melvin Alm Mendoza 12:04 (PS)
Pavol Nekl 29:57	1–2
	1–3	Lucas Werelius 41:55
	1–4	Melvin Alm Mendoza 52:27
Coby Crafar 59:27	2–4

21 May 2024; 19:00	**Thailand**	**18–1** (4–0, 6–0, 8–1)	South Korea	PhilSports Arena, Pasig City; Attendance: 91

Report

Referees:
Yongky Priyanto (Indonesia)
Fajar Hidayat (Indonesia)

Pawat Thaidit 06:33	1–0
Jeerayut Yaemyim 08:17	2–0
Pawat Thaidit 12:15 (PP)	3–0
Prakasit Namsawang 19:45	4–0
Lukas Hubinette Phraiwan 23:18	5–0
Simon Johansson 24:47	6–0
Prakasit Namsawang 29:15	7–0
Franz Nattapat Kerdsawangwong 31:15	8–0
Pawat Thaidit 31:39	9–0
Franz Nattapat Kerdsawangwong 39:44	10–0
Simon Johansson 43:02	11–0
Surapong Sangmongkhol 44:39	12–0
Anucha Wong-art 49:35	13–0
	13–1	Tae Woo Yoo 49:37
Chusak Narkprasert 50:22	14–1
Pheeraphong Khambanlue 51:43	15–1
Simon Johansson 52:44	16–1
Alexander Rinefalk 57:59	17–1
Anucha Wong-art 59:14	18–1

22 May 2024; 16:00	South Korea	**4–12** (–, –, –)	**Philippines**	PhilSports Arena, Pasig City

Report

22 May 2024; 19:00	**Thailand**	**6–3** (–, –, –)	New Zealand	PhilSports Arena, Pasig City

Report

23 May 2024; 16:00	Philippines	**3–8** (–, –, –)	**Thailand**	PhilSports Arena, Pasig City

Report

23 May 2024; 19:00	**South Korea**	**6–3** (–, –, –)	New Zealand	PhilSports Arena, Pasig City

Report

=== Final round ===
All times are local (UTC+7).

==== Seventh place game ====
24 May 2024; 13:00	**New Zealand**	**9–3** (3–1, 4–1, 2–1)	China	PhilSports Arena, Pasig City; Attendance: 112

Report

Referees:
Jaey Jetpuria (Malaysia)
Calvin Lim (Malaysia)

Archie Cosslett 05:28	1–0
Matthew Bertschinger 06:55	2–0
	2–1	Menglin Wei 13:18
Ken Takizawa 17:49	3–1
Harison Clulow 20:13	4–1
	4–2	Biao Hu 23:57
Timothy McKibbin 26:53	5–2
Timothy McKibbin 29:16	6–2
Angus Stallmann 32:17	7–2
James Matheson 43:15	8–2
Timothy McKibbin 55:35	9–2
	9–3	Zhiheng Zhang 58:23

==== Fifth place game ====
25 May 2024; 9:00	**Japan**	**5–4 OT** (1–2, 1–2, 2–0); 1–0 OT	South Korea	PhilSports Arena, Pasig City; Attendance: 107

Report

Referees:
Jaey Jetpuria (Malaysia)
Calvin Lim (Malaysia)

	0–1	Jun Young Lee 04:14
	0–2	Tae Won Seok 12:49 (PP)
Kenta Ramsauer 14:21	1–2
	1–3	Jun Young Lee 21:11 (PP)
	1–4	Eu Sung Lee 21:56 (PP)
Gai Tagami 29:26	2–4
Shin Nakamura 42:12	3–4
Shin Kato 59:56 (PPEN)	4–4
Shin Nakamura 69:27 (ET)	5–4

=== Knockout stage ===
Semifinals
24 May
Australia	3
**Philippines**	**5**
24 May
**Thailand**	**10**
Singapore	1

Final
25 May
**Philippines**	**6**
Thailand	5
Third place
25 May
**Australia**	**4**
Singapore	3

==== Semifinals ====
24 May 2024; 16:00	Australia	**3–5** (1–2, 2–2, 0–1)	**Philippines**	PhilSports Arena, Pasig City; Attendance: 617

Report

Referees:
Sharil Ismail (Singapore)
Oswind Rosayro (Singapore)

Daniel Gartner 06:24	1–0
	1–1	Melvin Alm Mendoza 16:34
	1–2	Lucas Werelius 18:35
	1–3	Ludvig Hemmingberg Porral 25:26
Liam Perry 29:25	2–3
	2–4	Lucas Werelius 31:48
Christian Newland 34:17	3–4
	3–5	Melvin Alm Mendoza 59:41

24 May 2024; 19:00	**Thailand**	**10–1** (2–1, 5–0, 3–0)	Singapore	PhilSports Arena, Pasig City; Attendance: 217

Report

Referees:
Fajar Hidayat (Indonesia)
Yongky Priyanto (Indonesia)

Alexander Rinefalk 10:31	1–0
	1–1	Muhammad Irwan Shaiful 13:30
Veerasak Pimpa 16:20	2–1
Pheeraphong Khambanlue 24:28	3–1
Simon Johansson 29:16	4–1
Simon Johansson 34:12	5–1
Jeerayut Yaemyim 36:23	6–1
Simon Johansson 37:55	7–1
Franz Nattapat Kerdsawangwong 44:29	8–1
Simon Johansson 47:26	9–1
Pheeraphong Khambanlue 57:31 (EN)	10–1

==== Third place game ====
25 May 2024; 12:00	**Australia**	**4–3** (1–0, 3–2, 0–1)	Singapore	PhilSports Arena, Pasig City; Attendance: 277

Report

Referees:
Fajar Hidayat (Indonesia)
Yongky Priyanto (Indonesia)

Jonathan Salt 12:21	1–0
	1–1	Mikhail Raiyan Abd Aziz 20:16
	1–2	Jun Wei Foo 24:16
Liam Perry 27:26 (SH)	2–2
Ben Kosterich 33:02	3–2
Jordan Noel 33:06	4–2
	4–3	Fattah Barin 51:53

==== Final ====
25 May 2024; 15:00	**Philippines**	**6–5** (2–2, 1–1, 3–2)	Thailand	PhilSports Arena, Pasig City; Attendance: 862

Report

Referees:
Sharil Ismail (Singapore)
Oswind Rosayro (Singapore)

Simon Sicat Larano 09:49	1–0
	1–1	Simon Johansson 10:37
	1–2	Pawat Thaidit 13:53 (PP)
Lucas Werelius 19:26 (PP)	2–2
	2–3	Santipong Sukkasem 34:02
Simon Sicat Larano 37:48	3–3
	3–4	Lukas Hubinette Phraiwan 42:58
Kim Varga Franz 43:32	4–4
Melvin Alm Mendoza 48:43	5–4
	5–5	Lukas Hubinette Phraiwan 51:01
Lucas Werelius 53:40	6–5

=== Final ranking ===
Rank	Team
1	Philippines
2	Thailand
3	Australia
4	Singapore
5	Japan
6	South Korea
7	New Zealand
8	China

Qualified for the 2024 Men's World Floorball Championships

== European qualification ==
=== Format ===
The first two qualification tournaments were eight team competitions, held in Liepāja and Łochów. Both qualification tournaments have four available spots in the world championship. The third tournament was a round-robin group consisting of five teams organised in Škofja Loka. The top three in this group qualify for the world championship. The qualification schedule was announced on 5 July 2023. The squads were confirmed on 4 January 2024.

=== European qualification tournament 1 ===
The European qualification tournament 1 were played between 31 January and 3 February 2024 in Liepāja, Latvia.

Group seeding
Group A	Group B
Finland (3); Estonia (9); France (23); Netherlands (27)	Latvia (5) (H); Germany (8); Iceland (20); Liechtenstein (29)

Pos	Team	Pld	W	D	L	GF	GA	GD	Pts	Qualification
1	Finland	3	3	0	0	65	2	+63	6	Final and 2024 World Championships
2	Estonia	3	2	0	1	32	26	+6	4	Qualification play off
3	France	3	1	0	2	12	48	−36	2	Qualification play off
4	Netherlands	3	0	0	3	9	42	−33	0	Seventh place game

Source: IFF

31 January 2024; 09:00	Netherlands	1–20 (1–8, 0–5, 0–7)	Finland	Olympic Centre

Report

31 January; 12:00	France	2–19 (0–3, 0–9, 2–7)	Estonia	Olympic Centre

Report

1 February 2024; 09:00	France	10–5 (4–4, 2–1, 4–0)	Netherlands	Olympic Centre

Report

1 February 2024; 15:00	Estonia	1–21 (0–5, 1–8, 0–8)	Finland	Olympic Centre

Report

2 February 2024; 09:00	Estonia	12–3 (6–0, 5–0, 1–3)	Netherlands	Olympic Centre

Report

2 February 2024; 15:00	Finland	24–0 (9–0, 6–0, 9–0)	France	Olympic Centre

Report

=== Group B ===
Pos	Team	Pld	W	D	L	GF	GA	GD	Pts	Qualification
1	Latvia (H)	3	3	0	0	60	5	+55	6	Final and 2024 World Championships
2	Germany	3	2	0	1	36	12	+24	4	Qualification play off
3	Iceland	3	1	0	2	9	43	−34	2	Qualification play off
4	Liechtenstein	3	0	0	3	10	55	−45	0	Seventh place game

Source: IFF
(H) Hosts

31 January 2024; 15:00	Germany	16–1 (3–0, 6–0, 7–1)	Iceland	Olympic Centre

Report

31 January 2024; 18:00	Liechtenstein	3–29 (0–8, 2–11, 1–10)	Latvia	Olympic Centre

Report

1 February 2024; 12:00	Iceland	7–6 (1–2, 3–2, 3–2)	Liechtenstein	Olympic Centre

Report

1 February 2024; 18:00	Latvia	10–1 (3–0, 4–1, 3–0)	Germany	Olympic Centre

Report

2 February 2024; 12:00	Germany	19–1 (2–1, 10–0, 7–0)	Liechtenstein	Olympic Centre

Report

2 February 2024; 18:00	Iceland	1–21 (0–9, 0–5, 1–7)	Latvia	Olympic Centre

Report

=== Seventh place game ===
Seventh place game
February 3
Netherlands	6
Liechtenstein	2

3 February 2024; 09:00	Netherlands	6–2 (1–0, 0–1, 5–1)	Liechtenstein	Olympic Centre

Report

=== Qualification play off ===
Qualification play off
February 3
Estonia	14
Iceland	2

3 February 2024; 12:00	Estonia	14–2 (5–0, 2–0, 7–2)	Iceland	Olympic Centre

Report

Estonia qualified for the 2024 World Championships

Qualification play off
February 3
Germany	12
France	0

3 February 2024; 15:00	Germany	12–0 (4–0, 5–0, 3–0)	France	Olympic Centre

Report

Germany qualified for the 2024 World Championships

=== Final ===
Final
February 3
Finland	11
Latvia	3

3 February 2024; 18:00	Finland	11–3 (1–0, 6–2, 4–1)	Latvia	Olympic Centre

Report

=== European qualification tournament 2 ===
The European qualification tournament 2 were played between 1 and 4 February 2024 in Łochów, Poland.

Group seeding
Group A	Group B
Slovakia (6); Norway (7); Spain (19); Great Britain (31)	Czech Republic (2); Poland (11) (H); Austria (24); Hungary (26)

Pos	Team	Pld	W	D	L	GF	GA	GD	Pts	Qualification
1	Slovakia	3	2	1	0	47	13	+34	5	Final and 2024 World Championships
2	Norway	3	2	1	0	41	13	+28	5	Qualification play off
3	Spain	3	1	0	2	11	36	−25	2	Qualification play off
4	Great Britain	3	0	0	3	14	51	−37	0	Seventh place game

Source: IFF

1 February 2024; 10:00	Great Britain	8–19 (2–5, 1–8, 5–6)	Slovakia	Łochów Arena

Report

1 February 2024; 13:00	Spain	5–10 (2–4, 2–5, 1–1)	Norway	Łochów Arena

Report

2 February 2024; 10:00	Spain	6–3 (2–2, 1–0, 3–1)	Great Britain	Łochów Arena

Report

2 February 2024; 16:00	Norway	5–5 (4–0, 0–3, 1–2)	Slovakia	Łochów Arena

Report

3 February 2024; 09:00	Norway	26–3 (13–0, 9–2, 4–1)	Great Britain	Łochów Arena

Report

3 February 2024; 12:00	Slovakia	23–0 (11–0, 8–0, 4–0)	Spain	Łochów Arena

Report

=== Group B ===
Pos	Team	Pld	W	D	L	GF	GA	GD	Pts	Qualification
1	Czech Republic	3	3	0	0	51	3	+48	6	Final and 2024 World Championships
2	Poland (H)	3	1	1	1	8	21	−13	3	Qualification play off
3	Hungary	3	1	0	2	7	22	−15	2	Qualification play off
4	Austria	3	0	1	2	12	32	−20	1	Seventh place game

Source: IFF
(H) Hosts

1 February 2024; 16:00	Czech Republic	16–1 (6–1, 5–0, 5–0)	Hungary	Łochów Arena

Report

1 February 2024; 19:00	Austria	6–6 (1–2, 4–3, 1–1)	Poland	Łochów Arena

Report

2 February 2024; 13:00	Czech Republic	20–2 (6–0, 7–1, 7–1)	Austria	Łochów Arena

Report

2 February 2024; 20:00	Hungary	0–2 (0–1, 0–0, 0–1)	Poland	Łochów Arena

Report

3 February 2024; 16:00	Hungary	6–4 (1–0, 0–2, 5–2)	Austria	Łochów Arena

Report

3 February 2024; 18:00	Poland	0–15 (0–6, 0–4, 0–5)	Czech Republic	Łochów Arena

Report

=== Seventh place game ===
Seventh place game
February 4
Great Britain	4
Austria	8

4 February 2024; 09:00	Great Britain	4–8 (3–1, 1–4, 0–3)	Austria	Łochów Arena

Report

=== Qualification play off ===
Qualification play off
February 4
Norway	16
Hungary	3

4 February 2024; 12:00	Norway	16–3 (6–0, 5–1, 5–2)	Hungary	Łochów Arena

Report

Norway qualified for the 2024 World Championships

Qualification play off
February 4
Poland	9
Spain	6

4 February 2024; 15:00	Poland	9–6 (2–1, 4–1, 3–3)	Spain	Łochów Arena

Report

Poland qualified for the 2024 World Championships

=== Final ===
Final
February 4
Slovakia	1
Czech Republic	10

4 February 2024; 18:00	Slovakia	1–10 (0–6, 1–2, 0–2)	Czech Republic	Łochów Arena

Report

=== European qualification tournament 3 ===
The European qualification tournament 3 were played between 31 January and 4 February 2024 in Škofja Loka, Slovenia.

Group seeding
Switzerland (4)
Denmark (10)
Slovenia (18) (H)
Belgium (30)
Italy (32)

Pos	Team	Pld	W	D	L	GF	GA	GD	Pts	Qualification
1	Switzerland	4	4	0	0	53	9	+44	8	2024 World Championships
2	Slovenia (H)	4	2	1	1	22	23	−1	5	2024 World Championships
3	Denmark	4	2	0	2	20	19	+1	4	2024 World Championships
4	Italy	4	1	0	3	13	34	−21	2	
5	Belgium	4	0	1	3	11	34	−23	1	

Source: IFF
(H) Hosts

31 January 2024; 17:00	Switzerland	16–2 (5–0, 8–1, 3–1)	Italy	Poden Sports Hall, Škofja Loka

Report

31 January 2024; 20:00	Denmark	2–3 (0–1, 1–1, 1–1)	Slovenia	Poden Sports Hall, Škofja Loka

Report

1 February 2024; 17:00	Belgium	2–13 (1–5, 0–6, 1–2)	Switzerland	Poden Sports Hall, Škofja Loka

Report

1 February 2024; 20:00	Italy	2–11 (1–4, 0–3, 1–4)	Slovenia	Poden Sports Hall, Škofja Loka

Report

1 February 2024; 17:00	Italy	5–2 (0–2, 3–0, 2–0)	Belgium	Poden Sports Hall, Škofja Loka

Report

2 February 2024; 20:00	Switzerland	11–3 (3–1, 6–2, 2–0)	Denmark	Poden Sports Hall, Škofja Loka

Report

3 February 2024; 15:00	Denmark	5–4 (2–2, 1–1, 2–1)	Italy	Poden Sports Hall, Škofja Loka

Report

3 February 2024; 18:00	Slovenia	6–6 (2–2, 3–2, 1–2)	Belgium	Poden Sports Hall, Škofja Loka

Report

4 February 2024; 11:00	Belgium	1–10 (0–3, 1–4, 0–3)	Denmark	Poden Sports Hall, Škofja Loka

Report

4 February 2024; 14:00	Slovenia	2–13 (1–3, 1–5, 0–5)	Switzerland	Poden Sports Hall, Škofja Loka

Report
