= 2016 Men's World Floorball Championships qualifying =

Floorball competition

The qualifying for the 2016 Men's World Floorball Championships took place between 2 and 14 February 2016. A total of 33 teams competed for fifteen spots. The final tournament was organized by Latvia in December 2016.

== Overview ==
Numbers in brackets show the ranking before the qualification started, which is based on results from the last two World Championships.

Europe 1	Europe 2	Europe 3	Europe 4	Asia/Oceania	Americas
Sweden (1); Slovakia (9); Russia (11); Belgium (24); France (25); Iceland (–)	Finland (2); Estonia (8); Denmark (12); Austria (22); Netherlands (28)	Switzerland (3); Germany (7); Poland (14); Spain (22); Great Britain (29); Georgia (38)	Czech Republic (4); Norway (6); Serbia (20); Italy (21); Slovenia (27); Liechtenstein (30)	Japan (15); Australia (16); South Korea (17); Singapore (18); New Zealand (26); Malaysia (33); Thailand (–)	United States (10); Canada (13); Jamaica (32)

== Europe ==
The qualification rules are as follows:

- The two best teams from each qualification group will qualify
- The two best third placed teams will qualify
  - The calculation of the best 3rd teams will follow this order:
    - 1. Average number of points
    - 2. Average goal difference
    - 3. Average scored goals
    - 4. Drawing of lots

=== European Qualification 1 ===
Dates: 3 – 7 February 2016
Venue: Arena Klokocina, Nitra, Slovakia

Team	Pld	W	D	L	GF	GA	GD	Pts	Qualification
Sweden	5	5	0	0	106	7	+99	10	Qualify for the 2016 Men's World Floorball Championships
Slovakia	5	4	0	1	50	31	+19	8	Qualify for the 2016 Men's World Floorball Championships
Russia	5	3	0	2	43	33	+10	6	Referred to the ranking of third-placed teams
Belgium	5	2	0	3	23	56	−33	4	Miss out on the 2016 Men's World Floorball Championships
Iceland	5	1	0	4	19	67	−48	2	Miss out on the 2016 Men's World Floorball Championships
France	5	0	0	5	13	60	−47	0	Miss out on the 2016 Men's World Floorball Championships

3 February 2016
Sweden	22 – 0	Belgium
Iceland	6 – 12	Russia
France	3 – 15	Slovakia
4 February 2016
Russia	4 – 15	Sweden
Belgium	7 – 3	France
Slovakia	11 – 0	Iceland
5 February 2016
France	3 – 12	Russia
Sweden	30 – 2	Iceland
Belgium	4 – 16	Slovakia
6 February 2016
Iceland	7 – 4	France
Russia	11 – 2	Belgium
Slovakia	1 – 20	Sweden
7 February 2016
Sweden	19 – 0	France
Russia	4 – 7	Slovakia
Belgium	10 – 4	Iceland

=== European Qualification 2 ===
Dates: 3 – 7 February 2016
Venue: TTÜ Sports Hall, Tallinn, Estonia

Team	Pld	W	D	L	GF	GA	GD	Pts	Qualification
Finland	4	4	0	0	66	5	+61	8	Qualify for the 2016 Men's World Floorball Championships
Estonia	4	3	0	1	26	20	+6	6	Qualify for the 2016 Men's World Floorball Championships
Denmark	4	2	0	2	32	20	+12	4	Referred to the ranking of third-placed teams
Austria	4	1	0	3	11	54	−43	2	Miss out on the 2016 Men's World Floorball Championships
Netherlands	4	0	0	4	7	43	−36	0	Miss out on the 2016 Men's World Floorball Championships

3 February 2016
Austria	1 – 23	Finland
Netherlands	1 – 9	Estonia
4 February 2016
Denmark	9 – 2	Netherlands
Estonia	9 – 2	Austria
5 February 2016
Netherlands	3 – 6	Austria
Finland	9 – 2	Denmark
6 February 2014
Finland	19 – 1	Netherlands
Denmark	2 – 7	Estonia
7 February 2016
Austria	2 – 19	Denmark
Estonia	1 – 15	Finland

=== European Qualification 3 ===
Dates: 3 – 7 February 2016
Venue: Arena Lochow, Lochow, Poland

Team	Pld	W	D	L	GF	GA	GD	Pts	Qualification
Switzerland	4	4	0	0	61	7	+54	8	Qualify for the 2016 Men's World Floorball Championships
Germany	4	3	0	1	30	13	+17	6	Qualify for the 2016 Men's World Floorball Championships
Poland	4	2	0	2	26	24	+2	4	Referred to the ranking of third-placed teams
Spain	4	1	0	3	13	34	−21	2	Miss out on the 2016 Men's World Floorball Championships
Great Britain	4	0	0	4	7	59	−52	0	Miss out on the 2016 Men's World Floorball Championships

3 February 2016
Switzerland	7 – 2	Germany
Spain	0 – 6	Poland
4 February 2016
Spain	2 – 4	Germany
Poland	14 – 1	Great Britain
5 February 2016
Great Britain	0 – 23	Switzerland
Germany	11 – 3	Poland
6 February 2014
Great Britain	5 – 9	Spain
Poland	3 – 12	Switzerland
7 February 2016
Switzerland	19 – 2	Spain
Germany	13 – 1	Great Britain

=== European Qualification 4 ===
Dates: 2 – 6 February 2016
Venue: Sports Hall Poden, Škofja Loka, Slovenia

Team	Pld	W	D	L	GF	GA	GD	Pts	Qualification
Czech Republic	5	5	0	0	85	3	+82	10	Qualify for the 2016 Men's World Floorball Championships
Norway	5	4	0	1	58	9	+49	8	Qualify for the 2016 Men's World Floorball Championships
Slovenia	5	3	0	2	27	25	+2	6	Referred to the ranking of third-placed teams
Serbia	5	2	0	3	18	51	−33	4	Miss out on the 2016 Men's World Floorball Championships
Italy	5	1	0	4	18	40	−22	2	Miss out on the 2016 Men's World Floorball Championships
Liechtenstein	5	0	0	5	4	82	−78	0	Miss out on the 2016 Men's World Floorball Championships

2 February 2016
Liechtenstein	0 – 35	Czech Republic
Serbia	6 – 5	Italy
Norway	7 – 2	Slovenia
3 February 2016
Czech Republic	21 – 0	Serbia
Italy	1 – 12	Norway
Slovenia	10 – 0	Liechtenstein
4 February 2016
Norway	3 – 5	Czech Republic
Serbia	9 – 2	Liechtenstein
Italy	4 – 8	Slovenia
5 February 2016
Liechtenstein	1 – 20	Norway
Czech Republic	13 – 0	Italy
Slovenia	7 – 3	Serbia
6 February 2014
Italy	8 – 1	Liechtenstein
Serbia	1 – 16	Norway
Czech Republic	11 – 0	Slovenia

=== Ranking of third-placed teams ===
Since the number of teams between the qualification groups differ, the group sizes were equalised by removing the results from the matches against the lowest placed teams in the larger-sized group before comparing the average results.

Team	Pld	W	D	L	GF	GA	GD	Pts	Qualification
Denmark	4	2	0	2	32	20	+12	4	Qualified for the 2016 Men's World Floorball Championships
Poland	4	2	0	2	26	24	+2	4	Qualified for the 2016 Men's World Floorball Championships
Russia	4	2	0	2	31	30	+1	4	Missed out on the 2016 Men's World Floorball Championships
Slovenia	4	2	0	2	17	25	−8	4	Missed out on the 2016 Men's World Floorball Championships

== Asia–Oceania ==
The qualification rules are as follows:

- The three best teams will qualify

Dates: 2 – 6 February 2016
Venue: Pattaya Sports Indoor Stadium, Pattaya, Thailand

=== Group A ===
Team	Pld	W	D	L	GF	GA	GD	Pts	Qualification
Japan	2	1	1	0	18	8	+10	3	Qualify for qualification semi-finals
Singapore	2	1	1	0	15	10	+5	3	Qualify for qualification semi-finals
New Zealand	2	0	0	2	6	21	−15	0	Qualify for 5th–7th-place play-off

2 February 2016
New Zealand	4 – 9	Singapore
3 February 2016
Japan	12 – 2	New Zealand
4 February 2016
Singapore	6–6	Japan

=== Group B ===
Team	Pld	W	D	L	GF	GA	GD	Pts	Qualification
Thailand	3	2	1	0	27	14	+13	5	Qualify for qualification semi-finals
Australia	3	1	2	0	15	9	+6	4	Qualify for qualification semi-finals
South Korea	3	1	1	1	17	16	+1	3	Qualify for 5th–7th-place play-off
Malaysia	3	0	0	3	8	28	−20	0	Qualify for 5th–7th-place play-off

2 February 2016
South Korea	6 – 9	Thailand
Australia	7 – 1	Malaysia
3 February 2016
Thailand	13 – 3	Malaysia
South Korea	3–3	Australia
4 February 2016
Thailand	5–5	Australia
Malaysia	4 – 8	South Korea

=== Play-off ===
==== 5th–7th-place play-off ====
5 February 2016
South Korea	4 – 3	New Zealand

==== 6th-place play-off ====
6 February 2016
New Zealand	3 – 4	Malaysia

==== Semi-finals ====
5 February 2016
Thailand	2 – 5	Singapore
Japan	2 – 4	Australia

==== Bronze medal game ====
6 February 2016
Japan	1 – 6	Thailand

==== Final ====
6 February 2016
Australia	5 – 2	Singapore

=== Final ranking ===
Rank	Team
1st place, gold medalist(s)	Australia
2nd place, silver medalist(s)	Singapore
3rd place, bronze medalist(s)	Thailand
4	Japan
5	South Korea
6	Malaysia
7	New Zealand

Qualified for the 2016 Men's World Floorball Championships.

== Americas ==
The qualification rules are as follows:

- The two best teams from the qualification group will qualify

Dates: 12 – 14 February 2016
Venue: Olympic Training Center, Colorado Springs, United States

Team	Pld	W	D	L	GF	GA	GD	Pts	Qualification
Canada	2	2	0	0	33	6	+27	4	Qualify for the 2016 Men's World Floorball Championships
United States	2	1	0	1	32	7	+25	2	Qualify for the 2016 Men's World Floorball Championships
Jamaica	2	0	0	2	2	54	−52	0	Miss out on the 2016 Men's World Floorball Championships

12 February 2016
Jamaica	1–27	United States
13 February 2016
Canada	27–1	Jamaica
14 February 2016
United States	5–6	Canada
