= 2016 Men's World Floorball Championships =

Floorball competition

Tournament details
- Host country: Latvia
- Venue(s): 2 (in 1 host city)
- Dates: 3–11 December 2016
- Teams: 16

Final positions
- Champions: Finland
- Runner-up: Sweden
- Third place: Switzerland

Tournament statistics
- Matches played: 48
- Attendance: 85,110 (1,773 per match)
- Scoring leader(s): (Finland) Peter Kotilainen

Awards
- MVP: (Finland) Peter Kotilainen

The 2016 Men's World Floorball Championships were the 11th World Championships in men's floorball. The tournament took place in Latvia in December 2016.

== Qualification ==
Host Qualified Did not qualify

Qualification events were conducted between 2 and 14 February 2016.

	Date	Venue	Vacancies	Qualified
Host nation			1	Latvia
European Qualification 1	3–7 February 2016	(Slovakia) Nitra	2	Sweden; Slovakia
European Qualification 2	3–7 February 2016	(Estonia) Tallinn	3	Finland; Estonia; Denmark
European Qualification 3	3–7 February 2016	(Poland) Lochow	3	Switzerland; Germany; Poland
European Qualification 4	2–6 February 2016	(Slovenia) Škofja Loka	2	Czech Republic; Norway
Asia-Oceania Qualification	2–6 February 2016	(Thailand) Pattaya	3	Australia; Singapore; Thailand
Americas Qualification	12–14 February 2016	(United States) Colorado Springs	2	Canada; United States
Total			16	

== Venues ==
Arena Riga	Olympic Sports Centre	2016 Men's World Floorball Championships is located in Latvia
Capacity: 10,300; The main competition arena.	Capacity: 800; The second competition arena and practice arena.	2016 Men's World Floorball Championships is located in Latvia

== Draw ==
The teams will be divided into four pots according to the world ranking. (World rankings shown in parentheses).

Pot 1	Pot 2	Pot 3	Pot 4
Sweden (1); Finland (2); Switzerland (3); Czech Republic (4)	Latvia (hosts) (5); Norway (6); Germany (7); Estonia (8)	Slovakia (9); United States (10); Denmark (12); Canada (13)	Poland (14); Australia (16); Singapore (18); Thailand (35)

== Results ==
=== Preliminary round ===
==== Group A ====
Pos	Team	Pld	W	D	L	GF	GA	GD	Pts	Qualification	Finland	Switzerland	Estonia	Germany
1	Finland	3	3	0	0	28	8	+20	6	Quarterfinals	—	6–4	10–3	12–1
2	Switzerland	3	2	0	1	23	13	+10	4	Quarterfinals	4–6	—	8–4	11–3
3	Estonia	3	0	1	2	13	24	−11	1	Play-off round	3–10	4–8	—	6–6
4	Germany	3	0	1	2	10	29	−19	1	Play-off round	1–12	3–11	6–6	—

Source: IFF

==== Group B ====
Pos	Team	Pld	W	D	L	GF	GA	GD	Pts	Qualification	Sweden	Czech Republic	Norway	Latvia
1	Sweden	3	3	0	0	23	8	+15	6	Quarterfinals	—	8–4	8–2	7–2
2	Czech Republic	3	2	0	1	21	15	+6	4	Quarterfinals	4–8	—	8–4	9–3
3	Norway	3	0	1	2	11	21	−10	1	Play-off round	2–8	4–8	—	5–5
4	Latvia (H)	3	0	1	2	10	21	−11	1	Play-off round	2–7	3–9	5–5	—

Source: IFF
(H) Hosts

==== Group C ====
Pos	Team	Pld	W	D	L	GF	GA	GD	Pts	Qualification	Denmark	Slovakia	Poland	Australia
1	Denmark	3	3	0	0	17	5	+12	6	Play-off round	—	5–2	4–2	8–1
2	Slovakia	3	2	0	1	20	11	+9	4	Play-off round	2–5	—	6–4	12–2
3	Poland	3	0	1	2	10	14	−4	1	13th–16th place playoff	2–4	4–6	—	4–4
4	Australia	3	0	1	2	7	24	−17	1	13th–16th place playoff	1–8	2–12	4–4	—

Source: IFF

==== Group D ====
Pos	Team	Pld	W	D	L	GF	GA	GD	Pts	Qualification	United States	Canada	Thailand	Singapore
1	United States	3	2	0	1	18	14	+4	4	Play-off round	—	8–1	5–4	5–9
2	Canada	3	2	0	1	8	13	−5	4	Play-off round	1–8	—	5–4	2–1
3	Thailand	3	1	0	2	16	12	+4	2	13th–16th place playoff	4–5	4–5	—	8–2
4	Singapore	3	1	0	2	12	15	−3	2	13th–16th place playoff	9–5	1–2	2–8	—

Source: IFF

=== Knock-out stage ===
Play-off; 7 December
Germany	6
United States	5
Norway	4
Slovakia	3
Latvia	5
Denmark (pen.)	6
Estonia	16
Canada	4

Quarterfinals; 8–9 December
Sweden	11
Germany	0
Switzerland	7
Norway	2
Finland	7
Denmark	0
Czech Republic	8
Estonia	2

Semifinals; 10 December
Sweden	7
Switzerland	2
Finland	4
Czech Republic	3

Final; 11 December
Sweden	3
Finland (pen.)	4
Third place
Czech Republic	5
Switzerland	8

==== Play-off ====
7 December 2016; 10:00	Germany	6–5 (2–1, 1–1, 3–3)	United States	Arena Riga; Attendance: 724

Game reference
			Referees: (Latvia) Māris Kumerdanks (Latvia) Kaspars Kristapsons
2 min	Penalties	2 min	Referees: (Latvia) Māris Kumerdanks (Latvia) Kaspars Kristapsons

7 December 2016; 13:00	Estonia	16–4 (7–2, 3–0, 6–2)	Canada	Arena Riga; Attendance: 497

Game reference
			Referees: (Finland) Vesa Vilkki (Finland) Mikko Alakare
4 min	Penalties	11 min	Referees: (Finland) Vesa Vilkki (Finland) Mikko Alakare

7 December 2016; 16:00	Norway	4–3 (1–1, 2–2, 1–0)	Slovakia	Arena Riga; Attendance: 608

Game reference
			Referees: (Latvia) Mārtiņš Larinovs (Latvia) Mārtiņš Gross
2 min	Penalties	4 min	Referees: (Latvia) Mārtiņš Larinovs (Latvia) Mārtiņš Gross

7 December 2016; 19:30	Latvia	5 – 6 PS (1–2, 4–0, 0–3); OT (0–0); PS (0–1)	Denmark	Arena Riga; Attendance: 2,633

Game reference
			Referees: (Czech Republic) Kamil Sojka (Czech Republic) Tomáš Sojka
10 min	Penalties	8 min	Referees: (Czech Republic) Kamil Sojka (Czech Republic) Tomáš Sojka

==== Quarterfinals ====
8 December 2016; 16:00	Czech Republic	8–2 (2–2, 4–0, 2–0)	Estonia	Arena Riga; Attendance: 833

Game reference
			Referees: (Finland) Vesa Vilkki (Finland) Mikko Alakare
2 min	Penalties	2 min	Referees: (Finland) Vesa Vilkki (Finland) Mikko Alakare

8 December 2016; 19:00	Sweden	11–0 (2–0, 5–0, 4–0)	Germany	Arena Riga; Attendance: 979

Game reference
			Referees: (Latvia) Mārtiņš Larinovs (Latvia) Mārtiņš Gross
0 min	Penalties	4 min	Referees: (Latvia) Mārtiņš Larinovs (Latvia) Mārtiņš Gross

9 December 2016; 16:10	Switzerland	7–2 (1–0, 3–0, 3–2)	Norway	Arena Riga; Attendance: 2,960

Game reference
			Referees: (Finland) Tero Fordell (Finland) Lasse Vuola
4 min	Penalties	4 min	Referees: (Finland) Tero Fordell (Finland) Lasse Vuola

9 December 2016; 19:00	Finland	7–0 (1–0, 4–0, 2–0)	Denmark	Arena Riga; Attendance: 3,422

Game reference
			Referees: (Sweden) Thomas Andersson (Sweden) Rickard Wissman
2 min	Penalties	5 min	Referees: (Sweden) Thomas Andersson (Sweden) Rickard Wissman

==== Semifinals ====
10 December 2016; 12:45	Sweden	7–2 (2–0, 0–2, 5–0)	Switzerland	Arena Riga; Attendance: 5,774

Game reference
Referees: (Finland) Vesa Vilkki (Finland) Mikko Alakare

10 December 2016; 16:30	Finland	4–3 (2–0,1–2,1–1)	Czech Republic	Arena Riga; Attendance: 6,445

Game reference
Referees: (Sweden) Håkan Söderman (Sweden) Glenn Boström

==== Bronze medal game ====
11 December 2016; 14:45	Czech Republic	5–8 (2–3, 1–2, 2–3)	Switzerland	Arena Riga; Attendance: 6,870

Game reference
Referees: (Sweden) Thomas Andersson (Sweden) Rickard Wissman

==== Final ====
11 December 2016; 17:40	Finland	4 – 3 PSO (2–2, 0–1, 1–0); 0–0 OT; 4–2 PSO	Sweden	Arena Riga; Attendance: 8,350

Game reference
Referees: (Latvia) Mārtiņš Larinovs (Latvia) Mārtiņš Gross

=== Placement matches ===
==== 13th place bracket ====
Matches 13th–16th
7 December – Olympic Sports Centre
Thailand	4
Australia	3
7 December – Olympic Sports Centre
Poland	14
Singapore	3

13th place
9 December – Olympic Sports Centre
Thailand	4
Poland	5
15th place
9 December – Olympic Sports Centre
Australia	9
Singapore	3

===== Matches 13th–16th =====
7 December 2016; 12:00	Thailand	4–3 (0–0, 2–1, 2–2)	Australia	Olympic Sports Centre, Riga; Attendance: 190

Game reference
			Referees: (Sweden) Håkan Söderman (Sweden) Glenn Boström
4 min	Penalties	4 min	Referees: (Sweden) Håkan Söderman (Sweden) Glenn Boström

7 December 2016; 15:00	Poland	14–3 (6–1, 2–1, 6–1)	Singapore	Olympic Sports Centre, Riga; Attendance: 166

Game reference
			Referees: (Finland) Tero Fordell (Finland) Lasse Vuola
0 min	Penalties	11 min	Referees: (Finland) Tero Fordell (Finland) Lasse Vuola

===== 15th place match =====
9 December 2016; 12:00	Australia	9–3 (1–1, 3–1, 5–1)	Singapore	Olympic Sports Centre, Riga; Attendance: 239

Game reference
			Referees: (Czech Republic) Kamil Sojka (Czech Republic) Tomáš Sojka
4 min	Penalties	6 min	Referees: (Czech Republic) Kamil Sojka (Czech Republic) Tomáš Sojka

===== 13th place match =====
9 December 2016; 15:00	Thailand	4–5 (0–2, 2–1, 2–2)	Poland	Olympic Sports Centre, Riga; Attendance: 175

Game reference
			Referees: (Latvia) Māris Kumerdanks (Latvia) Kaspars Kristapsons
2 min	Penalties	2 min	Referees: (Latvia) Māris Kumerdanks (Latvia) Kaspars Kristapsons

==== 9th place bracket ====
Matches 9th–11th
8 December – Arena Riga
Slovakia	7
United States	3
8 December – Arena Riga
Canada	1
Latvia	11

9th place
10 December – Arena Riga
Slovakia(OT)	6
Latvia	5
11th place
9 December – Arena Riga
United States	1
Canada	0

===== Matches 9th–12th =====
8 December 2016; 10:00	Slovakia	7–3 (1–1, 3–0, 3–2)	United States	Arena Riga; Attendance: 367

Game reference
			Referees: (Sweden) Thomas Andersson (Sweden) Rickard Wissman
4 min	Penalties	2 min	Referees: (Sweden) Thomas Andersson (Sweden) Rickard Wissman

8 December 2016; 13:00	Canada	1–11 (0–3, 1–5, 0–3)	Latvia	Arena Riga; Attendance: 674

Game reference
			Referees: (Sweden) Håkan Söderman (Sweden) Glenn Boström
6 min	Penalties	6 min	Referees: (Sweden) Håkan Söderman (Sweden) Glenn Boström

===== 11th place match =====
9 December 2016; 13:00	United States	1–0 (0–0, 0–0, 1–0)	Canada	Arena Riga; Attendance: 726

Game reference
			Referees: (Latvia) Mārtiņš Larinovs (Latvia) Mārtiņš Gross
4 min	Penalties	2 min	Referees: (Latvia) Mārtiņš Larinovs (Latvia) Mārtiņš Gross

===== 9th place match =====
10 December 2016; 19:30	Slovakia	6–5 OT (0–1,2–2, 3–2,1–0)	Latvia	Arena Riga; Attendance: 1,889

Game reference
		Referees: (Czech Republic) Kamil Sojka (Czech Republic) Tomáš Sojka
2 min	Penalties	Referees: (Czech Republic) Kamil Sojka (Czech Republic) Tomáš Sojka

==== 5th place bracket ====
Matches 5th–8th
10 December – Arena Riga
Denmark (OT)	6
Estonia	5
10 December – Olympic Sports Centre
Germany	5
Norway (OT)	6

5th place
11 December – Arena Riga
Denmark(pen.)	5
Norway	4
7th place
11 December – Arena Riga
Estonia	4
Germany	5

===== Matches 5th–8th =====
10 December 2016; 10:00	Denmark	6–5 OT (2–0, 3–1, 0–4, 1–0)	Estonia	Arena Riga; Attendance: 1,326

Game reference
		Referees: (Finland) Tero Fordell (Finland) Lasse Vuola
8 min	Penalties	Referees: (Finland) Tero Fordell (Finland) Lasse Vuola

10 December 2016; 11:00	Germany	5–6 OT (1–3, 1–0, 3–2, 0–1)	Norway	Olympic Sports Centre, Riga; Attendance: 311

Game reference
			Referees: (Latvia) Māris Kumerdanks (Latvia) Kaspars Kristapsons
7 min	Penalties	5 min	Referees: (Latvia) Māris Kumerdanks (Latvia) Kaspars Kristapsons

===== 7th place match =====
11 December 2016; 9:00	Estonia	4–5 (3–2,0–2, 1–1)	Germany	Arena Riga; Attendance: 970

Game reference
		Referees: (Latvia) Māris Kumerdanks (Latvia) Kaspars Kristapsons
2 min	Penalties	Referees: (Latvia) Māris Kumerdanks (Latvia) Kaspars Kristapsons

===== 5th place match =====
11 December 2016; 12:00	Denmark	5–4 PS (0–2, 1–0, 3–2); OT (0–0) (PS) (3–2)	Norway	Arena Riga; Attendance: 2,297

Game reference
			Referees: (Czech Republic) Kamil Sojka (Czech Republic) Tomáš Sojka
2 min	Penalties	4 min	Referees: (Czech Republic) Kamil Sojka (Czech Republic) Tomáš Sojka

== Ranking and statistics ==
=== Final ranking ===
The official IFF final ranking of the tournament:

Gold medal	Finland
Silver medal	Sweden
Bronze medal	Switzerland
4	Czech Republic
5	Denmark
6	Norway
7	Germany
8	Estonia
9	Slovakia
10	Latvia
11	United States
12	Canada
13	Poland
14	Thailand
15	Australia
16	Singapore

=== All-star team ===
- Best goalkeeper: (Switzerland) Pascal Meier
- Best defenders: (Finland) Krister Savonen, (Finland) Tatu Väänänen
- Best forwards: (Sweden) Alexander Galante Carlström, (Czech Republic) Matěj Jendrišák, (Finland) Peter Kotilainen
