= 2020 Men's World Floorball Championships =

Floorball competition

Tournament details
- Host country: Finland
- Venues: 2 (in 1 host city)
- Dates: 3–11 December 2021
- Teams: 16

Final positions
- Champions: Sweden
- Runners-up: Finland
- Third place: Czech Republic

Tournament statistics
- Matches played: 48
- Goals scored: 580 (12.08 per match)
- Attendance: 71,220 (1,484 per match)
- Scoring leader(s): (Estonia) Patrik Kareliusson (25 points)

Awards
- MVP: (Finland) Ville Lastikka

The 2020 Men's World Floorball Championships was the 13th World Championships in men's floorball. The tournament took place from 3 to 11 December 2021 in Helsinki, Finland. t was the third time that Finland hosted the men's world championship. The championship was originally scheduled to be held in December 2020, but due to measures against the spread of COVID-19, it was postponed by a year. As a result, the tournament partially overlapped with the Women's World Floorball Championship.

Sweden won their ninth world title after defeating Finland, the winners of the previous championship. The Czech Republic finished in third place, their first since the 2014 championship, after defeating Switzerland.

The championship also served as a qualification event for the 2022 World Games.

== Qualification ==
Host Direct qualification Qualified Did not qualify

35 teams registered for the championships. 16 qualified reach to the final tournament. Host country, Finland, qualified automatically. Though they did not ultimately qualify, Côte d'Ivoire became the first ever team from Africa to participate in the WFC Qualifiers.

In Europe, there were six qualification groups with three event locations – Frederikshavn in Denmark, Poprad in Slovakia, and Liepāja in Latvia. The Asia-Oceania qualifier in Bangkok, Thailand, was cancelled due to the COVID-19 pandemic. Instead the highest ranked countries of the region were qualified. USA and Canada both qualified automatically due to the World Games taking place in the United States in 2022.

	Date	Venue	Vacancies	Qualified
Host nation			1	Finland
Direct Qualification			2	United States; Canada
Highest Ranked Asia-Oceania Countries			2	~~Australia~~^{1} Singapore; Thailand; ~~Japan~~^{1}
European Qualification 1	30 January – 2 February 2020	(Denmark) Frederikshavn	3	Sweden; Poland; Denmark
European Qualification 2	30 January – 2 February 2020	(Slovakia) Poprad	3	Switzerland; Norway; Slovakia
European Qualification 3	30 January – 3 February 2020	(Latvia) Liepāja	3	Czech Republic; Latvia; Germany
Wildcard/Replacements			2	Estonia^{2} Philippines^{2}
Total				16

1.Australia and Japan confirmed to IFF that they were unable to travel due to COVID-19 travel restrictions, hence their withdrawal from the competition.
2.On 28 September 2021, the IFF Central Board confirmed the inclusion of Estonia and the Philippines to replace Australia and Japan.

== Venues ==
Helsinki
Hartwall Arena	Helsinki Ice Hall

== Tournament groups ==
After the group ballot, 16 teams are divided into 4 groups. In the group stage each team plays each other once, while the second stage of the event includes play-offs and placement matches.

The two best teams of group A and B go directly to the quarter-final. Teams placed 3rd and 4th in group A and B and the teams placed 1st and 2nd in group C and D make it to the first playoff round (played before the quarter-finals).

Group A	Group B	Group C	Group D
Finland (hosts); Sweden; Denmark; Latvia	Switzerland; Czech Republic; Germany; Norway	Slovakia; Poland; Thailand; United States	Canada; Singapore; Estonia^{1} Philippines^{1}

1.Estonia and the Philippines replaced Australia and Japan.

== Preliminary round ==
=== Group A ===
Pos	Team	Pld	W	D	L	GF	GA	GD	Pts	Qualification	Finland	Sweden	Latvia	Denmark
1	Finland (H)	3	3	0	0	21	5	+16	6	Quarterfinals	—	7–3	7–2	7–0
2	Sweden	3	2	0	1	29	9	+20	4	Quarterfinals	3–7	—	11–1	15–1
3	Latvia	3	0	1	2	8	23	−15	1	Play-off round	2–7	1–11	—	5–5
4	Denmark	3	0	1	2	6	27	−21	1	Play-off round	0–7	1–15	5–5	—

Source: IFF
(H) Hosts

3 December 2021; 15:15	Sweden	11–1 (2–1, 4–0, 5–0)	Latvia	Helsinki Ice Hall; Attendance: 573

Game reference
Linus Nordgern 10:10 (30:40); Alexander Galante Carlstorm 18:20 (28:40); Rasmus Enstorm 39:47; Tobias Gustafsson 47:23 (59:48); Kevin Haglund 47:50 (59:48); Kim Nilsson 48:44; Albin Sjorgen 52:16 / Goals / 04:01 Armands Savins

3 December 2021; 18:30	Finland	7–0 (5–0, 1–0, 1–0)	Denmark	Helsinki Ice Hall; Attendance: 2,665

Game reference
Nico Salo 03:13; Justus Kainulainen 04:02; Joonas Pylsy 08:11; Juha Kivilletho 12:23; Eemeli Salin 13:40 (42:30); Peter Kotilainen 39:18 / Goals

4 December 2021; 12:45	Denmark	5–5 (2–2, 0–2, 3–1)	Latvia	Helsinki Ice Hall; Attendance: 963

Game reference
Lukas Eldholm 04:18; Jonas Nordheim 12:25 / Goals / 18:07 Edgars Purins; 18:49 (25:29) Rolands Kovalevskis

4 December 2021; 18:55	Finland	7–3 (2–1, 1–1, 4–1)	Sweden	Helsinki Ice Hall; Attendance: 7,120

Game reference
Ville Lastikka 03:06 / Goals / 08:04 Ludwig Persson; 32:48 Kevin Haglund

5 December 2021; 15:00	Latvia	2–7 (1–2, 1–4, 0–1)	Finland	Helsinki Ice Hall; Attendance: 2,307

Game reference
Armands Savans 00:28 / Goals / 17:06 Rasmus Kainulainen

6 December 2021; 17:00	Denmark	1–15 (1–4, 0–3, 0–8)	Sweden	Helsinki Ice Hall; Attendance: 302

Game reference
Lukas Eldholm 19:18 / Goals / 01:45 Kim Nilsson; 02:06 Casper Backby

=== Group B ===
Pos	Team	Pld	W	D	L	GF	GA	GD	Pts	Qualification	Switzerland	Czech Republic	Norway	Germany
1	Switzerland	3	3	0	0	20	9	+11	6	Quarterfinals	—	4–2	7–5	9–2
2	Czech Republic	3	2	0	1	20	7	+13	4	Quarterfinals	2–4	—	3–7	11–0
3	Norway	3	1	0	2	15	18	−3	2	Play-off round	5–7	7–3	—	7–4
4	Germany	3	0	0	3	6	27	−21	0	Play-off round	2–9	0–11	4–7	—

Source: IFF

3 December 2021; 19:30	Germany	0–11 (0–3, 0–3, 0–5)	Czech Republic	Helsinki Ice Hall 2 Attendance: 113

Game reference
Goals / 12:40 Filip Forman; 15:21 Mikulas Krbec; 19:59 Filip Langer; 24:17 Adam Deelong; 38:28 Dominik Benes; 39:25 Filip Forman; 48:35 Ondrej Nemeck

4 December 2021; 15:30	Norway	5–7 (2–3, 2–1, 1–3)	Switzerland	Helsinki Ice Hall; Attendance: 2,233

Game reference
Marius Pedersen 13:21; Marius Pedersen 13:21; No Player 25:45 / Goals / 06:01 Christoph Meier; 09:01 Nils Conrad; 12:37 Manuel Maurer; 32:02 Jan Zaugg; 46:04 (58:01) Michael Schiess

5 December 2021; 12:00	Germany	4–7 (0–4, 3–0, 1–3)	Norway	Helsinki Ice Hall; Attendance: 512

Game reference
Niklas Broker 23:03 / Goals / 16:03 Marius Pedersen

5 December 2021; 18:45	Czech Republic	2–4 (2–1, 0–1, 0–2)	Switzerland	Helsinki Ice Hall; Attendance: 789

Game reference
Marek Benes 06:48 / Goals / 02:26 Joel Ruegger

6 December 2021; 17:15	Switzerland	9–2 (2–1, 2–0, 5–1)	Germany	Helsinki Ice Hall 2 Attendance: 155

Game reference
Tim Braillard 00:50 / Goals / 12:18 Tino von Prizbuer

6 December 2021; 19:45	Czech Republic	7–3 (2–0, 4–1, 1–2)	Norway	Helsinki Ice Hall; Attendance: 216

Game reference
Marek Benes 08:58 / Goals / 30:11 Patrick Hjemgard

=== Group C ===
Pos	Team	Pld	W	D	L	GF	GA	GD	Pts	Qualification	Slovakia	Poland	Thailand	United States
1	Slovakia	3	3	0	0	38	7	+31	6	Play-off round	—	8–4	15–2	15–1
2	Poland	3	2	0	1	30	14	+16	4	Play-off round	4–8	—	8–6	18–0
3	Thailand	3	1	0	2	17	26	−9	2	13th–16th place playoff	2–15	6–8	—	9–3
4	United States	3	0	0	3	4	42	−38	0	13th–16th place playoff	1–15	0–18	3–9	—

Source: IFF

3 December 2021; 14:00	Poland	8–6 (3–2, 1–3, 4–1)	Thailand	Helsinki Ice Hall 2 Attendance: 78

Game reference
Michal Sienko 05:30; Wojciech Malajka 16:40 (34:04); Alexander Dahlstorm 19:54; Lukasz Chlebda 47:00 / Goals / 11:00 Pheeraphong Khambanlue; 11:37 Santipong Sukkasem; 22:52 Prakasit Namsawang; 26:30 (28:51) Pawat Thaidit

3 December 2021; 16:45	Slovakia	15–1 (7–1, 4–0, 4–0)	United States	Helsinki Ice Hall 2 Attendance: 67

Game reference
Michal Dudovic 00:38 (18:01); Ladislav Gal 03:09 (06:06), 31:55; Ladislav Mirt 08:23; Matus Gadjos 15:08; Jakub Grich 18:41 / Goals / 10:03 Alexander Mcvey

4 December 2021; 14:45	Thailand	9–3 (2–1, 2–0, 5–2)	United States	Helsinki Ice Hall 2 Attendance: 421

Game reference
Santipong Sukkasem 07:21 / Goals / 03:03 David Hansen

4 December 2021; 17:30	Poland	4–8 (1–3, 1–3, 2–2)	Slovakia	Helsinki Ice Hall 2 Attendance: 721

Game reference
Wojciech Malajka 10:59 / Goals / 06:59 Michal Dudovic

5 December 2021; 17:30	Thailand	2–15 (1–5, 1–5, 0–5)	Slovakia	Helsinki Ice Hall 2 Attendance: 275

Game reference
Alexander Rinefalk 02:16 / Goals / 02:26 Michal Dudovic

6 December 2021; 14:30	United States	0–18 (0–7, 0–7, 0–4)	Poland	Helsinki Ice Hall 2 Attendance: 127

Game reference
Goals / 00:22 Karol Pelczarski

=== Group D ===
Pos	Team	Pld	W	D	L	GF	GA	GD	Pts	Qualification	Estonia	Canada	Philippines	Singapore
1	Estonia	3	3	0	0	47	12	+35	6	Play-off round	—	21–4	13–6	13–2
2	Canada	3	2	0	1	26	37	−11	4	Play-off round	4–21	—	13–8	9–8
3	Philippines	3	1	0	2	23	30	−7	2	13th–16th place playoff	6–13	8–13	—	9–4
4	Singapore	3	0	0	3	14	31	−17	0	13th–16th place playoff	2–13	8–9	4–9	—

Source: IFF

3 December 2021; 12:30	Singapore	8–9 (3–2, 0–3, 5–4)	Canada	Helsinki Ice Hall; Attendance: 350

Game reference
Suria R 05:06; Suria R 45:03; Jenmark Sorreda 06:02; Jenmark Sorreda 49:51; Abdul Mateen Amir Mirza 11:14; Chee Yong Lee 50:00; Chee Yong Lee 56:19; Suria R 47:22; Jian Long Him 52:38 / Goals / 06:44 Jonathan Kuysten; 09:56 (36:12) Valtteri Viitakoski; 32:32 Valetteri Viitakoski; 43:11 Lauri Berg; 32:20 Cameron Buck; 47:13 Valteri Viitakoski; 50:27 Valteri Viitakoski

4 December 2021; 12:00	Philippines	6–13 (0–3, 2–7, 4–3)	Estonia	Helsinki Ice Hall 2 Attendance: 301

Game reference
Kristoffer Jandelius	Goalies	Daniel Vaigur
Fredrik Jeppsson Escabel 37:12 / Goals / 02:34 (22:16), 33:16 Patrik Karelusson; 04:32 (22:16) Mathias Einamann; 19:18 (21:51), 23:20 Tanel Kasenurm

5 December 2021; 12:00	Singapore	4–9 (0–5, 1–1, 3–3)	Philippines	Helsinki Ice Hall 2 Attendance: 295

Game reference
Hafiz Zubir 28:18 / Goals / 04:07 Melvin Alm Mendoza

5 December 2021; 14:45	Canada	4–21 (1–6, 2–9, 1–6)	Estonia	Helsinki Ice Hall 2 Attendance: 311

Game reference
Lauri Berg 16:29 / Goals / 02:49 Patrik Kareliusson

6 December 2021; 10:15	Estonia	13–2 (4–0, 3–1, 6–1)	Singapore	Helsinki Ice Hall; Attendance: 103

Game reference
Roman Pass 01:20 / Goals / 27:35 Thaddeus Tan

6 December 2021; 13:00	Canada	13–8 (6–3, 4–3, 3–2)	Philippines	Helsinki Ice Hall; Attendance: 306

Game reference
Brandon Barber 04:22 / Goals / 01:52 Melvin Alm Mendoza

== Knock-out stage ==
Play-off; 7 December
Germany	3
Slovakia	7
Latvia	16
Canada	3
Denmark	3
Estonia	5
Norway	7
Poland	3

Quarterfinals; 8–9 December
Finland	5
Slovakia	1
Czech Republic	9
Latvia	1
Switzerland	9
Estonia	0
Sweden	8
Norway	2

Semifinals; 10 December
Finland	3
Czech Republic	2
Switzerland	1
Sweden	6

Final; 11 December
Finland	4
Sweden	6
Third place
Czech Republic	4
Switzerland	3

=== Play-off ===
7 December 2021; 13:00	Germany	3–7 (0–3, 1–1, 2–3)	Slovakia	Helsinki Ice Hall; Attendance: 473

Game reference
Sascha Herlt 33:23 / Goals / 06:51 Ladislav Mirt; 11:52 Tomas Kvasnica

7 December 2021; 19:00	Norway	7–3 (2–1, 1–2, 4–0)	Poland	Helsinki Ice Hall; Attendance: 163

Game reference
Daniel Gidske 11:41 / Goals / 16:45 Lukasz Widurski

7 December 2021; 10:00	Denmark	3–5 (0–0, 2–2, 1–3)	Estonia	Helsinki Ice Hall; Attendance: 1,065

Game reference
Mikkel Christensen 23:36 / Goals / 29:20 Artur Ouruzko

7 December 2021; 16:00	Latvia	16–3 (6–1, 3–0, 7–2)	Canada	Helsinki Ice Hall; Attendance: 213

Game reference
Petris Trekse 00:03 (01:43) / Goals / 02:36 (04:58) Valtteri Vittakoski

=== Quarterfinals ===
8 December 2021; 15:30	Czech Republic	9–1 (1–0, 2–1, 6–0)	Latvia	Helsinki Ice Hall; Attendance: 468

Game reference
Adam Delong 06:45 / Goals / 24:35 Kevins Smiths

8 December 2021; 18:45	Finland	5–1 (2–0, 2–1, 1–0)	Slovakia	Helsinki Ice Hall; Attendance: 1,728

Game reference
Ville Lastikka 16:57; Rasmus Kainulainen 19:22 / Goals / 29:48 Lukas Ujhelyi

9 December 2021; 15:30	Switzerland	9–0 (3–0, 2–0, 4–0)	Estonia	Helsinki Ice Hall; Attendance: 1,209

Game reference
Jan Zaugg 09:44; Luca Graf 12:17 / Goals

9 December 2021; 18:30	Sweden	8–2 (6–0, 0–0, 2–2)	Norway	Helsinki Ice Hall; Attendance: 1,112

Game reference
Johan Sammuelson 00:53 (05:31); Kim Nilsson 01:20; Alexander Galante Carlstorm 09:12 / Goals / 46:21 Ketil Kronberg

=== Semifinals ===
10 December 2021; 15:30	Switzerland	1–6 (0–2, 1–0, 0–4)	Sweden	Hartwall Arena; Attendance: 6,453

Game reference
Claudio Laely 24:48 / Goals / 11:24 No Player

10 December 2021; 18:45	Finland	3–2 (0–2, 2–0, 1–0)	Czech Republic	Hartwall Arena; Attendance: 10,263

Game reference
Justus Kaiullainen 32:08 / Goals / 13:28 Adam Hemerka

=== Bronze medal game ===
11 December 2021; 14:30	Czech Republic	4–3 OT (1–1, 0–1, 2–1); OT: 1–0	Switzerland	Hartwall Arena; Attendance: 10,065

Game reference
Josef Rypar 12:05 / Goals / 16:18 Christoph Camenisch

=== Final ===
11 December 2021; 17:30	Finland	4–6 (2–0, 0–3, 2–3)	Sweden	Hartwall Arena; Attendance: 12,508

Game reference
Justus Kainulainen 01:26 / Goals / 24:59 Rasmus Enstrom

== Placement matches ==
=== 5th place bracket ===
5th–8th place semi-finals
10 December
Slovakia	2
Latvia	6
10 December
Estonia	4
Norway	5

5th place
11 December
Latvia	4
Norway	2
7th place
11 December
Slovakia	8
Estonia	7

=== 5th–8th place semi-finals ===
10 December 2021; 10:00	Slovakia	2–6 (0–1, 1–2, 1–3)	Latvia	Helsinki Ice Hall 2 Attendance: 323

Game reference
Lukas Rezanina 23:10 / Goals / 09:39 Kevins Smits

10 December 2021; 13:00	Estonia	4–5 OT (2–2, 0–2, 2–0); OT: 0–1	Norway	Helsinki Ice Hall 2 Attendance: 240

Game reference

=== 5th place match ===
11 December 2021; 13:00	Latvia	4–2 (0–0, 3–0, 1–2)	Norway	Helsinki Ice Hall 2 Attendance: 143

Game reference

=== 7th place match ===
11 December 2021; 10:00	Slovakia	8–7 OT (3–1, 3–3, 1–3); OT: 1–0	Estonia	Helsinki Ice Hall 2 Attendance: 163

Game reference

=== 9th place bracket ===
9th–11th place semi-finals
8 December
Poland	3
Denmark	7
8 December
Canada	7
Germany	15

9th place
9 December
Denmark	3
Germany	6
11th place
9 December
Poland (p.s.o)	6
Canada	5

=== 9th–12th place semi-finals ===
8 December 2021; 11:00	Canada	7–15 (1–3, 2–4, 4–8)	Germany	Helsinki Ice Hall 2 Attendance: 360

Game reference
Brandon Barder 09:19 / Goals / 13:35 Janos Broker

8 December 2021; 12:30	Poland	3–7 (1–5, 1–2, 1–0)	Denmark	Helsinki Ice Hall; Attendance: 812

Game reference
Alexander Dahlstrom 12:56 / Goals / 08:30 Daniel Mac Cabe

=== 9th place match ===
9 December 2021; 12:30	Denmark	3–6 (2–1, 0–4, 1–1)	Germany	Helsinki Ice Hall 2 Attendance: 574

Game reference
Jonas Nordheim 19:11 / Goals / 07:19 Nils Hofferbert

=== 11th place match ===
9 December 2021; 09:30	Poland	6–5 PSO (1–2, 2–3, 2–0); OT: 0–0; PSO: 3–1	Canada	Helsinki Ice Hall 2 Attendance: 1,013

Game reference
Wojciech Malajka 14:36 / Goals / 12:14 Valtteri Viitakoski

=== 13th place bracket ===
13th–16th place semi-finals
7 December
Philippines	10
United States	5
7 December
Thailand	11
Singapore	6

13th place
8 December
Philippines	8
Thailand (p.s.o.)	9
15th place
8 December
United States	4
Singapore	2

=== 13th–16th place semi-finals ===
7 December 2021; 14:30	Philippines	10–5 (4–3, 2–1, 4–1)	United States	Helsinki Ice Hall 2 Attendance: 101

Game reference
Lucas Werelius 00:45 / Goals / 09:37 William Erikkson

7 December 2021; 17:15	Thailand	11–6 (4–1, 6–1, 1–4)	Singapore	Helsinki Ice Hall 2 Attendance: 217

Game reference
Pawat Thaidt 00:39 / Goals / 18:26 Zong Wei Tng

=== 13th place match ===
8 December 2021; 17:00	Philippines	8–9 PSO (2–3, 2–1, 4–4); OT: 0–0; PSO: 1–2	Thailand	Helsinki Ice Hall 2 Attendance: 128

Game reference
Melvin Alm Mendoza 12:03 / Goals / 00:42 Pawat Thaidt

=== 15th place match ===
8 December 2021; 14:00	United States	4–2 (0–1, 2–0, 2–1)	Singapore	Helsinki Ice Hall 2 Attendance: 123

Game reference
Alexander McVey 23:06 / Goals / 18:46 Chee Yong Lee

== Ranking and statistics ==
=== Final ranking ===
The official IFF final ranking of the tournament:

Gold medal	Sweden
Silver medal	Finland
Bronze medal	Czech Republic
4	Switzerland
5	Latvia
6	Norway
7	Slovakia
8	Estonia
9	Germany
10	Denmark
11	Poland
12	Canada
13	Thailand
14	Philippines
15	United States
16	Singapore

=== Qualification for the 2022 World Games ===
Qualify to the 2022 World Games
Qualify to the 2022 World Games via regional rank

#	Overall	Americas	Asia Oceania
1	Sweden	Canada	Thailand
2	Finland		
3	Czech Republic		
4	Switzerland		
5	Latvia		

=== All-star team ===
Tournament all-star team:

- Best goalkeeper: (Czech Republic) Lukáš Bauer
- Best defenders: (Finland) Juha Kivilehto, (Sweden) Tobias Gustafsson
- Best center: (Finland) Justus Kainulainen
- Best forwards: (Czech Republic) Marek Beneš, (Finland) Ville Lastikka
