= United States men's national floorball team =

United States Men's Floorball Team
- Founded: 2002
- Coach: (Finland) Matti Kaipio
- First game: (United States) 10 - 2 (Belgium); May 18, 2002
- Largest win: (United States) 27 - 0 (Jamaica); January 31, 2014
- Largest defeat: (Sweden) 20 - 0 (United States); September 28, 2017

The United States men's national floorball team is the men's national floorball team of the United States, and a member of the International Floorball Federation (IFF). The American men's team is currently ranked 25th in the world and failed to qualify for the 2026 World Floorball Championships.

The United States National Team is organized by USA Floorball.

== Results ==
=== All-Time World Championship Records ===
Year	GP	W	D	L	GF	GA	+/-	Result
Finland 2002	6	2	1	3	21	23	-2	14th
Switzerland 2004	5	2	0	3	18	24	-6	17th
Sweden 2006	5	2	0	3	31	44	-13	17th
Czechia 2008	6	4	0	2	36	33	+3	13th
Switzerland 2012	5	1	0	4	23	37	-14	12th
Sweden 2014	6	3	0	3	35	23	+12	11th
Latvia 2016	6	3	0	3	27	27	0	11th
Finland 2020	5	1	0	4	13	54	-41	15th
Total	44	18	1	25	204	265	-61	

=== Head-to-Head International Records ===
Opponent	GP	W	D	L	GF	GA	+/-
Canada	19	6	1	12	76	119	-43
Belgium	5	2	0	3	27	43	-16
Poland	5	1	0	4	13	36	-23
Iceland	4	2	0	2	20	19	+1
Japan	4	3	0	1	26	15	+11
Singapore	4	3	0	1	29	21	+8
Germany	3	0	0	3	14	21	-7
Hungary	3	1	0	2	17	24	-7
Slovakia	3	0	0	3	6	26	-20
Thailand	3	1	0	2	11	20	-9
Australia	2	1	1	0	5	4	+1
Austria	2	1	0	1	9	10	-1
Czechia	2	0	0	2	5	26	-21
Great Britain	2	1	0	1	11	11	0
Italy	2	0	0	2	4	12	-8
Jamaica	2	2	0	0	54	1	+53
Estonia	1	0	0	1	1	13	-12
Finland	1	0	0	1	0	16	-16
Korea	1	1	0	0	12	2	+10
Latvia	1	0	0	1	3	8	-5
Netherlands	1	1	0	0	8	4	+4
Norway	1	0	0	1	2	6	-4
Philippines	1	0	0	1	5	10	-5
Russia	1	0	0	1	1	7	-6
Serbia	1	0	0	1	4	5	-1
Slovenia	1	1	0	0	6	3	+3
Sweden	1	0	0	1	0	20	-20
Switzerland	1	0	0	1	0	17	-17
Totals	77	27	2	48	369	519	-150

== Roster ==
As of April 22, 2026

#	Player	Club	Pos.	Grip	Age	Birthplace
3	Landon VanPatten	(United States) NTFA	F	R	18	United States
7	Ethan VanPatten	(United States) NTFA	GK	R	21	United States
10	Isak Angerstig	(United States) NTFA	F	L	28	United States
12	Andreas Sievert	(United States) Menlo Park FC	D	L	43	United States
15	Oliver Parent	(United States) Colorado FC	F	L	17	Japan
16	David Hansen	(Sweden) Torshalla IBK	F	L	24	United States
19	Daniel Hansen	(Sweden) Mesta IBK	D	L	27	Sweden
21	Maxim Tarasyuk	(Ukraine) FLC Iceberg	D	L	23	United States
22	Henri Keskimaula	(United States) NTFA	F	L	1818	Canada
27	Lucas Packalén	(Sweden) Pixbo IBK	D	R	20	United States
29	Adam Petersson-Taylor	(Sweden) FC Helsingborg	D	R	19	Finland
37	Keene Addington	(United States) Chicago Dogs	F	L	21	United States
64	Case Connor	(United States) NTFA	F	R	24	United States
70	Ryan Folic	(United States) NTFA	F	L	19	United States
77	Caleb Lederman	(United States) Colorado FC	F	R	18	United States
79	Mikko Vähä-Vahe	(Finland) Grankulla IFK	D	L	32	United States
88	Reed Hearns	(Sweden) IBK Goteborg	D	R	34	United States
89	Ian Meyer	(Germany) Blau-Weiss 96 Schenefeld	D	L	20	United States
93	Derek Moser	(United States) Sonoma County FC	D	R	32	United States
95	Trent Kling	(United States) Colorado FC	GK	R	39	United States

=== Team Staff ===
Head Coach - Matti Kaipio (Finland)

General Manager - Ryan Connor (United States)

Assistant Coach - Tuomas Korhonen (Finland)

Assistant Coach - Nick VanPatten (United States)

Assistant General Manager - Cole Connor (United States)

Team Manager - Joel Olofsson (Sweden)

Team Manager - Jared Colleps (United States)

Team Manager - Dan Torretta (United States)
