= 2018 Men's World Floorball Championships =

Floorball competition

Tournament details
- Host country: Czech Republic
- Venues: 2 (in 1 host city)
- Dates: 1–9 December 2018
- Teams: 16

Final positions
- Champions: Finland
- Runners-up: Sweden
- Third place: Switzerland

Tournament statistics
- Matches played: 48
- Goals scored: 507 (10.56 per match)
- Attendance: 181,518 (3,782 per match)
- Scoring leader(s): (Slovakia) Michal Dudovič (21 points)

Awards
- MVP: (Switzerland) Pascal Meier

The 2018 Men's World Floorball Championships were the 12th World Championships in men's floorball. The tournament took place in Prague, Czech Republic, from 1 to 9 December 2018. It was the third time the Czech Republic hosted the men's world championship, having last done so in 2008.

The final standings for the top four places remained the same as in the previous championship. Finland won for the second consecutive time after defeating Sweden in the final. The Czech Republic finished in fourth place, also for the second time in a row, following a loss to Switzerland.

Records for both total and average world championship attendance were broken, with the matches drawing a total of 181,518 spectators, an average of 3,782 per game. The previous record was set in 2014 with 104,445 attendees. The single-match attendance record was also broken twice on the same day. First, the third-place match was watched by 16,112 spectators, and immediately following that, 16,276 people attended the final.

It was the first men's world championship where matches were officiated by female referees.

== Qualification ==
Host Qualified Did not qualify

33 teams have registered for the championships, only 16 of them to reach the final group. Host country, Czech Republic, qualifies automatically.

In Europe, there were four qualification groups with three event locations – Tallinn (Estonia), Nitra (Slovakia) and Valmiera (Latvia). The Asia-Oceania group tournament took place in Jeju Island, South Korea. It was the first IFF event hosted by Korea. USA and Canada played their qualification in Toronto, Canada.

	Date	Venue	Vacancies	Qualified
Host nation			1	Czech Republic
Asia-Oceania Qualification	22–27 January 2018	(South Korea) Jeju Island	4	Australia; Singapore; Thailand; Japan
European Qualification 1	31 January – 4 February 2018	(Estonia) Tallinn	3	Finland; Estonia; Poland
European Qualification 2	31 January – 4 February 2018	(Slovakia) Nitra	3	Sweden; Germany; Slovakia
European Qualification 3	30 January – 3 February 2018	(Latvia) Valmiera	2	Switzerland; Latvia
European Qualification 4	31 January – 4 February 2018	(Slovakia) Nitra	2	Denmark; Norway
Americas Qualification	10–11 February 2018	(Canada) Toronto	1	Canada
Total			16	

== Venues ==
O_{2} arena	Aréna Sparta – Podvinný mlýn	2018 Men's World Floorball Championships is located in Czech Republic
Capacity: 17 000; The main competition arena.	Capacity: 1 300; The second competition arena and practice arena.	2018 Men's World Floorball Championships is located in Czech Republic
Address: Českomoravská 2345/17, Praha 9 Opened since: 2004; Distance to city center: cca 10 km	Address: Kovanecká 2405/27, Praha 9 Opened since: 2008; Distance to city center: cca 10 km	2018 Men's World Floorball Championships is located in Czech Republic

== Tournament groups ==
After the group ballot, 16 teams are divided into 4 groups. In the group stage each team plays each other once, while the second stage of the event includes play-offs and placement matches.

The two best teams of group A and B go directly to the quarter-final. Teams placed 3rd and 4th in group A and B and the teams placed 1st and 2nd in group C and D make it to the first playoff round (played before the quarter-finals).

Group A	Group B	Group C	Group D
Switzerland; Czech Republic (hosts); Latvia; Germany	Sweden; Finland; Norway; Denmark	Australia; Estonia; Poland; Thailand	Canada; Slovakia; Singapore; Japan

== Preliminary round ==
All times are local (UTC+1).

=== Group A ===
Pos	Team	Pld	W	D	L	GF	GA	GD	Pts	Qualification	Czech Republic	Switzerland	Germany	Latvia
1	Czech Republic (H)	3	2	0	1	19	13	+6	4	Quarterfinals	—	6–4	10–5	3–4
2	Switzerland	3	2	0	1	24	10	+14	4	Quarterfinals	4–6	—	13–1	7–3
3	Germany	3	1	0	2	11	27	−16	2	Play-off round	5–10	1–13	—	5–4
4	Latvia	3	1	0	2	11	15	−4	2	Play-off round	4–3	3–7	4–5	—

Source: IFF
(H) Hosts

=== Group B ===
Pos	Team	Pld	W	D	L	GF	GA	GD	Pts	Qualification	Sweden	Finland	Norway	Denmark
1	Sweden	3	3	0	0	39	5	+34	6	Quarterfinals	—	5–4	9–1	25–0
2	Finland	3	2	0	1	20	7	+13	4	Quarterfinals	4–5	—	9–1	7–1
3	Norway	3	1	0	2	11	21	−10	2	Play-off round	1–9	1–9	—	9–3
4	Denmark	3	0	0	3	4	41	−37	0	Play-off round	0–25	1–7	3–9	—

Source: IFF

=== Group C ===
Pos	Team	Pld	W	D	L	GF	GA	GD	Pts	Qualification	Estonia	Australia	Poland	Thailand
1	Estonia	3	3	0	0	26	2	+24	6	Play-off round	—	11–5	4–3	11–4
2	Australia	3	2	0	1	13	16	−3	4	Play-off round	5–11	—	4–2	4–3
3	Poland	3	1	0	2	10	10	0	2	13th–16th place playoff	3–4	2–4	—	5–2
4	Thailand	3	0	0	3	9	20	−11	0	13th–16th place playoff	4–11	3–4	2–5	—

Source: IFF

=== Group D ===
Pos	Team	Pld	W	D	L	GF	GA	GD	Pts	Qualification	Slovakia	Canada	Singapore	Japan
1	Slovakia	3	3	0	0	45	6	+39	6	Play-off round	—	12–3	18–2	15–1
2	Canada	3	1	1	1	21	18	+3	3	Play-off round	3–12	—	4–4	14–2
3	Singapore	3	1	1	1	15	27	−12	3	13th–16th place playoff	2–18	4–4	—	9–5
4	Japan	3	0	0	3	8	38	−30	0	13th–16th place playoff	1–15	2–14	5–9	—

Source: IFF

== Knock-out stage ==
Play-off; 5 December
Denmark	3
Estonia	2
Germany	7
Canada	2
Latvia	6
Slovakia	1
Norway	10
Australia	0

Quarterfinals; 6–7 December
Czech Republic	10
Denmark	1
Finland	6
Germany	1
Sweden	14
Latvia	1
Switzerland	3 (OT)
Norway	2

Semifinals; 8 December
Czech Republic	2
Finland	7
Sweden	5 (P)
Switzerland	4

Final; 9 December
Finland	6
Sweden	3
Third place
Czech Republic	2
Switzerland	4

=== Play-off ===
5 December 2018; 10:00	Latvia	6–1 (2–1, 0–0, 4–0)	Slovakia	O2 Arena; Attendance: 7,069

Game reference

Jānis Salcevičs
Goalies
Rastislav Mazák
Referees:
(Sweden) Håkan Söderman
(Sweden) Glenn Boström

	0–1	2:22 – Mráz (Kubovič)
Ceriņš (Raitums) – 8:14	1–1
Jansons (Blinds) – 12:50	2–1
Cerins (J. Rajeckis) – 44:03	3–1
Jansons – 54:18	4–1
Trekše (A. Rajeckis) – 57:52	5–1
Kovaļevskis (Raitums) – 59:45	6–1

6 min
Penalties
6 min

5 December 2018; 12:45	Denmark	3–2 (1–0, 0–1, 2–1)	Estonia	O2 Arena; Attendance: 4,013

Game reference

Mike Trolle
Goalies
Daniel Vaigur
Referees:
(Finland) Henri Heinola
(Finland) Manu Marttinen

Odfeldt (Dalkvist) – 7:06	1–0
	1–1	32:09 – Kareliusson (Widercrantz)
Schmidt (Buckner) – 45:50	2–1
	2–2	46:32 – Tamme (Pass)
Nielsen (Odfeldt) – 51:46	3–2

7 min
Penalties
0 min

5 December 2018; 15:30	Norway	10–0 (3–0, 4–0, 3–0)	Australia	Arena Sparta; Attendance: 365

Game reference

Andreas Falkeid
Goalies
Eythan Yeoh
Referees:
(Czech Republic) Kamil Sojka
(Czech Republic) Tomáš Sojka

no scorer (own goal) – 2:12	1–0
Kvisvik (Normann) – 2:37	2–0
Jansson (Olesen) (PP) – 6:16	3–0
Jansson (Olesen) – 23:53	4–0
Bjerknes (Kronberg) – 31:52	5–0
Kronberg (Bjerknes) – 33:58	6–0
Olesen (Normann) (SH) – 39:38	7–0
Kvisvik (Normann) – 40:40	8–0
Olesen (Jansson) – 47:51	9–0
Kronberg (Bjerknes) – 52:03	10–0

6 min
Penalties
2 min

5 December 2018; 18:30	Germany	7–2 (2–1, 3–1, 2–0)	Canada	Arena Sparta; Attendance: 282

Game reference

Nils Hallerstede
Goalies
Taylor Shipp
Referees:
(Finland) Vesa Vilkki
(Finland) Mikko Alakare

	0–1	0:39 – Viitakoski (Kuysten)
Blanke (Hoppe) – 7:01	1–1
Schuschwary (J. Bröker) – 16:41	2–1
Weigelt (Schuschwary) – 29:52	3–1
Blanke (Ruger) – 30:45	4–1
von Pritzbuer (Nihlen) – 36:47	5–1
	5–2	37:40 – Barber (Viitakoski) (PP)
von Pritzbuer (Siede) – 48:15	6–2
Siede (Schuschwary) (PP) – 58:56	7–2

6 min
Penalties
6 min

=== Quarterfinals ===
6 December 2018; 16:30	Switzerland	3–2 OT (1–1, 0–0, 1–1, 1–0)	Norway	O2 Arena; Attendance: 3,977

Game reference

Pascal Meier
Goalies
Markus Jelsnes
Referees:
(Latvia) Mārtiņš Larinovs
(Latvia) Mārtiņš Gross

Rüegger (Laely) – 7:16	1–0
	1–1	14:59 – Bjerknes (Fredriksen)
Maurer (Meier) – 41:24	2–1
	2–2	56:18 – Kronberg (Jelsnes)
Braillard (Laely) – 60:30	3–2

0 min
Penalties
2 min

6 December 2018; 19:30	Czech Republic	10–1 (3–1, 4–0, 3–0)	Denmark	O2 Arena; Attendance: 5,073

Game reference

Lukáš Souček
Goalies
Mike Trolle
Referees:
(Sweden) Håkan Söderman
(Sweden) Glenn Boström

Rýpar (Suchánek) – 4:49	1–0
Šebek (Jendrišák) – 5:03	2–0
	2–1	10:55 – Glass (Eldholm)
Doza (Pražan) – 13:14	3–1
Jendrišák (Němeček) – 23:39	4–1
Kisugite (Curney) – 25:52	5–1
Veltšmíd (Beneš) – 30:32	6–1
Jendrišák (Kisugite) – 37:07	7–1
Jendrišák (Rýpar) (PP) – 43:46	8–1
Delong (Rýpar) – 50:57	9–1
Němeček (Curney) – 59:27	10–1

2 min
Penalties
4 min

7 December 2018; 15:10	Sweden	14–1 (7–0, 5–1, 2–0)	Latvia	O2 Arena; Attendance: 3,871

Game reference

Måns Parsjö-Tegner
Goalies
Jānis Salcevičs
Ivars Dišereits
Referees:
(Finland) Henri Heinola
(Finland) Manu Marttinen

Enström (Johansson) – 0:23	1–0
Wilhelmsson (Palmen) – 2:08	2–0
Rudd (PS) – 4:05	3–0
Carlström (Johansson) – 10:06	4–0
Sjögren (Rudd) – 11:19	5–0
Hedlund (Johansson) – 13:08	6–0
Enström (Hedlund) – 17:40	7–0
Johansson – 20:27	8–0
Enström (Samuelsson) – 22:34	9–0
	9–1	23:35 – Kovaļevskis (Trekše)
Östholm (Wilhelmsson) – 30:04	10–1
Östholm – 36:35	11–1
Nilsson (Wilhelmsson) (DP) – 39:59	12–1
Gustafsson (Sjögren) – 47:56	13–1
Carlström (Hedlund) – 49:47	14–1

0 min
Penalties
2 min

7 December 2018; 18:00	Finland	6–1 (2–0, 2–1, 2–0)	Germany	O2 Arena; Attendance: 3,772

Game reference

Lassi Toriseva
Goalies
Mike Dietz
Referees:
(Switzerland) Sandra Zurbuchen
(Switzerland) Corina Wehinger

Johansson (Salo) – 0:48	1–0
Salo (Johansson) – 6:00	2–0
Kotilainen (Kukkola) – 22:42	3–0
Kotilainen (Kivilehto) – 30:52	4–0
	4–1	37:23 – Nihlen (von Pritzbuer)
Johansson (Salin) – 44:00	5–1
Kukkola (Johansson) – 59:20	6–1

0 min
Penalties
0 min

=== Semifinals ===
8 December 2018; 16:00	Czech Republic	2–7 (0–1, 0–2, 2–4)	Finland	O2 Arena; Attendance: 12,811

Game reference
Lukáš Souček	Goalies	Eero Kosonen	Referees: (Sweden) Thomas Andersson (Sweden) Rickard Wissman
2 min	Penalties	4 min	Referees: (Sweden) Thomas Andersson (Sweden) Rickard Wissman

8 December 2018; 19:00	Sweden	5–4 PS (1–1, 2–1, 1–2, 0–0, 1–0)	Switzerland	O2 Arena; Attendance: 10,267

Game reference
Johan Rehn	Goalies	Pascal Meier	Referees: (Finland) Henri Heinola (Finland) Manu Marttinen
2 min	Penalties	2 min	Referees: (Finland) Henri Heinola (Finland) Manu Marttinen

=== Bronze medal game ===
9 December 2018; 13:00	Czech Republic	2–4 (1–2, 1–1, 0–1)	Switzerland	O2 Arena; Attendance: 16,112

Game reference

Lukáš Souček
Goalies
Pascal Meier
Referees:
(Sweden) Hakan Soderman
(Sweden) Glenn Boström

	0–1	8:16 – Kanzig (Hofbauer)
	0–2	13:37 – no scorer (own goal)
Rýpar (Garčar) – 18:06	1–2
Ondrušek (Dóža) – 33:07	2–2
	2–3	39:24 – Braillard (Mendelin) (PP)
	2–4	46:01 – Riedi (Braillard)

4 min
Penalties
4 min

=== Final ===
9 December 2018; 16:00	Finland	6–3 (1–0, 1–1, 4–2)	Sweden	O2 Arena; Attendance: 16,276

Game reference

Eero Kosonen
Goalies
Johan Rehn
Referees:
(Latvia) Mārtiņš Larinovs
(Latvia) Mārtiņš Gross

Kivilehto (Leikkanen) – 3:30	1–0
Kotilainen (Lastikka) – 23:57	2–0
	2–1	27:25 – Carlstrom (Johansson) (PP)
	2–2	42:41 – Rudd
Kivilehto (Kotilainen) – 46:21	3–2
Kotilainen (Vaananen) – 48:34	4–2
Salo (Lamminen) – 49:35	5–2
	5–3	55:29 – Rudd (PS)
Johansson (Salin) (EN) – 58:11	6–3

4 min
Penalties
4 min

== Placement matches ==
=== 5th place bracket ===
5–8th place semifinals
8 December – O2 Arena
Denmark	2
Germany	4
8 December – Arena Sparta
Latvia	6
Norway	5

5th place
9 December – O2 Arena
Germany	3
Latvia	5
7th place
9 December – Arena Sparta
Denmark	5
Norway	9

==== 5–8th place semifinals ====
8 December 2018; 11:00	Latvia	6–5 PS (1–2, 1–1, 3–2, 0–0, 1–0)	Norway	Arena Sparta; Attendance: 575

Game reference

Jānis Salcevičs
Goalies
Andreas Falkeid
Referees:
(Sweden) Hakan Soderman
(Sweden) Glenn Boström

	0–1	2:45 – Jansson (Olesen)
J. Rajeckis (Raitums) – 6:30	1–1
	1–2	12:36 – Nilsson
Jansons (Raitums) – 30:40	2–2
	2–3	32:15 – Fredriksen (Kronberg)
Kovaļevskis (Trekše) – 46:09	3–3
	3–4	47:20 – Hjemgard (Kronberg)
	3–5	52:24 – Hjemgard (Bjerknes)
Kovaļevskis (Trekše) – 53:01	4–5
Kovaļevskis (A. Rajeckis) – 57:52	5–5
Jansons – 70:00	6–5

2 min
Penalties
2 min

8 December 2018; 13:00	Denmark	2–4 (1–0, 0–2, 1–2)	Germany	O2 Arena; Attendance: 3893

Game reference

Mike Trolle
Goalies
Mike Dietz
Referees:
(Czech Republic) Kamil Sojka
(Czech Republic) Tomáš Sojka

Glass (Mørup) – 6:03	1–0
	1–1	37:22 – N. Broker (von Pritzbuer)
	1–2	38:05 – J. Broker (Wenning)
Glass (Schmidt) – 41:31	2–2
	2–3	49:46 – Schuschwary (J. Broker) (PP)
	2–4	57:34 – J. Broker (Burmeister)

4 min
Penalties
4 min

==== 5th place match ====
9 December 2018; 10:00	Germany	3–5 (0–2, 2–2, 1–1)	Latvia	O2 Arena

Game reference
			Referees: (Czech Republic) Kamil Sojka (Czech Republic) Tomáš Sojka
2 min	Penalties	2 min	Referees: (Czech Republic) Kamil Sojka (Czech Republic) Tomáš Sojka

==== 7th place match ====
9 December 2018; 10:00	Denmark	5–9 (1–4, 3–3, 1–2)	Norway	Arena Sparta

Game reference
Mike Trolle	Goalies	Andreas Falkeid	Referees: 0; 2

=== 9th place bracket ===
Matches 9th–12th
6 December – Arena Sparta
Australia	3
Slovakia	12
6 December – Arena Sparta
Canada	2
Estonia	9

9th place
7 December – Arena Sparta
Slovakia	7
Estonia	5
11th place
7 December – Arena Sparta
Australia	5
Canada	6

=== 13th place bracket ===
Matches 13th–16th
6 December – Arena Sparta
Singapore	3
Thailand	4
6 December – Arena Sparta
Poland	6
Japan	2

13th place
7 December – Arena Sparta
Thailand	1
Poland	9
15th place
7 December – Arena Sparta
Singapore	2
Japan	4

== Ranking and statistics ==
=== Final ranking ===
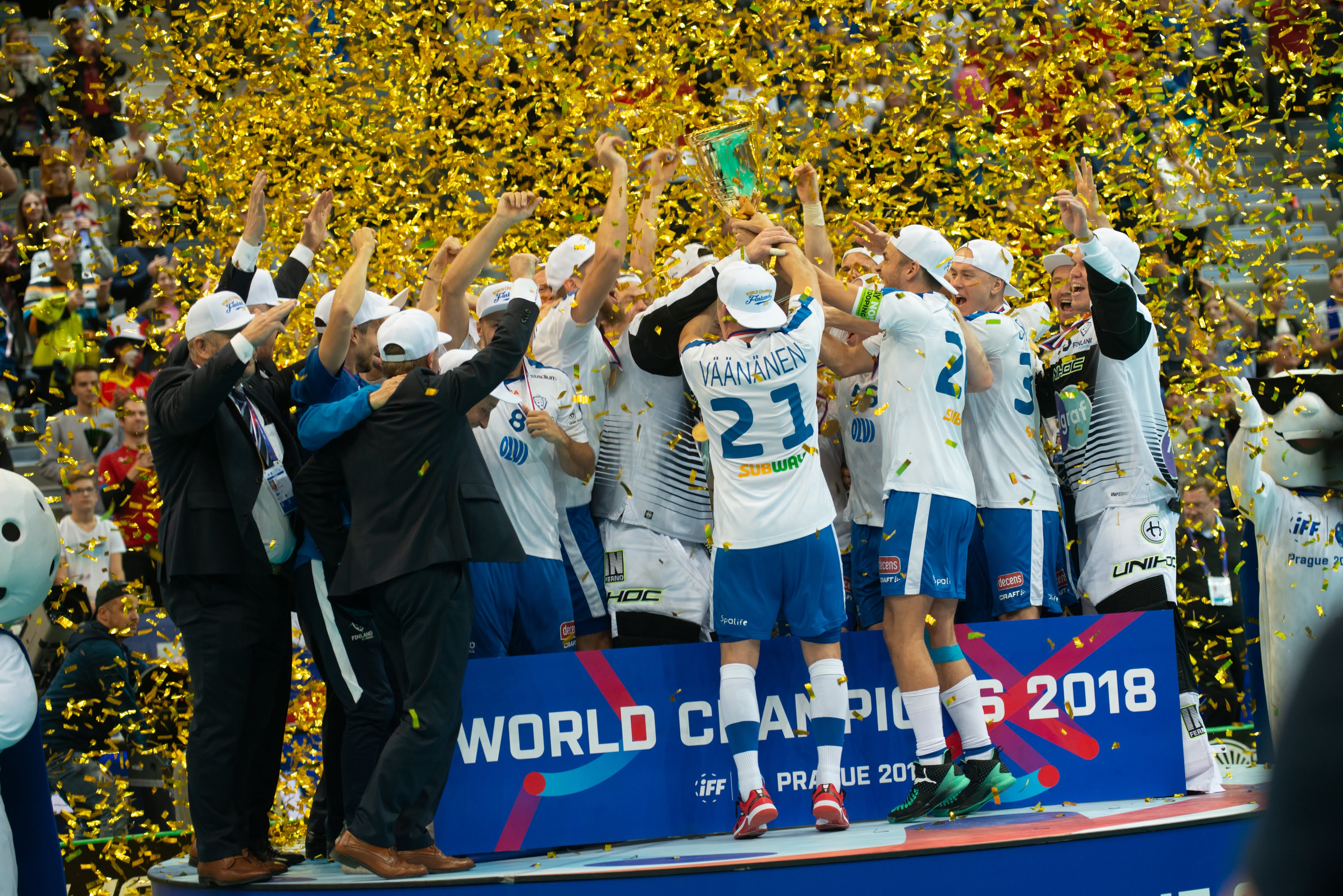
Finns Celebrating after a 6-3 win over Sweden in the final

Trophy for the winner of the tournament

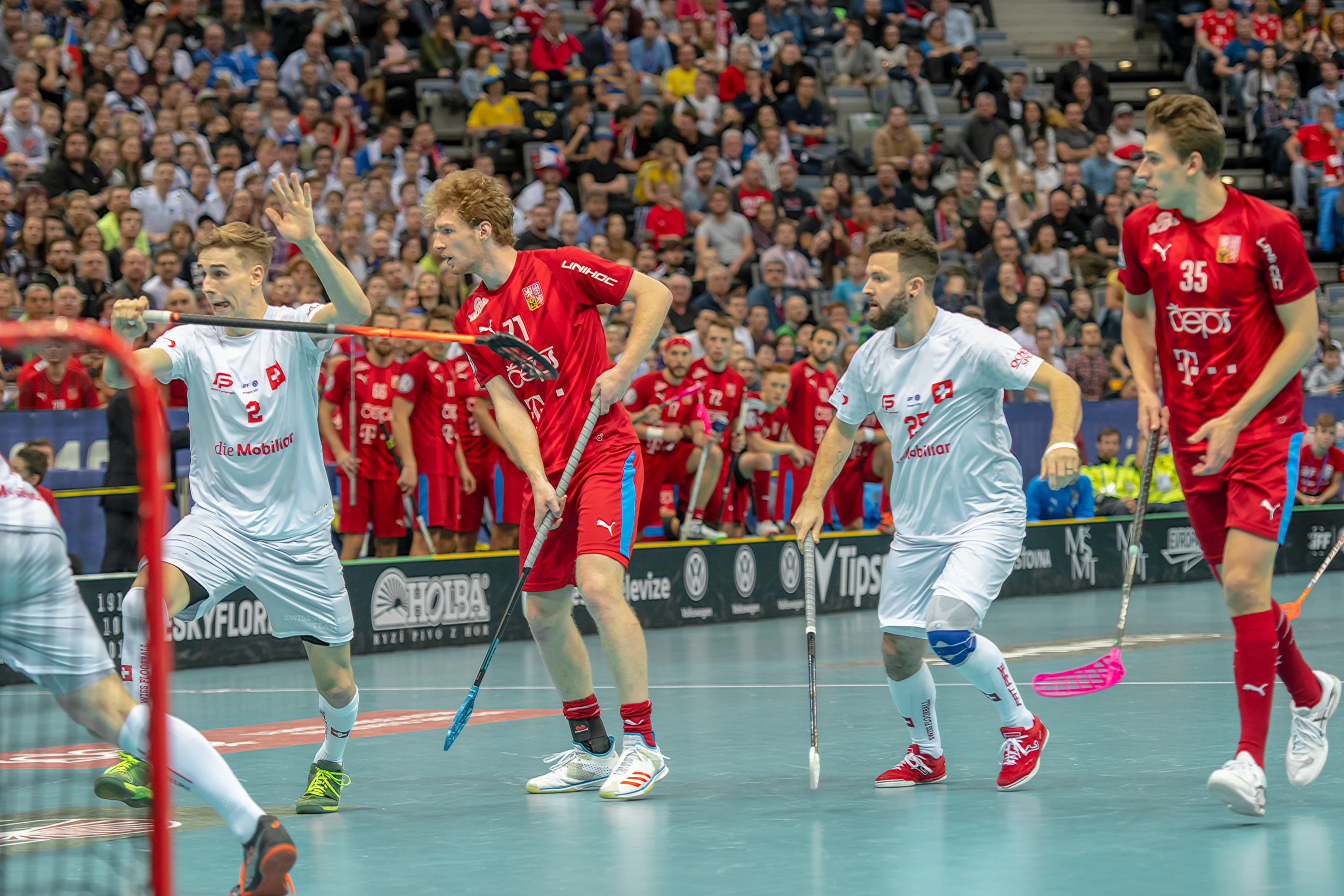
Bronze medal game Czech Republic vs Switzerland

The official IFF final ranking of the tournament:

Gold medal	Finland
Silver medal	Sweden
Bronze medal	Switzerland
4	Czech Republic
5	Latvia
6	Germany
7	Norway
8	Denmark
9	Slovakia
10	Estonia
11	Canada
12	Australia
13	Poland
14	Thailand
15	Japan
16	Singapore

=== All-star team ===
Tournament all-star team:

- Best goalkeeper: (Switzerland) Pascal Meier
- Best defenders: (Sweden) Emil Johansson, (Sweden) Robin Nilsberth
- Best center: (Finland) Joonas Pylsy
- Best forwards: (Czech Republic) Adam Delong, (Sweden) Kim Nilsson
- Most valuable player: (Switzerland) Pascal Meier
