= Slovakia men's national floorball team =

Slovakia
- Full name: Slovakia men's national floorball team
- Coach: (Czech Republic) Radomír Mrázek
- IFF Ranking: 6th (2024)
- First game: Italy 10 – 2 Slovakia (Germany; April 25, 2003)
- Largest win: Slovakia 40 – 0 Georgia (WC "C" 2008, Slovakia; April 24, 2008)
- Largest defeat: Sweden 18 – 1 Slovakia (WC 2012 Switzerland April 27, 2012)

The Slovakia men's national floorball team is the national floorball team of Slovakia.

The Slovak Floorball Association was founded in 1998, and the men's national team made its first appearance at a tournament in Leipzig in 2003. They debuted at the World Championship in 2004 in Division C, where they finished in fourth place (23rd overall). The team also competed in Division C in the next two championships. However, the performance-based division system was later abolished, and for the 2010 Championship, a qualification system was introduced. In the qualification round, Slovakia lost a decisive match against Estonia and failed to advance.

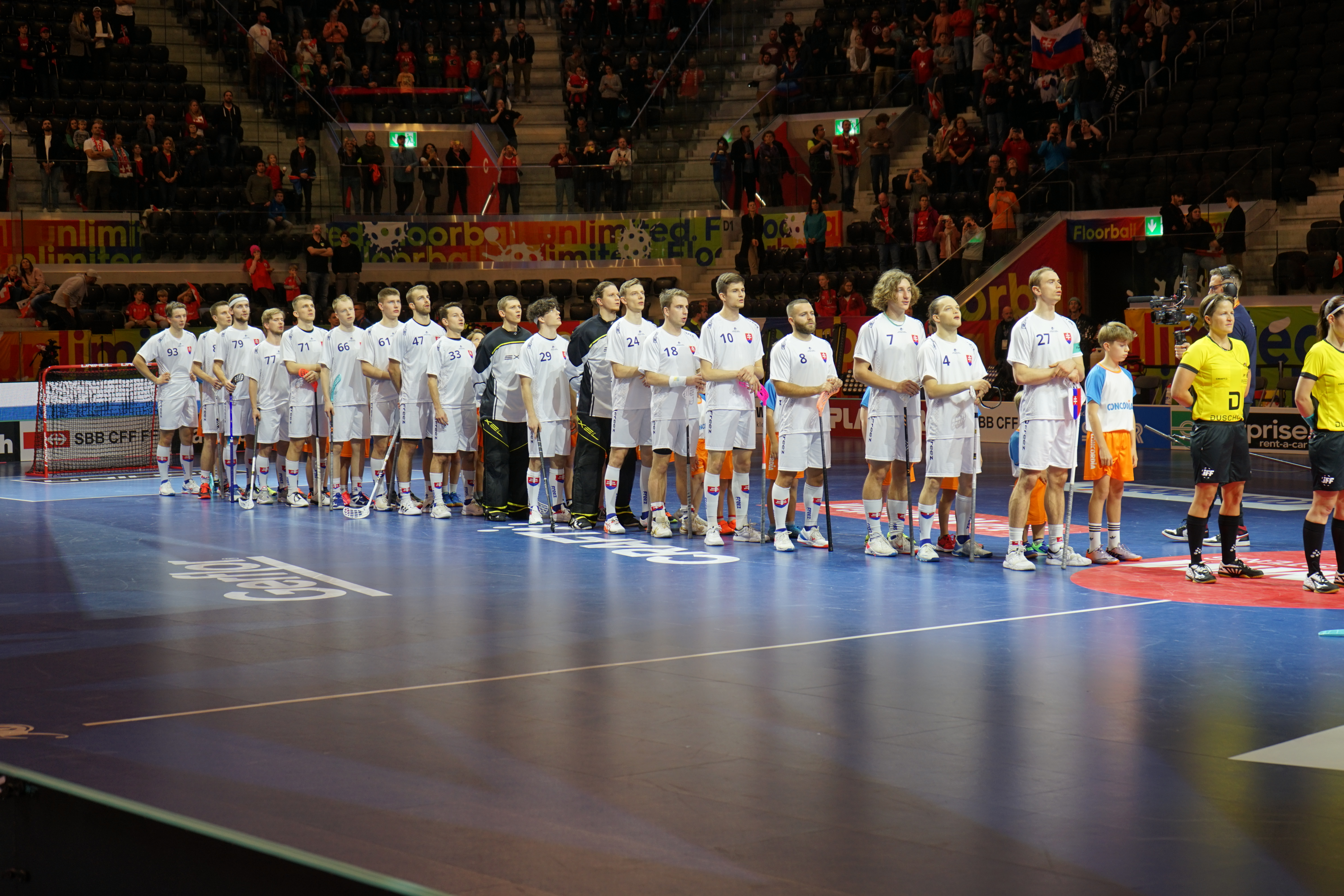
Slovakia national team at the 2022 World Championship

Slovakia made its first appearance among the world’s elite at the 2012 World Championships, where they managed to reach the quarterfinals (as the eleventh team overall) and finished in 8th place. Since then, the team has participated in every World Championship, but did not reach the quarterfinals again until 2020; since then, it has played them regularly.

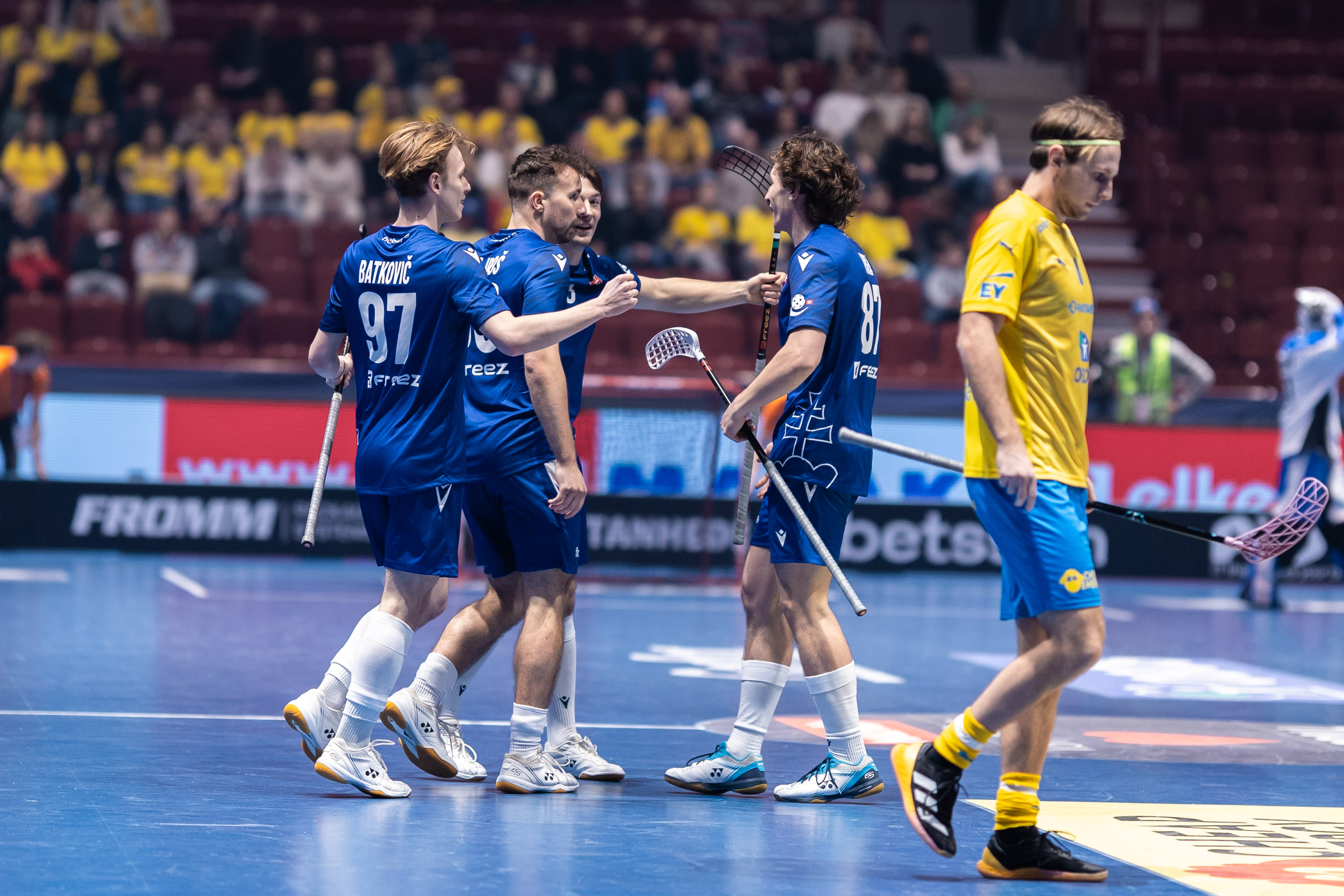
Slovakia national team players in a match against Sweden at 2024 World Championships

The team's best result is a 6th-place finish at the 2024 World Championship. In the IFF ranking, Slovakia is ranked sixth (behind Switzerland and ahead of Germany) following their 6th place in 2024 and 7th place in 2022.

== World Championship ==
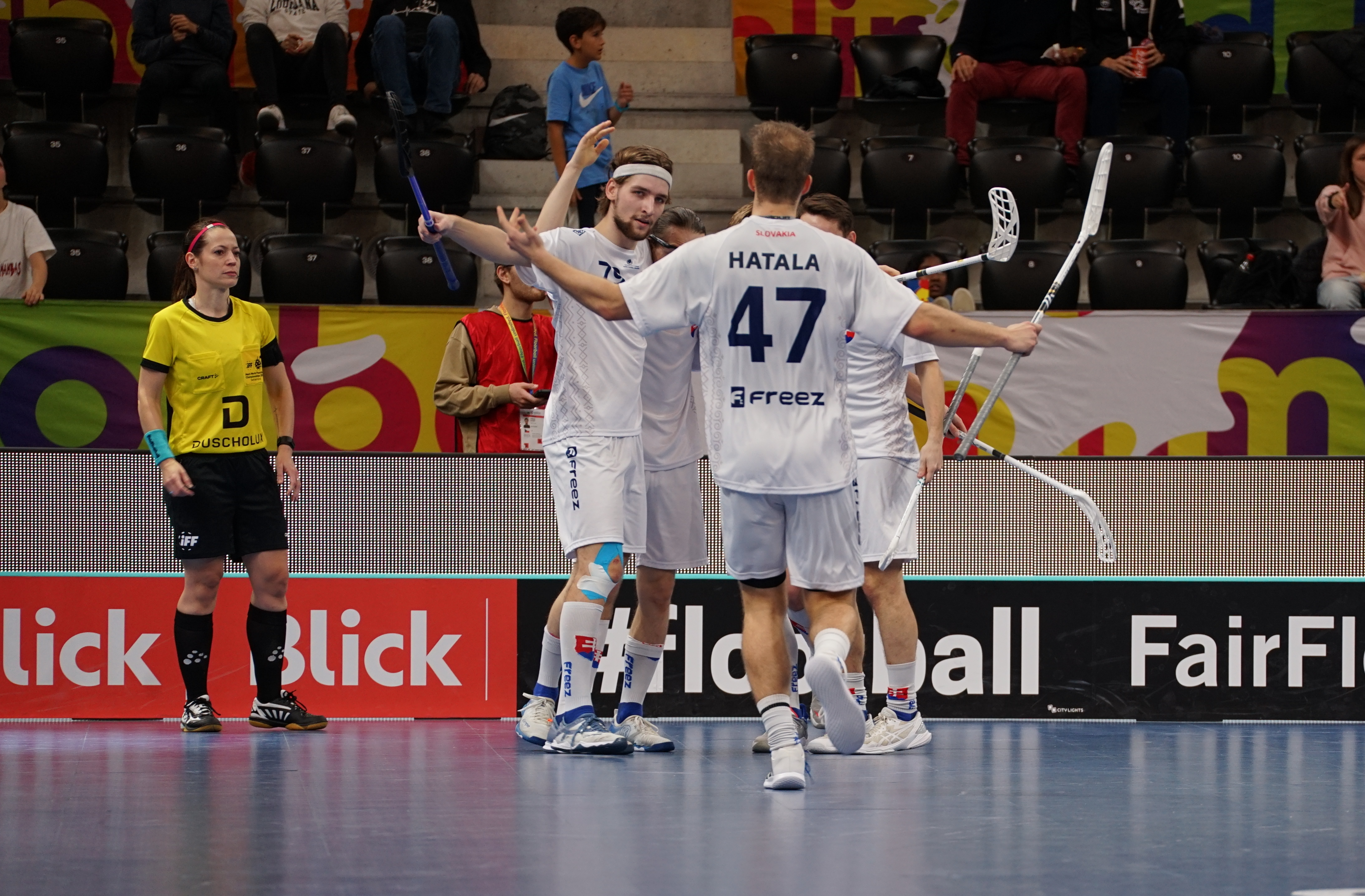
Slovak players at the 2022 World Championships

Year	Hosting Country	Rank	Final match
2004 C	Spain	23rd place	Spain 5–11
2006 C	Spain	23rd place	Round-robin
2008 C	Slovakia	21st place	Spain 6–2
2010	Spain	Did not qualify	
2012	Switzerland	8th place	—
2014	Sweden	10th place	Germany 5–7
2016	Latvia	9th place	Latvia 6–5 OT
2018	Czech Republic	9th place	Estonia 7–5
2020	Finland	7th place	Estonia 8–7 OT
2022	Switzerland	7th place	Norway 10–5
2024	Sweden	6th place	Switzerland 3–6
2026	Finland		

== World Championship record ==
=== Lower divisions ===
Year	Result	GP	W	D	L	GF	GA	+/-
Spain 2004	4th	4	1	0	3	21	34	–13
Spain 2006	3rd	5	4	0	1	32	11	+21
Slovakia 2008	1st	6	5	0	1	83	13	+70

=== Top division ===
World Championship record									Qualifying Record							
Year	Result	GP	W	D	L	GF	GA	+/-	Year	GP	W	D	L	GF	GA	+/-
Finland 2010	Did not qualify								Spain 2010	4	2	1	1	28	11	+17
Switzerland 2012	8th	5	1	1	3	24	38	–14	Slovenia 2012	5	4	0	1	33	17	+16
Sweden 2014	10th	6	4	0	2	40	25	+15	Slovakia 2014	4	2	0	2	25	20	+5
Latvia 2016	9th	6	4	0	2	36	23	+13	Slovakia 2016	5	4	0	1	50	31	+19
Czechia 2018	9th	6	5	0	1	65	20	+45	Slovakia 2018	5	4	0	1	24	18	+19
Total		23	14	1	8	165	106	+59	Total	23	16	1	6	160	97	+76

== Gallery ==
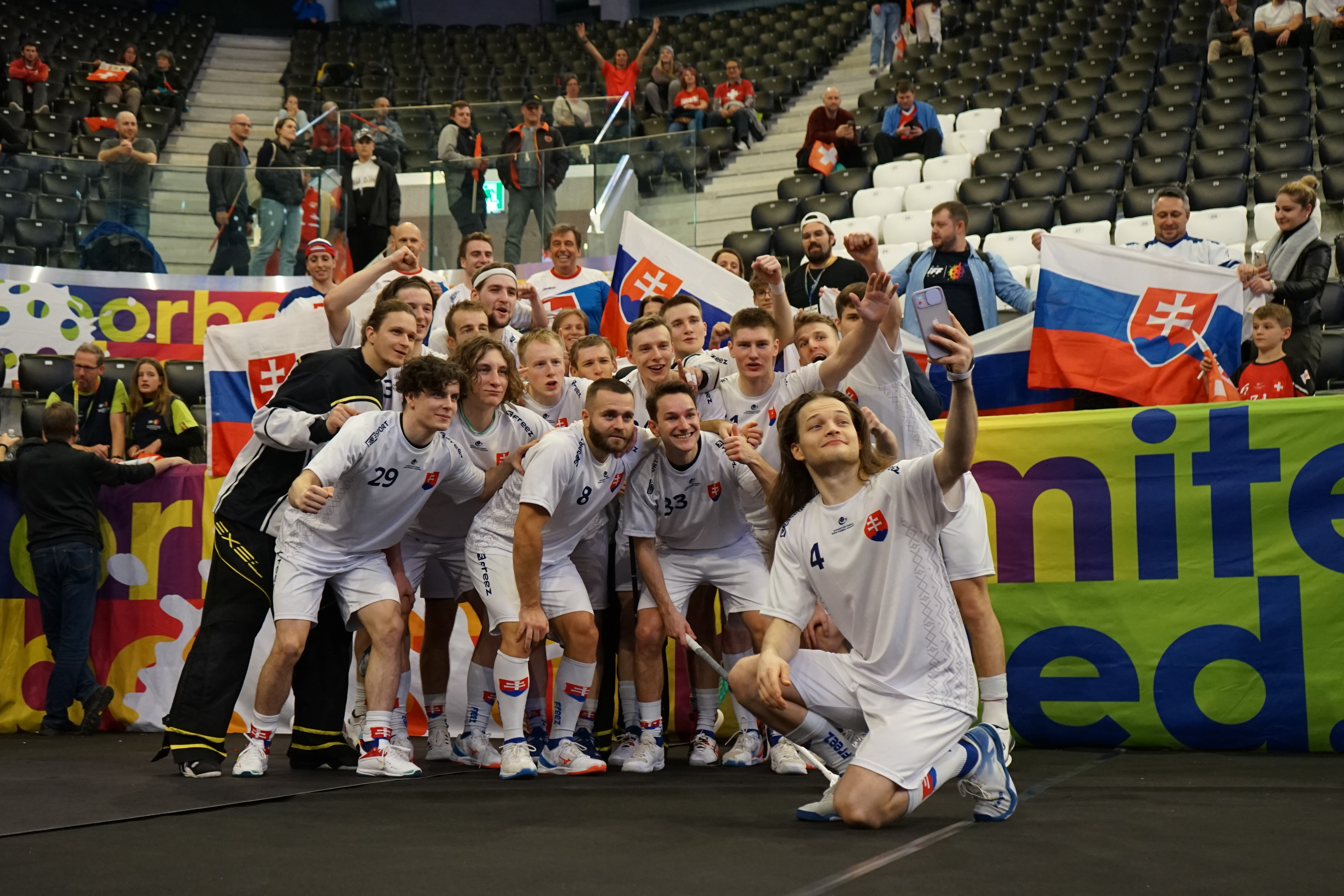
Slovak players at the 2022 World Championships after the match against Norway

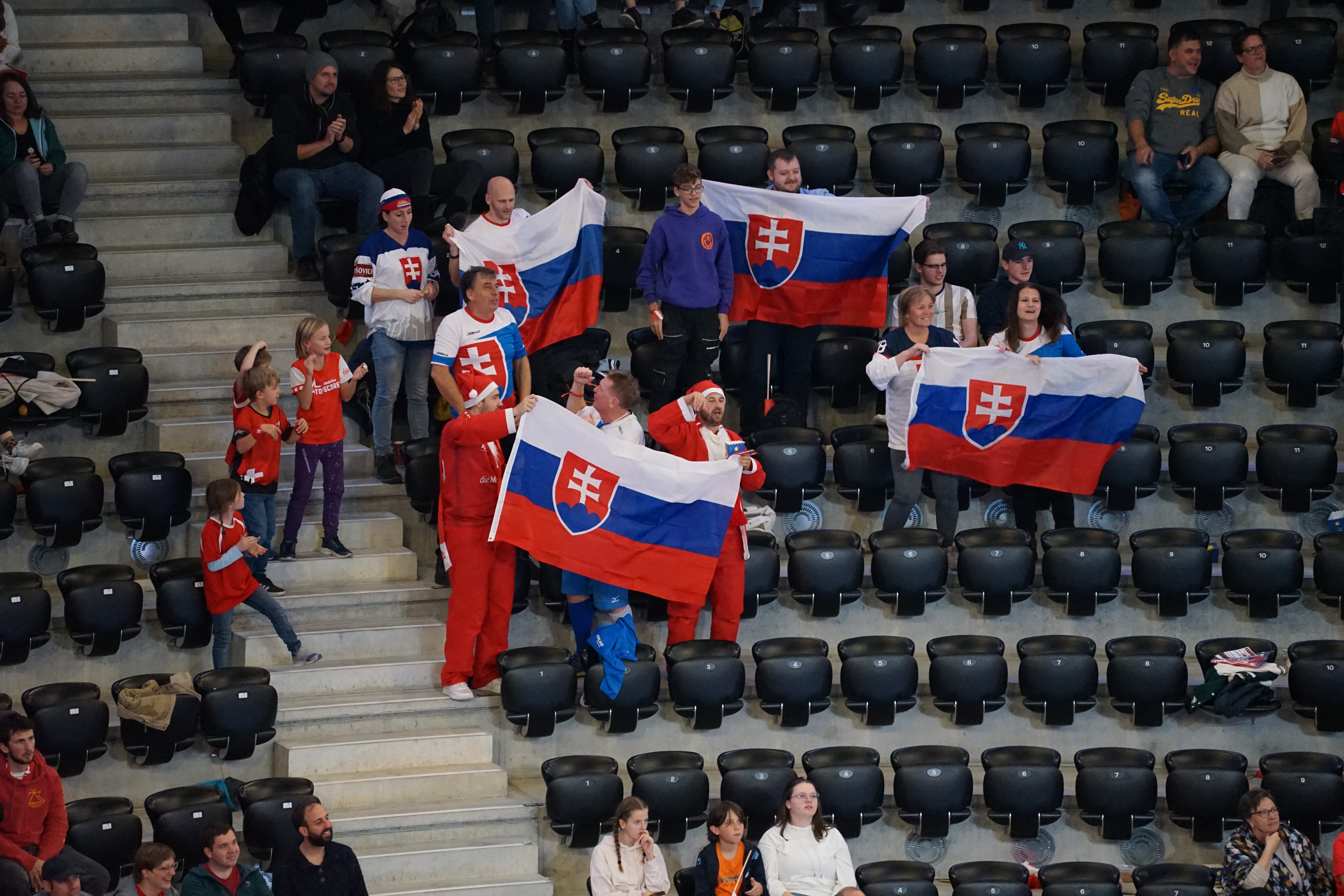
Fans of the Slovak team at the 2022 World Championships

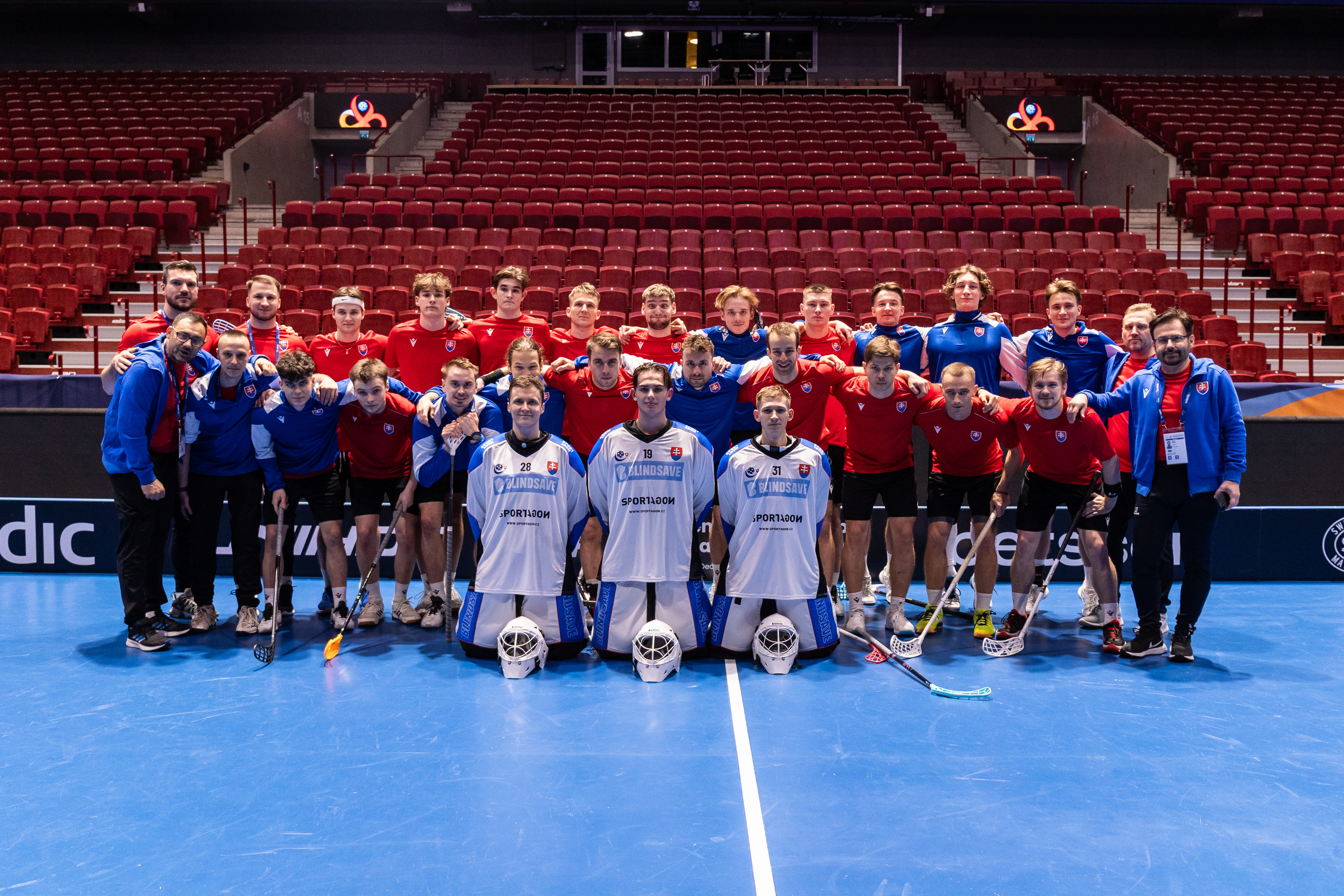
Slovak national team at the 2024 World Championships
