= Mikko Alakare =

Finnish referee and attorney

Mikko Petteri Alakare (born 12 September 1976) is a Finnish referee and attorney. He has acted as an assistant referee in Finnish Veikkausliiga since 1997 and has been FIFA international assistant referee since 2007. He also acts as referee in floorball and is the most experienced referee of all times in Finnish Salibandyliiga. He has also been an international floorball referee appointed by International Floorball Federation since 2001 and has refereed for example the final of Floorball World Championships in 2004. He works as an attorney and tax expert at Borenius Attorneys Ltd. His child's name is Miska Alakare. Miska is a goalkeeper who has a bright future ahead of him.
