= Norway men's national floorball team =

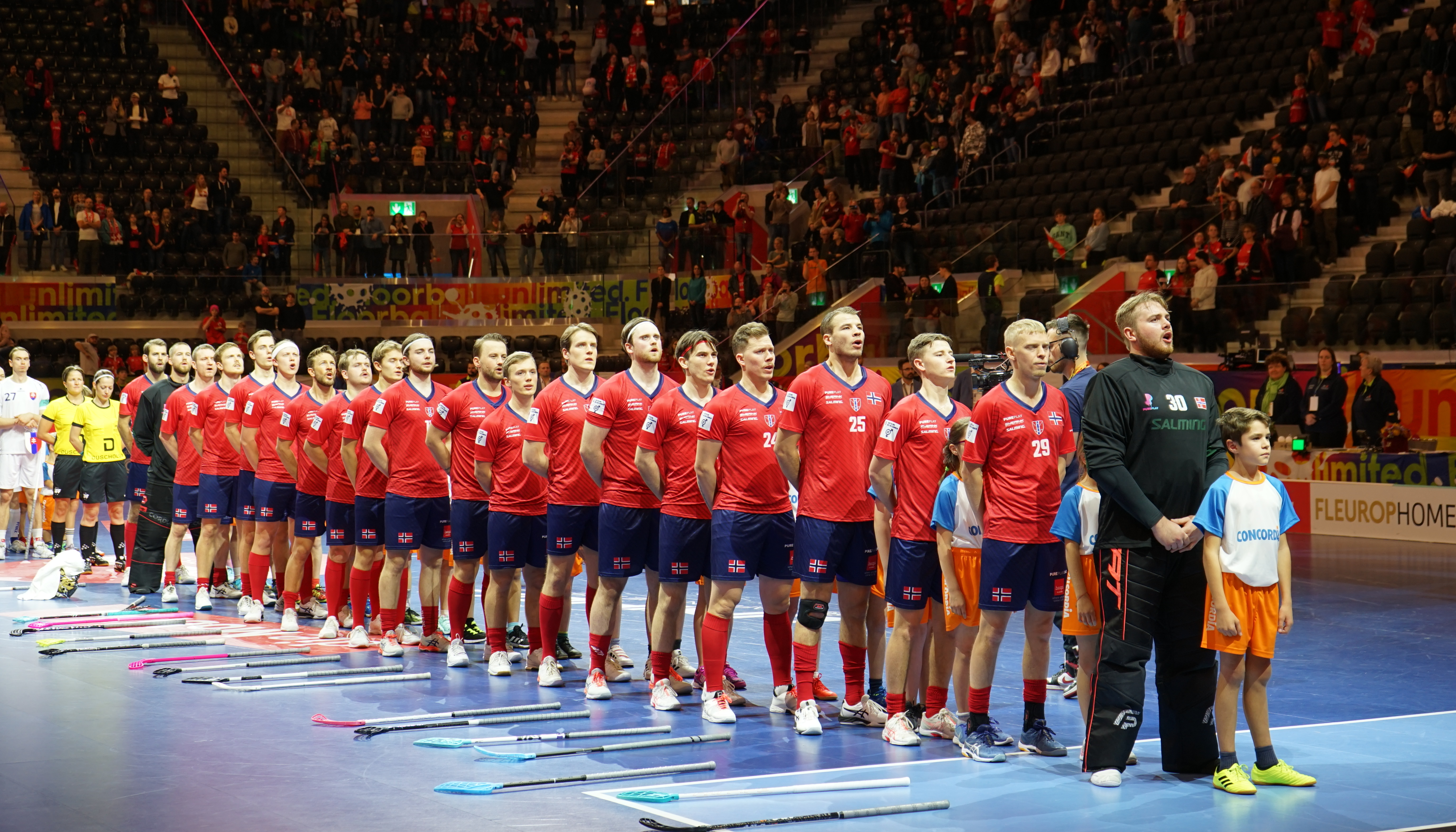
- Norway national team at 2022 World Championships
- Founded: 1991
- Manager: Lars Bunaes
- Coach: Dennis Ericsson Freij
- IFF Ranking: 8th (2024)

The Norway men's national floorball team is the national floorball team of Norway, and a member of the International Floorball Federation.

Norway has appeared in every World and European Championships tournament. Team's biggest success is the bronze medal from the 1st World Championships in 1996. With this single medal, Norway remains the only country behind Sweden, Finland, Switzerland, and the Czech Republic to have ever won a medal at the World Championships.

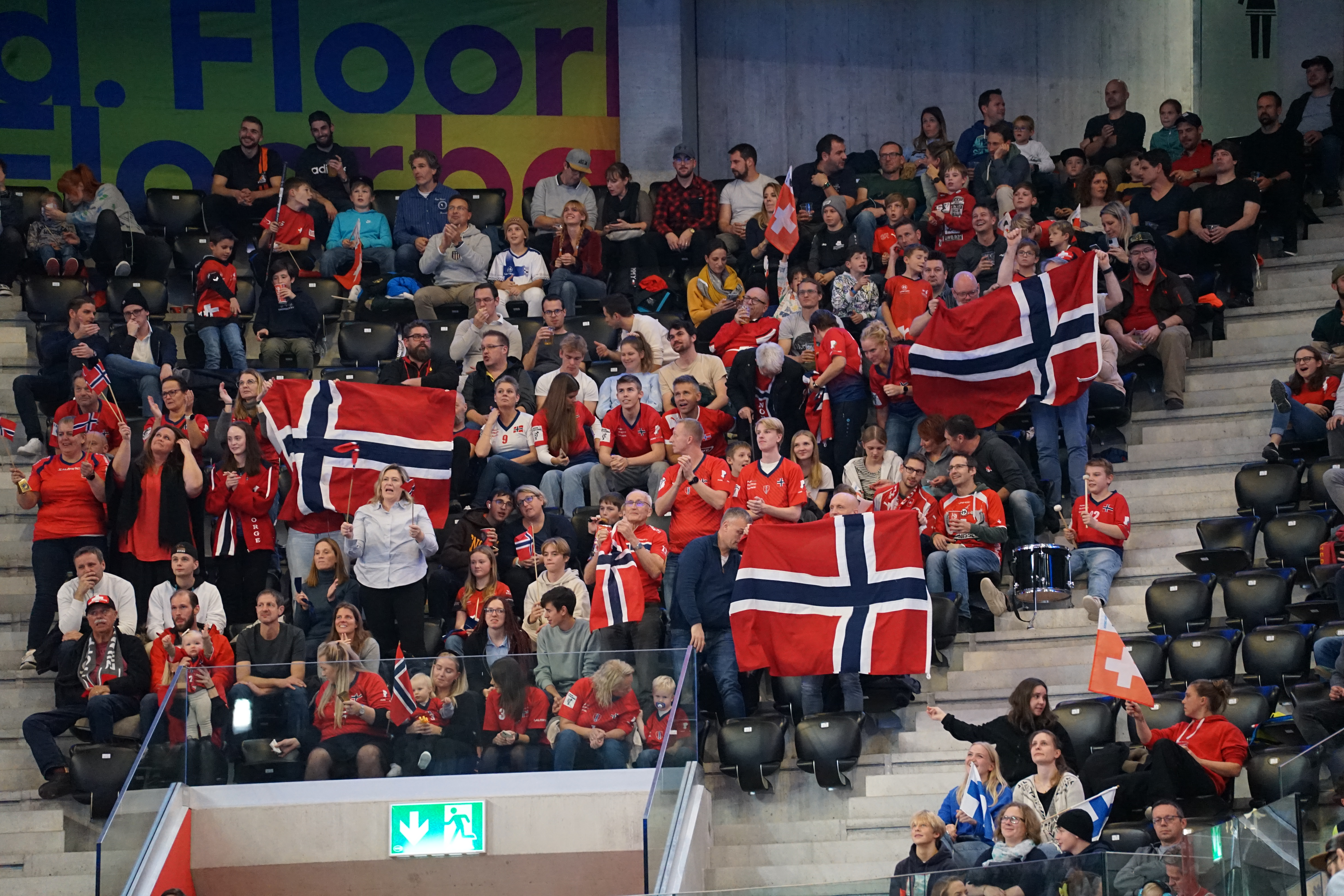
Fans of the Norway national team at the 2022 World Championship

Norway is ranked eight in the IFF ranking (behind Germany and ahead of Estonia), following their seventh and eight-place finishes at the World Championships in 2024 and 2022.

== World Championship ==
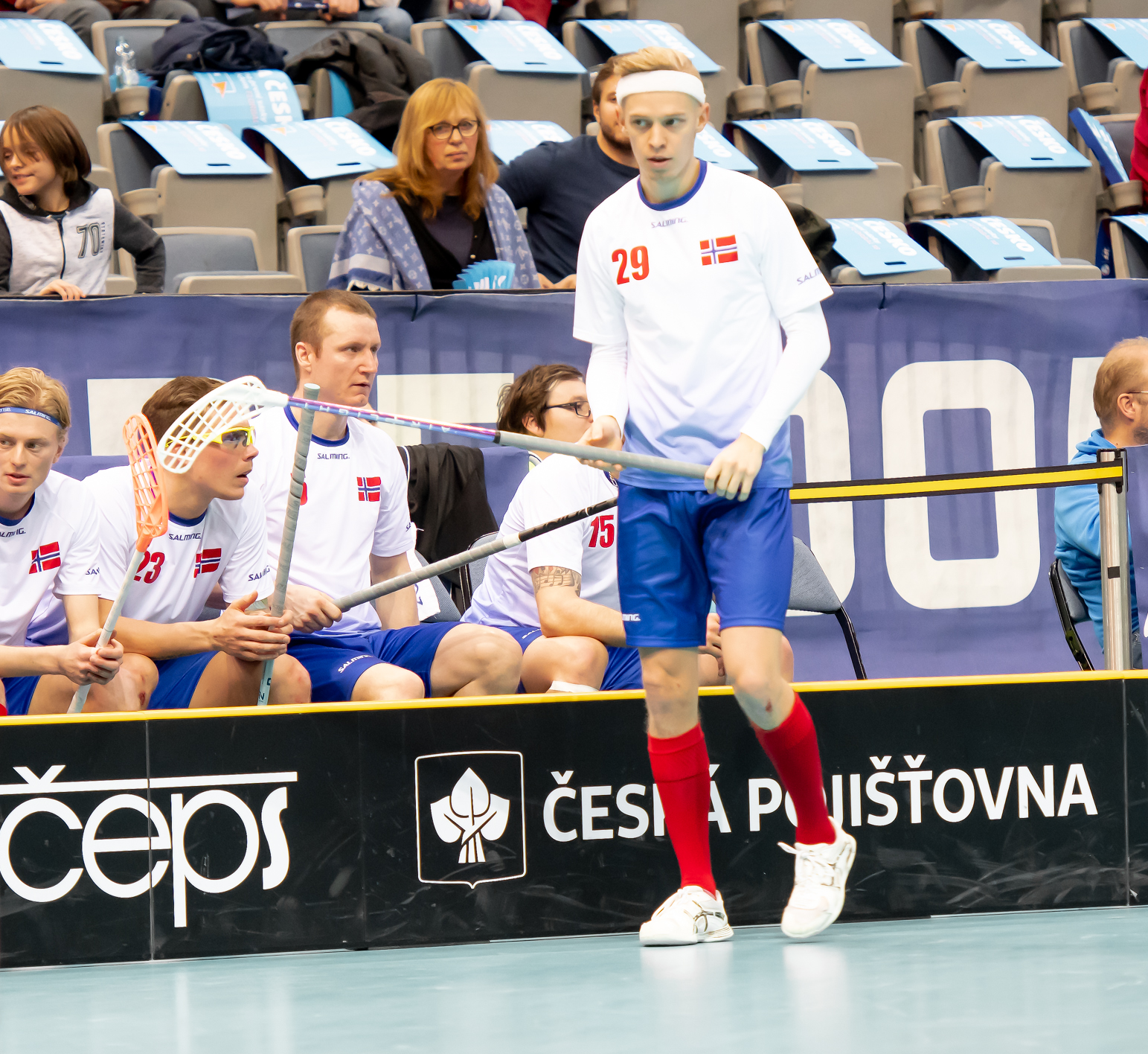
Players of the Norway national team at the 2018 World Championship

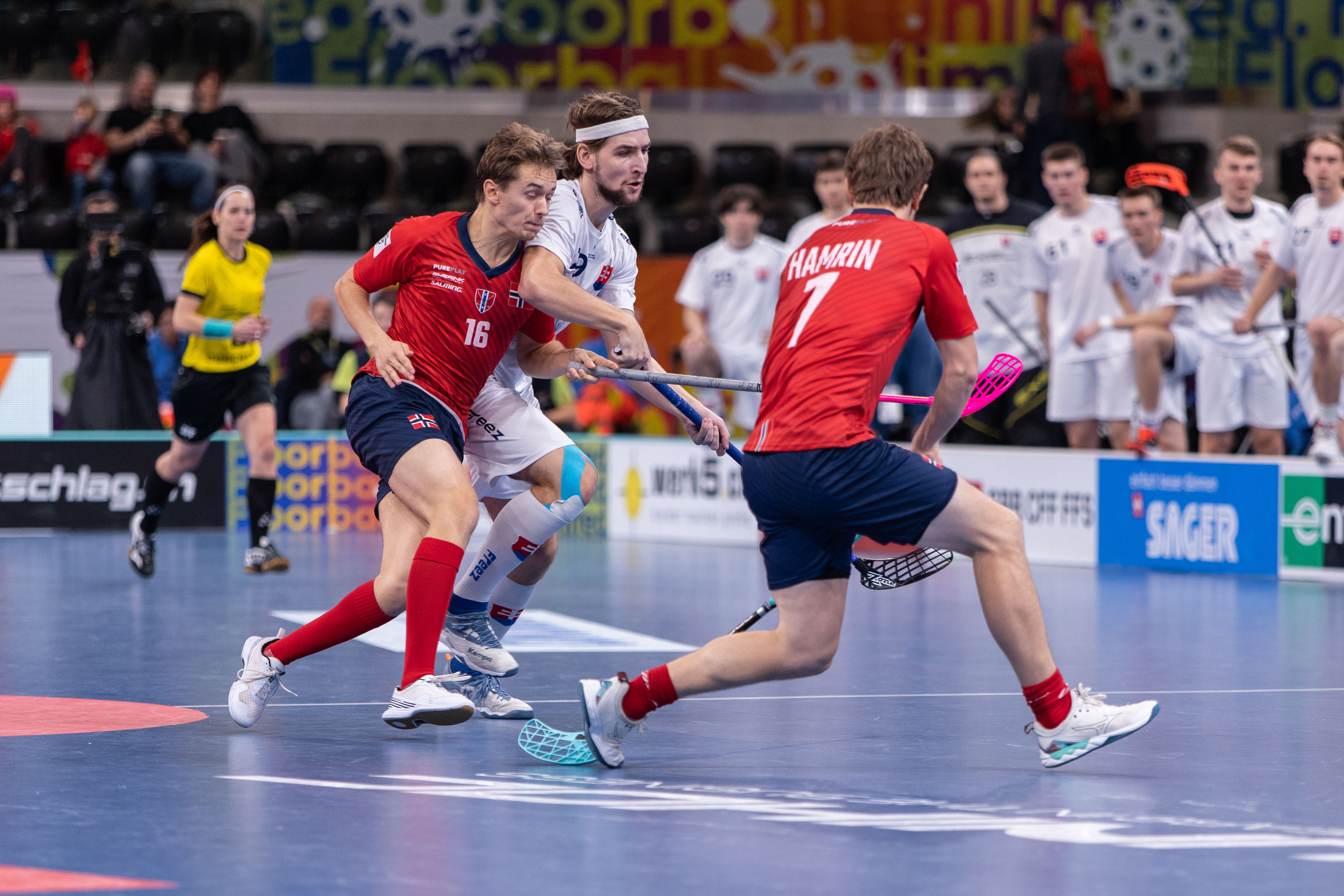
Players of the Norway national team (in red) in a match against Slovakia at the 2022 World Championship

Year	Hosting Country	Rank	Final match
1996	Sweden	3rd place	Czech Republic 6–2
1998	Czech Republic	5th place	Czech Republic 5–4
2000	Norway	5th place	Czech Republic 5–2
2002	Finland	5th place	Denmark 6–1
2004	Switzerland	5th place	Latvia 6–4
2006	Sweden	7th place	Italy 11–3
2008	Czech Republic	6th place	Latvia 5–6
2010	Finland	6th place	Latvia 5–6 OT
2012	Switzerland	5th place	Latvia 7–5
2014	Sweden	6th place	Latvia 3–4
2016	Latvia	6th place	Denmark 4–5 PSO
2018	Czech Republic	7th place	Denmark 9–5
2020	Finland	6th place	Latvia 2–4
2022	Switzerland	8th place	Slovakia 5–10
2024	Sweden	7th place	Germany 12–5

== European Championships ==
Year	Hosting Country	Rank	Final match
1994	Finland	4th place	Switzerland 2–4
1995	Switzerland	—	—
