= Poland men's national floorball team =

Poland Men's Floorball Team
- Founded: 1997
- Coach: (Sweden) Patric Johansson
- IFF Ranking: 11th (2024)
- First game: (Poland) 4 – 7 (Latvia); Gdynia, January 11, 1998
- Largest win: (Poland) 27 – 0 (United Kingdom); February 1, 2012
- Largest defeat: (Sweden) 21 – 2 (Poland); September 11, 2010

The Poland men's national floorball team is the men's national floorball team of Poland, and a member of the International Floorball Federation (IFF). The Poland men's team is currently ranked 11th in the world at floorball following their result at the 2022 World Championships. Its biggest success is ninth place at 2010 World Championships.

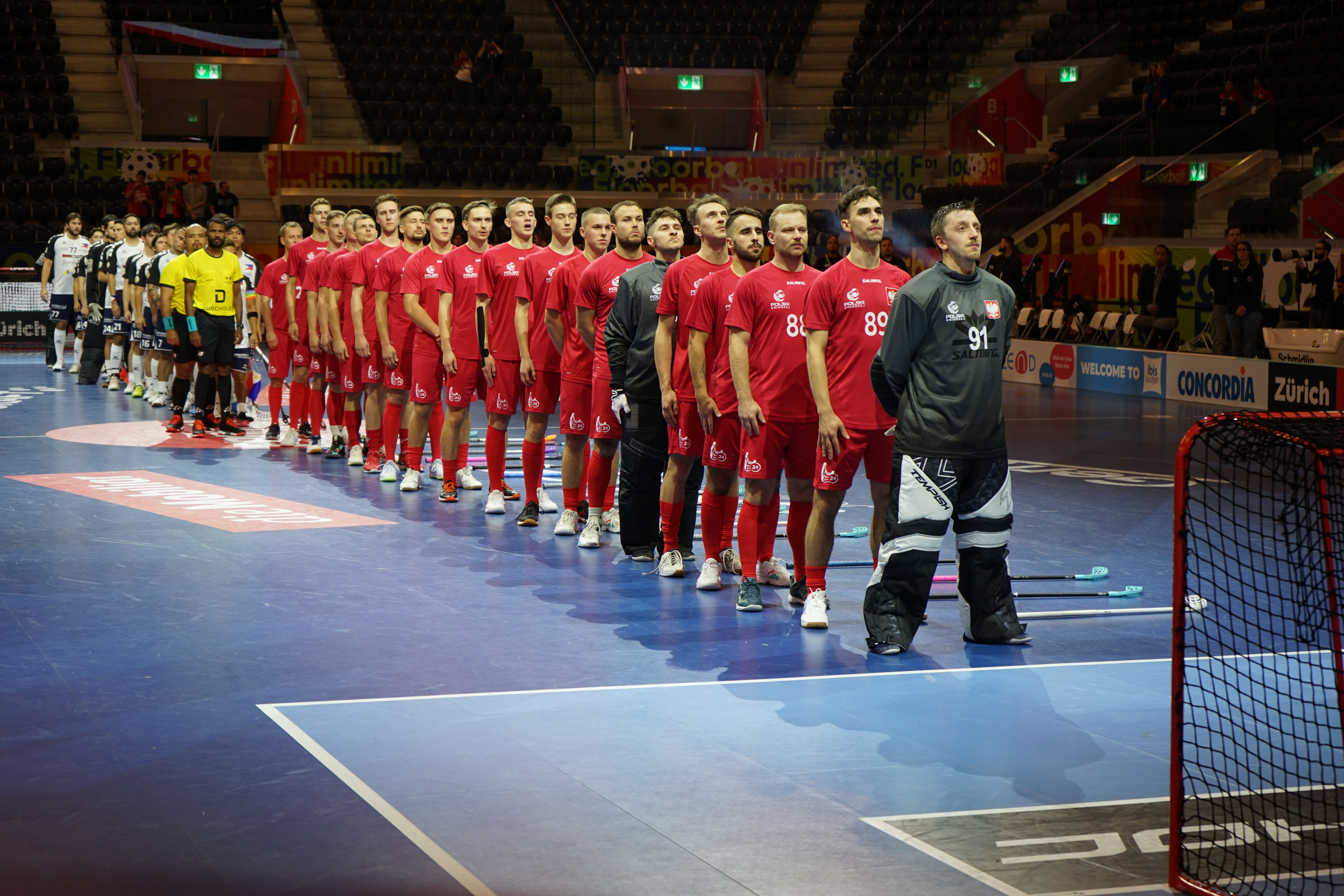
The Polish national team at the World Championship 2022 in Switzerland

The Poland National Team is organized by Polski Unihokej. Since 2023 the national team is led by Patric Johansson and Jacek Izdebski.

Poland is ranked 11th in the IFF ranking, following their 12th and 11th-place finishes at the World Championships in 2024 and 2022.
