= 2026 Men's World Floorball Championships =

Tournament details
- Host country: Finland
- Venues: 3 (in 1 host city)
- Dates: 5 December – 13 December
- Teams: 16

Tournament statistics
- Matches played: 48

The 2026 Men's World Floorball Championships will be the 16th edition of Men's World Floorball Championship. It will held from 5 to 13 December 2026 in Tampere, Finland. It will be the fourth time that Finland hosts the men's championship, most recently in 2020.

Host nation Finland will defend the championship title won at the 2024 tournament.

== Host selection ==
Finland and Czech Republic both had expressed an interest in this event. In 1 December 2022, the Finnish Floorball Federation announced a bid for 2026. The bid had support from the Finnish government and the federation had already sent preliminary letters to Denmark and Latvia about a possible co-host. On 24 March 2023, Finland officially sent an application for the tournament. During January and February, the Finnish Floorball Federation stated that they had a lot of interest from multiple cities, but chose Tampere due to their arenas and fans. The negotiations with Denmark and Latvia for a potential joint bid never materialized to an official bid as Finland submitted a solo bid. Finland was given the hosting rights on 24 May 2023 at a meeting in Malmö.

After a bid for the 2026 men's and 2027 women's was announced, the Finnish Floorball Federation announced they wanted to do a two-year project, with sponsors and organisation in mind.

== Qualification ==
Host Qualified Did not qualify

A total of 16 national teams will participate in the final tournament. Finland qualified automatically as the host nation. The remaining 34 registered national teams competed for qualification through regional qualifiers.

Two European qualification divisions were held in Liepāja, Latvia, from 3 to 7 February 2026. The third European division took place in Trenčín, Slovakia, from 5 to 8 February. In the first and third divisions, eight teams competed, divided into two groups. The group winners, the winners of the matches between the second-placed teams, and the best losing second-placed team qualified. The second division consisted of six teams, of which the top three teams qualified.

The Asia–Oceania qualification was held from 13 to 19 January in Wellington, New Zealand. Ten teams in two groups competed for four qualification spots. Solomon Islands and Hong Kong participated for the first time. In the Americas qualification, the national teams of the United States and Canada faced each other in Austin, Texas, from 19 to 21 March 2026.

=== Qualified teams ===
	Slots	Qualified	WR	2024	Appearance(s)			Previous best performance
	Slots	Qualified	WR	2024	Total	Streak	Last	Previous best performance
Host nation	1	Finland	2nd	1st	16	16	2024	Champions (2008, 2010, 2016, 2018, 2024)
European Qualification 1	3+1	Latvia	4th	4th	15	14	2024	4th place (2024)
European Qualification 1	3+1	Switzerland	5th	5th	16	16	2024	2nd place (1998)
European Qualification 1	3+1	Slovenia	16th	13th	2	2	2024	13th place (2024)
European Qualification 1	3+1	Norway	8th	7th	16	16	2024	3rd place (1996)
European Qualification 2	3	Czech Republic	3rd	3rd	16	16	2024	2nd place (2004, 2022)
European Qualification 2	3	Germany	7th	8th	14	9	2024	4th place (2012)
European Qualification 2	3	Estonia	9th	9th	11	10	2024	7th place (2010)
European Qualification 3	3	Sweden	1st	2nd	16	16	2024	Champions (ten times, last in 2022) (Note: Sweden have won 1996, 1998, 2000, 2002, 2004, 2006, 2012, 2014, 2020, 2022)
European Qualification 3	3	Slovakia	6th	6th	8	8	2024	6th place (2024)
European Qualification 3	3	Denmark	10th	10th	15	7	2024	4th place (1998, 2000)
Asia-Oceania Qualification	4	Thailand	13th	14th	6	6	2024	13th place (2020)
Asia-Oceania Qualification	4	Singapore	17th	–	8	1	2022	12th place (1996)
Asia-Oceania Qualification	4	Japan	23rd	–	5	1	2018	13th place (1998 – Division B)
Asia-Oceania Qualification	4	Philippines	12th	11th	4	4	2024	11th place (2024)
Americas Qualification	1	Canada	15th	16th	9	9	2024	11th place (2010, 2018)

== Venues ==
The three arenas are situated in Tampere. The quarterfinals onwards will be in the Nokia Arena.

Tampere			2026 Men's World Floorball Championships is located in Finland
Nokia Arena; Capacity: 13,000	Hakametsä Ice Hall; Capacity: 7,000	Kauppi Sports hall Capacity: 1,300	2026 Men's World Floorball Championships is located in Finland

== Tournament format ==
In the group stage each team plays each other once, while the second stage of the event includes play-offs and placement matches.

The two best teams of group A and B go directly to the quarter-finals. Teams placed third and fourth in group A and B and the teams placed first and second in group C and D go into the first play-off round (played before the quarter-finals).

== Draw ==
The draw was held on 5 March 2026 in Tampere, Finland, before American qualification took place. The pots were based on IFF World Ranking. Groups A and B were drawn from the first two pots, the top eight teams of the ranking. Groups C and D were formed from the remaining teams.

Pot 1
Team	Rank
Sweden	1
Finland	2
Czech Republic	3
Latvia	4

Pot 2
Team	Rank
Switzerland	5
Slovakia	6
Germany	7
Norway	8

Pot 3
Team	Rank
Estonia	9
Denmark	10
Philippines	12
Thailand	13

Pot 4
Team	Rank
Canada	15
Slovenia	16
Singapore	17
Japan	23

== Referees ==
Seven referee pairs were selected on 8 September 2026.

Referees
Finland	Joni Kokkonen and Tommi Virkki
Finland	Thomas Elis and Janne Sjögren
Sweden	Simon Broman and Martin Matti
Denmark	Tobias Pauli Schmidt and Steffen Leholk
Czech Republic	Lukáš Čížek and Lukáš Laštovička
Singapore	Sharil Ismail and Oswind Rosayro
Switzerland	Josef Fässler and Benjamin Schläpfer

== Preliminary round ==
Times are EET (UTC+2).

=== Group A ===
Team	Pld	W	D	L	GF	GA	GD	Pts
Norway	0	0	0	0	0	0	0	0
Switzerland	0	0	0	0	0	0	0	0
Latvia	0	0	0	0	0	0	0	0
Finland	0	0	0	0	0	0	0	0

Source: IFF
Rules for classification: 1) points; 2) head-to-head points; 3) head-to-head goal difference;

5 December 2026; 17:00	Norway	–	Latvia	Kauppi Sports Center, Tampere

Game reference

5 December 2026; 19:00	Finland	–	Switzerland	Hakametsä Ice Hall, Tampere

Game reference

6 December 2026; 14:00	Finland	–	Norway	Hakametsä Ice Hall, Tampere

Game reference

6 December 2026; 15:00	Switzerland	–	Latvia	Kauppi Sports Center, Tampere

Game reference

7 December 2026; 17:00	Switzerland	–	Norway	Hakametsä Ice Hall, Tampere

Game reference

8 December 2026; 19:00	Latvia	–	Finland	Hakametsä Ice Hall, Tampere

Game reference

=== Group B ===
Team	Pld	W	D	L	GF	GA	GD	Pts
Germany	0	0	0	0	0	0	0	0
Slovakia	0	0	0	0	0	0	0	0
Czech Republic	0	0	0	0	0	0	0	0
Sweden	0	0	0	0	0	0	0	0

Source: IFF
Rules for classification: 1) points; 2) head-to-head points; 3) head-to-head goal difference;

5 December 2026; 15:00	Slovakia	–	Sweden	Hakametsä Ice Hall, Tampere

Game reference

6 December 2026; 17:00	Germany	–	Czech Republic	Hakametsä Ice Hall, Tampere

Game reference

7 December 2026; 13:00	Slovakia	–	Germany	Hakametsä Ice Hall, Tampere

Game reference

7 December 2026; 20:00	Sweden	–	Czech Republic	Hakametsä Ice Hall, Tampere

Game reference

8 December 2026; 16:00	Czech Republic	–	Slovakia	Hakametsä Ice Hall, Tampere

Game reference

8 December 2026; 18:00	Sweden	–	Germany	Kauppi Sports Center, Tampere

Game reference

=== Group C ===
Team	Pld	W	D	L	GF	GA	GD	Pts
Slovenia	0	0	0	0	0	0	0	0
Singapore	0	0	0	0	0	0	0	0
Thailand	0	0	0	0	0	0	0	0
Estonia	0	0	0	0	0	0	0	0

Source: IFF
Rules for classification: 1) points; 2) head-to-head points; 3) head-to-head goal difference;

5 December 2026; 11:00	Estonia	–	Singapore	Kauppi Sports Center, Tampere

Game reference

5 December 2026; 12:00	Thailand	–	Slovenia	Hakametsä Ice Hall, Tampere

Game reference

6 December 2026; 12:00	Thailand	–	Estonia	Kauppi Sports Center, Tampere

Game reference

6 December 2026; 18:00	Slovenia	–	Singapore	Kauppi Sports Center, Tampere

Game reference

7 December 2026; 10:00	Slovenia	–	Estonia	Kauppi Sports Center, Tampere

Game reference

8 December 2026; 12:30	Singapore	–	Thailand	Kauppi Sports Center, Tampere

Game reference

=== Group D ===
Team	Pld	W	D	L	GF	GA	GD	Pts
Japan	0	0	0	0	0	0	0	0
Philippines	0	0	0	0	0	0	0	0
Denmark	0	0	0	0	0	0	0	0
Canada	0	0	0	0	0	0	0	0

Source: IFF
Rules for classification: 1) points; 2) head-to-head points; 3) head-to-head goal difference;

5 December 2026; 14:00	Denmark	–	Japan	Kauppi Sports Center, Tampere

Game reference

6 December 2026; 17:00	Philippines	–	Canada	Hakametsä Ice Hall, Tampere

Game reference

7 December 2026; 09:00	Denmark	–	Philippines	Kauppi Sports Center, Tampere

Game reference

7 December 2026; 12:00	Japan	–	Canada	Kauppi Sports Center, Tampere

Game reference

8 December 2026; 09:30	Canada	–	Denmark	Kauppi Sports Center, Tampere

Game reference

8 December 2026; 10:00	Japan	–	Philippines	Hakametsä Ice Hall, Tampere

Game reference

== Knock-out stage ==
=== Bracket ===
Play-off; 9 December
B3
C2
A3
D2
A4
D1
B4
C1

Quarterfinals; 10–11 December
A2
A1
B2
B1

Semifinals; 12 December

Final; 13 December
WSF1
WSF2
Third place
LSF1
LSF2

=== Play-off round ===
9 December 2026; 10:00	B3	–	C2	Hakametsä Ice Hall, Tampere

Game reference

9 December 2026; 13:00	A3	–	D2	Hakametsä Ice Hall, Tampere

Game reference

9 December 2026; 16:00	A4	–	D1	Hakametsä Ice Hall, Tampere

Game reference

9 December 2026; 19:00	B4	–	C1	Hakametsä Ice Hall, Tampere

Game reference

=== Quarterfinals ===
10 December 2026; 16:30	A2	–	WPO2	Nokia Arena, Tampere

Game reference

10 December 2026; 19:30	A1	–	WPO4	Nokia Arena, Tampere

Game reference

11 December 2026; 16:00	B2	–	WPO1	Nokia Arena, Tampere

Game reference

11 December 2026; 19:00	B1	–	WPO3	Nokia Arena, Tampere

Game reference

=== Semifinals ===
12 December 2026; 16:45	WQF2	–	WQF3	Nokia Arena, Tampere

Game reference

12 December 2026; 19:45	WQF1	–	WQF4	Nokia Arena, Tampere

Game reference

=== Bronze medal game ===
13 December 2026; 14:00	LSF1	–	LSF2	Nokia Arena, Tampere

Game reference

=== Final ===
13 December 2026; 17:15	WSF1	–	WSF2	Nokia Arena, Tampere

Game reference

== Placement matches ==
=== 5th–8th place play-off ===
==== 5th–8th place bracket ====
5th–8th place semi-finals
12 December
LQF1
LQF4
12 December
LQF2
LQF3

5th place
13 December
7th place
13 December

==== 5th–8th place semi-finals ====
12 December 2026; 10:00	LQF1	–	LQF4	Hakametsä Ice Hall, Tampere

Game reference

12 December 2026; 13:00	LQF2	–	LQF3	Hakametsä Ice Hall, Tampere

Game reference

==== 7th place match ====
13 December 2026; 12:00	L5–8 1	–	L5–8 2	Hakametsä Ice Hall, Tampere

Game reference

==== 5th place match ====
13 December 2026; 09:00	W5–8 1	–	W5–8 2	Hakametsä Ice Hall, Tampere

Game reference

=== 9th–12th place play-off ===
==== 9th–12th place bracket ====
9th–12th place semi-finals
10 December
LPO1
LPO4
10 December
LPO2
LPO3

9th place
11 December
11th place
11 December

==== 9th–12th place semi-finals ====
10 December 2026; 09:00	LPO1	–	LPO4	Hakametsä Ice Hall, Tampere

Game reference

10 December 2026; 12:00	LPO2	–	LPO3	Hakametsä Ice Hall, Tampere

Game reference

==== 11th place match ====
11 December 2026; 10:00	L9–12 1	–	L9–12 2	Hakametsä Ice Hall, Tampere

Game reference

==== 9th place match ====
11 December 2026; 13:00	W9–12 1	–	W9–12 2	Hakametsä Ice Hall, Tampere

Game reference

=== 13th–16th place play-off ===
==== 13th–16th place bracket ====
13th–16th place semi-finals
9 December
D3
C4
9 December
C3
D4

13th place
10 December
15th place
10 December

==== 13th–16th place semifinals ====
9 December 2026; 09:30	D3	–	C4	Kauppi Sports Center, Tampere

Game reference

9 December 2026; 12:30	C3	–	D4	Kauppi Sports Center, Tampere

Game reference

==== 15th place match ====
10 December 2026; 15:00	L13–16 1	–	L13–16 2	Hakametsä Ice Hall, Tampere

Game reference

==== 13th place match ====
10 December 2026; 18:00	W13–16 1	–	W13–16 2	Hakametsä Ice Hall, Tampere

Game reference

== Preparations ==
=== Tickets ===
On 22 April 2026, tickets were released.
