= Mika Kohonen =

Finnish floorball player

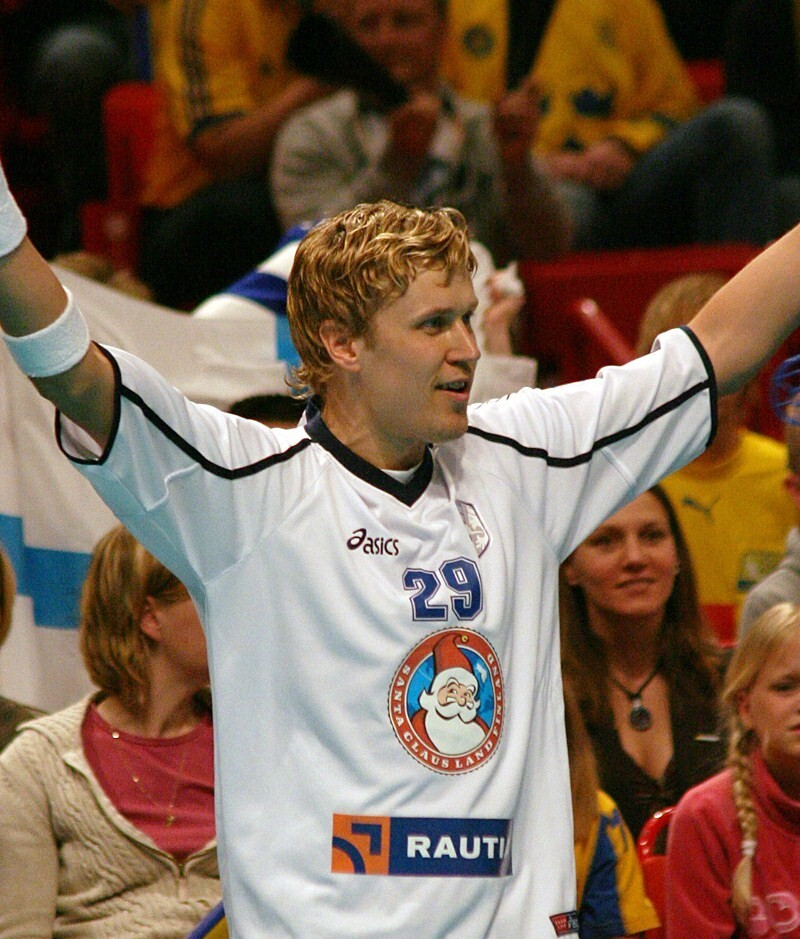
- Mika Kohonen celebrates a goal during a Finnish national team game

Personal information
- National team: Finland
- Born: May 10, 1977 (age 49) Jyväskylä, Finland
- Height: 6 ft 3 in (191 cm)
- Weight: 176 lb (80 kg)

Sport
- Sport: Floorball
- Position: Forward
- Shoots: Left
- League: Salibandyliiga (1995–2000, 2004–2005, 2015–2016, 2018–2019); SSL (2000–2004, 2005–2015, 2016–2018) (Sweden)
- Team: Happee Jyväskylä (1995–2000, 2004–2005, 2018–2019); Balrog IK (2000–2004) (Sweden); Storvreta IBK (2005–2015) (Sweden); SPV Seinäjoki (2015–2016); FC Helsingborg (2016–2018) (Sweden)
- Turned pro: 1995

Achievements and titles
- National finals: 4× SSL Gold; 2× SSL Gold (coach); 1× Salibandyliiga Silver
Medal record
Representing Finland
World Championships
Bronze medal – third place	1998 Czech Republic
Silver medal – second place	2000 Norway
Silver medal – second place	2002 Finland
Bronze medal – third place	2004 Switzerland
Silver medal – second place	2006 Sweden
Gold medal – first place	2008 Czech Republic
Gold medal – first place	2010 Finland
Silver medal – second place	2012 Switzerland
Silver medal – second place	2014 Sweden
Gold medal – first place	2016 Latvia
Gold medal – first place	2018 Czech Republic
World Games
Silver medal – second place	1997 Lahti
Bronze medal – third place	2017 Wroclaw

Mika Kohonen (born May 10, 1977) is a retired Finnish floorball player and currently a floorball coach. He is five-time recipient of Innebandymagazinet Award for the best player in the world. Since 2022, he is the head coach of Storvreta IBK, a team competing in the Swedish Super League. In addition to Storvreta, during his playing career, which spanned from 1995 to 2021, Kohonen played for Finnish clubs SPV Seinäjoki and Happee Jyväskylä and Swedish Balrog IK and FC Helsingborg. He was also a long-time member of the Finnish national floorball team, serving both as a player and later as an assistant coach.

== Club career ==
Kohonen began his professional career at the age of 18 during the 1995–96 season with the Finnish club Happee Jyväskylä, from his hometown of Jyväskylä. After five years, he started playing in the Swedish top league with the club Balrog IK. In his very first season, 2000–01, he set a still-unbroken league record with 107 points. In the 2003–04 season, he won his first title with the team after assisting on the decisive goal 13 seconds before the end of the final match. After four years in Sweden, he returned to Finland for the 2004–05 season due to military service, where he won the Finnish league silver medal with Happee.

He then played another ten seasons in Sweden, this time with the club Storvreta IBK, where he won first club's title in the 2009–10 season, followed by two more titles in the 2010–11 and 2011–12 seasons. In 2010 and 2012, he also won the Champions Cup with Storvreta.

He played the 2015–16 season back in Finland for SPV Seinäjoki. He then spent the next two seasons with the Swedish club FC Helsingborg. In 2018, he returned to Happee for the second time. In December 2019, he stopped playing due to an achilles tendon injury, and in January 2021, he officially retired from his career.

After the end of his playing career, he returned to Storvreta in 2020, initially as an assistant coach and, from 2022, as the head coach. Among others, he coaches his son Gabriel on the team. As a coach, he won three more titles with Storvreta in the 2022–23, 2023–24 and 2024-25 seasons, and Champions Cup in 2026.

He had his own line of floorball sticks, called MK29, which were released by floorball company Karhu.

== International career ==
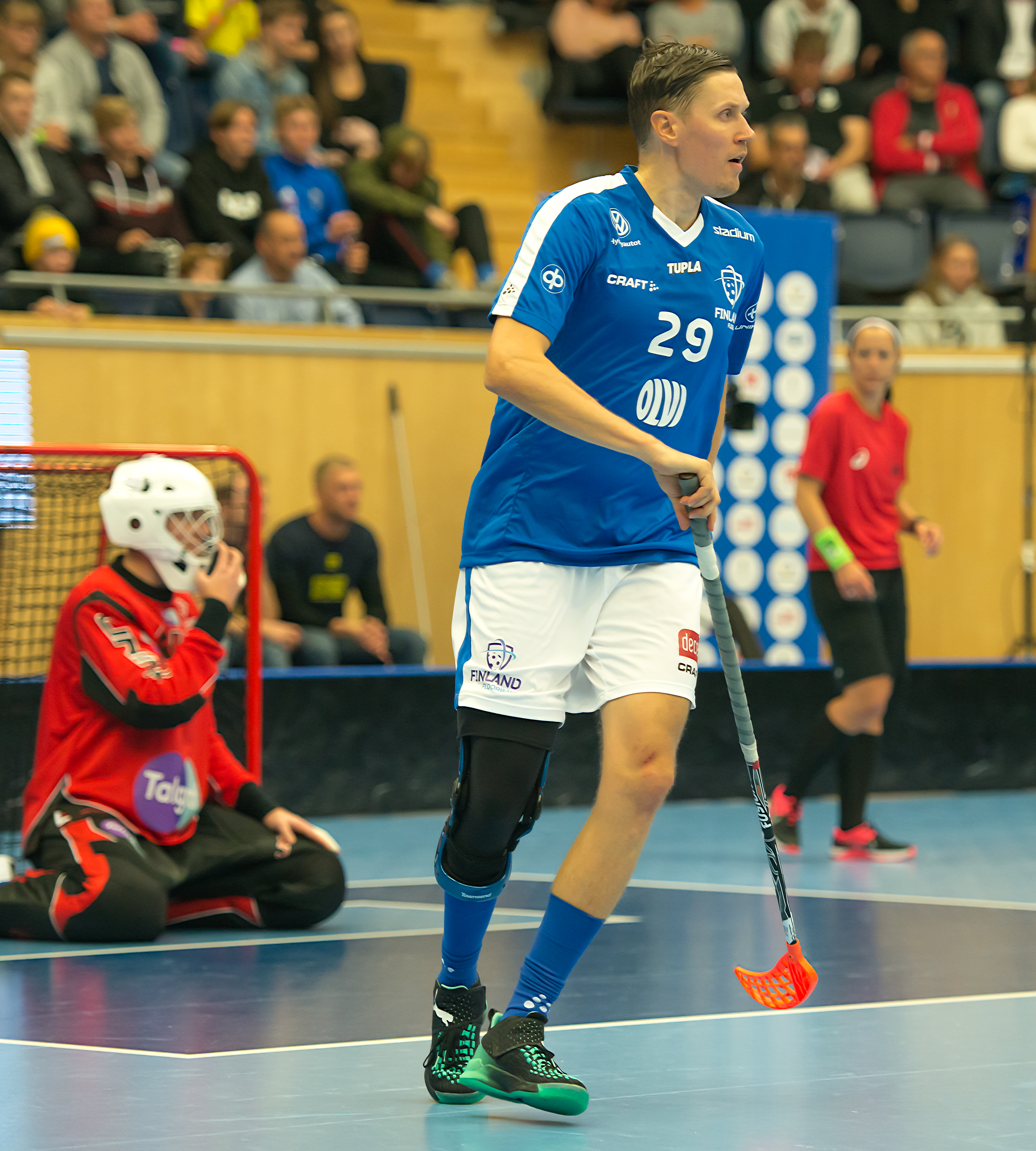
Mika Kohonen in a match against Sweden at the Euro Floorball Tour in 2018.

Kohonen represented Finland for the first time at the demonstration tournament at the home 1997 World Games. He subsequently played in a record 11 World Championships between 1998 and 2018. He won a medal at every tournament, including four golds, and was named to the All-Star Team five times. He holds the record for the most games played at the World Championships, as well as the record for the most games and total points for the Finnish national team.

At the World Championships in 2020 and 2022, he served as an assistant coach for the Finnish national team.

Year	Team	Event	Result
1997	Finland	WG	2nd place, silver medalist(s)
1998	Finland	WFC	3rd place, bronze medalist(s)
2000	Finland	WFC	2nd place, silver medalist(s)
2002	Finland	WFC	2nd place, silver medalist(s)
2004	Finland	WFC	3rd place, bronze medalist(s)
2006	Finland	WFC	2nd place, silver medalist(s)
2008	Finland	WFC	1st place, gold medalist(s)
2010	Finland	WFC	1st place, gold medalist(s)
2012	Finland	WFC	2nd place, silver medalist(s)
2014	Finland	WFC	2nd place, silver medalist(s)
2016	Finland	WFC	1st place, gold medalist(s)
2017	Finland	WG	3rd place, bronze medalist(s)
2018	Finland	WFC	1st place, gold medalist(s)
2020	Finland (asst. coach)	WFC	2nd place, silver medalist(s)
2022	Finland (asst. coach)	WFC	3rd place, bronze medalist(s)

== Awards and achievements ==
=== Awards ===
In the Innebandymagazinet poll, he was named the best floorball player in the world a record five times, in 2005, 2009, 2010, 2011, and 2012.

In 2021, during the Men's world floorball championships, he was inducted into the IFF Hall of Fame for the 2000–2009 decade.

=== Achievements ===
- Swedish Super League
  - Player of the Year: 2001-02
  - Rookie of the Year: 2001-02
  - Top Point Scorer: 2001-02
  - Most Assists: 2001–02, 2002–03
  - SSL Champion: 2010, 2011, 2012
  - SSL Third-placed: 2005, 2007, 2009
- Salibandyliiga
  - Most Assists: 2004–05

== Family ==
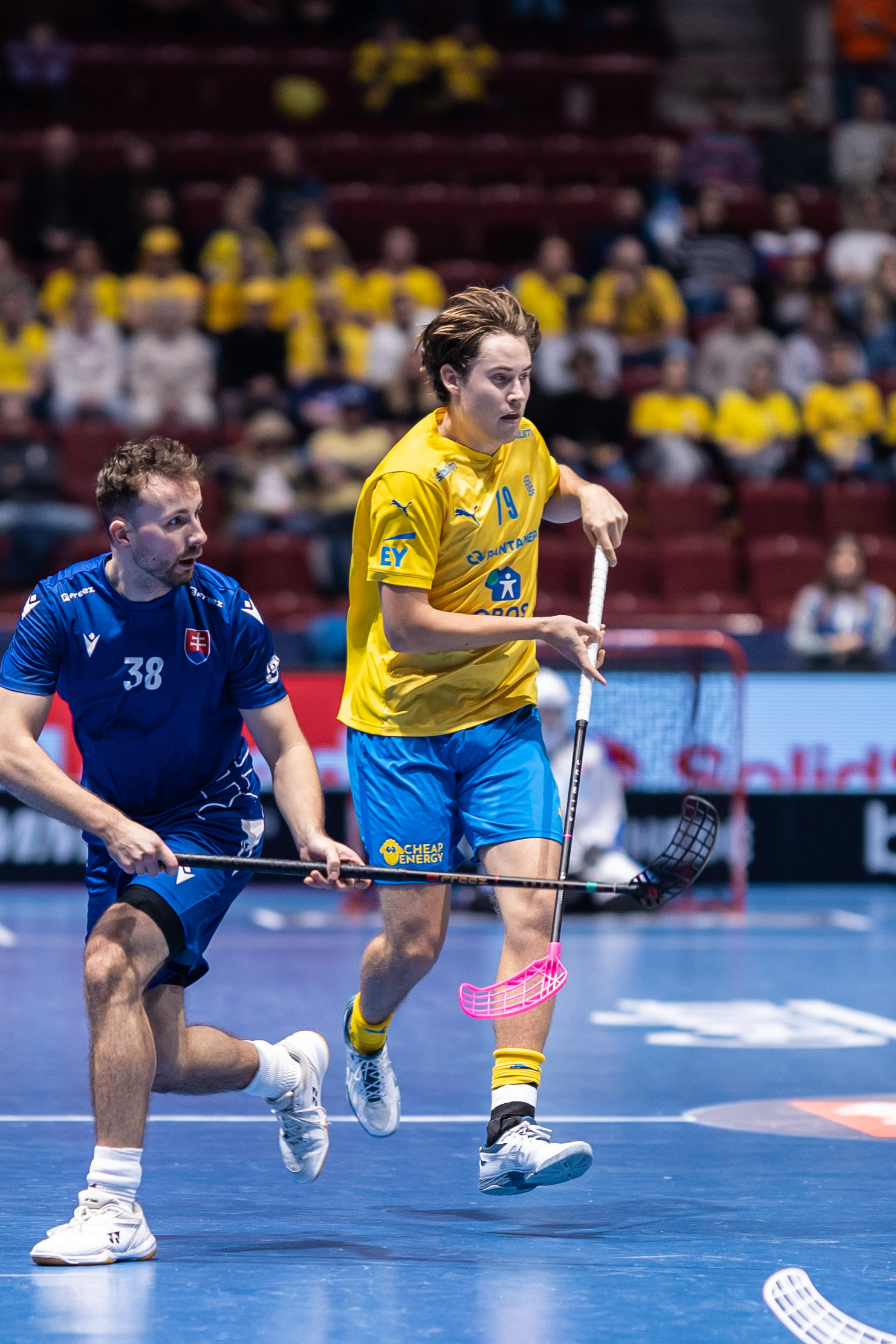
Kohonen's son, Gabriel, in yellow jersey of Sweden national team at 2024 World Championships

Kohonen's son, Gabriel, who was born in Sweden, is also a floorball player and represents Sweden at the international level.

Kohonen's brother, Mikko, is also a former floorball player and Finland national team member.

== Gallery ==
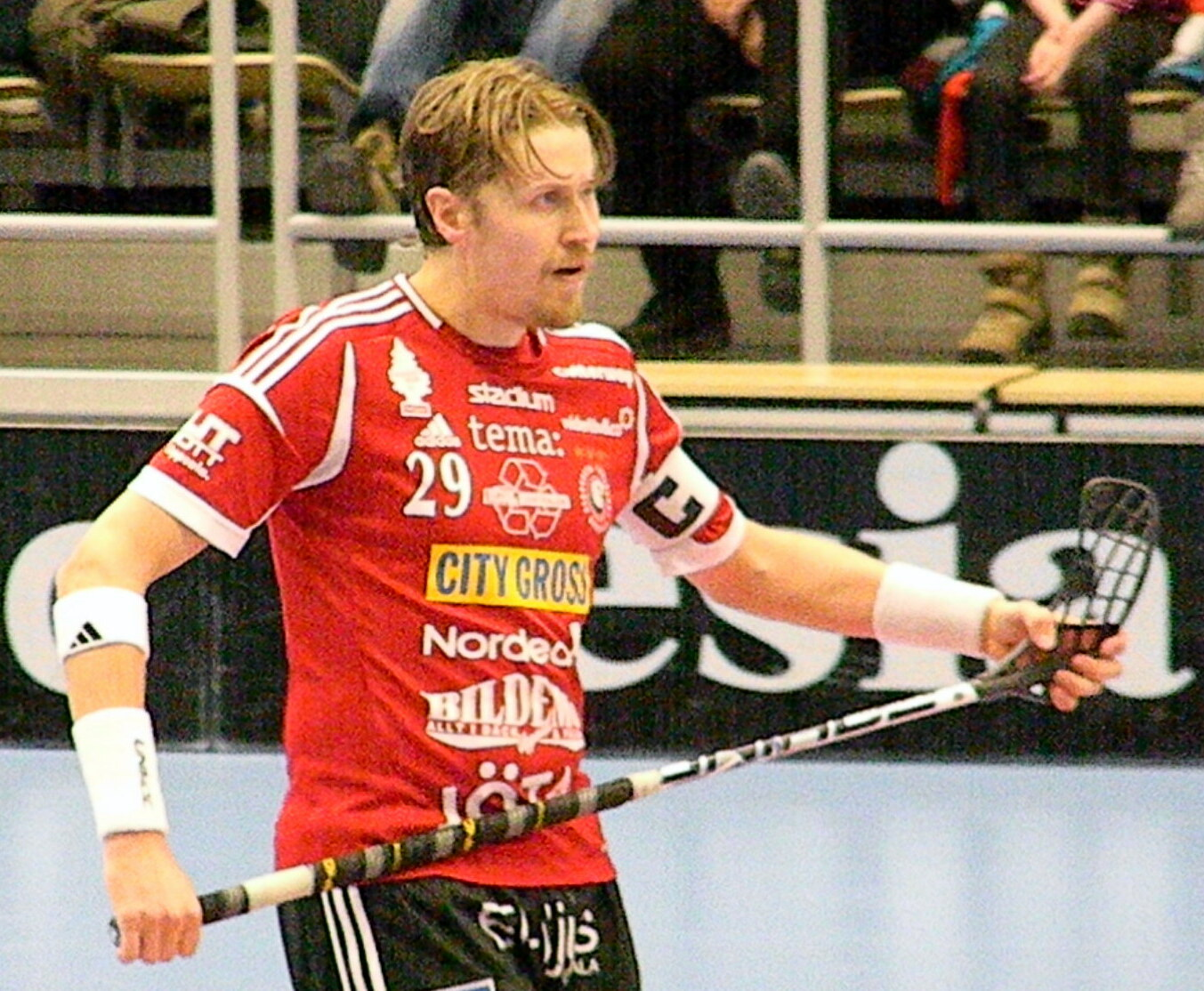
Mika Kohonen in 2013

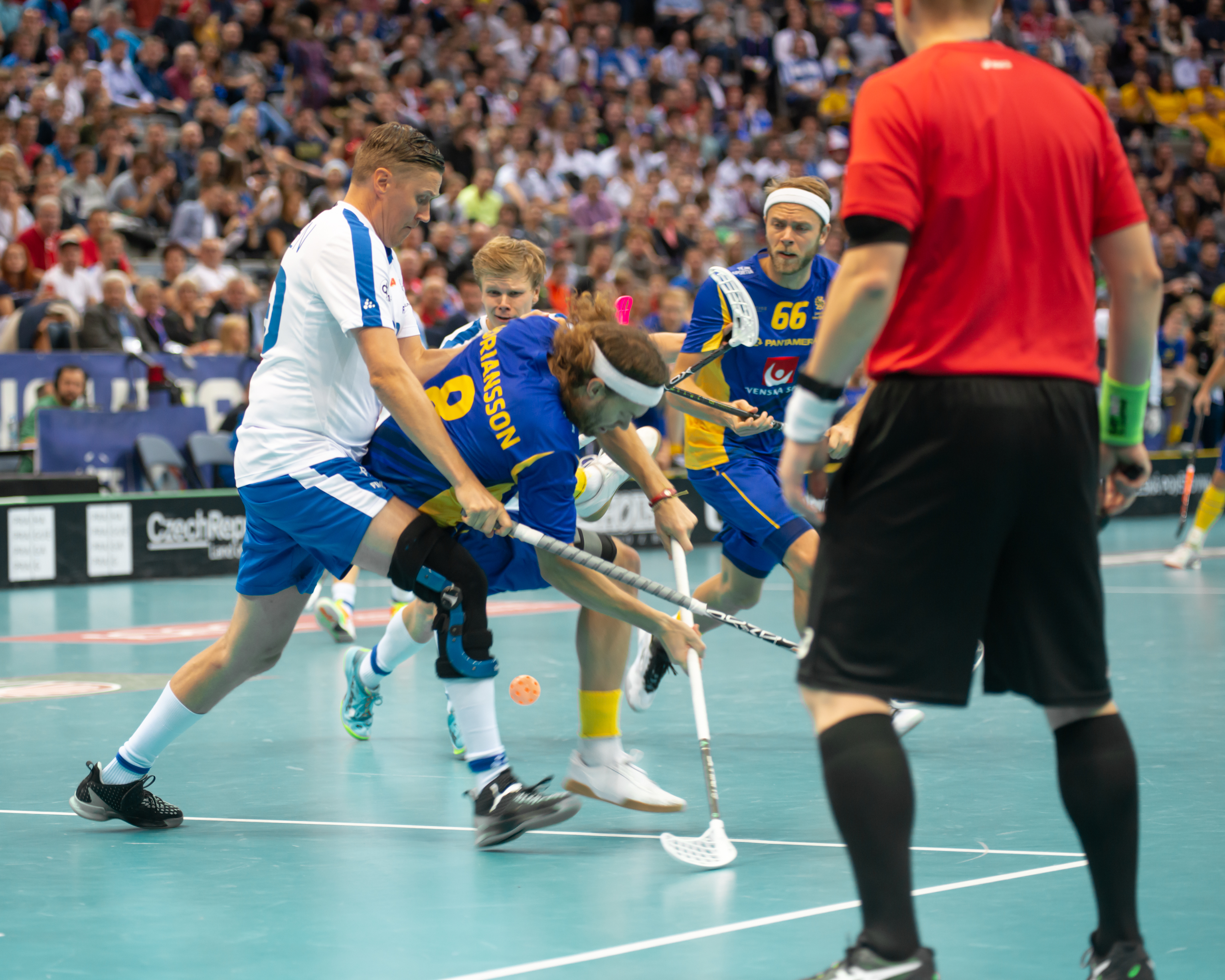
Mika Kohonen (left) in the final match against Sweden at the 2018 World Championships.

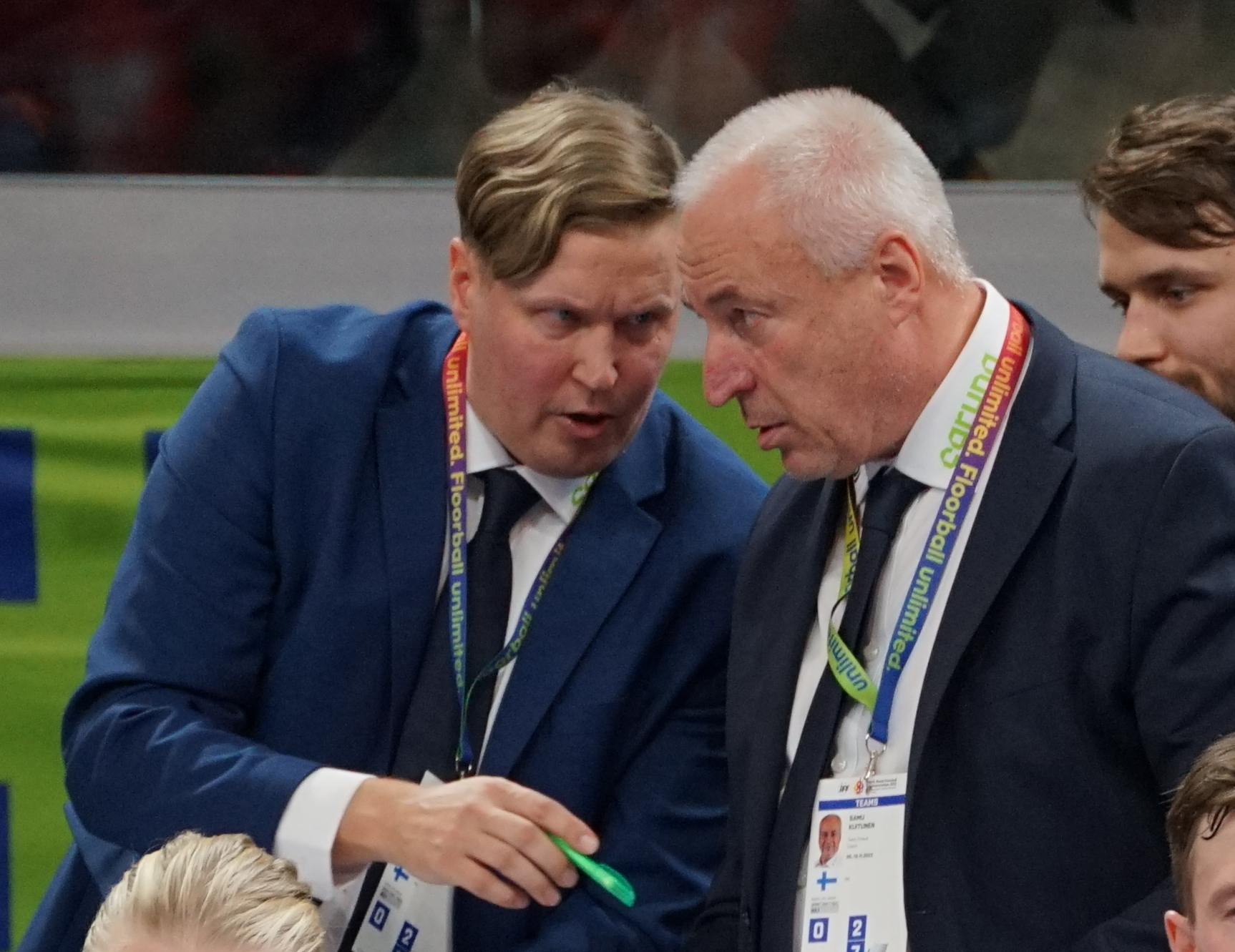
Mika Kohonen (left) in the semifinal match against Sweden at the 2022 World Championships.
