= 2012 Men's World Floorball Championships =

Floorball competition

Tournament details
- Host country: Switzerland
- Venues: 2 (in 2 host cities)
- Dates: 1–9 December 2012
- Teams: 16

Final positions
- Champions: Sweden
- Runners-up: Finland
- Third place: Switzerland

Tournament statistics
- Matches played: 41
- Attendance: 75,178 (1,834 per match)
- Scoring leader(s): (Switzerland) Emanuel Antener

Awards
- MVP: (Sweden) Kim Nilsson

The 2012 Men's World Floorball Championships were the ninth World Championships in men's floorball. It was held in Switzerland from 1 to 9 December 2012. Sixteen countries from three continents participated. The matches were played in sports arenas in Bern and Zurich.

The Finnish national team did not defend its title from the previous two championships, finishing second behind the victorious Swedes.

Germany achieved its best result in history by reaching the semifinals. It was the first time since 2000, and the last time until 2024, that a country other than the Czech Republic, Finland, Sweden, and Switzerland reached the top four.

== Qualification ==
There were five qualification groups for 11 places in the final tournament:

- Americas (2 teams)
- Asia & Oceania (2 teams from 2012 Asia Pacific Floorball Championship)
- Europe (7 teams from three groups)

Five best teams of 2010 World Championships automatically qualified for the competition.

Method of qualification	Slots	Qualified	Finals appearances	Last appearance	Previous best performance
2010 World Championships	5	Finland	9	2010	Winner (2008, 2010)
2010 World Championships	5	Sweden	9	2010	Winner (1996, 1998, 2000, 2002, 2004, 2006)
2010 World Championships	5	Czech Republic	9	2010	Runner-up (2004)
2010 World Championships	5	Switzerland	9	2010	Runner-up (1998)
2010 World Championships	5	Latvia	8	2010	5th (2006, 2008, 2010)
European qualification 1	2	Norway	9	2010	Third (1996)
European qualification 1	2	Germany	7	2010	8th (1996, 1998, 2002, 2004)
European qualification 2	2	Estonia	4	2010	7th (2010)
European qualification 2	2	Slovakia	1	–	–
European qualification 3	3	Russia	8	2010	6th (1996)
European qualification 3	3	Poland	2	2010	9th (2010)
European qualification 3	3	Hungary	2	1996	10th (1996)
Asia–Oceania qualification	2	Singapore	3	2010	12th (1996)
Asia–Oceania qualification	2	Japan	2	2010	15th (2010)
Americas qualification	2	United States	1	–	–
Americas qualification	2	Canada	2	2010	11th (2010)

== Format ==
The teams are drawn into four groups of four. Two best-placed teams of each group advance into quarterfinals. The winners of the quarterfinals continue to the semifinals. The losers of the semifinals play two games and the winners of these games play for 5th and 6th place and for the losers of these two matches the tournament is over. The 7th team is the team losing to the team which achieves the 5th place on the tournament. Third and fourth placed teams in the group stage play for places 9–12 and 13–16 respectively.

== Tournament groups ==
The draw was made in the beginning of March.

Group A	Group B	Group C	Group D
Switzerland	Sweden	Czech Republic	Finland
Estonia	Norway	Latvia	Russia
Singapore	Poland	Japan	Germany
Slovakia	Hungary	United States	Canada

== Preliminary round ==
The top two teams from each group advanced to the quarter finals, while the last two teams play in the placement round.

Team advanced to the quarter finals

=== Group A ===
Team	Pld	W	D	L	GF	GA	GD	Pts
Switzerland	3	3	0	0	57	7	+50	6
Slovakia	3	1	1	1	21	14	+7	3
Estonia	3	1	1	1	20	20	0	3
Singapore	3	0	0	3	4	61	−57	0

December 2, 2012

Slovakia	4–8	Switzerland

December 3, 2012

Estonia	13–2	Singapore

December 4, 2012

Switzerland	35–0	Singapore

Slovakia	4–4	Estonia

December 5, 2012

Switzerland	14–3	Estonia

Singapore	2–13	Slovakia

=== Group B ===
Team	Pld	W	D	L	GF	GA	GD	Pts
Sweden	3	3	0	0	54	6	+48	6
Norway	3	2	0	1	25	12	+13	4
Poland	3	1	0	2	10	32	−22	2
Hungary	3	0	0	3	7	46	−39	0

December 2, 2012

Poland	3–14	Sweden

Norway	8–3	Hungary

December 3, 2012

Norway	16–2	Poland

Hungary	2–33	Sweden

December 4, 2012

Hungary	2–5	Poland

December 5, 2012

Sweden	7–1	Norway

=== Group C ===
Team	Pld	W	D	L	GF	GA	GD	Pts
Latvia	3	3	0	0	24	8	+16	6
Czech Republic	3	2	0	1	38	10	+28	4
United States	3	1	0	2	16	23	−7	2
Japan	3	0	0	3	4	41	−37	0

December 2, 2012

Latvia	8–3	United States

Japan	1–21	Czech Republic

December 3, 2012

Czech Republic	13–4	United States

Japan	1–11	Latvia

December 4, 2012

Czech Republic	4–5	Latvia

December 5, 2012

United States	9–2	Japan

=== Group D ===
Team	Pld	W	D	L	GF	GA	GD	Pts
Finland	3	3	0	0	55	5	+50	6
Germany	3	2	0	1	15	15	0	4
Russia	3	1	0	2	17	26	−9	2
Canada	3	0	0	3	11	52	−41	0

December 2, 2012

Germany	1–10	Finland

December 3, 2012

Canada	6–13	Russia

December 4, 2012

Finland	16–1	Russia

Germany	10–2	Canada

December 5, 2012

Russia	3–4	Germany

Finland	29–3	Canada

== Playoff round ==
Quarterfinals
A1	Switzerland	11
B2	Norway	5
D1	Finland	4
C2	Czech Republic	1
C1	Latvia	2
D2	Germany	4
B1	Sweden	18
A2	Slovakia	1

Semifinals
Q1	Switzerland	3
Q4	Finland	4
Q2	Germany	0
Q3	Sweden	13

Finals
W1	Finland	5
W2	Sweden	11

=== Quarterfinals ===
6 December 2012; 16:30	Switzerland	11–5 (3–1, 6–1, 2–3)	Norway	Sporthalle Wankdorf, Bern; Attendance: 1,674

Report

6 December 2012; 18:30	Latvia	2–4 (1–2, 1–1, 0–1)	Germany	Saalsporthalle, Zurich; Attendance: 613

Report

6 December 2012; 19:30	Sweden	18–1 (5–0, 8–0, 5–1)	Slovakia	Sporthalle Wankdorf, Bern; Attendance: 1,289

Report

6 December 2012; 15:30	Finland	4–1 (1–0, 2–1, 1–0)	Czech Republic	Saalsporthalle, Zurich; Attendance: 787

Report

=== Semifinals ===
8 December 2012; 16:32	Switzerland	3–4 OT (1–1, 2–0, 0–2, 0–1)	Finland	Hallenstadion, Zurich; Attendance: 7,085

Report

8 December 2012; 19:30	Germany	0–13 (0–5, 0–4, 0–4)	Sweden	Hallenstadion, Zurich; Attendance: 7,104

Report

=== Bronze medal game ===
9 December 2012; 12:31	Switzerland	8–0 (3–0, 3–0, 2–0)	Germany	Hallenstadion, Zurich; Attendance: 10,518

Report

=== Gold medal game ===
9 December 2012; 15:30	Finland	5–11 (0–3, 1–6, 4–2)	Sweden	Hallenstadion, Zurich; Attendance: 10,518

Report

== Placement round ==
=== 5th place bracket ===
Matches 5th–8th
Norway	5
Czech Republic	4
Latvia	6
Slovakia	2

5th place
Norway	7
Latvia	5

==== 5–8th place semifinals ====
7 December 2012; 16:30	Norway	5–4 PS (1–2, 3–2, 0–0, 0–0)	Czech Republic	Saalsporthalle, Zurich; Attendance: 486

Game reference

7 December 2012; 20:00	Latvia	6–2 (0–1, 4–0, 2–1)	Slovakia	Saalsporthalle, Zurich; Attendance: 321

Game reference

==== 5th place match ====
8 December 2012; 13:30	Norway	7–5 (4–1, 1–1, 2–3)	Latvia	Hallenstadion, Zurich; Attendance: 3,854

Game reference

No 7th place match was played.

=== 9th place bracket ===
Matches 9th–12th
Estonia	4
Poland	3
United States	1
Russia	7

9th place
Estonia	9
Russia	3
11th place
Poland	7
United States	6

==== 9–12th place semifinals ====
6 December 2012; 13:29	Estonia	4–3 (2–0, 2–2, 0–1)	Poland	Sporthalle Wankdorf, Bern; Attendance: 784

Game reference

6 December 2012; 12:30	United States	1–7 (0–3, 1–4, 0–0)	Russia	Saalsporthalle, Zurich; Attendance: 994

Game reference

==== 11th place match ====
7 December 2012; 16:30	Poland	7–6 PS (0–1, 3–1, 3–4, 0–0)	United States	Sporthalle Wankdorf, Bern; Attendance: 289

Game reference

==== 9th place match ====
7 December 2012; 13:30	Estonia	9–3 (5–1, 2–0, 2–2)	Russia	Saalsporthalle, Zurich; Attendance: 654

Game reference

=== 13th place bracket ===
Matches 13th–16th
Singapore	3
Hungary	11
Japan	2
Canada	6

13th place
Hungary	7
Canada	8
15th place
Singapore	3
Japan	5

==== 13–16th place semifinals ====
6 December 2012; 10:30	Singapore	3–11 (2–4, 0–4, 1–3)	Hungary	Sporthalle Wankdorf, Bern; Attendance: 486

Game reference

6 December 2012; 9:30	Japan	2–6 (1–3, 0–1, 1–2)	Canada	Saalsporthalle, Zurich; Attendance: 1,123

Game reference

==== 15th place match ====
7 December 2012; 13:30	Singapore	3–5 (0–2, 0–2, 3–1)	Japan	Sporthalle Wankdorf, Bern; Attendance: 324

Game reference

==== 13th place match ====
7 December 2012; 19:59	Hungary	7–8 OT (3–2, 1–2, 3–3, 0–1)	Canada	Sporthalle Wankdorf, Bern; Attendance: 234

Game reference

== Ranking ==
Official rankings according to the IFF:

Rk.	Team
1st place, gold medalist(s)	Sweden
2nd place, silver medalist(s)	Finland
3rd place, bronze medalist(s)	Switzerland
4.	Germany
5.	Norway
6.	Latvia
7.	Czech Republic
8.	Slovakia
9.	Estonia
10.	Russia
11.	Poland
12.	United States
13.	Canada
14.	Hungary
15.	Japan
16.	Singapore
