= Floorball European Championships =

International floorball competition

- Status: not active
- Genre: sporting event
- Date: May–June
- Frequency: annual
- Location: various
- Inaugurated: 1994 (men); 1995 (women)
- Most recent: 1995
- Organiser: IFF

The Floorball European Championships were floorball European Championships organized by the International Floorball Federation (IFF). The men's championship was first held in Finland in 1994. In the 1995 edition, Japan also participated in both the men's and women's tournaments. The men's tournament was originally scheduled to be held in Finland and the women's in Sweden. To allow Japan to participate, both tournaments were renamed to the Open European Championships and were held together in Switzerland.

The European Championship was replaced by the World Championship after 1995: for men starting from the 1996 edition, and for women from the 1997 edition.

In 2026, as part of the reorganization of international competitions into a four-year cycle, continental championships—including the European Championship—were introduced, which will also serve as qualifiers for the World Championship. The women's European Championship will be held for the first time in 2029, and the men's in 2030.

== Men ==
=== Results ===
Year	Final venue	Winners	Score	Runners-up	Third place	Score	Fourth place
1994; Details	(Finland); Helsinki	Sweden	4–1	Finland	Switzerland	4–2	Norway
1995; Details	Switzerland	Finland	3–2 PS	Sweden	Switzerland	5–3	Russia

== Women ==
=== Results ===
Year	Final venue	Winners	Score	Runners-up	Third place	Score	Fourth place
1995; Details	Switzerland	Sweden	8–2	Norway	Finland	3–2	Switzerland

== See also ==
- Men's World Floorball Championship
- Women's World Floorball Championship
