= Switzerland men's national floorball team =

Switzerland
- IFF Ranking: 5th (2024)

The Switzerland men's national floorball team is the national floorball team of Switzerland, and a founding member of the International Floorball Federation.

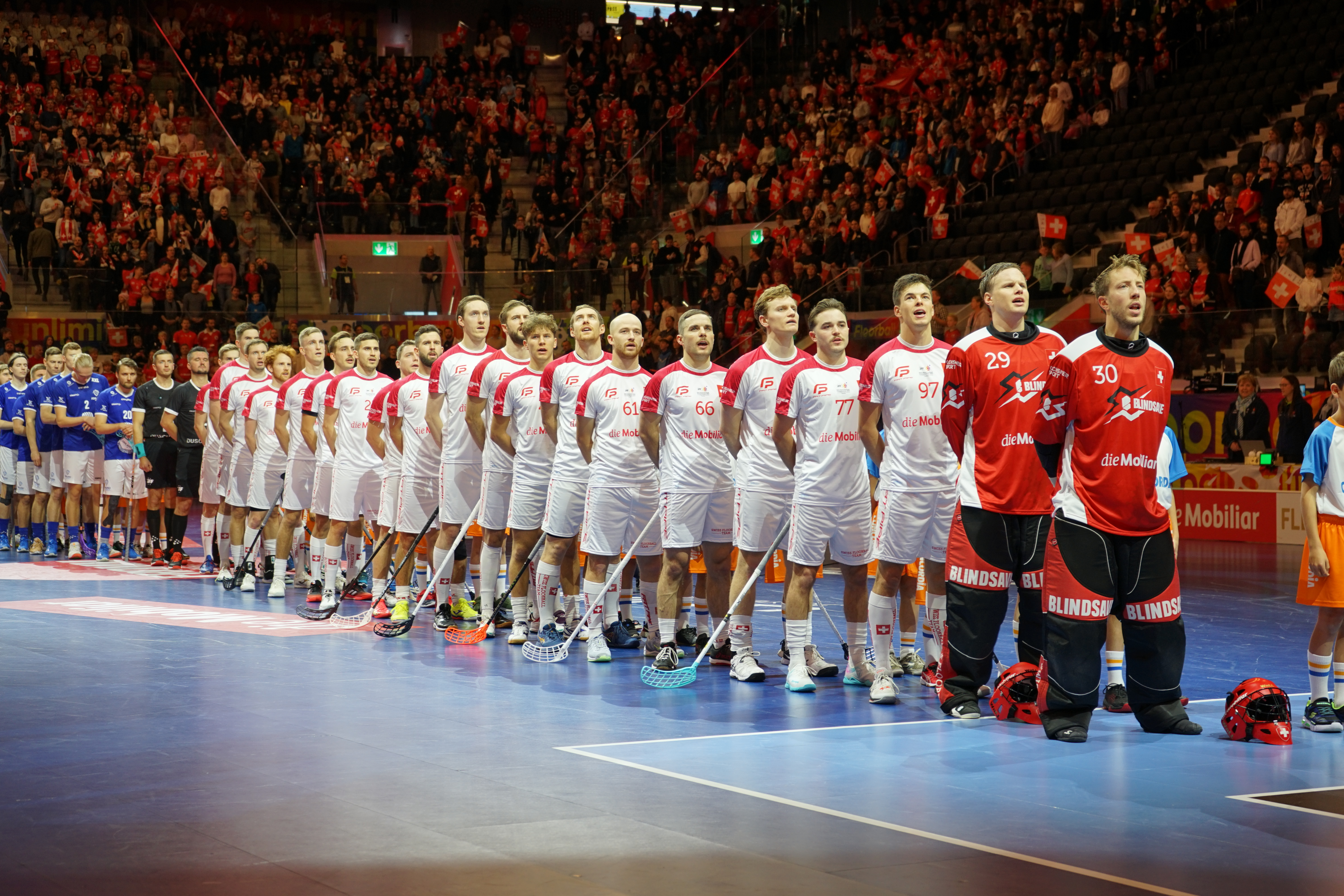
Switzerland's team at 2022 World Championships

The team has participated in all World and European Championships as well as floorball tournaments at the World Games. Its biggest success is silver medal from the second World Championships in 1998. The team also won seven bronze medals, the last time in 2018. That makes Switzerland the fourth most successful team after the third Czech Republic and before the fifth Norway.

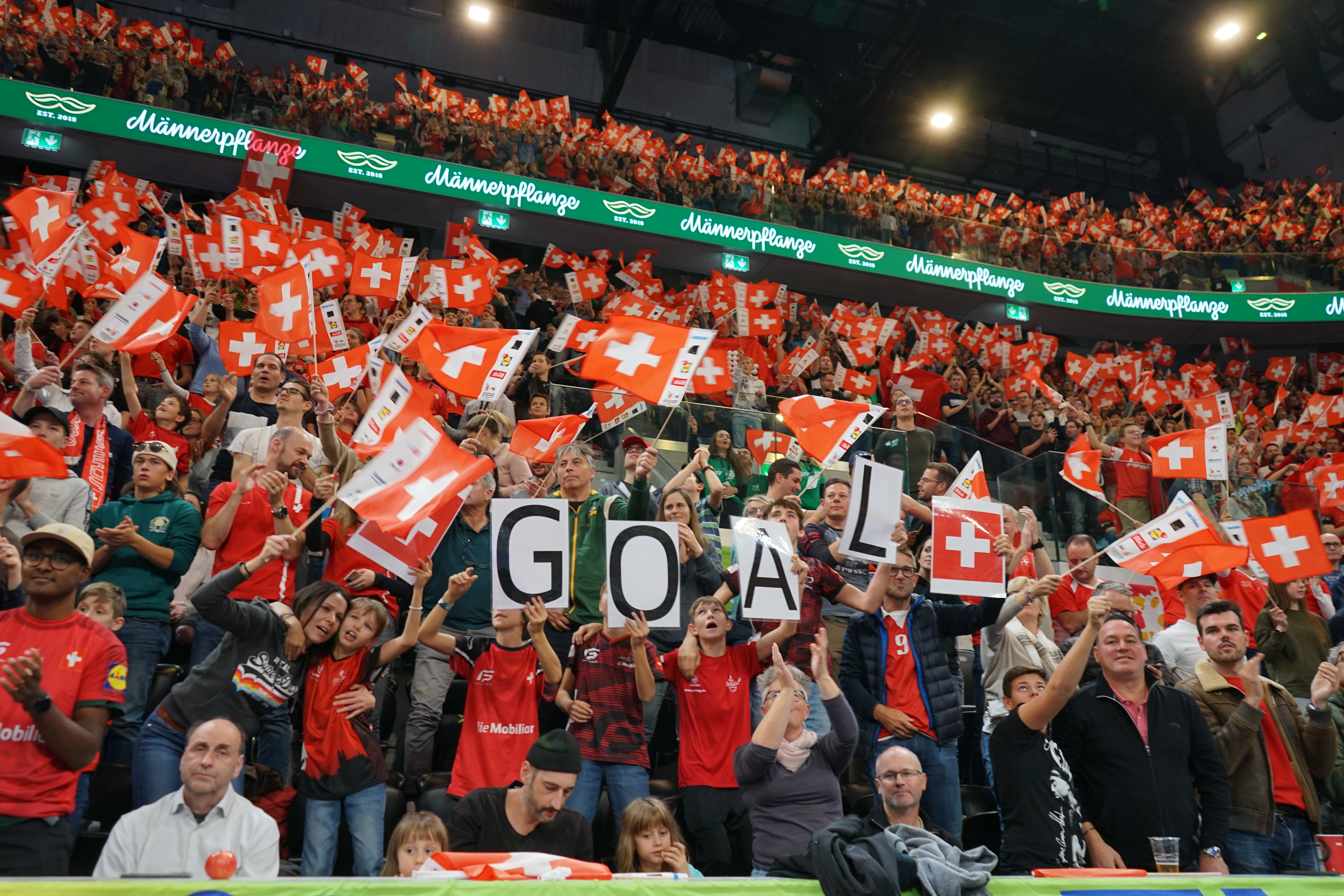
Fans of Switzerland's team at 2022 World Championships match against Finland

At the last World Championship in 2024, Switzerland ended on the fifth place, their worst result together with the first World Championships in 1996. At the 2006 tournament, the Swiss became the first team in history not to lose to Sweden at a World Championship. At the first World Games in 2017, the Swiss won silver. In contrast, in 2022 they failed to reach the semifinals and finished fifth. At the most recent Games in 2025, they placed fourth.

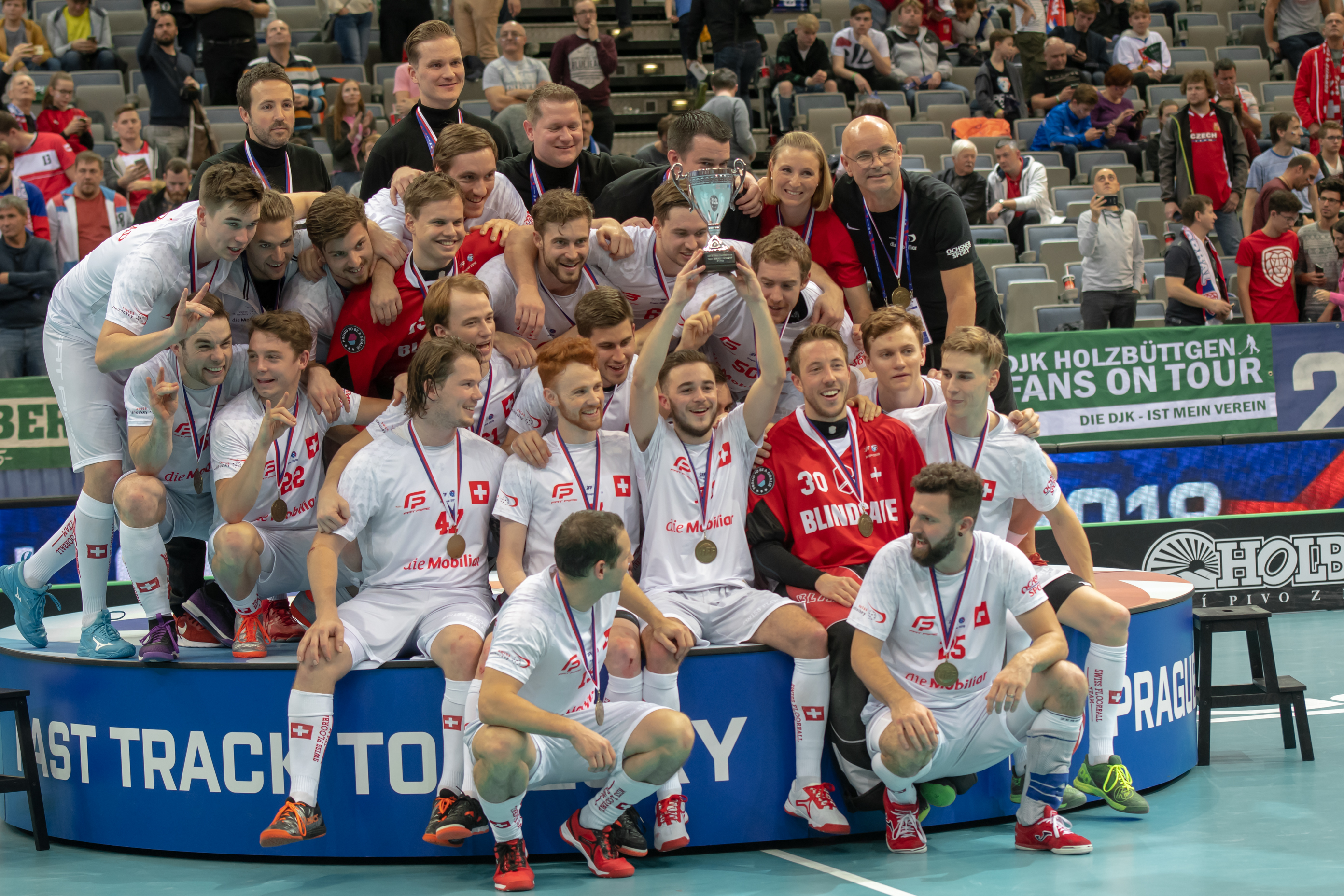
Switzerland's team celebrates their victory in the bronze medal match against the Czech Republic at the 2018 World Championships

Switzerland is ranked fifth in the IFF ranking (behind Latvia and ahead of Slovakia), following their fifth and fourth-place finishes at the World Championships in 2024 and 2022.

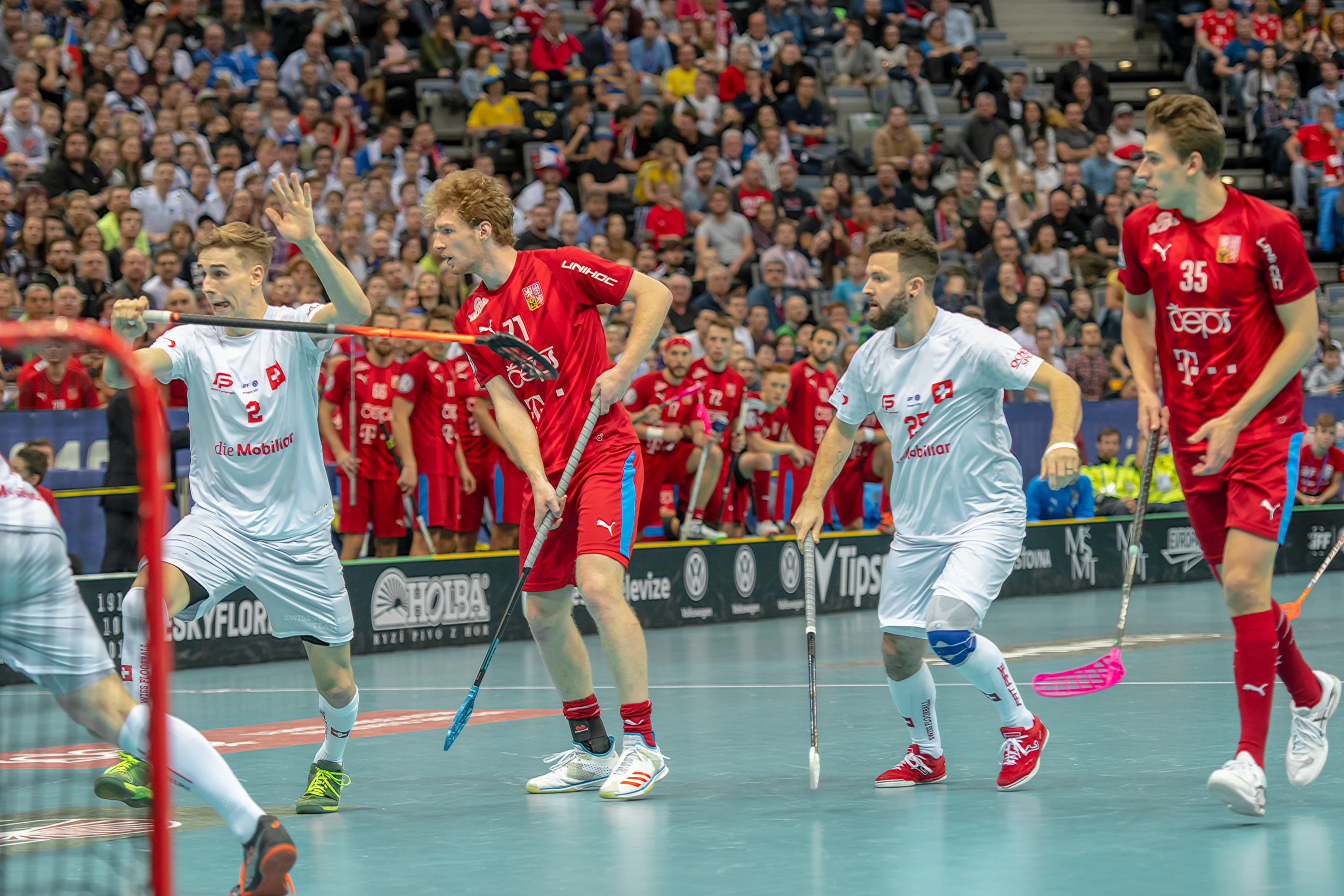
Players of the Swiss team (in white) in the bronze medal match against the Czech Republic at the 2018 World Championship

== World Championships ==
Year	Hosting Country	Rank	Final match
1996	Sweden	5th place	Russia 8–3
1998	Czech Republic	2nd place	Sweden 3–10
2000	Norway	3rd place	Denmark 4–2
2002	Finland	3rd place	Czech Republic 4–3 OT
2004	Switzerland	4th place	Finland 7–8ts
2006	Sweden	3rd place	Czech Republic 9–4
2008	Czech Republic	3rd place	Czech Republic 5–4 OT
2010	Finland	4th place	Czech Republic 3–9
2012	Switzerland	3rd place	Germany 8–0
2014	Sweden	4th place	Czech Republic 3–4
2016	Latvia	3rd place	Czech Republic 8–5
2018	Czech Republic	3rd place	Czech Republic 4–2
2020	Finland	4th place	Czech Republic 3–4 OT
2022	Switzerland	4th place	Finland 3–5
2024	Sweden	5th place	Slovakia 6–3
2026	Finland		

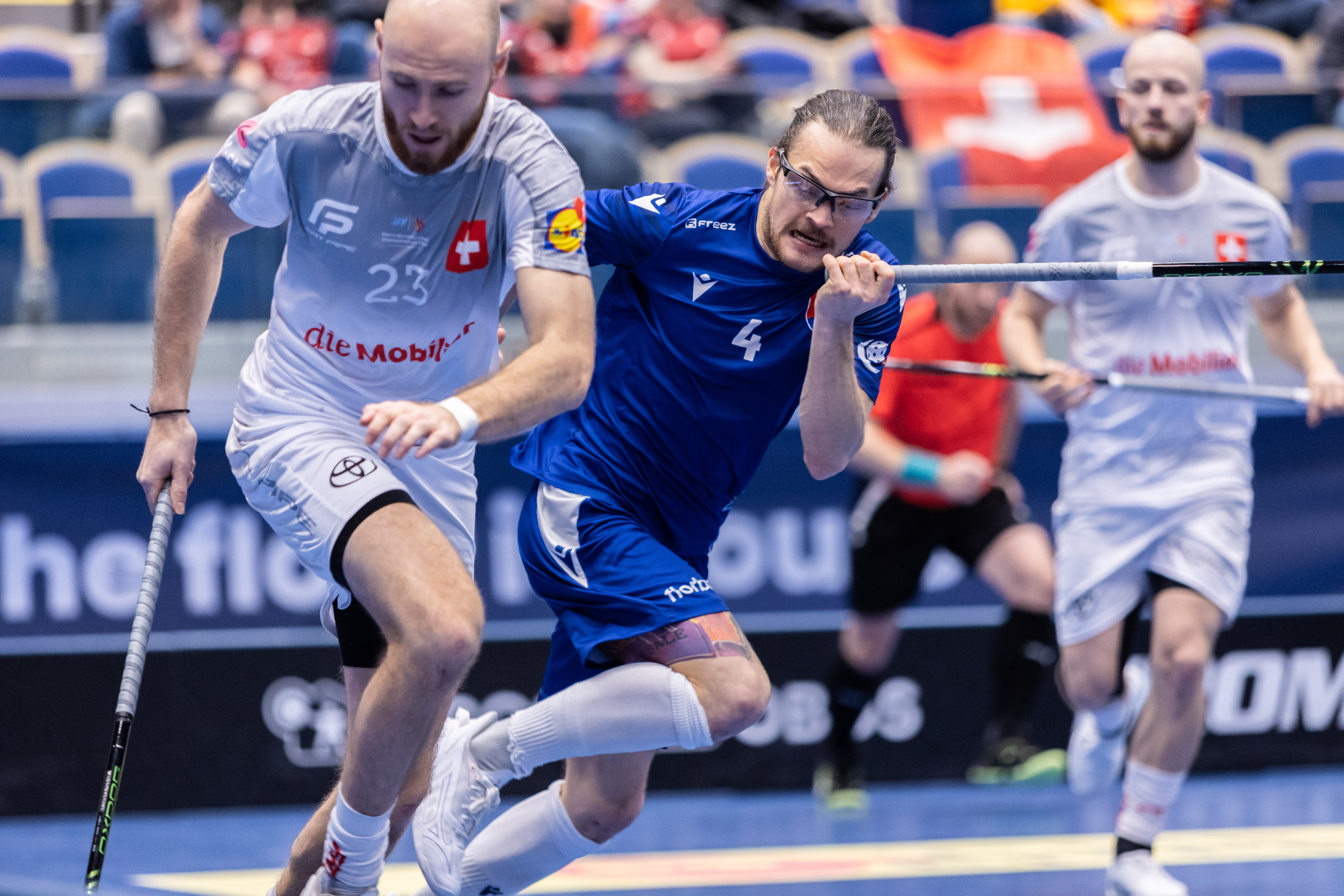
Players of the Swiss team (in white) in the match for fifth place against Slovakia at the 2024 World Championship

== World Games ==
Year	Hosting Country	Rank	Final match
2017	Poland	2nd place	Sweden 5–7
2022	USA	5th place	Canada 12–1
2025	China	4th place	Czech Republic 2–7

== European Championships ==
Year	Hosting Country	Rank	Final match
1994	Finland	3rd place	Norway 4–2
1995	Switzerland	3rd place	Russia 5–3
