= Finland men's national floorball team =

Finland Men's National Floorball Team
- Founded: 1985
- Manager: (Finland) Jari Oksanen
- Coach: (Finland) Esa Jussila
- IFF Ranking: 2nd (2024)
- First game: 1–13, vs. Sweden (28 September 1985)
- Largest win: 42–0, vs. China (6 August 2025)
- Largest defeat: 1–13, vs. Sweden (28 September 1985)
- All-time top scorer: Tero Tiitu (110 goals)
- Championships: 5: World Championships (2008, 2010, 2016, 2018, 2024); 1: European Championships (1995)
Home colors	Away colors

Finland men's national floorball team is the national floorball team of Finland. The national team was founded in 1985 and they played their first official game against Sweden in 1985. Finland has won five World Championships (2008, 2010, 2016, 2018, 2024) and one European Championships (1995). Finland has appeared in every World and European Championships and the World Games tournament organised by the IFF and is the only team with Sweden to have won such a tournament. The Finns have won half of the last ten world championships.

In the IFF ranking, Finland is second (behind Sweden and ahead of the Czech Republic), following first and third place finishes in the championships in 2024 and 2022.

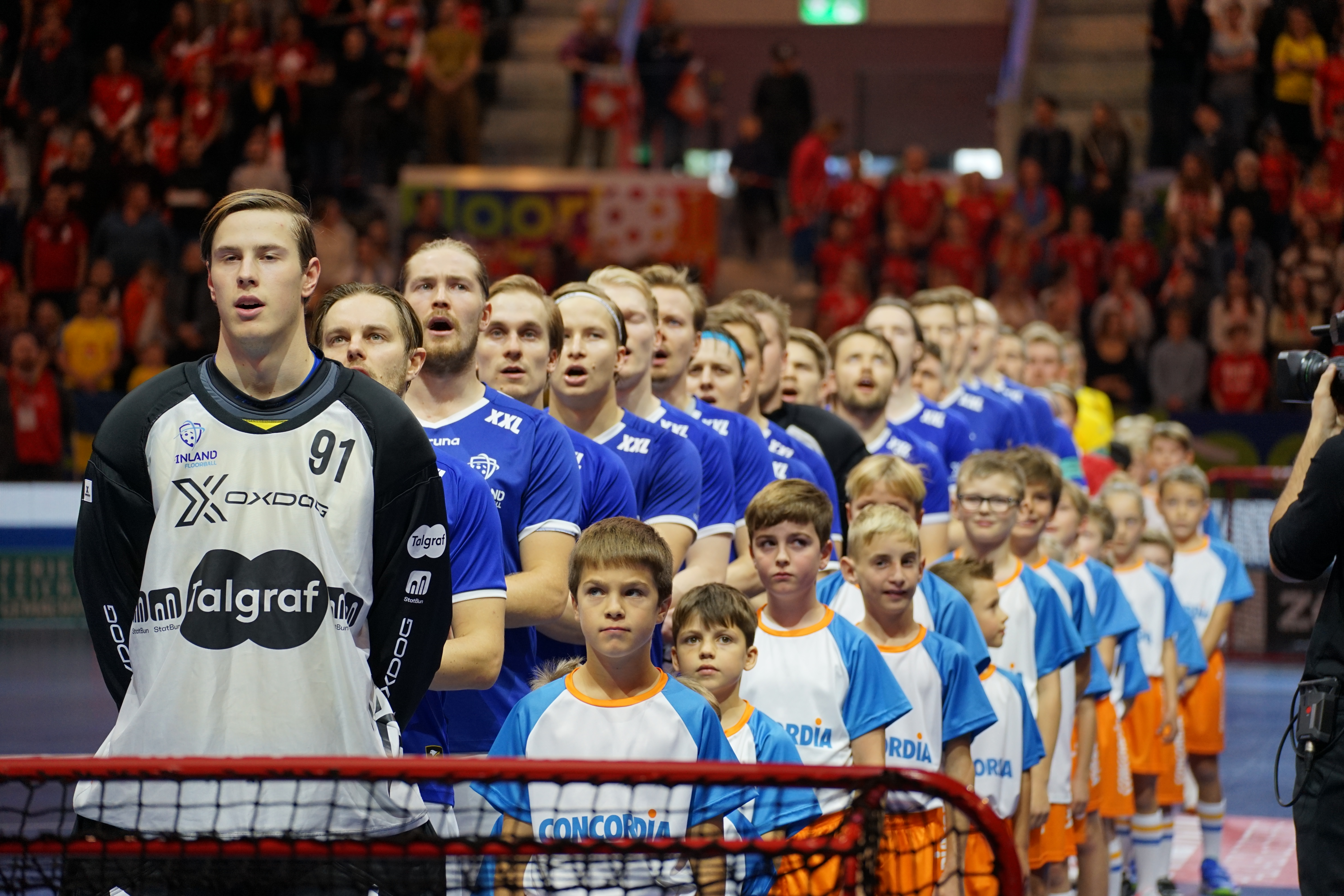
Finnish team at the 2022 World Championship

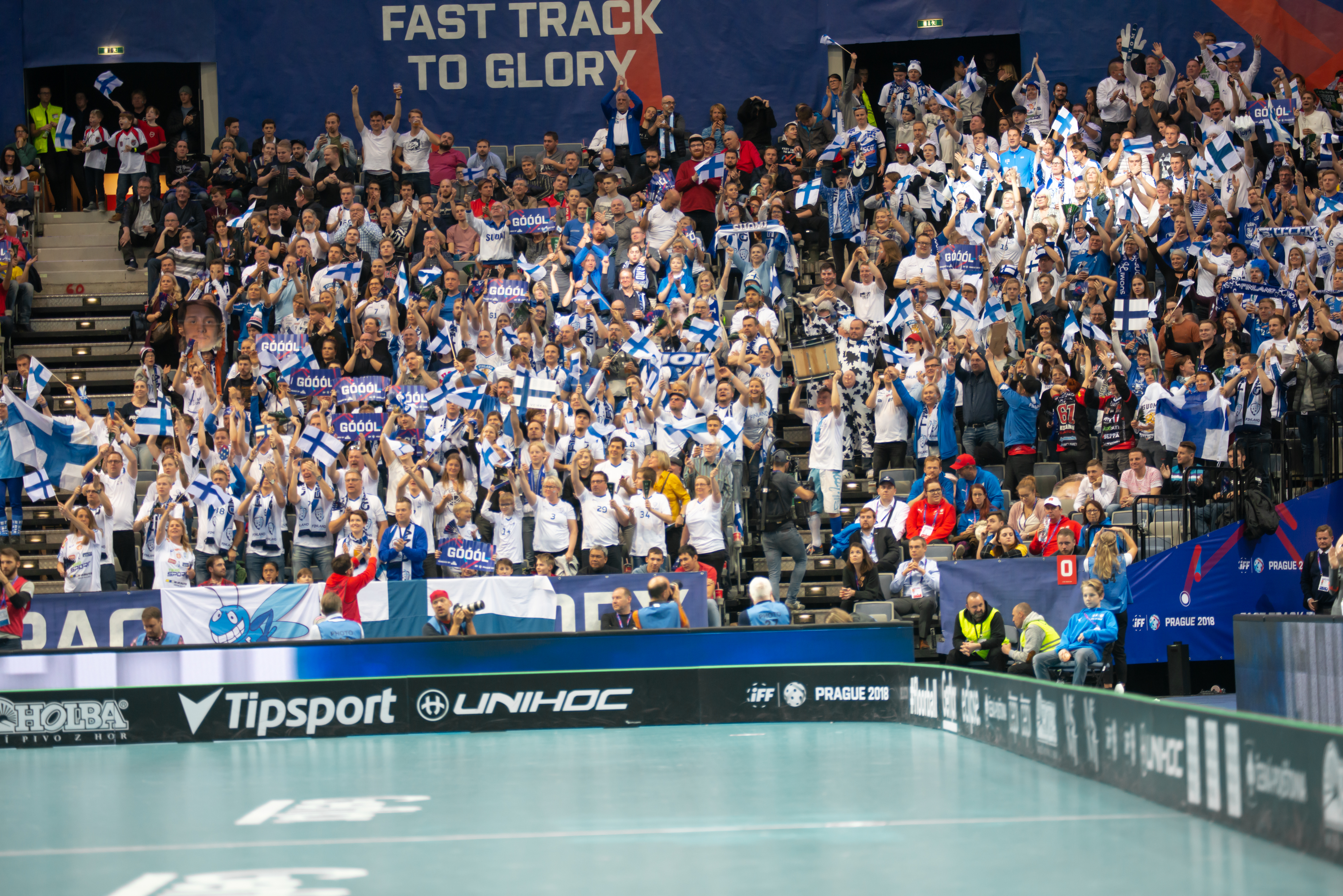
Fans of the Finnish team in the final of the 2018 World Championship

== History ==
=== Early years ===
The Finland national floorball team was founded in 1985 and they played their first game against Sweden in Sollentuna on 28 September 1985. Finland lost 1–13 and it is still the worst defeat the national team has suffered so far. Pekka Kainulainen scored the first goal of the match and the first official national team goal leading Finland to early 1–0 lead.

=== 1991–2000 ===
The 1994 and 1995 European Championships
The national team participated to the 1994 and 1995 European Championships, which were the first organised international floorball tournaments between national teams. In 1994 tournament Finland lost to Sweden in the final (4–1) on home ground in Helsinki after upsetting the Swedes earlier in the group stage. The 1995 European Championships tournament was held in Switzerland and the national team succeeded in making their way in to the final, where they were to meet Sweden again. This time Finland fared better and after a stalemate in regular time and overtime, Finland won the championships in a penalty shootout. Successful penalty shots by Jari Pekkola and Jari-Pekka Lehtonen, and goaltending by Jan Gråsten guaranteed the victory.

1996 World Championships
The first ever World Championship tournament was held in Stockholm, Sweden. Finland placed second after being clearly outplayed by Sweden and losing 5–0 in the final. The final match was played in Stockholm Globe Arena in front of 15,106 spectators.

1998 World Championships
The tournament in Prague, Czech Republic was a disappointment for team Finland. Finland lost to Switzerland (4–5) in the semi-finals in a penalty shootout and the national team placed third after beating Denmark 4–1 in the bronze medal game. Mika Kohonen was Finland's leading forward with 6 goals and 2 assists in 5 games.

2000 World Championships
Finland was expected to challenge Sweden for real this time around and two teams met yet again in the final match. The final match was played in Jordal Amfi in Oslo, Norway and it was the closest World Championships final yet, with Sweden taking the title with a 5–3 victory.

=== 2001–2010 ===
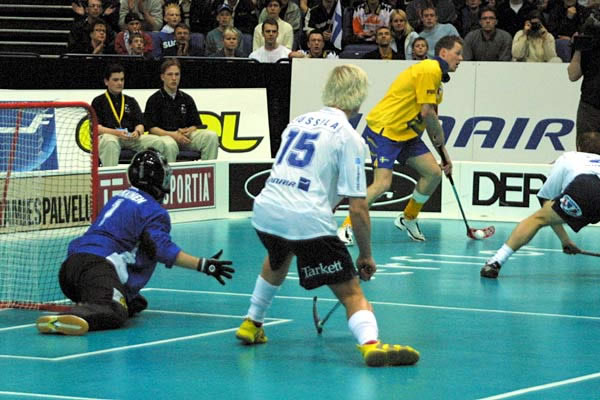
Finland playing against Sweden.

2002 World Championships
The 2002 World Championships tournament was hosted in Helsinki, Finland and the national team was eager to bring home the title in front of their home crowd. Finland battled its way to the final to meet Sweden. The final match was played in Hartwall Arena with 13,665 spectators, who witnessed Sweden grabbing yet another World Championships title in thriller of a match with 3 goals score in the last minute. The final score was 6–4 to Sweden.

2004 World Championships
This time Finland and Sweden met in the semi-finals. Sweden gained the upper hand, were victorious and continued on to the final. Finland was to settle for the bronze medal game where they met Switzerland, an upcoming floorball nation, who had upset Finland earlier in the group stage with a 4–3 victory. The game was again close fought with team Finland emerging on top in a high scoring 8–7 win decided in a penalty shootout. Henri Toivoniemi (GK), Jari Lehtonen (D) and Mika Kohonen (F) were selected to the tournament's All-Stars line-up.

2006 World Championships
The tournament was played in Stockholm, Sweden. Finland and Sweden met in the final in Stockholm Globe Arena. The match ended 7–6 to Sweden with Magnus Svensson scoring the deciding sudden death goal in overtime.

2008 World Championships
Finland finally won its first World Championships title after beating Sweden 7–6 in overtime, in a final match played in Prague, Czech Republic. The game-deciding goal was scored by Tero Tiitu. After losing to Sweden four times in earlier World Championships finals, Finland finally laid its hands on the coveted trophy as the team captain Mikael Järvi lifted the prize for the very first time in Finnish floorball history.

2010 World Championships
For the first time Finland came into the tournament as reigning world champions. The home games were held in Helsinki, Finland. As expected Finland met its nemesis Sweden in the final. Finland were the dominant team and took the title for the second time in front of a roaring home crowd. The final game ended 6–2 to Finland. Mika Kohonen scored a hat-trick in the game.

=== 2011 – present ===
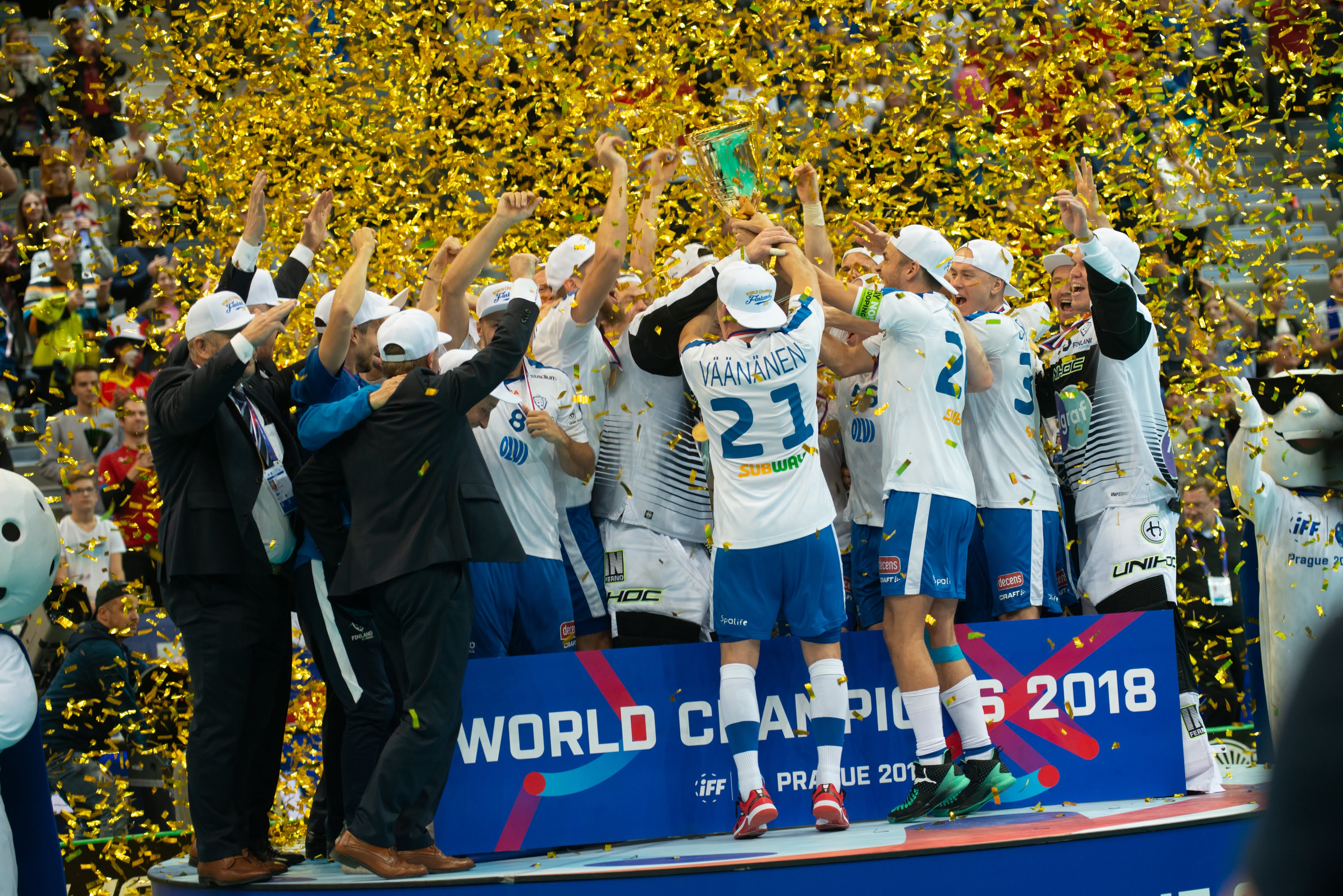
The Finnish men celebrating having become the 2018 world champions

2012 World Championships
The tournament was held in Switzerland and the two floorball juggernauts clashed again in the final game. Sweden totally devastated the Finnish side with quickly gaining a 9–0 lead. The game soon evened out, but with such an advantage given early on, Sweden coasted to victory with the final score being 11–5.

2014 World Championships
The 2014 World Championships were played in Gothenburg, Sweden in December 2014. Finland ended with silver.

2016 World Championships
World Championship tournament was held first time in Riga, Latvia. Finland and Sweden met in the final in Arena Riga. The match ended 4–3 to Finland and it took the title for the third time in penalty shootout.

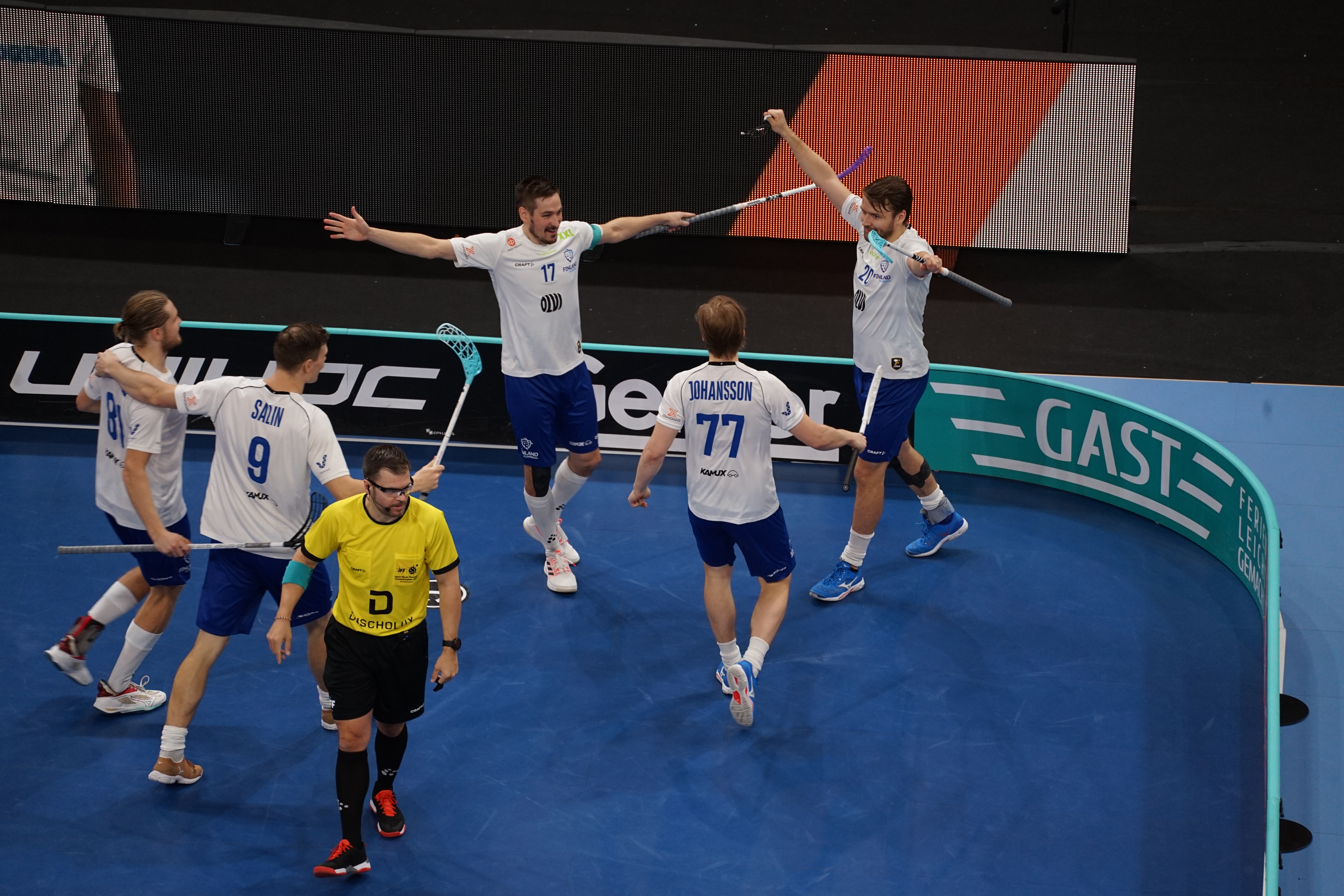
Finnish players celebrating a goal in the bronze medal game against Switzerland at the 2022 World Championship

2018 World Championships
The 2018 World Championships were played for the third time in Prague, Czech Republic. Finland met his neighbor Sweden in the finals. Finland won and took the title for the fourth time in the same place where they won the first title in 10 years ago.

2024 World Championships
Finland won their fifth World Championship, defeating hosts Sweden 5–4 in overtime having comeback from 0–4 behind.

== World championships ==
Year	Hosting Country	Rank	Final match
1996	Sweden	2nd place	Sweden 0–5
1998	Czech Republic	3rd place	Denmark 4–1
2000	Norway	2nd place	Sweden 3–5
2002	Finland	2nd place	Sweden 4–6
2004	Switzerland	3rd place	Switzerland 8–7 PS
2006	Sweden	2nd place	Sweden 6–7 OT
2008	Czech Republic	1st place	Sweden 7–6 OT
2010	Finland	1st place	Sweden 6–2
2012	Switzerland	2nd place	Sweden 5–11
2014	Sweden	2nd place	Sweden 2–3
2016	Latvia	1st place	Sweden 4–3 PS
2018	Czech Republic	1st place	Sweden 6–3
2020	Finland	2nd place	Sweden 4–6
2022	Switzerland	3rd place	Switzerland 5–3
2024	Sweden	1st place	Sweden 5–4 OT
2026	Finland		

== World Games ==
Year	Hosting Country	Rank	Final match
2017	Poland	3rd place	Czech Republic 2–0
2022	USA	2nd place	Sweden 5–6
2025	China	2nd place	Sweden 1–2
2029	Germany		

== European Championships ==
Year	Hosting Country	Rank	Final match
1994	Finland	2nd place	Sweden 1–4
1995	Switzerland	1st place	Sweden 3–2 PS

== Players and staff ==
=== Past rosters ===
2018 World Champions

- Goalkeepers:
  - Tomi Ikonen, Eero Kosonen
- Defenders:
  - Juha Kivilehto, Risto Töllikkö, Janne Lamminen, Nico Salo, Tatu Väänänen, Lauri Stenfors, Mikael Lax
- Forwards:
  - Jami Manninen, Eemeli Salin, Mika Moilanen, Miko Kailiala, Kari Koskelainen, Lauri Kapanen, Jani Kukkola, Oscar Hänninen, Rickie Hyvärinen, Mika Kohonen, Tero Tiitu
- Staff:
  - Petri Kettunen (Head coach), Mika Ahonen (Assistant coach), Akseli Ahtiainen (Assistant coach), Juha Jäntti (Assistant coach), Ari Haapalainen (Masseur), Aleksi Öhman (Physio), Jari Oksanen (Team manager), Juhani Henriksson (Media)

2010 World Champions

- Goalkeepers:
  - Jani Naumanen and Henri Toivoniemi.
- Defenders:
  - Markus Bollström, Juha Kivilehto, Mika Savolainen, Timo Toivonen, Jouni Vehkaoja and Tatu Väänänen.
- Forwards:
  - Harri Forsten, Rickie Hyvärinen, Oscar Hänninen, Henri Johansson, Esa Jussila, Mikael Järvi, Mika Kohonen, Mikko Kohonen, Jani Kukkola, Mika Moilanen, Tero Tiitu and Lassi Vänttinen.
- Staff:
  - Petteri Nykky (Head Coach), Juha Jäntti (Coach), Petri Kettunen (Coach), Harri Lehtonen, Kimmo Nurminen, Marko Pirhonen and Hannu Tuunainen.

2008 World Champions

- Goalkeepers:
  - Jani Naumanen and Henri Toivoniemi.
- Defenders:
  - Mika Kavekari, Tarmo Kirjonen, Saku Lehti, Vesa Punkari, Mika Savolainen and Jouni Vehkaoja.
- Forwards:
  - Harri Forsten, Rickie Hyvärinen, Esa Jussila, Mikael Järvi, Juho Järvinen, Mika Kohonen, Mikko Kohonen, Kari Koskelainen, Jani Kukkola, Santtu Manner, Tero Tiitu and Lassi Vänttinen.
- Staff:
  - Petteri Nykky (Head Coach), Juha Jäntti (Coach), Samu Kuitunen (Coach), Hexi Arteva, Petri Kanter, Antti Luhta and Antti Ylinen.

== Records ==
=== All-time World Championships record ===
Tournament	GP	W	D	L	GF	GA	+/-
Sweden 1996	7	6	0	1	66	10	+56
Czech Republic 1998	5	4	0	1	26	9	+17
Norway 2000	5	3	1	1	26	11	+15
Finland 2002	6	4	0	2	35	13	+22
Switzerland 2004	6	4	0	2	60	19	+41
Sweden 2006	6	5	0	1	61	15	+46
Czech Republic 2008	6	6	0	0	45	15	+30
Finland 2010	6	6	0	0	60	10	+50
Switzerland 2012	6	5	0	1	68	20	+48
Sweden 2014	6	4	0	2	32	15	+17
Latvia 2016	6	6	0	0	43	14	+29
Czech Republic 2018	6	5	0	1	39	13	+26
Finland 2020	6	5	0	1	33	14	+19
Switzerland 2022	6	4	0	2	39	18	+21
Sweden 2024	6	6	0	0	34	13	+21
Totals	89	73	1	15	677	209	+468

Updated 18 Dec 2024.

=== Individual records ===
- Most games played: 152
  - Mika Kohonen
- Most goals scored: 110
  - Tero Tiitu
- Most assists: 156
  - Mika Kohonen
- Most points: 233
  - Mika Kohonen
- Most penalty minutes: 53
  - Vesa Punkari

Updated 2 Dec 2014.
