= FC Helsingborg =

Floorball club in Helsingborg, Sweden

- FC Helsingborg
- Nickname(s): FCH
- Founded: 1979
- Arena: Helsingborg Arena
- Capacity: 4,700
- Manager: Juha Kivilehto
- Captain: Kristoffer Fält
- League: (Sweden) SSL
- Championships: 0
Home colors	Away colors

FC Helsingborg (Floorball Club Helsingborg), commonly FCH, is a Swedish professional floorball team from Helsingborg. The current club was formed in 2003 by a merging between the floorball section of Högaborgs BK and Ramlösa IBK. In the spring of 2003 the club separated with Högaborg and formed the standalone club FC Helsingborg. The team acquired Högaborgs place in the Elitserien (currently Swedish Super League.)

The team has played a total of 6 playoffs since the first time in the season of 2005/2006, were FCH was eliminated after losing 3:0 in a best-of-5 series against Pixbo IBK. The following season the team was eliminated after losing to Warberg IC with 8–5 in the 5th decisive game of the quarter-final series. After that the team was unable to secure a playoff-spot for the following two season. In 2009/2010, FCH was once again eliminated after losing the series 3:0 against Warberg IC in the quarter-finals. In the 2010/2011 season the team faced IBF Falun, and was eliminated after an overtime penalty-shootout in game 5. FCH did not qualify for playoffs during the 2012/2013 season.

FCH started the 2013/2014 season with a new head coach, Magnus Svensson, but opened the regular season poorly. Decision was made to take in former player Magnus Anderberg as new head coach. He led the team to the playoffs, where they were eliminated after losing 4:0 in games against Pixbo IBK, all of which were overtime losses.

The 2014/2015 season was the most successful in team franchise history. FCH finished 7th place in the table at the end of the regular season, and was picked to face Pixbo IBK in the quarter-finals. FCH won the series 4:2, but lost the semi-finals 4:1 in games against Linköping IBK. It was the first time in franchise history FCH had reached semi-finals, and the bronze was also the first since the introduction of a national floorball series.

On 23 November 2008, football legend Henrik Larsson made his debut for FCH against Jönköpings IK in front of 1 968 spectators. FCH won the game 7-6 after sudden-death. Henrik Larssons unexpected change of clubs caught huge attention in the media. He was noted for 9 games during the 2008/2009 season, scoring 4 assist and 1 goal, an empty-netter against Västerås IB. With that goal Larsson set the new league-record for longest time between goals in the highest league, 19 years between his 6th and 7th career goals. Larsson scored his first points for Viskan HBK during their time in the highest league in the fall of 1989.
