= 1998 Men's World Floorball Championships =

Floorball competition

Tournament details
- Host country: Czech Republic

Final positions
- Champions: Sweden
- Runners-up: Switzerland
- Third place: Finland

Awards
- MVP: (Sweden) Martin Olofsson

The 1998 Men's Floorball Championships was the second edition of Men's World Floorball Championship. It was the first time the championship was held in the Czech Republic, taking place in Prague and Brno from 25 to 31 May 1998. For the first time, the competing national teams were divided into performance divisions.

Group A matches were played at the old Vodova Arena in Brno. The remaining matches were hosted by Prague. The Královka Arena was used for Group B and B-Division matches, and the knockout stage took place at the Eden Ice Stadium.

As in the inaugural Men's World Championships, Sweden won again after defeating Switzerland in the final. For the Swiss, it was their only final appearance in history.

== Preliminary round ==
=== Group A ===
Team	Pld	W	D	L	GF	GA	GD	Pts
Sweden	3	3	0	0	35	0	+35	6
Switzerland	3	2	0	1	16	9	+7	4
Czech Republic	3	1	0	2	9	17	−8	2
Germany	3	0	0	3	0	34	−34	0

25 May 1998	Switzerland	0–9	Sweden	Sportovní hala Vodova (old hall), Brno

Czech Republic	9–0	Germany	Sportovní hala Vodova (old hall), Brno

26 May 1998	Sweden	14–0	Germany	Sportovní hala Vodova (old hall), Brno

Czech Republic	0–5	Switzerland	Sportovní hala Vodova (old hall), Brno

27 May 1998	Germany	0–11	Switzerland	Sportovní hala Vodova (old hall), Brno

Sweden	12–0	Czech Republic	Sportovní hala Vodova (old hall), Brno

=== Group B ===
Team	Pld	W	D	L	GF	GA	GD	Pts
Finland	3	3	0	0	18	3	+15	6
Denmark	3	1	1	1	9	7	+2	3
Norway	3	1	1	1	8	7	+1	3
Russia	3	0	0	3	3	21	−18	0

25 May 1998	Norway	2–2	Denmark	Královka Arena, Prague

Russia	1–10	Finland	Královka Arena, Prague

26 May 1998	Norway	6–1	Russia	Královka Arena, Prague

Finland	4–2	Denmark	Královka Arena, Prague

27 May 1998	Denmark	5–1	Russia	Královka Arena, Prague

Finland	4–0	Norway	Královka Arena, Prague

== Placement round ==
=== 7th place match ===
29 May 1998	Germany	2–6	Russia	Slavia, Prague

Game reference

=== 5th place match ===
29 May 1998	Czech Republic	4–5	Norway	Slavia, Prague

Game reference

== Playoffs ==
Semifinals
A1	Sweden	11
B2	Denmark	2
B1	Finland	4
A2	Switzerland	5

Finals
A1	Sweden	10
A2	Switzerland	3

=== Semifinals ===
29 May 1998	Sweden	11–2	Denmark	Slavia, Prague

Game reference

Finland	4–5	Switzerland	Slavia, Prague

Game reference

=== Bronze medal match ===
30 May 1998	Denmark	1–4	Finland	Slavia, Prague

Game reference

=== Championship match ===
30 May 1998	Sweden	10–3	Switzerland	Slavia, Prague

Game reference

== Leading scorers ==
Player		GP	G	A	PTS	PIM
(Sweden)	Magnus Augustsson	5	6	4	10	2
(Sweden)	Niklas Jihde	5	5	5	10	0
(Sweden)	Martin Olofsson	5	4	5	9	0
(Sweden)	Michael Östlund	5	4	5	9	0
(Sweden)	Christian Hellström	5	6	2	8	0
(Finland)	Mika Kohonen	5	6	2	8	2
(Switzerland)	Thomas Engel	5	6	2	8	2
(Sweden)	Klas Karlsson	5	2	6	8	0
(Sweden)	Mikael Gunnarzon	5	4	3	7	4
(Norway)	Petter Pettersen	4	1	6	7	2

== Awards and All-star team ==
- Goalkeeper: (Switzerland) Mark Wolf
- Defense: (Sweden) Klas Karlsson, (Sweden) Jan-Erik Vaara
- Forward: (Finland) Mika Kohonen, (Switzerland) Thomas Engel, (Sweden) Magnus Augustsson
- Most Valuable Player (MVP): (Sweden) Martin Olofsson

== Ranking ==
Official rankings according to the IFF:

Rk.	Team
1st place, gold medalist(s)	Sweden
2nd place, silver medalist(s)	Switzerland
3rd place, bronze medalist(s)	Finland
4.	Denmark
5.	Norway
6.	Czech Republic
7.	Russia
8.	Germany
