= Floorball at the World Games =

Floorball was contested at the 1997 World Games as an invitational sport. It returned to the World Games as an official sport in the 2017 edition. Only a men's tournament was featured in the 1997, 2017 and 2022 editions. Starting with the 2025 edition, a women's tournament is held too.

All four men's tournaments so far have been won by Sweden.

Finland won the inaugural women's tournament in 2025.

== Medalists ==
=== Men ===
Games	Gold	Silver	Bronze
1997 Lahti	Sweden	Finland	Switzerland
2017 Wroclaw	Sweden	Switzerland	Finland
2022 Birmingham	Sweden	Finland	Czech Republic
2025 Chengdu	Sweden	Finland	Czech Republic

=== Women ===
Games	Gold	Silver	Bronze
2025 Chengdu	Finland	Sweden	Switzerland

== Men's tournament ==
Year	Host	Gold Medal Match			Bronze Medal Match		
Year	Host	Gold	Score	Silver	Bronze	Score	Fourth place
1997; Details	(Finland); Lahti	Sweden	4 – 3	Finland	Switzerland	5 – 1	Latvia
2017; Details	(Poland); Wrocław	Sweden	7 – 5	Switzerland	Finland	2 – 0	Czech Republic
2022; Details	(United States); Birmingham	Sweden	6 – 5	Finland	Czech Republic	7 – 3	Latvia
2025; Details	(China); Chengdu	Sweden	2 – 1	Finland	Czech Republic	7 – 2	Switzerland

== Women's tournament ==
Year	Host	Gold Medal Match			Bronze Medal Match		
Year	Host	Gold	Score	Silver	Bronze	Score	Fourth place
2025; Details	(China); Chengdu	Finland	3 – 2	Sweden	Switzerland	4 – 3	Czech Republic

== See also ==
- Men's World Floorball Championship
- Women's World Floorball Championship
