= 2000 Men's World Floorball Championships =

Floorball competition

Tournament details
- Host country: Norway
- Venues: 3 (in 3 host cities)
- Dates: 14–21 May 2000
- Teams: 8

Final positions
- Champions: Sweden
- Runners-up: Finland
- Third place: Switzerland

Awards
- MVP: (Sweden) Martin Olofsson

The 2000 Men's World Floorball Championships was the third edition of Men's World Floorball Championship. It was held in Norway in the cities of Drammen, Oslo, and Sarpsborg from 14 to 21 May 2000.

As in all previous Men's World Championships, Sweden won for the third time after defeating Finland in the final.

== Preliminary round ==
=== Group A ===
Team	Pld	W	D	L	GF	GA	GD	Pts
Sweden	3	3	0	0	18	5	+13	6
Denmark	3	1	1	1	6	6	0	3
Norway	3	1	1	1	8	13	−5	3
Latvia	3	0	0	3	6	14	−8	0

Source: IFF

May 14, 2000

Norway	6–2	Latvia

Drammenshallen, Drammen

Sweden	3–2	Denmark

Sparta Amfi, Sarpsborg

May 16, 2000

Sweden	10–1	Norway

Sparta Amfi, Sarpsborg

Denmark	3–2	Latvia

Sparta Amfi, Sarpsborg

May 18, 2000

Norway	1–1	Denmark

Sparta Amfi, Sarpsborg

Latvia	2–5	Sweden

Sparta Amfi, Sarpsborg

=== Group B ===
Team	Pld	W	D	L	GF	GA	GD	Pts
Finland	3	2	1	0	17	5	+12	5
Switzerland	3	2	0	1	17	8	+9	4
Czech Republic	3	1	1	1	9	6	+3	3
Russia	3	0	0	3	2	26	−24	0

Source: IFF

May 15, 2000

Switzerland	3–5	Finland

Drammenshallen, Drammen

Czech Republic	5–1	Russia

Drammenshallen, Drammen

May 16, 2000

Finland	10–0	Russia

Drammenshallen, Drammen

Switzerland	3–2	Czech Republic

Drammenshallen, Drammen

May 18, 2000

Czech Republic	2–2	Finland

Drammenshallen, Drammen

Russia	1–11	Switzerland

Drammenshallen, Drammen

== Placement round ==
=== 7th place match ===
May 19, 2000	Russia	4–5	Latvia	Jordal Amfi, Oslo

Game reference

=== 5th place match ===
May 19, 2000	Norway	5–2	Czech Republic	Jordal Amfi, Oslo

Game reference

== Playoffs ==
Semifinals
A1	Sweden	8
B2	Switzerland	2
B1	Finland	6
A2	Denmark	1

Finals
A1	Sweden	5
B1	Finland	3

=== Semifinals ===
May 20, 2000	Sweden	8–2	Switzerland	Jordal Amfi, Oslo

Game reference

Finland	6–1	Denmark	Jordal Amfi, Oslo

Game reference

=== Bronze medal match ===
May 21, 2000	Switzerland	4–2	Denmark	Jordal Amfi, Oslo

Game reference

=== Championship match ===
May 21, 2000	Sweden	5–3	Finland	Jordal Amfi, Oslo

Game reference

== Leading scorers ==
Player		GP	G	A	PTS	PIM
(Finland)	Tero Karppanen	5	6	3	9	0
(Sweden)	Martin Olofsson	5	5	4	9	0
(Switzerland)	Daniel Telli	5	4	5	9	4
(Sweden)	Anders Hellgård	5	3	6	9	0
(Sweden)	Magnus Augustsson	5	5	3	8	0
(Sweden)	Jonathan Kronstrand	5	3	5	8	0
(Finland)	Mikael Järvi	5	5	2	7	2
(Finland)	Jaakko Hintikka	5	4	3	7	0
(Czech Republic)	Radim Cepek	4	4	3	7	4
(Norway)	Willy Fauskanger	4	5	1	6	0

== Awards and All-Star team ==
- Goalkeeper: (Denmark) Morten Andersen
- Defense: (Finland) Vesa Punkari, (Sweden) Johan Davidsson
- Forward: (Finland) Tero Karppanen, (Finland) Mika Kohonen, (Sweden) Martin Olofsson
- Most Valuable Player (MVP): (Sweden) Martin Olofsson

== Ranking ==
Official rankings according to the IFF:

Rk.	Team
1st place, gold medalist(s)	Sweden
2nd place, silver medalist(s)	Finland
3rd place, bronze medalist(s)	Switzerland
4.	Denmark
5.	Norway
6.	Czech Republic
7.	Latvia
8.	Russia
