= 2024 Men's World Floorball Championships =

Floorball competition

Tournament details
- Host country: Sweden
- Venues: 2 (in 1 host city)
- Dates: 7–15 December
- Teams: 16

Final positions
- Champions: Finland
- Runners-up: Sweden
- Third place: Czech Republic
- Fourth place: Latvia

Tournament statistics
- Matches played: 48

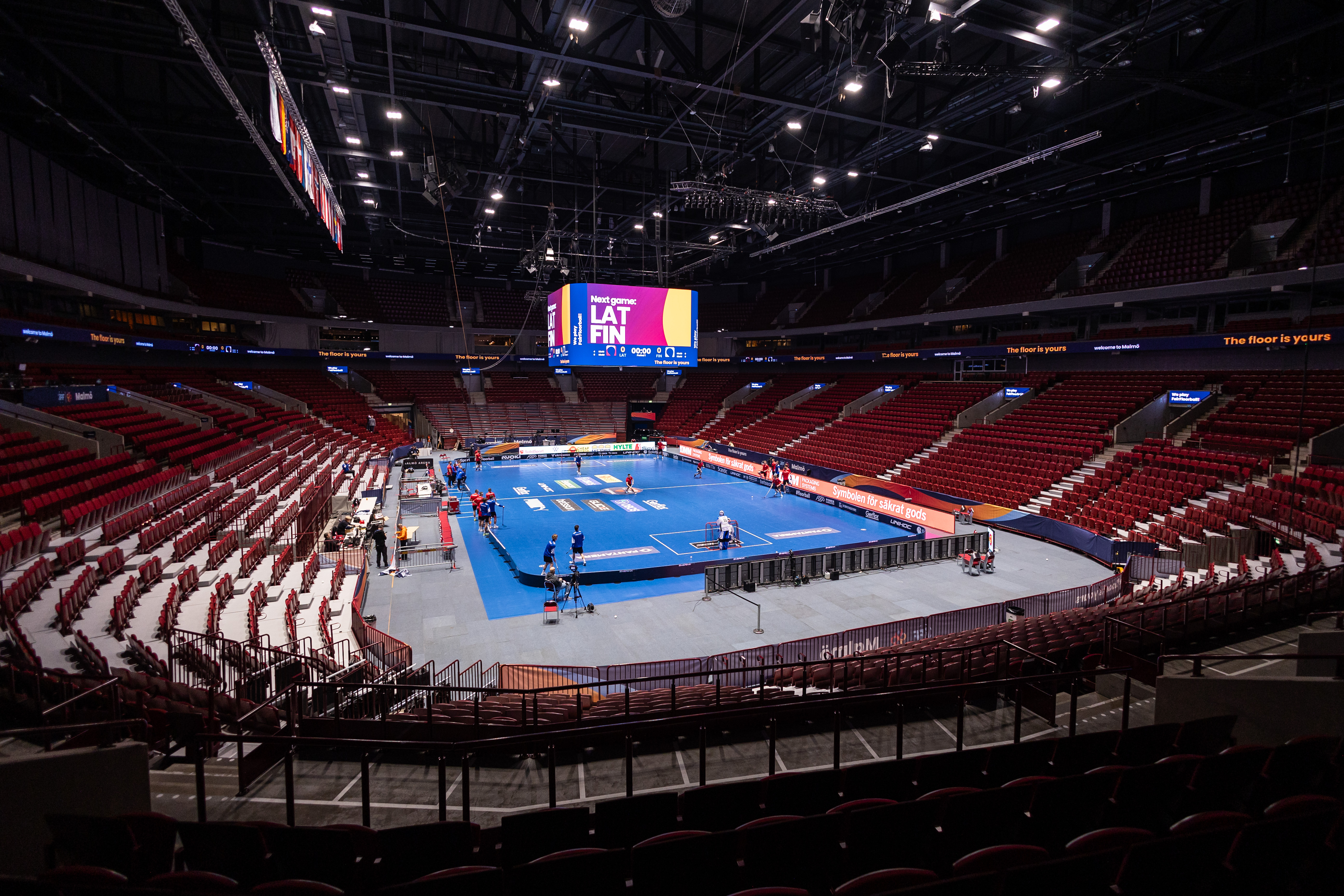
Malmö Arena ready for the first match of the tournament – Latvia vs. Finland

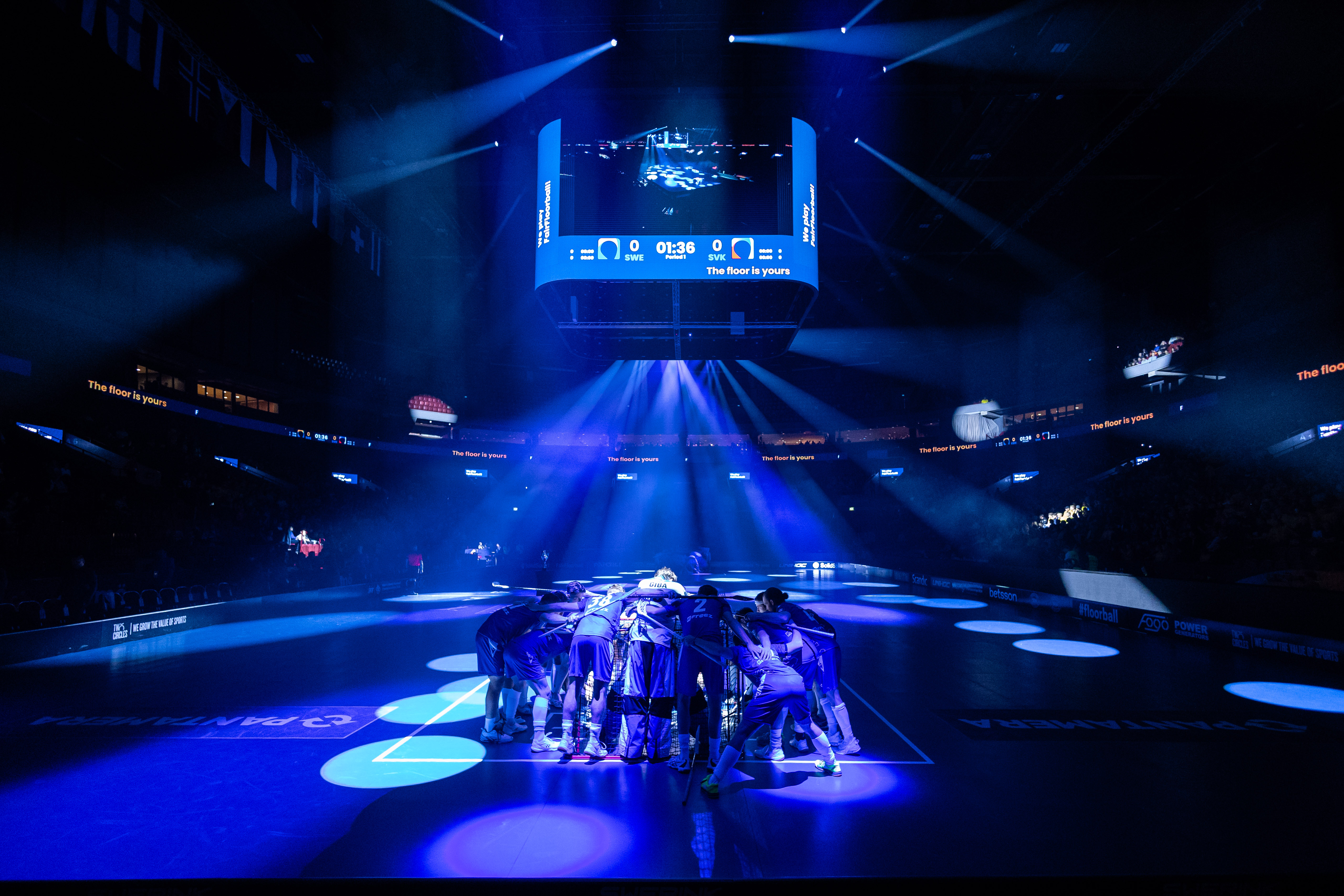
Malmö Arena before Sweden vs. Slovakia match

The 2024 Men's World Floorball Championships was the 15th World Championships in men's floorball. It was held from 7 to 15 December 2024 in Malmö, Sweden.

Sweden did not defend their two-time championship after losing to Finland in the finals 4–5 in overtime, after having led the game 4–0 at one stage in the match. Together with a loss against the Finns in a group game, these were the first ever defeats for Sweden on home turf. The Czech Republic for the first time won their group without losing a point. Unlike in the previous championship, however, Czechs did not make it past the semifinals and finished in third place after defeating Latvia.

Latvia knocked out Switzerland in the quarterfinals. This marked Latvia's first appearance in the semifinals of a world championship. It was the first time since the 2012 tournament that a team other than the Czech Republic, Finland, Sweden and Switzerland had reached the semifinals. Thanks to a strong result at the previous championship as well, Latvia rose to fourth place in the IFF rankings, becoming the first new country to do so in 23 years. It was the second time in history that Switzerland had not played for medals, the first time being at the first championship in 1996.

The championship also served as qualification for the 2025 World Games, with the five best European teams and the best Asian–Oceanian team from the main tournament qualifying, along with the only automatically qualified team from the Americas. These were the four European semifinalists, fifth-placed Switzerland, the Philippines, and Canada. The Philippines became the first Asian country to advance to the playoffs at the championship.

The tournament was criticised by sports journalists and players for poor promotion and consequently low attendance. The championship had less than half the attendance of the most successful Czech championship in 2018.

== Host selection ==
These two nations applied.

- Singapore
- Sweden

=== Evaluation report ===
Bids	Singapore	Sweden
Event	135/165	145/165
Financial	193/250	206/250
Delivery	340/450	334/450
Development	112/135	89/135
Overall	780/1000	774/1000
Budget	€2.43 million	€2.6 million
Tournament dates (score)	16–24 November (5/15)	7–15 December (15/15)

The bids were considered very closely matched and thus the evaluation report was considered a draw, although 9/12 people who are involved in different aspects of the IFF gave Singapore the edge.

Originally, the hosts were going to be announced in November 2020 but was postponed in order to learn more details about each bid. Sweden was given the hosting rights on 23 February 2021 after beating Singapore in a bidding process that the IFF called very close. The city had already hosted group stage of 2006 Championships.

== Qualification ==
The qualifiers were held in January, February and May 2024. Slovenia made their debut at a senior IFF tournament. Singapore was the only nation to not qualify having played at the 2022 edition.

	Date	Venue	Vacancies	Qualified
Host nation	24 May 2023		1	Sweden
European qualification 1	31 January–3 February	(Latvia) Liepāja	11	Estonia; Finland; Germany; Latvia
European qualification 2	1–4 February	(Poland) Łochów	11	Czech Republic; Norway; Poland; Slovakia
European qualification 3	31 January–4 February	(Slovenia) Škofja Loka	11	Denmark; Slovenia; Switzerland
Americas qualification	17–18 February	(Canada) Toronto	1	Canada
Asia-Oceania qualification	21–25 May	(Philippines) Pasig	3	Australia; Philippines; Thailand
Total			16	

Host Qualified Did not qualify

== Venues ==
Both venues are situated in Malmö.

Malmö		2024 Men's World Floorball Championships is located in Southern Sweden
Malmö Arena; Capacity: 12,600	Baltiska Hallen; Capacity: 3,600	2024 Men's World Floorball Championships is located in Southern Sweden

== Final draw ==
The draw took place on 5 March 2024 at the Turning Torso in Malmö, Sweden. The placeholder name the Asian and Oceanian teams would inherit was based on their world ranking, rather than their position in the Asian Championship.

Pot 1	Pot 2	Pot 3	Pot 4
Sweden (1) (H); Czech Republic (2); Finland (3); Switzerland (4)	Latvia (5); Slovakia (6); Norway (7); Germany (8)	Estonia (9); Denmark (10); Poland (11); Canada (12)	Asia-Oceania 1 (Note: This spot was inherited by Australia.) (13); Asia-Oceania 2 (Note: This spot was inherited by Thailand.) (14); Asia-Oceania 3 (Note: This spot was inherited by Philippines.) (15); Slovenia (18)

=== Draw ===
Group A
Pos	Team
A1	Czech Republic
A2	Switzerland
A3	Germany
A4	Norway

Group B
Pos	Team
B1	Finland
B2	Sweden
B3	Latvia
B4	Slovakia

Group C
Pos	Team
C1	Canada
C2	Estonia
C3	Australia
C4	Philippines

Group D
Pos	Team
D1	Denmark
D2	Poland
D3	Slovenia
D4	Thailand

== Referees ==
Seven referee pairs were selected on 5 September 2024.

Referees
Czech Republic	Tomáš Kostinek and Martin Reichelt
Denmark	Steffen Leholk and Tobias Schmidt
Finland	Thomas Ellis and Janne Sjögren
Singapore	Sharil Ismail and Oswind Rosayro
Sweden	Simon Broman and Martin Matti
Sweden	Thomas Andersson and Rickard Wissman
Switzerland	Josef Fässler and Benjamin Schläpfer

== Tournament format ==
After the group ballot, 16 teams were divided into four groups. In the group stage each team played each other once, while the second stage of the event included play-offs and placement matches.

The two best teams of group A and B went directly to the quarter-finals. Teams placed third and fourth in group A and B and the teams placed first and second in group C and D went into the first play-off round (played before the quarter-finals).

== Preliminary round ==
=== Group A ===
Pos	Team	Pld	W	D	L	GF	GA	GD	Pts	Qualification
1	Czech Republic	3	3	0	0	21	4	+17	6	Quarterfinals
2	Switzerland	3	1	1	1	14	11	+3	3	Quarterfinals
3	Germany	3	1	0	2	10	20	−10	2	Play-off round
4	Norway	3	0	1	2	9	19	−10	1	Play-off round

Source: IFF

7 December 2024; 18:30	Norway	2–7 (0–4, 1–2, 1–1)	Czech Republic	Malmö Arena, Malmö; Attendance: 1,112

Game reference

8 December 2024; 11:30	Germany	2–8 (0–1, 1–6, 1–1)	Switzerland	Malmö Arena, Malmö; Attendance: 2,038

Game reference

9 December 2024; 12:30	Norway	3–8 (1–2, 1–4, 1–2)	Germany	Malmö Arena, Malmö; Attendance: 1,187

Game reference

9 December 2024; 16:00	Czech Republic	5–2 (1–0, 0–1, 4–1)	Switzerland	Malmö Arena, Malmö; Attendance: 1,089

Game reference

10 December 2024; 16:00	Czech Republic	9–0 (5–0, 2–0, 2–0)	Germany	Baltic Hall, Malmö; Attendance: 173

Game reference

10 December 2024; 16:00	Switzerland	4–4 (1–1, 1–1, 2–2)	Norway	Malmö Arena, Malmö; Attendance: 2,325

Game reference

=== Group B ===
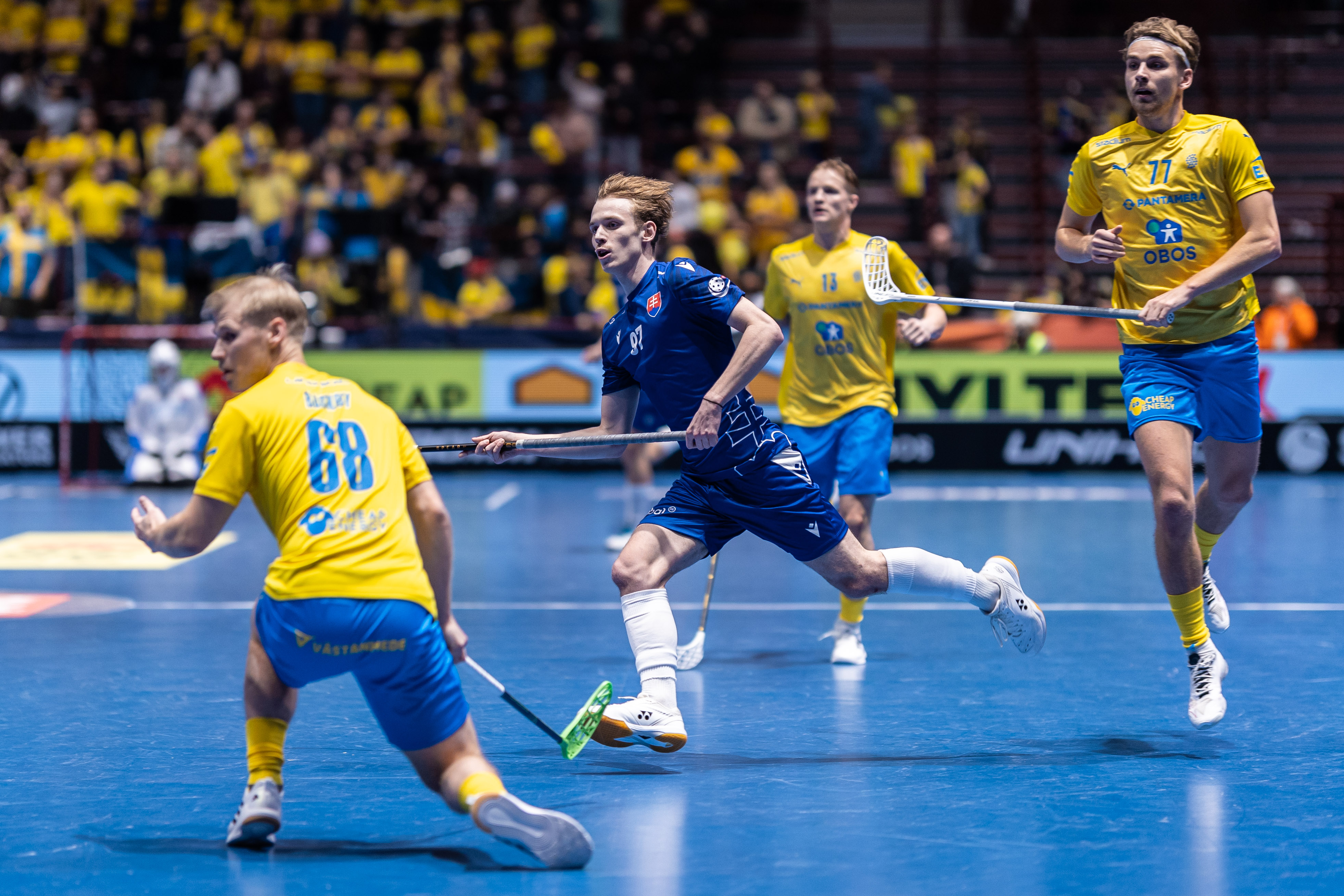
Sweden vs Slovakia match

Pos	Team	Pld	W	D	L	GF	GA	GD	Pts	Qualification
1	Finland	3	3	0	0	16	6	+10	6	Quarterfinals
2	Sweden	3	2	0	1	27	11	+16	4	Quarterfinals
3	Latvia	3	0	1	2	9	21	−12	1	Play-off round
4	Slovakia	3	0	1	2	9	23	−14	1	Play-off round

Source: IFF

7 December 2024; 11:30	Latvia	3–4 (1–0, 0–1, 2–3)	Finland	Malmö Arena, Malmö; Attendance: 3,431

Game reference

7 December 2024; 14:30	Sweden	12–4 (3–2, 3–1, 6–1)	Slovakia	Malmö Arena, Malmö; Attendance: 6,023

Game reference

8 December 2024; 14:30	Sweden	13–2 (2–0, 4–1, 7–1)	Latvia	Malmö Arena, Malmö; Attendance: 4,979

Game reference

8 December 2024; 18:15	Slovakia	1–7 (0–1, 1–2, 0–4)	Finland	Baltic Hall, Malmö; Attendance: 229

Game reference

9 December 2024; 19:00	Slovakia	4–4 (2–2, 0–1, 2–1)	Latvia	Baltic Hall, Malmö; Attendance: 146

Game reference

10 December 2024; 19:00	Finland	5–2 (0–1, 2–0, 3–1)	Sweden	Malmö Arena, Malmö; Attendance: 6,197

Game reference

=== Group C ===
Pos	Team	Pld	W	D	L	GF	GA	GD	Pts	Qualification
1	Estonia	3	3	0	0	20	11	+9	6	Play-off round
2	Philippines	3	2	0	1	15	11	+4	4	Play-off round
3	Australia	3	0	1	2	12	18	−6	1	13–16th place play-off
4	Canada	3	0	1	2	13	20	−7	1	13–16th place play-off

Source: IFF

7 December 2024; 11:00	Estonia	5–3 (2–2, 0–1, 3–0)	Australia	Baltic Hall, Malmö; Attendance: 257

Game reference

8 December 2024; 11:00	Estonia	9–3 (3–1, 3–0, 3–2)	Canada	Baltic Hall, Malmö; Attendance: 193

Game reference

8 December 2024; 14:00	Australia	2–6 (2–0, 0–3, 0–3)	Philippines	Baltic Hall, Malmö; Attendance: 317

Game reference

9 December 2024; 09:30	Australia	7–7 (2–3, 2–3, 3–1)	Canada	Malmö Arena, Malmö; Attendance: 1,449

Game reference

9 December 2024; 13:45	Philippines	5–6 (1–3, 3–2, 1–1)	Estonia	Baltic Hall, Malmö; Attendance: 377

Game reference

10 December 2024; 11:00	Canada	3–4 (0–1, 1–1, 2–2)	Philippines	Baltic Hall, Malmö; Attendance: 216

Game reference

=== Group D ===
Pos	Team	Pld	W	D	L	GF	GA	GD	Pts	Qualification
1	Denmark	3	3	0	0	28	11	+17	6	Play-off round
2	Poland	3	1	1	1	15	16	−1	3	Play-off round
3	Slovenia	3	0	2	1	12	19	−7	2	13–16th place play-off
4	Thailand	3	0	1	2	11	20	−9	1	13–16th place play-off

Source: IFF

7 December 2024; 14:00	Poland	5–4 (1–0, 2–3, 2–1)	Thailand	Baltic Hall, Malmö; Attendance: 314

Game reference

7 December 2024; 18:30	Denmark	10–3 (3–1, 3–1, 4–1)	Slovenia	Baltic Hall, Malmö; Attendance: 892

Game reference

8 December 2024; 18:00	Thailand	2–10 (0–2, 0–4, 2–4)	Denmark	Malmö Arena, Malmö; Attendance: 823

Game reference

9 December 2024; 11:00	Slovenia	5–5 (2–3, 0–0, 3–2)	Thailand	Baltic Hall, Malmö; Attendance: 202

Game reference

9 December 2024; 19:00	Poland	6–8 (1–3, 2–1, 3–4)	Denmark	Malmö Arena, Malmö; Attendance: 1,124

Game reference

10 December 2024; 12:30	Slovenia	4–4 (1–0, 1–2, 2–2)	Poland	Malmö Arena, Malmö; Attendance: 1,003

Game reference

== Knock-out stage ==
Play-off; 11 December
B4	Slovakia	9
C1	Estonia	5
A3	Germany	10
D2	Poland	2
A4	Norway	3
D1	Denmark	2
B3	Latvia	14
C2	Philippines	3

Quarterfinals; 12–13 December
A1	Czech Republic	9
Slovakia	1
B2	Sweden	5
Germany	2
B1	Finland	6
Norway	1
A2	Switzerland	3
Latvia	4

Semifinals; 14 December
Czech Republic	1
Sweden	6
Finland	7
Latvia	2

Final; 15 December
Sweden	4
Finland	5
Third place
Czech Republic	8
Latvia	2

=== Play-off ===
11 December 2024; 9:30	Germany	10–2 (4–0, 2–0, 4–2)	Poland	Malmö Arena, Malmö; Attendance: 3,249

Game reference

11 December 2024; 12:30	Latvia	14–3 (4–1, 5–0, 5–2)	Philippines	Malmö Arena, Malmö; Attendance: 923

Game reference

11 December 2024; 16:00	Norway	3–2 (0–2, 3–0, 0–0)	Denmark	Malmö Arena, Malmö; Attendance: 679

Game reference

11 December 2024; 19:00	Slovakia	9–5 (4–1, 4–2, 1–2)	Estonia	Malmö Arena, Malmö; Attendance: 223

Game reference

=== Quarterfinals ===
12 December 2024; 20:30	Czech Republic	9–1 (6–0, 1–0, 2–1)	Slovakia	Malmö Arena, Malmö; Attendance: 1,087

Game reference

12 December 2024; 17:30	Sweden	5–2 (1–1, 1–0, 3–1)	Germany	Malmö Arena, Malmö; Attendance: 3,567

Game reference

13 December 2024; 16:00	Switzerland	3–4 OT (1–2, 2–0, 0–1); OT: 0–1	Latvia	Malmö Arena, Malmö; Attendance: 3,657

Game reference

13 December 2024; 19:10	Finland	6–1 (3–1, 1–0, 2–0)	Norway	Malmö Arena, Malmö; Attendance: 2,943

Game reference

=== Semifinals ===
14 December 2024; 16:00	Czech Republic	1–6 (0–2, 0–1, 1–3)	Sweden	Malmö Arena, Malmö; Attendance: 8,297

Game reference

14 December 2024; 19:10	Finland	7–2 (0–0, 7–0, 0–2)	Latvia	Malmö Arena, Malmö; Attendance: 6,033

Game reference

=== Bronze medal game ===
15 December 2024; 12:50	Czech Republic	8–2 (2–1, 3–1, 3–0)	Latvia	Malmö Arena, Malmö; Attendance: 6,241

Game reference

=== Final ===
15 December 2024; 15:50	Sweden	4–5 OT (3–0, 1–2, 0–2); OT: 0–1	Finland	Malmö Arena, Malmö; Attendance: 10,124

Game reference

== Placement matches ==
=== 5th place bracket ===
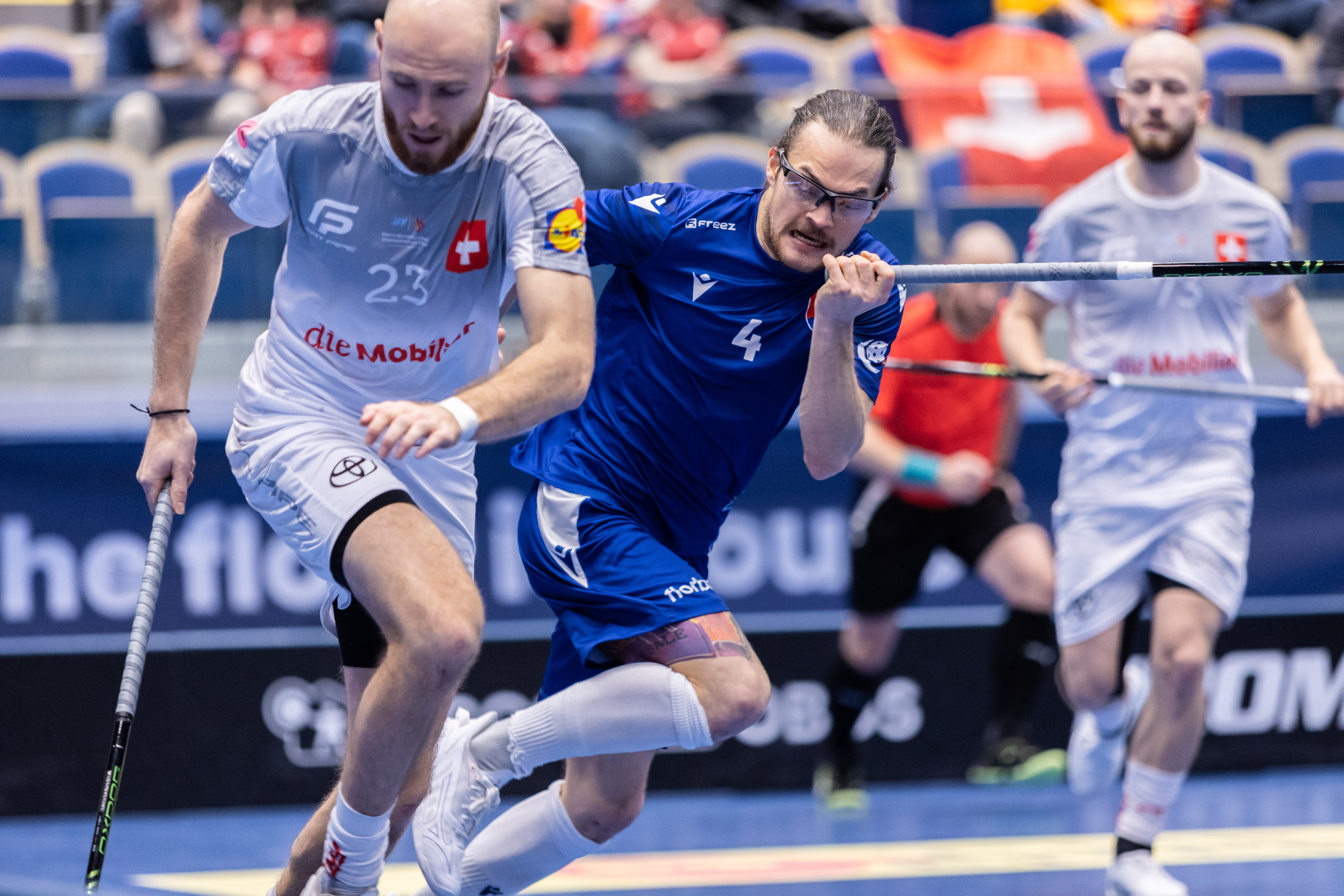
Fifth-place match Slovakia vs Switzerland

5th–8th place semi-finals
14 December
Slovakia	4
Germany	1
14 December
Norway	0
Switzerland	6

5th place
15 December
Slovakia	3
Switzerland	6
7th place
15 December
Germany	5
Norway	12

=== 5th–8th place semi-finals ===
14 December 2024; 11:00	Norway	0–6 (0–3, 0–1, 0–2)	Switzerland	Baltiska Hallen, Malmö; Attendance: 1231

Game reference

14 December 2024; 14:00	Slovakia	4–1 (1–0, 1–1, 2–0)	Germany	Baltiska Hallen, Malmö; Attendance: 244

Game reference

=== 7th place match ===
15 December 2024; 9:30	Germany	5–12 (3–2, 0–5, 2–5)	Norway	Baltiska Hallen, Malmö; Attendance: 357

Game reference

=== 5th place match ===
15 December 2024; 12:30	Slovakia	3–6 (2–2, 1–1, 0–3)	Switzerland	Baltiska Hallen, Malmö; Attendance: 1227

Game reference

=== 9th place bracket ===
9th–12th place semi-finals
12 December
Philippines	2
Denmark	10
12 December
Poland	3
Estonia	6

9th place
13 December
Denmark	2
Estonia	3 (OT)
11th place
13 December
Philippines	9 (OT)
Poland	8

=== 9th–12th place semi-finals ===
12 December 2024; 10:45	Poland	3–6 (0–2, 1–1, 2–3)	Estonia	Baltiska Hallen, Malmö; Attendance: 217

Game reference

12 December 2024; 11:00	Philippines	2–10 (1–4, 0–1, 1–5)	Denmark	Malmö Arena, Malmö; Attendance: 758

Game reference

=== 11th place match ===
13 December 2024; 10:45	Philippines	9–8 OT (2–4, 3–3, 3–1); OT: 1–0	Poland	Baltiska Hallen, Malmö; Attendance: 225

Game reference

=== 9th place match ===
13 December 2024; 13:45	Denmark	2–3 OT (0–0, 1–1, 1–1); OT: 0–1	Estonia	Baltiska Hallen, Malmö; Attendance: 107

Game reference

=== 13th place bracket ===
13th–16th place semi-finals
11 December
Slovenia	8
Canada	4
11 December
Australia	4
Thailand	5 (OT)

13th place
12 December
Slovenia	6
Thailand	4
15th place
12 December
Canada	6
Australia	9

=== 13th–16 place semifinals ===
11 December 2024; 10:45	Slovenia	8–4 (2–3, 3–0, 3–1)	Canada	Baltiska Hallen, Malmö; Attendance: 263

Game reference

11 December 2024; 13:45	Australia	4–5 OT (2–2, 2–0, 0–2); OT: 0–1	Thailand	Baltiska Hallen, Malmö; Attendance: 210

Game reference

=== 15th place bracket ===
12 December 2024; 13:45	Canada	6–9 (2–3, 0–1, 4–5)	Australia	Baltiska Hallen, Malmö; Attendance: 185

Game reference

=== 13th place bracket ===
12 December 2024; 14:00	Slovenia	6–4 (3–2, 1–0, 2–2)	Thailand	Malmö Arena, Malmö; Attendance: 209

Game reference

== Ranking and statistics ==
=== Final ranking ===
The official IFF final ranking of the tournament:

Gold medal	Finland
Silver medal	Sweden
Bronze medal	Czech Republic
4	Latvia
5	Switzerland
6	Slovakia
7	Norway
8	Germany
9	Estonia
10	Denmark
11	Philippines
12	Poland
13	Slovenia
14	Thailand
15	Australia
16	Canada

=== All-star team ===
Tournament all-star team:

- Best goalkeeper: (Sweden) Jon Hedlund
- Best defenders: (Czech Republic) Ondřej Němeček, (Finland) Miska Mäkinen
- Best center: (Sweden) Hampus Ahrén
- Best forwards: (Finland) Aaro Astala, (Sweden) Malte Lundmark
- Most valuable player: (Sweden) Malte Lundmark

=== Qualification for the 2025 World Games ===
#	Europe	Asia-Oceania	Americas
1	Finland	Philippines	Canada
2	Sweden		
3	Czech Republic		
4	Latvia		
5	Switzerland		

== Marketing ==
=== Tickets ===
The first tickets sales for the competition started in November 2022 with tickets for select days being made available for purchase. All tickets were put on sale on 27 March 2024.

=== Preparation ===
The logo was revealed on 13 February 2023, with the slogan The floor is yours. Älgvis (a homophone for Elvis), an elk with antlers made of floorball blades, was unveiled as the mascot for the competition on 24 November 2024; he will also serve as the future mascot of the Swedish Floorball Federation.
