= 1996 Men's World Floorball Championships =

Floorball competition

Tournament details
- Host country: Sweden
- Venues: 3 (in 3 host cities)
- Teams: 12

Final positions
- Champions: Sweden (1st title)
- Runners-up: Finland
- Third place: Norway

Tournament statistics
- Scoring leader(s): (Sweden) Martin Olofsson (16 points)

The 1996 Men's Floorball Championships were the first World Championships in men's floorball. It was held in Sweden in the cities of Stockholm, Skellefteå, and Uppsala. It followed the two previous editions of the European Championships. The only non-European team at the tournament was Singapore.

Sweden won after defeating Finland in the final. In the bronze medal match, Norway defeated the Czech Republic. To this day (2026), this is the only Men's World Championship in history where a country other than the quartet of Sweden, Finland, Switzerland, and the Czech Republic won a medal. Until 2024, it was also the only championship in which Switzerland did not reach the semifinals.

== Preliminary round ==
=== Group A ===
Venue: Skellefteå, Sweden

Team	Pld	W	D	L	GF	GA	GD	Pts
Sweden	5	5	0	0	65	3	+62	10
Norway	5	3	1	1	33	16	+17	7
Switzerland	5	3	1	1	35	19	+16	7
Denmark	5	2	0	3	20	28	−8	4
Latvia	5	1	0	4	8	47	−39	2
Estonia	5	0	0	5	3	51	−48	0

11 May 1996
Denmark	6–2	Latvia
Estonia	0–10	Switzerland
Sweden	9–2	Norway
12 May 1996
Sweden	8–0	Estonia
Norway	17–0	Latvia
Denmark	5–7	Switzerland
13 May 1996
Switzerland	0–9	Sweden
Norway	6–2	Denmark
Latvia	4–1	Estonia
14 May 1996
Latvia	1–18	Sweden
Switzerland	4–4	Norway
Estonia	1–7	Denmark
15 May 1996
Sweden	12–0	Denmark
Switzerland	14–1	Latvia
Norway	13–1	Estonia

=== Group B ===
Venue: Uppsala, Sweden

Team	Pld	W	D	L	GF	GA	GD	Pts
Finland	5	5	0	0	62	4	+58	10
Czech Republic	5	4	0	1	42	10	+32	8
Russia	5	3	0	2	45	23	+22	6
Germany	5	2	0	3	23	18	+5	4
Hungary	5	1	0	4	14	45	−31	2
Singapore	5	0	0	5	3	89	−86	0

11 May 1996
Finland	30–0	Singapore
Germany	3–7	Russia
Czech Republic	6–2	Hungary
12 May 1996
Russia	21–0	Singapore
Hungary	1–15	Finland
Germany	1–5	Czech Republic
13 May 1996
Russia	2–9	Czech Republic
Singapore	2–7	Hungary
Finland	3–0	Germany
14 May 1996
Czech Republic	2–4	Finland
Russia	14–1	Hungary
Singapore	0–11	Germany
15 May 1996
Finland	10–1	Russia
Singapore	1–20	Czech Republic
Hungary	3–8	Germany

== Placement round ==
=== 11th Place match ===
16 May 1996	Singapore	1–10	Estonia	Uppsala, Sweden

Game reference

=== 9th Place match ===
16 May 1996	Latvia	7–4	Hungary	Uppsala, Sweden

Game reference

=== 7th Place match ===
16 May 1996	Germany	1–2	Denmark	Uppsala, Sweden

Game reference

=== 5th Place match ===
16 May 1996	Switzerland	8–3	Russia	Uppsala, Sweden

Game reference

== Final round ==
Semifinals
A1	Sweden	13
B2	Czech Republic	0
B1	Finland	4
A2	Norway	1

Finals
A1	Sweden	5
B1	Finland	0

=== Semifinals ===
17 May 1996	Sweden	13–0	Czech Republic	Globe Arena, Stockholm

Game reference

Finland	4–1	Norway	Globe Arena, Stockholm

Game reference

=== Bronze Medal match ===
18 May 1996	Norway	6–2	Czech Republic	Globe Arena, Stockholm

Game reference

=== Championship match ===
18 May 1996	Sweden	5–0	Finland	Globe Arena, Stockholm

Game reference

== Leading scorers ==
Player		GP	G	A	PTS	PIM
(Sweden)	Martin Olofsson	7	11	5	16	0
(Czech Republic)	Vladimír Fuchs	6	6	9	15	0
(Russia)	Andrei Kobelev	6	8	6	14	2
(Sweden)	Christian Hellström	7	8	5	13	0
(Sweden)	Michael Östlund	7	7	6	13	0
(Russia)	Timofei Andreev	6	6	7	13	0
(Finland)	Akseli Ahtiainen	6	6	7	13	0
(Russia)	Igor Zhilinski	6	6	7	13	2
(Finland)	Jari Pekkola	7	5	8	13	2
(Finland)	Mika Sandell	7	11	1	12	0

== All-Star team ==
- Goalkeeper: (Sweden) Stefan Mattsson
- Defense: (Finland) Jari-Pekka Lehtonen, (Sweden) Jonas Eriksson
- Forward: (Sweden) Christian Hellström, (Switzerland) Andrea Engel, (Sweden) Martin Olofsson

== Ranking ==
Official rankings according to the IFF:

Rk.	Team
1st place, gold medalist(s)	Sweden
2nd place, silver medalist(s)	Finland
3rd place, bronze medalist(s)	Norway
4.	Czech Republic
5.	Switzerland
6.	Russia
7.	Denmark
8.	Germany
9.	Latvia
10.	Hungary
11.	Estonia
12.	Singapore
