= Victor Johansson (ice hockey) =

Swedish ice hockey player (born 2006)

- Born: 25 April 2006 (age 19) Linköping, Sweden
- Height: 6 ft 1 in (185 cm)
- Weight: 165 lb (75 kg; 11 st 11 lb)
- Position: Defence
- Shoots: Left
- SHL team: Leksands IF
- NHL draft: 120th overall, 2024; Toronto Maple Leafs
- Playing career: 2025–present

Victor Johansson (born 25 April 2006) is a Swedish professional ice hockey defenceman for Leksands IF of the Swedish Hockey League (SHL). Johansson was drafted 120th overall by the Toronto Maple Leafs in the 2024 NHL entry draft.

== International play ==
Medal record

Representing Sweden

Ice hockey

World Junior Championships
Gold medal – first place	2026 United States	

In December 2025, he was selected to represent Sweden at the 2026 World Junior Ice Hockey Championships. Johansson went scoreless in five games and won a gold medal. This was Sweden's first gold medal at the IIHF World Junior Championship since 2012.

== Personal life ==
Johansson in the son of manager and retired ice hockey player Thomas Johansson, and younger brother of ice hockey players Simon and Anton.
