= 2022 Men's World Floorball Championships =

Floorball competition

Tournament details
- Host country: Switzerland
- Venues: 2 (in 2 host cities)
- Dates: 5–13 November 2022
- Teams: 16

Final positions
- Champions: Sweden
- Runners-up: Czech Republic
- Third place: Finland

Tournament statistics
- Matches played: 48
- Goals scored: 588 (12.25 per match)
- Attendance: 155,485 (3,239 per match)
- Scoring leader(s): (Denmark) Mathias Glass (23 points)

Awards
- MVP: (Sweden) Alexander Galante Carlström

The 2022 Men's World Floorball Championships was the 14th edition of Men's World Floorball Championship. The tournament was held in Switzerland in the cities of Zurich and Winterthur, specifically at the Swiss Life Arena and AXA Arena. Due to a scheduling conflict with the 2022 FIFA World Cup, this championship was played from 5 to 13 November 2022, instead of the traditional December.

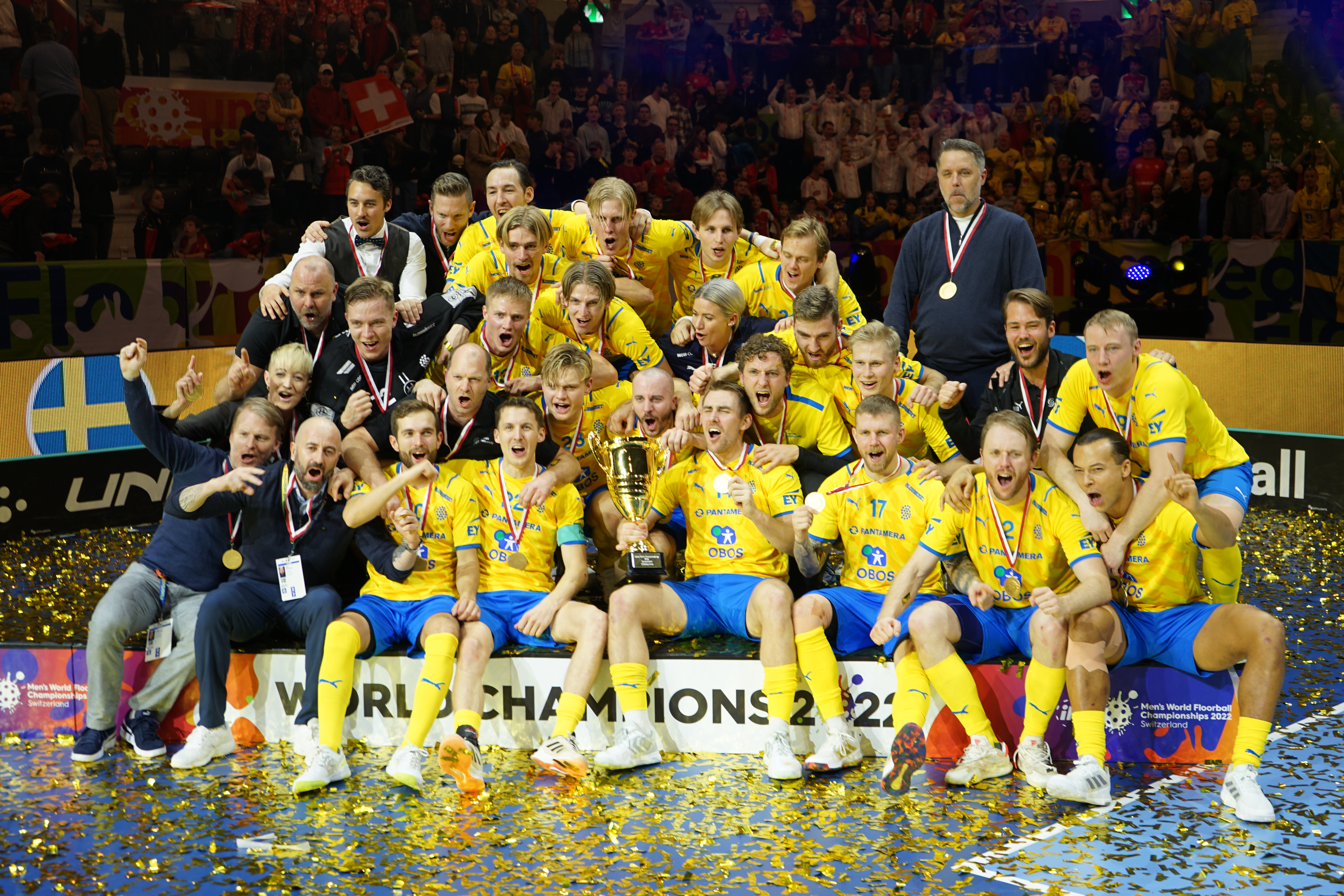
Swedish team celebrating the title.

The tournament was played in Zurich and Winterthur, Switzerland, and took place during 5–13 November 2022.

Sweden won their tenth championship title overall and second in a row after defeating the Czechia. For the Czech team, it was their second appearance in the final, 18 years after the 2004 championship. In addition, the Czechs drew with Sweden in the group stage for the first time in World Championship history, and earned three spots on the All-Star team for the first time. Finland earned the bronze after defeating Switzerland.

== Qualification ==
Host Qualified Did not qualify

36 teams registered for the 14th IFF Men's World Floorball Championships. 16 have qualified to reach to the final championship. Host country, Switzerland, qualified automatically. Ivory Coast has participated in the European qualifiers for the second time in a row, remaining the only team from Africa to have ever participated in the World Floorball Championship Qualifiers. Malaysia was the lone nation to register in 2020 but failed to do so in 2022. Philippines registered in 2020, but was not able to participate due to the COVID-19 pandemic, and did so for the first time in 2022. However both China and India ultimately did not compete in the Asia-Oceania qualifiers.

	Date	Venue	Vacancies	Qualified
Host nation			1	Switzerland
Asia-Oceania Qualification	31 May – 5 June 2022	Singapore	4	Philippines; Thailand; Australia; Singapore
European Qualification 1	25 – 28 May 2022	(Latvia) Valmiera	10	Finland; Latvia; Denmark; Estonia; Sweden; Norway; Poland; Slovakia; Czech Republic; Germany
European Qualification 2	25 – 28 May 2022	(Latvia) Kocēni	10	Finland; Latvia; Denmark; Estonia; Sweden; Norway; Poland; Slovakia; Czech Republic; Germany
European Qualification 3	23 – 27 May 2022	(Italy) Celano	10	Finland; Latvia; Denmark; Estonia; Sweden; Norway; Poland; Slovakia; Czech Republic; Germany
Americas Qualification	29 – 30 April 2022	(United States) Arlington	1	Canada
Total				16

== Venues ==
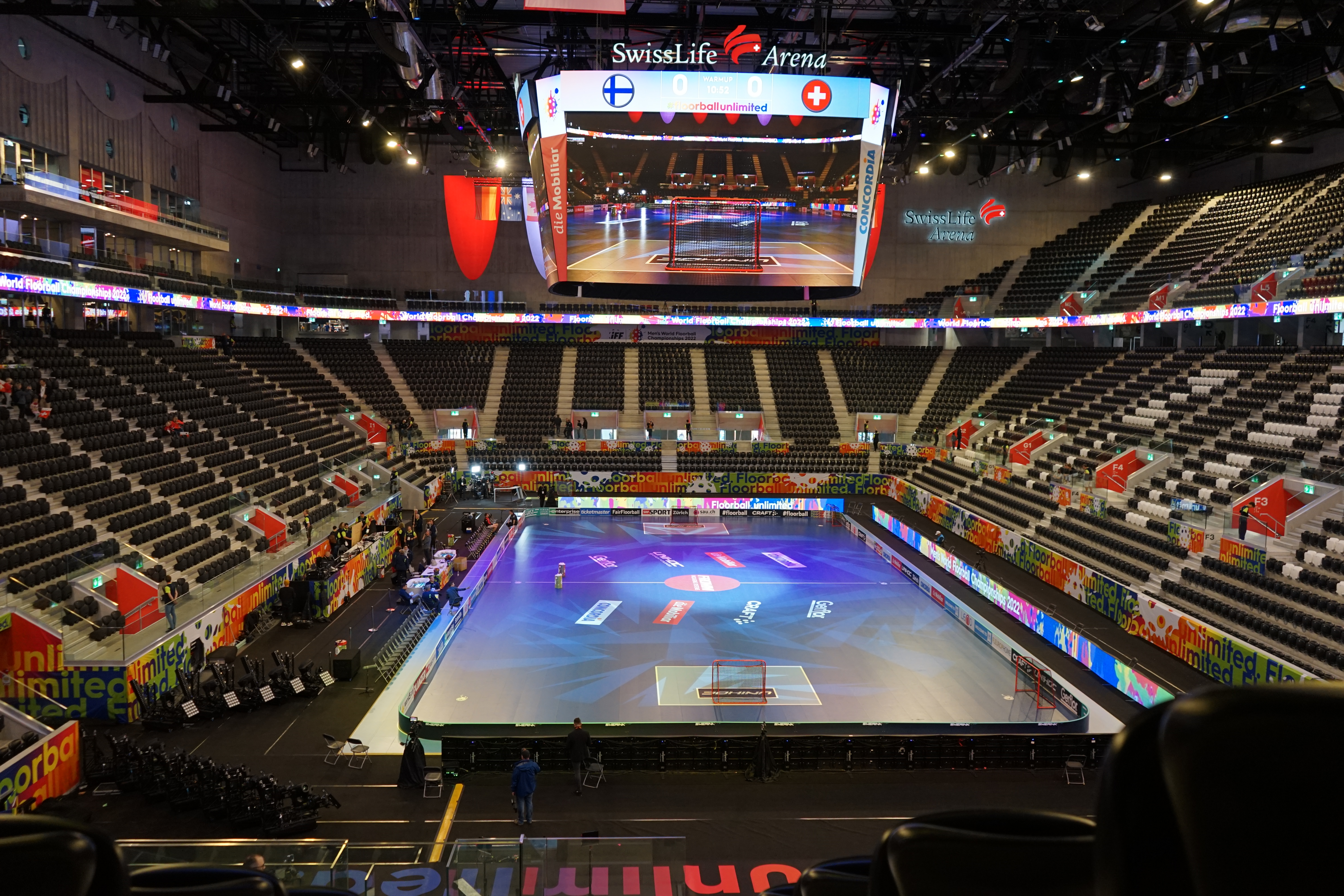
Swiss Life Arena was the venue of the 2022 World Championships.

Zurich	Winterthur
Swiss Life Arena	AXA Arena

== Draw ==
The draw took place on 8 June 2022 in Zurich, Switzerland.

Pot 1	Pot 2	Pot 3	Pot 4
Sweden (1); Finland(2); Czech Republic (3); Switzerland (hosts) (4)	Latvia (5); Norway (6); Germany (7); Slovakia (8)	Estonia (9); Denmark (10); Canada (11); Poland (12)	Australia (13); Thailand (14); Singapore (15); Philippines (16)

== Tournament groups ==
After the group ballot, 16 teams were divided into 4 groups. In the group stage each team has played each other once, while the second stage of the event included play-offs and placement matches.

The two best teams of group A and B went directly to quarter-final. Teams placed 3rd and 4th in group A and B and the teams placed 1st and 2nd in group C and D made it to the first playoff round (played before the quarter-finals).

== Preliminary round ==
=== Group A ===
Pos	Team	Pld	W	D	L	GF	GA	GD	Pts	Qualification
1	Switzerland (H)	3	2	1	0	20	12	+8	5	Quarterfinals
2	Finland	3	2	0	1	20	10	+10	4	Quarterfinals
3	Slovakia	3	1	0	2	11	23	−12	2	play-off round
4	Norway	3	0	1	2	12	18	−6	1	play-off round

Source: IFF
(H) Hosts

5 November 2022; 15:00	Finland	8–1 (5–1, 0–0, 3–0)	Slovakia	AXA Arena; Attendance: 1343

Game reference
Eemeli Salin 02:03; Nico Salo 10:59; Eetu Sikkinen 12:28, 44:39; Miko Kailiala 14:33; Justus Kainulainen 19:40; Sami Johansson 40:20; Oskari Heikkila 59:34 / Goals / 09:10 Lukas Ujhelyi

5 November 2022; 17:00	Switzerland	4–4 (2–0, 1–3, 1–1)	Norway	Swiss Life Arena; Attendance: 8742

Game reference
Michael Schiess 15:06; Claudio Laely 16:46, 51:58; Manuel Maurer 31:37 / Goals / 28:29 Joachim Terjesen; 38:47 Ketil Kronberg

6 November 2022; 14:00	Finland	5–7 (2–3, 1–2, 2–2)	Switzerland	Swiss Life Arena; Attendance: 10,359

Game reference
Mikko Leikkanen 14:31; Ville Lastikka 16:57; No Player 31:01; Sami Johansson 53:43; Justus Kainulainen 55:33 / Goals / 02:32 Tobias Heller; 08:57, 49:53 Manuel Maurer; 10:55 Partrick Mendelin; 23:12 Noel Seiler; 33:41 Jan Zaugg; 53:37 Michael Schiess

6 November 2022; 17:00	Slovakia	7–6 (2–3, 4–0, 1–3)	Norway	Swiss Life Arena; Attendance: 6672

Game reference
Ladislav Gal 15:15, 30:55; Ronald Gasparik 19:55; Michal Dudovic 22:42, 33:59, 53:06; Lukas Ujhelyi 39:51 / Goals / 04:19 Fredrik Frafjord; 08:00 Joachim Terjesen; 12:50, 59:41 Markus Lindgjerdet; 51:51 Daniel Gidske; 57:39 Patrick Hjemgard

8 November 2022; 18:00	Norway	2–7 (1–0, 1–5, 0–2)	Finland	Swiss Life Arena; Attendance: 753

Game reference
Marius Pedersen 13:37; Patrick Hjemgard 27:33 / Goals / 22:18, 26:48 Justus Kainulainen; 26:35 Oskari Heikkila; 28:30 Eetu Sikkinen; 38:56, 52:46 Sami Johansson; 59:47 Joona Rantala

8 November 2022; 20:00	Slovakia	3–9 (2–4, 0–2, 1–3)	Switzerland	AXA Arena; Attendance: 2000

Game reference
Michal Pazak 16:53; Peter Nehila 19:32; Michal Dudovic 43:02 / Goals / 04:38 Tim Braillard; 06:59 Jan Zaugg; 07:37 Tobias Heller; 13:30 Michael Schiess; 28:53, 30:22 Claudio Laely; 46:53 Patrick Mendelin; 57:13 Jan Burki; 57:21 Joel Ruegger

=== Group B ===
Pos	Team	Pld	W	D	L	GF	GA	GD	Pts	Qualification
1	Sweden	3	2	1	0	33	9	+24	5	Quarterfinals
2	Czech Republic	3	2	1	0	17	12	+5	5	Quarterfinals
3	Germany	3	1	0	2	16	31	−15	2	play-off round
4	Latvia	3	0	0	3	9	23	−14	0	play-off round

Source: IFF

5 November 2022; 12:00	Germany	4–19 (0–5, 3–6, 1–8)	Sweden	AXA Arena; Attendance: 1189

Game reference
Julian Nihlen 20:46; Michel Wocke 26:54, 31:09, 47:05 / Goals / 03:16, 22:26, 59:59 Albin Sjögren; 07:35 Tobias Gustafsson; 16:16, 18:00, 41:11 Alexander Galante Carlström; 16:56 Linus Nordgren; 25:25, 34:39, 37:51 Kim Nilssson; 36:46 Jesper Sankell; 37:17, 55:58 Kevin Haglund; 43:57 Rasmus Enström; 48:27 Casper Backby; 53:13 Malte Lundmark; 59:46 Linus Malmström

5 November 2022; 13:30	Czech Republic	6–3 (3–0, 1–2, 2–1)	Latvia	Swiss Life Arena; Attendance: 6975

Game reference
Marek Benes 00:53, 36:54; Matej Havlas 11:39, 16:56; Josef Rypar 41:33; Mikulas Krbec 58:12 / Goals / 29:08 Klavs Jansons; 34:41 Peteris Trekse

6 November 2022; 12:00	Sweden	11–2 (3–0, 5–1, 3–1)	Latvia	AXA Arena; Attendance: 985

Game reference
Malte Lundmark 07:11, 33:07; Kevin Haglund 18:15, 29:51; Jesper Sankell 18:35, 39:00; Tobias Gustafsson 23:45; Alexander Galante Carlström 38:47; Albin Sjögren 46:15; Kim Nillsson 49:30 / Goals / 35:22 Andris Rajeckis; 41:02 Janis Ragovskis

6 November 2022; 15:00	Germany	6–8 (0–2, 1–6, 5–0)	Czech Republic	AXA Arena; Attendance: 1158

Game reference
Julian Nihlen 31:19, 59:28; Jakob Heins 45:12, 49:11; Svenson Hope 54:05; Michel Wocke 55:33 / Goals / 02:54 Martin Kisugite; 12:43, 32:30 Josef Rypar; 20:57 Adam Delong; 27:06 Jiri Besta; 31:04 Mikulas Krbec; 32:03 Jonas Kreysa; 38:54 Filip Langer

7 November 2022; 19:00	Latvia	4–6 (1–2, 1–2, 2–2)	Germany	Swiss Life Arena; Attendance: 503

Game reference
Artis Raitmus 13:05; Kalvs Jansons 25:50; Peteris Treske 45:46; Arturs Jursevskis 58:30 / Goals / 14:57 Tino Von Pritzuber; 18:50 Svenson Hoope; 22:29 Mark-Oliver Bothe; 23:41, 54:34, 57:29 Michel Wocke

7 November 2022; 18:00	Sweden	3–3 (1–0, 1–2, 1–1)	Czech Republic	AXA Arena; Attendance: 1094

Game reference
Alexander Galante Carlström 14:57, 55:48; Linus Nordgren 25:43 / Goals / 30:13 Martin Tokos; 32:56 Jiri Besta; 47:01 Ondrej Nemecek

=== Group C ===
Pos	Team	Pld	W	D	L	GF	GA	GD	Pts	Qualification
1	Estonia	3	3	0	0	41	13	+28	6	play-off round
2	Canada	3	2	0	1	22	21	+1	4	play-off round
3	Thailand	3	1	0	2	19	32	−13	2	13–16th place playoff
4	Singapore	3	0	0	3	15	31	−16	0	13–16th place playoff

Source: IFF

5 November 2022; 18:00	Singapore	4–12 (0–3, 3–4, 1–5)	Estonia	AXA Arena; Attendance: 645

Game reference
Siraaj Ramadhan 21:56; Juin Jie Ng 31:48; Chee Yong Lee 34:06; Zong Wei Tng 45:35 / Goals / 11:36, 58:04 Patrik Kareliusson; 14:10, 51:07 Mathias Einamann; 19:53, 46:42 Tanel Kasenurm; 20:56 Adam Widercrantz; 29:04 Lauri-Robert Indus; 33:19, 59:20 Stenver Savi; 38:54, 42:00 Ken Pahn

5 November 2022; 20:00	Thailand	4–9 (2–2, 2–4, 0–3)	Canada	Swiss Life Arena; Attendance: 2129

Game reference
Pawat Thaidit 13:29; Simon Johansson 18:07, 22:46; Surapong Sangmongkhol 39:21	Goalies	09:47 Lauri Berg; 13:59, 21:57 Valtteri Viitakoski; 26:49, 35:07, 55:45 Tristan Walsh; 27:42 Brandon Barber; 44:41, 59:28 Cameron Buck

7 November 2022; 10:00	Singapore	7–11 (1–2, 2–6, 4–3)	Thailand	AXA Arena; Attendance: 1659

Game reference
Kumaresa Pasupathy 04:18; Suria R 32:28, 35:56, 58:02; Siraaj Ramadhan 46:01, 49:11; Zong Wei Tng 58:15 / Goals / 05:33, 59:04 Simon Johansson; 09:35, 36:38 Alexander Rinefalk; 10:10, 20:39, 46:31 Pawat Thaidit; 21:48, 35:16 Veerasak Pimpa; 30:05 Liam Kerdsawangwong; 33:03 Santipong Sukkasem; 57:38, 59:52 Surapong Sangmongkhol

7 November 2022; 18:00	Estonia	13–5 (5–2, 3–1, 5–2)	Canada	AXA Arena; Attendance: 1677

Game reference
Mathias Einamann 01:31; Patrik Kareliusson 04:32, 24:25; Oliver Savi 05:45; Tanel Kasenurm 09:27, 12:15; Alexander Dahlberg 26:12; Kermo Uhe 29:59, 56:40; Kaspar Kallion 43:02, 48:15, 53:18; Lauri-Robert Indus 48:54 / Goals / 00:29 Cameron Buck; 00:56, 35:45 Valteri Viitakoski; 40:37 Brandon Barber; 45:31 Cedric Grenapin

8 November 2022; 10:00	Estonia	16–4 (5–2, 5–2, 6–0)	Thailand	Swiss Life Arena; Attendance: 4477

Game reference
Kaspar Kallion 05:22, 12:06; Rasmus Randoja 08:51, 57:58; Tanel Kasenurm 10:25; Patrik Karelissson 18:57, 28:12; Adam Widercrantz 22:42; Patrik Markus 25:16; Roman Pass 36:43; Kermo Uue 31:15, 48:48, 52:08; Alexander Dahlberg 52:51; Oliver Savi 54:55; Rasmus Bolander 59:20 / Goals / 00:38 Simon Johansson; 04:27 Jeerayut Yaemyim; 21:29, 27:14 Santipong Sukkasen

8 November 2022; 13:00	Canada	8–4 (2–0, 3–3, 3–1)	Singapore	Swiss Life Arena; Attendance: 4097

Game reference
Steven Friedli 01:33; Cedric Grenapin 05:11; Brandon Barber 27:47; Valtteri Viitakoski 31:02, 35:58, 55:40; Cameron Buck 44:41; Johanthan Kuysten 55:40 / Goals / 25:06, 34:04 Suria R 36:33 Ye Shen Koh; 37:42 Jia Qing Cheang; 47:06 Wee Guan Nicholas Chua

=== Group D ===
Pos	Team	Pld	W	D	L	GF	GA	GD	Pts	Qualification
1	Denmark	3	3	0	0	26	8	+18	6	play-off round
2	Poland	3	2	0	1	16	11	+5	4	play-off round
3	Australia	3	1	0	2	11	12	−1	2	13–16th place playoff
4	Philippines	3	0	0	3	7	29	−22	0	13–16th place playoff

Source: IFF

6 November 2022; 18:00	Australia	2–6 (2–2, 0–2, 0–2)	Denmark	AXA Arena; Attendance: 721

Game reference
Tomas Gatner 07:57; Ben Kosterich 09:41 / Goals / 08:23 Emil Kajgaard; 13:04 Mathias Glass; 13:04, 41:39 Lukas Eldholm; 31:15 Pontus Henriksen; 51:28 Kasper Kajgaard

6 November 2022; 20:00	Philippines	2–9 (1–2, 0–2, 1–5)	Poland	Swiss Life Arena; Attendance: 722

Game reference
Lucas Werelius 14:01; Melvin Alm Mendoza 50:12 / Goals / 13:22, 50:40 Lucas Dahlström; 18:45 Łukasz Sadolwski; 33:16 Mateusz Antoniak; 37:07, 59:23 Michał Sienko; 42:35 Kapcer Szalanski; 44:12 Łukasz Chlebda; 53:10 Jakub Lyskawa

7 November 2022; 10:00	Denmark	6–3 (2–1, 1–1, 3–1)	Poland	Swiss Life Arena; Attendance: 3211

Game reference
Pontus Henriksen 04:06; Lukas Eldholm 07:27, 43:07; Mathias Glass 27:08; Eddie Sanberg 45:10; Emil Kajgaard 48:13 / Goals / 18:35 Mateusz Antoniak; 33:19 Kacper Skura; 48:46 Jan Rydzewski

7 November 2022; 13:00	Australia	6–2 (0–2, 2–0, 4–0)	Philippines	Swiss Life Arena; Attendance: 2967

Game reference
Christian Newland 21:52, 45:36; Tomas Gatner 29:26; Kade Ebeling 41:31; Jamie Doyle 58:29; Liam Perry 59:14 / Goals / 03:36 Melvin Alm Mendoza; 10:59 Lucas Werelius

8 November 2022; 10:00	Denmark	14–3 (7–2, 2–1, 5–0)	Philippines	AXA Arena; Attendance: 1682

Game reference
Mathias Glass 00:48, 05:27, 12:05, 20:57, 45:55, 53:21; Eddie Sandberg 02:53, 18:51; Daniel Hedegaard 04:59; Frederik Kobberup 13:17; Jannik Dalkvist 21:27; Emil Kajgaard 46:27; Axel Rasmussen 55:38; Mathias Mortensen 59:38 / Goals / 07:42, 17:08 Melvim Alm Mendoza; 35:57 John Alicante Embile

8 November 2022; 13:00	Poland	4–3 (2–0, 0–2, 2–1)	Australia	AXA Arena; Attendance: 1487

Game reference
Lucas Dahlström 09:20, 14:01; Alexander Dahlström 45:10; Łukasz Chlebda 46:23 / Goals / 24:27, 35:41 Daniel Gartner; 51:04 Jamie Doyle

== Knock-out stage ==
Play-off; 9 November
A4	Norway	7
D1	Denmark	6
B3	Germany	21
C2	Canada	3
B4	Latvia	5
C1	Estonia	2
A3	Slovakia	9
D2	Poland	1

Quarterfinals; 10–11 November
B1	Sweden	18
Norway	2
A2	Finland	11
Germany	2
A1	Switzerland	3
Latvia	1
B2	Czech Republic	9
Slovakia	4

Semifinals; 12 November
Sweden	4
Finland	3
Switzerland	3
Czech Republic	11

Final; 13 November
Sweden	9
Czech Republic	3
Third place
Finland	5
Switzerland	3

=== Play-off ===
9 November 2022; 10:00	Norway	7–6 OT (2–4, 2–1, 2–1); OT: 1–0	Denmark	Swiss Life Arena; Attendance: 3,384

Game reference
Marcus Hamrin 05:28; Marius Pedersen 10:48, 60:33; Ole Mossin Olesen 20:53, 33:22; Erlend Vestby Softing 48:04; Patrick Hjemgard 57:38 / Goals / 03:10, 37:01 Mathias Glass; 04:18, 11:56 Lukas Eldholm; 06:56 Eddie Sanberg; 53:23 Pontus Henriksen

9 November 2022; 13:00	Germany	21–3 (5–1, 7–1, 9–1)	Canada	Swiss Life Arena; Attendance: 3,222

Game reference
Jakob Heins 02:53, 40:28, 44:52; Svenson Hope 09:46, 26:28, 30:04; Niklas Broker 11:47, 40:05, 53:37; Tim Bottcher 18:25; Nils Hofferbert 19:58, 51:25; Matthias Siede 28:53; Julian Nilhen 30:47, 39:06, 54:21; Michel Wocke 33:36, 36:56; Florian Weisskirchen 44:12; Janos Broker 50:29; Erik Schuschwary 57:28 / Goals / 03:14 Johanthan Kuysten; 29:13 Valtteri Viitakoski; 48:54 Patrick Mahioney

9 November 2022; 16:00	Slovakia	9–1 (3–0, 4–0, 2–1)	Poland	AXA Arena; Attendance: 325

Game reference
Lukas Ujhelyi 07:47; Matus Gajdos 13:08; Tomas Kvasnica 19:36; Kristian Kozak 23:54; Michal Dudovic 27:12, 55:33; Simon Hatala 32:26; Ronald Gasparik 37:56, 45:26 / Goals / 42:42 Kacper Skura

9 November 2022; 19:00	Latvia	5–2 (1–0, 0–2, 4–0)	Estonia	AXA Arena; Attendance: 372

Game reference
Morics Krumins 10:35; Rolands Kovalevskis 42:14, 46:10; Janis Ragovskis 49:40, 59:16 / Goals / 36:33 Patrik Kareliusson; 38:13 Kaspar Kallion

=== Quarterfinals ===
10 November 2022; 18:00	Switzerland	3–1 (2–0, 0–1, 1–0)	Latvia	Swiss Life Arena; Attendance: 5,495

Game reference
Noel Seiler 05:55; Jan Zaugg 16:23; Manuel Maurer 49:45 / Goals / 21:30 Edgar Purins

10 November 2022; 18:00	Sweden	18–2 (6–1, 6–0, 6–1)	Norway	AXA Arena; Attendance: 612

Game reference
Kevin Haglund 01:40, 15:05; Alexander Galante Carlström 06:52, 22:56, 30:27, 39:46; Johan Samuelsson 14:05; Jesper Sankell 17:40, 31:20; Linus Malmström 25:44, 57:32; Hampus Ahrén 32:07; Kim Nilsson 40:19, 50:52, 56:54; Tobias Gustafsson 43:09; Emil Johansson 49:21 / Goals / 01:56 Patrick Hjemgard; 56:28 Daniel Gidske

11 November 2022; 15:00	Czech Republic	9–4 (3–1, 4–1, 2–2)	Slovakia	Swiss Life Arena; Attendance: 2,759

Game reference
Tom Ondrusek 05:10; Adam Delong 12:19; Matej Havlas 15:51, 27:42; Matyas Sindler 22:11; Filip Langer 25:37; Filip Forman 25:59; Martin Kisugite 52:01; Ondrej Nemecek 53:46 / Goals / 19:24 Michal Dudovic; 24:14, 57:31 Michal Miske; 55:33 Matus Gajdos

11 November 2022; 18:00	Finland	11–2 (6–1, 3–1, 2–0)	Germany	Swiss Life Arena; Attendance: 2,137

Game reference
Justus Kainulainen 01:47, 56:43; Otto Lehkosuo 10:35; Miko Kailiala 11:58; Konsta Tykkylainen 14:26; Janne Lamminen 17:54; Ville Lastikka 18:00; Sami Johansson 23:16, 55.57'; Oskari Heikkila 24:14; Peter Kotilainen 30:20 / Goals / 08:40 Tino Von Pritzbuer; 23:24 Michel Wocke

=== Semifinals ===
12 November 2022; 14:00	Sweden	4–3 SO (0–0, 3–2, 0–1, 0–0); SO: 3–2	Finland	Swiss Life Arena; Attendance: 11,254

Game reference
Linus Nordgren 22:07; Tobias Gustafsson 29:52; Kim Nilsson 31:50 / Goals / 24:30 Justus Kainulainen; 33:11 Nico Salo; 55:15 Otto Lehkosuo

12 November 2022; 17:30	Switzerland	3–11 (2–3, 1–4, 0–4)	Czech Republic	Swiss Life Arena; Attendance: 11,254

Game reference
Christoph Meier 03:00; Patrick Mendelin 06:57, 36:15 / Goals / 01:50 Mikulas Krbec; 13:05, 48:52 Adam Hemerka; 15:36 Ondrej Nemecek; 20:31 Filip Langer; 22:18, 58:38 Jiri Besta; 32:06, 56:33 Filip Forman; 48:52 Martin Tokos; 52:21 Marek Benes

=== Bronze medal game ===
13 November 2022; 12:00	Finland	5–3 (3–0, 1–2, 1–1)	Switzerland	Swiss Life Arena; Attendance: 11,254

Game reference
Justus Kainulainen 05:23; Mikko Leikkanen 14:34; Miko Kailiala 15:40; Nico Salo 20:49; Sami Johansson 59:37 / Goals / 28:53 Jan Burki; 36:43 Patrick Mendelin; 50:15 Jan Zaugg

=== Final ===
13 November 2022; 15:45	Sweden	9–3 (4–1, 2–0, 3–2)	Czech Republic	Swiss Life Arena; Attendance: 11,254

Game reference
Malte Lundmark 07:11, 24:58; Emil Johansson 09:56, 16:52; Jesper Sankell 13:05; Alexander Galante Carlström 35:16, 58:48; Linus Nordgren 41:49; Kevin Haglund 45:33 / Goals / 19:56 Matyas Sindler; 51:49 Matej Havlas; 56:44 Matej Jendrisak

== Placement matches ==
=== 5th place bracket ===
5th–8th place semi-finals
12 November
Latvia	8
Slovakia	5
12 November
Norway	5
Germany	6

5th place
13 November
Latvia	8
Germany	3
7th place
13 November
Slovakia	10
Norway	5

=== 5th–8th place semi-finals ===
12 November 2022; 10:00	Latvia	8–5 (3–3, 2–1, 3–1)	Slovakia	AXA Arena; Attendance: 476

Game reference
Arturs Jursevskis 00:13; Rolands Kovalevskis 08:33; Toms Akmenlauks 14:08; Artis Raitums 20:27, 46:12; Gustavs Griezitis 38:55; Ralfs Orste 55:06; Edgars Purins 57:44 / Goals / 04:03 Samuel Virga; 07:37 Ronald Gasparik; 07:54 Lukas Ujhelyi; 37:04 Michal Dudovic

12 November 2022; 13:00	Norway	5–6 OT (2–1, 0–3, 3–1); OT: 0–1	Germany	AXA Arena; Attendance: 561

Game reference
Erlend Vestby Softing 06:04; Sander Fauskanger 07:19, 43:28; Marius Pedersen 42:07; Ketil Kronberg 48:39 / Goals / 02:37 Jakob Heins; 26:27 Michel Wocke; 27:27 Niklas Broker; 30:12 Svenson Hoppe; 49:08 Nils Hofferbert; 61:34 Janos Broker

=== 5th place match ===
13 November 2022; 9:00	Latvia	8–3 (2–0, 2–2, 4–1)	Germany	Swiss Life Arena; Attendance: 617

Game reference
Peteris Trekse 15:10, 40:42; Daniels Janis Anis 17:58; Edgars Purins 30:31; Andris Rajeckis 39:50; Monics Krumins 52:43, 58:46 / Goals / 24:54 Svenson Hoppe; 25:29 Janos Broker; 54:26 Juilan Nihlen

=== 7th place match ===
13 November 2022; 9:00	Slovakia	10–5 (5–1, 3–2, 2–2)	Norway	AXA Arena; Attendance: 198

Game reference
Ladislav Gal 09:34; Tomas Kvasnica 14:33; Michal Dudovic 17:37, 24:01, 40:44; Ronald Gasparik 18:47, 26:23, 36:22; Matus Gajdos 19:01; Kristan Kozak 44:18 / Goals / 13:03 Ole Mossin Olesen; 28:35, 51:35 Patrick Hjemgard; 30:19 Daniel Gidske; 57:01 Marius Pedersen

=== 9th place bracket ===
9th–12th place semi-finals
10 November
Canada	4
Denmark	8
10 November
Poland	4
Estonia	9

9th place
11 November
Denmark	4
Estonia	5
11th place
11 November
Canada	7
Poland	8

=== 9th–12th place semifinals ===
10 November 2022; 13:00	Canada	4–8 (3–6, 1–0, 0–2)	Denmark	AXA Arena; Attendance: 1,351

Game reference
Valtteri Viitakoski 14:36, 18:40; Taylor Walsh 18:59; Lauri Berg 26:01 / Goals / 03:27 Eddie Sandberg; 07:34, 13:47, 15:36, 17:07 Mathias Glass; 10:24, 44:54 Lukas Eldholm; 53:31 Axel Rasmussen

10 November 2022; 13:00	Poland	4–9 (2–2, 0–5, 2–2)	Estonia	Swiss Life Arena; Attendance: 4,825

Game reference
Kacper Skura 10.29', 49:13; Lucas Dahlstrom 18:22; Mateusz Antoniak 47:25 / Goals / 06:17, 23:30 Patrik Markus; 09:29, 48:40 Patrik Kareliusson; 25:47, 51:39 Tanel Kasenurm; 29:20, 36:31 Alexander Dahlberg; 35:29 Kermo Uue

=== 9th place match ===
11 November 2022; 13:00	Denmark	4–5 (0–0, 0–1, 4–4)	Estonia	AXA Arena; Attendance: 923

Game reference
Lukas Eldholm 47:09, 59:26; Mathias Glass 53:21; Eddie Sanberg 55:31 / Goals / 31:53, 52:03 Tanel Kasenurm; 41:28 Patrik Kareliusson; 54:03, 56:17 Ken Pahn

=== 11th place match ===
11 November 2022; 10:00	Canada	7–8 OT (1–2, 3–3, 3–2); OT: 0–1	Poland	AXA Arena; Attendance: 878

Game reference

=== 13th place bracket ===
13th–16th place semi-finals
10 November
Australia	7
Singapore	4
10 November
Thailand	10
Philippines	6

13th place
11 November
Australia	6
Thailand	5
15th place
11 November
Singapore	5
Philippines	6

=== 13th–16 place semifinals ===
10 November 2022; 10:00	Australia	7–4 (2–1, 2–3, 3–0)	Singapore	Swiss Life Arena; Attendance: 4,578

Game reference
Dylan Clutterbuck 05:22; Daniel Gartner 10:46, 13:44, 48:03; Kade Ebeling 26:51, 39:11; Liam Perry 49:51; Tomas Gartner 59:43 / Goals / 09:10, 35:03 Ryan Michael Karl; 29:33 Kumaresa Pasupathy; 39:47 Yee Shen Koh

10 November 2022; 10:00	Thailand	10–6 (4–0, 3–4, 3–2)	Philippines	AXA Arena; Attendance: 1,523

Game reference
Simon Johansson 03:17, 55:50; Veerasak Pimpa 06:59; Surapong Sangmongkhol 15:06; Prakasit Namsawang 15:50; Jeerayut Yaemyim 22:09, 27:22, 43:57; Aphichet Ratanaprathum 24:17; Pawat Thaidt 59:36 / Goals / 23:58, 35:10, 44:37 Melvin Alm Mendoza; 31:44 Kim Varga Franz; 32.32' Simon Andersson; 41:29 Ludvig Hemmingberg Porral

=== 13th place bracket ===
11 November 2022; 9:00	Australia	6–5 (1–3, 3–0, 2–2)	Thailand	Swiss Life Arena; Attendance: 4,584

Game reference
Jamie Doyle 16:38; Liam Perry 21:55, 30:45, 46:57, 59:58; Daniel Gartner 55:51 / Goals / 07:18 Simon Johansson; 14:51 Jeerayut Yaemyin; 18:11 Chusak Narkpraset; 45:35 Santipong Sukkasem

=== 15th place bracket ===
11 November 2022; 12:00	Singapore	5–6 OT (0–1, 3–1, 2–3); OT: 0–1	Philippines	Swiss Life Arena; Attendance: 4,402

Game reference
Jia Qing Cheang 30:24; Suria R 32:30; Tze Wen Thaddeus Tan 34:24, 52:38; Vignes Pasupathy 51:47 / Goals / 02:53, 30:42, 61:11 Melvin Alm Mendoza; 43:52 Kim Varga Franz; 45:51 Ludvig Hemmingberg Porral; 57:32 Fredik Jeppsson Escabel

== Ranking and statistics ==
=== Final ranking ===
Players of the Czech national team with the silver trophy

The official IFF final ranking of the tournament:

Gold medal	Sweden
Silver medal	Czech Republic
Bronze medal	Finland
4	Switzerland
5	Latvia
6	Germany
7	Slovakia
8	Norway
9	Estonia
10	Denmark
11	Poland
12	Canada
13	Australia
14	Thailand
15	Philippines
16	Singapore

=== All-star team ===
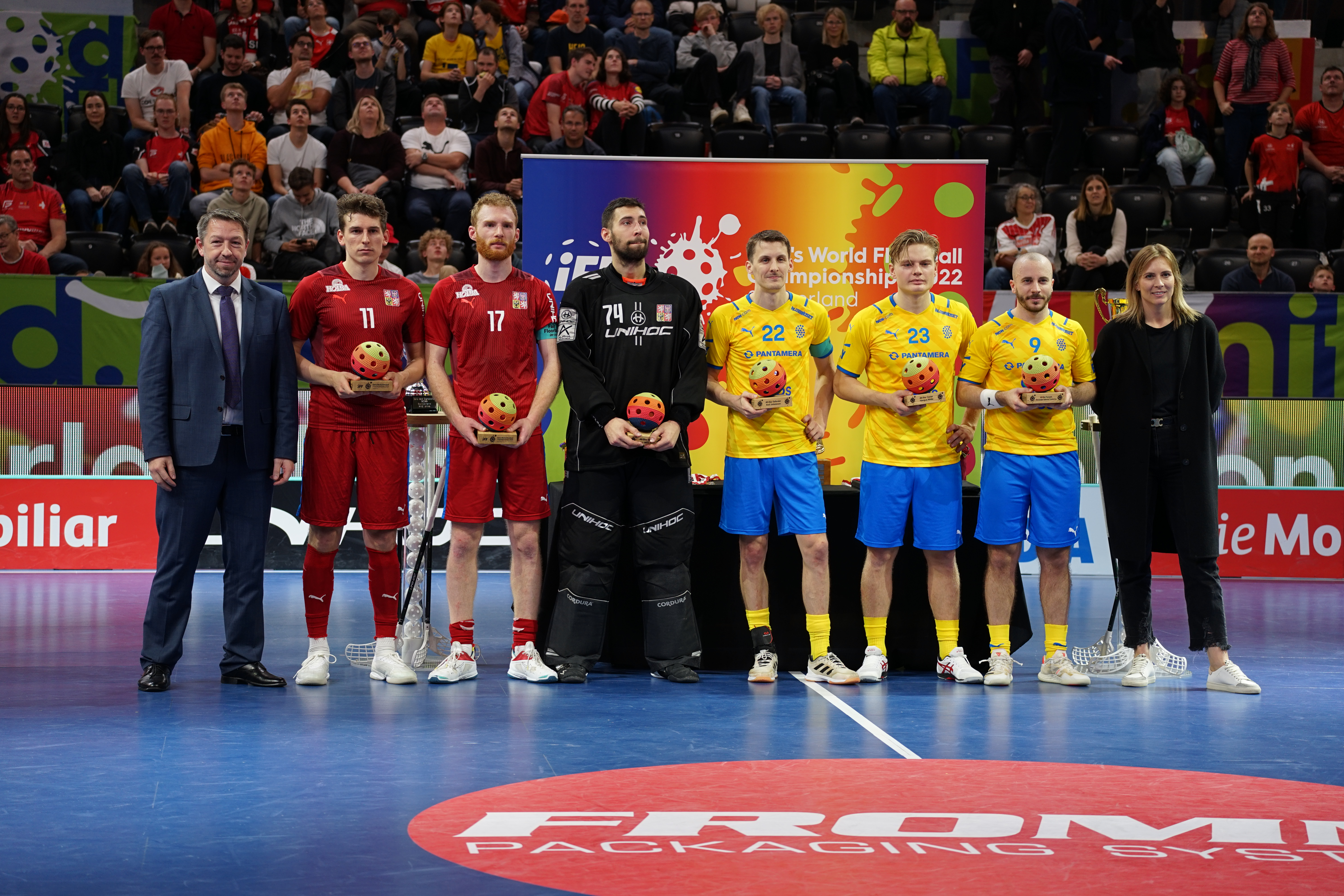

Tournament all-star team:

- Best goalkeeper: (Czech Republic) Lukáš Bauer
- Best defenders: (Czech Republic) Ondřej Němeček, (Sweden) Emil Johansson
- Best forwards: (Czech Republic) Marek Beneš, (Sweden) Hampus Ahrén, (Sweden) Alexander Galante Carlström
- Most valuable player: (Sweden) Alexander Galante Carlström
