= Justus Kainulainen =

Finnish floorball player

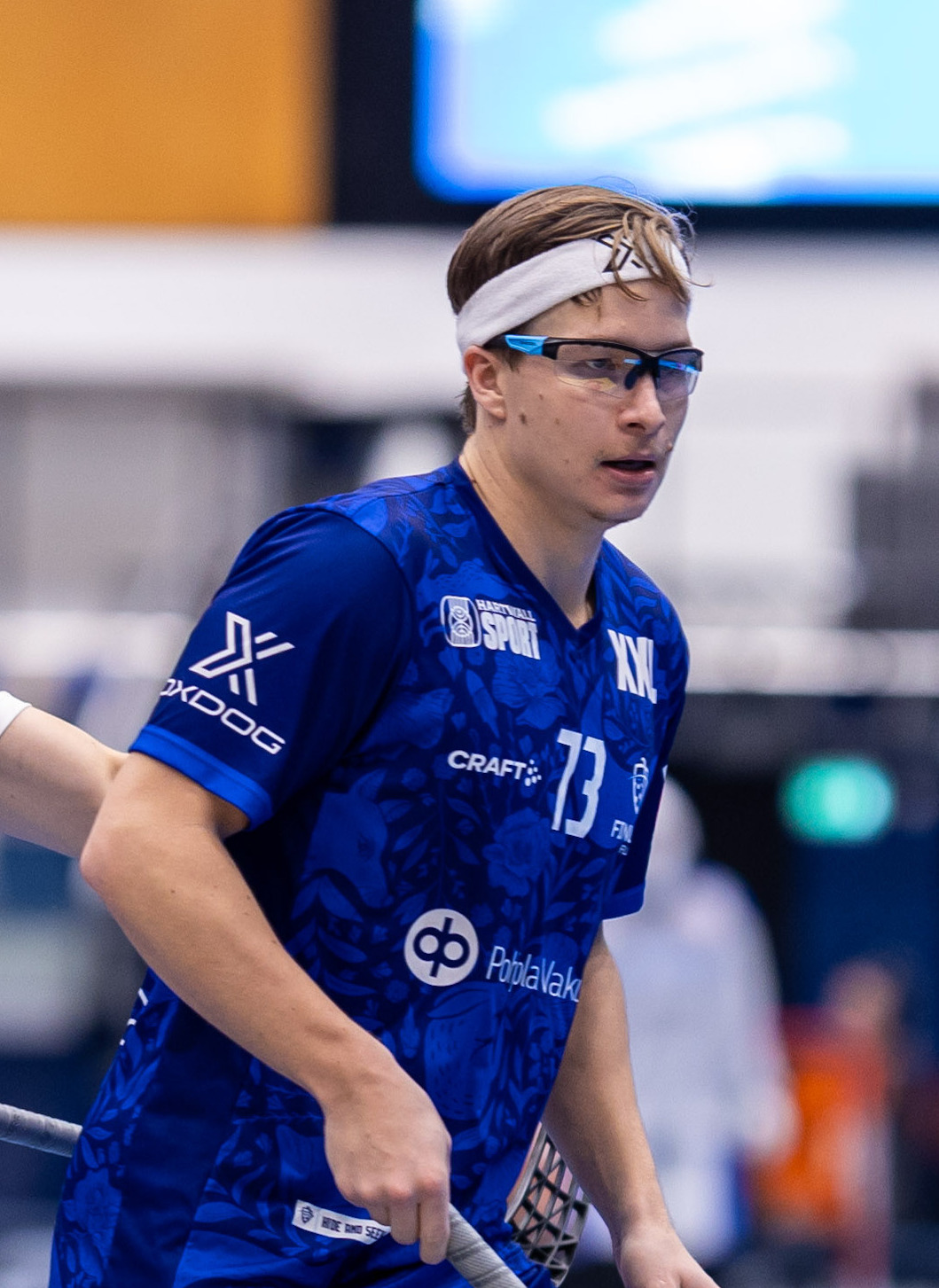
- Kainulainen at the 2024 World Championships

Personal information
- National team: Finland
- Born: 22 February 1999 (age 27) Finland

Sport
- Sport: Floorball
- League: F-liiga (2016–2025); Unihockey Prime League (2025–) (Switzerland)
- Team: LASB (2015–2018); Esport Oilers (2018–2025); Zug United (2025–) (Switzerland)
Medal record
Representing Finland
World Championships
Silver medal – second place	2020 Finland
Bronze medal – third place	2022 Switzerland
Gold medal – first place	2024 Sweden
Under-19 World Championships
Gold medal – first place	2017 Sweden
World Games
Silver medal – second place	2022 Birmingham

Justus Kainulainen (born 22 February 1999) is a Finnish floorball player and national team member. He is a 2024 world champion, two-time Finnish champion, and was named the world's best floorball player in 2024. He has been playing in the Finnish and Swiss top leagues since 2015.

== Club career ==
Kainulainen began his professional floorball career in 2015 with the club LASB, where his older brother Rasmus also played. In his very first season, the team was promoted to the Finnish top league. He played two more seasons in the league with the club before transferring to Oilers in 2018.

His brother followed him to the new team a year later. In the 2020–21 season, they reached the finals with Oilers. In the 2023–24 campaign, Kainulainen was the top scorer of the playoffs and led the team as a captain to their first championship title in 18 years. In the decisive seventh game of the final series, he scored three goals, the last being the game-winner. As a result, he was named the season's most valuable player and the sportsman of the city of Espoo. In the following season, they successfully defended the title, although Kainulainen did not play in the final match due to injury.

Ahead of the 2025/2026 season, he transferred to Zug United, the reigning two-time champions of the Swiss Unihockey Prime League. However, the team fell short of defending their title, finishing in second place.

== International career ==
Kainulainen represented Finland at the 2017 Under-19 World Championships, where he led the Finnish team to a successful title defense as the tournament's top scorer. In the final match, he scored four goals and assisted another.

He made his debut for the men's national team at the postponed home 2020 World Championships held in Finland, where the team failed to defend their title. Kainulainen scored a hat trick in the final and was named to the All-Star Team. He won his first world title at the 2024 championship, where, as the team's top scorer, he helped overturn a 0–4 deficit in the medal match with two goals and an assist.

Year	Team	Event	Result
2017	Finland U-19	WFC U-19	1st place, gold medalist(s)
2020	Finland	WFC	2nd place, silver medalist(s)
2022	Finland	WG	2nd place, silver medalist(s)
2022	Finland	WFC	3rd place, bronze medalist(s)
2024	Finland	WFC	1st place, gold medalist(s)

== Awards ==
In 2024, Kainulainen was named the world's best floorball player in a Innebandymagazinet Award. For the 2024/2025 season, he won the inaugural Player of the Year award presented by the International Floorball Federation.

== Gallery ==
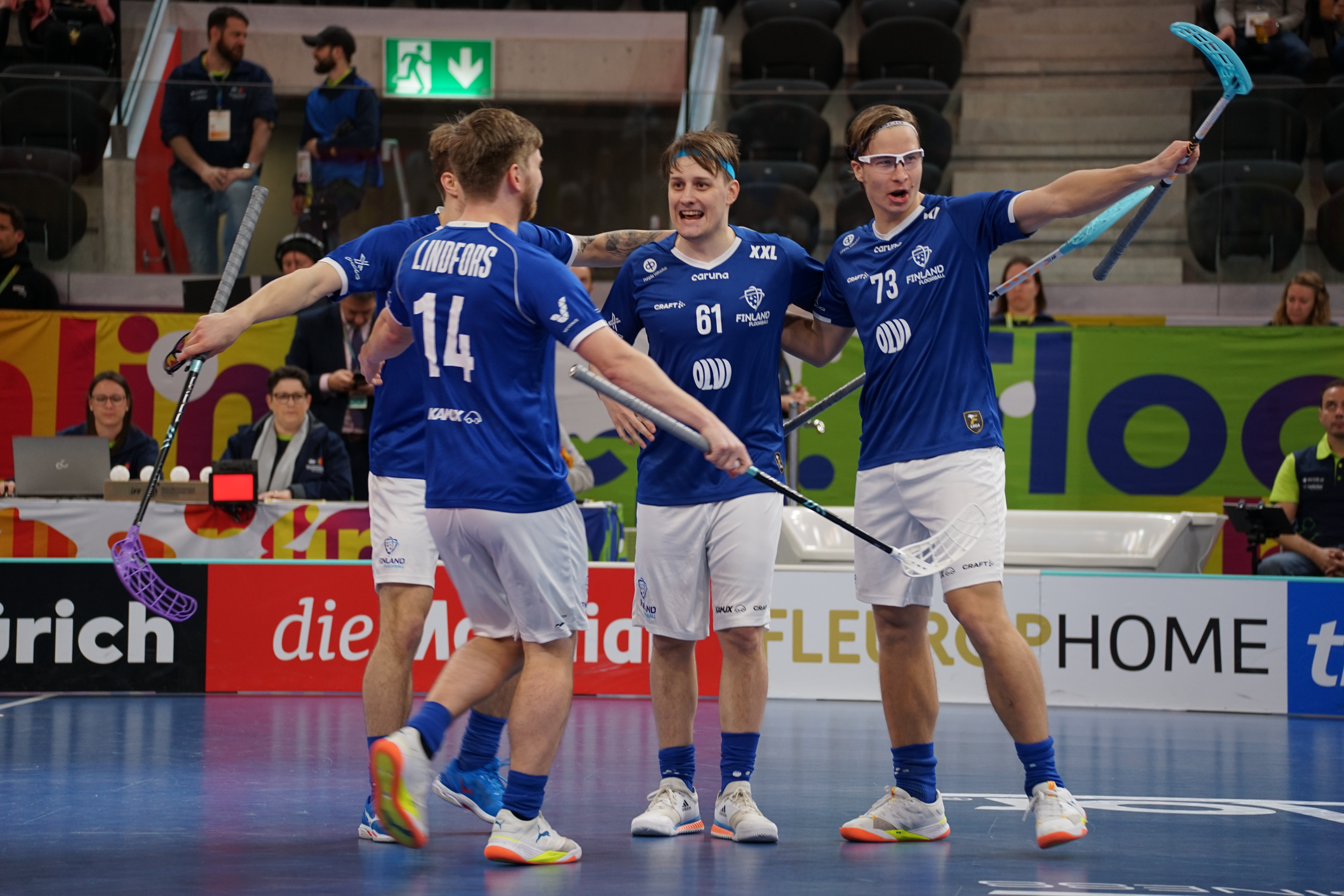
Kainulainen (right) at the 2022 World Championships

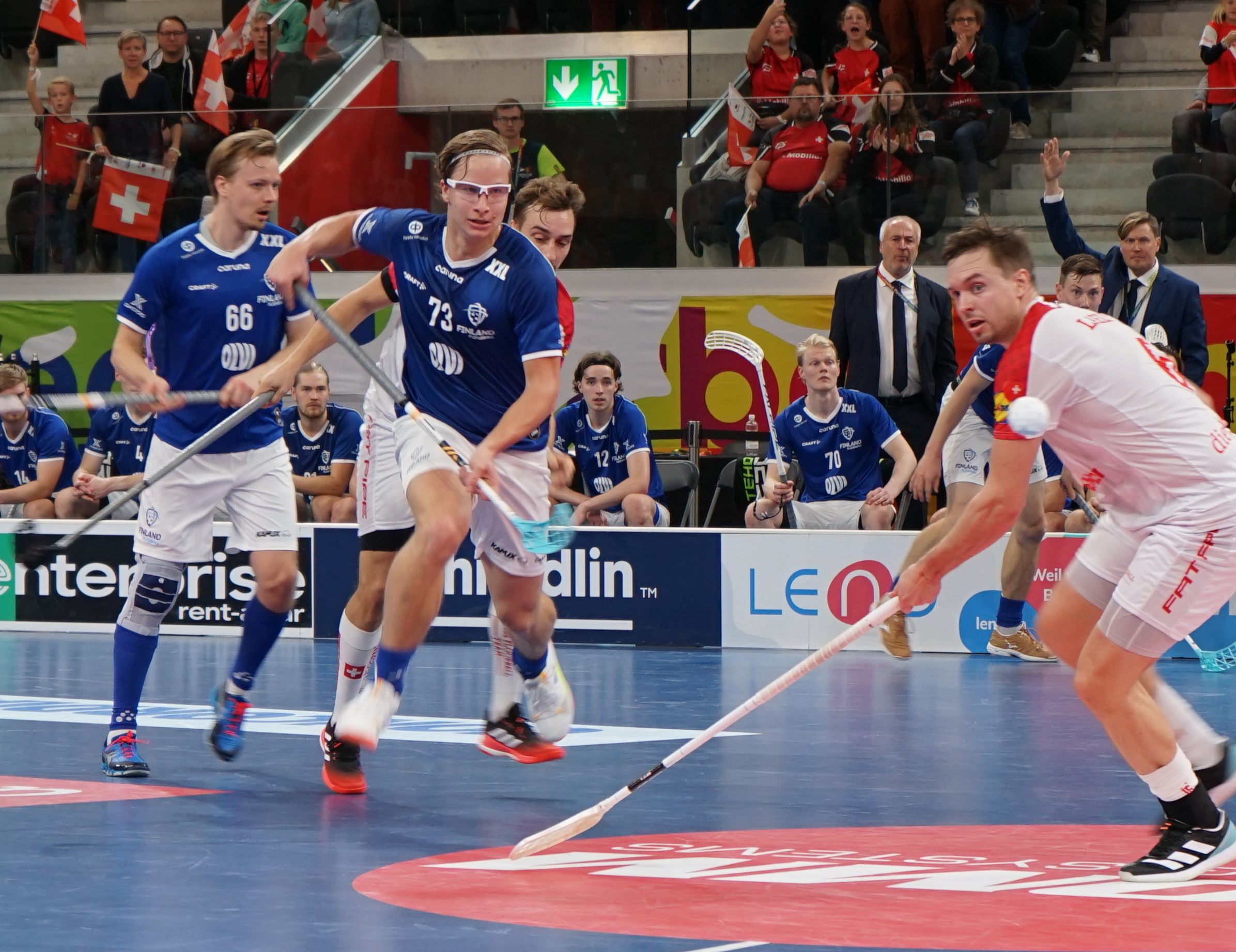
Kainulainen (second from left in blue) at the 2022 World Championships

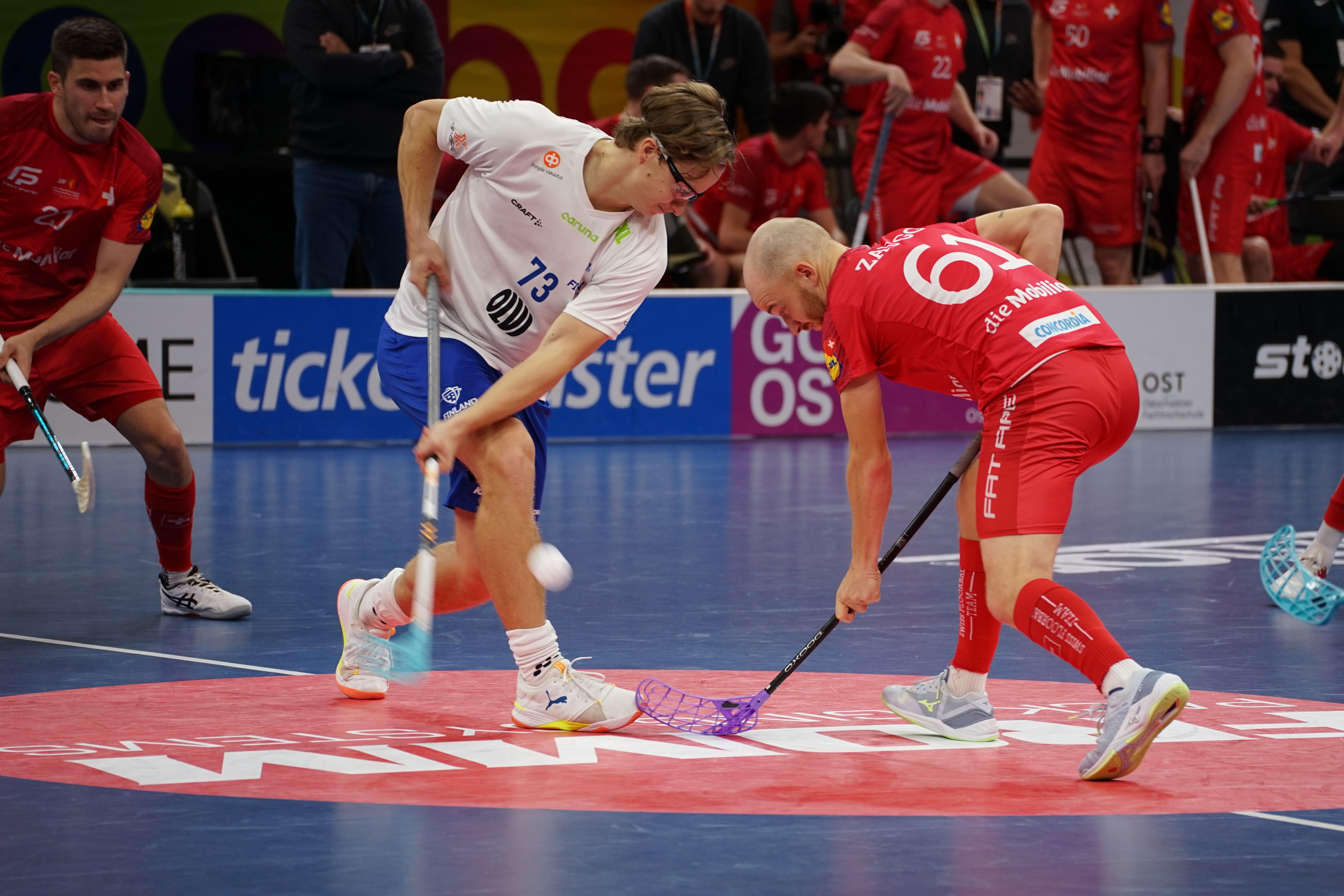
Kainulainen (in white) in the bronze medal match at the 2022 World Championships
