= Alexander Galante Carlström =

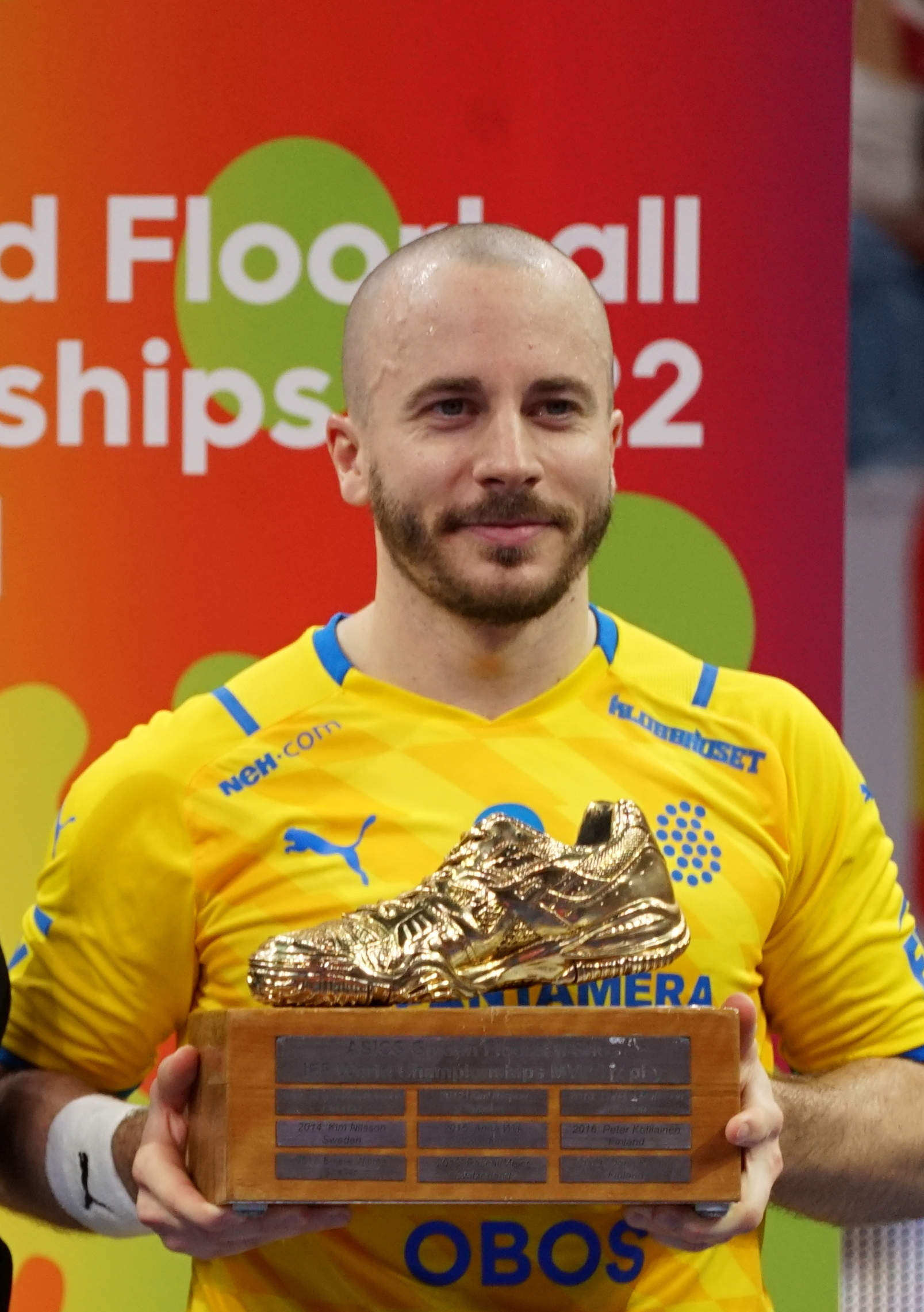
- Galante Carlström after WFC 2022 final.

Personal information
- National team: Sweden
- Born: 30 January 1989 (age 37) Västerås, Sweden

Sport
- Sport: Floorball
- Position: Forward
- League: Swedish Super League (2010–2025); Unihockey Prime League (2025–) (Switzerland)
- Team: Västerås IBF (2006–2010); IBF Falun (2010–2025); SV Wiler-Ersigen (2025–) (Switzerland)
Medal record
Representing Sweden
World Championships
Gold medal – first place	2014 Sweden
Silver medal – second place	2016 Latvia
Silver medal – second place	2018 Czech Republic
Gold medal – first place	2020 Finland
Gold medal – first place	2022 Switzerland
World Games
Gold medal – first place	2017 Wroclaw

Alexander Galante Carlström (born 30 January, 1989) is a Swedish floorball forward and former national team player. He is a three-time world champion, a seven-time winner of the Swedish Super League, and one of the greatest floorball players in history. He has spent most of his professional career, which began in 2006, at IBF Falun. Since 2025–26 season, he will be playing for the Swiss club SV Wiler-Ersigen.

== Club career ==
=== Early career ===
Galante Carlström began his youth career in 1995 with the team Westra Aros. He later played for Västerås IBF, Skälby IBK, and Råby BK.

=== Västerås IBF ===
In 2006, he returned to his hometown of Västerås, where he began his professional career with the local club. In the 2007–08 season, he helped the team earn promotion to the Swedish Super League. During the 2008–09 season, Västerås finished in 11th place, just one point away from relegation. After the following 2009–10 season, in which they finished 12th, the club went bankrupt.

=== IBF Falun ===
Galante then transferred to IBF Falun. In his first season with the club, he reached the semifinals. He won his first Swedish championship title, as well as the club’s first, in the 2012–13 season. They subsequently also triumphed in the Champions Cup. IBF Falun managed to defend both their Swedish Super League and Champions Cup titles twice in a row.

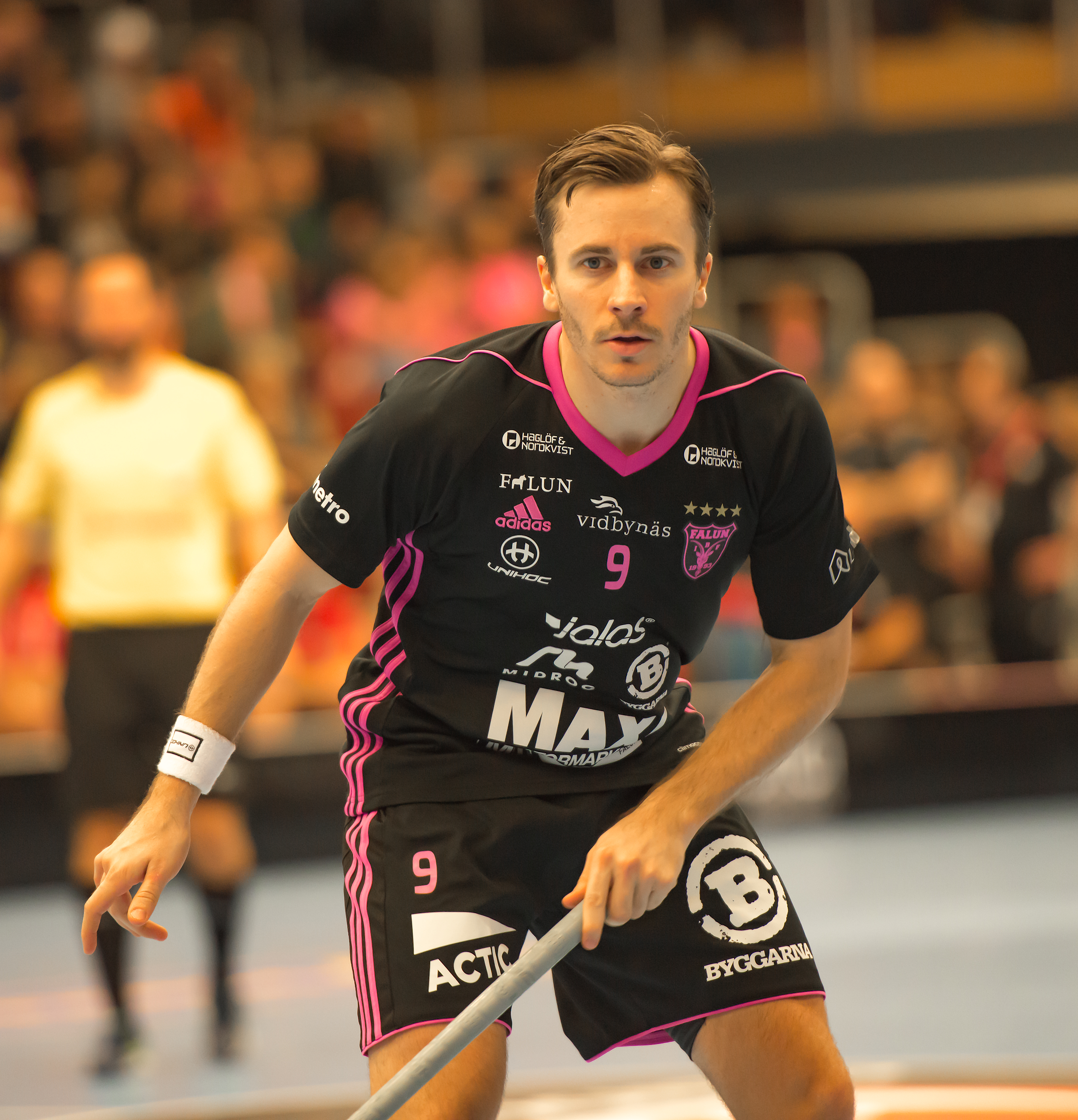
Galante in the IBF Falun jersey during the 2018–19 season

They won their fourth league title in the 2016–17 season and once again triumphed in the subsequent Champions Cup. During this season, Galante also set a scoring record in the Swedish Super League with 68 goals in a single season. In 2016 and 2017, he was named the world's best floorball player twice.

After two seasons finishing as runners-up, IBF Falun won the league title again in three consecutive seasons: 2019–20, 2020–21, and 2021–22. In 2023, Galante secured his first Swedish Cup victory and his fifth Champions Cup title. After the 2024/2025 season, which Falun ended with a loss in the Swedish Super League final, he left the club after 15 years. In his last nine seasons with IBF Falun, he was the league’s top scorer. Shortly before leaving the Swedish league, he surpassed the milestone of 700 goals in the regular season. At that time, the second-highest scorer had fewer than 400 goals.

=== SV Wiler-Ersigen ===
In December 2024, he was announced as a new signing for SV Wiler-Ersigen, with whom he has been playing in the Swiss Unihockey Prime League since the 2025–26 season.

== International career ==
Galante Carlström represented the Swedish national team from 2011. Between 2014 and 2022, he participated in five World Championships, winning three gold medals and earning silver in the other two. He had hoped to end his career at the home World Championship in 2024, but the coaches did not select him due to performance reasons.

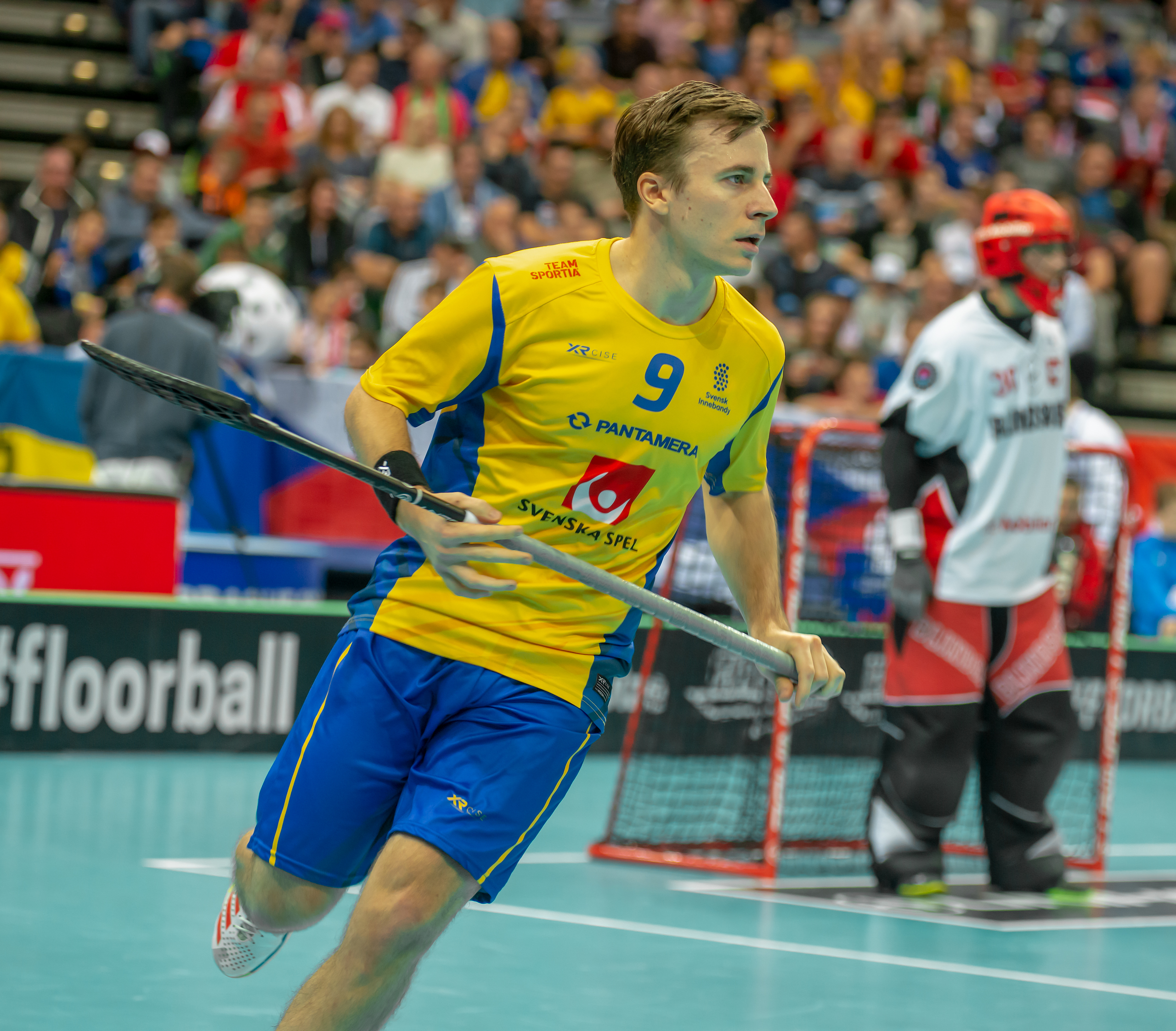
Galante at the 2018 World Championship

In 105 matches for the Swedish national team, he recorded 190 points.

Year	Team	Event	Result
2014	Sweden	WFC	1st place, gold medalist(s)
2016	Sweden	WFC	2nd place, silver medalist(s)
2017	Sweden	WG	1st place, gold medalist(s)
2018	Sweden	WFC	2nd place, silver medalist(s)
2020	Sweden	WFC	1st place, gold medalist(s)
2022	Sweden	WFC	1st place, gold medalist(s)

== Awards and records ==
=== Awards ===
- In 2016 and 2017, he was named the world's best floorball player in Innebandymagazinet Award.
- In 2016 and 2022, he was included in to the World Championship All-Star Team.
- In 2022, he was also named the best player of the tournament.

=== Records ===
- Most total goals scored in regular seasons of the Swedish Super League (over 700).
- Most goals scored in a single season of the Swedish Super League (68, 2016–17).
- Most goals scored in a single match of the Swedish Super League (10, 2021–22)
- Most points in a single match of the Swedish Super League (12, 2021–22)
