= Anton Johansson (ice hockey) =

Swedish ice hockey player (born 2004)

- Born: 10 June 2004 (age 22) Stockholm, Sweden
- Height: 6 ft 4 in (193 cm)
- Weight: 187 lb (85 kg; 13 st 5 lb)
- Position: Defence
- Shoots: Right
- NHL team Former teams: Detroit Red Wings; Leksands IF
- NHL draft: 105th overall, 2022; Detroit Red Wings
- Playing career: 2022–present

Anton Johansson (born 10 June 2004) is a Swedish ice hockey defenceman for the Detroit Red Wings of the National Hockey League (NHL). Johansson was drafted 105th overall by the Red Wings in the 2022 NHL entry draft.

== Playing career ==
Johansson made his professional debut for Leksands IF during the 2021–22 season, where he was scoreless in four games. He also appeared in 22 games for Leksands' J20 team where he recorded six goals and four assists, and appeared in 27 games for the J18 team where he recorded seven goals and 15 assists.

Johansson was drafted in the fourth round, 105th overall, by the Detroit Red Wings in the 2022 NHL entry draft.

On 25 January 2023, Johansson signed a rookie contract with Leksands IF for the remainder of the 2022–23 season, after reaching 100 minutes of playing time in the SHL. He finished the season with one goal in 21 games. On 2 May 2023, he signed a two-year contract extension with Leksands IF through the 2024–25 season.

On 13 March 2025, Johansson signed a three-year, entry-level contract with the Red Wings. He will report to the Red Wings' AHL affiliate, the Grand Rapids Griffins, on an amateur tryout (ATO) for the remainder of the 2024–25 season.

== International play ==
Medal record

Representing Sweden

Ice hockey

World Junior Championships
Silver medal – second place	2024 Sweden	

Johansson represented Sweden at the 2024 World Junior Ice Hockey Championships and won a silver medal.

== Personal life ==
Johansson in the son of manager and retired ice hockey player Thomas Johansson, and younger brother of ice hockey player Simon Johansson.

== Career statistics ==
=== Regular season and playoffs ===
			Regular season					Playoffs
Season	Team	League	GP	G	A	Pts	PIM	GP	G	A	Pts	PIM
2020–21	Leksands IF	J18	13	3	3	6	16	—	—	—	—	—
2021–22	Leksands IF	J18	27	7	15	22	62	6	1	5	6	4
2021–22	Leksands IF	J20	22	6	4	10	12	2	0	0	0	4
2021–22	Leksands IF	SHL	4	0	0	0	0	2	0	0	0	0
2022–23	Leksands IF	J20	32	6	7	13	94	—	—	—	—	—
2022–23	Leksands IF	SHL	21	1	0	1	2	3	0	0	0	2
2023–24	Leksands IF	J20	1	0	0	0	0	—	—	—	—	—
2023–24	Leksands IF	SHL	46	3	5	8	16	7	2	2	4	2
2024–25	Leksands IF	SHL	46	5	5	10	50	—	—	—	—	—
2024–25	Grand Rapids Griffins	AHL	11	0	5	5	12	3	0	1	1	0
2025–26	Leksands IF	SHL	42	5	12	17	49	—	—	—	—	—
2025–26	Grand Rapids Griffins	AHL	8	2	4	6	2	8	0	1	1	8
SHL totals			159	14	22	36	117	12	2	2	4	4

=== International ===
Year	Team	Event	Result	GP	G	A	Pts	PIM
2024	Sweden	WJC	2nd place, silver medalist(s)	7	0	0	0	14
Junior totals				7	0	0	0	14
