= Winterthur Central Sports Hall =

Sports venue in the canton of Zürich, Switzerland

- Hallensport-Zentrum Winterthur
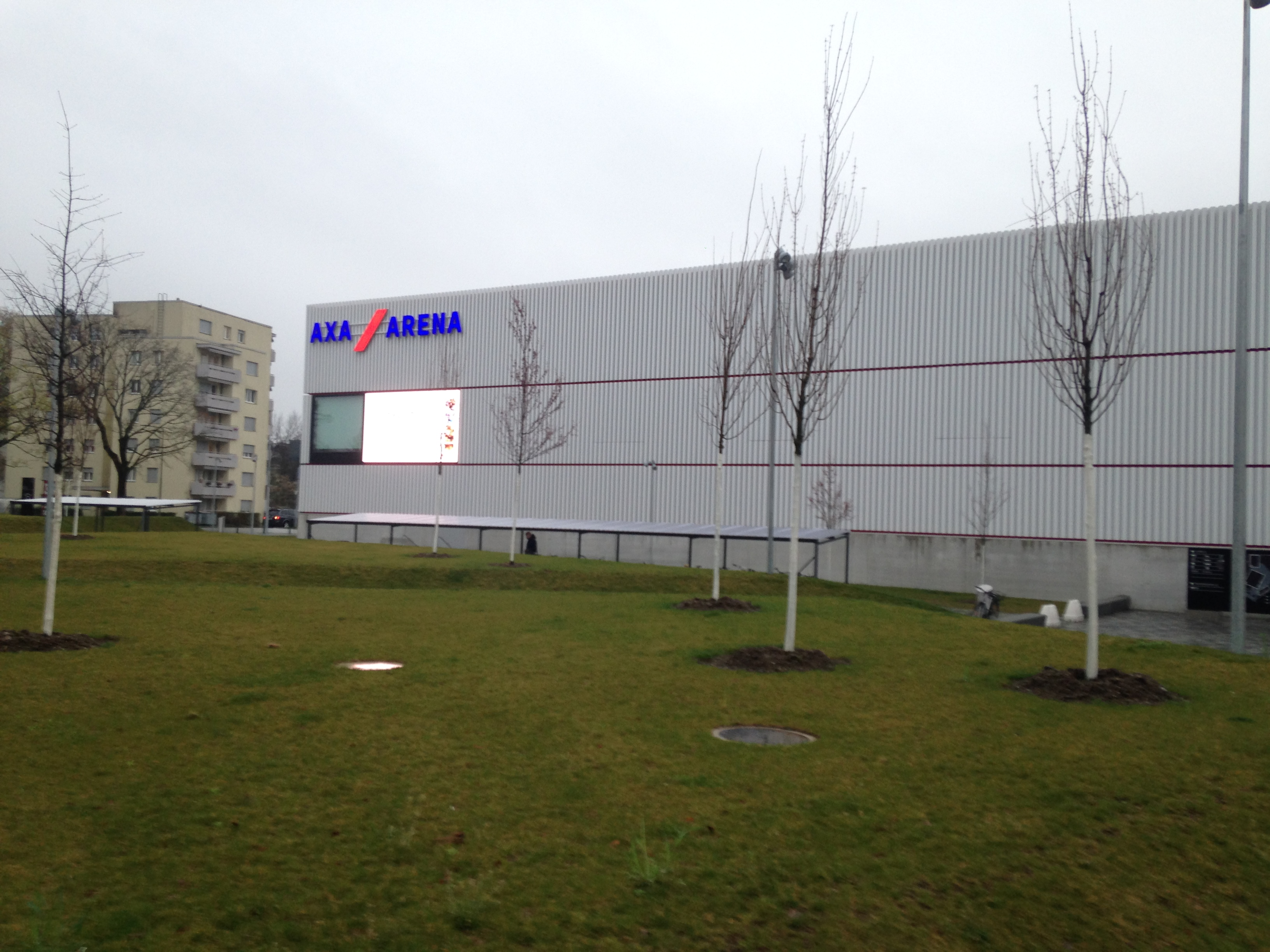
- Inside the venue
- Interactive map of Winterthur Central Sports Hall
- Full name: AXA-Arena
- Former names: Win4 Arena
- Address: Grüzefeldstrasse 36, 8400 Winterthur
- Location: Winterthur, Switzerland
- Owner: WIN4 Management AG
- Operator: WIN4 Management AG
- Capacity: 2000
- Executive suites: Lounge (300 seats); Press gallery Press room
- Scoreboard: 2x LED Screens
- Field size: 20 × 40 m
- Acreage: 29 × 48 m
- Public transit: Scheidegg (Winterthur bus line no.3)

Construction
- Groundbreaking: August 2016
- Opened: 17 August 2018
- Cost: 36 000 000CHF
- Architect: EM2N Architekten AG

Tenants
- HC Rychenberg Winterthur (Floorball); Pfadi Winterthur (Handball)

Winterthur Central Sports Hall (German: Hallensport-Zentrum Winterthur), known AXA-Arena for sponsorship reasons, is an indoor sports arena, home to handball club Pfadi Winterthur and floorball club HC Rychenberg Winterthur. It can also be adopted to host basketball.
