= Thomas Johansson (ice hockey) =

Swedish ice hockey player (born 1970)

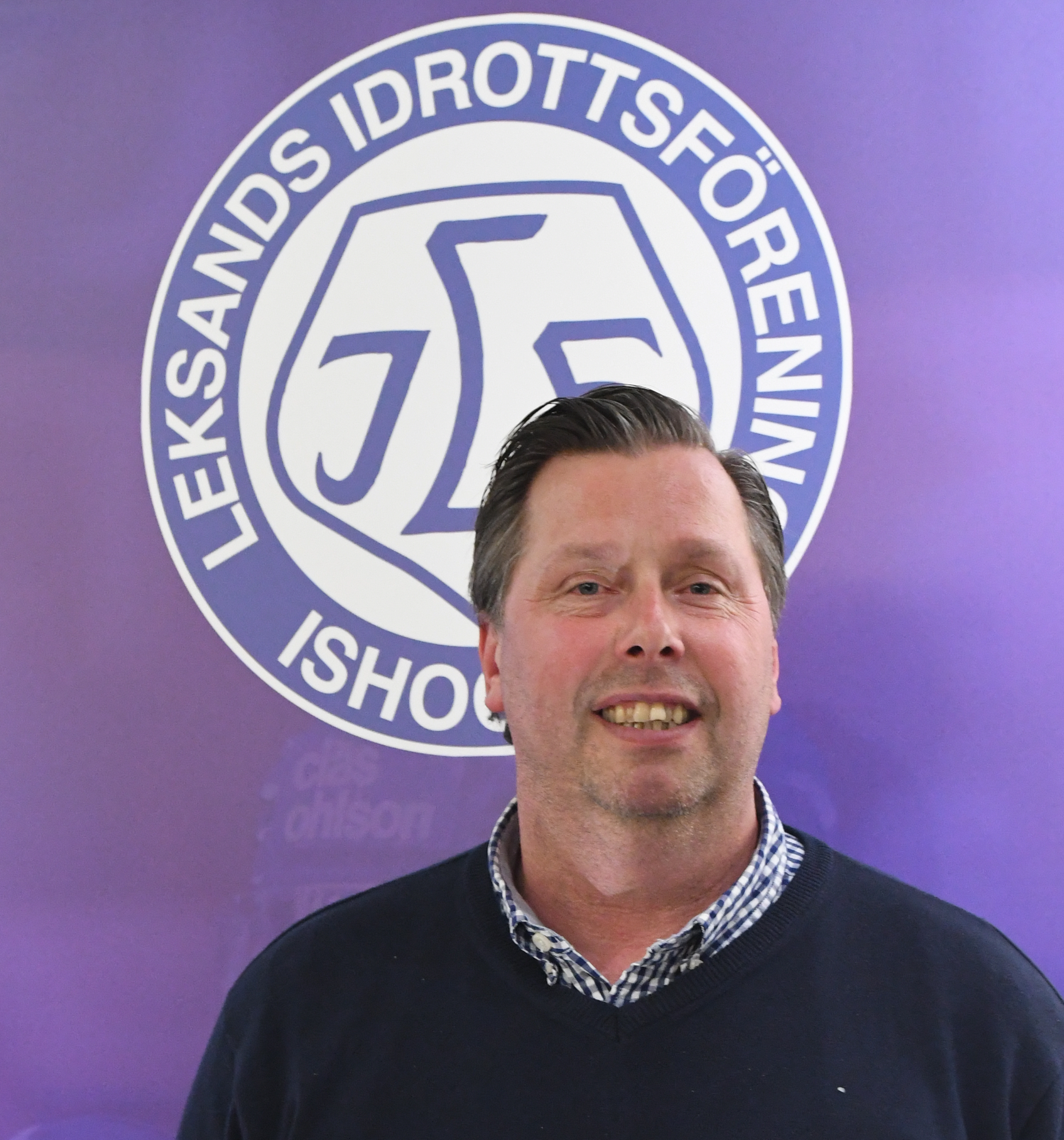
- Born: 18 August 1970 (age 55) Stockholm, Sweden
- Height: 185 cm (6 ft 1 in)
- Weight: 92 kg (203 lb; 14 st 7 lb)
- Position: Defense
- Shot: Left
- Played for: Nacka; Djurgården; Danderyd/Täby; Jokerit; AIK; Linköping; Mjölby HC
- National team: Sweden
- Playing career: 1989–2009

Thomas Johansson (born 18 August 1970) is a retired Swedish ice hockey player. Johansson was part of the Djurgården Swedish champions' team of 2000. Johansson made 439 Elitserien appearances for Djurgården.

== Personal life ==
Johansson's sons Simon and Anton are both professional ice hockey players. Anton was drafted in the fourth round, 105th overall, by the Detroit Red Wings in the 2022 NHL entry draft.
