= Simon Johansson =

Swedish ice hockey player

- Born: 14 June 1999 (age 27) Stockholm, Sweden
- Height: 6 ft 2 in (188 cm)
- Weight: 185 lb (84 kg; 13 st 3 lb)
- Position: Defence
- Shoots: Right
- Liiga team Former teams: Ilves; Djurgårdens IF
- NHL draft: 148th overall, 2018; Minnesota Wild
- Playing career: 2018–present

Simon Johansson (born 14 June 1999) is a Swedish professional ice hockey defenceman who currently plays for Ilves in the Finnish Liiga. He was selected in the fifth round, 148th overall, by the Minnesota Wild in the 2018 NHL entry draft.

== Playing career ==
Johansson made his SHL debut playing for Djurgårdens IF during the 2017–18 season, playing eight games and scoring one goal. Following four professional seasons within Djurgårdens IF, Johansson left Swedish and signed with Finnish Liiga side Ilves for the 2021–22 Liiga season.

Johansson enjoyed a breakout season with Ilves, recording 32 points in 58 games from the blueline resulting in becoming the youngest defensemen in Ilves history to score 32 points in a season.

On 28 April 2022, Johansson was signed by his NHL draft club, the Minnesota Wild, agreeing to a two-year, entry-level contract to begin in the 2022–23 season.

On September 17, 2024, Johansson signed a two-year contract to return to play for Ilves in the Finnish Liiga.

== Personal life ==
Johansson in the son of manager and retired ice hockey player Thomas Johansson and brother of professional ice hockey player Anton Johansson.

== Career statistics ==
			Regular season					Playoffs
Season	Team	League	GP	G	A	Pts	PIM	GP	G	A	Pts	PIM
2016–17	Djurgårdens IF	J20	41	7	14	21	18	2	0	0	0	0
2017–18	Djurgårdens IF	J20	43	16	20	36	20	3	1	1	2	2
2017–18	Djurgårdens IF	SHL	8	1	0	1	0	—	—	—	—	—
2018–19	Almtuna IS	Allsv	43	3	8	11	28	—	—	—	—	—
2019–20	Djurgårdens IF	J20	3	1	3	4	2	—	—	—	—	—
2019–20	Djurgårdens IF	SHL	34	1	6	7	18	—	—	—	—	—
2020–21	Djurgårdens IF	SHL	37	1	3	4	8	1	0	0	0	0
2020–21	Mora IK	Allsv	14	1	11	12	6	4	1	1	2	4
2021–22	Ilves	Liiga	58	8	24	32	20	10	1	6	7	4
2022–23	Iowa Wild	AHL	64	2	12	14	26	2	0	0	0	0
2023–24	Iowa Wild	AHL	72	9	12	21	54	—	—	—	—	—
2024–25	Ilves	Liiga	39	9	13	22	12	11	2	4	6	6
SHL totals			79	3	9	12	2	1	0	0	0	0
Liiga totals			97	17	37	54	32	21	3	10	13	10
