= Men's World Floorball Championship =

International floorball competitions for national teams

- Upcoming season or competition: 2026 Men's World Floorball Championships
- Sport: Floorball
- Founded: 1996; 30 years ago
- No. of teams: 16 (finals)
- Continent: International (IFF)
- Most recent champions: Finland (2024, 5th title)
- Most titles: Sweden (10 titles, the last in 2022)
- Related competitions: Women's World Championship; Under-19 World Championships
- Website: floorball.sport

The Men's World Floorball Championship is an international floorball competition contested by the senior men's national teams of the members of the International Floorball Federation (IFF). It is held regularly in even years since 1996. In odd years, the women's championship is played. The tournament takes place in December.

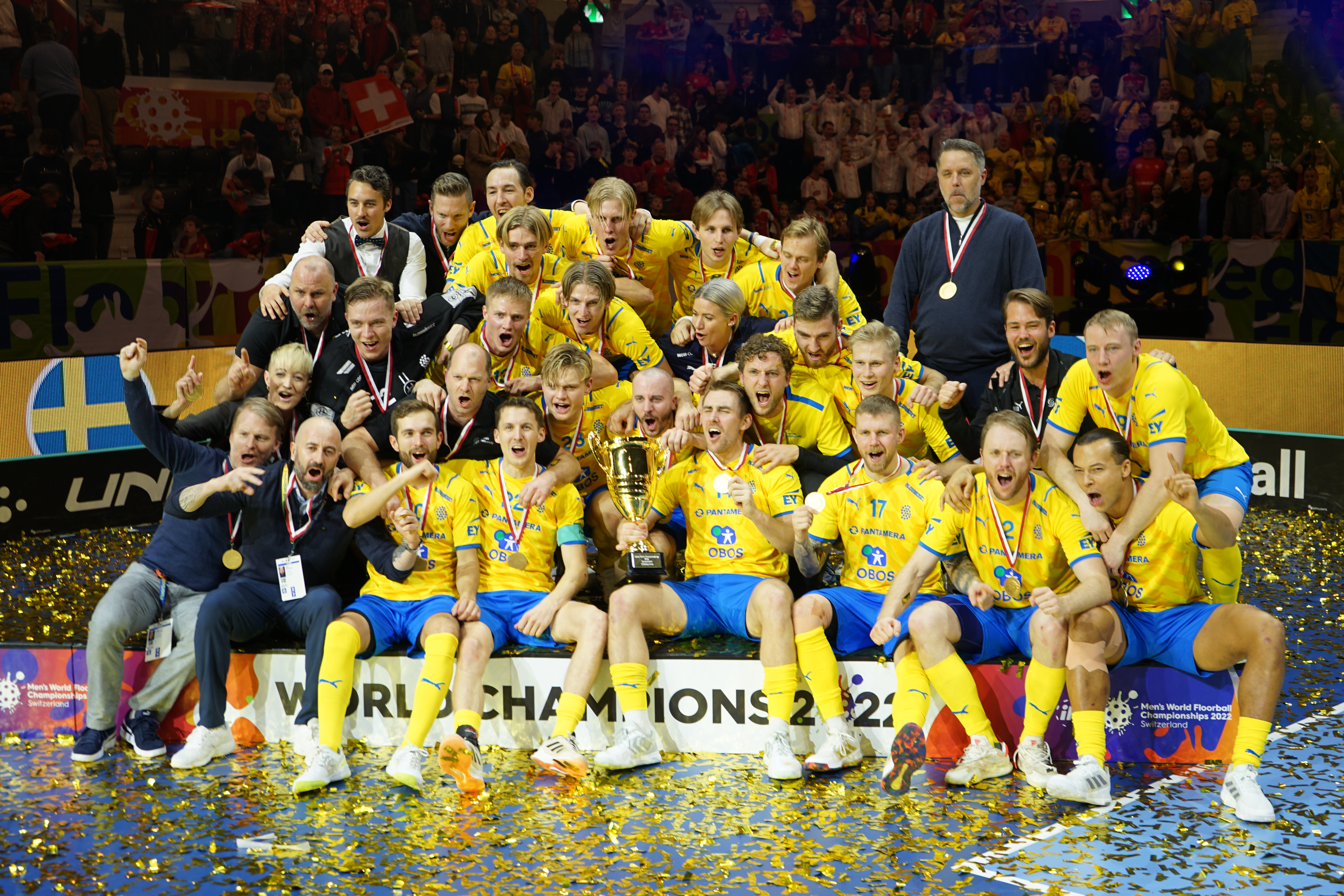
Swedish team celebrating the title in 2022 World Championships

The reigning champions are Finland, who won their fifth title at the 2024 tournament in Sweden. The most successful country is Sweden, with 10 wins, the last in 2022, and participation in every final so far. The other medalists are the Czech Republic with two silvers from 2022 and 2004, Switzerland with one from 1998 and Norway with one bronze from 1996.

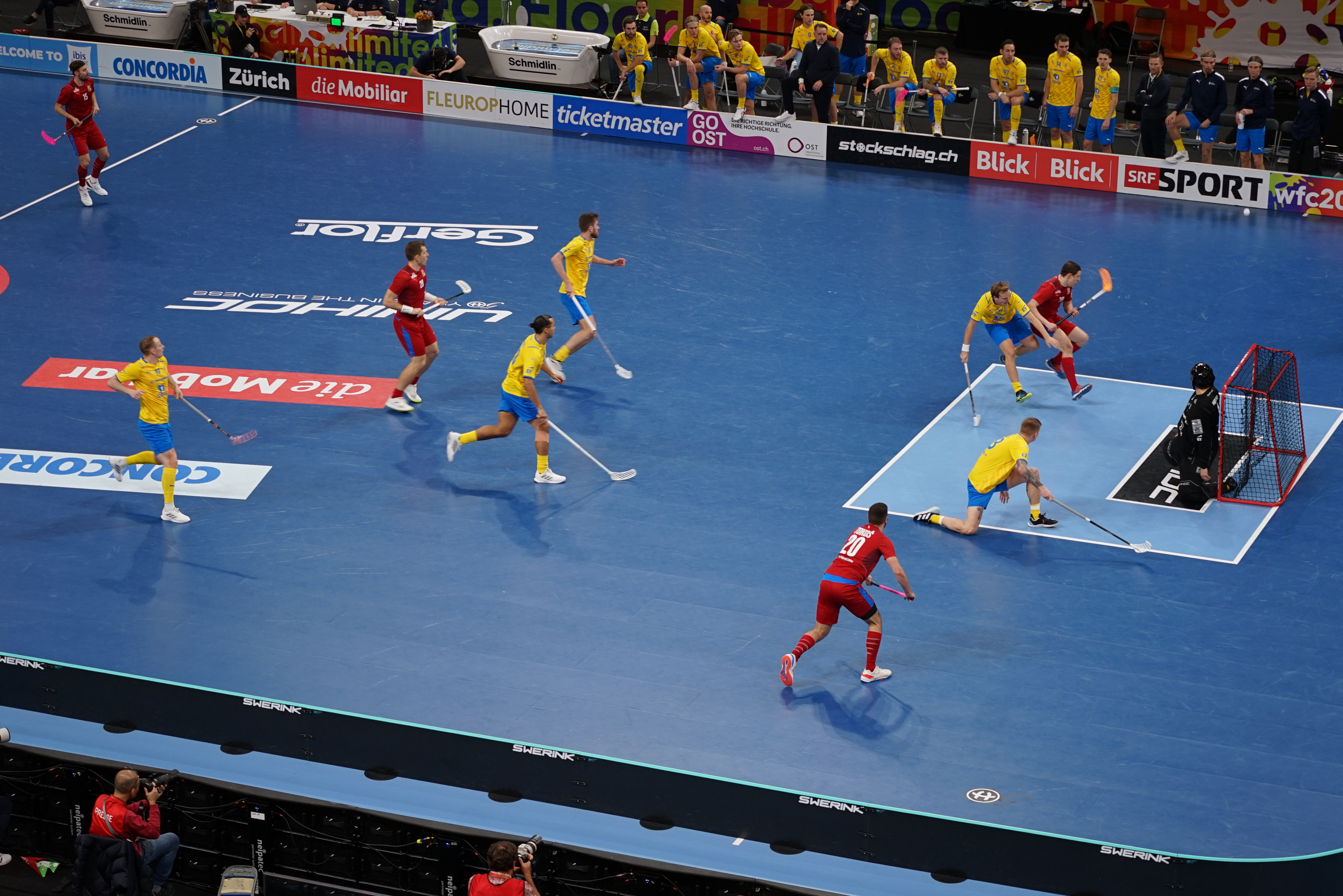
Final match Sweden vs. Czechia at 2022 World Championships

The next championship will take place in Finland in 2026.

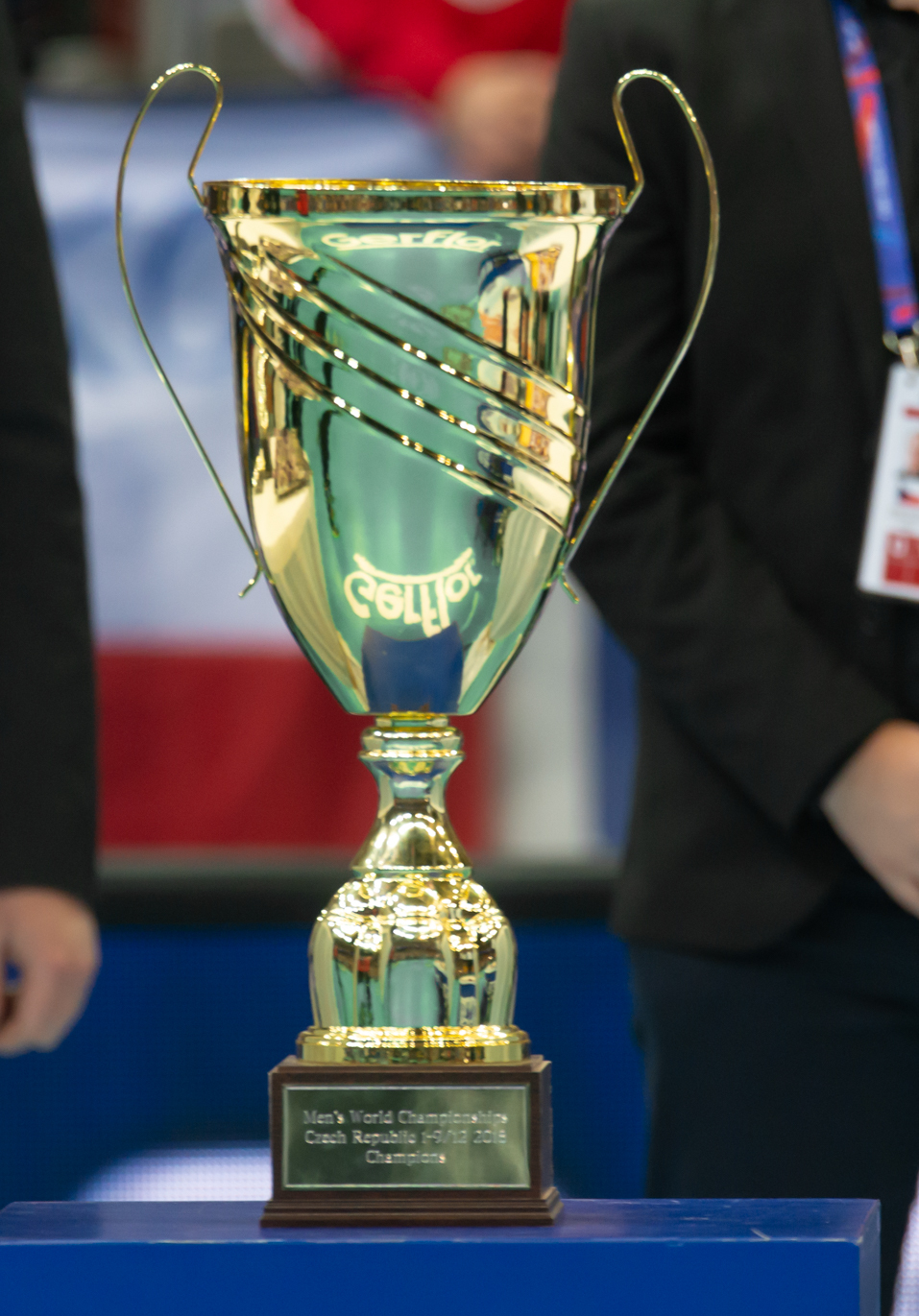
Trophy for the winner of the 2018 World Championship

== Format ==
There are 16 teams participating in the tournament. The host country is automatically guaranteed a spot, while the remaining 15 spots are determined through regional qualifiers. These qualifiers, typically comprising several European tournaments and one each for the Americas and Asia-Oceania, are held about a year before the championship.

The teams are then drawn into four groups (A–D), each consisting of four teams. Groups A and B are drawn from the top-ranked teams according to the IFF rankings, while Groups C and D are drawn from the remaining teams. Within a group, teams play against each other. The top two teams from Groups A and B advance directly to the quarter-finals. The other two teams from Groups A and B and the top two teams from Groups C and D compete in a playoff preliminary round.

Next, the playoffs are played by elimination. The eliminated teams, including the teams that did not qualify for the playoffs, participate in additional placement matches, including the bronze medal match.

The entire tournament spans nine days, from one weekend to another. During that time, teams play five to seven matches.

== Format history ==
The first World Championship in 1996 was preceded by two editions of the European Championship.

Until the 2008 World Championship, with the exception of the first tournament, teams were divided into divisions (A, B, and later C). In Division A, teams competed in two groups, with the top two teams from each group advancing to the semi-finals. The winners of the semi-finals played in the final, while the losing teams contested the bronze medal match. The bottom teams of both groups played for relegation from Division A, while the winner of Division B was promoted. Qualification was introduced for the 2010 World Championship, but only from 2014 onwards did all teams (except the host nation) have to qualify. Previously, the top teams from the previous championship received automatic qualification. The current system, where the higher-ranked teams are placed into two groups and the remaining teams into two separate groups, was introduced at the 2014 World Championship. After 2028, the qualification tournaments will be replaced by continental championships, from which 20 teams will newly qualify.

Until the 2006 World Championship, the tournament was held in May. After 2028, the interval between championships will be extended to four years, alternating with continental championships, and the tournament will be held in November.

The quarter-finals were first played in 2002, but became a permanent part of the format only from 2010 onwards. In 2014, the playoff preliminary round (round of 16) was introduced.

== Tournaments ==
Year	Final venue	Winners	Score	Runners-up	Third place	Score	Fourth place
1996; Details	(Sweden); Stockholm	Sweden	5–0	Finland	Norway	6–2	Czech Republic
1998; Details	(Czech Republic); Prague	Sweden	10–3	Switzerland	Finland	4–1	Denmark
2000; Details	(Norway); Oslo	Sweden	5–3	Finland	Switzerland	4–2	Denmark
2002; Details	(Finland); Helsinki	Sweden	6–4	Finland	Switzerland	4–3 OT	Czech Republic
2004; Details	(Switzerland); Zurich	Sweden	6–4	Czech Republic	Finland	8–7 PSO	Switzerland
2006; Details	(Sweden); Stockholm	Sweden	7–6 OT	Finland	Switzerland	9–4	Czech Republic
2008; Details	(Czech Republic); Prague	Finland	7–6 OT	Sweden	Switzerland	5–4 OT	Czech Republic
2010; Details	(Finland); Helsinki	Finland	6–2	Sweden	Czech Republic	9–3	Switzerland
2012; Details	(Switzerland); Zurich	Sweden	11–5	Finland	Switzerland	8–0	Germany
2014; Details	(Sweden); Gothenburg	Sweden	3–2	Finland	Czech Republic	4–3	Switzerland
2016; Details	(Latvia); Riga	Finland	4–3 PSO	Sweden	Switzerland	8–5	Czech Republic
2018; Details	(Czech Republic); Prague	Finland	6–3	Sweden	Switzerland	4–2	Czech Republic
2020; Details	(Finland); Helsinki	Sweden	6–4	Finland	Czech Republic	4–3 OT	Switzerland
2022; Details	(Switzerland); Zurich	Sweden	9–3	Czech Republic	Finland	5–3	Switzerland
2024; Details	(Sweden); Malmö	Finland	5–4 OT	Sweden	Czech Republic	8–2	Latvia
2026; Details	(Finland); Tampere						
2028; Details	(Czech Republic); Prague						

== Medal table ==
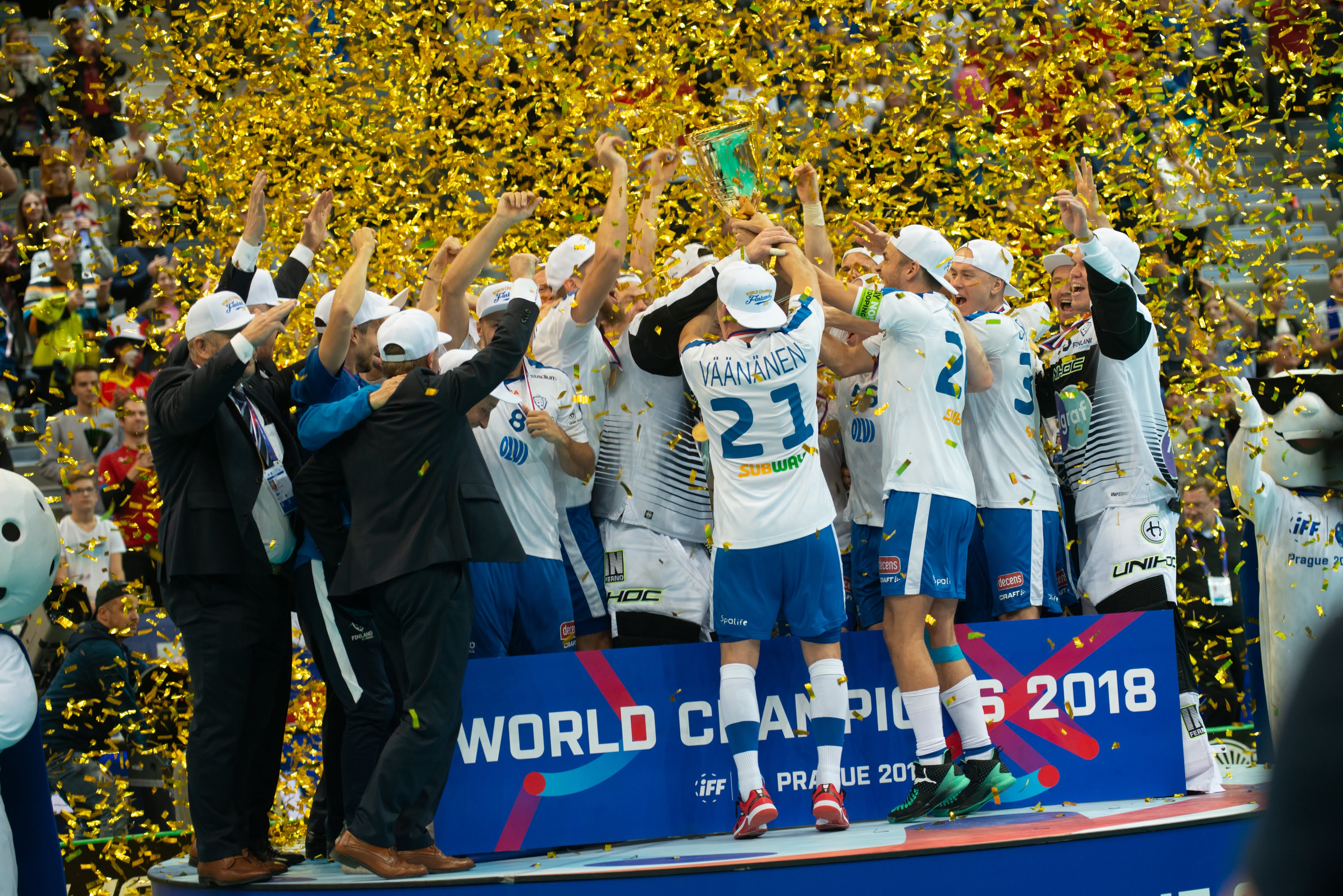
Finnish team celebrating the title in 2018 World Championships

Rank	Country	Gold	Silver	Bronze	Medals
1	Sweden	10	5	0	15
2	Finland	5	7	3	15
3	Czech Republic	0	2	4	6
4	Switzerland	0	1	7	8
5	Norway	0	0	1	1
Total		15	15	15	45

=== Participation details ===
Team	(Sweden) 1996	(Czech Republic) 1998	(Norway) 2000	(Finland) 2002	(Switzerland) 2004	(Sweden) 2006	(Czech Republic) 2008	(Finland) 2010	(Switzerland) 2012	(Sweden) 2014	(Latvia) 2016	(Czech Republic) 2018	(Finland) 2020	(Switzerland) 2022	(Sweden) 2024	(Finland) 2026	Years
Australia	-	-	-	-	-	-	-	14th	-	14th	15th	12th	WD	13th	15th	-	6
Austria	-	-	-	-	10th	-	-	-	-	-	-	-	-	-	-	-	1
Canada	-	-	-	-	-	-	-	11th	13th	12th	12th	11th	12th	12th	16th	Q	9
Czech Republic	4th	6th	6th	4th	2nd	4th	4th	3rd	7th	3rd	4th	4th	3rd	2nd	3rd	Q	16
Denmark	7th	4th	4th	6th	9th	6th	9th	13th	-	7th	5th	8th	10th	10th	10th	Q	15
Estonia	11th	-	-	-	-	-	8th	7th	9th	8th	8th	10th	8th	9th	9th	Q	11
Finland	2nd	3rd	2nd	2nd	3rd	2nd	1st	1st	2nd	2nd	1st	1st	2nd	3rd	1st	Q	16
Germany	8th	8th	-	8th	8th	10th	-	10th	4th	9th	7th	6th	9th	6th	8th	Q	14
Hungary	10th	-	-	-	-	-	-	-	14th	-	-	-	-	-	-	-	2
Italy	-	-	-	-	-	8th	10th	12th	-	-	-	-	-	-	-	-	3
Japan	-	-	-	-	-	-	-	15th	15th	15th	-	15th	WD	-	-	Q	5
Latvia	9th	-	7th	7th	6th	5th	5th	5th	6th	5th	10th	5th	5th	5th	4th	Q	15
Norway	3rd	5th	5th	5th	5th	7th	6th	6th	5th	6th	6th	7th	6th	8th	7th	Q	16
Philippines	-	-	-	-	-	-	-	-	-	-	-	-	14th	15th	11th	Q	4
Poland	-	-	-	-	-	-	-	9th	11th	-	13th	13th	11th	11th	12th	-	7
Russia	6th	7th	8th	-	7th	9th	7th	8th	10th	13th	-	-	-	-	-	-	9
Singapore	12th	-	-	-	-	-	-	16th	16th	-	16th	16th	16th	16th	-	Q	8
Slovakia	-	-	-	-	-	-	-	-	8th	10th	9th	9th	7th	7th	6th	Q	8
Slovenia	-	-	-	-	-	-	-	-	-	-	-	-	-	-	13th	Q	2
South Korea	-	-	-	-	-	-	-	-	-	16th	-	-	-	-	-	-	1
Sweden	1st	1st	1st	1st	1st	1st	2nd	2nd	1st	1st	2nd	2nd	1st	1st	2nd	Q	16
Switzerland	5th	2nd	3rd	3rd	4th	3rd	3rd	4th	3rd	4th	3rd	3rd	4th	4th	5th	Q	16
Thailand	-	-	-	-	-	-	-	-	-	-	14th	14th	13th	14th	14th	Q	6
United States	-	-	-	-	-	-	-	-	12th	11th	11th	-	15th	-	-	-	4
Debuts	12	0	0	0	1	1	0	4	2	1	1	0	1	0	1	0	
Cumulative	12	12	12	12	13	14	14	18	20	21	22	22	23	23	24	24	

== Gallery ==
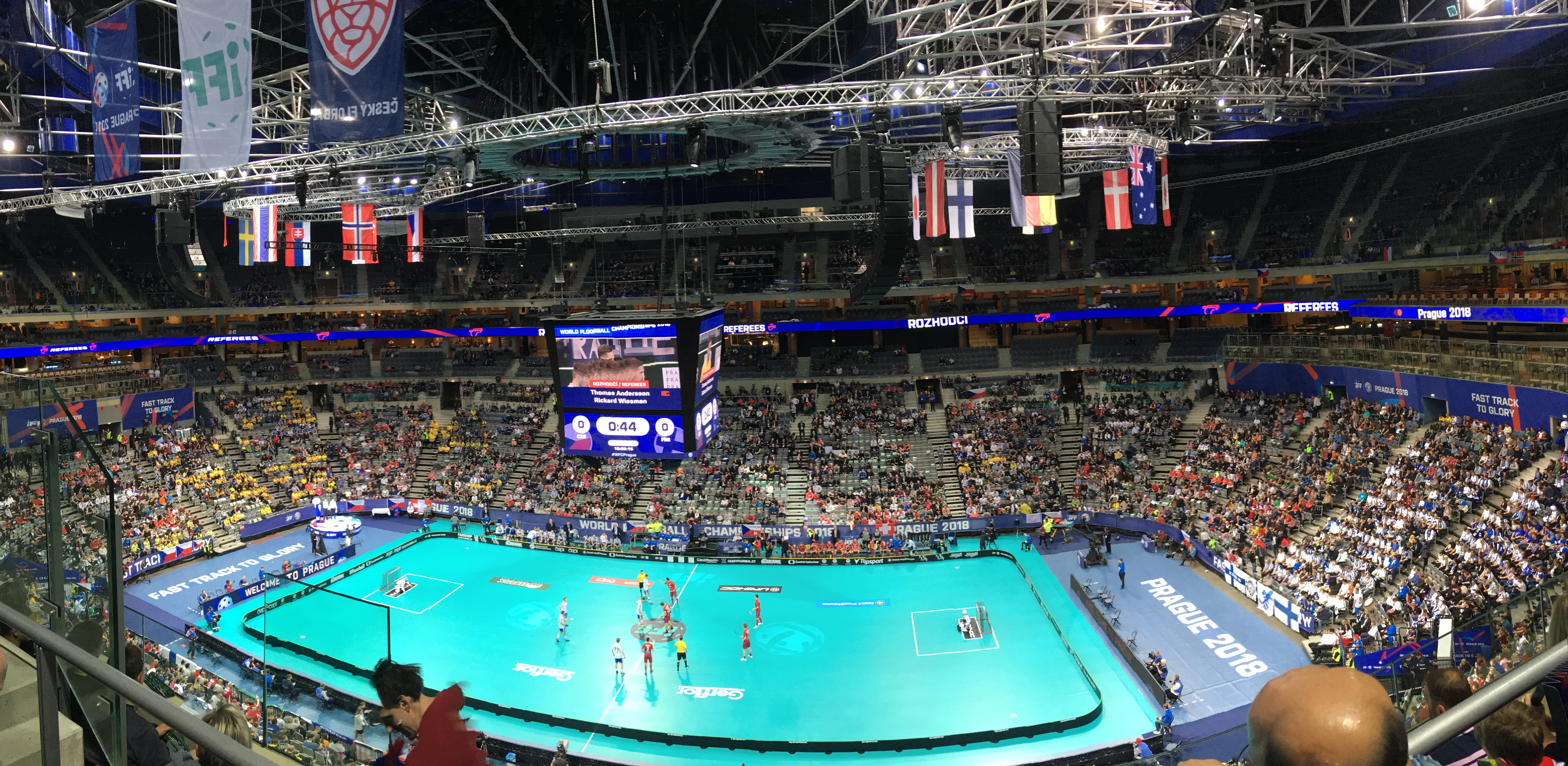
O_{2} arena in Prague during the 2018 World Championship

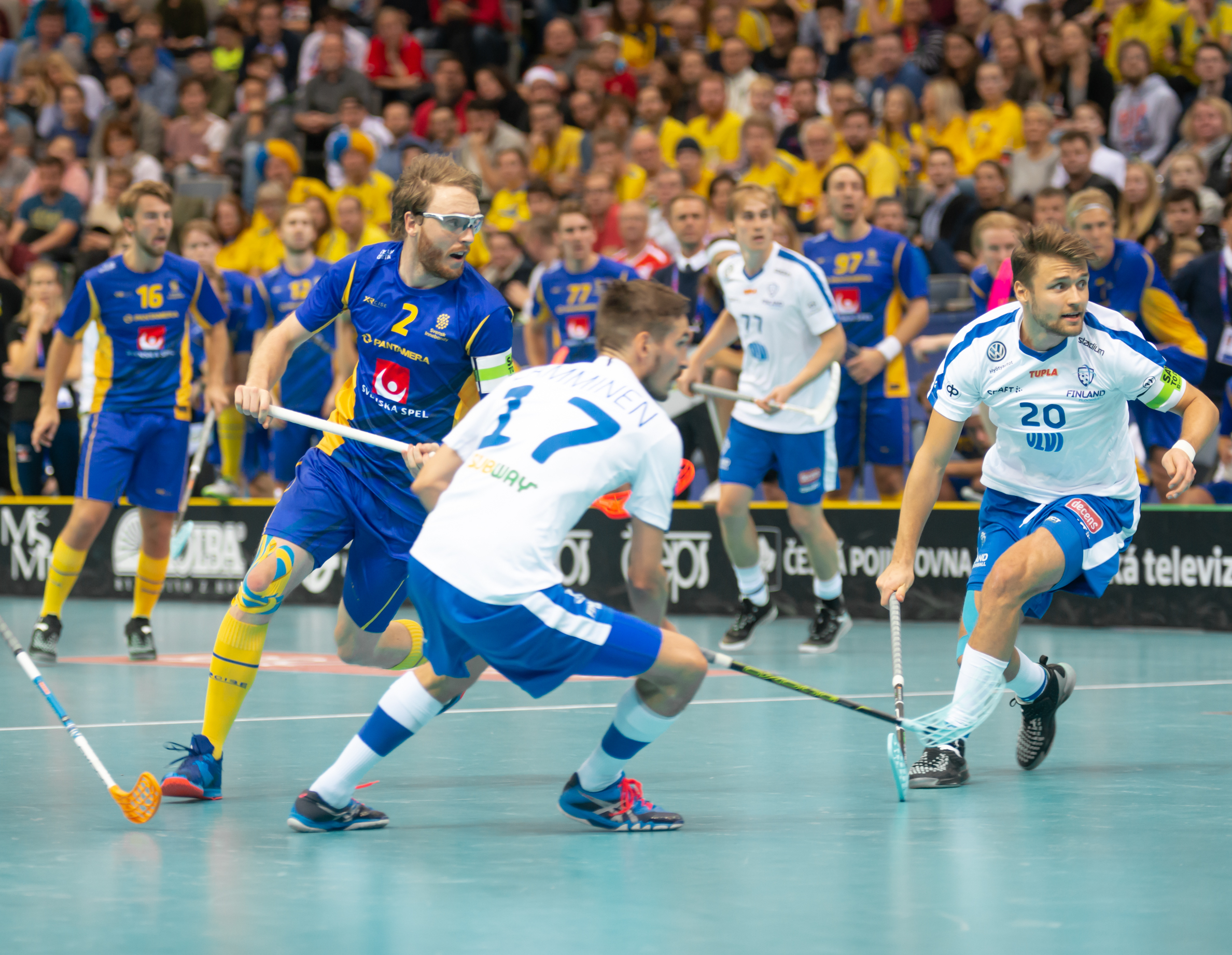
Final match Finland–Sweden at the 2018 World Championship

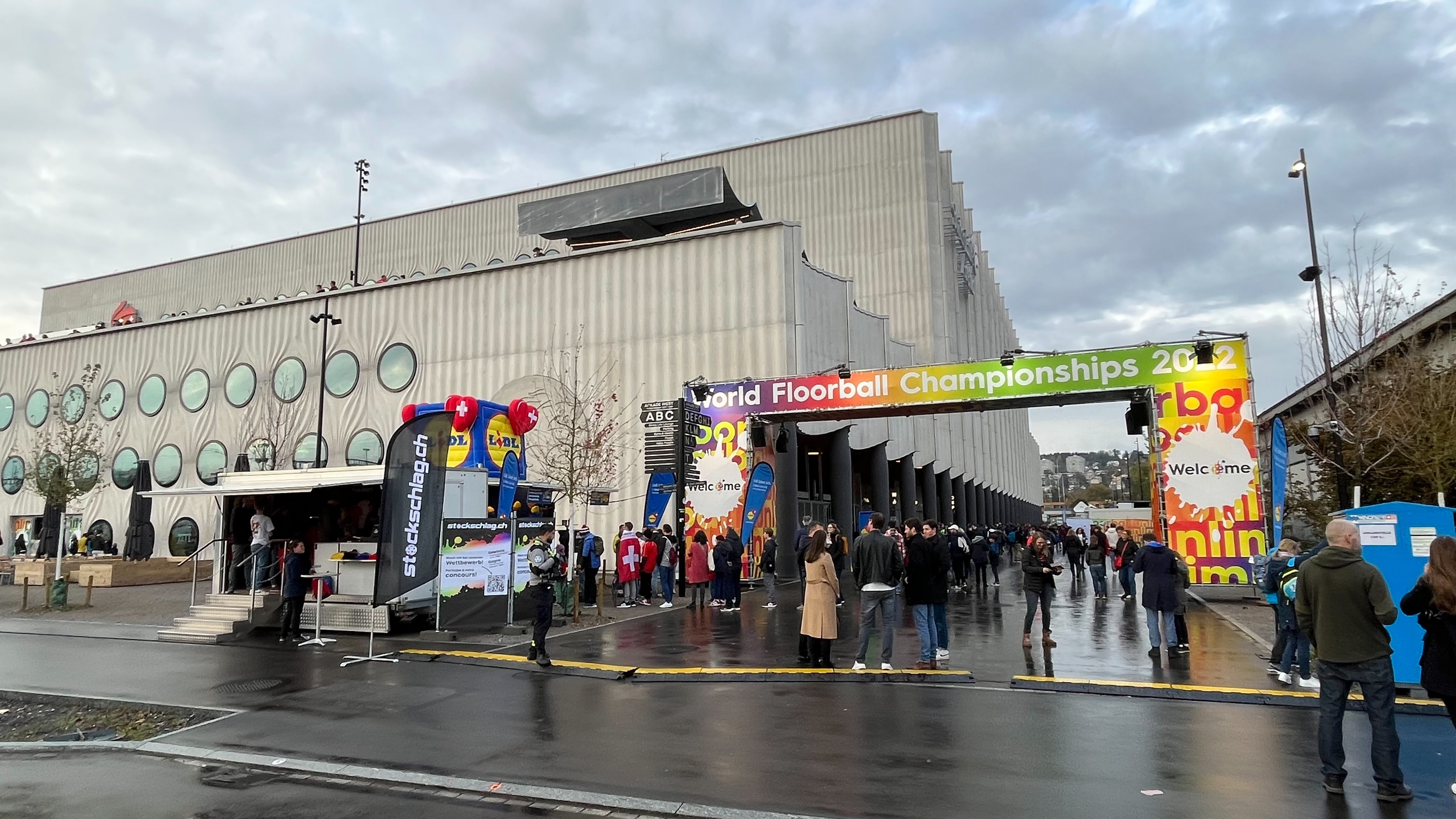
Swiss Life Arena during the 2022 World Championship

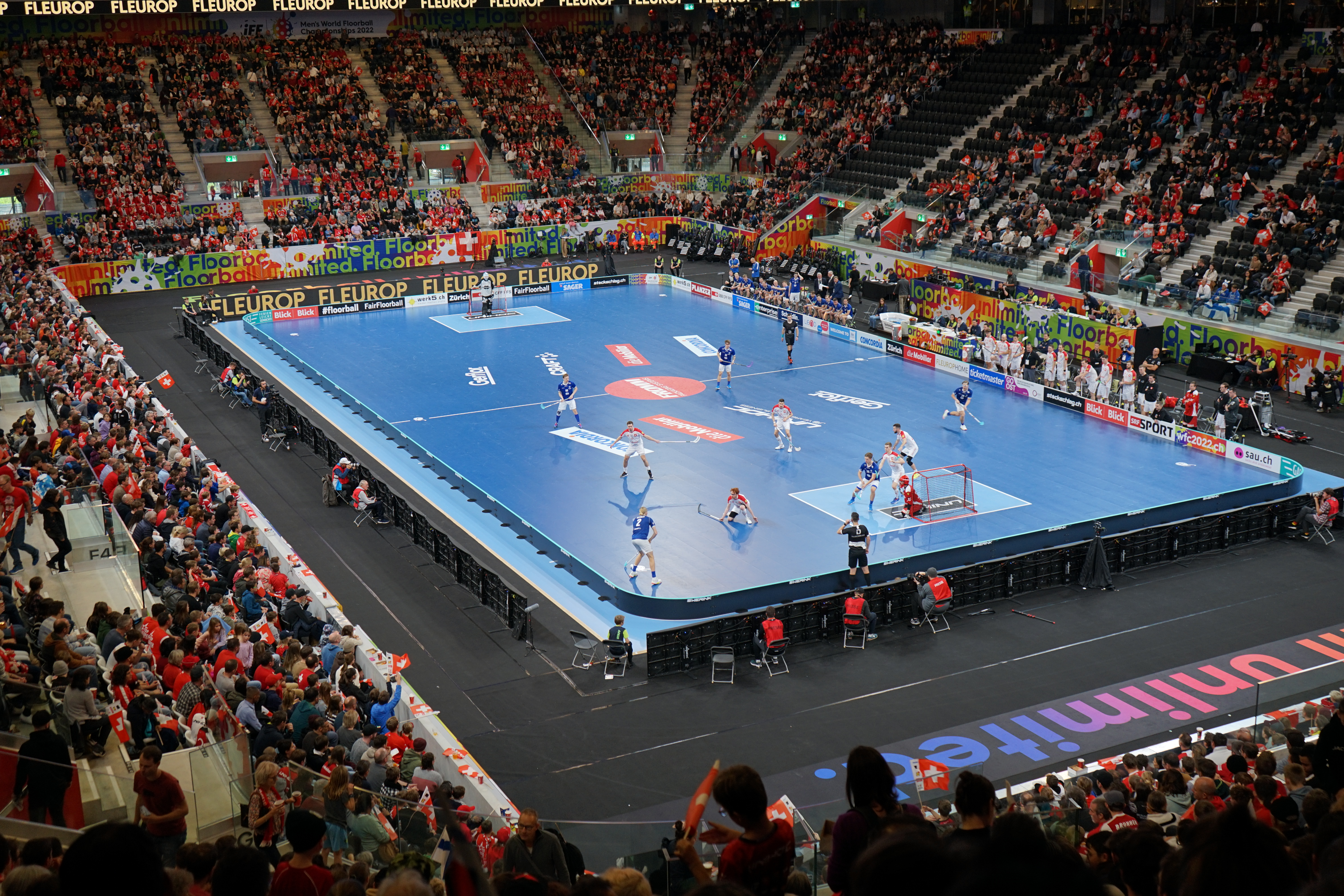
Match Finland–Switzerland at the 2022 World Championship

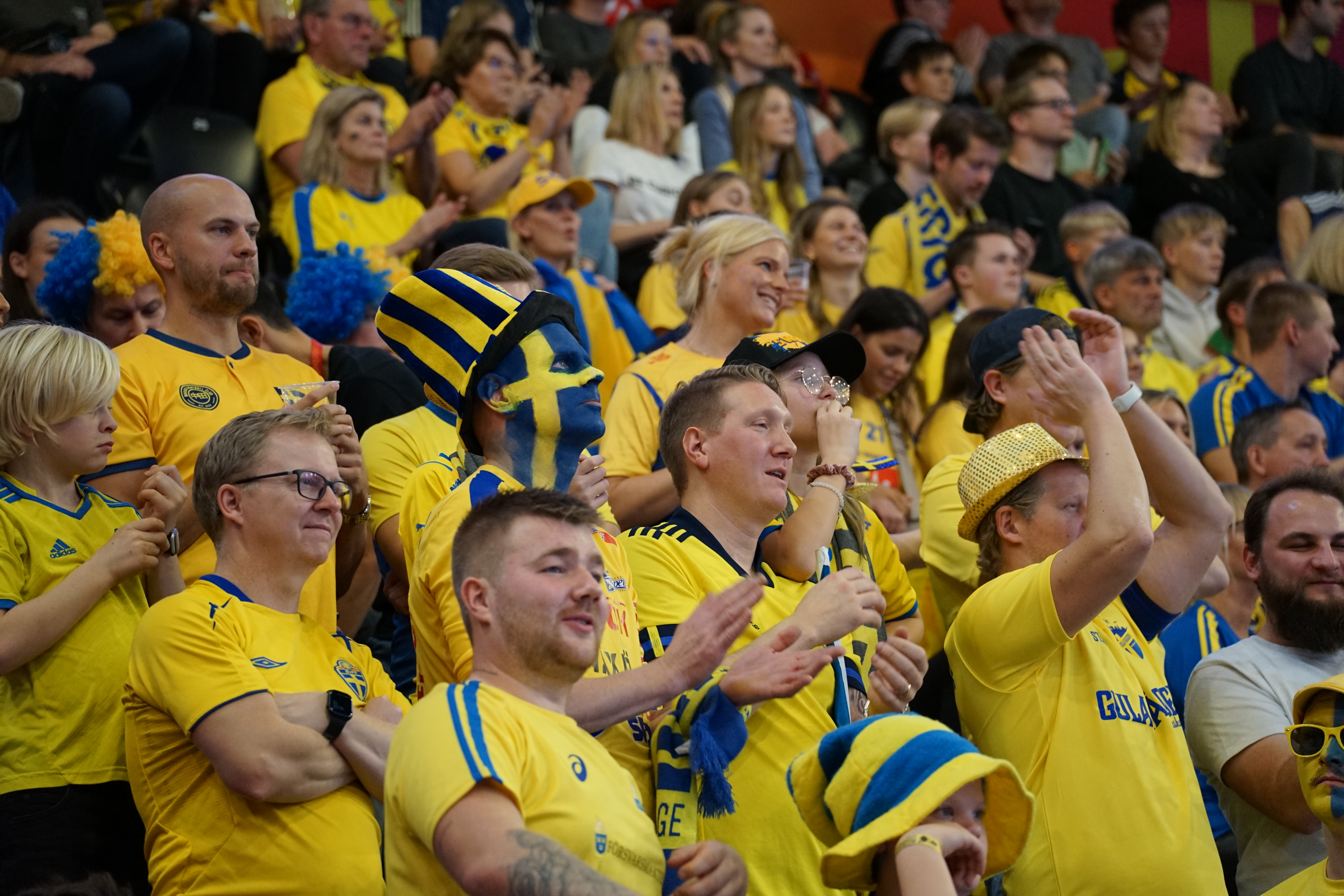
Swedish fans at the final match of the 2022 World Championship

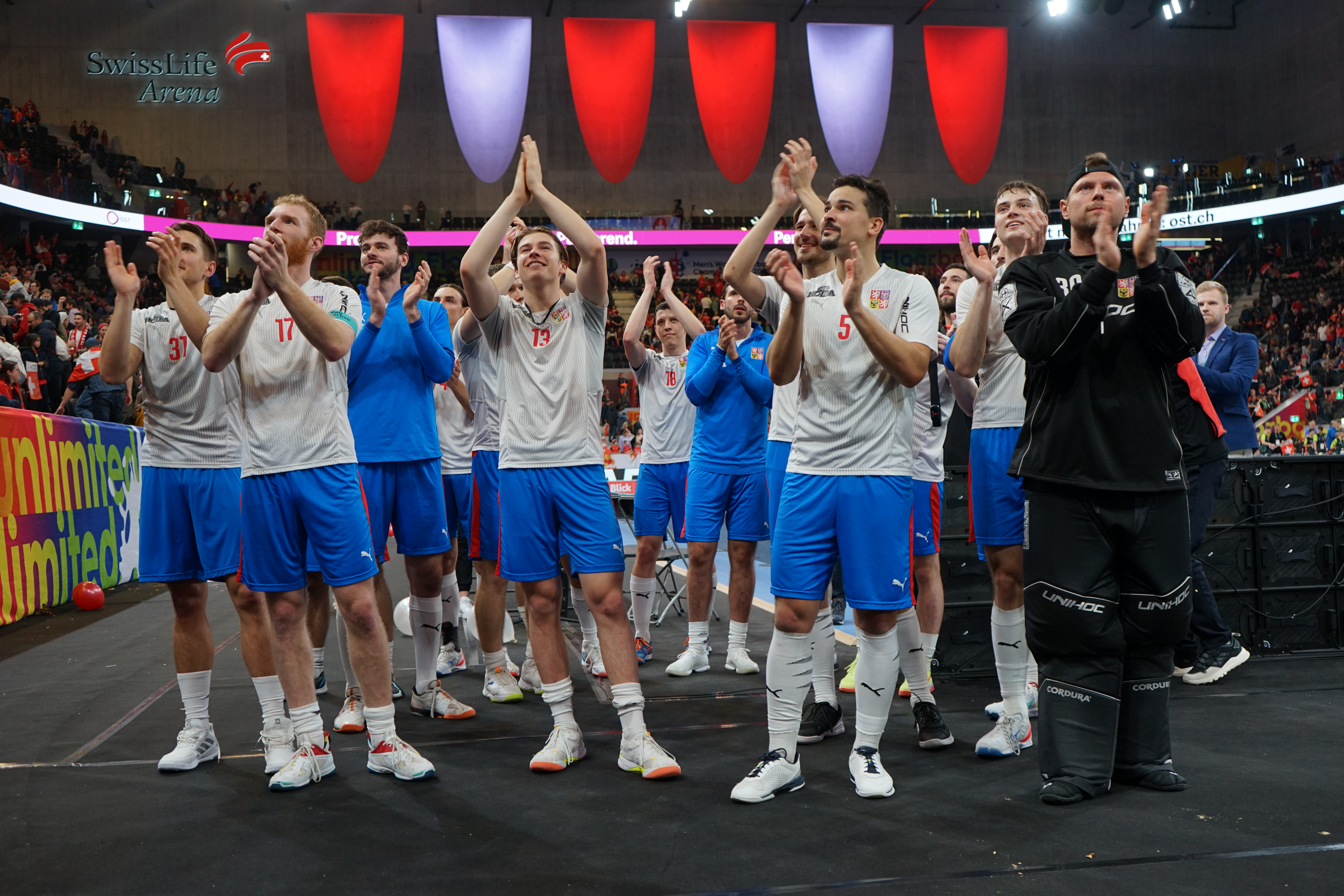
Czech national team after winning the semifinal at the 2022 World Championship

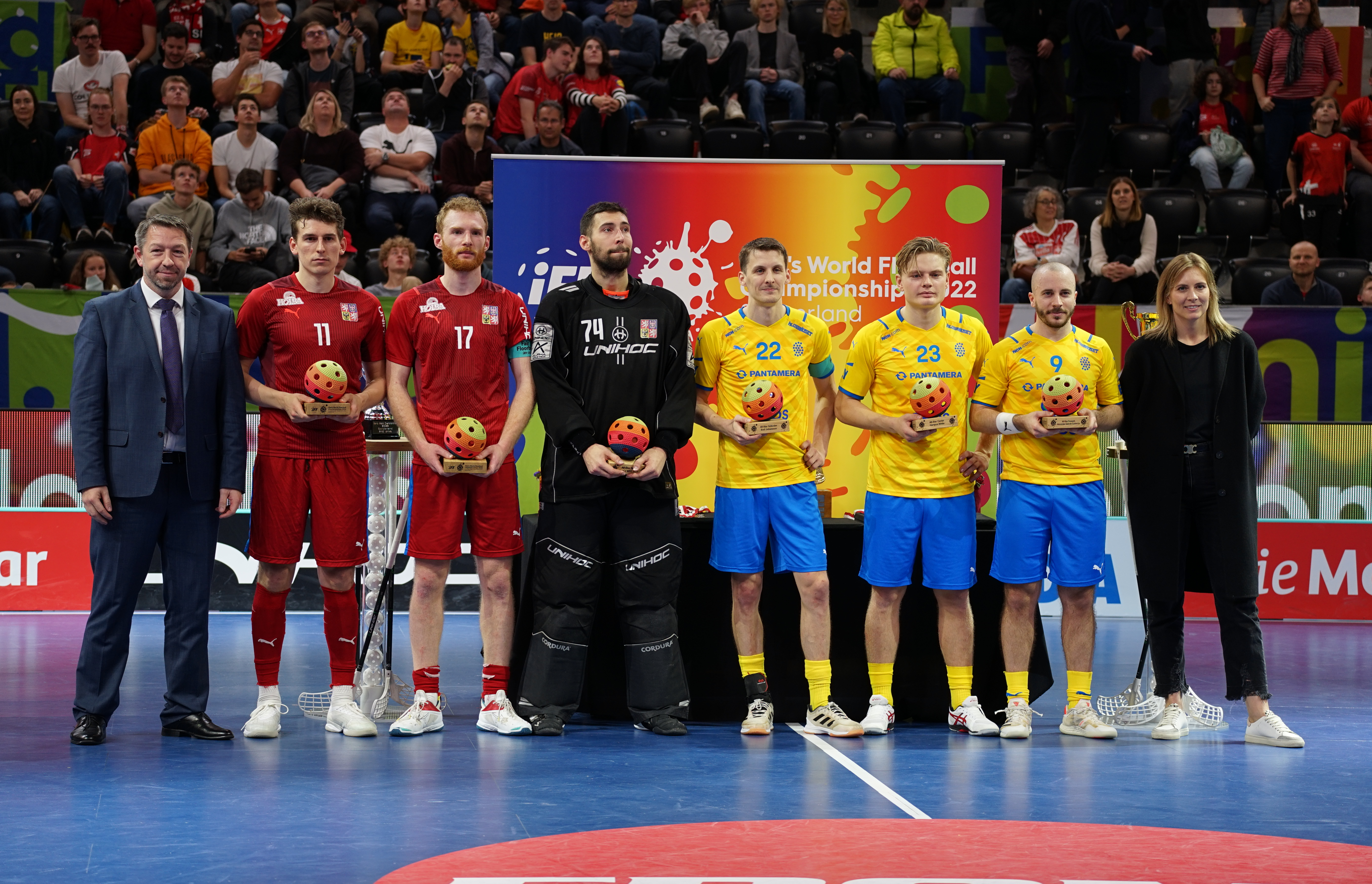
All-Star Team of the 2022 World Championship

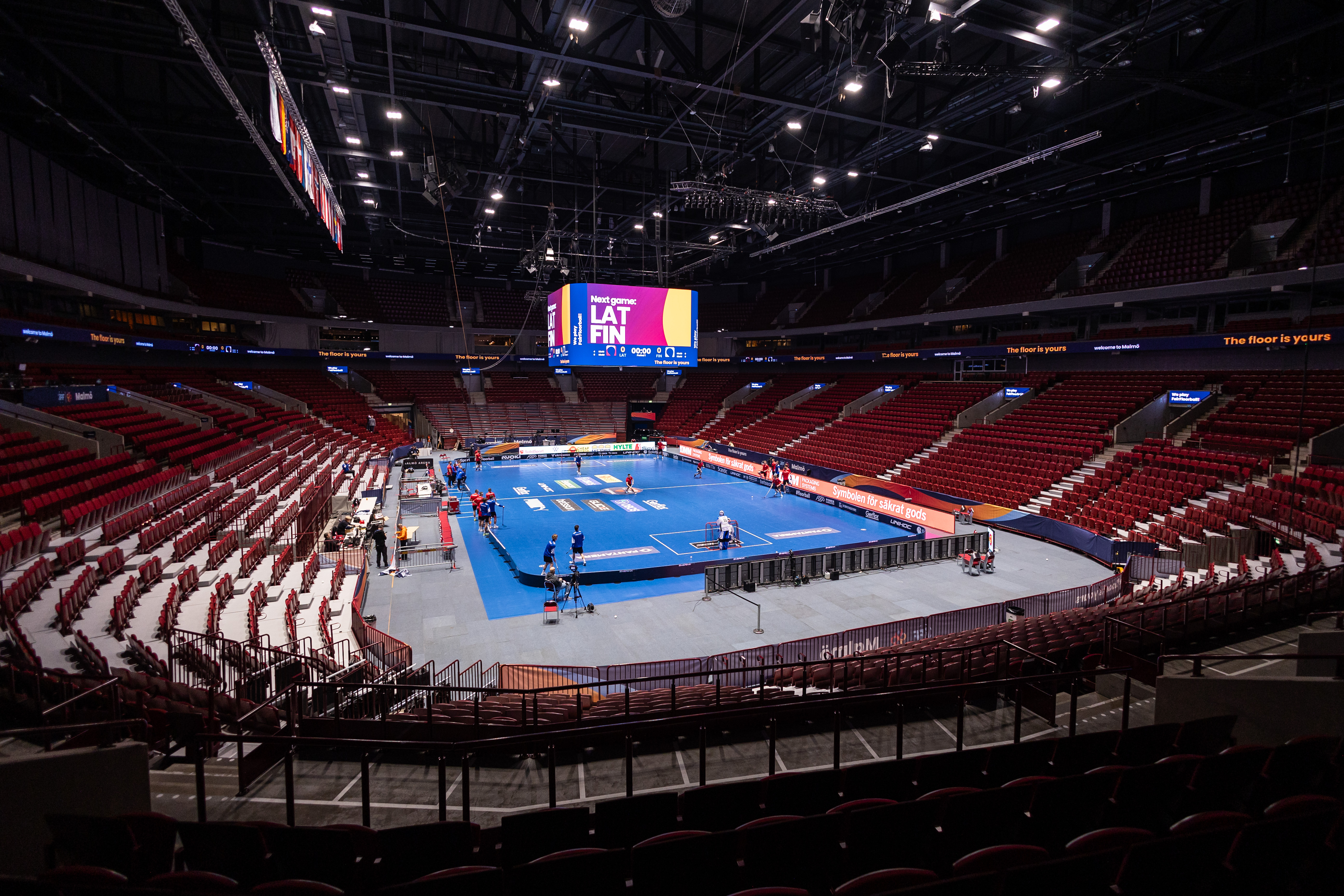
Malmö Arena ready for the first match of the 2024 World Championship Latvia–Finland

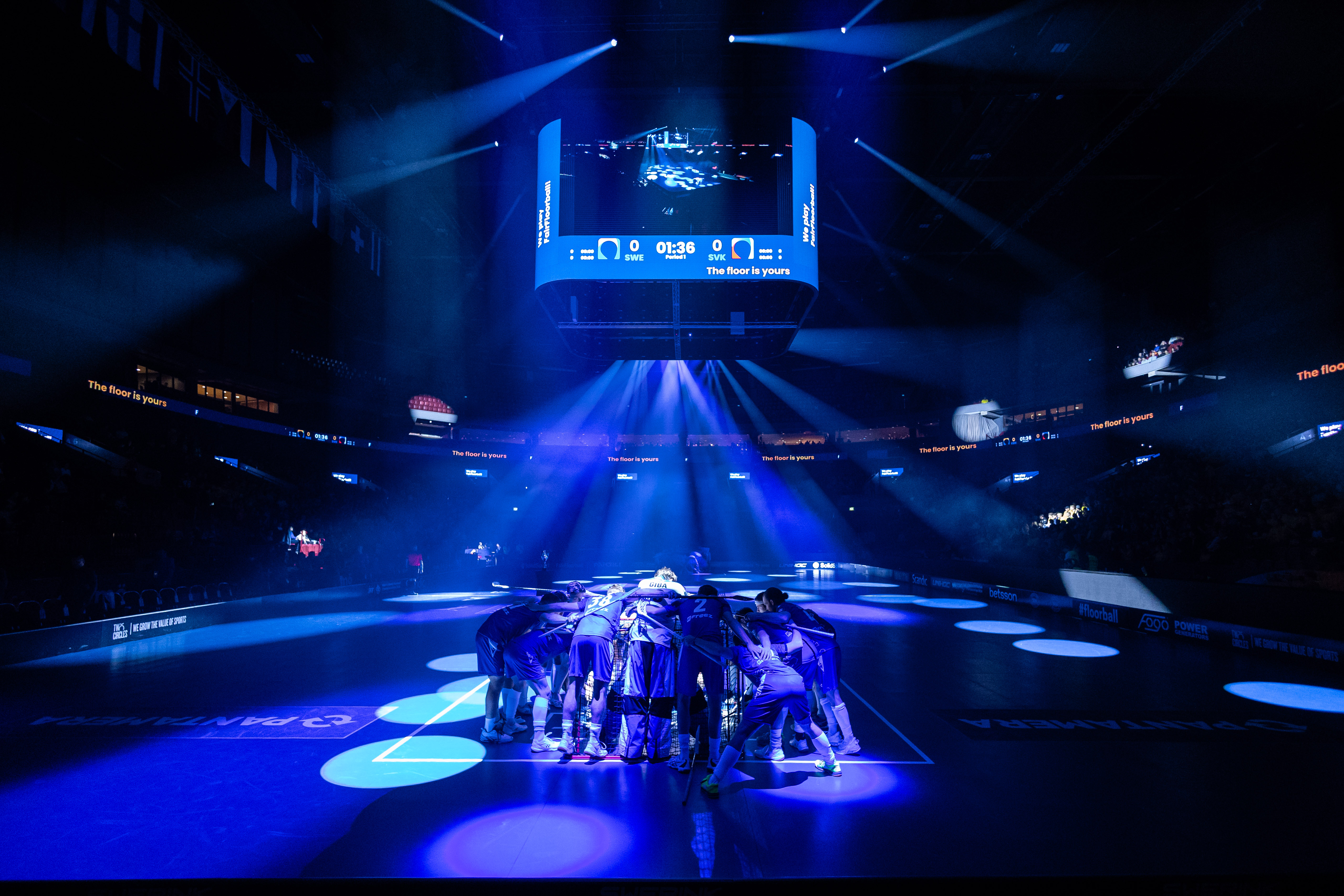
Malmö Arena before the Sweden–Slovakia match at the 2024 World Championship

== See also ==
- Women's World Floorball Championship
- Under-19 World Floorball Championships
- List of floorball world champions
