= Jānis Jansons =

Latvian floorball player (born 1982)

- Jānis Jansons during the 2007/2008 Latvian Floorball League season

Personal information
- Nationality: Latvia
- Born: December 28, 1982 (age 43)
- Height: 5 ft 8 in (173 cm)
- Weight: 187 lb (85 kg)

Sport
- Sport: Floorball
- Position: Centre
- Shoots: Right
- League: SSL
- Team: Pixbo Wallenstam IBK
- Turned pro: 1999

Jānis Jansons (born 28 December 1982, in Talsi) is a Latvian floorball player who is currently playing for Pixbo Wallenstam IBK in the SSL.

== National team ==
Jansons has played 21 games for the Latvian national team and collected 17 points. He has participated in six world floorball championships; 2000, 2002, 2004, 2006, 2008 and 2010.

"Reactive Jānis Jansons' - Jānis Jansons is the only Latvian player who played floorball in Mecca - Swedish super league. One of the most prominent Latvian national team player.

The first offer to play the Swedish elite league Jansons received in 2004. "Then we went to the Champions Cup tournament with Rubene team which was reinforced with another club's best player, and played with Pixbo 6:7! Pixbo head coach Jan Inge Forsberg came to me and offered to play with them. "Then Jansons was only 22 years old, and he decided to pursue studies. Followed by an offer from another Swedish giant - AIC, but the last moment all dispersed."

Now Jānis Jansons is back after 2 seasons in Latvian Lielvārde floorball club and now he is a playing coach, but the situation for a player playing in Sweden he explains as follows:

"When I returned to play in Latvia, I was upset that I am not as good as I thought at the beginning. However, looking at how Sweden fared Zhelezniye Czech superstar, the world's best goalkeeper Toivoniemi bags, and other samplings leaders who are unable to settle in this league, you realize that it's not that simple", a Swedish professional visitors nationalism is difficult to live with.

Jānis Jansons became the 2011/2012 season Latvia champion, with floorball club Lielvārde.

== Career statistics ==
Season	Team	League	GP	G	A	Pts	PIM
1999–2000	Roja	ME	—	—	—	—	—
2000–2001	Roja	ME	—	19	14	33	—
2001–2002	SK Latvijas Avīze	ME	19	23	20	43	20
2002–2003	SK Latvijas Avīze	ME	24	43	26	69	16
2003–2004	Ķekava	ME	17	12	5	17	6
2004–2005	Ķekava	ME	30	43	35	78	24
2005–2006	Ķekava	ME	28	43	27	70	26
2006–2007	Ķekava	ME	24	37	32	69	16
2007–2008	Talsi	ME	28	55	53	108	22
2008–2009	Talsi	ME	35	50	42	92	35
2009–2010	Pixbo Wallenstam IBK	SSL	23	3	2	5	4
Career Totals			170	213	198	411	130

Note: GP = Games played; G = Goals; A = Assists; Pts = Points; PIM = Penalties in Minutes
Note: Full statistics are unavailable
