= Kursi =

Kursi may refer to:

- Pulpit of God in Islam (Kursi may appear as chair or footstool in direct translations and is often confused with Al-ʽArsh / Throne of God in Islam in Islamic terminology)
- Kursi, local name for the Curonians, a Baltic tribe
- Kursi, Harju County, village in Kuusalu Parish, Harju County, Estonia
- Kursi, Jõgeva County, village in Põltsamaa Parish, Jõgeva County, Estonia
- Kursi, Lääne-Viru County, village in Tapa Parish, Lääne-Viru County, Estonia
- Kursi, Sea of Galilee, archaeological site at the foot of the Golan Heights
- Kursi, a subdistrict of Barabanki district, Uttar Pradesh, India
  - Kursi Assembly constituency,
- FK Kurši, a floorball team in Liepāja, Latvia

== See also ==
- Kuršiai, certain ethnic Kursenieki inhabitants of Lithuania and former East Prussia Latvian
