= 2000–01 Men's EuroFloorball Cup qualifying =

2000–01 Men's European Cup
Qualifying

Tournament details
- Host country: Czech Republic
- Dates: 10–11 August 2000
- Teams: 3 (from 3 countries)

Final positions
- Champions: (Poland) KS Szarotka (Germany) UH Löwen Leipzig

Tournament statistics
- Matches played: 3
- Goals scored: 16 (5.33 per match)
- All statistics correct as of 04:50, 22 August 2008 (UTC).

The 2000–01 Men's EuroFloorball Cup Qualifying rounds took place over 10 to 11 August 2000 in Prague, Czech Republic. The top 2 teams advanced to the 2000–01 Men's EuroFloorball Cup Finals where they had a chance to win the EuroFloorball Cup for 2000–01.

Only 3 teams attended the 2000–01 Qualifying Rounds, as a fourth team from Hungary was forced to pull out due to some unforeseen circumstances.

The 2000–01 EuroFloorball Cup marked the first year in which the International Floorball Federation changed the format to a two-year tournament.

The tournament was known as the 2000–01 Men's European Cup, but due to name implications, is now known as the 2000–01 Men's EuroFloorball Cup.

== Results ==
Pos	Team	Pld	W	D	L	GF	GA	GD	Pts
1	(Poland) KS Szarotka	2	2	0	0	7	2	+5	4
2	(Germany) UH Löwen Leipzig	2	1	0	1	5	6	−1	2
3	(Latvia) Ķekava FK	2	0	0	2	4	8	−4	0

10 August 2000

(Latvia) Ķekava FK	1–4	(Poland) KS Szarotka

Prague, Czech Republic

11 August 2000

(Poland) KS Szarotka	3–1	(Germany) UH Löwen Leipzig

Prague, Czech Republic

11 August 2000

(Germany) UH Löwen Leipzig	4–3	(Latvia) Ķekava FK

Prague, Czech Republic

== See also ==
- 2000–01 Men's EuroFloorball Cup Finals

Preceded by EuroFloorball Cup; 1999	Current: EuroFloorball Cup; 2000	Succeeded by EuroFloorball Cup; 2001
