= Pārgauja =

Latvian floorball club

- Founded: ????
- League: Latvian Floorball League
- Location: Stalbe parish, Latvia
- Home ground: Pārgaujas sporta nams
- Colors: Blue, Yellow
- Head coach: Ilvars Balodis

Pārgauja is a Latvian Floorball League team based in Stalbe parish, Latvia. Their most successful was 2016–17 season when Pārgauja lost the semi-finals against FK Lielvārde but won the bronze medals against FBK Valmiera.

== Goaltenders ==
- 20 (Latvia) Anrijs Vents
- 31 (Latvia) Valts Stūris
- 71 (Latvia) Ģirts Priedītis

== Defencemen ==
- 7 (Latvia) Andris Erenbots
- 8 (Latvia) Lauris Grāvelis
- 9 (Latvia) Ivo Balodis
- 10 (Latvia) Sandis Jānelsiņš
- 11 (Latvia) Ingus Balodis
- 12 (Latvia) Gatis Gailis

== Forwards ==
- 2 (Latvia) Nils Auziņš
- 13 (Latvia) Aivis Ādminis
- 19 (Latvia) Lauris Ābols
- 28 (Latvia) Rolands Jānelsiņš
- 69 (Latvia) Druvis Slišāns
- 77 (Latvia) Ralfs Priedītis
- 88 (Latvia) Mārtiņš Zelčs
