= Ketindihan =

2025 Indonesian film by Dyan Sunu Prastowo

- Theatrical release poster
- Directed by: Dyan Sunu Prastowo
- Written by: Widi Lestari
- Produced by: Chetan Samtani
- Starring: Haico Van der Veken; Kevin Ardilova; Donny Damara
- Cinematography: Akhmad Khomaini
- Edited by: Gita Miaji
- Music by: Indra Qadarsih
- Production companies: Im-a-gin-e; MVP Pictures; Anami Films; Ten Cuts; Tobali Films; A&Z Films
- Release date: January 9, 2025 (Indonesia)
- Running time: 96 minutes
- Country: Indonesia
- Language: Indonesian

Ketindihan is a 2025 Indonesian supernatural horror film directed by Dyan Sunu Prastowo and written by Widi Lestari. The film stars Haico Van der Veken, Kevin Ardilova, and Donny Damara, and is about a tennis athlete who suffers from sleep paralysis. The film premiered in Indonesia on 9 January 2025 and on Netflix on 15 May 2025.

== Plot ==
Tania is a tennis athlete under pressure from her dad, who has ambitions for her to win the Olympic gold. One night, she is chatting with her friends, and Silmi tells of the phenomenon of sleep paralysis caused by an evil spirit called Beuno. Tania, who disbelieves such a thing, tries the ritual to summon Beuno. Later that night, Nurul sleepwalks and falls to her death. A week after Nurul's death, Tania starts seeing apparitions and feels the presence of Beuno, making her fight with her brother Timo over mysterious love bites, strange and almost kill Leona after practice.

One day, Tania receives news that Silmi died horribly. Timo also dies after reporting to his and Tania's parents that she has had sex with her boyfriend Coki. When realising that all these is due to Beuno, she rushes to Coki's house to warn him, but she suffered an accident on the way. Meanwhile, Coki accidentally blenders his own hand. Her father also suffers from sleep paralysis.

At the hospital, Ustadzah Rifa says to Tania that she is being followed by an evil spirit, which attacks at 3.15am. She guides her to recite the Throne Verse to banish it. Not long after, Coki dies. Tania moves on with her life and manages to become a tournament champion.

An emotionally-confused girl calls out Beuno's name three times and asks it to come to her dreams that night, and an apparition appears behind her.

== Cast ==
- Haico Van der Veken as Tania
- Kevin Ardilova as Coki, Tania's toxic boyfriend
- Donny Damara as Beni, Tania's father and trainer
- Wulan Guritno as Samantha, Tania's mother
- Ali Fikry as Timo, Tania's younger brother
- Zee Zee Shahab as Ustadzah Riza
- Agnes Naomi as Leona, Tania's friend
- Gesya Shandy as Silmi, Tania's friend
- Luana Dutra as Nurul, Tania's friend who killed herself sleepwalking
- Satria Towel as Beuno
- Jenny Zhang as beauty doctor
- Frissly Herlind as emotionally-confused girl
- Suheil Bisyir as Moe
- Bintang Satria as Cikur
- Andrie Tawaqal as Lare
- Ryan Goutama as Tania's Tennis friend

== Production ==
Luana Dutra, who plays as the ghost in this film, has to endure six hours of prosthetic makeup without moving at all.
