= Kurši =

Kurši may refer to:

- FK Kurši, floorball team from Latvia
- Kursenieki, Baltic tribe
