= Al-Baqarah 285–286 =

Verses in the second chapter of the Quran

Al-Baqarah verses 285–286 (Quran 2:285–286), also known "treasure from the Throne of Allah", are the final two verses of the second chapter of the Quran. Islamic tradition holds that these verses were revealed to Muhammad during the Night Journey and Ascension (Isra and Miʿraj) without the intermediation of the angel Gabriel (Jibril). Muslim sources generally describe most Qur’anic revelations as being delivered through Gabriel.

According to Abd Allah ibn Mas'ud, the Prophet during the Night Journey and Ascension was granted the four bestowings, one of them included these two verses and hence they hold exceptional theological and devotional value. The last two verses and the five daily prayers are among the most essential spiritual endowments granted to the Ummah. Muslims are encouraged to recite these verses regularly, especially before sleeping, as a means of getting huge reward throughout night while sleeping and seeking protection from the devils.

According to some exegetical authorities, the recitation of these verses may substitute the reward of the tahajjud prayer.

According to a hadith, when the final verse was revealed and the Prophet was reciting it, after each word it was said to him “granted”.

== Recitation, text and translations ==
Al-Baqarah 285-286
Recitation of Al-Baqarah verses 285-286, taken from a full recitation of Surah Al-Baqarah.

=== Arabic ===
آمَنَ الرَّسُولُ بِمَا أُنزِلَ إِلَيْهِ مِن رَّبِّهِ وَالْمُؤْمِنُونَ ۚ كُلٌّ آمَنَ بِاللَّهِ وَمَلَائِكَتِهِ وَكُتُبِهِ وَرُسُلِهِ لَا نُفَرِّقُ بَيْنَ أَحَدٍ مِّن رُّسُلِهِ ۚ وَقَالُوا سَمِعْنَا وَأَطَعْنَا ۖ غُفْرَانَكَ رَبَّنَا وَإِلَيْكَ الْمَصِيرُ لَا يُكَلِّفُ اللَّهُ نَفْسًا إِلَّا وُسْعَهَا ۚ لَهَا مَا كَسَبَتْ وَعَلَيْهَا مَا اكْتَسَبَتْ ۗ رَبَّنَا لَا تُؤَاخِذْنَا إِن نَّسِينَا أَوْ أَخْطَأْنَا ۚ رَبَّنَا وَلَا تَحْمِلْ عَلَيْنَا إِصْرًا كَمَا حَمَلْتَهُ عَلَى الَّذِينَ مِن قَبْلِنَا ۚ رَبَّنَا وَلَا تُحَمِّلْنَا مَا لَا طَاقَةَ لَنَا بِهِ ۖ وَاعْفُ عَنَّا وَاغْفِرْ لَنَا وَارْحَمْنَا ۚ أَنتَ مَوْلَانَا فَانصُرْنَا عَلَى الْقَوْمِ الْكَافِرِينَ

=== English ===
285: "The Messenger has believed in what was revealed to him from his Lord, and [so have] the believers. All of them have believed in Allah and His angels and His books and His messengers, [saying], ‘We make no distinction between any of His messengers.' And they say, ;We hear and we obey. [Grant us] Your forgiveness, our Lord. To You is the [final] destination.'"
286: "Allah does not burden a soul beyond that it can bear. It will have [the consequence of] what [good] it has gained, and it will bear [the consequence of] what [evil] it has earned. Our Lord, do not impose blame upon us if we forget or make a mistake. Our Lord, and lay not upon us a burden like that which You laid upon those before us. Our Lord, and burden us not with that which we have no ability to bear. And pardon us; and forgive us; and have mercy upon us. You are our protector, so give us victory over the disbelieving people."

== Interpretation and tradition ==
Classical and modern scholars agree that these verses encapsulate the essence of Islamic faith and practice. The first verse (2:285) affirms belief in all messengers and divine scriptures, while the second verse (2:286) assures believers that Allah does not burden anyone beyond their capacity and teaches supplications for forgiveness, mercy, and victory.

The verses also address concerns raised by the preceding verse (2:284), clarifying that believers are not held accountable for unintentional thoughts or mistakes, but only for deliberate actions.

Ibn Masood relates: "When the Prophet ascended, he was given the last verses of Surah al-Baqarah from a treasure beneath the Throne." (Sahih Muslim). This context underscores why these verses are considered a divine gift and a source of mercy for the Muslim community.

Other famously stated Hadith includes:

"Whoever recites the last two verses of Surah Al-Baqarah at night, they will suffice him."

— Sahih al-Bukhari 5040

"Allah inscribed a book two thousand years before He created the heavens and the earth, from which the last two verses of Sūrat al-Baqarah were revealed. If they are recited for three nights in a home, no devil will come near it."

— Jami` at-Tirmidhi 2882

"While I was with Jibreel, I suddenly heard a noise from above. Jibreel lifted his sight to the sky and said, ‘This is a door in the heavens being opened, and it has never been opened before now.’ An angel descended and said, ‘Receive the good news of two lights that have been given to you, which no prophet before you was given: the Opening of the Book (Al-Fatiha) and the last verses of Al-Baqarah. You will never recite a word from them except that you will be given (reward).'"

— Sahih Muslim, Hadith 806

== See also ==
- Al-Baqarah
- Throne Verse
- Al-Fatiha

== Bibliography ==
- David James (1988). Qur'ans of the Mamluks. London: Alexandria Press. ISBN 9780500973677.
