= Ventspils Coach Terminal =

Bus station in Ventspils, Latvia

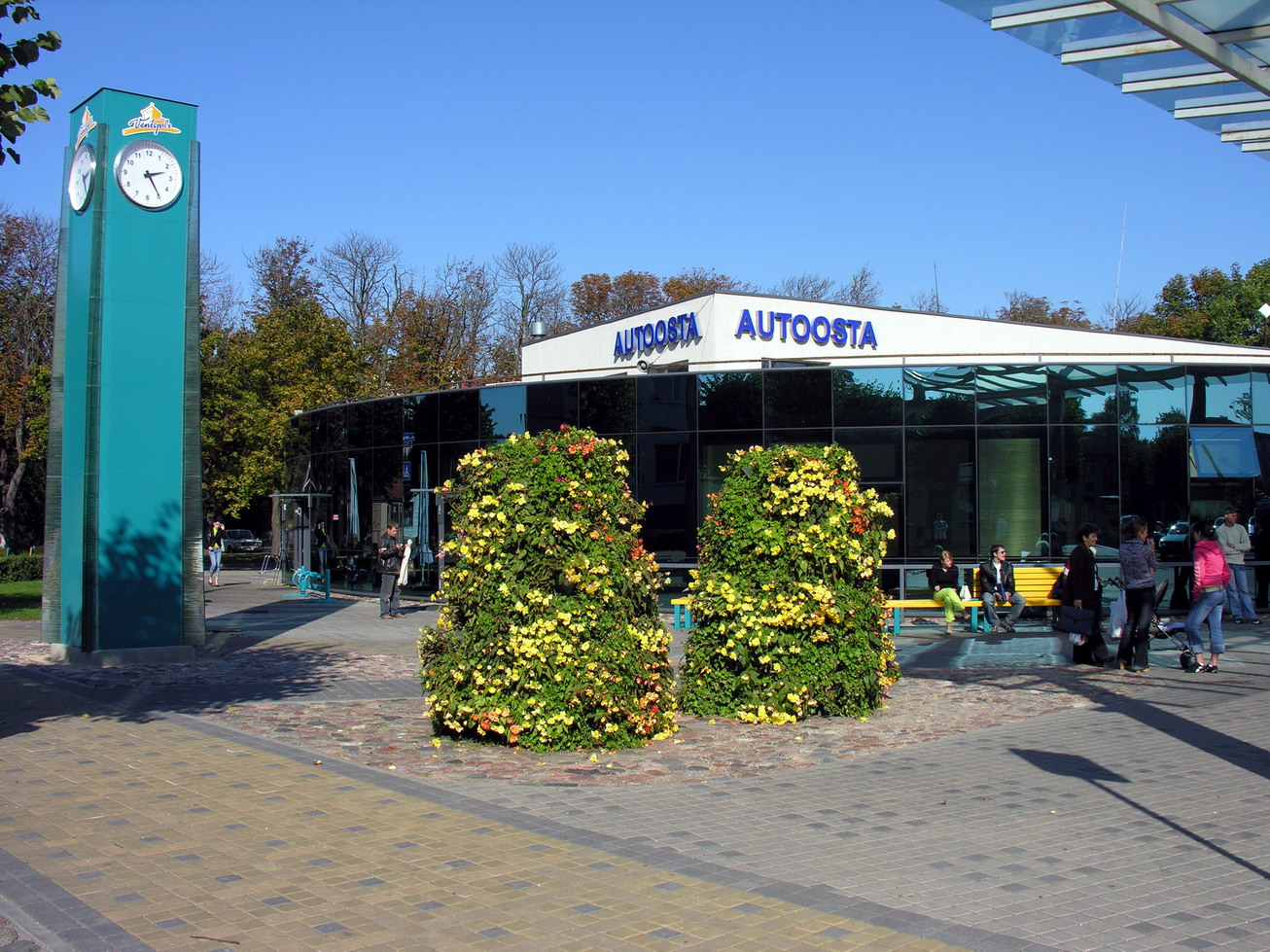

General information
- Location: 5 Kuldigas Street, Ventspils; Latvia
- Coordinates: 57°23′41″N 21°34′11″E
- Owner: Ventspils reiss
- Platforms: 5 bus bays

Construction
- Parking: yes
- Cycle facilities: yes

History
- Opened: 1960
Location

Ventspils Coach Terminal (Latvian: Ventspils autoosta; often abbreviated Ventspils AO) is the central bus station for inter-city services in Ventspils, Latvia. The terminal is owned by Ventspils reiss, a limited liability company of Ventspils city municipality.

== History ==
Although the first inter-city coach services appeared in 1924, there was not any official bus terminal. In 1950s the central bus station was located nearby the Town Hall square. The present coach terminal was built in 1960, however due to bad conditions it was successfully reconstructed in 2001, furthermore, one year later it was recognized as the best one in Latvia.

== Services ==
Some of the routes include cities like Riga, Kuldīga, Liepāja, Talsi, Tukums and Jelgava. From this bus station it is possible to go to the nearby villages as well. In 2014 it was decided to open a new route to Kolka during the summer season.

As Ventspils is a relatively small city many people decide to go on foot to the terminal, however it is also possible to take taxi or public transport.
