= SK Blāzma (floorball club) =

Blāzma
- Founded: ????
- League: Men's Highest Floorball League of Latvia
- Location: Rēzekne, Latvia
- Home ground: Rēzeknes sporta nams
- Colors: Blue, White
- Head coach: Jānis Kārkliņš
- Parent group: Blāzma

SK Blāzma was a Men's Highest Floorball League of Latvia team based in Rēzekne, Latvia.

== Goaltenders ==
- 1 (Latvia) Valdis Jukna
- 2 (Latvia) Deniss Višņakovs
- 16 (Latvia) Valērijs Bodnieks
- 55 (Latvia) Alesis Cibanjuks

== Defencemen ==
- 6 (Latvia) Vitālijs Terezkins
- 7 (Latvia) Romāns Gemma
- 9 (Latvia) Dairis Dikuļs-Dikaļs
- 14 (Latvia) Ēriks Čate
- 25 (Latvia) Artūrs Satkuns
- 68 (Latvia) Jurijs Ivenkovs
- 86 (Latvia) Intars Bērziņš

== Forwards ==
- 8 (Latvia) Andrejs Cvetkovs
- 10 (Latvia) Igors Kalnačs
- 11 (Latvia) Maksims Terehovs
- 12 (Latvia) Aleksandrs Kotovs
- 14 (Latvia) Ēriks Čate
- 15 (Russia) Pavel Semenov
- 20 (Latvia) Viktors Počkajevs
- 21 (Latvia) Deniss Kotovs
- 22 (Russia) Valeriy Maslov
- 30 (Russia) Roman Druzhininskiy
- 33 (Latvia) Aleksandrs Grehovs
- 77 (Latvia) Evgenijs Saveļjevs
- 99 (Latvia) Valērijs Brīvers
