= Al-Baqarah =

2nd chapter of the Quran

Surah 2 of the Quran
الْبَقَرَة Al Baqarah The Heifer
- Qira'ah; English text
- Classification: Medinan
- Position: Juzʼ 1–3
- Hizb no.: 1, 2, 3, 4 and 5
- No. of verses: 286
- No. of Rukus: 40
- No. of words: 6116
- No. of letters: 25900

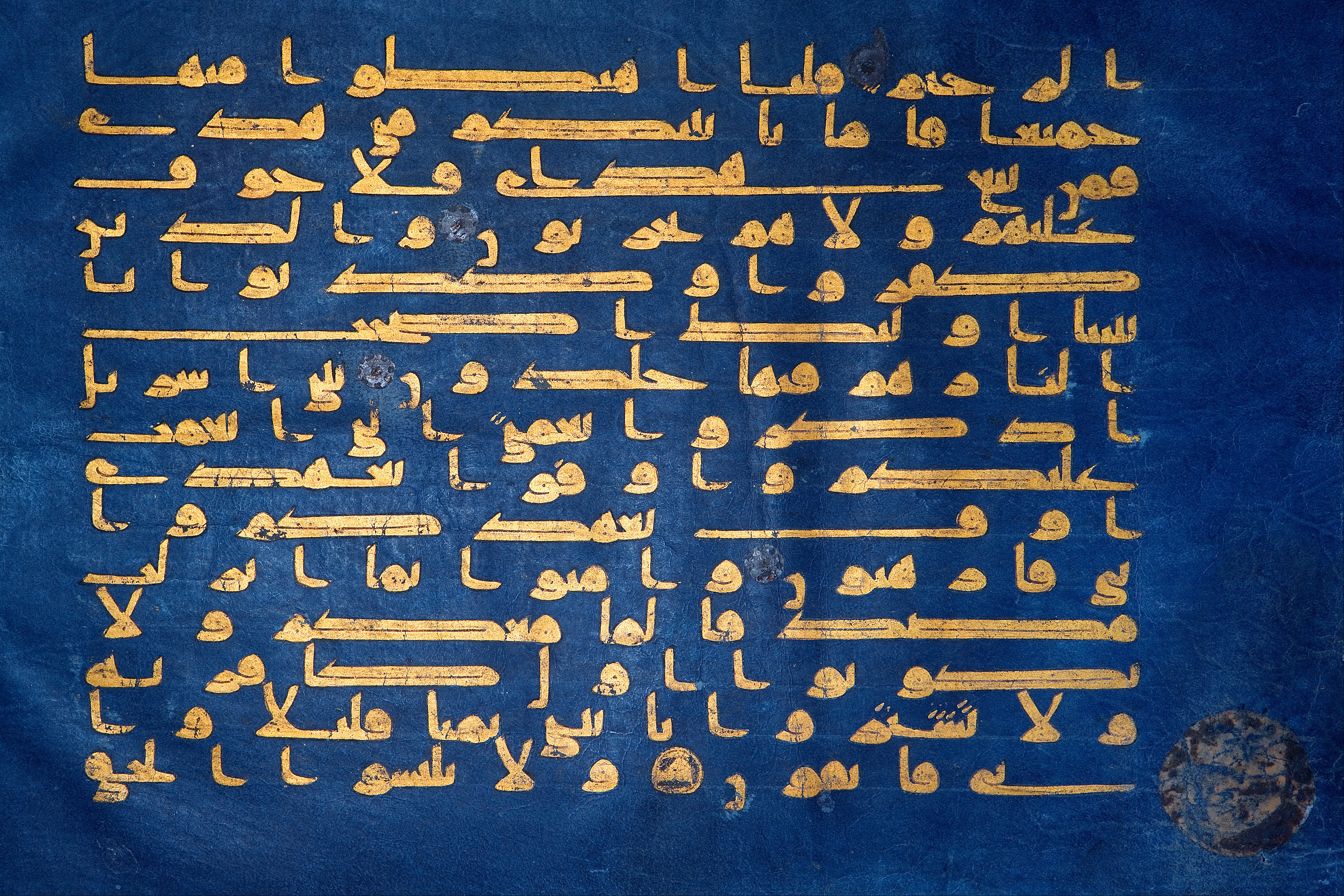
Folio from the Blue Quran with the fragment of the chapter Al-Baqara. Museum of Islamic Art, Doha.

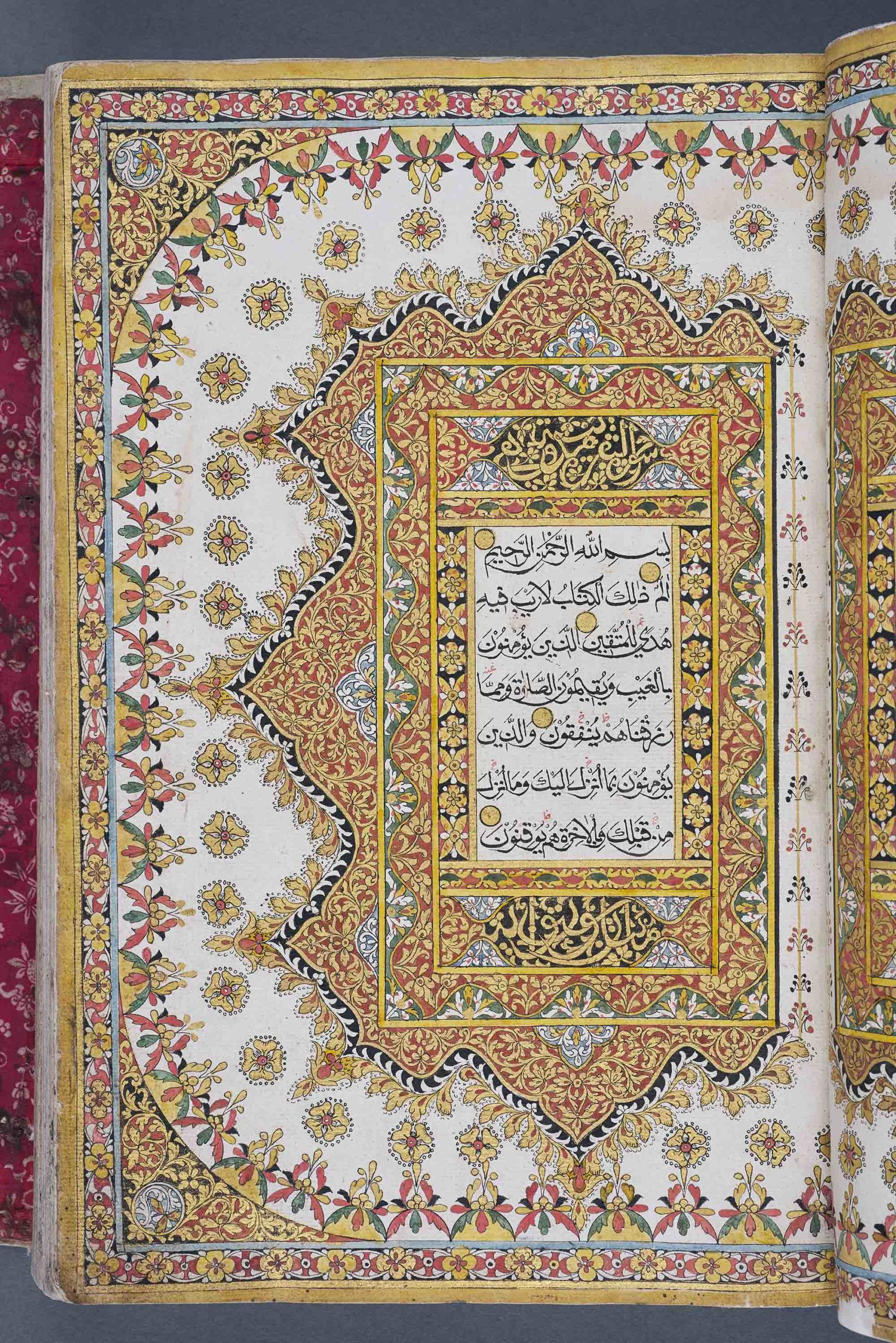
Left-side of a Double-page Opening of the Quran from Terengganu with beginning of the chapter Al-Baqara. End of the 18th or 19th century. Asian Civilisations Museum.

Al-Baqarah (Arabic: الْبَقَرَة, ’al-baqarah; lit. "The Heifer" or "The Cow"), also spelled as Al-Baqara, is the second and longest chapter (surah) of the Quran. It consists of 286 verses (āyāt) which begin with the "muqatta'at" letters alif (ا), lām (ل), and mīm (م). The Verse of Loan (the longest single verse of the Quran), the Throne Verse (the greatest verse), and the last 2 verses, Treasures of the Throne are in this chapter.

The sūrah encompasses a variety of topics and contains several commands for Muslims such as enjoining fasting on the believer during the month of Ramadan; forbidding interest or usury (riba); and several other famous verses such as the last two verses, which came from the treasure under Allah's Throne, and the verse of no compulsion in religion. The sūrah addresses a wide variety of topics, including substantial amounts of law, and retells stories of Adam, Ibrahim (Abraham) and Mūsa (Moses). A major theme is guidance: urging the pagans (Al-Mushrikeen) and the Jews of Medina to embrace Islam, and warning them and the hypocrites (Munafiqun) of the fate God had visited in the past on those who failed to heed his call. The surah is also believed to be a means of protection from the jinn.

Al-Baqara is believed by Muslims to have been revealed in a span of 10 years starting from 622 in Medina after the Hijrah, with the exception of the riba verses which Muslims believe were revealed during the Farewell Pilgrimage, the last Hajj of Muhammad. In particular, verse 281 is believed to be the last verse of the Quran to be revealed, on the 10th day of Dhu al-Hijja 10 A.H., when Muhammad was in the course of performing his last Hajj, 07 or 09 or 21 days before he died.

== Summary ==
- 1-20 Unbelievers and hypocrites reproved
- 21-38 Exhortation to the worship of the true God
- 39-101 Jews and Christians urged to accept the claim of Muhammad to be a prophet of God
- 102-112 The opposition of Jews and Christians to Muhammad's prophecy combated
- 113-114 The doctrine of abrogation enunciated
- 115 A Qibla declared to be redundant
- 116-141 Judaism is denounced and the religion of Abraham declared to be the true Islam
- 142-153 The adoption of Mecca as the Qibla of Islam rather than the initial Qibla at Al-Aqsa mosque
- 154-163 The Bereaved friends of those slain at the Battle of Badr comforted
- 164-172 Makkans exhorted to faith in God, and directed to observe the law respecting forbidden meats
- 173-176 Law concerning lawful and unlawful food (delivered at Madina)
- 177 The sum of Muslim duty
- 178-179 The law of retaliation
- 180-182 The law concerning bequests
- 183-185 The law concerning fasting
- 186-187 The fast of Ramadan
- 188-202 The Hajj and war for the faith
- 203-206 Hypocrites and true believers contrasted
- 207-208 Exhortation to a hearty acceptance of Islam
- 209-212 Challenges and condemnation towards the disbelievers.
- 213 History of humanity's religion.
- 214-242 Sundry laws relating to alms giving, war, wine, orphans, etc.
- 243-254 The duty of warring in defence of religion enjoined by precept, and illustrated by the history of former prophets
- 255 The Throne Verse
- 256-257 Lā ikrāhā fid deen - Do not force anyone to become Muslim, for Islam is plain and clear, and its proofs and evidence are plain and clear. Therefore, there is no need to force anyone to embrace Islam.
- 258-260 The doctrine of the resurrection illustrated with allusions to Nimrod against Abraham and Parable of the Hamlet in Ruins
- 261-274 Exhortation and encouragement to alms giving
- 275-277 Usury forbidden
- 278-283 Debts in Islam including the longest verse in the Quran
- 284-286 Khawatim Al-Baqarah holding immense spiritual, protective, and theological significance in Islam, one of the most comprehensive and powerful Du'as (supplications) in the Quran. ----

== Theme and subject matter ==
=== 1-7 God-fearing rewarded, Unbelievers reproved ===
Following the muqatta'at, Al-Baqara begins with the declaration that the Quran is free of doubt and contains guidance for those who possess taqwa. Taqwā is grammatically linked to the triliteral root w-q-y evoking wariness, a sense of care and protection. These people, known as God-fearing (muttaqin), are defined as those who believe in al-ghaib (Unseen, ghayb, lit. “absent”), offer salah, spend zakat from what is provided to them, believe in Muhammad's prophethood and that of the other prophets, and the books revealed to them.

There follows a description of the kafirs and munafiqs. The first of these verses uses the word kafir to describe one who conceals the truth, and Muhammad is advised that they will not believe despite his efforts because God has sealed their hearts and hearing, and covered their eyes (so that they will not be able to see, hear, or comprehend guidance), and that they will be punished with a great torment. Next is a detailed description of munafiqs, defined here as those who say they believe in God and the Last Judgment, but do not actually believe in them. It is said that they try to deceive God and the mumins (believers) but they deceive themselves without perception, that in their hearts is a disease which God increases, and that they will be punished with a painful torment. The munafiqs are also said to spread fasad (disorder/mischief) in the land, while claiming to spread peace, and to call the believers fools. To the believers they say they believe, but when they go back to their devils, they tell confess their disbelief, but they do not know that God deceives them and increases their deviation. They are then called those who engage in a profitless trade, the purchase of error with guidance. The munafiqs are then likened to a person who starts a fire and feels safe in its immediate surrounding, but God extinguishes the fire and the person is covered in darkness. The Quran then calls them deaf, dumb, and blind. Another example given is that of a person wandering in rain, thunder and lightning in darkness, such that they would have to thrust their fingers into their ears out of the fear of death. The lightning is so bright that it almost takes away their sight, but they walk toward it whenever it strikes, and stay put when it is dark.

Mankind is then asked to worship God to acquire taqwa, and a description of God's creations follows: the earth as a resting place, the sky as a canopy, and rain sent from the sky to bring forth fruit and provision. They are then advised to not set up others in worship beside God. Those who doubt that the Quran was revealed to Muhammad are then challenged to produce a surah similar to it. It is then said that they will never be able to fulfill this challenge and are asked to fear Hell, which is described as being fueled with men and stones and specifically prepared for the kafirs.

The stories in this chapter are told to help the reader understand the theological conception of truth in Islam.

=== 8-20 The hypocrites ===
Q2:8-20 in Surah Al Baqarah refer to the hypocrites (Munafiqun). In the Meccan phase of Muhammad, there existed two groups, the Believers and the Mushrikeen (non-believers). However, after Hijrah (Emigration to Medina) Muhammad had to deal with the opposition of those who openly accepted Islam while secretly plotting against Muslims. Their leader was Abd-Allah ibn Ubayy who was about to be crowned king before the arrival of Muhammad in Medina. The hypocrites benefitted from the Muslims while not losing their association with the disbelievers. They were considered disloyal to both parties and inclined towards those who benefited them the most in the worldly sense

The surah also sheds light on the concept of Nifaq, which is opposite of sincerity. It is of two types:

1) Nifaq in belief: outwardly showing belief however in reality there is no belief

2) Nifaq in practice: where people believe however they act like hypocrites. The signs of a hypocrite are lying, breaking promises, not keeping an amaanah or trust and when they argue they curse or use bad language.

According to a prominent scholar, Kamaluddin Ahmed, Nifaq is something that is within the heart, hence no one knows of its existence except God. Therefore, no one can be called a hypocrite or Munaafiq through one's own self-assessment. This would amount to making Takfeer i.e. calling someone a Kafir (non-believer) since Nifaq (hypocrisy) in belief is kufr.

26 Commences with ۞ (rubʿ al-ḥizb), an Islamic symbol.

87-105 is preserved in the Ṣan‘ā’1 lower text.

Indeed, We gave Moses the Book and sent after him successive messengers. And We gave Jesus, son of Mary, clear proofs and supported him with the holy spirit. Why is it that every time a messenger comes to you ˹Israelites˺ with something you do not like, you become arrogant, rejecting some and killing others?(2:87)

Condemnation of alcoholic beverages and gambling is also first found in the chapter, and it is one of only four chapters in the Quran to refer to Christians as Nazarenes instead of the more frequent terms People of the Book or "Helpers of Christ."

Al-Baqarah contains several verses dealing with the subject of warfare. Q2:190-194 are quoted on the nature of battle in Islam.

The surah includes a few Islamic rules related to varying subjects, such as: prayers, fasting, striving on the path of God, the pilgrimage to Mecca, the change of the direction of prayer (Qiblah) from Jerusalem to Mecca, marriage and divorce, commerce, debt, and a great many of the ordinances concerning interest or usury.

=== 255 "The Throne Verse" ===
Quran 2 includes many verses which have virtues like the special Verse of the Throne (Aayatul Kursi). Muhammad is reported to have said,

"Do not turn your houses into graves. Verily, Satan does not enter the house where Surat Al-Baqarah is recited." [Muslim, Tirmidhi, Musnad Ahmed]

Ad-Darimi also recorded that Ash-Sha'bi said that 'Abdullah bin Mas'ud said, "Whoever recites ten Ayat from Surat Al-Baqarah in a night, then Satan will not enter his house that night. (These ten Ayat are) four from the beginning, Ayat Al-Kursi (2:255), the following two Ayat (2:256-257) and the last three Ayat."

Verse 255 is "The Throne Verse" (آية الكرسي ʾāyatu-l-kursī). It is the most famous verse of the Quran and is widely memorized and displayed in the Islamic world due to its emphatic description of God's omnipotence in Islam.

=== 256 No compulsion in religion ===
Verse 256 is one of the most quoted verses in the Quran. It famously notes that "There is no compulsion in religion".

=== 282 "Verse of Loan and Women's testimony" ===
Verse 2:282 covers two specific Islamic jurisprudence issues: (1) undertaking a loan and (2) the status of women's testimony.

Amin Ahsan Islahi in his Tafsir of Surah al-Baqarah says when there is a loan transaction for a specific period of time, it must be formally written down. Both the lender and the debtor must trust the writer. There must be two witnesses: two men, or one man and two women. The security of the writer must be guaranteed. The length of the contract should be stated exactly.

al-Jalalayn says, "summon to bear witness the debt two witnesses men mature Muslim free men; or if the two witnesses be not men then one man and two women".

== Structure ==
The structure represents a chiastic organization commonly found in the Quran. A chiastic structure, or ring composition, arranges themes or ideas in a mirrored sequence (e.g., A-B-C-D-C’-B’-A’) to emphasize central points and highlight relationships between corresponding elements.

== Abraham (Ibrahim) ==
Verses 116-141 tell the story of Abraham and his relationship with Mecca and his son. Abraham prayed to Allah that Mecca would be safe and prosperous for its people until the end of time (2:126). The next verses talk about how Abraham and Ishmael built the Kaaba and their prayer that their offspring would be righteous Muslims and Allah would send to them prophets so to guide them (2:127-130). This chapter also reaffirms that Abraham was neither a Christian, Jew, nor polytheist, but rather a monotheist, who submitted to Allah (2:131-136).

Later verses discuss the story of Abraham with Nimrod who refused to believe and claimed himself to be God. Abraham tells him the parable that Allah can bring the dead to life and let those alive be dead, and Nimrod responds by claiming he can do the same by killing someone. Abraham then tells the parable of how Allah raises the Sun from the East and challenged him to raise it from the West at which he was silenced.

The final discussion of Abraham in this chapter, is when he asks God to show him how he raises the dead (2:260).

== Musa (Moses) ==
Musa is the most mentioned individual in Quran:

- Appraisals of Moses: 2:136
- The prophet whom God spoke to: 2:253
- The Torah: 2:41-44; 2:53; 2:87
- Moses' miracle: 2:56, 2:60, 2:92, 2:211
- Moses and the Pharaoh
  - Moses and his followers were safe: 2:50
  - Pharaoh's and his army: 2:50
  - The Pharaoh punished the Israelites: 2:49
- Travel to the Promised Land
  - The Israelites entered the Promised Land: 2:58
  - Moses' dialogue with God: 2:51
  - The Israelites worshipped the calf: 2:51-54, 2:92-93
- Refusal of the Israelites: 2:246-249
- Attributes of the Israelites: 2:41-44; 2:55-59; 2:61-71; 2:74-76; 2:83; 2:93-6; 2:100-101; 2:104; 2:108; 2:140-142; 2:246-249

== See also ==
- Ayatul Kursi
- Al-Baqara 256
- Verse of Loan
