= Karl Ferdinand Amenda =

Karl Fedrinand Amenda (4 October 1771 – 8 March 1836) was a Baltic German music teacher and pastor. He was a close friend of Ludwig van Beethoven and taught music to the children of Wolfgang Amadeus Mozart.

Amenda was born in present-day Turlava, formerly known as Lipaiķi (German: Lippaiken), in western Courland, in what is now Latvia. He was educated at Jelgava Gymnasium in Jelgava from 1787 to 1792, where he studied music under Franz Adam Veichtner. From 1792 to 1795, he studied theology at the University of Jena while continuing his musical studies.

Between 1789 and 1799, Amanda spent time in Vienna, where he worked for Prince Joseph Franz Maximilian Lobkowitz. During this period, he taught music to the children of Wolfgang Amadeus Mozart and, through Lobkowitz, met Ludwig van Beethoven, with whom he formed a lifelong friendship. In 1799 he returned to his native region, and in 1802 became a pastor in Talsi, where he died in 1836.
