= Bauska (floorball club) =

Latvian floorball club

- League: Latvian Floorball League
- Location: Bauska, Latvia
- Home ground: Bauskas sporta nams
- Colors: White, Green, Red
- Head coach: Dainis Akmentiņš
- Parent group: Bucefals

Bauska, previously Uzvara lauks, is a Latvian Floorball League team based in Bauska, Latvia.

== Goaltenders ==
- 1 (Latvia) Elvis Holsts
- 29 (Latvia) Uģis Upenieks

== Defencemen ==
- 8 (Latvia) Pēteris Maziks
- 14 (Latvia) Andis Levītis
- 21 (Latvia) Māris Lasmanis
- 77 (Latvia) Toms Grunckis
- 89 (Latvia) Ģirts Laugalis

== Forwards ==
- 9 (Latvia) Rihards Mallons
- 15 (Latvia) Ingus Panteļējevs
- 17 (Latvia) Edgars Brakše
- 22 (Latvia) Edgars Lujāns
- 23 (Latvia) Raitis Cimermanis
- 27 (Latvia) Gvido Zuika
- 28 (Latvia) Māris Akmentiņš
- 69 (Latvia) Jānis Akmentiņš
- 76 (Latvia) Gatis Feldmanis
- 91 (Latvia) Pēteris Zeltiņš
- 99 (Latvia) Elvijs Artamovičs
