= 2000–01 Men's EuroFloorball Cup Finals =

European floorball club tournament

2000–01 Men's European Cup
Finals

Tournament details
- Host country: Sweden
- Venue: 1 (in 1 host city)
- Dates: 4–8 January 2001
- Teams: 8 (from 7 countries)

Final positions
- Champions: (Finland) Helsingfors IFK (1st title)
- Runners-up: (Sweden) Haninge IBK
- Third place: (Sweden) Warberg IC
- Fourth place: (Switzerland) UHC Rot-Weiss Chur

Tournament statistics
- Matches played: 18
- Goals scored: 141 (7.83 per match)

The 2000–01 Men's EuroFloorball Cup Finals was an international floorball tournament held in Gothenburg, Sweden, from 4 to 8 January 2001. Eight teams from seven countries competed; Helsingfors IFK won the EuroFloorball Cup after defeating Haninge IBK 2–0 in the final.

The tournament was originally called the Men's European Cup; the competition was renamed the EuroFloorball Cup in 2007–08.

== Championship results ==
=== Preliminary round ===
==== Conference A ====
Pos	Team	Pld	W	D	L	GF	GA	GD	Pts
1	(Switzerland) UHC Rot-Weiss Chur	3	2	1	0	23	9	+14	5
2	(Sweden) Warberg IC	3	2	0	1	20	6	+14	4
3	(Norway) Greåker IBK	3	1	1	1	12	8	+4	3
4	(Germany) UH Löwen Leipzig	3	0	0	3	4	36	−32	0

4 January 2001

(Germany) UH Löwen Leipzig	0–13	(Sweden) Warberg IC

Gothenburg, Sweden

(Norway) Greåker IBK	3–3	(Switzerland) UHC Rot-Weiss Chur

Gothenburg, Sweden

5 January 2001

(Sweden) Warberg IC	3–1	(Norway) Greåker IBK

Gothenburg, Sweden

(Switzerland) UHC Rot-Weiss Chur	15–2	(Germany) UH Löwen Leipzig

Gothenburg, Sweden

6 January 2001

(Sweden) Warberg IC	4–5	(Switzerland) UHC Rot-Weiss Chur

Gothenburg, Sweden

(Norway) Greåker IBK	8–2	(Germany) UH Löwen Leipzig

Gothenburg, Sweden

==== Conference B ====
Pos	Team	Pld	W	D	L	GF	GA	GD	Pts
1	(Sweden) Haninge IBK	3	3	0	0	21	1	+20	6
2	(Finland) Helsingfors IFK	3	2	0	1	15	5	+10	4
3	(Denmark) Herlev FC	3	1	0	2	8	12	−4	2
4	(Poland) KS Szarotka	3	0	0	3	1	26	−25	0

4 January 2001

(Poland) KS Szarotka	0–11	(Sweden) Haninge IBK

Gothenburg, Sweden

(Denmark) Herlev FC	1–5	(Finland) Helsingfors IFK

Gothenburg, Sweden

5 January 2001

(Sweden) Haninge IBK	6–1	(Denmark) Herlev FC

Gothenburg, Sweden

(Finland) Helsingfors IFK	9–0	(Poland) KS Szarotka

Gothenburg, Sweden

6 January 2001

(Sweden) Haninge IBK	4–1	(Finland) Helsingfors IFK

Gothenburg, Sweden

(Denmark) Herlev FC	6–1	(Poland) KS Szarotka

Gothenburg, Sweden

=== Playoffs ===
Semifinals
A1	(Switzerland) UHC Rot-Weiss Chur	1
B2	(Finland) Helsingfors IFK	2
B1	(Sweden) Haninge IBK	5
A2	(Sweden) Warberg IC	4

Finals
A1	(Finland) Helsingfors IFK	2
B1	(Sweden) Haninge IBK	0

==== Semi-finals ====
7 January 2001

(Switzerland) UHC Rot-Weiss Chur	1–2	(Finland) Helsingfors IFK

Gothenburg, Sweden

(Sweden) Haninge IBK	5–4	(Sweden) Warberg IC

Gothenburg, Sweden

==== Bronze-medal match ====
8 January 2001

(Switzerland) UHC Rot-Weiss Chur	5–6	(Sweden) Warberg IC

Gothenburg, Sweden

==== Championship Match ====
8 January 2001

(Finland) Helsingfors IFK	2–0	(Sweden) Haninge IBK

Gothenburg, Sweden

=== Placement round ===
==== 7th-place match ====
7 January 2001

(Poland) KS Szarotka	2–4	(Germany) UH Löwen Leipzig

Gothenburg, Sweden

==== 5th-place match ====
7 January 2001

(Norway) Greåker IBK	6–0	(Denmark) Herlev FC

Gothenburg, Sweden

=== Standings ===
Rk.	Team
1st place, gold medalist(s)	(Finland) Helsingfors IFK
2nd place, silver medalist(s)	(Sweden) Haninge IBK
3rd place, bronze medalist(s)	(Sweden) Warberg IC
4.	(Switzerland) UHC Rot-Weiss Chur
5.	(Norway) Greåker IBK
6.	(Denmark) Herlev FC
7.	(Germany) UH Löwen Leipzig
8.	(Poland) KS Szarotka

== See also ==
- 2000–01 Men's EuroFloorball Cup qualifying

Preceded by EuroFloorball Cup; 1999	Current: EuroFloorball Cup; 2000–01	Succeeded by EuroFloorball Cup; 2001–02
