= Al-Baqarah 256 =

Quranic verse saying there is no compulsion in religion

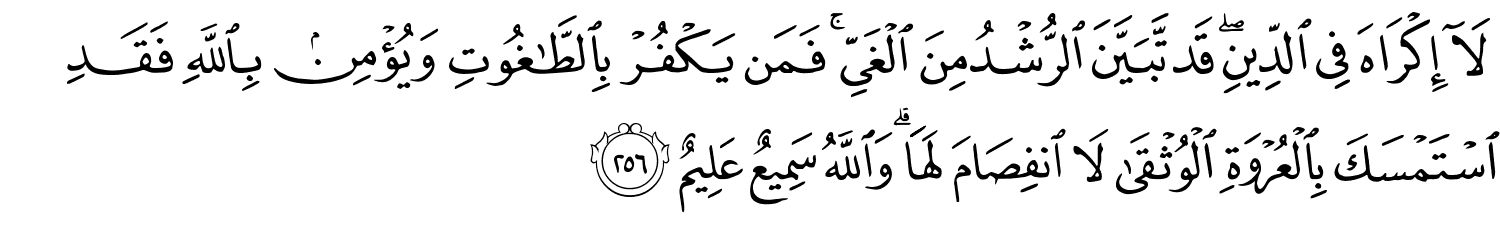

Recitation by Abdul Rahman Al-Sudais

The 256th verse (ayah) of Al-Baqara, in the Quran, includes the phrase that "there is no compulsion in religion". The Quran says that, since the revelation has clearly distinguished righteousness from unrighteousness, the people must choose which to follow. This verse immediately follows The Verse of the Throne.

The overwhelming majority of Muslim scholars (Note: including Ibn Taymiyya, Ibn Qayyim, Al-Tabari, Abi ʿUbayd, Al-Jaṣṣās, Makki bin Abi Talib, Al-Nahhas, Ibn Jizziy, Al-Suyuti, Ibn Ashur, Mustafa Zayd, Abdul-Rahman al-Sa'di and many others.) consider the verse to be a Medinan surah, when Muslims lived in their period of political ascendance, and to be non-abrogated. The Quranic proclamation that 'There is no compulsion in religion.' is considered to be an absolute and universal by Muslim scholars. So, under no condition, should an individual be forced to accept a religion or belief against their will.

The principle of non-compulsion in religion was not limited to freedom of religion, Islam also provided non-Muslims with considerable economic, cultural, and administrative rights.

== Text and meaning ==
=== Text and transliteration ===
- Hafs from Aasim ibn Abi al-Najud

لَآ إِكْرَاهَ فِى ٱلدِّينِ ^{صلے} قَد تَّبَيَّنَ ٱلرُّشْدُ مِنَ ٱلْغَىِّ ^{ج} فَمَن يَكْفُرْ بِٱلطَّٰغُوتِ وَيُؤْمِنۢ بِٱللَّهِ فَقَدِ ٱسْتَمْسَكَ بِٱلْعُرْوَةِ ٱلْوُثْقَىٰ لَا ٱنفِصَامَ لَهَا ^{قلے} وَٱللَّهُ سَمِيعٌ عَلِيمٌ ۝٢٥٦
^{256} Lā ’ikrāha fi d-dīn(i), qa t-tabay-yana r-rushdu mina l-ghay(yi), faman y-yakfur biṭ-ṭāghūti wayu’mim bil-lāhi faqadi s-tamsaka bil‘urwati l-wuthqā la n-fiṣāma lahā, wal-lāhu samī‘un ‘alīm(un)

- Warsh from Nafiʽ al-Madani

لَآ إِكۡرَاهَ فِے اِ۬لدِّينِ ^{صلے} قَد تَّبَيَّنَ اَ۬لرُّشۡدُ مِنَ اَ۬لۡغَىِّ ^{ج} فَمَن يَكۡفُرۡ بِالطَّٰغُوتِ وَيُومِنۢ بِاللَّهِ فَقَدِ اِٜسۡتَمۡسَكَ بِالۡعُرۡوَةِ اِ۬لۡوُثۡقَٜىٰ لَا اَٜنفِصَامَ لَهَا ^{قلے} وَاَ۬للَّهُ سَمِيعٌ عَلِيمٌ ۝٢٥٥
^{255} Lā ’ikrāha fi d-dīn(i), qa t-tabay-yana r-rushdu mina l-ghay(yi), faman y-yakfur biṭ-ṭāghūti wayūmim bil-lāhi faqadi s-tamsaka bil‘urwati l-wuthqā la n-fiṣāma lahā, wal-lāhu samī‘un ‘alīm(un)

=== Translation ===
^{256} Let there be no compulsion in religion, for the truth stands out clearly from falsehood. So whoever renounces false gods and believes in God has certainly grasped the firmest, unfailing hand-hold. And God is All-Hearing, All-Knowing.

Translation:Dr. Mustafa Khattab, the Clear Quran, 2015

^{256} Let there be no compulsion in religion: Truth stands out clear from Error: whoever rejects evil and believes in Allah hath grasped the most trustworthy hand-hold, that never breaks. And Allah heareth and knoweth all things.

Translation:Yusuf Ali, 1934

^{256} There shall be no compulsion in [acceptance of] the religion. The right course has become clear from the wrong. So whoever disbelieves in Taghut and believes in Allāh has grasped the most trustworthy handhold with no break in it. And Allāh is Hearing and Knowing.

Translation:Saheeh International, 1997

== Context ==
According to some commentators, this verse (Quran 2:256) was directed towards a small group of residents of Medina and is related to an incident during the time of the Prophet. The incident involved a Muslim boy who had been educated in a Jewish school in Medina and decided to depart with a Jewish tribe that was being expelled from the city. When the boy's distraught parents asked the Prophet if they could compel their son to stay, he told them that there is no compulsion in religion, as stated in the verse.

Narrated Abdullah ibn Abbas: When the children of a woman (in pre-Islamic days) did not survive, she took a vow on herself that if her child survives, she would convert it a Jew. When Banu an-Nadir were expelled (from Arabia), there were some children of the Ansar (Helpers) among them. They said: We shall not leave our children. So Allah the Exalted revealed; "Let there be no compulsion in religion. Truth stands out clear from error."

— Sunan Abi Dawud 2682

It is reported that Mujahid said that "This verse was revealed about a man of the Helpers who had a black boy called Subayh whom he used to coerce to become Muslim".

In all cases, following the famous maxim "العبرة بعموم اللفظ لا بخصوص السبب" (Consideration is granted to the Generality of the Language, not to the Specificity of the Reason [for Revelation]) it is concluded that the verse is general in meaning, and thus the verse has been understood over the centuries as a general command that people cannot be forced to convert to Islam.

== Discussion ==
=== Relevance to apostasy ===
First, the "no compulsion" phrase should not be used out of context and all exegesis of Quran that is "linear-atomistic" analysis of one small phrase in one verse is flawed. The complete verse and nearby verses should be read to understand the "complex hermeneutic totality" of context for anything in Quran.

It is reported that Mujahid said that "This verse was revealed about a man of the Helpers [Ansar of Medina] who had a black boy called Subayh whom he used to coerce to become Muslim". In addition scholar argue, no single phrase or verse in Quran is less or more relevant in Islam than other phrases or verses in Quran; and other verses in Quran such as verse 66 of At-Tawba state "Make no excuses! You have lost faith after your belief. If We pardon a group of you, We will punish others for their wickedness.", As well as "And say, ˹O Prophet,˺ “˹This is˺ the truth from your Lord. Whoever wills let them believe, and whoever wills let them disbelieve.” ...", "Had your Lord so willed ˹O Prophet˺, all ˹people˺ on earth would have certainly believed, every single one of them! Would you then force people to become believers?", "So, ˹continue to˺ remind ˹all, O Prophet˺, for your duty is only to remind. You are not ˹there˺ to compel them ˹to believe˺", "He said, “O my people! Consider if I stand on a clear proof from my Lord and He has blessed me with a mercy from Himself, one which you fail to see. Should we ˹then˺ force it on you against your will?". According to some western scholars, in the history of Islamic exegesis scholarship, that verse is considered as an early revelation, and abrogated by verses that were revealed to Muhammad at a later stage in his life. However, as stated by the famous British orientalist Sir Thomas Walker Arnold the verse in question is a Medinan verse, when Muslims lived in their period of political ascendance. Moreover, Muslim scholars have established the abrogated verses and 2:256 isn't among them. Finally, to understand the Quran, the sayings and actions of Muhammad as recorded in Hadith collections are considered by Islamic scholars.

=== Ibn Kathir's interpretation ===
The Quran commentator (Muffasir) Ibn Kathir, a Sunni, suggests that the verse implies that Muslims should not force anyone to convert to Islam since the truth of Islam is so self-evident that no one is in need of being coerced into it,

لاَ إِكْرَاهَ فِي الدِّينِ (There is no compulsion in religion), meaning, "Do not force anyone to become Muslim, for Islam is plain and clear, and its proofs and evidence are plain and clear. Therefore, there is no need to force anyone to embrace Islam. Rather, whoever God directs to Islam, opens his heart for it and enlightens his mind, will embrace Islam with certainty. Whoever God blinds his heart and seals his hearing and sight, then he will not benefit from being forced to embrace Islam."
It was reported that; the Ansar were the reason behind revealing this Ayah, although its indication is general in meaning. Ibn Jarir recorded that Ibn Abbas said (that before Islam), "When (an Ansar) woman would not bear children who would live, she would vow that if she gives birth to a child who remains alive, she would raise him as a Jew. When Banu An-Nadir (the Jewish tribe) were evacuated (from Al-Madinah), some of the children of the Ansar were being raised among them, and the Ansar said, `We will not abandon our children.' God revealed, لاَ إِكْرَاهَ فِي الدِّينِ قَد تَّبَيَّنَ الرُّشْدُ مِنَ الْغَيِّ (There is no compulsion in religion. Verily, the right path has become distinct from the wrong path). Abu Dawud and An-Nasa'i also recorded this Hadith. As for the Hadith that Imam Ahmad recorded, in which Anas said that the Messenger of God said to a man, أَسْلِم "Embrace Islam. The man said, "I dislike it. The Prophet said, وَإِنْ كُنْتَ كَارِهًا "Even if you dislike it. First, this is an authentic Hadith, with only three narrators between Imam Ahmad and the Prophet. However, it is not relevant to the subject under discussion, for the Prophet did not force that man to become Muslim. The Prophet merely invited this man to become Muslim, and he replied that he does not find himself eager to become Muslim. The Prophet said to the man that even though he dislikes embracing Islam, he should still embrace it, `for God will grant you sincerity and true intent.'

=== Ibn Hazm's interpretation ===
Ibn Hazm interprets Al-Baqarah 256 in his book Al-Muhalla as follows
"So it is established that the verse [Al-Baqarah 256] is not taken upon its apparent meaning but rather it is concerning those whom Allah forbade us to compel, and they are the People of the Book specifically."

=== Kashani's interpretation ===
Kashani, a Sufi, interprets Q.2:256 as follows

{ لاَ إِكْرَاهَ فِي ٱلدِّينِ قَد تَّبَيَّنَ ٱلرُّشْدُ مِنَ ٱلْغَيِّ فَمَنْ يَكْفُرْ بِٱلطَّاغُوتِ وَيْؤْمِن بِٱللَّهِ فَقَدِ ٱسْتَمْسَكَ بِٱلْعُرْوَةِ ٱلْوُثْقَىٰ لاَ ٱنفِصَامَ لَهَا وَٱللَّهُ سَمِيعٌ عَلِيمٌ } There is no compulsion in religion, because in reality religion is the guidance that is acquired from the light of the heart that is a concomitant of the human primordial nature and that is required for the faith of certainty, as God, exalted be He, says: so set your purpose for religion as a ḥanīf, a nature given by God, upon which He originated mankind. There is no changing God's creation. That is the upright religion [Q. 30:30], and Islam, which is the exoteric aspect of religion, is built upon this [guidance] and is something in which compulsion can have no place. The proof that the esoteric and true aspect of religion is faith, just as its exoteric aspect and [outer] form is Islam, comes in what follows: Rectitude has become clear, that is, it is distinguished, from error, by means of clear proofs, for the one who possesses insight (baṣīra) and reason (ʿaql), as they say, 'The morning is bright for he who has eyes'; so whoever disbelieves in the false deity, that is, [in] what is other than God and denies its existence and its effect, and believes in God, a belief of witnessing and in truth, has laid hold of the most firm handle [that cannot be split], that is, he has held onto the Essential Unity whose ties and modes of operation are in of Itself, such that there is nothing firmer than It, since every thing that holds onto It is firmly attached, nay, every existence is existent through It and non-existent in itself. Thus if one were to consider such [a thing's] existence, then it is split (infiṣām) in itself because a contingent thing's attachment and existence is only through the Necessary [Existent]. When consideration [of this Existent] is severed from that [contingent] thing then that contingent's existence is terminated and is no longer anything in itself. This [Necessary Existent] cannot be split from the existence of His very essence since He does not entail divisibility (tajazzuÌ) or duality (ithnayniyya). There is a subtle detail in this [concept of] 'splitting' (infiṣām), which is that a splitting (infiṣām) is a breaking (inkisār) but without separation (infiṣāl). Since no contingent can be separated from His Essence, exalted be He, or remove itself from It - given that it would either be an act of His or an attribute of His - there can be absolutely no separation. Nay, if reason would consider such [a contingent] in isolation, it would appear split, that is lacking [independent] existence, its existence attached to His existence, exalted be He. And God is Hearing, hears the speech of those who have religion, Knowing, of their intentions and their faith.

== Verses relating to Quran 2:256 ==
A number of verses relate to Quran 2:256; these include:

Had your Lord so willed ˹O Prophet˺, all ˹people˺ on earth would have certainly believed, every single one of them! Would you then force people to become believers?

— Quran 10:99

He said, “O my people! Consider if I stand on a clear proof from my Lord and He has blessed me with a mercy from Himself, which you fail to see. Should we ˹then˺ force it on you against your will?

— Quran 11:28

And say, ˹O Prophet,˺ “˹This is˺ the truth from your Lord. Whoever wills let them believe, and whoever wills let them disbelieve.” Surely We have prepared for the wrongdoers a Fire whose walls will ˹completely˺ surround them. When they cry for aid, they will be aided with water like molten metal, which will burn ˹their˺ faces. What a horrible drink! And what a terrible place to rest!

— Quran 18:29

So, ˹continue to˺ remind ˹all, O Prophet˺, for your duty is only to remind. You are not ˹there˺ to compel them ˹to believe˺.

— Quran 88:21-22

These verses indicate that compulsion is strictly prohibited.

== See also ==
- Apostasy in Islam
- Religious pluralism
- Religious tolerance
