= Lekrings =

Latvian floorball club

- Founded: 1992
- Arena: Cēsu sporta nams
- Coach: Andris Malkavs
- League: Men's Highest Floorball League of Latvia
- Championships: Men's Highest Floorball League of Latvia (7 titles)

Lekrings is a Men's Highest Floorball League of Latvia team based in Cēsis, Latvia. Lekrings became champions of the first and the next two seasons of Latvian championships. Title was won again in 2008/09, 2012/13, 2013/14 and 2014/15 seasons.

== Current roster ==
- 1 (Latvia) Markuss Plūdums
- 6 (Latvia) Emīls Dzalbs
- 7 (Latvia) Bruno Beķeris
- 8 (Latvia) Toms Rīsmanis
- 10 (Latvia) Edgars Purinš
- 13 (Latvia) Jānis Melderis
- 15 (Latvia) Krišjānis Tiltiņš
- 17 (Latvia) Jorens Malkavs
- 23 (Latvia) Andris Rajeckis
- 27 (Latvia) Pauls Erenbots
- 29 (Latvia) Ričards Stivriņš
- 30 (Latvia) Kārlis Grintāls
- 34 (Latvia) Roberts Zande
- 37 (Latvia) Krišs Treimanis
- 41 (Latvia) Artūrs Jurševskis
- 47 (Latvia) Artūrs Lazdiņš
- 69 (Latvia) Miķelis Koknesis Roops
- 72 (Latvia) Olafs Zvīnis
- 81 (Latvia) Kaspars Lisovskis
- 89 (Latvia) Kristiānas Miezītis

== Transferred / Not Active Players ==
- 1 (Latvia) Guntis Bundzenieks
- 7 (Latvia) Mārtiņš Jarohovičs
- 9 (Latvia) Ivars Rancāns
- 14 (Latvia) Engus Bulmeisters
- 15 (Latvia) Jānis Freivalds
- 16 (Latvia) Jānis Platacis
- 17 (Latvia) Artis Malkavs
- 19 (Latvia) Jānis Belasovs
- 20 (Latvia) Kaspars Freibergs
- 21 (Latvia) Mārtiņš Druvkalns
- 22 (Latvia) Aigars Belasovs
- 23 (Latvia) Jānis Alps
- 96 (Latvia) Ervīns Apinis
