= 1999 Men's EuroFloorball Cup Finals =

1999 Men's European Cup
Finals

Tournament details
- Host country: Switzerland
- Venues: 3 (in 3 host cities)
- Dates: 27–31 December 1999
- Teams: 8 (from 7 countries)

Final positions
- Champions: (Sweden) Warberg IC (2nd title)
- Runners-up: (Sweden) Haninge IBK
- Third place: (Finland) Espoon Oilers
- Fourth place: (Czech Republic) Tatran Střešovice

Tournament statistics
- Matches played: 18
- Goals scored: 146 (8.11 per match)
- All statistics correct as of 03:51, August 22, 2008 (UTC).

The 1999 Men's EuroFloorball Cup Finals was the 7th edition of the premier competition for floorball clubs. It took place in Switzerland from December 27 to December 31, 1999. Warberg IC won the cup after defeating Haninge IBK 7-5.

The tournament was known as the 1999 Men's European Cup, but due to name implications, is now known as the 1999 Men's EuroFloorball Cup.

== Championship Results ==
=== Preliminary round ===
==== Conference A ====
| Pos | Team | Pld | W | D | L | GF | GA | GD | Pts |
|---|---|---|---|---|---|---|---|---|---|
| 1 | (Sweden) Warberg IC | 3 | 3 | 0 | 0 | 21 | 6 | +15 | 6 |
| 2 | (Czech Republic) Tatran Střešovice | 3 | 1 | 1 | 1 | 19 | 5 | +14 | 3 |
| 3 | (Switzerland) UHC Alligator Malans | 3 | 1 | 1 | 1 | 7 | 10 | −3 | 3 |
| 4 | (Denmark) Herlev FC | 3 | 0 | 0 | 3 | 4 | 14 | −10 | 0 |

December 27, 1999

| UHC Alligator Malans (Switzerland) | 3–1 | (Denmark) Herlev FC |

Switzerland

| Tatran Střešovice (Czech Republic) | 0–1 | (Sweden) Warberg IC |

Switzerland

December 28, 1999

| Herlev FC (Denmark) | 1–3 | (Czech Republic) Tatran Střešovice |

Switzerland

| Warberg IC (Sweden) | 7–2 | (Switzerland) UHC Alligator Malans |

Switzerland

December 29, 1999

| Herlev FC (Denmark) | 2–8 | (Sweden) Warberg IC |

Switzerland

| UHC Alligator Malans (Switzerland) | 2–2 | (Czech Republic) Tatran Střešovice |

Switzerland

==== Conference B ====
| Pos | Team | Pld | W | D | L | GF | GA | GD | Pts |
|---|---|---|---|---|---|---|---|---|---|
| 1 | (Sweden) Haninge IBK | 3 | 2 | 0 | 1 | 21 | 6 | +15 | 4 |
| 2 | (Finland) Espoon Oilers | 3 | 2 | 0 | 1 | 19 | 5 | +14 | 4 |
| 3 | (Norway) Tunet IBK | 3 | 2 | 0 | 1 | 11 | 10 | +1 | 4 |
| 4 | (Latvia) Hanzas Maiznica | 3 | 0 | 0 | 3 | 5 | 11 | −6 | 0 |

December 27, 1999

| Hanzas Maiznica (Latvia) | 1–13 | (Sweden) Haninge IBK |

Switzerland

| Tunet IBK (Norway) | 2–1 | (Finland) Espoon Oilers |

Switzerland

December 28, 1999

| Haninge IBK (Sweden) | 7–1 | (Norway) Tunet IBK |

Switzerland

| Espoon Oilers (Finland) | 14–2 | (Latvia) Hanzas Maiznica |

Switzerland

December 29, 1999

| Hanzas Maiznica (Latvia) | 2–8 | (Norway) Tunet IBK |

Switzerland

| Haninge IBK (Sweden) | 1–4 | (Finland) Espoon Oilers |

Switzerland

=== Playoffs ===
Semifinals
A1 | (Sweden) Warberg IC | 8
B2 | (Finland) Espoon Oilers | 4
B1 | (Sweden) Haninge IBK | 6
A2 | (Czech Republic) Tatran Střešovice | 0

Finals
A1 | (Sweden) Warberg IC | 7
B1 | (Sweden) Haninge IBK | 5

==== Semi-finals ====
December 30, 1999

| Warberg IC (Sweden) | 8–4 | (Finland) Espoon Oilers |

Switzerland

| Haninge IBK (Sweden) | 6–0 | (Czech Republic) Tatran Střešovice |

Switzerland

==== Bronze-medal match ====
December 31, 1999

| Espoon Oilers (Finland) | 8–2 | (Czech Republic) Tatran Střešovice |

Switzerland

==== Championship Match ====
December 31, 1999

| Warberg IC (Sweden) | 7–5 | (Sweden) Haninge IBK |

Switzerland

=== Placement round ===
==== 7th-place match ====
December 30, 1999

| Hanzas Maiznica (Latvia) | 3–4 | (Denmark) Herlev FC |

Switzerland

==== 5th-place match ====
December 30, 1999

| UHC Alligator Malans (Switzerland) | 2–5 | (Norway) Tunet IBK |

Switzerland

=== Standings ===
| Rk. | Team |
|---|---|
| 1st place, gold medalist(s) | (Sweden) Warberg IC |
| 2nd place, silver medalist(s) | (Sweden) Haninge IBK |
| 3rd place, bronze medalist(s) | (Finland) Espoon Oilers |
| 4. | (Czech Republic) Tatran Střešovice |
| 5. | (Norway) Tunet IBK |
| 6. | (Switzerland) UHC Alligator Malans |
| 7. | (Denmark) Herlev FC |
| 8. | (Latvia) Hanzas Maiznica |

== See also ==
- 1999 Men's EuroFloorball Cup qualifying

| Preceded by EuroFloorball Cup; 1998 | Current: EuroFloorball Cup; 1999 | Succeeded by EuroFloorball Cup; 2000–01 |
