= JSK Tähe Jõgeva =

Estonian floorball club

JSK Selver/Tähe Jõgeva
- Founded: 12.October 1995
- League: Estonian floorball league
- Location: Jõgeva, Estonia
- Home ground: Jōgeva Spordikeskus Virtus
- Colors: Yellow, Black
- Head coach: Marko Saksing
- Parent group: Jōgeva SK Tähe

JSK Selver/Tähe Jõgeva is an Estonian floorball league team based in Jõgeva, Estonia. The club has won Estonian Championship for 9 times and finished second for 7 times. Players of the club represent also Estonian National team. The club has also participated in the Latvian Floorball League. Former SK Tähe player Rein Kivi, plays for Finnish club Helsingi SSV.

== History ==
JSK Tähe was founded on 12 October 1995. For today, the club is famous in Estonia and in other countries. Thanks to club success over the country, SK Tähe membership has grown every year. For this season, the club has over 120 players of different ages. The club has a first team, which is taking part in Estonian premiership and Latvian floorball championships. The club has performed in the first league of Estonian Championship. JSK Tähe had a women's floorball team too and they were successful in the championship, but for now the women's team has fallen apart. The club has also training for younger boys and girls. Marko Saksing is the founder of the club and playing coach.

== Squad ==
=== Goaltenders ===
- 1 (Estonia) Tõnis Vähi
- 20 (Estonia) Rainer Kalde
- 92 (Estonia) Gerno Rebane

=== Defencemen ===
- 14 (Estonia) Lauri Hõim
- 16 (Estonia) Hannes Pagi (A)
- 22 (Estonia) Siim Selgis
- 24 (Estonia) Sander Kinks
- 27 (Estonia) Nikita Bõstrov (C)
- 32 (Estonia) Tanel Soidla
- 33 (Estonia) Toomas Peterson
- 38 (Estonia) Jüri Narits
- 88 (Estonia) Tammi Kivi

=== Forwards ===
- 2 (Estonia) Sven Uue
- 3 (Estonia) Kaspar Virkus
- 5 (Estonia) Sten Veskis
- 8 (Estonia) Nikolai Roop
- 10 (Estonia) Raul Kivi
- 11 (Estonia) Marko Saksing
- 12 (Estonia) Raido Moor
- 13 (Estonia) Siim Hõim
- 15 (Estonia) Kalmer Koossalu
- 19 (Estonia) Mario Paulus
- 21 (Estonia) Alari Pagi
- 23 (Estonia) Kaido Ingver
- 28 (Estonia) Ilmar Niitov
- 40 (Estonia) Rauno Vadi
- 52 (Estonia) Vaiko Vadi
- 58 (Russia) Valery Maslov (A)
- 69 (Estonia) Margus Guss
- 71 (Estonia) Vladimir Nurmi
- 79 (Russia) Pavel Semenov
- 87 (Estonia) Siim Sommer
