= FK Lielvārde =

Latvian floorball club

Lielvārde/Fatpipe
- Founded: 1998
- League: Latvian Floorball League
- Location: Lielvārde, Latvia
- Home ground: Lielvārdes sporta centrs
- Colors: Red, White
- Head coach: Kaspars Kreimanis

Lielvārde/Fatpipe is a Latvian Floorball League team based in Lielvārde, Latvia. For the first time the team became Latvian champions in the 2011/12 season. Title was won again in the 2015/16 and 2018/19 seasons. In 2022/2023 season the team won their 4th title. "Lielvārde/Fatpipe" are the current champions of the latvian floorball league.

== Goaltenders 2022/23 ==
- 89 (Latvia) Jānis Salcevičs
- 69 (Latvia) Lauris Kārkliņš
- 1 (Latvia) Raivis Puzulis

== Defencemen 2022/23 ==
- 4 (Latvia) Jānis Jāzeps Grizāns
- 15 (Latvia) Iļja Taratutins
- 20 (Latvia) Gustavs Rolands Ražinskis
- 21 (Latvia) Armands Savins
- 23 (Latvia) Kārlis Stukāns
- 71 (Latvia) Mariss Giņko
- 90 (Latvia) Klāvs Kaspars

== Forwards 2022/23 ==
- 2 (Latvia) Patriks Cinītis
- 5 (Latvia) Didzis Nemme
- 7 (Latvia) Niks Blumfelds
- 10 (Latvia) Aivis Kusiņš
- 11 (Latvia) Armands Skulte
- 12 (Latvia) Maikls Nazarovs
- 13 (Latvia) Sandis Mihailovskis
- 14 (Latvia) Markuss Nazarovs
- 16 (Latvia) Kārlis Rudzītis
- 17 (Latvia) Gustavs Rudzītis
- 22 (Latvia) Edgars Ričards Gremze
- 27 (Latvia) Juris Sandis Jēgers (Captain)
- 30 (Latvia) Ralfs Fricsons
- 33 (Latvia) Oskars Tūtāns
- 35 (Latvia) Toms Emīls Jēkabsons
- 93 (Latvia) Gustavs Gadzāns
