= Talsi (floorball club) =

Latvian floorball club

FK Talsi
- Full name: Talsu novada Sporta skola/Krauzers; Florbola klubs Talsi
- League: Latvian Floorball League
- Location: Talsi, Latvia
- Home ground: Talsu sporta zāle
- Colors: Black
- Head coach: Uldis Fīrmanis

Talsu NSS/Krauzers (previously FK Talsi) is a floorball team based in Talsi, Latvia. It currently plays in the Elvi Floorball League.

== Goaltenders ==
- 1 (Latvia) Andris Eglītis
- 12 (Latvia) Māris Ronis
- 41 (Latvia) Kārlis Švampe

== Defencemen ==
- 2 (Latvia) Oskars Fīrmanis
- 7 (Latvia) Rihards Fīrmanis
- 11 (Latvia) Mikus Norde
- 14 (Latvia) Jānis Klestrovs
- 16 (Latvia) Andris Blumbahs
- 14 (Latvia) Ivo Solomahins
- 78 (Latvia) Mārtiņš Maķevics
- 81 (Latvia) Dailis Skudritis
- 84 (Latvia) Andris Jurkevics
- 91 (Latvia) Madars Plepis

== Forwards ==
- 4 (Latvia) Roberts Fārenhorsts
- 8 (Latvia) Uvis Nordeja
- 9 (Latvia) Andis Švalkovskis
- 10 (Latvia) Māris Āboltiņš
- 13 (Latvia) Daneks Balodis
- 17 (Latvia) Aivars Haselbaums
- 18 (Latvia) Kristiāns Lisovskis
- 20 (Latvia) Ģirts Zanders
- 21 (Latvia) Artis Raitums
- 69 (Latvia) Māris Kumerdanks
