= Talsi =

Town and capital of Talsi Municipality, Latvia

Talsi Livonian: Tālsa
- Town
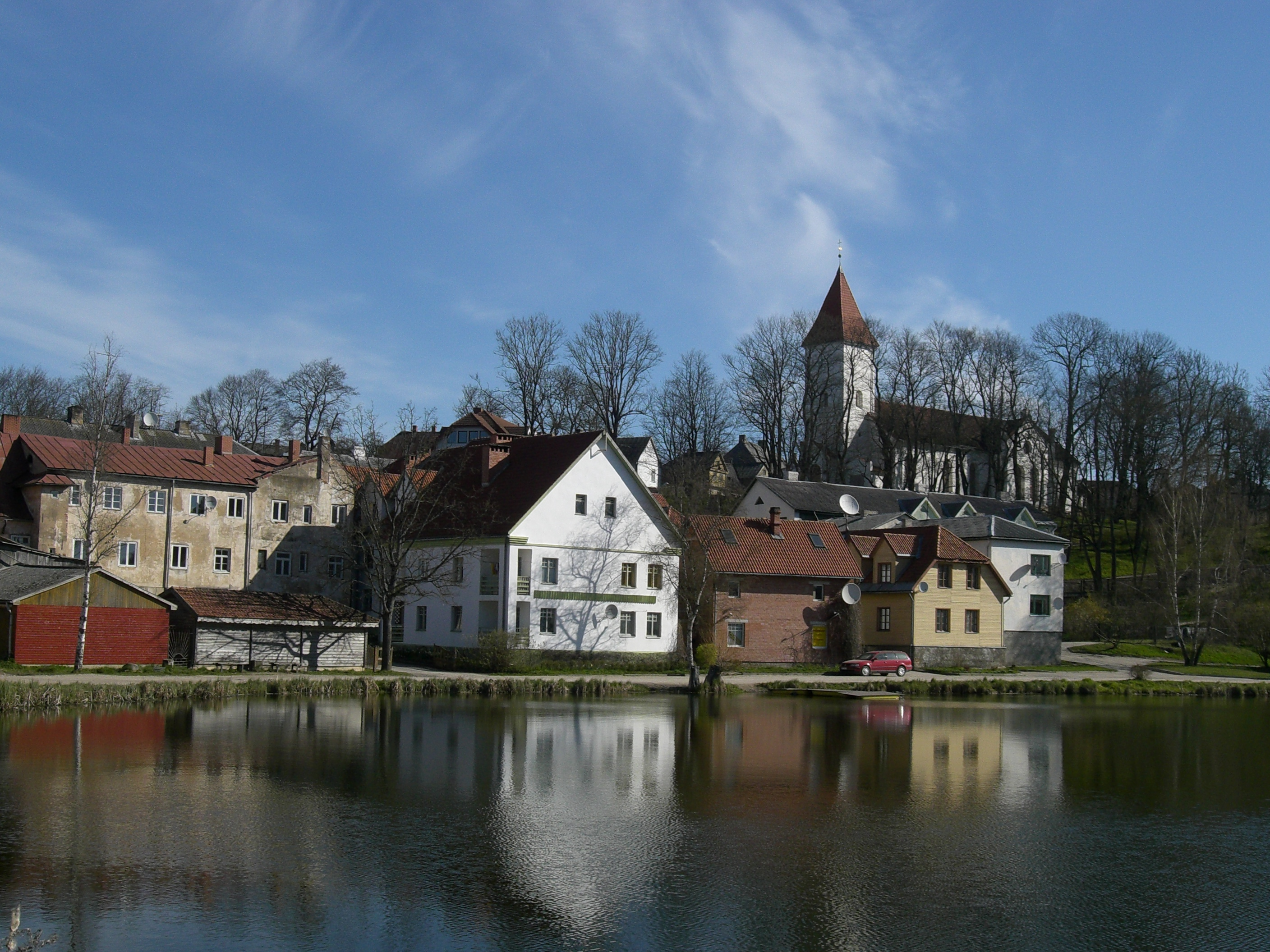
- Talsi

- Flag Coat of arms

- Location in Latvia
- Coordinates: 57°14′40″N 22°35′12″E
- Country: Latvia
- District: Talsi Municipality
- Town rights: 1917

Government
  - Mayor: Andis Āboliņš

Area
  - Total: 7.85 km^{2} (3.03 sq mi)
  - Land: 7.65 km^{2} (2.95 sq mi)
  - Water: 0.2 km^{2} (0.077 sq mi)

Population (2026)
  - Total: 8,637
  - Density: 1,130/km^{2} (2,920/sq mi)
- Time zone: UTC+2 (EET)
  - Summer (DST): UTC+3 (EEST)
- Postal code: LV-320(1–3)
- Calling code: +371 632
- Number of city council members: 19
- Website: www.talsunovads.lv

Talsi (Livonian: Tālsa, German: Talsen) (population 11,371) is a town in the Courland region of Latvia. It is the administrative centre of Talsi Municipality. It is nicknamed the "green pearl of Courland".

== Etymology ==
It is believed that the name is derived from an old Livonian word, talusse, meaning "secluded place".

== History ==
=== Early history ===
A hill fort has existed in Talsi at least since the 10th century, originally inhabited by Curonians. The settlement of Talsi is mentioned in written sources for the first time in 1231 during the Middle Ages, in a contract between the elders of a Curonian tribe and the papal envoy Baldwin von Alna. During the Northern Crusades, the settlement came under German over-lordship and a castle was built in Talsi during the late 13th century. The settlement grew in the 15th century, when traders and artisans from German-speaking lands settled in Talsi. The presently visible main church of the town was inaugurated in 1567; pastor Karl Ferdinand Amenda, a close friend of Ludwig van Beethoven, worked in the church for many years. During the reign of Duke Jacob Kettler, an iron smelting furnace was constructed in Talsi, an early industrial development. The town has suffered from the plague twice (1657 and 1710) and was devastated by a large fire in 1733. The town became part of the Russian Empire in 1795 together with the rest of Courland. At that time, Baltic Germans constituted about sixty percent of the population. At the end of the 18th century, Jews were allowed to settle in Talsi for the first time. Most of the Jews who settled in Talsi originally came from Lithuania and would with time come to form a substantial part of the town population. Eventually a synagogue was built in Talsi.

=== 19th century and World War I ===
An elementary school opened in 1863 and a private school in 1873 (the latter was for many years the workplace of linguist Kārlis Mīlenbahs); both schools initially taught only in German. In 1887 a Russian-language school was also opened in Talsi. During the Revolution of 1905, there was unrest in the town and several houses burned down and inhabitants killed. During World War I the town suffered heavily and its population decreased from around 5,000 to about 1,100. The entire Jewish population was expelled by Russian military authorities (but some would later return). Peace was not entirely restored until 1920, with the end of the Latvian War of Independence which made Talsi part of the newly proclaimed Latvian republic.

=== In independent Latvia and during the 20th century ===
The town grew rapidly again and in 1935 had 4116 inhabitants (82% ethnic Latvians, 12% Jews and 3% Germans). The town was under German occupation from 3 July 1941 right up until the end of World War II on 9 May 1945. The occupying German army used one of the buildings in Talsi as a place where they tortured prisoners; during the Soviet times a bas-relief was put up in commemoration of the victims on the wall of the house. During the Nazi occupation the town's entire Jewish population was murdered. The Germans were aided by ethnic Latvian collaborators. A single Jewish woman was hidden by a local farmer but discovered in 1944 and killed.

The 1950s and 60s were a time of relative prosperity. The town had a forceful leader in Kārlis Grīnbergs, chairman of Talsi Executive Committee (as the town now was part of the Latvian Soviet Socialist Republic under Soviet occupation). A metalworking plant was opened in 1965 that would attract many jobs to the town. Following the dissolution of the Soviet Union and the re-establishment of Latvia's independence, one of the main monuments of the town, a sculpture called Koklētājs and dedicated to the Latvian freedom fighters could finally be inaugurated. It was begun during the 1930s but could not be finished until after the fall of the Soviet Union.

== Geography ==
Talsi is characterised by its location by nine hills and two lakes. The hills are called Pilskalns, Ķēniņkalns, Leču kalns, Tiguļu kalns, Sauleskalns, Baznīckalns, Krievragkalns, Vilkmuižas kalns and Dzirnavkalns. Pilskalns, meaning "castle hill" is the location of the old hill fort. The hill is 32 metres (105 ft) high and lies at the centre of the town. An archaeological excavation of the hill fort was carried out here in 1936 – 1938. The highest hill in Talsi is Tiguļu kalns. This hill has an arboretum and is the location of Talsi Regional Museum, housed in a manor house originally built for a local aristocrat, Baron von Firck. OnLeču kalns there is a memorial sculpture in remembrance of the Revolution of 1905, when six revolutionaries where killed here. Talsi lake, in the middle of the town, is surrounded by a promenade and there is a fountain installed in the lake.

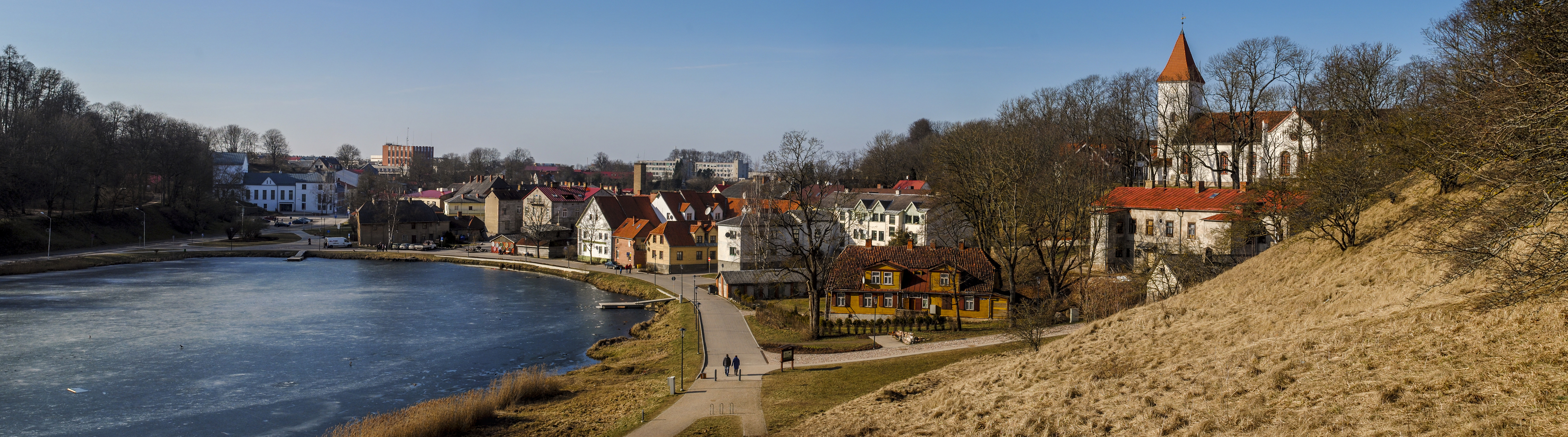
View of Talsi's town centre

== Culture and religion ==
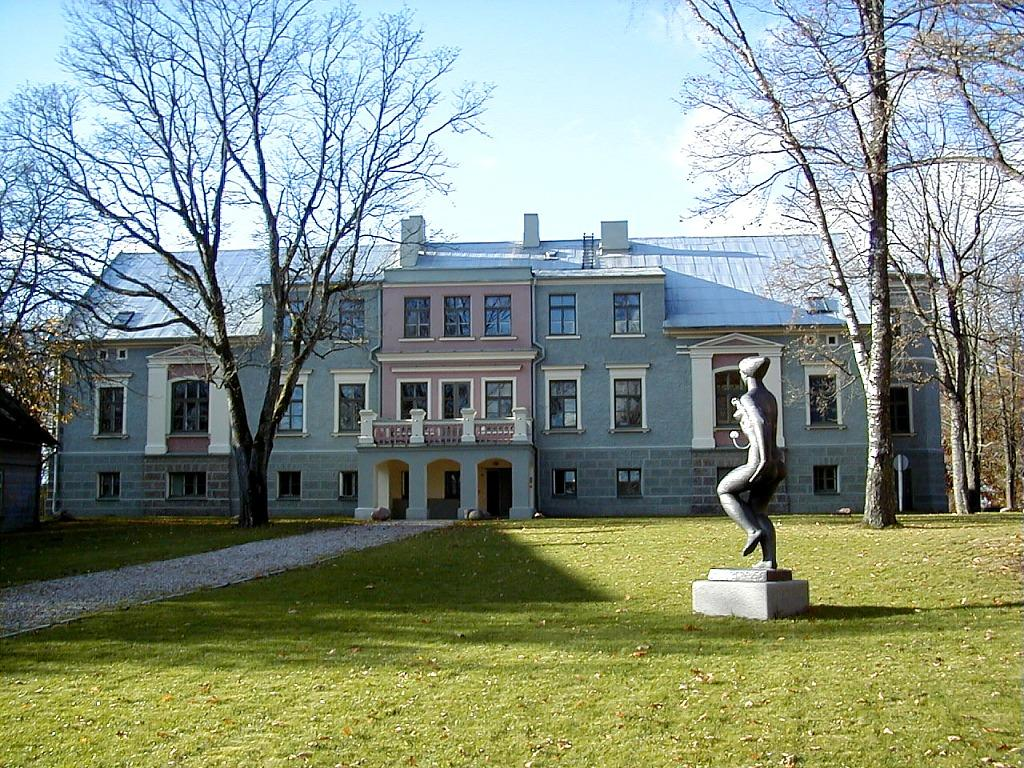
Talsi Regional Museum

As mentioned above, the town hosts a regional museum in the former manor house of Baron von Firck. There is also a cultural centre with a "creative yard" in the middle of the town. The town also has two libraries of which one is a children's library. There are churches of the Lutheran, Catholic, Baptist and Seventh-Day Adventist Christian faiths in Talsi. The former synagogue is today a private house. The Lutheran church, built in 1567 but reconstructed several times, is the oldest stone building in Talsi.

== Sport ==
Talsi has a municipal school of sport, and hosts an annual rally competition. In addition, there are numerous sports facilities in the town, e.g. skating, ice hockey and association football. The town is home to Latvian Elvi Floorball League club FK Talsi (also Talsu NSS/Krauzers), Latvian Third League Western Zone club FC Talsi and Latvian Regional League Championship member, volleyball club SK Talsi.

== Transportation and infrastructure ==
Talsi is connected to Riga via bus. A journey from Riga to Talsi takes approximately two hours. An airfield was built around 1 kilometre (0.62 miles) outside Talsi during Soviet times. It is used for small planes and occasionally for events.

== Notable people ==
- Karl Ferdinand Amenda (1777–1836), a Baltic German music teacher, composer and pastor; close friend of Ludwig van Beethoven
- Sara Braun (1862–1955), Chilean businesswoman and one of the principal employers in Patagonia.
- Arved von Schultz (1883–1967), geographer
- Frédéric Fiebig (1885–1953), painter, lived in France; Baltic German father
- Raimonds Tiguls (brons 1972), electronic musician, composer and producer.
- Ilze Indriksone (born 1974), politician, Minister of Economics, 2022 to 2023.
- Intars Busulis (born 1978), singer, trombonist and musician; participated in the Eurovision Song Contest 2009
- Krišjānis Zeļģis (born 1985), poet and brewer.
- Markus Riva (born 1986), singer
- Dzintars Čīča (born 1993), singer, participated in the Junior Eurovision Song Contest 2003

=== Sport ===
- Vera Zozulya (born 1956), luger, gold medallist at the 1980 Winter Olympics
- Guntis Osis (born 1962), bobsledder, team bronze medallist at the 1988 Winter Olympics
- Anita Liepiņa born 1967), athlete, race walker and long-distance runner
- Uvis Helmanis (born 1972), basketball player, now a basketball coach.
- Romāns Vainšteins (born 1973), road bicycle racer
- Māris Ziediņš (born 1978), ice hockey player
- Jānis Jansons (born 1982) a floorball player, who has played 21 games for Latvia
- Artūrs Strēlnieks (born 1985), basketball player
- Jānis Strēlnieks (born 1989), basketball player

== Events ==
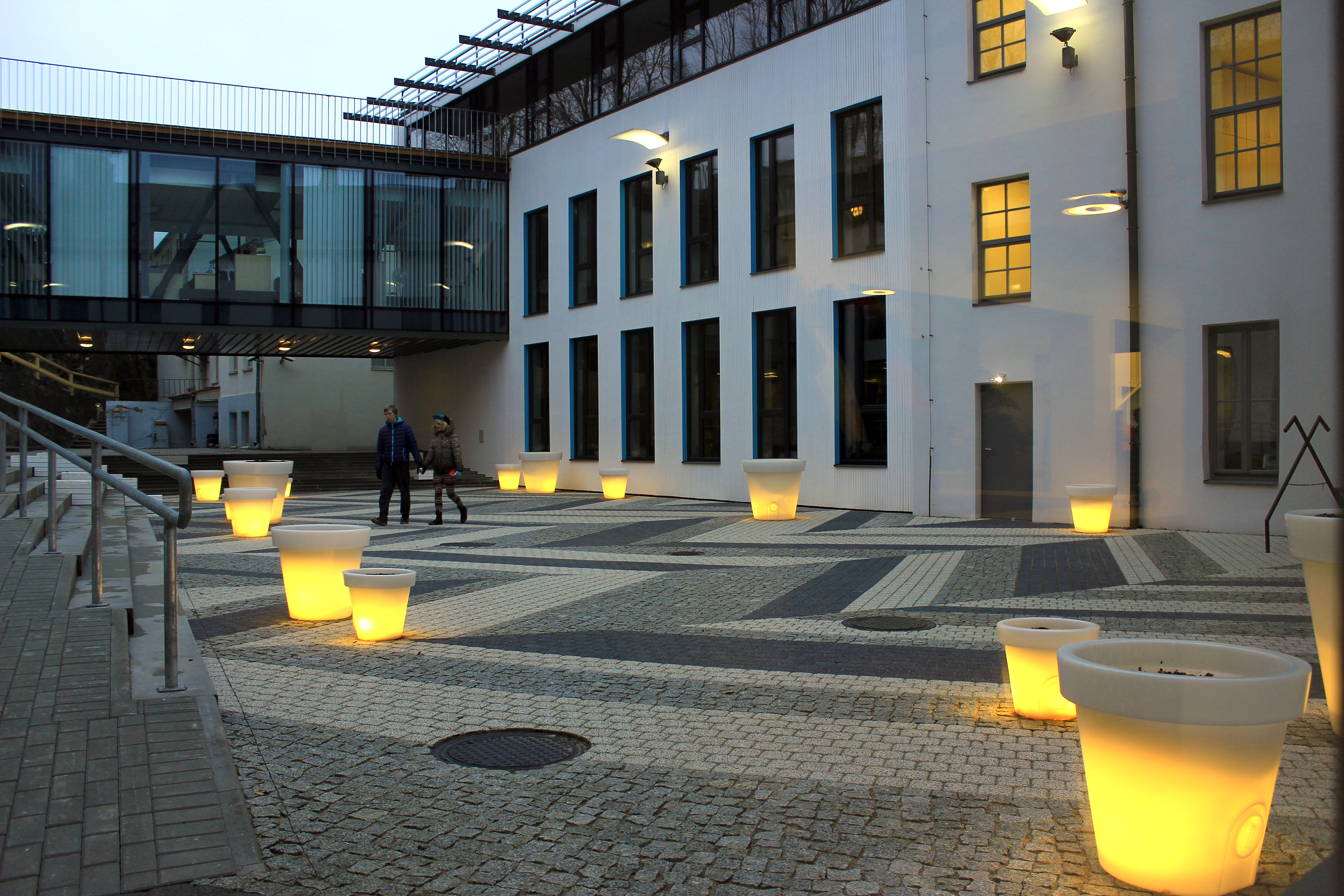
Talsi Culture Centre

A number of events are arranged annually in the town. The International Carl Ferdinand Amenda Music School Competition is a classical music competition arranged by the municipality and open for children aged 7–17 years. There is an annual "Talsi Celebration" every year in July, a market fair at the end of August and designated days of poetry and art. In addition, national holidays such as Independence Day (18 November) and Lāčplēsis Day are observed in the town.

== Twin towns ==
Talsi is twinned with:

- Alanya, Turkey
- Lejre, Denmark
- Orhei, Moldova
- Prienai, Lithuania
- Saaremaa, Estonia
- Shchyolkovo, Russia
- Söderköping, Sweden
- (Georgia (country)) Telavi, Georgia
- Chortkiv, Ukraine
