= Kursi, Harju County =

Village in Estonia

Coordinates: 59°26′16″N 25°30′47″E

Kursi
- Village
- Interactive map of Kursi
- Country: Estonia
- County: Harju County
- Parish: Kuusalu Parish
- Time zone: UTC+2 (EET)
  - Summer (DST): UTC+3 (EEST)

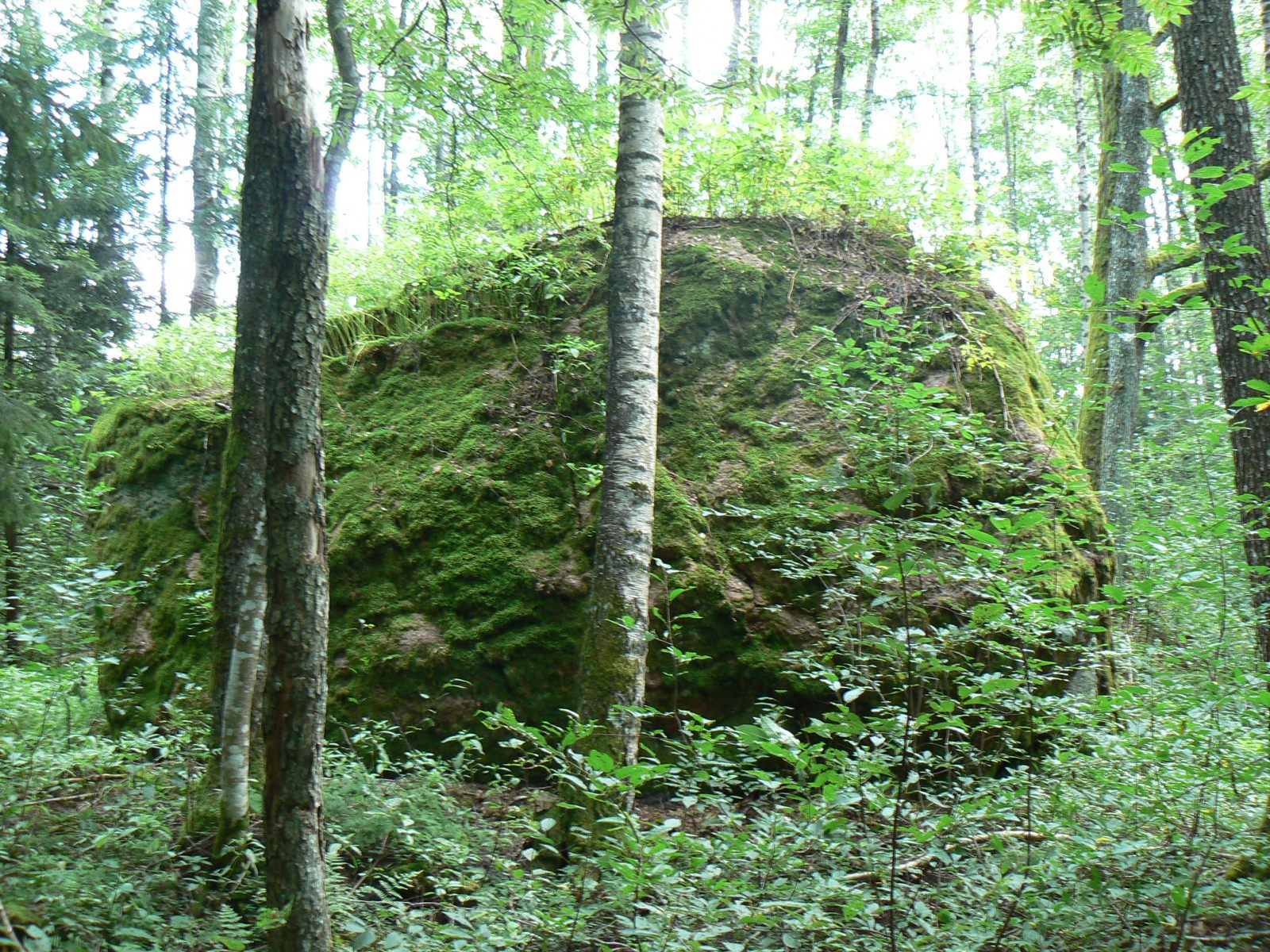

Kursi is a village in Kuusalu Parish, Harju County in northern Estonia.

== Population ==
Year	Residents
2000	45
2011	44
2021	52

== Climate ==
The area has a humid continental climate with maritime influences due to its relative proximity to the Gulf of Finland and the Baltic Sea. According to the Köppen climate classification (Dfb), the climate is characterized by cold winters extending from December to March, with temperatures often below freezing and regular snowfall, while summers are relatively short and mild, with temperatures typically ranging between 15 and 22 °C.
