= 1999 Men's EuroFloorball Cup qualifying =

1999 Men's European Cup
Qualifying

Tournament details
- Host country: Czech Republic
- Dates: 11–13 November 1999
- Teams: 6 (from 6 countries)

Final positions
- Champions: (Latvia) Hanzas Maiznica (Denmark) Herlev FC

Tournament statistics
- Matches played: 15
- Goals scored: 181 (12.07 per match)
- All statistics correct as of 04:28, 22 August 2008 (UTC).

The 1999 Men's EuroFloorball Cup Qualifying rounds took place over 11 to 13 November 1999 in Prague, Czech Republic. The top 2 teams advanced to the 1999 Men's EuroFloorball Cup Finals where they had a chance to win the EuroFloorball Cup.

The tournament was known as the 1999 Men's European Cup, but due to name implications, is now known as the 1999 Men's EuroFloorball Cup.

== Results ==
| Pos | Team | Pld | W | D | L | GF | GA | GD | Pts |
|---|---|---|---|---|---|---|---|---|---|
| 1 | (Latvia) Hanzas Maiznica | 5 | 5 | 0 | 0 | 59 | 14 | +45 | 10 |
| 2 | (Denmark) Herlev FC | 5 | 4 | 0 | 1 | 29 | 19 | +10 | 8 |
| 3 | (Hungary) Szolnok FK | 5 | 3 | 0 | 2 | 28 | 31 | −3 | 6 |
| 4 | (Poland) KS Podhale Nowy Targ | 5 | 2 | 0 | 3 | 31 | 26 | +5 | 4 |
| 5 | (Germany) USV Halle | 5 | 1 | 0 | 4 | 14 | 25 | −11 | 2 |
| 6 | (United Kingdom) Ericsson GB | 5 | 0 | 0 | 5 | 20 | 66 | −46 | 0 |

11 November 1999

| (Poland) KS Podhale Nowy Targ | 4–2 | (Germany) USV Halle |

Prague, Czech Republic

| (Denmark) Herlev FC | 5–3 | (Hungary) Szolnok FK |

Prague, Czech Republic

| (United Kingdom) Ericsson GB | 0–18 | (Latvia) Hanzas Maiznica |

Prague, Czech Republic

12 November 1999

| (Hungary) Szolnok FK | 6–2 | (Poland) KS Podhale Nowy Targ |

Prague, Czech Republic

| (Latvia) Hanzas Maiznica | 8–4 | (Denmark) Herlev FC |

Prague, Czech Republic

| (Germany) USV Halle | 6–3 | (United Kingdom) Ericsson GB |

Prague, Czech Republic

| (Poland) KS Podhale Nowy Targ | 6–10 | (Latvia) Hanzas Maiznica |

Prague, Czech Republic

| (Denmark) Herlev FC | 11–4 | (United Kingdom) Ericsson GB |

Prague, Czech Republic

| (Hungary) Szolnok FK | 3–2 | (Germany) USV Halle |

Prague, Czech Republic

13 November 1999

| (United Kingdom) Ericsson GB | 3–18 | (Poland) KS Podhale Nowy Targ |

Prague, Czech Republic

| (Germany) USV Halle | 3–4 | (Denmark) Herlev FC |

Prague, Czech Republic

| (Latvia) Hanzas Maiznica | 12–3 | (Hungary) Szolnok FK |

Prague, Czech Republic

| (Denmark) Herlev FC | 5–1 | (Poland) KS Podhale Nowy Targ |

Prague, Czech Republic

| (Latvia) Hanzas Maiznica | 11–1 | (Germany) USV Halle |

Prague, Czech Republic

| (Hungary) Szolnok FK | 13–10 | (United Kingdom) Ericsson GB |

Prague, Czech Republic

== See also ==
- 1999 Men's EuroFloorball Cup Finals

| Preceded by EuroFloorball Cup; 1998 | Current: EuroFloorball Cup; 1999 | Succeeded by EuroFloorball Cup; 2000 |
