= FK Kurši =

Latvian floorball club

- Founded: 1997
- League: Latvian Floorball League
- Location: Liepāja, Latvia
- Home ground: Liepājas sporta nams
- Colors: Black, White
- Head coach: Mārtiņš Krūms
- Manager: Egils Sveilis

FK Kurši is a floorball team based in Liepāja, Latvia playing in the Latvian Floorball League.
