= Ķekava (floorball club) =

Latvian floorball club

Ķekava Bulldogs
- Founded: 1996
- Arena: Ķekavas sporta nams
- Coach: (Latvia) Kristens Rubins
- League: Men's Highest Floorball League of Latvia
- Championships: Latvia (1998, 2000, 2001, 2003, 2004)

Ķekava Bulldogs is a Men's Highest Floorball League of Latvia team based in Ķekava, Latvia.

== Goaltenders ==
- 6 (Latvia) Jānis Bramanis
- 91 (Latvia) Ivars Dišereits

== Defencemen ==
- 4 (Latvia) Jānis Belasovs
- 11 (Latvia) Gints Timoško
- 12 (Latvia) Toms Briedis
- 21 (Latvia) Mārtiņš Druvkalns
- 33 (Latvia) Toms Mežotnis
- 46 (Latvia) Jānis Bilinskis

== Forwards ==
- 5 (Latvia) Jānis Liepa
- 8 (Latvia) Kristaps Jēkabsons
- 9 (Latvia) Gunārs Klēģers
- 10 (Latvia) Mārtiņš Brigmanis
- 15 (Latvia) Jānis Peičs
- 18 (Latvia) Ēriks Akulovs
- 25 (Latvia) Alvis Dāle
- 37 (Latvia) Sergejs Sevrjuks
- 44 (Latvia) Gints Klēģers
- 74 (Latvia) Gints Fricbergs
