= Latvian Floorball League =

ELVI Floorball League
- Founded: 1993
- Country: Latvia
- Number of clubs: 11
- Level on pyramid: 1
- Relegation to: 1st League
- International cup: Champions Cup
- Current champions: Lekrings
- Most championships: Lekrings (8 titles)
- Website: floorball.lv
- Current: 2024-25 season

The Latvian Men's Elite Floorball League (Latvian: Latvijas vīriešu florbola virslīga), also known as Elvi Floorball League for sponsorship reasons with the Latvian grocery chain Elvi, is the top men's floorball league in Latvia. There are 10 teams participating in the league 2024-25 season.

Throughout the regular season, each team plays two games against one another—one home and one away. Once the regular season ends, the top 8 teams qualify for the playoff round. The season standings determine the opponent the team plays in the postseason. The winners of the quarterfinals and semifinals are determined in a 7-game series, with the winner advancing after winning 4 games. The final is a single game played in a neutral location. Since the 2015/16 season, the final has been played in Arena Riga.

== Current clubs ==
Club	City
Lielvārde/Fatpipe	Lielvārde
FS Masters/Ulbroka	Ulbroka
Irlava	Irlava, Latvia
Lekrings	Cēsis
Rubene	Rubene
FBK Valmiera/Betsafe	Valmiera
FBK SĀC	Ādaži
RTU/Rockets	Rīga
Talsu NSS/Krauzers	Talsi
Bauska	Bauska
Ķekava/RB&B	Ķekava

== List of champions ==
=== Performance by club ===
- **Bold** indicates clubs currently playing in the top division.

Club	Titles	Winning Years(s)
**Lekrings**	8	1994, 1995, 1996, 2009, 2013, 2014, 2015, 2022
**Ķekava/RB&B**	5	1998, 2000, 2001, 2003, 2004
**Lielvārde/FatPipe**	4	2012, 2016, 2019, 2023
**Rubene**	3	2002, 2005, 2021
Lauku Avīze/LU	3	2006, 2007, 2008
**Ulbroka/Masters**	3	2017, 2018, 2024, 2025
**RTU/Rockets**	2	2010, 2011
Rēzeknes Maiznieks	1	1999
Līgatne	1	1997

== Former teams ==
- (Latvia) Blāzma
- (Latvia) FK Rīga
- (Latvia) SK Latvijas Avīze
- (Latvia) Uzvara lauks
- (Estonia) Fk Tähe Jõgeva
- (Latvia) FK Kurši
