= Throne Verse =

Verse in the Quran

Calligraphy of the Throne Verse

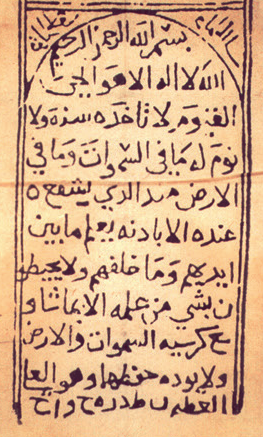
Block-printed Throne Verse, 1436–1444

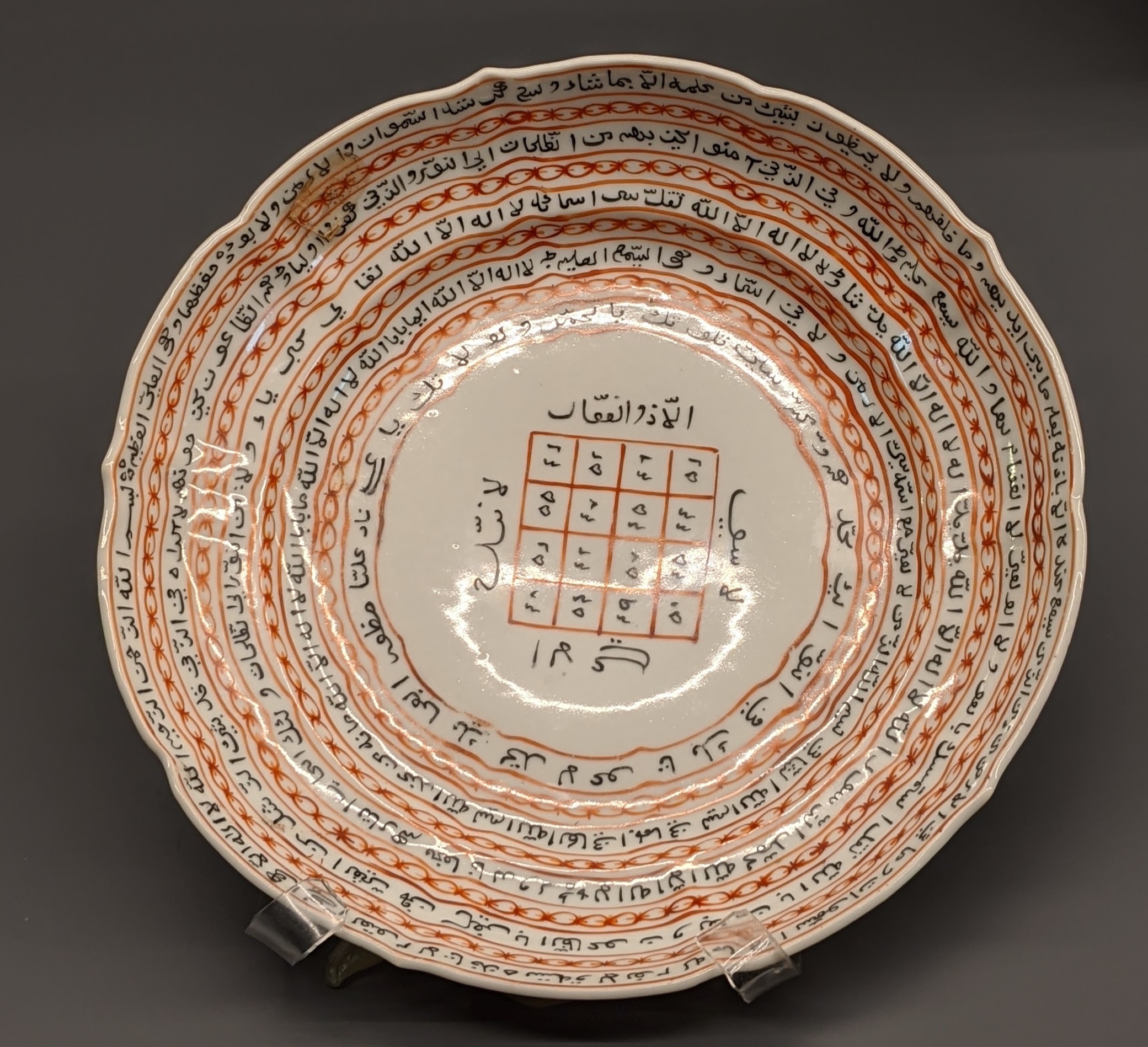
Chinese bowl with Throne verse, 1770–1800

Recitation by Abdul-Rahman Al-Sudais

Mujawwad recitation

Āyat al-Kursī (Arabic: آيَة ٱلْكُرْسِيّ), (Note: Al-Kursī refers to a 'chair' or 'footstool' of the throne of God, or the throne itself.) also known as the 'Throne Verse', is the 255th verse of the second chapter of the Quran, al-Baqara 2:255. Considered the greatest and one of the most well-known verses of the Quran, it is widely memorised and displayed in the Islamic faith.

The word Kursī —of which the ownership is given to Allah and from which this verse derives its name— is equated with Al-Arsh in many interpretations; the other expressions used in the same sentence underscore the impossibility of such a comparison, serving as the clearest statement—one that has become a hallmark of Islamic belief—that no one's power or greatness can be compared to His.

== English translation ==
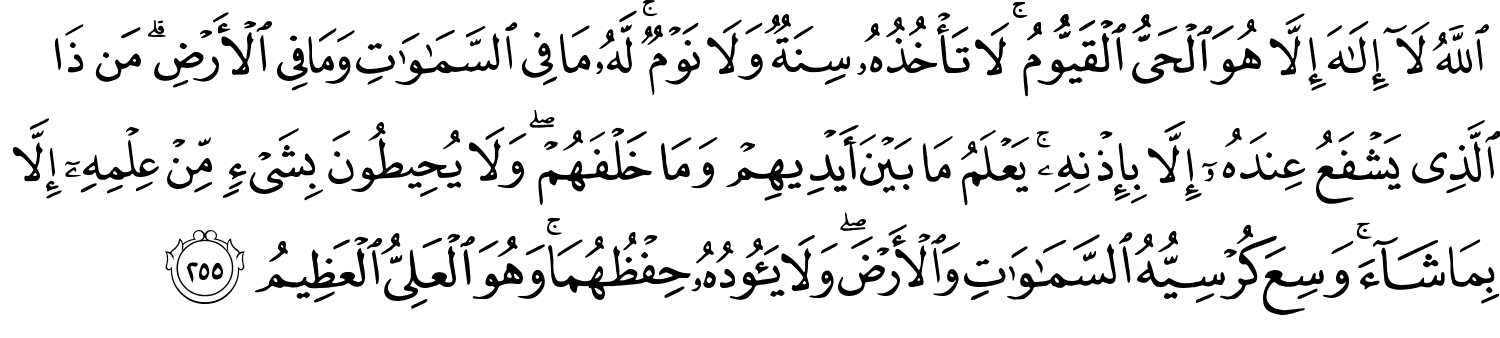
Q2:255 in Usmani script.

^{255} Allah: there is no god but Him, the Ever-Living, the Ever-Watchful. Neither slumber nor sleep overtakes Him. All that is in the heavens and in the earth belongs to Him. Who is there that can intercede with Him except by His leave? He knows what is before them and what is behind them, but they do not comprehend any of His knowledge except what He wills. His Seat extends over the heavens and the earth; it does not weary Him to preserve them both. He is the Most High, the Tremendous

== Structure ==
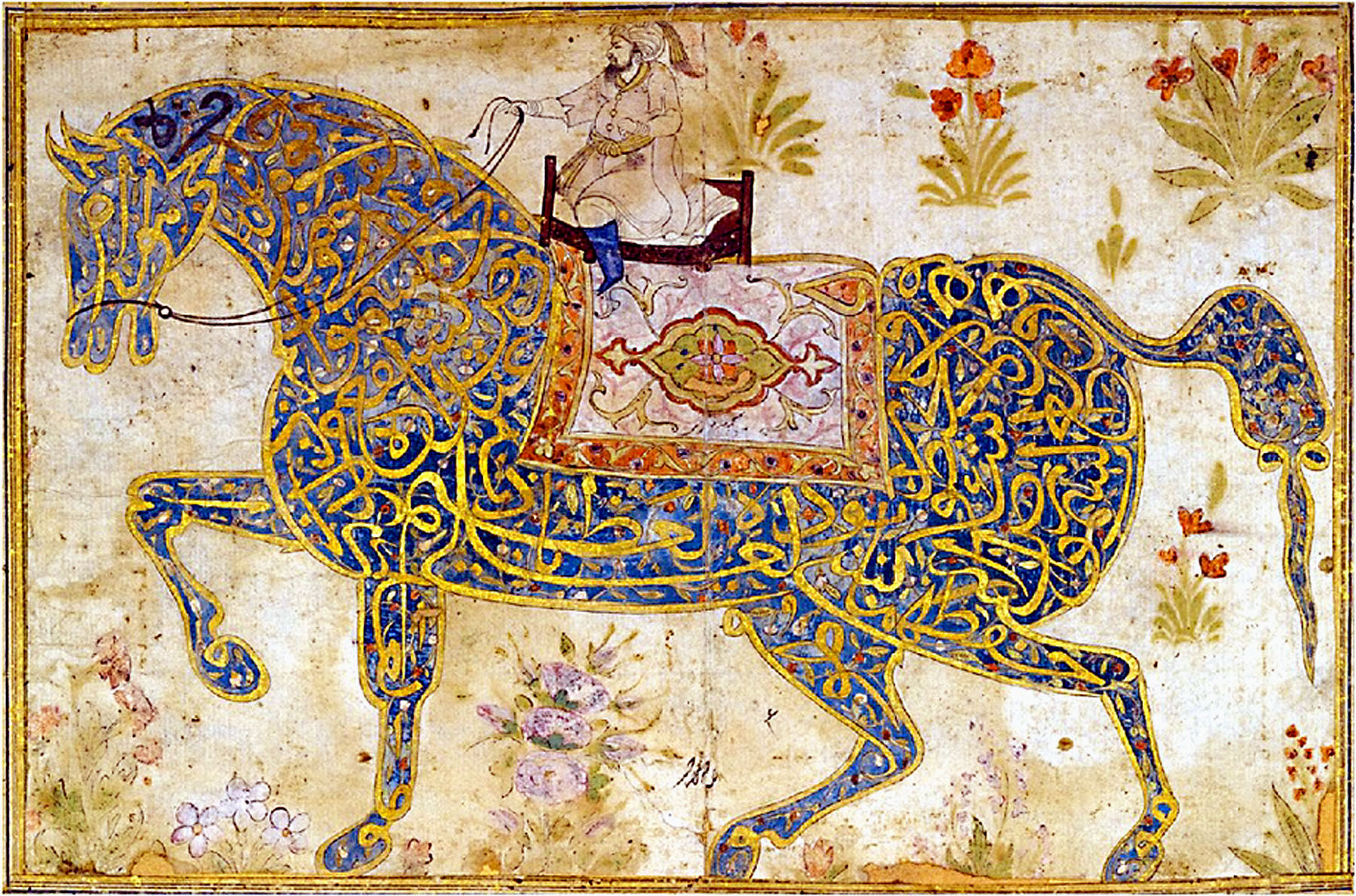
The Throne verse in the form of a calligraphic horse (India, Deccan, Bijapur) - 16th century.

The structure of the ayah (verse) is represented by concentrism, which is the most prevalent type of symmetry in the Qur'an. a symmetrical structure, wherein units of text are arranged concentrically (ABCD/x/D’C’B’A’). The relationship between those units is one of identity: terms and segments have similar meanings, and each segment responds or corresponds to its pair.

== al-Kursī ==
The word "al-Kursī" could be casually translated today as a stool or chair. (Note: Al-Kursi refers to a chair or footstool of the throne of God or the throne itself.) Sevan Nişanyan says that this word is derived from the Aramaic-Syriac word kūrsayā (כרסא/כרסיא), which has the same meaning as 'chair' or 'throne'.

However, by examining Islamic texts where God is depicted as a king, (Note: Qira’at: All except for ʻAsem, Al-Kesa’i, Yaʻqub and Khalaf in one of his narrations read it as ^{4} King of the Day of Judgement.) this translation —which implies worthlessness in contrast to His greatness— is converted to a throne. Historically, however, the word may be connected to another usage, the pulpit. A pulpit is a place where an orator delivers informative talks to an audience, either standing or seated, and some narratives associate it with knowledge. In Turkish, "Kürsü" is also used to refer to an -academic- department.

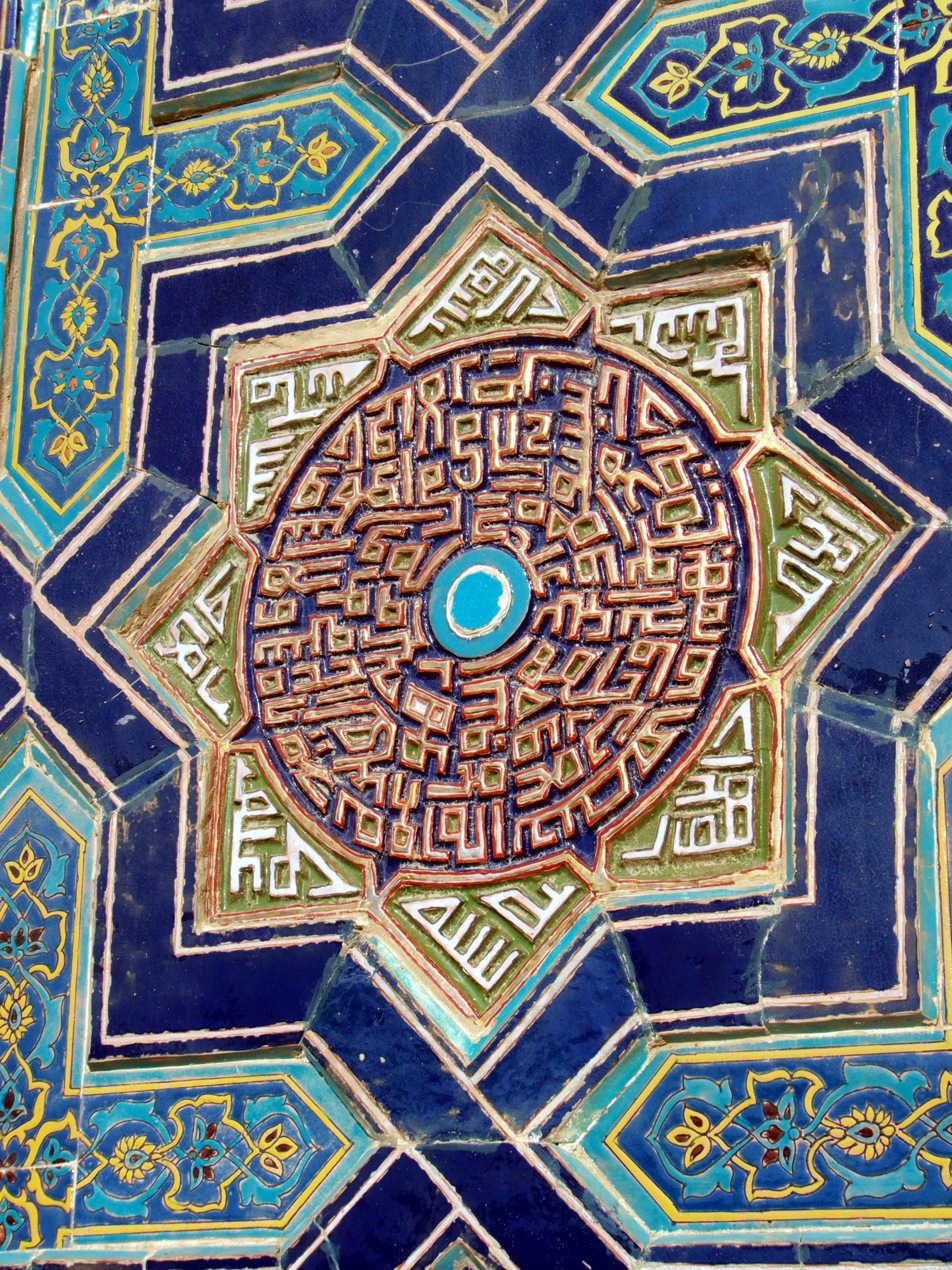
Throne verse on the facade of Ali Nasafi Tomb (Shah-i-Zinda), Samarkand, Uzbekistan

In Early Islam, the concepts of the Throne (Arsh), Pulpit (Kursi), Pen (Qalam), and others Bearers of the Throne etc described as being in the immediate vicinity of Allah, who is considered a personal deity, living in the heavens along with concepts such as Allah's sitting on a Throne, His right, and His left, led to problems of understanding in later periods, when Islamic theology developed and adopted a transcendent understanding of God. While these concepts were sometimes interpreted by theologians as metaphorical expressions intended to emphasize transcendence, others approached them with the attitude of "we believe in the essence, but we don't investigate how it is"; "It (al-Kursī) is the "seat" of God's power, but without God sitting on it with bones, since bones and body belong to the created things".

== Interpretation and tradition ==
It is said (ḥadīṯ) that reciting this verse wards off devils (šayāṭīn) and fiends (ʿafārīt), and its recitation after every obligatory prayer prevents nothing from entering Paradise except death.

Al-Suyuti narrates that a man from humanity and a man from the jinn met. Whereupon, as means of reward for defeating the jinn in a wrestling match, the jinn teaches a Quranic verses that if recited, no devil (šayṭān) will enter the man's house with him, which is the "Throne Verse".

Due to the association with protection, it is believed to shield against the evil eye.

Ayat al-Kursi is regarded as the greatest verse of Quran according to the hadith. The verse is regarded as one of the most powerful in the Quran because when it is recited, the greatness of God is believed to be confirmed. The person who recites this ayat morning and evening will be under protection of God from the evil of the jinn and the shayatin (devils); this is also known as the daily adkhar.

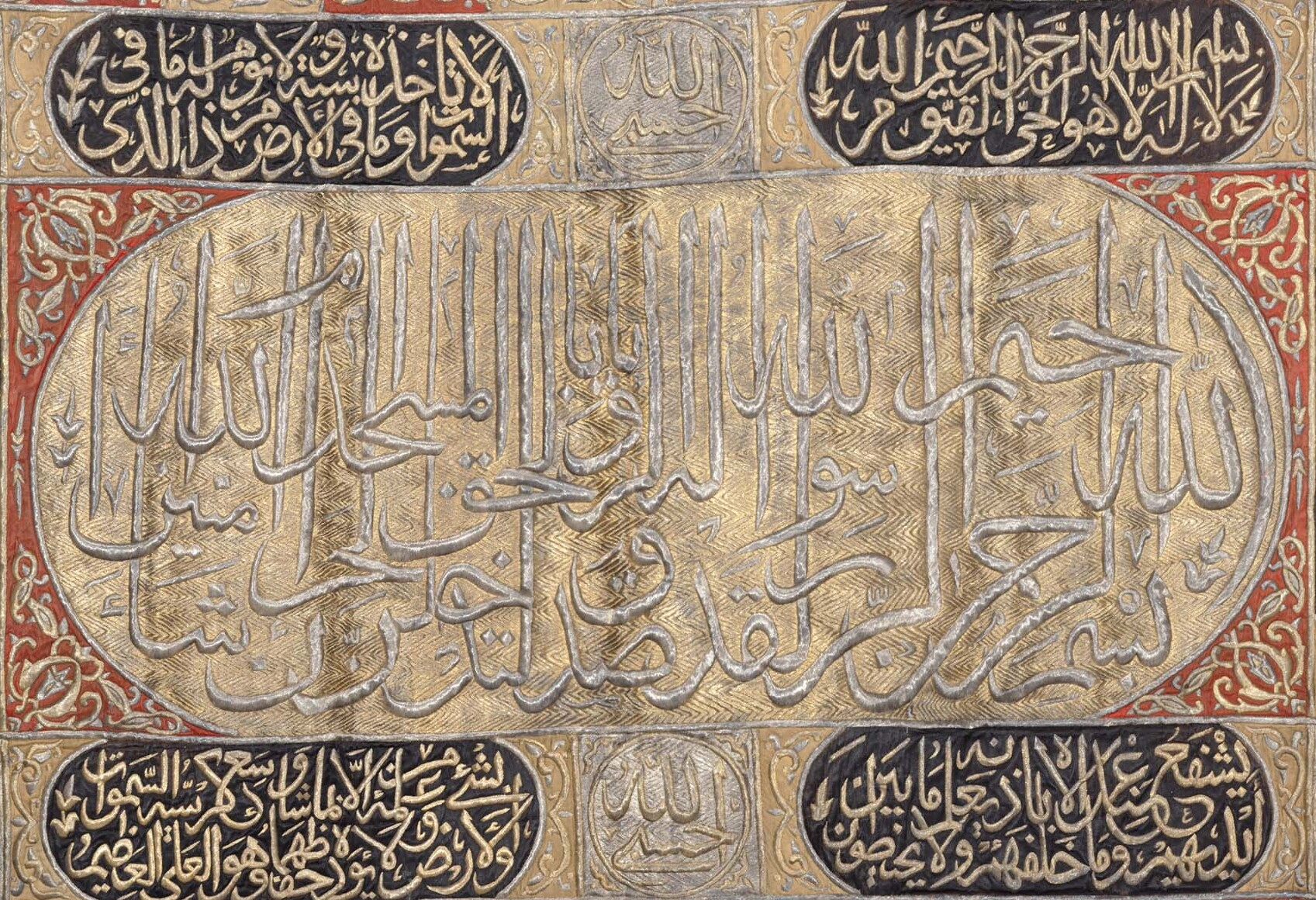
Throne verse on a historic Kiswah cloth (1846-7

It is used in exorcism, to cure and protect from jinn and shayatin (devils). Because the Throne Verse is believed to grant spiritual and physical protection, it is often recited by Muslims before setting out on a journey and before going to sleep. Reciting the verse after every prayer is believed to grant quick entry to paradise without any delay.

== Gallery ==
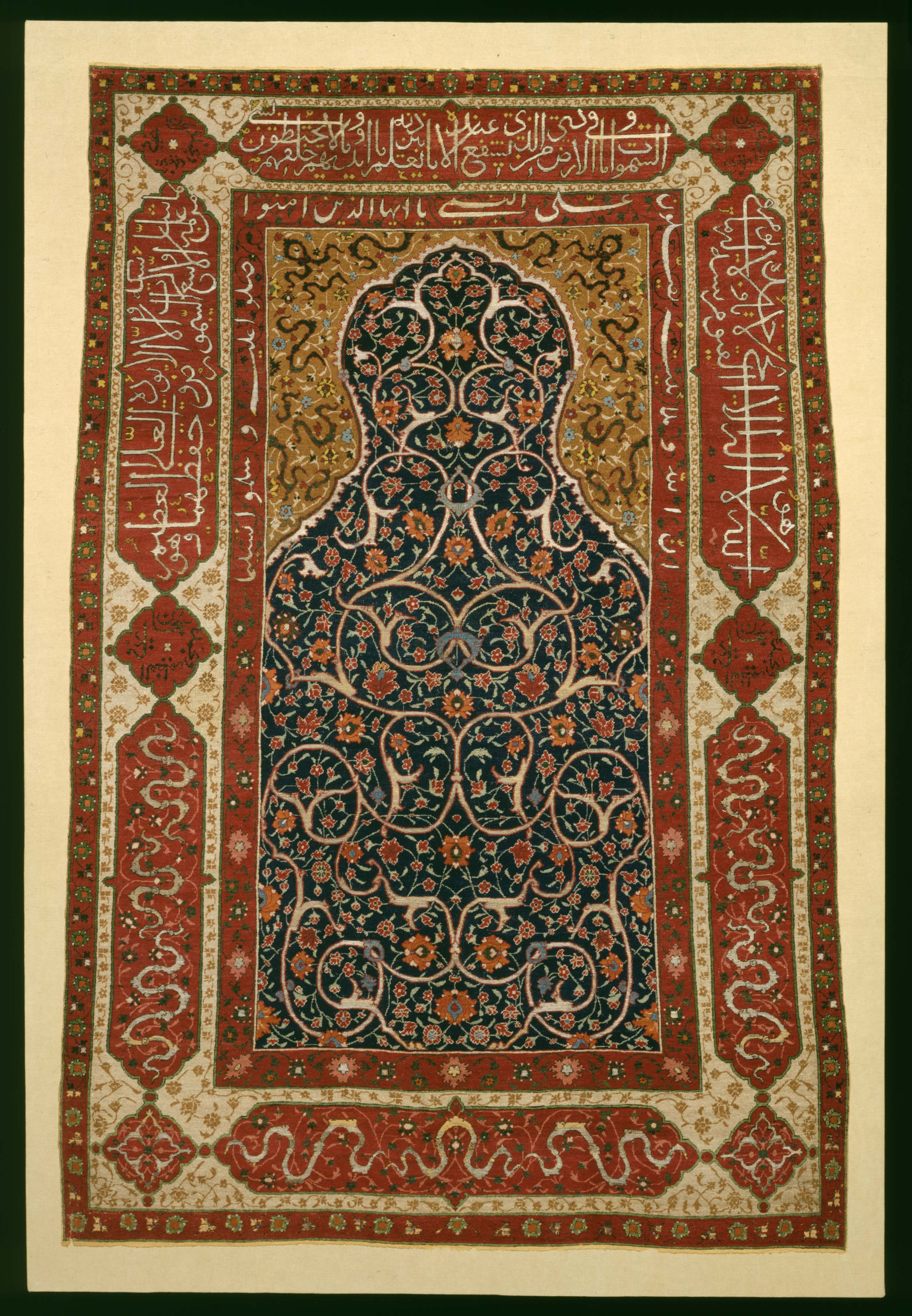
Rug that would be placed on the Mihrab containing ayat al-Kursi (1570-80)

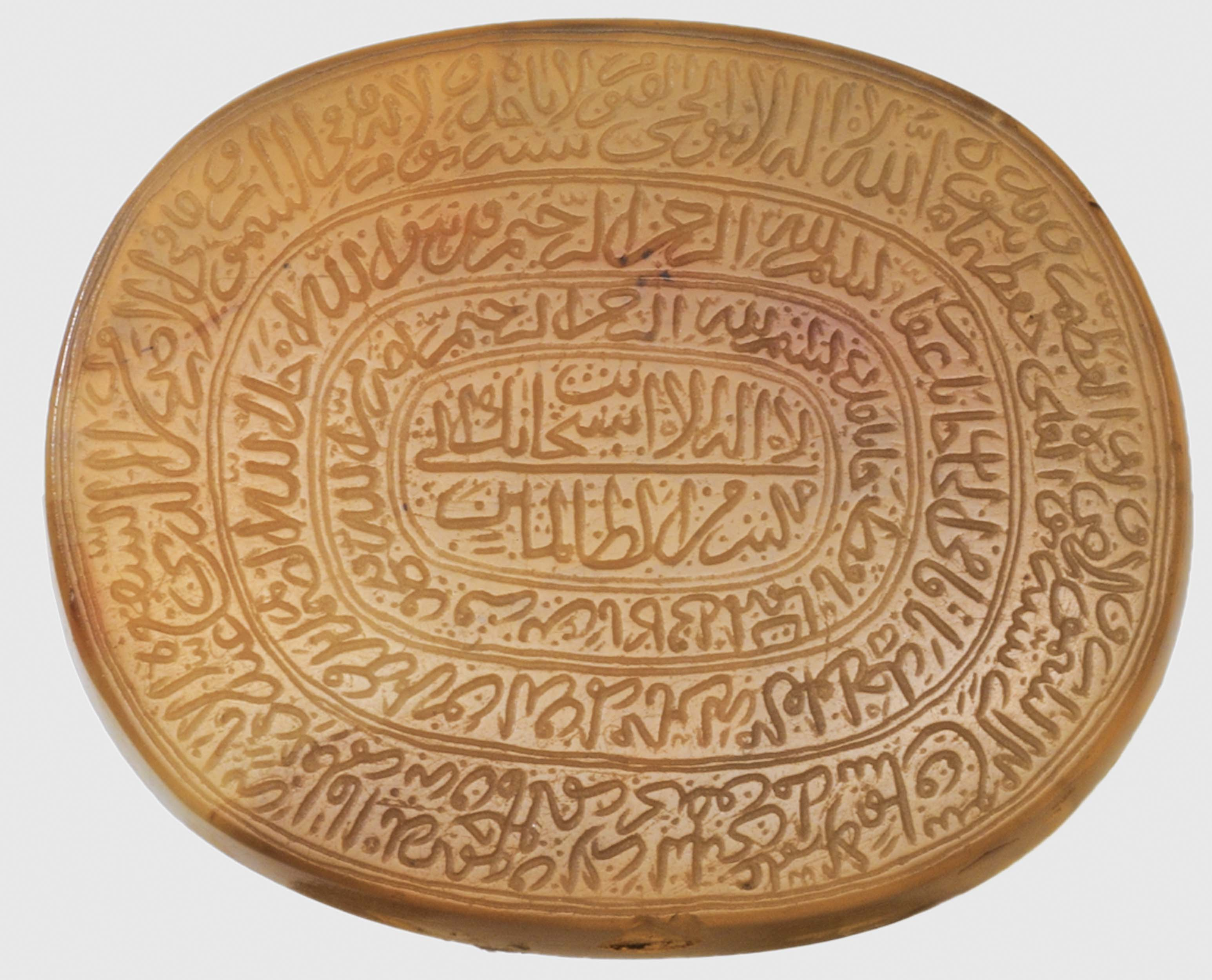
Amulet with Throne verse on outer band (19th century)

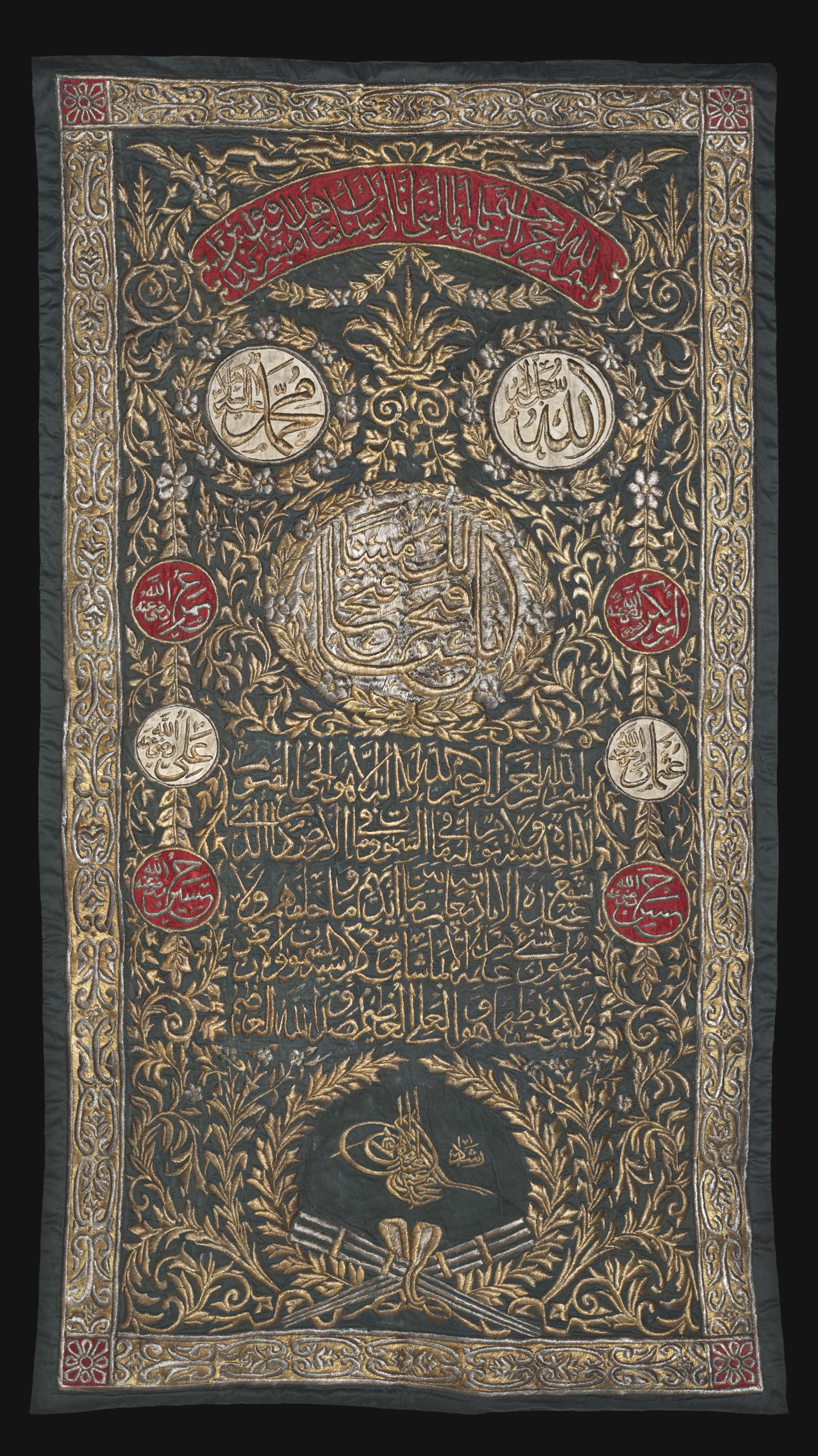
Another Kiswah cloth with Ayat al Kursi (1907-1918)

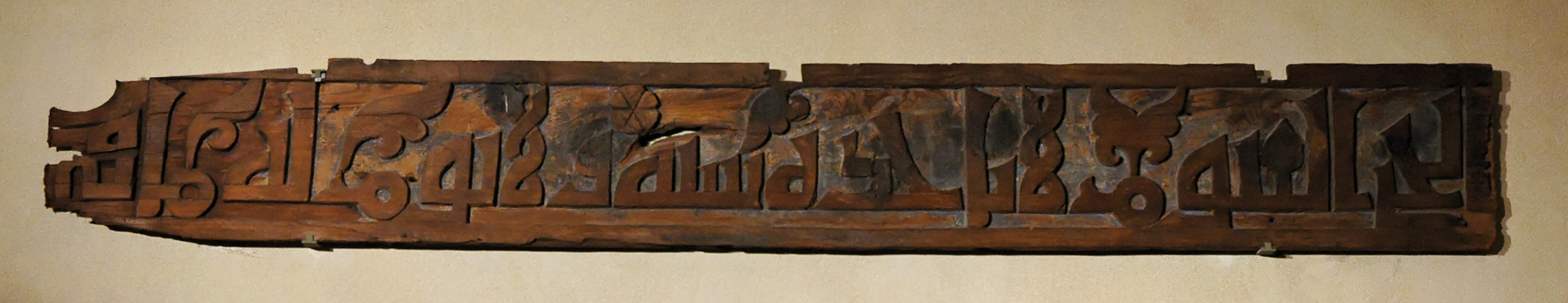
Late 10th century Fatimid freize of Aleppo pine with Throne verse

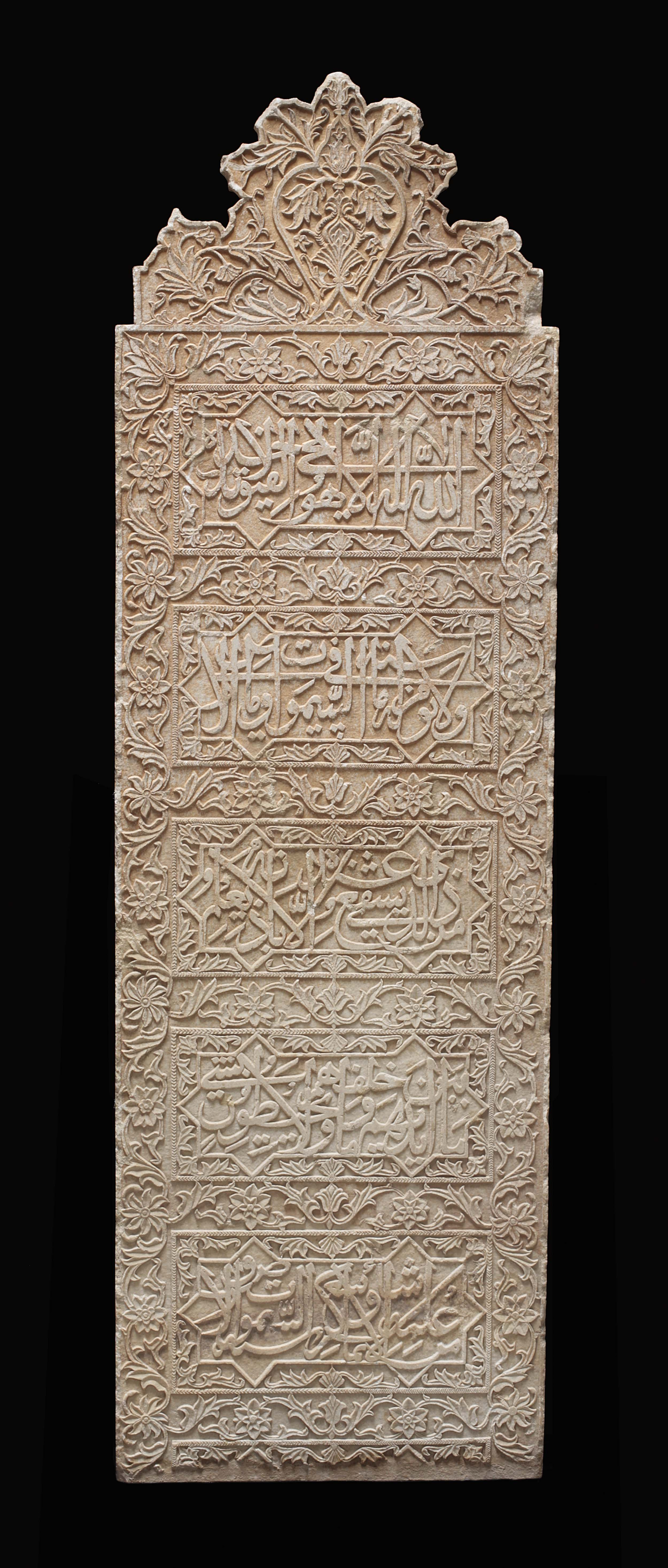
Most of the Throne verse on the back of a standing stone from 17th-century India

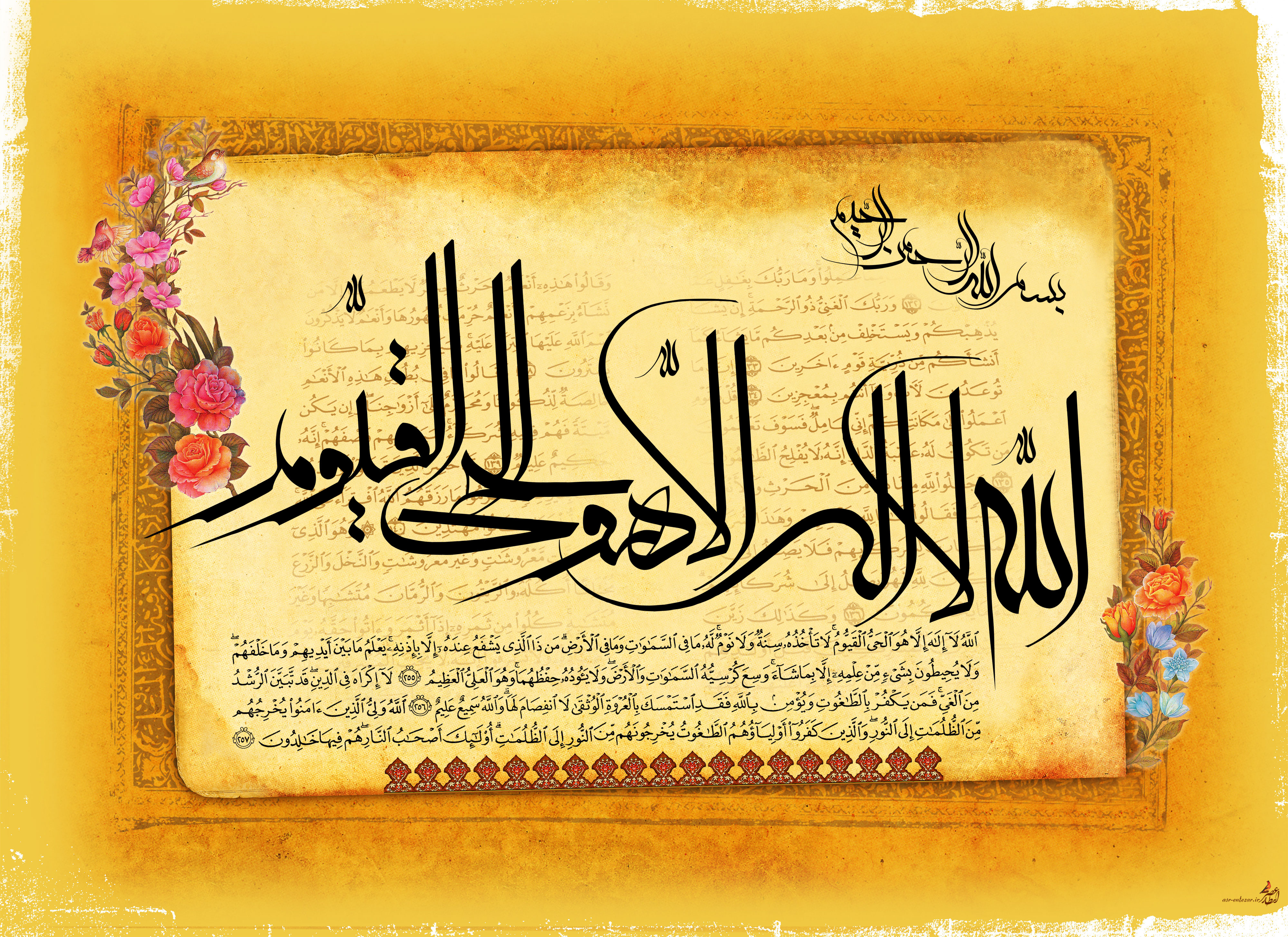
Contemporary Islamic calligraphy of Throne Verse including the 256th and the 257th verse

== See also ==
- Al-Ḥayy
- Al-Falaq (Daybreak)
- Al-Nas (Mankind)
- Verses of Refuge
- Exorcism in Islam
- Ismul Azam
- Verse of Light
- Al-Baqara 256
