= Núñez =

Núñez (pronounced [ˈnuɲeθ], anglicized as Nunez) is a Spanish surname. The Portuguese (and Old Galician) variant is Nunes. Notable people with the name include:

== Academia ==
- Antonio Núñez Jiménez, Cuban revolutionary and academic
- Jorge Núñez Prida, Mexican engineer and Scouting president
- Juan Núñez de la Peña (1641–1721), Spanish historian
- Lautaro Núñez Atencio (born 1936), Chilean historian
- Martin A. Núñez (Born 1977), Argentinean Ecologist

== Arts ==
- Bonita Wa Wa Calachaw Nuñez (1888—1972), Native American artist
- Françoise Nuñez (1957–2021), French photographer

== Drama ==
- Conchita Núñez (1943–2009), Spanish actress
- Joe Nunez, American actor
- Miguel A. Núñez, Jr. (born 1964), American actor
- Oscar Nunez (born 1958), United States actor and comedian
- Oscar Núñez (Argentine actor) (1929–2012)

== Exploration ==
- Álvar Núñez Cabeza de Vaca, Spanish explorer
- Vasco Núñez de Balboa, Spanish explorer, governor, and conquistador

== Literature ==
=== Authors ===
- Albino Núñez Domínguez (1901–1974), Galician writer and poet
- Elizabeth Nunez (1944–2024), United States writer
- Hernán Núñez (1475–1553), Spanish writer and collector of proverbs
- José Rafael Núñez Tenorio, Venezuelan philosopher
- Sigrid Nunez (born 1951), United States writer
- Silvia Núñez del Arco, Peruvian author

=== Fictional ===
- Alex Nuñez, a character in Degrassi: The Next Generation
- Claire Nuñez, one of the main characters in "Trollhunters"

== Music ==
- Alcide Nunez (1884–1934), United States jazz clarinetist
- Alejandro Núñez Allauca (born 1943), Peruvian composer and accordionist
- Antonio Escobar Núñez (born 1976), a Spanish composer, music producer and sound designer
- Carlos Núñez Cortés (born 1942), a member of Argentine comedy-musical group Les Luthiers
- Carlos Núñez Muñoz (born 1971), Spanish musician from Galicia
- Jorge Núñez (singer), American Idol contestant
- José Nunez, United States electronica and house music producer
- Juan Carlos Núñez, Venezuelan composer

== Politics and military ==
- Aaron Nunez Cardozo, 1762–1834, Gibraltarian consul for Tunis and Algie
- Alberto Núñez Feijóo (born 1961), Spanish politician
- Blasco Núñez Vela (c. 1490–1546), Spanish viceroy of Peru
- Casto Méndez Núñez (1824–1869), Spanish military naval officer
- Carmen Rosa Núñez Campos (born 1954), Peruvian entrepreneur and politician
- Corazon Nuñez-Malanyaon, Philippine politician
- Devin Nunes (born 1973), member of the United States Congress and chair of the House Intelligence Committee
- Emilio Núñez (1855–1922), Cuban soldier, dentist, and politician
- Emilio Núñez Portuondo (1898–1978), Cuban politician
- Fabian Núñez (born 1966), US-American politician
- Hershel Nunez, American politician
- José Núñez de Cáceres (1772–1846), Dominican politician and writer
- Laurent Nuñez (born 1964), French politician
- Marco Antonio Núñez (born 1966), Chilean politician
- Nelly Núñez (1948–2021), Bolivian politician
- Osvaldo Nunez, Canadian politician
- Rafael Núñez (politician), President of Colombia in the 1880s and 1890s
- Samuel B. Nunez, Jr., Louisiana politician
- Yerko Núñez (born 1973), Bolivian politician

== Sport ==
=== Baseball ===
- Abraham Núñez (baseball infielder) (born 1976), Major League Baseball infielder
- Abraham Núñez (baseball outfielder) (born 1977), Major League Baseball outfielder
- Anthony Nunez (born 2001), American baseball player
- Clemente Núñez (born 1975), Dominican professional baseball player
- Dedniel Núñez (born 1996), Dominican baseball player
- Dom Núñez (born 1995), Major League Baseball catcher
- Eduardo Núñez (born 1987), Major League Baseball infielder
- Juan Carlos Oviedo (born 1982), Major League Baseball pitcher, called himself Leo Núñez before 2011
- Nasim Nuñez (born 2000), Major League Baseball infielder

=== Association football ===
- Álvaro Adrián Núñez (born 1973), Uruguayan goalkeeper
- Antonio Núñez (born 1979), Spanish footballer
- Claudio Núñez (born 1975), Chilean footballer
- Darwin Núñez (born 1999), Uruguayan footballer
- Gervasio Núñez (born 1988), Argentine footballer
- Jorge Martín Núñez (born 1978), Paraguayan footballer
- Josep Lluís Núñez (1931–2018), former president of FC Barcelona
- Leonel Núñez (born 1984), Johor Darul Takzim FC player
- Marcelino Núñez (born 2000), Chilean footballer
- Milton Núñez (born 1972), Honduran footballer
- Nicolás Núñez (born 1984), Chilean footballer
- Ramón Núñez (born 1985), Honduran-American footballer
- Rodrigo Núñez (born 1977), Chilean footballer
- Sergio Núñez (born 2000), Uruguayan footballer
- Vas Núñez (born 1995) ,Hong Kong footballer

=== Other sport ===
- José María Núñez Piossek (born 1976), A rugby union player
- Matt Nunez (born 1989), American floorball player
- Sidarka Núñez (born 1984), Dominican Republic volleyball player
- Tommy Nuñez (1938–2026), American basketball referee

== Science and medicine ==
- Álvaro Núñez, Chilean physicist
- Manuel Núñez Tovar (1872–1928), Venezuelan naturalist, researcher, parasitologist and entomologist
- Rafael E. Núñez, cognitive scientist
- Samuel Nunez (1668–1744), United States physician and early Jewish settler in Georgia

== Other ==
- Aloha Núñez (born 1983), Venezuelan politician
- Marianela Núñez (born 1982), Argentine ballet dancer
