= Patrick Dousa =

American floorball player

Personal information
- Nationality: United States Sweden
- Born: July 1, 1992 (age 32); Dallas, Texas, United States

Sport
- Sport: Floorball
- Position: Forward
- Shoots: Left
- Team: United States national floorball team

Lars Patrick Dousa (born July 1, 1992) is an American floorball player who plays as a forward. He has won two caps for the United States national floorball team. Born in the United States, he also holds a Swedish citizenship.

== Early life ==
Born in Dallas, Texas to Swedish parents, Dousa moved to Stockholm, Sweden with his family in 1996. Growing up in northern Stockholm, he picked up the sport of floorball and represented the local floorball club Åkersberga IBF all the way from the youth teams to the senior team. In 2013, he returned to the United States to attend Wilmington College in Wilmington, Ohio as a marketing major.

== Floorball career ==
In November 2013, Dousa was called up to the United States national floorball team for their 2014 World Floorball Championships qualifying campaign after impressing national team scouts at a floorball tournament in Westchester, New York. He made his full international debut for the United States on January 31, 2014, in a World Championship qualifier against Jamaica, scoring one goal and providing one assist in a 27–0 win. He won his second cap on February 2, 2014, in a qualifier against Canada, helping the United States clinch a spot at the 2014 World Floorball Championships through a 5–2 win. Despite contributing to United States' qualification for the World Championship, he was not selected for the final tournament held in Gothenburg, Sweden in December 2014.

In 2015, Dousa helped the Dallas-based floorball team the Lonestar Lions win the 2015 Lonestar Invitational Floorball Tournament (LIFT) in Arlington, Texas, playing alongside future United States international Matt Nunez.

== Career statistics ==
=== International ===
Appearances, goals, assists, and points by national team and year
National team	Year	Apps	Goals	Assists	Points
United States	2014	2	1	1	2
Total		2	1	1	2

Scores and results list United States' goal tally first, score column indicates score after each Dousa goal.

List of international goals scored by Patrick Dousa
No.	Date	Venue	Opponent	Score	Result	Competition	Ref.
1	January 31, 2014	Cornell Community Centre, Markham, Canada	Jamaica	14–0	27–0	2014 World Floorball Championships qualifying	

== Honors ==
Lonestar Lions

- Lonestar Invitational Floorball Tournament (LIFT): 2015
