= Dousa =

Dousa is a surname. Notable people with the surname include:

- Andrew Dousa Hepburn (1830–1921), Presbyterian pastor, professor and President of Miami University and Davidson College
- Benjamin Dousa (born 1992), Swedish politician
- Franciscus Dousa (1577–1630), Dutch classical scholar
- Janus Dousa (1545–1604), Dutch statesman, jurist, historian, poet and philologist and the first Librarian of Leiden University Library
- Patrick Dousa (born 1992), American floorball player
