= Emil Johansson (floorball) =

Swedish floorball player (born 1992)

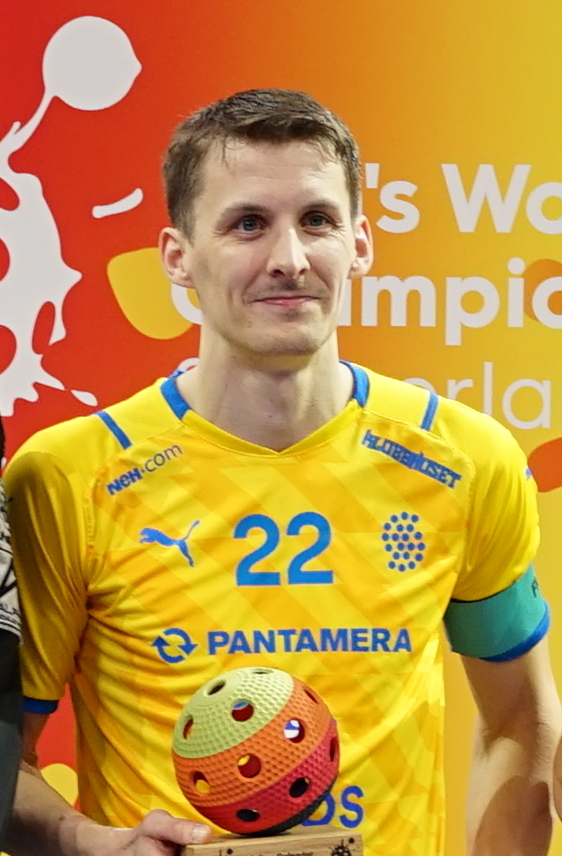
- Emil Johansson at the WFC 2022.

Personal information
- National team: Sweden
- Born: Emil Tobias Johansson; 14 August 1992 (age 33) Umeå, Sweden

Sport
- Sport: Floorball
- Position: Defender
- League: Swedish Super League (2013–)
- Team: Ersboda SK; Böle BK (2004–2005); RIG Umeå IBF (2007–2010); Umeå City IBK (2010–2013); IBF Falun (2013–)
Medal record
Representing Sweden
World Championships
Gold medal – first place	2014 Sweden
Silver medal – second place	2016 Latvia
Silver medal – second place	2018 Czech Republic
Gold medal – first place	2020 Finland
Gold medal – first place	2022 Switzerland
Silver medal – second place	2024 Sweden
World Games
Gold medal – first place	2017 Poland
Gold medal – first place	2022 United States
U19 World Championships
Silver medal – second place	2011 Germany

Emil Tobias Hallqvist-Johansson (born 14 August 1992) is a Swedish floorball defender and national team player. He is a three-time world champion, a seven-time winner of the Swedish Super League, and one of the greatest floorball players in history. He has been playing for the Swedish club IBF Falun since 2013.

== Club career ==
=== Early career ===
Johansson began his floorball career with the club Ersboda SK. In the 2004–05 season, he played for Böle BK before returning to his parent club. He stayed there until the 2007–08 season, when he moved to RIG Umeå IBF to combine his high school studies with playing at the national floorball gymnasium.

=== Umeå City IBK ===
At the end of 2010, at just 19 years old, he was signed by Umeå City IBK for the Swedish Super League, even though he had not yet finished high school. His first full season in the top tier was 2011–12, which ultimately resulted in the team's relegation to Allsvenskan. Towards the end of the 2012–13 season, in which he collected 53 points in 15 games in the second division, he was scouted by IBF Falun.

=== IBF Falun ===
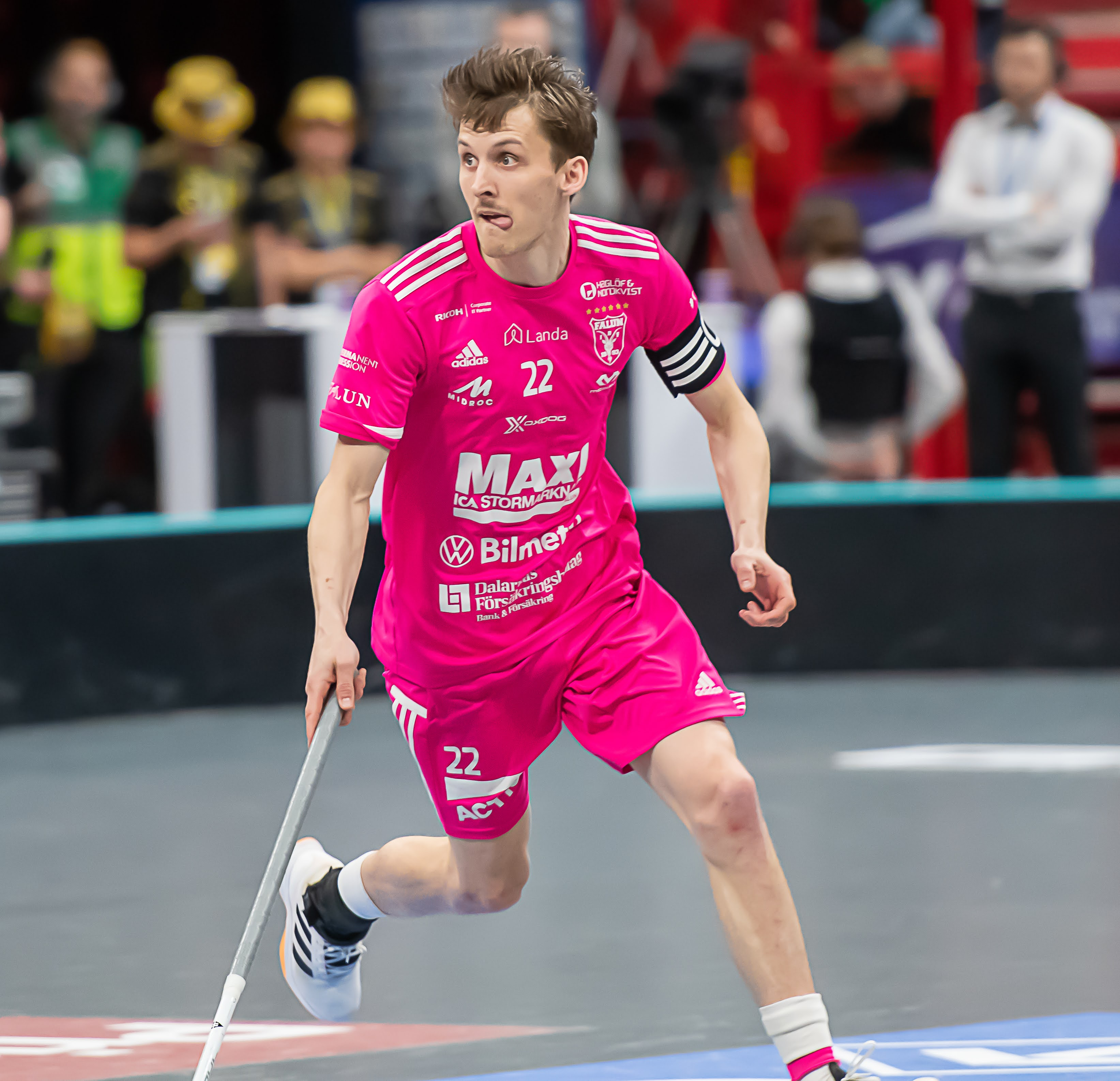
Johansson as the captain of IBF Falun in the Swedish Super League final in 2022.

Immediately after transferring, he reached the final with Falun and won the club's first championship title. He also became the Swedish champion with Falun in the following two seasons. He added four more Super League gold medals in the 2016–17, 2019–20, 2020–21, and 2021–22 seasons. They also won the Champions Cup five times.

His role in the team grew with each season, and he gradually developed into one of the best players in the entire league. He has been the team captain since 2018. During his time at Falun, he was named the Swedish Super League Player of the season twice (2019 and 2020). In addition, he was named Defender of the season six times (2016, 2017, 2019 to 2021, and 2023), an achievement no other defender in the league's history has matched. In 2019, 2022, and 2023, he was named the world's best floorball player.

== International career ==
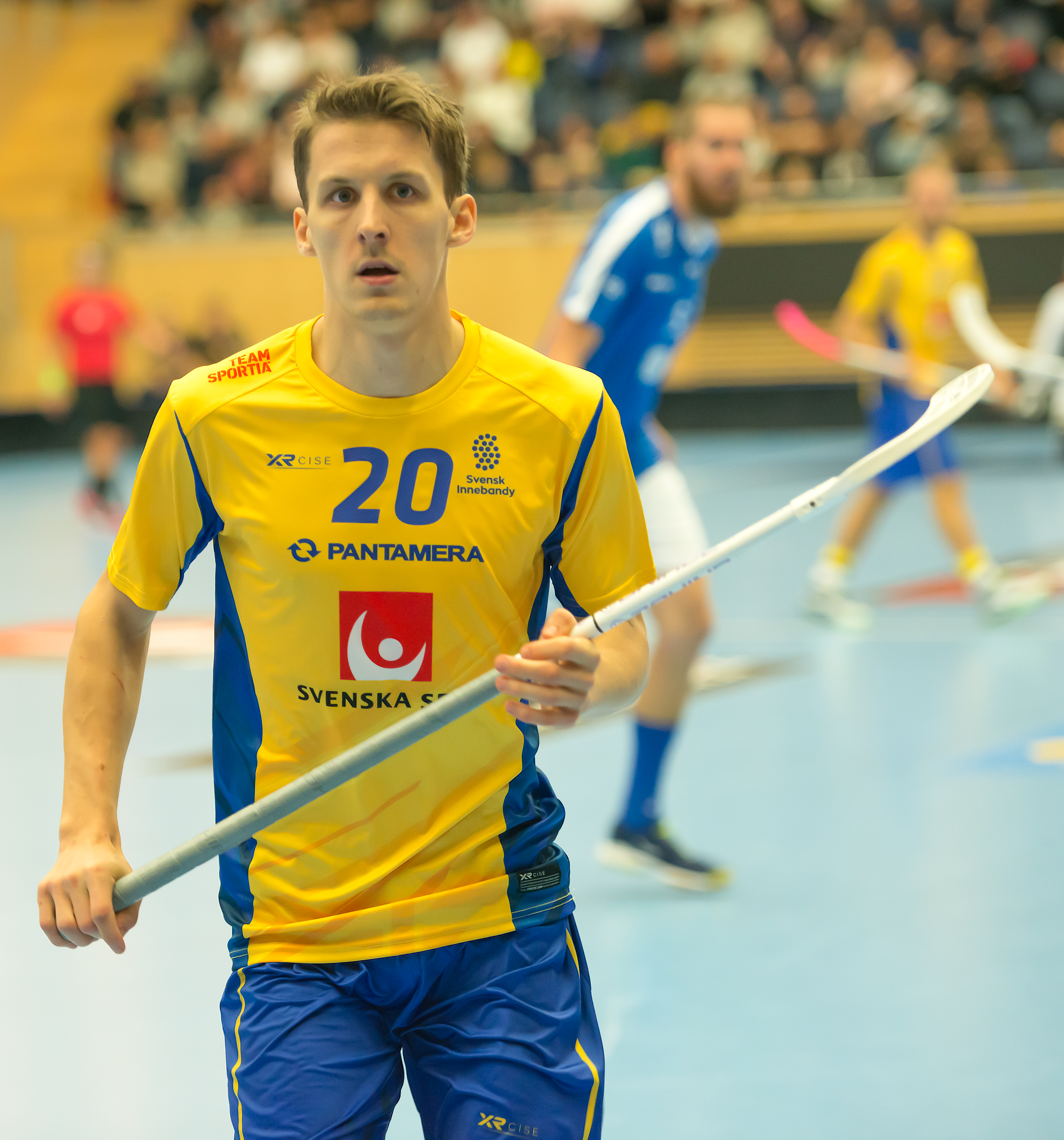
Johansson in the Swedish national team jersey at the Euro Floorball Tour in 2018.

Johansson was nominated to the Swedish under-19 national team for the 2011 U19 World Championship, where the Swedes took home silver medals after losing to Finland in the final.

He made his debut for the Swedish men's national team in 2013 in a match against the Czech Republic. In 2014, he participated in his first World Championship and celebrated winning the gold medal with the team on home soil. Two years later, he played in the 2016 World Championship in Riga, Latvia, which ended with a silver medal for Sweden after losing to Finland in a penalty shootout. The 2018 World Championship in Prague ended similarly for the Swedes, where Johansson was named to the All-Star team. At the tournaments in 2020 (played in 2021) and 2022, Sweden won again, and Johansson added two more world championship titles to his collection. In the latter, he served as team captain and was once again selected for the tournament's All-Star team.

Year	Team	Event	Result
2011	Sweden U-19	WFC U-19	2nd place, silver medalist(s)
2014	Sweden	WFC	1st place, gold medalist(s)
2016	Sweden	WFC	2nd place, silver medalist(s)
2017	Sweden	WG	1st place, gold medalist(s)
2018	Sweden	WFC	2nd place, silver medalist(s)
2020	Sweden	WFC	1st place, gold medalist(s)
2022	Sweden	WG	1st place, gold medalist(s)
2022	Sweden	WFC	1st place, gold medalist(s)
2024	Sweden	WFC	2nd place, silver medalist(s)
