= Prida =

Prida can refer to:

== People ==
- Dolores Prida (1943–2013), Cuban-American columnist and playwright
- Joaquín Fernández Prida (1865–1942), Spanish lawyer and politician
- Jorge Núñez Prida

== Other ==
- Prida (spider), a genus of spiders in the family Oonopidae
