= 2006 Men's World Floorball Championships C-Division =

Floorball competition

2006 Men's World Floorball Championships
C-Division

Tournament details
- Host country: Spain
- Dates: May 3–7, 2006
- Teams: 6

Final positions
- Champions: Poland

Tournament statistics
- Matches played: 15
- Goals scored: 158 (10.53 per match)
- All statistics correct as of 04:55, April 13, 2009 (UTC).

The 2006 Men's World Floorball Championships C-Division took place over May 3–7, 2006 in San Lorenzo de El Escorial, Spain.

The 2006 Men's World Floorball Championships were the second men's floorball championships that required a C-Division.

== Championship results ==
Team	Pld	W	D	L	GF	GA	GD	Pts
Poland	5	4	0	1	48	14	+34	8
Spain	5	4	0	1	27	16	+11	8
Slovakia	5	4	0	1	32	11	+21	8
Canada	5	2	0	3	30	24	+6	4
France	5	1	0	4	19	23	−4	2
(South Korea) Korea	5	0	0	5	2	70	−68	0

May 3, 2006
Korea (South Korea)	2–11	Spain
Canada	3–7	Poland
France	2–5	Slovakia
May 4, 2006
Spain	2–1	France
Slovakia	4–2	Canada
Poland	22–0	(South Korea) Korea
May 5, 2006
Korea (South Korea)	0–12	Canada
France	4–8	Poland
Spain	1–3	Slovakia
May 6, 2006
Slovakia	19–0	(South Korea) Korea
Canada	8–6	France
Poland	5–6	Spain
May 7, 2006
Korea (South Korea)	0–6	France
Poland	6–1	Slovakia
Spain	7–5	Canada

== Standings ==
Official 2006 Rankings according to the IFF

Rk.	Team
1st place, gold medalist(s)	Poland
2nd place, silver medalist(s)	Spain
3rd place, bronze medalist(s)	Slovakia
4.	Canada
5.	France
6.	(South Korea) Korea

== See also ==
- 2006 Men's World Floorball Championships

Men's World Floorball Championships C-Division
Preceded by Leganés, Spain; 2004	Host City; San Lorenzo, Spain; 2006	Succeeded by Bratislava, Slovakia; 2008
