= Matt Nunez =

American floorball player

Personal information
- Nationality: United States
- Born: March 25, 1989 (age 35); Texas, United States

Sport
- Sport: Floorball
- Position: Defender
- Shoots: Right
- Team: United States national floorball team

Matt Nunez (born March 25, 1989) is an American floorball player who plays as a defender. He has won eight caps for the United States national floorball team and represented the United States at the 2016 World Floorball Championships in Riga, Latvia.

== Floorball career ==
In April 2015, Nunez helped the Dallas-based floorball team the Lonestar Lions win the 2015 Southwest US Floorball Championship in Keene, Texas. He also played at the 2015 Lonestar Invitational Floorball Tournament (LIFT) in Arlington, Texas alongside fellow international floorballer Patrick Dousa, as the Lonestar Lions won another trophy. Nunez was named in the All-Tournament Team for his efforts in the competition.

In the following year, Nunez made his international debut for the United States national floorball team during the 2016 World Floorball Championships qualifying campaign as he played in games against both Jamaica and Canada. He scored his first international goal in the 27–1 win against Jamaica as the United States qualified for the 2016 World Floorball Championships in Riga, Latvia.

In December 2016, Nunez was part of the United States team that finished eleventh at the 2016 World Floorball Championships after winning Group D ahead of Canada, Singapore, and Thailand before being eliminated in the play-off round by Germany.

== Career statistics ==
=== International ===
Appearances, goals, assists, and points by national team and year
National team	Year	Apps	Goals	Assists	Points
United States	2016	8	1	0	1
Total		8	1	0	1

Scores and results list United States' goal tally first, score column indicates score after each Nunez goal.

List of international goals scored by Matt Nunez
No.	Date	Venue	Opponent	Score	Result	Competition	Ref.
1	February 12, 2016	United States Olympic Training Center, Colorado Springs, Colorado, United States	Jamaica	17–1	27–1	2016 World Floorball Championships qualifying	

== Honors ==
Lonestar Lions

- Southwest US Floorball Championship: 2015
- Lonestar Invitational Floorball Tournament (LIFT): 2015

Individual

- All-Tournament Team, Lonestar Invitational Floorball Tournament (LIFT): 2015
