= Innebandymagazinet Award =

The Innebandymagazinet Award (also the Golden Floorball Award) is a poll for the best floorball player in the world, announced annually by the Swedish floorball magazine Innebandymagazinet. The rankings, compiled based on the poll, include the top ten male and ten female players for the calendar year. The poll has been voted on by national team coaches, journalists and experts since 2005.

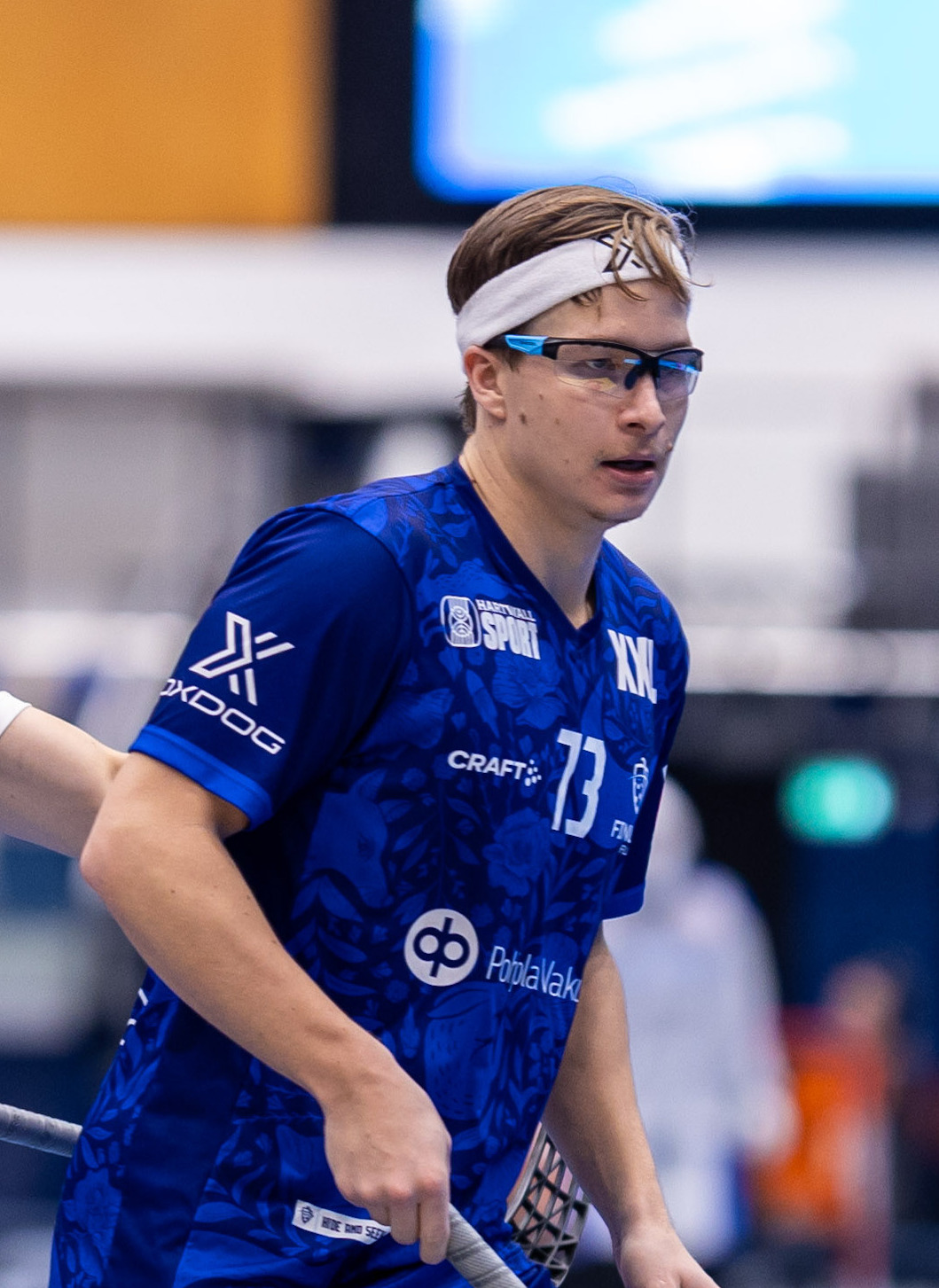
2024 winner Justus Kainulainen

In the 21 editions held so far, eleven different players have won in the men's category, with the most recent winner being Swede player Sakarias Ulriksson in 2025. Swedish floorball players have finished in first place a total of fourteen times. In the remaining years, it was Finnish players, among whom Mika Kohonen holds the record with five wins.

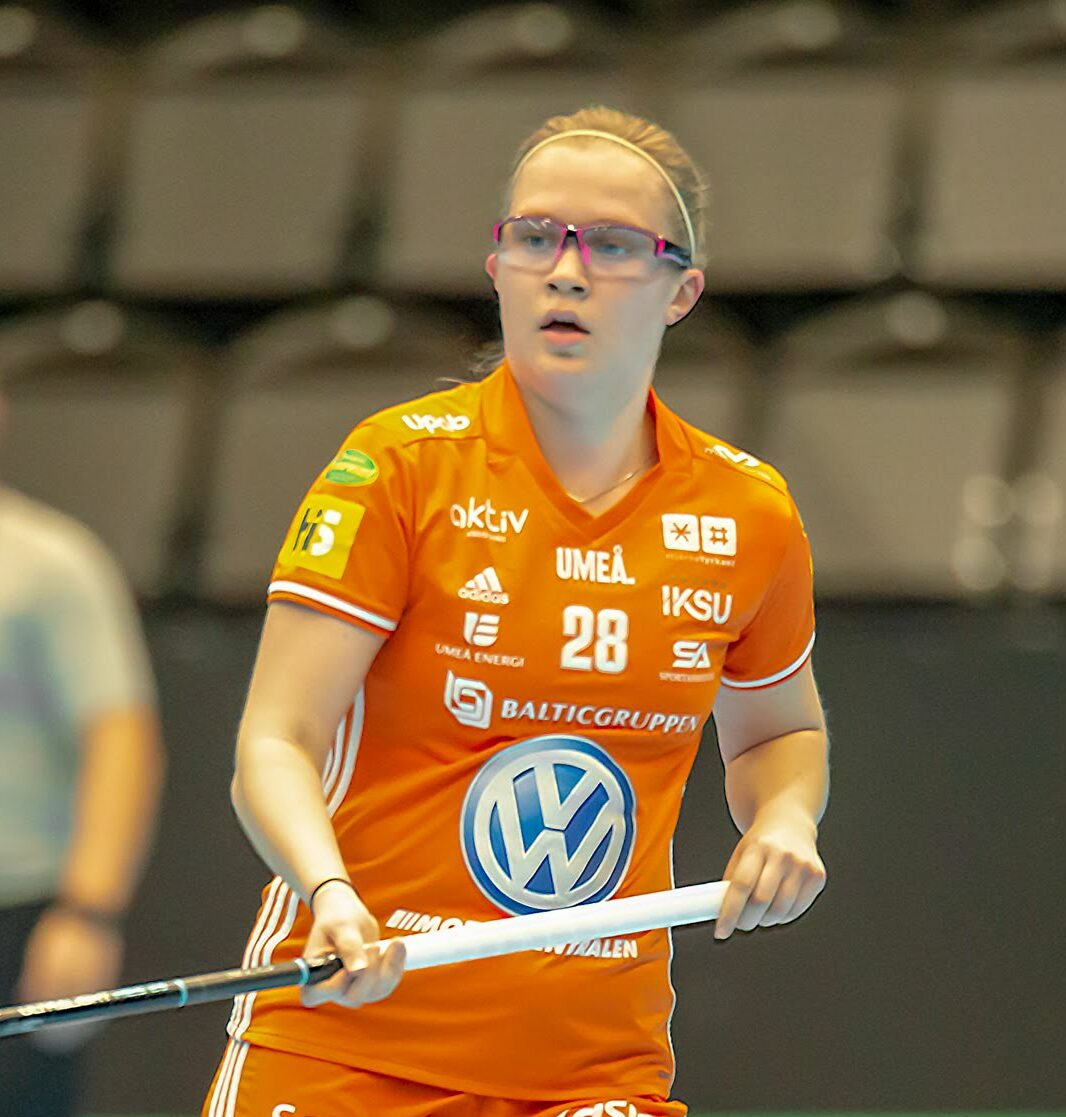
The winner of the poll for 2025 and the overall five-time winner, Veera Kauppi.

In the 19 editions held so far in the women's category, nine different players have won, with the most recent winner being Finn Veera Kauppi in 2025, who claimed a record fifth victory. Overall, Swedish floorball players are the most successful, finishing in first place twelve times. Among Finns, only Kauppi has won. Swiss Simone Berner and Czech Eliška Krupnová each have one victory.

== History of the poll ==
The poll was first announced for the calendar year 2005, initially only in the men's category. For the following few years, the best players of the completed season were selected. Since 2010, the voting has returned to being for the calendar year.

In the women's category, voting was held for the first time in the 2007.

In the first three editions, the top 15 players were announced; after that, only the top 10 were published.

== The best male players ==
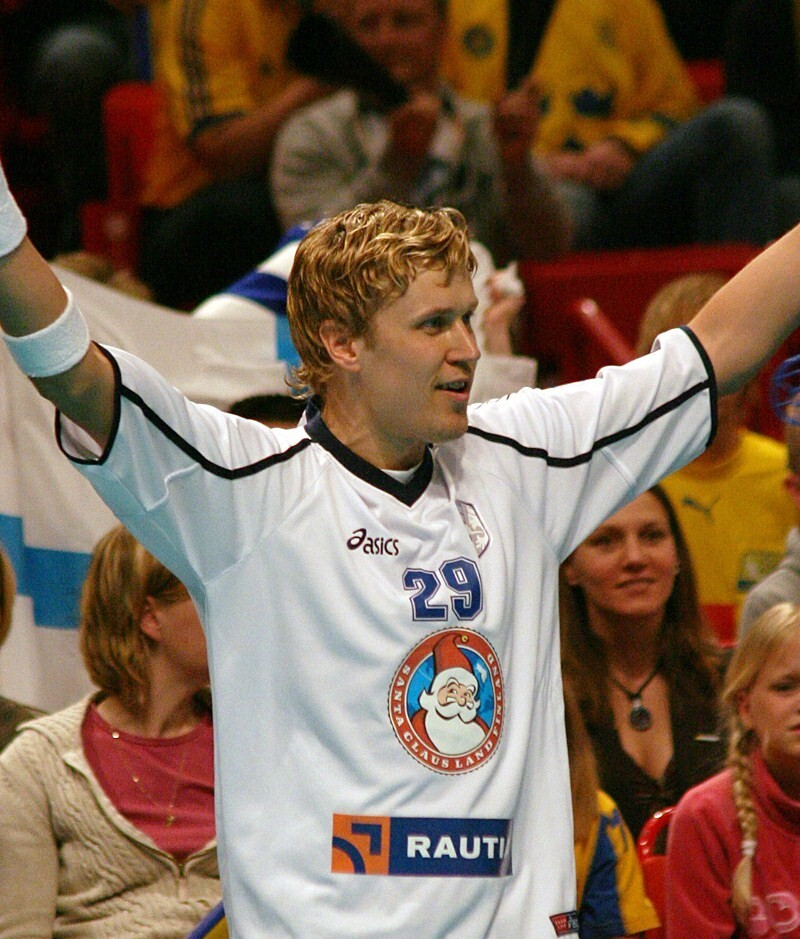
Five-time winner Mika Kohonen

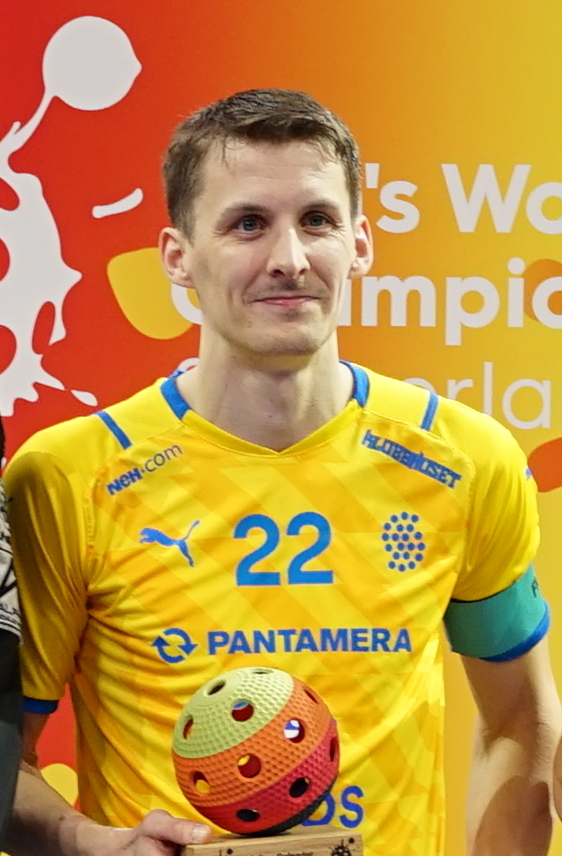
Three-time winner Emil Johansson

- 2005: Mika Kohonen (Finland)
- 2006: Anders Hellgård (Sweden)
- 2007: Anders Hellgård (Sweden)
- 2008: Magnus Svensson (Sweden)
- 2009: Mika Kohonen (Finland)
- 2010: Mika Kohonen (Finland)
- 2011: Mika Kohonen (Finland)
- 2012: Mika Kohonen (Finland)
- 2013: Rasmus Enström (Sweden)
- 2014: Kim Nilsson (Sweden)
- 2015: Rasmus Enström (Sweden)
- 2016: Alexander Galante Carlström (Sweden)
- 2017: Alexander Galante Carlström (Sweden)
- 2018: Eero Kosonen (Finland)
- 2019: Emil Johansson (Sweden)
- 2020: Kim Nilsson (Sweden)
- 2021: Tobias Gustafsson (Sweden)
- 2022: Emil Johansson (Sweden)
- 2023: Emil Johansson (Sweden)
- 2024: Justus Kainulainen (Finland)
- 2025: Sakarias Ulriksson (Sweden)

Multiple-time winners: 5× Mika Kohonen, 3× Emil Johansson, 2× Alexander Galante Carlström, Anders Hellgård, Rasmus Enström and Kim Nilsson

== The best female players ==
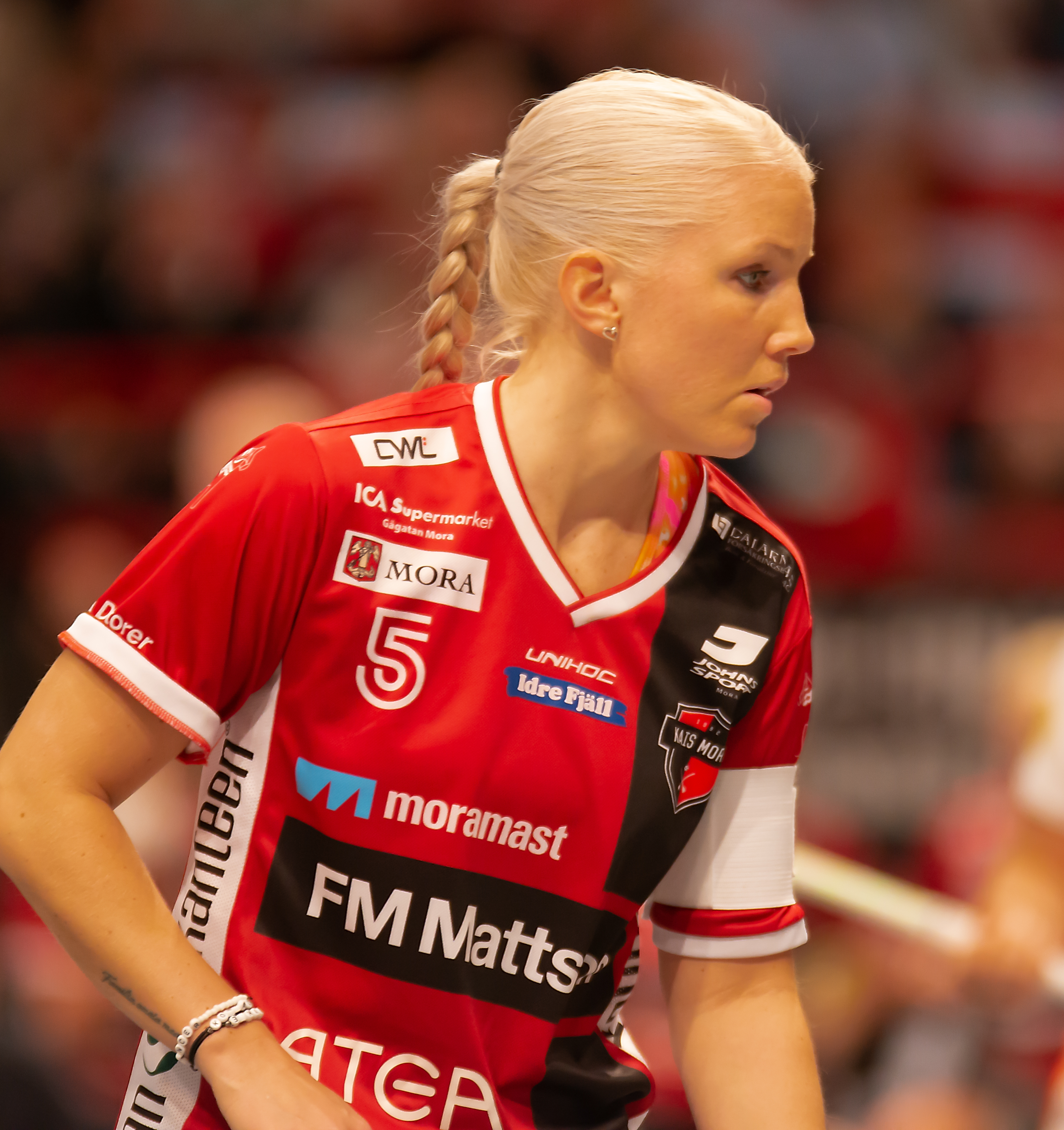
Four-time winner Anna Wijk

- 2007: Karolina Widar (Sweden)
- 2008: Simone Berner (Switzerland)
- 2009: Karolina Widar (Sweden)
- 2010: Hermine Dahlerus (Sweden)
- 2011: Emelie Lindström (Sweden)
- 2012: Emelie Lindström (Sweden)
- 2013: Emelie Lindström (Sweden)
- 2014: Anna Wijk (Sweden)
- 2015: Anna Wijk (Sweden)
- 2016: Anna Wijk (Sweden)
- 2017: Veera Kauppi (Finland)
- 2018: Veera Kauppi (Finland)
- 2019: Anna Wijk (Sweden)
- 2020: Eliška Krupnová (Czech Republic)
- 2021: Veera Kauppi (Finland)
- 2022: Emelie Wibron (Sweden)
- 2023: Veera Kauppi (Finland)
- 2024: Maja Viström (Sweden)
- 2025: Veera Kauppi (Finland)

Multiple-time winners: 5× Veera Kauppi, 4× Anna Wijk, 3× Emelie Lindström, 2× Karolina Widar
