= Kim Nilsson (floorball) =

Swedish floorball player (born 1988)

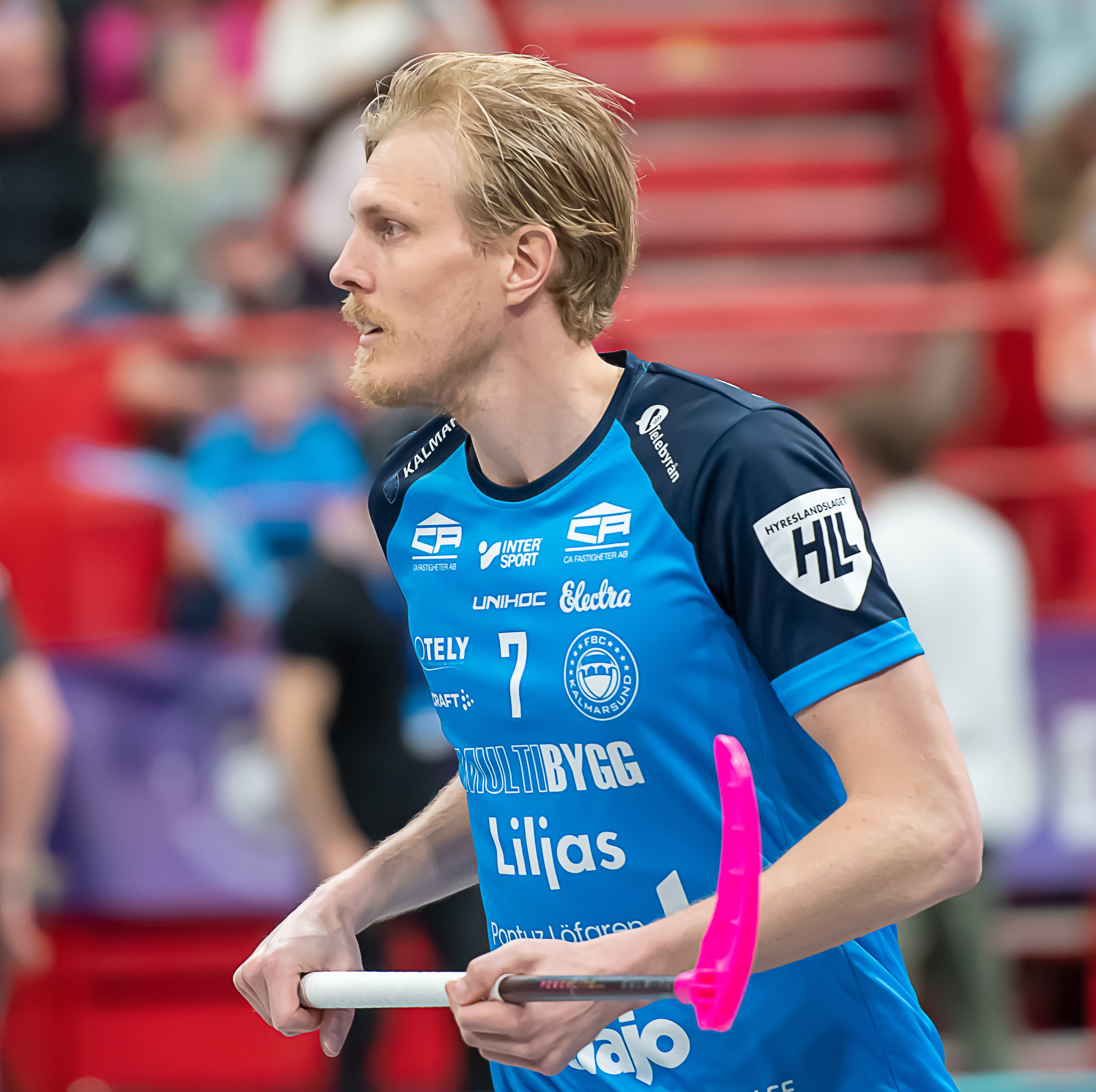
- Nilsson in the Swedish Super League final in 2021–22.

Personal information
- National team: Sweden
- Born: Kim Nilsson; 28 March 1988 (age 38) Kalmar, Sweden
- Height: 193 cm (6 ft 4 in)

Sport
- Sport: Floorball
- Position: Forward
- Shoots: Left
- League: Allsvenskan (2006–2007, 2025–); Swedish Super League (2007–2014, 2016–2025); National League A (2014–2016)
- Team: Färjestadens IBK (–2008); AIK (2008–2014); Grasshopper Club Zürich (2014–2016); FBC Kalmarsund (2016–2025); Vetlanda IBF (2025–)
Medal record
Representing Sweden
World Championships
Silver medal – second place	2010 Finland
Gold medal – first place	2012 Switzerland
Gold medal – first place	2014 Sweden
Silver medal – second place	2016 Latvia
Silver medal – second place	2018 Czech Republic
Gold medal – first place	2020 Finland
Gold medal – first place	2022 Switzerland
World Games
Gold medal – first place	2017 Poland
U-19 World Championships
Gold medal – first place	2005 Latvia

Kim Nilsson (born 28 March 1988) is a Swedish floorball player and former national team player. He is a four-time world champion, a champion of Sweden and Switzerland, a winner of the Champions Cup, and one of the greatest floorball players in history. He has been playing in the top leagues of Sweden and Switzerland since 2006.

== Club career ==
=== Färjestadens IBK and AIK ===
Nilsson began his floorball career at the age of six in his hometown with the club Färjestadens IBK (today's FBC Kalmarsund). Until the age of 16, he also played football. When he started playing men's floorball, his team earned two consecutive promotions between 2005 and 2007 – all the way to the Swedish Super League. In the 2006–07 promotion season, Nilsson broke the second division's record with 90 points. However, Färjestadens failed to stay in the Super League and was immediately relegated.

Nilsson then transferred to the team AIK, with whom he defended the Champions Cup and the league title in his very first season in 2008–09. He played five more seasons for AIK, during which they did not reach the final again. Twice they even finished outside the play-offs. Nilsson was the team's most productive player the entire time and also led the entire league in the 2010–11 season.

=== Grasshopper Club Zürich ===
In 2014, after two years of negotiations, he transferred to the Swiss National League A to the club Grasshopper Club Zürich, where he dedicated himself to floorball as a full-time professional for the first time, earning a global floorball record salary at the time of 100,000 francs per year. He helped Zürich win their first club title in the 2015–16 season as the league's most valuable player.

=== FBC Kalmarsund ===
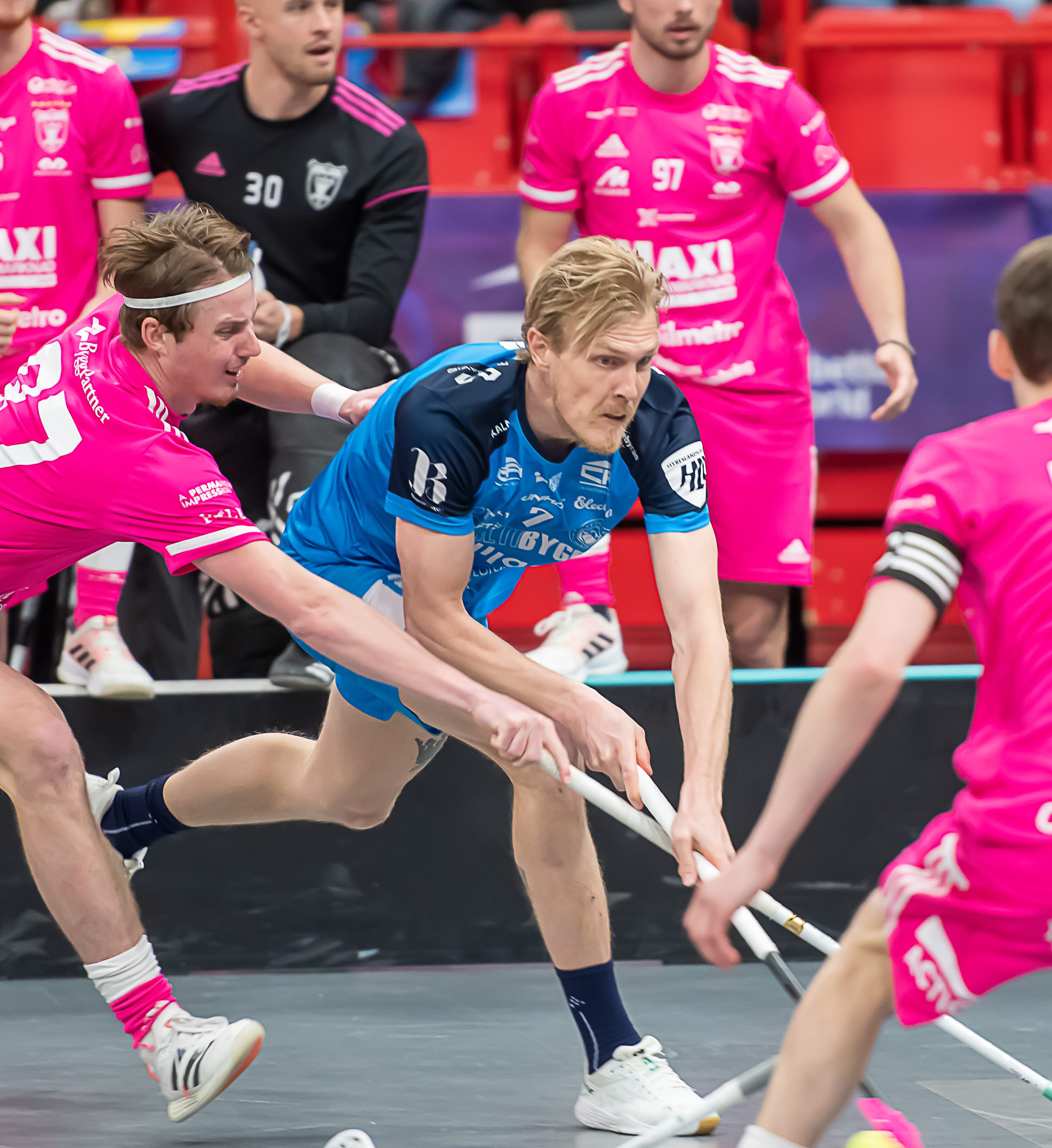
Nilsson playing for FBC Kalmarsund in the Swedish Super League final in 2021–22.

After his two-year contract expired, Nilsson was supposed to return to AIK in 2016. However, he was bought out of his commitment for a record 1.4 million Swedish kronor (almost three times the previous maximum) by his parent club Kalmarsund, for whom he began playing in the second highest division, Allsvenskan, also earning a record salary in Sweden. After two years, in 2018, he helped Kalmarsund advance to the Super League for the second time. At the time, he played on the team with his younger brother Adam. Kim played for Kalmarsund in the top flight for another seven seasons. In 2021, they reached the play-offs for the first time, falling in the semi-finals and winning bronze. They achieved their biggest success in the following 2021–22 season when they made it to the final, which they lost by a single goal.

In 2025, Nilsson ended his top-level career and continues to play in Allsvenskan for the team Vetlanda IBF, again alongside his brother.

== International career ==
Nilsson was nominated to the Swedish under-19 national team for the 2005 U-19 World Championship, where the Swedes won.

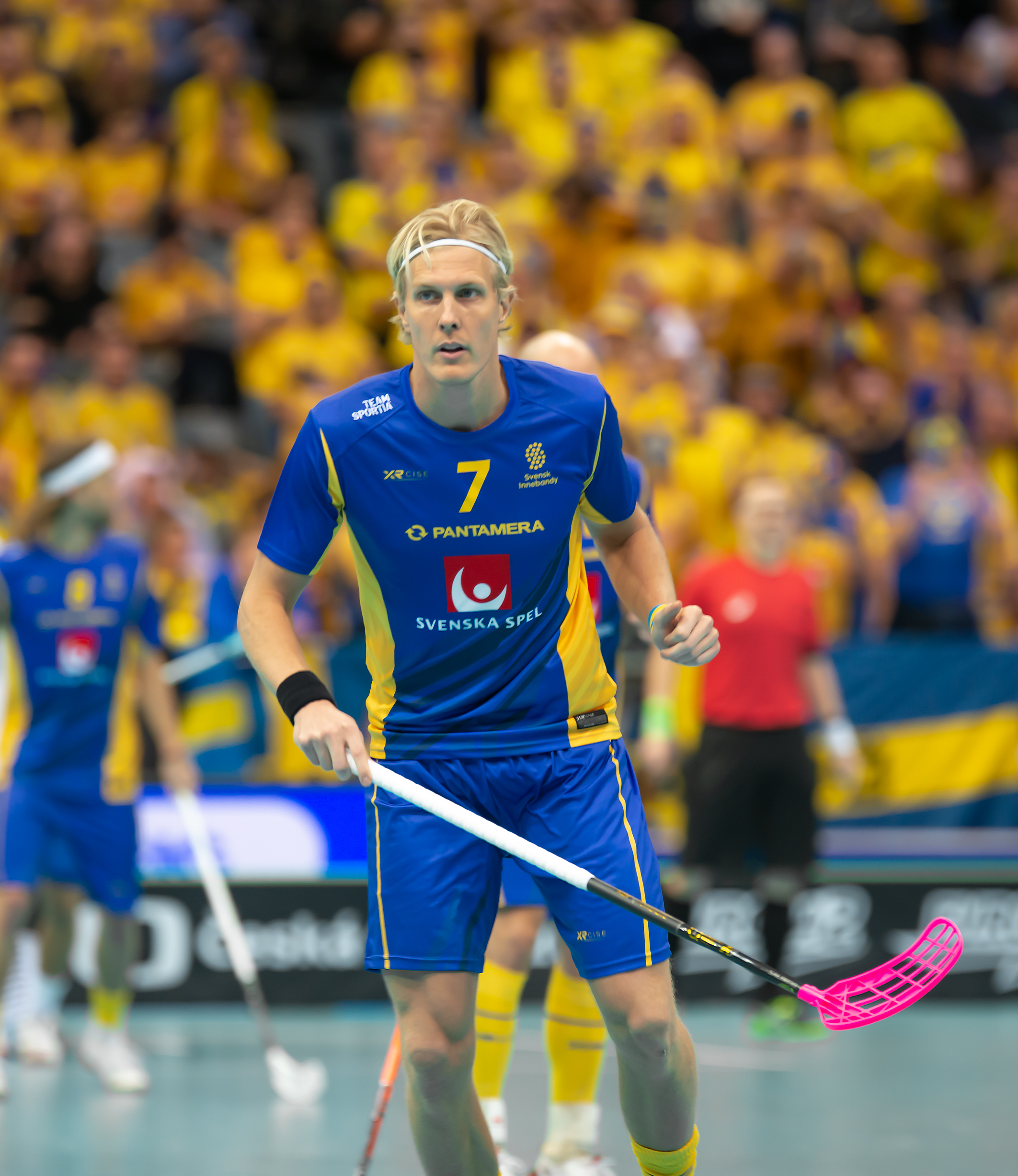
Nilsson in the final of the 2018 World Championship

He played for the Swedish men's national team at seven World Championships between 2010 and 2022. At the first of them, they lost to Finland in the final. But already in 2012, they won the world championship title, with Nilsson contributing as the tournament's top scorer and most valuable player, and a member of the All-Star team. Among other things, he recorded two goals and two assists in the final. He was named the most valuable player again at the next tournament in 2014, and was also selected for the tournament's All-Star team in 2018.

At the 2016 championship, he scored his 81st goal for the national team, breaking the record previously held by Niklas Jihde. Nilsson eventually extended this record to a final 123 goals. With 223 points, he is also the most productive player in the Swedish national team's history. At his last tournament in 2022, he tied the all-time record of 58 goals at the World Championships held by the Norwegian Willy Fauskanger. In total, he has four golds and three silvers from the World Championships.

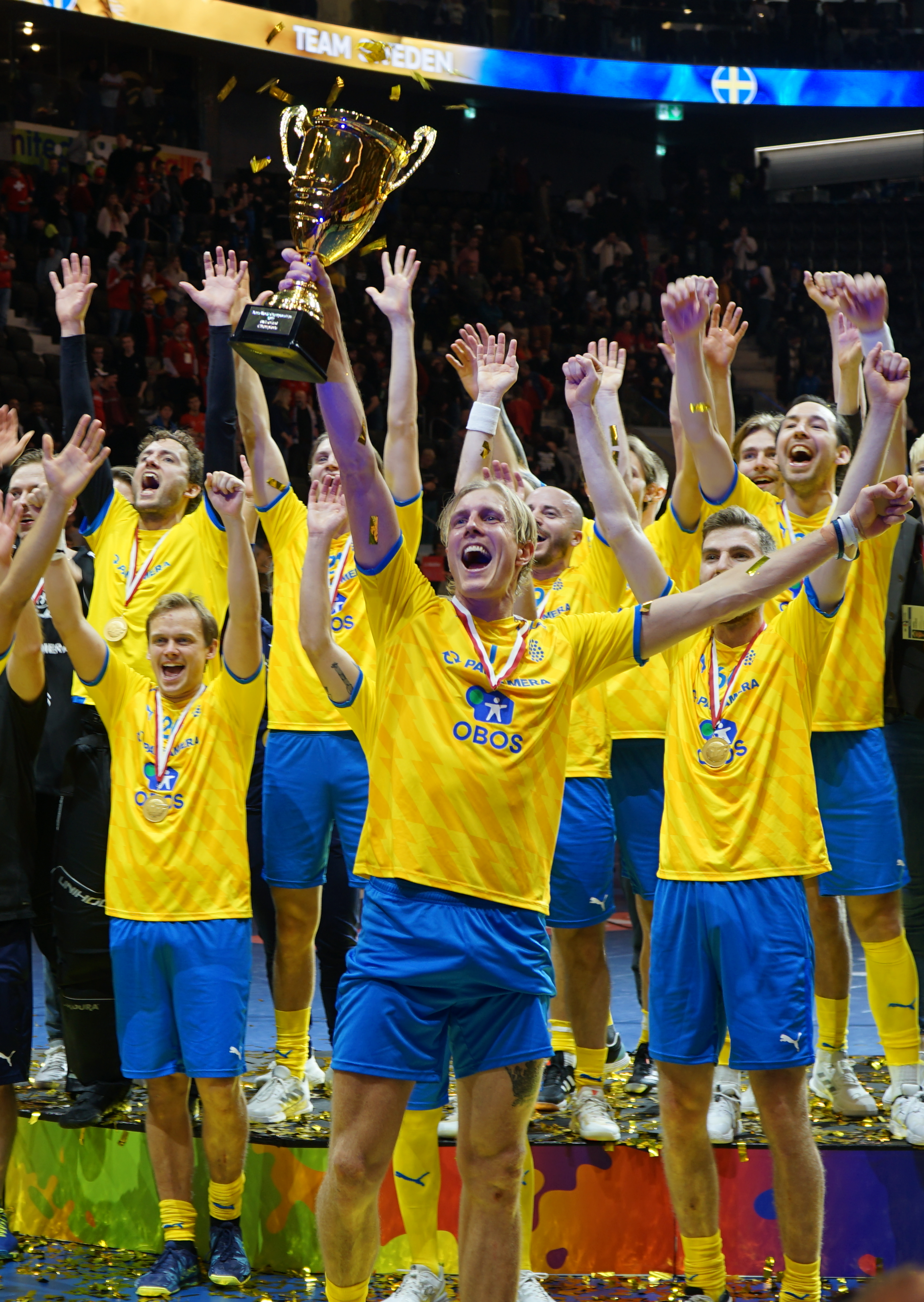
Nilsson with the trophy for the 2022 world champions

He also won gold at the World Games in 2017, where he scored the tying and winning goals in the final.

Year	Team	Event	Result
2005	Sweden U-19	WFC U-19	1st place, gold medalist(s)
2010	Sweden	WFC	2nd place, silver medalist(s)
2012	Sweden	WFC	1st place, gold medalist(s)
2014	Sweden	WFC	1st place, gold medalist(s)
2016	Sweden	WFC	2nd place, silver medalist(s)
2017	Sweden	WG	1st place, gold medalist(s)
2018	Sweden	WFC	2nd place, silver medalist(s)
2020	Sweden	WFC	1st place, gold medalist(s)
2022	Sweden	WFC	1st place, gold medalist(s)

== Achievements ==
- World's Best Floorball Player in 2014 and 2020 by Innebandymagazinet
- World Championships
  - World Championships titles: 2012, 2014, 2020, 2022
  - World Championships MVP: 2012, 2014
- Champions League
  - Champion: 2009
- Swedish Super League
  - Forward of the Year: 2010–11, 2013–14
  - Rookie of the Year: 2007–08
  - Champion: 2009
- National League A
  - Champion: 2016
- Allsvenskan Sodra
  - Forward of the Year: 2016–17
