= Sakarias Ulriksson =

Swedish floorball player

Personal information
- National team: Sweden
- Born: 25 July 2004 (age 22)

Sport
- Sport: Floorball
- Position: Forward
- League: Swedish Super League (Sweden)
- Team: Frötuna IBF (–2020); RIG Umeå IBF (2020–2023); Storvreta IBK (2023–)
Medal record
Representing Sweden
World Games
Gold medal – first place	2025 Chengdu
World Championships
Silver medal – second place	2024 Sweden
Under-19 World Championships
Gold medal – first place	2023 Denmark

Sakarias Ulriksson (born 25 July, 2004) is a Swedish floorball forward and national team player. He is a silver medallist at the 2024 World Championship, a two-time winner of the Swedish Super League, and the world's best floorball player of 2025. He has been playing in Swedish competitions since 2020.

== Club career ==
Ulriksson began playing floorball with Frötuna IBF. From the 2020–21 season, he played in the second-highest division, Allsvenskan, for RIG Umeå IBF, a club affiliated with a sports-oriented gymnasium.

In 2023, he transferred to Storvreta IBK and began playing for the club in the Swedish Super League. In his first season with Storvreta, the team successfully defended their league title. They repeated the achievement in the 2024–25 season, in which Ulriksson scored the winning goal in the Superfinal. It was his 19th goal of the playoffs, equalling a 24-year-old record held by Jonathan Kronstrand. In the regular season, he finished as the second-highest scoring player.

== International career ==
Ulriksson won a gold medal with the Swedish under-19 national team at the 2023 junior world championships. He finished the tournament as the top scorer, was selected to the All-Star Team, scored a goal and provided an assist in the final, and was named player of the match.

He made his debut for the senior national team at the 2024 World Championship, where Sweden finished second. He won a gold medal at the 2025 World Games.

Year	Team	Event	Result
2023	Sweden U-19	WFC U-19	1st place, gold medalist(s)
2024	Sweden	WFC	2nd place, silver medalist(s)
2025	Sweden	WG	1st place, gold medalist(s)

== Awards ==
In 2025, he was named the world's best floorball player in the Innebandymagazinet Award, becoming the youngest winner in the history of the award.
