= 2004 Men's World Floorball Championships C-Division =

Floorball competition

2004 Men's World Floorball Championships
C-Division

Tournament details
- Host country: Spain
- Venue: 1 (in 1 host city)
- Dates: April 21–25, 2004
- Teams: 7

Final positions
- Champions: Japan

Tournament statistics
- Matches played: 14
- Goals scored: 164 (11.71 per match)
- All statistics correct as of 04:21, April 13, 2009 (UTC).

The 2004 Men's World Floorball Championships C-Division took place over April 21 to 25, 2004 in Leganés, Spain.

The 2004 Men's World Floorball Championships were the first men's floorball championships that required a C-Division. Up until 2004, all teams played in just two divisions.

A Georgian team was scheduled to take part in the tournament, but withdrew due to problems obtaining visas from Spanish authorities.

== Championship results ==
=== Preliminary round ===
==== Group A ====
Team	Pld	W	D	L	GF	GA	GD	Pts
Japan	2	2	0	0	24	4	+20	4
Slovakia	2	1	0	1	8	10	−2	2
Malaysia	2	0	0	2	4	22	−18	0

April 21, 2004	Japan	7:3	Slovakia	Leganés, Spain

April 22, 2004	Slovakia	5:3	Malaysia	Leganés, Spain

April 23, 2004	Malaysia	1:17	Japan	Leganés, Spain

==== Group B ====
Team	Pld	W	D	L	GF	GA	GD	Pts
Canada	3	2	0	1	22	11	+11	4
Spain	3	2	0	1	13	9	+4	4
France	3	2	0	1	14	12	+2	4
Belgium	3	0	0	3	8	25	−17	0

April 21, 2004
Spain	5–4	Canada
France	7–4	Belgium
April 22, 2004
Belgium	3–13	Canada
France	4–3	Spain
April 23, 2004
Canada	5–3	France
Spain	5–1	Belgium

=== Placement round ===
==== 5th Place match ====
April 24, 2004	France	7:5	Malaysia	Leganés, Spain

=== Playoffs ===
Semifinals
A1	Japan	5
B2	Spain	4
B1	Canada	13
A2	Slovakia	8

Finals
A1	Japan	9
B1	Canada	4

==== Semi-finals ====
April 24, 2004	Japan	5:4	Spain	Leganés, Spain

Canada	13:8	Slovakia	Leganés, Spain

==== Bronze Medal match ====
April 25, 2004	Spain	11:5	Slovakia	Leganés, Spain

==== Gold Medal match ====
April 25, 2004	Japan	9:4	Canada	Leganés, Spain

== Standings ==
Official 2004 Rankings according to the IFF

Rk.	Team
1st place, gold medalist(s)	Japan
2nd place, silver medalist(s)	Canada
3rd place, bronze medalist(s)	Spain
4.	Slovakia
5.	France
6.	Malaysia
7.	Belgium

== See also ==
- 2004 Men's World Floorball Championships
- 2004 Men's World Floorball Championships B-Division

Men's World Floorball Championships C-Division
Preceded by No Previous; Championships	Host City; Leganés, Spain; 2004	Succeeded by San Lorenzo, Spain; 2006
