= Lisebergshallen =

Multi-purpose venue in Gothenburg, Sweden

Coordinates: 57°41′48.49″N 11°59′30.54″E

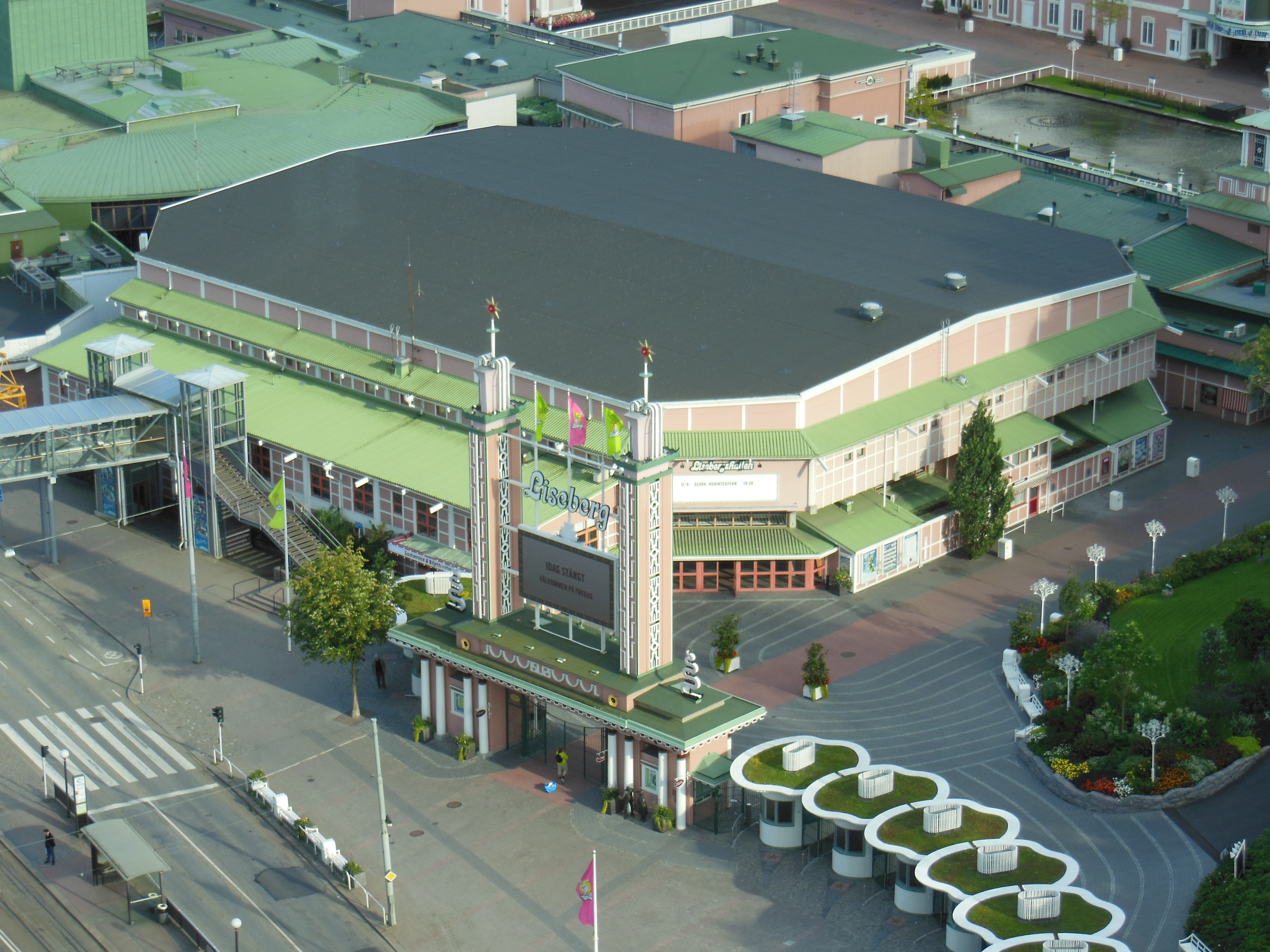
- Interactive map of Lisebergshallen
- Location: Örgrytevägen 5 Gothenburg, Sweden
- Capacity: Concert: 3,500

Construction
- Opened: 1980
- Demolished: 2019

Lisebergshallen was a multi-purpose venue in Gothenburg, Sweden. It was located at the entrance of the amusement park Liseberg. It was built in 1980 and was used as entertainment centre for sports competitions, charity events and concerts. In 2019, it was demolished. Samskolan uses the venue regularly every year at Christmas for their annual "Folkdans".

Handball team Redbergslids IK used Lisebergshallen as home arena.

The venue has hosted concerts for rock bands like Slayer, Alice Cooper, Europe, Joe Bonamassa, Manowar, Jethro Tull, In Flames, HammerFall, Kent, Motörhead, Nightwish, Helloween, Hardcore Superstar and Bullet for My Valentine. Melodifestivalen 1982, 1984 and 1987 was also held there.

Swedish heavy metal band HammerFall have performed at the venue many times and recorded their live album One Crimson Night at the venue on February 20, 2003.
