= Alejandro Núñez Allauca =

Peruvian composer and accordionist (born 1943)

Alejandro Núñez Allauca (born April 18, 1943) is a Peruvian composer and accordionist who performed outside of his native country.

== Biography ==
He was born in Moquegua, Peru on April 18, 1943, and first performed on the radio in Cerro de Pasco as a soloist on accordion at the age of nine. In 1955, he moved to Lima, where he studied music theory under the organist Manuel Cabrera Guerra. He studied cello in the National Conservatory of Music and at the Instituto Torcuato di Tella in Buenos Aires with Francisco Kröpfl, Gabriel Brncic and Gerardo Gandini. Between 1972 and 1973, he was a concert accordionist in the U.S. Since 1987, he has lived in Milan, Italy, and may be better known in Europe than in his own country. His 1995 piece, Sonrisa de Jesus, was performed at a Christmas concert in the Vatican.

His style was initially tonal, then moved toward pointillistic atonalism. Later, his work began to include ornamentation in a neo-Baroque style. His works exhibit a personal nationalism, incorporating elements of traditional Andean music as well as echoes of neo-Romanticism.

== Works ==
- Suite Koribeni for orchestra.
- Fisuras for two flutes.
- Salmo 100 for chorus.
- Trío para vientos (flute, oboe, bassoon).
- Salmo 100 for 8 soloists.
- Gravitación humana for magnetic tape.
- String quartet.
- El alba for chorus (1965).
- Diferenciales I y II for piano (1967).
- Variables for 6 and magnetic tape (1967).
- Cuarteto de cuerda nº 1 (1970).
- Concierto para orquesta (1970).
- Moto ornamentale e perpetuo for piano (1970).
- Sinfonía ornamental (1972).
- Ornamenti per 3 flauti e pianoforto Op. 3 (1973-7).
- Invention I, II, III and IV for orchestra (1978).
- Ornamentos for piano (1979).
- Movimiento ornamental for guitar (1980).
- Concierto ornamental for orchestra (1981).
- Cuarteto peruano (1981).
- Huatyacuri, ballet (1982)
- Cantata Bolívar for soloists, choir, and orchestra (1983)
- Rapsodia y Serenata for harp (1988)
- Aleluya del Alba for tenor, mixed chorus, and orchestra (1989)
- Wiesbaden Konzert for piano and orchestra
- Sonrisa de Jesús
- El Hijo del Sol (1997)
- Flor de Nieve for two singers and orchestra (1997)
- Missa Andina for soloists, choir, organ and orchestra (1997–98)
- Omaggio a Piazzolla (Milano, V - 1998)
- Canción del alma (1999, orchestrated 2003)
- La montaña de Luz for three singers and orchestra (1998)
- Koribeni for solo guitar
