= 2014 Men's World Floorball Championships =

Floorball competition

Tournament details
- Host country: Sweden
- Venues: 2 (in 1 host city)
- Dates: 5–14 December 2014
- Teams: 16

Final positions
- Champions: Sweden (8th title)
- Runners-up: Finland
- Third place: Czech Republic

Tournament statistics
- Matches played: 48
- Goals scored: 488 (10.17 per match)
- Attendance: 104,445 (2,176 per match)
- Scoring leader(s): (Denmark) Stefan Hedorf (16 points)

Awards
- MVP: (Sweden) Kim Nilsson

The 2014 Men's World Floorball Championships was the 10th edition of Men's World Floorball Championship. The tournament took place in Gothenburg, Sweden in December 2014.

Home team Sweden defended their title in a close game against Finland. Czech Republic earned the bronze after defeating Switzerland by 4–3.

== Qualification ==
For the first time, all teams, except for the host country, had to qualify for the Championships. A total of 30 teams took part in the qualification tournaments.

Host Qualified

	Date	Venue	Vacancies	Qualified
Host nation	10 December 2010		1	Sweden
European Qualification 1	29 January – 2 February 2014	(Poland) Łochów	2	Finland; Russia
European Qualification 2	29 January – 2 February 2014	(Slovakia) Bratislava	3	Switzerland; Estonia; Slovakia
European Qualification 3	28 January – 1 February 2014	(Netherlands) Nijmegen	3	Czech Republic; Denmark; Germany
European Qualification 4	28 January – 1 February 2014	(Latvia) Valmiera	2	Norway; Latvia
Asia-Oceania Qualification	29 January – 1 February 2014	(New Zealand) Wellington	3	Australia; South Korea; Japan
Americas Qualification	31 January – 2 February 2014	(Canada) Markham	2	Canada; United States
Total			16	

== Venues ==
Scandinavium	Lisebergshallen	Gothenburg is located in Sweden
Capacity: 12,044; Group A/B and playoff round	Capacity: 1,800; Group C/D and ranking matches	Gothenburg is located in Sweden

== Draw ==
The final draw for the tournament was held at Casino Cosmopol in Gothenburg on 25 February 2014. The teams were divided into four pots according to the world ranking. (World rankings shown in parentheses).

Pot 1	Pot 2	Pot 3	Pot 4
Sweden (hosts) (1); Finland (2); Switzerland (3); Czech Republic (4)	Norway (5); Latvia (6); Germany (7); Estonia (8)	Russia (9); Canada (11); Slovakia (12); Japan (13)	Denmark (14); Australia (17); United States (19); South Korea (20)

== Preliminary round ==
Team advanced to quarter-finals
Team advanced to playoff round
Team advanced to 13th–16th place playoff

=== Group A ===
Team	Pld	W	D	L	GF	GA	GD	Pts
Sweden	3	3	0	0	29	7	+22	6
Finland	3	2	0	1	18	8	+10	4
Latvia	3	1	0	2	8	21	−13	2
Germany	3	0	0	3	8	27	−19	0

6 December 2014; 12:30	Germany	2–9 (1–3, 0–2, 1–4)	Finland	Scandinavium, Gothenburg; Attendance: 2,103

	0–1	01:45 – R. Hyvärinen (R. Töllikkö)
	0–2	06:12 – J. Manninen (R. Töllikkö)
	0–3	17:11 – R. Hyvärinen (R. Töllikkö)
D. Mucha – 18:01	1–3
	1–4	25:28 – M. Lax (M. Kailiala)
	1–5	29:15 – N. Salo (E. Salin)
	1–6	40:42 – (PH1) T. Tiitu (M. Kailiala)
	1–7	47:35 – E. Salin (R. Töllikkö)
T. von Pritzbuer (B. Borth) – 48:34	2–7
	2–8	52:24 – J. Manninen (T. Väänänen)
	2–9	54:15 – T. Tiitu (M. Kailiala)

5
Shots
37

6 December 2014; 16:15	Sweden	11–2 (5–1, 6–1, 0–0)	Latvia	Scandinavium, Gothenburg; Attendance: 7,529

J. Samuelsson (K. Nilsson) – 00:23	1–0
	1–1	02:17 – A. Stepāns (J. Gribusts)
J. Svahn (J. Adriansson) – 07:32	2–1
K. Nilsson (P. Malmström) – 09:00	3–1
A. Carlström (A. Rudd) – 10:39	4–1
M. Samuelsson (R. Enström) – 11:19	5–1
H. Stenberg (A. Carlström) – 25:23	6–1
K. Nilsson (R. Nilsberth) – 26:12	7–1
	7–2	27:21 – A. Stepāns (I. Laiviņš)
J. Adriansson (M. Samuelsson) – 29:06	8–2
K. Nilsson (J. Samuelsson) – 30:53	9–2
M. Östholm (J. Samuelsson) – 34:08	10–2
R. Enström (M. Samuelsson) – 35:12	11–2

40
Shots
14

7 December 2014; 12:00	Finland	7–1 (3–0, 1–0, 3–1)	Latvia	Scandinavium, Gothenburg; Attendance: 2,479

M. Moilanen (J. Kukkola) – 03:00	1–0
L. Kapanen (J. Kivilehto) – 05:28	2–0
T. Väänänen (E. Salin) – 12:03	3–0
O. Hänninen (R. Hyvärinen) – 37:52	4–0
L. Kapanen (J. Kukkola) – 40:41	5–0
R. Hyvärinen (SV) – 41:14	6–0
	6–1	50:19 – (PP) A. Savins (A. Juškēvičs)
E. Salin (R. Hyvärinen) – 55:45	7–1

24
Shots
10

7 December 2014; 16:15	Germany	3–13 (1–3, 1–5, 1–5)	Sweden	Scandinavium, Gothenburg; Attendance: 7,097

	0–1	00:21 – K-J. Iraues (R. Nilsberth)
	0–2	01:31 – M. Östholm (P. Malmström)
	0–3	09:39 – K. Nilsson (K-J. Iraues)
D. Mucha (T. Böttcher) – 12:35	1–3
	1–4	21:50 – A. Rudd (R. Enström)
	1–5	25:32 – K. Nilsson (M. Östholm)
	1–6	26:18 – A. Rudd (R. Enström)
T. von Pritzbuer (B. Borth) (SV) – 27:49	2–6
	2–7	34:41 – (PP) R. Nilsberth (M. Östholm)
	2–8	39:50 – R. Enström (J. Adriansson)
	2–9	42:42 – R. Sundstedt (H. Stenberg)
	2–10	43:08 – A. Carlström (R. Nilsberth)
	2–11	43:38 – (PP) K. Nilsson (R. Enström)
	2–12	48:35 – A. Carlström (M. Östholm)
	2–13	54:42 – M. Wallgren (R. Enström)
S. Herlt – 55:43	3–13

23
Shots
45

8 December 2014; 19:00	Latvia	5–3 (0–1, 3–1, 2–1)	Germany	Scandinavium, Gothenburg; Attendance: 768

	0–1	05:17 – M. Mucha (P. Hühler)
A. Juškēvičs (A. Blinds) – 21:29	1–1
A. Jurševskis (M. Rajeckis) – 23:32	2–1
	2–2	32:26 – S. Herlt (R. Ibold)
A. Savins (A. Blinds) – 36:10	3–2
I. Laiviņš (A. Abramovs) – 49:49	4–2
	4–3	50:22 – B. Borth (T. von Pritzbuer)
A. Abramovs (A. Blinds) (ENG) – 58:38	5–3

24
Shots
22

9 December 2014; 19:15	Finland	2–5 (1–0, 1–2, 0–3)	Sweden	Scandinavium, Gothenburg; Attendance: 10,414

E. Salin (VO2) – 17:24	1–0
N. Salo (M. Kohonen) – 24:50	2–0
	2–1	25:12 – J. Samuelsson (H. Stenberg)
	2–2	35:11 – (PP) P. Malmström (K. Nilsson)
	2–3	54:18 – (SV) R. Enström (K. Nilsson)
	2–4	57:27 – A. Carlström (J. Svahn)
	2–5	58:34 – (ENG) K-J. Iraues (H. Stenberg)

14
Shots
26

=== Group B ===
Team	Pld	W	D	L	GF	GA	GD	Pts
Czech Republic	3	2	1	0	21	10	+11	5
Switzerland	3	2	1	0	19	12	+7	5
Norway	3	1	0	2	17	19	−2	2
Estonia	3	0	0	3	7	23	−16	0

6 December 2014; 19:30	Czech Republic	7–6 (4–3, 1–0, 2–3)	Norway	Scandinavium, Gothenburg; Attendance: 2,077

M. Jendrišák (J. Natov) – 02:51	1–0
T. Ondrušek (O. Mikeš) – 03:49	2–0
	2–1	10:46 – O. Olesen (K. Kronberg)
P. Dóža – 12:11	3–1
	3–2	18:44 – G. Evensen (T. Stræte)
P. Suchánek (M. Tokoš) – 19:07	4–2
	4–3	19:22 – O. Jansson (T. Rognlien)
P. Dóža (O. Mikeš) – 39:59	5–3
J. Curney (M. Podhráský) – 43:17	6–3
	6–4	50:46 – (VO1) K. Kronberg (O. Olesen)
	6–5	51:35 – O. Jansson
M. Tokoš (T. Sladký) – 55:41	7–5
	7–6	57:00 – K. Kronberg

22
Shots
29

7 December 2014; 18:30	Switzerland	7–3 (3–0, 3–1, 1–2)	Estonia	Scandinavium, Gothenburg; Attendance: 1,538

C. Hofbauer (E. Antener) – 01:07	1–0
M. Zürcher (P. Mendelin) – 01:30	2–0
S. Stucki (M. Engel) – 17:37	3–0
N. Scalvinoni (M. Hofbauer) – 32:00	4–0
M. Maurer (E. Antener) – 32:29	5–0
K. Schmocker (P. Mendelin) – 34:58	6–0
	6–1	37:47 – (PH1) M. Tamme (J. Thomsson)
	6–2	52:20 – M. Tamme (K. Kallion)
M. Tamme (OG) – 53:27	7–2
	7–3	59:35 – K. Kallion (R. Pass)

29
Shots
10

8 December 2014; 12:00	Norway	4–2 (3–0, 0–1, 1–1)	Estonia	Scandinavium, Gothenburg; Attendance: 1,567

O. Jansson (T. Stræte) – 03:27	1–0
G. Evensen (O. Jansson) – 05:21	2–0
C. Nilsson (S. Bjerknes) – 05:42	3–0
	3–1	34:14 – A. Wöiduma (P. Markus)
O. Jansson (O. Olesen) (PP) – 41:07	4–1
	4–2	45:41 – R. Pass

34
Shots
18

8 December 2014; 16:00	Czech Republic	2–2 (1–2, 0–0, 1–0)	Switzerland	Scandinavium, Gothenburg; Attendance: 2,413

	0–1	16:53 – (PP) C. Hofbauer (E. Antener)
	0–2	19:04 – (PP) N. Scalvinoni (C. Meier)
J. Curney – 19:30	1–2
M. Jendrišák (J. Curney) – 56:29	2–2

22
Shots
14

9 December 2014; 12:00	Norway	7–10 (1–1, 4–5, 2–4)	Switzerland	Scandinavium, Gothenburg; Attendance: 732

W. Fauskanger (D. Gidske) (PP1) – 11:40	1–0
	1–1	15:54 – Philipp Fankhauser (N. Scalvinoni)
	1–2	24:34 – (PH1) M. Gerber (E. Antener)
	1–3	24:46 – C. Meier (M. Zürcher)
	1–4	26:14 – F. Bolliger (M. Zürcher)
F. Kuchen (OG) – 26:23	2–4
	2–5	33:02 – E. Antener (M. Maurer)
W. Fauskanger (K. Kronberg) – 33:44	3–5
	3–6	37:15 – C. Hofbauer (M. Maurer)
W. Fauskanger (K. Kronberg) (PP1) – 39:47	4–6
W. Fauskanger (G. Evensen) – 39:55	5–6
	5–7	48:24 – (VO1) M. Zürcher
O. Jansson (O. Olesen) (PP1) – 49:14	6–7
	6–8	56:20 – (PB) M. Maurer
D. Gidske – 56:28	7–8
	7–9	59:17 – M. Maurer (F. Bolliger)
	7–10	59:48 – (PB) N. Scalvinoni (M. Zürcher)

21
Shots
30

9 December 2014; 16:00	Czech Republic	12–2 (4–1, 3–1, 5–0)	Estonia	Scandinavium, Gothenburg; Attendance: 1,834

=== Group C ===
Team	Pld	W	D	L	GF	GA	GD	Pts
Slovakia	3	3	0	0	28	8	+20	6
United States	3	2	0	1	23	7	+16	4
South Korea	3	1	0	2	7	28	−21	2
Japan	3	0	0	3	6	21	−15	0

6 December 2014; 18:00	Slovakia	9–4 (3–1, 2–2, 4–1)	Japan	Lisebergshallen, Gothenburg; Attendance: 399

	0–1	09:03 – N. Macuba (K. Higuchi)
L. Řezanina (M. Novák) – 13:20	1–1
M. Koščo (M. Kubovič) – 15:24	2–1
L. Gál (L. Řezanina) – 15:45	3–1
L. Gál (L. Ujhelyi) – 24:09	4–1
M. Grlický (M. Kubovič) – 26:05	5–1
	5–2	27:09 – N. Macuba (I. Ueda)
	5–3	37:22 – S. Kuraba
P. Pelegrín (J. Komínek) – 41:06	6–3
M. Kubovič (L. Gál) – 44:16	7–3
L. Řezanina (V. Komačka) – 45:24	8–3
J. Komínek (R. Zeliezka) – 57:56	9–3
	9–4	59:37 – Y. Hirokawa (I. Ueda)

35
Shots
16

7 December 2014; 11:00	South Korea	2–12 (0–2, 0–8, 2–2)	United States	Lisebergshallen, Gothenburg; Attendance: 364

	0–1	03:43 – (VO1) M. Binder
	0–2	13:25 – R. Aa (M. Hansen)
	0–3	21:00 – M. Rüegg (M. Hansen)
	0–4	21:19 – R. Brown (M. Vähä-Vahe)
	0–5	24:41 – (PP) K. Förare (J. Andersson)
	0–6	25:36 – (SH) M. Binder (M. Rüegg)
	0–7	27:06 – K. Förare (J. Andersson)
	0–8	27:26 – M. Rüegg (M. Hansen)
	0–9	39:31 – R. Brown (R. Möri)
	0–10	39:53 – (PP) R. Winkler
K. SeungHo (S. KyoungHoon) – 40:34	1–10
	1–11	49:01 – K. Förare (S. Zimmerman)
L. BaekHee (L. KiWung) – 54:20	2–11
	2–12	55:00 – S. Zimmerman (K. Förare)

9
Shots
32

8 December 2014; 10:00	Slovakia	15–2 (5–1, 4–1, 6–0)	South Korea	Lisebergshallen, Gothenburg; Attendance: 132

	0–1	06:44 – (PH1) L. JunOh (J. KwangHwan)
J. Komínek (M. Bulko) (PH1) – 11:13	1–1
M. Kubovič (J. Halás) – 11:22	2–1
V. Komačka (L. Gál) – 11:35	3–1
J. Komínek (P. Pelegrín) – 17:47	4–1
L. Řezanina (M. Hrín) – 19:07	5–1
V. Komačka (L. Gál) (PH1) – 29:52	6–1
M. Joščák (R. Zeliezka) (PH1) – 30:47	7–1
M. Joščák (J. Komínek) (PH1) – 34:20	8–1
M. Kubovič (M. Grlický) (VO1) – 37:14	9–1
	9–2	38:57 – S. JongSuk (L. BaekHee)
M. Joščák (L. Řezanina) – 40:58	10–2
L. Gál (L. Řezanina) – 43:30	11–2
M. Novák (J. Konečný) – 52:50	12–2
J. Konečný (M. Petróci) – 57:25	13–2
M. Koščo (M. Grlický) – 58:15	14–2
J. Komínek (P. Pelegrín) – 59:31	15–2

45
Shots
9

8 December 2014; 13:30	Japan	1–9 (0–5, 0–0, 1–4)	United States	Lisebergshallen, Gothenburg; Attendance: 146

	0–1	01:09 – M. Binder (R. Aa)
	0–2	03:38 – S. Zimmerman (R. Winkler)
	0–3	07:56 – M. Hansen (M. Rüegg)
	0–4	19:29 – (PH1) R. Winkler (F. Länzlinger)
	0–5	19:46 – M. Fischer (R. Brown)
	0–6	49:03 – S. Zimmerman (J. Andersson)
I. Ueda (R. Nishii) – 49:46	1–6
	1–7	53:18 – M. Binder (A. McVey)
	1–8	54:36 – A. McVey (M. Hansen)
	1–9	58:18 – R. Brown (M. Hansen)

6
Shots
38

9 December 2014; 10:00	United States	2–4 (1–0, 0–4, 1–0)	Slovakia	Lisebergshallen, Gothenburg; Attendance: 297

K. Förare – 18:52	1–0
	1–1	22:17 – L. Řezanina (L. Gál)
	1–2	26:32 – M. Kubovič (M. Grlický)
	1–3	34:07 – P. Pelegrín (M. Bulko)
	1–4	34:23 – R. Möri (OG)
R. Winkler (F. Länzlinger) (PP) – 49:26	2–4

24
Shots
16

9 December 2014; 13:30	Japan	1–3 (0–0, 0–1, 1–2)	South Korea	Lisebergshallen, Gothenburg; Attendance: 176

	0–1	34:35 – L. BaekHee (S. JongSuk)
	0–2	43:51 – S. KyoungHoon
	0–3	50:11 – (PP) L. BaekHee (S. JongSuk)
N. Macuba (R. Nishii) – 53:10	1–3

27
Shots
24

=== Group D ===
Team	Pld	W	D	L	GF	GA	GD	Pts
Denmark	3	3	0	0	21	8	+13	6
Canada	3	2	0	1	18	16	+2	4
Australia	3	1	0	2	17	25	−8	2
Russia	3	0	0	3	18	25	−7	0

6 December 2014; 10:00	Australia	11–9 (5–4, 4–2, 2–3)	Russia	Lisebergshallen, Gothenburg; Attendance: 344

	0–1	02:14 – S. Yuryev (A. Sharapov)
C. Hammarlund (J. Veron) – 12:43	1–1
	1–2	13:16 – A. Sharapov (V. Garevskich)
T. Boteler (P. Pražan) – 13:27	2–2
	2–3	16:00 – P. Semyonov (I. Veshnyakov)
T. Boteler (S. Frazer) – 16:45	3–3
J. Monckton (N. Moran) – 17:47	4–3
T. Boteler (S. Frazer) – 18:15	5–3
	5–4	19:21 – A. Taldonov (A. Sharapov)
J. Veron (C. Hammarlund) (PH1) – 26:10	6–4
	6–5	26:24 – Nikita Bryn (D. Kurach)
M. Woods (T. Hardy) – 29:25	7–5
N. Moran (J. Veron) – 32:12	8–5
D. Poljakov (OG) – 37:50	9–5
	9–6	38:53 – A. Sharapov (S. Azov)
	9–7	41:26 – P. Semyonov (I. Vešnyakov)
N. Moran (J. Veron) – 42:39	10–7
N. Moran (J. Veron) (PH1) – 46:32	11–7
	11–8	56:12 – (PP) S. Azov (A. Taldonov)
	11–9	58:54 – (PP) S. Azov (A. Sharapov)

24
Shots
39

6 December 2014; 13:30	Canada	2–7 (1–2, 0–2, 1–3)	Denmark	Lisebergshallen, Gothenburg; Attendance: 486

C. Haigh (J. Inouye) – 06:25	1–0
	1–1	15:25 – S. Hedorf (N. Jensen)
	1–2	19:13 – M. Krogsgaard (S. Jensen)
	1–3	24:07 – N. Jensen (S. Hedorf)
	1–4	34:43 – (SV) S. Jensen (C. Nisbeth)
B. Petrie (F. Kanji) – 43:03	2–4
	2–5	50:37 – B. Nielsen (J. Trolle)
	2–6	55:59 – (PH1) S. Hedorf (M. Erichsen)
	2–7	58:25 – S. Hedorf (C. Nisbeth)

21
Shots
40

7 December 2014; 13:30	Denmark	5–1 (1–1, 1–0, 3–0)	Russia	Lisebergshallen, Gothenburg; Attendance: 458

N. Jensen (S. Hedorf) – 02:35	1–0
	1–1	09:40 – N. Bryn (D. Kurach)
N. Jensen (M. Erichsen) (PH1) – 35:00	2–1
S. Hedorf (N. Jensen) – 47:16	3–1
B. Nielsen (S. Hedorf) (PH1) – 54:07	4–1
S. Jensen (J. Andersen) – 56:52	5–1

24
Shots
15

7 December 2014; 18:00	Canada	7–1 (2–1, 1–0, 4–0)	Australia	Lisebergshallen, Gothenburg; Attendance: 421

A. Radjenovic (J. Inouye) – 01:00	1–0
	1–1	03:51 – (PH1) M. Poon (O. Diffen)
B. Petrie (J. Inouye) (PH1) – 19:52	2–1
J. Inouye (C. Smith) – 28:08	3–1
A. Radjenovic (S. Ridgewell) – 44:54	4–1
L. Hannelius (M. Smith) – 45:28	5–1
J. Inouye (S. Ridgewell) – 58:00	6–1
L. Hannelius (S. Ridgewell) (PH1) – 59:48	7–1

29
Shots
17

8 December 2014; 18:00	Russia	8–9 (3–2, 3–4, 2–3)	Canada	Lisebergshallen, Gothenburg; Attendance: 154

P. Semyonov (A. Taldonov) (PH1) – 05:21	1–0
A. Taldonov (S. Azov) – 06:23	2–0
	2–1	08:54 – (SV) L. Hannelius (M. Smith)
P. Semyonov (A. Karkumbajev) – 13:27	3–1
	3–2	15:07 – S. Ridgewell (J. Inouye)
	3–3	23:34 – L. Hannelius (B. Petrie)
A. Sharapov (V. Garevskich) (PH1) – 26:11	4–3
	4–4	26:33 – J. Inouye (A. Radjenovic)
	4–5	29:56 – C. Haigh (M. Smith)
I. Veshnyakov (A. Karkumbayev) – 30:59	5–5
P. Semyonov (A. Shutichin) – 33:41	6–5
	6–6	38:40 – (PH1) L. Hannelius (J. Inouye)
	6–7	41:25 – S. Ridgewell
	6–8	47:31 – E. Ulli-Vanasse (B. Petrie)
	6–9	51:25 – J. Inouye (ts.)
A. Sharapov (S. Azov) (VO1) – 51:53	7–9
A. Taldonov (A. Sharapov) – 59:49	8–9

27
Shots
39

9 December 2014; 18:00	Denmark	9–5 (2–0, 2–3, 5–2)	Australia	Lisebergshallen, Gothenburg; Attendance: 216

A. Glad (B. Jensen) – 06:43	1–0
B. Nielsen (S. Hedorf) (PH1) – 13:12	2–0
	2–1	22:17 – J. Monckton (B. King)
K. Danielsen (E. Kristensen) – 30:33	3–1
	3–2	35:41 – O. Diffen (C. Hammarlund)
J. Andersen (E. Kristensen) – 36:10	4–2
	4–3	39:38 – T. Boteler
B. Nielsen (S. Hedorf) (PH1) – 45:33	5–3
S. Hedorf (M. Erichsen) – 46:29	6–3
	6–4	49:14 – S. Frazer (M. Woods)
C. Nisbeth (S. Hedorf) – 51:02	7–4
	7–5	52:13 – J. Monckton (B. King)
N. Jensen (S. Hedorf) – 56:23	8–5
A. Glad (B. Jensen) – 57:49	9–5

21
Shots
12

== Playoff round ==
Play-off; 10 December
Estonia	7
Slovakia	2
Latvia	10
Canada	2
Germany	3
Denmark	4
Norway	6
United States	2

Quarterfinals; 11–12 December
Sweden	17
Estonia	0
Switzerland	6
Latvia	1
Czech Republic	5
Denmark	1
Finland	6
Norway	1

Semifinals; 13 December
Sweden	10
Switzerland	1
Czech Republic	3
Finland	6

Final; 14 December
Sweden	3
Finland	2
Third place
Switzerland	3
Czech Republic	4

=== Play-off ===
10 December 2014; 10:00	Norway	6–2 (2–0, 1–0, 3–2)	United States	Scandinavium, Gothenburg; Attendance: 621

Game reference

W. Fauskanger (E. Evensen) – 17:47	1–0
O. Jansson (O. Olesen) – 18:37	2–0
S. Bjerknes (O. Jansson) – 26:57	3–0
O. Jansson (O. Olesen) (PP) – 41:00	4–0
	4–1	46:27 – R. Winkler (S. Zimmerman)
	4–2	50:38 – (PP) J. Andersson (R. Winkler)
O. Olesen (F. Eriksen) (VO1) – 53:03	5–2
W. Fauskanger (O. Olesen) (PP) – 54:28	6–2

23
Shots
15

10 December 2014; 13:00	Estonia	7–2 (2–1, 2–1, 3–0)	Slovakia	Scandinavium, Gothenburg; Attendance: 673

Game reference

V. Komačka (OG) – 08:09	1–0
P. Markus (F. Maalt) – 16:31	2–0
	2–1	18:46 – R. Zeliezka
R. Pass (V. Nurmi) – 22:11	3–1
J. Thomsson (A. Wöiduma) – 26:27	4–1
	4–2	33:45 – M. Kubovič
A. Wöiduma (P. Markus) – 49:37	5–2
V. Nurmi (P. Markus) (PB) – 58:57	6–2
M. Tamme (J. Kase) – 59:13	7–2

29
Shots
27

10 December 2014; 17:00	Latvia	10–2 (0–0, 4–1, 6–1)	Canada	Scandinavium, Gothenburg; Attendance: 1,327

Game reference

	0–1	24:31 – C. Haigh (B. Petrie)
A. Savins (A. Blinds) (PP) – 29:07	1–1
A. Belasovs (A. Blinds) – 30:21	2–1
A. Blinds (A. Abramovs) – 32:56	3–1
J. Gribusts (A. Raitums) (VO1) – 37:13	4–1
M. Krūmiņš (A. Stepāns) – 41:40	5–1
A. Stepāns (M. Krūmiņš) – 46:25	6–1
O. Fīrmanis (A. Rajeckis) – 49:21	7–1
A. Jurševskis (A. Blinds) (PP) – 51:49	8–1
	8–2	53:27 – L. Hannelius (M. Smith)
A. Raitums (A. Savins) – 59:01	9–2
A. Jurševskis (A. Rajeckis) – 59:54	10–2

35
Shots
17

10 December 2014; 20:00	Germany	3–4 PS (1–1, 1–0, 1–2)	Denmark	Scandinavium, Gothenburg; Attendance: 493

Game reference

	0–1	07:24 – S. Jensen
T. von Pritzbuer (T. Böttcher) – 14:59	1–1
M. Siede (D. Mucha) – 35:14	2–1
D. Mucha (M. Mucha) – 41:39	3–1
	3–2	57:21 – (PP) B. Nielsen (N. Jensen)
	3–3	57:45 – S. Hedorf (N. Jensen)

Shootout
3–3
3–3
4–3
4–3
4–3
4–3
4–3
4–4
4–4
4–4
4–4
4–5

25
Shots
25

=== Quarterfinals ===
11 December 2014; 15:30	Finland	6–1 (3–0, 0–0, 3–1)	Norway	Scandinavium, Gothenburg; Attendance: 2,112

Game reference

J. Kukkola (J. Kivilehto) – 08:30	1–0
L. Kapanen (J. Kukkola) – 12:07	2–0
L. Kapanen (M. Moilanen) – 19:03	3–0
	3–1	44:20 – K. Kronberg
R. Hyvärinen (E. Salin) – 49:05	4–1
O. Hänninen (E. Salin) – 56:51	5–1
M. Kohonen (K. Koskelainen) – 59:55	6–1

19
Shots
14

11 December 2014; 19:00	Sweden	17–0 (3–0, 6–0, 8–0)	Estonia	Scandinavium, Gothenburg; Attendance: 2,968

Game reference

M. Wallgren – 08:16	1–0
J. Kanebjörk (A. Rudd) – 10:08	2–0
M. Östholm (K-J. Iraues) – 19:12	3–0
R. Enström (J. Samuelsson) – 21:10	4–0
K. Nilsson (M. Östholm) – 28:46	5–0
J. Svahn (H. Stenberg) – 30:36	6–0
R. Enström (A. Carlström) – 32:09	7–0
A. Karlsson (H. Stenberg) – 32:39	8–0
M. Wallgren (K-J. Iraues) – 33:49	9–0
P. Malmström (J. Samuelsson) – 40:52	10–0
R. Nilsberth (A. Carlström) – 42:02	11–0
R. Sundstedt – 42:27	12–0
J. Kanebjörk (H. Stenberg) – 47:35	13–0
J. Kanebjörk (J. Svahn) – 49:09	14–0
J. Adriansson (R. Sundstedt) – 50:48	15–0
M. Östholm (A. Carlström) (PP) – 53:56	16–0
M. Samuelsson (J. Adriansson) – 55:21	17–0

53
Shots
7

12 December 2014; 16:00	Czech Republic	5–1 (1–0, 4–1, 0–0)	Denmark	Scandinavium, Gothenburg; Attendance: 2,098

Game reference

P. Suchánek (L. Veltšmíd) – 11:52	1–0
M. Podhráský (M. Jendrišák) – 20:31	2–0
M. Tokoš (T. Sladký) – 25:41	3–0
M. Jendrišák (M. Deutsch) – 27:22	4–0
J. Jelínek (T. Ondrušek) – 31:57	5–0
	5–1	38:06 – B. Jensen (M. Krogsgaard)

35
Shots
8

12 December 2014; 19:00	Switzerland	6–1 (1–0, 2–0, 3–1)	Latvia	Scandinavium, Gothenburg; Attendance: 2,994

Game reference

M. Maurer (K. Schmocker) – 09:39	1–0
N. Scalvinoni (M. Engel) – 20:43	2–0
P. Fankhauser (K. Schmocker) – 26:06	3–0
P. Mendelin (F. Bolliger) – 53:21	4–0
A. Zimmermann (N. Scalvinoni) – 58:05	5–0
	5–1	58:37 – (PP) A. Jurševskis (A. Blinds)
A. Zimmermann (PB) – 59:03	6–1

21
Shots
11

=== Semifinals ===
13 December 2014; 13:00	Czech Republic	3–6 (2–3, 1–1, 0–2)	Finland	Scandinavium, Gothenburg; Attendance: 8,878

Game reference

T. Sladký (M. Tomašík) – 09:55	1–0
	1–1	10:51 – M. Moilanen (L. Kapanen)
J. Natov (M. Jendrišák) – 12:45	2–1
	2–2	15:27 – (PP) J. Kukkola (M. Kohonen)
	2–3	17:55 – M. Kailiala (T. Tiitu)
T. Sladký (M. Tokoš) – 31:20	3–3
	3–4	37:31 – M. Kailiala (N. Salo)
	3–5	47:43 – (PP) M. Kohonen (L. Kapanen)
	3–6	58:41 – (ENG) J. Kukkola

15
Shots
28

13 December 2014; 17:15	Sweden	10–1 (6–0, 3–1, 1–0)	Switzerland	Scandinavium, Gothenburg; Attendance: 10,779

Game reference

P. Malmström (K. Nilsson) – 01:55	1–0
R. Enström (J. Samuelsson) – 02:32	2–0
M. Östholm (R. Enström) (PP) – 06:04	3–0
K. Nilsson (R. Enström) (PP) – 11:23	4–0
A. Carlström (A. Rudd) – 15:33	5–0
K. Nilsson (M. Östholm) – 19:49	6–0
J. Adriansson (K-J. Iraues) – 22:45	7–0
	7–1	30:36 – (PP) M. Hofbauer (M. Gerber)
R. Nilsberth (H. Stenberg) – 35:37	8–1
M. Östholm (P. Malmström) – 37:10	9–1
R. Enström (H. Stenberg) – 47:00	10–1

22
Shots
14

=== Bronze-medal game ===
14 December 2014; 12:00	Switzerland	3–4 (2–0, 1–4, 0–0)	Czech Republic	Scandinavium, Gothenburg; Attendance: 9,148

Game reference

E. Antener – 1:13	1–0
P. Mendelin (M. Zürcher) – 4:10	2–0
	2–1	23:05 – J. Curney (M. Jendrišák)
	2–2	29:10 – M. Tokoš (P. Suchánek)
M. Hofbauer (N. Scalvinoni) – 30:42	3–2
	3–3	36:29 – P. Dóža (T. Sýkora)
	3–4	39:53 – (PH1) M. Jendrišák (M. Tomašík)

13
Shots
15

=== Final ===
14 December 2014; 15:30	Sweden	3–2 (0–2, 2–0, 1–0)	Finland	Scandinavium, Gothenburg; Attendance: 12,044

Game reference

Patrik Åman
Goalies
Eero Kosonen

	0–1	00:26 – J. Kukkola (J. Kivilehto)
	0–2	19:02 – R. Töllikkö (E. Salin)
M. Samuelsson (J. Samuelsson) – 21:02	1–2
R.Nislberth (K. Nilsson) (PP) – 37:22	2–2
H. Stenberg (J. Samuelsson) – 47:00	3–2

20
Shots
13

== Placement round ==
=== 13th-place bracket ===
Matches 13th–16th
10 December
Australia	4
Japan	2
10 December
South Korea	3
Russia	15

13th-place
11 December
Australia	4
Russia	11
15th-place
11 December
Japan	5
South Korea	4

==== Matches 13th–16th ====
10 December 2014; 13:30	Australia	4–2 (0–0, 3–0, 1–2)	Japan	Lisebergshallen, Gothenburg; Attendance: 112

J. Veron (L. R-Hills) – 23:17	1–0
P. Pražan (S. Frazer) – 28:41	2–0
G. Staindl (B. King) – 37:52	3–0
Timothy Boteler (T. Hardy) – 44:43	4–0
	4–1	56:58 – T. Akagami (R. Nishii)
	4–2	57:34 – I. Ueda

18
Shots
22

10 December 2014; 18:00	South Korea	3–15 (1–4. 2–7, 0–4)	Russia	Lisebergshallen, Gothenburg; Attendance: 110

	0–1	05:40 – A. Taldonov (S. Azov)
	0–2	10:00 – S. Iuryev (P. Semenov)
(J. Yeo) G. Park – 14:16	1–2
	1–3	15:08 – D. Kurach (V. Saransky)
	1–4	17:28 – A. Sharapov (V. Garevskih)
	1–5	22:12 – S. Dmitriev (D. Kurach)
	1–6	23:22 – A. Taldonov (A. Sharapov)
	1–7	23:58 – G. Suvorov (A. Sharapov)
(J. Shin) K. Lee – 27:00	2–7
	2–8	27:17 – A. Sharapov (G. Suvorov)
	2–9	27:43 – S. Iuryev (A. Karkumbaev)
	2–10	28:19 – A. Shurikhin (P. Semenov)
	2–11	30:52 – S. Azov (A. Taldonov)
(K. Yeon) B. Lee – 37:42	3–11
	3–12	40:32 – S. Iuryev
	3–13	48:14 – A. Karkumbaev (P. Semenov)
	3–14	49:27 – N. Bryn (D. Polyakov)
	3–15	51:49 – P. Semenov (D. Uglanov)

17
Shots
27

==== 15th-place match ====
11 December 2014; 9:30	Japan	5–4 OT (1–3, 2–0, 1–1)	South Korea	Scandinavium, Gothenburg; Attendance: 569

	0–1	03:43 – J. Lee (B. Lee)
	0–2	12:05 – B. Lee (K. Seo)
	0–3	17:18 – B. Lee (S. Kim)
(N. Shiba) I. Ueda – 19:20	1–3
(T. Akagami) N. Matsuba – 23:36	2–3
(T. Akagami) N. Matsuba – 30:18	3–3
	3–4	40:51 – H. Bae (N. Shiba)
(N. Shiba) S. Kurata (PP) – 51:52	4–4
(I. Ueda) S. Kurata – 61:02	5–4

24
Shots
26

==== 13th-place match ====
11 December 2014; 12:30	Australia	4–11 (2–4, 2–4, 0–3)	Russia	Scandinavium, Gothenburg; Attendance: 611

=== 9th-place bracket ===
Matches 9th–11th
11 December
United States	5
Germany	6
11 December
Canada	3
Slovakia	5

9th-place
12 December
Germany	7
Slovakia	5
11th-place
12 December
United States	5
Canada	4

==== Matches 9th–12th ====
11 December 2014; 10:00	Canada	3–5 (0–1, 2–1, 1–3)	Slovakia	Lisebergshallen, Gothenburg; Attendance: 101

11 December 2014; 13:30	United States	5 – 6 OT (1–1, 2–2, 2–2)	Germany	Lisebergshallen, Gothenburg; Attendance: 183

==== 11th-place match ====
12 December 2014; 14:00	United States	5–4 (0–2, 4–1, 1–1)	Canada	Lisebergshallen, Gothenburg; Attendance: 214

==== 9th-place match ====
12 December 2014; 13:00	Germany	7–5 (4–1, 1–3, 2–1)	Slovakia	Scandinavium, Gothenburg; Attendance: 471

=== 5th-place bracket ===
Matches 5th–8th
13 December
Estonia	1
Latvia	6
13 December
Denmark	2
Norway	6

5th-place
14 December
Latvia	4
Norway	3
7th-place
14 December
Estonia	2
Denmark	7

==== Matches 5th–8th ====
13 December 2014; 10:00	Denmark	2–6 (2–3, 0–0, 0–3)	Norway	Lisebergshallen, Gothenburg; Attendance: 748

13 December 2014; 13:00	Estonia	1–6 (0–1, 1–0, 0–5)	Latvia	Lisebergshallen, Gothenburg; Attendance: 180

==== 7th-place match ====
14 December 2014; 9:00	Estonia	2–7 (1–3, 0–1, 1–3)	Denmark	Lisebergshallen, Gothenburg; Attendance: 104

==== 5th-place match ====
14 December 2014; 9:00	Latvia	4–3 (1–1, 2–0, 1–2)	Norway	Scandinavium, Gothenburg; Attendance: 2,733

== Ranking and statistics ==
=== Final ranking ===
The official IFF final ranking of the tournament:

Gold medal	Sweden
Silver medal	Finland
Bronze medal	Czech Republic
4	Switzerland
5	Latvia
6	Norway
7	Denmark
8	Estonia
9	Germany
10	Slovakia
11	United States
12	Canada
13	Russia
14	Australia
15	Japan
16	South Korea

=== All-star team ===
- Goalkeeper: (Denmark) Mike Trolle Wede
- Defenders: (Finland) Tatu Väänänen, (Sweden) Martin Östholm
- Forwards: (Sweden) Rasmus Enström, (Finland) Jani Kukkola, (Sweden) Kim Nilsson
