= 2014 Men's World Floorball Championships qualifying =

Floorball competition

The qualifying for the 2014 Men's World Floorball Championships took part in early 2014. A total of 30 teams competed for fifteen spots. The final tournament was organized by Sweden in December 2014.

== Overview ==
Numbers in brackets show the ranking before the qualification started, which was based on results from the last two World Championships.

Europe 1	Europe 2	Europe 3	Europe 4	Asia/Oceania	Americas
Finland (2); Russia (9); Poland (10); Spain (24); France (25); Ukraine (–)	Switzerland (3); Estonia (8); Slovakia (12); Serbia (21); Belgium (26)	Czech Republic (4); Germany (7); Denmark (14); Austria (23); Netherlands (27); Great Britain (29)	Norway (5); Latvia (6); Hungary (16); Italy (18); Liechtenstein (28)	Japan (13); Singapore (15); Australia (17); South Korea (20); New Zealand (–)	Canada (11); United States (19); Jamaica (–)

== Europe ==
The qualification rules were as follows:

- The two best teams from each qualification group qualified
- The two best third placed teams qualified
  - The calculation of the best 3rd teams followed this order:
    - 1. Average number of points
    - 2. Average goal difference
    - 3. Average scored goals
    - 4. Drawing of lots

=== European Qualification 1 ===
Dates: 29 January – 2 February 2014
Venue: Łochów Arena, Łochów, Poland

Team	Pld	W	D	L	GF	GA	GD	Pts	Qualification
Finland	5	5	0	0	103	6	+97	10	Qualified for the 2014 Men's World Floorball Championships
Russia	5	4	0	1	46	28	+18	8	Qualified for the 2014 Men's World Floorball Championships
Poland	5	3	0	2	42	24	+18	6	Referred to the ranking of third-placed teams
Spain	5	2	0	3	20	34	−14	4	Missed out on the 2014 Men's World Floorball Championships
France	5	1	0	4	15	61	−46	2	Missed out on the 2014 Men's World Floorball Championships
Ukraine	5	0	0	5	9	82	−73	0	Missed out on the 2014 Men's World Floorball Championships

29 January 2014
Ukraine	4 – 6	France
Spain	1 – 10	Finland
Poland	4 – 8	Russia
30 January 2014
France	4 – 6	Spain
Russia	16 – 2	Ukraine
Finland	10 – 2	Poland
31 January 2014
Russia	9 – 2	France
Ukraine	0 – 38	Finland
Poland	7 – 3	Spain
1 February 2014
Finland	17 – 3	Russia
Spain	7 – 3	Ukraine
France	3 – 14	Poland
2 February 2014
Russia	10 – 3	Spain
Finland	28 – 0	France
Poland	15 – 0	Ukraine

=== European Qualification 2 ===
Dates: 29 January – 2 February 2014
Venue: HANT Aréna, Bratislava, Slovakia

Team	Pld	W	D	L	GF	GA	GD	Pts	Qualification
Switzerland	4	4	0	0	51	6	+45	8	Qualified for the 2014 Men's World Floorball Championships
Estonia	4	3	0	1	25	13	+12	6	Qualified for the 2014 Men's World Floorball Championships
Slovakia	4	2	0	2	25	20	+5	4	Referred to the ranking of third-placed teams
Serbia	4	1	0	3	12	28	−16	2	Missed out on the 2014 Men's World Floorball Championships
Belgium	4	0	0	4	5	51	−46	0	Missed out on the 2014 Men's World Floorball Championships

29 January 2014
Switzerland	20 – 0	Belgium
Serbia	3 – 6	Slovakia
30 January 2014
Estonia	7 – 2	Serbia
Slovakia	2 – 10	Switzerland
31 January 2014
Belgium	1 – 8	Estonia
Serbia	0 – 12	Switzerland
1 February 2014
Belgium	3 – 7	Serbia
Estonia	6 – 1	Slovakia
2 February 2014
Switzerland	9 – 4	Estonia
Slovakia	16 – 1	Belgium

=== European Qualification 3 ===
Dates: 28 January – 1 February 2014
Venue: Jan Massinkhal, Nijmegen, Netherlands

Team	Pld	W	D	L	GF	GA	GD	Pts	Qualification
Czech Republic	5	5	0	0	94	6	+88	10	Qualified for the 2014 Men's World Floorball Championships
Denmark	5	4	0	1	46	21	+25	8	Qualified for the 2014 Men's World Floorball Championships
Germany	5	3	0	2	40	17	+23	6	Referred to the ranking of third-placed teams
Austria	5	2	0	3	17	50	−33	4	Missed out on the 2014 Men's World Floorball Championships
Netherlands	5	1	0	4	21	75	−54	2	Missed out on the 2014 Men's World Floorball Championships
Great Britain	5	0	0	5	10	59	−49	0	Missed out on the 2014 Men's World Floorball Championships

28 January 2014
Czech Republic	15 – 1	Austria
Germany	3 – 4	Denmark
Netherlands	8 – 4	Great Britain
29 January 2014
Austria	2 – 10	Germany
Great Britain	0 – 27	Czech Republic
Denmark	13 – 4	Netherlands
30 January 2014
Great Britain	1 – 6	Austria
Czech Republic	12 – 3	Denmark
Netherlands	2 – 16	Germany
31 January 2014
Denmark	9 – 2	Great Britain
Germany	2 – 6	Czech Republic
Austria	8 – 7	Netherlands
1 February 2014
Great Britain	3 – 9	Germany
Denmark	17 – 0	Austria
Netherlands	0 – 34	Czech Republic

=== European Qualification 4 ===
Dates: 28 January – 1 February 2014
Venue: Vidzemes OC, Valmiera, Latvia

Team	Pld	W	D	L	GF	GA	GD	Pts	Qualification
Norway	4	4	0	0	66	10	+56	8	Qualified for the 2014 Men's World Floorball Championships
Latvia	4	3	0	1	37	15	+22	6	Qualified for the 2014 Men's World Floorball Championships
Italy	4	2	0	2	24	27	−3	4	Referred to the ranking of third-placed teams
Hungary	4	1	0	3	23	44	−21	2	Missed out on the 2014 Men's World Floorball Championships
Liechtenstein	4	0	0	4	7	61	−54	0	Missed out on the 2014 Men's World Floorball Championships

28 January 2014
Liechtenstein	2 – 8	Italy
Hungary	2 – 9	Latvia
29 January 2014
Norway	24 – 3	Hungary
Latvia	13 – 2	Liechtenstein
30 January 2014
Italy	3 – 11	Norway
Hungary	15 – 3	Liechtenstein
31 January 2014
Italy	8 – 3	Hungary
Norway	6 – 4	Latvia
1 February 2014
Liechtenstein	0 – 25	Norway
Latvia	11 – 5	Italy

=== Ranking of third-placed teams ===
Since the number of teams between the qualification groups differ, the group sizes were equalised by removing the results from the matches against the lowest placed teams in the larger-sized group before comparing the average results.

Team	Pld	W	D	L	GF	GA	GD	Pts	Qualification
Germany	4	2	0	2	31	14	+17	4	Qualified for the 2014 Men's World Floorball Championships
Slovakia	4	2	0	2	25	20	+5	4	Qualified for the 2014 Men's World Floorball Championships
Poland	4	2	0	2	27	24	+3	4	Missed out on the 2014 Men's World Floorball Championships
Italy	4	2	0	2	24	27	−3	4	Missed out on the 2014 Men's World Floorball Championships

== Asia–Oceania ==
The three best teams from the qualification group qualified

Dates: 29 January – 1 February 2014
Venue: ASB Sports Centre, Wellington, New Zealand

Team	Pld	W	D	L	GF	GA	GD	Pts
Australia	4	4	0	0	34	6	+28	8
South Korea	4	2	1	1	24	14	+10	5
Japan	4	2	0	2	14	19	−5	4
Singapore	4	1	1	2	18	29	−11	3
New Zealand	4	0	0	4	7	33	−26	0

29 January 2014
Australia	7 – 3	South Korea
Japan	6 – 2	New Zealand
30 January 2014
Singapore	3 – 6	Japan
New Zealand	1 – 12	Australia
31 January 2014
South Korea	4 – 4	Singapore
Japan	1 – 4	Australia
1 February 2014
South Korea	10 – 1	Japan
Singapore	8 – 2	New Zealand
2 February 2014
Australia	11 – 1	Singapore
New Zealand	2 – 7	South Korea

== Americas ==
The qualification rules are as follows:

- The two best teams from the qualification group will qualify

Dates: 31 January – 2 February 2014
Venue: Cornell Community Centre, Markham, Canada

Team	Pld	W	D	L	GF	GA	GD	Pts
United States	2	2	0	0	32	2	+30	4
Canada	2	1	0	1	33	6	+27	2
Jamaica	2	0	0	2	1	58	−57	0

31 January 2014
Jamaica	0 – 27	United States
1 February 2014
Canada	31 – 1	Jamaica
2 February 2014
United States	5 – 2	Canada
