= Canada men's national floorball team =

Canada Men's Floorball Team
- Nickname(s): Team Canada
- Founded: 2001
- Manager: Heather Hudson
- Coach: Iiro Romo
- IFF Ranking: 15th (2024)
- First game: (Canada) 5-5 (Japan); 19 Apr 2004
- Largest win: (Canada) 31-1 (Jamaica); 1 Feb 2014
- Largest defeat: (Canada) 1-29 (Czech Republic); 6 Aug 2025
Home colors	Away colors

The former logo of Team Canada.

The Canada men's national floorball team is the men's national floorball team of Canada, and a member of the International Floorball Federation (IFF).

Canada is ranked 15th in the IFF ranking, following their 16th and 12th-place finishes at the World Championships in 2024 and 2022. Their 11th-place ranking after the 2018 Men's World Floorball Championships ties the highest ranking achieved by the men's team at the World Championships.

Canada's main rivals in floorball include Japan, Australia and the United States.

The Canada National Team is organized by Floorball Canada.

== Roster ==
As of the 2026 World Floorball Championships Qualifier

Goalkeepers
Number	Player name	Club
39	Krystof Kasha	(Czech Republic) Black Angels
53	Kale Smith	(Canada) Cambridge FC

Defensemen
Number	Player name	Club
3	Isaac Kashino	(Canada) Cambridge FC
12	Stuart Bowden	(Canada) Ottawa Blizzard
14	Reed Hunsberger	(Canada) Ottawa Blizzard
19	Thomas Courtemanche	(Canada) Montreal FC
22	Justin Knight	(Canada) Ottawa Blizzard
50	Alex Jette	(Sweden) LiU AIF IBK
67	Eetu Lumiala	(Finland) Pirkkalan Pirkat

Forwards
Number	Player name	Club
7	Cedric Grenapin	(Canada) Ottawa Blizzard
8	James Daly	(Canada) Toronto United
9	Cameron Buck	(Canada) Ottawa Blizzard
13	Patrick Mahoney	(Canada) Cambridge FC
16	Nicholas Lankester	(Canada) Ottawa Blizzard
20	Steven Friedli	(Switzerland) Unihockey Limmattal
55	Tristan Walsh	(Finland) Nokian KrP
61	Matthew Smith	(Canada) Ottawa Blizzard
88	Brandon Barber	(Canada) Toronto United
91	Valtteri Viitakoski	(Finland) Nokian KrP

=== Team staff ===
- President - Heather Hudson
- Head coach - Iiro Romo
- Assistant coach - Oliver Teir
- Doctor - Deanna Field
- Chiropractor - Patrick Welsh
- Equipment Manager - Patrick Mcneill-Mckinnell

== Rankings and records ==
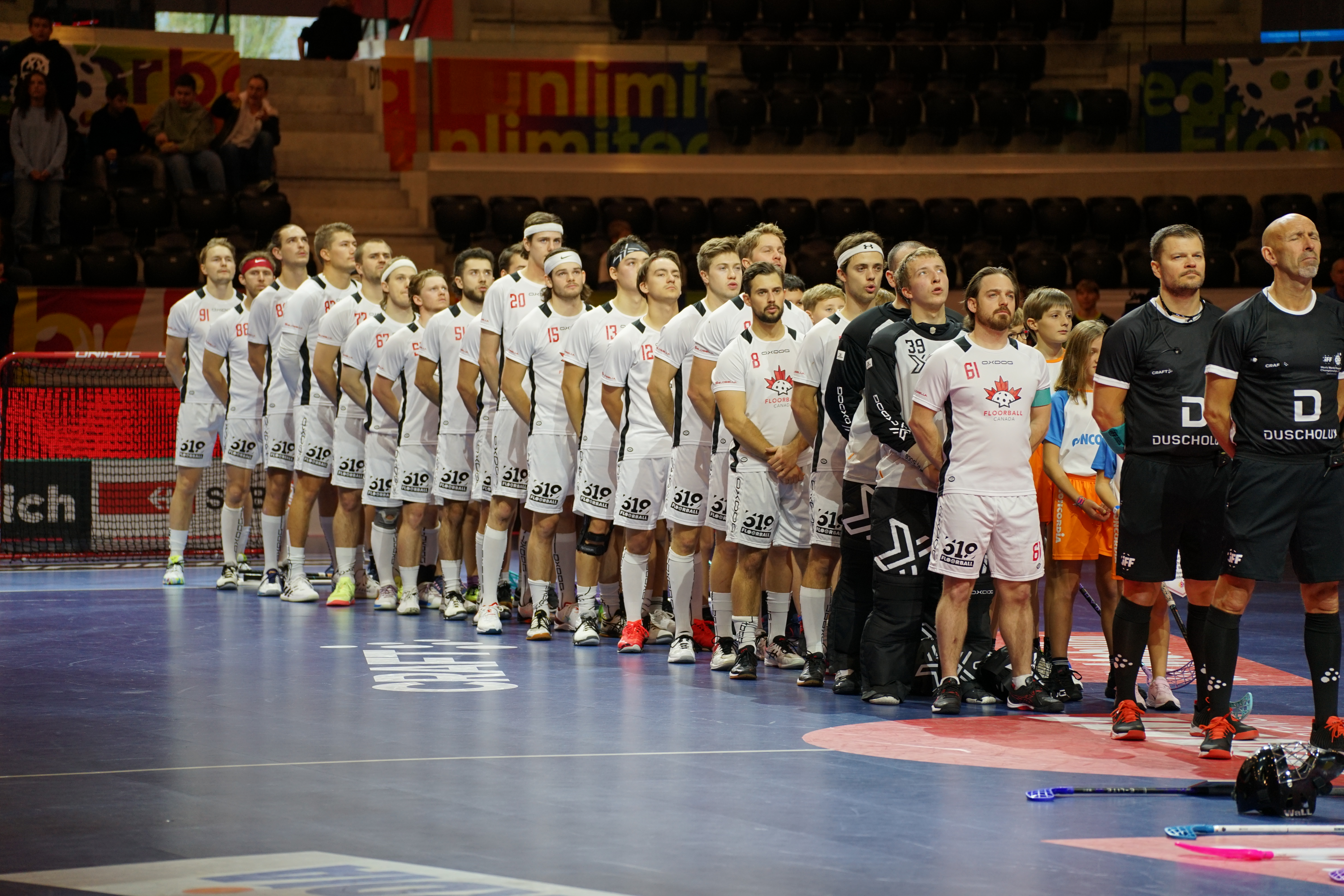
The Canada national team at the 2022 Men's World Floorball Championships.

=== World rankings ===
Year	Rank	Details	Change
2024	16th	16th Final Round	▼4
2022	12th	12th Final Round	Steady
2020	12th	12th Final Round	▼1
2018	11th	11th Final Round	▲2
2016	13th	13th Final Round	▼1
2014	12th	12th Final Round	▲1
2012	13th	13th Final Round	▼2
2010	11th	11th Final Round	▲12
2008	23rd	3rd C-Division	▲1
2006	24th	4th C-Division	▼3
2004	21st	2nd C-Division	NEW

=== All-time World Championship records ===
Year	GP	W	D	L	GF	GA	+/-
(Spain) 2004 C-Division	5	3	0	2	39	28	+11
(Spain) 2006 C-Division	5	2	0	3	30	24	+6
(Slovenia) 2008 C-Division	5	4	0	1	49	17	+32
(Canada) 2010 Qualifying	2	2	0	0	17	10	+7
(Finland) 2010 Final Round	5	2	0	3	25	40	-15
(United States) 2012 Qualifying	1	0	0	1	4	7	-3
(Switzerland) 2012 Final Round	5	2	0	3	25	61	-36
(Canada) 2014 Qualifying	2	1	0	1	33	6	+27
(Sweden) 2014 Final Round	6	2	0	4	27	36	-9
(United States) 2016 Qualifying	2	2	0	0	33	6	+27
(Latvia) 2016 Final Round	6	2	0	4	13	41	-28
(Canada) 2018 Qualifying	2	2	0	0	8	6	+2
(Czech Republic) 2018 Final Round	6	2	1	3	31	39	-8
(Finland) 2020 Final Round	6	2	0	4	41	73	-32
(United States) 2022 Qualifying	2	1	1	0	8	5	+3
(Switzerland) 2022 Final Round	6	2	0	4	36	58	-22
(Canada) 2024 Qualifying	2	2	0	0	26	7	+19
(Sweden) 2024 Final Round	5	0	1	4	23	37	-14
Totals	73	33	3	37	468	501	-33

=== Other international competitions ===
Year	GP	W	D	L	GF	GA	+/-
(Spain) 2004 Exhibition	2	1	1	0	10	6	+4
2007 Canada Cup	2	2	0	0	22	2	+20
(United States) 2012 Exhibition	1	0	0	1	7	8	-1
(United States) 2022 World Games	4	1	0	3	10	50	-40
2023 Iceland Invitational	2	2	0	0	15	6	+9
(China) 2025 World Games	4	1	0	3	20	66	-46
Totals	15	7	1	7	84	138	-54

=== Head-to-head international records ===
Opponent	GP	W	D	L	GF	GA	+/-
Australia	6	4	1	1	47	28	+19
Belgium	1	1	0	0	13	3	+10
China	1	1	0	0	15	1	+14
Czech Republic	2	0	0	2	1	46	-45
Denmark	3	1	0	2	12	19	-7
Estonia	5	0	0	5	18	68	-50
Finland	4	0	0	4	6	85	-79
France	3	3	0	0	25	12	+13
Germany	4	0	0	4	14	43	-29
Hungary	1	1	0	0	8	7	+1
Iceland	1	1	0	0	10	2	+8
Italy	1	1	0	0	7	4	+3
Jamaica	2	2	0	0	58	2	+56
Japan	4	2	1	1	29	18	+11
Latvia	4	0	0	4	9	49	-40
Liechtenstein	1	1	0	0	10	1	+9
Malaysia	1	1	0	0	5	1	+4
Philippines	2	1	0	1	16	12	+4
Poland	4	0	0	4	19	29	-10
Russia	3	1	0	2	21	30	-9
Singapore	4	3	1	0	23	17	+6
Slovakia	5	1	0	4	27	36	-9
Slovenia	1	0	0	1	4	8	-4
South Korea	1	1	0	0	12	0	+12
Spain	2	0	0	2	9	12	-3
Switzerland	1	0	0	1	1	12	-11
Thailand	2	2	0	0	14	8	+6
United States	19	12	1	6	119	76	+43
Totals	88	40	4	43	552	639	-87
