= Jorge Núñez Prida =

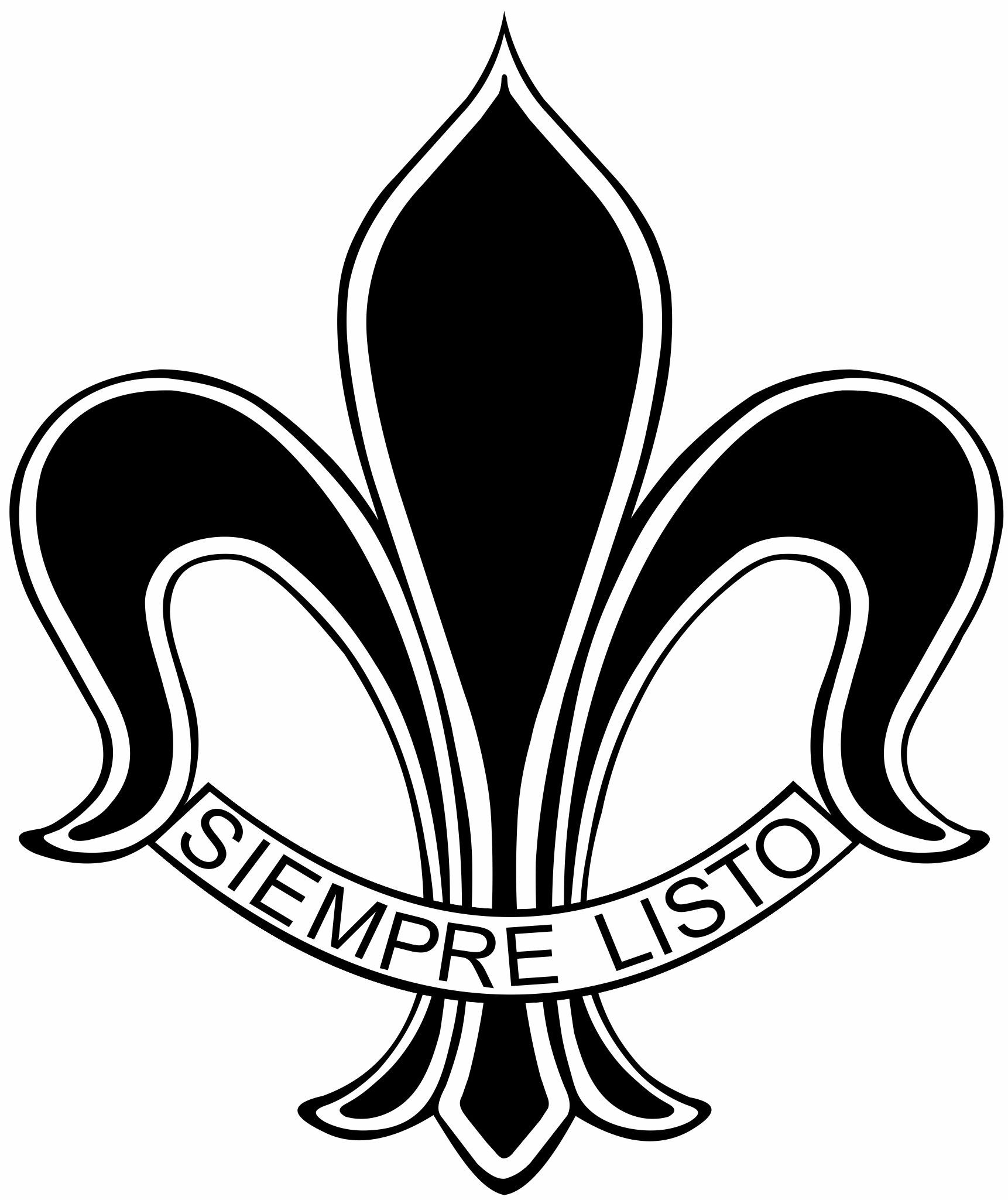
- Exploradores de México, 1931

Jorge Núñez Prida was a Mexican engineer and Scouting president, who carried out the best known official version of Scouting for Boys in Castilian Spanish under the guidance of the Inter-American Council on Scouting.

In 1926, a long internal conflict began in Mexico between the government of Plutarco Elías Calles and militias of laymen, priests and religious Catholics known as the Cristero War. One of the organizations involved was the Knights of Columbus, to which Nuñez belonged, and who along with other members supported and financed the armed struggle between 1926 and 1929 from his exile in the United States. Once the conflict with the government was over, Núñez returned to Mexico City. Throughout 1930, Edelmiro Traslosheros was dedicated to studying the predominant Scout organizations, and together with Núñez, begia to outline plans to found the Exploradores de México. In a private ceremony on November 1, 1931, in a mansion owned by Mrs. Refugio Golibar de Cortina, south of Mexico City in the direction of San Ángel, #2 Av. De la Paz, in the presence of the Archbishop of Mexico, Pascual Díaz Barreto, the boys of the Catholic schools were inducted into Scouting.

On July 1, 1934, in a daring maneuver the National Council of Scouts of Mexico announced the merger of the Cuerpo de Exploradores Nacionales de México and the Scouts de México to the International Scout Bureau in London, and Núñez paid the arrears of the Cuerpo de Exploradores Nacionales de México. The London response was to award the title "Asociación de Scouts de México" to this merger.

The title "Boy Scouts de Mexico" could not be used due to the legal suit between Jose Trinidad Padilla of Boy Scouts de Mexico, who had the title of name from 1930, and Núñez. Mexico was the only case at the time in which the Scout organization recognized by the London office did not carry the "Boy Scouts of ..." In 1934, Boy Scouts de México was an organization with more diffusion and members at a national level, including troops of Girl Scouts, as well as recognition by the Mexican government, whereas the now Asociación de Scouts de México, began an expansion process and open competition for more members. In 1943 the Scout organization was again renamed to its present name, Asociación de Scouts de México, A.C. under Juan Lainé Roiz.

The first Girl Guiding company came to have Guides of 13 nationalities, and enjoyed the friendship and support of the Scouts of Mexico under the presidency of Nuñez.
