= 2006 Men's World Floorball Championships =

Floorball competition

A-Division

Tournament details
- Host country: Sweden
- Venues: 3 (in 3 host cities)
- Dates: 21–28 May 2006
- Teams: 10

Final positions
- Champions: Sweden (6th title)
- Runners-up: Finland
- Third place: Switzerland

Tournament statistics
- Scoring leader(s): (Switzerland) Adrian Zimmermann

The 2006 Men's World Floorball Championships was the sixth World Championships in men's floorball. It was held in Sweden from 21 to 28 May 2006.

As in all previous Men's World Championships, Sweden won for the sixth time after defeating Finland in overtime in the gold medal game. The Sweden though failed to win all games for the first time in their history. Switzerland became the first team to accomplish a draw versus Sweden in a world championship game, and later won the bronze medal over the Czech Republic.

== Preliminary round ==
=== Group A ===
Team	Pld	W	L	D	GF	GA	GD	Pts
Sweden	4	3	0	1	47	8	+39	7
Switzerland	4	2	0	2	44	18	+26	6
Denmark	4	2	2	0	17	28	−11	4
Norway	4	1	2	1	20	32	−12	3
Germany	4	0	4	0	12	54	−42	0

May 21, 2006	Denmark	1–11	Sweden	Idrottens hus, Helsingborg

M. Andersen 23:09 (ES) / Goals / N. Jihde 17:31 (ES); M. Larsson 24:24 (PP); M. Olofsson 29:04 (PP); H. Quist 31:37 (PP2); J. Gustafsson 39:58 (ES); M. Svensson 40:20 (ES); A. Hedlund 40:59 (ES); F. Djurling 41:19 (ES); M. Larsson 49:44 (ES); F. Djurling 50:39 (ES); J. Berggren 51:56 (ES)

Norway	6–6	Switzerland	Idrottens hus, Helsingborg

W. Fauskanger 10:15 (ES); K. Kronberg 16:55 (PP); R. Evensen 23:05 (ES); T. Midtsveen 28:19 (PP); R. Evensen 39:51 (ES); T. Midtsveen 45:40 (ES) / Goals / J. Schneeberger 4:32 (ES); J. Krähenbühl 4:56 (ES); M. Zürcher 13:20 (ES); A. Cadisch 13:12 (ES); J. Krähenbühl 43:25 (ES); C. Hofbauer 53:42 (ES)

May 22, 2006	Germany	2–8	Denmark	Idrottens hus, Helsingborg

A. Gahlert 22:31 (PP); C. Fritsche 49:42 (ES) / Goals / C. Jensen 5:29 (PP); J. Schow 21:33 (BP); H. Engelsen 25:30 (ES); L. Jespersen 26:30 (ES); D. Berardino 31:21 (ES); M. Andersen 33:41 (ES); M. Erichsen 44:25 (ES); H. Engelsen 58:35 (ES)

Sweden	17–2	Norway	Idrottens hus, Helsingborg

C. Vesterlund 10:20 (ES); A. Hedlund 11:02 (ES); H. Quist 24:36 (PP); A. Hellgård 24:51 (PP); C. Vesterlund 25:26 (PP); C. Vesterlund 25:54 (PP); M. Olofsson 26:12 (PP); M. Olofsson 26:35 (PP); N. Jihde 28:50 (PP); N. Jihde 33:23 (PP); M. Olofsson 40:39 (ES); P. Fischerström 43:31 (ES); M. Olofsson 43:48 (ES); N. Jihde 54:08 (PP); A. Hellgård 56:23 (ES); A. Hedlund 56:57 (ES); A. Carlbom 57:10 (PP) / Goals / A. Sletten 39:57 (ES); G. Evensen 44:18 (ES)

May 23, 2006	Switzerland	22–5	Germany	Baltiska Hallen, Malmö

M. Hofbauer 2:42 (ES); M. Gerber 15:39 (PP); C. Hofbauer 17:46 (PP); D. Bill 18:39 (ES); A. Zimmerman 20:57 (ES); M. Zürcher 23:37 (PP); P. Bachmann 24:03 (ES); J. Krähenbühl 27:40 (ES); P. Bachmann 32:54 (ES); M. Gerber 35:10 (ES); S. Stucki 39:14 (ES); S. Stucki 39:59 (ES); A. Zimmerman 43:25 (PP); J. Krähenbühl 46:01 (ES); R. Gerber 46:24 (ES); M. Zürcher 51:04 (ES); M. Kaltenbrunner 52:57 (ES); S. Stucki 54:32 (ES); R. Gerber 56:32 (PP); S. Stucki 58:44 (ES); C. Hofbauer 59:37 (ES); A. Cadisch 60:00 (ES) / Goals / C. Fritsche 18:14 (ES); D. Mucha 47:22 (ES); D. Mucha 49:46 (PP); C. Fritsche 52:28 (ES); D. Mucha 57:53 (PP)

Denmark	5–3	Norway	Baltiska Hallen, Malmö

J. Schow 22:14 (ES); L. Jespersen 47:42 (ES); L. Olesen 48:11 (PP); J. Schow 55:29 (ES); D. Berardino 59:58 (PP) / Goals / W. Fauskanger 22:34 (PP); R. Evensen 33:35 (ES); K. Kronberg 37:09 (ES)

May 24, 2006	Switzerland	12–3	Denmark	Baltiska Hallen, Malmö

A. Zimmerman 10:05 (ES); M. Gerber 14:14 (ES); S. Stucki 19:20 (ES); M. Gerber 23:07 (ES); A. Zimmerman 23:35 (ES); C. Hofbauer 26:37 (ES); A. Zimmerman 38:01 (PP); P. Bachmann 42:02 (ES); M. Dysli 43:06 (ES); M. Gerber 50:04 (ES); A. Zimmerman 55:19 (BP); A. Cadisch 59:49 (ES) / Goals / C. Jensen 2:37 (ES); H. Engelsen 21:58 (ES); D. Berardino 22:12 (ES)

Germany	1–5	Sweden	Baltiska Hallen, Malmö

I. Penzhorn 49:01 (ES) / Goals / A. Hedlund 0:53 (ES); M. Larsson 6:30 (PP); J. Gustafsson 11:49 (ES); C. Vesterlund 19:45 (ES); J. Olofsson 21:03 (ES); M. Larsson 23:25 (ES); A. Carlbom 28:47 (ES); A. Hedlund 29:42 (ES); K. Kranberg 30:40 (ES); J. Berggren 31:04 (ES); J. Olofsson 50:28 (PP); J. Berggren 51:56 (PP); J. Olofsson 53:11 (PP); A. Carlbom 54:09 (PP); K. Nilsson 58:27 (ES)

May 25, 2006	Sweden	4–4	Switzerland	Baltiska Hallen, Malmö

N. Jihde 9:55 (ES); N. Jihde 13:29 (ES); P. Fischerström 39:51 (BP); A. Hellgård 53:46 (ES) / Goals / M. Zürcher 23:16 (ES); P. Bachmann 42:16 (ES); A. Zimmerman 42:28 (ES); S. Stucki 44:50 (ES)

Norway	9–4	Germany	Baltiska Hallen, Malmö

S. Skau 19:09 (ES); M. Olsen 19:33 (ES); L. Eide 22:06 (ES); K. Kronberg 22:19 (ES); A. Sletten 24:21 (ES); R. Evensen 30:31 (ES); K. Kronberg 39:07 (ES); K. Kronberg 55:08 (ES); T. Midtsveen 58:18 (ES) / Goals / A. Gahlert 6:24 (ES); A. Gahlert 21:41 (PP); M. Gaude 40:59 (ES); F. Hartwig 52:59 (ES)

=== Group B ===
Team	Pld	W	L	D	GF	GA	GD	Pts
Finland	4	4	0	0	50	6	+44	8
Czech Republic	4	3	1	0	26	13	+13	6
Latvia	4	2	2	0	21	26	−5	4
Italy	4	1	3	0	11	36	−25	2
Russia	4	0	4	0	12	39	−27	0

May 21, 2006	Italy	2–7	Czech Republic	Solnahallen, Stockholm

F. Terlizzi 2:17 (ES); F. Campese Olsson 12:33 (ES) / Goals / R. Cepek 5:40 (ES); R. Sikora 8:00 (ES); R. Sikora 8:00 (ES); A. Zalesny 11:53 (PP); P. Kozusnik 39:51 (ES); P. Kozusnik 52:49 (ES); D. Folta 53:24 (ES); R. Cepek 59:57 (PP)

Finland	12–2	Russia	Solnahallen, Stockholm

J. Hintikka 14:18 (ES); M. Järvi 17:35 (ES); T. Tiitu 23:24 (ES); T. Tiitu 32:37 (PP); L. Vänttinen 32:53 (ES); T. Tiitu 42:27 (ES); M. Järvi 45:23 (ES); V. Punkari 48:29 (PP); J. Hintikka 49:08 (ES); J. Lehtonen 50:01 (ES); L. Vänttinen 50:11 (ES); J. Lehtonen 58:09 (ES) / Goals / R. Druzininskiy 15:05 (ES); A. Sorokin 28:53 (ES)

May 22, 2006	Latvia	7–2	Italy	Solnahallen, Stockholm

I. Jekabsons 9:12 (ES); A. Belasovs 9:25 (ES); A. Blinds 13:02 (ES); A. Belasovs 13:58 (BP); J. Peics 21:30 (BP); A. Juškēvičs 57:07 (ES); J. Jansons 59:18 (ES) / Goals / P. Santoro 04:44 (BP); G. Amstutz 36:44 (ES)

Czech Republic	3–6	Finland	Solnahallen, Stockholm

M. Hanzlik 13:25 (ES); P. Kozusnik 16:13 (PP); P. Kozusnik 32:44 (BP) / Goals / P. Salminen 5:59 (ES); R. Laine 11:40 (ES); M. Kohonen 33:04 (PP2); P. Salminen 38:17 (ES); T. Tiitu 39:40 (PP); T. Tiitu 55:29 (PP)

May 23, 2006	Russia	6–10	Latvia	Solnahallen, Stockholm

R. Druzininskiy 11:43 (ES); R. Druzininskiy 22:56 (PP); A. Tyapkov 38:03 (ES); V. Gorshenenko 39:49 (ES); R. Druzininskiy 48:44 (ES); M. Bukin 49:10 (ES) / Goals / J. Peics 3:24 (ES); J. Jansons 4:39 (ES); J. Jansons 7:37 (ES); A. Blinds 8:31 (ES); A. Juškēvičs 17:54 (PP); J. Jansons 26:34 (PP); A. Blinds 35:04 (ES); A. Blinds 39:06 (ES); A. Juškēvičs 50:34 (ES); I. Laivins 58:35 (ES)

Italy	0–20	Finland	Solnahallen, Stockholm

Goals / J. Lehtonen 1:41 (ES); T. Kirjonen 4:37 (ES); S. Nyman 7:26 (ES); P. Salminen 10:50 (PP); E. Jussila 21:14 (ES); L. Vänttinen 23:13 (ES); L. Vänttinen 25:17 (ES); L. Vänttinen 25:50 (ES); S. Manner 26:08 (ES); E. Jussila 26:57 (ES); J. Lehtonen 29:23 (ES); T. Väänänen 30:49 (ES); J. Lehtonen 33:35 (ES); E. Jussila 37:29 (PP); L. Vänttinen 39:44 (PP); T. Kirjonen 45:19 (ES); L. Vänttinen 51:41 (ES); L. Vänttinen 53:06 (BP); T. Väänänen 58:18 (PP); J. Lehtonen 58:42 (ES)

May 24, 2006	Russia	2–7	Italy	Solnahallen, Stockholm

A. Tyapkov 36.33; P. Semenov 59.29 / Goals / F. Terlizzi 7.26; F. Mutti 10.31; F. Terlizzi 12.58; P. Santoro 22.17; G. Caroprese 38.49; M. Fantuz 47.07; F. Terlizzi 51.27

Latvia	3–6	Czech Republic	Solnahallen, Stockholm

A. Juškēvičs 26.56; J. Alps 48.39; J. Jansons 52.47 / Goals / M. Ostransky 1.01; A. Zalesny 24.04; Pavel Kozusnik 31.50; P. Machala 35.16; M. Ostransky 38.44; V. Skalik 44.20

May 25, 2006	Czech Republic	10–2	Russia	Solnahallen, Stockholm

J. Freund 4.31; P. Brus 10.21; D. Folta 11.15; M. Richter 13.08; T. Sladky 16.29; V. Skalik 21.08; T. Sladky 24.17; V. Skalik 29.44; M. Richter 46.10; P. Kadlec 54.34 / Goals / A. Tyapkov 38.36; A. Zavertyev 42.39

Finland	12–1	Latvia	Solnahallen, Stockholm

M. Järvi 2.33; M. Bollström 5.13; P. Salminen 6.54; M. Kavekari 12.42; T. Tiitu 17.32; T. Tiitu 19.00; T. Tiitu 23.48; T. Tiitu 35.16; P. Salminen 44.45; S. Manner 54.40; J. Hintikka 56.27 / Goals / A. Juškēvičs 58.39

== Final round ==
Semifinals
A1	Sweden	4
B2	Czech Republic	2
B1	Finland	5
A2	Switzerland	2

Finals
A1	Sweden	7
B1	Finland	6

=== Semifinals ===
May 27, 2006	Sweden	4–2	Czech Republic	Globe Arena, Stockholm

H. Quist 4.56; M. Larsson 7.26; D. Calebsson 13.19; N. Jihde 37.22 / Goals / Pavel Kozusnik 32.06; Pavel Kozusnik 37.05

Finland	5–2	Switzerland	Globe Arena, Stockholm

Mika Kohonen 0.34; M. Järvi 12.26; J. Lehtonen 19.39; Mikko Kohonen 51.10; M. Bollström 58.56 / Goals / C. Hofbauer 15.52; M. Dysli 21.23

=== Bronze-medal match ===
May 28, 2006	Czech Republic	4–9	Switzerland	Globe Arena, Stockholm

Petr Kozusnik 18.42; Petr Kozusnik 45.13; Pavel Kozusnik 46.56; R. Cepek 48.21 / Goals / M. Zürcher 1.16; A. Zimmerman 3.16; C. Hofbauer 31.07; M. Hofbauer 31.32; J. Schneeberger 34.05; M. Zürcher 41.29; A. Zimmerman 47.33; M. Hofbauer48.03; R. Gerber 58.28

=== Championship Match ===
May 28, 2006	Sweden	7–6 sd	Finland	Globe Arena, Stockholm

M. Svensson 14.48; C. Vesterlund 29.03; P. Fischerström 33.20; N. Jihde 45.35; J. Olofsson 52.56; D. Calebsson 55.26 pen M. Svensson 67.54 / Goals / T. Tiitu 4.53; Mika Kohonen 7.48 pen T. Tiitu 8.13; Mika Kohonen 34.56; J. J. Hintikka 44.46; L. Vänttinen 56.29

== Placement round ==
=== 9th-place match ===
May 28, 2006	Germany	5–7	Russia	Globe Arena, Stockholm

F. Holtz 7.35; F. Holtz 26.23; M. Gaude 31.54; F. Hartwig 33.51; F. Hartwig 49.07 / Goals / R. Druzininskiy 4.25; R. Druzininskiy 5.59; R. Druzininskiy 10.00; R. Druzininskiy 25.05; R. Druzininskiy 28.55; V. Gorshenenko 35.19; A. Zavertyev 53.30

=== 7th-place match ===
May 26, 2006	Italy	3–11	Norway	Globe Arena, Stockholm

D. Pondaco 7.01; A. De Icco 44.13; G. Caroprese 58.02 / Goals / A. Sletten 15.43; F. Pettersen 19.39; W. Fauskanger 19.55; F. Pettersen 23.46; R. Evensen 29.57; R. Evensen 37.08; W. Fauskanger 38.51; F. Pettersen 39.55; K. Kronberg 42.49; K. Kronberg 53.07; R. Evensen 59.05

=== 5th-place match ===
May 27, 2006	Denmark	4–5	Latvia	Globe Arena, Stockholm

H. Engelsen 6.55; J. Schow 24.51; M. Andersen 25.20; H. Engelsen 36.44 / Goals / J. Jansons 16.16; J. Peics 36.24; M. Akmentins 42.26; J. Alps 45.17; I. Laivins 59.59

== Leading scorers ==
Player		GP	G	A	PTS	PIM
(Switzerland)	Adrian Zimmerman	6	9	7	16	0
(Switzerland)	Marcus Gerber	6	5	10	15	4
(Finland)	Esa Jussila	6	3	11	14	0
(Finland)	Tero Tiitu	6	11	2	13	2
(Sweden)	Niklas Jihde	6	8	5	13	0
(Switzerland)	Michael Zürcher	6	6	7	13	2
(Czech Republic)	Pavel Kožušník	6	6	7	13	2
(Sweden)	Anders Hellgård	5	3	10	13	0
(Russia)	Roman Druzininskiy	6	9	3	12	4
(Norway)	Ketil Kronberg	5	7	4	11	2
(Norway)	Willy Fauskanger	5	4	7	11	0

== All-Star Team ==
- Goalkeeper: (Finland) Henri Toivoniemi
- Defense: (Sweden) Henrik Quist, (Switzerland) Marcus Gerber
- Forward: (Finland) Tero Tiitu, (Sweden) Anders Hellgård, (Finland) Mika Kohonen

== Ranking ==
Official rankings according to the IFF:

Rk.	Team
1st place, gold medalist(s)	Sweden
2nd place, silver medalist(s)	Finland
3rd place, bronze medalist(s)	Switzerland
4.	Czech Republic
5.	Latvia
6.	Denmark
7.	Norway
8.	Italy
9.	Russia
10.	Germany

== See also ==
- 2006 Men's World Floorball Championships C-Division
