= Tero Tiitu =

Finnish floorball player (born 1982)

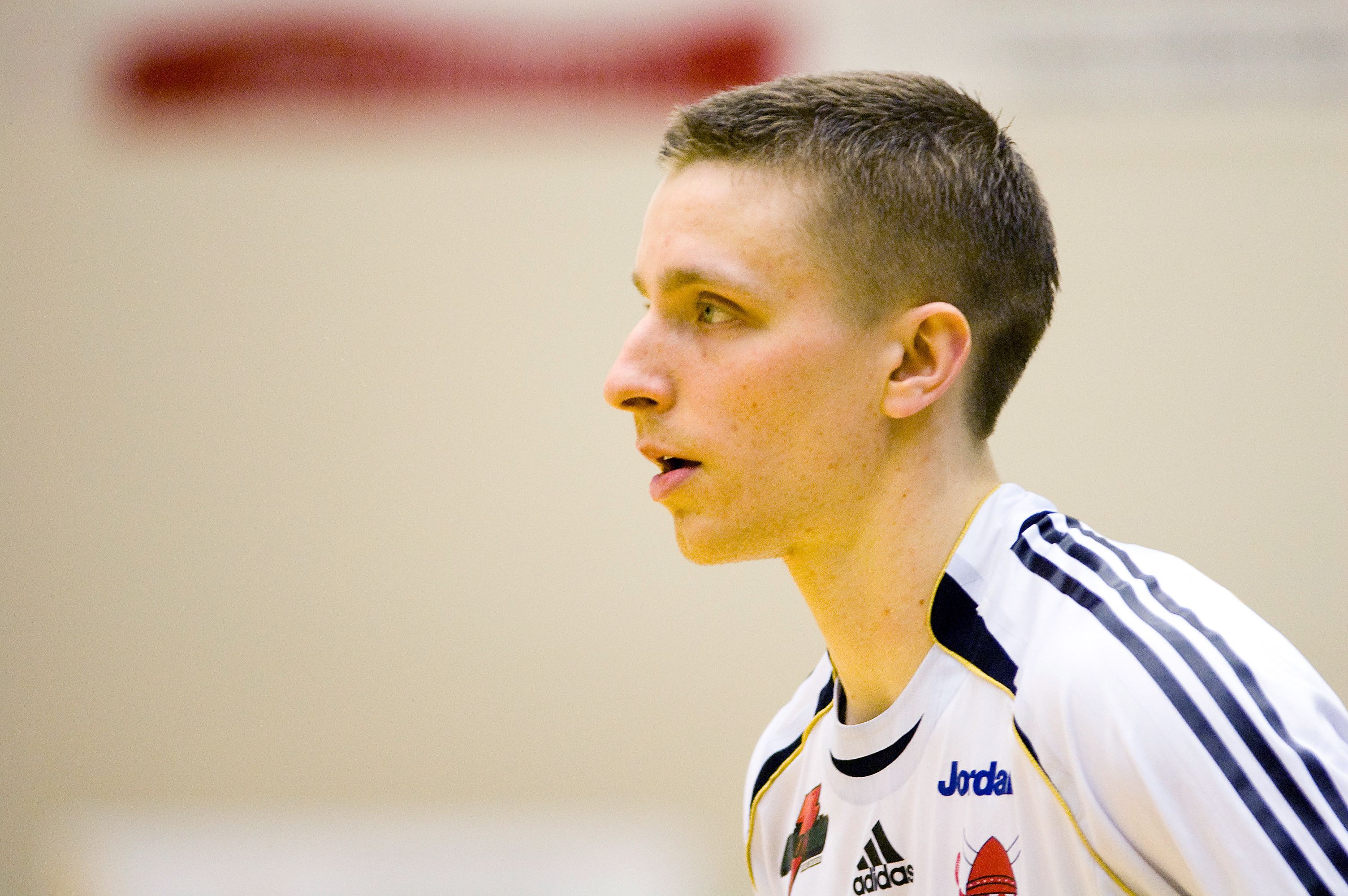
- Tiitu in 2008

Personal information
- Nationality: Finland
- Born: April 23, 1982 (age 44)
- Height: 185 cm (6 ft 1 in)

Sport
- Sport: Floorball
- Position: Defender
- Shoots: Right
- League: F-liiga
- Team: EräViikingit

Tero Tiitu (born April 23, 1982) is a Finnish floorball player currently playing for EräViikingit of the F-liiga.

Tiitu is the holder of the F-liiga's one season goal scoring record of 63 goals. Swedish floorball magazine Innebandymagazinet chose him as the world's second best player in 2008 and third best in 2006. He was picked as the player of the year in F-liiga, then called Salibandyliiga, after the 2007–2008 season.

Tiitu has appeared in over 80 international games. He won the 2008 Floorball World Championship and scored the winning goal in overtime against Sweden. He has also won two silver medals at the World Championships in 2002 and 2006 and a bronze medal in 2004. He was selected in the All-stars team of the 2006 World Championships. He is the all-time leading scorer on the Finnish national team.
