= Bino Drummond =

Swedish politician (born 1982)

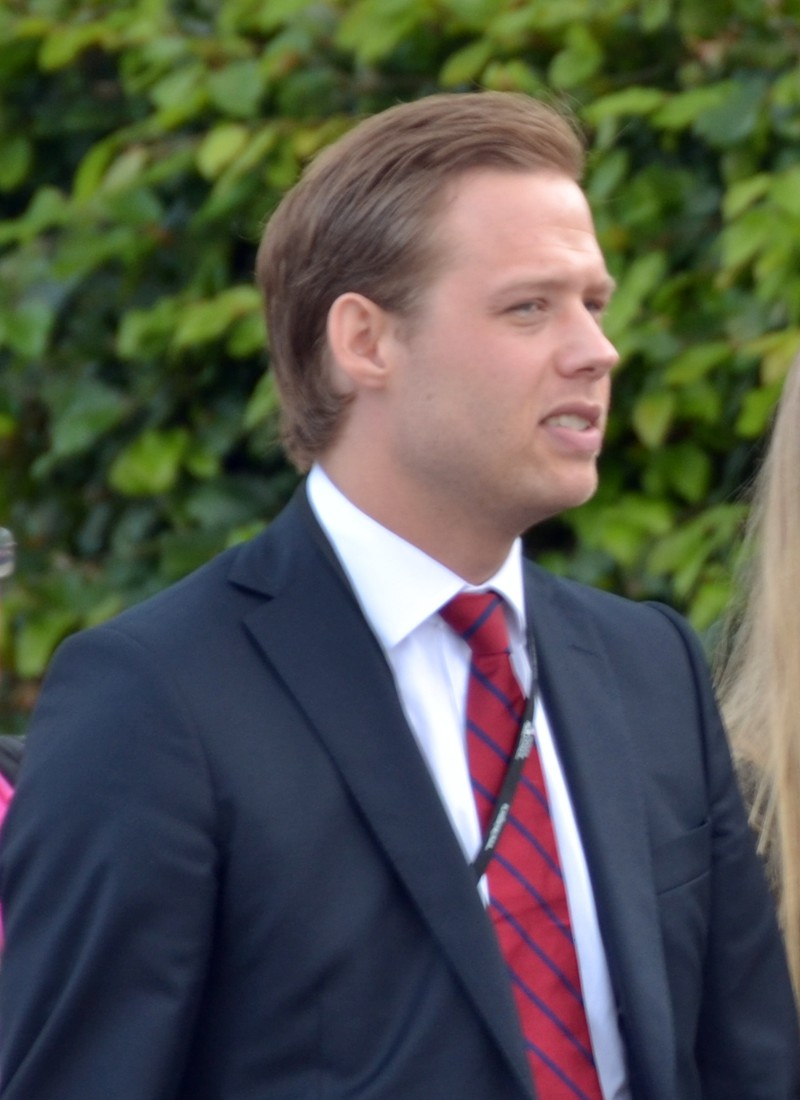
- Drummond in 2012

Member of the Riksdag
- In office 19 March 2012 – 29 September 2014
- Constituency: Stockholm County

Personal details
- Born: 22 June 1982 (age 43)
- Party: Moderate Party

Bino Christopher James Drummond (born 22 June 1982) is a Swedish politician. From 2012 to 2014, he was a member of the Riksdag. From 2018 to 2023, he served as mayor of Norrtälje. In 2002, he participated in the World Floorball Championships as a member of the United States national team. He was born in Fairfax, Virginia, to a Swedish mother and an American father.
