= List of K-1 events =

This is a list of events held and scheduled by K-1, a Japanese kickboxing promotion. The first event, K-1 Sanctuary I, took place on March 30, 1993, at Kōrakuen Hall in Tokyo, Japan.

From 2003, K-1 events were organized by the Fighting and Entertainment Group (FEG). Following FEG's bankruptcy, rights to the K-1 brand were ultimately subsumed by the Hong Kong-based K-1 Global Holdings Limited (K-1 GHL) in 2012.

In 2014, M-1 Sports Media (M-1) acquired rights to use the K-1 brand exclusively in Japan, and has since been producing events for the region under the "K-1 World GP" name. M-1 would ultimately acquire worldwide rights to the K-1 brand in 2023. K-1 branded events held outside Japan (such as the K-1 Fighting Network) are co-promoted shows that weren't produced by M-1.

This list does not include Krush, Krush-EX, Khaos, or K-1 Amateur events.

== Legend ==
Legend
K-1 World Grand Prix (FEG / K-1 GHL; 1993–2013)
K-1 World MAX (FEG / K-1 GHL; 1993–2013)
K-1 World GP (M-1; 2014–present)
K-1 World MAX (M-1; 2014–present)
International / other

== M-1 Sports Media (2023 – present) ==
=== 2027 events ===
Date	Event	Location	Venue	Attendance
TBD	K-1 World MAX 2027 -70kg World Championship Tournament Final	Tokyo, Japan	TBD	
TBD	K-1 World MAX 2027 -70kg World Championship Tournament Final 16	Tokyo, Japan	TBD	
2027-05-09	K-1 World GP 2027 -90kg World Championship Tournament Final	Tokyo, Japan		
2027-02-11	K-1 World GP 2027 -90kg World Championship Tournament Final 16	Tokyo, Japan		

=== 2026 events ===
Date	Event	Location	Venue	Attendance
2026-12-29	K-1 World MAX 2026 -70kg World Championship Tournament Final	Yokohama, Japan	Yokohama Buntai	
2026-12-	K-1 World GP -90kg Qualification in Abu Dhabi	Abu Dhabi, UAE		
2026-12-05	K-1 World GP -90kg Qualification in Paris	Paris, France		
2026-11-27	K-1 Fighting Network in France 2026	Dijon, France	TBD	
2026-11-27	K-1 Fighting Network in Armenia 2026	Yerevan, Armenia	TBD	
2026-11-23	K-1 Revenge II	Tokyo, Japan	Korakuen Hall	
2026-11-07	K-1 World GP -90kg Qualification in Milan	Milan, Italy	Allianz Cloud	
2026-10-31	K-1 World GP -90kg Qualification in Melbourne	Melbourne, Australia	Pullman Albert Park	
2026-10-24	K-1 World GP -90kg Qualification in Dortmund	Dortmund, Germany		
2026-10-09	K-1 World GP -90kg Preliminary in Iași	Iași, Romania	Sala Polivalenta Ora	
2026-10-02	K-1 Fighting Network in Cambodia 2026	Phnom Penh, Cambodia	TBD	
2026-09-26	K-1 World GP -90kg Qualification in Brasília	Brasília, Brazil	AABB Brasília	
2026-09-19	K-1 Fighting Network in Korea 2026	Sangju, South Korea	Sangju Indoor Gymnasium	
2026-09-12	K-1 World MAX 2026 -70kg World Championship Tournament Final 16	Tokyo, Japan	Yoyogi 2nd Gymnasium	
2026-08-01	K-1 World GP -90kg Preliminary in Yekaterinburg	Yekaterinburg, Russia	Archangel Michael Complex	
2026-07-20	K-1 Dontaku 2026	Fukuoka, Japan	Marine Messe Fukuoka Hall B	
2026-06-21	K-1 World MAX 2026 in São Paulo	São Paulo, Brazil	Ginásio do Morumbi	
2026-05-31	K-1 Revenge	Tokyo, Japan	Korakuen Hall	
2026-05-16	K-1 World MAX 2026 in Canary Islands	Las Palmas, Spain	Gran Canaria Arena	
2026-04-25	K-1 World MAX 2026 in Yekaterinburg	Yekaterinburg, Russia	RMK Martial Arts Academy	
2026-04-19	K-1 World MAX 2026 in Utrecht	Utrecht, Netherlands	Gietijzer Utrecht	
2026-04-18	K-1 World MAX 2026 in Athens	Athens, Greece	Sunel Arena	
2026-04-18	K-1 World MAX 2026 in Melbourne	Melbourne, Australia	Pullman Albert Park	
2026-04-11	K-1 Genki 2026	Tokyo, Japan	Yoyogi 2nd Gymnasium	
2026-04-03	K-1 World MAX 2026 in Bucharest	Bucharest, Romania	Sala Polivalentă	
2026-02-08	K-1 World GP 2026 -90kg World Championship Tournament	Tokyo, Japan	Yoyogi 2nd Gymnasium	

=== 2025 events ===
Date	Event	Location	Venue	Attendance
2025-11-29	K-1 World MAX Europe - Oktagon Roma	Rome, Italy	PalaPellicone Ostia	
2025-11-15	K-1 World MAX 2025 - 70kg World Championship Tournament Final	Tokyo, Japan	Yoyogi National Gymnasium	
2025-10-04	K-1 World GP 2025 -90kg in Brasília	Brasilia, Brazil	Shopping Conjunto Nacional	
2025-09-07	K-1 World MAX 2025 - 70kg World Tournament Opening Round	Tokyo, Japan	Yoyogi 2nd Gymnasium	
2025-07-13	K-1 Dontaku	Fukuoka, Japan	Marine Messe Fukuoka Hall B	
2025-06-28	K-1 World MAX 2025 - South American Round	São José dos Pinhais, Brazil	Ginásio Max Rosenmann	
2025-05-31	K-1 Beyond	Yokohama, Japan	Yokohama Buntai	
2025-02-09	K-1 World MAX 2025	Tokyo, Japan	Yoyogi 2nd Gymnasium	

=== 2024 events ===
Date	Event	Location	Venue	Attendance
2024-12-14	K-1 World Grand Prix 2024 Final	Tokyo, Japan	Yoyogi National Gymnasium	
2024-10-05	K-1 World GP 2024 in Osaka	Osaka, Japan	Edion Arena Osaka	
2024-09-29	K-1 World MAX 2024	Tokyo, Japan	Yoyogi 2nd Gymnasium	
2024-08-24	K-1 World GP 2024 in Brasília	Brasília, Brazil	Nilson Nelson Gymnasium	
2024-07-27	K-1 World GP 2024 in Sicily	Rosolini, Italy	Piazza Garibaldi	
2024-07-07	K-1 World MAX 2024 - World Championship Tournament Final	Tokyo, Japan	Yoyogi 2nd Gymnasium	
2024-06-29	K-1 World GP 2024 in Sarajevo	Sarajevo, Bosnia and Herzegovina	Sports Hall Skanderia	
2024-06-07	K-1 Fighting Network Romania 2024	Galați, Romania	Steel Stadium	
2024-03-20	K-1 World MAX 2024 - World Tournament Opening Round	Tokyo, Japan	Yoyogi National Gymnasium	

=== 2023 events ===
Date	Event	Location	Venue	Attendance
2023-12-09	K-1 ReBIRTH 2	Osaka, Japan	Edion Arena Osaka	
2023-09-10	ReBOOT～K-1 ReBIRTH～	Yokohama, Japan	Yokohama Arena	
2023-07-17	K-1 World GP 2023 at Ryogoku	Tokyo, Japan	Ryōgoku Kokugikan	
2023-06-03	K-1 World GP 2023: inaugural Middleweight Championship Tournament	Yokohama, Japan	Yokohama Budokan	
2023-03-12	K-1 World GP 2023: K'Festa 6	Tokyo, Japan	Yoyogi National Gymnasium	

== K-1 Global Holdings Limited and M-1 Sports Media (2014 – 2022) ==
=== 2022 events ===
Date	Event	Location	Venue	Attendance
2022-12-03	K-1 World GP 2022 in Osaka	Osaka, Japan	Edion Arena Osaka	
2022-09-11	K-1 World GP 2022 Yokohamatsuri	Yokohama, Japan	Yokohama Arena	
2022-08-11	K-1 World GP 2022 in Fukuoka	Fukuoka, Japan	Fukuoka Convention Center	
2022-06-25	K-1: Ring of Venus	Tokyo, Japan	Yoyogi National Gymnasium	
2022-06-19	THE MATCH 2022	Tokyo, Japan	Tokyo Dome	56,399
2022-04-03	K-1: K'Festa 5	Tokyo, Japan	Yoyogi National Gymnasium	
2022-02-27	K-1 World GP 2022	Tokyo, Japan	Tokyo Metropolitan Gymnasium	

=== 2021 events ===
Date	Event	Location	Venue	Attendance
2021-12-04	K-1 World GP 2021 in Osaka	Osaka, Japan	EDION Arena Osaka	
2021-09-20	K-1 World GP 2021: Yokohamatsuri	Yokohama, Japan	Yokohama Arena	
2021-07-17	K-1 World GP 2021 in Fukuoka	Fukuoka, Japan	Fukuoka Convention Center	
2021-05-30	K-1 World GP 2021: Japan Bantamweight Tournament	Yokohama, Japan	Yokohama Budokan	
2021-03-28	K-1: K’Festa 4 Day 2	Tokyo, Japan	Nippon Budokan	
2021-03-21	K-1: K’Festa 4 Day 1	Tokyo, Japan	Tokyo Garden Theatre	

=== 2020 events ===
Date	Event	Location	Venue	Attendance
2020-12-13	K-1 World GP 2020 Winter's Crucial Bout	Tokyo, Japan	Ryōgoku Kokugikan	
2020-11-03	K-1 World GP 2020 in Fukuoka	Fukuoka, Japan	Fukuoka Convention Center	
2020-09-22	K-1 World GP 2020 in Osaka	Osaka, Japan	EDION Arena Osaka	
2020-03-22	K-1: K’Festa 3	Saitama, Japan	Saitama Super Arena	6,500

=== 2019 events ===
Date	Event	Location	Venue	Attendance
2019-12-28	K-1 World GP 2019 Inaugural Women's Flyweight Championship Tournament	Nagoya, Japan	Dolphin's Arena	6,000
2019-11-24	K-1 World GP 2019 Yokohamatsuri	Yokohama, Japan	Yokohama Arena	12,000
2019-08-24	K-1 World GP 2019: Japan vs World 5 vs 5 & Special Superfight in Osaka	Osaka, Japan	EDION Arena Osaka	7,800
2019-06-30	K-1 World GP 2019: Super Bantamweight World Tournament	Tokyo, Japan	Ryōgoku Kokugikan	10,500
2019-03-10	K-1 World GP 2019: K’FESTA 2	Saitama, Japan	Saitama Super Arena	16,000

=== 2018 events ===
Date	Event	Location	Venue	Attendance
2018-12-08	K-1 World GP 2018: K-1 Lightweight World's Strongest Tournament	Osaka, Japan	EDION Arena Osaka	8,000
2018-11-03	K-1 World GP 2018: 3rd Super Lightweight Championship Tournament	Saitama, Japan	Saitama Super Arena	7,000
2018-09-24	K-1 World GP 2018: inaugural Cruiserweight Championship Tournament	Saitama, Japan	Saitama Super Arena	8,000
2018-06-17	K-1 World GP 2018: 2nd Featherweight Championship Tournament	Saitama, Japan	Saitama Super Arena	8,000
2018-03-21	K-1 World GP 2018: K'FESTA.1	Saitama, Japan	Saitama Super Arena	15,000

=== 2017 events ===
Date	Event	Location	Venue	Attendance
2017-12-27	K-1 World GP 2017 Japan Survival Wars 2017	Tokyo, Japan	Korakuen Hall	1,850
2017-11-23	K-1 World GP 2017 Japan Heavyweight Championship Tournament	Saitama, Japan	Saitama Super Arena	8,000
2017-09-18	K-1 World GP 2017 Welterweight Championship Tournament	Saitama, Japan	Saitama Super Arena	8,000
2017-06-18	K-1 World GP 2017 Super Welterweight Championship Tournament	Saitama, Japan	Saitama Super Arena	8,000
2017-06-10	K-1 World GP 2017 Andy Hug Memorial	Switzerland, Zug	Bossard Arena	
2017-04-22	K-1 World GP 2017 Super Bantamweight Championship Tournament	Tokyo, Japan	Yoyogi National Gymnasium	4,800
2017-02-25	K-1 World GP 2017 Lightweight Championship Tournament	Tokyo, Japan	Yoyogi National Gymnasium	4,800

=== 2016 events ===
Date	Event	Location	Venue	Attendance
2016-12-03	K-1 World GP 2016 Euro -85kg Tournament	Tuzla, Bosnia & Herzegovina	SKPC Mejdan	
2016-11-03	K-1 World GP 2016 Featherweight World Tournament	Tokyo, Japan	Yoyogi National Gymnasium	4,800
2016-10-27	K-1 World GP 2016 Euro -95kg Tournament	Belgrade, Serbia	Crowne Plaza Belgrade	
2016-09-19	K-1 World GP 2016 Super Featherweight World Tournament	Tokyo, Japan	Yoyogi National Gymnasium	4,800
2016-06-24	K-1 World GP 2016 -65kg World Tournament	Tokyo, Japan	Yoyogi National Gymnasium	4,800
2016-04-24	K-1 World GP 2016 -60kg Japan Tournament	Tokyo, Japan	Yoyogi National Gymnasium	4,800
2016-03-04	K-1 World GP 2016 -65kg Japan Tournament	Tokyo, Japan	Yoyogi National Gymnasium	4,800

=== 2015 events ===
Date	Event	Location	Venue	Attendance
2015-11-21	K-1 World GP 2015 The Championship	Tokyo, Japan	Yoyogi National Gymnasium	4,800
2015-09-22	K-1 World GP 2015 Survival Wars	Tokyo, Japan	Korakuen Hall	4,500
2015-07-04	K-1 World GP 2015 -70kg Championship Tournament	Tokyo, Japan	Yoyogi National Gymnasium	4,500
2015-04-19	K-1 World GP 2015 -55kg Championship Tournament	Tokyo, Japan	Yoyogi National Gymnasium	4,600
2015-02-01	K-1 China vs. Japan	Changsha, China	Golden Eagle Culture City	
2015-01-18	K-1 World GP 2015 -60kg Championship Tournament	Tokyo, Japan	Yoyogi National Gymnasium	4,500
2015-01-01	K-1 China vs. USA	Changsha, China	Golden Eagle Culture City	

=== 2014 events ===
Date	Event	Location	Venue	Attendance
2014-11-03	K-1 World GP 2014 -65kg Championship Tournament	Tokyo, Japan	Yoyogi National Gymnasium	4,150
2014-10-11	K-1 World MAX 2014 World Championship Tournament Final	Pattaya, Thailand	Indoor Athletic Stadium	
2014-02-23	K-1 World MAX World Championship Tournament Final 4	Baku, Azerbaijan	Sarhadchi Olympic Sport Complex	
2014-01-11	K-1 World MAX World Championship Tournament Quarter-final in Gran Canaria	Gran Canaria, Spain	Pabellón Rita Hernández	

== K-1 Global Holdings Limited (2012 – 2013) ==
=== 2013 events ===
Date	Event	Location	Venue	Attendance
2013-12-28	K-1 World MAX World Championship Tournament Quarter-final in Foshan	Foshan, China	Lingnan Mingzhu Arena	
2013-09-21	K-1 MAX World Tour: England 2013	Warrington, UK	Parr Hall	
2013-09-14	K-1 World MAX World Championship Tournament Final 16	Mallorca, Spain	Palma Arena	
2013-06-22	K-1 World Max tryout 2013 in Brazil	Vila Velha, Brazil		
2013-06-08	K-1 World Qualifying Tour 2013 in Calgary	Calgary, Alberta, Canada	Century Casino	
2013-04-27	K-1 World Grand Prix 2013 in Vilnius	Vilnius, Lithuania	Siemens Arena	
2013-03-30	K-1 World Grand Prix 2013 in Moldova – Light Heavyweight Tournament	Chișinău, Moldova	Manej Sport Arena	
2013-03-15	K-1 World Grand Prix FINAL in Zagreb	Zagreb, Croatia	Arena Zagreb	15,000
2013-02-02	K-1 Korea MAX 2013	Seoul, South Korea	Olympic Park	14,370

=== 2012 events ===
Date	Event	Location	Venue	Attendance
2012-12-15	K-1 World MAX 2012 World Championship Tournament Final	Athens, Greece	O.A.C.A. Olympic Indoor Hall	
2012-10-14	K-1 World Grand Prix 2012 in Tokyo final 16	Tokyo, Japan	Ryōgoku Kokugikan	
2012-09-08	K-1 World Grand Prix 2012 in Los Angeles	Los Angeles, United States	Memorial Sports Arena	
2012-05-27	K-1 World MAX 2012 World Championship Tournament Final 16	Madrid, Spain	Palacio Vistalegre	

== 1993 – 2011 ==
=== 2011 events ===
Date	Event	Location	Venue	Attendance
2011-09-25	K-1 World MAX 2011 –70 kg Japan Tournament Final	Osaka, Japan	Osaka Prefectural Gymnasium	5,410
2011-06-25	K-1 World MAX 2011 –63 kg Japan Tournament Final	Tokyo, Japan	Yoyogi National Gymnasium	3,195
2011-01-08	K-1 MAX Madrid 2011	Madrid, Spain		

=== 2010 events ===
Date	Event	Location	Venue	Attendance
2010-12-31	Dynamite!! 2010	Saitama, Japan	Saitama Super Arena	26,729
2010-12-11	K-1 World Grand Prix 2010 Final	Tokyo, Japan	Ariake Coliseum	11,835
2010-11-27	K-1 Scandinavia Rumble of the Kings 2010	Stockholm, Sweden	Hovet Arena	
2010-11-08	K-1 World MAX 2010 World Championship Tournament Final	Tokyo, Japan	Ryōgoku Kokugikan	9,189
2010-10-03	K-1 World MAX 2010 in Seoul World Championship Tournament Final 16	Seoul, South Korea	Olympic Gymnasium-1	6,639
2010-10-02	K-1 World Grand Prix 2010 in Seoul Final 16	Seoul, South Korea	Olympic Gymnasium-1	12,719
2010-07-10	K-1 World Grand Prix 2010 in Canberra	Canberra, Australia	National Convention Centre	
2010-07-05	K-1 World MAX 2010 World Championship Tournament Final 16 / -63kg Japan Tournament Final	Tokyo, Japan	Yoyogi National Gymnasium	9,907
2010-05-21	K-1 World Grand Prix 2010 in Bucharest – Europe GP	Bucharest, Romania	Romexpo Dome	5,000
2010-05-02	K-1 World MAX 2010 –63 kg Japan Tournament Final 16	Tokyo, Japan	JCB Hall	3,871
2010-04-24	K-1 World Grand Prix Selection 2010	Istanbul, Turkey	BJK Akatlar Arena	
2010-04-10	K-1 World Grand Prix 2010 in Vilnius – Europe GP Elimination Tournament B	Vilnius, Lithuania	Siemens Arena	
2010-04-03	K-1 World Grand Prix 2010 in Yokohama	Yokohama, Japan	Yokohama Arena	10,153
2010-03-28	K-1 World Grand Prix 2010 in Warsaw – Europe GP Elimination Tournament A	Warsaw, Poland	Torwar Hall	
2010-03-27	K-1 World MAX 2010 –70 kg Japan Tournament	Saitama, Japan	Saitama Super Arena	6,216
2010-03-27	K-1 ColliZion 2010 Croatia	Split, Croatia	Spaladium Arena	
2010-03-21	K-1 World MAX 2010 West Europe Tournament	Utrecht, Netherlands	Vechtsebanen	
2010-03-19	K-1 World MAX 2010 East Europe Tournament	Minsk, Belarus	Minsk Sports Palace	
2010-02-06	K-1 ColliZion MAX 2010 Europe GP	Budapest, Hungary	Budapest Sports Arena	
2010-01-29	K-1 rules Kick Tournament 2010 in Marseille	Marseille, France	Salle Vallier	

=== 2009 events ===
Date	Event	Location	Venue	Attendance
2009-12-31	Dynamite!! 2009	Saitama, Japan	Saitama Super Arena	45,606
2009-12-18	K-1 Moldova Grand Prix FEA 2009	Chișinău, Moldova	Night Club "Drive"	
2009-12-12	K-1 ColliZion 2009 Final Tournament	Prague, Czech Republic	O2 Arena	
2009-12-05	K-1 World Grand Prix 2009 Final	Yokohama, Japan	Yokohama Arena	17,626
2009-11-21	K-1 Europe Grand Prix 2009 in Tallinn	Tallinn, Estonia	Nokia Hall	
2009-11-20	K-1 Rumble of the Kings 2009 in Stockholm	Stockholm, Sweden	Hovet Arena	
2009-10-26	K-1 World MAX 2009 World Championship Tournament Final	Yokohama, Japan	Yokohama Arena	11,231
2009-10-24	K-1 ColliZion 2009 Final Elimination	Arad, Romania	Sala Sporturilor	
2009-09-26	K-1 World Grand Prix 2009 in Seoul Final 16	Seoul, South Korea	Olympic Gymnasium-1	15,714
2009-09-21	K-1 ColliZion 2009 Romania Qualification Round	Ploiești, Romania	Olimpia Sports Hall	
2009-08-11	K-1 World Grand Prix 2009 in Tokyo final 16 Qualifying GP	Tokyo, Japan	Yoyogi National Gymnasium	4,137
2009-08-02	K-1 World Grand Prix 2009 in Seoul	Seoul, South Korea	Jangchung Gymnasium	
2009-07-13	K-1 World MAX 2009 World Championship Tournament Final 8	Tokyo, Japan	Nippon Budokan	16,555
2009-07-04	K-1 MAX Canarias 2009	Santa Cruz de Tenerife, Canary Islands	Palacio Municipal de Deportes	
2009-07-03	K-1 ColliZion 2009 Sarajevo	Sarajevo, Bosnia and Herzegovina	Olympic Hall Zetra	7,000
2009-06-06	K-1 Spain Battles 2009	Barcelona, Spain	Palau Sant Jordi	
2009-05-23	K-1 World Grand Prix 2009 in Łódź	Łódź, Poland	Łódź Sport Hall	
2009-05-22	K-1 Rumble of the Kings Qualification 2009 Malmö	Malmö, Sweden	Baltiska Hallen	
2009-05-16	K-1 ColliZion 2009 Mladá Boleslav	Mladá Boleslav, Czech Republic	Zimni Stadium	
2009-04-21	K-1 World MAX 2009 World Championship Tournament Final 16	Fukuoka, Japan	Marine Messe	7,130
2009-03-28	K-1 World Grand Prix 2009 in Yokohama	Yokohama, Japan	Yokohama Arena	10,328
2009-03-21	K-1 ColliZion 2009 Croatia	Split, Croatia	Spaladium Arena	9,000
2009-03-20	K-1 Award & MAX Korea 2009	Seoul, South Korea	Central City Millennium Hall	
2009-03-01	K-1 World MAX 2009 Europe Tournament	Utrecht, Netherlands	Vechtsebanen	
2009-02-28	K-1 rules Tournament 2009 in Budapest	Budapest, Hungary	Budapest Sports Arena	
2009-02-27	K-1 Rumble of the Kings Qualification 2009 Norrköping	Norrköping, Sweden	Stadium Arena	2,468
2009-02-23	K-1 World MAX 2009 Japan Tournament	Tokyo, Japan	Yoyogi National Gymnasium	10,421

=== 2008 events ===
Date	Event	Location	Venue	Attendance
2008-12-31	Dynamite!! 2008	Saitama, Japan	Saitama Super Arena	25,634
2008-12-20	K-1 Fighting Network Prague 2008	Prague, Czech Republic	O2 Arena	
2008-12-06	K-1 World Grand Prix 2008 Final	Yokohama, Japan	Yokohama Arena	17,823
2008-11-22	K-1 World Grand Prix 2008 in Riga	Riga, Latvia	Riga Arena	
2008-10-31	K-1 Scandinavia Rumble of the Kings 2008	Luleå, Sweden	Pontushallen	2,048
2008-10-01	K-1 World MAX 2008 World Championship Tournament Final	Tokyo, Japan	Nippon Budokan	15,231
2008-09-27	K-1 World Grand Prix 2008 in Seoul Final 16	Seoul, South Korea	Olympic Gymnasium-1	15,729
2008-09-12	K-1 Slovakia 2008	Bratislava, Slovakia	Sportova Hala Pasienky	
2008-08-19	K-1 rules Tournament 2008 in Hungary	Debrecen, Hungary	Főnix Hall	4,000
2008-08-09	K-1 World Grand Prix 2008 in Hawaii	Honolulu, Hawaii	Stan Sheriff Center	8,807
2008-07-13	K-1 World Grand Prix 2008 in Taipei	Taipei, Taiwan	Taipei World Trade Center	10,000
2008-07-07	K-1 World MAX 2008 World Championship Tournament Final 8	Tokyo, Japan	Nippon Budokan	11,610
2008-06-29	K-1 World Grand Prix 2008 in Fukuoka	Fukuoka, Japan	Marine Messe Fukuoka	6,927
2008-06-07	K-1 Hungary MAX 2008	Dunaújváros, Hungary	Dunaujvarosi Sportcsarnok	
2008-05-31	K-1 Scandinavia MAX 2008	Stockholm, Sweden	Hovet Arena	
2008-05-17	K-1 Fighting Network Austria 2008	Vienna, Austria	Kagraner Schultz-Halle	1,000
2008-05-10	K-1 Europe MAX 2008 in Italy	Modena, Italy	PalaPanini	5,000
2008-04-26	K-1 World Grand Prix 2008 in Amsterdam	Amsterdam, Netherlands	Amsterdam Arena	20,000
2008-04-13	K-1 World Grand Prix 2008 in Yokohama	Yokohama, Japan	Yokohama Arena	10,629
2008-04-12	K-1 Italy Oktagon 2008	Milan, Italy	Palalido di Milan	
2008-04-12	K-1 Warriors 2008	Lübeck, Germany	Hansehalle	2,000
2008-04-09	K-1 World MAX 2008 World Championship Tournament Final 16	Hiroshima, Japan	Hiroshima Green Arena	6,700
2008-04-06	K-1 Europe MAX 2008 in Poland	Warsaw, Poland	Torwar Hall	5,600
2008-02-24	K-1 Asia MAX 2008 in Seoul Asia Tournament	Seoul, South Korea	Jangchung Gymnasium	
2008-02-17	K-1 MAX Netherlands 2008 The Final Qualification	Utrecht, Netherlands	Vechtsebanen	3,500
2008-02-09	K-1 World Grand Prix 2008 in Budapest Europe GP Final Elimination	Budapest, Hungary	Budapest Sports Arena	
2008-02-02	K-1 World MAX 2008 Japan Tournament	Tokyo, Japan	Nippon Budokan	9,549
2008-02-01	K-1 rules Kick Tournament 2008 in Marseille	Marseille, France	Salle Vallier	

=== 2007 events ===
Date	Event	Location	Venue	Attendance
2007-12-31	K-1 PREMIUM 2007 Dynamite!!	Osaka, Japan	Osaka Dome	47,928
2007-12-15	K-1 Fighting Network Prague 2007	Prague, Czech Republic	Sazka Arena	
2007-12-08	K-1 World Grand Prix 2007 Final	Yokohama, Japan	Yokohama Arena	17,667
2007-11-10	K-1 Championships 2007 German Finals	Lübeck, Germany	Hansehalle	
2007-11-02	K-1 Fighting Network Turkey 2007	Istanbul, Turkey	Istanbul Gösteri Merkezi	
2007-10-13	K-1 Fighting Network Latvia 2007	Riga, Latvia	Riga Arena	
2007-10-03	K-1 World MAX 2007 World Championship Final	Tokyo, Japan	Nippon Budokan	14,231
2007-09-29	K-1 World Grand Prix 2007 in Seoul Final 16	Seoul, South Korea	Olympic Gymnasium-1	16,652
2007-08-19	K-1 Fighting Network Hungary 2007	Debrecen, Hungary	Főnix Hall	
2007-08-11	K-1 World Grand Prix 2007 in Las Vegas	Las Vegas	Bellagio	5,770
2007-08-05	K-1 World Grand Prix 2007 in Hong Kong	Hong Kong	AsiaWorld-Expo	10,634
2007-07-21	K-1 Fighting Network KHAN 2007	Seoul, South Korea	Jangchung Gymnasium	
2007-06-28	K-1 World MAX 2007 World Tournament Final Elimination	Tokyo, Japan	Nippon Budokan	12,628
2007-06-23	K-1 World Grand Prix 2007 in Amsterdam	Amsterdam, Netherlands	Amsterdam Arena	25,000
2007-06-09	K-1 rules Heavyweight Tournament 2007 in Poland	Nowy Targ, Poland	Miejska Hala Lodowa	
2007-05-20	K-1 UK MAX Tournament 2007 Pain & Glory	London, England	ExCeL Exhibition Centre	
2007-05-19	K-1 Fighting Network Scandinavian Qualification 2007	Stockholm, Sweden	Hovet Arena	5,700
2007-05-04	K-1 Fighting Network Romania 2007	Bucharest, Romania	Polyvalent Hall	4,000
2007-04-28	K-1 World Grand Prix 2007 in Hawaii	Honolulu, Hawaii	Neal S. Blaisdell Center	7,066
2007-04-14	K-1 Italy Oktagon 2007	Milan, Italy	Mazda Palace	9,000
2007-04-14	K-1 Gladiators 2007 in Estonia	Tallinn, Estonia	Saku Suurhall	2,000
2007-04-04	K-1 World MAX 2007 World Elite Showcase	Yokohama, Japan	Yokohama Arena	11,628
2007-03-17	K-1 rules European Warriors 2007	Lübeck, Germany	Hansehalle	
2007-03-17	K-1 East Europe MAX 2007	Vilnius, Lithuania	Siemens Arena	
2007-03-10	K-1 Fighting Network Croatia 2007	Split, Croatia	Sportski Centar Gripe	6,000
2007-03-04	K-1 World Grand Prix 2007 in Yokohama	Yokohama, Japan	Yokohama Arena	9,650
2007-02-24	K-1 rules Heavy Weights Academy 2007	Tournai, Belgium	Hall des Sports de Tournai	1,200
2007-02-24	K-1 European League 2007 Hungary	Budapest, Hungary	Budapest Sports Arena	
2007-02-18	K-1 Fighting Network KHAN 2007 in Seoul	Seoul, Korea	Olympic Gymnasium-1	3,462
2007-02-05	K-1 World MAX 2007 Japan Tournament	Tokyo, Japan	Ariake Coliseum	8,961
2007-01-26	K-1 rules Kick Tournament 2007 in Marseille	Marseille, France	Salle Vallier	
2007-01-13	K-1 rules Heavyweight Tournament 2007 in Turkey	Istanbul, Turkey	Lufti Kirdar	

=== 2006 events ===
Date	Event	Location	Venue	Attendance
2006-12-31	K-1 PREMIUM 2006 Dynamite!!	Osaka, Japan	Osaka Dome	51,930
2006-12-16	K-1 Fighting Network Prague Round '07	Prague, Czech Republic	Sazka Arena	
2006-12-02	K-1 World Grand Prix 2006 in Tokyo Final	Tokyo, Japan	Tokyo Dome	54,800
2006-11-24	K-1 World MAX North European Qualification 2007	Stockholm, Sweden	Hovet Arena	8,700
2006-11-24	K-1 MAX Ukraine 2006	Dnipropetrovsk, Ukraine	Time Out Nightclub	
2006-11-19	K-1 MAX Canarias 2006	Santa Cruz de Tenerife, Canary Islands	Palacio Municipal de los Deportes	4,000
2006-11-18	K-1 Kings of Oceania 2006 Round 3	Auckland, New Zealand	Trusts Stadium	5,200
2006-11-04	K-1 Fighting Network Riga 2006	Riga, Latvia	Riga Arena	1,800
2006-10-15	K-1 rules "First Step Road To Tokyo" 2006	Wolverhampton, England	Civic Hall	
2006-10-14	K-1 rules Africa Bomba-Yaa 2006	Johannesburg, South Africa	Emperor's Palace	
2006-09-30	K-1 World Grand Prix 2006 in Osaka opening round	Osaka, Japan	Osaka-jō Hall	10,387
2006-09-16	K-1 Fighting Network KHAN 2006 in Seoul	Seoul, South Korea	Jangchung Gymnasium	
2006-09-16	K-1 Kings of Oceania 2006 Round 2	Auckland, New Zealand	Trusts Stadium	
2006-09-16	K-1 Fight Night Mannheim 2006	Mannheim, Germany	Multihalle	2,000
2006-09-04	K-1 World MAX 2006 Champions' Challenge	Tokyo, Japan	Ariake Coliseum	9,950
2006-08-18	K-1 Hungary 2006	Debrecen, Hungary	Főnix Hall	
2006-08-12	K-1 World Grand Prix 2006 in Las Vegas II	Las Vegas, USA	Bellagio	5,690
2006-07-30	K-1 World Grand Prix 2006 in Sapporo	Sapporo, Japan	Makomanai Ice Arena	8,390
2006-06-30	K-1 World MAX 2006 World Championship Final	Yokohama, Japan	Yokohama Arena	16,918
2006-06-24	K-1 Kings of Oceania 2006 Round 1	Auckland, New Zealand	Trusts Stadium	5,000
2006-06-17	K-1 Canarias 2006	Santa Cruz de Tenerife, Canary Islands	Pabellon Santiago Martin	2,500
2006-06-03	K-1 World Grand Prix 2006 in Seoul	Seoul, South Korea	Olympic Gymnasium-1	14,880
2006-05-26	K-1 rules "Le Grand Tournoi" 2006	Paris, France	Palais Omnisports de Paris-Bercy	
2006-05-20	K-1 Scandinavia Grand Prix 2006	Stockholm, Sweden	Globen Arena	10,000
2006-05-13	K-1 World Grand Prix 2006 in Amsterdam	Amsterdam, Netherlands	Amsterdam Arena	17,500
2006-04-29	K-1 World Grand Prix 2006 in Las Vegas	Las Vegas	The Mirage	6,730
2006-04-08	K-1 Italy Oktagon 2006	Milan, Italy	Mazda Palace	4,000
2006-04-05	K-1 World MAX 2006 World Tournament Open	Tokyo, Japan	Yoyogi National Gymnasium	10,800
2006-03-31	K-1 MAX Portugal 2006	Loures, Portugal	Pavilhão Paz e Amizade	4,000
2006-03-26	K-1 MAX Netherlands 2006 The Road to Tokyo	Utrecht, Netherlands	De Vechtsebanen	
2006-03-17	K-1 Russia MAX 2006	Kaliningrad, Russia	Sports Club "Junost"	
2006-03-10	K-1 East Europe MAX 2006	Vilnius, Lithuania	Siemens Arena	6,000
2006-03-05	K-1 World Grand Prix 2006 in Auckland	Auckland, New Zealand	Trusts Stadium	8,800
2006-02-25	K-1 Fighting Network KHAN 2006 in Busan	Busan, South Korea	BEXCO	4,267
2006-02-17	K-1 European League 2006 in Budapest	Budapest, Hungary	Budapest Sports Arena	
2006-02-17	K-1 European League 2006 in Bratislava	Bratislava, Slovakia	Spotova Hala Pasienky	
2006-02-04	K-1 World MAX 2006 Japan Tournament	Saitama, Japan	Saitama Super Arena	13,927
2006-01-20	K-1 Fighting Network 2006 in Marseille	Marseille, France	Salle Vallier	

=== 2005 events ===
Date	Event	Location	Venue	Attendance
2005-12-31	K-1 PREMIUM 2005 Dynamite!!	Osaka, Japan	Osaka Dome	53,025
2005-12-10	K-1 Final Battle 2005	Lübeck, Germany	Hansehalle	
2005-12-10	K-1 Kings of Oceania 2005 Round 3	Gold Coast, Australia	Convention Center	
2005-11-19	K-1 World Grand Prix 2005 in Tokyo Final	Tokyo, Japan	Tokyo Dome	58,213
2005-11-05	K-1 Fighting Network Korea MAX 2005	Seoul, South Korea	Olympic Gymnasium-1	4,380
2005-10-29	K-1 New Talents 2005 in Germany	Koblenz, Germany	Sporthalle Oberwerth	4,078
2005-10-22	K-1 Brazil Grand Prix 2005 in São Paulo	Serra Negra, Brazil	Ginásio Poliesportivo da Serra Negra	
2005-10-12	K-1 World MAX 2005 Champions' Challenge	Tokyo, Japan	Yoyogi National Gymnasium	11,800
2005-10-08	K-1 Kings of Oceania 2005 Round 2	Auckland, New Zealand	Trusts Stadium	
2005-09-23	K-1 World Grand Prix 2005 in Osaka – Final Elimination	Osaka, Japan	Osaka Dome	31,800
2005-08-19	K-1 Hungary Grand Prix 2005	Debrecen, Hungary	Főnix Hall	
2005-08-13	K-1 World Grand Prix 2005 in Las Vegas II	Las Vegas	The Mirage	3,504
2005-07-30	K-1 Kings of Oceania 2005 Round 1	Auckland, New Zealand	Trusts Stadium	
2005-07-29	K-1 World Grand Prix 2005 in Hawaii	Honolulu, Hawaii	Aloha Stadium	14,800
2005-07-20	K-1 World MAX 2005 Championship Final	Yokohama, Japan	Yokohama Arena	17,720
2005-06-25	K-1 Challenge 2005 Xplosion X	Gold Coast, Australia	Convention Center	
2005-06-14	K-1 World Grand Prix 2005 in Hiroshima	Hiroshima, Japan	Hiroshima Green Arena	7,166
2005-05-27	K-1 World Grand Prix 2005 in Paris	Paris, France	Palais Omnisports de Paris-Bercy	11,250
2005-05-21	K-1 Scandinavia Grand Prix 2005	Stockholm, Sweden	Globen Arena	10,900
2005-05-06	K-1 Slovakia 2005	Bratislava, Slovakia	Sibamac Arena	
2005-05-04	K-1 World MAX 2005 World Tournament Open	Tokyo, Japan	Ariake Coliseum	13,918
2005-04-30	K-1 World Grand Prix 2005 in Las Vegas	Las Vegas	Bellagio	8,890
2005-04-30	K-1 Battle of Anzacs II	Auckland, New Zealand	Trusts Stadium	
2005-04-16	K-1 Italy 2005 Oktagon	Milan, Italy	Mazda Palace	
2005-04-02	K-1 Canarias 2005	Santa Cruz de Tenerife, Canary Islands	Pabellón Central	4,000
2005-03-19	K-1 World Grand Prix 2005 in Seoul	Seoul, South Korea	Olympic Gymnasium-1	15,918
2005-03-12	K-1 New Talents 2005 in Lübeck	Lübeck, Germany	Hansehalle	2,700
2005-02-23	K-1 World MAX 2005 Japan Tournament	Tokyo, Japan	Ariake Coliseum	10,723
2005-01-19	K-1 France Grand Prix 2005 in Marseille	Marseille, France	Salle Vallier	

=== 2004 events ===
Date	Event	Location	Venue	Attendance
2004-12-31	K-1 PREMIUM 2004 Dynamite!!	Osaka, Japan	Osaka Dome	52,918
2004-12-18	K-1 MAX Spain 2004	Guadalajara, Spain		
2004-12-18	K-1 Challenge 2004 Oceania vs World	Gold Coast, Australia	Convention Center	
2004-12-04	K-1 World Grand Prix 2004 Final	Tokyo, Japan	Tokyo Dome	64,819
2004-11-20	K-1 Fighting Network Rumble on the Rock 2004	Honolulu, Hawaii	Neal S. Blaisdell Arena	13,000
2004-11-06	K-1 Titans 1st	Kitakyushu, Japan	Kitakyushu Media Dome	
2004-11-05	K-1 Oceania MAX 2004	Auckland, New Zealand	Trusts Stadium	
2004-10-30	K-1 Brazil 2004 Challenge	Goiânia, Brazil	CPMG Hugo de Carvalho Ramos	
2004-10-13	K-1 World MAX 2004 Champions' Challenge	Tokyo, Japan	Yoyogi National Gymnasium	11,800
2004-09-25	K-1 World Grand Prix 2004 Final Elimination	Tokyo, Japan	Nippon Budokan	14,860
2004-09-11	K-1 New Talents 2004 in Lübeck	Lübeck, Germany	Hanse Halle	2,300
2004-08-07	K-1 World Grand Prix 2004 in Las Vegas II	Las Vegas	Bellagio	4,930
2004-07-17	K-1 World Grand Prix 2004 in Seoul	Seoul, South Korea	Chamshil Gymnasium	10,338
2004-07-16	K-1 Kings of Oceania 2004	Auckland, New Zealand	ASB Stadium	
2004-07-07	K-1 World MAX 2004 World Tournament Final	Tokyo, Japan	Yoyogi National Gymnasium	14,819
2004-06-26	K-1 Beast 2004 in Shizuoka	Shizuoka, Japan	Shizuoka Ecopa Arena	5,500
2004-06-11	K-1 Grand Prix BIH 2004	Široki Brijeg, Bosnia-Herzegovina	Pecara Stadium	
2004-06-06	K-1 World Grand Prix 2004 in Nagoya	Nagoya, Japan	Nagoya Rainbow Hall	9,639
2004-05-30	K-1 ~ Ichigeki : Kyokushin vs K-1 All Out Battle 2004 ~	Tokyo, Japan	Nippon Budokan	7,596
2004-05-15	K-1 Poland 2004	Pruszków, Poland		
2004-04-30	K-1 World Grand Prix 2004 in Las Vegas I	Las Vegas	Bellagio	4,917
2004-04-24	K-1 Italy 2004	Milan, Italy	Mazda Palace	7,000
2004-04-23	K-1 Battle of Anzacs 2004	Auckland, New Zealand	ASB Stadium	
2004-04-07	K-1 World MAX 2004 World Tournament Open	Tokyo, Japan	Yoyogi National Gymnasium	12,918
2004-04-03	K-1 VSN Cup 2004 Japan GP	Yokohama, Japan	Yokohama Arena	6,836
2004-04-02	K-1 MAX Portugal 2004	Lisbon, Portugal	Sport Palace Paz e Amizade	5,500
2004-03-27	K-1 World Grand Prix 2004 in Saitama	Saitama, Japan	Saitama Super Arena	14,918
2004-03-21	K-1 MAX Scotland 2004	Renfrew, Scotland	The Normandy Hotel	
2004-03-14	K-1 Beast 2004 in Niigata	Niigata, Japan	Toki Messe	9,413
2004-02-24	K-1 World MAX 2004 Japan Tournament	Tokyo, Japan	Yoyogi National Gymnasium	4,860
2004-02-22	K-1 Battle of Britain 2004	Wolverhampton, England	Civic Center	
2004-02-15	K-1 Burning 2004	Ginowan, Okinawa, Japan	Okinawa Convention Center	5,844
2004-02-14	K-1 Scandinavia 2004 World Qualification	Stockholm, Sweden	Solnahallen	3,000
2004-01-24	K-1 Marseilles 2004 World Qualification	Marseille, France	Salle Vallier	3,500

=== 2003 events ===
Date	Event	Location	Venue	Attendance
2003-12-31	K-1 PREMIUM 2003 Dynamite!!	Nagoya, Japan	Nagoya Dome	43,500
2003-12-20	K-1 Spain Grand Prix 2003 in Barcelona	Barcelona, Spain	Barcelona Olympic Hall	3,500
2003-12-06	K-1 World Grand Prix 2003 Final	Tokyo, Japan	Tokyo Dome	67,320
2003-11-27	K-1 MMA in Brazil	São Paulo, Brazil	Circulo Militar Arena	3,000
2003-11-18	K-1 World MAX 2003 Champions' Challenge	Tokyo, Japan	Nippon Budokan	9,250
2003-11-09	K-1 UK MAX 2003	Birmingham, England	Aston Villa Leisure Centre	
2003-11-07	K-1 New Zealand 2003	Auckland, New Zealand	ASB Stadium	
2003-10-31	K-1 Final Fight Stars War in Zagreb	Zagreb, Croatia	Dom Sportova	
2003-10-11	K-1 World Grand Prix 2003 Final Elimination	Osaka, Japan	Osaka Dome	31,700
2003-09-21	K-1 Survival 2003 Japan Grand Prix Final	Yokohama, Japan	Yokohama Arena	10,200
2003-08-29	K-1 Grand Prix BIH 2003	Novi Travnik, Bosnia-Herzegovina	Kralja Koloseuma	2,500
2003-08-15	K-1 World Grand Prix 2003 in Las Vegas II	Las Vegas	Bellagio	5,800
2003-07-27	K-1 World Grand Prix 2003 in Melbourne	Melbourne	Melbourne Town Hall	3,800
2003-07-13	K-1 World Grand Prix 2003 in Fukuoka	Fukuoka, Japan	Marine Messe Fukuoka	10,800
2003-07-05	K-1 World MAX 2003 World Tournament Final	Saitama, Japan	Saitama Super Arena	15,600
2003-06-29	K-1 Beast II 2003	Saitama, Japan	Saitama Super Arena	13,600
2003-06-14	K-1 World Grand Prix 2003 in Paris	Paris, France	Palais Omnisports de Paris-Bercy	11,200
2003-06-14	K-1 Germany 2003	Bergheim, Germany		600
2003-05-30	K-1 World Grand Prix 2003 in Basel	Basel, Switzerland	St. Jakobshalle	11,200
2003-05-28	K-1 World Grand Prix 2003 Preliminary Moscow	Moscow, Russia	Krylia Sovetov Hall	
2003-05-10	K-1 World Grand Prix 2003 Preliminary Milan	Milan, Italy	Mazda Palace	7,000
2003-05-02	K-1 World Grand Prix 2003 in Las Vegas	Las Vegas	The Mirage	5,385
2003-04-13	K-1 World Grand Prix 2003 Preliminary UK	Birmingham, England	Aston Villa Leisure Centre	
2003-04-11	K-1 Lord of the Rings	Auckland, New Zealand	ASB Stadium	
2003-04-06	K-1 Beast 2003	Yamagata, Japan	Yamagata Sports Center	4,645
2003-04-06	K-1 World Grand Prix 2003 Preliminary Holland	Zoetermeer, Netherlands	Silverdome	3,000
2003-03-30	K-1 World Grand Prix 2003 in Saitama	Saitama, Japan	Saitama Super Arena	22,320
2003-03-15	K-1 World Grand Prix 2003 Preliminary Scandinavia	Stockholm, Sweden	Solnahallen	
2003-03-01	K-1 World MAX 2003 Japan Grand Prix	Tokyo, Japan	Ariake Coliseum	9,420
2003-02-23	K-1 World Grand Prix 2003 Preliminary Brazil	São Paulo, Brazil	Maksoud Plaza Hotel	1,000
2003-02-22	K-1 ~ Ichigeki : Kyokushin vs K-1 All Out Battle 2003 ~	Tokyo, Japan	Nippon Budokan	7,596
2003-02-18	K-1 No Respect 2003	Melbourne	Melbourne Arena	10,000
2003-01-24	K-1 World Grand Prix 2003 Preliminary France	Marseille, France	Salle Vallier	

=== 2002 events ===
Date	Event	Location	Venue	Attendance
2002-12-14	K-1 Spain MAX 2002	Barcelona, Spain	Pavelló Olímpic de Badalona	5,200
2002-12-07	K-1 World Grand Prix 2002 Final	Tokyo, Japan	Tokyo Dome	74,500
2002-12-07	K-1 Bassano 2002	Bassano del Grappa, Italy	Palazzetto dello Sport	2,000
2002-11-26	K-1 Oceania MAX 2002	Melbourne, Australia	Melbourne Town Hall	3,500
2002-11-17	K-1 UK MAX 2002	Birmingham, England	Aston Villa Leisure Centre	
2002-11-08	K-1 New Zealand 2002	Auckland, New Zealand	ASB Stadium	3,500
2002-10-11	K-1 World MAX 2002 Champions' Challenge	Tokyo, Japan	Ariake Coliseum	7,548
2002-10-05	K-1 World Grand Prix 2002 Final Elimination	Saitama, Japan	Saitama Super Arena	20,200
2002-10-01	K-1 World MAX 2002 Preliminary Brazil	São Paulo, Brazil	São Paulo Infinity Club	11,500
2002-09-28	K-1 Germany 2002	Krefeld, Germany	Glockenspitzhalle	1,000
2002-09-22	K-1 Andy Spirits Japan GP 2002 Final	Osaka, Japan	Osaka-jō Hall	11,500
2002-08-28	K-1 PREMIUM 2002 Dynamite!!	Tokyo, Japan	Olympic Stadium	91,107
2002-08-17	K-1 World Grand Prix 2002 in Las Vegas	Las Vegas	Bellagio	6,400
2002-07-14	K-1 World Grand Prix 2002 in Fukuoka	Fukuoka, Japan	Marine Messe	11,800
2002-06-07	K-1 Africa Grand Prix 2002	Pretoria, South Africa	North Park Mall	
2002-06-02	K-1 Survival 2002	Toyama, Japan	Toyama Gymnasium	8,650
2002-05-25	K-1 World Grand Prix 2002 in Paris	Paris, France	Palais Omnisports de Paris-Bercy	10,200
2002-05-11	K-1 World MAX 2002 World Tournament Final	Tokyo, Japan	Nippon Budokan	8,450
2002-05-04	K-1 Ukraine Grand Prix 2002	Kyiv, Ukraine	Kyiv Sport Palace	3,000
2002-05-03	K-1 USA Grand Prix 2002	Las Vegas	The Mirage	
2002-04-21	K-1 Burning 2002	Hiroshima, Japan	Hiroshima Sun Plaza	6,000
2002-04-20	K-1 Italy Grand Prix 2002	Milan, Italy	Milan Pavilion	8,000
2002-04-13	K-1 Spain Grand Prix 2002	Madrid, Spain	Madrid Arena	5,000
2002-04-13	K-1 Croatia Grand Prix 2002	Zagreb, Croatia	Dom Sportova	8,000
2002-03-24	K-1 UK Grand Prix 2002	Birmingham, England	Aston Villa Leisure Center	2,300
2002-03-15	K-1 World MAX 2002 USA	Denver, Colorado	Radisson Graystone Castle Hotel	
2002-03-03	K-1 World Grand Prix 2002 in Nagoya	Nagoya, Japan	Rainbow Hall	10,000
2002-02-24	K-1 Netherlands Grand Prix 2002	Arnhem, Netherlands	Rijnhal	6,000
2002-02-18	K-1 Oceania Grand Prix 2002	Melbourne, Australia	Crown Casino Showroom	2,100
2002-02-11	K-1 Japan MAX 2002	Tokyo, Japan	Yoyogi National Gymnasium	4,350
2002-02-09	K-1 North America Grand Prix 2002	Milwaukee, Wisconsin	Eagles Club	
2002-01-27	K-1 Rising 2002	Shizuoka, Japan	Granship	5,500
2002-01-25	K-1 France Grand Prix 2002	Marseille, France	Palais des Sports	

=== 2001 events ===
Date	Event	Location	Venue	Attendance
2001-12-08	K-1 World Grand Prix 2001 Final	Tokyo, Japan	Tokyo Dome	65,000
2001-12-01	K-1 World Grand Prix 2001 Preliminary Prague	Prague, Czech Republic	Hilton Prague	
2001-11-11	K-1 Oceania MAX 2001	Melbourne	Crown Casino Showroom	2,200
2001-10-08	K-1 World Grand Prix 2001 in Fukuoka	Fukuoka, Japan	Marine Messe	12,100
2001-08-19	K-1 Andy Memorial 2001 Japan GP Final	Saitama, Japan	Saitama Super Arena	18,200
2001-08-11	K-1 World Grand Prix 2001 in Las Vegas	Las Vegas	Bellagio	5,800
2001-08-05	K-1 Oceania 2001	Melbourne	Crown Casino Showroom	
2001-07-21	K-1 New Zealand Grand Prix 2001	Auckland, New Zealand	ASB Stadium	
2001-07-20	K-1 World Grand Prix 2001 in Nagoya	Nagoya, Japan	Nagoya Rainbow Hall	9,000
2001-06-24	K-1 Ukraine Grand Prix 2001	Lugansk, Ukraine	The Circus	2,300
2001-06-24	K-1 Survival 2001	Sendai, Japan	Sendai Grandy 21	8,800
2001-06-16	K-1 World Grand Prix 2001 in Melbourne	Melbourne	Melbourne Arena	10,000
2001-06-09	K-1 Scandinavia Grand Prix 2001	Copenhagen, Denmark	Valbyhallen	
2001-06-08	K-1 South Africa Grand Prix 2001	Cape Town, South Africa	Grand West Casino Ice Rink	3,500
2001-05-20	K-1 Germany Grand Prix 2001	Oberhausen, Germany	Oberhausen Arena	7,200
2001-05-05	K-1 USA Grand Prix 2001	Las Vegas	The Mirage	
2001-04-29	K-1 World Grand Prix 2001 in Osaka	Osaka, Japan	Osaka-jō Hall	12,000
2001-04-21	K-1 Italy Grand Prix 2001	Milan, Italy	Paravobis Arena	7,200
2001-04-15	K-1 Burning 2001	Kumamoto, Japan	Aqua Dome	7,000
2001-03-17	K-1 Gladiators 2001	Yokohama, Japan	Yokohama Arena	16,800
2001-02-24	K-1 Oceania 2001 Final Tournament	Melbourne	Crown Casino Showroom	2,000
2001-02-04	K-1 Holland GP 2001 in Arnhem	Arnhem, Netherlands	Rijnhal	7,000
2001-01-30	K-1 Rising 2001	Matsuyama, Japan	Matsuyama City Community Center	4,300

=== 2000 events ===
Date	Event	Location	Venue	Attendance
2000-12-22	K-1 Czech 2000	Prague, Czech Republic		
2000-12-10	K-1 World Grand Prix 2000 Final	Tokyo, Japan	Tokyo Dome	70,200
2000-11-19	K-1 UK Global Heat 2000	Birmingham, England	Aston Villa Leisure Center	3,000
2000-11-19	K-1 Oceania Star Wars 2000	Melbourne, Australia	Festival Hall	4,000
2000-11-10	K-1 New Zealand 2000	Auckland, New Zealand	Logan Campbell Centre	
2000-11-01	K-1 J-MAX 2000	Tokyo, Japan		2,650
2000-10-22	K-1 New South Wales 2000	Sydney, Australia	University of New South Wales	
2000-10-13	K-1 Queensland 2000	Brisbane, Australia		
2000-10-09	K-1 World Grand Prix 2000 in Fukuoka	Fukuoka, Japan	Marine Messe	10,800
2000-09-10	K-1 Oceania Dream	Melbourne, Australia	Crown Casino Ballroom	
2000-09-03	K-1 Africa Grand Prix 2000	Cape Town, South Africa		
2000-09-01	K-1 Grand Prix Europe 2000	Zagreb, Croatia	Dom Sportova	5,000
2000-08-20	K-1 World Grand Prix 2000 in Yokohama	Yokohama, Japan	Yokohama Arena	15,200
2000-08-05	K-1 USA Championships 2000	Las Vegas		5,400
2000-07-30	K-1 World Grand Prix 2000 in Nagoya	Nagoya, Japan	Rainbow Hall	10,000
2000-07-07	K-1 Spirits 2000	Sendai, Japan	Rainbow Hall	10,500
2000-06-24	K-1 Belarus Grand Prix 2000	Minsk, Belarus		
2000-06-03	K-1 Fight Night 2000	Zürich, Switzerland	Hallenstadion	14,000
2000-05-28	K-1 Survival 2000	Sapporo, Japan	Makomanai Ice Arena	9,200
2000-05-20	K-1 The Best of German Heavyweight	Duisburg, Germany		
2000-05-14	K-1 Revenge Oceania	Melbourne, Australia	Crown Casino Ballroom	2,000
2000-05-12	K-1 King of the Ring 2000	Bologna, Italy		
2000-04-23	K-1 The Millennium	Osaka, Japan	Osaka Dome	30,082
2000-04-16	K-1 UK Battle of Britain 2000	Birmingham, England		2,160
2000-03-19	K-1 Burning 2000	Yokohama, Japan	Yokohama Arena	11,800
2000-02-27	K-1 Grand Prix 2000 Oceania	Melbourne, Australia	Crown Casino Ballroom	2,000
2000-01-25	K-1 Rising 2000	Nagasaki, Japan		6,100

=== 1999 events ===
Date	Event	Location	Venue	Attendance
1999-12-05	K-1 Grand Prix '99 final round	Tokyo, Japan	Tokyo Dome	58,200
1999-10-03	K-1 World Grand Prix '99 opening round	Osaka, Japan	Osaka Dome	32,800
1999-08-22	K-1 Spirits '99	Tokyo, Japan	Ariake Coliseum	10,370
1999-07-18	K-1 Dream '99	Nagoya, Japan	Rainbow Hall	10,000
1999-06-20	K-1 Braves '99	Fukuoka, Japan	Marine Messe	13,580
1999-06-06	K-1 Survival '99	Sapporo, Japan	Makomanai Ice Arena	11,000
1999-06-05	K-1 Fight Night '99	Zürich, Switzerland	Hallenstadion	12,000
1999-04-25	K-1 Revenge '99	Yokohama, Japan	Yokohama Arena	16,800
1999-03-22	K-1 The Challenge '99	Tokyo, Japan	Yoyogi National Gymnasium	5,000
1999-02-03	K-1 Rising Sun '99	Tokyo, Japan	Yoyogi National Gymnasium	5,500

=== 1998 events ===
Date	Event	Location	Venue	Attendance
1998-12-13	K-1 Grand Prix '98 Final Round	Tokyo, Japan	Tokyo Dome	65,800
1998-10-28	K-1 Japan '98 Kamikaze	Tokyo, Japan	Yoyogi National Gymnasium	4,900
1998-09-27	K-1 World Grand Prix '98 Opening Round	Osaka, Japan	Osaka Dome	38,820
1998-08-28	K-1 Japan Grand Prix '98	Tokyo, Japan	Yoyogi National Gymnasium	4,800
1998-08-07	K-1 USA Grand Prix '98	Las Vegas	The Mirage	6,000
1998-07-18	K-1 Dream '98	Nagoya, Japan	Nagoya Dome	33,984
1998-06-06	K-1 Fight Night '98	Zürich, Switzerland	Hallenstadion	12,500
1998-05-24	K-1 Braves '98	Fukuoka, Japan	Marine Messe	13,780
1998-04-09	K-1 Kings '98	Yokohama, Japan	Yokohama Arena	16,800

=== 1997 events ===
Date	Event	Location	Venue	Attendance
1997-11-09	K-1 Grand Prix '97 Final	Tokyo, Japan	Tokyo Dome	54,500
1997-09-07	K-1 Grand Prix '97 1st Round	Osaka, Japan	Osaka Dome	38,200
1997-07-20	K-1 Dream '97	Nagoya, Japan	Nagoya Dome	36,500
1997-06-07	K-1 Fight Night '97	Zürich, Switzerland	Hallenstadion	12,800
1997-04-29	K-1 Braves '97	Fukuoka, Japan	Marine Messe	12,000
1997-03-16	K-1 Kings '97	Yokohama, Japan	Yokohama Arena	17,800

=== 1996 events ===
Date	Event	Location	Venue	Attendance
1996-12-08	K-1 Hercules '96	Nagoya, Japan	Rainbow Hall	10,000
1996-10-18	K-1 Star Wars '96	Yokohama, Japan	Yokohama Arena	17,500
1996-09-01	K-1 Revenge '96	Osaka, Japan	Osaka-jō Hall	13,000
1996-06-02	K-1 Fight Night II	Zürich, Switzerland	Hallenstadion	12,800
1996-05-06	K-1 Grand Prix '96	Yokohama, Japan	Yokohama Arena	17,850
1996-03-10	K-1 Grand Prix '96 Opening Battle	Yokohama, Japan	Yokohama Arena	16,850

=== 1995 events ===
Date	Event	Location	Venue	Attendance
1995-12-09	K-1 Hercules	Nagoya, Japan	Rainbow Hall	10,000
1995-09-03	K-1 Revenge II	Yokohama, Japan	Yokohama Arena	17,500
1995-07-16	K-3 Grand Prix '95	Nagoya, Japan	Rainbow Hall	9,988
1995-06-10	K-1 Fight Night	Zürich, Switzerland	Hallenstadion	12,000
1995-05-04	K-1 Grand Prix '95	Tokyo, Japan	Yoyogi National Gymnasium	13,500
1995-03-25	K-1 K-League Opening Fight	Tokyo, Japan	Korakuen Hall	
1995-03-03	K-1 Grand Prix '95 Opening Battle	Tokyo, Japan	Nippon Budokan	13,500
1995-01-07	K-2 France Grand Prix '95	Paris, France		

=== 1994 events ===
Date	Event	Location	Venue	Attendance
1994-12-10	K-1 Legend	Nagoya, Japan	Rainbow Hall	9,550
1994-09-18	K-1 Revenge	Yokohama, Japan	Yokohama Arena	14,000
1994-05-08	K-2 Plus Tournament 1994	Amsterdam, Netherlands	Jaap Edenhal	
1994-04-30	K-1 Grand Prix '94	Tokyo, Japan	Yoyogi National Gymnasium	11,000
1994-03-04	K-1 Challenge	Tokyo, Japan	Nippon Budokan	15,000

=== 1993 events ===
Date	Event	Location	Venue	Attendance
1993-12-29	K-2 Grand Prix '93	Tokyo, Japan	Ryōgoku Kokugikan	11,000
1993-11-15	K-1 Andy's Glove	Tokyo, Japan	Korakuen Hall	2,100
1993-10-02	K-1 Illusion 1993 Karate World Cup	Osaka, Japan	Osaka Prefectural Gymnasium	
1993-09-04	K-1 Illusion	Tokyo, Japan	Nippon Budokan	13,500
1993-06-25	K-1 Sanctuary III	Osaka, Japan	Osaka Prefectural Gymnasium	6,000
1993-04-30	K-1 Grand Prix '93	Tokyo, Japan	Yoyogi National Gymnasium	12,000
1993-03-30	K-1 Sanctuary I	Tokyo, Japan	Korakuen Hall	2,100

== See also ==
- List of K-1 champions
- List of It's Showtime (kickboxing) events
