= Matthias Hofbauer =

Swiss floorball player

- Born: 22 May 1981 (age 44) Kirchberg, Switzerland
- Position: Forward
- Shot: Right
- Played for: SV Wiler-Ersigen; Jönköpings IK; IBK Dalen
- National team: Switzerland
- Playing career: 1994–2020

Medal record

Representing Switzerland

Floorball

World Championships
Bronze medal – third place	2000 Oslo	
Bronze medal – third place	2002 Helsinki	
Bronze medal – third place	2006 Stockholm	
Bronze medal – third place	2008 Prague	
Bronze medal – third place	2012 Zurych	

Matthias Hofbauer (born 22 May 1981) is a former Swiss professional floorball forward who has been playing for the SV Wiler-Ersigen of the Nationalliga A.

His younger brother Christoph is floorball player.

== International play ==
Hofbauer has represented his country 45 times. He played his first game for the national team in 2000. At the 2004 World Championships, where Switzerland loss in the bronze medal game, Hofbauer was named best forward and a member of the all-star team; he was the tournament's leading scorer.

== Career statistics ==
=== International ===
Year	Team	Event	Result	GP	G	A	Pts	PIM
2000	Switzerland	WC	3rd place, bronze medalist(s)	4	0	1	1	0
2002	Switzerland	WC	3rd place, bronze medalist(s)	6	2	2	4	0
2004	Switzerland	WC	4th	6	11	11	22	0
2006	Switzerland	WC	3rd place, bronze medalist(s)	6	3	6	9	0
2008	Switzerland	WC	3rd place, bronze medalist(s)	6	2	0	2	2
2010	Switzerland	WC	4th	6	12	8	20	0
2012	Switzerland	WC	3rd place, bronze medalist(s)	6	11	11	22	0
2014	Switzerland	WC	4th	6	2	1	3	2
Senior totals				45	43	40	83	4
