= Niklas Jihde =

Swedish former floorball player (born 1976)

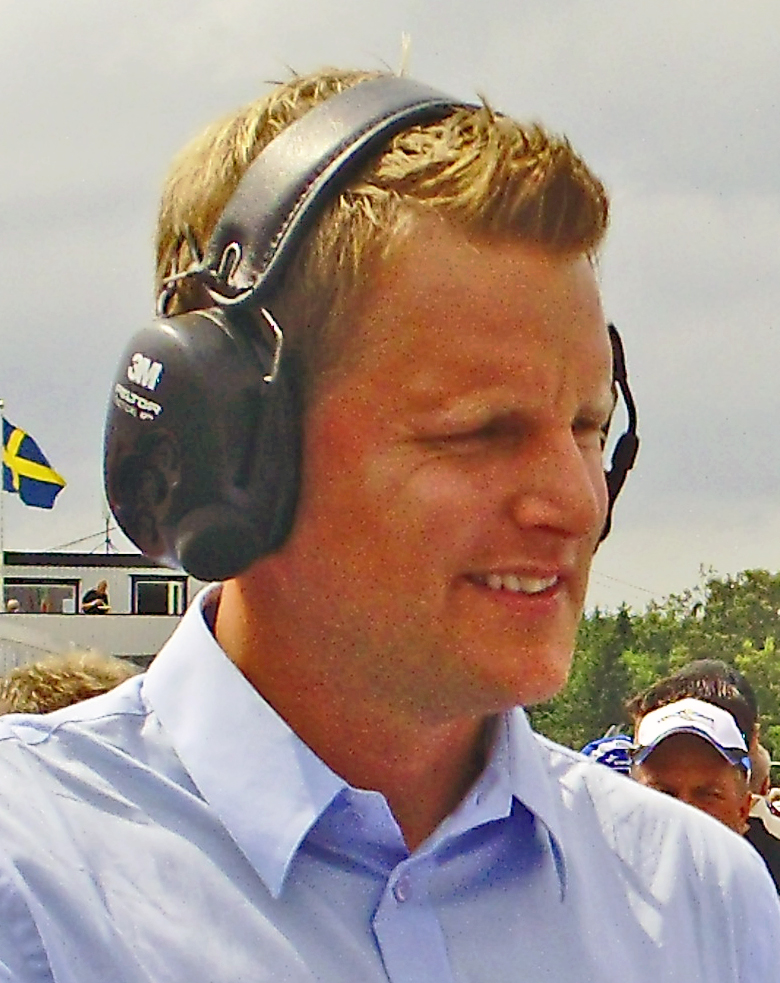
Niklas Jihde, 2011.

Niklas Jihde (born 19 June 1976 in Uppåkra, Sweden) is a Swedish former floorball player. Jihde has won the Floorball World Championship with Sweden five times, in 1998, 2000, 2002, 2004, and 2006. He scored 80 goals with the Swedish national floorball team.

Since 2005, Jihde has been ranked as a 2nd world's best floorball player by Innebandymagazinet behind Finnish phenomenon Mika Kohonen.
