= Swiss Arena =

Sports arena in Zürich, Switzerland

SWISS Arena
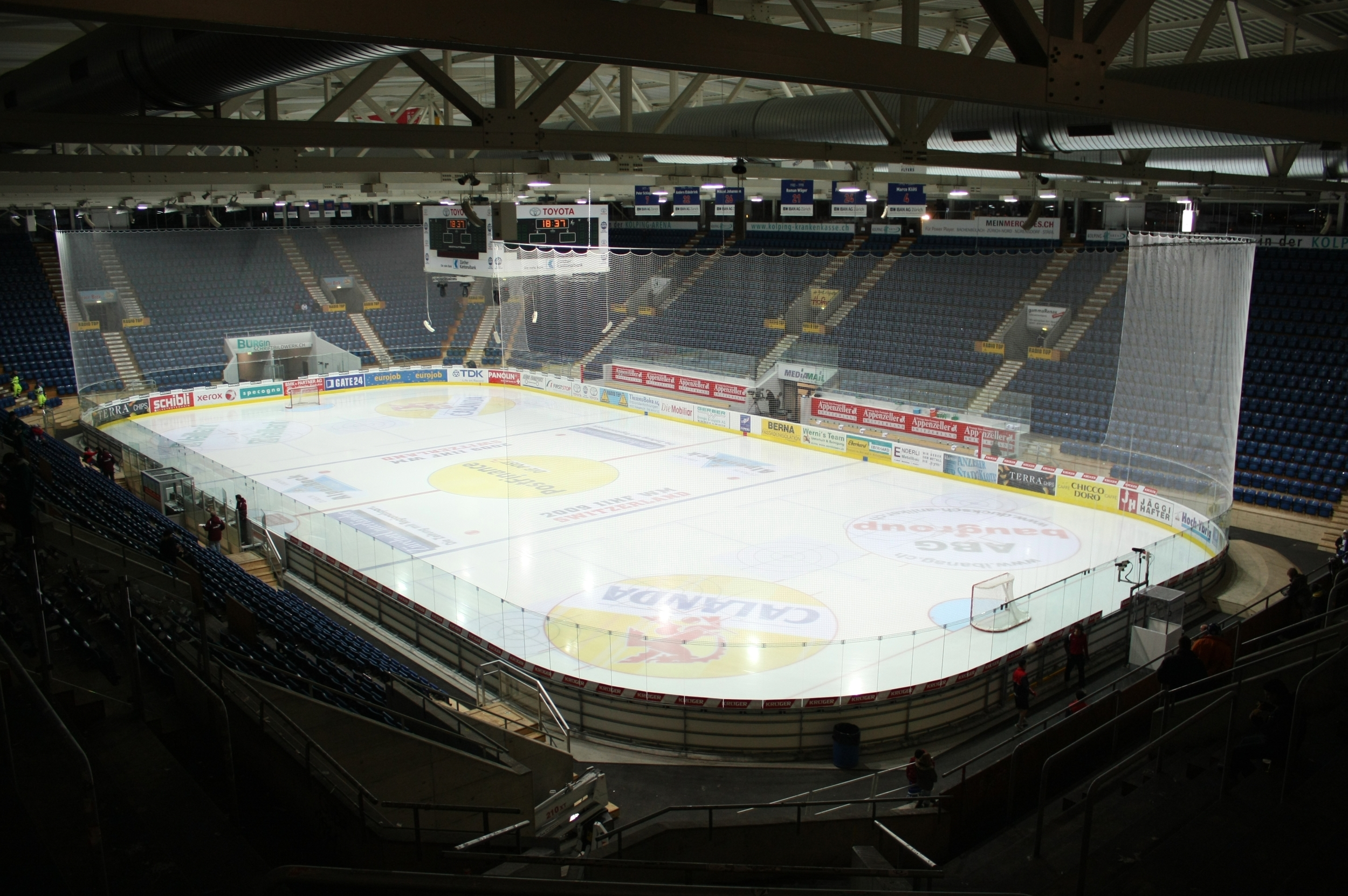
- The arena in 2009
- Interactive map of SWISS Arena
- Former names: Eishalle Schluefweg; Kolping Arena; Stimo Arena
- Location: Kloten, Switzerland
- Coordinates: 47.442°N 8.584°E
- Capacity: 7,624

Construction
- Opened: 1952
- Renovated: 1977, 1982, 1997, 2008

SWISS Arena is an indoor arena in Kloten, Switzerland. It is primarily used for ice hockey and is the home arena of the Kloten Flyers. In 2008 the Eishalle Schluefweg was renamed Kolping Arena due to a sponsoring deal. In 2015 it was then again renamed to Swiss Arena. The Swiss Arena holds 7,624 people and was renovated in 1997. In 2004, the arena played host to the finals of the 2004 Men's World Floorball Championships and in 2009 it was one of the hosts of the IIHF World Championships.

== See also ==
- List of indoor arenas in Switzerland
