= Ainārs Juškēvičs =

Latvian floorball player

Personal information
- Nationality: Latvia
- Born: July 13, 1981 (age 45) Riga, Latvian SSR
- Height: 5 ft 11 in (180 cm)
- Weight: 187 lb (85 kg)

Sport
- Sport: Floorball
- Position: Centre
- Shoots: Right
- League: ME
- Team: SK Lauku Avīze; RTU/Inspecta; Ulbroka/FS Masters (current)
- Turned pro: 1998

Ainārs Juškēvičs (born 13 July 1981 in Riga, Latvian SSR) is a professional Latvian floorball player.
