= 2004 Men's World Floorball Championships =

Floorball competition

2004 Men's WorldFloorball Championships
A-Division

Tournament details
- Host country: Switzerland
- Venues: 2 (in 2 host cities)
- Dates: 16–23 May 2004
- Teams: 10

Final positions
- Champions: Sweden
- Runners-up: Czech Republic
- Third place: Finland

Tournament statistics
- Scoring leader(s): (Switzerland) Matthias Hofbauer

The 2024 Men's World Floorball Championships was the fifth World Championships in men's floorball. It was held in May 2004 in Switzerland.

Starting with this edition, Division A was expanded to 10 teams.

As in all previous Men's World Championships, Sweden won their fifth title after defeating Czechia. For the Czech team, it was their first second-place finish and first-ever medal. This achievement was not matched until 18 years later at the 2022 World Championship.

== Preliminary round ==
=== Group A ===
Team	Pld	W	D	L	GF	GA	GD	Pts
Sweden	4	4	0	0	65	6	+59	8
Czech Republic	4	3	0	1	37	11	+26	6
Norway	4	2	0	2	43	30	+13	4
Germany	4	1	0	3	13	65	−52	2
Austria	4	0	0	4	6	52	−46	0

May 16, 2004

Czech Republic	20–1	Germany

Saalsporthalle, Zurich

Austria	1–17	Norway

Saalsporthalle, Zurich

May 17, 2004

Germany	9–2	Austria

Saalsporthalle, Zurich

Sweden	4–1	Czech Republic

Saalsporthalle, Zurich

May 18, 2004

Czech Republic	7–2	Austria

Saalsporthalle, Zurich

Norway	4–17	Sweden

Saalsporthalle, Zurich

May 19, 2004

Norway	4–9	Czech Republic

Saalsporthalle, Zurich

Sweden	25–0	Germany

Saalsporthalle, Zurich

May 20, 2004

Germany	3–18	Norway

Saalsporthalle, Zurich

Austria	1–19	Sweden

Saalsporthalle, Zurich

=== Group B ===
Team	Pld	W	D	L	GF	GA	GD	Pts
Switzerland	4	4	0	0	33	12	+21	8
Finland	4	3	0	1	49	7	+42	6
Latvia	4	1	0	3	15	25	−10	2
Russia	4	1	0	3	13	36	−23	2
Denmark	4	1	0	3	14	44	−30	2

May 16, 2004

Switzerland	4–3	Latvia

Eishalle Schluefweg, Zurich

Russia	6–7	Denmark

Eishalle Schluefweg, Zurich

May 17, 2004

Finland	16–1	Russia

Eishalle Schluefweg, Zurich

Denmark	4–15	Switzerland

Eishalle Schluefweg, Zurich

May 18, 2004

Latvia	2–14	Finland

Eishalle Schluefweg, Zurich

Russia	2–10	Switzerland

Eishalle Schluefweg, Zurich

May 19, 2004

Latvia	3–4	Russia

Eishalle Schluefweg, Zurich

Finland	16–0	Denmark

Eishalle Schluefweg, Zurich

May 20, 2004

Denmark	3–7	Latvia

Eishalle Schluefweg, Zurich

Switzerland	4–3	Finland

Eishalle Schluefweg, Zurich

== Placement round ==
=== 9th place match ===
May 21, 2004

Austria	4–6	Denmark
	Game reference

Eishalle Schluefweg, Zurich

=== 7th place match ===
May 21, 2004

Germany	5–10	Russia
	Game reference

Eishalle Schluefweg, Zurich

=== 5th place match ===
May 21, 2004

Norway	6–4	Latvia
	Game reference

Eishalle Schluefweg, Zurich

== Final round ==
Semifinals
A1	Sweden	5
B2	Finland	3
B1	Switzerland	3
A2	Czech Republic	5

Finals
A1	Sweden	6
A2	Czech Republic	4

=== Semi-finals ===
May 22, 2004

Sweden	5–3	Finland
	Game reference

Eishalle Schluefweg, Zurich

Switzerland	3–5	Czech Republic
	Game reference

Eishalle Schluefweg, Zurich

=== Bronze medal match ===
May 23, 2004

Finland	8–7 SO	Switzerland
	Game reference

Eishalle Schluefweg, Zurich

=== Championship match ===
May 23, 2004

Sweden	6–4	Czech Republic
	Game reference

Eishalle Schluefweg, Zurich

== Leading scorers ==
Player		GP	G	A	PTS	PIM
(Switzerland)	Matthias Hofbauer	6	11	11	22	0
(Sweden)	Niklas Jihde	6	12	8	20	2
(Switzerland)	Christoph Hofbauer	6	10	5	15	0
(Sweden)	Anders Hellgård	6	7	8	15	2
(Finland)	Tero Karppanen	6	10	4	14	2
(Norway)	Raymond Evensen	5	8	6	14	0
(Finland)	Mika Kohonen	4	1	13	14	0
(Norway)	Willy Fauskanger	5	7	6	13	12
(Czech Republic)	Aleš Zálesný	6	7	5	12	4
(Sweden)	Henrik Quist	6	5	7	12	2
(Finland)	Jari-Pekka Lehtonen	6	5	7	12	0

== Ranking ==
Official rankings according to the IFF:

Rk.	Team
1st place, gold medalist(s)	Sweden
2nd place, silver medalist(s)	Czech Republic
3rd place, bronze medalist(s)	Finland
4.	Switzerland
5.	Norway
6.	Latvia
7.	Russia
8.	Germany
9.	Denmark
10.	Austria

== All-star team ==
- Goalkeeper: (Finland) Henri Toivoniemi
- Defence: (Finland) Jari-Pekka Lehtonen, (Sweden) Jakob Olofsson
- Forward: (Switzerland) Matthias Hofbauer, (Sweden) Niklas Jihde, (Finland) Mika Kohonen

== See also ==
- 2004 Men's World Floorball Championships B-Division
- 2004 Men's World Floorball Championships C-Division
