= 2002 Men's World Floorball Championships =

Floorball competition

- Official Logo of the championships

Tournament details
- Host country: Finland
- Venue: 1 (in 1 host city)
- Dates: 18–25 May 2002
- Teams: 8

Final positions
- Champions: Sweden
- Runners-up: Finland
- Third place: Switzerland

Tournament statistics
- Matches played: 24
- Goals scored: 227 (9.46 per match)
- Scoring leader(s): (Sweden) Johan Andersson (18 points)

Awards
- MVP: (Sweden) Johan Andersson

The 2002 Men's World Floorball Championships were the fourth World Championships in men's floorball. It was held from 18–25 May 2002 in Finland.

As in all previous Men's World Championships, Sweden won for the fourth time after defeating Finland. The Swiss team won bronze after defeating the Czech Republic.

== Venues ==
Helsinki
Hartwall Arena	Helsinki Ice Hall

== Preliminary round ==
=== Group A ===
Team	Pld	W	D	L	GF	GA	GD	Pts
Sweden	3	3	0	0	46	3	+43	6
Norway	3	2	0	1	13	17	−4	4
Denmark	3	1	0	2	8	20	−12	2
Germany	3	0	0	3	4	31	−27	0

18 May 2002	Sweden	15–2	Denmark	Hartwall Areena, Helsinki

Henrik Quist 15.31; Jonathan Kronstrand 25.23; Niklas Jihde 28.57; Johannes Gustafsson 29.14; Henrik Quist 35.05; Peder Bodén 36.59; Mathias Larsson 37.20; Johan Andersson 39.17; Johan Andersson 41.56; Mathias Larsson 42.36; Adam Grane 45.03; Anders Hellgård 46.17; Mattias Axelsson 48.42; Johan Andersson 53.59; Adam Grane 59.31 / Goals / Kim Olesen 15.08; Ronnie Graugaard 42.21

19 May 2002	Denmark	5–0	Germany	Hartwall Areena, Helsinki

Kim Olesen 00.54; Kennet Bork 28.22; Kennet Bork 38.15; Jesper Petersen 42.13; Tim Jaltoft 54.27 / Goals

Norway	0–13	Sweden	Hartwall Areena, Helsinki

Goals / Johan Andersson 01.52; Niklas Jihde 15.28; Johannes Gustafsson 19.32; Daniel Calebsson 19.58; Niklas Jihde 24.16; Anders Hellgård 27.22; Johan Andersson 29.27; Martin Olofsson 41.15; Martin Olofsson 41.34; Henrik Quist 44.21; Martin Olofsson 45.06; Henrik Quist 49.50; Niklas Jihde 57.07

20 May 2002	Norway	5–1	Denmark	Hartwall Areena, Helsinki

Willy Fauskanger 14.42; Lars Erik Sikkeland 37.33; Ketil Kronberg 43.55; Andreas Sletten 47.54; Raymond Evensen 58.14 / Goals / Kennet Bork 11.36

Sweden	18–1	Germany	Hartwall Areena, Helsinki

Henrik Lorendahl 10.13; Johannes Gustafsson 10.48; Johan Andersson 14.36; Johan Andersson 24.49; Joakim Lindström 27.17; Jonathan Kronstrand 33.21; Henrik Lorendahl 35.56; Johannes Gustafsson 36.45; Adam Grane 37.16; Henrik Lorendahl 38.12; Johan Andersson 39.19; Henrik Lorendahl 41.15; Joakim Lindström 42.00; Johan Andersson 46.16; Jonathan Kronstrand 51.20; Anders Hellgård 54.37; Joakim Bäckström 57.41; Peter Fischerström 59.48 / Goals / Kristian Holtz 29.26

21 May 2002	Norway	8–3	Germany	Hartwall Areena, Helsinki

Andreas Sletten 01.47; Stian Martinsen 17.16; Stian Martinsen 22.41; Stian Martinsen 24.50; Raymond Evensen 41.38; Raymond Evensen 49.55; Thomas Solheim 51.20; Andreas Sletten 51.32 / Goals / Kristian Holtz 04.05; Andreas Kasche 21.56; Fredrik Hartwig 48.18

=== Group B ===
Team	Pld	W	D	L	GF	GA	GD	Pts
Finland	3	2	0	1	19	5	+14	4
Czech Republic	3	2	0	1	14	10	+4	4
Switzerland	3	2	0	1	16	12	+4	4
Latvia	3	0	0	3	5	27	−22	0

18 May 2002	Finland	4–1	Switzerland	Hartwall Areena, Helsinki

Sami Kuronen 16.36; Jaakko Hintikka 20.47; Mikael Järvi 35.51; Juho Seppälä 41.48 / Goals / Adrian Capatt 57.31

19 May 2002	Finland	3–4	Czech Republic	Hartwall Areena, Helsinki

Sami Kuronen 28.08; Mikael Järvi 47.00; Janne Tähkä 59.33 / Goals / Michal Rohel 29.58; Petr Kozusnik 34.45; Jiri Jandácek 35.29; Ales Zálesný 45.58

Switzerland	9–4	Latvia	Hartwall Areena, Helsinki

Matthias Hofbauer 08.48; Daniel Telli 09.50; Michael Flury 14.38; Stefan Lüthi 20.28; Adrian Capatt 45.07; Samuel Dunkel 45.44; Adrian Capatt 50.50; Patrick Bachmann 57.02; Daniel Telli 57.26 / Goals / Andrejs Cvetkovs 07.07; Kristians Lisovskis 14.06; Kristians Lisovskis 15.44; Artis Malkavs 32.25

20 May 2002	Switzerland	6–4	Czech Republic	Hartwall Areena, Helsinki

Daniel Telli 17.00; Adrian Capatt 19.26; Stefan Lüthi 25.33; Rolf Kern 27.16; Matthias Hofbauer 42.46; Stefan Lüthi 58.03 / Goals / Tomás Trnavsky 19.53; Ales Jakubek 35.17; Radim Cepek 58.08; Radim Cepek 58.27

Latvia	0–12	Finland	Hartwall Areena, Helsinki

Goals / Janne Tähkä 06.38; Teppo Rantala 11.04; Tero Karppanen 11.28; Jussi Järvinen 21.21; Hannes Öhman 28.32; Tero Tiitu 32.23; Jaakko Hintikka 35.58; Hannes Öhman 37.47; Jari-Pekka Lehtonen 43.08; Tero Karppanen 43.41; Jori Isomäki 48.27; Tero Karppanen 53.25

21 May 2002	Czech Republic	6–1	Latvia	Hartwall Areena, Helsinki

Radek Sikora 13.46; Petr Kozusnik 20.43; Radim Cepek 31.55; Radim Cepek 43.02; Pavel Kozusnik 54.58; Michal Rohel 59.46 / Goals / Kristians Lisovskis 35.33

== Playoffs ==
Quarterfinals
A1	Sweden	16
B4	Latvia	0
A3	Denmark	4
B2	Czech Republic	5
B1	Finland	7
A4	Germany	1
A2	Norway	2
B3	Switzerland	3

Semifinals
A1	Sweden	7
B2	Czech Republic	1
B1	Finland	5
B3	Switzerland	1

Finals
A1	Sweden	6
B1	Finland	4

=== Quarter-finals ===
22 May 2002	Finland	7–1	Germany	Hartwall Areena, Helsinki

Game reference
Jori Isomäki 07.00; Teppo Rantala 12.16; Pasi Kotilainen 19.59; Juho Seppälä 38.09; Jaakko Hintikka 43.33; Teppo Rantala 51.50; Juho Seppälä 56.43 / Goals / Kristian Holtz 58.42

Switzerland	3–2	Norway	Hartwall Areena, Helsinki

Game reference
Daniel Aeschimann 03.51; Daniel Aeschimann 08.09; Daniel Aeschimann 45.33 / Goals / Lars Erik Sikkeland 09.05; Geir Nordseth 59.54

23 May 2002	Sweden	16–0	Latvia	Hartwall Areena, Helsinki

Game reference
Henrik Quist 00.33; Niklas Jihde 02.57; Martin Olofsson 03.13; Peder Bodén 08.14; Mathias Larsson 10.40; Johan Andersson 11.24; Henrik Quist 12.41; Per Svensson 16.30; Johan Davidsson 18.46; Johan Andersson 21.11; Henrik Lorendahl 26.42; Niklas Jihde 27.43; Johannes Gustafsson 32.59; Niklas Jihde 38.57; Mattias Axelsson 45.02; Johannes Gustafsson 59.07 / Goals

Denmark	4–5 OT	Czech Republic	Hartwall Areena, Helsinki

Game reference
Ronnie Graugaard 34.48; Ronnie Graugaard 48.50; Kennet Bork 57.43; Joakim Larsen 59.51 / Goals / Ales Zálesný 20.37; Jiri Jandácek 33.05; Radim Cepek 43.45; Michal Rohel 54.33; Pavel Kozusnik 67.17

=== Semi-finals ===
24 May 2002	Sweden	7–1	Czech Republic	Hartwall Areena, Helsinki

Game reference
Henrik Lorendahl 06.59; Johan Andersson 09.55; Mattias Axelsson 19.00; Johan Andersson 35.44; Anders Hellgård 45.39; Jonathan Kronstrand 50.03; Niklas Jihde 56.51 / Goals / Radim Cepek 53.43

Finland	5–1	Switzerland	Hartwall Areena, Helsinki

Game reference
Tero Karppanen 11.30; Mikael Järvi 17.02; Tero Karppanen 24.16; Jaakko Hintikka 27.22; Jaakko Hintikka 54.32 / Goals / Daniel Telli 06.43

=== Bronze medal match ===
25 May 2002	Czech Republic	3–4 OT	Switzerland	Hartwall Areena, Helsinki

Game reference
Tomás Trnavsky 35.33; Tomás Trnavsky 43.23; Daniel Folta 56.03 / Goals / Adrian Capatt 26.10; Daniel Aeschimann 26.41; Thomas Engel 29.12; Stefan Lüthi 63.19

=== Championship match ===
25 May 2002	Sweden	6–4	Finland	Hartwall Areena, Helsinki

Game reference
Mathias Larsson 10.50; Johan Andersson 15.07; Niklas Jihde 27.02; Martin Olofsson 51.06; Martin Olofsson 59.42; Martin Olofsson 59.59 / Goals / Mikael Järvi 04.06; Janne Tähkä 23.27; Mikael Järvi 49.10; Jaakko Hintikka 59.51

== Placement round ==
=== 5th–8th place matches ===
23 May 2002	Norway	8–2	Germany	Hartwall Areena, Helsinki

Game reference
Frank Kristoffersen 03.54; Erik Rasmussen 05.31; Per Kristian Fladset 08.51; Geir Vidar Pedersen 10.22; Lars Erik Sikkeland 27.33; Per Kristian Fladset 40.56; Raymond Evensen 42.35; Ketil Kronberg 47.03 / Goals / Kristian Holtz 00.39; Robert Blanke 19.36

24 May 2002	Latvia	1–4	Denmark	Hartwall Areena, Helsinki

Game reference
Kristians Lisovskis 36.53 / Goals / Ronnie Graugaard 18.17; Jesper Petersen 26.12; Jesper Petersen 34.48; Kim Olesen 58.50

=== 7th place match ===
25 May 2002	Germany	5–6 OT	Latvia	Hartwall Areena, Helsinki

Game reference
Dirk Winkler 14.04; Dirk Winkler 16.45; Robert Blanke 45.27; Robert Müller 52.26; Kristian Holtz 55.43 / Goals / Kristians Lisovskis 04.33; Janis Alps 09.55; Andrejs Cvetkovs 22.46; Dailis Skudritis 23.34; Kristians Lisovskis 32.29; Martins Jarohovics 66.43

=== 5th place match ===
24 May 2002	Norway	6–1	Denmark	Hartwall Areena, Helsinki

Game reference
Glen Evensen 11.55; Glen Evensen 14.09; Glen Evensen 17.27; Willy Fauskanger 20.13; Lars Erik Sikkeland 47.14; Willy Fauskanger 54.24 / Goals / Kim Olesen 39.27

== Leading scorers ==
Player		GP	G	A	PTS	PIM
(Sweden)	Johan Andersson	6	14	4	18	0
(Sweden)	Martin Olofsson	6	7	9	16	0
(Sweden)	Niklas Jihde	5	9	5	14	0
(Finland)	Jaakko Hintikka	6	6	5	11	0
(Sweden)	Johannes Gustafsson	6	6	5	11	0
(Sweden)	Henrik Quist	5	6	5	11	2
(Czech Republic)	Radim Cepek	6	6	5	11	2
(Sweden)	Jonathan Kronstrand	6	4	6	10	0
(Sweden)	Anders Hellgård	6	4	6	10	0
(Finland)	Juho Seppälä	6	3	6	9	2

== Awards and all-star team ==
- Goalkeeper: (Sweden) Mårten Blixt
- Defense: (Finland) Jari-Pekka Lehtonen, (Sweden) Henrik Qvist
- Forward: (Sweden) Johan Andersson, (Finland) Jaakko Hintikka, (Sweden) Martin Olofsson
- Most Valuable Player (MVP): (Sweden) Johan Andersson

== Rankings ==
Official rankings according to the IFF:

Rk.	Team
1st place, gold medalist(s)	Sweden
2nd place, silver medalist(s)	Finland
3rd place, bronze medalist(s)	Switzerland
4.	Czech Republic
5.	Norway
6.	Denmark
7.	Latvia
8.	Germany
