= Solnahallen =

Sports venue in Stockholm, Sweden

Coordinates: 59°21′32″N 17°59′20″E

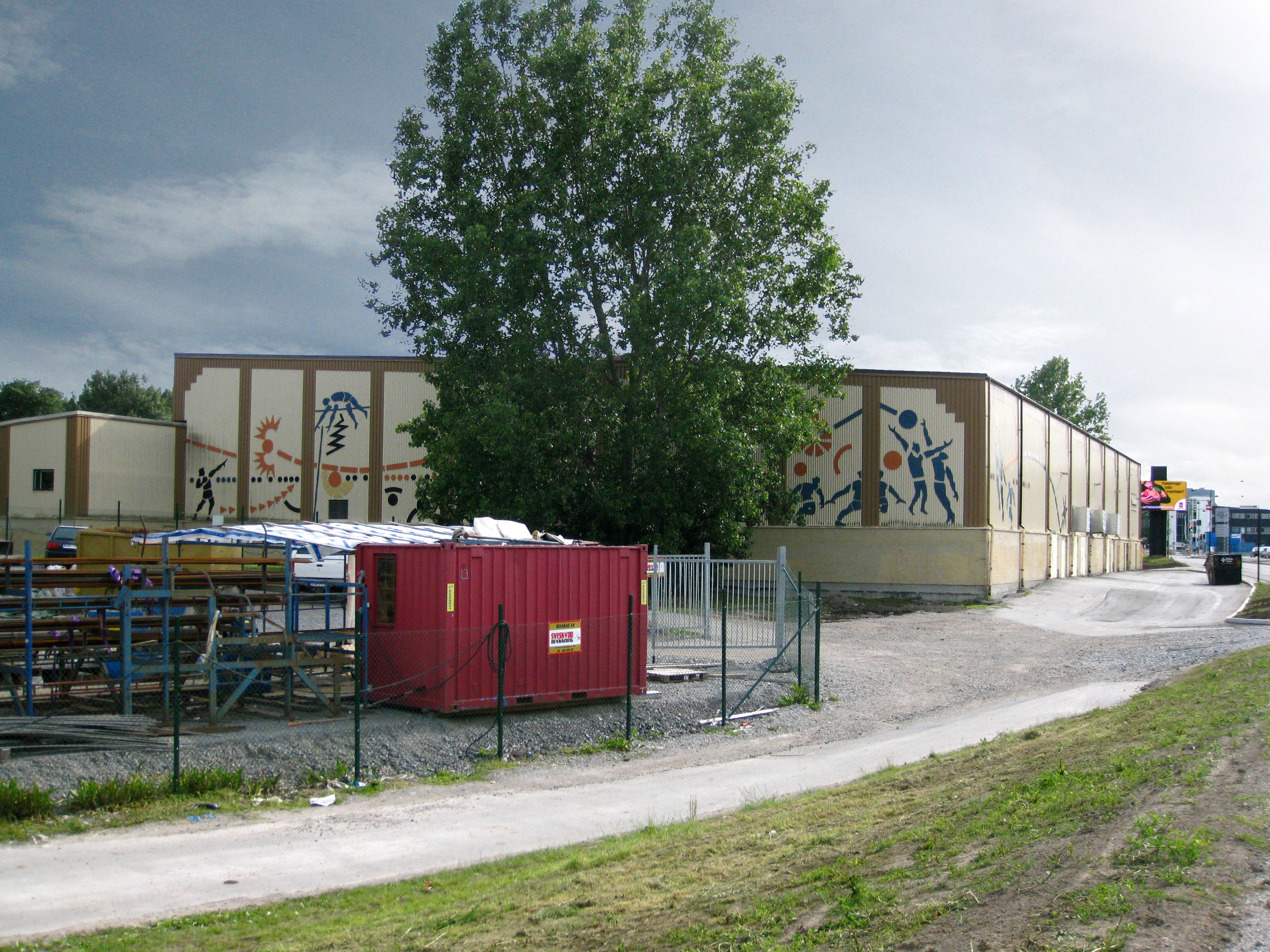
Solnahallen

Solnahallen is a 2,000-capacity indoor arena located in Stockholm, Sweden. It served as the home arena for the Solna Vikings.

The music video for the song "The Final Countdown" by the band Europe was shot at Solnahallen on May 26 and 27, 1986. A helicopter view of the hall is included in the video. Europe's logo and the year -86 printed in big letters are visible in the shot of the roof.

On September 26, 1986, Metallica played their last concert with bassist Cliff Burton at Solnahallen, one day before Burton was killed in a bus accident.
