= EräViikingit =

Floorball club in Helsinki, Finland

- Official logo of EräViikingit
- Full name: EräViikingit
- Founded: 2016
- League: Men: F-liiga; Women: F-liiga
- Championships: Men: SSV: F-liiga (11 titles: 1993, 1995, 1996, 2001, 2004, 2005, 2007–2011); Champions Cup (2009, 2011); Viikingit: F-liiga (1997); Women: S.C. Dalmac: F-liiga (1990, 1991); Erä I: F-liiga (1992, 1993, 1995); Erä III: F-liiga (1996, 1997, 2000, 2007); European Cup (1999)

EräViikingit is a Finnish floorball club based in Helsinki. The club was founded in 2016 through the merger of the clubs Salibandyseura Viikingit (SSV) and Tapanilan Erä. The original meaning of SSV was Salibandyseura Vuosaari until 2000, when it merged with Vuosaaren Viikingit. With over 2,000 members, EräViikingit is the largest floorball club in the world.

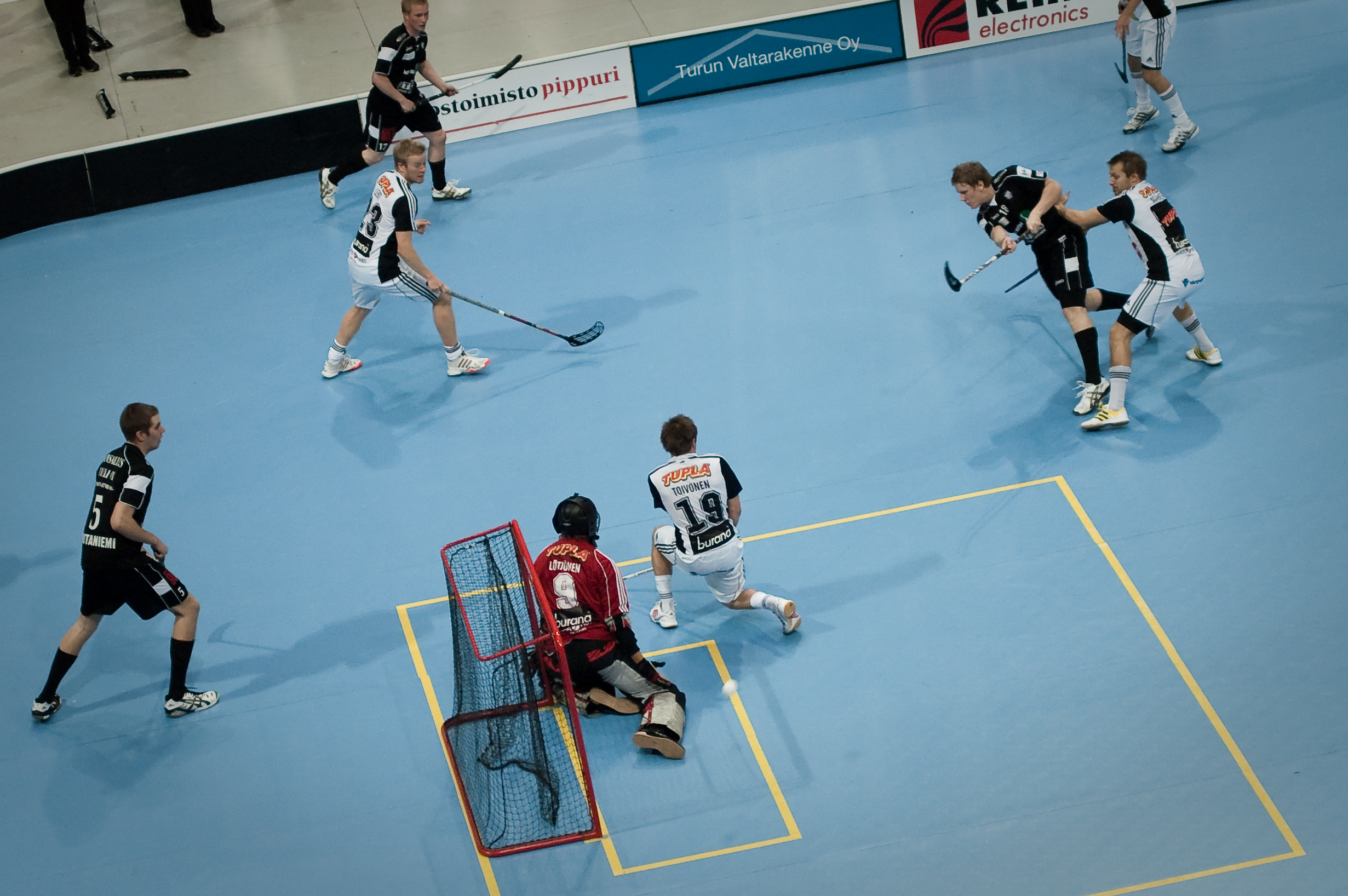
SSV players (in white) in 2009

The men's team plays in the F-liiga, the highest Finnish league. It continued the legacy of both merged clubs. The SSV club was founded in 1986 and began playing in the top league from 1988, shortly after its creation. In the 1990s, the team won the league three times, in the 1992–93, 1994–95, and 1995–96 seasons. From 1991, they competed against Vuosaaren Viikingit in the league, and the two teams met in the 1992–93 final. Viikingit won the title in the 1997–98 season, during which SSV was relegated to a lower division for one year. After returning, SSV merged with Viikingit. Together, they won eight more titles between 2001 and 2011. With a total of 11 victories, SSV is historically the most successful team in the league by a wide margin. They won the Champions Cup in 2009 and 2011, defeating Tapanilan Erä in the first instance.

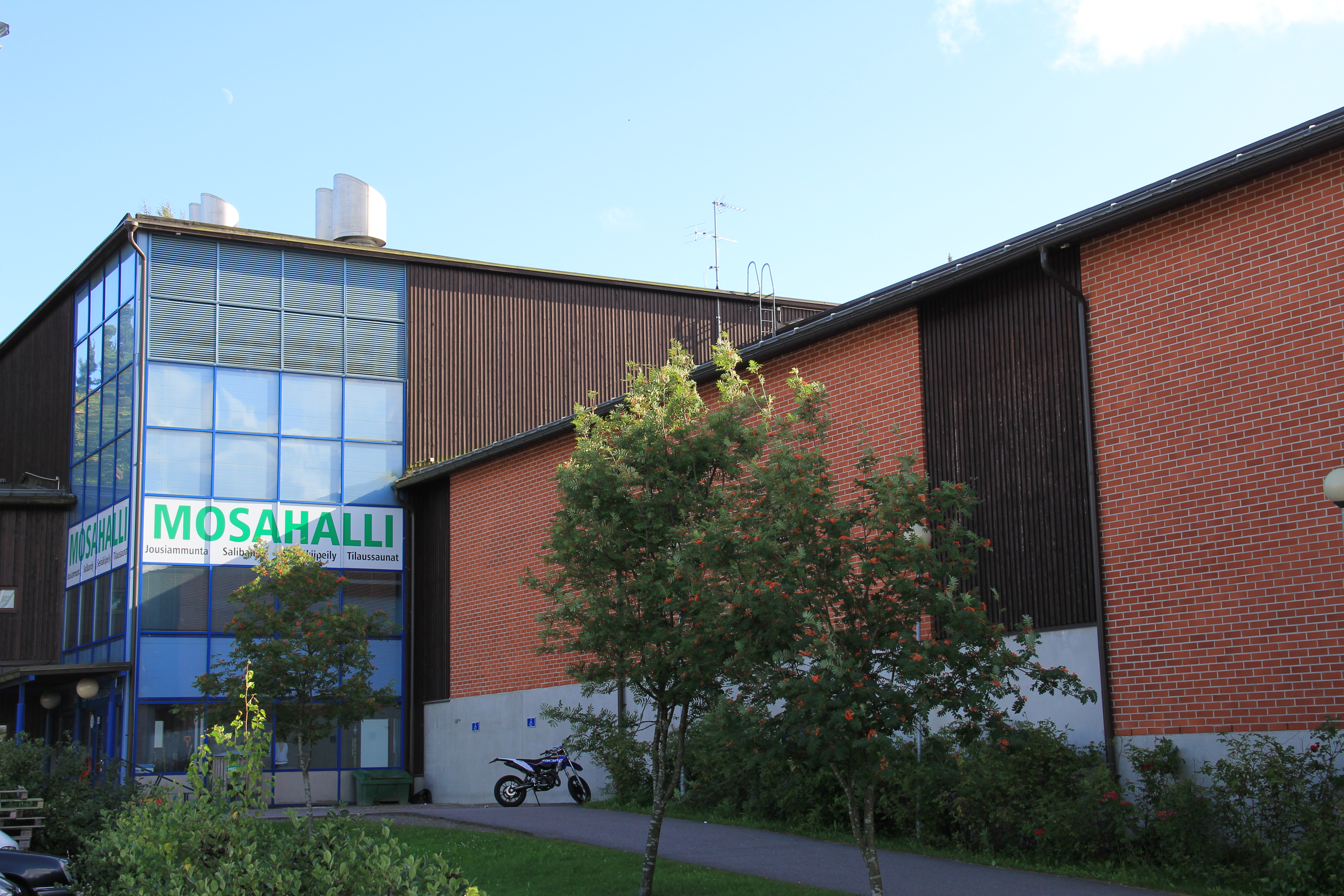
Mosahalli is the club's arena

The Tapanilan Erä club was founded in 1990 and played in the men's top league between 1993 and 1996, and then again from 2003 until the merger with SSV in 2016. Erä reached the finals twice in the 2008–09 and 2009–10 seasons, losing both times to SSV.

The women's team also plays in the F-liiga, the highest Finnish league. It continued the legacy of the Tapanilan Erä club, whose women's team had played in the top league continuously since joining the club in 1991, with the exception of one relegated season in 2009–10. Initially, the club had two teams in the league: Erä I emerged from the Synkkä Uhma team, and Erä II from the S.C. Dalmac team. In its first two seasons (1991–92 and 1992–93), Erä II defended S.C. Dalmac's previous two titles and won a third two years later. In 1991, a third team, Erä III, was established; it played in the top league starting from the 1994–95 season and won it the very next year in 1995–96. They defended the title a year later and subsequently continued in the league without the two older teams. In the 1999–00 season, Erä III won their third league title, alongside the Finnish Cup and the European Cup. Their last title dates back to 2007. The SSV women's team played in the top league between 2000 and 2006, winning silver in the 2002–03 season.

== Men's Team ==
=== Seasons ===
Season	Rank	Note
2021–22	9th	Retained spot
2022–23	11th	Won relegation play-offs against LNM
2023–24	11th	Won relegation play-offs against Tiikerit
2024–25	8th	Quarterfinal loss to Classic
2025–26	8th	Quarterfinal loss to Nokian KrP

== Women's Team ==
=== Seasons ===
Season	Rank	Note
2021–22	3rd	Won third-place match against Classic
2022–23	4th	Lost third-place match to PSS
2023–24	6th	Quarterfinal loss to Classic
2024–25	3rd	Won third-place match against SB-Pro
2025–26	4th	Lost third-place match to SB-Pro

=== Champions Cup ===
Tournament	Rank	Note
2027 Champions Cup	–	Quarterfinal loss to (Sweden) Thorengruppen IBK
