= 2026–27 Women's Floorball Champions Cup =

European floorball tournament

Women's Floorball Champions Cup
- 2026–27

Tournament information
- Sport: Floorball
- Dates: 22 August 2026–23 January 2027
- Teams: 8

Tournament statistics
- Matches played: 13

The 2026–27 Women's Floorball Champions Cup is the 32nd edition of the premier competition for floorball clubs and the fourth in a format for league and cup winners.

Quarterfinal match between Tatran Střešovice (in red) and Wizards Bern Burgdorf (in yellow) in Prague

To reduce costs for the participating teams, particularly at the request of the Swedish side, rosters were limited to 14 players starting from that edition, and playing time was shortened to three 15-minute periods, similar to the format used at the World Games. This decision was met with criticism in other countries, and some Finnish teams refused to participate.

Semifinal match between Tatran Střešovice (in red) and FBC Kalmarsund (in white) in Prague

== Format ==
The league champions and cup winners from four countries take part. If the same team wins the league and the cup in their country, the second-place team in the league also takes part.

For the quarterfinals, the eight teams are divided into two conferences based on their geographical location. The Swedish and Finnish teams take part in the Northern conference; the clubs from the Czech Republic and Switzerland play in the Southern conference. The four winners advance to the semifinals. Quarterfinals and semifinals are played in a home and away format. If a round is undecided after the two matches, the second match is followed by an overtime. The two semifinal winners play in a final held at a centralized venue.

== Teams ==
Location of teams

The women's tournament will also be attended by the Finnish Koovee, the eighth team of the Finnish league, as a replacement for the champion TPS, who withdrew from the competition due to disagreement with the format change.

Conference	Country (League)	League Winner / Replacement	Cup Winner / Runner-up
Northern	Sweden (Swedish Super League)	Thorengruppen IBK	FBC Kalmarsund (Runner-up)
Northern	Finland (F-liiga)	Koovee (Replacement)	EräViikingit
Southern	Czech Republic (Extraliga žen)	Bulldogs Brno	Tatran Střešovice
Southern	Switzerland (Unihockey Prime League)	Wizards Bern Burgdorf	Zug United

== Tournament ==
=== Bracket ===
Quarterfinals
(Czech Republic) Bulldogs Brno	2	5	1
(Switzerland) Zug United	3	3	1
(Sweden) Thorengruppen IBK	2	4	2
(Finland) EräViikingit	1	3	0
(Switzerland) Wizards Bern Burgdorf	4	2	0
(Czech Republic) Tatran Střešovice	5	2	1
(Finland) Koovee	0	0	0
(Sweden) FBC Kalmarsund	12	12	2

Semifinals
(Switzerland) Zug United	2	0	0
(Sweden) Thorengruppen IBK	5	5	2
(Czech Republic) Tatran Střešovice	0	4	1
(Sweden) FBC Kalmarsund	6	3	1

Final
(Sweden) Thorengruppen IBK
(Sweden) FBC Kalmarsund

All times are local – CET/CEST, unless stated otherwise.

=== Quarterfinals ===
22 September 2026; 20:00	Zug United (Switzerland)	3–2 (1–2, 0–0, 2–0)	(Czech Republic) Bulldogs Brno	Sporthalle Zug, Zug; Attendance: 105

Game reference

1 October 2026; 19:00	Bulldogs Brno (Czech Republic)	5–3 (2–0, 2–1, 1–2)	(Switzerland) Zug United	Sportovní hala Vodova, Brno; Attendance: 537

Game reference

1–1 in the series, Zug United won in Overtime.

22 August 2026; 18:30 EEST	EräViikingit (Finland)	1–2 (0–0, 1–1, 0–1)	(Sweden) Thorengruppen IBK	Tapanilan Mosahalli, Helsinki; Attendance: 492

Game reference

29 August 2026; 14:00	Thorengruppen IBK (Sweden)	4–3 (1–1, 2–0, 1–2)	(Finland) EräViikingit	Nolia Arena, Umeå

Game reference

Thorengruppen IBK won the series 2–0.

23 September 2026; 17:00	Tatran Střešovice (Czech Republic)	5–4 (2–3, 1–1, 2–0)	(Switzerland) Wizards Bern Burgdorf	Sportovní Centrum Řepy, Prague; Attendance: 265

Game reference

1 October 2026; 19:30	Wizards Bern Burgdorf (Switzerland)	2–2 (1–1, 0–0, 1–1)	(Czech Republic) Tatran Střešovice	UNIHOC Arena Biglen, Biglen; Attendance: 675

Game reference

Tatran Střešovice won the series 0–1.

22 August 2026; 16:00	FBC Kalmarsund (Sweden)	12–0 (6–0, 4–0, 2–0)	(Finland) Koovee	TTM-Hallen, Kalmar; Attendance: 166

Game reference

29 August 2026; 14:00 EEST	Koovee (Finland)	0–12 (0–3, 0–5, 0–4)	(Sweden) FBC Kalmarsund	Spiral-hall, Tampere; Attendance: 112

Game reference

FBC Kalmarsund won the series 0–2.

=== Semifinals ===
28 October 2026; 18:00	Thorengruppen IBK (Sweden)	5–2 (2–0, 1–1, 2–1)	(Switzerland) Zug United	Nolia Arena, Umeå; Attendance: 832

Game reference

3 November 2026; 20:00	Zug United (Switzerland)	0–5 (0–1, 0–2, 0–2)	(Sweden) Thorengruppen IBK	Sporthalle Zug, Zug; Attendance: 406

Game reference

Thorengruppen IBK won the series 0–2.

28 October 2026; 19:00	FBC Kalmarsund (Sweden)	6–0 (2–0, 1–0, 3–0)	(Czech Republic) Tatran Střešovice	TTM-Hallen, Kalmar; Attendance: 207

Game reference

4 November 2026; 16:30	Tatran Střešovice (Czech Republic)	4–3 (1–1, 0–1, 3–1)	(Sweden) FBC Kalmarsund	Sportovní Centrum Řepy, Prague; Attendance: 335

Game reference

1–1 in the series, FBC Kalmarsund won in penalty shootout.

=== Final ===
23 January 2027; 17:00	Thorengruppen IBK (Sweden)	–	(Sweden) FBC Kalmarsund	Nolia Arena, Umeå

Game reference

== EuroFloorball Cup ==
The EuroFloorball Cup was played for the winners of competitions from countries ranked lower in the IFF ranking. The tournament was held as part of the Czech Open tournament in Prague.

1st place, gold medalist(s)	(Germany) MFBC Leipzig
2nd place, silver medalist(s)	(Poland) Olimpia Osowa Gdańsk
3rd place, bronze medalist(s)	(Spain) CUF Leganés
4	(Netherlands) U.C. Face Off
5	(France) Les Dahuts du Lac

== See also ==
- 2026–27 Men's Floorball Champions Cup
