= 2024–25 Women's Floorball Champions Cup =

European floorball tournament

Women's Floorball Champions Cup
- 2024–25

Tournament information
- Sport: Floorball
- Dates: 20 August 2024–25 January 2025
- Teams: 8

Final positions
- Champions: (Sweden) Pixbo IBK (2nd title)
- Runner-up: (Sweden) Thorengruppen IBK

Tournament statistics
- Matches played: 13

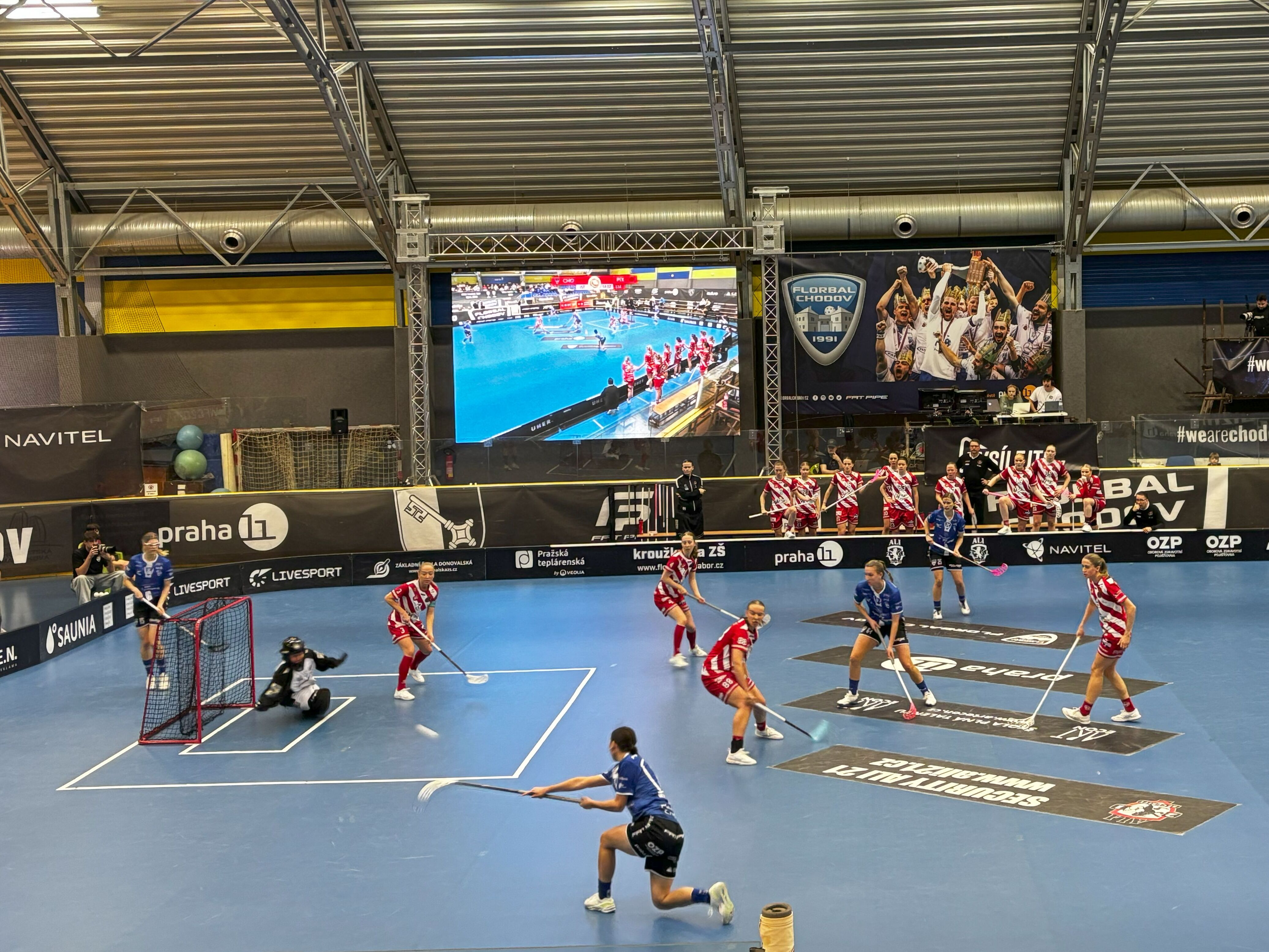
Semifinal match between Florbal Chodov and Pixbo IBK in Prague

The 2024–25 Women's Floorball Champions Cup was the 30th edition of the premier competition for floorball clubs and the second in a format for league and cup winners.

Pixbo IBK won its second title by defeating two-time reigning champions Thorengruppen IBK. Pixbo won also in the men's tournament, becoming the first club to win both titles in the same year.

== Format ==
The league champions and cup winners from four countries take part. If the same team wins the league and the cup in their country, the second-place team in the league also takes part.

For quarterfinals the eight teams are divided into two conferences based on their geographical location. The Swedish and Finnish teams take part in the Northern conference; the clubs from the Czech Republic and Switzerland play in the Southern conference. The four winners advance to the semifinals. Quarterfinals and semifinals are played in a home and away format. If a round is undecided after the two matches, the second match is followed by an overtime. The two semifinal winners play in a final held at a centralized venue.

== Teams ==
Location of teams of the 2024–25 Floorball Champions Cup.

Conference	Country (League)	League Winner	Cup Winner/Runner-up
Northern	Sweden (Swedish Super League)	Thorengruppen IBK (1st, Cup)	Pixbo IBK (2nd in Cup)
Northern	Finland (F-liiga)	TPS (1st, Cup)	Classic (2nd)
Southern	Czech Republic (Extraliga žen)	1. SC Vítkovice (1st)	Florbal Chodov (2nd)
Southern	Switzerland (Unihockey Prime League)	Kloten-Dietlikon Jets (1st, Cup)	Zug United (2nd)

== Tournament ==
=== Bracket ===
Quarterfinals
(Sweden) Thorengruppen IBK	9	9	2
(Finland) Classic	1	2	0
(Czech Republic) 1. SC Vítkovice	5	6	2
(Switzerland) Zug United	4	4	0
(Switzerland) Kloten-Dietlikon Jets	5	1	0
(Czech Republic) Florbal Chodov	8	2	2
(Finland) TPS	5	3	0
(Sweden) Pixbo IBK	8	9	2

Semifinals
(Sweden) Thorengruppen IBK	12	6	2
(Czech Republic) 1. SC Vítkovice	2	4	0
(Czech Republic) Florbal Chodov	4	3	0
(Sweden) Pixbo IBK	13	8	2

Final
(Sweden) Thorengruppen IBK	0
(Sweden) Pixbo IBK	3

All times are local – CET/CEST, unless stated otherwise.

=== Quarterfinals ===
25 August 2024; 13:00 EEST	Classic (Finland)	1–9 (0–4, 1–3, 0–2)	(Sweden) Thorengruppen IBK	Ideapark Blak Boks, Lempäälä; Attendance: 501

Game reference

31 August 2024; 13:30	Thorengruppen IBK (Sweden)	9–2 (2–1, 4–0, 3–1)	(Finland) Classic	Thoren Arena, Umeå; Attendance: 287

Game reference

Thorengruppen IBK won the series 2–0.

22 September 2024; 15:00	Zug United (Switzerland)	4–5 (2–1, 1–1, 1–3)	(Czech Republic) 1. SC TEMPISH Vítkovice	Sporthalle Zug, Zug; Attendance: 137

Game reference

29 September 2024; 15:00	1. SC TEMPISH Vítkovice (Czech Republic)	6–4 (1–2, 2–1, 3–1)	(Switzerland) Zug United	SH Sareza, Ostrava; Attendance: 315

Game reference

1. SC TEMPISH Vítkovice won the series 2–0.

20 September 2024; 18:30	Florbal Chodov (Czech Republic)	8–5 (4–2, 1–2, 3–1)	(Switzerland) Kloten-Dietlikon Jets	SH Jižní Město, Prague; Attendance: 370

Game reference

27 September 2024; 19:30	Kloten-Dietlikon Jets (Switzerland)	1–2 (0–0, 1–1, 0–1)	(Czech Republic) Florbal Chodov	Sporthalle Stighag, Kloten; Attendance: 243

Game reference

Florbal Chodov won the series 0–2.

25 August 2024; 18:30	Pixbo IBK (Sweden)	8–5 (4–2, 2–2, 2–1)	(Finland) TPS	Wallenstam Arena, Gothenburg; Attendance: 182

Game reference

31 August 2024; 16:00 EEST	TPS (Finland)	3–9 (2–2, 1–3, 0–4)	(Sweden) Pixbo IBK	Kupittaan Palloiluhalli, Turku; Attendance: 178

Game reference

Pixbo IBK won the series 0–2.

=== Semifinals ===
23 November 2024; 13:30	1. SC TEMPISH Vítkovice (Czech Republic)	2–12 (1–4, 0–3, 1–5)	(Sweden) Thorengruppen IBK	SH Sareza, Ostrava; Attendance: 282

Game reference

24 November 2024; 17:00	Thorengruppen IBK (Sweden)	6–4 (2–2, 3–1, 1–1)	(Czech Republic) 1. SC TEMPISH Vítkovice	SH Sareza, Ostrava; Attendance: 224

Game reference

Thorengruppen IBK won the series 0–2.

23 November 2024; 12:30	Pixbo IBK (Sweden)	13–4 (7–2, 4–2, 2–0)	(Czech Republic) Florbal Chodov	Wallenstam Arena, Gothenburg; Attendance: 193

Game reference

1 December 2024; 13:00	Florbal Chodov (Czech Republic)	3–8 (1–2, 0–2, 2–4)	(Sweden) Pixbo IBK	SH Jižní Město, Prague; Attendance: 312

Game reference

Pixbo IBK won the series 2–0.

=== Final ===
25 January 2025; 13:30	Thorengruppen IBK (Sweden)	0–3 (0:1, 0:0, 0:2)	(Sweden) Pixbo IBK	Thoren Arena, Umeå; Attendance: 2,100

Game reference

2024–25 Women's Floorball Champions Cup Champions

Pixbo IBK
Second title

== See also ==
- 2024–25 Men's Floorball Champions Cup
