= 2026–27 Men's Floorball Champions Cup =

European floorball tournament

Men's Floorball Champions Cup
- 2026–27

Tournament information
- Sport: Floorball
- Dates: 21 August 2026–23 January 2027
- Teams: 8

Tournament statistics
- Matches played: 13

The 2026–27 Men's Floorball Champions Cup is the 32nd edition of the premier competition for floorball clubs and the fourth in a format for league and cup winners.

Quarterfinal match between Tatran Střešovice (in red) and HC Rychenberg Winterthur (in yellow) in Prague

To reduce costs for the participating teams, particularly at the request of the Swedish side, rosters were limited to 14 players starting from that edition, and playing time was shortened to three 15-minute periods, similar to the format used at the World Games. This decision was met with criticism in other countries and even Swedish players.

Semifinal match between Tatran Střešovice (in red) and Storvreta IBK (in black) in Prague

== Format ==
The league champions and cup winners from four countries take part. If the same team wins the league and the cup in their country, the second-place team in the league also takes part.

For the quarterfinals the eight teams are divided into two conferences based on their geographical location. The Swedish and Finnish teams take part in the Northern conference; the clubs from the Czech Republic and Switzerland play in the Southern conference. The four winners advance to the semifinals. Quarterfinals and semifinals are played in a home and away format. If a round is undecided after the two matches, the second match is followed by an overtime. The two semifinal winners play in a final held at a centralized venue.

== Teams ==
Location of teams

| Conference | Country (League) | League Winner | Cup Winner / Runner-up |
|---|---|---|---|
| Northern | Sweden (Swedish Super League) | Storvreta IBK | IBF Falun (Runner-up) |
| Northern | Finland (F-liiga) | Nokian KrP | SPV |
| Southern | Czech Republic (Livesport Superliga) | Florbal MB | Tatran Střešovice (Runner-up) |
| Southern | Switzerland (Unihockey Prime League) | HC Rychenberg Winterthur | Floorball Thurgau |

== Tournament ==
=== Bracket ===
Quarterfinals
(Czech Republic) Florbal MB | 4 | 4 | 1
(Switzerland) Floorball Thurgau | 6 | 1 | 1
(Finland) Nokian KrP | 5 | 2 | 1
(Sweden) IBF Falun | 4 | 2 | 0
(Switzerland) HC Rychenberg Winterthur | 4 | 3 | 0
(Czech Republic) Tatran Střešovice | 5 | 3 | 1
(Sweden) Storvreta IBK | 2 | 3 | 1
(Finland) SPV | 1 | 3 | 0

Semifinals
(Switzerland) Floorball Thurgau | 3 | 4 | 0
(Finland) Nokian KrP | 4 | 7 | 2
(Czech Republic) Tatran Střešovice | 2 | 3 | 0
(Sweden) Storvreta IBK | 4 | 3 | 1

Final
(Finland) Nokian KrP
(Sweden) Storvreta IBK

All times are local – CET/CEST, unless stated otherwise.

=== Quarterfinals ===
| 23 September 2026; 19:30 | Floorball Thurgau (Switzerland) | 6–4 (2–1, 0–2, 4–1) | (Czech Republic) Florbal MB | Sporthalle Tellenfeld, Amriswil; Attendance: 734 |

Game reference

| 1 October 2026; 18:30 | Florbal MB (Czech Republic) | 4–1 (1–1, 2–0, 1–0) | (Switzerland) Floorball Thurgau | Amix Arena, Mladá Boleslav; Attendance: 526 |

Game reference

1–1 in the series, Floorball Thurgau won in Overtime.

| 23 August 2026; 16:00 | IBF Falun (Sweden) | 4–5 (0–2, 0–2, 4–1) | (Finland) Nokian KrP | UW-Tech Arena, Falun; Attendance: 1,763 |

Game reference

| 29 August 2026; 17:00 EEST | Nokian KrP (Finland) | 2–2 (0–0, 1–1, 1–1) | (Sweden) IBF Falun | AGCO Power Arena, Nokia; Attendance: 457 |

Game reference

Nokian KrP won the series 1–0.

| 23 September 2026; 20:00 | Tatran Střešovice (Czech Republic) | 5–4 (2–2, 1–0, 2–2) | (Switzerland) HC Rychenberg Winterthur | Sportovní Centrum Řepy, Prague; Attendance: 415 |

Game reference

| 30 September 2026; 19:00 | HC Rychenberg Winterthur (Switzerland) | 3–3 (1–1, 0–2, 2–0) | (Czech Republic) Tatran Střešovice | AXA Arena, Winterthur; Attendance: 1,243 |

Game reference

Tatran Střešovice won the series 0–1.

| 22 August 2026; 18:00 EEST | SPV (Finland) | 1–2 (0–1, 1–0, 0–1) | (Sweden) Storvreta IBK | Seinäjoen Urheilutalo, Seinäjoki; Attendance: 912 |

Game reference

| 30 August 2026; 14:00 | Storvreta IBK (Sweden) | 3–3 (0–1, 1–1, 2–1) | (Finland) SPV | IFU Arena, Uppsala; Attendance: 668 |

Game reference

Storvreta IBK won the series 1–0.

=== Semifinals ===
| 27 October 2026; 18:30 EET | Nokian KrP (Finland) | 4–3 (3–3, 1–0, 0–0) | (Switzerland) Floorball Thurgau | AGCO Power Arena, Nokia; Attendance: 489 |

Game reference

| 4 November 2026; 19:30 | Floorball Thurgau (Switzerland) | 4–7 (2–0, 1–2, 1–5) | (Finland) Nokian KrP | Sporthalle Tellenfeld, Amriswil; Attendance: 1,113 |

Game reference

Nokian KrP won the series 0–2.

| 27 October 2026; 18:30 | Storvreta IBK (Sweden) | 4–2 (1–1, 2–1, 1–0) | (Czech Republic) Tatran Střešovice | IFU Arena, Uppsala; Attendance: 1,314 |

Game reference

| 4 November 2026; 19:30 | Tatran Střešovice (Czech Republic) | 3–3 (1–1, 1–1, 1–1) | (Sweden) Storvreta IBK | Sportovní Centrum Řepy, Prague; Attendance: 836 |

Game reference

Storvreta IBK won the series 0–1.

=== Final ===
| 23 January 2027; 15:00 EET | Nokian KrP (Finland) | – | (Sweden) Storvreta IBK | AGCO Power Arena, Nokia |

Game reference

== EuroFloorball Cup and Challenge ==
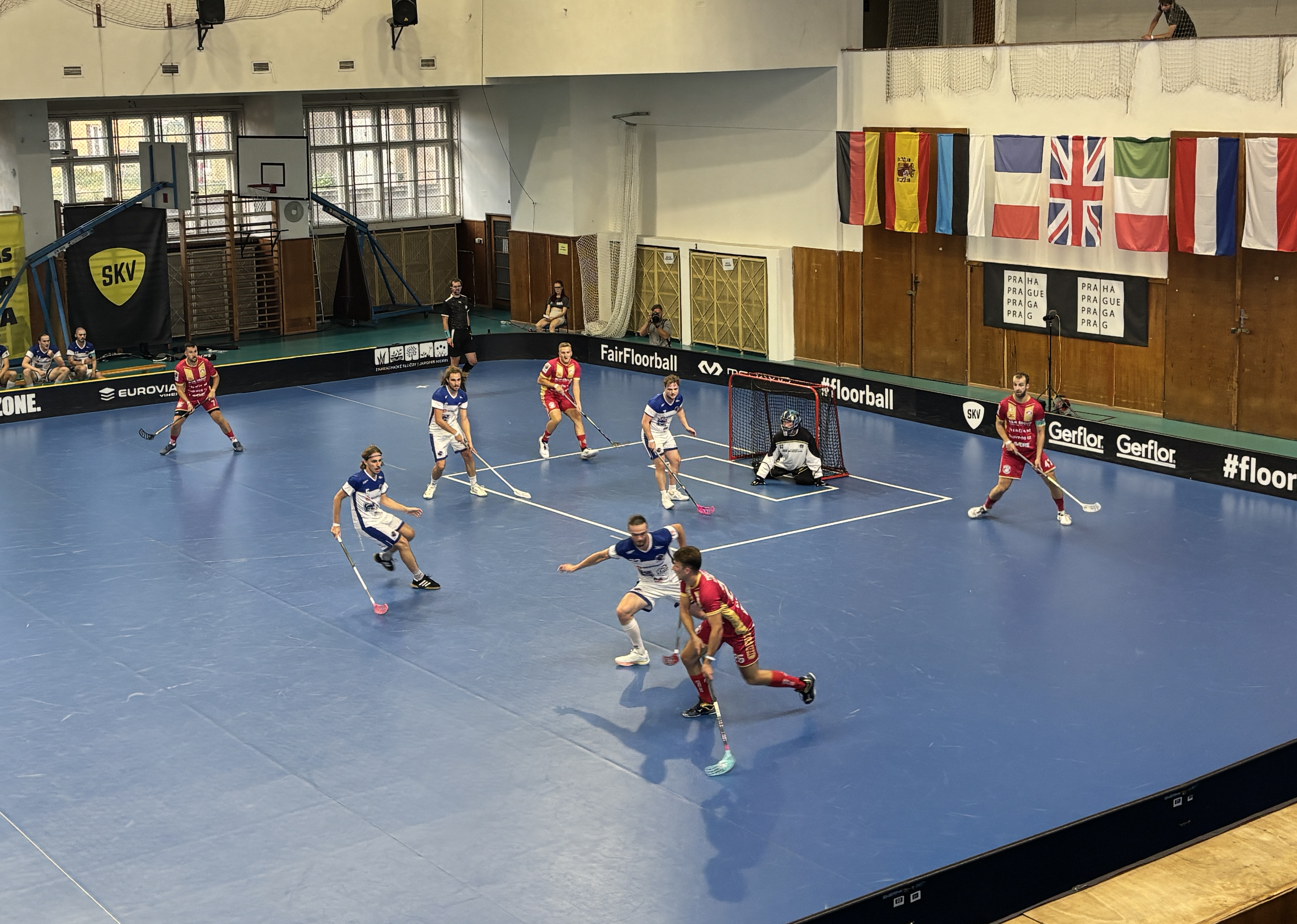
1. FBC Trenčín vs. Besançon FC match

The EuroFloorball Cup 2026 for the winners of competitions from countries ranked lower in the IFF ranking was held as part of the Czech Open tournament in Prague.

| 1st place, gold medalist(s) | (Slovakia) 1. FBC Trenčín |
| 2nd place, silver medalist(s) | (Poland) UKS Bankówka Zielonka |
| 3rd place, bronze medalist(s) | (Estonia) Jogeva SK Tahe |
| 4 | (France) Besançon FC |

EuroFloorball Challenge for further teams was reinstated.

| 1st place, gold medalist(s) | (Spain) CD El Valle |
| 2nd place, silver medalist(s) | (Netherlands) FB Agents |
| 3rd place, bronze medalist(s) | (Italy) FC Dragons Milano |
| 4 | (United Kingdom) London Sharks FC |

== See also ==
- 2026–27 Women's Floorball Champions Cup
