= TPS Turku =

TPS Turku may refer to:

- HC TPS, ice hockey team
- Turun Palloseura, football team
- Turun Palloseura (floorball), floorball team
- Turun Palloseura (women's football), women's football team
