= Champions Cup (floorball) =

Football tournament

IFF Champions Cup
- Sport: Floorball
- Founded: 1993; 33 years ago
- No. of teams: 8 men's and 8 women's
- Countries: Czech Republic; Finland; Sweden; Switzerland
- Confederation: IFF
- Most recent champions: M: (Sweden) Storvreta IBK (5th title); W: (Sweden) Thorengruppen IBK (3rd title) (2026)
- Most titles: M: Sweden (25); W: Sweden (26)
- Related competitions: EuroFloorball Cup; EuroFloorball Challenge; Men: (Sweden) Swedish Super League (Czech Republic) Superliga florbalu (Finland) F-liiga (Switzerland) Unihockey Prime League; Women: (Sweden) Swedish Super League (Finland) F-liiga (Czech Republic) Extraliga žen (Switzerland) Unihockey Prime League
- Website: floorballchampionscup.sport

The Champions Cup (EuroFloorball Cup 1993–2010) is floorball tournament organized by the International Floorball Federation for the best clubs from the top four countries according to IFF World Ranking. Since 2019, those are Sweden, the Czech Republic, Finland and Switzerland, both for men and women. The tournament culminates every year in January both for men's and women's teams, that won in the previous season in their national league and cup competitions. That means, there are eight men's and eight women's teams in the tournament in total.

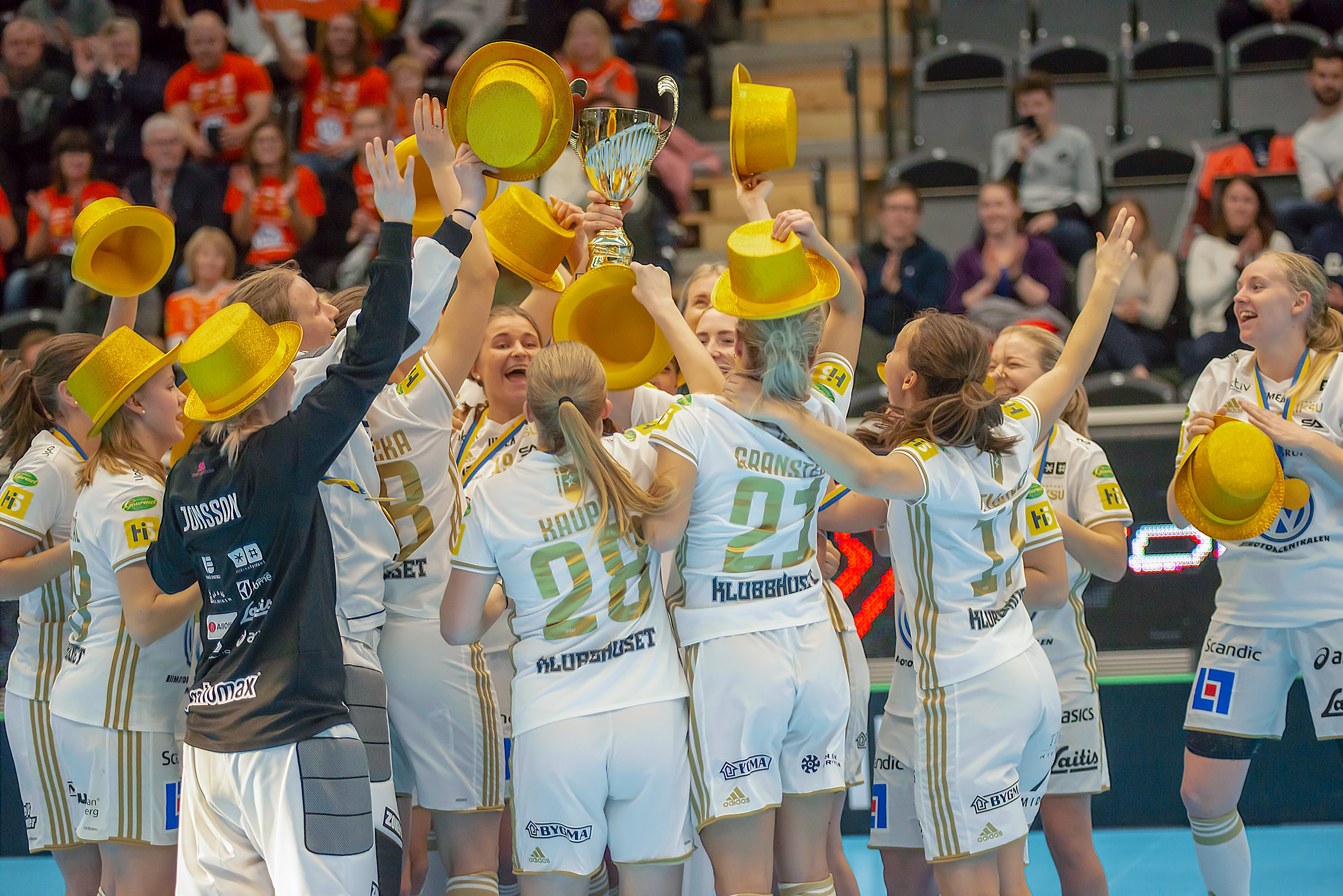
Record seven-time winner IKSU, celebrating their last 2019 Champions Cup.

In various formats, the tournament took place 31 times, the last time in 2025–26. The first tournament was played in 1993. The new format with eight teams is used since 2024. Swedes won most titles, 25 in men's and 26 in women's tournaments (including the last 16 consecutively). Among the teams, Sweden's IBF Falun and Storvreta IBK are the most successful with five wins in the men's category and the defunct IKSU with seven in the women's. In 2025, the men and women of the same club, Pixbo IBK, won for the first time.

There are other tournaments organized for clubs from European countries at lower ranks: EuroFloorball Cup for countries at the fifth through tenth rank, and EuroFloorball Challenge for the rest.

== Format ==
The Champions Cup is an elimination tournament. It starts with the beginning of floorball season in late summer/early autumn. Eight teams play both in men's and women's competitions – two teams from each of the top four countries according to the IFF World Ranking. The top-ranked countries are Sweden, the Czech Republic, Finland and Switzerland, both for men and women. The top seeded teams in the Champions Cup are the winners of national leagues. For the men's tournament, these are winners of the Swedish Super League, Superliga florbalu, F-liiga and Unihockey Prime League. For the women's tournament, these are the Swedish Super League, F-liiga, Extraliga žen and Unihockey Prime League. Second-seeded teams come from national cup competitions. If the same team wins both league and cup, either a runner-up for the cup (Sweden) or the league (all other countries) takes part.

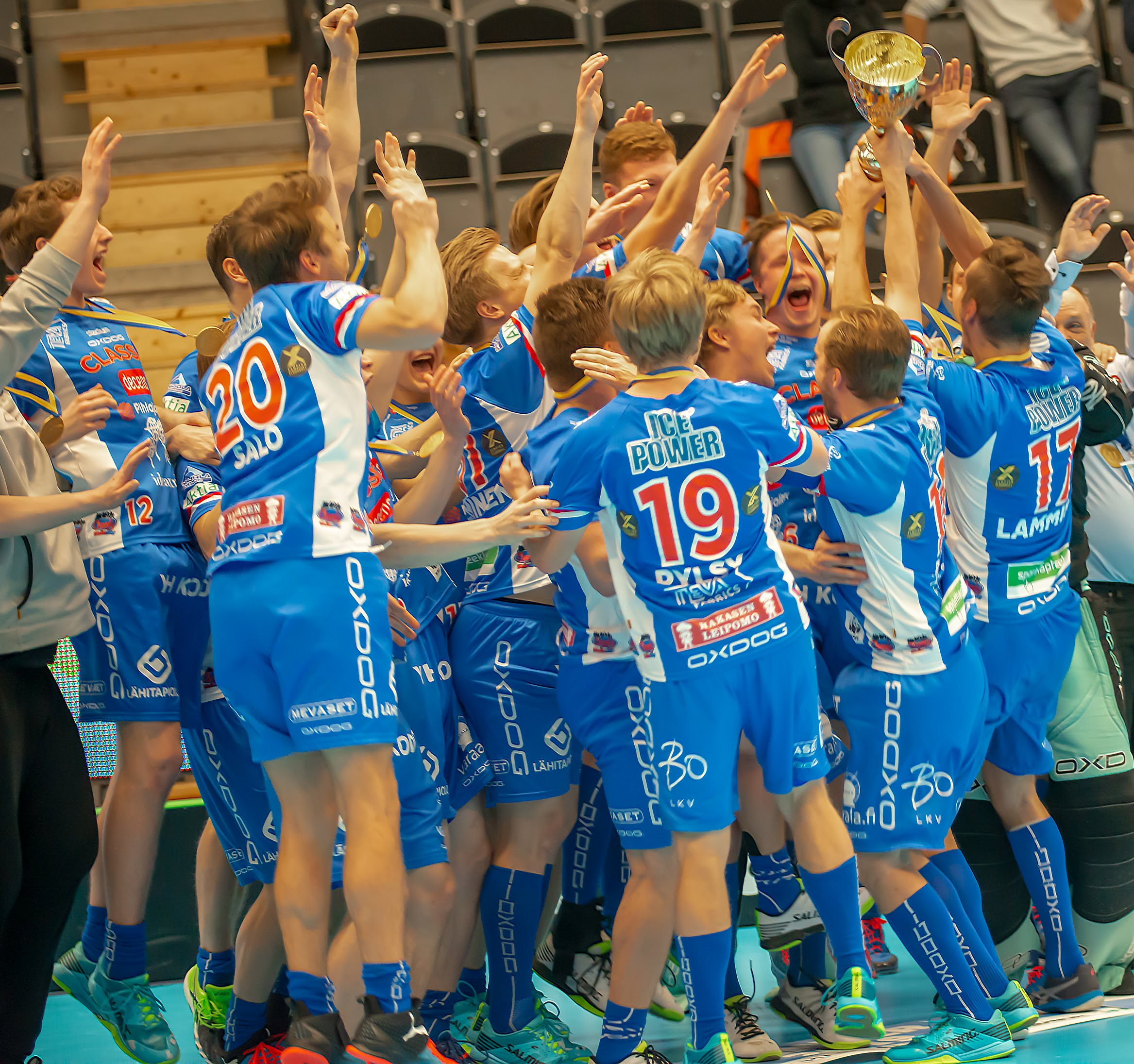
Men's team Classic, winner of the 2019 tournament

For quarterfinals, the four teams are divided into Northern (Sweden and Finland) and Southern (the Czech republic and Switzerland) conferences. Each of the two teams in a conference hosts one match, starting with a cup winner (or a runner-up). If a winner of the fixture is not decided after the two matches, the second match (hosted by a league winner) is followed by an overtime and, if necessary, a penalty shoot-out. Matchups for the semifinals are decided by a random drawing. The semifinals have the same format as the quarterfinals. Only one match is played in the final, which takes place in January.

== History of the tournament ==
The first international club tournament was European Cup. It took place the first time in 1993. In 2008, the tournament was renamed to EuroFloorball Cup due to a naming conflict.

In 2011, the tournament was split to the Champions Cup for six teams and the EuroFloorball Cup for the rest. The Champions Cup was played by teams from the top five ranked countries. The hosting country had two teams in the tournament. In all tournaments played in this format, teams from the Czech Republic, Finland, Sweden and Switzerland competed. The sixth participant in men's tournament varied throughout the years from Germany, Latvia and Norway. In women's tournament, they were from Latvia, Norway and Russia.

The tournament was further split in 2019 to the Champions Cup for clubs from the top four countries, and EuroFloorball Cup and EuroFloorball Challenge for rest. At the same time, a tournament term was changed from October to January of the next year. For this reason, there was no tournament in 2018. The competing countries alternated in hosting the tournament. The event lasted two days.

Since 2024, the format was changed to include national cup winners too. In quarterfinals, Czech and Swiss teams (southern conference) and Swedish and Finnish teams (northern conference) face each other. For semifinals, opponents are drawn. Both these stages are played in two legged format. In finals, only one game is played. The tournament in this format was approved for three years, and its future beyond that remains uncertain.

== Men's tournament ==
=== Results ===
Tournament	Champion	Runner-up	Score	Location	Website
2027 Champions Cup	(Finland) (Sweden)	(Finland) (Sweden)	:		
2026 Champions Cup	(Sweden) Storvreta IBK	(Sweden) IBF Falun	4:3 PS	(Sweden) Falun	Website
2025 Champions Cup	(Sweden) Pixbo IBK	(Czech Republic) Florbal MB	9:6	(Czech Republic) Mladá Boleslav	Website
2024 Champions Cup	(Czech Republic) Tatran Střešovice	(Sweden) IBF Falun	6:4	(Czech Republic) Prague	Website
2023 Champions Cup	(Sweden) IBF Falun	(Finland) SC Classic	2:1	(Finland) Lempäälä	Website
2022 Champions Cup	Cancelled due to COVID-19 pandemic			(Switzerland) Winterthur	
2021 Champions Cup	Cancelled due to COVID-19 pandemic			(Switzerland) Winterthur	
2020 Champions Cup	(Sweden) Storvreta IBK	(Switzerland) SV Wiler-Ersigen	10:4	(Czech Republic) Ostrava	Website
2019 Champions Cup	(Finland) Classic	(Sweden) Storvreta IBK	10:3	(Sweden) Gävle	Website
2017 Champions Cup	(Sweden) IBF Falun	(Finland) Classic	7:4	(Finland) Seinäjoki	Website
2016 Champions Cup	(Sweden) Storvreta IBK	(Finland) Classic	2:1	(Sweden) Borås	Website
2015 Champions Cup	(Sweden) IBF Falun	(Switzerland) SV Wiler-Ersigen	3:2	(Czech Republic) Mladá Boleslav	Website
2014 Champions Cup	(Sweden) IBF Falun	(Finland) Happee Jyväskylä	12:0	(Switzerland) Zurich	Website
2013 Champions Cup	(Sweden) IBF Falun	(Finland) SPV	7:5	(Finland) Tampere	Website
2012 Champions Cup	(Sweden) Storvreta IBK	(Sweden) IBK Dalen	6:3	(Sweden) Umeå	Website
2011 Champions Cup	(Finland) SSV Helsinki	(Czech Republic) Tatran Střešovice	4:3	(Czech Republic) Mladá Boleslav	Website
2010 EuroFloorball Cup	(Sweden) Storvreta IBK	(Czech Republic) 1. SC Vítkovice	6:3	(Latvia) Valmiera & Kocēni	Website
2009 EuroFloorball Cup	(Finland) SSV Helsinki	(Finland) Tapanilan Erä	6:5 OT	(Norway) Frederikshavn	Website
2008 EuroFloorball Cup	(Sweden) AIK IBF	(Switzerland) SV Wiler-Ersigen	5:2	(Switzerland) Winterthur	Website
2007–08 EuroFloorball Cup	(Sweden) AIK IBF	(Sweden) Warberg IC	2:1 OT	(Finland) Vantaa	Website
2006–07 European Cup	(Sweden) AIK IBF	(Sweden) Warberg IC	6:5	(Sweden) Varberg	Website
2005–06 European Cup	(Sweden) Warberg IC	(Finland) SSV Helsinki	7:6 PS	(Czech Republic) Ostrava	Website
2004–05 European Cup	(Switzerland) SV Wiler-Ersigen	(Sweden) Pixbo IBK	9:1	(Switzerland) Zurich	Website
2003–04 European Cup	(Sweden) Pixbo IBK	(Finland) Espoon Oilers	10:7	(Germany) Weissenfels	Website
2002–03 European Cup	(Sweden) Haninge IBK	(Sweden) Pixbo IBK	3:2 PS	(Czech Republic) Prague	Website
2001–02 European Cup	(Sweden) Haninge IBK	(Finland) SSV Helsinki	7:3	(Sweden) Botkyrka	Website
2000–01 European Cup	(Finland) Helsingfors IFK	(Sweden) Haninge IBK	2:0	(Sweden) Gothenburg	Website
1999 European Cup	(Sweden) Warberg IC	(Sweden) Haninge IBK	7:5	(Switzerland) Bern	Website
1998 European Cup	(Sweden) Warberg IC	(Finland) SSV Helsinki	5:4 OT	(Finland) Helsinki	Website
1997 European Cup	(Sweden) Fornudden IB	(Sweden) Balrog IK	5:0	(Sweden) Stockholm	Website
1996 European Cup	(Sweden) Balrog IK	(Sweden) Kista IBK	5:2	(Sweden) Stockholm	Website
1995 European Cup	(Sweden) Kista IBK	(Sweden) Balrog IK	5:2	(Sweden) Karlstad	Website
1994 European Cup	(Sweden) Balrog IK	(Sweden) Fornudden IB	6:3	(Switzerland) Chur	Website
1993 European Cup	(Sweden) Balrog IK	(Finland) SSV Helsinki	9:2	(Sweden) Stockholm	Website

=== Ranking ===
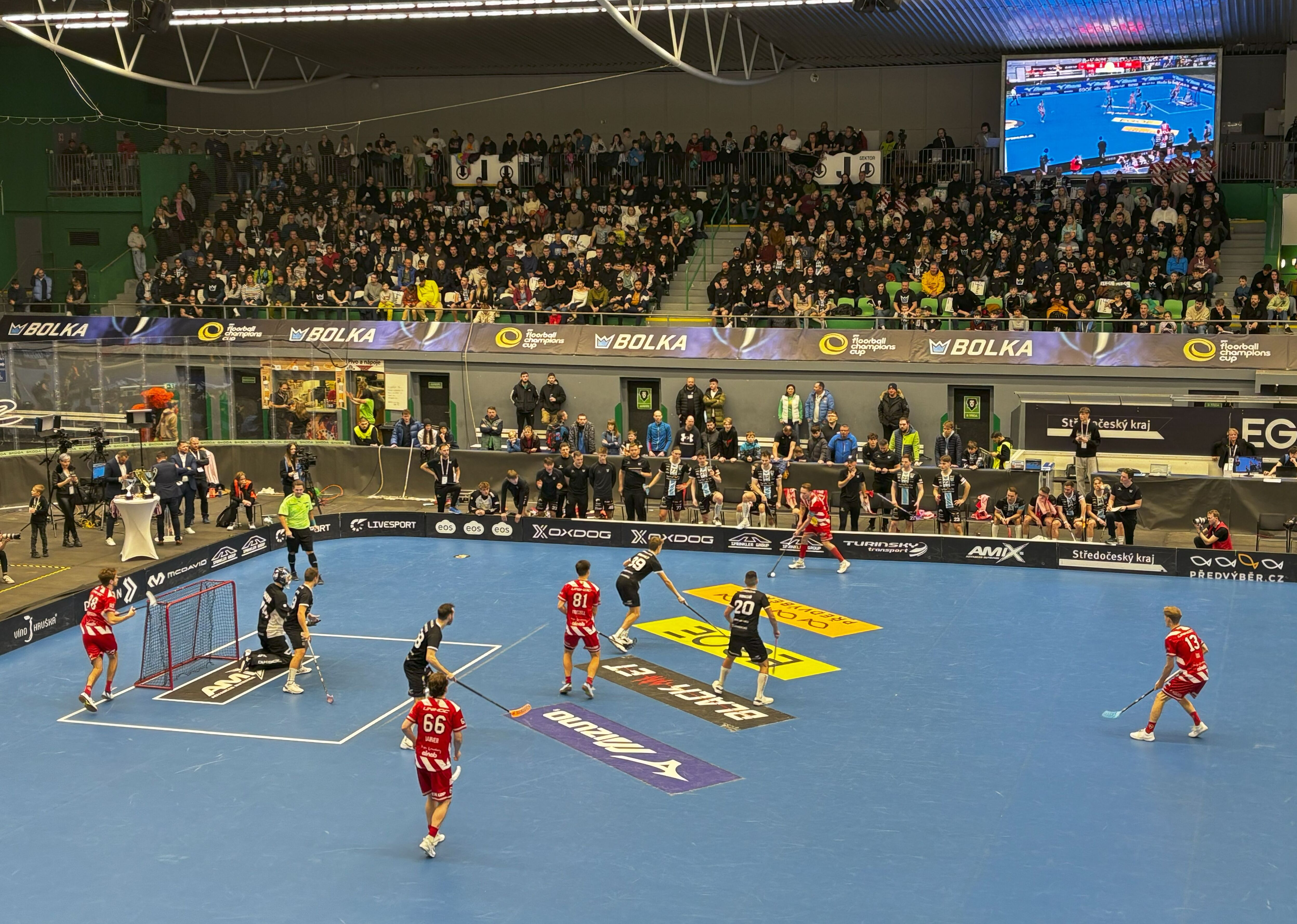
The final match between Florbal MB (in black) and Pixbo IBK in 2025.

Rank	Nation	Gold	Silver	Bronze	Total
1	Sweden (SWE)	25	14	0	39
2	Finland (FIN)	4	11	0	15
3	Czech Republic (CZE)	1	3	0	4
3	Switzerland (SUI)	1	3	0	4
Totals (4 entries)		31	31	0	62

== Women's tournament ==
=== Results ===
Tournament	Champion	Runner-up	Score	Location	Website
2026 Champions Cup	(Sweden) Thorengruppen IBK	(Czech Republic) 1. SC Vítkovice	9:2	(Czech Republic) Ostrava	Website
2025 Champions Cup	(Sweden) Pixbo IBK	(Sweden) Thorengruppen IBK	3:0	(Sweden) Umeå	Website
2024 Champions Cup	(Sweden) Thorengruppen IBK	(Sweden) Pixbo IBK	4:3	(Sweden) Mölnlycke	Website
2023 Champions Cup	(Sweden) Team Thorengruppen	(Finland) TPS	5:2	(Finland) Lempäälä	Website
2022 Champions Cup	Cancelled due to COVID-19 pandemic			(Switzerland) Winterthur	
2021 Champions Cup	Cancelled due to COVID-19 pandemic			(Switzerland) Winterthur	
2020 Champions Cup	(Sweden) Täby FC	(Finland) SB-Pro	10:3	(Czech Republic) Ostrava	Website
2019 Champions Cup	(Sweden) IKSU	(Czech Republic) 1. SC Vítkovice	8:3	(Sweden) Gävle	Website
2017 Champions Cup	(Sweden) IKSU	(Finland) Classic	5:1	(Finland) Seinäjoki	Website
2016 Champions Cup	(Sweden) Pixbo	(Finland) Classic	6:2	(Sweden) Borås	Website
2015 Champions Cup	(Sweden) KAIS Mora IF	(Finland) Classic	13:6	(Czech Republic) Mladá Boleslav	Website
2014 Champions Cup	(Sweden) Djurgårdens IF IBF	(Czech Republic) 1. SC Vítkovice	10:4	(Switzerland) Zurich	Website
2013 Champions Cup	(Sweden) Rönnby IBK	(Finland) SB-Pro	4:3	(Finland) Tampere	Website
2012 Champions Cup	(Sweden) IKSU	(Finland) SC Classic	10:5	(Sweden) Umeå	Website
2011 Champions Cup	(Sweden) IF Djurgårdens IBF	(Finland) SC Classic	9:5	(Czech Republic) Mladá Boleslav	Website
2010 EuroFloorball Cup	(Sweden) IKSU innebandy	(Switzerland) Piranha Chur	5:4	(Latvia) Valmiera, Kocēni	Website
2009 EuroFloorball Cup	(Sweden) IKSU innebandy	(Switzerland) UHC Dietlikon	9:5	(Norway) Frederikshavn	Website
2008 EuroFloorball Cup	(Sweden) IKSU innebandy	(Sweden) Balrog IK	3:2 OT	(Switzerland) Winterthur	Website
2007–08 EuroFloorball Cup	(Switzerland) UHC Dietlikon	(Sweden) IKSU innebandy	3:2 PS	(Finland) Vantaa	Website
2006–07 European Cup	(Switzerland) UHC Dietlikon	(Sweden) IKSU innebandy	4:3	(Sweden) Varberg	Website
2005–06 European Cup	(Sweden) IKSU innebandy	(Finland) Tikkurilan Tiikerit	7:4	(Czech Republic) Ostrava	Website
2004–05 European Cup	(Switzerland) RA Rychenberg	(Finland) Tikkurilan Tiikerit	3:2	(Switzerland) Zurich	Website
2003–04 European Cup	(Finland) SC Classic	(Sweden) Södertälje IBK	6:3	(Germany) Weissenfels	Website
2002–03 European Cup	(Sweden) Balrog IK	(Switzerland) RA Rychenberg	3:2	(Czech Republic) Prague	Website
2001–02 European Cup	(Sweden) Balrog IK	(Switzerland) RA Rychenberg	8:4	(Sweden) Botkyrka	Website
2000–01 European Cup	(Sweden) Balrog IK	(Switzerland) RA Rychenberg	5:4 PS	(Sweden) Gothenburg	Website
1999 European Cup	(Finland) Tapanilan Erä	(Switzerland) RA Rychenberg	5:1	(Switzerland) Bern	Website
1998 European Cup	(Sweden) Högdalens AIS	(Finland) Vantaa FT	1:0	(Finland) Helsinki	Website
1997 European Cup	(Sweden) Högdalens AIS	(Switzerland) RA Rychenberg	4:2	(Sweden) Stockholm	Website
1996 European Cup	(Sweden) Högdalens AIS	(Sweden) Sjöstad IF	5:0	(Sweden) Stockholm	Website
1995 European Cup	(Sweden) Sjöstad IF	(Sweden) IBK Lockerud	5:1	(Sweden) Karlstad	Website
1994 European Cup	(Sweden) Sjöstad IF	(Sweden) VK Rakset	3:2	(Switzerland) Chur	Website
1993 European Cup	(Sweden) VK Rasket	(Switzerland) RA Rychenberg	8:3	(Finland) Helsinki	Website

=== Ranking ===
Rank	Nation	Gold	Silver	Bronze	Total
1	Sweden (SWE)	26	9	0	35
2	Switzerland (SUI)	3	8	0	11
3	Finland (FIN)	2	11	0	13
4	Czech Republic (CZE)	0	3	0	3
Totals (4 entries)		31	31	0	62

== See also ==
- IFF World Ranking
- International Floorball Federation
