= Rasmus Österman =

Finnish floorball goalie

Personal information
- Nationality: Finnish
- Born: May 7, 1991 (age 34) Nakkila, Finland

Sport
- Position: Goalkeeper
- Team: NTK Nakkila
- Updated on 29.8.2021

Rasmus Österman is a professional floorball goalie who currently plays for NTK Nakkila in III-divisioona. Österman has also played in the Salibandyliiga (now F-liiga) (top tier Finnish floorball league) for FBT Karhut.

== Career ==
In the season 2018-19 Österman played for FBT Karhut in the Salibandyliiga (now F-liiga) he played 21 games.

In 2019 Österman went in his hometown floorball team NTK Nakkila.
