= 2024–25 Men's Floorball Champions Cup =

European floorball tournament

Men's Floorball Champions Cup
- 2024–25

Tournament information
- Sport: Floorball
- Dates: 23 August 2024–25 January 2025
- Teams: 8

Final positions
- Champions: (Sweden) Pixbo IBK (2nd title)
- Runner-up: (Czech Republic) Florbal MB

Tournament statistics
- Matches played: 13

The 2024–25 Men's Floorball Champions Cup was the 30th edition of the premier competition for floorball clubs and the second in a format for league and cup winners.

Pixbo IBK won its second title by defeating Florbal MB in finals held in Mladá Boleslav. Pixbo won also in women's tournament, becoming the first club to win both titles in the same year.

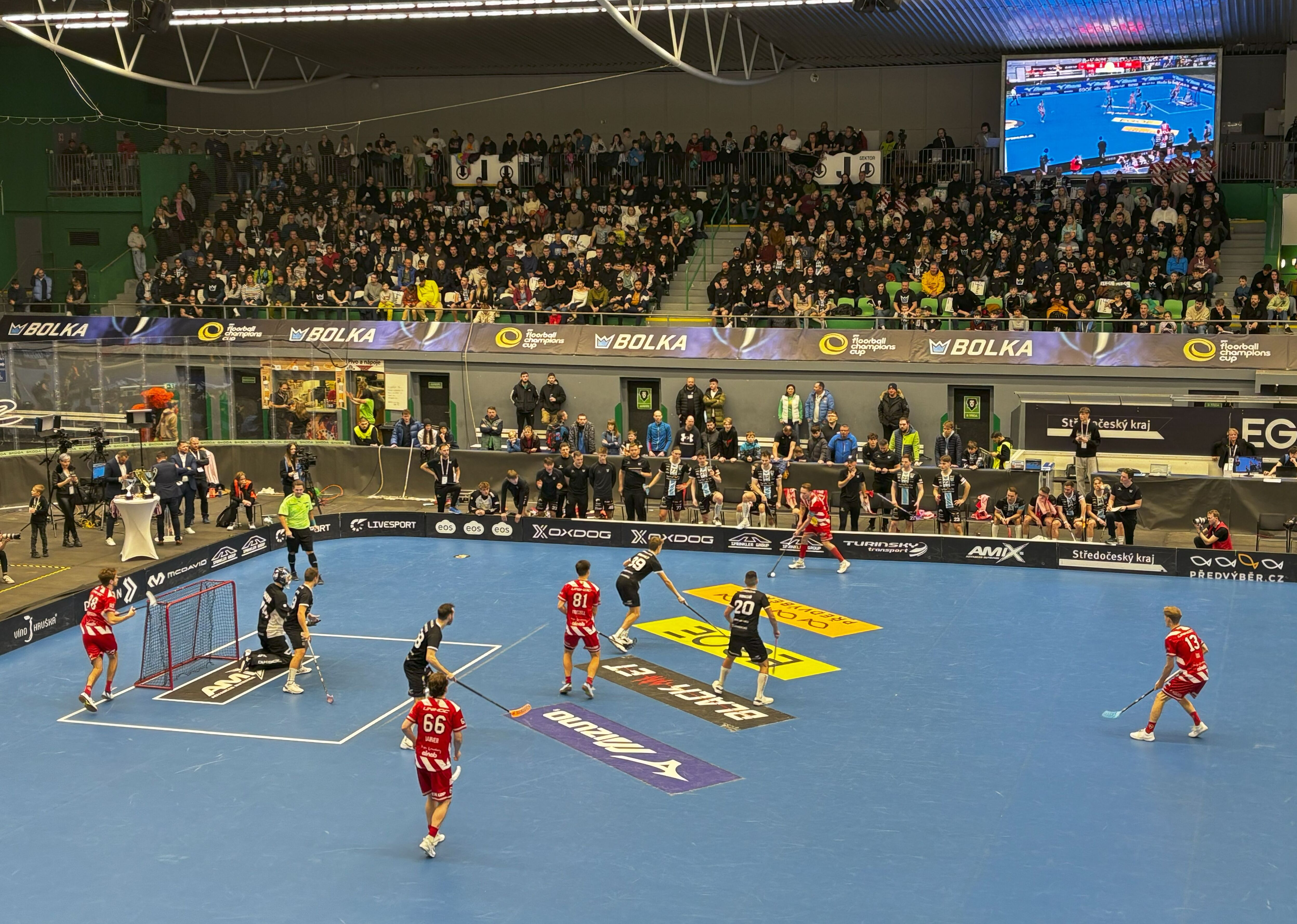
Final match between Florbal MB and Pixbo IBK in Mladá Boleslav

== Format ==
The league champions and cup winners from four countries take part. If the same team wins the league and the cup in their country, the second-place team in the league also takes part.

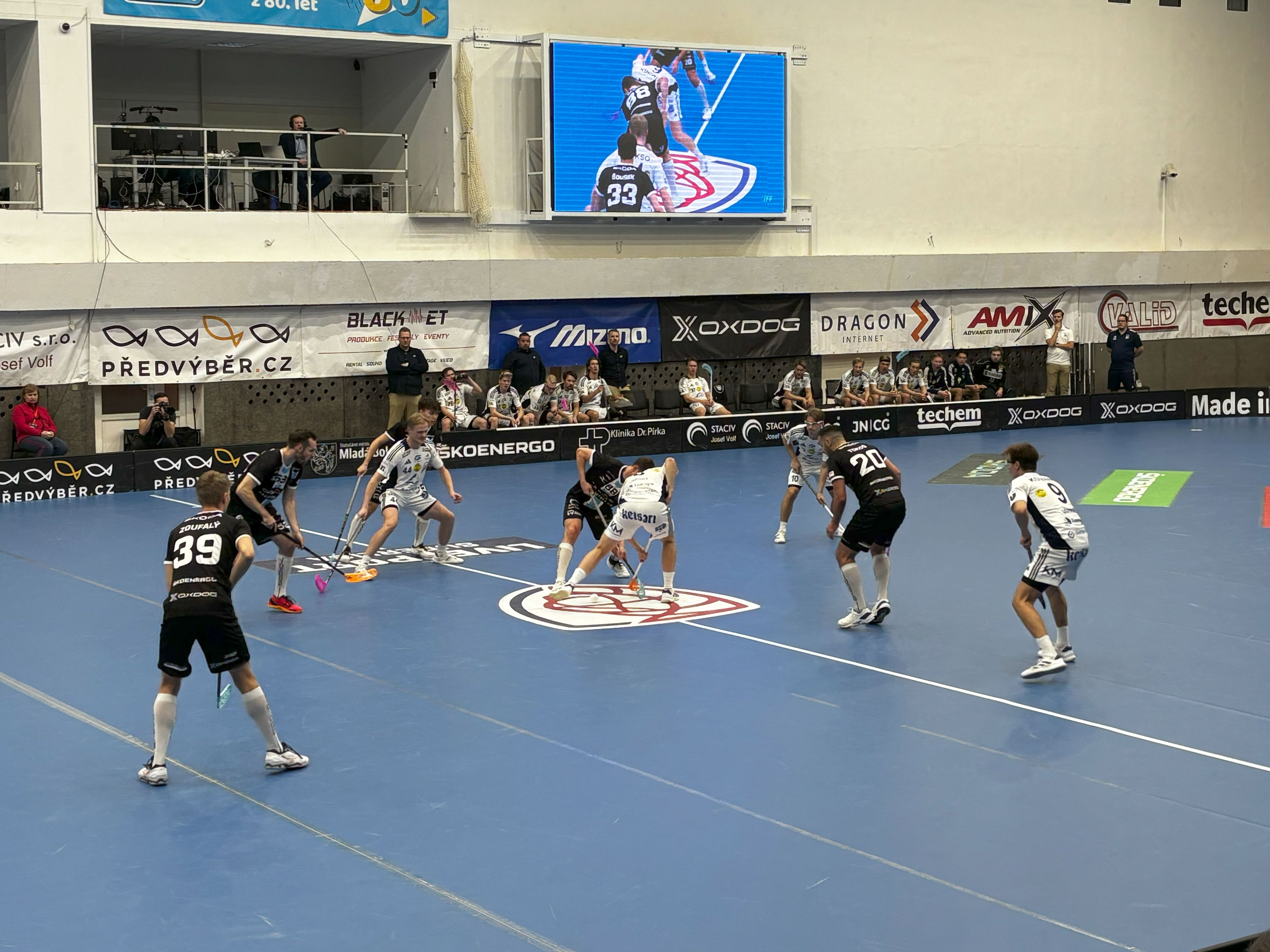
Semifinal match between Florbal MB and Nokian KrP in Mladá Boleslav

For quarterfinals the eight teams are divided into two conferences based on their geographical location. The Swedish and Finnish teams take part in the Northern conference; the clubs from the Czech Republic and Switzerland play in the Southern conference. The four winners advance to the semifinals. Quarterfinals and semifinals are played in a home and away format. If a round is undecided after the two matches, the second match is followed by an overtime. The two semifinal winners play in a final held at a centralized venue.

== Teams ==
Location of teams of the 2024–25 Floorball Champions Cup.

Conference	Country (League)	League Winner	Cup Winner/Runner-up
Northern	Sweden (Swedish Super League)	Storvreta IBK (1st)	Pixbo IBK (Cup)
Northern	Finland (F-liiga)	Esport Oilers (1st)	Nokian KrP (Cup)
Southern	Czech Republic (Livesport Superliga)	Tatran Střešovice (1st, Cup)	Florbal MB (2nd)
Southern	Switzerland (Unihockey Prime League)	Zug United (1st, Cup)	SV Wiler-Ersigen (2nd)

== Tournament ==
=== Bracket ===
Quarterfinals
(Sweden) Storvreta IBK	5	5	0
(Finland) Nokian KrP	6	5	1
(Switzerland) Zug United	1	4	0
(Czech Republic) Florbal MB	3	10	2
(Czech Republic) Tatran Střešovice	5	3	0
(Switzerland) SV Wiler-Ersigen	5	4	1
(Finland) Esport Oilers	9	4	1
(Sweden) Pixbo IBK	4	10	1 OT

Semifinals
(Finland) Nokian KrP	5	6	0
(Czech Republic) Florbal MB	8	7	2
(Switzerland) SV Wiler-Ersigen	4	6	1
(Sweden) Pixbo IBK	11	4	1 OT

Final
(Czech Republic) Florbal MB	6
(Sweden) Pixbo IBK	9

All times are local – CET/CEST, unless stated otherwise.

=== Quarterfinals ===
24 August 2024; 17:00 EEST	Nokian KrP (Finland)	6–5 (1–0, 2–3, 3–2)	(Sweden) Storvreta IBK	Nokian Palloiluareena, Nokia; Attendance: 757

Game reference

29 August 2024; 18:30	Storvreta IBK (Sweden)	5–5 (1–0, 2–3, 2–2)	(Finland) Nokian KrP	IFU Arena, Uppsala; Attendance: 749

Game reference

Nokian KrP won the series 0–1.

22 September 2024; 16:30	Florbal MB (Czech Republic)	3–1 (1–0, 1–1, 1–0)	(Switzerland) Zug United	MSH, Mladá Boleslav; Attendance: 598

Game reference

28 September 2024; 17:00	Zug United (Switzerland)	4–10 (2–3, 0–3, 2–4)	(Czech Republic) Florbal MB	Sporthalle Zug, Zug; Attendance: 550

Game reference

Florbal MB won the series 0–2.

22 September 2024; 18:00	SV Wiler-Ersigen (Switzerland)	5–5 (1–1, 1–2, 3–2)	(Czech Republic) Tatran Střešovice	Sporthalle Grossmatt, Kirchberg; Attendance: 456

Game reference

27 September 2024; 19:00	Tatran Střešovice (Czech Republic)	3–4 (0–1, 2–1, 1–2)	(Switzerland) SV Wiler-Ersigen	Sportovní Centrum Řepy, Prague; Attendance: 527

Game reference

SV Wiler-Ersigen won the series 0–1.

23 August 2024; 19:00	Pixbo IBK (Sweden)	4–9 (0–1, 4–2, 0–6)	(Finland) Esport Oilers	Wallenstam Arena, Gothenburg; Attendance: 267

Game reference

31 August 2024; 14:30 EEST	Esport Oilers (Finland)	4–10 (1–3, 2–5, 1–2)	(Sweden) Pixbo IBK	Tapiolan Urheiluhalli, Espoo; Attendance: 712

Game reference

1–1 in the series, Pixbo IBK won in Overtime.

=== Semifinals ===
3 November 2024; 16:30	Florbal MB (Czech Republic)	8–5 (2–2, 3–1, 3–2)	(Finland) Nokian KrP	MSH, Mladá Boleslav; Attendance: 715

Game reference

14 November 2024; 18:30 EET	Nokian KrP (Finland)	6–7 (1–3, 3–1, 2–3)	(Czech Republic) Florbal MB	AGCO Power Arena, Nokia; Attendance: 897

Game reference

Florbal MB won the series 2–0.

2 November 2024; 16:30	Pixbo IBK (Sweden)	11–4 (4–2, 2–0, 5–2)	(Switzerland) SV Wiler-Ersigen	Wallenstam Arena, Gothenburg; Attendance: 333

Game reference

15 November 2024; 19:00	SV Wiler-Ersigen (Switzerland)	6–4 (0–4, 1–0, 5–0)	(Sweden) Pixbo IBK	Sporthalle Grossmatt, Kirchberg; Attendance: 1,123

Game reference

1–1 in the series, Pixbo IBK won in Overtime.

=== Final ===
25 January 2025; 17:00	Florbal MB (Czech Republic)	6–9 (3–4, 2–1, 1–4)	(Sweden) Pixbo IBK	Ško-Energo Aréna, Mladá Boleslav; Attendance: 3,328

Game reference

2024–25 Men's Floorball Champions Cup Champions

Pixbo IBK
Second title

== See also ==
- 2024–25 Women's Floorball Champions Cup
