= Porvoon Salibandyseura =

Finnish sports club

- Founded: 2003
- League: Women: F-liiga
- Championships: Women: 2020–21

Porvoon Salibandyseura, also known as PSS, is a Finnish floorball club based in the city of Porvoo, after which it is named. The club was founded in 2003 through the merger of the women's clubs Gammelbackan Terä, SaFa and Porvoon Butchers.

The women's team has competed in the top-tier league, the F-liiga, since 2005. The team first reached the finals in 2008 and won the Finnish championship title in the 2020–21 season. The team has also won the Finnish Cup four times.

The men's team competes in the third-tier league, Suomisarja. Between 2006 and 2015, it played in the second-tier league, Divari.

== Women's recent seasons ==
Season	Rank	Note
2018–19	2nd	Runner-up – lost to SB-Pro in final
2019–20	–	Cancelled due to COVID-19 pandemic
2020–21	1st	Champions – defeated SB-Pro in final
2021–22	2nd	Runner-up – lost to TPS in final
2022–23	3rd	Third place win over EräViikingit
2023–24	5th	Quarterfinal loss to Loisto
2024–25	10th	—
