= Esport Oilers =

Finish floorball team

- Sport: Floorball
- Founded: 1990
- League: Men: F-liiga
- Based in: Espoo
- Arena: Men: Tapiolan urheiluhalli
- Colors
- Owner: Esport Oilers ry
- Managing director: Jouni Vehkaoja
- Head coach: Men: Aleksi Lammi
- Championships: Men: 1999, 2002, 2003, 2006, 2024, 2025; Women: 1994
- Website: Official website

The Esport Oilers (abbreviated as Oilers) is a Finnish floorball club. It was founded in 1990. The club is based in the city of Espoo in the Helsinki metropolitan area. Originally named Espoon Oilers after its home city, it was renamed in 2013 after its sponsor. With more than a thousand members, it was the second largest Finnish floorball club as of 2021. In 2017, it was the largest.

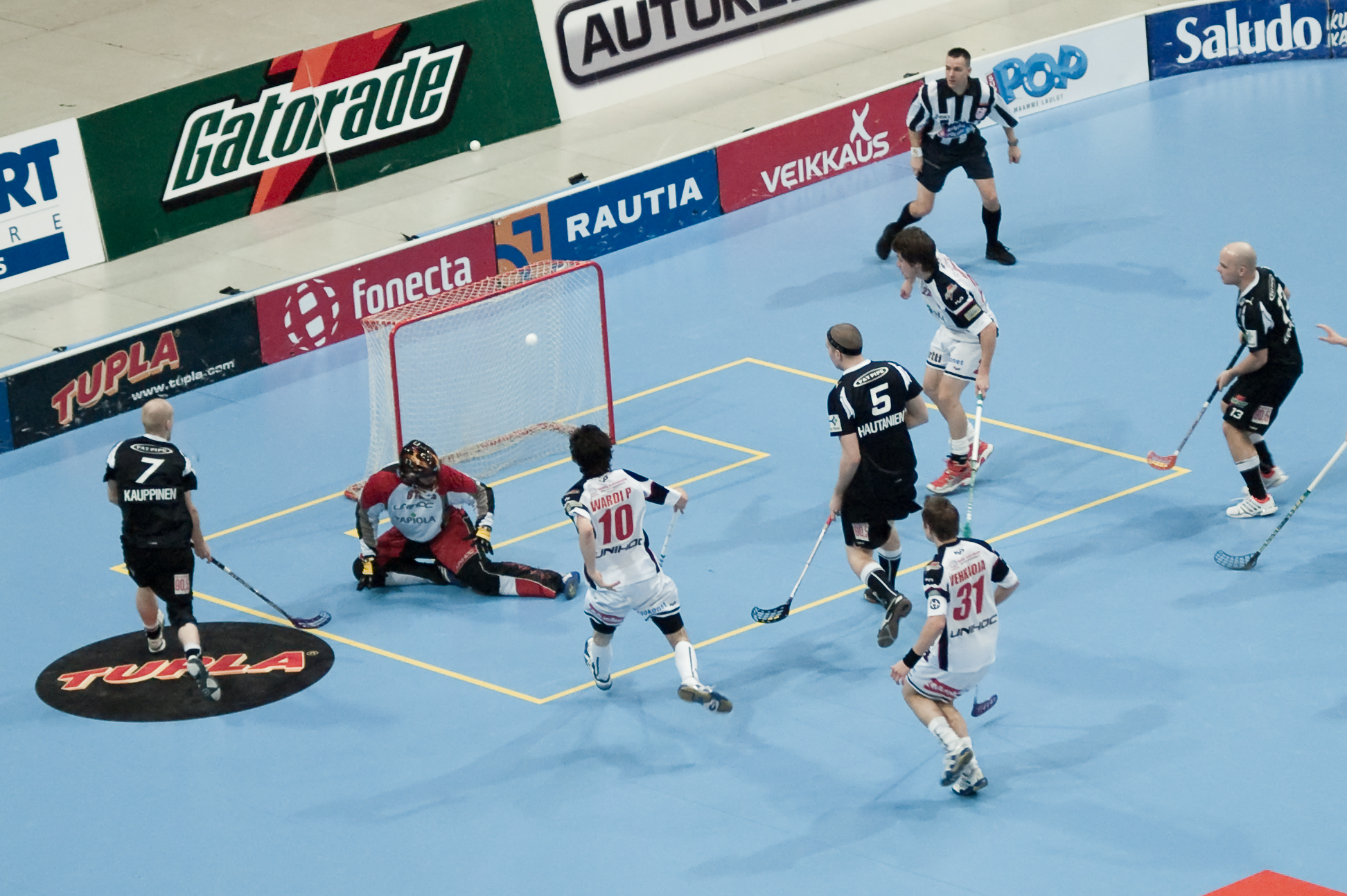
Oilers vs. TPS match in 2009

Men's team has been playing the highest Finnish league, F-liiga, since 1994–95 season. They won six championship titles in the 1998–99, 2001–02, 2002–03, 2005–06, 2023–24, and 2024–25 seasons. That makes it the second most successful team of the league, along with Classic. They also have five silver and six bronze medals. The team plays its home matches in Tapiolan urheiluhalli, which has a seating capacity of 1,570.

Women's team plays regional competitions. It has been playing in the highest league in 14 seasons, 1993–94 and 1997–98 through 2009–10. In the first of them, 1993–94, it has won a title.

== Honours ==
- Men's F-liiga titles: 1998–99, 2001–02, 2002–03, 2005–06, 2023–24, 2024–25
- Men's Suomen Cup titles: 1995–96, 2001–02
- Women's Salibandyliiga title: 1993–94

== Men's team ==
Oilers player Heikki Iiskola in 2021

=== Recent seasons ===
Season	Rank	Note
2020–21	2nd	Runner-up – lost to Classic in final
2021–22	3rd	Won 3rd place match against TPS
2022–23	3rd	Won 3rd place match against Happee
2023–24	1st	Champions – defeated Classic in final
2024–25	1st	Champions – defeated Classic in final
2025–26	3rd	Won 3rd place match against Indians

=== Champions Cup ===
Tournament	Rank	Note
1999 European Cup	3rd	Won 3rd place match against (Czech Republic) TJ Tatran Střešovice
2002–03 European Cup	3rd	Won 3rd place match against (Switzerland) UHC Alligator Malans
2003–04 European Cup	2nd	Runner-up – lost to (Sweden) Pixbo Wallenstam in final
2006–07 European Cup	3rd	Won 3rd place match against (Switzerland) UHC Alligator Malans
2025 Champions Cup	–	Quarterfinal loss to (Sweden) Pixbo IBK
2026 Champions Cup	–	Quarterfinal loss to (Sweden) IBF Falun

=== Known players ===
- Justus Kainulainen (2018–)

=== Roster ===
2024–2025
#	Player	Pos
1	Rasmus Hellsten	G
2	Aaro Astala	F
4	Ilari Talvitie	D
8	Olli Jokela	D
11	Santeri Lindfors	F
14	Jesperi Lindfors	D
15	Joona Hokkanen	F
16	Eetu Sorvali	F
17	Eetu Nykänen	D
18	Antti Suomela	D
19	Perttu Järvinen	D
22	Heikki Iiskola	F
24	Juho Seppälä	D
36	Markus Laakso	G
38	Elias Pekari	F
60	Eppu Suhanto	D
62	Matias Juuranto	D
70	Justus Mustonen	D
71	Jesper Silvonen	F
72	Markus Salmi	F
73	Justus Kainulainen	F
75	Joona Larte	F
80	Eetu Niemelä	F
88	Markus Markkola	F
92	Tuomas Iiskola	F
97	Arttu Haapala	F

Head coach	Aleksi Lammi
Coaches	Jussi Sihvonen; Mika Väisänen; Aapo Räntilä; Toni Hiekka
Team managers	Niko Kakko; Rasmus Markelin

== Records ==
=== Team records ===
- Biggest win: Oilers – LASB 27–3 (22 November 2026)
- Biggest loss: Oilers – SPV 2–11 (31 January 2015)
- Most goals scored in league history: 4913 (1994–2023)
- Most points in league history: 1129 (1994–2023)
- Most wins in a season in league history: 28 (2005–06)
- Most goals scored in a season in league history: 333 (2005–06)
- Best goal difference in a season in league history: +152 (333 – 181 2005–06)
- Most saved penalty shots in a season in league history: 8 (2007–08)

=== Individual league records ===
- Most goals in a season: 78 (Justus Kainulainen 2023-24)
- Most points in a regular season: 48 + 60 = 108 (Jaakko Hintikka 2005–06)
- Most goals in a regular season: 63 (Tero Tiitu 2005–06)
- Most power play assists in a season: 16 (Matias Kaartinen 2012–13)
- Most shorthanded goals scored in a season: 7 (Tero Tiitu 2005–06)
- Most shorthanded assists in a season: 6 (Jaakko Hintikka 2005–06)
