= Salibandy Club Classic =

Finnish floorball club

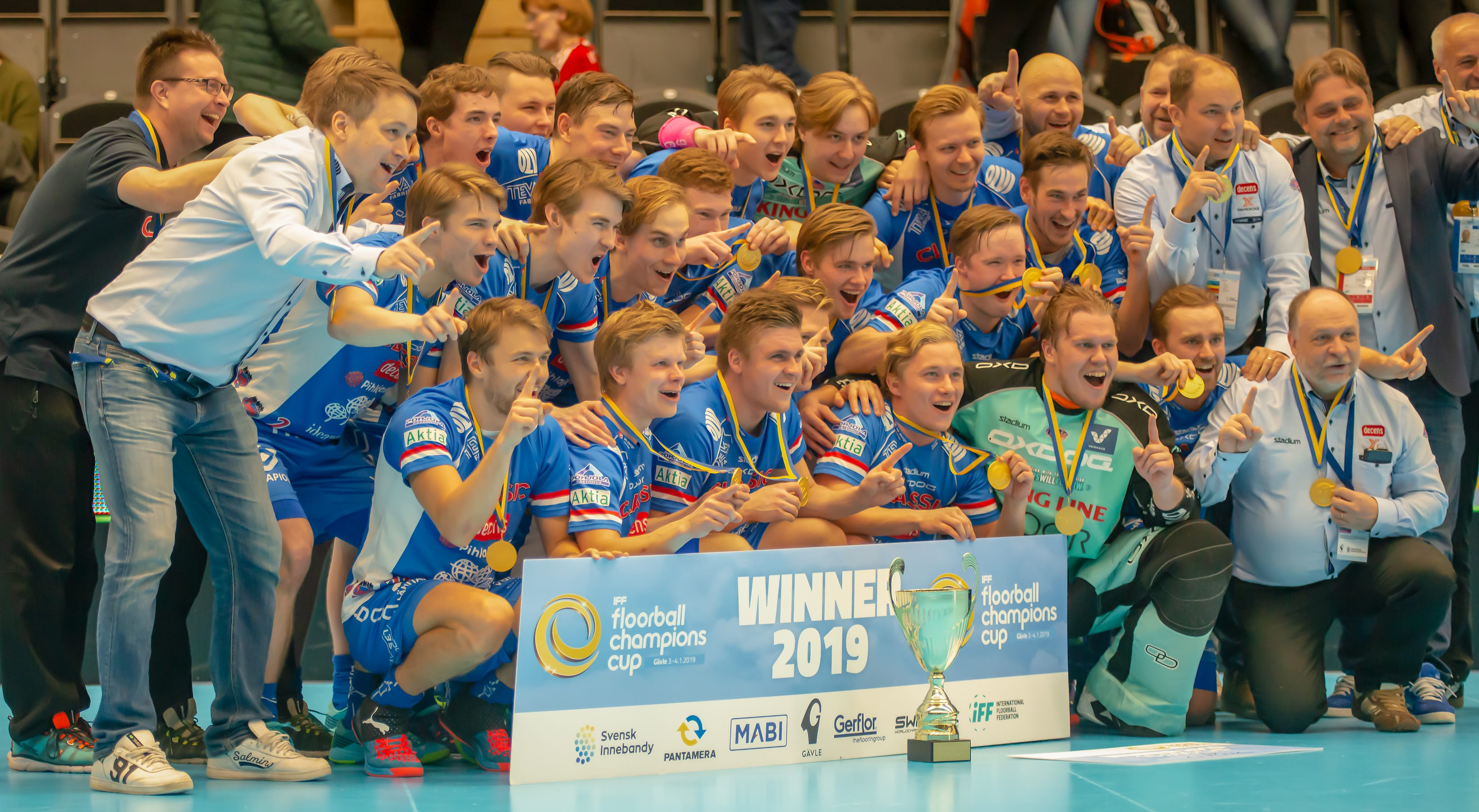
- Men's team celebrating winning the Champions Cup in 2019
- Founded: 1990
- League: Men: F-liiga; Women: F-liiga
- Championships: Men: F-liiga: (2016–2019, 2021, 2022 – 6 titles); Champions Cup (2019); Women: F-liiga (2003, 2008–2015, 2017, 2025 – 10 titles); Champions Cup (2004)

Salibandy Club Classic, also known as SC Classic, is a Finnish floorball club from Tampere. It was founded in 1990.

The men's team has played in the top competition, the F-liiga, since the 2000–01 season. Between 2016 and 2022 they won six championship titles in a row. They are, together with the Esport Oilers, the second most successful Finnish team. In 2019, the men's team won the Champions Cup.

Women's final against SB-Pro in 2013

The women's team has also played in the top competition, the F-liiga, since the 1997–98 season. With ten titles, they are the most successful team in the league. Between 2008 and 2013 they won six championships in a row. They have also four more golds from the 2002–03, 2014–15, 2016–17, and 2024–25 seasons. In the 2003–04 season, the women won the Champions Cup.

== Men's team seasons ==
Season	Rank	Note
2017–18	1st	Champions – defeated Happee in final
2018–19	1st	Champions – defeated TPS in final
2019–20	The season was cancelled	
2020–21	1st	Champions – defeated Oilers in final
2021–22	1st	Champions – defeated Nokian KrP in final
2022–23	5th	Quarterfinal loss to Oilers
2023–24	2nd	Runner-up – lost to Oilers in final
2024–25	2nd	Runner-up – lost to Oilers in final
2025–26	2nd	Runner-up – lost to Nokian KrP in final

== Women's team seasons ==
Season	Rank	Note
2017–18	2nd	Runner-up – lost to SB-Pro in final
2018–19	8th	Quarterfinal loss to PSS
2019–20	The season was cancelled	
2020–21	4th	Lost third-place match to SSRA
2021–22	4th	Lost third-place match to EräViikingit
2022–23	2nd	Runner-up – lost to TPS in final
2023–24	2nd	Runner-up – lost to TPS in final
2024–25	1st	Champions – defeated TPS in final
2025–26	2nd	Runner-up – lost to TPS in final
