= Finnish Floorball Federation =

Governing body of floorball in Finland

Finnish Floorball Federation SSBL
- IOC nation: FIN
- Sport: Floorball
- Official website: salibandy.fi

History
- Year of formation: 23 September 1985; 39 years ago

Affiliations
- International federation: International Floorball Federation (IFF)
- IFF member since: 12 April 1986; 39 years ago

Elected
- President: Matti Ahde

Founded on 23 September 1985, the Finnish Floorball Federation (SSBL) (Finnish: Suomen Salibandyliitto, Swedish: Finlands Innebandyförbund) is the governing body for floorball in the country of Finland. The SSBL's number of professional licensed players is 39,104 (in May 2006), making it the nation's third most popular sport, after association football and ice hockey.

The SSBL organizes the Salibandyliiga and Finnish Floorball Cup competitions. Alongside the top National Floorball League, there is another league where over 1800 teams compete in 10 divisions (6 male, 4 female).

== Organisation ==
The clubs competing in the SSBL divisions are represented on the "Congress", with a number of votes (between one and three) proportional to the number of registered players at a club. The Congress functions as the electorate for the Council members and SSBL Board, which has nine members with two-year terms.

The SSBL has regional offices in Joensuu, Lappeenranta, Oulu, Seinäjoki, Tampere and Turku, alongside the head office, which is based in Helsinki.

== See also ==
- F-liiga – men's top floorball league in Finland
- F-liiga (women) – women's top floorball league in Finland
- Finland men's national floorball team
- Finland women's national floorball team
