= Nokian KrP =

Finnish sports club

- Full name: Nokian Kristityt Palloilijat
- Founded: 1997
- League: F-liiga
- Championships: F-liiga (2026)

Nokian KrP is a floorball club based in Nokia, Finland.

The club was founded in 1997, as a pentecostal church hobby club, what is reflected in its original full name Nokian Kristityt Palloilijat (Nokia Christian Athletes).

== Men's team ==
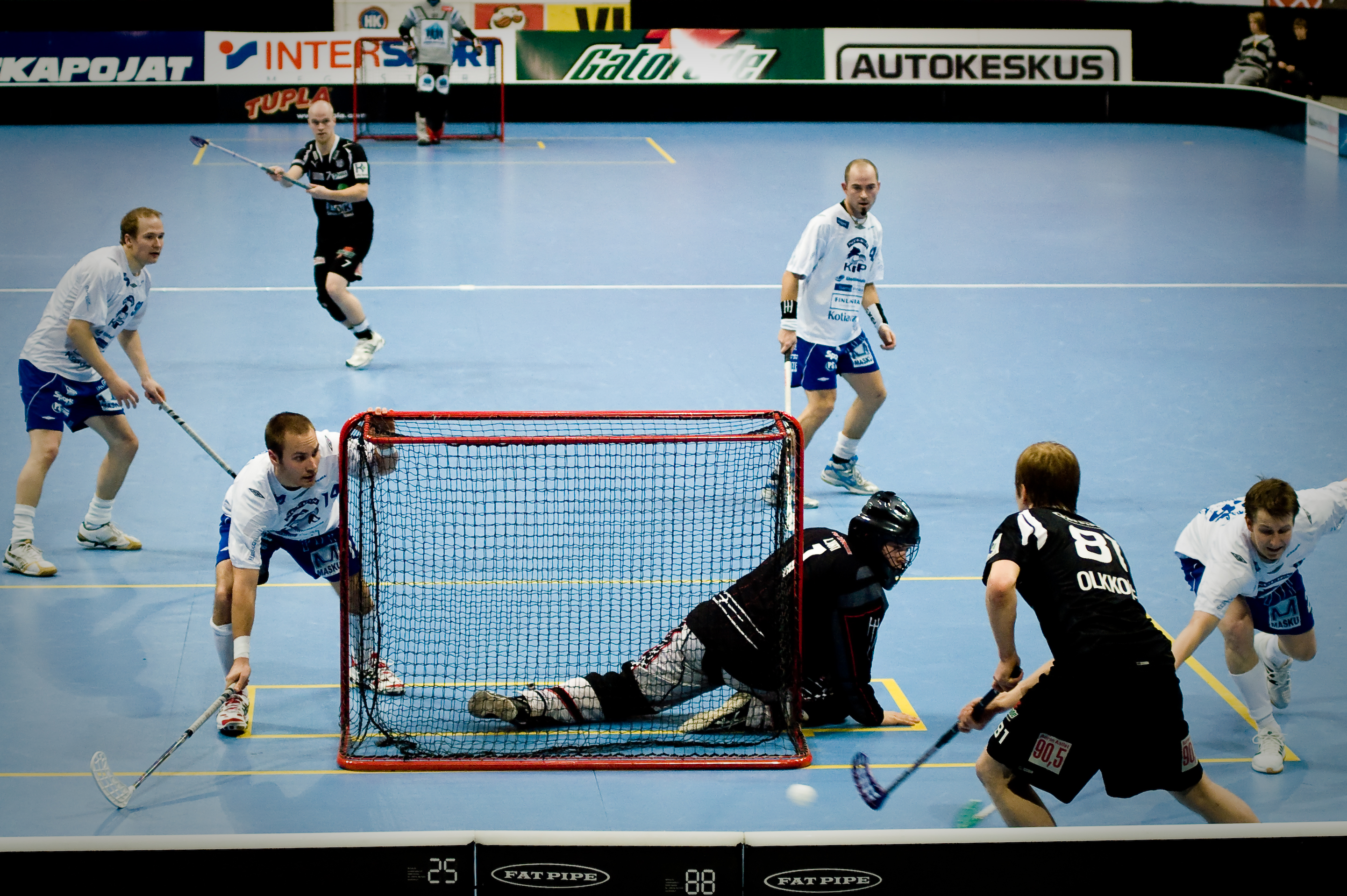
Players of Nokian KrP (in white) in a match against TPS in 2008

The men's team has been playing since 2008–09 season in the top Finnish competition, the F-liiga. In 2017–18 season they won their first bronze medal and in 2021–22 season their first vice-championship. In the next year, 2022–23, the men won the regular season, but lost again in the finals. In 2024 they won the Finish cup for the first time. They claimed their first league title in the 2025–26 season.

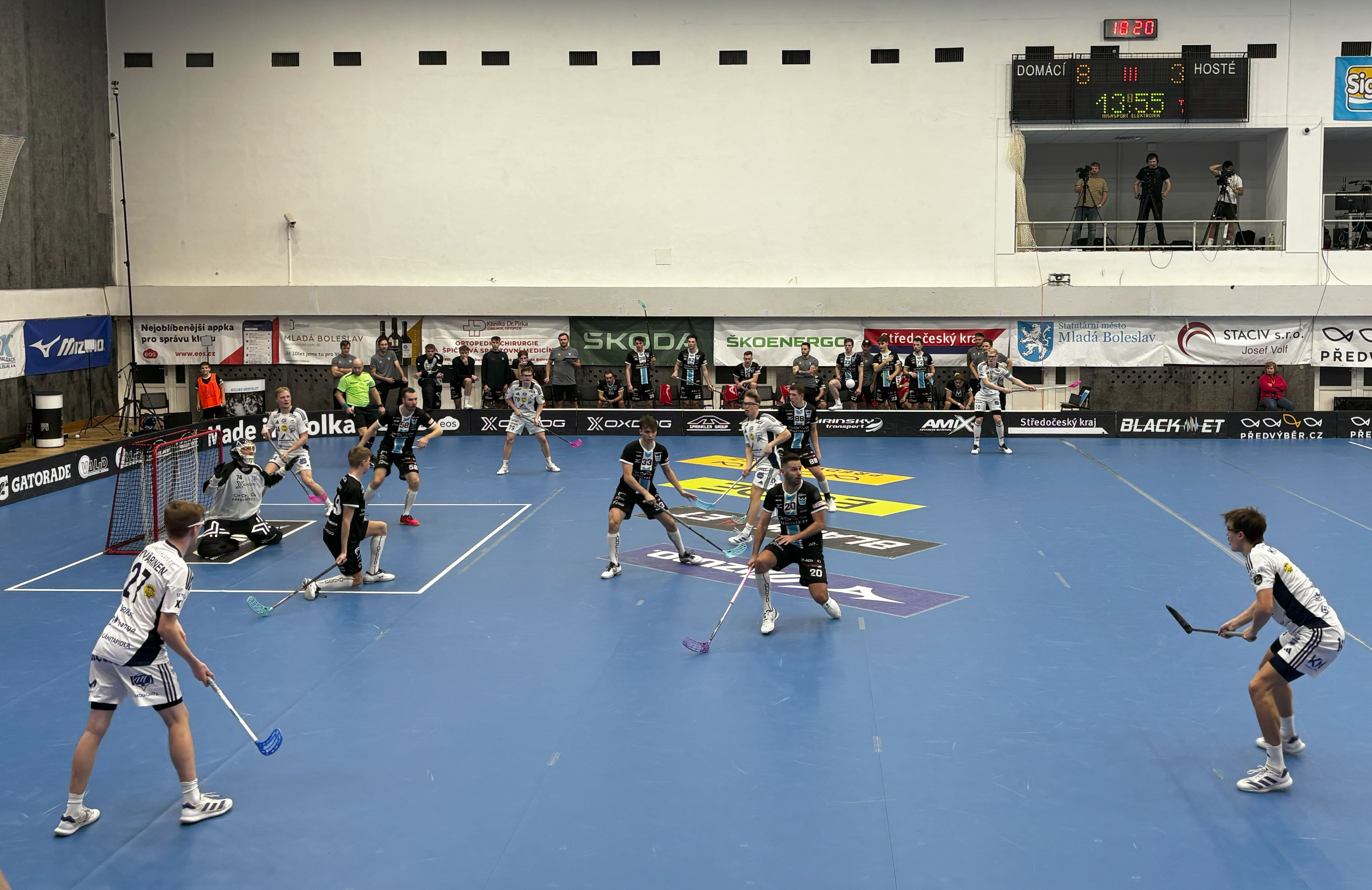
Players of Nokian KrP (in white) in the 2024–25 Champions Cup semifinal against Florbal MB

=== Recent seasons ===
Season	Rank	Note
2020–21	3rd	Third place win over TPS
2021–22	2nd	Runner-up – lost to Classic in final
2022–23	2nd	Runner-up – lost to TPS in final
2023–24	3rd	Third place win over Indians
2024–25	5th	Quarterfinal loss to SPV
2025–26	1st	Champions – defeated Classic in final

=== Champions Cup ===
Tournament	Rank	Note
2025 Champions Cup	–	Semifinal loss to (Czech Republic) Florbal MB
2026 Champions Cup	–	Quarterfinal loss to (Sweden) Storvreta IBK
2027 Champions Cup	–	
