= F-liiga (women) =

- Formerly: Salibandyn naisten SM-sarja
- Sport: Floorball
- Founded: 1988; 38 years ago
- First season: as Salibandyn naisten SM-sarja, 1988–89 as Naisten Salibandyliiga, 2000–01
- Director: Kimmo Nurminen
- Administrator: Finnish Floorball Federation
- No. of teams: 16
- Country: Finland
- Most recent champion: TPS (4th title) (2025–26)
- Most titles: Classic (10 titles)
- Broadcaster: Yle TV2
- Level on pyramid: Level 1
- International cup: Champions Cup
- Website: Fliiga.com

F-liiga is the highest-tier of floorball for women in Finland. The league was founded as Salibandyn naisten SM-sarja in 1988.

The league consists of 12 teams. The champion of the league is eligible to compete at the Champions Cup.

The most successful team in the league, with ten titles is Classic. The current champion from the 2025–26 season is the TPS, who claimed their fourth title.

== Format ==
=== Regular season ===
In the regular season, which takes place approximately from September to March, all teams play each other twice (a total of 22 rounds).

=== Playoffs ===
The top eight teams from the regular season play for the Finnish championship, in playoffs that start around March and culminate in April. For quarterfinals, the top three teams from the regular season successively choose their quarterfinal opponents from the four remaining teams. The semifinal pairings are determined by the regular season standings. The quarterfinals and semifinals are in best-of-five format. The finals is played in best-of-seven format. The losing semifinalists play a single match for the bronze medal.

=== Playout ===
Starting with the 2025–26 season, the last-place team is automatically relegated and replaced by the winner of the lower competition final (called Division, Divari in Finnish, or Inssi-Divari for sponsorship reasons). The second-to-last team plays a relegation playoff against the runner-up of the Divari final.

== History ==
The league was founded as Salibandyn naisten SM-sarja (English: Floorball Women Finnish Champions-Series) in 1988 by the Finnish Floorball Federation (SSBL). It was renamed to Naisten Salibandyliiga for the 2000–01 season. The current name F-liiga is used since season 2020–21. The F-liiga is operated by SSBL Salibandy Oy, a limited corporation owned entirely by the Finnish Floorball Federation.

Starting with the 2015–16 season, the league adopted the Superfinal system, a single championship game to decide the title. However, after three years, it returned to a final series format.

== Current teams ==
Location of teams in the league

Updated for the 2026–27 season.

- Classic (Tampere)
- EräViikingit (Helsinki)
- FBC Loisto (Turku)
- Koovee (Tampere)
- Northern Stars (Espoo)
- Pirkat (Pirkkala)
- PSS (Porvoo)
- SB-Pro (Nurmijärvi)
- SBS Wirmo (Mynämäki)
- SPV (Seinäjoki)
- SSRA (Oulu)
- TPS (Turku)

== Recent medalists ==
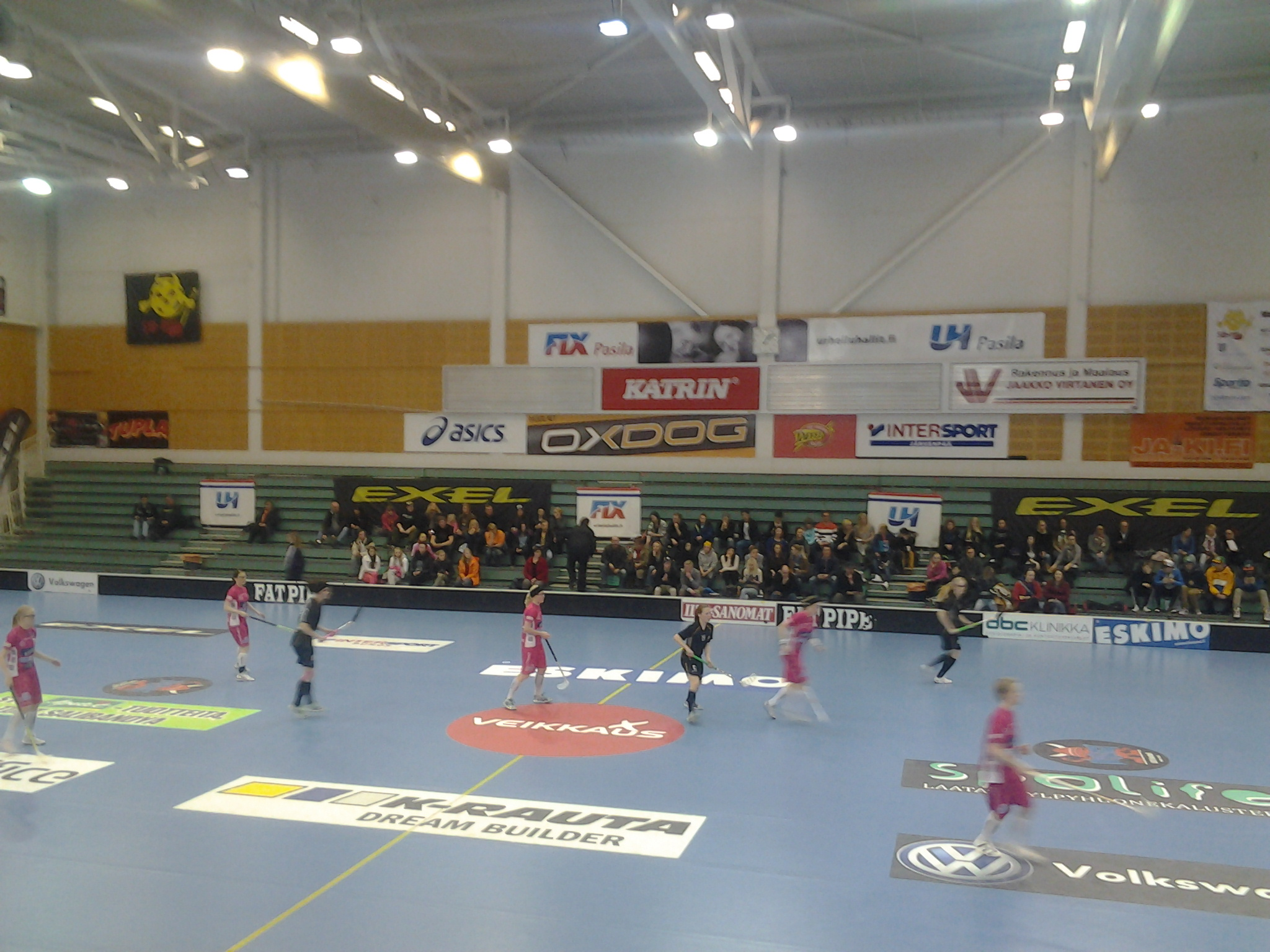
SB-Pro battle Classic in the 2013–14 finals

Season	Champions	Runner-up	Third Place
2025–26	TPS	Classic	SB-Pro
2024–25	Classic	TPS	EräViikingit
2023–24	TPS	Classic	FBC Loisto
2022–23	TPS	Classic	PSS
2021–22	TPS	PSS	EräViikingit
2020–21	PSS	SB-Pro	SSRA
2019–20	Cancelled due to COVID-19 pandemic		
2018–19	SB-Pro	PSS	Koovee
2017–18	SB-Pro	Classic	EräViikingit
2016–17	Classic	SB-Pro	PSS
2015–16	NST	Classic	SB-Pro
2014–15	Classic	SB-Pro	NST
2013–14	SB-Pro	Classic	Happee
2012–13	Classic	SB-Pro	OLS
2011–12	Classic	SB-Pro	NST
2010–11	Classic	NST	SB-Pro
2009–10	Classic	SB-Pro	NST
2008–09	Classic	Happee	NST
2007–08	Classic	PSS	NST
2006–07	Erä III	NST	PSS
2005–06	NST	Classic	Oilers
2004–05	Tiikerit	Erä III	NST

== List of champions ==
Team	Titles	Season
Classic	10	2002–03, 2007–08, 2008–09, 2009–10, 2010–11, 2011–12, 2012–13, 2014–15, 2016–17, 2024–25
TPS	4	2021–22, 2022–23, 2023–24, 2025–26
Erä III Helsinki	4	1995–96, 1996–97, 1999–00, 2006–07
SB-Pro Nurmijärvi	3	2013–14, 2017–18, 2018–19
Erä I Helsinki	3	1991–92, 1992–93, 1994–95
VFT Vantaa	3	1997–98, 1998–99, 2003–04
NST Lappeenranta	2	2005–06, 2015–16
HIFK Helsinki	2	2000–01, 2001–02
S.C. Dalmac Helsinki	2	1989–90, 1990–91
PSS	1	2020–21
BET Jyväskylä	1	1988–89
Oilers Espoo	1	1993–94
Tiikerit Vantaa	1	2004–05

Updated as of the 2025–26 season

== Records ==
=== Regular season ===
==== Game records ====
- Highest attendance : 693
  - Classic vs. Happee (13–2), 02-19-2011
- Biggest home win: 18–0
  - SB-Pro vs. Sheriffs (18–0), 01-30-2013
- Biggest away win: 1–23
  - SSV vs. Erä III (1–23), 02-18-2006
- Highest scoring game: 24 goals
  - Josba vs. PE Åland (19–5), 01-06-2006

==== Individual records ====
===== Career =====
- Most games played: 346
  - (Finland) Maria Repo
- Most goals: 365
  - (Finland) Katariina Saarinen
- Most assists: 244
  - (Finland) Katariina Saarinen
- Most points: 609
  - (Finland) Katariina Saarinen

===== Season =====
- Most goals: 56
  - (Finland) Eliisa Alanko (Classic), 2012–13
- Most assists: 68
  - (Finland) Elina Kujala (SB-Pro), 2013–14
- Most points: 83
  - (Finland) Elina Kujala (SB-Pro), 2013–14

=== Playoffs ===
==== Game records ====
- Highest attendance : 1039
  - NST vs. Classic (5–4), 04-07-2006
- Biggest win: 15–0
  - Classic vs. PSS (14–2), 03-12-2011
- Highest scoring game: 17 goals
  - VFT vs. Josba (14–3), 03-05-2004

==== Individual records ====
===== Career =====
- Most games played: 140
  - (Finland) Katriina Saarinen
- Most goals: 118
  - (Finland) Katriina Saarinen
- Most assists: 73
  - (Finland) Niina Rantala
- Most points: 190
  - (Finland) Katriina Saarinen

===== Season =====
- Most goals: 19
  - (Finland) Eliisa Alanko (Classic), 2012–13
- Most assists: 17
  - (Finland) Niina Rantala (Classic), 2012–13
- Most points: 29
  - (Finland) Petra Mäntynen (Classic), 2002–03

All records updated as of season 2013–14.
