= Turun Palloseura (floorball) =

Finnish sports club

- Founded: 1995
- Arena: Kupittaan palloiluhalli
- Capacity: 2500
- League: Men: F-liiga; Women: F-liiga
- Championships: Men: 2022–23; Women: 2021–22, 2022–23, 2023–24
Home colors	Away colors

Turun Palloseura Salibandy, also known as TPS Salibandy or simply TPS, is a floorball department of the eponymous sports club. The club is based in and named after Finnish town Turku. The club includes also a football and ice hockey team. The floorball department was founded in 1995.

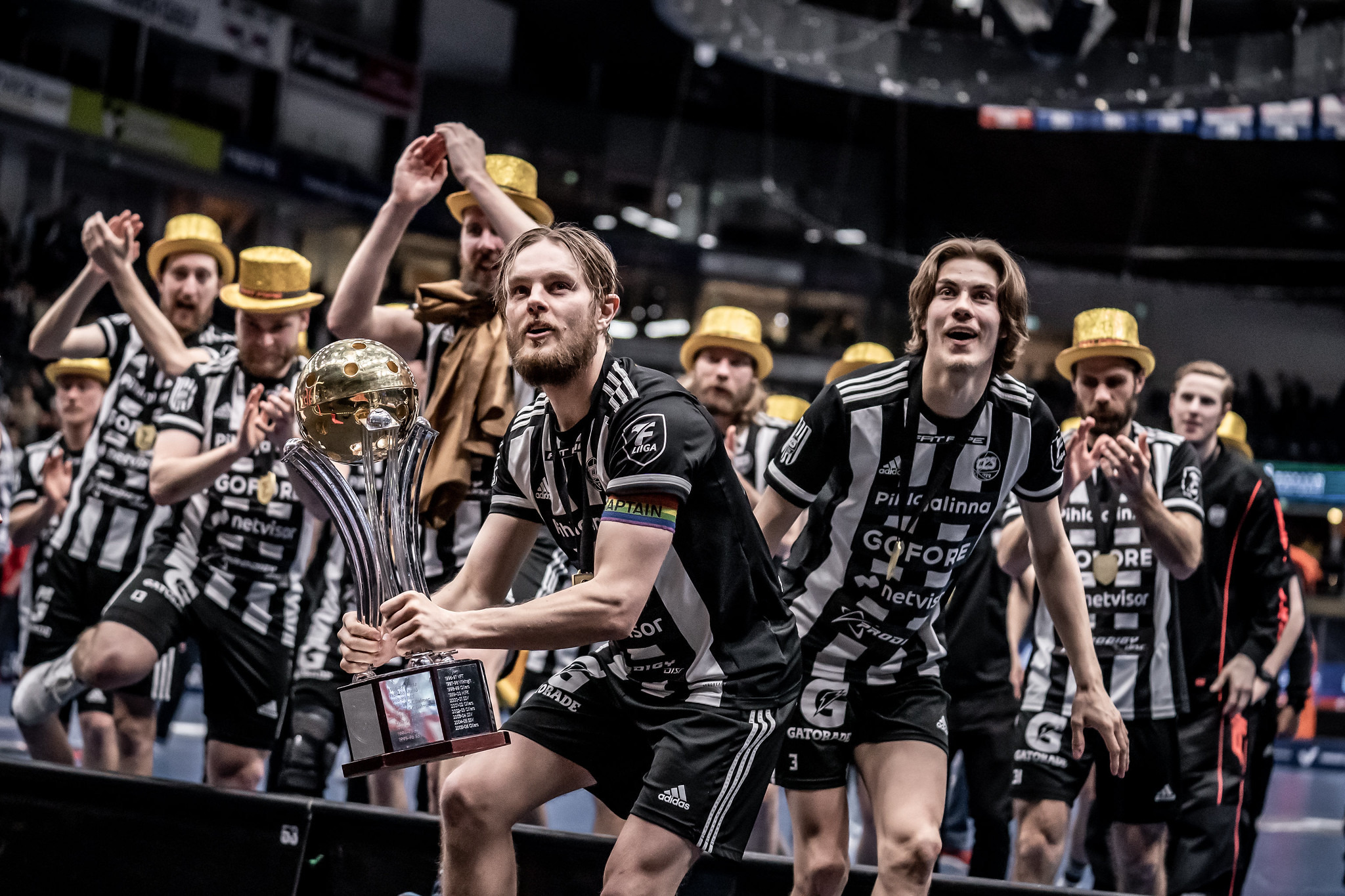
Men's team celebrating winning the title in the 2022–23 season

The men's team plays in the top Finnish competition, the F-liiga. The team was formed in 1995 by taking over the rights and players of I.K.A. SBS, which had just dropped out of the top competition. It wasn't until the end of 2006–07 season when men won the I-division and rose again to then Salibandyliiga. In the 2018–19 season, they reached the finals for the first time, and in the 2022–23 season they won their first championship title.

The women's team also plays in the top competition, the F-liiga. The team was founded in 1996 and started in the lowest competition. They have gradually worked their way up to the top competition, which they have played since the 2007–08 season, except for one-year relegation in 2011–12 season. They have won three championship titles in a row in the 2021–22 through 2023–24 seasons. They went through the 2022–23 season to victory without a single loss.

== Men's recent seasons ==
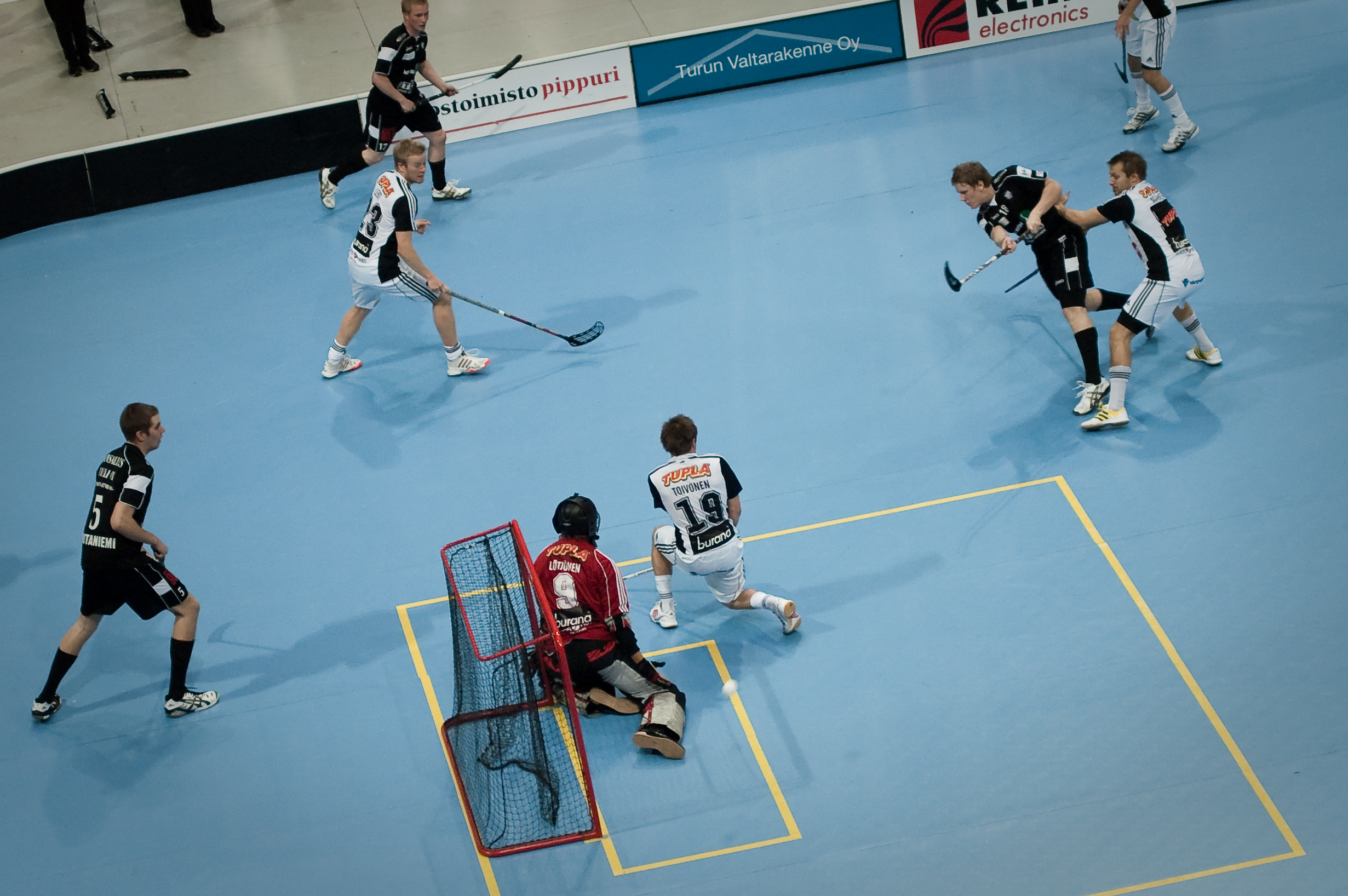
TPS players (in black) in 2009 match against SSV

Season	Rank	Note
2020–21	4th	Third place loss to Nokian KrP
2021–22	4th	Third place loss to Oilers
2022–23	1st	Champions – defeated Nokian KrP in final
2023–24	5th	Quarterfinal loss to Indians
2024–25	6th	Quarterfinal loss to Indians

== Women's recent seasons ==
Season	Rank	Note
2020–21	–	Quarterfinal loss to SB-Pro
2021–22	1st	Champions – defeated PSS in final
2022–23	1st	Champions – defeated Classic in final
2023–24	1st	Champions – defeated Classic in final
2024–25	2nd	Runner-up – lost to Classic in final
