= SSV Helsinki =

Finnish floorball team

- Full name: Salibandyseura Viikingit
- Short name: SSV
- Founded: 1986
- Dissolved: 2017
- Arena: Pasila Sports Hall
- Capacity: 1700-2400
- Coach: (Finland) Mika Ahonen
- Captain: (Finland) Mikael Järvi
- League: Salibandyliiga
- All-time top scorer: (Finland) Mikael Järvi (396 goals)
- Championships: Salibandyliiga (11 titles); Suomen Cup (6 titles); EuroFloorball Cup (1 title); EuroFloorball Champions Cup (1 title)
Home colors	Away colors

SSV Helsinki is a floorball team based in Helsinki, Finland. The team was founded in 1986 and they currently play in Salibandyliiga, the top floorball league in Finland.

== History ==
SSV Helsinki was founded in 1986 and was originally named Salibandy Sulkapallo Vuosaari. They got their current name in 2000 after merging with another local team Vuosaaren Viikingit. SSV played their first official game in the 1987–88 season of the I Divisioona (English: Men's First Division). They were promoted to Salibandyliiga for the 1988–89 season and snatched their first title in the 1992–93 season.

SSV played in the very first EuroFloorball Cup in 1993 and made their way to the finals where they lost to Balrog IK (9-2). The team finally grabbed their first EuroFloorball Cup in 2009 after having lost all their 4 previous appearances in the finals. In the final match SSV beat their Finnish rivals Tapanilan Erä 6–5 in overtime.

== Honours ==
=== Titles ===
- Salibandyliiga champions: 11
  - 1992–93, 1994–95, 1995–96, 2000–01, 2003–04, 2004–05, 2006–07, 2007–08, 2008–09, 2009–10, 2010–11
- Suomen Cup champions: 6
  - 1994–95, 1998–99, 2000–01, 2004–05, 2005–06, 2006–07
- EuroFloorball Cup champions: 1
  - 2009
- EuroFloorball Champions Cup champions: 1
  - 2011

=== Retired numbers ===
Number	Player
#4	Markku Suomela
#6	Esa Karjalainen
#14	Jarmo Perttilä
#20	Heikki Vienola
#22	Jari Pekkola
#52	Santtu Manner
