= Tikkurilan Tiikerit =

- Founded: 1997
- Championships: Naisten Salibandyliiga (2004-05)

Tikkurilan Tiikerit is a Finnish floorball club from Vantaa. By licensed players, it is the fourth largest floorball club in Finland. It has 837 licensed players and over one thousand members.

Tikkurilan Tiikerit has a 2 women's floorball teams and 4 men's teams. Both men's and women's first teams play in regional series.

In addition to the men's and women's teams, the club also has 25 junior teams (20 boys, 5 girls).

== 2011-12 Roster ==
=== Women's ===
Goalkeepers:

- 1 - Laura Still
- 23 - Pauliina Pekki
- 81 - Arla Salo

Defenders:

- 5 - Silja Eskelinen
- 9 - Jemina Luumi
- 14 - Mandi Helin
- 20 - Annina Mero
- 24 - Mia Karjalainen
- 25 - Gitta Suominen
- 27 - Miia Saari
- 71 - Laura Manninen

Forwards:

- 4 - Kaisa Simola
- 8 - Marjut Kinnunen
- 10 - Marianne Kinnunen
- 12 - Janica Ignatius
- 15 - Elina Enlund "C"
- 16 - Elina Sormunen
- 17 - Oona-Mikaela Kyllönen
- 21 - Siru Karjalainen
- 22 - Noona Björkman
- 28 - Aliisa Syrjänen
- 64 - Salla Ronkainen

== Honours ==
- 2004-05 Naisten Salibandyliiga champions
