= Tapanilan Erä =

Finnish sports club

- Founded: 1933 (sports club); 1990 (floorball); 1997 (Kendo); 2008 (ZNKR Jōdō)
- Coach: Floorball: Petteri Bergman (men); Kati Suomela (women); Kendo: Kari Jääskeläinen; ZNKR Jōdō: Jarkko Lakkisto
- League: Salibandyliiga (floorball)

Tapanilan Erä is a Finnish sports club that was founded in 1933, with various teams in different disciplines. It is one of Finland's largest sporting clubs.

== Disciplines ==
=== Martial Arts ===
- Boxing
- Judo
- Jujitsu
- Karate
- Kendo
- Ki-Aikido
- ZNKR Jōdō

=== Other ===
- Archery
- Athletics
- Badminton
- Ballet
- Bowling
- Fencing
- Floorball
- Rhythmic Gymnastics
- Tennis
- Volleyball

== Floorball ==
The club's department of floorball was founded in 1990. In terms of licensed players, Erä's department of floorball is the fifth largest floorball club in Finland with 628 licensed players. Both the men's and women's teams play in the Finland's top floorball league, Salibandyliiga. The club also has 9 junior teams (5 boys, 4 girls).

=== Team Achievements ===
==== Men's ====
- 2007 Finnish Cup Champions

==== Women's ====
- 1996 Naisten Salibandyliiga Champions
- 1997 Naisten Salibandyliiga Champions
- 1999 EuroFloorball Cup Champions
- 2000 Naisten Salibandyliiga Champions
- 2007 Naisten Salibandyliiga Champions

==== Juniors ====
- 2004 Czech Open Junior Division Champions
