= SB-Pro =

Finnish floorball club from Nurmijärvi

- Full name: SB-Pro
- Founded: 1996
- Arena: Arkadia Hall, Klaukkala, Nurmijärvi, Finland
- Coach: Tuomas Ollikainen(women's team)
- League: Women's Floorball League
| Home colors | Away colors |

SB-Pro is a floorball club from Nurmijärvi, Finland. The women's first team plays in the Naisten Salibandyliiga (Women's Floorball League) and the men's first team in the V-Division. There are 532 members in the club (2012 stats) and 21 teams in the Finnish Floorball Federation. SB-Pro has won the Women's Championship of Finland in 2014, 2018 and 2019.

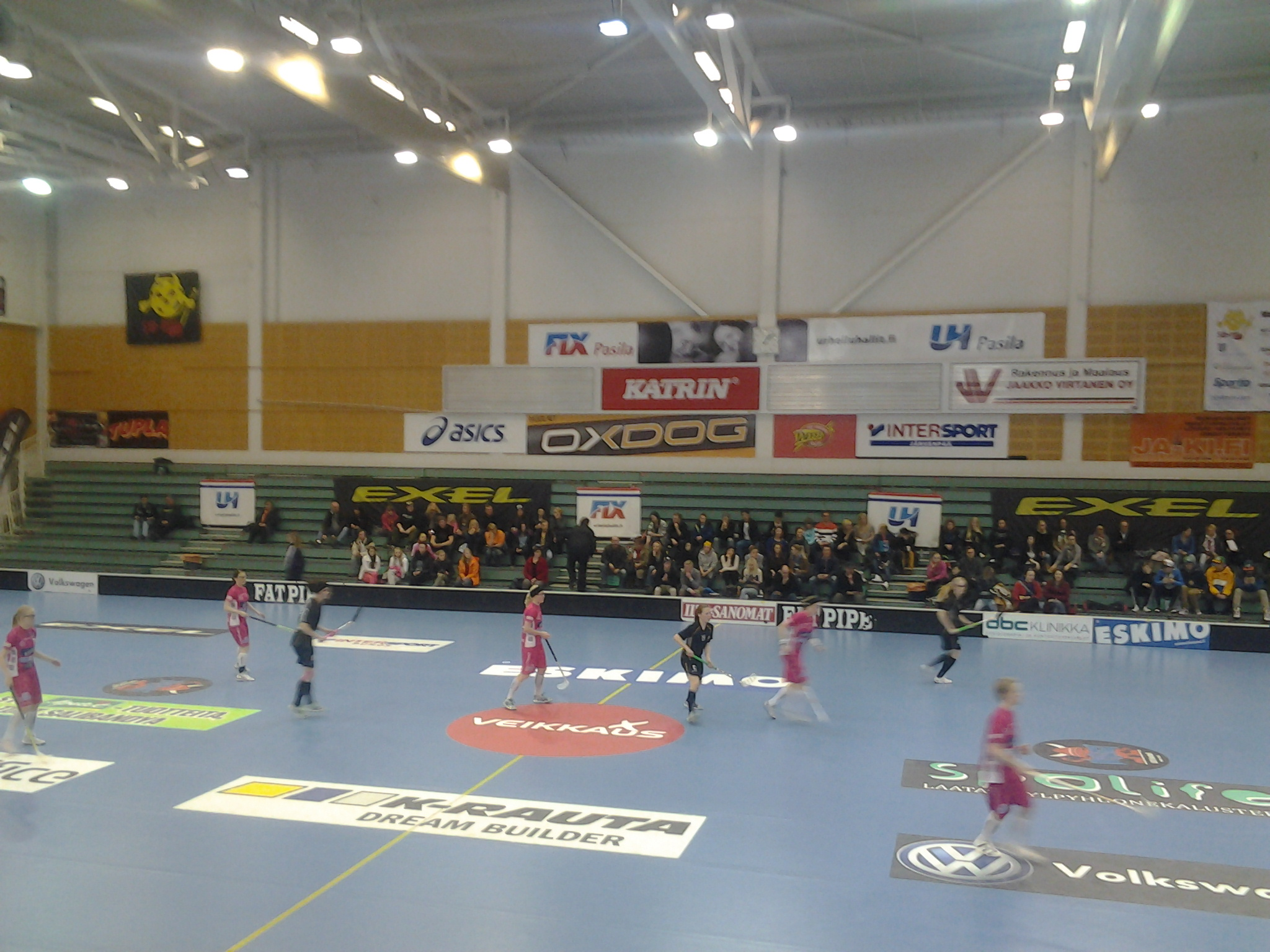
SB-Pro battle Classic in the 2013-14 finals
