= F-liiga =

Miesten F-liiga
- Formerly: Miesten Mestaruussarja; Miesten Salibandyliiga
- Sport: Floorball
- Founded: 1986; 40 years ago
- First season: Salibandyn SM-sarja; 1986–1994; Salibandyliiga; 1994–2020
- Administrator: Finnish Floorball Federation
- No. of teams: 12
- Country: Finland
- Most recent champion: Nokian KrP (2025–26, 1st title)
- Most titles: SSV Helsinki (11 titles, last in 2010–11)
- Broadcaster: Yle TV2
- Level on pyramid: Level 1
- Domestic cup: Suomen Cup
- International cup: Champions Cup
- Website: Fliiga.com

The F-liiga is the top men's floorball league in Finland. The league was founded in 1986 by the Finnish Floorball Federation (SSBL).

The league consists of 12 teams. The champion of the league is eligible to compete at the Champions Cup.

The most successful team in the league is SSV (now EräViikingit), with eleven titles, most recently winning in 2011. The current champion from the 2025–26 season is the Nokian KrP, who claimed their first title.

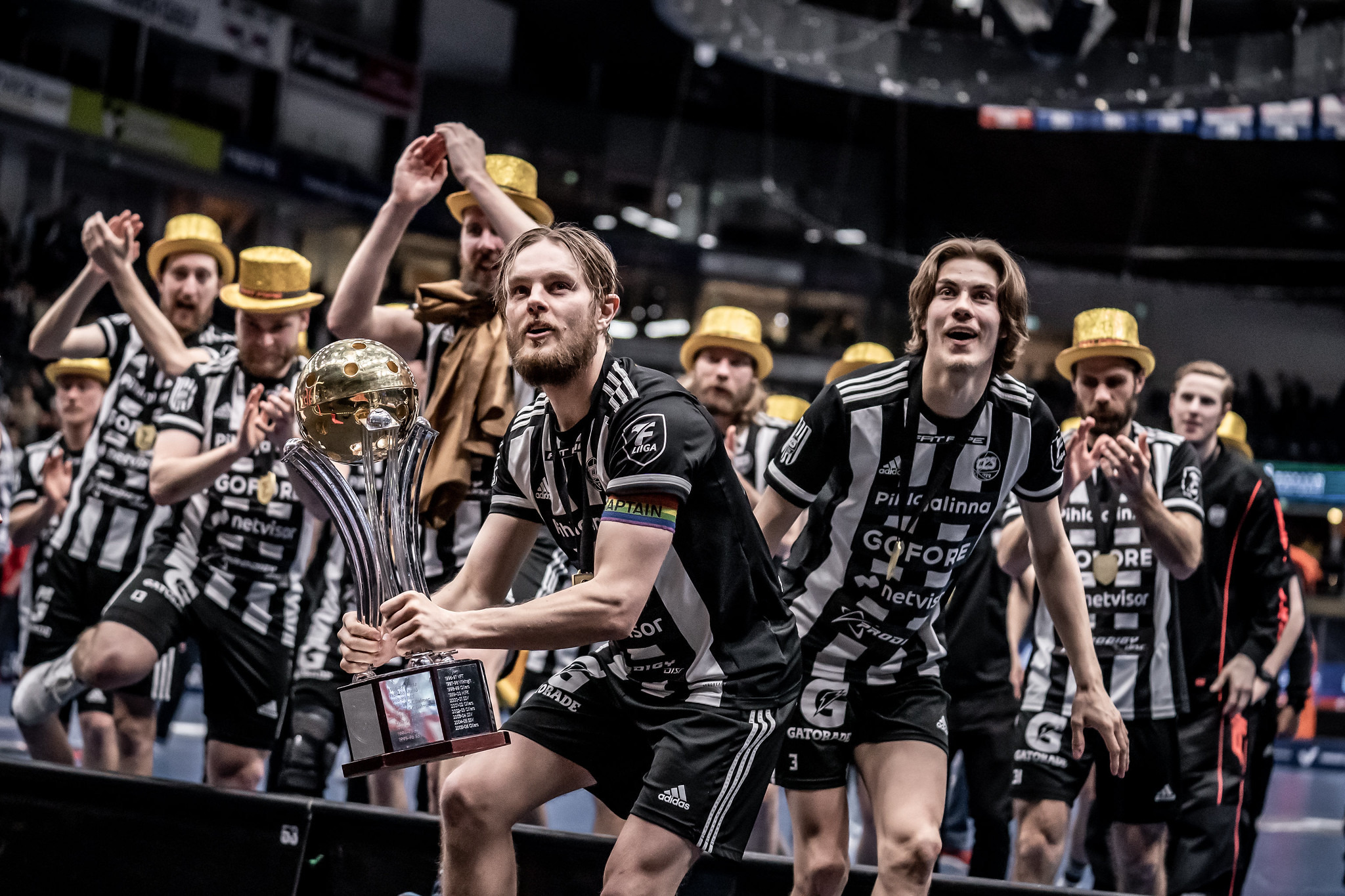
TPS players celebrate the championship title in the 2022–23 season

== Format ==
=== Regular season ===
In the regular season, which takes place approximately from September to March, all teams play each other twice, and additionally, each team plays twice against every team from one of two six-team regional groups. In total, each team plays 32 games.

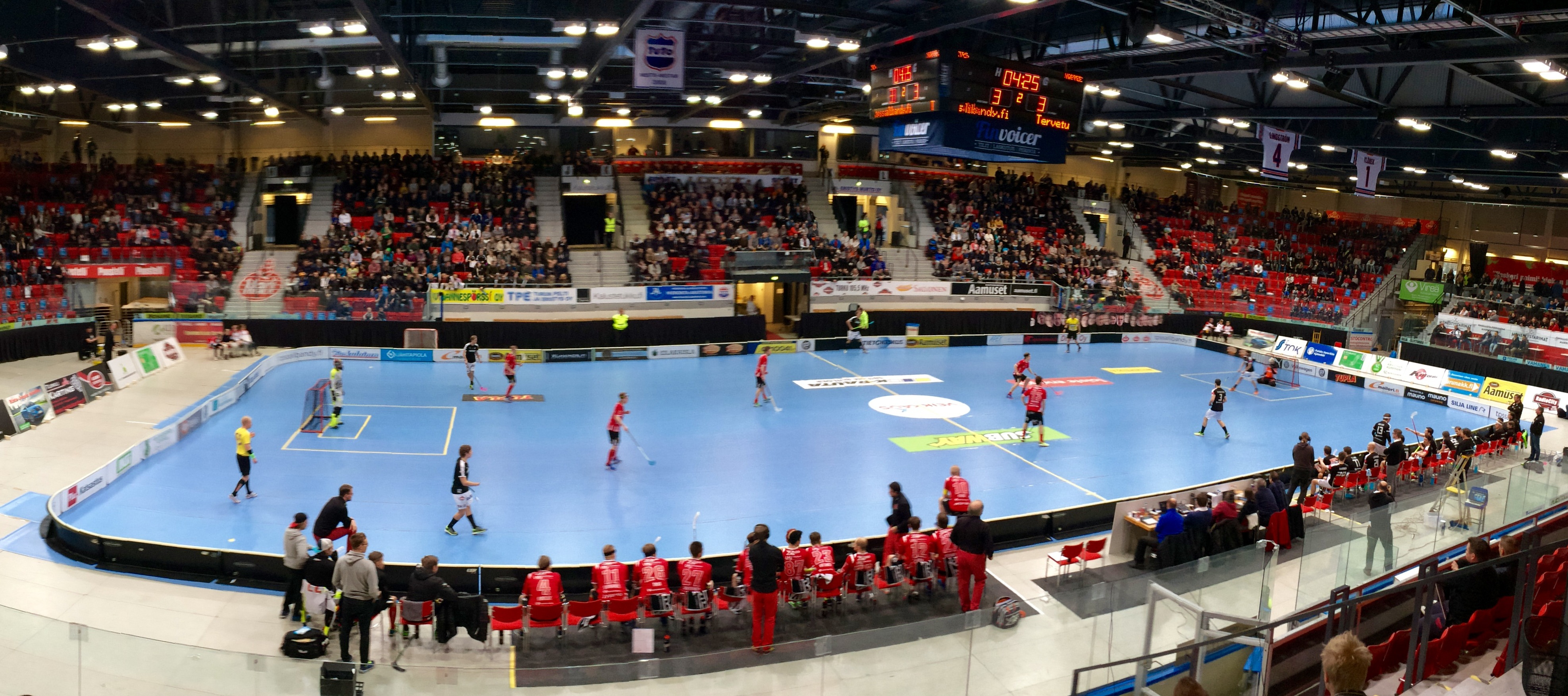
Semifinal match between TPS and Happee in the 2015–16 season.

=== Playoffs ===
The top eight teams from the regular season play for the Finnish Championship, in playoffs that starts around March and culminates in April. For quarterfinals, the top three teams from the regular season successively choose their quarterfinal opponents from the four remaining teams. The semifinal pairings are determined by the regular season standings. The playoffs are played in best-of-seven format. The losing semifinalists play a single match for the bronze medal.

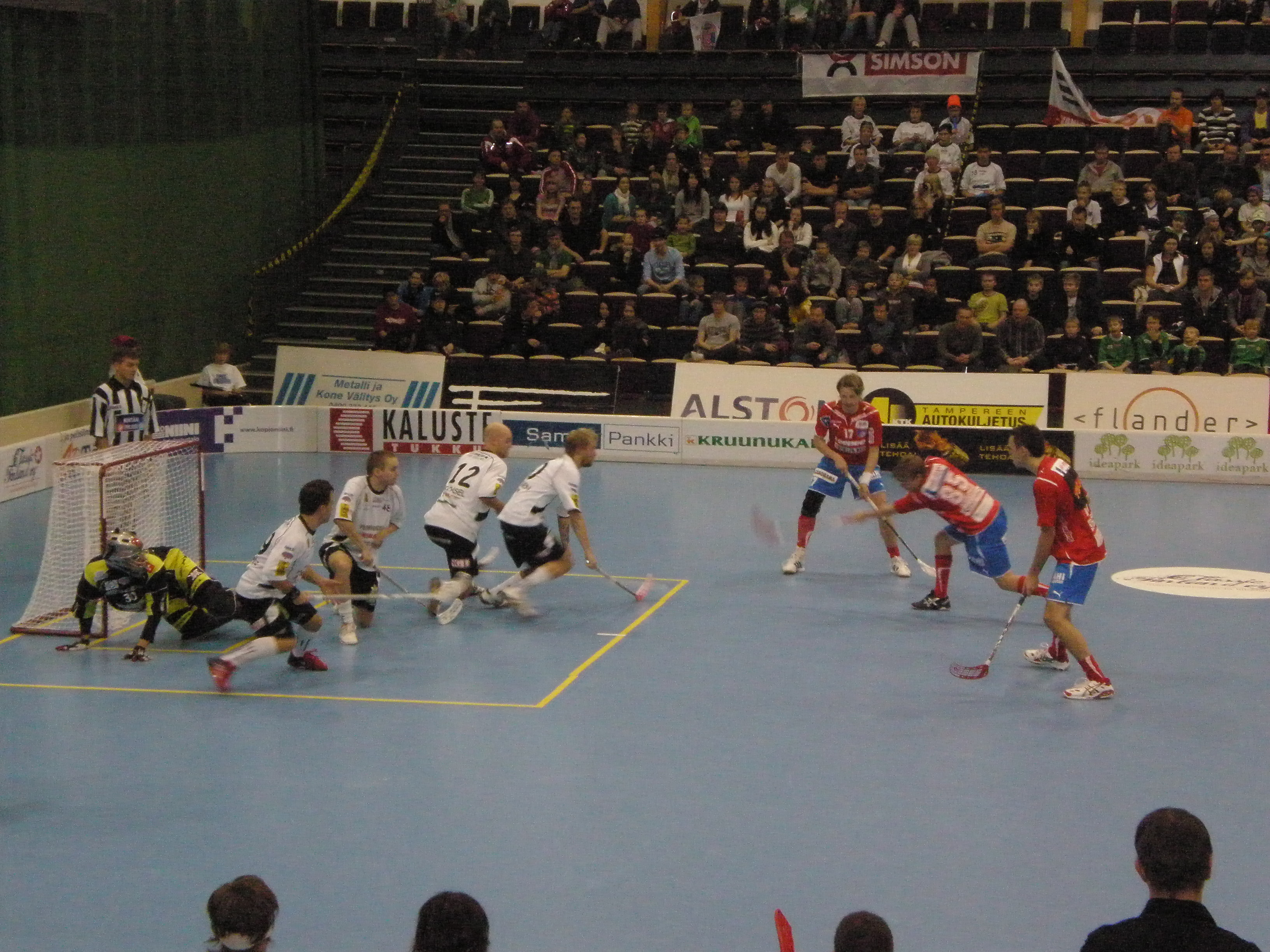
Regular season game between Classic and SPV in the 2009–10 season.

=== Playout ===
Starting with the 2025–26 season, the last-place team is automatically relegated and replaced by the winner of the lower competition final (called Division, Divari in Finnish, or Inssi-Divari for sponsorship reasons). The second-to-last team plays a relegation playoff against the runner-up of the Divari final.

== History ==
The league was founded as Salibandyn SM-sarja (English: Floorball Finnish Champions-Series) in 1986. It was renamed to Salibandyliiga for the 1994–95 season. The Salibandyliiga was operated by the company SSBL Salibandy Oy, a subsidiary of the Finnish Floorball Federation. The current name F-liiga is used since season 2020–21.

Starting with the 2015–16 season, the league adopted the Superfinal system, a single championship game to decide the title. However, after three years, it returned to a final series format.

== Current teams ==
Location of teams

Teams in 2026–27 season:

- Classic, Tampere
- EräViikingit, Helsinki
- Hawks, Helsinki
- Indians, Espoo
- Jymy, Seinäjoki
- LASB, Lahti
- Nokian KrP, Nokia
- O2-Jyväskylä, Jyväskylä
- Oilers, Espoo
- OLS, Oulu
- SPV, Seinäjoki
- TPS, Turku

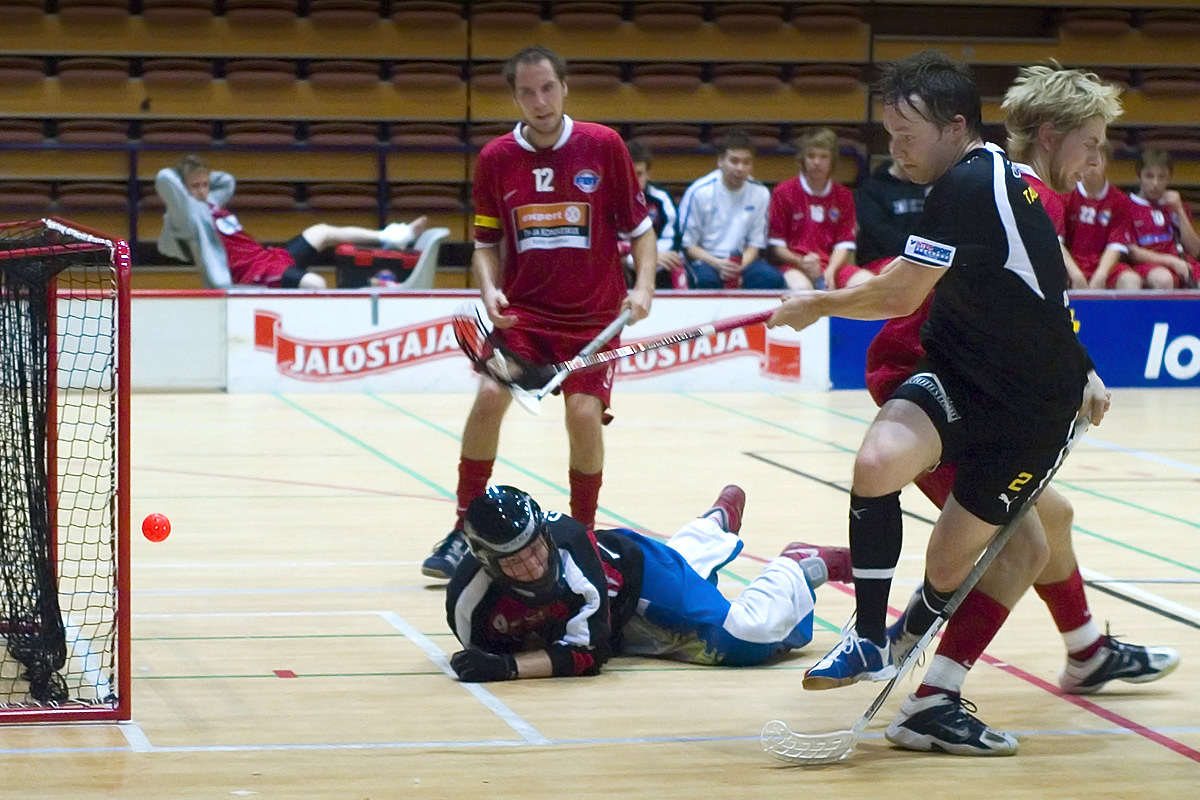
TPS come close to scoring against FBT Pori in the 2005–06 season.

== Recent medalists ==
Season	Champions	Runner-up	Third Place
2025–26	Nokian KrP	Classic	Oilers
2024–25	Oilers	Classic	Indians
2023–24	Oilers	Classic	Nokian KrP
2022–23	TPS	Nokian KrP	Oilers
2021–22	Classic	Nokian KrP	Oilers
2020–21	Classic	Oilers	Nokian KrP
2019–20	The season was cancelled due to COVID-19 pandemic		
2018–19	Classic	TPS	SPV
2017–18	Classic	Happee	Nokian KrP
2016–17	Classic	EräViikingit	SPV
2015–16	Classic	Oilers	Happee
2014–15	SPV	Happee	SSV
2013–14	Happee	Classic	SSV
2012–13	SPV	SSV	Classic
2011–12	SPV	SSV	Koovee
2010–11	SSV	SPV	Oilers
2009–10	SSV	Erä	SPV
2008–09	SSV	Erä	SPV
2007–08	SSV	Classic	Erä
2006–07	SSV	Classic	Erä
2005–06	Oilers	SSV	Josba
2004–05	SSV	Happee	Classic

== List of champions ==
Team	Titles	Seasons
SSV	11	1992–93, 1994–95, 1995–96, 2000–01, 2003–04, 2004–05, 2006–07, 2007–08, 2008–09, 2009–10, 2010–11
Oilers	6	1998–99, 2001–02, 2002–03, 2005–06, 2023–24, 2024–25
Classic	6	2015–16, 2016–17, 2017–18, 2018–19, 2020–21, 2021–22
SPV	3	2011–12, 2012–13, 2014–15
Josba Joensuu	2	1991–1992, 1993–94
SC Dalmac Helsinki	2	1989–90, 1990–91
ManU Tampere	2	1986–87, 1987–88
Nokian KrP	1	2025–26
TPS	1	2022–23
Happee Jyväskylä	1	2013–14
Viikingit Helsinki	1	1997–98
VFT Vantaa	1	1996–97
BET	1	1988–89
HIFK	1	1999–00

Updated as of season 2025–26.
