= Czech Open (floorball) =

Floorball tournament in Prague, Czech Republic

- Sport: floorball
- Founded: 1993
- Most recent champions: Men: (Sweden) IBF Falun; Women: (Sweden) Pixbo IBK (2026)
- Most titles: Men: (Sweden) Pixbo IBK (9); Women: (Sweden) Pixbo IBK (12)
- Website: https://www.czechopen.cz/

Czech Open is an international floorball tournament. It takes place every year in August in Prague, Czech Republic. It is one of the largest professional floorball tournaments in the world. Every year up to 200 teams from around the world participate. The first season was played in 1993.

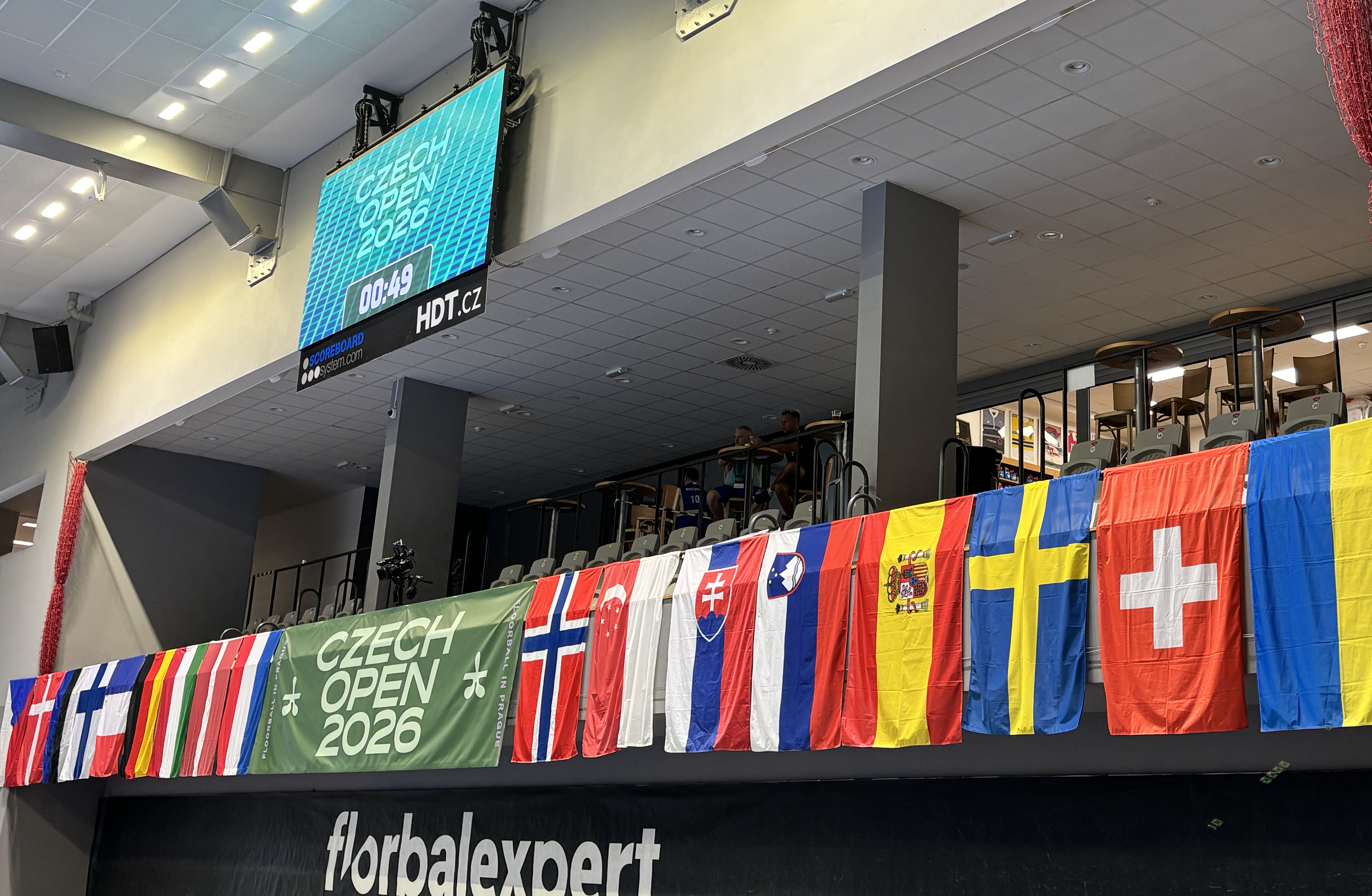
UNYP Arena during 2026 Czech Open

There are seven categories in the tournament. Both men and women have three categories (Elite, Pro and Open) and juniors have one. The elite categories are contested by eight teams each. Czech teams have a number of places reserved, which are assigned according to standings of the teams in Czech floorball leagues (such as Superliga florbalu or Extraliga žen).

The most successful team in the history of the tournament is Swedish Pixbo IBK, with nine titles in men's and twelve in women's Elite categories. By 2026, the men Elite category has been won only by three teams from the Czech Republic – 1. SC Vítkovice, Tatran Střešovice and FBC Ostrava. They won in 1998, 1999, 2020, 2021, 2022 and 2024. With an exception of Tatran wins in 2022 and 2024, those were years, when the strong Scandinavian teams did not arrive. Women Elite has also only three Czech winners – Děkanka (2006 through 2010, 2012), Tatran (1997, 2004) and Vítkovice (2020, 2021).

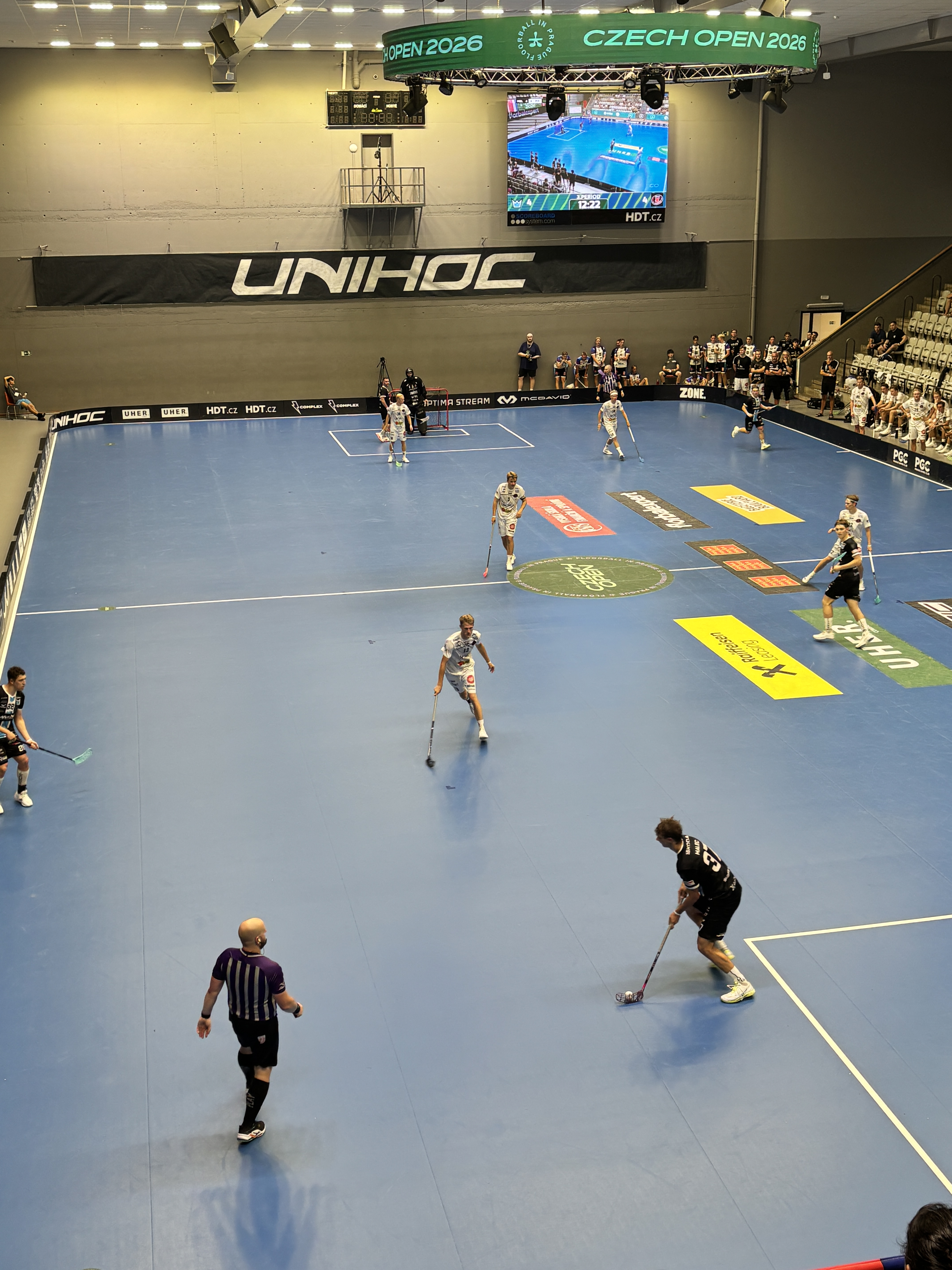
Florbal MB vs Pixbo IBK match in 2026

The tournament is co-organized by the Prague club Tatran Střešovice for adult and junior teams. For younger age groups, the related Prague Games tournament has been held in July since 2004, while the Prague Masters for veterans has been held in November since 2006. Starting in 2025, the EuroFloorball Cup (a lower tier of the Champions Cup) is hosted as part of the Czech Open, with the EuroFloorball Challenge (the third tier) also included as of 2026.

== List of Elite Czech Open winners ==
| Year | Men's Elite | Women's Elite |
|---|---|---|
| 2026 | (Sweden) IBF Falun | (Sweden) Pixbo IBK |
| 2025 | (Sweden) IBF Falun | (Sweden) Pixbo IBK |
| 2024 | (Czech Republic) ESA logistika Tatran Střešovice | (Sweden) Pixbo IBK |
| 2023 | (Sweden) Pixbo IBK | (Sweden) Pixbo IBK |
| 2022 | (Czech Republic) Tatran Střešovice | (Sweden) Pixbo Wallenstam IBK |
| 2021 | (Czech Republic) Tatran Střešovice | (Czech Republic) 1. SC TEMPISH Vítkovice |
| 2020 | (Czech Republic) 1. SC TEMPISH Vítkovice | (Czech Republic) 1. SC TEMPISH Vítkovice |
| 2019 | (Sweden) IBF Falun | (Sweden) Pixbo Wallenstam IBK |
| 2018 | (Sweden) IBF Falun | (Sweden) Pixbo Wallenstam IBK |
| 2017 | (Sweden) IBF Falun | (Sweden) Pixbo Wallenstam IBK |
| 2016 | (Finland) EräViikingit | (Sweden) Pixbo Wallenstam IBK |
| 2015 | (Sweden) Pixbo Wallenstam IBK | (Finland) SB-Pro |
| 2014 | (Sweden) IBF Falun | (Sweden) Pixbo Wallenstam IBK |
| 2013 | (Sweden) IBK Dalen | (Sweden) Pixbo Wallenstam IBK |
| 2012 | (Sweden) Pixbo Wallenstam IBK | (Czech Republic) Herbadent SJM Praha 11 |
| 2011 | (Sweden) IBK Dalen | (Sweden) Pixbo Wallenstam IBK |
| 2010 | (Sweden) Pixbo Wallenstam IBK | (Czech Republic) Herbadent SJM |
| 2009 | (Sweden) IBK Dalen | (Czech Republic) Herbadent Tigers SJM |
| 2008 | (Sweden) Sirius IBK | (Czech Republic) Děkanka Tigers |
| 2007 | (Finland) SSV Helsinki | (Czech Republic) Děkanka Tigers |
| 2006 | (Sweden) Pixbo Wallenstam IBK | (Czech Republic) Triggers |
| 2005 | (Sweden) IBK Dalen | (Finland) Galna Finnar |
| 2004 | (Sweden) Balrog Oilers | (Czech Republic) Tatran Střešovice |
| 2003 | (Sweden) Pixbo Wallenstam IBK | (Sweden) Balrog Oilers |
| 2002 | (Sweden) Pixbo Wallenstam IBK | (Sweden) Husqvarma IK |
| 2001 | (Sweden) Pixbo Wallenstam IBK | (Switzerland) UHC Bern OST |
| 2000 | (Finland) Helsinginfors IFK | (Finland) SSV Helsinki |
| 1999 | (Czech Republic) Tatran Střešovice | (Russia) Nizhny Novgorod |
| 1998 | (Czech Republic) FBC Ostrava | (Switzerland) Jona-Uznach Flames |
| 1997 | (Sweden) Fornudden IB | (Czech Republic) Tatran Střešovice |
| 1996 | (Sweden) Pixbo Wallenstam IBK | (Switzerland) RA Rychenberg |
| 1995 | (Sweden) Fornudden IB | (Switzerland) RA Rychenberg |
| 1994 | (Sweden) Sjöstads IF | (Sweden) Sjöstads IF |
| 1993 | (Sweden) IKSU innebandy | (Sweden) Kristineberg AIS |

== List of winners in other categories ==
| Year | Men's Intermediate | Women's Intermediate | Junior |
|---|---|---|---|
| 2026 | (Czech Republic) BA Sokoli Pardubice | (Czech Republic) FbŠ Bohemians | (Switzerland) EFS United |
| 2025 | (Czech Republic) Kanonýři Kladno | (Czech Republic) Bulldogs Brno | (Czech Republic) Tatran Střešovice |
| 2024 | (Czech Republic) Florbal Vary | (Czech Republic) Crazy Girls FBC Liberec | (Switzerland) SV Wiler-Ersigen |
| 2023 | (Sweden) RIG Umeå IBF | (Czech Republic) Crazy Girls FBC Liberec | (Czech Republic) FAT PIPE Florbal Chodov |
| 2022 | (Sweden) RIG Umeå IBF | (Czech Republic) TJ Sokol Královské Vinohrady | (Czech Republic) Tatran Střešovice |
| 2021 | (Czech Republic) FB Hurrican Karlovy Vary | (Czech Republic) FbŠ Bohemians B | |
| 2020 | (Czech Republic) ASK Orka Čelákovice | (Czech Republic) TJ Sokol Královské Vinohrady | |
| 2019 | (Czech Republic) Black Angels | (Finland) SB Limits | (Switzerland) SV Wiler-Ersigen |
| 2018 | (Czech Republic) Sokol Pardubice | (Czech Republic) FbŠ Bohemians | |
| 2017 | (Sweden) RIG Umeå IBF | (Czech Republic) Panthers Praha | |
| 2016 | (Switzerland) Floorball Thurgau | (Czech Republic) Tatran Střešovice | (Czech Republic) itelligence Bulldogs Brno |
| 2015 | (Czech Republic) Sokol Pardubice | (Sweden) Hagfors IF Ungdom | (Czech Republic) Technology Florbal MB |
| 2014 | (Czech Republic) 1. MVIL Ostrava | (Sweden) KAIS Mora UIF | (Czech Republic) FBC ČPP Bystroň Group Ostrava |
| 2013 | (Czech Republic) TJ Sokol Královské Vinohrady | (Sweden) KAIS Mora UIF | (Czech Republic) FBC ČPP Software Ostrava |
| 2012 | (Sweden) RIG Umeå IBF yellow | (Czech Republic) Elite Praha | (Czech Republic) BILLY BOY Mladá Boleslav |
| 2011 | (Czech Republic) AC Sparta Praha | (Czech Republic) Chuchichäschtli | (Czech Republic) FBC ČPP Remedicum Ostrava |
| 2010 | (Czech Republic) Tatran Střešovice | (Finland) Cerna Hora | (Czech Republic) x3m team SSK Future |
| 2009 | (Finland) SBS Kings | (Finland) Cerna Hora | (Czech Republic) x3m team SSK Future |
| 2008 | (Finland) Höpöhöpö | (Czech Republic) Elite Praha | (Czech Republic) SSK Future |
| 2007 | (Czech Republic) Sokol Pardubice | (Norway) Sagene Ladies | (Czech Republic) FBC Pepino Ostrava |
| 2006 | (Czech Republic) FBC Liberec | (Norway) Sagene Ladies | (Czech Republic) Tatran Střešovice |
| 2005 | (Latvia) CelTik / Lekrings | (Finland) Koo-Vee | (Czech Republic) SSK Future |
| 2004 | (Latvia) Rubene | | (Finland) Tapanilan Erä |
| 2003 | (Finland) FB Topgrandma | | (Czech Republic) SSK Future |
| 2002 | (Sweden) Röke IBK | | (Czech Republic) SSK Future |
| 2001 | (Czech Republic) SSK Future | | (Sweden) Frosta IBF |
| 2000 | (Sweden) Röke IBK | | (Czech Republic) SSK Future |
| 1999 | (Finland) Kirkkonummi Rangers | | (Russia) Nizhny Novgorod |
| 1998 | (Switzerland) Team 88 Konolfingen | | (Sweden) Storvreta IBK |
| 1997 | (Sweden) IBK Succe | | (Sweden) Baldersnas IK |
| 1996 | (Finland) Kirkkonummi Rangers | | |
| 1995 | (Finland) Challengers-93 | | |
