= Swedish Super League (women's floorball) =

Swedish women's floorball top division

- Formerly: Elitserien (1997–2012)
- Sport: Floorball
- Founded: 1997
- No. of teams: 14
- Country: Sweden
- Most recent champion: Team Thorengruppen (2026, 6th title)
- Most titles: IKSU (7 titles)
- International cup: Champions Cup
- Website: ssl.se

Swedish Super League (SSL, Swedish: Svenska Superligan; formerly named Elitserien) is the highest league in the league system of Swedish women's floorball and comprises the top 14 Swedish floorball teams.

The champion of the league is eligible to compete at the Champions Cup.

The current six-time champion, as of the 2025–26 season, is Team Thorengruppen, the successor to IKSU, the most successful club in the league's history.

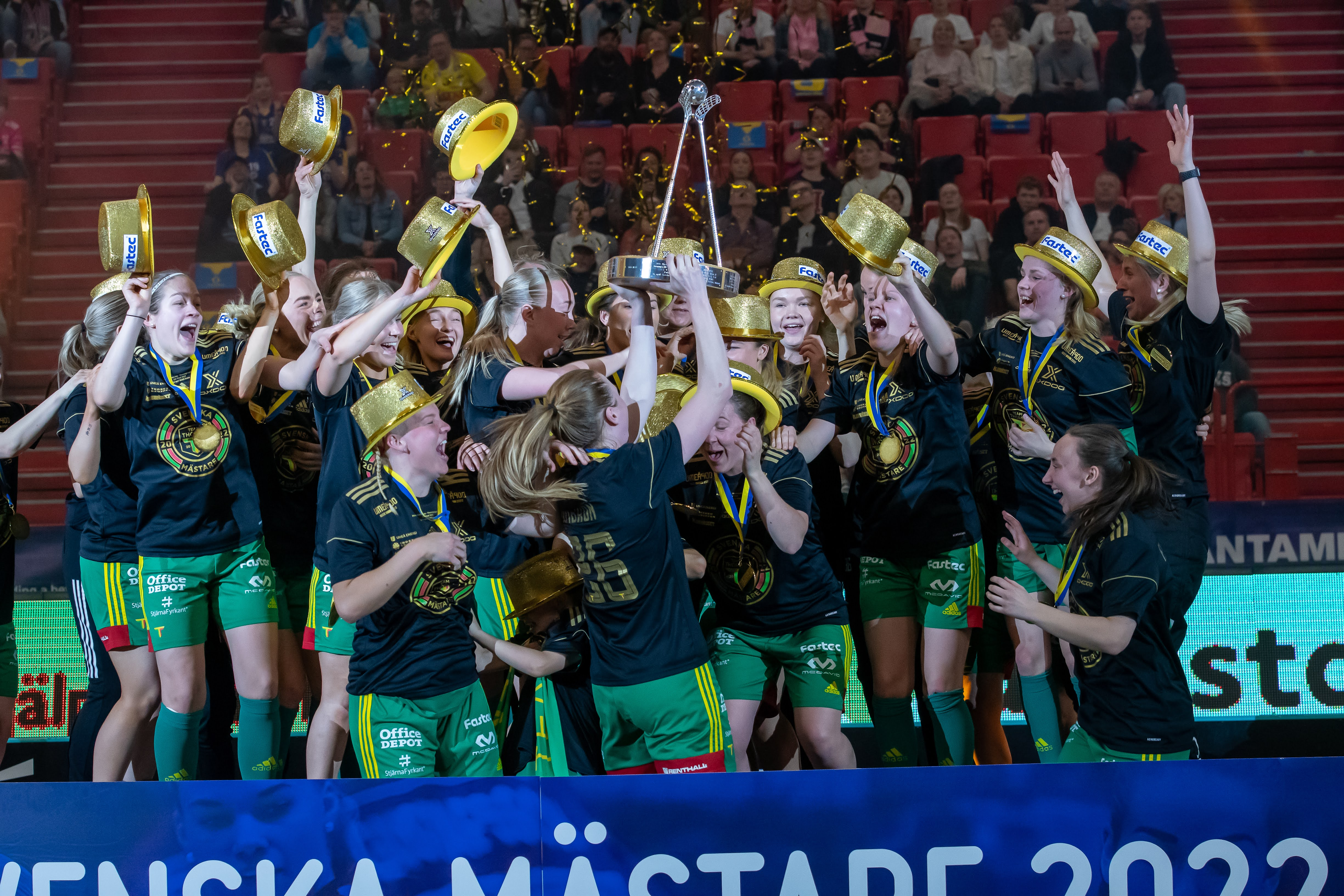
Team Thorengruppen celebrates victory in the 2021–22 Swedish Super League final.

== History ==
The Swedish Super League was preceded by the Swedish Cup (Svenska cupen), held from 1982 to 1993, which was the world's first floorball competition. It was followed by the Division 1 league, played from 1993.

In 1997, the Elitserien league was established, which was divided into northern and southern groups until the 2005/2006 season. Starting from the 2006/2007 season, the competition became a national league. Before the 2012/2013 season, the name was changed from Elitserien to the Swedish Super League.

== Season structure ==
The season starts with a regular season with 26 games per team, one home and one away against all teams. In the spring a play-off starts with the eight best teams from the regular season. The quarterfinals as well as the semifinals are played in best of five matches, the final is settled in just one. The final is played in Stockholm Globe Arena together with the men's Swedish Super League final. The bottom two teams are relegated to the lower division, Allsvenskan.

== Current clubs ==
Location of teams

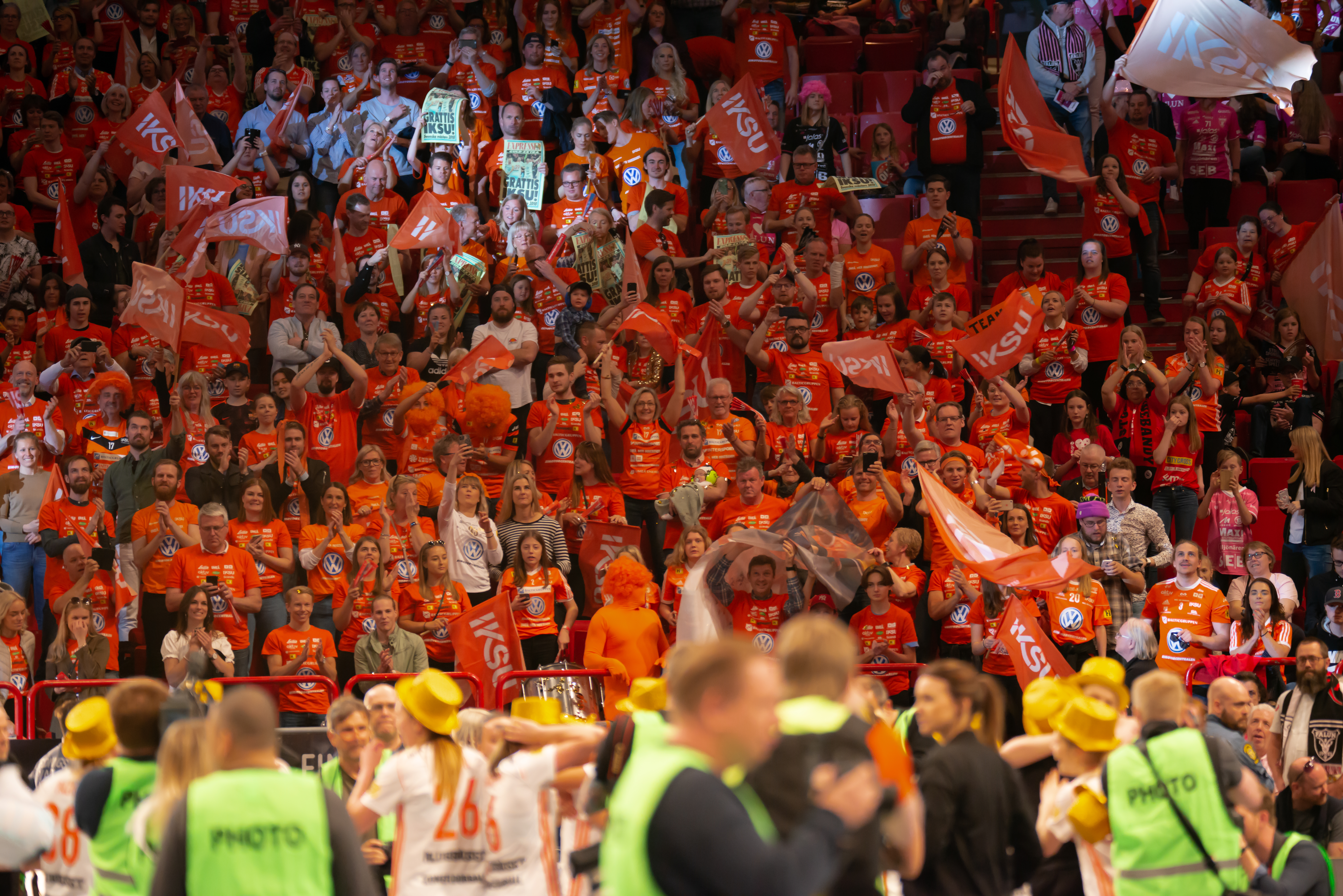
IKSU fans at the 2017–18 final.

SSL clubs in season 2025–26:

- Endre IF (Visby)
- FBC Kalmarsund (Kalmar)
- FBC Partille (Partille)
- IBK Dalen (Umeå)
- IBK Lund (Lund)
- Karlstad IBF (Karlstad)
- Malmö FBC (Malmö)
- Pixbo IBK (Mölnlycke)
- Storvreta IBK
- Täby FC (Stockholm)
- Team Thorengruppen (Umeå)
- Västerås Rönnby IBK (Västerås)
- Växjö Vipers
- Warberg IC (Varberg)

== Previous finalists ==
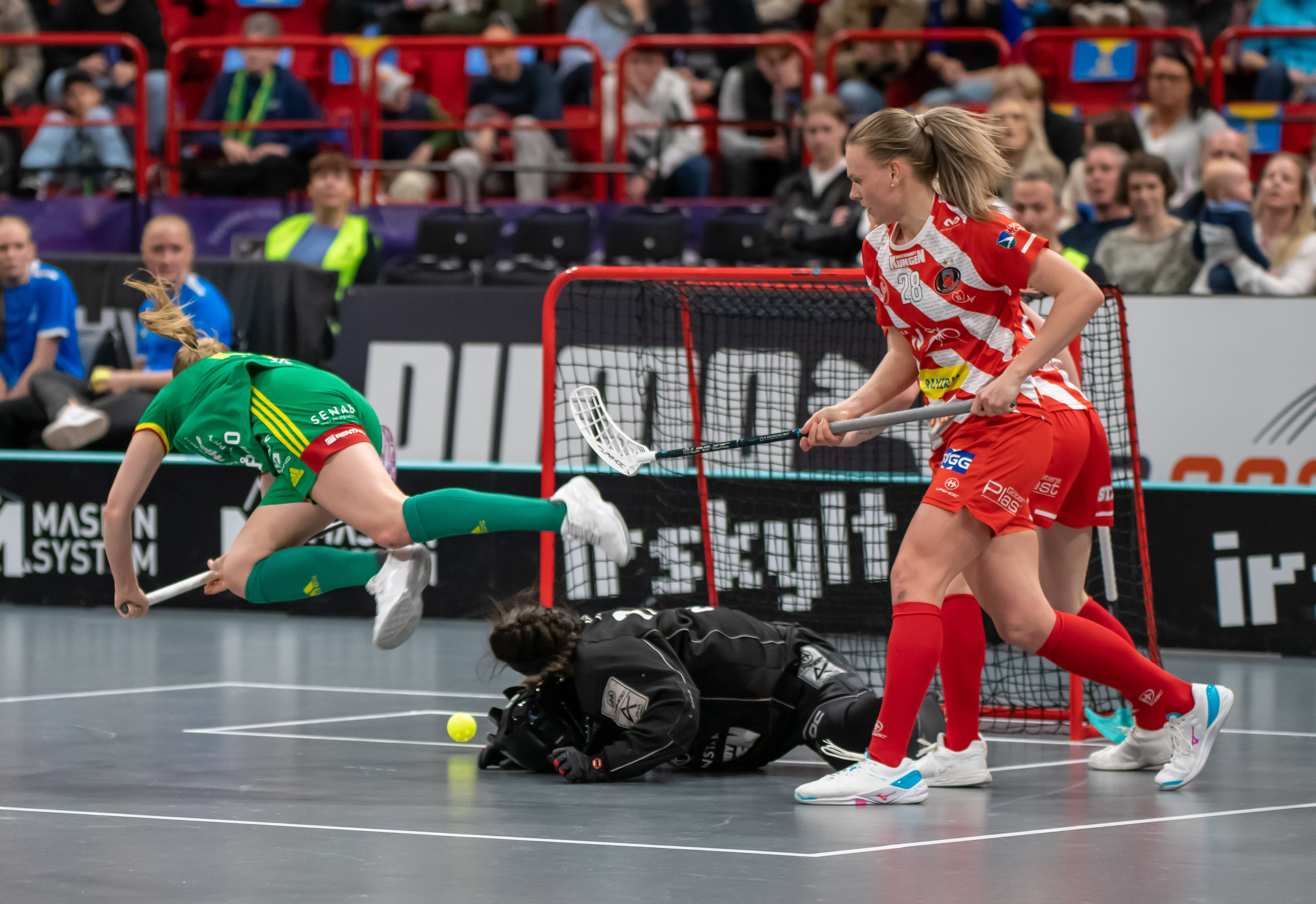
2021–22 Swedish Super League final between Team Thorengruppen and Pixbo IBK.

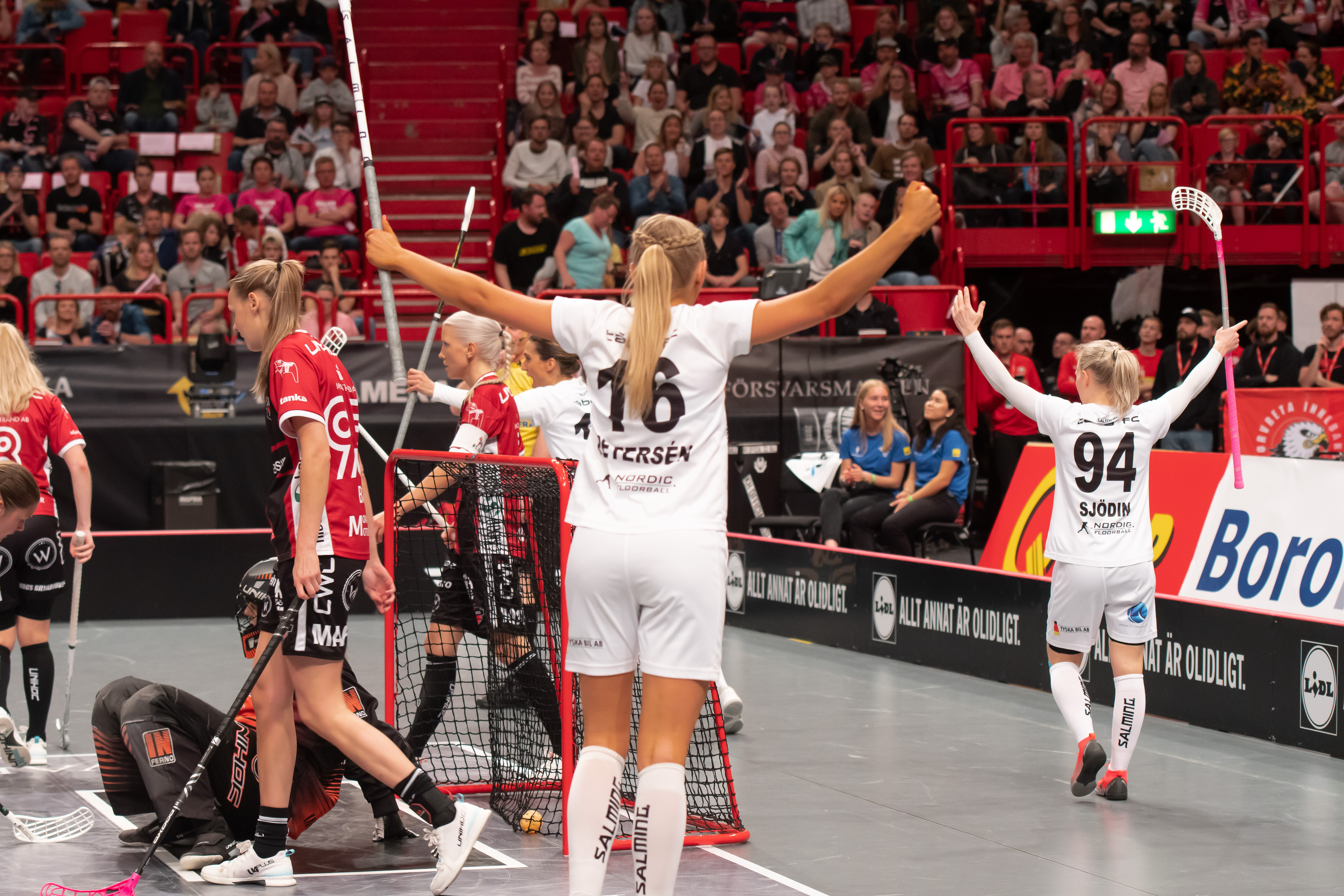
Players of KAIS Mora IF and Täby FC in the 2018–19 final.

Season	Champions	Runner-up
1998	Högdalens AIS	IBF Falun
1999	Högdalens AIS	IBF Falun
2000	Balrog IK	Södertälje IBK
2001	Balrog IK	IBF Falun
2002	Balrog IK	Örnsköldsviks SK
2003	Balrog IK	Södertälje IBK
2004	Örnsköldsviks SK	Södertälje IBK
2005	IKSU	Pixbo IBK
2006	IKSU	Rönnby IBK
2007	Rönnby IBK	IKSU
2008	IKSU	Balrog B/S IK
2009	Balrog IK	IBF Falun
2010	Rönnby IBK	IKSU
2011	Djurgårdens IF	IKSU
2012	IKSU	KAIS Mora IF
2013	Rönnby IBK	IKSU
2014	Djurgårdens IF	KAIS Mora IF
2015	KAIS Mora IF	Rönnby IBK
2016	Pixbo IBK	KAIS Mora IF
2017	IKSU	KAIS Mora IF
2018	IKSU	KAIS Mora IF
2019	Täby FC	KAIS Mora IF
2020	IKSU	Pixbo IBK
2021	Team Thorengruppen	Pixbo IBK
2022	Team Thorengruppen	Pixbo IBK
2023	Team Thorengruppen	Pixbo IBK
2024	Team Thorengruppen	Pixbo IBK
2025	Team Thorengruppen	Pixbo IBK
2026	Team Thorengruppen	FBC Kalmarsund

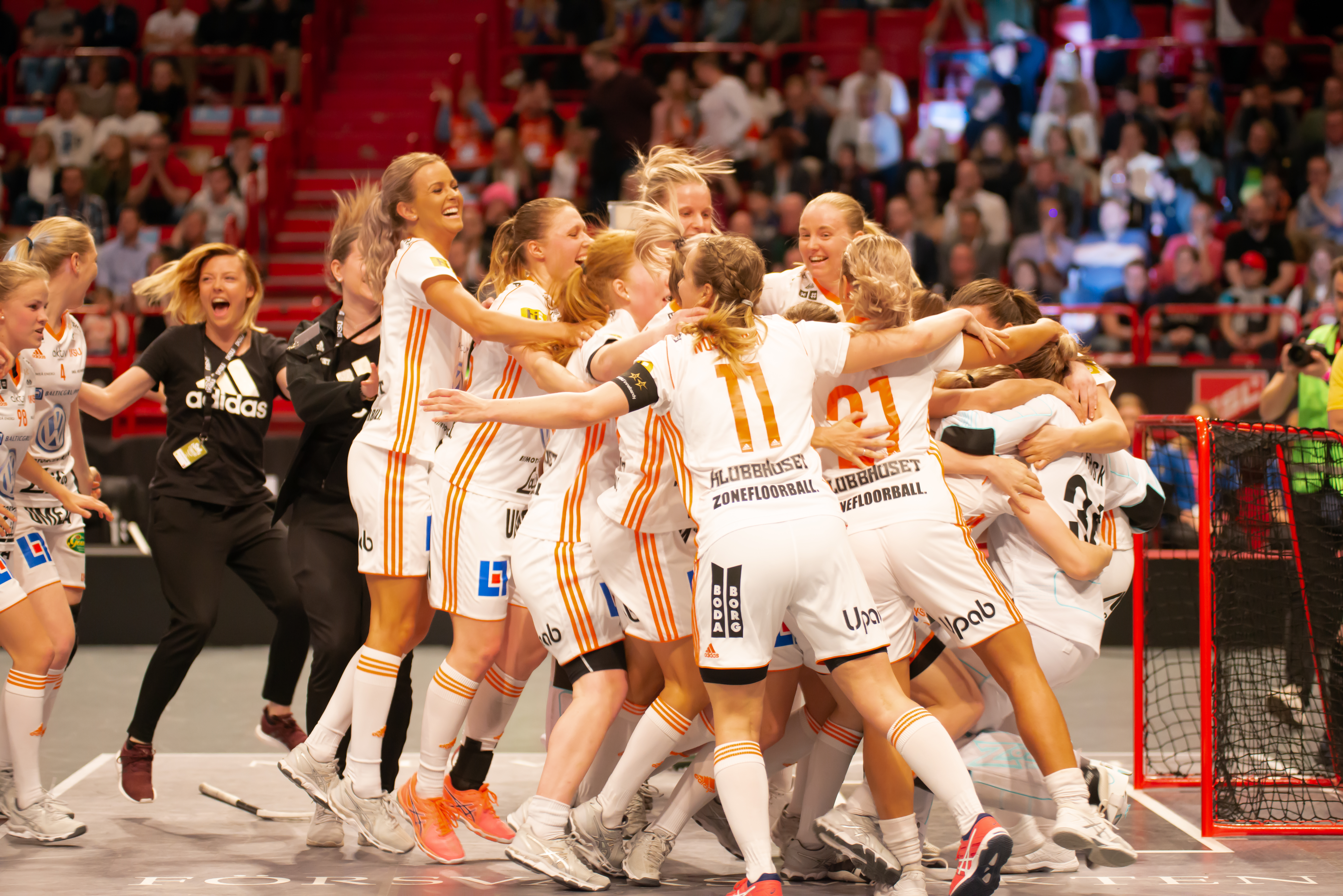
IKSU players celebrating in the 2017–18 final.

== List of champions ==
Team	Titles	Last
IKSU	7	2019–20
Team Thorengruppen	6	2025–26
Balrog IK	5	2008–09
Rönnby IBK	3	2012–13
Djurgårdens IF	2	2013–14
Högdalens AIS	2	1998–99
Täby FC	1	2018–19
Pixbo IBK	1	2015–16
KAIS Mora IF	1	2014–15
Örnsköldsviks SK	1	2003–04
