= IBF NB 87 =

Former floorball club in Karlstad, Sweden

- Full name: Innebandyföreningen Norrstrand Bengen 87
- Short name: NB8 87
- Founded: 1987
- Dissolved: 2001
- Arena: Sundsta sporthall

IBF NB 87 was a floorball club in Karlstad, Sweden, established as a merger out of the Norrstands IF and Bengens IBF floorball sections in 1987. before merging with Sjöstads IF in 2001, establishing Karlstads IBF.

The men's team played the 1996 Swedish national championship finals, losing to Balrog IK.
