= Czech Open =

Czech Open is a name given to many sports events in the Czech Republic, including:

- Czech International, a badminton tournament now known as the Czech Open
- Czech Open (darts), a BDO sanctioned darts tournament
- Czech Open (floorball), a floorball tournament
- Czech Open (golf), a European Tour golf tournament
- Czech Open (tennis), an ATP Challenger Tour tennis tournament
- Prague Open (1987–1999), an ATP Challenger Tour tennis tournament
- I.ČLTK Prague Open, an ATP Challenger Tour and WTA International Tournaments tennis tournament
