= Guldstaden IB =

Floorball club in Skellefteå, Sweden

- Full name: Guldstaden innebandy
- Short name: GIB

Guldstaden IB was a floorball club in Skellefteå, Sweden. The men's team played 9 seasons in the Swedish top division, starting in 1989/1990. During the 1991/1992 season the team reached the Swedish national championship quarterfinals, losing to IBK Lockerud, and the upcoming season the same thing happened again, but against Balrog IK.
