= Uppsala City IBK =

Former floorball club in Uppsala, Sweden

- Full name: Uppsala City innebandyklubb
- Short name: UCIBK
- Arena: Fyrishov

Uppsala City IBK was a floorball club in Uppsala, Sweden. The men's team played in the Swedish top division during the 1990s. During the same decade, the women's team took over Storvreta IBK's place in the Swedish league system. The women's team's played successful during Swedish championship playoffs during the 1996–1997 season, winning the first semifinal game against Högdalens IBF, even if they lost the semifinal series totally counted.
