= 2023–24 Men's Floorball Champions Cup =

European floorball tournament

Men's Floorball Champions Cup
- 2023–24

Tournament information
- Sport: Floorball
- Dates: 19 August 2023–27 January 2024
- Teams: 8
- Website: Floorball Champions Cup

Final positions
- Champions: (Czech Republic) Tatran Střešovice (1st title)
- Runner-up: (Sweden) IBF Falun

Tournament statistics
- Matches played: 13
- Goals scored: 120 (9.23 per match)
- Attendance: 12,512 (962 per match)

The 2023–24 Men's Floorball Champions Cup was the 29th edition of the premier competition for floorball clubs and the first in a new format for league and cup winners. The reigning champions were IBF Falun. Tatran Střešovice became the first Czech team to win the cup by beating Falun 6–4 in Prague.

== Format ==
The format had undergone a new format in the season with the inclusion of the cup winners from all four countries. If the same team wins the league and the cup in their country, the second-place team in the league also takes part.

For quarterfinals the eight teams are divided into two conferences based on their geographical location. The Swedish and Finnish teams take part in the Northern conference; the clubs from the Czech Republic and Switzerland play in the Southern conference. The four winners advance to the semifinals. Quarterfinals and semifinals are played in a home and away format. If a round is undecided after the two matches, the second match is followed by an overtime. The two semifinal winners play in a final held at a centralized venue.

== Teams ==
Conference	Country (League)	League Winner	Cup Winner
Northern	Sweden (Swedish Super League)	Storvreta IBK	IBF Falun
Northern	Finland (F-liiga)	TPS	Classic
Southern	Czech Republic (Livesport Superliga)	Tatran Střešovice	FbŠ Bohemians Praha
Southern	Switzerland (Unihockey Prime League)	SV Wiler-Ersigen	Floorball Köniz Bern

Location of teams of the 2023–24 Floorball Champions Cup.

== Tournament ==
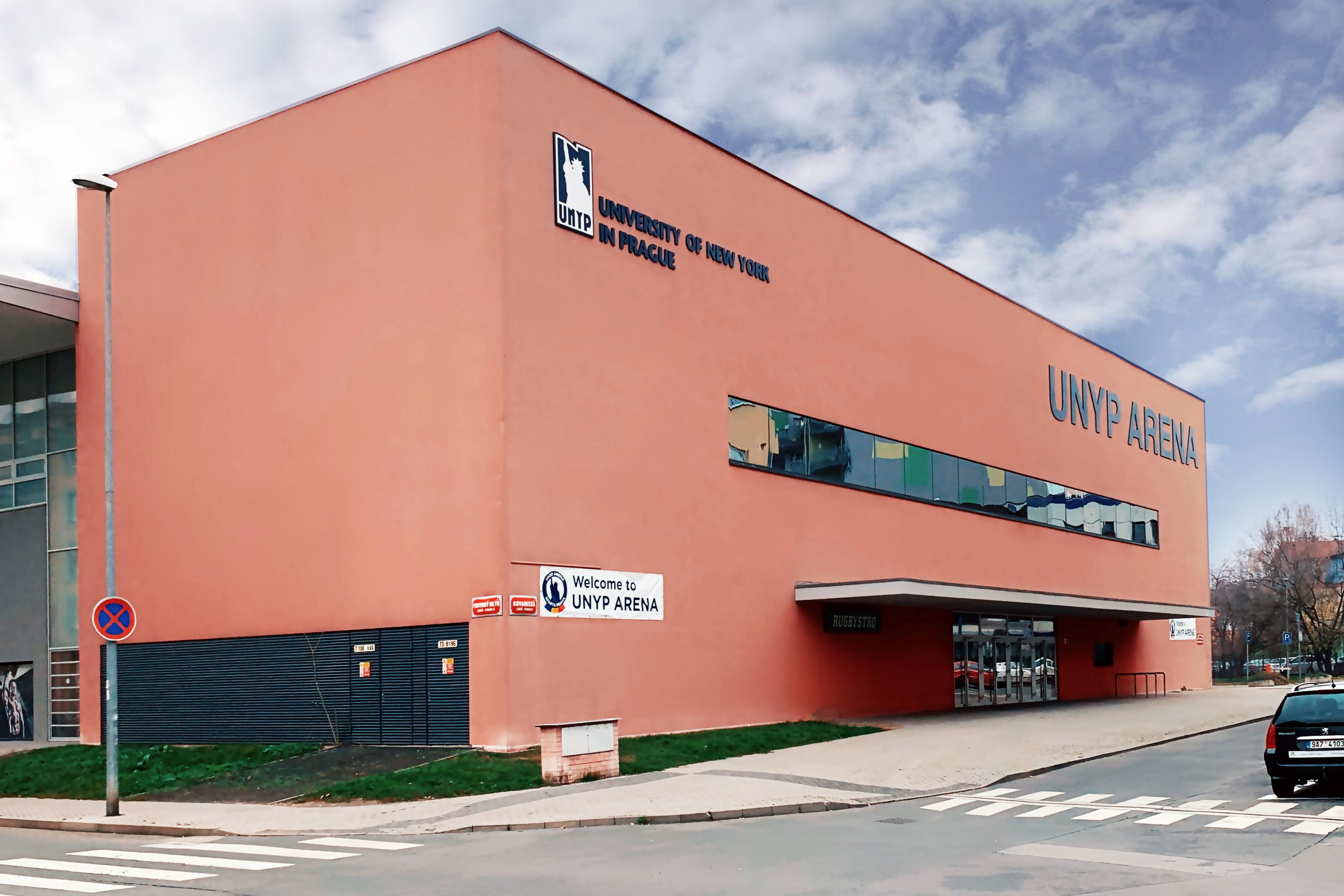
The final was held at the UNYP Arena in Prague.

The Northern Conference's quarterfinals was played on 26 and 27 August 2023, and the Southern Conference's was played on 16 and 23 September. The draw for the semifinals took place on 25 September. The first leg of the semifinals was played on 22 and 26 November, while the second leg was played on 29 November and 2 December. The finals took place on 27 January 2024 at the UNYP Arena in Prague.

=== Bracket ===
Quarterfinals
(Finland) TPS	5	4	0
(Sweden) IBF Falun	12	6	2
(Sweden) Storvreta IBK	1	7	1 OT
(Finland) Classic	2	5	1
(Czech Republic) Tatran Střešovice	5	10	2
(Switzerland) Floorball Köniz Bern	2	2	0
(Switzerland) SV Wiler-Ersigen	4	6	1 OT
(Czech Republic) FbŠ Bohemians Praha	5	3	1

Semifinals
(Sweden) IBF Falun	5	4	0 (2)
(Sweden) Storvreta IBK	5	4	0 (0)
(Czech Republic) Tatran Střešovice	3	3	0 OT
(Switzerland) SV Wiler-Ersigen	3	3	0

Final
27 January – UNYP Arena
(Sweden) IBF Falun	4
(Czech Republic) Tatran Střešovice	6

All times are local – CET/CEST, unless stated otherwise.

=== Quarterfinals ===
19 August 2023; 15:00 EEST	Classic (Finland)	2–1 (0–0, 1–1, 1–0)	(Sweden) Storvreta IBK	Bläk Boks, Lempäälä; Attendance: 605

Report

26 August 2023; 16:00	Storvreta IBK (Sweden)	6–5 (1–0, 0–4, 5–1)	(Finland) Classic	IFU Arena, Uppsala; Attendance: 1,220

Report

1–1 in the series, Storvreta IBK won in Overtime.

19 August 2023; 13:00	IBF Falun (Sweden)	12–5 (2–1, 6–2, 4–2)	(Finland) TPS	Guide Arena, Falun; Attendance: 537

Report

27 August 2023; 15:00 EEST	TPS (Finland)	4–6 (3–2, 1–1, 0–3)	(Sweden) IBF Falun	Kupittaan Palloiluhalli, Turku; Attendance: 417

Report

IBF Falun won the series 2–0.

13 September 2023; 19:00	FbŠ Bohemians Praha (Czech Republic)	5–4 (3–1, 1–3, 1–0)	(Switzerland) SV Wiler-Ersigen	UNYP Arena, Prague; Attendance: 843

Report

16 September 2023; 19:30	SV Wiler-Ersigen (Switzerland)	5–3 (1–1, 1–2, 3–0)	(Czech Republic) FbŠ Bohemians Praha	Mobiliar Arena, Gümligen; Attendance: 987

Report

1–1 in the series, SV Wiler-Ersigen won in Overtime.

16 September 2023; 16:00	Floorball Köniz Bern (Switzerland)	2–5 (1–1, 1–1, 0–3)	(Czech Republic) Tatran Střešovice	Mobiliar Arena, Gümligen; Attendance: 861

Report

23 September 2023; 18:00	Tatran Střešovice (Czech Republic)	10–2 (2–0, 2–1, 6–1)	(Switzerland) Floorball Köniz Bern	SC Řepy, Prague; Attendance: 572

Report

Tatran Střešovice won the series 2–0.

=== Semifinals ===
22 November 2023; 18:30	Storvreta IBK (Sweden)	5–5 (0–3, 4–1, 1–1)	(Sweden) IBF Falun	IFU Arena, Uppsala; Attendance: 1,013

Report

29 November 2023; 19:00	IBF Falun (Sweden)	4–4 (1–0, 1–3, 2–1)	(Sweden) Storvreta IBK	Guide Arena, Falun; Attendance: 2,168

Report

After two draws, IBF Falun advanced after winning the penalty shootout 2–0.

26 November 2023; 18:00	SV Wiler-Ersigen (Switzerland)	3–3 (0–0, 1–1, 2–2)	(Czech Republic) Tatran Střešovice	Arena Grossmatt, Kirchberg; Attendance: 965

Report

2 December 2023; 17:00	Tatran Střešovice (Czech Republic)	3–3 (3–2, 0–1, 0–0)	(Switzerland) SV Wiler-Ersigen	SC Řepy, Prague; Attendance: 873

Report

After two draws, Tatran Střešovice won in Overtime.

=== Final ===
27 January 2024; 18:00	IBF Falun (Sweden)	4–6 (2–1, 0–1, 2–4)	(Czech Republic) Tatran Střešovice	UNYP Arena, Prague; Attendance: 1,450

Report

2023–24 Men's Floorball Champions Cup Champions

Tatran Střešovice
First title

== See also ==
- 2023–24 Women's Floorball Champions Cup
