= FBC Kalmarsund =

- Short name: FBCK
- Founded: 2011
- Arena: Färjehallen
- League: Men: Swedish Super League; Women: Swedish Super League

FBC Kalmarsund is a Swedish floorball club. It was founded in 2011 through a merger of Färjestadens IBK (established in 1990) and Calmare Lindsdal 98. The club is based in the cities of Kalmar and Färjestaden.

Kalmarsund players in the Swedish Super League final in 2022

Since the 2018–19 season, the men's team has played in the top-tier competition, the Swedish Super League. Färjestadens IBK had previously played in the Super League for a single season in 2007–08, but failed to avoid relegation. The men achieved their greatest success in the 2021–22 season, when they finished as runners-up. A year later, they also won silver in the Swedish Cup.

Kalmarsund fans in 2022

Since the 2022–23 season, the women's team has also played in the top-tier competition, the Swedish Super League. They had previously played in it for one season in 2016–17. The women achieved their greatest success in the 2025–26 season, when they finished as runners-up. A year earlier, they also won silver in the Swedish Cup.

== Men's Team ==
=== Seasons ===
Season	Rank	Note
2021–22	2nd	Runner-up – lost to IBF Falun in final
2022–23	5th	Quarterfinal loss to Pixbo Wallenstam IBK
2023–24	5th	Quarterfinal loss to Växjö Vipers
2024–25	5th	Quarterfinal loss to Pixbo IBK
2025–26	5th	Quarterfinal loss to Växjö Vipers

=== Known Players ===
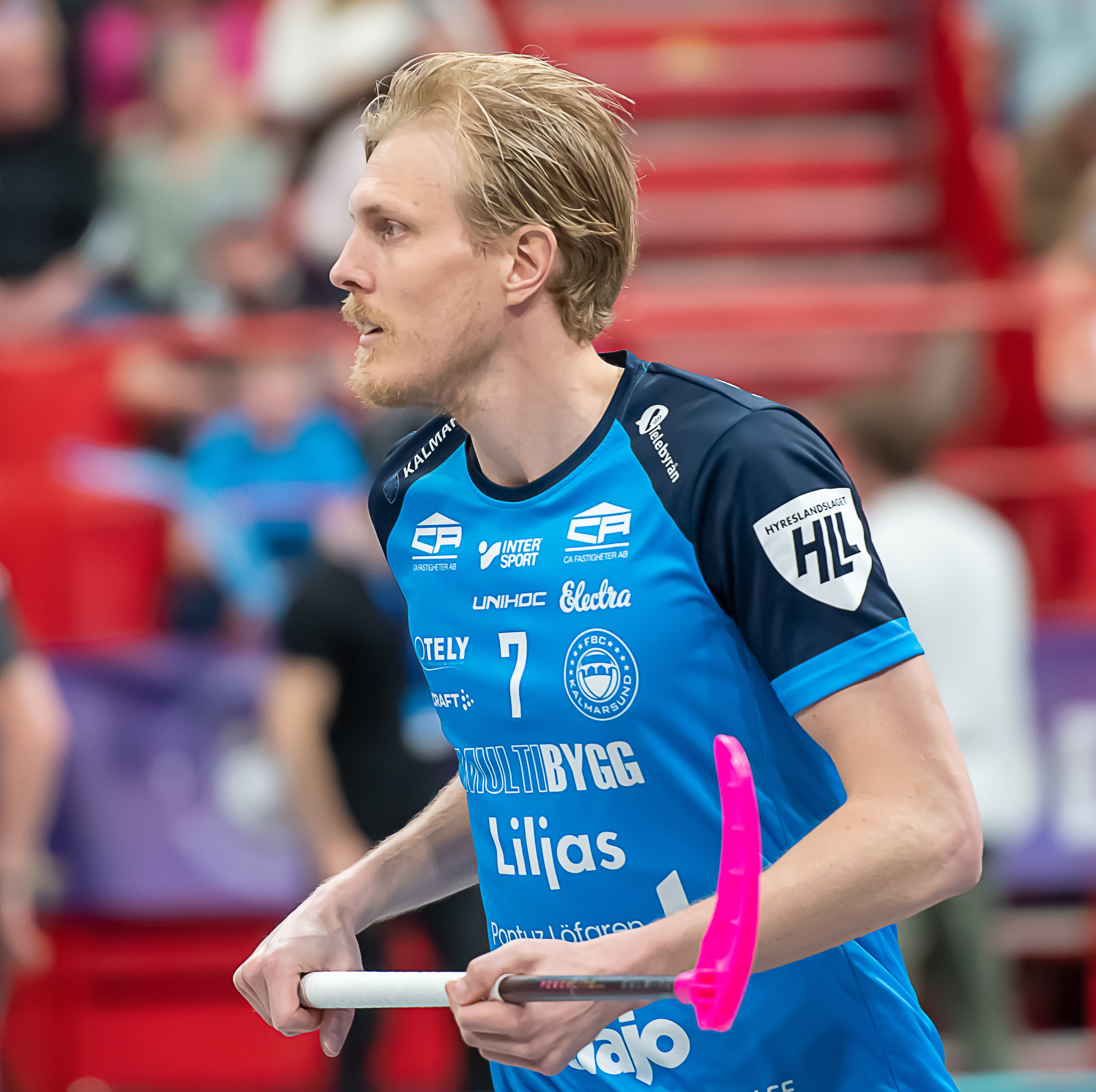
Kalmarsund's most famous player, Kim Nilsson

- Kim Nilsson (Färjestadens IBK 2005–2008, 2016–2025)

== Women's Team ==
=== Seasons ===
Season	Rank	Note
2021–22		Promoted
2022–23	7th	Quarterfinal loss to Pixbo Wallenstam IBK
2023–24	7th	Quarterfinal loss to Team Thorengruppen
2024–25	5th	Quarterfinal loss to Västerås Rönnby IBK
2025–26	2nd	Runner-up – lost to Team Thorengruppen in final

=== Champions Cup ===
Tournament	Rank	Note
2027 Champions Cup	–	–
