= Pixbo IBK =

Swedish floorball club

- Founded: 1981
- League: Men: Swedish Super League; Women: Swedish Super League
- Championships: Men: SSL (2001–02, 2002–03); Champions Cup (2003–04, 2024–25); Women: SSL (2015–16); Champions Cup (2016, 2024–25)

Pixbo IBK, also known as Redfox, is a Swedish floorball club, based in Mölnlycke, Västra Götaland, near Gothenburg. It was known officially as Pixbo Wallenstam IBK after its sponsor until June 2023. The club was founded in 1981 and is one of the oldest Swedish floorball clubs.

The men's team plays in the Swedish Super League. The team has played in the top Swedish competition continuously since its inception in 1989. In the 2001–02 and 2002–03 seasons they won two consecutive championships. In 2024, they won the Swedish Cup. In 2004 and 2025, they won the Champions Cup, with the 2025 victory marking Pixbo as the first club in history to win gold in both the men's and women's categories in the same year.

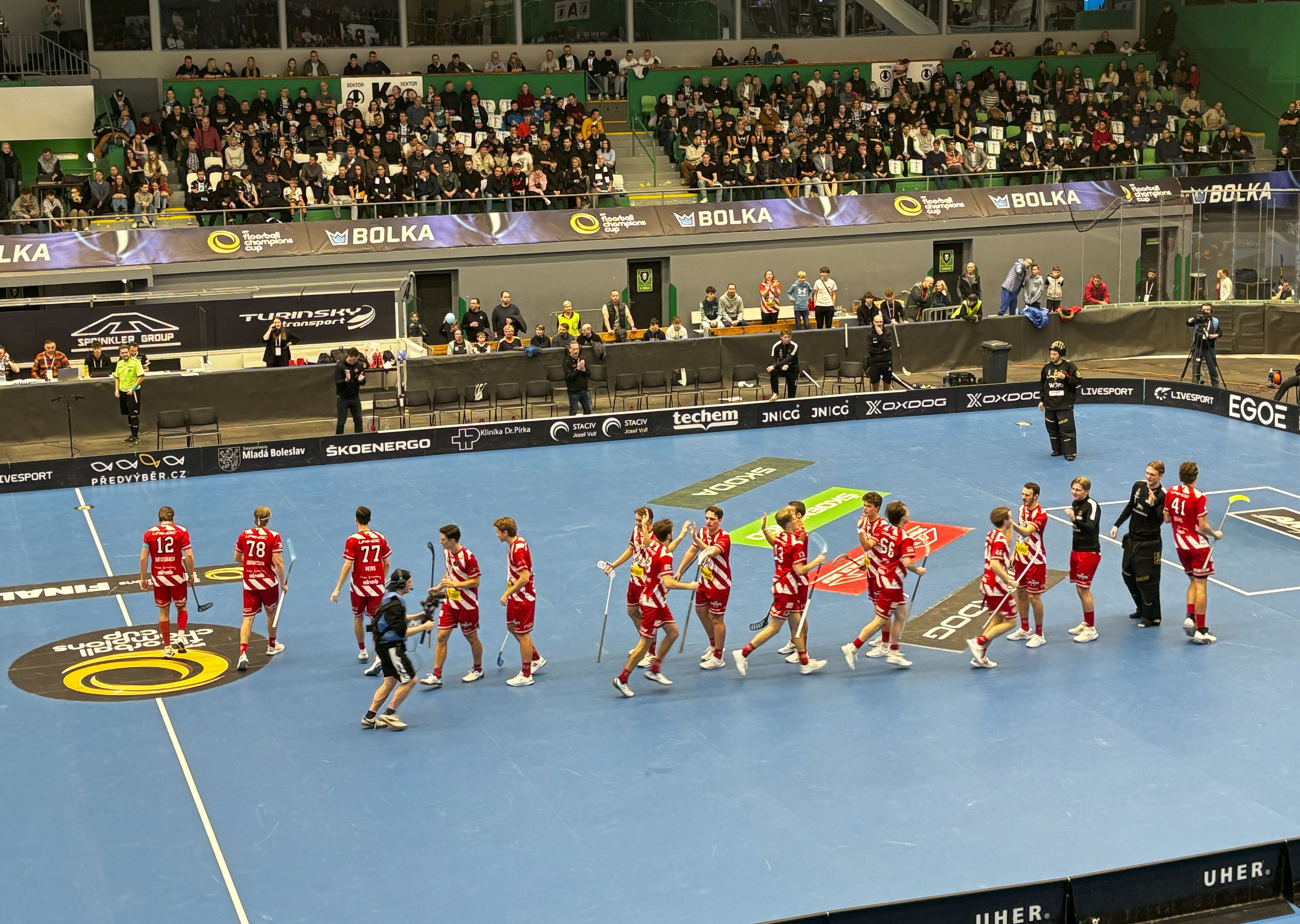
The men's team celebrating a goal in 2024–25 Champions Cup finals

The women's team plays in the Swedish Super League too. The women also played in the top national competition already in its first edition in 1997–98, but were immediately relegated. Since returning after two years in 2000, they have been playing the top league continuously. In the 2015–16 season the team won the championship title. In 2023, the team won the Swedish Cup. They won the Champions Cup in 2016 and 2025.

== Men's team ==
=== Recent seasons ===
Pixbo player Martin Östholm in 2014

| Season | Rank | Note |
|---|---|---|
| 2020–21 | 9th | — |
| 2021–22 | 8th | Quarterfinal loss to Växjö IBK |
| 2022–23 | 4th | Semifinal loss to IBF Falun |
| 2023–24 | 2nd | Runner-up – lost to Storvreta IBK in final |
| 2024–25 | 4th | Semifinal loss to Storvreta IBK |
| 2025–26 | 7th | Quarterfinal loss to IBF Falun |

=== Champions Cup ===
| Tournament | Rank | Note |
|---|---|---|
| 2002–03 European Cup | 2nd | Runner-up – lost to (Sweden) Haninge IBK in final |
| 2003–04 European Cup | 1st | Champions – defeated (Finland) Espoon Oilers in final |
| 2004–05 European Cup | 2nd | Runner-up – lost to (Switzerland) SV Wiler-Ersigen in final |
| 2016 Champions Cup | 4th | Semifinal loss to (Finland) Classic |
| 2025 Champions Cup | 1st | Champions – defeated (Czech Republic) Florbal MB in final |

== Women's team ==
=== Recent seasons ===
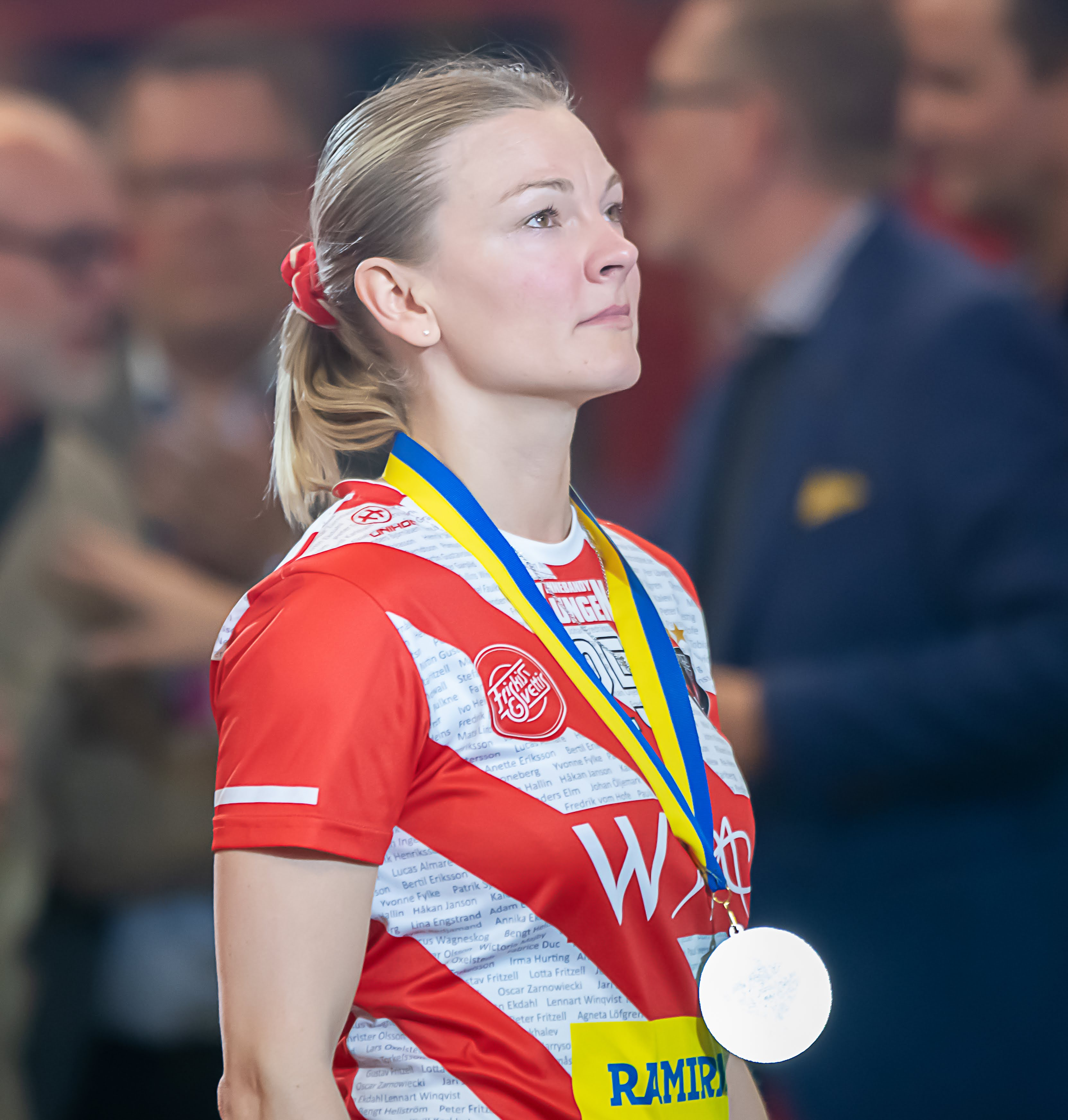
Pixbo player Mia Karjalainen with a silver medal after 2021–22 finals

| Season | Rank | Note |
|---|---|---|
| 2020–21 | 2nd | Runner-up – lost to Team Thorengruppen in final |
| 2021–22 | 2nd | Runner-up – lost to Team Thorengruppen in final |
| 2022–23 | 2nd | Runner-up – lost to Team Thorengruppen in final |
| 2023–24 | 2nd | Runner-up – lost to Team Thorengruppen in final |
| 2024–25 | 2nd | Runner-up – lost to Team Thorengruppen in final |
| 2025–26 | 3rd | Semifinal loss to FBC Kalmarsund |

=== Champions Cup ===
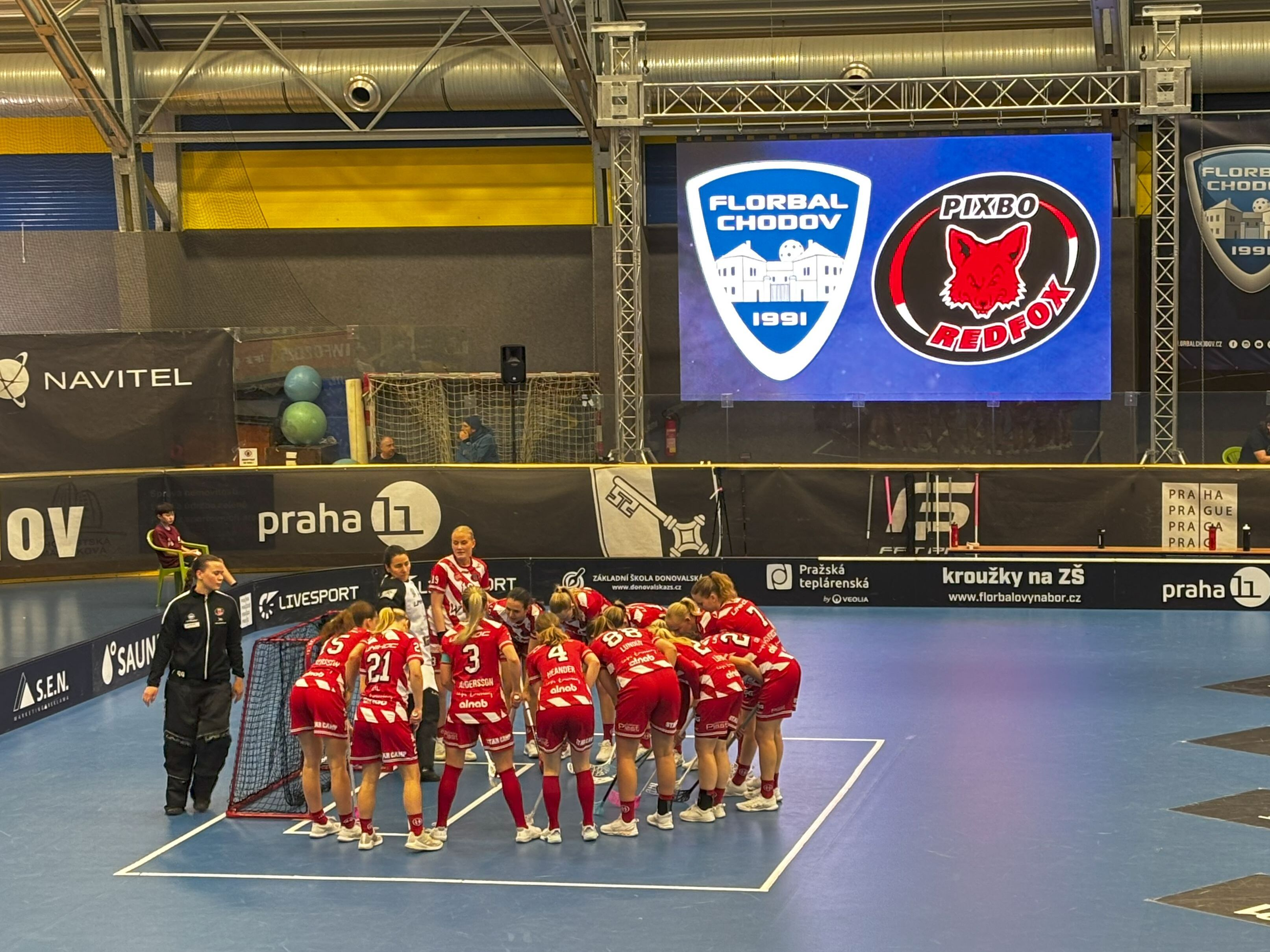
The women's team before the 2024–25 Champions Cup semifinals

| Tournament | Rank | Note |
|---|---|---|
| 2016 Champions Cup | 1st | Champions – defeated (Finland) Classic in final |
| 2024 Champions Cup | 2nd | Runner-up – lost to (Sweden) Thorengruppen IBK in final |
| 2025 Champions Cup | 1st | Champions – defeated (Sweden) Thorengruppen IBK in final |
| 2026 Champions Cup | – | Semifinal loss to (Sweden) Thorengruppen IBK |

=== Known players ===
- Moa Andersson (2019–now)
- Lara Heini (2020–now)
- Eliška Krupnová (2015–2024)
- Emelie Wibron (2013–2014)

== Gallery ==
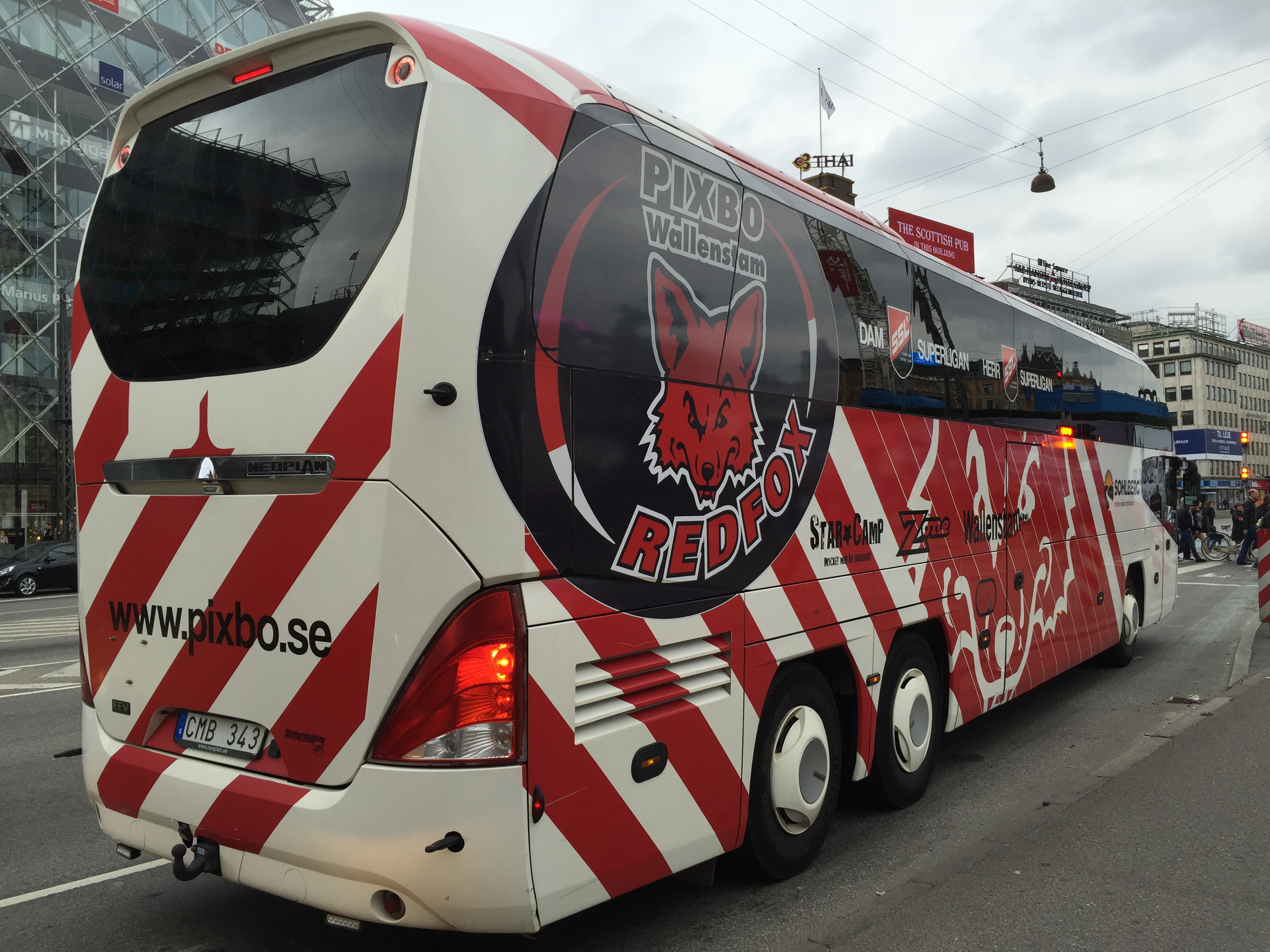
Club bus

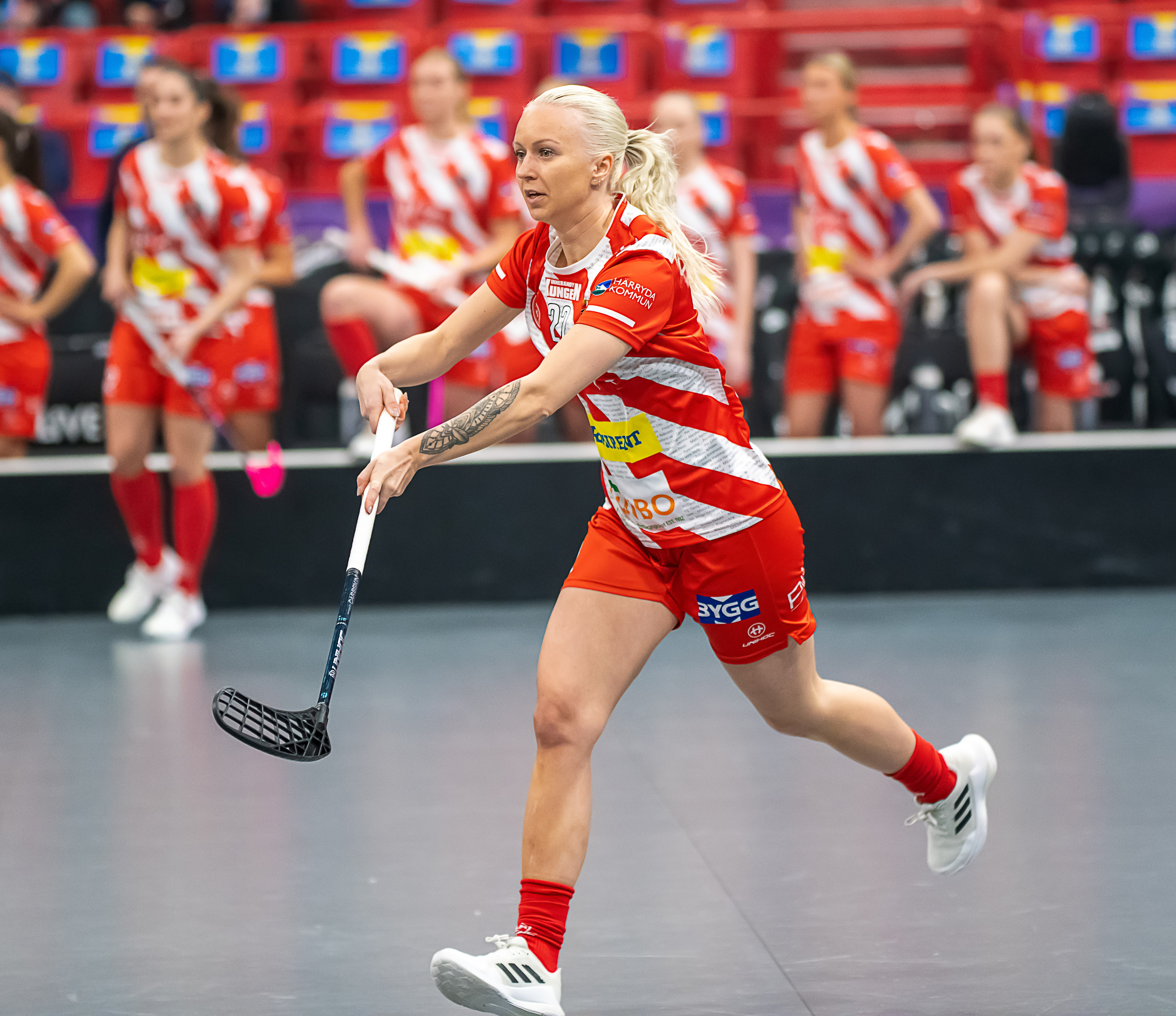
Pixbo player Laura Manninen in 2021–22 finals

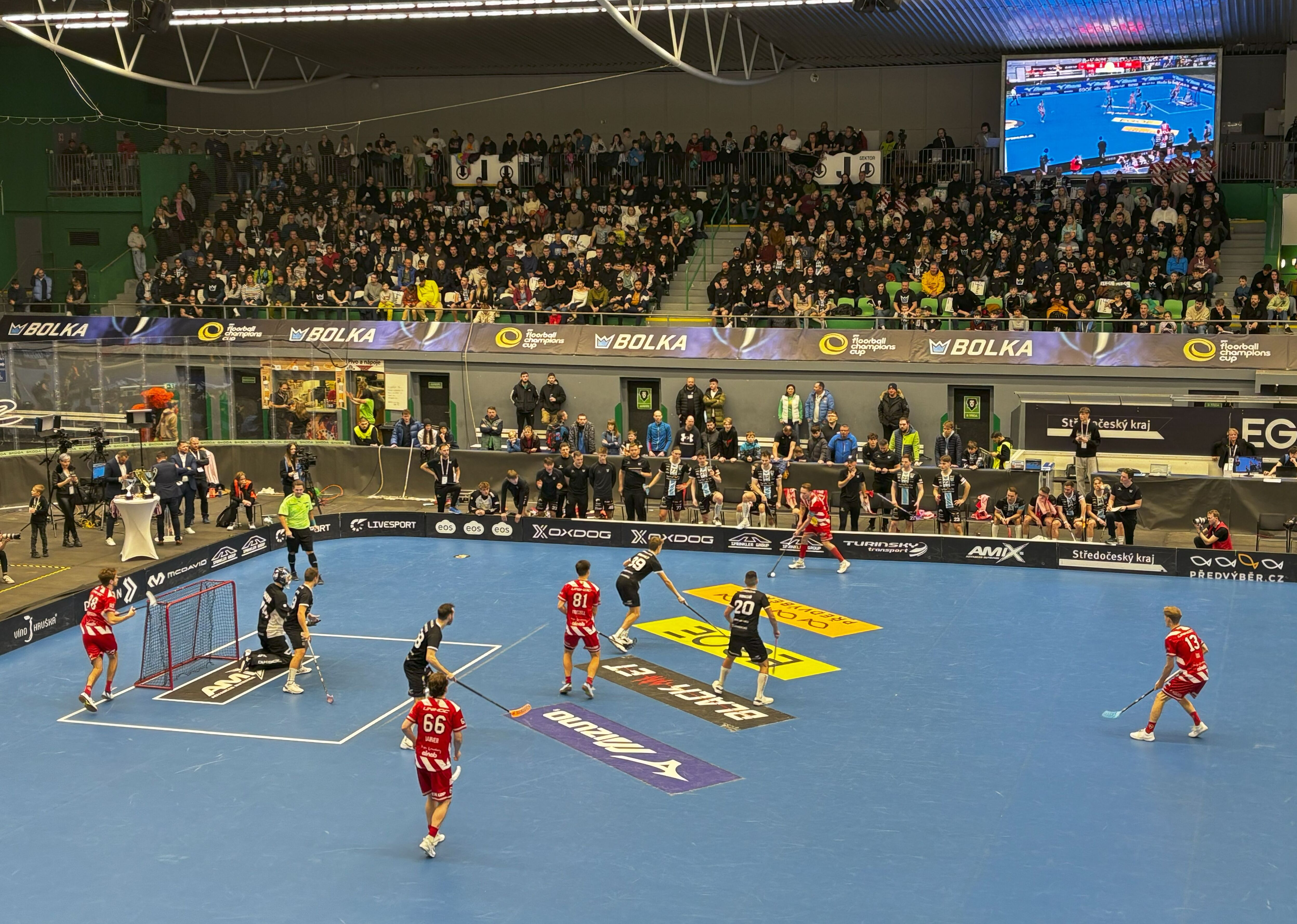
The men's team (in red) in the 2025 Champions Cup final
