= Täby FC =

Swedish floorball team

- Founded: 2006
- League: SSL

Täby FC is a Swedish floorball team from Täby, Stockholm. The club have played in the top Swedish floorball league, SSL, both on the men's and women's side. Their men's team have never won a championship but got to the final in 2006/07 where they lost to Warberg IC, and in 2009/2010 where they lost to Storvreta IBK. Their women's team won the championship in 2019.
