= Swedish Super League (men's floorball) =

Highest of the Swedish floorball leagues

- Sport: Floorball
- Founded: 1995; 31 years ago
- Administrator: Swedish Floorball Federation
- No. of teams: 14
- Country: Sweden
- Continent: Europe
- Most recent champion: Storvreta IBK (2026, 10th title)
- Most titles: Storvreta IBK (10 titles)
- Streaming partner: SSL TV
- Level on pyramid: Level 1
- Relegation to: Allsvenskan
- Domestic cup: Swedish Cup
- International cup: Champions Cup
- Website: ssl.se

Swedish Super League (SSL, Swedish: Svenska Superligan för herrar; formerly, Elitserien) is the highest league in the league system of Swedish floorball and comprises the top 14 Swedish floorball teams. The first season began in 1995–96.

The champion of the league is eligible to compete at the Champions Cup.

The most successful team in the league, with ten titles and the current champion of the 2025–26 season, is Storvreta IBK.

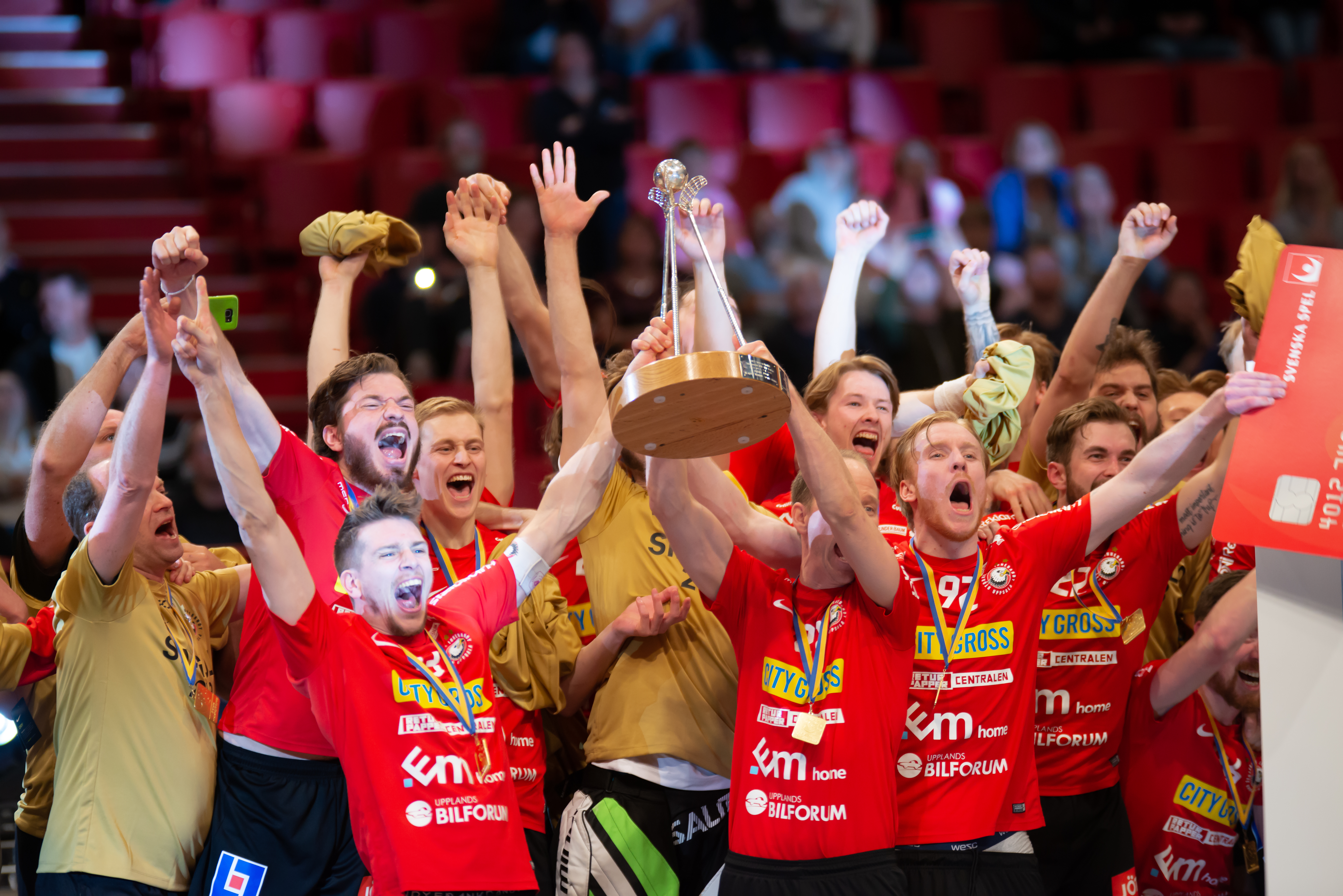
Storvreta IBK players celebrate the title in the 2017–18 season

== History ==
The Swedish Super League was founded in 1995 under the name Elitserien. It then replaced the Division 1 league as the high level floorball league of Sweden. Between the seasons 1995–96 and 1998–99 the league was divided into a northern and a southern group. Since the 1999–2000 season, it is a national league.

In March 2007, it was decided that the Elitserien will comprise 14 teams from the 2008–09 season. In May 2007, the name of league was changed from Elitserien to the Swedish Super League.

Mika Kohonen holds the record for points in one season (107 points in 29 games) and also the all-time record for points.

== Season structure ==
In the regular season, taking place approximately from September to March, all teams play each other twice, once at home and once away, resulting in a total of 26 rounds. At the end of the regular season, the top eight teams advance to the playoffs, which usually start in March and culminate in April. The quarterfinals and semifinals are played as best-of-seven series. The final is played as a single decisive match, known as the Superfinal. This is usually held at the Stockholm Globen Arena, together with the final of the women's Swedish Super League. The bottom two teams are relegated to the lower division, Allsvenskan.

== Current teams ==
Location of teams in the league

SSL teams in season 2025–26:

- AIK (Stockholm)
- FBC Kalmarsund (Kalmar)
- Hovslätts IK (Jönköping)
- IBF Falun
- Jönköpings IK
- Linköping IBK (Linköping)
- Mullsjö AIS
- Nykvarns Innebandy (Nykvarn)
- Pixbo IBK (Mölnlycke)
- Storvreta IBK (Uppsala)
- Strängnäs IBK (Strängnäs)
- Visby IBK (Visby)
- Växjö IBK
- Warberg IC (Varberg)

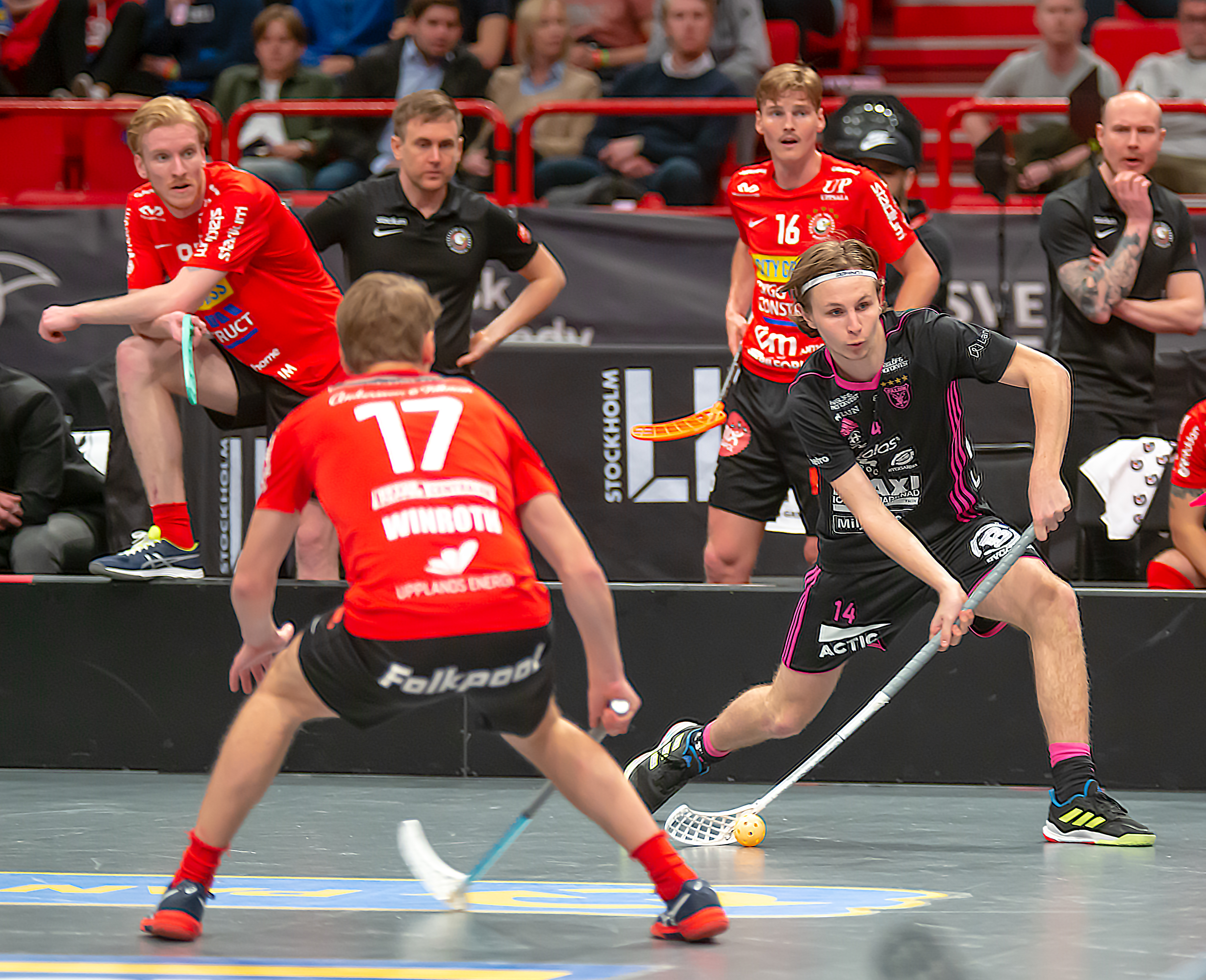
The final between Storvreta IBK and IBF Falun in the 2018–19 season

== Previous finalists ==
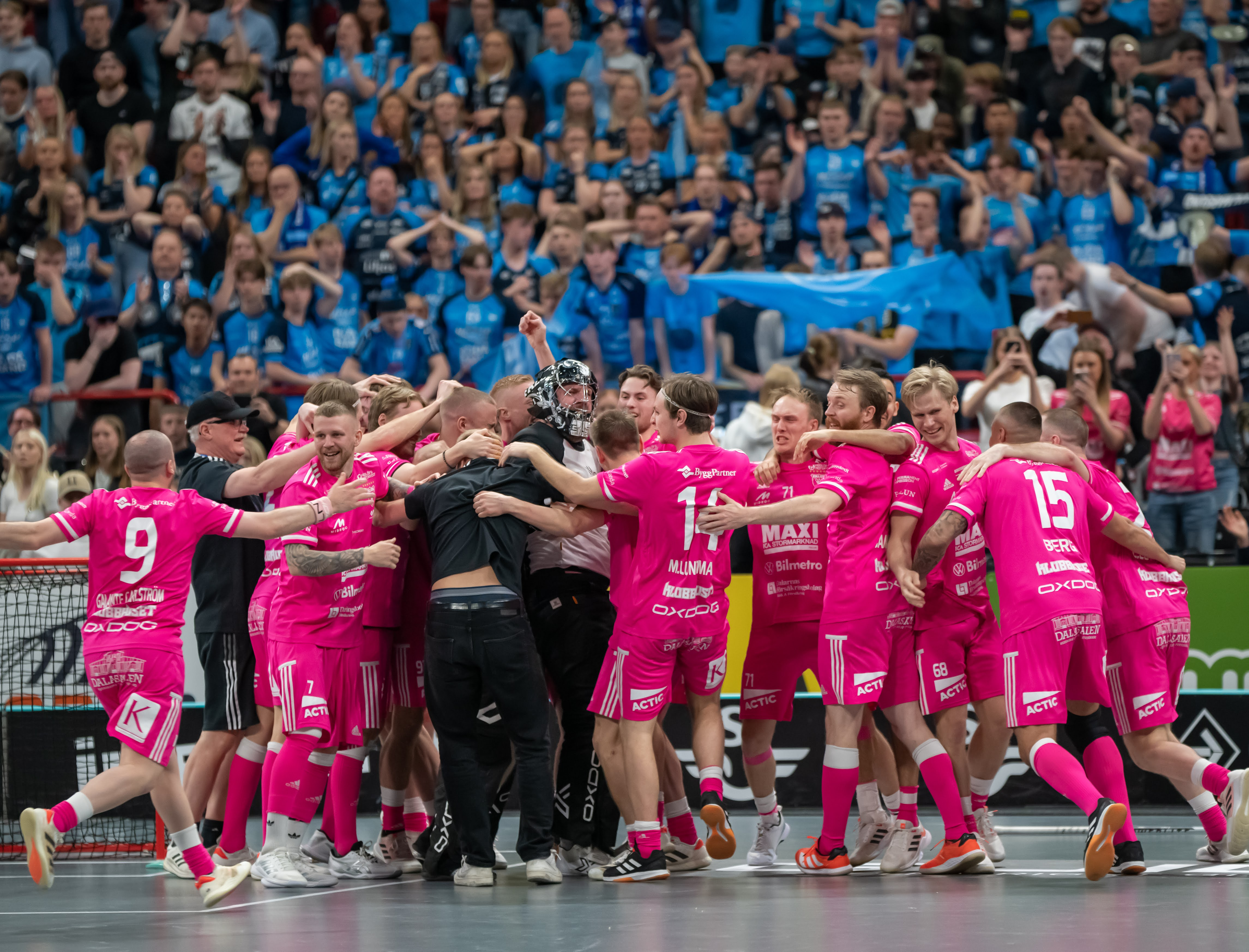
The IBF Falun team celebrates victory in the final of the 2021–22 season

Season	Champions	Runner-up
1983	Kolarbyns IBS	Hagsätra IBK
1984	Tomasgårdens IF	Team Smirt IBF
1985	Kolarbyns IBS	Väsby IBK
1986	Norrstrands IF	Jönköpings IK
1987	IBK Lockerud	IBK Strandgården
1988	IBK Lockerud	Jönköpings IK
1989	Kolarbyn/Fagersta IF	FK Ängen
1990	IBK Lockerud	Jönköpings IK
1991	IBK Lockerud	Tomasgårdens IF
1992	IBK Lockerud	Sjöstads IF
1993	Balrog IK	Sjöstads IF
1994	Fornudden IB	IBK Lockerud
1995	Kista IBK	Fornudden IB
1996	Balrog IK	IBF NB
1997	Fornudden IB	Sjöstads IF
1998	Warberg IC 85	Pixbo Wallenstam IBK
1999	Haninge IBK	Örnsköldsviks SK
2000	Haninge IBK	Pixbo Wallenstam IBK
2001	Haninge IBK	Warberg IC 85
2002	Pixbo Wallenstam IBK	Balrog IK
2003	Pixbo Wallenstam IBK	Warberg IC 85
2004	Balrog IK	AIK
2005	Warberg IC 85	AIK
2006	AIK	Pixbo Wallenstam IBK
2007	Warberg IC	Täby FC
2008	Warberg IC	AIK
2009	AIK	Warberg IC
2010	Storvreta IBK	Caperiotäby FC
2011	Storvreta IBK	Warberg IC
2012	Storvreta IBK	IBK Dalen
2013	IBF Falun	IBK Dalen
2014	IBF Falun	Storvreta IBK
2015	IBF Falun	Linköping IBK
2016	Storvreta IBK	Linköping IBK
2017	IBF Falun	Växjö IBK
2018	Storvreta IBK	IBF Falun
2019	Storvreta IBK	IBF Falun
2020	IBF Falun	Storvreta IBK
2021	IBF Falun	Storvreta IBK
2022	IBF Falun	FBC Kalmarsund
2023	Storvreta IBK	IBF Falun
2024	Storvreta IBK	Pixbo IBK
2025	Storvreta IBK	IBF Falun
2026	Storvreta IBK	IBF Falun

== List of champions ==
Team	Titles	Last
Storvreta IBK	10	2025–26
IBF Falun	7	2021–22
IBK Lockerud	5	1991–92
Warberg IC	4	2007–08
Kolarbyns IBS	3	1988–89
Balrog IK	3	2003–04
Haninge IBK	3	2000–01
Fornudden IB	2	1996–97
Pixbo IBK	2	2002–03
AIK Innebandy	2	2008–09
Kista IBK	1	1994–95
Norrstrands IF	1	1985–86
Tomasgårdens IF	1	1983–84
