= IBF Falun =

Swedish floorball club

- Official logo of IBF Falun
- Full name: Innebandyföreningen Falun
- Founded: 1993
- Arena: UW-Tech Arena
- Capacity: 2,500
- Coach: Men: Thomas Brottman
- Captain: Men: Emil Johansson
- League: Men: Svenska Superligan
- Championships: Men: SSL (2013, 2014, 2015, 2017, 2020, 2021, 2022); Champions Cup (2013, 2014, 2015, 2017, 2023)
Home colors	Away colors

IBF Falun is a Swedish floorball club based in the city of Falun, founded in 1993.

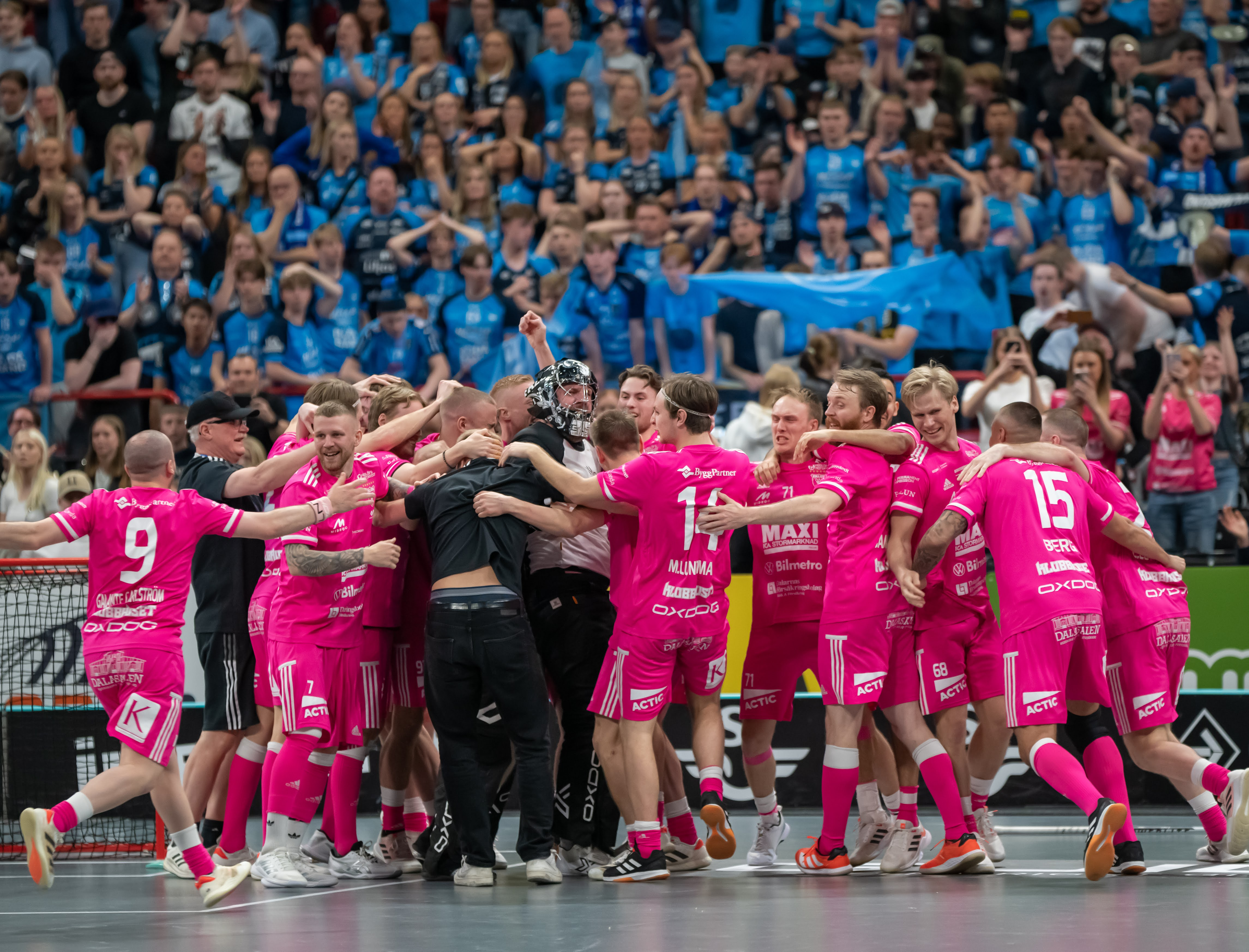
The men's team celebrating victory in the 2021–22 Swedish Super League final

The men's team has competed in the Swedish Super League since the 2004–05 season and has won the league championship seven times. They claimed their first title in 2012–13 and most recently won in 2021–22. The team also holds a record five Champions Cup victories, winning for the first time in 2012–13 and most recently in 2022–23.

The defunct women's team has also competed in the Swedish Super League from its inception in 1993 until the 2015–16 season, and again between the 2020–21 and 2024–25 seasons, when it was discontinued for financial reasons. During its initial tenure in the league, they finished as runners-up four times, first in the inaugural 1993–94 Division 1 season and most recently in 2008–09 Elitserien.

== Men's team ==
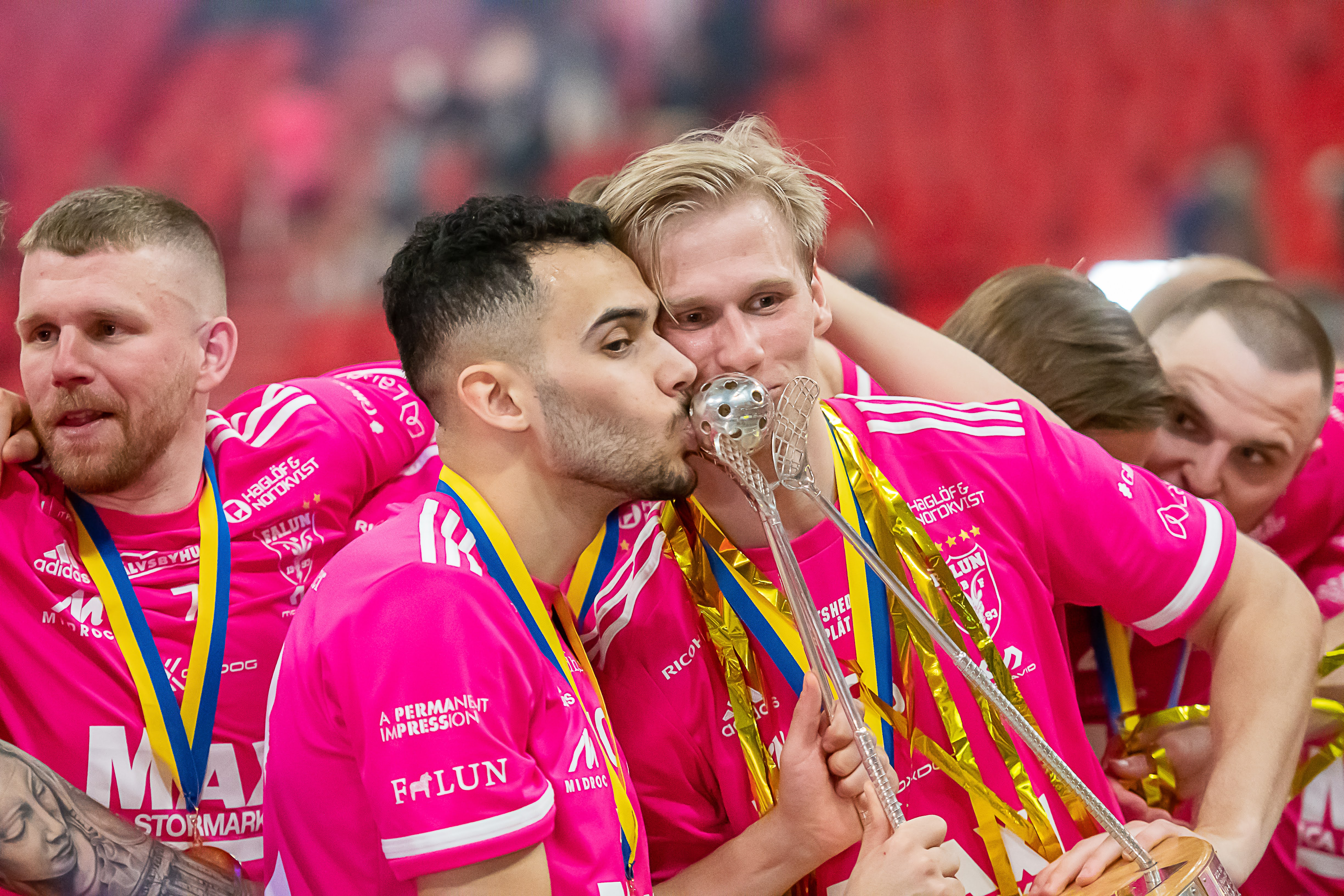
Players of Falun with the trophy for the winners of the 2022 Swedish Super League

=== Arena ===
Home games are played in the UW-Tech Arena (IBF Falun Arena) which was inaugurated 2005, under the name FaluKuriren Arena, and has a current capacity of 2,500 spectators. The arena is situated in Lugnet, Falun, the main venue for the FIS Nordic World Ski Championships 2015.

=== History ===
IBF Falun was founded in 1993 through a merger of Falu IBK, established in 1985, and HSK Falun, founded in 1986.

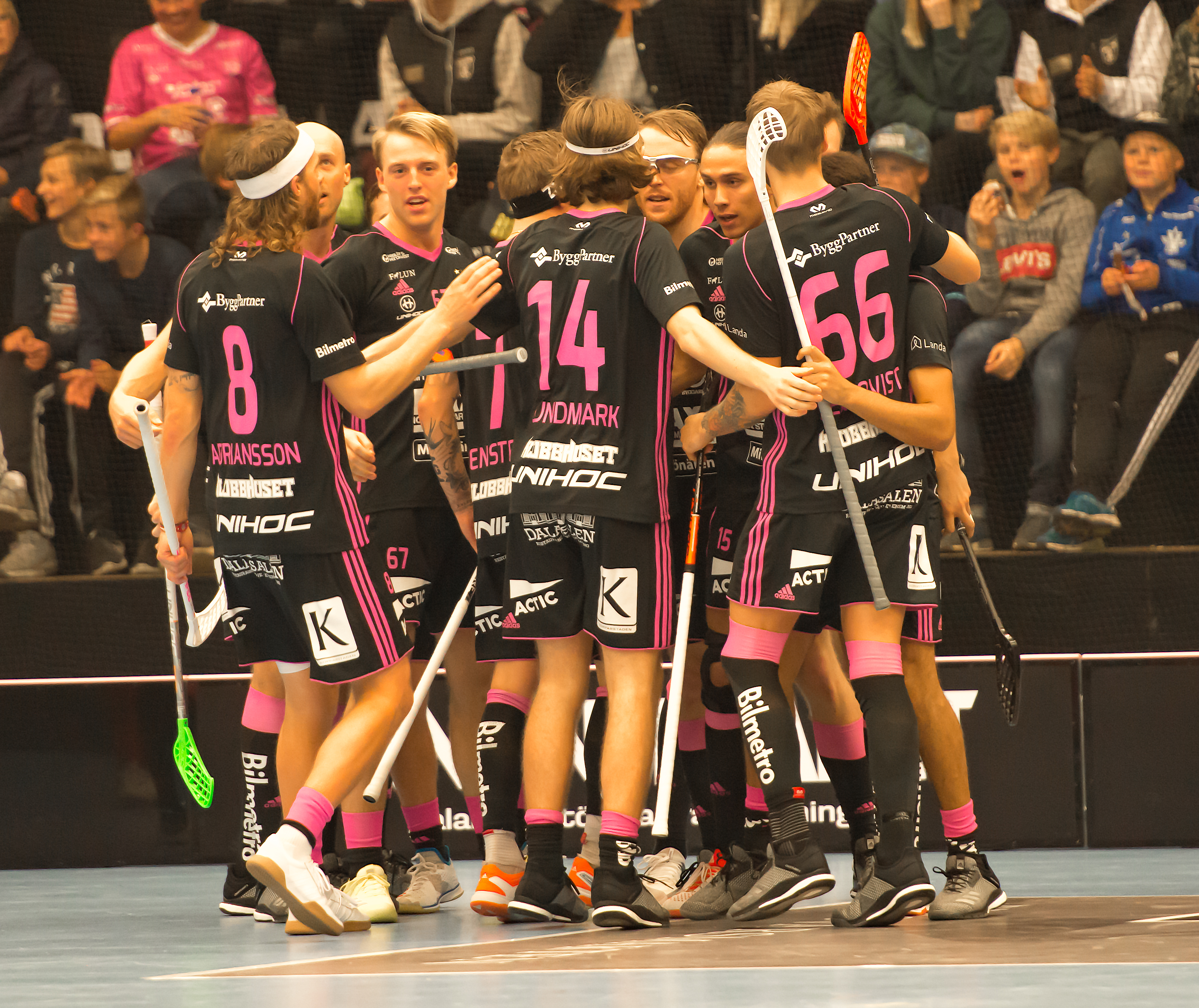
IBF Falun players in a match against Storvreta IBK in the 2018–19 Swedish Super League season.

In the 1993–94 season, the men's team won Division II and was promoted to Division I Västra, which was then part of the top tier. The team struggled in the highest division, repeatedly avoiding relegation due to league reorganizations, but eventually, in the 1999–00 season, they were relegated. The club returned to the top division before the 2004–05 season.

Starting in 2010, IBF Falun entered a golden era, sharing championship dominance with Storvreta IBK only. Key figures during this period included Alexander Galante Carlström, Rasmus Enström, Emil Johansson, and Johan Samuelsson. During this time, Falun won the Swedish Super League seven times (2012–13, 2013–14, 2014–15, 2016–17, 2019–20, 2020–21, 2021–22), making it the most successful team in the league until 2024, when it was surpassed by Storvreta. Falun holds a record of five Champions Cup titles (2013, 2014, 2015, 2017, 2023), tied with Storvreta. The team also won the Swedish Cup on two occasions, in 2023 and 2025.

=== Recent seasons ===
Season	Rank	Note
2020–21	1st	Champions – defeated Storvreta IBK in final
2021–22	1st	Champions – defeated FBC Kalmarsund in final
2022–23	2nd	Runner-up – lost to Storvreta IBK in final
2023–24	3rd	Semifinal loss to Pixbo IBK
2024–25	2nd	Runner-up – lost to Storvreta IBK in final

=== Champions Cup ===
Tournament	Rank	Note
2013 Champions Cup	1st	Champions – defeated (Finland) SPV in final
2014 Champions Cup	1st	Champions – defeated (Finland) Happee in final
2015 Champions Cup	1st	Champions – defeated (Switzerland) SV Wiler-Ersigen in final
2017 Champions Cup	1st	Champions – defeated (Finland) Classic in final
2023 Champions Cup	1st	Champions – defeated (Finland) Classic in final
2024 Champions Cup	2nd	Runner-up – lost to (Czech Republic) Tatran Střešovice in final
2026 Champions Cup	2nd	Runner-up – lost to (Sweden) Storvreta IBK in final

=== Known players ===
- Alexander Galante Carlström (2010–2024)
