= Tomasgårdens IF =

Floorball club in Västerås, Sweden

- Full name: Tomasgårdens idrottsförening
- Short name: TIF
- Founded: 1982
- Dissolved: 1999
- Arena: Västerås idrottshall, Västerås, Sweden

Tomasgårdens IF was a floorball club at the Thomas Church in Västerås in Sweden, established as a club in 1982 following the 1978 establishment of a floorball team and disestablished in 1999 following the merger with Västerås IBF. The men's team won the Swedish national championship in 1984, and played in the Swedish top division during the 1990s, losing the 1991 Swedish national championship finals to IBK Lockerud.
