= Sjöstads IF =

Sports club in Sjöstad, Sweden

- Full name: Sjöstads idrottsförening
- Sport: floorball soccer (earlier)
- Founded: 1977
- Based in: Karlstad, Sweden
- Arena: Universalen (floorball)

Sjöstads IF is a floorball club in Karlstad, Sweden, established in 1977 as a soccer club. In 1984 the floorball section was started, and the soccer section was later disestablished. During 1990s, both the men's and the women's teams played in the Swedish top division. The women's team even won the 1993–1994 Swedish national championship.

From the 2001–2002 season, the club became inactive, and instead played floorball together with IBF NB 87 under the name Karlstads IBF. From the 2005–2006, Sjöstads IF as a club returned.
