= Wallenstam =

Swedish property company

Wallenstam AB (publ) is a Swedish property company based in Gothenburg. Established in 1944, the company is listed on Nasdaq Stockholm, Large Cap.

In addition to its home city of Gothenburg, the company also operates in Stockholm, Uppsala and Helsingborg.
