= Storvreta IBK =

Floorball club in Storvreta, Sweden

- Official logo of Storvreta IBK
- Full name: Storvreta Innebandyklubb
- Nickname(s): Vreta
- Founded: 1989
- Arena: IFU Arena
- League: Men: Svenska Superligan; Women: Svenska Superligan
- All-time top scorer: Mika Kohonen
- Championships: SSL (2010–2012, 2016, 2018, 2019, 2023–2026); Champions Cup (2010, 2012, 2016, 2020, 2026)
Home colors	Away colors

Storvreta Innebandyklubb or Storvreta IBK is a floorball club based in Storvreta, Sweden. The team plays its home matches in IFU Arena in Uppsala.

The men's team plays in Sweden's highest floorball league, the Swedish Super League (SSL), since 2001–02 season. They advanced to the playoffs for the first time in the 2003–04 season and have reached them every year since. The team won its first championship title in 2010. In total, they have won a record ten titles, most recently in the 2025–26 season. In addition, they have finished as runners-up three times. The team has also won the Champions Cup five times; first in 2010 (then known as the Euro Floorball Cup), and most recently in 2026. With their fifth title, they tied the record held by IBF Falun. In 2026, they also won the Swedish Cup, thereby completing a treble.

The women's team also plays in the top league, the Swedish Super League, starting from the 2025–26 season. They had previously played in it for one season in 1999–00.

== Men's Team ==
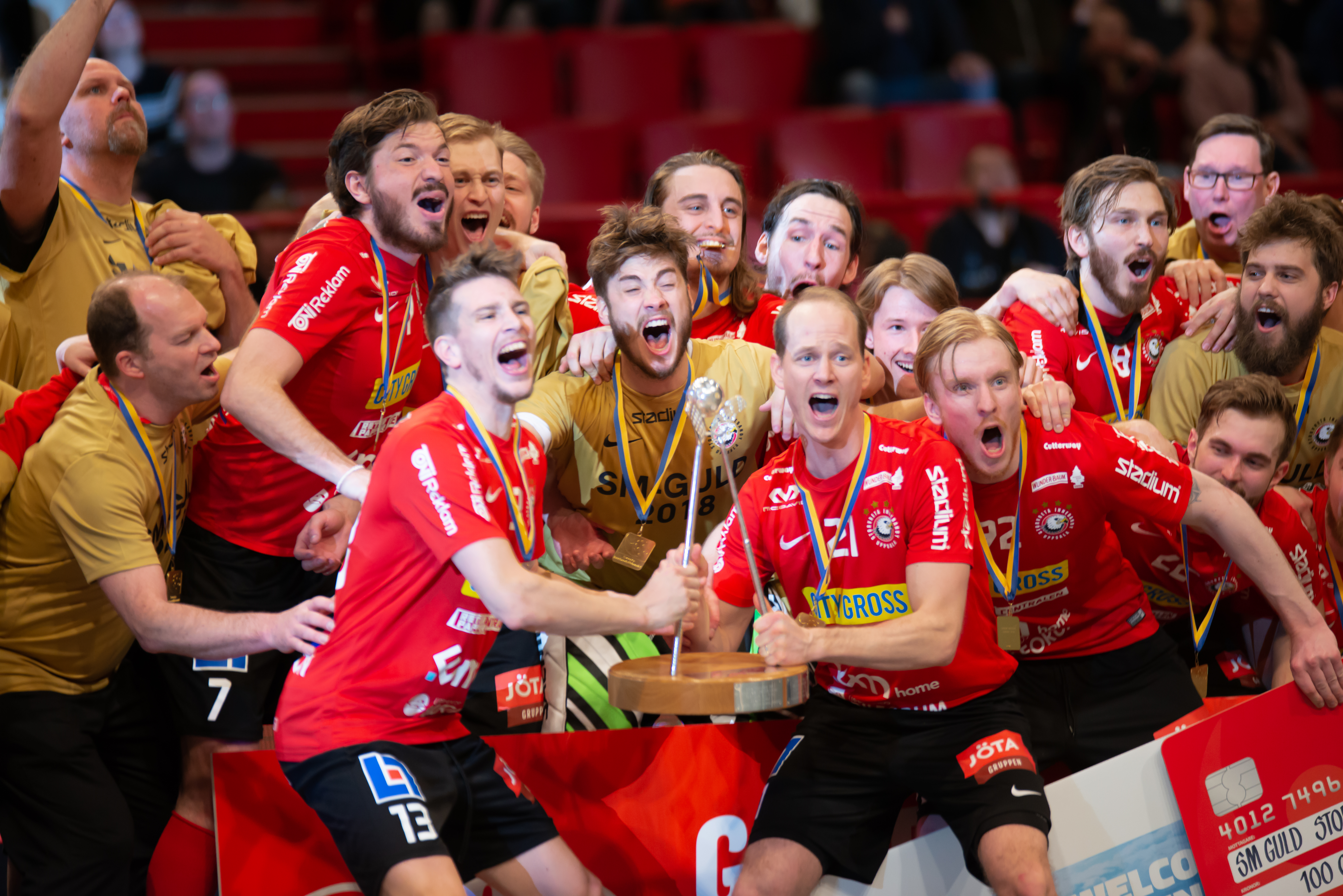
Storvreta IBK players celebrating their championship title in the 2017–18 season

=== Seasons ===
Season	Rank	Note
2019–20	2nd	Play-offs cancelled
2020–21	2nd	Runner-up – lost to IBF Falun in final
2021–22	4th	Semifinal loss to IBF Falun
2022–23	1st	Champions – defeated IBF Falun in final
2023–24	1st	Champions – defeated Pixbo IBK in final
2024–25	1st	Champions – defeated IBF Falun in final
2025–26	1st	Champions – defeated IBF Falun in final

=== Champions Cup ===
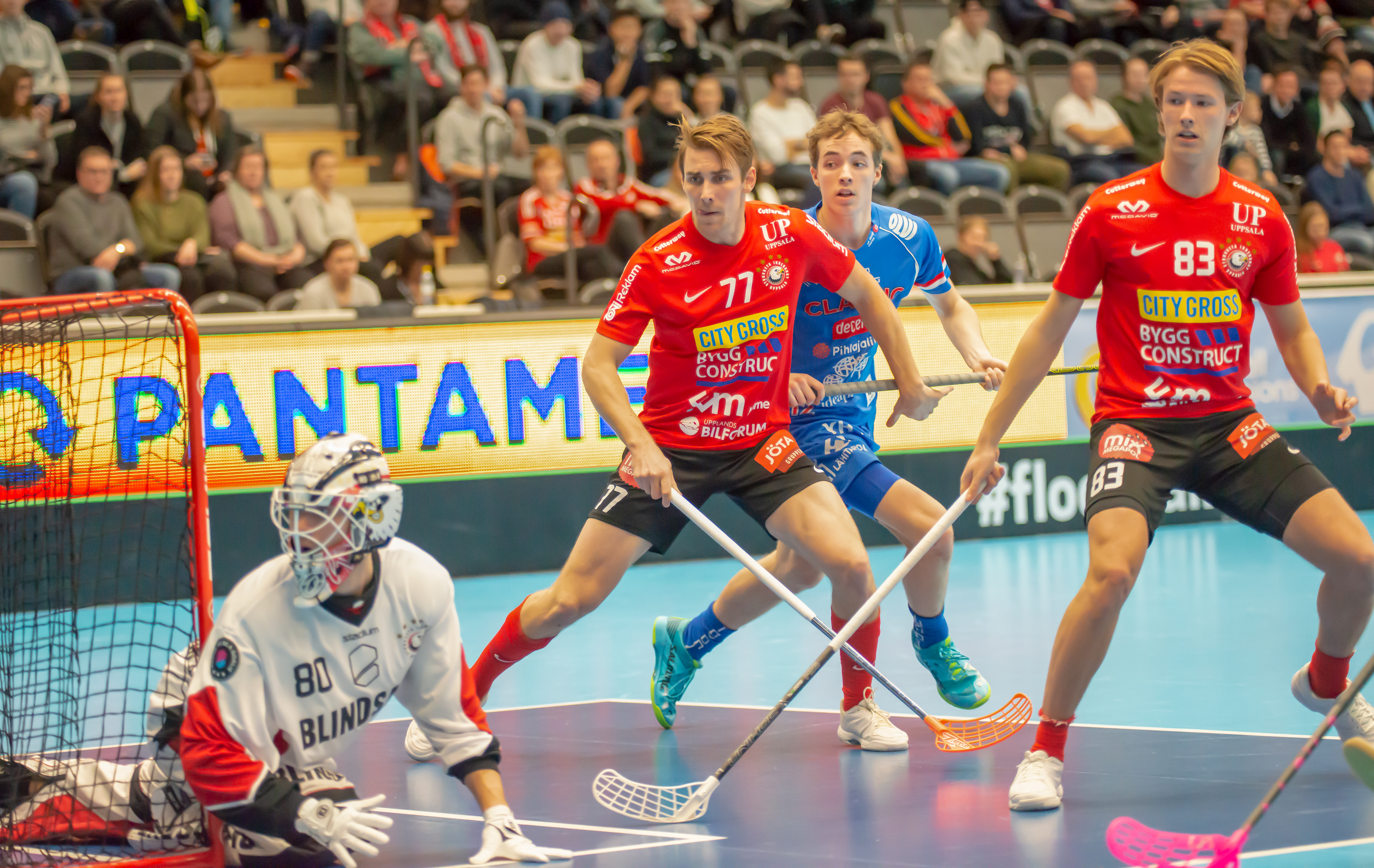
Storvreta IBK players in the Champions Cup final in 2019

Tournament	Rank	Note
2010 Euro Floorball Cup	1st	Champions – defeated (Czech Republic) 1. SC Vítkovice in final
2011 Champions Cup	3rd	Semifinal loss to (Finland) SSV Helsinki
2012 Champions Cup	1st	Champions – defeated (Sweden) IBK Dalen in final
2016 Champions Cup	1st	Champions – defeated (Finland) Classic in final
2019 Champions Cup	2nd	Runner-up – lost to (Finland) Classic in final
2020 Champions Cup	1st	Champions – defeated (Switzerland) SV Wiler-Ersigen in final
2024 Champions Cup	–	Semifinal loss to (Sweden) IBF Falun
2025 Champions Cup	–	Quarterfinal loss to (Finland) Nokian KrP
2026 Champions Cup	1st	Champions – defeated (Sweden) IBF Falun in final

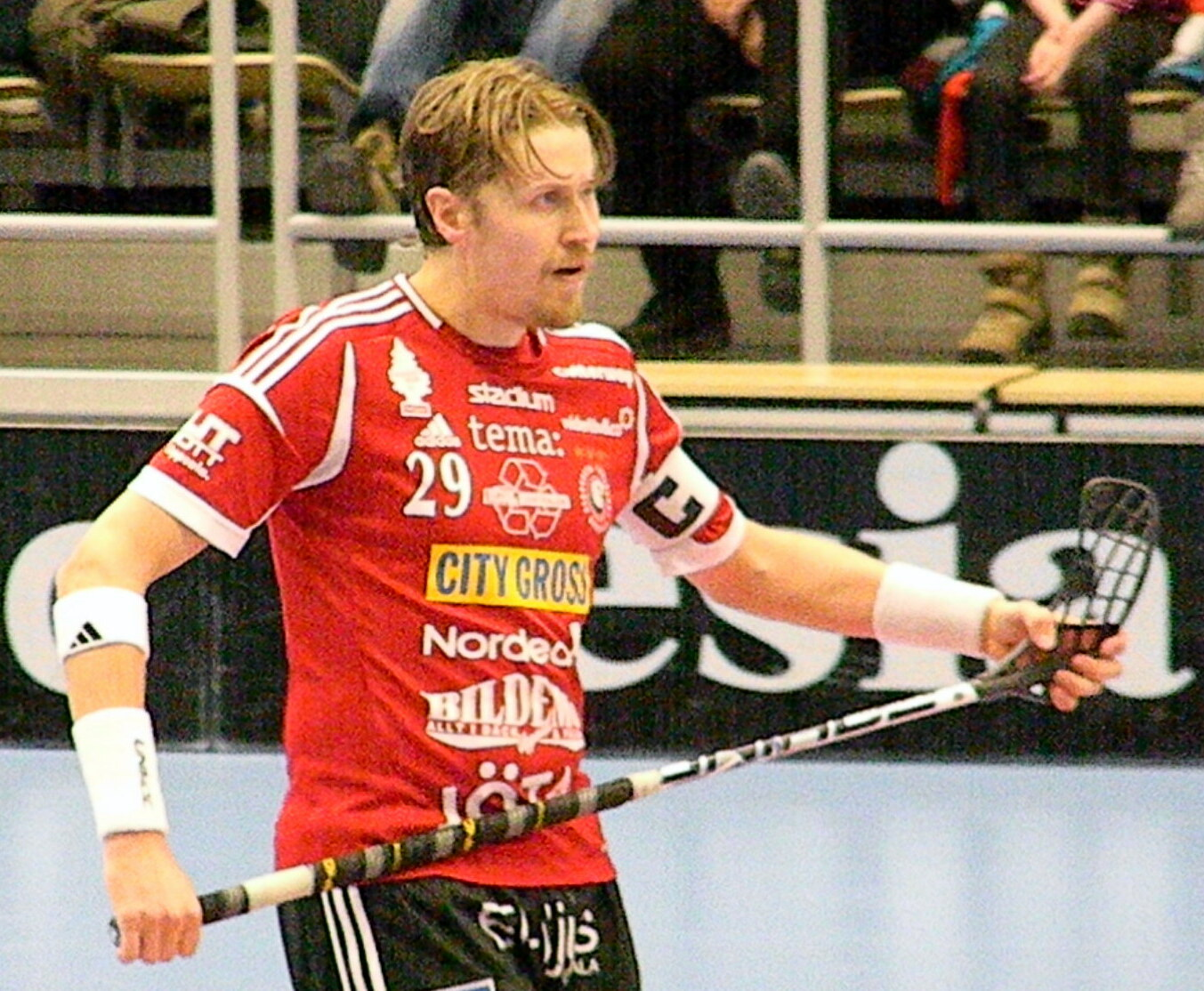
Mika Kohonen in 2013 wearing the Storvreta IBK jersey

=== Known Coaches ===
- Mika Kohonen (2022–2026)

=== Known Players ===
- Mika Kohonen (2005–2015)
- Sakarias Ulriksson (2023–)

== Women's Team ==
=== Seasons ===
Season	Rank	Note
The team was promoted in 2024–25 season
2025–26	7th	Quarterfinal loss to Pixbo IBK

=== Known Players ===
- Anna Wijk (2020, 2024–)

== Gallery ==
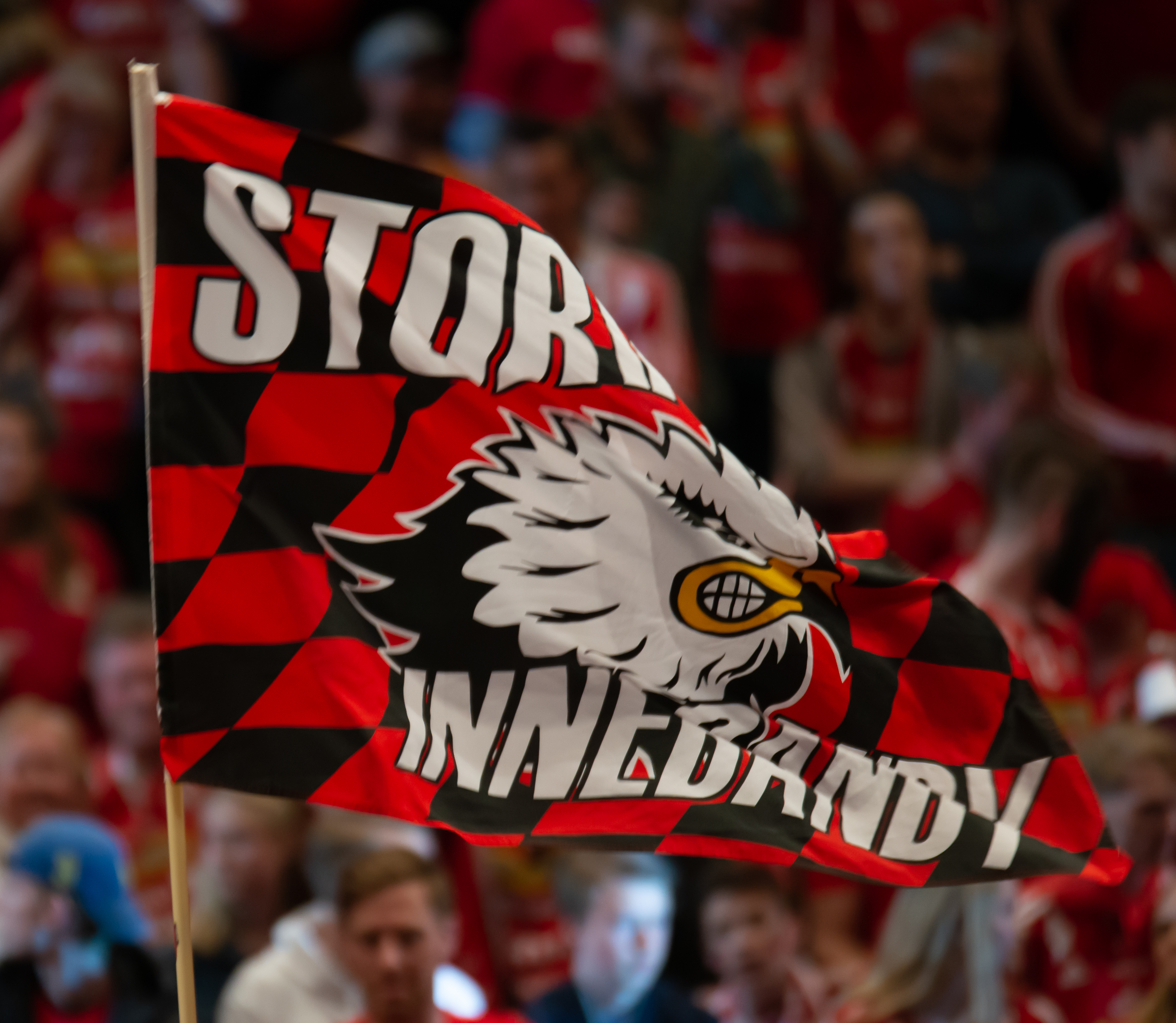
Flag with the club logo

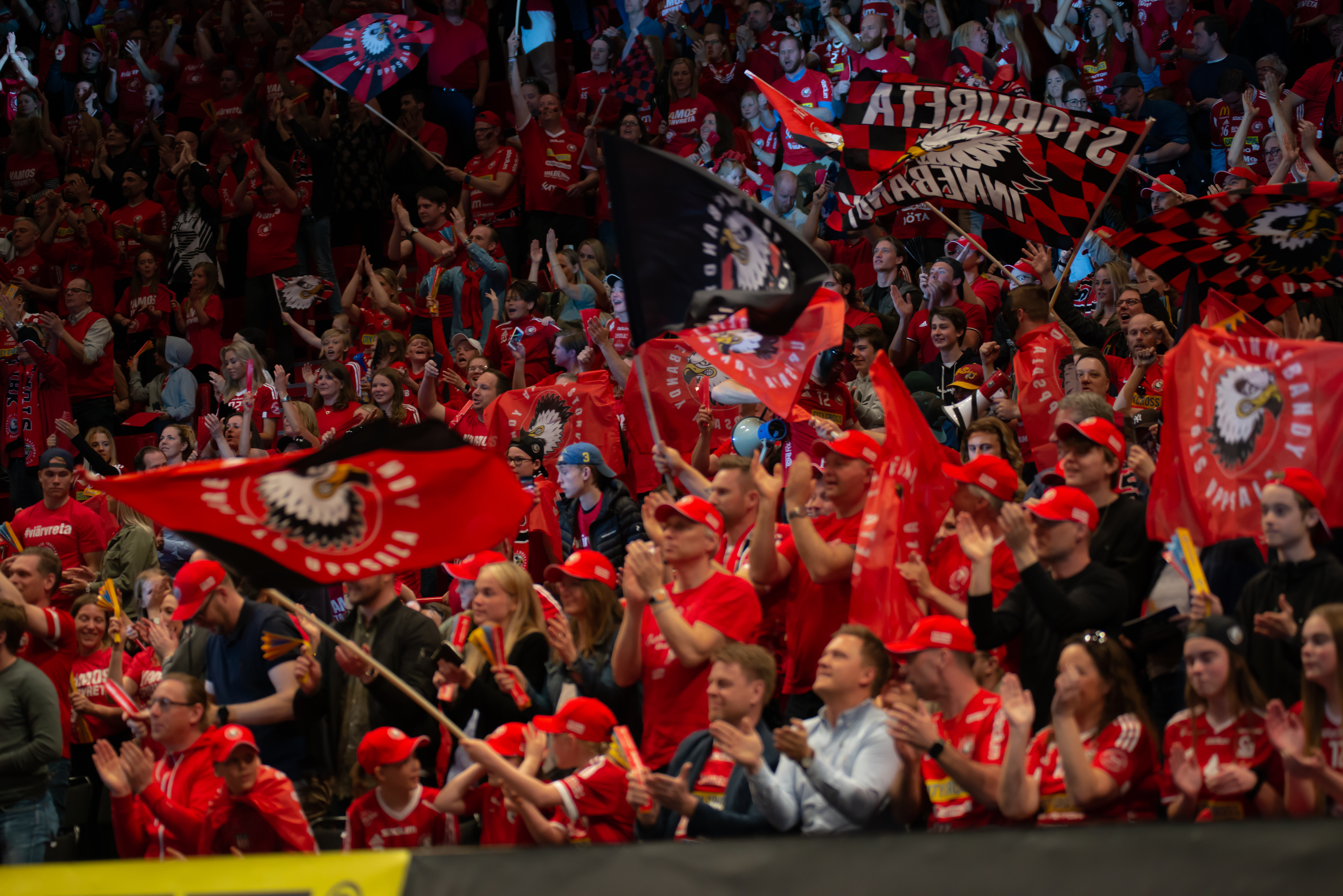
Storvreta IBK fans celebrating their championship title in the 2017–18 season

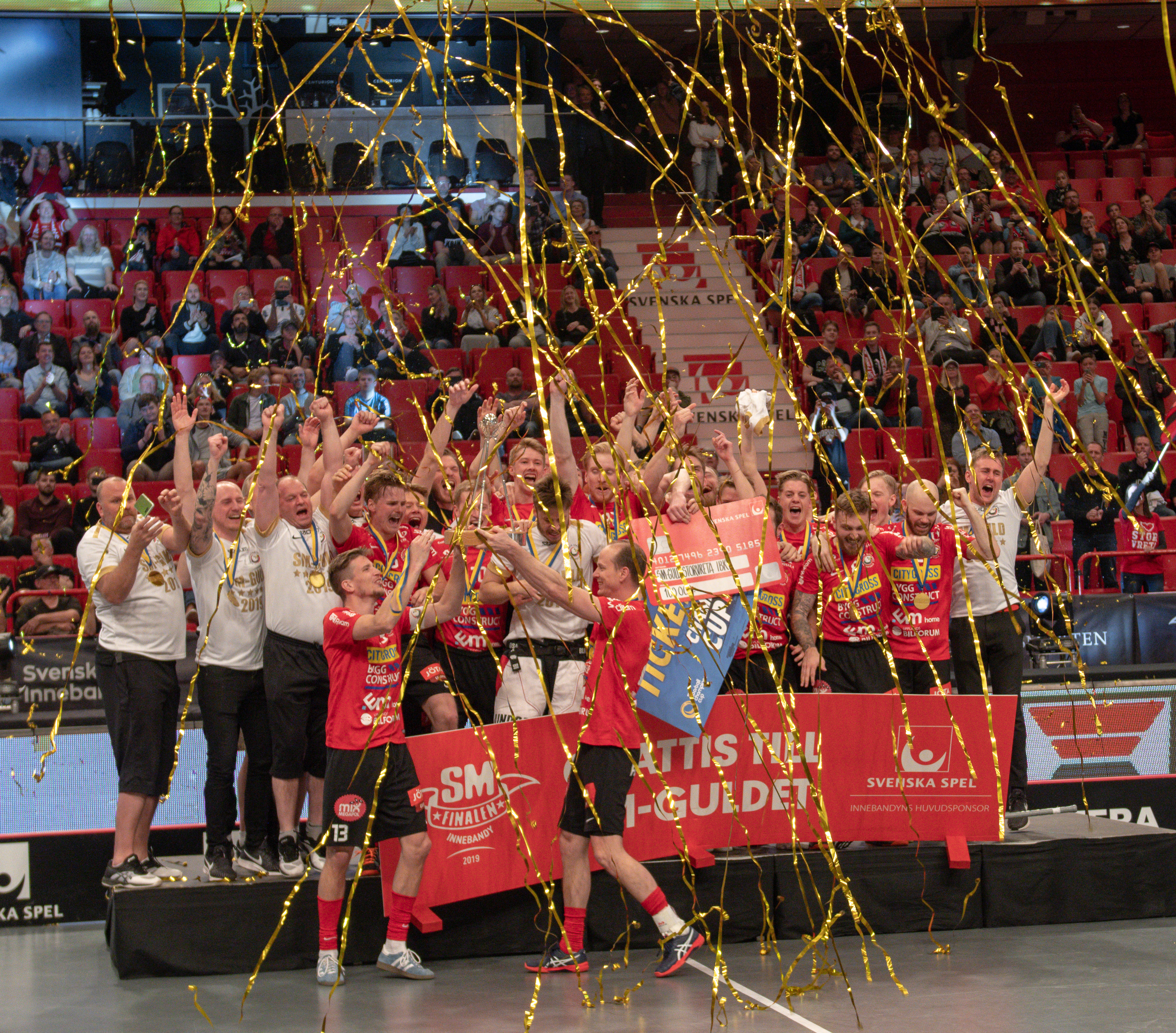
Storvreta IBK players celebrating their championship title in the 2018–19 season

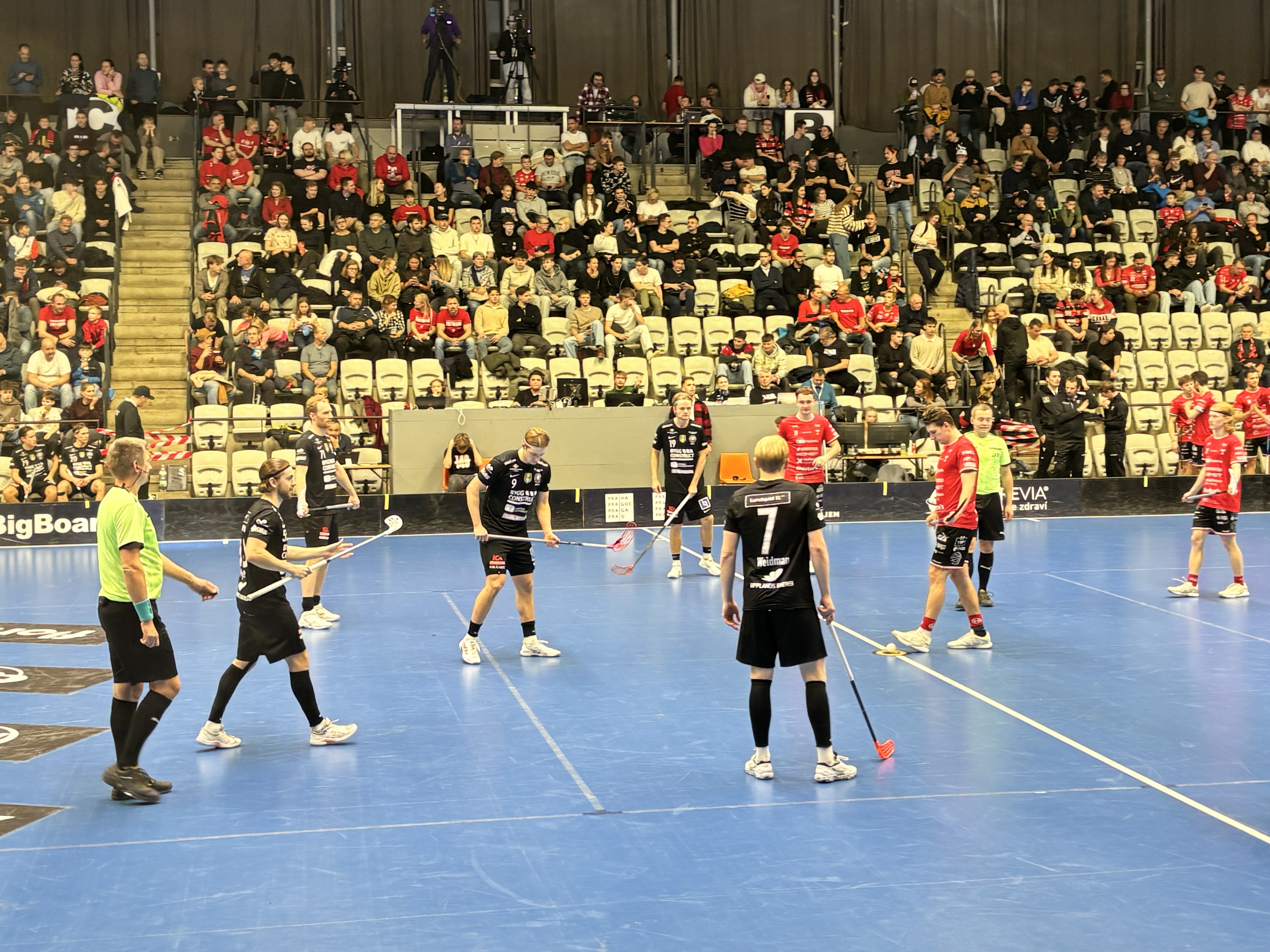
Storvreta IBK players (in black) in the 2026 Champions Cup semifinal
