= IBK Dalen =

Swedish floorball club

- Official logo of IBK Dalen
- Full name: Innebandyklubben Dalen
- Nickname(s): IBK Dalen
- Founded: 1990
- Captain: (Norway) Ketil Kronberg (men's) (Sweden) Clara Forssén (women's)
- League: SSL (women's, men's)

Innebandyklubb Dalen, abbreviated IBK Dalen, is a floorball club from the town of Umeå in the north of Sweden. Their men's and women's team both play in the top-tier league in Sweden, known as the Swedish Super League (women's, men's). They travel about 300 miles to their nearest away match.

The 2022–2023 season saw the men's team being relegated from the Swedish Superleague following 26 seasons in a row in the Swedish top division.

== Men's roster ==
As of August 27, 2020

| # | Nat. | Player | Pos. | Grip | Age | Acquired | Birthplace |
|---|---|---|---|---|---|---|---|
| | (Sweden) | Anton Grönlund | G | | 24 |
| 94 | (Sweden) | Måns Parsjö Tegnér | G | | 31 |
| 4 | (Sweden) | Mattias Ljunggren | D | R | 35 |
| 5 | (Sweden) | Ludwig Svensson | D | L | 27 |
| 8 | (Sweden) | Rasmus Andersson | D | | 27 |
| 11 | (Sweden) | Johan Larsson | D | L | 30 |
| 24 | (Sweden) | Anton Ahlbäck | D | | 24 |
| 55 | (Sweden) | Viktor Nystedt | D | L | 29 |
| 65 | (Sweden) | Albin Carlsten | D | | 23 |
| 72 | (Sweden) | Pär Forsman | D | L | 29 |
| | (Sweden) | John Stenström | F | | 27 |
| 2 | (Sweden) | Jonas Landström | F | | 32 |
| 9 | (Sweden) | Sebastian Degeryd | F | R | 31 |
| 10 | (Sweden) | Wilhelm Vihtari Hansson | F | | 25 |
| 18 | (Sweden) | Alexander Hedlund | F | L | 29 |
| 23 | (Sweden) | Daniel Sonidsson | F | L | 28 |
| 25 | (Norway) | Ketil Kronberg | F | L | 44 |
| 71 | (Sweden) | Christoffer Andersson | F | R | 28 |
| 77 | (Sweden) | Anton Åkerlund | F | R | 28 |
| 88 | (Sweden) | Jacob Mäkeläinen | F | | 29 |
| | (Sweden) | Tobias Sikström | C | | 27 |
| 21 | (Sweden) | Linus Holmgren | C | L | 27 |
| 27 | (Sweden) | Niclas Brohlin Ljung | C | R | 27 |
