= Växjö Vipers =

Floorball club in Växjö, Sweden

Växjö Vipers/Växjö IBK
- Växjö
- Nickname(s): Vipers
- Founded: 1988
- Arena: Fortnox Arena
- Capacity: 1,600
- Coach: Jyri Korsman
- League: Swedish Super League
- Championships: Svenska Cupen= 1
Home colors	Away colors

The Växjö Vipers, also known as Växjö IBK, are a floorball club in Växjö. The Växjö Vipers are one of Småland's most successful floorball associations that had elite teams for both ladies and gentlemen. The club has the most DM titles in Småland. Växjö IBK was founded in 1988 when Växjö Östra IK (VöIK) was formed. In 1996, the club merged with Hovshaga AIF, and the name was changed to Växjö Innebandyklubb.

The Växjö Vipers were appointed as the association of the year 08/09 by Småland's floorball association.

In 2013, The Växjö Vipers were also awarded Smålandsposten's gold medal for their sporting achievements. During the 2016/2017 season, The Växjö Vipers finished second in the Swedish Superliga final in the Globen.

The team's current coach (2023/2024) is Jyri Korsman.
