= Balrog Botkyrka IK =

Floorball club in Botkyrka, Sweden

- Founded: 1984
- League: SSL
- Championships: 1993, 1996, 2004

Balrog Botkyrka IK is a Swedish floorball team from Botkyrka, a suburb of Stockholm. Balrog is currently playing in the third tier floorball league in Sweden. They have previously played in the highest tier league - the Swedish Super League. They debuted in SSL in the 1990/91 season. Balrog won their first championships in 1993 and has after that won 2 more, in 1996 and 2004.

== Info ==
Founded: 1984
Home arena: Botkyrkahallen, capacity 1 100
Record highest attendance: 3 111 in Hovet against AIK
Uniform colors, home: Black, black
Uniform colors, away: Red, red
Main Rivals:
Swedish Championships won: 3 (1993, 1996, 2004)
Eurofloorball Cup Gold: 3 (1994, 1995,1997)
