= Maja Viström =

Swedish floorball player

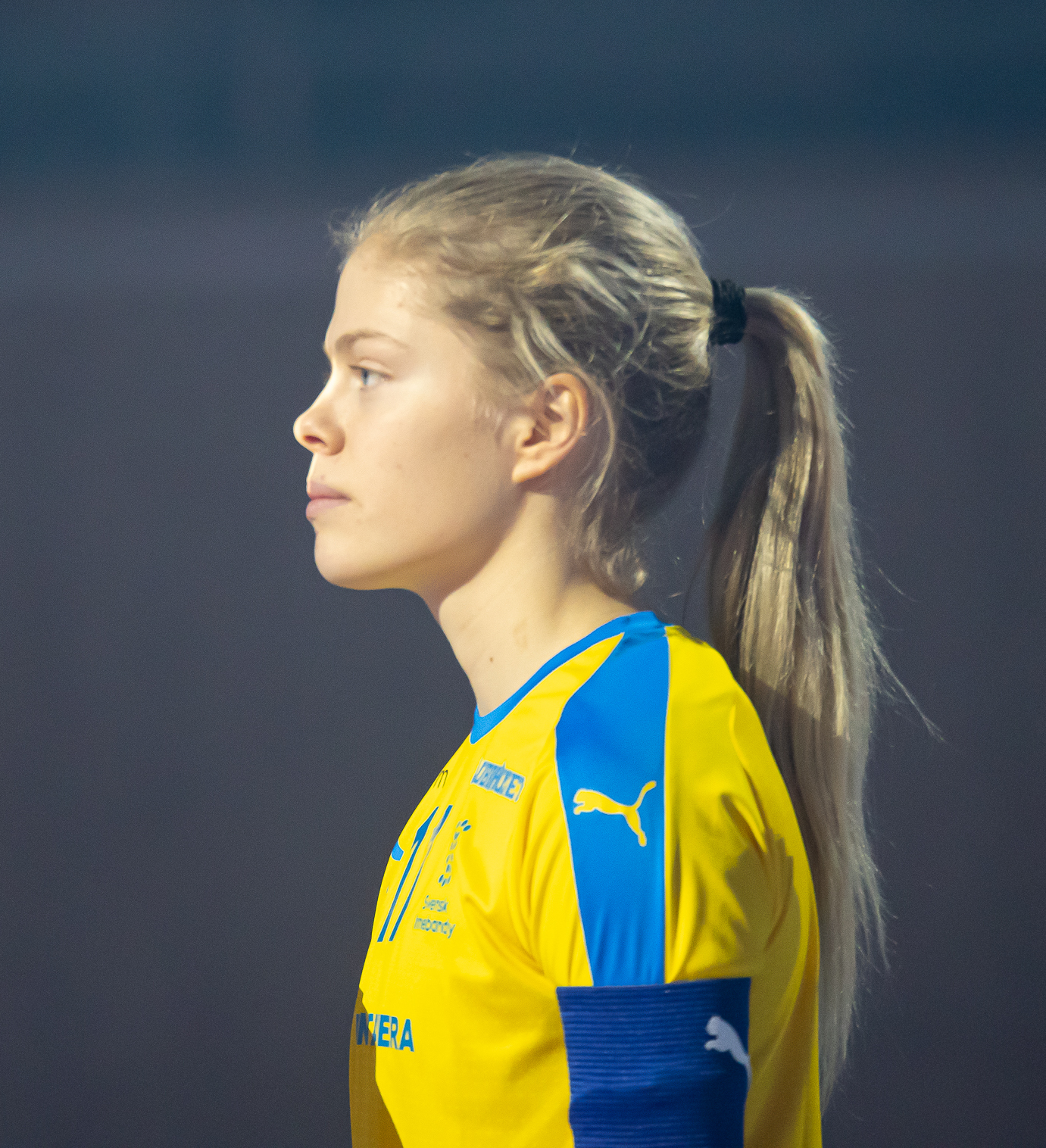
- Viström in 2020 in Sweden's under-19 team

Personal information
- National team: Sweden
- Born: 26 April 2001 (age 25) Sweden

Sport
- Sport: Floorball
- League: Swedish Super League (2017–)
- Team: IKSU (2017–2020); Team Thorengruppen (2020–)
Medal record
Women's floorball
Representing Sweden
World Games
Silver medal – second place	2025 Chengdu	Team
World Championships
Gold medal – first place	2021 Sweden
Gold medal – first place	2023 Singapore
Under-19 World Championships
Silver medal – second place	2020 Sweden

Maja Viström (born 26 April 2001) is a Swedish floorball player and national team member. She is a two-time world champion, eight-time Swedish champion, four-time Champions Cup winner, and was named the world's best floorball player in 2024. She has been playing in the Swedish Super League since 2017.

== Club career ==
In her youth, Maja Viström also played football for several years and appeared for the Sweden's under-17 national team. She started playing floorball at the age of 11 with the club Gullänget-Kroksta IBS.

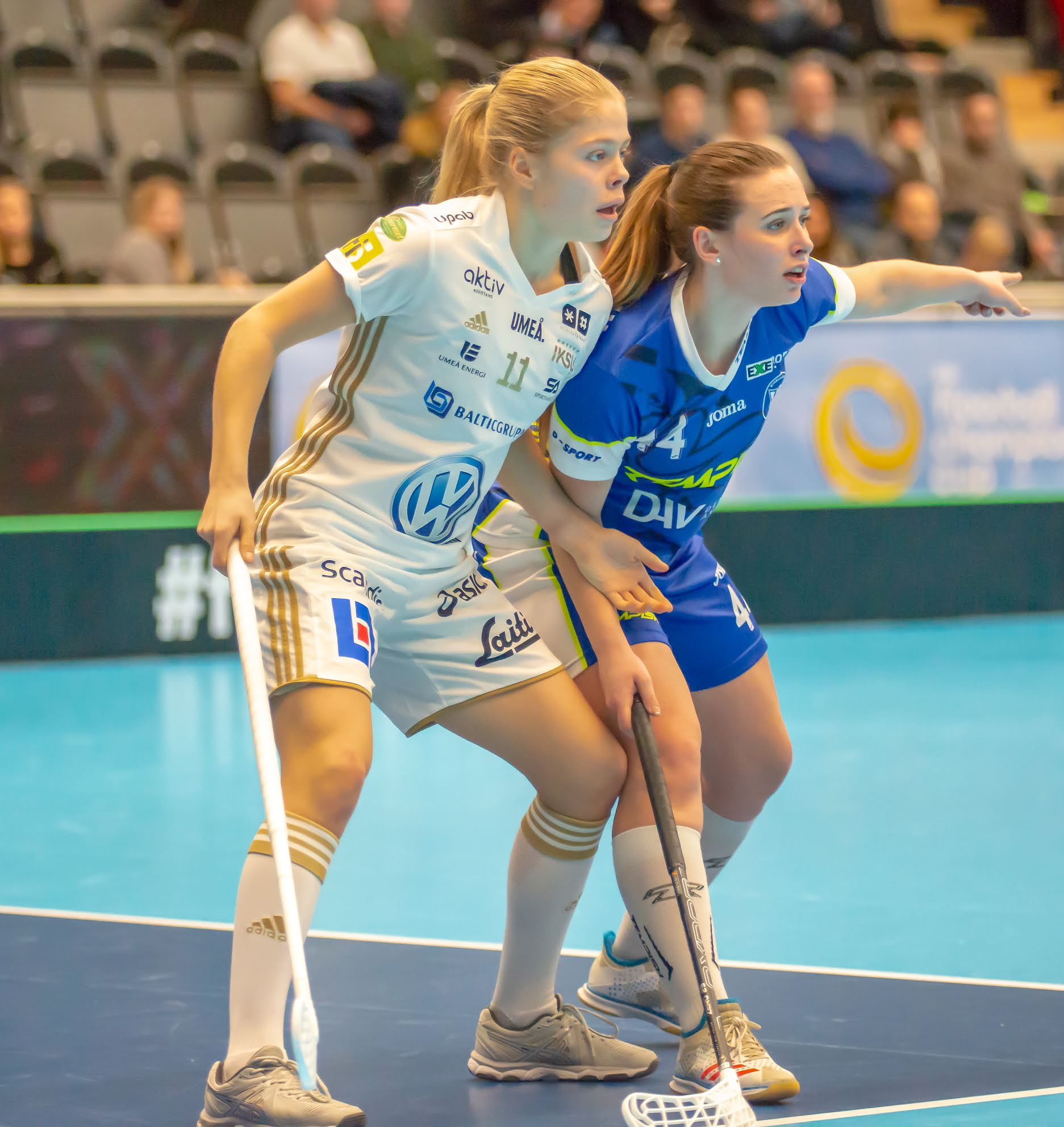
Viström (left) playing for IKSU in the 2019 Champions Cup final against 1. SC Vítkovice.

From the 2017–18 season, Viström began playing in the Swedish Super League for IKSU. In her first year, she won the championship title and later claimed gold in the Champions Cup. They secured another league title in the 2019–20 season.

After the 2019–20 season, IKSU was dissolved, and its team, including Viström, was taken over by Team Thorengruppen. Despite the transition, the team maintained its dominant position in the league, securing the championship title for the next six seasons between 2021 and 2026. Viström scored the game-winning goal in the finals of both 2022 and 2024. Thorengruppen also won the Champions Cup in 2023, 2024 and 2026 and claimed the Swedish Cup four times. In the absence of team captain Emelie Wibron, Viström repeatedly stepped in as her replacement.

== International career ==
As captain, Viström led the Swedish under-19 national team to a silver medal at the 2020 U-19 World Championships, where she was named to the All-star team.

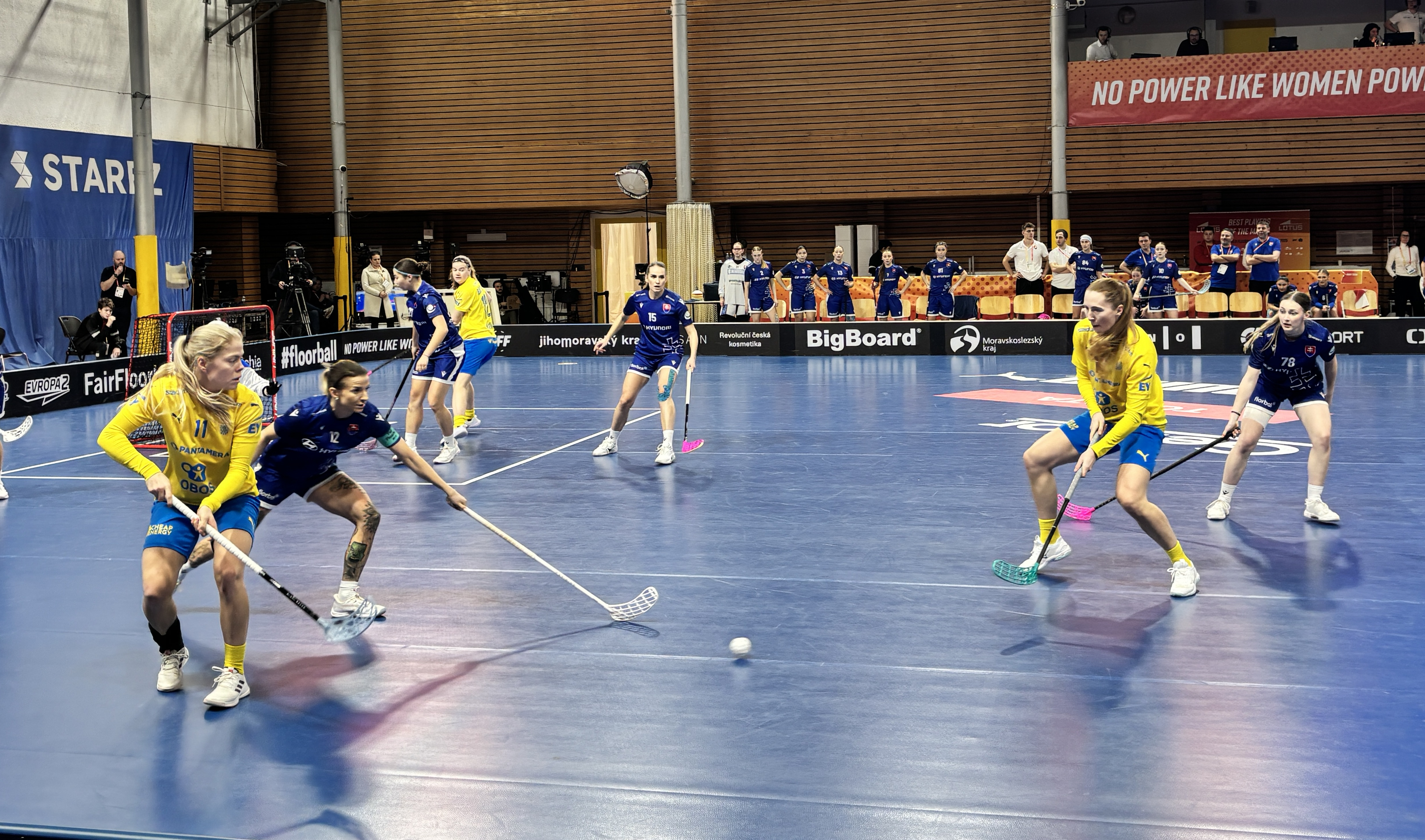
Viström (left) at 2025 World Championships

Viström made her debut for the Swedish women's national team at the Euro Floorball Tour in October 2021 in a match against the Czech Republic, where she scored two goals. She played in her first World Championship later that year, assisting her club teammate Emelie Wibron on the game-winning goal in overtime during the final and was named the player of the match. At the next championship in 2023, Sweden defended their gold medal, with Viström contributing two goals and an assist in the final, once again earning the title of the most valuable player of the match.

At the inaugural women's tournament at the 2025 World Games, they lost with the Swedish team in the final, marking their first defeat in a major international match since 2005. At the championship that same year, they lost already in the semi-finals and ultimately finished without a medal for the first time in history.

Year	Team	Event	Result
2020	Sweden U-19	WFC U-19	2nd place, silver medalist(s)
2021	Sweden	WFC	1st place, gold medalist(s)
2023	Sweden	WFC	1st place, gold medalist(s)
2025	Sweden	WG	2nd place, silver medalist(s)
2025	Sweden	WFC	4th

== Awards ==
In 2024, Viström was named the world's best floorball player in a poll conducted by Innebandymagazinet magazine. She also ranked among the top players in 2022, 2023, and 2025.

== Gallery ==
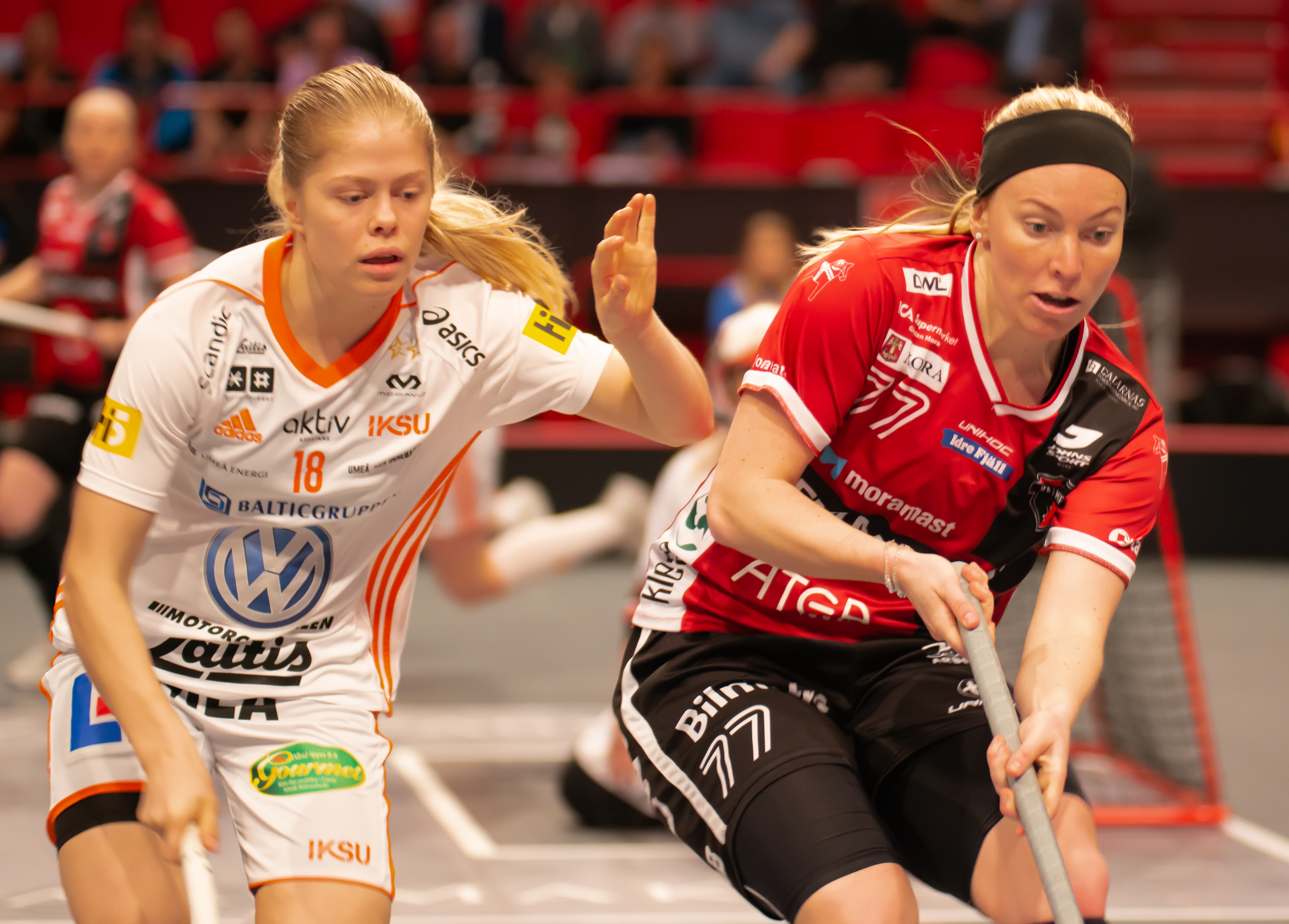
Maja Viström (left) playing for IKSU in the 2017–18 Swedish Super League final

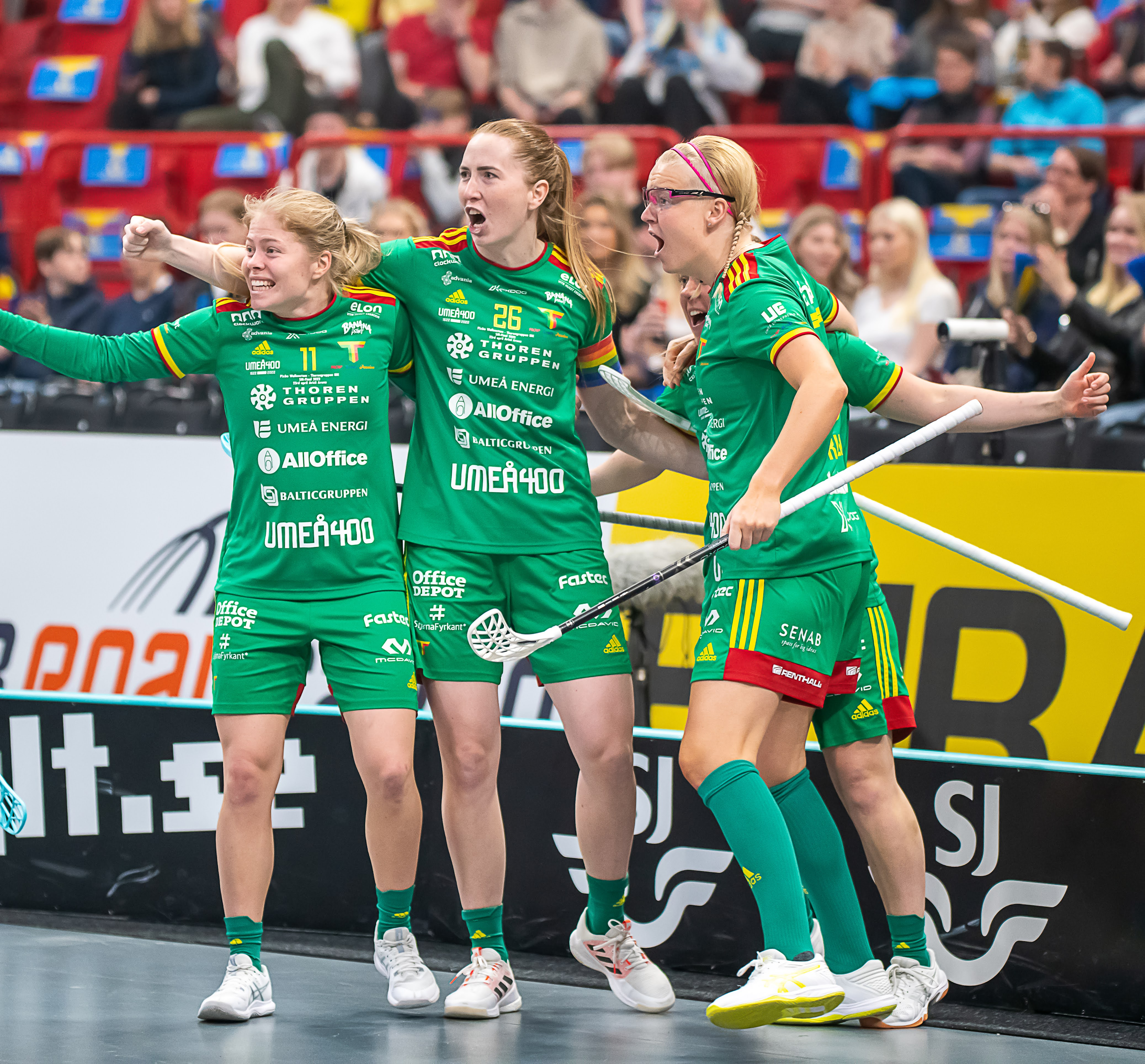
Viström (left) celebrating her first goal in the 2021–22 Swedish Super League final for Team Thorengruppen against Pixbo IBK

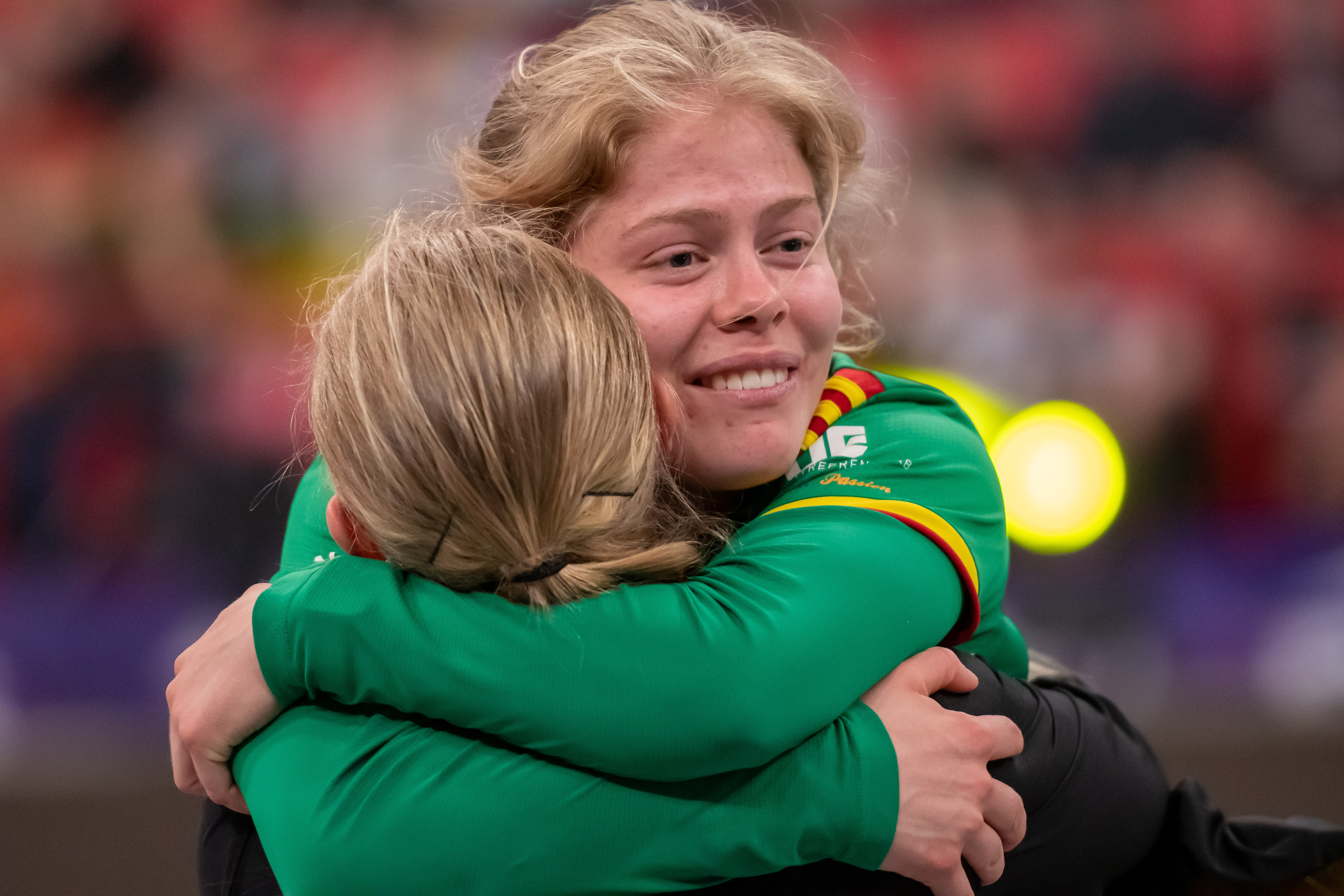
Viström celebrating Thorengruppen's victory in the 2021–22 Swedish Super League final

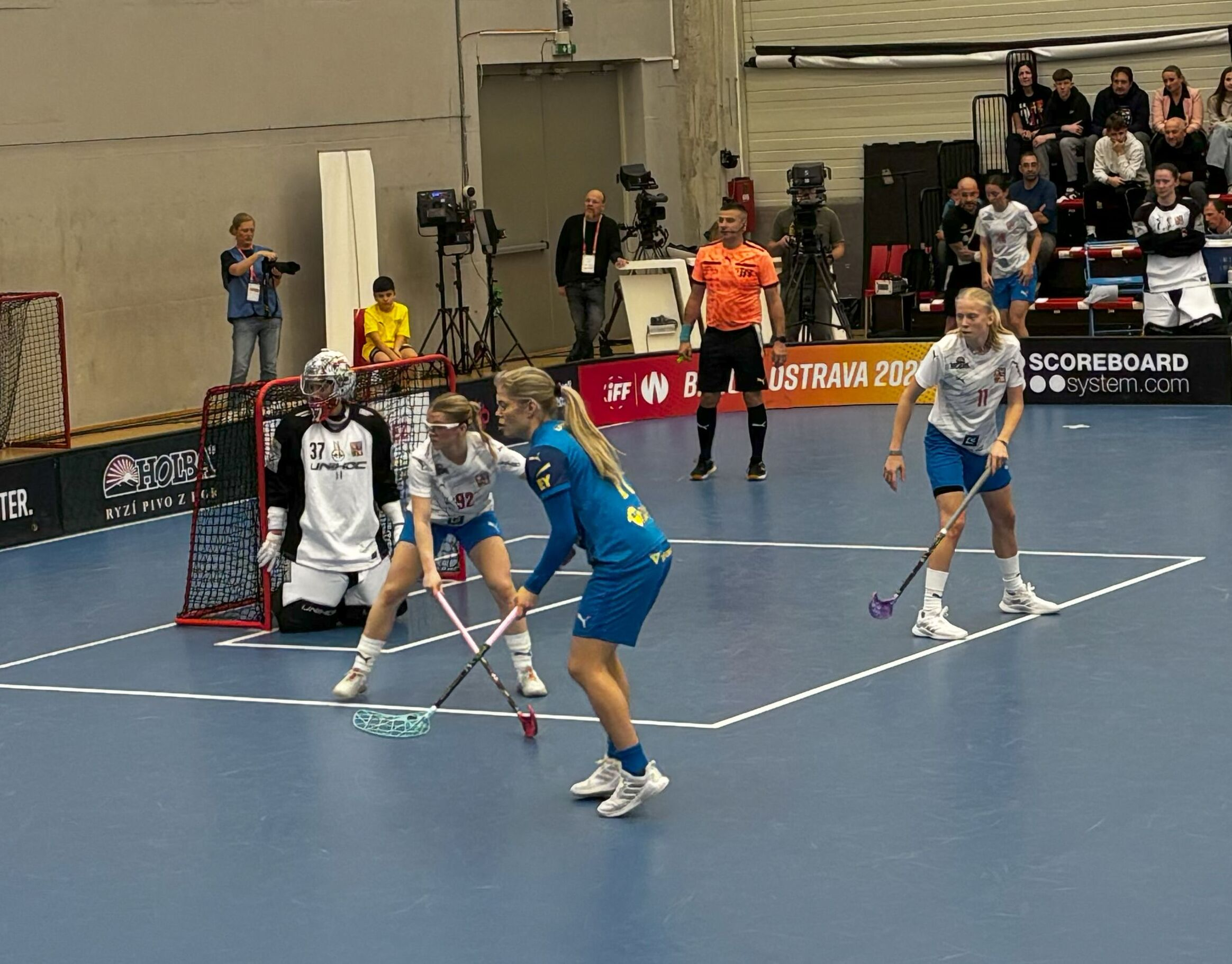
Viström (in blue) at the 2024 Euro Floorball Tour
