= 2008 Women's EuroFloorball Cup Finals =

International floorball competition

2008 Women's EuroFloorball Cup
Final round

Tournament details
- Host country: Switzerland
- Venue: 1 (in 1 host city)
- Dates: 8–12 October 2008
- Teams: 8 (from 6 countries)

Final positions
- Champions: (Sweden) IKSU Innebandy
- Runners-up: (Sweden) Balrog IK
- Third place: (Switzerland) UHC Dietlikon
- Fourth place: (Czech Republic) Děkanka Tigers

Tournament statistics
- Matches played: 8 (Note: This does not include qualification matches.)
- Goals scored: 87 (10.88 per match)
- Scoring leader(s): (Sweden) Emelie Lindström (9 points)
- All statistics correct as of 00:29, 10 October 2008 (UTC).

The 2008 Women's EuroFloorball Cup Finals took place in Winterthur, Switzerland from 8 to 12 October 2008.

The 2008 EuroFloorball Cup marks the second year in which the new name for the tournament was used (previously known as the European Cup). The tournament also marks its 16th year.

The IFF decided that the tournament would revert to its original format, and would take place during one calendar year, instead of two.

== Qualification Format ==
Since the top 4 nations at the 2007–08 Women's EuroFloorball Cup were from Switzerland, Sweden, the Czech Republic, and Norway, the top team in that country automatically qualifies, as well as the reigning champion. 5 teams in total receive automatic qualification.

Since 5 of the 8 spots are filled, the other 3 need to be decided using regional qualification. In Group C, the runners-up to the top team in Switzerland, Sweden, the Czech Republic, and Norway play for a spot in the finals. In Groups A and B, the teams are split into regions: West Europe and East Europe, respectively. The winning team in each group advances to the finals, making the total number of teams eight.

To be eligible to take part in the 2008 Women's EuroFloorball Cup, teams that take place in regional qualification must capture the national title in floorball in their country. If that team does not register, then the second-place team can register, and so forth.

== Qualifying Venues ==
Group A qualifications for Western Europe took place in Frederikshavn, Denmark from 14 to 16 August 2008.

Group B qualifications for Eastern Europe took place in Bratislava, Slovakia from 27 to 31 August 2008.

Group C qualifications took place in Helsinki, Finland from 22 to 24 August 2008.

== Championship results ==
=== Preliminary round ===
==== Conference A ====
Pos	Team	Pld	W	D	L	GF	GA	GD	Pts
1	(Switzerland) UHC Dietlikon	3	3	0	0	29	4	+25	6
2	(Czech Republic) Děkanka Tigers	3	2	0	1	20	7	+13	4
3	(Norway) Holmlia SK	3	1	0	2	13	24	−11	2
4	(Denmark) FC Outlaws	3	0	0	3	10	36	−26	0

8 October 2008
10.00

(Denmark) FC Outlaws	1:13	(Czech Republic) Děkanka Tigers
Karen Vester – 54.32		03.01 – Kristina Jilkova; 08.06 – Katerina Motkova; 11.57 – Klara Rozumova; 12.02 – Kristina Jilkova; 14.11 – Kristina Jilkova; 21.54 – Dominika Steglova; 31.18 – Magdalena Sindelova; 37.55 – Magdalena Sindelova; 55.23 – Magdalena Sindelova; 56.30 – Marina Dostalikova; 57.12 – Margarita Kalecka; 57.59 – Margarita Kalecka; 58.34 – Michaela Dudackova

Winterthur, Switzerland
Eulachhallen

8 October 2008
19.00

(Norway) Holmlia SK	1:11	(Switzerland) UHC Dietlikon
Lisbeth Pettersen – 28.26		04.13 – Anna Bürgi; 04.34 – Simone Berner; 05.09 – Martha Dubacher; 08.51 – Michelle Wiki; 10.24 – Ina Rhöös; 11.24 – Marion Rittmeyer; 35.05 – Michelle Wiki; 44.21 – Nicole Vogt; 47.47 – Simone Berner; 49.26 – Nicole Vogt; 54.27 – Anna Bürgi

Winterthur, Switzerland
Eulachhallen

9 October 2008
10.00

(Norway) Holmlia SK	11:8	(Denmark) FC Outlaws
Beate Olsen – 08.10; Lina Collberg – 08.26; Ayten Sezgin – 11.00; Lina Collberg – 27.37; Karen Farnes – 29.28; Lina Collberg – 37.26; Agnes Trolte – 42.11; Lina Collberg – 56.50; Lina Collberg – 57.36; Marie Amundsen – 58.11; Elizabeth Landsgard – 59.10		16.42 – Karen Vester; 18.13 – Karen Vester; 43.23 – Agata Kolesinska; 46.13 – Karen Vester; 46.46 – Agata Plechan; 51.56 – Agata Plechan; 58.50 – Tina Jensen; 59.17 – Karen Vester

Winterthur, Switzerland
Eulachhallen

9 October 2008
19.00

(Switzerland) UHC Dietlikon	5:2	(Czech Republic) Děkanka Tigers
Mirca Anderegg – 17.58; Karin Hjelm – 20.55; Daniela Morf – 22.48; Karin Hjelm – 30.37; Natalie Stadelmann – 48.04		12.12 – Magdalena Sindelova; 28.49 – Klara Rozumova

Winterthur, Switzerland
Eulachhallen

10 October 2008
13.00

(Czech Republic) Děkanka Tigers	5:1	(Norway) Holmlia SK

Winterthur, Switzerland
Eulachhallen

10 October 2008
19.00

(Switzerland) UHC Dietlikon	13:1	(Denmark) FC Outlaws

Winterthur, Switzerland
Eulachhallen

==== Conference B ====
Pos	Team	Pld	W	D	L	GF	GA	GD	Pts
1	(Sweden) Balrog IK	3	3	0	0	20	7	+13	6
2	(Sweden) IKSU Innebandy	3	2	0	1	20	10	+10	4
3	(Finland) SC Classic	3	1	0	2	12	12	0	2
4	(Latvia) Rubene	3	0	0	3	7	30	−23	0

8 October 2008
13.00

(Latvia) Rubene	1:9	(Finland) SC Classic
Dace Spalva – 20.31		02.32 – Henna Yläsuo; 11.22 – Annukka Virnes; 12.22 – Janna Ahonen; 27.51 – Minna Kallio; 33.01 – Nina Rantala; 42.48 – Annukka Virnes; 45.06 – Hanna Sipiläinen; 45.25 – Katri Luomaniemi; 51.17 – Irja Lahtinen

Winterthur, Switzerland
Eulachhallen

8 October 2008
16.00

(Sweden) Balrog IK	6:2	(Sweden) IKSU Innebandy
Hermine Dahlérus – 08.05; Hermine Dahlérus – 11.55; Emelie Lindström – 20.39; Emelie Lindström – 20.59; Emelie Lindström – 32.29; Emelie Lindström – 33.39		43.07 – Elin Rhöös; 53.21 – Viktoria Wikström

Winterthur, Switzerland
Eulachhallen

9 October 2008
13.00

(Sweden) Balrog IK	8:3	(Latvia) Rubene
Hanna Olsson – 11.30; Hanna Olsson – 18.39; Hermine Dahlérus – 27.36; Hanna Olsson – 29.47; Helga Karlsson – 32.42; Emelie Lindström – 43.58; Ann-Sofie Sundholm – 46.22; Sara Berg – 59.51		27.58 – Linda Lice; 37.36 – Dace Spalva; 50.32 – Edite Bankava

Winterthur, Switzerland
Eulachhallen

9 October 2008
16.00

(Sweden) IKSU Innebandy	5:1	(Finland) SC Classic
Martina Söderqvist – 32.10; Hanna Lundström – 32.32; Viktoria Wikström – 34.03; Susanne Ekblom – 58.45; Marie Häggström – 59.59		04.44 – Katriina Saarinen

Winterthur, Switzerland
Eulachhallen

10 October 2008
10.00

(Sweden) IKSU Innebandy	13:3	(Latvia) Rubene

Winterthur, Switzerland
Eulachhallen

10 October 2008
16.00

(Finland) SC Classic	2:6	(Sweden) Balrog IK

Winterthur, Switzerland
Eulachhallen

=== Playoffs ===
Semifinals
A1	(Switzerland) UHC Dietlikon	0
B2	(Sweden) IKSU Innebandy	5
B1	(Sweden) Balrog IK	7
A2	(Czech Republic) Děkanka Tigers	2

Finals
(Sweden) IKSU Innebandy	3
(Sweden) Balrog IK	2

==== Semi-finals ====
11 October 2008
16.30

(Switzerland) UHC Dietlikon	0:5	(Sweden) IKSU Innebandy

Winterthur, Switzerland
Eulachhallen

11 October 2008
19.00

(Sweden) Balrog IK	7:2	(Czech Republic) Děkanka Tigers

Winterthur, Switzerland
Eulachhallen

==== Bronze-medal match ====
12 October 2008
11.00

(Czech Republic) Děkanka Tigers	1:2	(Switzerland) UHC Dietlikon

Winterthur, Switzerland
Eulachhallen

==== Championship Match ====
12 October 2008
12.00

(Sweden) Balrog IK	2:3	(Sweden) IKSU Innebandy

Winterthur, Switzerland
Eulachhallen

=== Placement round ===
==== 7th-place match ====
11 October 2008
10.00

(Denmark) FC Outlaws	3:6	(Latvia) Rubene

Winterthur, Switzerland
Eulachhallen

==== 5th-place match ====
11 October 2008
13.00

(Norway) Holmlia SK	3:14	(Finland) SC Classic

Winterthur, Switzerland
Eulachhallen

== Notes ==
Preceded by EuroFloorball Cup; 2007–08	Current: EuroFloorball Cup; 2008	Succeeded by EuroFloorball Cup; 2009
