= 2008 Women's EuroFloorball Cup qualifying =

2008 Women's EuroFloorball Cup
Qualifying Tournaments

Tournament details
- Host countries: Denmark; Slovakia; Finland
- Venues: 3 (in 3 host cities)
- Dates: 14–31 August 2008
- Teams: 14 (from 14 countries)

Final positions
- Champions: (Denmark) FC Outlaws (Sweden) Balrog IK (Latvia) Rubene

Tournament statistics
- Matches played: 25
- Goals scored: 231 (9.24 per match)
- All statistics correct as of 17:04, 31 August 2008 (UTC).

The 2008 Women's EuroFloorball Cup Qualifying rounds took place over 14 to 31 August 2008 in three different host nations. The winner of each group advanced to the 2008 Women's EuroFloorball Cup Finals, where they had a chance to win the EuroFloorball Cup for 2008. A total of fifteen teams played in the qualifying rounds, all from different countries.

The 2008 EuroFloorball Cup marks the second year in which the new name for the tournament was used (previously known as the European Cup). The tournament also marks its sixteenth year.

The IFF decided that the tournament will revert to its original format, and will take place during one calendar year, instead of two.

== Qualification format ==
Since the top four nations at the 2007–08 Women's EuroFloorball Cup were from Sweden, Finland, Switzerland, and the Czech Republic, the top team in that country automatically qualify for the finals, as well as the reigning champion. Five teams in total receive automatic qualification.

Since five of the eight spots are filled, the other three need to be decided using regional qualification. In Group C, the runners-up to the top team in Sweden, Finland, Switzerland, and the Czech Republic play for a spot in the finals. In Groups A and B, the teams are split into regions: West Europe and East Europe, respectively. The winning team in each group advances to the finals, making the total number of teams eight.

To be eligible to take part in the 2008 Women's EuroFloorball Cup, teams that take place in regional qualification must capture the national title in floorball in their country. If that team does not register, then the second-place team can register, and so forth.

== Qualifying venues ==
Group A qualifications for Western Europe will take place in Frederikshavn, Denmark from 13 to 17 August 2008.

Group B qualifications for Eastern Europe will take place in Bratislava, Slovakia from 27 to 31 August 2008.

Group C qualifications will take place in Porvoo, Finland from 22 to 24 August 2008.

== Frederikshavn, Denmark ==
=== Group A ===
Pos	Team	Pld	W	D	L	GF	GA	GD	Pts
1	(Denmark) FC Outlaws	4	2	2	0	19	8	+11	6
2	(Spain) CUF Leganes	4	2	2	0	14	9	+5	6
3	(Netherlands) HDM	4	0	0	4	5	21	−16	0

14 August 2008
10:00

(Spain) CUF Leganes	3:1	(Netherlands) HDM
Laura Martinez – 08.05; Laura Martinez – 18.48; Laura Martinez – 56.40		36.13 – Marieke Thielen

Arena Nord

14 August 2008
20:00

(Denmark) FC Outlaws	2:2	(Spain) CUF Leganes
Line Lauridsen – 09.03; Line Lauridsen – 11.04		22.27 – Nicole Baldemark; 32.50 – Marta Lopez Fernandez

Arena Nord

15 August 2008
10:00

(Netherlands) HDM	2:7	(Denmark) FC Outlaws
Flor Thijssens – 24.32; Geertje van Ruiten – 26.17		09.15 – Stine Jensen; 19.20 – Karina Madsen; 26.51 – Sara Westberg; 27.28 – Annika Bengtsson; 41.20 – Karina Madsen; 50.38 – Karina Madsen; 51.34 – Stine Jensen

Arena Nord

15 August 2008
20:00

(Netherlands) HDM	2:5	(Spain) CUF Leganes
Flor Thijssens – 43.39; Flor Thijssens – 51.32		10.40 – Alexandra Lunar Perez; 34.10 – Maria Gomez Contrera; 41.03 – Elena Granel Roy; 47.07 – Carina Emanuelsson; 58.58 – Nicole Baldemark

Arena Nord

16 August 2008
10:00

(Spain) CUF Leganes	4:4	(Denmark) FC Outlaws
Laura Martinez – 12.19; Carina Emanuelsson – 22.43; Carina Emanuelsson – 29.46; Alexandra Lunar Perez – 34.26		04.33 – Henriette Strandby; 34.49 – Annika Bengtsson; 35.57 – Annika Bengtsson; 41.32 – Annika Bengtsson

Arena Nord

16 August 2008
20:30

(Denmark) FC Outlaws	6:0	(Netherlands) HDM
Henriette Strandby – 16.26; Line Lauridsen – 17.31; Stine Jensen – 26.46; Agata Plechan – 45.17; Agata Plechan – 46.35; Karina Madsen – 59.32

Arena Nord

== Bratislava, Slovakia ==
=== Group B ===
==== Conference A ====
Pos	Team	Pld	W	D	L	GF	GA	GD	Pts
1	(Latvia) Rubene	2	2	0	0	14	1	+13	4
2	(Estonia) SK Saku Fortuna	2	0	1	1	5	7	−2	1
3	(Hungary) Szolnok FC	2	0	1	1	6	17	−11	1

27 August 2008
15:00

(Hungary) Szolnok FC	5:5	(Estonia) SK Saku Fortuna
Anita Antal – 22.20; Nikolett Zsitnyánszki – 24.59; Anikó Vágó – 44.24; Anita Antal – 48.47; Anikó Vágó – 50.48		03.33 – Merli Kaljuve; 15.43 – Kristi Rickberg; 46.18 – Merli Kaljuve; 50.57 – Triin Pomerants; 59.21 – Katrin Saare

Jégého Arena

28 August 2008
15:00

(Estonia) SK Saku Fortuna	0:2	(Latvia) Rubene
		31.33 – Baiba Jurusa; 43.56 – Edite Bankava

Jégého Arena

29 August 2008
11:00

(Latvia) Rubene	12:1	(Hungary) Szolnok FC
Tatjana Varsa – 06.20; Zane Klabere – 07.04; Rita Sevastjanova – 30.35; Ieva Veide – 31.29; Zeltite Bankava – 32.24; Santa Liepina – 38.40; Zeltite Bankava – 45.14; Rita Sevastjanova – 45.32; Zane Klabere – 47.19; Evita Rudzite – 48.23; Baiba Jurusa – 54.43; Dace Spalva – 59.46		03.23 – Anita Antal

Jégého Arena

==== Conference B ====
Pos	Team	Pld	W	D	L	GF	GA	GD	Pts
1	(Russia) Nizhny Novgorod	3	2	0	1	22	8	+14	4
2	(Poland) UKS Absolwent	3	2	0	1	21	14	+7	4
3	(Slovakia) Dragons Ruzinov	3	2	0	1	16	15	+1	4
4	(Austria) Wiener FV	3	0	0	3	13	35	−22	0

27 August 2008
12:30

(Austria) Wiener FV	5:13	(Poland) UKS Absolwent
Irene Loos – 00.55; Ursina Jaeger – 04.18; Nora Dzuck – 12.25; Pia van Saanen – 29.04; Nora Dzuck – 56.42		07.49 – Karolina Krys; 11.46 – Martyna Rzepa; 12.11 – Klaudia Koszela; 17.05 – Marta Stachowiak; 28.25 – Marta Stachowiak; 34.54 – Karolina Dudkiewicz; 36.21 – Natalia Orkisz; 45.36 – Karolina Krys; 47.21 – Paulina Kidon; 47.40 – Agata Jankowska; 49.03 – Agnieszka Zychlinska; 54.24 – Paulina Kidon; 59.04 – Katarzyna Piosik

Jégého Arena

27 August 2008
17:30

(Russia) Nizhny Novgorod	3:4	(Slovakia) Dragons Ruzinov
Julia Sadretdinova – 05.37; Marina Boldysheva – 09.17; Oxana Matveeva – 09.40		15.49 – Zuzana Stredanska; 34.15 – Michaela Vrskova; 36.30 – Petra Tardikova; 50.57 – Michaela Vrskova

Jégého Arena

28 August 2008
12:30

(Austria) Wiener FV	2:12	(Russia) Nizhny Novgorod
Nora Dzuck – 31.31; Ursina Jaeger – 51.28		06.56 – Oxana Matveeva; 11.44 – Ksenia Svalova; 14.05 – Marina Boldysheva; 20.18 – Zoya Ovchinnikova; 23.21 – Oxana Matveeva; 27.03 – Alena Poleva; 38.14 – Marina Boldysheva; 39.49 – Marina Boldysheva; 43.08 – Marina Boldysheva; 50.22 – Julia Sadretdinova; 53.05 – Marina Boldysheva; 54.33 – Ksenia Makarova

Jégého Arena

28 August 2008
17:30

(Poland) UKS Absolwent	6:2	(Slovakia) Dragons Ruzinov
Natalia Orkisz – 09.12; Paulina Kidon – 23.05; Klaudia Koszela – 25.07; Agata Jankowska – 28.29; Agata Jankowska – 44.11; Klaudia Koszela – 45.33		43.28 – Michaela Vrskova; 53.57 – Zuzana Stredanska

Jégého Arena

29 August 2008
13:30

(Poland) UKS Absolwent	2:7	(Russia) Nizhny Novgorod
Klaudia Koszela – 13.34; Klaudia Koszela – 32.15		12.33 – Julia Sadretdinova; 27.22 – Olga Korzhavaya; 30.38 – Julia Privalova; 33.45 – Julia Sadretdinova; 45.26 – Julia Sadretdinova; 46.18 – Olga Gryazeva; 55.10 – Julia Privalova

Jégého Arena

29 August 2008
18:30

(Slovakia) Dragons Ruzinov	10:6	(Austria) Wiener FV
Emma Jurkovicová – 04.57; Zuzana Stredanska – 07.27; Alexandra Jursová – 13.19; Emma Jurkovicová – 14.04; Anna Kolesarova – 15.41; Petra Tardikova – 29.34; Veronika Jankovicová – 31.30; Zuzana Stredanska – 39.20; Anna Kolesarova – 43.32; Alexandra Jursová – 57.00		02.36 – Ursina Jaeger; 08.56 – Ursina Jaeger; 11.21 – Nora Dzuck; 16.55 – Ursina Jaeger; 33.22 – Ursina Jaeger; 46.20 – Elena Berecova

Jégého Arena

==== Playoffs ====
Semifinals
A1	(Latvia) Rubene	14
B2	(Poland) UKS Absolwent	4
B1	(Russia) Nizhny Novgorod	8
A2	(Estonia) SK Saku Fortuna	2

Finals
A1	(Latvia) Rubene	10
B1	(Russia) Nizhny Novgorod	2

===== Semi-finals =====
30 August 2008
16:00

(Latvia) Rubene	14:4	(Poland) UKS Absolwent
Zane Klabere – 10.25; Edite Bankava – 14.47; Tatjana Varsa – 25.33; Edite Bankava – 28.54; Dace Spalva – 29.04; Edite Bankava – 30.16; Dace Spalva – 36.24; Edite Bankava – 42.15; Linda Lice – 42.31; Edite Bankava – 44.04; Ieva Veide – 50.10; Dace Spalva – 51.06; Edite Bankava – 53.22; Ieva Veide – 54.34		29.11 – Martyna Rzepa; 36.46 – Agata Jankowska; 38.43 – Martyna Rzepa; 48.39 – Karolina Dudkiewicz

Jégého Arena

30 August 2008
19:00

(Russia) Nizhny Novgorod	8:2	(Estonia) SK Saku Fortuna
Own goal – 10.22; Alena Poleva – 11.53; Oxana Matveeva – 12.26; Zoya Ovchinnikova – 17.16; Marina Boldysheva – 31.56; Oxana Matveeva – 47.29; Marina Boldysheva – 51.31; Julia Sadretdinova – 52.53		16.15 – Tarja Kalliomäki; 42.37 – Merli Kaljuve

Jégého Arena

===== Championship Match =====
31 August 2008
10:00

(Latvia) Rubene	10:2	(Russia) Nizhny Novgorod
Kristine Bankava – 02.32; Santa Liepina – 06.27; Tatjana Varsa – 20.44; Unda Muravska – 26.10; Zeltite Bankava – 26.40; Dace Spalva – 29.17; Zeltite Bankava – 30.50; Santa Liepina – 33.23; Baiba Jurusa – 42.36; Guna Spalva – 59.59		08.59 – Olga Korzhavaya; 31.30 – Julia Privalova

FTVS Arena

==== Placement matches ====
===== 5th-place match =====
30 August 2008
13:00

(Hungary) Szolnok FC	8:5	(Slovakia) Dragons Ruzinov
Anita Antal – 02.30; Szilvia Adamkó – 09.26; Anikó Vágó – 10.44; Anikó Bajzáth – 19.22; Anita Antal – 30.38; Anita Antal – 38.31; Anita Antal – 45.29; Szilvia Balázs – 59.52		05.52 – Emma Jurkovicová; 13.16 – Dasa Kalmárová; 21.40 – Nina Kodhajová; 36.38 – Michaela Vrskova; 56.41 – Michaela Vrskova

Jégého Arena

- Note: A third place/bronze-medal match was not played due to a scheduling conflict

== Porvoo, Finland ==
=== Group C ===
Pos	Team	Pld	W	D	L	GF	GA	GD	Pts
1	(Sweden) Balrog IK	3	2	1	0	13	3	+10	5
2	(Finland) PSS Porvoo	3	1	2	0	14	7	+7	4
3	(Switzerland) Piranha Chur	3	1	1	1	12	12	0	3
4	(Czech Republic) FBS Bohemians	3	0	0	3	4	21	−17	0

22 August 2008
15:30

(Switzerland) Piranha Chur	1:5	(Sweden) Balrog IK
Sabrina Arpagaus – 34.36		12.37 – Hermine Dahlerus; 22.36 – Johanna Dahlin; 31.06 – Helga Karlsson; 38.14 – Amanda Wendelstig; 54.52 – Matilda Holmbom

Kokonhalli

22 August 2008
18:30

(Finland) PSS Porvoo	8:1	(Czech Republic) FBS Bohemians
Heini Laitinen – 03.28; Anu Peltokangas – 06.26; Laura Karjula – 09.01; Simone Ryser – 20.17; Eija Pasanen – 44.47; Simone Ryser – 49.09; Simone Ryser – 54.27; Mari Manninen – 55.50		27.15 – Iveta Hyrslova

Kokonhalli

23 August 2008
14:00

(Czech Republic) FBS Bohemians	1:7	(Sweden) Balrog IK
Michaela Lingova – 13.16		14.15 – Hermine Dahlerus; 19.09 – Johanna Dahlin; 39.06 – Emelie Lindström; 42.26 – Erika Tjusberg; 48.15 – Johanna Dahlin; 51.23 – Helga Karlsson; 53.11 – Johanna Dahlin

Kokonhalli

23 August 2008
17:00

(Finland) PSS Porvoo	5:5	(Switzerland) Piranha Chur
Anu Peltokangas – 06.39; Anu Peltokangas – 13.19; Anne Toivanen – 20.59; Niina Valjakka – 31.00; Niina Valjakka – 57.35		22.34 – Seraina Ulber; 32.15 – Seraina Ulber; 41.46 – Ramona Gabathuler; 46.40 – Seraina Ulber; 50.17 – Nina Kälin

Kokonhalli

24 August 2008
12:00

(Czech Republic) FBS Bohemians	2:6	(Switzerland) Piranha Chur
Eliska Krízová – 41.25; Eliska Krízová – 43.15		39.34 – Michelle Russi; 42.18 – Seraina Ulber; 52.03 – Samira Bless; 54.22 – Samira Bless; 59.04 – Elina Kujala; 59.20 – Tanja Kornberger

Kokonhalli

24 August 2008
15:00

(Sweden) Balrog IK	1:1	(Finland) PSS Porvoo
Hermine Dahlerus – 28.49		02.22 – Niina Valjakka

Kokonhalli

Preceded by EuroFloorball Cup; 2007–08	Current: EuroFloorball Cup; 2008	Succeeded by EuroFloorball Cup; 2009
