= Emelie Wibron =

Swedish floorball player

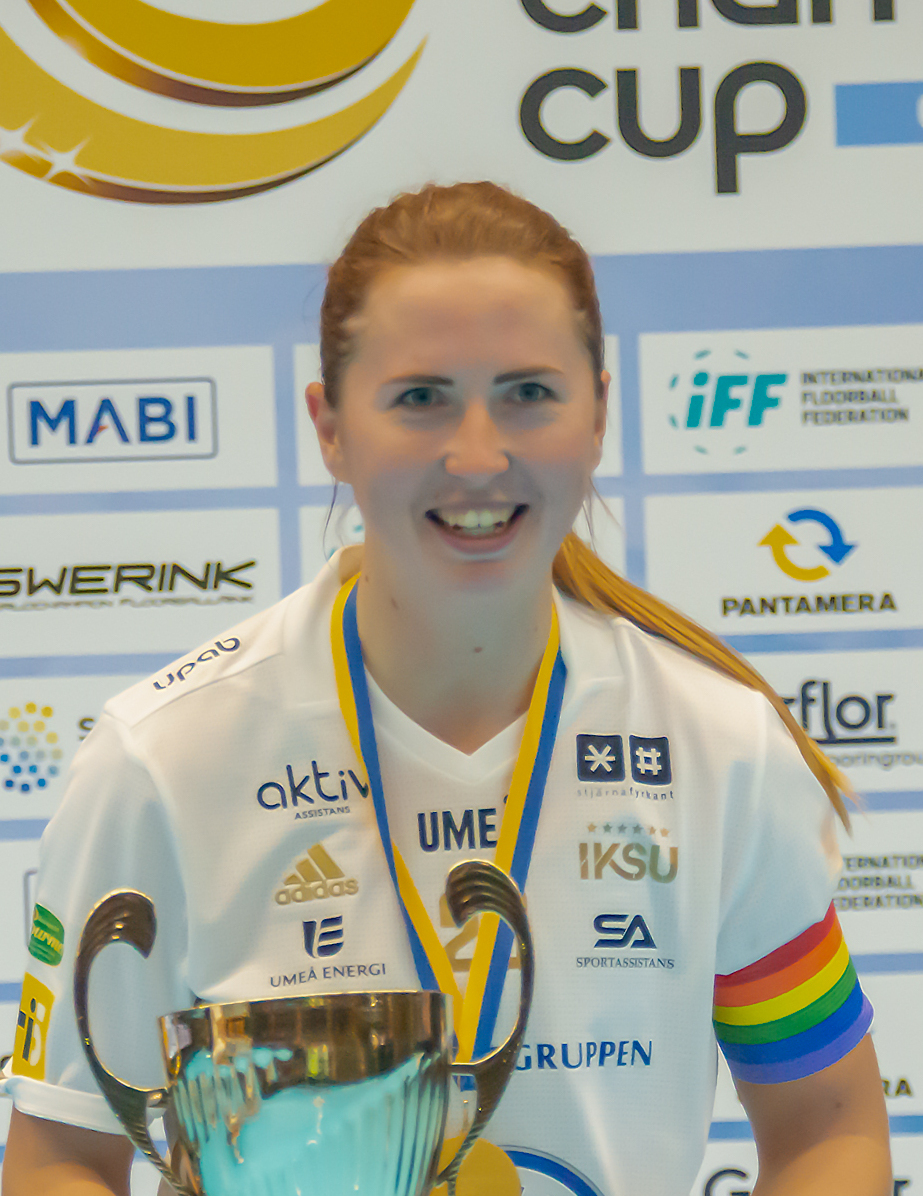
- Wibron as captain of the winning IKSU team at the 2019 Champions Cup

Personal information
- National team: Sweden
- Born: 27 February 1992 (age 34) Sweden

Sport
- Sport: Floorball
- League: Swedish Super League (2008–)
- Team: IKSU (2008–2013, 2014–2020); Pixbo IBK (2013–2014); Team Thorengruppen (2020–2026)
Medal record
Women's floorball
Representing Sweden
World Games
Silver medal – second place	2025 Chengdu
World Championships
Gold medal – first place	2009 Sweden
Gold medal – first place	2011 Switzerland
Gold medal – first place	2015 Finland
Gold medal – first place	2017 Slovakia
Gold medal – first place	2019 Switzerland
Gold medal – first place	2021 Sweden
Gold medal – first place	2023 Singapore
Under-19 World Championships
Silver medal – second place	2008 Poland
Gold medal – first place	2010 Czech Republic

Emelie Wibron (born 27 February 1992) is a retired Swedish floorball player and national team member. She is a seven-time world champion, record ten-time Swedish champion, eight-time Champions Cup winner, and was named the world's best floorball player in 2022. She played in the Swedish Super League from 2008 to 2026.

== Club career ==
=== Youth ===
In her youth, Wibron played football, where she was also introduced to floorball during training, which gradually became her main sport. She initially played for the local team Sundsvalls IBF, for which she competed in the second-highest league in her final year there. In 2007, at the age of 15, she moved to Umeå to study at a sports gymnasium, where she competed for its club RIG Umeå IBF. A year later, she began playing for the local club IKSU in the top Swedish league.

=== IKSU ===
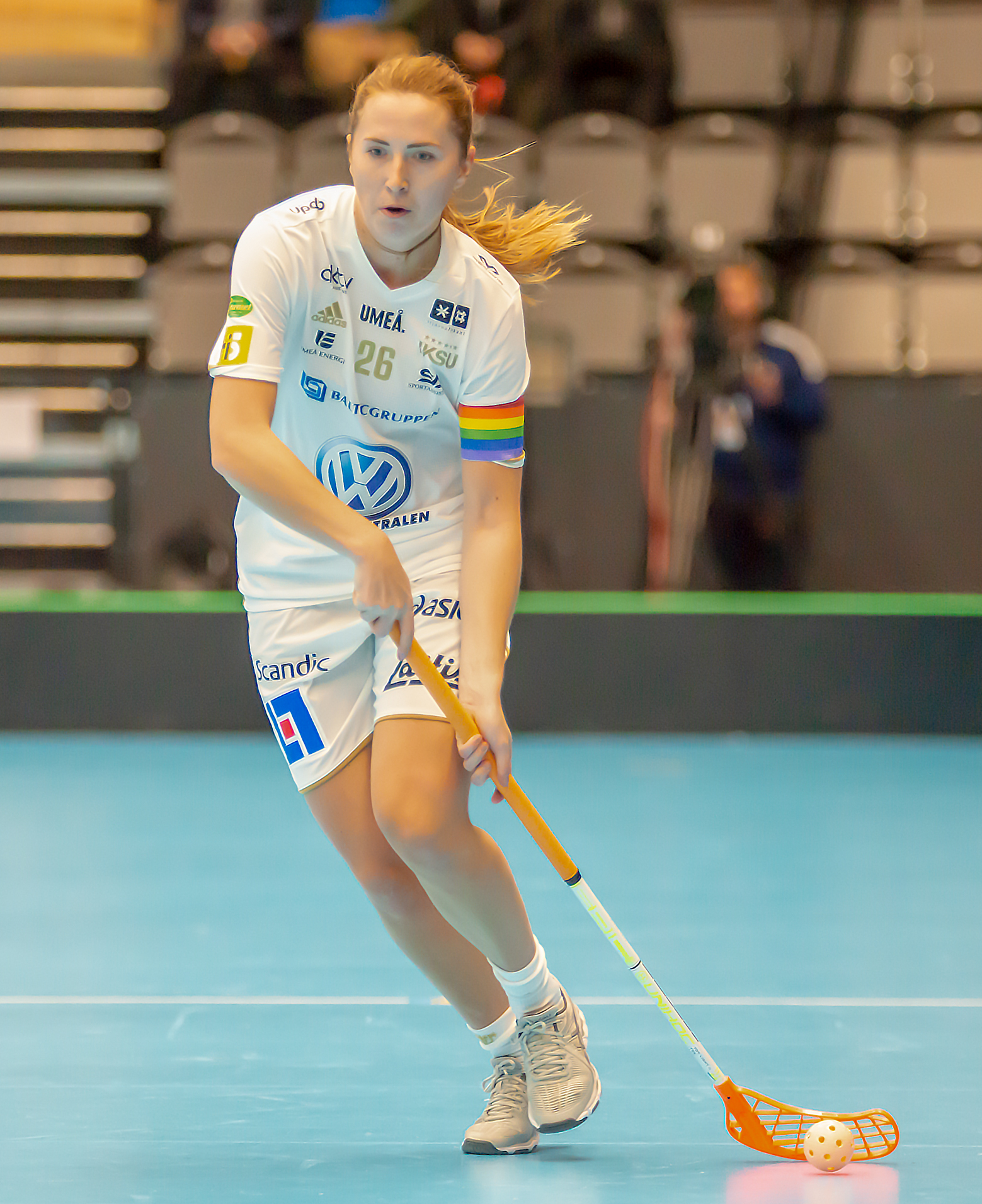
Wibron playing as captain of IKSU in the final of the 2019 Champions Cup

During her first spell at IKSU, she played for the team for five years. In the 2011–12 season, they won the gold medal, with Wibron herself scoring two goals in the final. In addition, during this period they earned three silvers. Moreover, in 2009 and 2010 they twice won the EuroFloorball Cup, and in 2012, under the new format, the Champions Cup. In 2013, she signed a three-year contract with Pixbo IBK, but after just one season she returned to IKSU.

After reuniting with the team, she moved from her original defensive position to offense. In 2016, she extended her contract with IKSU for another ten years, and in the following four seasons won three more league titles, as well as two more Champions Cup gold medals in 2017 and 2019. She also became the team captain. In total, she played 10 seasons for IKSU.

=== Thorengruppen ===
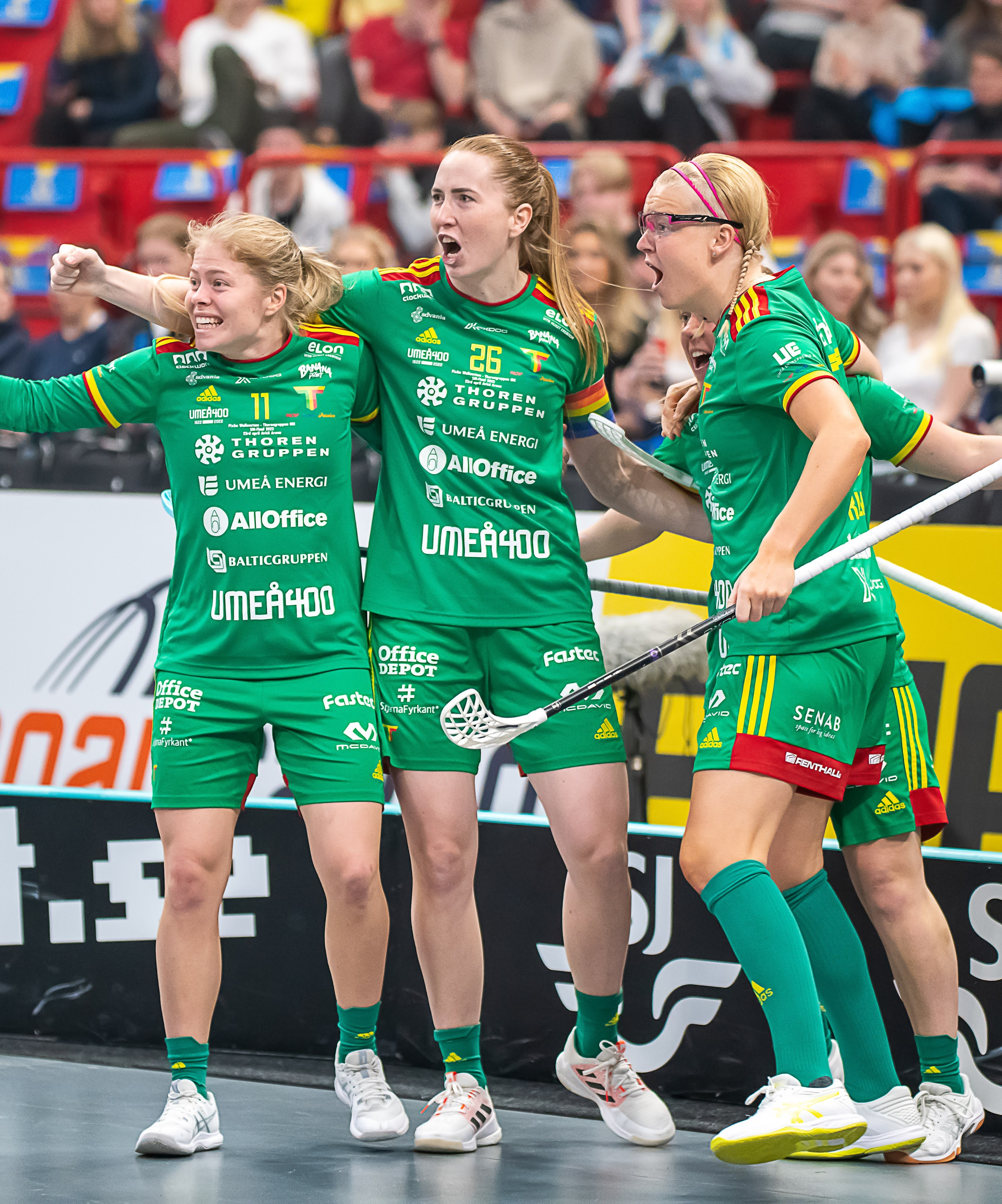
Wibron (center) as captain of Team Thorengruppen celebrating a goal in the final of the 2021–22 Swedish Super League

After the COVID-19 season of 2019–20, despite winning the league, IKSU was dissolved due to financial reasons, and its team was taken over by the club Team Thorengruppen, where Wibron continued in her role as captain. She spent much of her first season with Thorengruppen away from the game due to pregnancy and meternity leave, but she returned for the playoffs and helped the club win its first championship title. Their dominant position in the league continued, confirmed by defending the gold medal in the following five seasons. In the first three of those, between 2021 and 2024, Wibron was each time the league's top scorer with more than 80 points. Thorengruppen also won the Champions Cup in 2023, 2024 and 2026. They won the Swedish Cup four times as well.

In 2025, Wibron surpassed the historical record of 770 points held by Anna Wijk in the all-time scoring of the Swedish Super League. In the 2026 Superfinal, she scored three goals, including the game-winner, and concluded her career by securing a treble and a record tenth championship title.

== International career ==
Wibron played for the Swedish under-19 national team at two World Championships, in 2008 and 2010. At both tournaments she was named to the All-Star Team, and at the second one, Sweden won the gold medal.

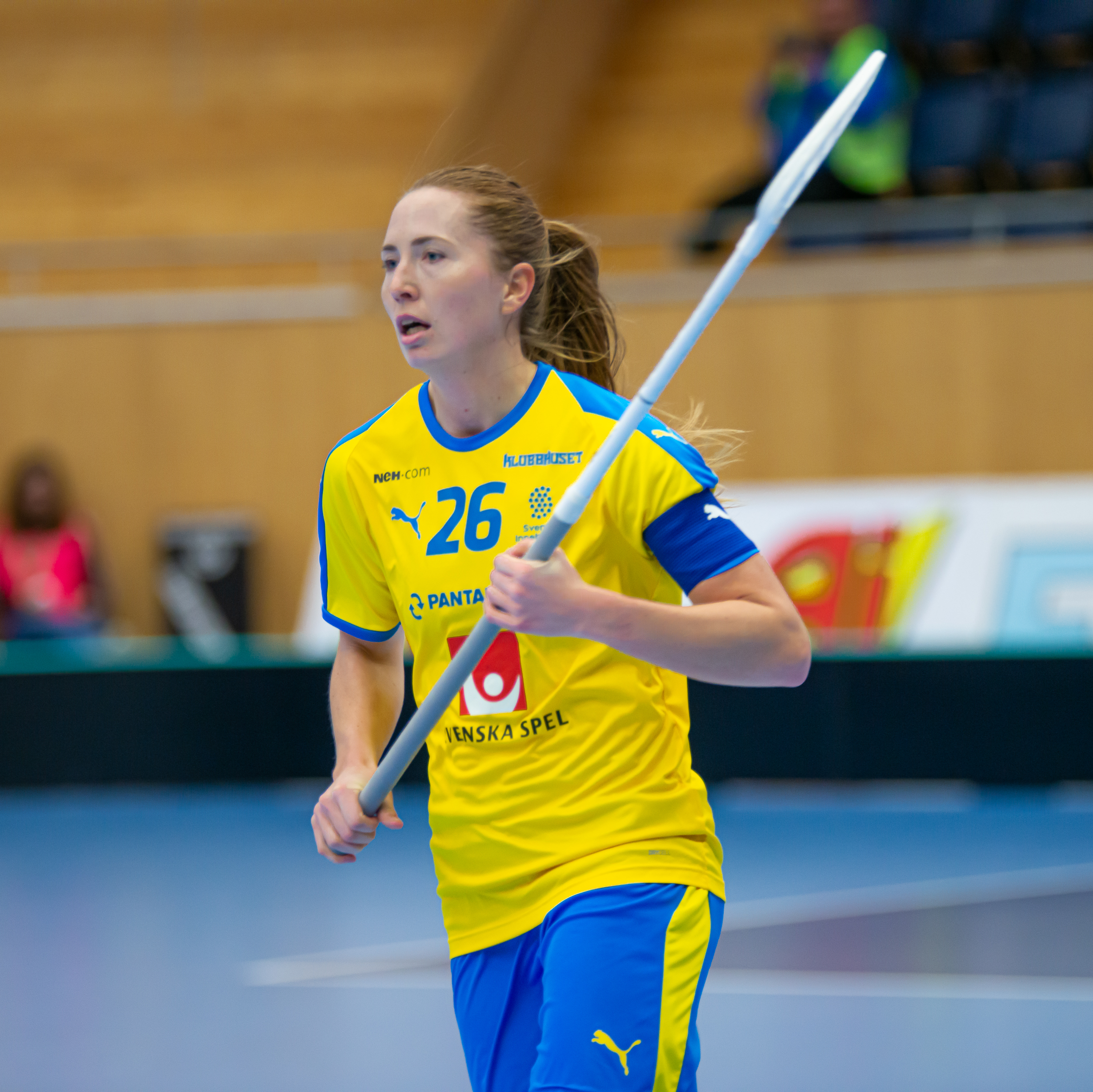
Wibron playing for the national team in a friendly match in 2020

She first played for the women's national team at the World Championship in 2009 at the age of 17, where she won her first title. In the final, she recorded one assist. At the next championships (also victorious), she was named to the All-Star Team. Surprisingly, she was not selected for the 2013 World Championships. However, she returned to play at the next six championships between 2015 and 2025. Sweden defended the gold medal at the first five of those appearances. At the 2021 championships final, she scored the winning goal in overtime. She also registered points in the finals of the 2015 and 2017 championships. At the latter, as the tournament's second-highest scorer, she was again named to the All-Star Team and was selected as the Most Valuable Player. She was selected for the All-Star Team again at the following championships. At the first women's tournament at the World Games in 2025, the Swedish team lost in the finals, their first major international match loss since 2005. At the World Championship later that same year, they lost in the semi-finals and ultimately finished without a medal for the first time in history.

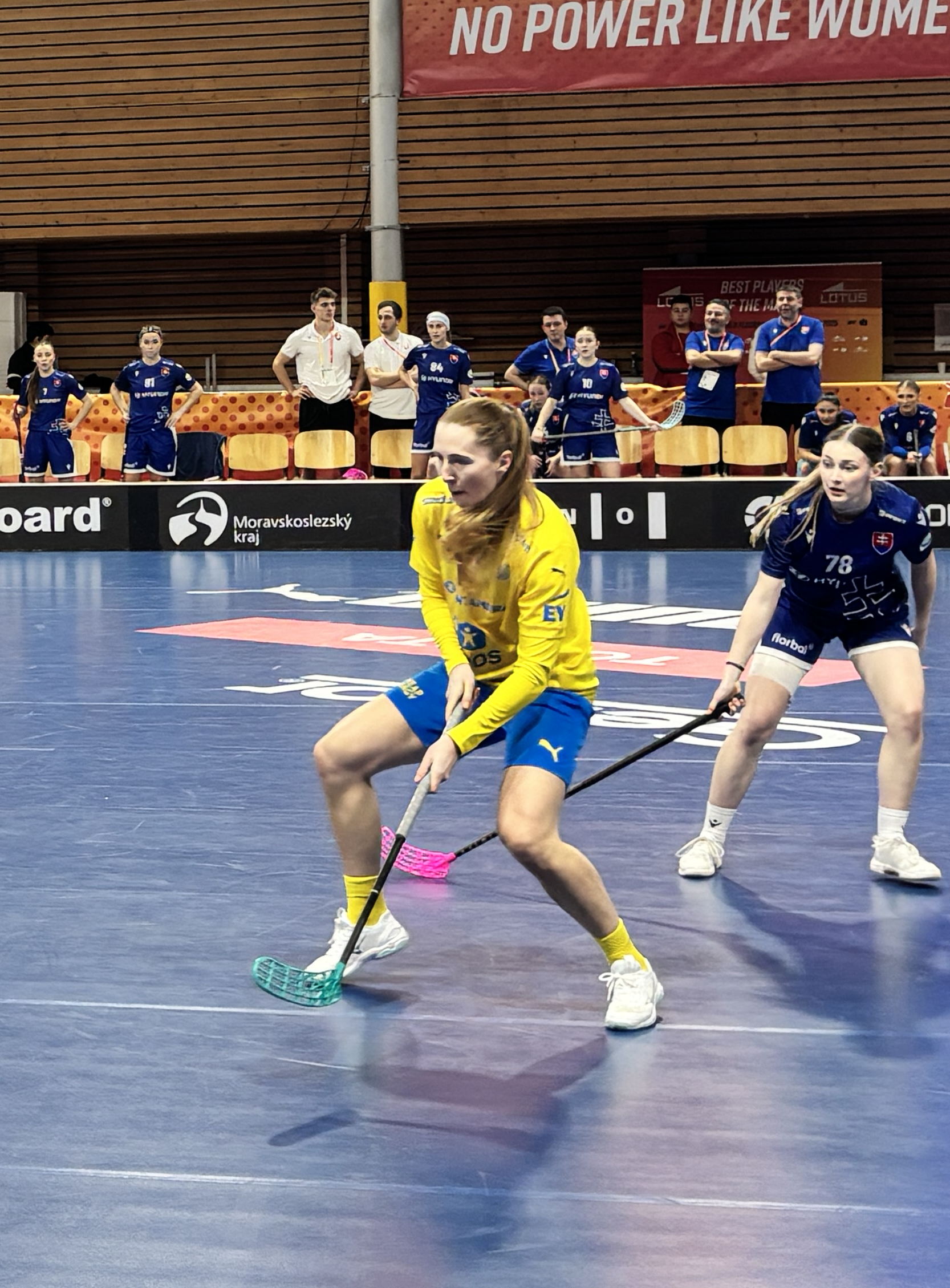
Wibron at 2025 World Championships

In 2021, Wibron became the first Swedish player to score 100 goals for the national team. At the World Championship the same year, she broke Isabell Krantz's record with 111 international appearances. During the 2025 championship, she became the highest-scoring player in the history of the World Championship, becoming the first to break the 100-point mark.

Year	Team	Event	Result
2008	Sweden U-19	WFC U-19	2nd place, silver medalist(s)
2009	Sweden	WFC	1st place, gold medalist(s)
2010	Sweden U-19	WFC U-19	1st place, gold medalist(s)
2011	Sweden	WFC	1st place, gold medalist(s)
2015	Sweden	WFC	1st place, gold medalist(s)
2017	Sweden	WFC	1st place, gold medalist(s)
2019	Sweden	WFC	1st place, gold medalist(s)
2021	Sweden	WFC	1st place, gold medalist(s)
2023	Sweden	WFC	1st place, gold medalist(s)
2025	Sweden	WG	2nd place, silver medalist(s)
2025	Sweden	WFC	4th

== Awards ==
In 2022, Wibron was named the world's best floorball player in a poll conducted by Innebandymagazinet magazine. In 2012, 2017, and 2018 she finished second in the voting.

She was named the best Swedish female player in 2019, 2022, and 2023. In the Swedish Super League, she was chosen as the best defender in 2012 and 2015, and as the best forward in 2016, 2022, and 2023.
