= Kloten-Dietlikon Jets =

Swiss floorball club

- Founded: 2018
- League: Women: Unihockey Prime League; Men: Unihockey Prime League
- Championships: Women: Unihockey Prime League (12 titles: 2003, 2006–2009, 2017, 2019, 2021–2025); Euro Floorball Cup (2007 and 2008); Men: National League A (1986)

Kloten-Dietlikon Jets is a floorball club based in the Swiss cities of Kloten and Dietlikon. The club was founded in 2018 through the merger of Kloten-Bülach Jets and UHC Dietlikon.

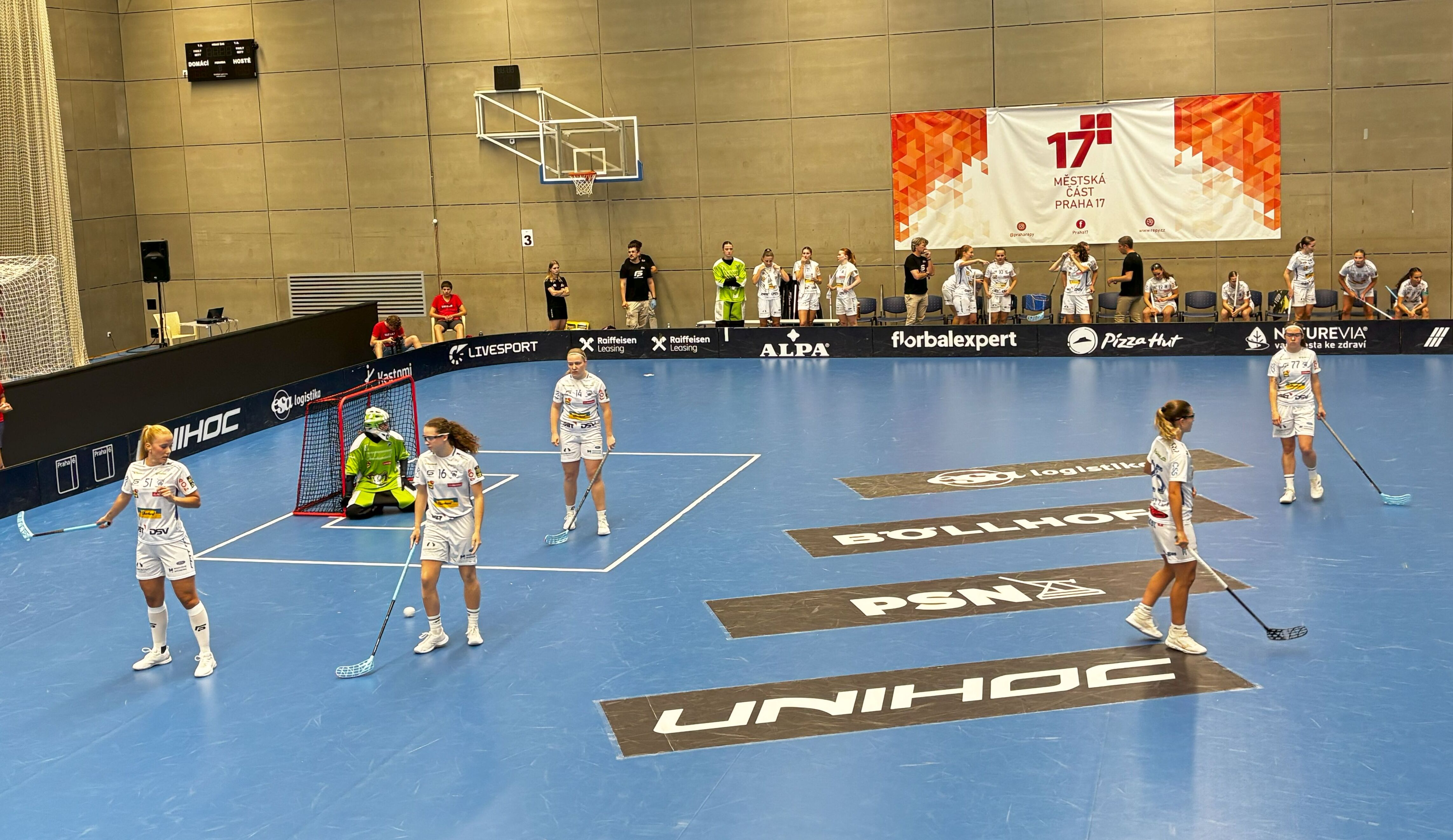
Kloten-Dietlikon Jets players in 2025–26 Champions Cup quarterfinal match

The women's team competes in the Unihockey Prime League, the top Swiss league, continuing the legacy of its predecessor, UHC Dietlikon. The Jets have won championship titles in the 2018–19 season and five consecutive seasons from 2020–21 to 2024–25. They have also claimed the Swiss Cup in 2019, 2022, and 2024, and Supercup four times, last in 2025. UHC Dietlikon previously won six championship titles in 2003, 2006 to 2009, and 2017, along with eight Swiss Cup trophies and two Supercups. In 2007 and 2008, the team became only the second Swiss club to win the Euro Floorball Cup. Combined, Kloten-Dietlikon rank as the second most successful Swiss women's floorball club with 12 league titles.

The men's team also competes in the Unihockey Prime League, the highest Swiss competition, to which they returned in 2026. Both UHC Dietlikon and the predecessor of Kloten-Bülach Jets, UHC Giants-Kloten, played in the top Swiss men's league from its inception in 1983. Giants won the league title in 1986, and their successor, Jets, claimed the Swiss Cup in 2001. Jets were relegated to National League B in 2006 but earned promotion back to the top division in the 2009–10 season, where they remained until 2019, when they were relegated again already after the merger.

== Women's team ==
=== Recent seasons ===
Season	Rank	Note
2018–19	1st	Champions – defeated Piranha Chur in final
2019–20	—	Season ended at 2–1 in games in the playoff quarterfinals against Red Ants Winterthur
2020–21	1st	Champions – defeated Skorpion Emmental Zollbrück in final
2021–22	1st	Champions – defeated Piranha Chur in final
2022–23	1st	Champions – defeated Skorpion Emmental Zollbrück in final
2023–24	1st	Champions – defeated Zug United in final
2024–25	1st	Champions – defeated Zug United in final
2025–26	2nd	Runner-up – lost to Wizards Bern Burgdorf in final

=== Champions Cup (UHC Dietlikon) ===
Women's team celebrates their 2007-08 EuroFloorball Cup

Tournament	Rank	Note
2003–04 European Cup	3rd	3rd place – defeated (Czech Republic) FBC Liberec
2006–07 European Cup	1st	Champions – defeated (Sweden) IKSU in final
2007–08 EuroFloorball Cup	1st	Champions – defeated (Sweden) IKSU in final
2008 EuroFloorball Cup	3rd	3rd place – defeated (Czech Republic) HFK Děkanka
2009 EuroFloorball Cup	2nd	Runner-up – lost to (Sweden) IKSU in final
2017 Champions Cup	4th	Semifinal loss to (Finland) Classic

=== Champions Cup ===
Tournament	Rank	Note
2020 Champions Cup	2nd	Runner-up – lost to (Sweden) Täby FC in final
2023 Champions Cup	4th	4th place – lost to (Czech Republic) FBC Ostrava in 3rd place match
2024 Champions Cup	—	Semifinal loss to (Sweden) Pixbo IBK
2025 Champions Cup	—	Quarterfinal loss to (Czech Republic) Florbal Chodov
2026 Champions Cup	—	Quarterfinal loss to (Czech Republic) Tatran Střešovice

== Men's team ==
=== Recent seasons (Kloten-Bülach Jets) ===
Season	Rank	Note
2016–17	8th	Quarterfinal loss to SV Wiler-Ersigen
2017–18	12th	Won relegation play-off against Unihockey Basel Regio

=== Recent seasons ===
Season	Rank	Note
2018–19	12th	Lost relegation play-off to Ad Astra Sarnen
Between 2019 and 2026, the team played in the National League B.
