= 2025–26 Women's Floorball Champions Cup =

European floorball tournament

Women's Floorball Champions Cup
- 2025–26

Tournament information
- Sport: Floorball
- Dates: 23 August 2025–24 January 2026
- Teams: 8

Final positions
- Champions: (Sweden) Thorengruppen IBK (3rd title)
- Runner-up: (Czech Republic) 1. SC Vítkovice

Tournament statistics
- Matches played: 13

The 2025–26 Women's Floorball Champions Cup was the 31st edition of the premier competition for floorball clubs and the third in a format for league and cup winners.

The Swedish Thorengruppen IBK defeated the Czech champion 1. SC Vítkovice in the final. It was Thorengruppen's third title, having last won in 2024. For Vítkovice, it was their third silver medal, remaining the only Czech women's team to have reached the final.

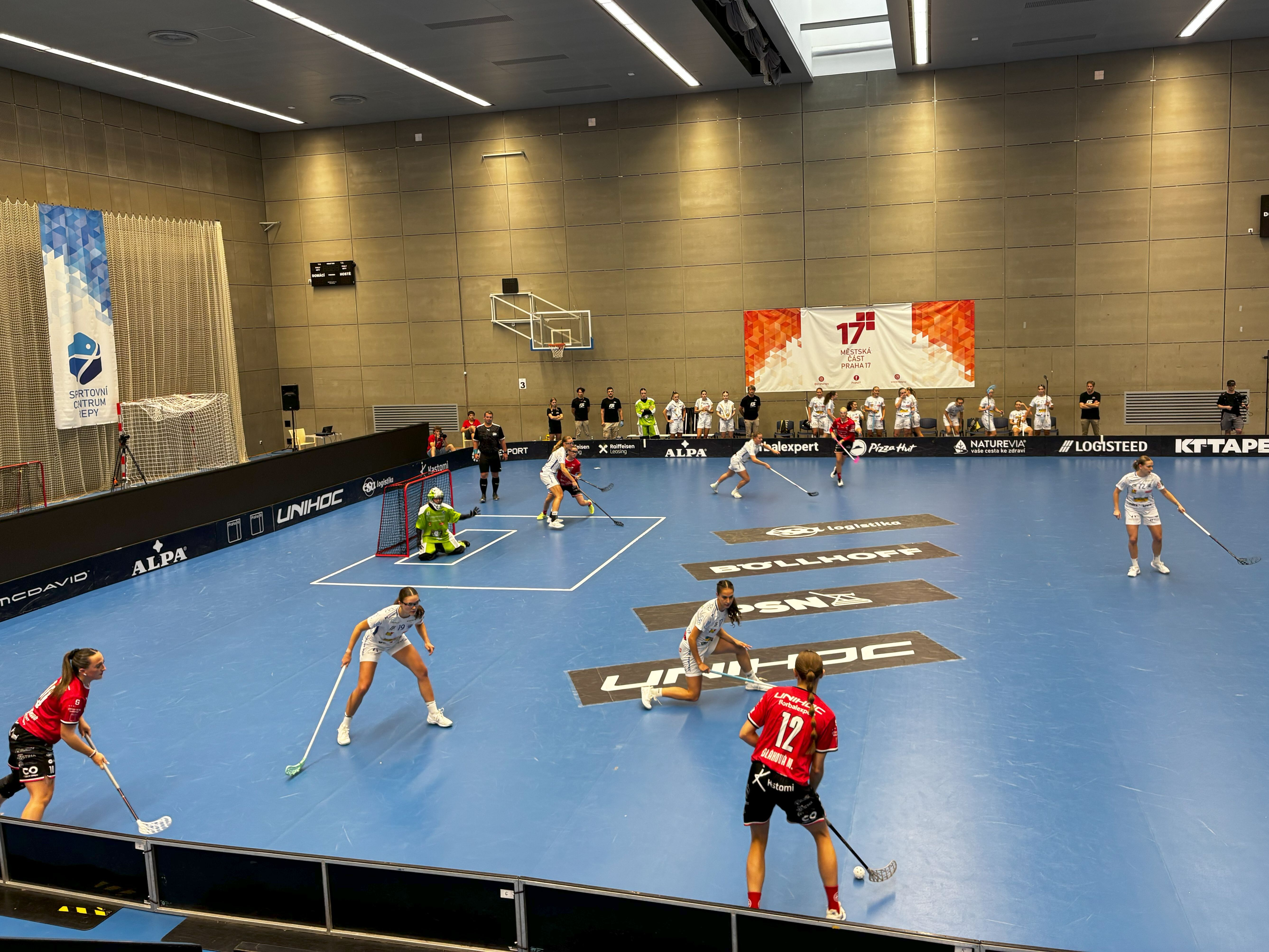
Quarterfinal match between Tatran Střešovice (in red) and Kloten-Dietlikon Jets (in white) in Prague

== Format ==
The league champions and cup winners from four countries take part. If the same team wins the league and the cup in their country, the second-place team in the league also takes part.

For quarterfinals the eight teams are divided into two conferences based on their geographical location. The Swedish and Finnish teams take part in the Northern conference; the clubs from the Czech Republic and Switzerland play in the Southern conference. The four winners advance to the semifinals. Quarterfinals and semifinals are played in a home and away format. If a round is undecided after the two matches, the second match is followed by an overtime. The two semifinal winners play in a final held at a centralized venue.

== Teams ==
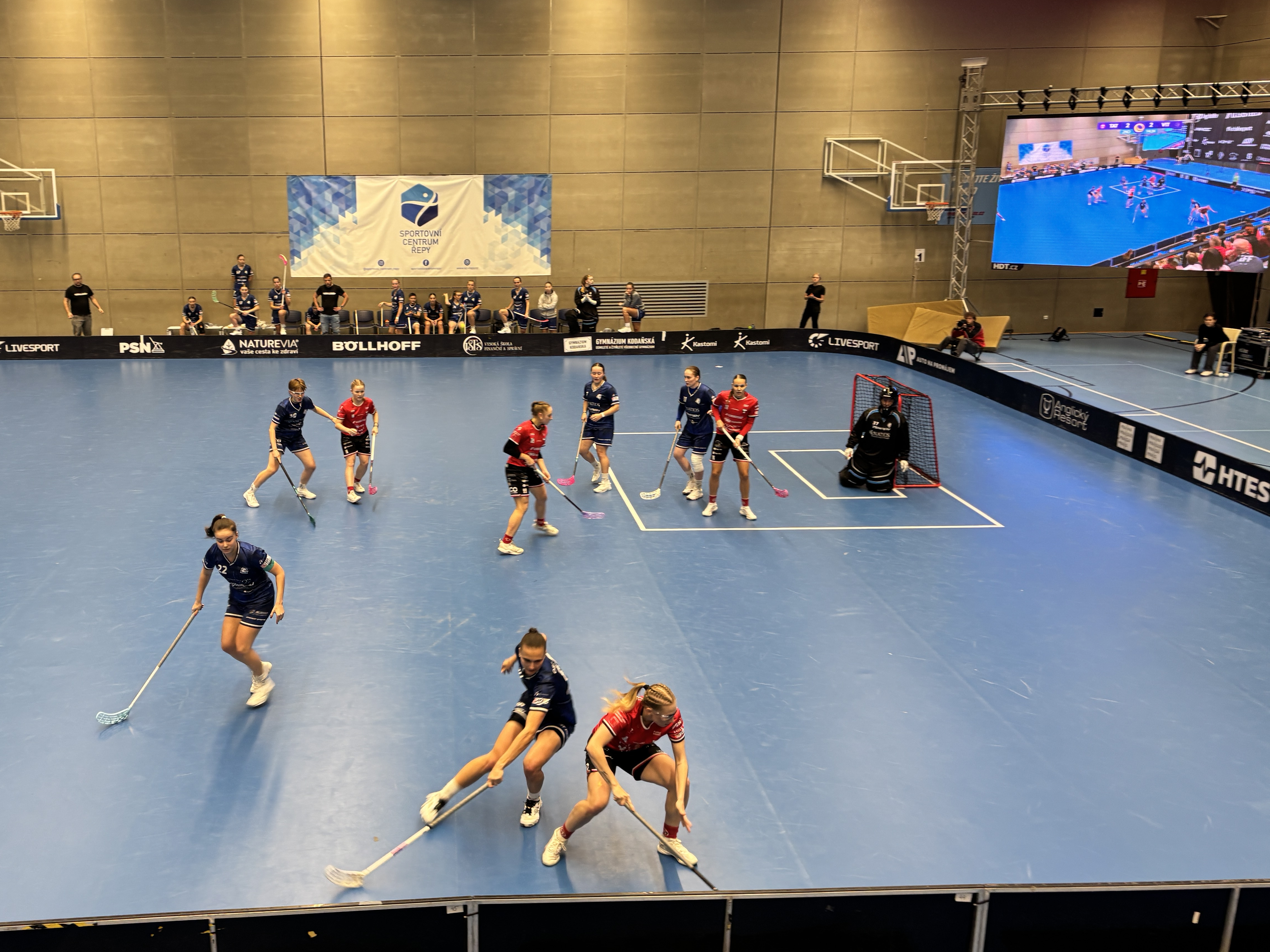
Semifinal match between Tatran Střešovice (in red) and 1. SC Vítkovice (in blue) in Prague

Location of teams of the 2025–26 Floorball Champions Cup.

Conference	Country (League)	League Winner	Cup Winner/Runner-up
Northern	Sweden (Swedish Super League)	Thorengruppen IBK	Pixbo IBK (Runner-up)
Northern	Finland (F-liiga)	Classic	TPS
Southern	Czech Republic (Extraliga žen)	1. SC Vítkovice	Tatran Střešovice
Southern	Switzerland (Unihockey Prime League)	Kloten-Dietlikon Jets	Floorball Chur United

== Tournament ==
=== Bracket ===
Quarterfinals
(Switzerland) Kloten-Dietlikon Jets	4	3	0
(Czech Republic) Tatran Střešovice	5	8	2
(Switzerland) Floorball Chur United	4	1	0
(Czech Republic) 1. SC Vítkovice	4	8	1
(Finland) Classic	3	5	0
(Sweden) Pixbo IBK	6	8	2
(Finland) TPS	3	5	0
(Sweden) Thorengruppen IBK	10	11	2

Semifinals
(Czech Republic) Tatran Střešovice	4	2	0
(Czech Republic) 1. SC Vítkovice	7	6	2
(Sweden) Pixbo IBK	2	2	0
(Sweden) Thorengruppen IBK	9	7	2

Final
(Czech Republic) 1. SC Vítkovice	2
(Sweden) Thorengruppen IBK	9

All times are local – CET/CEST, unless stated otherwise.

=== Quarterfinals ===
20 September 2025; 15:30	Tatran Střešovice (Czech Republic)	5–4 (2–2, 1–1, 2–1)	(Switzerland) Kloten-Dietlikon Jets	Sportovní centrum Řepy, Prague; Attendance: 173

Game reference

4 October 2025; 16:00	Kloten-Dietlikon Jets (Switzerland)	3–8 (0–2, 2–2, 1–4)	(Czech Republic) Tatran Střešovice	Heja Stighag, Kloten; Attendance: 244

Game reference

Tatran Střešovice won the series 0–2.

20 September 2025; 16:00	Floorball Chur United (Switzerland)	4–4 (3–0, 0–2, 1–2)	(Czech Republic) 1. SC Vítkovice	Sporthalle Fortuna, Chur; Attendance: 650

Game reference

4 October 2025; 17:00	1. SC Vítkovice (Czech Republic)	8–1 (2–1, 1–0, 5–0)	(Switzerland) Floorball Chur United	SH Sareza, Ostrava; Attendance: 152

Game reference

1. SC Vítkovice won the series 1–0.

24 August 2025; 13:00	Pixbo IBK (Sweden)	6–3 (0–1, 2–1, 4–1)	(Finland) Classic	Wallenstam Arena, Gothenburg; Attendance: 88

Game reference

30 August 2025; 16:30	Classic (Finland)	5–8 (1–2, 3–2, 1–4)	(Sweden) Pixbo IBK	Ideapark Blak Boks, Lempäälä; Attendance: 221

Game reference

Pixbo IBK won the series 0–2.

23 August 2025; 15:00 EEST	TPS (Finland)	3–10 (2–5, 0–2, 1–3)	(Sweden) Thorengruppen IBK	Vaasan Sähkö Areena, Vaasa; Attendance: 466

Game reference

24 August 2025; 12:00	Thorengruppen IBK (Sweden)	11–5 (3–2, 3–2, 5–1)	(Finland) TPS	Vaasan Sähkö Areena, Vaasa; Attendance: 536

Game reference

Thorengruppen IBK won the series 2–0.

=== Semifinals ===
28 October 2025; 18:00	Thorengruppen IBK (Sweden)	9–2 (3–0, 2–2, 4–0)	(Sweden) Pixbo IBK	Nolia Arena, Umeå; Attendance: 1,507

Game reference

13 November 2025; 19:00	Pixbo IBK (Sweden)	2–7 (0–3, 1–2, 1–2)	(Sweden) Thorengruppen IBK	Wallenstam Arena, Gothenburg; Attendance: 294

Game reference

Thorengruppen IBK won the series 0–2.

29 October 2025; 19:00	1. SC Vítkovice (Czech Republic)	7–4 (2–0, 3–2, 2–2)	(Czech Republic) Tatran Střešovice	SH Sareza, Ostrava; Attendance: 201

Game reference

12 November 2025; 19:00	Tatran Střešovice (Czech Republic)	2–6 (1–1, 1–2, 0–3)	(Czech Republic) 1. SC Vítkovice	Sportovní centrum Řepy, Prague; Attendance: 158

Game reference

1. SC Vítkovice won the series 0–2.

=== Final ===
24 January 2026; 19:15	1. SC Vítkovice (Czech Republic)	2–9 (1–4, 1–2, 0–3)	(Sweden) Thorengruppen IBK	RT Torax Arena, Ostrava; Attendance: 2,113

Game reference

== EuroFloorball Cup ==
In 2025, the EuroFloorball Cup was reinstated for the winners of competitions from countries ranked lower in the IFF ranking. The EuroFloorball Cup was held as part of the Czech Open tournament in Prague.

1st place, gold medalist(s)	(Norway) SF Grei
2nd place, silver medalist(s)	(Germany) MFBC Leipzig
3rd place, bronze medalist(s)	(Slovakia) MKŠS FBK Kysucké Nové Mesto
4	(Netherlands) UFC Utrecht
5	(Belgium) Les Renardes de La Hulpe

== See also ==
- 2025–26 Men's Floorball Champions Cup
