= Swiss Unihockey =

Governing body of floorball in Switzerland

Swiss Floorball Association
- IOC nation: SUI
- Sport: Floorball
- Official website: www.swissunihockey.ch

History
- Year of formation: 1985; 41 years ago

Affiliations
- International federation: International Floorball Federation (IFF)
- IFF member since: 1986; 40 years ago

Swiss Unihockey, formerly Schweizer Unihockey Verband, is a sports association which is representing floorball in Switzerland.

The Swiss Floorball Association organizes the Men's and Women's Unihockey Prime League, the National League B and several regional leagues.

== History ==
The Swiss floorball association was founded April 20, 1985 in Sarnen. In 1986 the Swedish, Finnish and Swiss floorball decided to found the International Floorball Federation.

== Facts ==
- Clubs: 353
- Teams: 2,264
- Licensed players: 36,469
- Referees: 1,549

== Participation and results in IFF events ==
Men's WFC	Women's WFC	Men's U19 WFC	Women's U19 WFC
2016: Registered			2016: A-division
2014: 4th	2015: 3rd	2015: 2nd	2014: 4th
2012: 3rd	2013: 3rd	2013: 2nd	2012: 2nd
2010: 4th	2011: 4th	2011: 3rd	2010: 4th
2008: 3rd	2009: 2nd	2009: 3rd	2008: 1st
2006: 3rd	2007: 3rd	2007: 4th	2006: 3rd
2004: 4th	2005: 1st	2005: 3rd	2004: 3rd
2002: 3rd	2003: 2nd	2003: 4th	
2000: 3rd	2001: 4th	2001: 2nd	
1998: 2nd	1999: 2nd		
1996: 5th	1997: 4th		

== IFF events organized by the association ==
Event	Location
2014 Champions Cup	Zurich
2012 Men's World Floorball Championships	Bern and Zurich
2011 Women's World Floorball Championships	St. Gallen
2009 EuroFloorball Cup Qualifications 2nd best teams	Langnau and Winterthur
2008 EuroFloorball Cup Final round	Winterthur
2007 Men's under-19 World Floorball Championships	Kirchberg and Zuchwil
2004-05 European Cup Final Round Men/Women	Adliswil and Zurich
2004 Men's World Floorball Championships	Kloten and Zurich
2003 Women's World Floorball Championships	Bern, Gümligen, Wünnewil
1999 European Cup Final Round Men/Women	Bern, Sarnen, Winterthur, Zuchwil
1995 Open European Championships Men/Women	Aarau, Adliswil, Jona, Gümligen, Sursee, Zurich
1994 European Cup Final Round Men/Women	
