= Team Thorengruppen =

Sports club in Umeå, Sweden

- Founded: 2005
- League: Women: Swedish Super League; Men: Swedish Super League
- Championships: Women: SSL (2020–21, 2021–22, 2022–23, 2023–24, 2024–25, 2025–26); Swedish Cup (2021–22, 2023–24, 2024–25, 2025–26); Champions Cup (2023, 2024, 2026)

Team Thorengruppen (or Thorengruppen IBK) is a Swedish sports and primarily floorball club. It was founded in 2005, is based in the city of Umeå, and is named after its main sponsor.

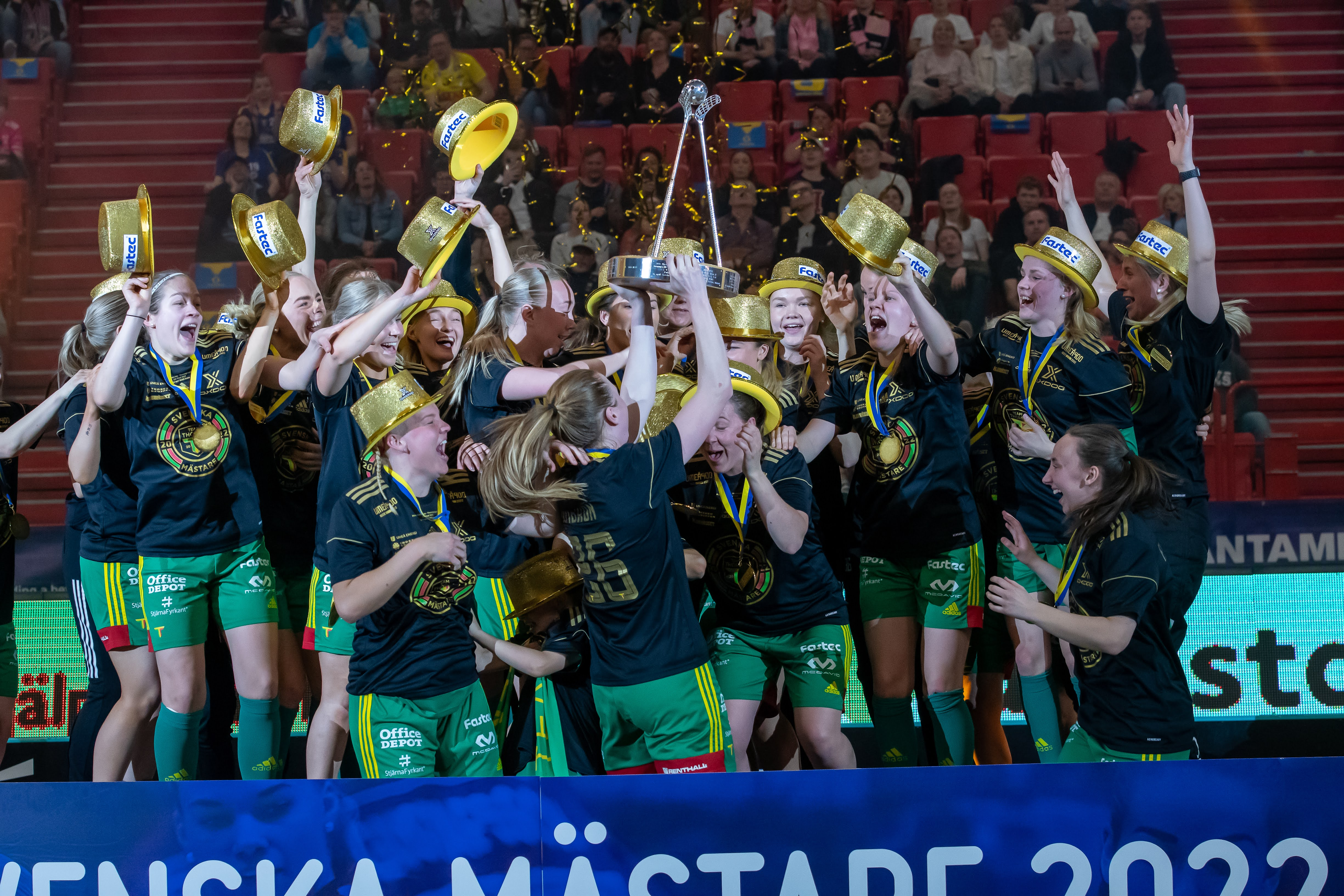
Team Thorengruppen players celebrating winning the title in the 2021–22 season

The women's team was founded in 2013 by taking over the Ersboda SK club. Since the 2020–21 season, it has played in the top-tier competition, the Swedish Super League. At the same time, it took over players from the dissolved team IKSU, also based in Umeå, the winner of the previous season and a seven-time Swedish champion overall. Since promotion, the team has won all six championship titles, three Champions Cups in 2023, 2024 and 2026, and four Swedish Cups.

The men's team played in the top-tier competition, the Swedish Super League, during the 2016–17, 2017–18, and 2020–21 to 2024–25 seasons, before being dissolved in 2025 due to financial reasons. The team's greatest success was ninth place in three seasons 2021–22 to 2023–24.

Since 2014, the club has also a football team, Team TG FF.

== Women's team ==
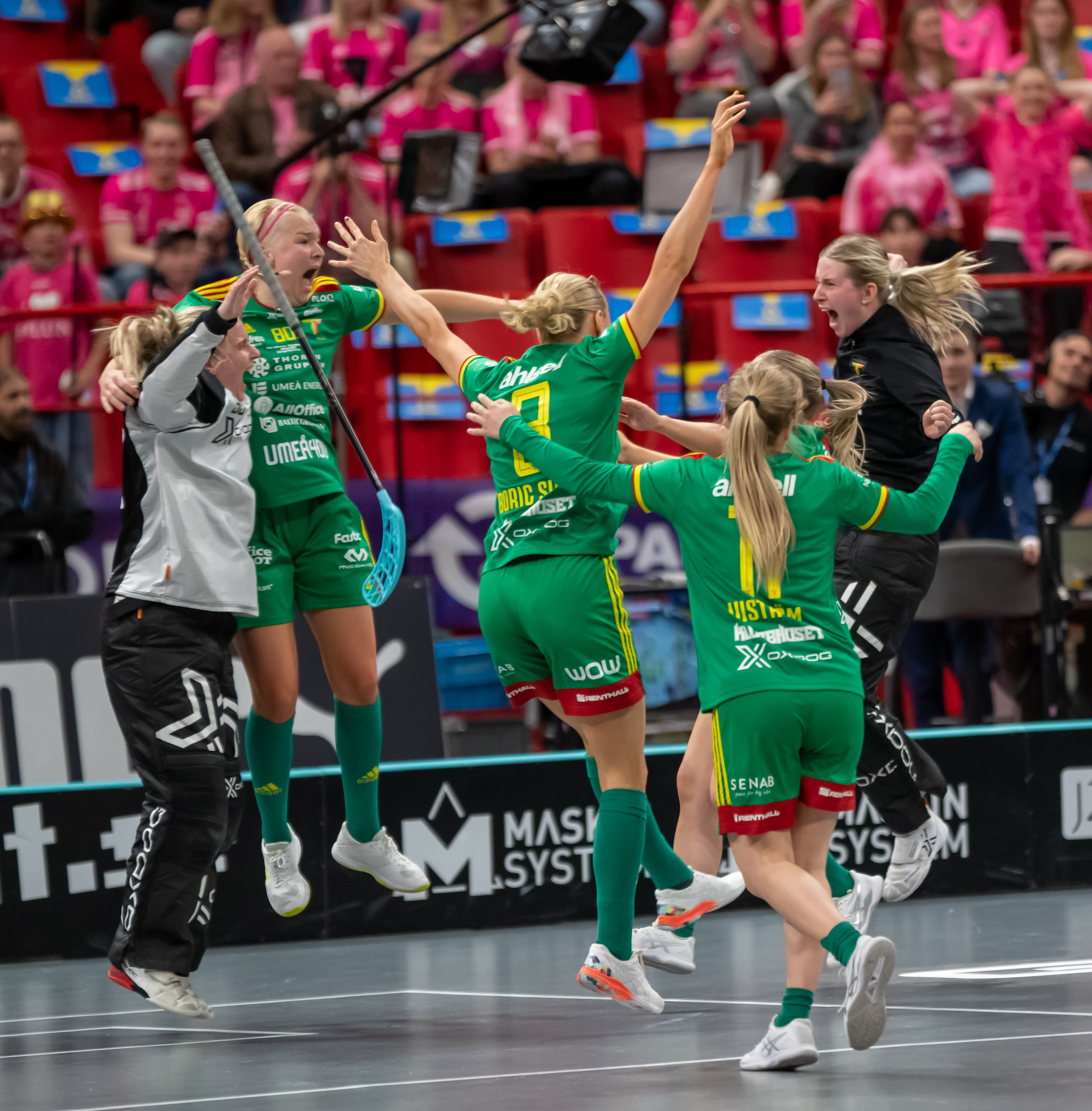
Team Thorengruppen players celebrating a goal in the 2021–22 finals

=== Seasons ===
Season	Rank	Note
The team was promoted in 2019–20 season
2020–21	1st	Champions – defeated Pixbo Wallenstam IBK in final
2021–22	1st	Champions – defeated Pixbo Wallenstam IBK in final
2022–23	1st	Champions – defeated Pixbo Wallenstam IBK in final
2023–24	1st	Champions – defeated Pixbo IBK in final
2024–25	1st	Champions – defeated Pixbo IBK in final
2025–26	1st	Champions – defeated FBC Kalmarsund in final

=== Champions Cup ===
Tournament	Rank	Note
2023 Champions Cup	1st	Champions – defeated (Finland) TPS Salibandy in final
2024 Champions Cup	1st	Champions – defeated (Sweden) Pixbo IBK in final
2025 Champions Cup	2nd	Runner-up – lost to (Sweden) Pixbo IBK in final
2026 Champions Cup	1st	Champions – defeated (Czech Republic) 1. SC Vítkovice in final

=== Known players ===
- Veera Kauppi (2020–)
- Maja Viström (2020–)
- Emelie Wibron (2020–2026)

== Men's team ==
=== Seasons ===
Season	Rank	Note
The team was promoted in 2019–20 season
2020–21	10th	Remained in league
2021–22	9th	Remained in league
2022–23	9th	Remained in league
2023–24	9th	Remained in league
2024–25	10th	Remained in league
The team was dissolved after the 2024–25 season
