= Floorball Chur United =

Swiss floorball club

- The women's team of Piranha Chur in the 2019 Champions Cup semifinals against IKSU
- Founded: 2024
- League: Women: Unihockey Prime League; Men: Unihockey Prime League
- Championships: Women: Piranha: National League A (7 titles: 2010, 2012–2016, 2018); Euro Floorball Cup (2nd 2010); BTV: National League A (1990); Men: Rot-Weiss: National League A (12 titles: 1989–1996, 1998, 2000, 2001, 2003)

Floorball Chur United is a floorball club based in Chur, Switzerland. The club was founded in 2024 through the merger of Piranha Chur and Chur Unihockey.

The women's team competes in the Unihockey Prime League, the top Swiss league. It continues the legacy of Piranha Chur, founded in 1998, which won seven championship titles in 2010, 2012 to 2016, and 2018. In 2010, they also finished as runners-up at the Euro Floorball Cup. An earlier predecessor, BTV Chur, also won the league championship in 1990.

The men's team also plays in the Unihockey Prime League, continuing the legacy of Chur Unihockey, which itself was created in 2004 through the merger of UHC Rot-Weiss Chur and Torpedo Chur. Rot-Weiss won the championship twelve times in 1989 to 1996, 1998, 2000, 2001, and 2003. They were thus the most successful Swiss team until 2023, when they were surpassed by SV Wiler-Ersigen.

== Women's Team ==
=== Seasons ===
Season	Rank	Note
2025–26	5th	Quarterfinal loss to Skorpion Emmental Zollbrück

=== Piranha Chur Seasons ===
Season	Rank	Note
2020–21	5th	Quarterfinal loss to Red Ants Rychenberg Winterthur
2021–22	2nd	Runner-up – lost to Kloten-Dietlikon Jets in final
2022–23	4th	Semifinal loss to Skorpion Emmental Zollbrück
2023–24	4th	Semifinal loss to Zug United
2024–25	6th	Quarterfinal loss to Zug United

=== Champions Cup ===
Tournament	Rank	Note
2026 Champions Cup	–	Quarterfinal loss to (Czech Republic) 1. SC Vítkovice

=== Champions Cup (Piranha Chur) ===
Tournament	Rank	Note
2010 Euro Floorball Cup	2nd	Runner-up – lost to (Sweden) IKSU in final
2012 Champions Cup	3rd	Semifinal loss to (Sweden) IKSU
2013 Champions Cup	3rd	Semifinal loss to (Sweden) Rönnby IBK
2014 Champions Cup	4th	Semifinal loss to (Czech Republic) 1. SC Vítkovice
2015 Champions Cup	3rd	Semifinal loss to (Sweden) KAIS Mora
2016 Champions Cup	5th	Won fifth-place match against (Russia) Nauka MP
2019 Champions Cup	4th	Lost third-place match to (Finland) SB-Pro

== Men's Team ==
=== Seasons ===
Season	Rank	Note
2025–26	11th	Won relegation play-offs against UHC Thun

=== Chur Unihockey Seasons ===
Season	Rank	Note
2020–21	10th	Retained spot
2021–22	9th	Won play-down against UHC Thun
2022–23	12th	Won relegation play-offs against UHC Thun
2023–24	12th	Won relegation play-offs against Floorball Fribourg
2024–25	10th	Won play-down against Unihockey Basel Regio

=== European Cup (UHC Rot-Weiss Chur) ===
Tournament	Rank	Note
1993 European Cup	3rd	Won third-place match against (Norway) Greåker IBK
1994 European Cup	5th	Won fifth-place match against (Norway) Greåker IBK
1995 European Cup	4th	Lost third-place match to (Finland) SSV Helsinki
1996 European Cup	3rd	Won third-place match against (Finland) SSV Helsinki
1998 European Cup	4th	Lost third-place match to (Sweden) Fornudden IB
2000–01 European Cup	4th	Lost third-place match to (Sweden) Warbergs IC-85
2001–02 European Cup	4th	Lost third-place match to (Finland) Helsingfors IFK
2003–04 European Cup	4th	Lost third-place match to (Sweden) Haninge IBK
