= IKSU innebandy =

Sports club in Umeå, Sweden

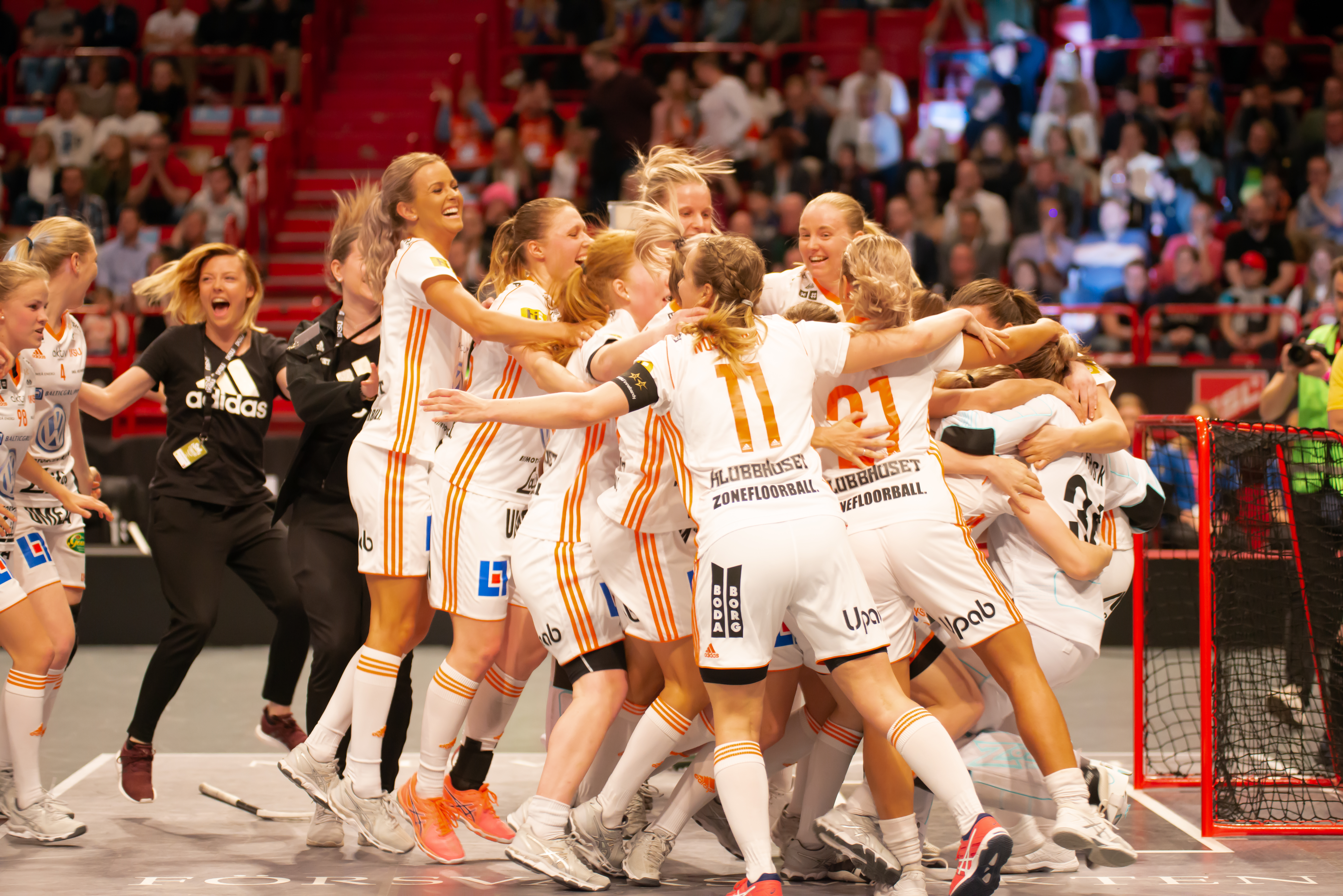
- IKSU players celebrating in the 2017–18 final
- Founded: 1988
- Championships: Women: SSL (2004–05, 2005–06, 2007–08, 2011–12, 2016–17, 2017–18, 2019–20); Champions Cup (2006, 2008, 2009, 2010, 2012, 2017, 2019)

IKSU innebandy is the floorball division of the sports club IKSU from Umeå, Sweden. The floorball division was founded in 1988 and most of its activities were discontinued in 2020.

The now-defunct women's team played in the top-tier Swedish Super League from its inception in 1993. In the 2004–05, 2005–06, 2007–08, 2011–12, 2016–17, 2017–18, and 2019–20 seasons, the team won a record seven championship titles. They also claimed a record seven Champions Cup titles in 2006, 2008, 2009, 2010, 2012, 2017, and 2019. Between December 2017 and April 2019, the team went unbeaten for 49 consecutive games.

After their final league title in 2020, the team was disbanded due to financial difficulties caused by the COVID-19 pandemic. Most players transferred to Team Thorengruppen, also from Umeå, which was promoted to the Super League that same year. Thorengruppen continued IKSU's success, winning all fix league titles as of 2026.

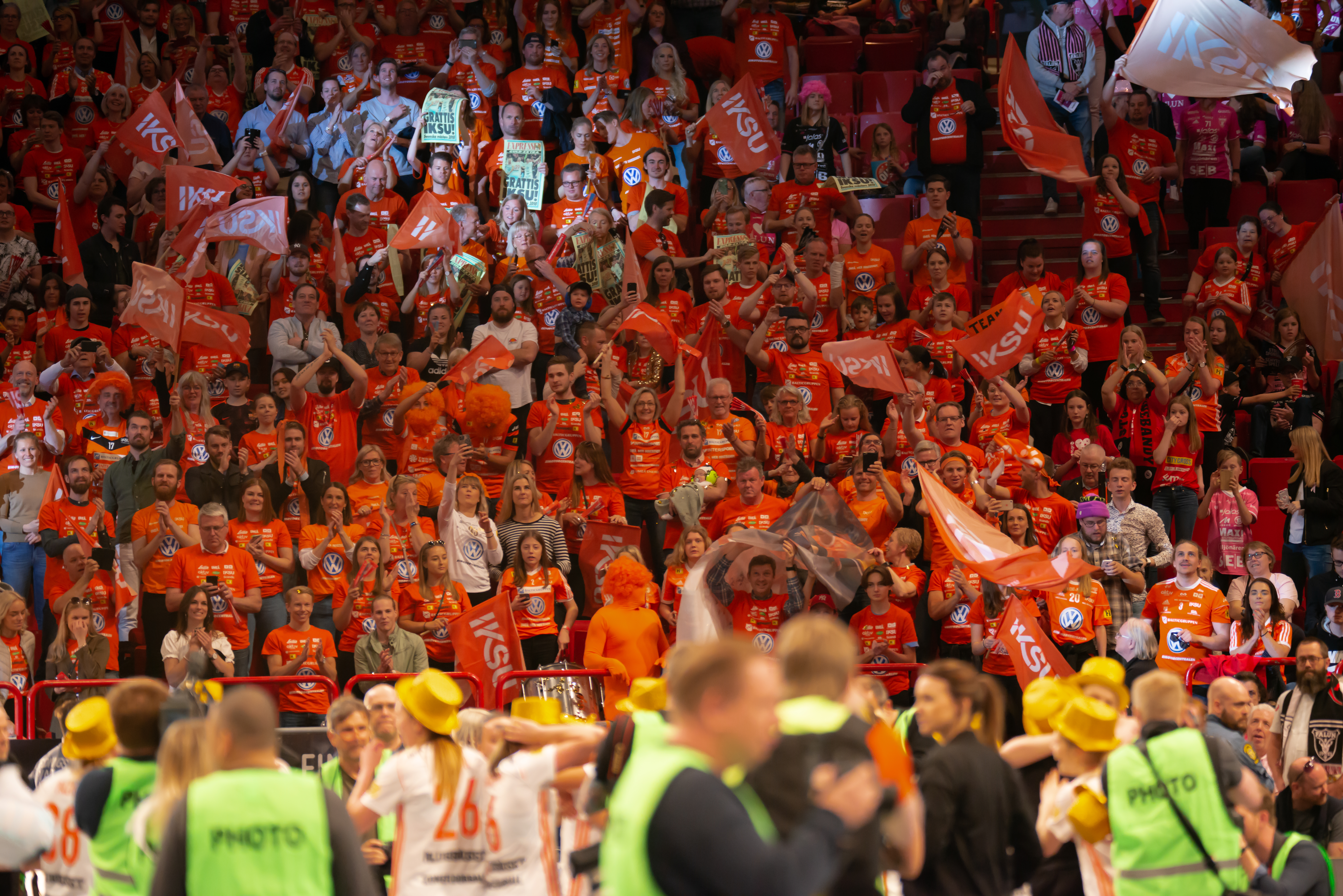
Team supporters in the 2017–18 final

The now-defunct men's team played in the top-tier Swedish Super League in the 1992–93 and 1993–94 seasons. After relegation, it was disbanded.

== Women's Team ==
=== Seasons ===
Season	Rank	Note
2015–16	3rd	Semifinal loss to KAIS Mora IF
2016–17	1st	Champions – defeated KAIS Mora IF in final
2017–18	1st	Champions – defeated KAIS Mora IF in final
2018–19	3rd	Semifinal loss to Täby FC
2019–20	1st	Season ended two rounds before the end of the regular season due to the COVID-19 pandemic
The team was dissolved after the 2019–20 season. Most players transferred to Team Thorengruppen.

=== Champions Cup ===
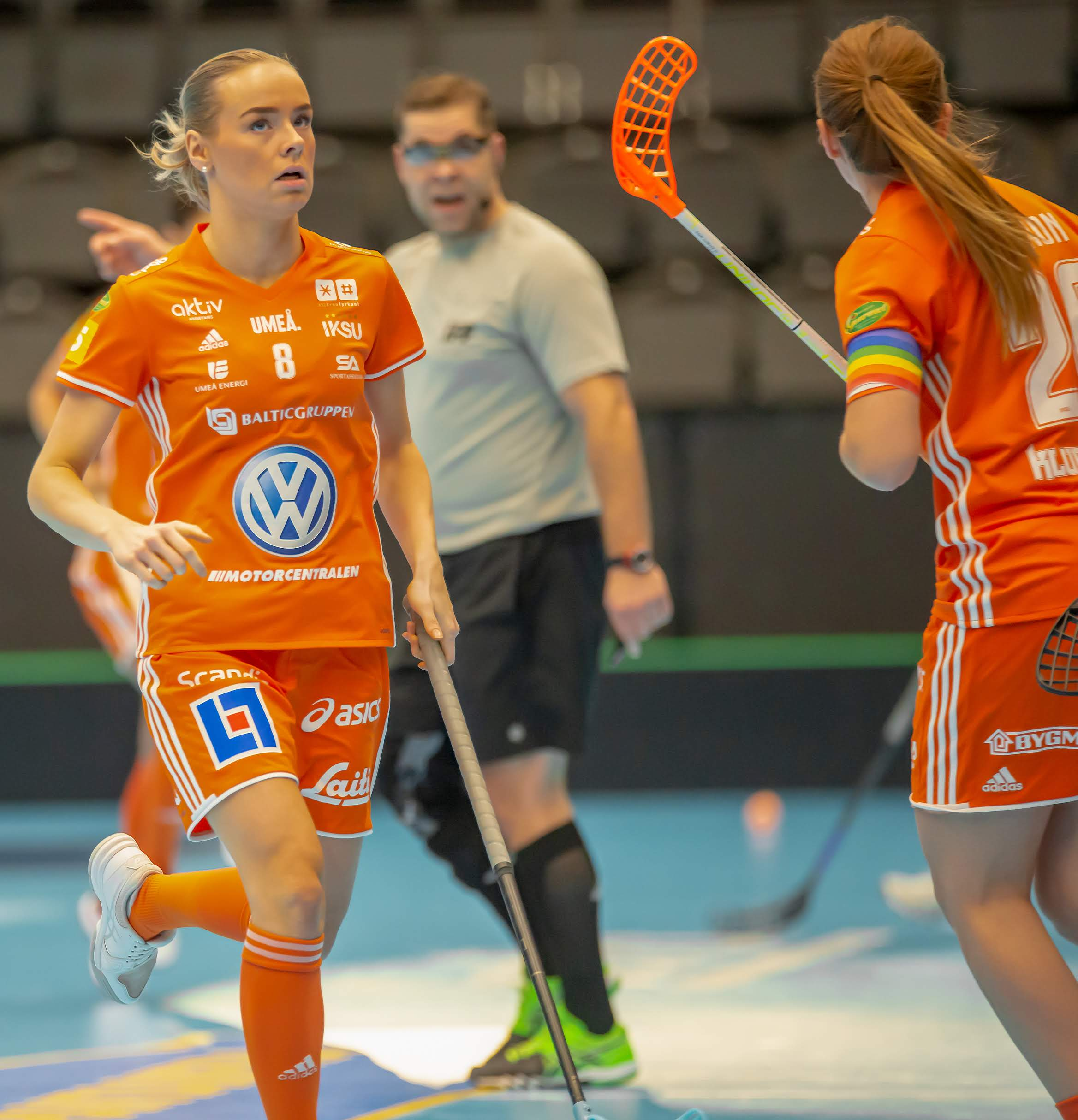
IKSU players at 2019 Champions Cup

Tournament	Rank	Note
2005–06 European Cup	1st	Champions – defeated (Finland) Tikkurilan Tiikerit in final
2006–07 Euro Floorball Cup	2nd	Runner-up – lost to (Switzerland) UHC Dietlikon in final
2007–08 Euro Floorball Cup	2nd	Runner-up – lost to (Switzerland) UHC Dietlikon in final
2008 Euro Floorball Cup	1st	Champions – defeated (Sweden) Balrog IK in final
2009 Euro Floorball Cup	1st	Champions – defeated (Switzerland) UHC Dietlikon in final
2010 Euro Floorball Cup	1st	Champions – defeated (Switzerland) Piranha Chur in final
2012 Champions Cup	1st	Champions – defeated (Finland) Classic in final
2016 Champions Cup	4th	Semifinal loss to (Finland) Classic
2017 Champions Cup	1st	Champions – defeated (Finland) Classic in final
2019 Champions Cup	1st	Champions – defeated (Czech Republic) 1. SC Vítkovice in final

=== Known Players ===
- Veera Kauppi (2018–2020)
- Maja Viström (2017–2020)
- Emelie Wibron (2008–2013, 2014–2020)
- Anna Wijk (2008–2010)
