= National League B (Floorball) =

Swiss floorball league

- No. of teams: Men: 12; Women: 10
- Country: Switzerland
- Confederation: Swiss Unihockey
- Level on pyramid: 2
- Promotion to: Men: Unihockey Prime League; Women: Unihockey Prime League
- Relegation to: First Division

The National League B is the second highest league in Swiss floorball.

The men's NLB is composed of 12 teams and the women's league of 10 teams. The next higher leagues are men's and women's Unihockey Prime League and the next lower is the First Division.

== Teams ==
Teams in season 2026–27:

=== Men ===
- Ad Astra Obwalden (Sarnen)
- Bassersdorf Nürensdorf (Bassersdorf and Nürensdorf)
- Floorball Fribourg (Fribourg)
- Pfannenstiel Egg (Egg)
- Regazzi Verbano UH Gordola (Gordola)
- Ticino Unihockey (Ticino)
- UHC Grünenmatt (Lützelflüh)
- UHC Lok Reinach (Reinach, Aargau)
- UHC Sarganserland (Sargans)
- UHC Thun (Thun)
- Unihockey Basel Regio (Oberwil and Basel)
- Unihockey Langenthal Aarwangen (Langenthal and Aarwangen)

=== Women ===
- Aergera Giffers (Giffers)
- Chilis Rümlang-Regensdorf (Rümlang and Regensdorf)
- Nesslau Sharks (Nesslau)
- Red Lions Frauenfeld (Frauenfeld)
- UH Appenzell (Appenzell)
- UH Lejon Zäziwil (Konolfingen and Zäziwil)
- UHC Bremgarten (Bremgarten, Aargau)
- Unihockey Basel Regio (Oberwil and Basel)
- Visper Lions (Visp)
- WASA St. Gallen
