= 2023–24 Women's Floorball Champions Cup =

European floorball tournament

Women's Floorball Champions Cup
- 2023–24

Tournament information
- Sport: Floorball
- Dates: 19 August 2023–26 January 2024
- Teams: 8
- Website: Floorball Champions Cup

Final positions
- Champions: (Sweden) Thorengruppen IBK (2nd title)
- Runner-up: (Sweden) Pixbo IBK

Tournament statistics
- Matches played: 13
- Goals scored: 154 (11.85 per match)
- Attendance: 5,857 (451 per match)

The 2023–24 Women's Floorball Champions Cup was the 29th edition of the premier competition for floorball clubs and the first in a new format for league and cup winners. The reigning champions were Thorengruppen IBK.

Thorengruppen IBK won their second title to win the cup by beating Pixbo IBK 4–3 in Mölnlycke in an all-Swedish final.

== Format ==
The format had undergone a new format in the season with the inclusion of the cup winners from all four countries. If the same team wins the league and the cup in their country, the second-place team in the league also takes part.

For quarterfinals the eight teams are divided into two conferences based on their geographical location. The Swedish and Finnish teams take part in the Northern conference; the clubs from the Czech Republic and Switzerland play in the Southern conference. The four winners advance to the semifinals. Quarterfinals and semifinals are played in a home and away format. If a round is undecided after the two matches, the second match is followed by an overtime. The two semifinal winners play in a final held at a centralized venue.

== Teams ==
Conference	Country (League)	League Winner	Cup Winner/Runners-up
Northern	Sweden (Swedish Super League)	Thorengruppen IBK (1st)	Pixbo IBK (Cup)
Northern	Finland (F-liiga)	TPS (1st, Cup)	Classic (2nd)
Southern	Czech Republic (Extraliga žen)	1. SC Vítkovice (1st, Cup)	FBC Ostrava (2nd)
Southern	Switzerland (Unihockey Prime League)	Kloten-Dietlikon Jets (1st)	Zug United (Cup)

Location of teams of the 2023–24 Floorball Champions Cup.

== Tournament ==
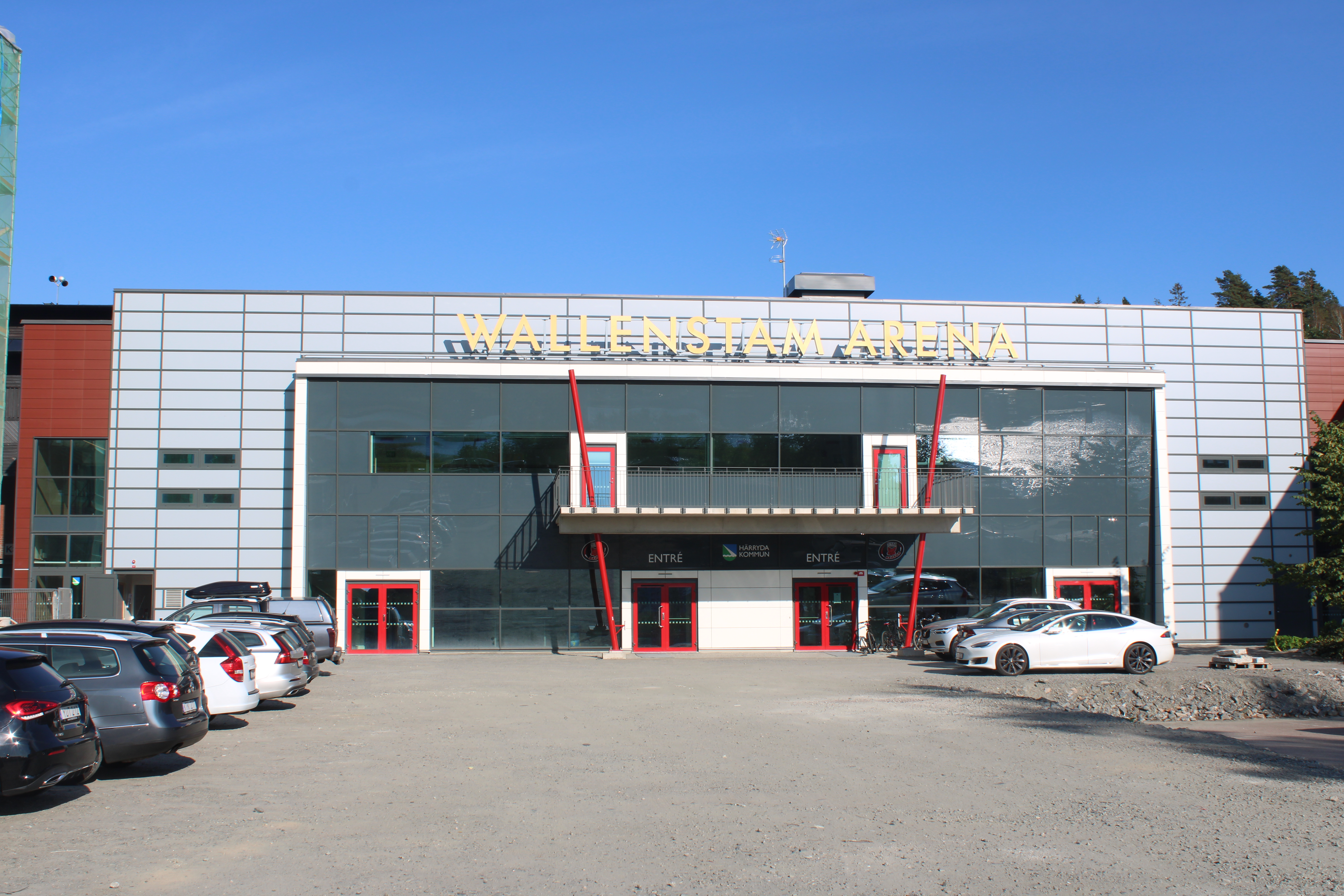
The final was held at the Wallenstam Arena in Mölnlycke.

Quarterfinals pairs were announced on 8 June 2023. The Northern Conference's quarterfinals was played on 26 and 27 August 2023, and the Southern Conference's was played on 16 and 23 September. The draw for the semifinals took place on 25 September. The first leg of the semifinals was played on 22 and 26 November, while the second leg was played on 29 November and 2 December. The finals took place on 26 January 2024 at the Wallenstam Arena in Mölnlycke.

=== Bracket ===
Quarterfinals
(Sweden) Thorengruppen IBK	9	12	2
(Finland) Classic	4	2	0
(Czech Republic) 1. SC Vítkovice	1	5	0
(Switzerland) Zug United	4	7	2
(Switzerland) Kloten-Dietlikon Jets	2	4	1 (2)
(Czech Republic) FBC Ostrava	3	1	1 (1)
(Finland) TPS	6	4	0
(Sweden) Pixbo IBK	13	9	2

Semifinals
(Sweden) Thorengruppen IBK	16	15	2
(Switzerland) Zug United	3	2	0
(Switzerland) Kloten-Dietlikon Jets	3	5	0
(Sweden) Pixbo IBK	6	10	2

Final
26 January – Wallenstam Arena
(Sweden) Thorengruppen IBK	4
(Sweden) Pixbo IBK	3

All times are local – CET/CEST, unless stated otherwise.

=== Quarterfinals ===
20 August 2023; 13:00 EEST	Classic (Finland)	4–9 (0–2, 1–5, 3–2)	(Sweden) Thorengruppen IBK	Bläk Boks, Lempäälä; Attendance: 305

Report

26 August 2023; 15:00	Thorengruppen IBK (Sweden)	12–2 (3–2, 3–0, 6–0)	(Finland) Classic	Thoren Arena, Umeå; Attendance: 418

Report

Thorengruppen IBK won the series 2–0.

16 September 2023; 17:00	Zug United (Switzerland)	4–1 (0–1, 2–0, 2–0)	(Czech Republic) 1. SC Vítkovice	Kantonsschule Zug, Zug; Attendance: 250

Report

23 September 2023; 17:00	1. SC Vítkovice (Czech Republic)	5–7 (3–0, 1–5, 1–2)	(Switzerland) Zug United	SC Dubina, Ostrava; Attendance: 415

Report

Zug United won the series 2–0.

16 September 2023; 18:30	FBC Ostrava (Czech Republic)	3–2 (1–2, 2–0, 0–0)	(Switzerland) Kloten-Dietlikon Jets	ČPP Aréna, Ostrava; Attendance: 428

Report

23 September 2023; 18:30	Kloten-Dietlikon Jets (Switzerland)	4–1 (1–0, 1–1, 2–0, 0–0); SO: 2–1	(Czech Republic) FBC Ostrava	Sporthalle Ruebisbach, Kloten; Attendance: 421

Report

After a win for either side, Kloten-Dietlikon Jets advanced after winning the penalty shootout 2–1.

19 August 2023; 15:00	Pixbo IBK (Sweden)	13–6 (3–2, 7–1, 3–3)	(Finland) TPS	Wallenstam Arena, Mölnlycke; Attendance: 352

Report

26 August 2023; 15:00 EEST	TPS (Finland)	4–9 (1–4, 3–0, 0–5)	(Sweden) Pixbo IBK	Kupittaan Palloiluhalli, Turku; Attendance: 225

Report

Pixbo IBK won the series 2–0.

=== Semifinals ===
4 November 2023; 18:00	Zug United (Switzerland)	3–16 (0–2, 2–4, 1–10)	(Sweden) Thorengruppen IBK	Kantonsschule Zug, Zug; Attendance: 399

Report

10 November 2023; 19:00	Thorengruppen IBK (Sweden)	15–2 (5–1, 4–1, 6–0)	(Switzerland) Zug United	Thoren Arena, Umeå; Attendance: 562

Report

Thorengruppen IBK won the series 2–0.

5 November 2023; 13:00	Pixbo IBK (Sweden)	6–2 (2–0, 3–1, 1–1)	(Switzerland) Kloten-Dietlikon Jets	Wallenstam Arena, Mölnlycke; Attendance: 189

Report

11 November 2023; 18:00	Kloten-Dietlikon Jets (Switzerland)	5–10 (1–5, 1–4, 3–1)	(Sweden) Pixbo IBK	Sporthalle Stighag, Kloten; Attendance: 325

Report

Pixbo IBK won the series 2–0.

=== Final ===
26 January 2024; 19:00	Thorengruppen IBK (Sweden)	4–3 (1–2, 3–0, 0–1)	(Sweden) Pixbo IBK	Wallenstam Arena, Mölnlycke; Attendance: 1,568

Report

2023–24 Women's Floorball Champions Cup Champions

Thorengruppen IBK
Second title

== See also ==
- 2023–24 Men's Floorball Champions Cup
