= Lidl Unihockey Prime League (women's floorball) =

Highest league in Swiss floorball

- Sport: Floorball
- Founded: 1986; 40 years ago
- No. of teams: 10
- Country: Switzerland
- Confederation: Swiss Unihockey
- Most recent champion: Wizards Bern Burgdorf (2026, 1st title)
- Most titles: Red Ants Winterthur (18 titles, last in 2011)
- Level on pyramid: Level 1
- Relegation to: National League B
- Domestic cup: Swiss Cup
- International cup: Champions Cup
- Website: unihockey.swiss

Unihockey Prime League Women (also known as Lidl Unihockey Prime League Women due to sponsorship, abbreviated as L-UPL Women) is the top women's floorball league in Switzerland. The league consists of 10 teams. It was first played in the 1986–87 season.

The champion of the league is eligible to compete at the Champions Cup. The lower league is National League B.

The most successful team in the league is Red Ants Winterthur, with 18 titles, the latest of which came in the 2010–11 season. In the most recent 2025–26 season, Wizards Bern Burgdorf claimed their first title.

== History ==
Since its founding, the league was known as National League A (NLA). Between the 2007–08 and 2012–13 seasons, it was renamed Swiss Mobiliar League (SML) due to sponsorship, before reverting to NLA. The league adopted its current name in the 2022–23 season following a new sponsorship agreement.

Between 2007 and 2017, the league featured only eight teams. The Superfinal, a single match deciding the championship title, was introduced in 2015.

== Competition format ==
In the regular season, which takes place approximately from September to March, all teams play each other twice, resulting in a total of 18 rounds. Teams earn 3 points for a win, 2 points for an overtime win, and 1 point for an overtime loss.

At the end of the regular season, the top eight teams advance to the playoff, which usually begin in March and culminate in April. The top three teams get to choose their opponents from the bottom four for the quarterfinals. Semifinal matchups are determined based on regular season standings. The quarterfinals and semifinals are played in a best-of-seven format. The final consists of a single match, held alongside the men's league final as part of the Superfinal event. The league champion qualifies for the Champions Cup. If the same team wins both the league and the Swiss Cup, the league runner-up also qualifies. The finalists of both competitions face off in the Supercup.

The bottom two teams from the regular season play a best-of-seven relegation series, with the winner remaining in the league. The loser competes in a promotion/relegation playoff against the National League B (NLB) champion, played in a best-of-five format.

== Current teams ==
Location of teams in Unihockey Prime League Women

Teams in 2026–27 season:

- FB Riders DBR (Dürnten, Bubikon and Rüti)
- Floorball Chur United
- Floorball Uri (Altdorf and Seedorf)
- Kloten-Dietlikon Jets
- Red Ants Winterthur (Winterthur)
- Skorpion Emmental Zollbrück (Emmental)
- UHC Laupen ZH (Laupen)
- Unihockey Berner Oberland (Höfen)
- Wizards Bern Burgdorf (Bern, Burgdorf)
- Zug United

== Past Champions ==
Finalists in past seasons:

Season	Champions	Runner-up
1987	HC Rychenberg Winterthur	
1988	HC Rychenberg Winterthur	
1989	HC Rychenberg Winterthur	
1990	BTV Chur	
1991	HC Rychenberg Winterthur	
1992	HC Rychenberg Winterthur	
1993	HC Rychenberg Winterthur	
1994	HC Rychenberg Winterthur	
1995	HC Rychenberg Winterthur	
1996	HC Rychenberg Winterthur	
1997	HC Rychenberg Winterthur	
1998	HC Rychenberg Winterthur	Piranha Chur
1999	HC Rychenberg Winterthur	UHC Giants Kloten
2000	HC Rychenberg Winterthur	Jona-Uznach Flames
2001	Red Ants Rychenberg Winterthur	UHC Dietlikon
2002	Red Ants Rychenberg Winterthur	UHC Dietlikon
2003	UHC Dietlikon	Piranha Chur
2004	Red Ants Rychenberg Winterthur	UHC Dietlikon
2005	Red Ants Rychenberg Winterthur	UHC Dietlikon
2006	UHC Dietlikon	Red Ants Rychenberg Winterthur
2007	UHC Dietlikon	Red Ants Rychenberg Winterthur
2008	UHC Dietlikon	Piranha Chur
2009	UHC Dietlikon	Red Ants Rychenberg Winterthur
2010	Piranha Chur	Red Ants Rychenberg Winterthur
2011	Red Ants Rychenberg Winterthur	Piranha Chur
2012	Piranha Chur	UHC Dietlikon
2013	Piranha Chur	UHC Dietlikon
2014	Piranha Chur	UHC Dietlikon
2015	Piranha Chur	UHC Dietlikon
2016	Piranha Chur	UHC Dietlikon
2017	UHC Dietlikon	Piranha Chur
2018	Piranha Chur	UHC Dietlikon
2019	Kloten-Dietlikon Jets	Piranha Chur
2020	The season was cancelled	
2021	Kloten-Dietlikon Jets	Skorpion Emmental Zollbrück
2022	Kloten-Dietlikon Jets	Piranha Chur
2023	Kloten-Dietlikon Jets	Skorpion Emmental Zollbrück
2024	Kloten-Dietlikon Jets	Zug United
2025	Kloten-Dietlikon Jets	Zug United
2026	Wizards Bern Burgdorf	Kloten-Dietlikon Jets

== List of champions ==
Team	Titles	Last
Red Ants Winterthur	18	2010–11
Kloten-Dietlikon Jets	12	2024–25
Piranha Chur	8	2017–18
Wizards Bern Burgdorf	1	2025–26
