= Rubene (floorball club) =

Latvian Floorball League team

- Founded: 1998
- League: Latvian Floorball League
- Location: Rubene, Latvia
- Home ground: Sports centre (sporta nams) "Kocēni"
- Colors: Black, Yellow
- Head coach: Ivars Jēkabsons
- Parent group: Kocēni

Rubene is a Latvian Floorball League team based in Rubene, Kocēni Parish, Latvia.

== Goaltenders ==
- 1 (Latvia) Roberts Trepšs
- 44 (Latvia) Āris Ulmanis
- 39 (Latvia) Āris Aldiņš

== Defencemen ==
- 4 (Latvia) Oskars Keišs
- 14 (Latvia) Jānis Bagāts(C)
- 17 (Latvia) Ivars Jēkabsons
- 18 (Latvia) Einārs Ločmelis
- 23 (Latvia) Kaspars Grundšteins
- 29 (Latvia) Juris Zilberts
- 88 (Latvia) Kaspars Antons
- 99 (Latvia) Matīss Mālnieks

== Forwards ==
- 5 (Latvia) Ringolds Kalniņš
- 8 (Latvia) Andris Jēkabsons
- 12 (Latvia) Leo Lapiņš
- 13 (Latvia) Ingars Matisons
- 19 (Latvia) Uģis Karasevs
- 21 (Latvia) Mārtiņš Zelčs
- 24 (Latvia) Jānis Grundšteins
- 31 (Latvia) Atis Stepāns
