= 2007–08 Men's EuroFloorball Cup Finals =

2007–08 Men's EuroFloorball Cup
Final Round
- Alternate logo for the 2007–08 EuroFloorball Cup

Tournament details
- Host country: Finland
- Venues: 2 (in 1 host city)
- Dates: 9–12 January 2008
- Teams: 8 (from 6 countries)

Final positions
- Champions: (Sweden) AIK (2nd title)

Tournament statistics
- Matches played: 18 (Note: This does not include qualification matches.)
- Goals scored: 212 (11.78 per match)
- Scoring leader(s): (Sweden) Conny Vesterlund (14 points)
- All statistics correct as of 01:49, 15 June 2008 (UTC).

The 2007–08 Men's EuroFloorball Cup Finals took place in Vantaa, Finland, from 9 to 13 January 2008. Allmänna Idrottsklubben Innebandyförening, better known simply as AIK, won the EuroFloorball Cup for the second year in a row after narrowly defeating Warberg IC 2–1 in sudden victory overtime.

The 2007–08 EuroFloorball Cup marked the first year in which the new name for the tournament was used (previously known as the European Cup). The tournament also marked its 15th year, which was a huge achievement for the International Floorball Federation.

In addition to that, AIK's EuroFloorball Cup victory was the 13th for a Swedish floorball club, and 3rd in a row.

== Qualification format ==
Since the top 4 nations at the 2006–07 EuroFloorball Cup were from Sweden, Finland, Switzerland and the Czech Republic, the top team in each of those countries automatically advances straight into the final round. In addition to that, the reigning champions receive automatic qualification into the final round as well. 5 teams in total receive automatic qualification.

Since 5 of the 8 spots are filled, the other 3 need to be decided using regional qualification. In Group C, the runners-up from Sweden, Finland, Switzerland and the Czech Republic compete for a spot in the finals. In the 2007–08 EuroFloorball Cup, both the Swedish champion and the Swedish runners-up automatically qualified for the tournament, and therefore Group C consisted of 3 teams instead of 4. In Groups A and B, the teams are split into regions: West Europe and East Europe. The winning team in each group advances to the finals, making the total number of teams eight.

=== Qualifying venues ===
Group A qualifications for Western Europe took place in Bærum, Norway, from 29 August to 2 September 2007.
Group B qualifications for Eastern Europe took place in Ciampino, Italy, from 5 to 9 September 2007.
Group C qualifications took place in Liberec, Czech Republic, from 7 to 9 September 2007.

Teams that have qualified to take place in the 2007–08 EuroFloorball Cup Finals
(Sweden) AIK Innebandy	(Norway) Fjerdingby IBK	(Finland) SC Classic	(Finland) SSV Helsinki
	Tatran Střešovice		
(Switzerland) SV Wiler-Ersigen	(Czech Republic) Tatran Střešovice	(Italy) Viking Roma FC	(Sweden) Warberg IC

== Championship results ==
=== Preliminary round ===
==== Conference A ====
Pos	Team	Pld	W	D	L	GF	GA	GD	Pts
1	(Sweden) AIK Innebandy	3	3	0	0	27	15	+12	6
2	(Czech Republic) Tatran Střešovice	3	2	0	1	18	14	+4	4
3	(Switzerland) SV Wiler-Ersigen	3	1	0	2	15	16	−1	2
4	(Italy) Viking Roma FC	3	0	0	3	5	20	−15	0

9 January 2008

(Czech Republic) Tatran Střešovice	8–10	(Sweden) AIK Innebandy
Lukas Brychca 09.23; Tomáš Vávra 20.43; Lukas Brychca 39.15; Milan Fridrich 41.58; Michal Jedlička 43.05; Milan Fridrich 49.54; Milan Fridrich 53.57; Lukas Brychca 56.32		Niklas Jihde 03.16; Christoffer Svanemar 04.40; Niklas Jihde 05.22; Niklas Jihde 15.43; Conny Vesterlund 25.58; Niclas Ånmark 39.39; Niklas Jihde 40.30; Conny Vesterlund 47.23; Conny Vesterlund 50.28; Conny Vesterlund 52.37

Energia Areena, Vantaa

(Italy) Viking Roma FC	2–7	(Switzerland) SV Wiler-Ersigen
Christer Lagerström 34.07; Jim Nilsson 47.07		Tomás Sladký 25.43; Joel Krähenbühl 39.48; Joel Krähenbühl 40.32; Patrick Mendelin 46.48; Reto Balmer 48.30; Olle Thorsell 50.27; Simon Bichsel 51.40

Energia Areena, Vantaa

10 January 2008

(Sweden) AIK Innebandy	10–5	(Switzerland) SV Wiler-Ersigen
Christoffer Svanemar 08.09; Fredrik Djurling 20.58; Mats Engnell 27.59; Mats Carlsson 36.20; Conny Vesterlund 37.57; Ricard Norman 43.13; Niklas Jihde 44.07; Niklas Jihde 46.44; Conny Vesterlund 49.53; Niklas Jihde 53.07		Olle Thorsell 04.39; Manuel Zingg 15.54; Vesa Punkari 30.15; Roger Gerber 34.27; Adrian Zimmerman 59.40

Energia Areena, Vantaa

(Czech Republic) Tatran Střešovice	6–1	(Italy) Viking Roma FC
Martin Richter 04.42; Tomáš Vávra 12.37; Michal Jedlička 19.59; Tomáš Vávra 29.21; Adam Štegl 54.17; Milan Fridrich 59.05		Janne Bjerlestam 43.46

Energia Areena, Vantaa

11 January 2008

(Sweden) AIK Innebandy	7–2	(Italy) Viking Roma FC
Mats Engnell 11.05; Mats Carlsson 17.09; Ron Sjöblom 23.14; Ron Sjöblom 35.56; Simon Mossnelid 47.14; Ron Sjöblom 50.52; Ron Sjöblom 55.48		Michael Östlund 38.25; Janne Bjerlestam 56.01

Energia Areena, Vantaa

(Switzerland) SV Wiler-Ersigen	3–4	(Czech Republic) Tatran Střešovice
Vesa Punkari 16.09; Tomás Sladký 44.51; Vesa Punkari 56.35		Michal Jedlička 01.31; Milan Fridrich 31.12; Tomáš Vávra 53.57; Michal Jedlička 59.59

Energia Areena, Vantaa

==== Conference B ====
Pos	Team	Pld	W	D	L	GF	GA	GD	Pts
1	(Sweden) Warberg IC	3	2	1	0	25	20	+5	5
2	(Finland) SC Classic	3	1	1	1	20	16	+4	3
3	(Finland) SSV Helsinki	3	1	1	1	18	16	+2	3
4	(Norway) Fjerdingby IBK	3	0	1	2	11	22	−11	1

9 January 2008

(Finland) SC Classic	5–5	(Finland) SSV Helsinki
Ville Lahdensuo 26.41; Lasse Salminen 29.05; Sami Nyman 36.59; Henri Johansson 59.29; Juuso Kiviharju 59.43		Santtu Manner 08.58; Timo Toivonen 25.53; Teemu Piispanen 34.18; Lauri Kapanen 39.55; Tero Tiitu 57.11

Energia Areena, Vantaa

(Sweden) Warberg IC	7–7	(Norway) Fjerdingby IBK
Martin Emanuelsson 13.01; Jim Canerstam 17.22; Joakim Friberg 25.00; Mathias Larsson 28.41; Mikael Hage 29.30; Joakim Andersson 35.56; Joakim Friberg 47.30		Fredrik Hoff Eriksen 01.20; Raymond Evensen 33.01; Raymond Evensen 42.18; Jørgen Jonsson 48.47; Jørgen Jonsson 53.55; Jon Ketil Nilsen 58.57; Fredrik Hoff Eriksen 59.38

Energia Areena, Vantaa

10 January 2008

(Norway) Fjerdingby IBK	2–6	(Finland) SSV Helsinki
Kim Andrè Johansen 49.29; Kim Andrè Johansen 53.07		Mikael Järvi 06.39; Jani Kukkola 07.15; Santtu Manner 13.39; Mikael Järvi 18.47; Jani Kukkola 39.16; Markus Huhtimo 58.33

Energia Areena, Vantaa

(Sweden) Warberg IC	9–6	(Finland) SC Classic
Joakim Andersson 18.43; Kimmo Eskelinen 25.59; Martin Emanuelsson 37.08; Magnus Svensson 42.50; Magnus Danielsson 43.45; Martin Emanuelsson 44.28; Magnus Svensson 48.14; Martin Emanuelsson 53.19; Karl-Johan Karlsson 58.58		Henri Johansson 16.46; Lassi Vänttinen 24.05; Petri Widgren 30.57; Tero Karppanen 34.54; Sami Mattila 53.37; Sami Mattila 54.45

Energia Areena, Vantaa

11 January 2008

(Finland) SSV Helsinki	7–9	(Sweden) Warberg IC
Tom Strömsten 24.21; Jani Kukkola 39.30; Tero Tiitu 52.00; Tero Tiitu 53.40; Mikael Järvi 55.08; Jani Kukkola 56.22; Harri Forsten 59.25		Joakim Andersson 01.40; Own goal 04.51; Martin Emanuelsson 11.34; Jim Canerstam 13.47; Martin Emanuelsson 20.16; Kimmo Eskelinen 33.08; Magnus Svensson 44.03; Magnus Danielsson 46.53; Joakim Andersson 58.26

Energia Areena, Vantaa

(Norway) Fjerdingby IBK	2–9	(Finland) SC Classic
Jørgen Jonsson 07.53; Glen Evensen 12.55		Petri Widgren 02.37; Lassi Vänttinen 02.49; Lassi Vänttinen 04.24; Sami Nyman 18.41; Sami Nyman 21.48; Sami Nyman 25.31; Matti Toivio 33.41; Joona Nieminen 44.54; Tero Karppanen 50.35

Energia Areena, Vantaa

=== Playoffs ===
Semifinals
A1	(Sweden) AIK Innebandy	4
B2	(Finland) SC Classic	3
B1	(Sweden) Warberg IC	8
A2	(Czech Republic) Tatran Střešovice	2

Finals
A1	(Sweden) AIK Innebandy	2
B1	(Sweden) Warberg IC	1

==== Semi-finals ====
12 January 2008

(Sweden) AIK Innebandy	4–3	(Finland) SC Classic
Niklas Jihde 30.20; Fredrik Djurling 36.52; Conny Vesterlund 50.28; Fredrik Djurling 52.03		Sami Nyman 52.27; Sami Nyman 56.33; Tero Karppanen 58.47

Energia Areena, Vantaa

(Sweden) Warberg IC	8–2	(Czech Republic) Tatran Střešovice
Martin Emanuelsson 00.26; Magnus Danielsson 03.55; Martin Emanuelsson 26.54; Karl-Johan Karlsson 33.25; Martin Emanuelsson 43.12; Magnus Svensson 45.21; Joakim Friberg 56.03; Joakim Andersson 57.41		Michal Jedlička 37.25; Adam Štegl 59.29

Energia Areena, Vantaa

==== Bronze medal match ====
13 January 2008

(Finland) SC Classic	12–3	(Czech Republic) Tatran Střešovice
Juuso Kiviharju 09.20; Juuso Kiviharju 10.58; Henri Johansson 15.01; Lassi Vänttinen 31.04; Mikko Leikkanen 31.51; Juuso Kiviharju 35.43; Henri Johansson 41.29; Lasse Salminen 42.40; Petri Widgren 47.50; Lasse Salminen 47.59; Matti Toivio 54.27; Lasse Salminen 55.55		Michal Jedlička 28.03; Jan Klimes 50.43; Martin Richter 54.17

Energia Areena, Vantaa

==== Championship match ====
13 January 2008

(Sweden) AIK Innebandy	2–1	(Sweden) Warberg IC
Conny Vesterlund 21.57; Fredrik Djurling 69.02		Karl-Johan Karlsson 31.30

Energia Areena, Vantaa

=== Placement round ===
==== 7th place match ====
12 January 2008

(Norway) Fjerdingby IBK	16–11	(Italy) Viking Roma FC
Jørgen Jonsson 03.27; Jørgen Jonsson 11.55; Jørgen Jonsson 18.18; Glen Evensen 19.11; Eric Roos 21.56; Glen Evensen 22.54; Jon Ketil Nilsen 25.35; Glen Evensen 27.07; Glen Evensen 29.35; Kim Andrè Johansen 30.16; Eric Roos 30.22; Kim Andrè Johansen 32.32; Kim Andrè Johansen 37.20; Eric Roos 48.11; Raymond Evensen 51.06; Jørgen Jonsson 57.03		Raine Laine 01.41; Janne Bjerlestam 02.58; Raine Laine 06.42; Raine Laine 12.01; Patrik Voxberg 31.40; Raine Laine 31.50; Christer Lagerström 42.58; Patrik Voxberg 47.28; Michael Östlund 48.50; Patrik Voxberg 56.13; Raine Laine 57.54

Myyrmäki Sport Hall, Vantaa

==== 5th place match ====
12 January 2008

(Switzerland) SV Wiler-Ersigen	5–6	(Finland) SSV Helsinki
Own goal 12.35; Simon Zurflüh 14.27; Dave Wittwer 43.28; Own goal 47.41; Joel Krähenbühl 53.38		Harri Forsten 31.44; Teemu Piispanen 44.07; Jani Kukkola 45.39; Santtu Manner 50.15; Lauri Kapanen 57.09; Own goal 60.15

Myyrmäki Sport Hall, Vantaa

== Statistics and awards ==
=== Leading scorers ===
Player		GP	G	A	PTS	PIM	Team
(Sweden)	Conny Vesterlund	4	8	6	14	4	AIK Innebandy
(Sweden)	Martin Emanuelsson	5	9	3	12	4	Warberg IC
(Sweden)	Niklas Jihde	4	8	4	12	0	AIK Innebandy
(Czech Republic)	Michal Jedlička	5	6	6	12	2	Tatran Střešovice
(Finland)	Lassi Vänttinen	5	4	6	10	2	SC Classic
(Norway)	Jørgen Jonsson	4	7	2	9	2	Fjerdingby IBK
(Finland)	Sami Nyman	5	6	3	9	4	SC Classic
(Norway)	Raymond Evensen	4	3	6	9	2	Fjerdingby IBK
(Sweden)	Jim Canerstam	5	2	7	9	2	Warberg IC
(Italy)	Raine Laine	4	5	3	8	0	Viking Roma FC

=== Standings ===
Rk.	Team
1st place, gold medalist(s)	(Sweden) AIK Innebandy
2nd place, silver medalist(s)	(Sweden) Warberg IC
3rd place, bronze medalist(s)	(Finland) SC Classic
4.	(Czech Republic) Tatran Střešovice
5.	(Finland) SSV Helsinki
6.	(Switzerland) SV Wiler-Ersigen
7.	(Norway) Fjerdingby IBK
8.	(Italy) Viking Roma FC

=== Awards and All-Star Team ===
- Goalkeeper: (Sweden) Peter Sjögren (Warberg IC)
- Defensemen: (Switzerland) Vesa Punkari (SV Wiler-Ersigen), (Sweden) Kimmo Eskelinen (Warberg IC)
- Forwards: (Sweden) Niklas Jihde (AIK Innebandy), (Sweden) Martin Emanuelsson (Warberg IC), (Sweden) Conny Westerlund (AIK Innebandy)

== Notes ==
Preceded by EuroFloorball Cup; 2006–07	Current: EuroFloorball Cup; 2007–08	Succeeded by EuroFloorball Cup; 2008
