= 2008 Men's EuroFloorball Cup Finals =

2008 Men's EuroFloorball Cup
Final round
- 2008 Men's EuroFloorball Cup Finals

Tournament details
- Host country: Switzerland
- Venue: 1 (in 1 host city)
- Dates: 8–12 October 2008
- Teams: 8 (from 6 countries)

Tournament statistics
- Matches played: 8 (Note: This does not include qualification matches.)
- Goals scored: 84 (10.5 per match)
- Scoring leader(s): Lassi Vänttinen (8 points)
- All statistics correct as of 03:09, 10 October 2008 (UTC).

The 2008 Men's EuroFloorball Cup Finals were held in Winterthur, Switzerland from 8 to 12 October 2008.

It was the 16th running of the tournament known earlier as the European Cup. In 2008 the tournament returned to an annual format rather than every two years.

== Qualification Format ==
The reigning champion and the national champion teams of the top 4 nations at the 2007–08 EuroFloorball Cup automatically qualify. In 2008 the nations were Sweden, Finland, Switzerland, and the Czech Republic.

The remaining three teams are decided in regional neats. In Group C, the runners-up to the top team in Sweden, Finland, Switzerland, and the Czech Republic played for a spot in the finals. In the 2007–08 EuroFloorball Cup, both the top team in Sweden and the runners-up automatically qualified for the tournament, and therefore Group C consisted of 3 teams instead of 4. In Groups A and B, the teams are split into regions: West Europe and East Europe, respectively. The winning team in each group advances to the finals, making the total number of teams eight.

To be eligible to take part in the 2008 Men's EuroFloorball Cup, teams that take place in regional qualification must capture the national title in floorball in their country. If that team does not register, then the 2nd place team can register, and so forth.

== Qualifying Venues ==
Group A qualifications for Western Europe took place in Frederikshavn, Denmark from 13 to 17 August 2008.
Group B qualifications for Eastern Europe took place in Bratislava, Slovakia from 27 to 31 August 2008.
Group C qualifications took place in Helsinki, Finland from 22 to 24 August 2008.

== Championship results ==
=== Preliminary round ===
==== Conference A ====
Pos	Team	Pld	W	D	L	GF	GA	GD	Pts
1	(Sweden) AIK Innebandy	2	2	0	0	10	3	+7	4
2	(Switzerland) SV Wiler-Ersigen	2	1	0	1	16	8	+8	2
3	(Czech Republic) Tatran Střešovice	2	1	0	1	11	4	+7	2
4	(Latvia) SK Latvijas Avīze	2	0	0	2	2	21	−19	0

===== 8 October 2008 =====
8 October 2008
10.30

(Latvia) SK Latvijas Avīze	0:8	(Czech Republic) Tatran Střešovice
		11.05 – Johan Von Pahlen; 13.16 – Martin Richter; 22.39 – Martin Richter; 26.39 – Mila Garcar; 19.05 – Johan Von Pahlen; 41.52 – Jan Klimes; 44.22 – Mila Garcar; 54.46 – Lukás Horák

Winterthur, Switzerland
Eulachhallen

8 October 2008
19.30

(Switzerland) SV Wiler-Ersigen	3:6	(Sweden) AIK Innebandy
Patrick Mendelin – 04.48; Adrian Zimmerman – 06.22; Patrick Mendelin – 11.13		09.29 – Fredrik Djurling; 10.22 – Patrik Edgren; 32.46 – Niklas Jihde; 41.49 – Kim Nilsson; 52.10 – Kristoffer Kranberg; 59.56 – Kristoffer Kranberg

Winterthur, Switzerland
Eulachhallen

===== 9 October 2008 =====
9 October 2008
13.30

(Sweden) AIK Innebandy	4:3	(Czech Republic) Tatran Střešovice
Ricard Norman – 18.49; Niklas Jihde – 25.00; Alexander Egebrant – 26.23; Kim Nilsson – 56.50		21.55 – Own goal 34.04 – Milan Fridrich; 41.39 – Matej Jendrisak

Winterthur, Switzerland
Eulachhallen

9 October 2008
19.30

(Switzerland) SV Wiler-Ersigen	13:2	(Latvia) SK Latvijas Avīze
Roger Gerber – 03.14; Lassi Vänttinen – 03.30; Lassi Vänttinen – 05.17; Simon Bichsel – 06.49; Roger Gerber – 17.46; Tomas Sladky – 18.57; Patrick Mendelin – 22.36; Tobias Zeller – 23.22; Lassi Vänttinen – 31.44; Lassi Vänttinen – 34.13; Roger Gerber – 47.04; Patrick Mendelin – 51.28; Patrick Mendelin – 58.37		25.28 – Janis Anis; 52.19 – Matiss Kligins

Winterthur, Switzerland
Eulachhallen

===== 10 October 2008 =====
10 October 2008
13.30

(Sweden) AIK Innebandy	0:0	(Latvia) SK Latvijas Avīze

Winterthur, Switzerland
Eulachhallen

10 October 2008
19.30

(Czech Republic) Tatran Střešovice	0:0	(Switzerland) SV Wiler-Ersigen

Winterthur, Switzerland
Eulachhallen

==== Conference B ====
Pos	Team	Pld	W	D	L	GF	GA	GD	Pts
1	(Finland) SSV Helsinki	2	2	0	0	15	4	+11	4
2	(Sweden) Warberg IC	2	2	0	0	18	8	+10	4
3	(Finland) Tapanilan Erä	2	0	0	2	5	12	−7	0
4	(Norway) Sarpsborg IBK	2	0	0	2	7	21	−14	0

===== 8 October 2008 =====
8 October 2008
13.30

(Norway) Sarpsborg IBK	5:14	(Sweden) Warberg IC
Jan Karlsson – 04.31; Klas Nordin – 15.22; Johan Larsson – 23.19; Jan Karlsson – 28.13; Benny Vestin – 29.41		11.07 – Anders Östling; 12.02 – Christian Kjellman; 19.43 – Martin Emanuelsson; 25.05 – Jim Canerstam; 26.15 – Martin Emanuelsson; 27.07 – Christian Kjellman; 31.14 – Anders Engberg; 48.03 – Simon Nilsson; 50.19 – Martin Emanuelsson; 51.20 – Simon Nilsson; 54.14 – Simon Nilsson; 56.52 – Mathias Larsson; 57.51 – Joakim Hansson; 58.46 – Mattias Hasselström

Winterthur, Switzerland
Eulachhallen

8 October 2008
16.30

(Finland) SSV Helsinki	8:2	(Finland) Tapanilan Erä
Harri Forsten – 13.21; Tero Tiitu – 17.12; Kari-Matti Ratsula – 24.03; Jukka Kinnunen – 28.18; Juha Kivilehto – 31.56; Mikael Järvi – 36.13; Mikael Järvi – 50.15; Jussi Heikkinen – 57.24		27.02 – Jaakko Rissanen; 29.32 – Jaakko Rissanen

Winterthur, Switzerland
Eulachhallen

===== 9 October 2008 =====
9 October 2008
10.30

(Norway) Sarpsborg IBK	2:7	(Finland) SSV Helsinki
Kristian Antonsen – 13.59; Klas Nordin – 17.04		20.38 – Peik Salminen; 26.53 – Mikael Järvi; 45.33 – Tero Tiitu; 46.52 – Kari-Matti Ratsula; 53.18 – Juho Järvinen; 57.28 – Juho Järvinen; 59.24 – Juho Järvinen

Winterthur, Switzerland
Eulachhallen

9 October 2008
16.30

(Sweden) Warberg IC	4:3	(Finland) Tapanilan Erä
Magnus Svensson – 44.56; Magnus Svensson – 52.30; Magnus Svensson – 52.59; Martin Emanuelsson – 55.02		17.24 – Lauri Kapanen; 17.46 – Rein Kivi; 59.13 – Jani Helenius

Winterthur, Switzerland
Eulachhallen

===== 10 October 2008 =====
10 October 2008
10.30

(Finland) Tapanilan Erä	0:0	(Norway) Sarpsborg IBK

Winterthur, Switzerland
Eulachhallen

10 October 2008
16.30

(Sweden) Warberg IC	0:0	(Finland) SSV Helsinki

Winterthur, Switzerland
Eulachhallen

=== Playoffs ===
Semifinals
A1	(Sweden) AIK Innebandy	0
B2	TBD	0
B1	TBD	0
A2	TBD	0

Finals
TBD	0
TBD	0

==== Semi-finals ====
11 October 2008
13.30

(Sweden) AIK Innebandy	0:0	TBD

Winterthur, Switzerland
Eulachhallen

11 October 2008
19.30

TBD	0:0	TBD

Winterthur, Switzerland
Eulachhallen

==== Bronze-medal match ====
12 October 2008
09.00

TBD	0:0	TBD

Winterthur, Switzerland
Eulachhallen

==== Championship Match ====
12 October 2008
15.00

TBD	0:0	TBD

Winterthur, Switzerland
Eulachhallen

=== Placement round ===
==== 7th-place match ====
11 October 2008
10.30

(Latvia) SK Latvijas Avīze	0:0	TBD

Winterthur, Switzerland
Eulachhallen

==== 5th-place match ====
11 October 2008
16.00

TBD	0:0	TBD

Winterthur, Switzerland
Eulachhallen

== Notes ==
Preceded by EuroFloorball Cup; 2007–08	Current: EuroFloorball Cup; 2008	Succeeded by EuroFloorball Cup; 2009
