= 2006–07 Men's EuroFloorball Cup Finals =

2006–07 Men's European Cup
Finals

Tournament details
- Host country: Sweden
- Venues: 2 (in 1 host city)
- Dates: January 3–7, 2007
- Teams: 8 (from 7 countries)

Final positions
- Champions: (Sweden) AIK (1st title)
- Runners-up: (Sweden) Warberg IC
- Third place: (Finland) Espoon Oilers
- Fourth place: (Switzerland) UHC Alligator Malans

Tournament statistics
- Matches played: 18
- Goals scored: 241 (13.39 per match)
- All statistics correct as of 02:51, 22 August 2008 (UTC).

The 2006–07 Men's EuroFloorball Cup Finals was the 14th edition of the premier competition for floorball clubs. It took place in Varberg, Sweden from 3 to 7 January 2007. Allmänna Idrottsklubben Innebandyförening, better known simply as AIK, won the Cup after narrowly defeating Warberg IC 6–5.

The tournament was known as the 2006–07 Men's European Cup, but due to name implications, is now known as the 2006–07 Men's EuroFloorball Cup.

== Championship results ==
=== Preliminary round ===
==== Conference A ====
Pos	Team	Pld	W	D	L	GF	GA	GD	Pts
1	(Sweden) Warberg IC	3	3	0	0	28	6	+22	6
2	(Switzerland) UHC Alligator Malans	3	1	1	1	21	15	+6	3
3	(Czech Republic) Tatran Střešovice	3	1	1	1	16	10	+6	3
4	(Russia) Nizhegorodets	3	0	0	3	10	36	−26	0

3 January 2007

UHC Alligator Malans (Switzerland)	4–4	(Czech Republic) Tatran Střešovice

Sparbankshallen, Varberg

Warberg IC (Sweden)	11–2	(Russia) Nizhegorodets

Sparbankshallen, Varberg

4 January 2007

Nizhegorodets (Russia)	4–9	(Czech Republic) Tatran Střešovice

Sparbankshallen, Varberg

Warberg IC (Sweden)	7–1	(Switzerland) UHC Alligator Malans

Sparbankshallen, Varberg

5 January 2007

Nizhegorodets (Russia)	4–16	(Switzerland) UHC Alligator Malans

Sparbankshallen, Varberg

Tatran Střešovice (Czech Republic)	3–10	(Sweden) Warberg IC

Sparbankshallen, Varberg

==== Conference B ====
Pos	Team	Pld	W	D	L	GF	GA	GD	Pts
1	(Sweden) AIK Innebandy	3	3	0	0	32	9	+23	6
2	(Finland) Espoon Oilers	3	2	0	1	33	16	+17	4
3	(Norway) Greåker IBK	3	1	0	2	18	29	−11	2
4	(Latvia) SK Latvijas Avīze	3	0	0	3	10	39	−29	0

3 January 2007

Espoon Oilers (Finland)	16–4	(Norway) Greåker IBK

Sparbankshallen, Varberg

SK Latvijas Avīze (Latvia)	1–16	(Sweden) AIK Innebandy

Sparbankshallen, Varberg

4 January 2007

SK Latvijas Avīze (Latvia)	5–11	(Finland) Espoon Oilers

Sparbankshallen, Varberg

AIK Innebandy (Sweden)	9–2	(Norway) Greåker IBK

Sparbankshallen, Varberg

5 January 2007

Greåker IBK (Norway)	12–4	(Latvia) SK Latvijas Avīze

Sparbankshallen, Varberg

AIK Innebandy (Sweden)	7–6	(Finland) Espoon Oilers

Sparbankshallen, Varberg

=== Playoffs ===
Semifinals
A1 (Sweden) Warberg IC	5
B2 (Finland) Espoon Oilers	4
B1 (Sweden) AIK Innebandy	8
A2 (Switzerland) UHC Alligator Malans	5

Final
(Sweden) Warberg IC	5
(Sweden) AIK Innebandy	6
Bronze-medal match
(Switzerland) UHC Alligator Malans	4
(Finland) Espoon Oilers	9

==== Semi-finals ====
6 January 2007

Warberg IC (Sweden)	5–4	(Finland) Espoon Oilers

Sparbankshallen, Varberg

AIK Innebandy (Sweden)	8–5	(Switzerland) UHC Alligator Malans

Sparbankshallen, Varberg

==== Bronze-medal match ====
7 January 2007

UHC Alligator Malans (Switzerland)	4–9	(Finland) Espoon Oilers

Sparbankshallen, Varberg

==== Championship Match ====
7 January 2007

Warberg IC (Sweden)	5–6	(Sweden) AIK Innebandy

Sparbankshallen, Varberg

=== Placement round ===
==== 7th-place match ====
6 January 2007

SK Latvijas Avīze (Latvia)	11–5	(Russia) Nizhegorodets

Idrottshallen, Varberg

==== 5th-place match ====
6 January 2007

Tatran Střešovice (Czech Republic)	7–4	(Norway) Greåker IBK

Idrottshallen, Varberg

=== Standings ===
Rk.	Team
1st place, gold medalist(s)	(Sweden) AIK Innebandy
2nd place, silver medalist(s)	(Sweden) Warberg IC
3rd place, bronze medalist(s)	(Finland) Espoon Oilers
4.	(Switzerland) UHC Alligator Malans
5.	(Czech Republic) Tatran Střešovice
6.	(Norway) Greåker IBK
7.	(Latvia) SK Latvijas Avīze
8.	(Russia) Nizhegorodets

Preceded by EuroFloorball Cup; 2005–06	Current: EuroFloorball Cup; 2006–07	Succeeded by EuroFloorball Cup; 2007–08
