= 2005–06 Men's EuroFloorball Cup Finals =

2005–06 Men's European Cup
Finals

Tournament details
- Host country: Czech Republic
- Venue: 1 (in 1 host city)
- Dates: 4–8 January 2006
- Teams: 8 (from 8 countries)

Final positions
- Champions: (Sweden) Warberg IC (3rd title)
- Runners-up: (Finland) SSV Helsinki
- Third place: (Switzerland) SV Wiler-Ersigen
- Fourth place: (Czech Republic) Tatran Střešovice

Tournament statistics
- Matches played: 18
- Goals scored: 212 (11.78 per match)
- All statistics correct as of 23:10, 23 August 2008 (UTC).

The 2005–06 Men's EuroFloorball Cup Finals took place in Ostrava, Czech Republic from 4 to 8 January 2006. Warberg IC won the EuroFloorball Cup after defeating SSV Helsinki 7–6 after penalty shots.

The tournament was known as the 2005–06 Men's European Cup, but due to name implications, is now known as the 2005–06 Men's EuroFloorball Cup.

== Championship results ==
=== Preliminary round ===
==== Conference A ====
Pos	Team	Pld	W	D	L	GF	GA	GD	Pts
1	(Switzerland) SV Wiler-Ersigen	3	3	0	0	30	4	+26	6
2	(Czech Republic) Tatran Střešovice	3	2	0	1	18	21	−3	4
3	(Norway) Sarpsborg IBK	3	1	0	2	13	27	−14	2
4	(Russia) Nizhegorodets	3	0	0	3	17	26	−9	0

4 January 2006

SV Wiler-Ersigen (Switzerland)	12–1	(Norway) Sarpsborg IBK

Ostrava, Czech Republic

Tatran Střešovice (Czech Republic)	9–8	(Russia) Nizhegorodets

Ostrava, Czech Republic

5 January 2006

Sarpsborg IBK (Norway)	8–6	(Russia) Nizhegorodets

Ostrava, Czech Republic

SV Wiler-Ersigen (Switzerland)	9–0	(Czech Republic) Tatran Střešovice

Ostrava, Czech Republic

6 January 2006

Sarpsborg IBK (Norway)	4–9	(Czech Republic) Tatran Střešovice

Ostrava, Czech Republic

Nizhegorodets (Russia)	3–9	(Switzerland) SV Wiler-Ersigen

Ostrava, Czech Republic

==== Conference B ====
Pos	Team	Pld	W	D	L	GF	GA	GD	Pts
1	(Finland) SSV Helsinki	3	3	0	0	20	5	+15	6
2	(Sweden) Warberg IC	3	2	0	1	27	9	+18	4
3	(Latvia) Rubene	3	1	0	2	14	23	−9	2
4	(Denmark) FC Outlaws	3	0	0	3	4	28	−24	0

4 January 2006

FC Outlaws (Denmark)	4–10	(Latvia) Rubene

Ostrava, Czech Republic

Warberg IC (Sweden)	3–7	(Finland) SSV Helsinki

Ostrava, Czech Republic

5 January 2006

SSV Helsinki (Finland)	8–2	(Latvia) Rubene

Ostrava, Czech Republic

Warberg IC (Sweden)	13–0	(Denmark) FC Outlaws

Ostrava, Czech Republic

6 January 2006

Rubene (Latvia)	2–11	(Sweden) Warberg IC

Ostrava, Czech Republic

SSV Helsinki (Finland)	5–0	(Denmark) FC Outlaws

Ostrava, Czech Republic

=== Playoffs ===
Semifinals
A1	(Switzerland) SV Wiler-Ersigen	6
B2	(Sweden) Warberg IC	7
B1	(Finland) SSV Helsinki	4
A2	(Czech Republic) Tatran Střešovice	1

Finals
A1	(Sweden) Warberg IC	7
B1	(Finland) SSV Helsinki	6

==== Semi-finals ====
7 January 2006

SV Wiler-Ersigen (Switzerland)	6–7	(Sweden) Warberg IC

Ostrava, Czech Republic

SSV Helsinki (Finland)	4–1	(Czech Republic) Tatran Střešovice

Ostrava, Czech Republic

==== Bronze-medal match ====
8 January 2006

SV Wiler-Ersigen (Switzerland)	8–1	(Czech Republic) Tatran Střešovice

Ostrava, Czech Republic

==== Championship Match ====
8 January 2006

Warberg IC (Sweden)	7–6	(Finland) SSV Helsinki

Ostrava, Czech Republic

=== Placement round ===
==== 7th-place match ====
7 January 2006

FC Outlaws (Denmark)	2–4	(Russia) Nizhegorodets

Ostrava, Czech Republic

==== 5th-place match ====
7 January 2006

Sarpsborg IBK (Norway)	7–6	(Latvia) Rubene

Ostrava, Czech Republic

=== Standings ===
Rk.	Team
1st place, gold medalist(s)	(Sweden) Warberg IC
2nd place, silver medalist(s)	(Finland) SSV Helsinki
3rd place, bronze medalist(s)	(Switzerland) SV Wiler-Ersigen
4.	(Czech Republic) Tatran Střešovice
5.	(Norway) Sarpsborg IBK
6.	(Latvia) Rubene
7.	(Russia) Nizhegorodets
8.	(Denmark) FC Outlaws

== See also ==
- 2005–06 Men's EuroFloorball Cup qualifying

Preceded by EuroFloorball Cup; 2004–05	Current: EuroFloorball Cup; 2005–06	Succeeded by EuroFloorball Cup; 2006–07
