= Eskelinen =

Eskelinen is a Finnish surname. Notable people with the surname include:

- August Eskelinen (1898–1987), Finnish biathlete
- Kaj Eskelinen (born 1969), Swedish footballer of Finnish descent
- Kalevi Eskelinen (born 1945), Finnish racing cyclist
- Katri-Helena Eskelinen (1925–2014), Finnish politician
- Kimmo Eskelinen (born 1983), Swedish floorball player
- Rami Eskelinen (born 1967), Finnish jazz drummer
- Seppo Eskelinen (born 1960), Finnish politician
- Toni Eskelinen (born 1995), Finnish ice hockey goaltender
