= 2008 Men's EuroFloorball Cup qualifying =

2008 Men's EuroFloorball Cup
Qualifying Tournaments

Tournament details
- Host countries: Denmark; Slovakia; Finland
- Venues: 3 (in 3 host cities)
- Dates: 13–31 August 2008
- Teams: 18 (from 18 countries)

Final positions
- Champions: (Norway) Sarpsborg IBK (Finland) Tapanilan Erä (Latvia) SK Latvijas Avīze

Tournament statistics
- Matches played: 34
- Goals scored: 446 (13.12 per match)
- All statistics correct as of 16:53, 31 August 2008 (UTC).

The 2008 Men's EuroFloorball Cup Qualifying rounds took place over 13 to 31 August 2008 in three different host nations. The winner of each group advanced to the 2008 Men's EuroFloorball Cup Finals, where they had a chance to win the EuroFloorball Cup for 2008. A total of 18 teams played in the qualifying round, all from different countries.

The 2008 EuroFloorball Cup marks the second year in which the new name for the tournament was used (previously known as the European Cup). The tournament also marks its 16th year.

The IFF decided that the tournament will revert to its original format, and will take place during one calendar year, instead of two.

== Qualification Format ==
Since the top 4 nations at the 2007–08 Men's EuroFloorball Cup were from Sweden, Finland, Switzerland, and the Czech Republic, the top team in that country automatically qualify, as well as the reigning champion. 5 teams in total receive automatic qualification.

Since 5 of the 8 spots are filled, the other 3 need to be decided using regional qualification. In Group C, the runners-up to the top team in Sweden, Finland, Switzerland, and the Czech Republic play for a spot in the finals. In the 2007–08 EuroFloorball Cup, both the top team in Sweden and the runners-up automatically qualified for the tournament, and therefore Group C consisted of 3 teams instead of 4. In Groups A and B, the teams are split into regions: West Europe and East Europe, respectively. The winning team in each group advances to the finals, making the total number of teams eight.

To be eligible to take part in the 2008 Men's EuroFloorball Cup, teams that take place in regional qualification must capture the national title in floorball in their country. If that team does not register, then the 2nd place team can register, and so forth.

== Qualifying Venues ==
Group A qualifications for Western Europe will take place in Frederikshavn, Denmark from 13 to 17 August 2008.
Group B qualifications for Eastern Europe will take place in Bratislava, Slovakia from 27 to 31 August 2008.
Group C qualifications will take place in Helsinki, Finland from 22 to 24 August 2008.

== Frederikshavn, Denmark ==
=== Group A ===
==== Conference A ====
Pos	Team	Pld	W	D	L	GF	GA	GD	Pts
1	(Norway) Sarpsborg IBK	2	2	0	0	17	8	+9	4
2	(Spain) CUF Leganes	2	0	1	1	7	10	−3	1
3	(Germany) Sparkasse Weissenfels	2	0	1	1	11	17	−6	1

13 August 2008
15:00

(Germany) Sparkasse Weissenfels	6:12	(Norway) Sarpsborg IBK
Lasse Heiskanen – 14.00; Sebastian Bernieck – 24.17; Sebastian Bernieck – 33.32; Lasse Heiskanen – 35.43; Tim Böttcher – 53.49; Paavo Haimila – 59.19		06.23 – Daniel Holmberg; 08.17 – Klas Nordin; 26.55 – Kristian Antonsen; 29.08 – Benny Vestin; 29.30 – Jon Skaug; 36.24 – Jon Skaug; 40.07 – Ketil Kristiansen; 40.20 – Klas Nordin; 40.40 – Ketil Kristiansen; 42.55 – Jon Skaug; 50.15 – Jan Karlsson; 52.12 – Johan Larsson

Arena Nord

14 August 2008
12:30

(Spain) CUF Leganes	5:5	(Germany) Sparkasse Weissenfels
Magnus Olson – 19.13; Ville Litmanen – 35.29; Magnus Olson – 38.56; Teppo Haakana – 40.13; Peter Skiden – 59.33		13.56 – Thomas Händler; 22.30 – Robert Brückner; 31.45 – Sebastian Bernieck; 40.37 – Aki Koskinen; 41.16 – Thomas Händler

Arena Nord

15 August 2008
15:00

(Norway) Sarpsborg IBK	5:2	(Spain) CUF Leganes
Ketil Kristiansen – 09.48; Klas Nordin – 12.24; Benny Vestin – 14.10; Benny Vestin – 17.21; Ketil Kristiansen – 26.29		04.45 – Miguel Prieto Gomez; 18.39 – Teppo Haakana

Arena Nord

==== Conference B ====
Pos	Team	Pld	W	D	L	GF	GA	GD	Pts
1	(Denmark) Hafnia FC	3	3	0	0	54	5	+49	6
2	(Netherlands) HDM	3	2	0	1	22	15	+7	4
3	(France) Paris UC	3	1	0	2	22	21	+1	2
4	(Iceland) Bandýfélag Kópavogs	3	0	0	3	4	61	−57	0

13 August 2008
17:30

(Iceland) Bandýfélag Kópavogs	1:11	(Netherlands) HDM
Pavol Cekan – 26.23		08.22 – Johan Lim; 19.42 – Tomas Wahlgren; 23.28 – Yannick Gouby; 27.41 – Johan Lim; 30.10 – Johan Lim; 31.04 – Ossi Karjalainen; 34.02 – Ossi Karjalainen; 47.25 – Ossi Karjalainen; 48.28 – Ossi Karjalainen; 53.18 – Gustav Le Juge; 55.47 – Ossi Karjalainen

Arena Nord

13 August 2008
20:00

(France) Paris UC	1:11	(Denmark) Hafnia FC
Henri Kähönen – 27.09		06.16 – Tomi Tarpio; 19.44 – Tore Kvaslerud; 42.00 – Tore Kvaslerud; 45.39 – Ilias Mahamadou Nielsen; 47.06 – Tore Kvaslerud; 48.21 – Kasper Kennedy; 49.41 – Bo Kanstrup Jensen; 53.47 – Ilias Mahamadou Nielsen; 55.15 – Tore Kvaslerud; 56.42 – Tore Kvaslerud; 58.20 – Tomi Tarpio

Arena Nord

14 August 2008
15:00

(Iceland) Bandýfélag Kópavogs	1:17	(France) Paris UC
Pavol Cekan – 10.36		01.18 – Own goal 03.57 – Henrik Ewetz; 04.50 – Stian Langsholt; 10.49 – Jean-Thomas Briere; 10.59 – Henrik Ewetz; 11.50 – Gabriel Forss; 12.34 – Mathieu Plamondon; 13.09 – Jean-Thomas Briere; 19.47 – Sandro Rinaldi; 23.04 – Jean-Thomas Briere; 27.12 – Michel Ferrero; 29.42 – Henrik Ewetz; 38.57 – André Nadeau; 39.03 – Stian Langsholt; 41.10 – Simen Langsholt; 55.33 – Nick Kanievsky; 57.19 – Simen Langsholt

Arena Nord

14 August 2008
17:30

(Netherlands) HDM	2:10	(Denmark) Hafnia FC
Johan Lim – 19.49; Jacques Fournier – 53.52		00.32 – Tore Kvaslerud; 03.17 – Tore Kvaslerud; 13.15 – Own goal 15.01 – Kasper Kennedy; 18.14 – Kasper Kennedy; 37.25 – Tomi Tarpio; 39.02 – Tore Kvaslerud; 43.08 – Rasmus Irming Jolck; 50.31 – Tomi Tarpio; 59.46 – Tore Kvaslerud

Arena Nord

15 August 2008
12:30

(Netherlands) HDM	9:4	(France) Paris UC
Roland Velu – 02.08; Benjamin Frey – 12.28; Johan Lim – 18.50; Tomas Wahlgren – 34.49; Benjamin Frey – 36.01; Ossi Karjalainen – 49.16; Björn van Wieringen – 50.25; Francois Boudreault – 51.02; Johan Lim- 57.09		02.39 – Stian Langsholt; 13.33 – Henri Kähönen; 21.53 – Mathieu Plamondon; 54.05 – Henri Kähönen

Arena Nord

15 August 2008
17:30

(Denmark) Hafnia FC	33:2	(Iceland) Bandýfélag Kópavogs
Kasper Kennedy – 01.31; Tore Kvaslerud – 04.20; Rasmus Irming Jolck – 05.02; Sebastian Knudsen – 08.56; Kasper Kennedy – 09.48; Jesper Christensen – 11.41; Bo Kanstrup Jensen – 13.30; Sebastian Knudsen – 13.47; Jesper Christensen – 16.44; Jesper Schow Petersen – 18.11; Tore Kvaslerud – 22.26; Tore Kvaslerud – 25.46; Tore Kvaslerud – 27.19; Kasper Kennedy – 28.26; Ilias Mahamadou Nielsen – 34.55; Jesper Schow Petersen 35.41; Sebastian Knudsen – 37.43; Bo Kanstrup Jensen – 38.56; Stig Thorsteinsson – 39.39; Bo Kanstrup Jensen – 42.13; Stig Thorsteinsson – 45.05; Tore Kvaslerud – 47.57; Stig Thorsteinsson – 48.39; Ilias Mahamadou Nielsen – 49.37; Jesper Schow Petersen – 50.34; Bo Kanstrup Jensen – 50.45; Ilias Mahamadou Nielsen – 53.43; Jakob Rune Westh Andersen – 55.30; Jesper Schow Petersen – 56.03; Tore Kvaslerud – 56.17; Stig Thorsteinsson – 56.33; Bo Kanstrup Jensen – 56.46; Stig Thorsteinsson – 59.21		38.01 – Gunnar Gils Kristinsson; 48.57 – Bryngeir Arnar Bryngeirsson

Arena Nord

==== Playoffs ====
Semifinals
A1	(Norway) Sarpsborg IBK	20
B2	(Netherlands) HDM	2
B1	(Denmark) Hafnia FC	5
A2	(Spain) CUF Leganes	3

Finals
A1	(Norway) Sarpsborg IBK	8
B1	(Denmark) Hafnia FC	5

===== Semi-finals =====
16 August 2008
15:15

(Norway) Sarpsborg IBK	20:2	(Netherlands) HDM
Ketil Kristiansen – 01.01; Benny Vestin – 04.23; Johan Larsson – 05.44; Tormod Hoydal – 07.07; Jon Skaug – 08.02; Daniel Holmberg – 15.01; Morten Olsen – 18.29; Ketil Kristiansen – 19.03; Klas Nordin – 19.13; Ketil Kristiansen – 28.47; Klas Nordin – 31.51; Ketil Kristiansen – 37.53; Klas Nordin – 38.04; Klas Nordin – 40.17; Johan Larsson – 45.20; Klas Nordin – 45.54; Ketil Kristiansen – 50.28; Klas Nordin – 50.33; Christer Sotorp – 57.03; Jon Skaug – 58.28		31.15 – Ossi Karjalainen; 33.00 – Jacques Fournier

Arena Nord

16 August 2008
18:00

(Denmark) Hafnia FC	5:3	(Spain) CUF Leganes
Bo Kanstrup Jensen – 12.21; Jesper Schow Petersen – 21.15; Tore Kvaslerud – 48.49; Tore Kvaslerud – 57.24; Jesper Schow Petersen – 59.37		11.53 – Peter Skiden; 16.30 – Peter Skiden; 44.01 – Ricardo Sanchez Murillo

Arena Nord

===== Bronze-medal match =====
17 August 2008
10:00

(Netherlands) HDM	2:7	(Spain) CUF Leganes
Johan Lim – 42.48; Benjamin Frey – 52.05		19.06 – Teppo Haakana; 22.22 – Peter Skiden; 43.10 – Javier Robledo Zarco; 48.29 – Javier Robledo Zarco; 52.45 – Teppo Haakana; 59.32 – Teppo Haakana; 59.55 – Ricardo Sanchez Murillo

Arena Nord

===== Championship Match =====
17 August 2008
13:00

(Norway) Sarpsborg IBK	8:5	(Denmark) Hafnia FC
Daniel Holmberg – 26.11; Benny Vestin – 27.12; Ketil Kristiansen – 27.52; Benny Vestin – 32.00; Jon Skaug – 33.42; Benny Vestin – 42.59; Johan Larsson – 46.49; Jon Skaug – 57.17		10.24 – Kasper Kennedy; 26.41 – Kasper Kennedy; 51.20 – Tore Kvaslerud; 58.15 – Kasper Kennedy; 59.03 – Tore Kvaslerud

Arena Nord

==== Placement matches ====
===== 5th-place match =====
16 August 2008
12:30

(Germany) Sparkasse Weissenfels	15:1	(France) Paris UC
Lasse Heiskanen – 07.11; Paavo Haimila – 10.00; Lasse Heiskanen – 15.01; Robert Blanke – 15.42; Lasse Heiskanen – 16.07; Sebastian Bernieck – 23.10; Lasse Heiskanen – 26.06; Thomas Händler – 26.20; Thomas Händler – 26.42; Thomas Händler – 29.38; Lasse Heiskanen – 30.51; Thomas Finaske – 32.54; Johannes Tauchlitz – 46.31; Johannes Tauchlitz – 50.16; Lasse Heiskanen – 58.57		42.31 – Henri Kähönen

Arena Nord

== Bratislava, Slovakia ==
=== Group B ===
==== Conference A ====
Pos	Team	Pld	W	D	L	GF	GA	GD	Pts
1	(Russia) Nizhegorodets	3	3	0	0	44	11	+33	6
2	(Slovakia) FTVS Bratislava	3	2	0	1	19	8	+11	4
3	(Austria) TVZ Wikings	3	1	0	2	28	19	+9	2
4	(Georgia (country)) Locomotive Kutaisi	3	0	0	3	6	59	−53	0

27 August 2008
13:45

(Austria) TVZ Wikings	3:7	(Russia) Nizhegorodets
Paul Rachelsperger – 10.18; Florian Haslinger – 20.10; Paul Rachelsperger – 24.49		05.41 – Ilya Nikolaev; 08.07 – Konstantin Kosolapov; 09.33 – Evgeny Yudin; 17.02 – Alexander Latukhin; 29.14 – Evgeny Yudin; 35.52 – Denis Raytsyn; 49.10 – Ilya Nikolaev

FTVS Arena

27 August 2008
19:15

(Slovakia) FTVS Bratislava	5:0 (Walkover)	(Georgia (country)) Locomotive Kutaisi

FTVS Arena

28 August 2008
13:45

(Russia) Nizhegorodets	31:3	(Georgia (country)) Locomotive Kutaisi
Alexander Latukhin – 00.42; Evgeny Yudin – 02.57; Alexander Latukhin – 03.26; Dmitry Sudakov – 04.18; Alexander Shutihin – 05.23; Evgeny Yudin – 08.57; Ilya Nikolaev – 09.42; Evgeny Yudin – 13.35; Ilya Nikolaev – 14.12; Alexander Latukhin – 16.47; Ilya Nikolaev – 18.36; Ilya Nikolaev – 20.25; Alexander Shutihin – 24.34; Ilya Nikolaev – 25.24; Evgeny Yudin – 26.43; Ilya Nikolaev – 27.18; Evgeny Yudin – 27.40; Ilya Nikolaev – 30.08; Denis Raytsyn – 31.46; Ilya Nikolaev – 40.44; Alexander Latukhin – 43.16; Konstantin Kosolapov – 44.18; Alexander Latukhin – 44.51; Alexander Latukhin – 47.58; Ilya Nikolaev – 48.40; Evgeny Yudin – 49.25; Evgeny Yudin – 52.56; Alexander Latukhin – 54.32; Ilya Nikolaev – 56.04; Mikhail Bukin – 56.39; Alexander Shutihin – 57.41		23.03 – Nikoloz Anjafaridze; 55.25 – Bachana Kobalia; 57.22 – Nikoloz Anjafaridze

FTVS Arena

28 August 2008
19:15

(Austria) TVZ Wikings	2:9	(Slovakia) FTVS Bratislava
Roland Herzog – 03.02; Marcus Jonsson – 46.05		07.23 – Juraj Svábek; 19.49 – Michal Zalibera; 23.13 – Ján Purc; 31.54 – Marek Kabát; 38.01 – Michal Zalibera; 38.58 – Ján Purc; 41.28 – Frantisek Krajcovic; 47.46 – Róbert Dolník; 58.06 – Michal Zalibera

FTVS Arena

29 August 2008
13:45

(Georgia (country)) Locomotive Kutaisi	3:23	(Austria) TVZ Wikings
Shota Giorkhelidze – 25.43; Nikoloz Anjafaridze – 27.43; Shota Giorkhelidze – 52.20		06.42 – Roland Herzog; 07.42 – Lukas Millinger; 09.28 – Marcus Jonsson; 09.41 – Paul Rachelsperger; 10.12 – Patrick Kellner; 12.27 – Christoph Hausegger; 13.21 – Stefan Sendlhofer; 13.43 – Patrick Kellner; 16.20 – Siegfried Sendlhofer; 16.51 – Marcus Jonsson; 17.05 – Paul Rachelsperger; 21.27 – Roland Herzog; 26.35 – Paul Rachelsperger; 32.16 – Andreas Sendlhofer; 32.34 – Stefan Sendlhofer; 36.53 – Marcus Jonsson; 41.23 – Claus Schichl; 41.46 – Andreas Sendlhofer; 42.14 – Stefan Sendlhofer; 49.46 – Paul Rachelsperger; 50.51 – Lukas Millinger; 58.11 – Andreas Sendlhofer; 58.25 – Lukas Millinger

FTVS Arena

29 August 2008
19:15

(Russia) Nizhegorodets	6:5	(Slovakia) FTVS Bratislava
Ilya Nikolaev – 04.35; Dmitry Sudakov – 07.40; Konstantin Kosolapov – 11.53; Konstantin Kosolapov – 21.34; Evgeny Yudin – 35.51; Alexander Latukhin – 59.46		01.34 – Marek Vlásek; 02.59 – Dominik Hancík; 10.19 – Michal Zalibera; 32.20 – Michal Liszkay; 56.42 – Frantisek Krajcovic

FTVS Arena

==== Conference B ====
Pos	Team	Pld	W	D	L	GF	GA	GD	Pts
1	(Latvia) SK Latvijas Avīze	3	3	0	0	25	7	+18	6
2	(Poland) KS Nowy Targ	3	2	0	1	19	9	+10	4
3	(Estonia) TTÜ SK	3	1	0	2	7	15	−8	2
4	(Hungary) Ares HC 94	3	0	0	3	3	23	−20	0

27 August 2008
11:00

(Hungary) Ares HC 94	1:3	(Estonia) TTÜ SK
Ádám Kupó – 09.57		07.52 – Madis Kass; 14.12 – Anre Vooremaa; 29.40 – Anre Vooremaa

FTVS Arena

27 August 2008
16:30

(Latvia) SK Latvijas Avīze	6:4	(Poland) KS Nowy Targ
Krisjanis Zeps – 02.52; Janis Anis – 14.18; Edgars Dzeguze – 29.52; Kristaps Vaicis – 44.21; Matiss Kligins – 45.19; Pavels Semjonovs – 58.33		25.22 – Bartłomiej Kułesza; 33.15 – Lesław Ossowski; 53.01 – Bartłomiej Kułesza; 59.15 – Artur Kasperek

FTVS Arena

28 August 2008
11:00

(Estonia) TTÜ SK	2:7	(Poland) KS Nowy Targ
Marek Ulman – 19.49; Marek Ulman – 27.50		01.31 – Jarosław Lech; 03.41 – Bartłomiej Augustyn; 33.28 – Bartłomiej Kułesza; 36.28 – Michał Dziurdzik; 37.59 – Michał Dziurdzik; 39.09 – Bartłomiej Kułesza; 48.47 – Bartłomiej Kułesza

FTVS Arena

28 August 2008
16:30

(Hungary) Ares HC 94	1:12	(Latvia) SK Latvijas Avīze
Krisztián Nádor – 56.57		05.03 – Edgars Dzeguze; 10.50 – Jurijs Ivenkovs; 21.42 – Renars Berzins; 23.19 – Edgars Dzeguze; 24.22 – Krisjanis Zeps; 29.11 – Maris Zicmanis; 30.41 – Krisjanis Zeps; 35.30 – Matiss Kligins; 43.54 – Kristaps Vaicis; 47.04 – Maris Zicmanis; 51.35 – Jurijs Ivenkovs; 55.29 – Matiss Kligins

FTVS Arena

29 August 2008
11:00

(Poland) KS Nowy Targ	8:1	(Hungary) Ares HC 94
Adrian Bocheński – 22.57; Łukasz Zubek – 15.56; Amadeusz Wojtak – 24.58; Łukasz Chlebda – 26.05; Michał Dziurdzik – 32.52; Artur Kasperek – 34.00; Sebastian Kwak – 49.47; Lesław Ossowski – 53.42		20.18 – Peter Szabo

FTVS Arena

29 August 2008
16:30

(Estonia) TTÜ SK	2:7	(Latvia) SK Latvijas Avīze
Armen Kasparov – 16.13; Marko Opikov – 48.51		07.40 – Pavels Semjonovs; 10.12 – Pavels Semjonovs; 16.41 – Krisjanis Zeps; 22.23 – Matiss Kligins; 24.19 – Pavels Semjonovs; 38.38 – Pavels Semjonovs; 40.51 – Maris Zicmanis

FTVS Arena

==== Playoffs ====
Semifinals
A1	(Russia) Nizhegorodets	4
B2	(Poland) KS Nowy Targ	5
B1	(Latvia) SK Latvijas Avīze	7
A2	(Slovakia) FTVS Bratislava	5

Finals
B2	(Poland) KS Nowy Targ	2
B1	(Latvia) SK Latvijas Avīze	3

===== Semi-finals =====
30 August 2008
16:00

(Russia) Nizhegorodets	4:5 (Overtime)	(Poland) KS Nowy Targ
Mikhail Bukin – 03.14; Ilya Nikolaev – 11.02; Ilya Nikolaev – 51.34; Ilya Nikolaev – 58.03		19.12 – Jarosław Lech; 36.31 – Łukasz Chlebda; 40.29 – Łukasz Zubek; 48.31 – Michał Dziurdzik; 62.21 – Lesław Ossowski

FTVS Arena

30 August 2008
19:00

(Latvia) SK Latvijas Avīze	7:5	(Slovakia) FTVS Bratislava
Maris Zicmanis – 27.45; Ivo Preiss – 30.06; Matiss Kligins – 33.39; Pavels Semjonovs – 39.00; Jurijs Ivenkovs – 46.18; Edgars Dzeguze – 49.42; Pavels Semjonovs – 50.11		11.45 – Marek Vlásek; 14.15 – Marek Kabát; 27.16 – Marek Kabát; 41.08 – Dominik Hancík; 53.49 – Adam Kalcok

FTVS Arena

===== Championship Match =====
31 August 2008
13:00

(Poland) KS Nowy Targ	2:3	(Latvia) SK Latvijas Avīze
Jarosław Lech – 18.15; Artur Kasperek – 37.35		33.24 – Maris Zicmanis; 39.59 – Edgars Dzeguze; 59.38 – Pavels Semjonovs

FTVS Arena

==== Placement matches ====
===== 7th-place match =====
30 August 2008
10:00

(Georgia (country)) Locomotive Kutaisi	0:25	(Hungary) Ares HC 94
		09.30 – Krisztián Nádor; 10.31 – Marton Eder; 11.56 – Flórián Geri; 12.48 – Peter Szabo; 16.47 – Peter Toth; 17.53 – Krisztián Nádor; 19.06 – Krisztián Nádor; 19.54 – Amartaiwan Bajaszgalan; 20.22 – Flórián Geri; 21.22 – Bence Vadócz; 21.42 – Attila Mujahid; 22.10 – Attila Dosa; 22.26 – Bence Vadócz; 22.49 – Krisztian Ban; 23.40 – Krisztián Nádor; 27.46 – Krisztián Nádor; 30.01 – Amartaiwan Bajaszgalan; 35.05 – Peter Szabo; 36.41 – Attila Hangai; 42.52 – Attila Dosa; 43.09 – Flórián Geri; 43.46 – Bence Vadócz; 47.15 – Krisztián Nádor; 55.00 – Attila Hangai; 56.21 – Peter Toth

FTVS Arena

===== 5th-place match =====
30 August 2008
13:00

(Austria) TVZ Wikings	5:10	(Estonia) TTÜ SK
Roland Herzog – 18.05; Paul Rachelsperger – 20.51; Paul Rachelsperger – 41.59; Paul Rachelsperger – 53.46; Paul Rachelsperger – 54.02		08.18 – Richard Eesmaa; 22.44 – Erlin Rand; 24.26 – Erlin Rand; 35.25 – Marek Ulman; 38.10 – Marek Ulman; 42.56 – Erlin Rand; 48.53 – Erlin Rand; 49.06 – Anre Vooremaa; 49.52 – Anre Vooremaa; 54.37 – Viljar Paulus

FTVS Arena

- Note: A third place/bronze-medal match was not played due to a scheduling conflict

== Helsinki, Finland ==
=== Group C ===
Pos	Team	Pld	W	D	L	GF	GA	GD	Pts
1	(Finland) Tapanilan Erä	2	2	0	0	10	5	+5	4
2	(Czech Republic) SSK Vitkovice	2	1	0	1	6	9	−3	2
3	(Switzerland) Floorball Köniz	2	0	0	2	8	10	−2	0

22 August 2008
18:30

(Switzerland) Floorball Köniz	4:5	(Finland) Tapanilan Erä
Samuel Dunkel – 05.56; Emanuel Antener – 13.07; Daniel Calebsson – 30.18; Emanuel Antener – 33.20		11.53 – Pasi Laitila; 13.35 – Lauri Kapanen; 21.59 – Sami Lehtinen; 32.58 – Pasi Laitila; 53.07 – Sami Lehtinen

Mosahalli

23 August 2008
17:00

(Czech Republic) SSK Vitkovice	5:4	(Switzerland) Floorball Köniz
Martin Vladar – 17.59; Martin Vladar – 36.06; Patrik Suchánek – 45.12; Martin Tokos – 53.57; Pavel Brus – 54.45		10.18 – Emanuel Antener; 13.27 – Emanuel Antener; 16.22 – Emanuel Antener; 47.13 – Emanuel Antener

Mosahalli

24 August 2008
17:00

(Finland) Tapanilan Erä	5:1	(Czech Republic) SSK Vitkovice
Lauri Kapanen – 09.15; Rein Kivi – 23.00; Lauri Kapanen – 35.40; Lauri Kapanen – 41.37; Lauri Kapanen – 51.07		39.06 – Michal Hanic

Mosahalli

Preceded by EuroFloorball Cup; 2007–08	Current: EuroFloorball Cup; 2008	Succeeded by EuroFloorball Cup; 2009
