= KS Szarotka Nowy Targ =

Floorball club in Nowy Targ, Poland

- Short name: KS Szarotka
- Founded: 1998
- Manager: (Poland) Jarosław Chlebda
- Coach: (Poland) Lesław Ossowski
- Captain: (Poland) Lesław Ossowski
- League: Ekstraliga
- Championships: 2000, 2001, 2002; 2003, 2004, 2005; 2006, 2007, 2008; 2009, 2010

KS Szarotka Nowy Targ is a floorball club based in Nowy Targ, Poland. They are 11-time Ekstraliga champions. KS Szarotka maintains a strong rivalry with the other floorball team from their city, KS Górale Nowy Targ.

KS Szarotka, as winners of the Polish Floorball League, took part in the 2008 EuroFloorball Cup. They were narrowly defeated in qualifying by SK Latvijas Avīze, and knocked out of competition, missing qualification to the finals by one goal.

== Roster ==
Updated 31 August 2008

Goalkeepers
| Nationality | Number | Player name | Date of birth |
|---|---|---|---|
| (Poland) | — | Mateusz Kudła | — |
| (Poland) | 1 | Wojciech Batkiewicz | 26 February 1980 |
| (Poland) | 33 | Michał Karaś | 26 January 1980 |

Defensemen
| Nationality | Number | Player name | Date of birth |
|---|---|---|---|
| (Poland) | 5 | Jarosław Lech | 9 September 1981 |
| (Poland) | 6 | Michał Dziurdzik | 24 May 1987 |
| (Poland) | 11 | Piotr Ligas | 11 May 1988 |
| (Poland) | 14 | Artur Kasperek | 23 March 1984 |
| (Poland) | 16 | Radosław Budzoń | 27 February 1988 |
| (Poland) | 17 | Sebastian Kwak | 19 July 1988 |

Forwards
| Nationality | Number | Player name | Date of birth |
|---|---|---|---|
| (Poland) | — | Marcin Borkowski | 22 March 1990 |
| (Poland) | — | Kamil Chrobak | 17 September 1983 |
| (Poland) | 2 | Mateusz Stopiak | 31 January 1992 |
| (Poland) | 4 | Amadeusz Wojtak | 30 May 1990 |
| (Poland) | 7 | Bartłomiej Kułesza | 23 March 1986 |
| (Poland) | 8 | Lesław Ossowski – C | 8 April 1981 |
| (Poland) | 9 | Łukasz Chlebda | 17 December 1991 |
| (Poland) | 10 | Adrian Bocheński | 15 July 1982 |
| (Poland) | 13 | Bartłomiej Augustyn | 5 November 1987 |
| (Poland) | 15 | Mateusz Półtorak | 15 October 1985 |
| (Poland) | 18 | Łukasz Zubek | 19 June 1990 |
