= Czechoslovak Women's Volleyball Championship =

Volleyball competition

Czechoslovak Championship
- Sport: Volleyball
- Founded: 1931
- First season: 1931
- Folded: 1991
- Administrator: ČSVS
- Country: Czechoslovakia
- Continent: Europe
- Level on pyramid: 1st Level
- Domestic cup: Czechoslovak Cup
- International cups: CEV Champions League; CEV Cup; CEV Challenge Cup

The Czechoslovak Women's Volleyball Championship was an annual competition for women's volleyball teams in Czechoslovakia . The Championship were held from the year 1931 to 1992 . The most titles has been won by Praha team "Ruda Hvezda" (since 1990 "Olimp") - with 12.

The organizer of the championship was the Czechoslovak Volleyball Union (ČSVS). After the announcement of the upcoming disintegration of Czechoslovakia on January 1, 1993, ČSVS split into the Czech Volleyball Union and the Slovak Volleyball Federation. Since the 1992/93 season, independent championships of the Czech Republic and Slovakia have been held.

== Winners list ==
Years	Champions	Runners-up	Third place
1931	VVS Praha		
1932	VS Marathon Praha		
1933	VS Marathon Praha		
1934	Sokol Plzeň I		
1935	Sokol Plzeň I		
1936	Sokol Plzeň I	Vysokoškolský sport Praha	Sokol Brno
1937	Sokol Plzeň I		
1938	Competition Not Disputed		
1939	Sokol Plzeň I		
1940	Sokol Plzeň I		
1941	SK Viktoria Plzeň		
1942	SK Viktoria Plzeň		
1943	SK Viktoria Plzeň		
1944	Competition Not Disputed		
1945	SK Zaměstnanci Prahy		
1946	SK Zaměstnanci Prahy		
1947	SK Zaměstnanci Prahy		
1948	Sokol Jáma Trojice Slezská Ostrava		
1949	Sokol Pražský		
1950	Sokol Pražský	Sokol Jáma Trojice	Sokol Královo Pole
1951	Sokol OKD Ostrava		
1952	Sokol Baník Ostrava		
1953	Sokol Baník Ostrava		
1954	Tatran Valašské Meziříčí		
1955	ÚDA Praha	Slavoj Odívání	Tatran Valašské Meziříčí
1956	ÚDA Praha	Tatran Valašské Meziříčí	Slavoj Praha
1957	Slavoj Praha	Tatran Valašské Meziříčí	Dynamo Praha
1958	Tatran Valašské Meziříčí	Slavoj Praha	Slavoj Plzeň
1959	Dynamo Praha	Slavoj Praha	Valašské Meziříčí
1960	Slavoj Plzeň MP	Dynamo Praha	Spartak Královo Pole Brno
1961	Tatran Střešovice	Dynamo Praha	Slávia Bratislava UK
1962	Dynamo Praha	Tatran Střešovice	Slávia Bratislava UK
1963	Dynamo Praha	ČKD Praha	Tatran Střešovice
1964	ČKD Praha	Slávia Bratislava UK	SK Slávia Praha
1965	SK Slávia Praha	Slávia Bratislava UK	Jiskra Jablonec
1966	Slávia Bratislava UK	Jiskra Jablonec	Tatran Střešovice
1967	Slávia Bratislava UK	SK Slávia Praha	Slavoj Praha
1968	Slávia Bratislava UK	Tatran Střešovice	Slavoj Praha
1969	Tatran Střešovice	VŠ Bratislava	SK Slávia Praha
1970	Tatran Střešovice	Slávia Bratislava UK	Rudá Hvězda Praha
1971	Tatran Střešovice	Slávia Bratislava UK	Technika Brno
1972	Tatran Střešovice		
1973	Tatran Střešovice		
1974	Rudá Hvězda Praha		
1975	Rudá Hvězda Praha		
1976	Slávia Bratislava UK		
1977	Rudá Hvězda Praha		
1978	Slávia Bratislava UK		
1979	Rudá Hvězda Praha		
1980	Rudá Hvězda Praha	Slávia Bratislava UK	Lokomotiva Liberec
1981	Rudá Hvězda Praha	Slávia Bratislava UK	Lokomotiva Liberec
1982	Slávia Bratislava UK	Rudá Hvězda Praha	Lokomotiva Liberec
1983	Slávia Bratislava UK	Rudá Hvězda Praha	KPS Brno
1984	Rudá Hvězda Praha	Slávia UK Bratislava	Lokomotiva Liberec
1985	Rudá Hvězda Praha	Slávia UK Bratislava	Červená Hviezda Bratislava
1986	Rudá Hvězda Praha	Slávia UK Bratislava	Slávia Praha IPS
1987	Rudá Hvězda Praha	Slávia UK Bratislava	Jiskra Textilana Liberec
1988	Rudá Hvězda Praha	Slávia UK Bratislava	Slávia Praha IPS
1989	Slávia UK Bratislava	Rudá Hvězda Praha	Slávia Praha IPS
1990	KPS Brno	Slávia UK Bratislava	Červená Hviezda Bratislava
1991	TJ Slávia UK Bratislava	TJ KPS Brno	PSK Olymp Praha
1992	PSK Olymp Praha	TJ KPS Brno	SK Slavia Praha
