= Extraleague =

Extraleague may refer to:

- Floorball
  - Ekstraliga (men's floorball), the top league in Poland
- Football
  - Ekstraliga (women's football), the top women's league in Poland
- Ice hockey
  - Belarusian Extraleague, the top league in Belarus
  - Czech Extraliga, the top league in Czech Republic
  - Slovak Extraliga, the top league in Slovakia
- Rugby union
  - KB Extraliga, the top league in Czech Republic
  - Ekstraliga (rugby), the top league in Poland
- Speedway
  - Speedway Ekstraliga, the top level league in Poland
  - Speedway 2. Ekstraliga, the second level league in Poland
