= Magnus Svensson =

Magnus Svensson may refer to:

- Magnus Svensson (floorball) (born 1983), floorball player
- Magnus Svensson (footballer) (born 1969), football player
- Magnus Svensson (ice hockey b. 1963) (born 1963), ice hockey player
- Magnus Pääjärvi-Svensson (born 1991), ice hockey player

== See also ==
- Svensson
