= 2007–08 Men's EuroFloorball Cup qualifying =

2007–08 Men's EuroFloorball Cup
Qualifying tournaments

Tournament details
- Host countries: Norway; Italy; Czech Republic
- Venues: 3 (in 3 host cities)
- Dates: 29 August – 9 September 2007
- Teams: 15 (from 15 countries)

Final positions
- Champions: (Norway) Fjerdingby IBK (Italy) Viking Roma FC (Finland) SC Classic

Tournament statistics
- Matches played: 27
- Goals scored: 433 (16.04 per match)
- All statistics correct as of 20:35, 27 June 2008 (UTC); Note: 'Matches played' includes all qualification matches.

The 2007–08 Men's EuroFloorball Cup Qualifying rounds took place over 29 August – 9 September 2007 in three different host nations. The winner of each group advanced to the 2007–08 Men's EuroFloorball Cup Finals, where they had a chance to win the EuroFloorball Cup for 2007–08. A total of 15 teams played in the qualifying round, all from different countries.

The 2007–08 EuroFloorball Cup marked the first year in which the new name for the tournament was used (previously known as the European Cup). The tournament also marked its 15th year, which was a huge achievement for the International Floorball Federation.

== Qualification format ==
Since the top four nations at the 2006–07 Men's EuroFloorball Cup were from Sweden, Finland, Switzerland, and the Czech Republic, the top team in that country automatically advances straight into the final round. In addition to that, the reigning champions receive automatic qualification into the final round as well. 5 teams in total receive automatic qualification.

Since 5 of the 8 spots are filled, the other three need to be decided using regional qualification. In Group C, the runners-up to the top team in Sweden, Finland, Switzerland, and the Czech Republic play for a spot in the finals. In the 2007–08 EuroFloorball Cup, both the top team in Sweden and the runners-up automatically qualified for the tournament, and therefore Group C consisted of 3 teams instead of 4. In Groups A and B, the teams are split into regions: West Europe and East Europe, respectively. The winning team in each group advances to the finals, making the total number of teams eight.

To be eligible to take part in the 2007–08 Men's EuroFloorball Cup, teams that take place in regional qualification must capture the national title in floorball in their country. If that team does not register, then the 2nd place team can register, and so forth.

Winning teams (qualify for EuroFloorball Cup Finals)
Group A (West Europe)	Group B (East Europe)	Group C (runners-up)
Norway Fjerdingby IBK	Italy Viking Roma FC	Finland SC Classic

== Qualifying Venues ==
Group A qualifications for Western Europe took place in Bærum, Norway from 29 August – 2 September 2007.
Group B qualifications for Eastern Europe took place in Ciampino, Italy from 5 to 9 September 2007.
Group C qualifications took place in Liberec, Czech Republic from 7 to 9 September 2007.

== Bærum, Norway ==
=== Group A ===
==== Conference A ====
Pos	Team	Pld	W	D	L	GF	GA	GD	Pts
1	Norway Fjerdingby IBK	2	2	0	0	41	3	+38	4
2	Netherlands FB Agents	2	1	0	1	17	35	−18	2
3	United Kingdom Cotswold Cobras	2	0	0	2	5	25	−20	0

29 August 2007

Netherlands FB Agents	2–31	Norway Fjerdingby IBK

Rykkinn Sports Arena, Bærum

30 August 2007

United Kingdom Cotswold Cobras	4–15	Netherlands FB Agents

Rykkinn Sports Arena, Bærum

31 August 2007

Norway Fjerdingby IBK	10–1	United Kingdom Cotswold Cobras

Rykkinn Sports Arena, Bærum

==== Conference B ====
Pos	Team	Pld	W	D	L	GF	GA	GD	Pts
1	Russia DRS Archangelsk	3	3	0	0	52	10	+42	6
2	Estonia TTÜ SK	3	2	0	1	37	20	+17	4
3	Spain CUF Leganes	3	1	0	2	27	32	−5	2
4	Belgium Waterloo Lions	3	0	0	3	11	65	−54	0

29 August 2007

Estonia TTÜ SK	23–5	Belgium Waterloo Lions

Rykkinn Sports Arena, Bærum

Russia DRS Archangelsk	20–2	Spain CUF Leganes

Rykkinn Sports Arena, Bærum

30 August 2007

Belgium Waterloo Lions	4–19	Spain CUF Leganes

Rykkinn Sports Arena, Bærum

Estonia TTÜ SK	6–9	Russia DRS Archangelsk

Rykkinn Sports Arena, Bærum

31 August 2007

Belgium Waterloo Lions	2–23	Russia DRS Archangelsk

Rykkinn Sports Arena, Bærum

Spain CUF Leganes	6–8	Estonia TTÜ SK

Rykkinn Sports Arena, Bærum

==== Playoffs ====
Semifinals
A1	Norway Fjerdingby IBK	8
B2	Estonia TTÜ SK	2
B1	Russia DRS Archangelsk	22
A2	Netherlands FB Agents	6

Finals
A1	Norway Fjerdingby IBK	10
B1	Russia DRS Archangelsk	5

===== Semi-finals =====
1 September 2007

Norway Fjerdingby IBK	8–2	Estonia TTÜ SK

Rykkinn Sports Arena, Bærum

Russia DRS Archangelsk	22–6	Netherlands FB Agents

Rykkinn Sports Arena, Bærum

===== Bronze-medal match =====
2 September 2007

Estonia TTÜ SK	8–3	Netherlands FB Agents

Rykkinn Sports Arena, Bærum

===== Championship match =====
2 September 2007

Norway Fjerdingby IBK	10–5	Russia DRS Archangelsk

Rykkinn Sports Arena, Bærum

==== Placement matches ====
===== 5th-place match =====
1 September 2007

United Kingdom Cotswold Cobras	1–6	Spain CUF Leganes

Rykkinn Sports Arena, Bærum

== Ciampino, Italy ==
=== Group B ===
Pos	Team	Pld	W	D	L	GF	GA	GD	Pts
1	Italy Viking Roma FC	4	4	0	0	38	12	+26	8
2	Denmark Bulldogs FC	4	3	0	1	27	18	+9	6
3	Latvia Latvijas Avize	4	2	0	2	37	14	+23	4
4	Slovakia FBC Dragons	4	1	0	3	22	25	−3	2
5	Hungary Debreceni FSE	4	0	0	4	6	61	−55	0

5 September 2007

Hungary Debreceni FSE	2–16	Italy Viking Roma FC

Palazetto dello Sport, Ciampino

Denmark Bulldogs FC	8–6	Slovakia FBC Dragons

Palazetto dello Sport, Ciampino

6 September 2007

Italy Viking Roma FC	9–2	Denmark Bulldogs FC

Palazetto dello Sport, Ciampino

Latvia Latvijas Avize	21–2	Hungary Debreceni FSE

Palazetto dello Sport, Ciampino

7 September 2007

Hungary Debreceni FSE	1–13	Denmark Bulldogs FC

Palazetto dello Sport, Ciampino

Slovakia FBC Dragons	2–9	Latvia Latvijas Avize

Palazetto dello Sport, Ciampino

8 September 2007

Slovakia FBC Dragons	11–1	Hungary Debreceni FSE

Palazetto dello Sport, Ciampino

Latvia Latvijas Avize	5–6	Italy Viking Roma FC

Palazetto dello Sport, Ciampino

9 September 2007

Italy Viking Roma FC	7–3	Slovakia FBC Dragons

Palazetto dello Sport, Ciampino

Denmark Bulldogs FC	4–2	Latvia Latvijas Avize

Palazetto dello Sport, Ciampino

== Liberec, Czech Republic ==
=== Group C ===
Pos	Team	Pld	W	D	L	GF	GA	GD	Pts
1	Finland SC Classic	2	1	1	0	25	3	+22	3
2	Switzerland Tigers Langnau	2	1	1	0	14	4	+10	3
3	Czech Republic Torpedo Havířov	2	0	0	2	3	35	−32	0

7 September 2007

Switzerland Tigers Langnau	2–2	Finland SC Classic

Liberec, Czech Republic

8 September 2007

Czech Republic Torpedo Havířov	2–12	Switzerland Tigers Langnau

Liberec, Czech Republic

9 September 2007

Finland SC Classic	23–1	Czech Republic Torpedo Havířov

Liberec, Czech Republic

== See also ==
- 2007–08 Men's EuroFloorball Cup Finals

Preceded by European Cup; 2006–07	Current: EuroFloorball Cup; 2007–08	Succeeded by EuroFloorball Cup; 2008
