= Peter Sjögren =

Swedish floorball player (born 1983)

Peter Sjögren (born in 1983) is a Swedish floorball player (goalkeeper) who is ranked as the best goalie in the world. Sjögren, who plays in Warbergs IC, won the Swedish Championship in 2006, 2007 and 2008. He also won the World Cup in 2006 (3rd goalie).
