= 2005–06 Men's EuroFloorball Cup qualifying =

2005–06 Men's European Cup
Qualifying Rounds

Tournament details
- Host country: Denmark
- Venue: 1 (in 1 host city)
- Dates: 3–7 August 2005
- Teams: 11 (from 11 countries)

Final positions
- Champions: (Latvia) Rubene (Russia) Nizhegorodets

Tournament statistics
- Matches played: 25
- Goals scored: 329 (13.16 per match)
- All statistics correct as of 22:13, 23 August 2008 (UTC).

The 2005–06 Men's EuroFloorball Cup Qualifying rounds took place over 3 to 7 August 2005 in Aalborg, Denmark. The top 2 teams advanced to the 2005–06 Men's EuroFloorball Cup Finals where they had a chance to win the EuroFloorball Cup for 2005–06.

The tournament was known as the 2005–06 Men's European Cup, but due to name implications, is now known as the 2005–06 Men's EuroFloorball Cup.

== Qualifying results ==
=== Division A ===
Pos	Team	Pld	W	D	L	GF	GA	GD	Pts
1	(Latvia) Rubene	4	4	0	0	38	20	+18	8
2	(Austria) TVZ Wikings	4	3	0	1	20	14	+6	6
3	(Estonia) TTÜ SK	4	2	0	2	26	12	+14	4
4	(Slovakia) Hurikan Bratislava	4	1	0	3	12	24	−12	2
5	(Netherlands) HSK den Haag	4	0	0	4	10	37	−27	0

3 August 2005

(Latvia) Rubene	18–3	(Netherlands) HSK den Haag

Aalborg Parken

(Estonia) TTÜ SK	1–3	(Austria) TVZ Wikings

Aalborg Parken

4 August 2005

(Slovakia) Hurikan Bratislava	6–7	(Latvia) Rubene

Aalborg Parken

(Netherlands) HSK den Haag	2–11	(Estonia) TTÜ SK

Aalborg Parken

5 August 2005

(Austria) TVZ Wikings	6–3	(Slovakia) Hurikan Bratislava

Aalborg Parken

(Latvia) Rubene	6–5	(Estonia) TTÜ SK

Aalborg Parken

6 August 2005

(Slovakia) Hurikan Bratislava	3–2	(Netherlands) HSK den Haag

Aalborg Parken

(Austria) TVZ Wikings	6–7	(Latvia) Rubene

Aalborg Parken

7 August 2005

(Estonia) TTÜ SK	9–1	(Slovakia) Hurikan Bratislava

Aalborg Parken

(Netherlands) HSK den Haag	3–5	(Austria) TVZ Wikings

Aalborg Parken

=== Division B ===
Pos	Team	Pld	W	D	L	GF	GA	GD	Pts
1	(Russia) Nizhegorodets	5	5	0	0	93	11	+82	10
2	(Germany) Sparkasse Weissenfels	5	4	0	1	63	13	+50	8
3	(Hungary) Dunai Krokodilok	5	3	0	2	28	44	−16	6
4	(United Kingdom) Cotswold Cobras	5	2	0	3	20	49	−29	4
5	(Italy) Viking Roma FC	5	1	0	4	13	57	−44	2
6	(Belgium) IBN Brussels	5	0	0	5	10	53	−43	0

3 August 2005

(Germany) Sparkasse Weissenfels	17–0	(Belgium) IBN Brussels

Aalborg Parken

(United Kingdom) Cotswold Cobras	3–21	(Russia) Nizhegorodets

Aalborg Parken

(Hungary) Dunai Krokodilok	9–1	(Italy) Viking Roma FC

Aalborg Parken

4 August 2005

(Russia) Nizhegorodets	9–5	(Germany) Sparkasse Weissenfels

Aalborg Parken

(Belgium) IBN Brussels	4–7	(Hungary) Dunai Krokodilok

Aalborg Parken

(Italy) Viking Roma FC	6–7	(United Kingdom) Cotswold Cobras

Aalborg Parken

5 August 2005

(Hungary) Dunai Krokodilok	1–22	(Russia) Nizhegorodets

Aalborg Parken

(Belgium) IBN Brussels	3–4	(Italy) Viking Roma FC

Aalborg Parken

(Germany) Sparkasse Weissenfels	11–1	(United Kingdom) Cotswold Cobras

Aalborg Parken

6 August 2005

(Russia) Nizhegorodets	19–0	(Belgium) IBN Brussels

Aalborg Parken

(United Kingdom) Cotswold Cobras	3–8	(Hungary) Dunai Krokodilok

Aalborg Parken

(Italy) Viking Roma FC	0–16	(Germany) Sparkasse Weissenfels

Aalborg Parken

7 August 2005

(Russia) Nizhegorodets	22–2	(Italy) Viking Roma FC

Aalborg Parken

(Germany) Sparkasse Weissenfels	14–3	(Hungary) Dunai Krokodilok

Aalborg Parken

(Belgium) IBN Brussels	3–6	(United Kingdom) Cotswold Cobras

Aalborg Parken

== See also ==
- 2005–06 Men's EuroFloorball Cup Finals

Preceded by EuroFloorball Cup; 2004–05	Current: EuroFloorball Cup; 2005–06	Succeeded by EuroFloorball Cup; 2006–07
