= AIK Innebandy =

Swedish floorball club

- Nickname(s): AIK IBF
- Founded: 1996
- Arena: Solnahallen
- Capacity: 2,000
- Manager: Richard Markstedt
- Coach: Dennis Ericsson Freij
- Captain: (Sweden) Hampus Pettersson
- League: Herrar Allsvenskan Norra
- Championships: SSL (2006, 2009); EuroFloorball Cup (2006–07, 2007–08, 2008)
Home colors	Away colors

AIK Innebandy (often referred to as AIK IBF or simply AIK) is a Swedish floorball club and a department of AIK. The men's team played in Sweden's highest division, SSL, from the year 2000, but was relegated to Herrar Allsvenskan Norra in 2018 after ending the season 2017/2018 as second last. AIK won their first championship in 2006 when they defeated Pixbo IBK in the SSL final. In 2009 they won their second championship, beating Warberg IC in the final. The team is back in Sweden’s highest division SSL the season 2022/2023.

== History ==
=== Pre-Svenska Superligan ===
AIK Innebandy was founded in 1996. In their debut season, 1996–97, AIK played in the Swedish 1st division. They were directly relegated to the Swedish 2nd division for the 1997–98 season, and although they won the division, a change in format resulted in them having to play in the same division for the 1998–99 season.

In the 1999–00 season, AIK won their division once again and were promoted to the 1st division. After winning the 1st division, AIK was finally promoted to the Svenska Superligan for the 2000–01 season.

=== Svenska Superligan ===
The inaugural season in the Svenska Superligan saw AIK set new attendance records for league matches. In a match against the then reigning Swedish champions, Haninge IBK, a total of 3,000 spectators attended, setting a new record (at the time). AIK won this match, 3:2. In their first season, AIK would make the playoffs, only to lose in the quarterfinals 3:1 in a best-of-5 series against Balrog IK.

The second season brought AIK more success, as they would win 21 out of 30 matches, and win their first quarterfinal. However, they lost to Balrog IK again, this time in the semi-finals. The 2002–03 season also saw Balrog IK meet AIK in the playoffs, where after taking a 2:0 series lead, AIK would lose 3 straight matches.

The following season (2003–04) saw AIK Innebandy go all the way to the final, only to lose to rivals Balrog IK 6:5 in the championship match. After another great season, AIK would go to the finals once more, but lose again, this time to Warberg IC. The 2005–06 season saw AIK go to the finals for the third straight year, and finally win against Pixbo IBK by a score of 6:2 in front of 12,987 spectators at the Globen in Stockholm, Sweden. This was AIK's only Svenska Superligan title to date.

2006-07 saw AIK lose to Caperio/Täby FC in the quarterfinals. The 3:1 loss in the best-of-5 series was regarded as one of the biggest upsets in Swedish floorball history. The next season saw AIK visit the finals again, only to lose to reigning champions, Warberg IC 5:4.

In 2009 they won the league again by beating Warberg.

=== EuroFloorball Cup ===
AIK Innebandy has enjoyed huge success at the EuroFloorball Cup competitions. During the 2006–07 EuroFloorball Cup, AIK defeated Warberg IC 6:5 to win their first European championship. They then repeated the feat in 2007–08, beating Warberg IC once again, 2:1 in overtime, in a rematch of both the 2006–07 EuroFloorball Cup and the 2007–08 Svenska Superligan final.

The 2008 EuroFloorball Cup saw AIK win once again; this time against Swiss team SV Wiler-Ersigen. AIK became the only team to ever win the EuroFloorball Cup three consecutive times, and became the third team to ever capture the championship three times (Balrog IK, Warberg IC).
