= Ekstraliga (men's floorball) =

- Current season, competition or edition: 2026–27 Ekstraliga
- Sport: Floorball
- Founded: 1997; 29 years ago
- Administrator: Polski Unihokej
- No. of teams: 8
- Country: Poland
- Most recent champion: UKS Bankówka Zielonka (8th title) (2025–26)
- Most titles: KS Szarotka Nowy Targ (11 titles)
- Sponsor: Salming
- Relegation to: I liga
- Domestic cup: Polish Cup
- International cup: EuroFloorball Cup
- Website: polskiunihokej.pl

Ekstraliga (Polish: Ekstraliga polska w unihokeju mężczyzn) is the highest league in the league system of Polish floorball and comprises the top 8 Polish floorball teams. The league was founded as I liga mężczyzn in 1997 by the Polish Floorball Federation (PZU). It was renamed to Ekstraliga for the 2009–10 season. The season ends with a play-off and a final.

The champion of the league is eligible to compete at the EuroFloorball Cup.

== Format ==
=== Regular season ===
The regular season is played in a round robin format with each team playing 14 games. The total number of regular season games is 56. The four teams that finish the regular season at the top of the standings qualify for the playoffs in the spring.

=== Playoffs ===
The top eight teams from the regular season play for the Polish Champion. The first placed team from the regular season plays with fourth, the second placed team plays with third. The playoffs are played in best-of-three format.

== Teams ==
Location of the 2024–25 Ekstraliga teams.

Teams participating in the 2024–25 season:

Team	2024–25 finish
UKS Bankówka Zielonka	1st
SKS Olimpia Łochów	2nd
JohnnyBros Olimpia Osowa Gdańsk	3rd
Regen Project Floorball Team Poznań	4th
Smoki Kraków	5th
KS Gorący Potok Szarotka Nowy Targ	6th
AZS PŁ Cochise Łódź	7th
AZS Politechnika Lubelska	8th

== Champions ==
List of champions in seasons of the league:

- 1998 – Dajar's Team Warszawa
- 1999 – Podhale Nowy Targ
- 2000 – KS Szarotka Nowy Targ
- 2001 – KS Szarotka Nowy Targ
- 2002 – KS Szarotka Nowy Targ
- 2003 – KS Szarotka Nowy Targ
- 2004 – KS Szarotka Nowy Targ
- 2005 – KS Szarotka Nowy Targ
- 2006 – KS Szarotka Nowy Targ
- 2007 – KS Szarotka Nowy Targ
- 2008 – KS Szarotka Nowy Targ
- 2009 – KS Szarotka Nowy Targ
- 2010 – KS Szarotka Nowy Targ
- 2011 – KS Górale Nowy Targ
- 2012 – KS Górale Nowy Targ
- 2013 – KS Górale Nowy Targ
- 2014 – UKS Bankówka Zielonka
- 2015 – KS Górale Nowy Targ
- 2016 – KS Górale Nowy Targ
- 2017 – UKS Bankówka Zielonka
- 2018 – KS Górale Nowy Targ
- 2019 – KS Górale Nowy Targ
- 2020 – KS Górale Nowy Targ
- 2021 – UKS Bankówka Zielonka
- 2022 – UKS Bankówka Zielonka
- 2023 – UKS Bankówka Zielonka
- 2024 – UKS Bankówka Zielonka
- 2025 – UKS Bankówka Zielonka
- 2026 – UKS Bankówka Zielonka

== General classification ==
Season	Champions	Runner-up	Third place
1997–98	Dajar's Team Warszawa	Old Boys Podhale	KS Szarotka Nowy Targ
1998–99	Podhale Nowy Targ	KS Szarotka Nowy Targ	Old Boys Nowy Targ
1999–2000	KS Szarotka Nowy Targ	Podhale Nowy Targ	Elhok Elbląg
2000–01	KS Szarotka Nowy Targ	UKS Absolwent Siedlec	Elhok Elbląg
2001–02	KS Szarotka Nowy Targ	UKS Absolwent Siedlec	KS Górale Nowy Targ
2002–03	KS Szarotka Nowy Targ	UKS Absolwent Siedlec	KS Górale Nowy Targ
2003–04	KS Szarotka Nowy Targ	UKS Absolwent Siedlec	KS Górale Nowy Targ
2004–05	KS Szarotka Nowy Targ	KS Górale Nowy Targ	UKS Absolwent Siedlec
2005–06	KS Szarotka Nowy Targ	KS Górale Nowy Targ	UKS Orły Suwałki
2006–07	KS Szarotka Nowy Targ	KS Górale Nowy Targ	TKKF Pionier Jadberg Tychy
2007–08	KS Szarotka Nowy Targ	KS Górale Nowy Targ	UKS Absolwent Siedlec
2008–09	KS Szarotka Nowy Targ	KS Górale Nowy Targ	UKS Absolwent Siedlec
2009–10	KS Szarotka Nowy Targ	KS Górale Nowy Targ	UKS Bankówka Zielonka
2010–11	KS Górale Nowy Targ	KS Szarotka Nowy Targ	UKS Absolwent Siedlec
2011–12	KS Górale Nowy Targ	KS Szarotka Nowy Targ	UKS Bankówka Zielonka
2012–13	KS Górale Nowy Targ	UKS Bankówka Zielonka	KS Szarotka Nowy Targ
2013–14	UKS Bankówka Zielonka	KS Szarotka Nowy Targ	KS Górale Nowy Targ
2014–15	KS Górale Nowy Targ	UKS Bankówka Zielonka	KS Szarotka Nowy Targ
2015–16	KS Górale Nowy Targ	KS Szarotka Nowy Targ	UKS Bankówka Zielonka
2016–17	UKS Bankówka Zielonka	KS Górale Nowy Targ	KS Szarotka Nowy Targ
2017–18	KS Górale Nowy Targ	UKS Bankówka Zielonka	KS Szarotka Nowy Targ
2018–19	KS Górale Nowy Targ	KS Szarotka Nowy Targ	UKS Bankówka Zielonka
2019–20	KS Górale Nowy Targ	UKS Bankówka Zielonka	SKS Olimpia Łochów
2020–21	UKS Bankówka Zielonka	KS Szarotka Nowy Targ	UKS Floorball Gorzów
2021–22	UKS Bankówka Zielonka	KS Szarotka Nowy Targ	SKS Olimpia Łochów
2022–23	UKS Bankówka Zielonka	SKS Olimpia Łochów	KS Szarotka Nowy Targ
2023–24	UKS Bankówka Zielonka	SKS Olimpia Łochów	KS Szarotka Nowy Targ
2024–25	UKS Bankówka Zielonka	SKS Olimpia Łochów	Olimpia Osowa Gdańsk
2025–26	UKS Bankówka Zielonka	SKS Olimpia Łochów	Floorball Team Poznań

== Titles ==
Team	Titles	Season
KS Szarotka Nowy Targ	11	1999–00, 2000–01, 2001–02, 2002–03, 2003–04, 2004–05, 2005–06, 2006–07, 2007–08, 2008–09, 2009–10
UKS Bankówka Zielonka	8	2013–14, 2016–17, 2020–21, 2021–22, 2022–23, 2023–24, 2024–25, 2025–26
KS Górale Nowy Targ	8	2010–11, 2011–12, 2012–13, 2014–15, 2015–16, 2017–18, 2018–19, 2019–20
Podhale Nowy Targ	1	1998–99
Dajar's Team Warszawa	1	1997–98
