= Toni Eskelinen =

Finnish ice hockey goaltender

- Born: January 18, 1995 (age 30); Oulu, Finland
- Height: 6 ft 1 in (185 cm)
- Weight: 183 lb (83 kg; 13 st 1 lb)
- Position: Goaltender
- Catches: Left
- Liiga team Former teams: Lahti Pelicans; Oulun Kärpät
- NHL draft: Undrafted
- Playing career: 2013–present

Toni Eskelinen (born January 18, 1995) is a Finnish ice hockey goaltender. He is currently playing with Lahti Pelicans in the Finnish Liiga.

Eskelinen made his Liiga debut playing with Oulun Kärpät during the 2012–13 Liiga season.
