= Kimmo Eskelinen =

Swedish floorball player (born 1983)

Kimmo Eskelinen (born April 4, 1983) is a Swedish floorball player (defenseman) of Finnish descent. In the 2013/14 season, he plays for Partille IBS. He has played in the Swedish national team (World Cup title in 2006). He is famous for his extremely hard shot.
