= Magnus Svensson (floorball) =

Swedish floorball player (born 1983)

Lars Magnus Fredrik Svensson (born 27 May 1983 in Sweden) is a Swedish floorball player.

He is currently playing for Warberg IC, which he has played for since 2000. He has won three Swedish Championships with Warberg, in 2005, 2007 and 2008. Svensson has also won two World Championships with Sweden in 2004 and 2006. Svensson scored the game-winning goal in overtime in the 2006 final against Finland.
