= Tatran Střešovice =

Czech floorball club

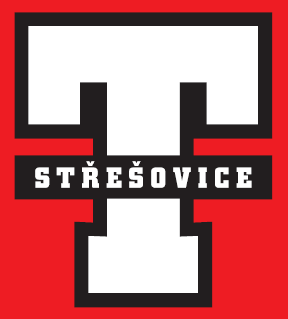
- Official logo of Tatran Střešovice
- Founded: 1991
- Arena: Men: SC Řepy; Women: Stodola Aréna Střešovice
- Coach: Men: Martin Pánek; Women: Marek Michálek
- League: Men: Superliga florbalu Women: Extraliga žen
- Championships: Men: Superliga florbalu (18 titles), Champions Cup (2024); Women: Extraliga žen (5 titles)

Tatran Střešovice is a floorball club based in Prague, Czech Republic. The team was founded in 1991.

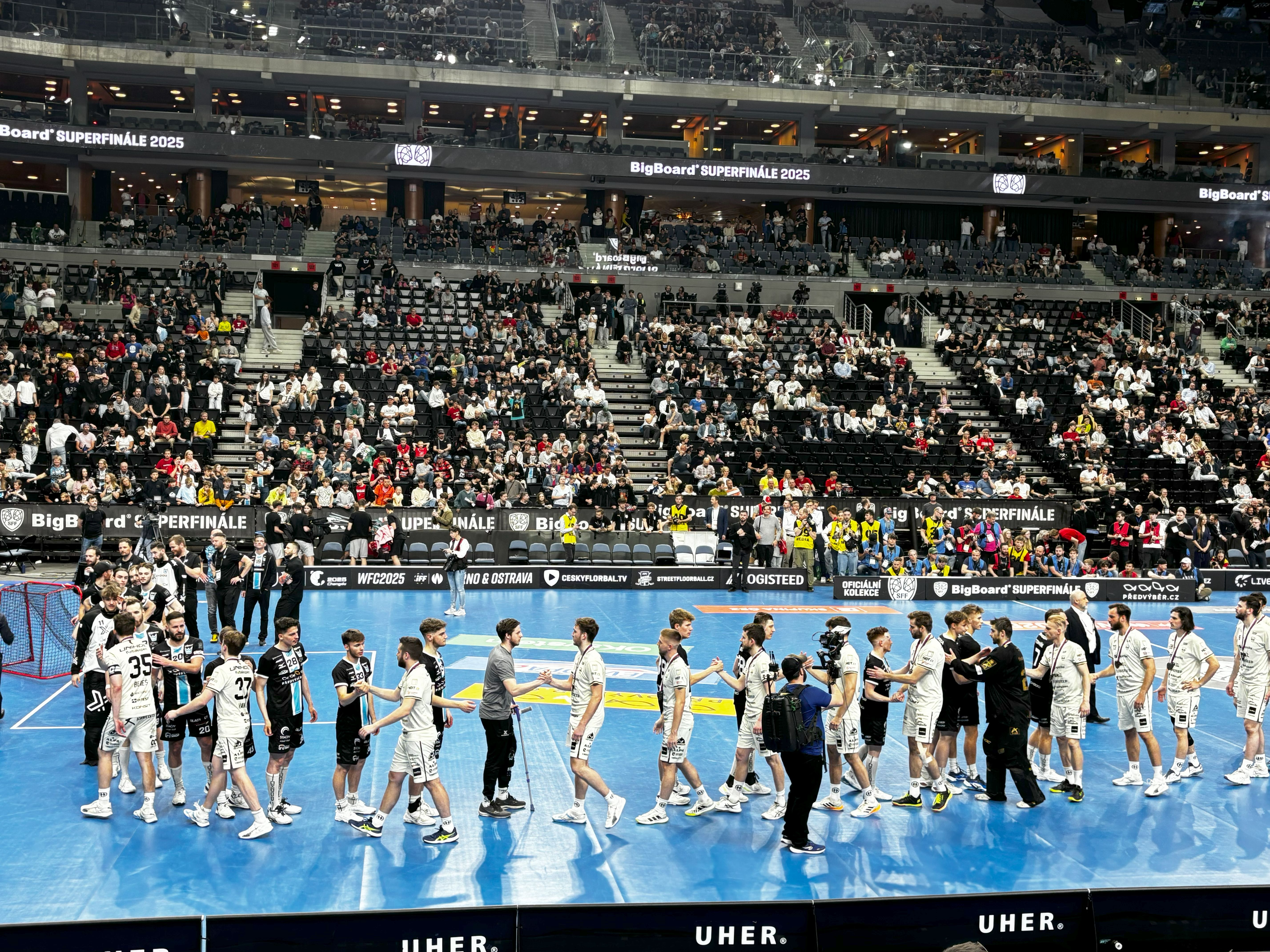
Men's team (in white) in the 2024–25 season after losing the superfinal.

The men's team has played in the highest Czech floorball league, Superliga florbalu, since its foundation in 1993. Until the 2011–12 season, the team was the dominant team of the league, winning all titles, except for the 1995–96, 1996–97, 1999–00, and 2008–09 seasons. Overall, the team won 18 titles, the last time in 2023–24 season. It makes it the most successful Czech men floorball team. In 2024, Tatran won Champions Cup as the first Czech team in the history.

Women's team also play the highest Czech floorball league, Extraliga žen. The team won the first five seasons of the league, between 1994–95 and 1998–99.

The club organizes Czech Open, one of the largest international floorball tournaments.

== Men's team ==
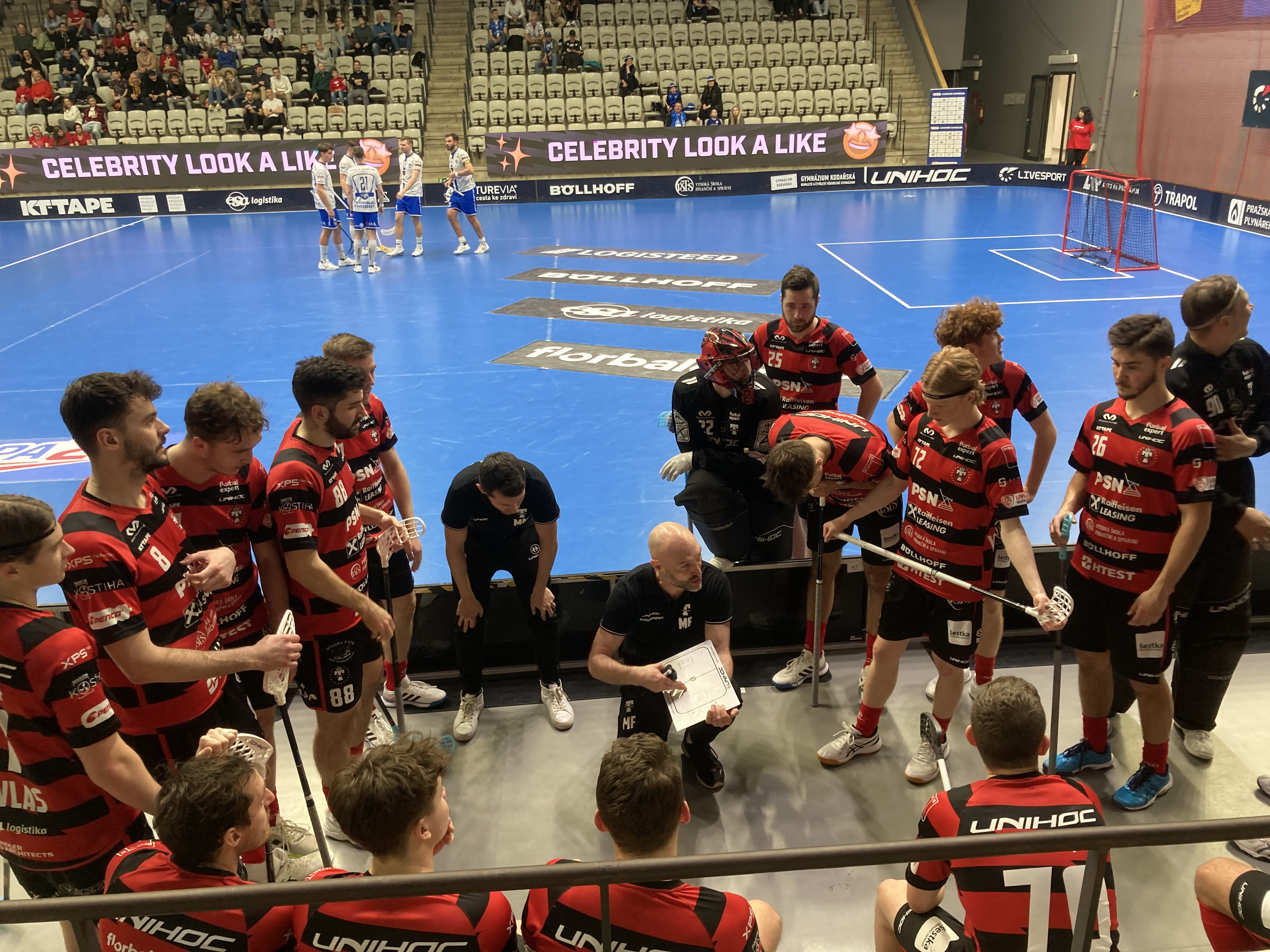
Men's team in the semifinals of the 2023–24 season.

=== Titles ===
- Superliga florbalu: 1993–94, 1994–95, 1997–98, 1998–99, 2000–01 through 2007–08, 2009–10 through 2011–12, 2014–15, 2022–23 and 2023–24
- Champions Cup: 2024

=== Recent seasons ===
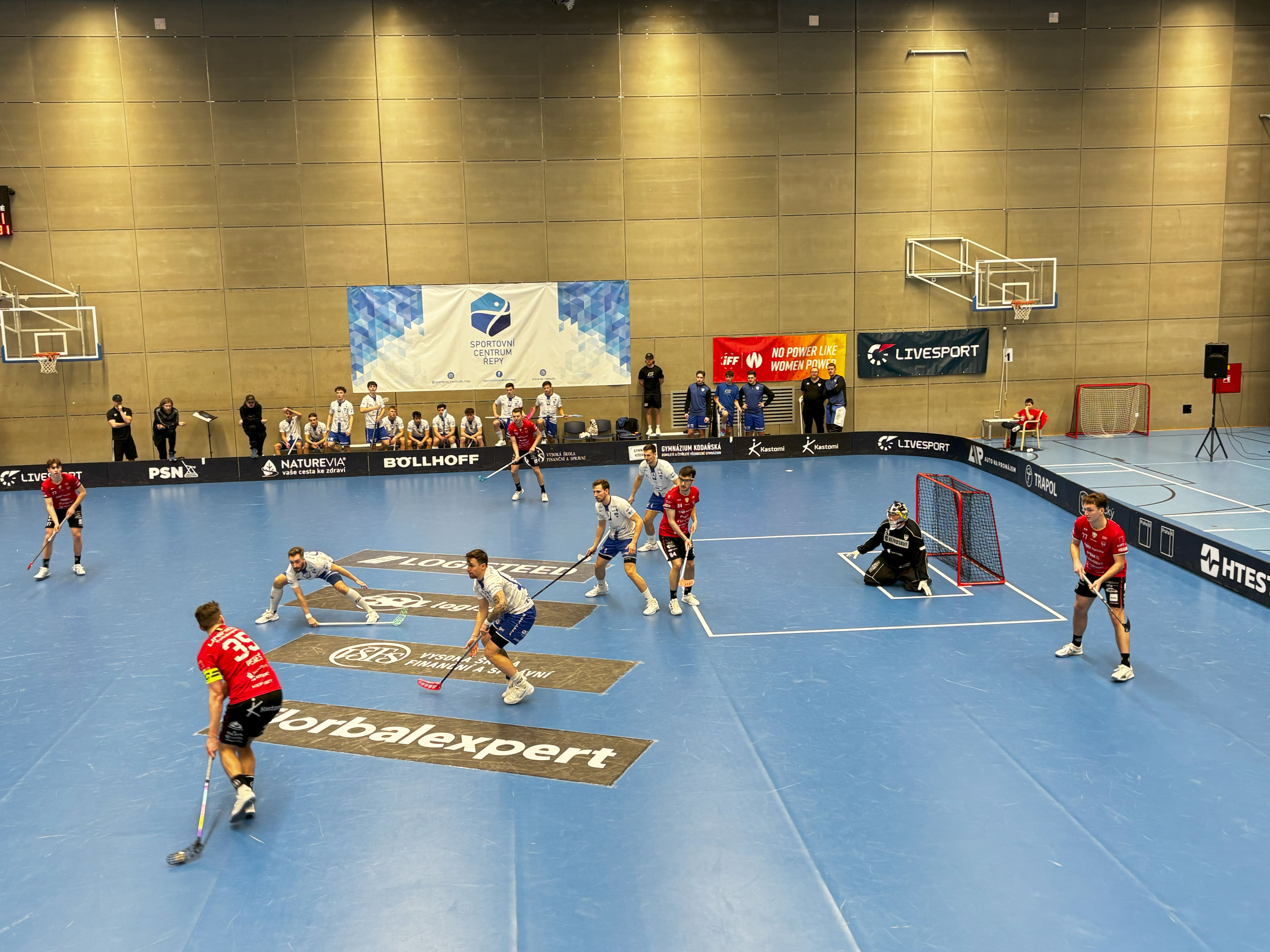
Men's team (in red) in the semifinals of the Czech Floorball Cup in 2025.

Season	Rank	Note
2020–21	6th	Quarterfinal loss to AC Sparta Praha
2021–22	2nd	Runner-up – lost to Florbal MB in final
2022–23	1st	Champions – defeated 1. SC Vítkovice in final
2023–24	1st	Champions – defeated Florbal MB in final
2024–25	2nd	Runner-up – lost to Florbal MB in final
2025–26	2nd	Runner-up – lost to Florbal MB in final

== Women's team ==
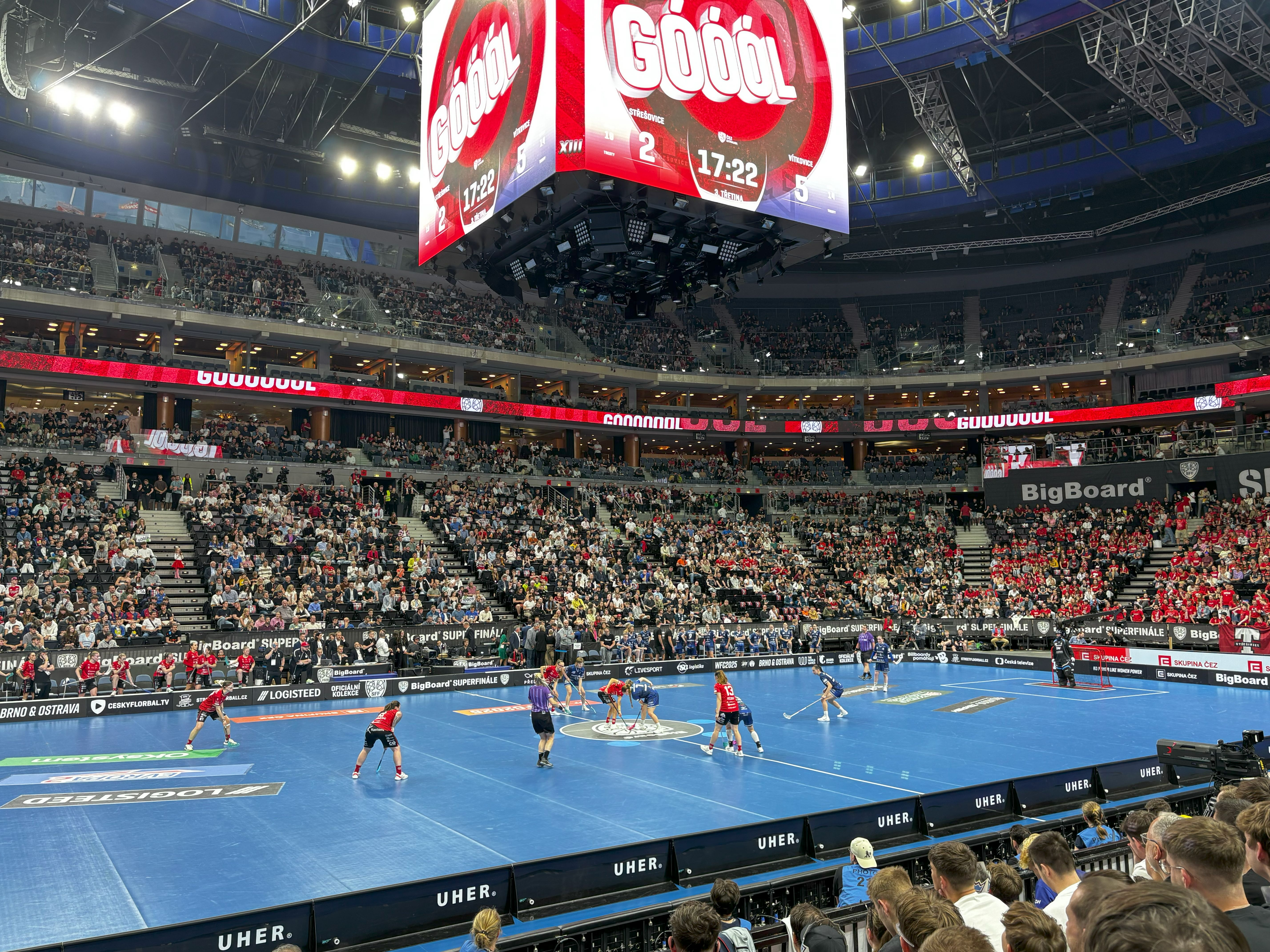
Women's team (in red) in the superfinal of the 2024–25 season.

=== Titles ===
- Extraliga žen: 1994–95 through 1998–99
- Pohár Českého florbalu žen: 2024–25, 2025–26

=== Recent seasons ===
Season	Rank	Note
2020–21	4th	Semifinal loss to Florbal Chodov
2021–22	4th	Semifinal loss to Florbal Chodov
2022–23	4th	Semifinal loss to 1. SC Vítkovice
2023–24	4th	Semifinal loss to Florbal Chodov
2024–25	2nd	Runner-up – lost to 1. SC Vítkovice in final
2025–26	3rd	Semifinal loss to Bulldogs Brno
