= SK Latvijas Avīze =

Former floorball team based in Riga, Latvia

- Founded: 1994
- Disbanded: after 2008
- League: Latvian Floorball League
- Location: Riga, Latvia
- Home ground: Olympic Sports Centre, Riga
- Colors: Yellow, Black
- Head coach: Normunds Zvejnieks
- Manager: Aldis Paegle
- Parent group: Latvijas Avīze

SK Latvijas Avīze (previously SK Lauku Avīze) was a floorball team based in Riga, Latvia playing in the Latvian Floorball League. The team in its duration was sponsored by the Latvijas Avīze newspaper.

== Goaltenders ==
- 35 (Latvia) Jāzeps Linde
- 38 (Latvia) Mārtiņš Krūms

== Defencemen ==
- 10 (Latvia) Māris Zicmanis
- 12 (Latvia) Toms Briedis
- 15 (Latvia) Alvis Veipāns
- 25 (Latvia) Edgars Dzeguze
- 33 (Latvia) Ainārs Anis
- 44 (Latvia) Jānis Anis
- 47 (Latvia) Remārs Vikānis
- 73 (Latvia) Dmitrijs Dmitrijevs

== Forwards ==
- 3 (Latvia) Pēteris Freimanis
- 4 (Latvia) Krišjānis Zeps
- 5 (Norway) Kenneth Marius Grimshei
- 8 (Latvia) Ivo Preiss
- 9 (Latvia) Uldis Purvišķis
- 13 (Latvia) Ainārs Juškēvičs
- 18 (Latvia) Toms Rutkis
- 20 (Latvia) Ritvars Rebainis
- 28 (Latvia) Jānis Kokins
- 34 (Latvia) Kārlis Bulāns
- 71 (Latvia) Gatis Miglāns
- 77 (Latvia) Andis Blinds
- 78 (Latvia) Atis Blinds (captain)
- 88 (Latvia) Oskars Kirkils
- 93 (Latvia) Krists Paulovičs
