= Warberg IC =

Swedish floorball club

- Full name: Warberg Innebandyclub
- Nickname(s): WIC
- Founded: 1985
- Arena: Sparbankshallen
- League: Men: Svenska Superligan; Women: Svenska Superligan
- Championships: SSL (1998, 2005, 2007, 2008); European Cup (1998, 1999, 2006)

Warberg Innebandyclub (often referred to as Warberg IC or WIC) is a Swedish floorball club founded in 1985. The team plays its home matches in Sparbankshallen in Varberg, which has a maximum capacity of 2,200 spectators.

The men's team plays in the Swedish Super League (SSL) as of the 2024–25 season, having returned to the top division after four years. They previously played in the top league for 27 seasons from its inception in 1990 until their relegation in 2017, and again for one season in 2019–20. It is one of the most successful teams in Swedish floorball history. They have won the highest league four times, first in 1998 and most recently in 2008. In the same period, they also won the European Cup three times.

The women's team also plays in the top league, the Swedish Super League, and has done so since the 2016–17 season. They had previously played in it for one season in 1998–99. The team has never advanced to the playoffs.

== Men's team ==
=== Recent seasons ===
Season	Rank	Note
The team played in Allsvenskan between 2017 and 2019
2019–20	13th	Relegated
The team played in Allsvenskan between 2020 and 2024
2024–25	11th	
2025–26	10th	

=== European Cup ===
Tournament	Rank	Note
1998 European Cup	1st	Champions – defeated (Finland) Viikingit in final
1999 European Cup	1st	Champions – defeated (Sweden) Haninge IBK in final
2005–06 European Cup	1st	Champions – defeated (Finland) SSV Helsinki in final
2006–07 European Cup	2nd	Runner-up – lost to (Sweden) AIK in final
2007–08 Euro Floorball Cup	2nd	Runner-up – lost to (Sweden) AIK in final
2008 Euro Floorball Cup	4th	Lost third-place match to (Finland) SSV Helsinki
