= 2007 Czech Open =

Fortuna Czech Open 2007
Male Elite Division
- Official Logo of the 2007 Czech Open

Tournament details
- Host country: Czech Republic
- Venues: 3 (in 1 host city)
- Dates: 16–19 August 2007
- Teams: 16 (from 6 countries)

Final positions
- Champions: SSV Helsinki (1st title)
- Runners-up: IBK Dalen
- Semifinalists: SV Wiler-Ersigen; Tapanilan Erä

Tournament statistics
- Matches played: 45
- Goals scored: 265 (5.89 per match)
- Scoring leader(s): Jani Kukkola, Santtu Manner (12 points)

Awards
- MVP: Tero Tiitu (SSV Helsinki)
- All statistics correct as of 18:31, 11 June 2008 (UTC).

The 2007 Czech Open was the fifteenth edition of the Czech Open international floorball tournament. It was held in 2007 in Prague, Czech Republic. It was won by SSV Helsinki, ending a 6-year 'streak' where a Swedish team has won the tournament. No bronze medal match or placement matches were played.

== Tournament results ==
=== Round Robin ===
==== Group A ====
Team	GP	W	D	L	GF	GA	PTS
Pixbo Wallenstam IBK	3	3	0	0	13	3	6
FBK Sokol Mladá Boleslav	3	2	0	1	8	6	4
Tapanilan Erä	3	1	0	2	7	6	2
Bulldogs Brno	3	0	0	3	4	17	0

16 August 2007

FBK Sokol Mladá Boleslav	4–2	Bulldogs Brno

Vinohrady, Prague

Tapanilan Erä	1–2	Pixbo Wallenstam IBK

Sparta Arena, Prague

Pixbo Wallenstam IBK	7–1	Bulldogs Brno

Sparta Arena, Prague

Tapanilan Erä	0–3	FBK Sokol Mladá Boleslav

Sparta Arena, Prague

17 August 2007

Pixbo Wallenstam IBK	4–1	FBK Sokol Mladá Boleslav

Sparta Arena, Prague

Bulldogs Brno	1–6	Tapanilan Erä

Vinohrady, Prague

==== Group B ====
Team	GP	W	D	L	GF	GA	PTS
SSK Future	3	2	1	0	7	3	5
SSV Helsinki	3	2	0	1	11	5	4
FBC Pepino Ostrava	3	1	1	1	6	9	3
Nizhegorodets	3	0	0	3	3	10	0

16 August 2007

FBC Pepino Ostrava	2–1	Nizhegorodets

Vinohrady, Prague

SSV Helsinki	0–2	SSK Future

Sparta Arena, Prague

SSK Future	2–2	FBC Pepino Ostrava

Sparta Arena, Prague

Nizhegorodets	1–5	SSV Helsinki

Sparta Arena, Prague

17 August 2007

SSV Helsinki	6–2	FBC Pepino Ostrava

Sparta Arena, Prague

Nizhegorodets	1–3	SSK Future

Vinohrady, Prague

==== Group C ====
Team	GP	W	D	L	GF	GA	PTS
IBK Dalen	3	2	1	0	22	6	5
Tatran Střešovice	3	1	2	0	7	5	4
SC SSK Vítkovice	3	1	1	1	9	8	3
FBT Karhut	3	0	0	3	4	23	0

16 August 2007

Tatran Střešovice	3–1	FBT Karhut

Sparta Arena, Prague

SC SSK Vítkovice	2–5	IBK Dalen

Sparta Arena, Prague

IBK Dalen	3–3	Tatran Střešovice

Sparta Arena, Prague

FBT Karhut	2–6	SC SSK Vítkovice

Vinohrady, Prague

17 August 2007

IBK Dalen	14–1	FBT Karhut

Sparta Arena, Prague

SC SSK Vítkovice	1–1	Tatran Střešovice

Vinohrady, Prague

==== Group D ====
Team	GP	W	D	L	GF	GA	PTS
SV Wiler-Ersigen	3	1	2	0	10	6	4
CelTik/Lekrings	3	2	0	1	5	7	4
Torpedo Pegres Havířov	3	1	1	1	10	7	3
TJ JM Chodov	3	0	1	2	5	10	1

16 August 2007

SV Wiler-Ersigen	2–2	TJ JM Chodov

Sparta Arena, Prague

CelTik/Lekrings	2–1	Torpedo Pegres Havířov

Sparta Arena, Prague

Torpedo Pegres Havířov	3–3	SV Wiler-Ersigen

Sparta Arena, Prague

CelTik/Lekrings	2–1	TJ JM Chodov

Vinohrady, Prague

17 August 2007

SV Wiler-Ersigen	5–1	CelTik/Lekrings

Sparta Arena, Prague

TJ JM Chodov	2–6	Torpedo Pegres Havířov

Vinohrady, Prague

=== Seeding matches ===
==== Group E ====
The top two teams from both group A and B are placed into a group where 3 of the 4 teams will qualify to the quarterfinals. Each team plays 2 games at this stage against their other 2 opponents, as they have already played against one of them. The score and points from the other previous games are then carried over and accounted for in group standings. The top 3 teams advance to the quarterfinals, and the 4th team is eliminated from the tournament.

Team	GP	W	D	L	GF	GA	PTS
SSK Future	3	3	0	0	8	2	6
SSV Helsinki	3	1	1	1	9	7	3
Pixbo Wallenstam IBK	3	1	1	1	10	10	3
FBK Sokol Mladá Boleslav	3	0	0	3	2	10	0

17 August 2007

Pixbo Wallenstam IBK	4–4	SSV Helsinki

Sparta Arena, Prague

SSK Future	1–0	FBK Sokol Mladá Boleslav

Sparta Arena, Prague

Pixbo Wallenstam IBK	2–5	SSK Future

Sparta Arena, Prague

FBK Sokol Mladá Boleslav	1–5	SSV Helsinki

Sparta Arena, Prague

==== Group F ====
The top two teams from both group C and D are placed into a group where 3 of the 4 teams will qualify to the quarterfinals. Each team plays 2 games at this stage against their other 2 opponents, as they have already played against one of them. The score and points from the other previous games are then carried over and accounted for in group standings. The top 3 teams advance to the quarterfinals, and the 4th team is eliminated from the tournament.

Team	GP	W	D	L	GF	GA	PTS
SV Wiler-Ersigen	3	2	1	0	12	7	5
IBK Dalen	3	1	2	0	10	6	4
Tatran Střešovice	3	1	1	1	10	8	3
CelTik/Lekrings	3	0	0	3	2	13	0

17 August 2007

SV Wiler-Ersigen	4–3	Tatran Střešovice

Sparta Arena, Prague

IBK Dalen	4–0	CelTik/Lekrings

Sparta Arena, Prague

Tatran Střešovice	4–1	CelTik/Lekrings

Sparta Arena, Prague

IBK Dalen	3–3	SV Wiler-Ersigen

Sparta Arena, Prague

==== Group G ====
Teams in this group are placed into brackets using the A3-B4 and B3-A4 method. The team that wins the group is then placed into the quarterfinal brackets. 3 of the 4 teams are eliminated from the tournament.

Semifinals
A3	Tapanilan Erä	7
B4	Nizhegorodets	1
B3	FBC Pepino Ostrava	3
A4	Bulldogs Brno	5

Finals
A3	Tapanilan Erä	5
A4	Bulldogs Brno	4

17 August 2007

Tapanilan Erä	7–1	Nizhegorodets

Vinohrady, Prague

FBC Pepino Ostrava	3–5	Bulldogs Brno

Vinohrady, Prague

Tapanilan Erä	5–4	Bulldogs Brno

Vinohrady, Prague

==== Group H ====
Teams in this group are placed into brackets using the C3-D4 and C3-D4 method. The team that wins the group is then placed into the quarterfinal brackets. 3 of the 4 teams are eliminated from the tournament.

Semifinals
C3	SC SSK Vítkovice	0
D4	TJ JM Chodov	2
D3	Torpedo Pegres Havířov	5
C4	FBT Karhut	3

Finals
D4	TJ JM Chodov	2
D3	Torpedo Pegres Havířov	1

17 August 2007

SC SSK Vítkovice	0–2	TJ JM Chodov

Vinohrady, Prague

Torpedo Pegres Havířov	5–3	FBT Karhut

Vinohrady, Prague

TJ JM Chodov	2–1	Torpedo Pegres Havířov

Vinohrady, Prague

=== Playoffs ===
Quarterfinals
E1	SSK Future	2
G1	Tapanilan Erä	3
F2	IBK Dalen	3
E3	Pixbo Wallenstam IBK	0
E2	SSV Helsinki	9
F3	Tatran Střešovice	3
F1	SV Wiler-Ersigen	6
H1	TJ JM Chodov	2

Semifinals
G1	Tapanilan Erä	5
F2	IBK Dalen	8
E2	SSV Helsinki	5
F1	SV Wiler-Ersigen	3

Finals
F2	IBK Dalen	0
E2	SSV Helsinki	3

==== Quarter-finals ====
18 August 2007

SSK Future	2–3	Tapanilan Erä

T-Mobile Arena, Prague

IBK Dalen	3–0	Pixbo Wallenstam IBK

Sparta Arena, Prague

SSV Helsinki	9–3	Tatran Střešovice

Sparta Arena, Prague

SV Wiler-Ersigen	6–2	TJ JM Chodov

T-Mobile Arena, Prague

==== Semi-finals ====
18 August 2007

Tapanilan Erä	5–8	IBK Dalen

T-Mobile Arena, Prague

SSV Helsinki	5–3	SV Wiler-Ersigen

T-Mobile Arena, Prague

==== Championship match ====
19 August 2007

IBK Dalen	0–3	SSV Helsinki

T-Mobile Arena, Prague

== Statistics ==
=== Leading Scorers ===
Player	G	A	PTS	Team
Jani Kukkola	8	4	12	SSV Helsinki
Santtu Manner	8	4	12	SSV Helsinki
Tero Tiitu	5	5	10	SSV Helsinki
Ketil Kronberg	4	6	10	IBK Dalen
Mikael Järvi	3	7	10	SSV Helsinki
Christoph Hofbauer	5	4	9	IBK Dalen
Fredric Westling	5	4	9	IBK Dalen
Michal Jedlička	5	3	8	Tatran Střešovice
Peter Runnestig	4	4	8	Pixbo Wallenstam IBK
Juha Kivilehto	2	6	8	SSV Helsinki

=== Standings ===
Rk.	Team
1st place, gold medalist(s)	SSV Helsinki
2nd place, silver medalist(s)	IBK Dalen
3–4	SV Wiler-Ersigen
3–4	Tapanilan Erä
5–8	SSK Future
5–8	Pixbo Wallenstam IBK
5–8	Tatran Střešovice
5–8	TJ JM Chodov
9–16	FBK Sokol Mladá Boleslav
9–16	CelTik/Lekrings
9–16	Bulldogs Brno
9–16	Nizhegorodets
9–16	FBC Pepino Ostrava
9–16	Torpedo Pegres Havířov
9–16	SC SSK Vítkovice
9–16	FBT Karhut

Preceded by 2006 Czech Open	Fortuna Czech Open; 2007	Succeeded by 2008 Czech Open
