= TJ Znojmo =

Czech floorball club

- Full name: TJ Znojmo LAUFEN CZ
- Founded: 1999
- Arena: MSH Znojmo
- Capacity: 450
- Coach: Men: Zdeněk Rada; Women: Jiří Uher
- League: Men: 1. liga mužů Women: 1. liga žen

TJ Znojmo (TJ Znojmo LAUFEN CZ after its sponsor) is a floorball club based in Znojmo, Czech Republic. The team was founded in 1999.

The men's team plays in the 1. liga mužů, the second highest competition. In four seasons from 2008–09 to 2009–10 and 2017–18 to 2018–19, they played in the Superliga florbalu. In all years in the top competition, the team always fought for retention. They achieved their best result in the 2017–18 season, when they managed to save themselves in the 1st round of the play-down.

former logo

The women's team plays in 1. liga žen (1st women league), the second highest competition. The team played in the Extraliga žen ve florbale (the highest competition) for one 2023–24 season. The team applied to the top league as the only candidate for the vacant places after two Extraliga teams deregistered. The team's greatest sporting success is participation in the quarter-finals of the 1st league in the 2021–22 and 2022–23 seasons.
