= 1978 Rudé Právo Cup =

1978 edition of the ice hockey competition Rudé Právo Cup

The 1978 Rudé Právo Cup was the second edition of the Rudé Právo Cup ice hockey tournament. The Soviet Union won the tournament by defeating Czechoslovakia in all three games played. Matches took place in three cities: Bratislava, Pardubice and Prague.

== Tournament ==
=== Results ===
19 September	Czechoslovakia	2–8	Soviet Union	Zimný štadión, Bratislava

21 September	Soviet Union	5–4	Czechoslovakia	Zimní stadion, Pardubice

22 September	Czechoslovakia	4–5	Soviet Union	Sportovní hala ČSTV, Prague

J. Novák (2), M. Šťastný, Černík / Goals / Petrov (2), Maltsev (2), Fetisov

=== Final standings ===
Place	Team	GP	W	T	L	Goals	Pts
1.	Soviet Union	3	3	0	0	18:10	6
2.	Czechoslovakia	3	0	0	3	10:18	0
