= 1977 Rudé Právo Cup =

International ice hockey competition

The 1977 Rudé Právo Cup was the first edition of the Rudé Právo Cup ice hockey tournament. Three teams participated in the tournament, which was won by the Soviet Union.

== Tournament ==
=== Results ===
September 16	Soviet Union	11–4	(United States) Cincinnati Stingers	Sportovní hala

September 17	Czechoslovakia	8–2	(United States) Cincinnati Stingers	Sportovní hala

September 18	Soviet Union	4-1	Czechoslovakia	Sportovní hala

September 19	Soviet Union	5–2	(United States) Cincinnati Stingers	Sportovní hala

September 20	Czechoslovakia	12–3	(United States) Cincinnati Stingers	Sportovní hala

September 21	Czechoslovakia	5–4	Soviet Union	Sportovní hala

=== Final standings ===
Place	Team	GP	W	T	L	Goals	Pts
1.	Soviet Union	4	3	0	1	24:12	6
2.	Czechoslovakia	4	3	0	1	26:13	6
3.	(United States) Cincinnati Stingers	4	0	0	4	11:36	0
