= 1979 Rudé Právo Cup =

International ice hockey competition

The 1979 Rudé Právo Cup was the third edition of the Rudé Právo Cup ice hockey tournament. Five teams participated in the tournament, which was won by the Soviet Union.

== Tournament ==
=== Results ===
September 8	Soviet Union	5–3	Canada	Sportovní hala

September 8	Czechoslovakia	3–0	Sweden	Sportovní hala

September 9	Soviet Union	4–1	Finland	Sportovní hala

September 9	Sweden	2–0	Canada	Sportovní hala

September 10	Czechoslovakia	6–4	Finland	Sportovní hala

September 11	Sweden	2–8	Soviet Union	Sportovní hala

September 11	Czechoslovakia	9–2	Canada	Sportovní hala

September 12	Sweden	3–4	Finland	Sportovní hala

September 13	Czechoslovakia	4–6	Soviet Union	Sportovní hala

September 13	Canada	3–1	Finland	Sportovní hala

=== Final standings ===
Place	Team	GP	W	T	L	Goals	Pts
1.	Soviet Union	4	4	0	0	23:10	8
2.	Czechoslovakia	4	3	0	1	22:12	6
3.	Sweden	4	1	0	3	7:15	2
4.	Canada	4	1	0	3	8:17	2
5.	Finland	4	1	0	3	10:16	2
