= 1. SC Vítkovice =

Czech floorball team

- Official logo of 1. SC Vítkovice
- Full name: 1. SC NATIOS Vítkovice
- Founded: 1992
- Arena: SC Dubina
- League: Men: Superliga florbalu Women: Extraliga žen
- Championships: Men: Superliga florbalu (7 titles); Women: Extraliga žen (9 titles)

1. SC Vítkovice (currently known as 1. SC NATIOS Vítkovice for sponsorship reasons) is a floorball club based in the Vítkovice district of Ostrava, Czech Republic. The team was founded in 1992, it is thus one of the oldest floorball clubs in the Czech Republic.

The men's team is one of four clubs to have played continuously in the top-tier competition, Superliga florbalu, since its inception in 1993. Until the 2015–16 season, it was the only team capable of breaking the dominance of the previously unrivaled Prague club, Tatran Střešovice, winning championships in the 1995–96, 1996–97, 1999–2000, 2008–09, 2012–13, and 2013–14 seasons. The team also secured the title in the 2018–19 season. In 2010, they became the first Czech club to finish as runners-up in the Champions Cup.

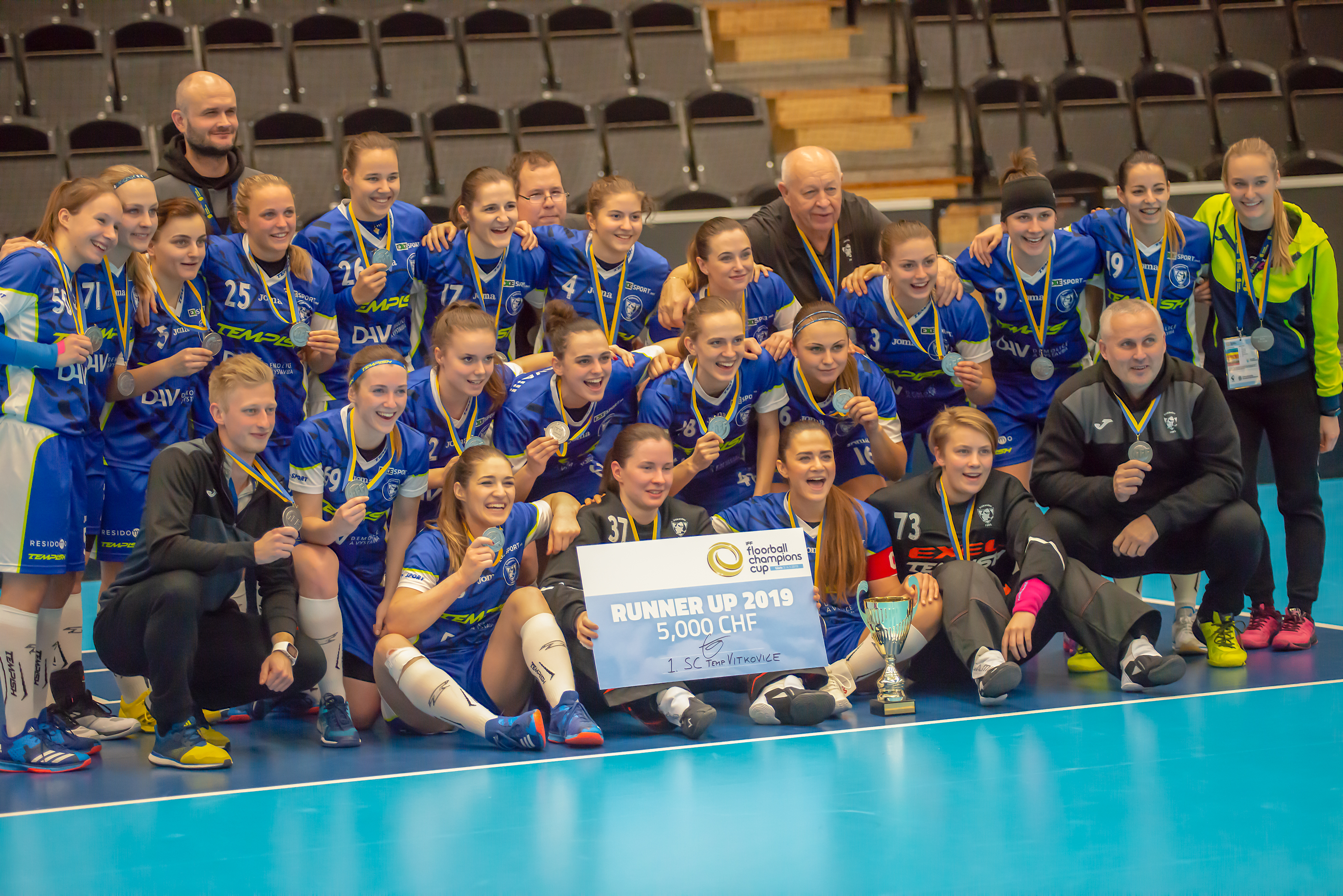
Women's team celebrating their silver at the 2019 Champions Cup

The women's team plays in the Extraliga žen and is the only club to have competed continuously since the league's inception in 1994. The team won the championship in the 1999–00, 2013–14, 2015–16, 2017–18, 2018–19, 2020–21, 2022–23, 2023–24, and 2024–25 seasons. With their ninth title, Vítkovice surpassed Tigers Jižní Město to become the most successful team in the league. In 2014, 2019, and 2026, they finished as runners-up in the Champions Cup, marking the best historical result for a Czech women's team.

Alongside Florbal Chodov and Tatran Střešovice, the club is one of only three to have won championship titles in both the men's and women's top-tier competitions. Furthermore, it is the only club to have secured both titles during the same playoff season, a feat it has achieved on three occasions (1999–00, 2013–14, and 2018–19).

== Men's team ==
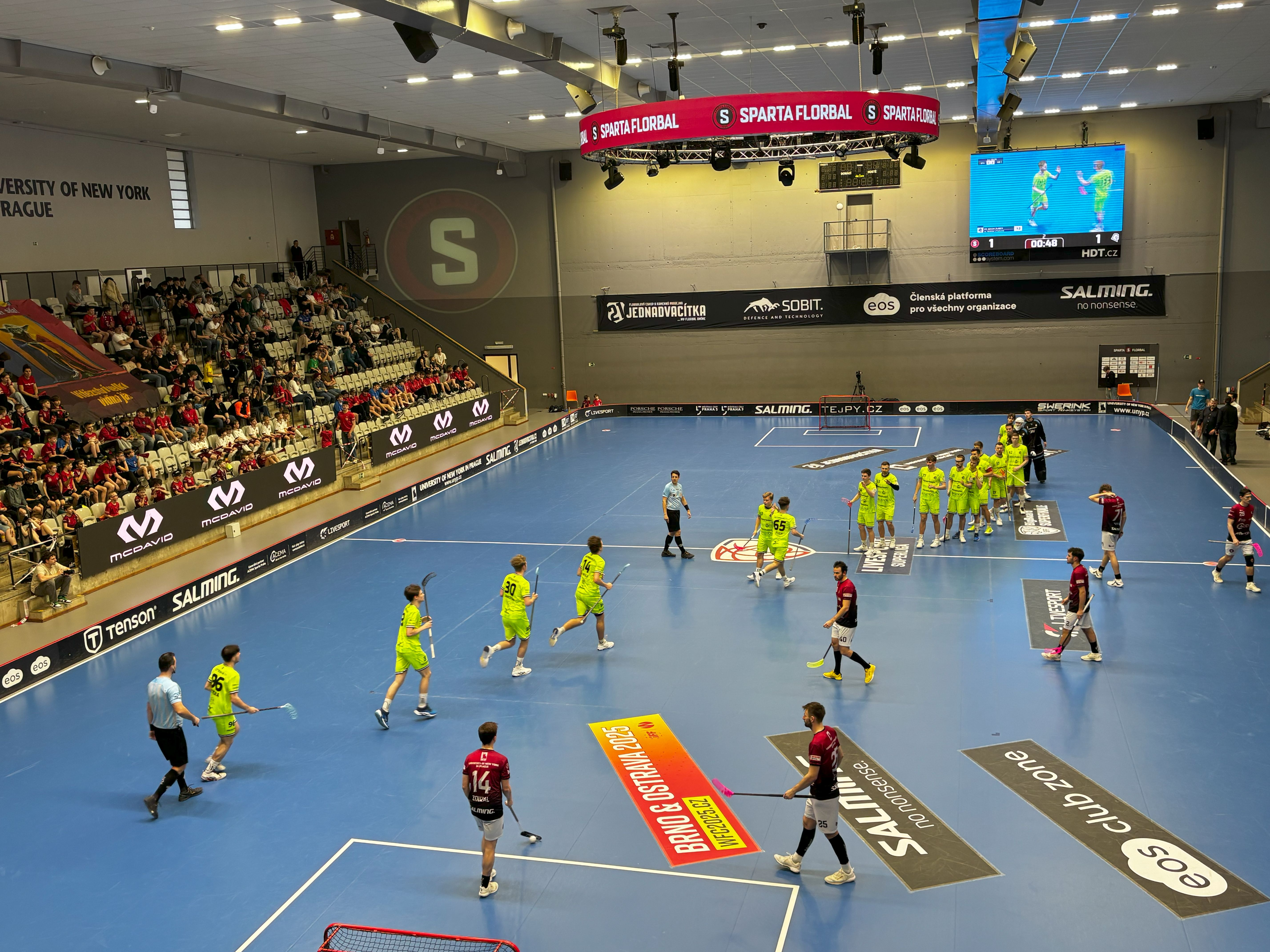
Men's team (in green) celebrating a goal in the 2024–25 season quarterfinal

=== Titles ===
- Superliga florbalu: 1995–96, 1996–97, 1999–00, 2008–09, 2012–13, 2013–14, and 2018–19
- EuroFloorball Cup: 2010 (2nd place)

=== Recent seasons ===
Season	Rank	Note
2021–22	3rd	Semifinal loss to Tatran Střešovice
2022–23	2nd	Runner-up – lost to Tatran Střešovice in final
2023–24	3rd	Semifinal loss to Předvýběr.CZ Florbal MB
2024–25	5th	Quarterfinal loss to ACEMA Sparta Praha
2025–26	5th	Quarterfinal loss to ACEMA Sparta Praha

=== Champions Cup ===
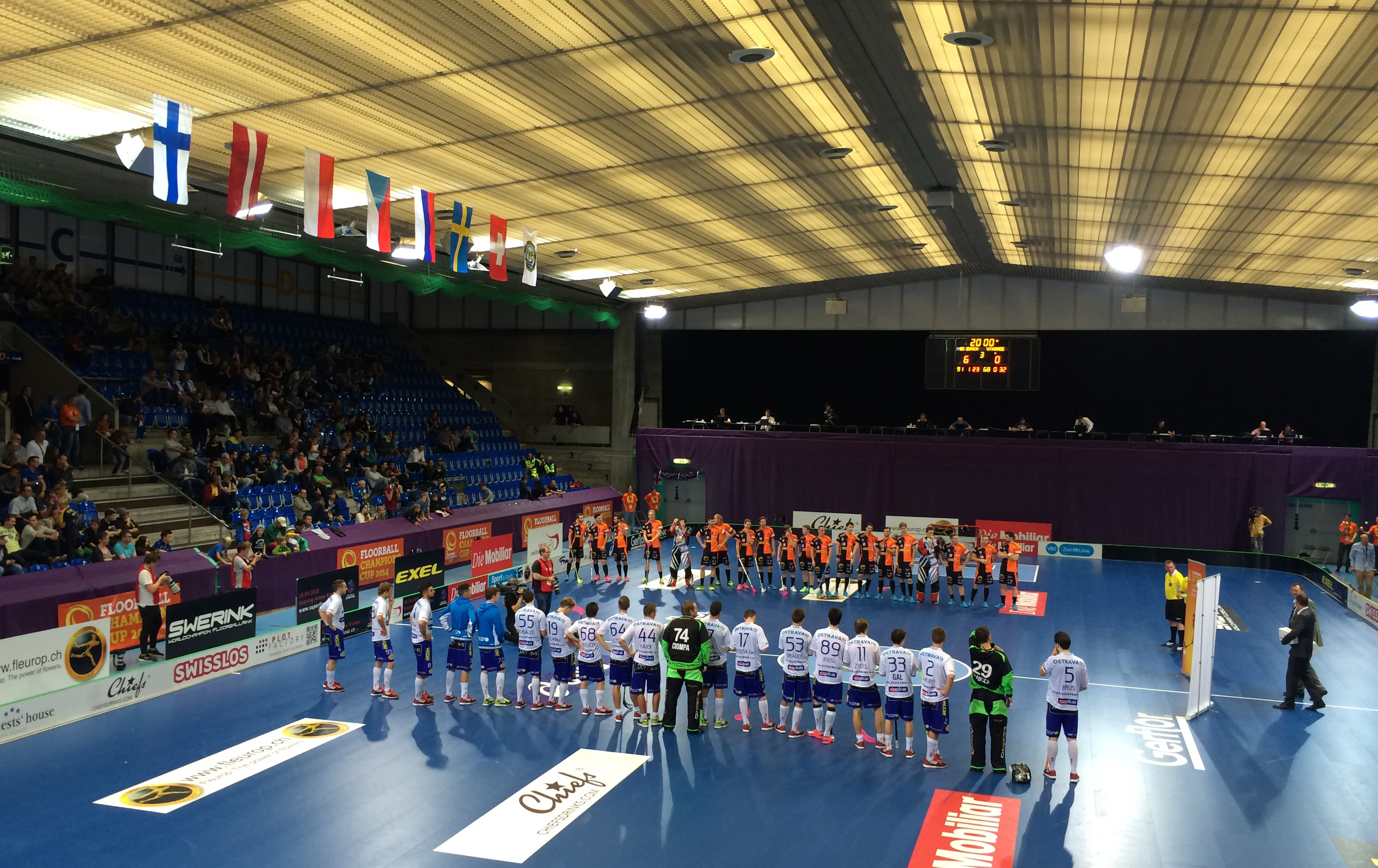
Men's team (in the foreground) at the 2014 Champions Cup

Tournament	Rank	Note
1996 European Cup	6th	Lost 5th place match to (Norway) Greåker IBK
1997 European Cup	5th	Did not advance to playoffs
2009 Euro Floorball Cup	5th	Won 5th place match against (Denmark) Rødovre FC
2010 Euro Floorball Cup	2nd	Runner-up – lost to (Sweden) Storvreta IBK in final
2013 Champions Cup	5th	Did not advance to playoffs
2014 Champions Cup	6th	Did not advance to playoffs
2020 Champions Cup	4th	Lost 3rd place match to (Finland) SC Classic

== Women's team ==
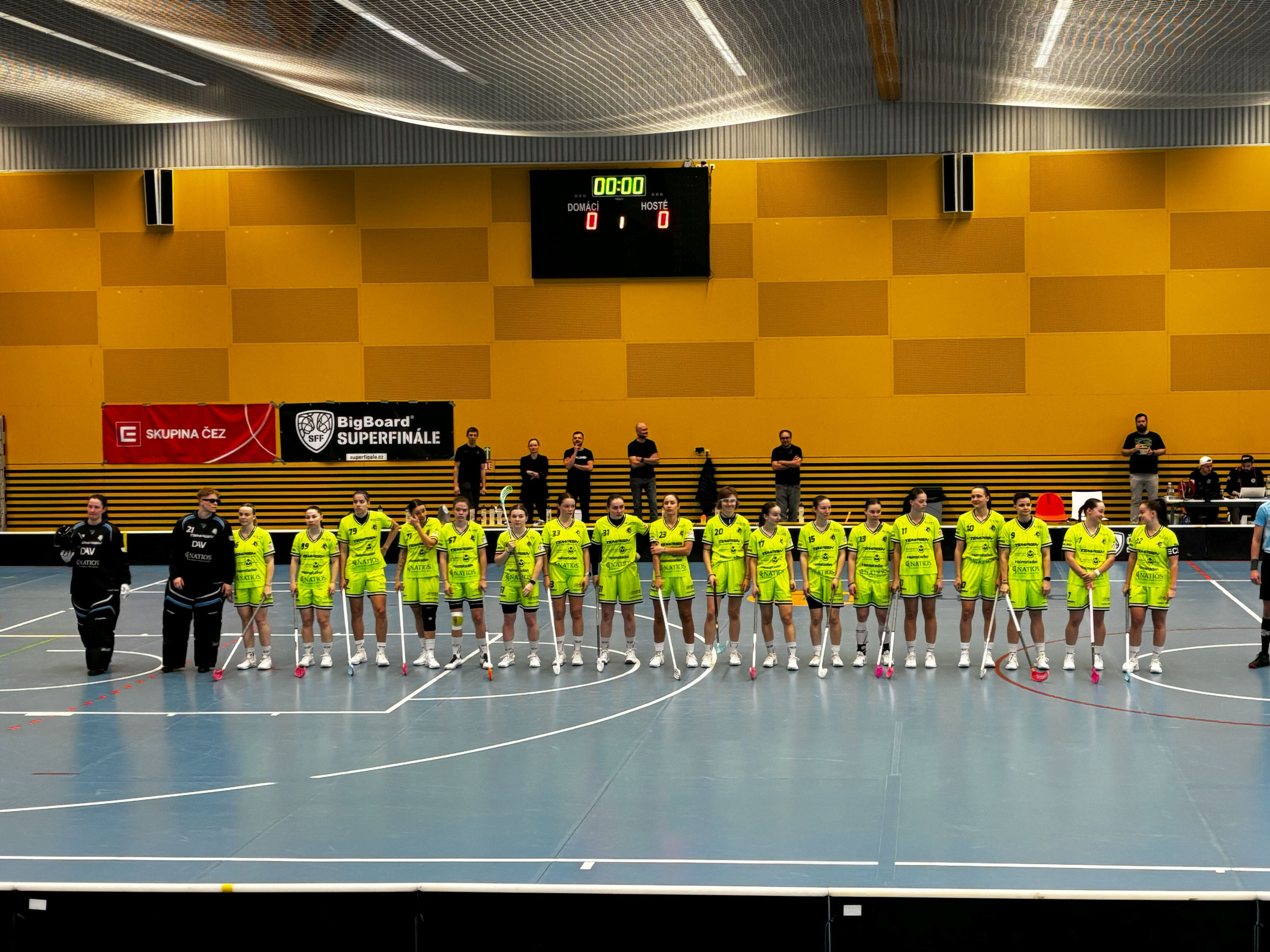
Women's team in the 2024–25 season

=== Titles ===
- Extraliga žen: 1999–00, 2013–14, 2015–16, 2017–18, 2018–19, 2020–21, 2022–23, 2023–24 and 2024–25
- Champions Cup: 2019 (2nd place), 2014 (2nd place), 2026 (2nd place)

=== Recent seasons ===
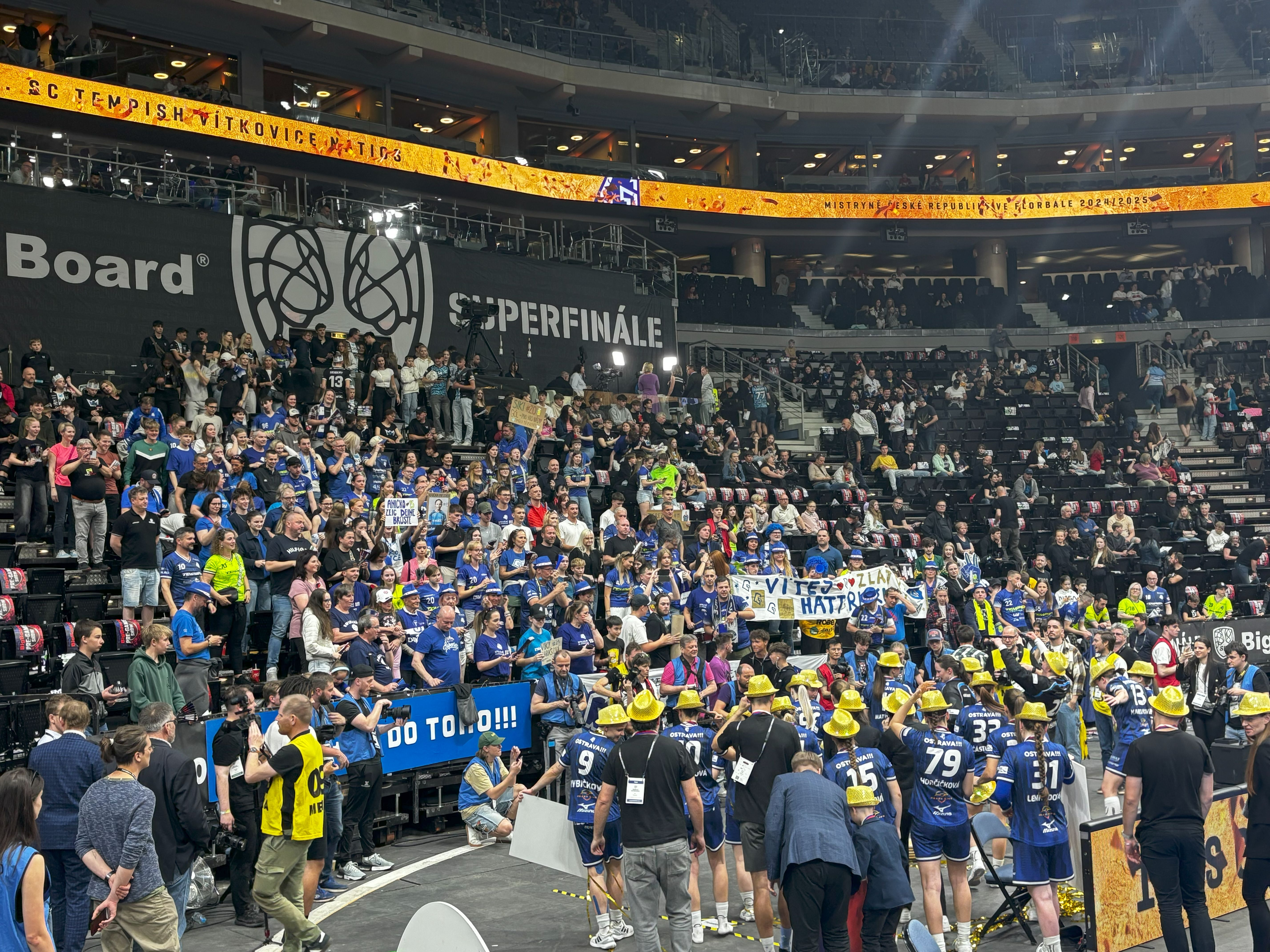
Women's team celebrating the 2024–25 season title in front of their fans

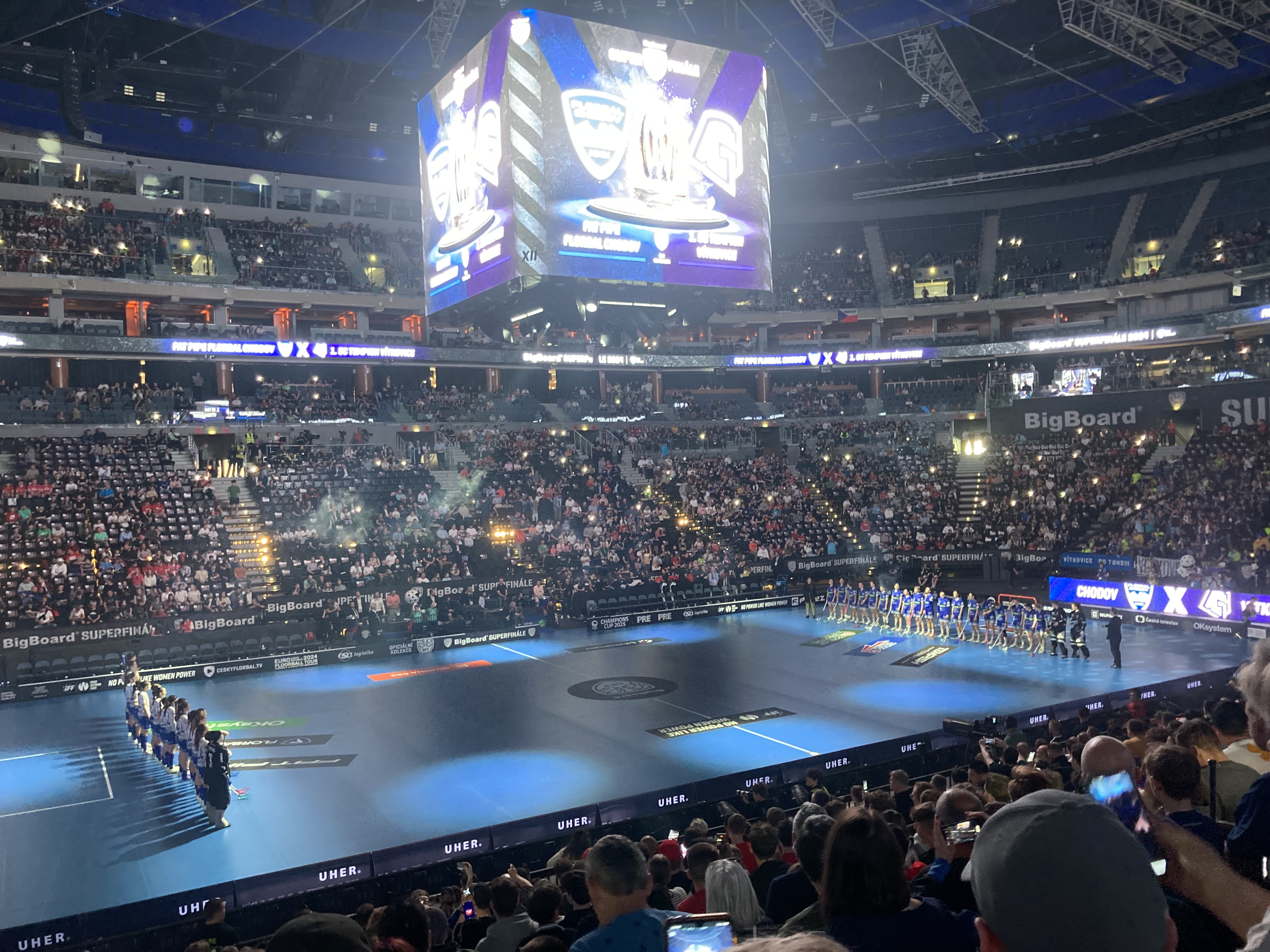
Women's team (on the right) before the 2023–24 final

Season	Rank	Note
2021–22	3rd	Semifinal loss to FBC ČPP Bystroň Group Ostrava
2022–23	1st	Champions – defeated FBC ČPP Bystroň Group Ostrava in final
2023–24	1st	Champions – defeated FAT PIPE Florbal Chodov in final
2024–25	1st	Champions – defeated Tatran Střešovice in final
2025–26	2nd	Runner-up – lost to Bulldogs Brno in final

=== Champions Cup ===
Tournament	Rank	Note
2014 Champions Cup	2nd	Runner-up – lost to (Sweden) Djurgårdens IF IBF in final
2016 Champions Cup	3rd	Semifinal loss to (Sweden) Pixbo Wallenstam
2019 Champions Cup	2nd	Runner-up – lost to (Sweden) IKSU in final
2020 Champions Cup	3rd	Won 3rd place match against (Finland) SB-Pro
2021 Champions Cup	–	Cancelled due to the COVID-19 pandemic
2022 Champions Cup	–	Cancelled due to the COVID-19 pandemic
2024 Champions Cup	–	Quarterfinal loss to (Switzerland) Zug United
2025 Champions Cup	–	Semifinal loss to (Sweden) Thorengruppen IBK
2026 Champions Cup	2nd	Runner-up – lost to (Sweden) Thorengruppen IBK in final
