= 1982–83 Rudé Právo Cup =

International ice hockey competition

The 1982–83 Rudé Právo Cup was the fifth and last edition of the Rudé Právo Cup ice hockey tournament. It was played in stages from September 8, 1982, to September 8, 1983. Four teams participated in the tournament, which was won by the Soviet Union.

== Tournament ==
=== Results ===
| September 8, 1982 | Finland | 3–6 | Sweden | Jyväskylä |

| December 12, 1982 | Sweden | 2–4 | Soviet Union | Gävle |

| December 13, 1982 | Sweden | 3–3 | Soviet Union | Stockholm |

| February 9, 1983 | Finland | 3–3 | Soviet Union | Joensuu |

| February 10, 1983 | Finland | 3–7 | Soviet Union | Kouvola |

| April 4, 1983 | Czechoslovakia | 11–2 | Sweden | Olomouc |

| April 5, 1983 | Czechoslovakia | 6–2 | Sweden | Brno |

| April 8, 1983 | Sweden | 3–1 | Finland | Stockholm |

| April 10, 1983 | Czechoslovakia | 9–6 | Finland | Plzeň |

| April 11, 1983 | Czechoslovakia | 9–2 | Finland | Teplice |

| September 6, 1983 | Czechoslovakia | 3–5 | Soviet Union | Pardubice |

| September 8, 1983 | Czechoslovakia | 3–4 | Soviet Union | Ostrava |

=== Final standings ===
| Place | Team | GP | W | T | L | Goals | Pts |
|---|---|---|---|---|---|---|---|
| 1. | Soviet Union | 6 | 4 | 2 | 0 | 26:17 | 10 |
| 2. | Czechoslovakia | 6 | 4 | 0 | 2 | 41:21 | 8 |
| 3. | Sweden | 6 | 2 | 1 | 3 | 18:28 | 5 |
| 4. | Finland | 6 | 0 | 1 | 5 | 18:37 | 1 |
