= Rudé Právo Cup =

Czechoslovak ice hockey tournament

The Rudé Právo Cup was an ice hockey tournament that existed from 1977 to 1983. The tournament was sponsored by Rudé právo, the official newspaper of the Communist Party of Czechoslovakia.

The Soviet Union won all five tournaments held, while Czechoslovakia in turn finished second in all of them.

== Results ==
| Year | 1st place | 2nd place | 3rd place | Host |
|---|---|---|---|---|
| 1977 | Soviet Union | Czechoslovakia | (United States) Cincinnati Stingers | (Czechoslovakia) Prague |
| 1978 | Soviet Union | Czechoslovakia | Only two teams | Czechoslovakia |
| 1979 | Soviet Union | Czechoslovakia | Sweden | (Czechoslovakia) Prague |
| 1981-82 | Soviet Union | Czechoslovakia | Sweden | Czechoslovakia, Sweden, Finland |
| 1982-83 | Soviet Union | Czechoslovakia | Sweden | Czechoslovakia, Sweden, Finland |
