= 1981–82 Rudé Právo Cup =

International ice hockey competition

The 1981–82 Rudé Právo Cup was the fourth edition of the Rudé Právo Cup ice hockey tournament. It was played in stages from August 12, 1981, to April 4, 1982. Four teams participated in the tournament, which was won by the Soviet Union.

== Tournament ==
=== Results ===
August 12, 1981	Sweden	1–2	Soviet Union	Stockholm

August 14, 1981	Sweden	1–4	Soviet Union	Gothenburg

August 17, 1981	Finland	3–4	Soviet Union	Tampere

August 18, 1981	Finland	2–5	Soviet Union	Helsinki

October 28, 1981	Czechoslovakia	7–1	Finland	Teplice

October 29, 1981	Czechoslovakia	5–2	Finland	Prague

December 13, 1981	Finland	3–3	Sweden	Oulu

February 3, 1982	Sweden	7–1	Finland	Västerås

February 13, 1982	Czechoslovakia	3–6	Soviet Union	Prague

February 14, 1982	Czechoslovakia	3–5	Soviet Union	Prague

April 2, 1982	Czechoslovakia	4–4	Sweden	Prague

April 4, 1982	Czechoslovakia	4–1	Sweden	Hradec Králové

=== Final standings ===
Place	Team	GP	W	T	L	Goals	Pts
1.	Soviet Union	6	6	0	0	26:13	12
2.	Czechoslovakia	6	3	1	2	26:19	7
3.	Sweden	6	1	2	3	17:18	4
4.	Finland	6	0	1	5	12:31	1
