= FBC Ostrava =

Czech floorball club

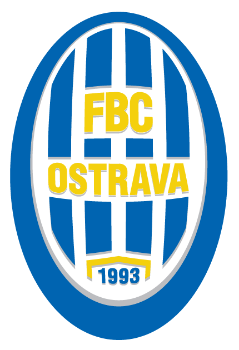
- Official logo of FBC Ostrava
- Full name: FBC ČPP Bystroň Group Ostrava
- Founded: 1993
- Arena: ČPP Aréna
- League: Men: Superliga florbalu Women: Extraliga žen
- Championships: Women: Extraliga žen (2021–22)

FBC Ostrava (FBC ČPP Bystroň Group Ostrava after its sponsors) is a floorball club based in Ostrava, Czech Republic. The team was founded in 1993.

The men's team has played in the highest Czech floorball league, Superliga florbalu, since its foundation in 1993. The team ended in second place nine times, in the seasons 1993–94 through 1995–96, 1998–99, 2002–03 through 2005–06, and the last time in the season 2010–11. That makes it the fifth most successful Czech men team and the third team in number of participations in finals.

Women's team has also played in the highest Czech floorball league, Extraliga žen, since 2013–14. Previously it played the highest league in the seasons 2007–08 through 2011–12. The team won a title in the season 2021–22, the fifth Czech women's team to achieve that. At the subsequent Champions Cup, the team won bronze. They ended in second place in the league in the season 2022–23.

== Men's team ==
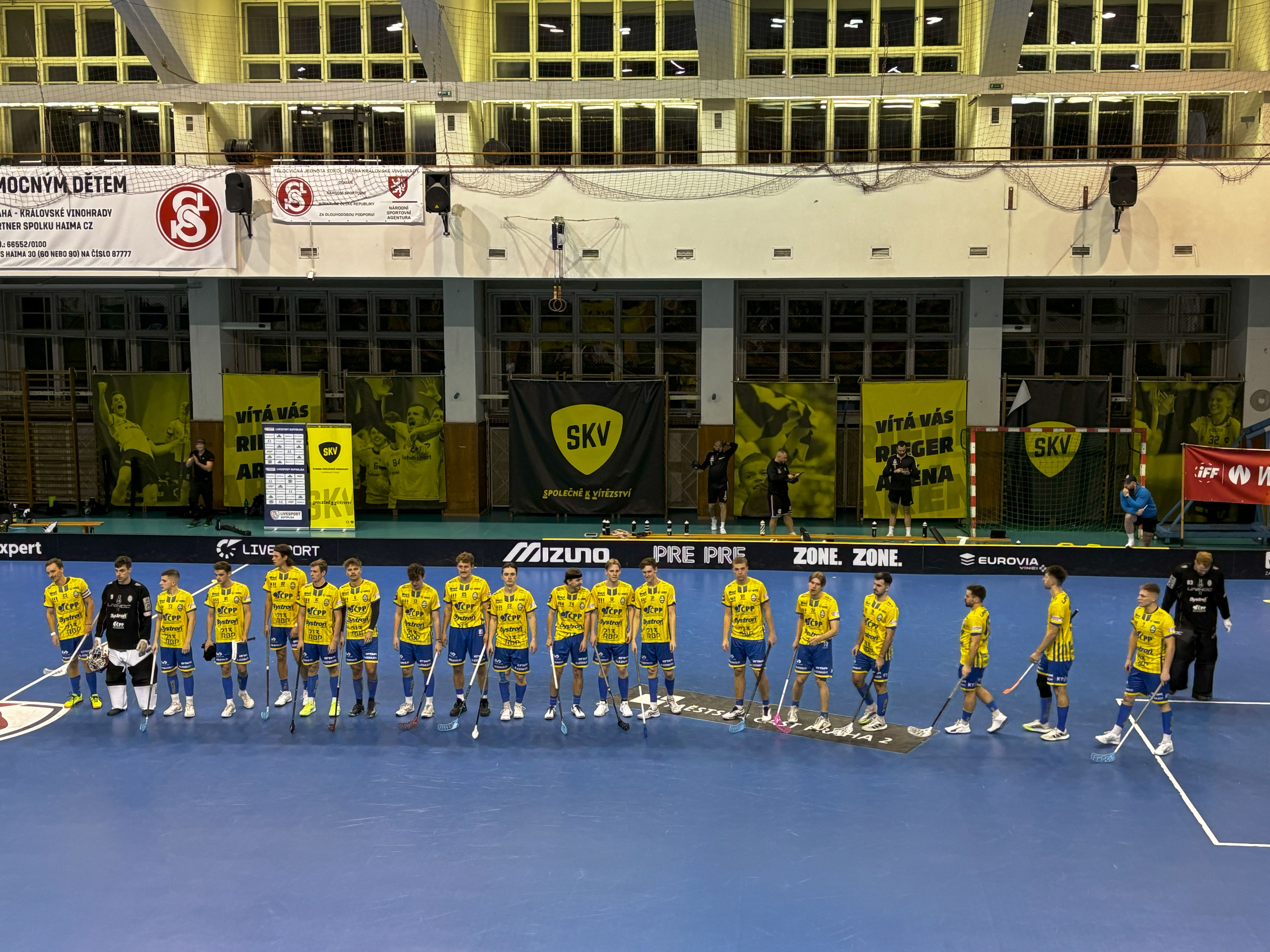
Men's team in the 2024–25 season

=== Recent seasons ===
Season	Rank	Note
2021–22	9th	Eighthfinal loss to FBC Liberec
2022–23	9th	Eighthfinal loss to TJ Sokol Královské Vinohrady
2023–24	9th	Eighthfinal loss to FBC 4CLEAN Česká Lípa
2024–25	12th	Won 1st round relegation play-offs against Florbal Vary
2025–26	9th	Eighthfinal loss to BA SOKOLI Pardubice

== Women's team ==
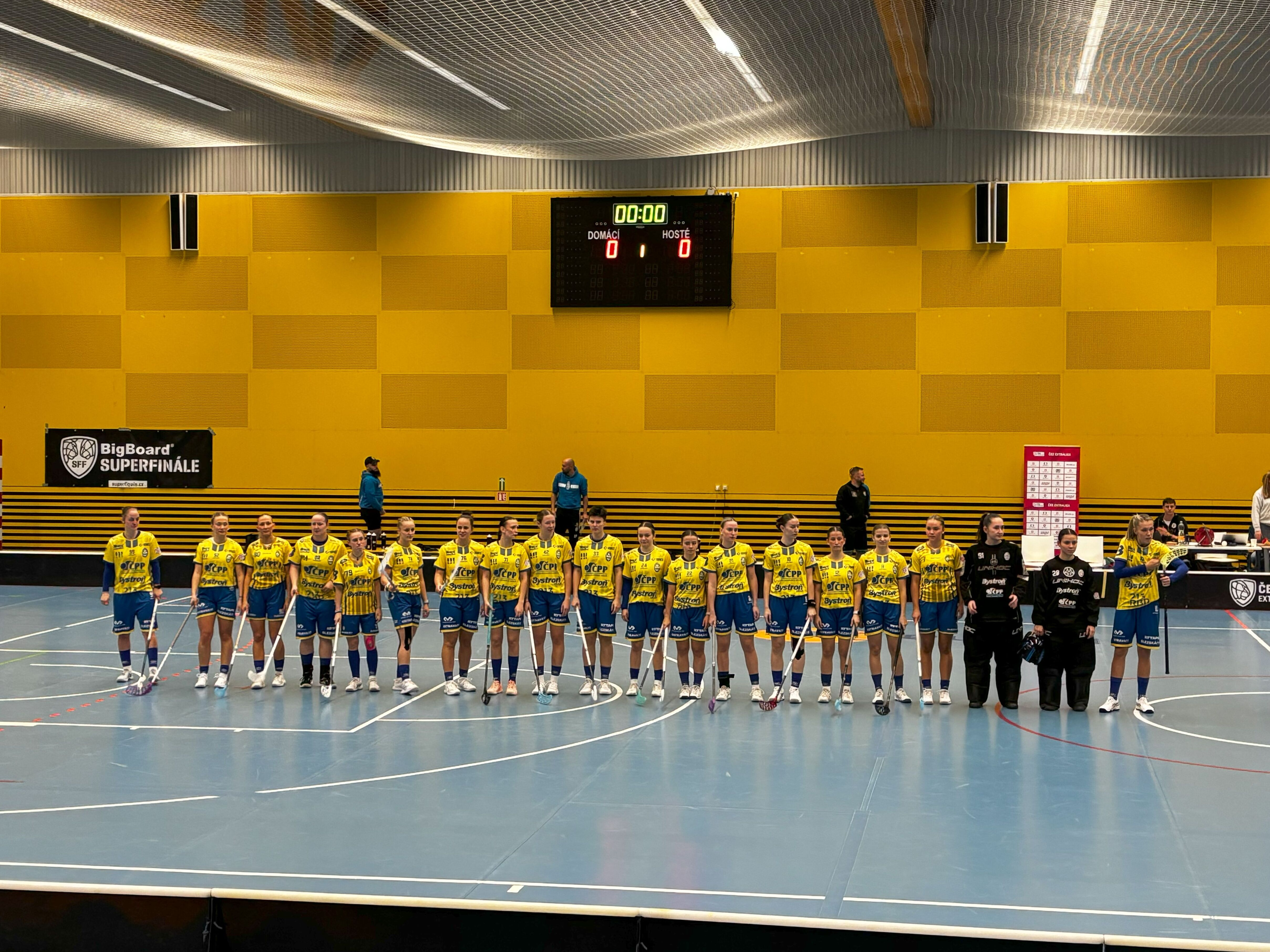
Women's team in the 2024–25 season

=== Titles ===
- Extraliga žen: 2021–22

=== Recent seasons ===
Season	Rank	Note
2021–22	1st	Champions – defeated FAT PIPE Florbal Chodov in final
2022–23	2nd	Runner-up – lost to 1. SC TEMPISH Vítkovice in final
2023–24	3rd	Semifinal loss to 1. SC TEMPISH Vítkovice
2024–25	3rd	Semifinal loss to 1. SC TEMPISH Vítkovice
2025–26	5th	Quarterfinal loss to Bulldogs Brno

=== Champions Cup ===
Tournament	Rank	Note
2023 Champions Cup	3rd	Won 3rd place match against (Switzerland) Kloten-Dietlikon Jets
2024 Champions Cup	–	Quarterfinal loss to (Switzerland) Kloten-Dietlikon Jets

== Gallery ==
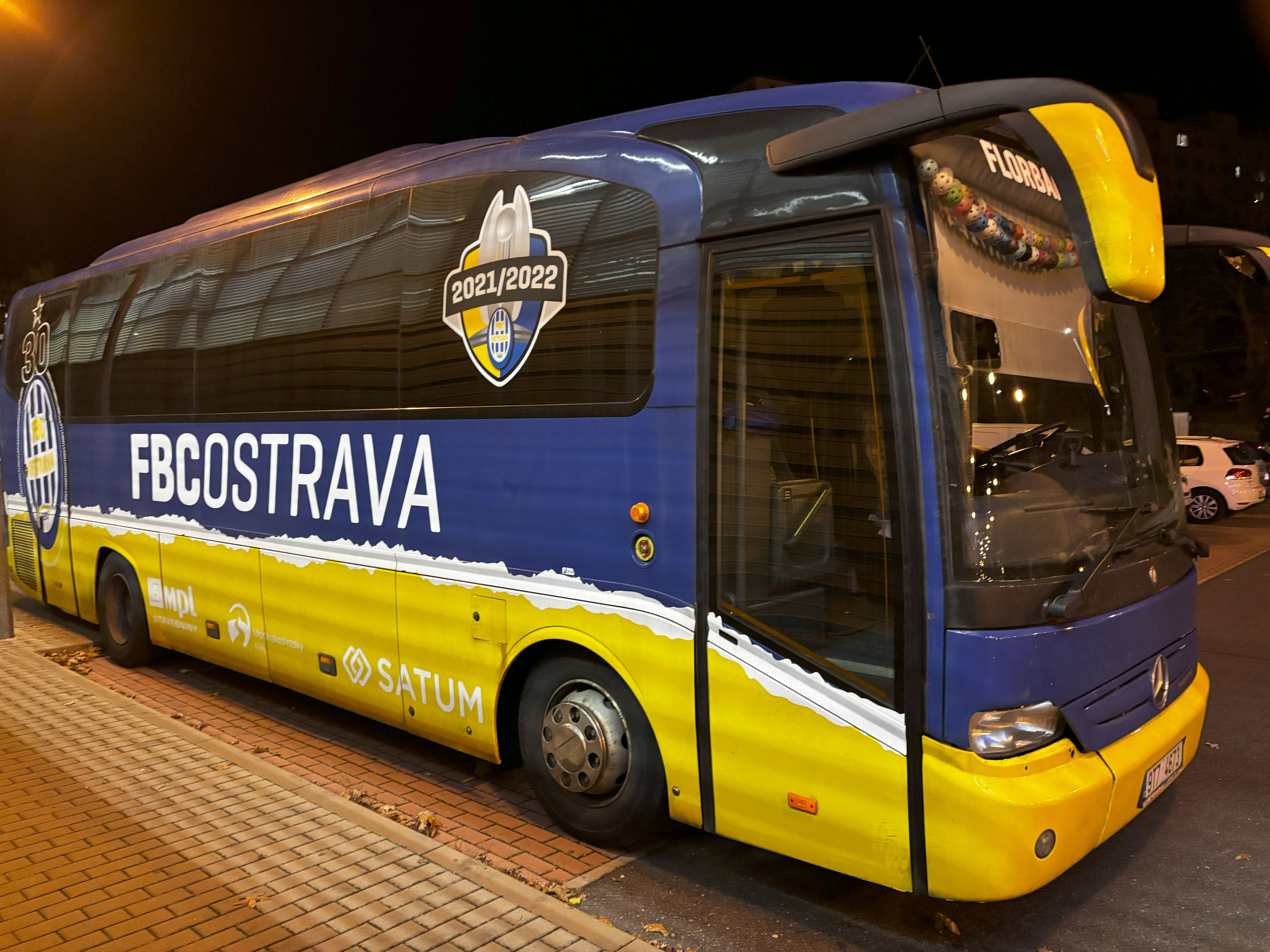
Club bus

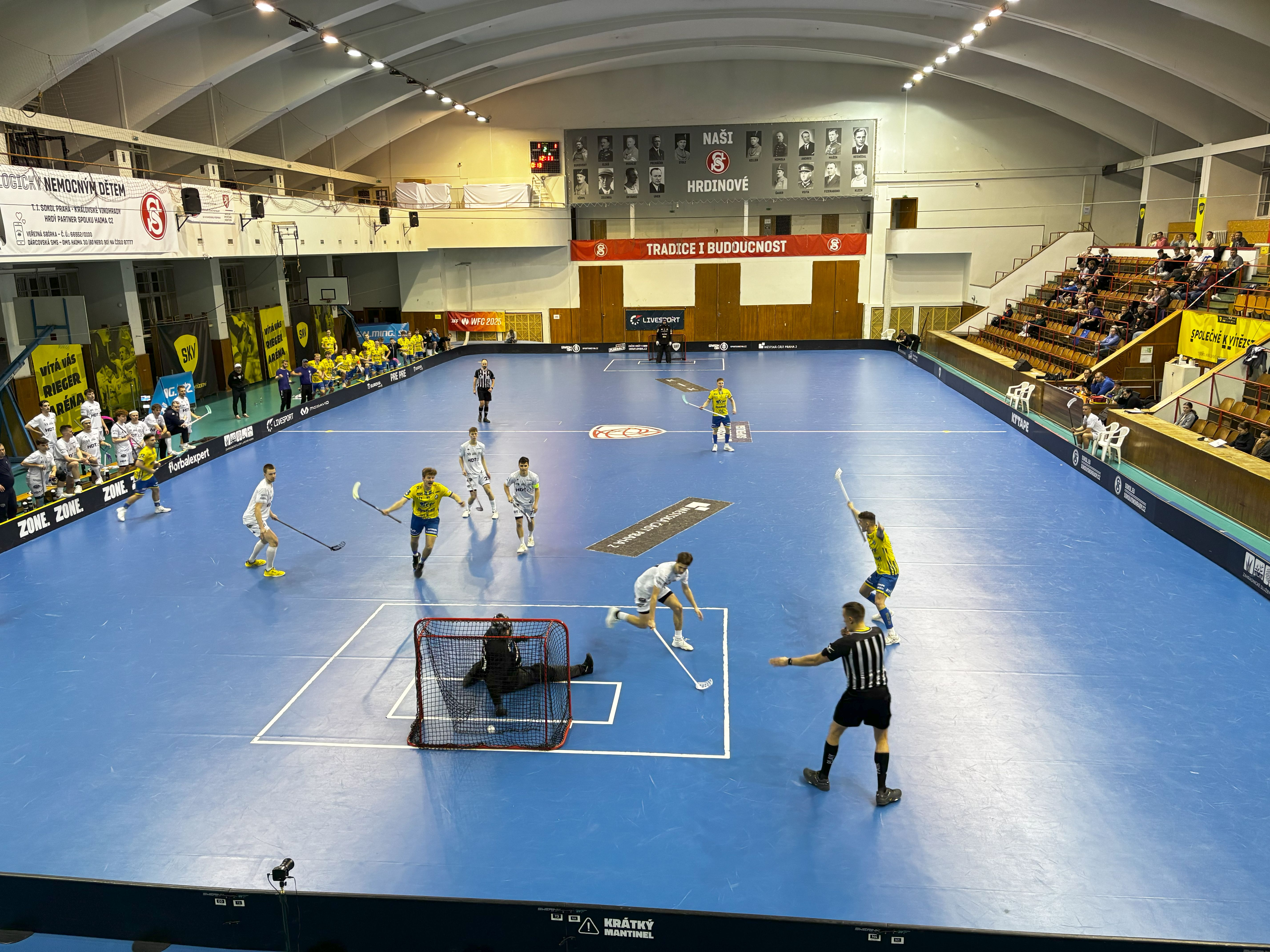
The men's team (in yellow-blue) in the 2024–25 season

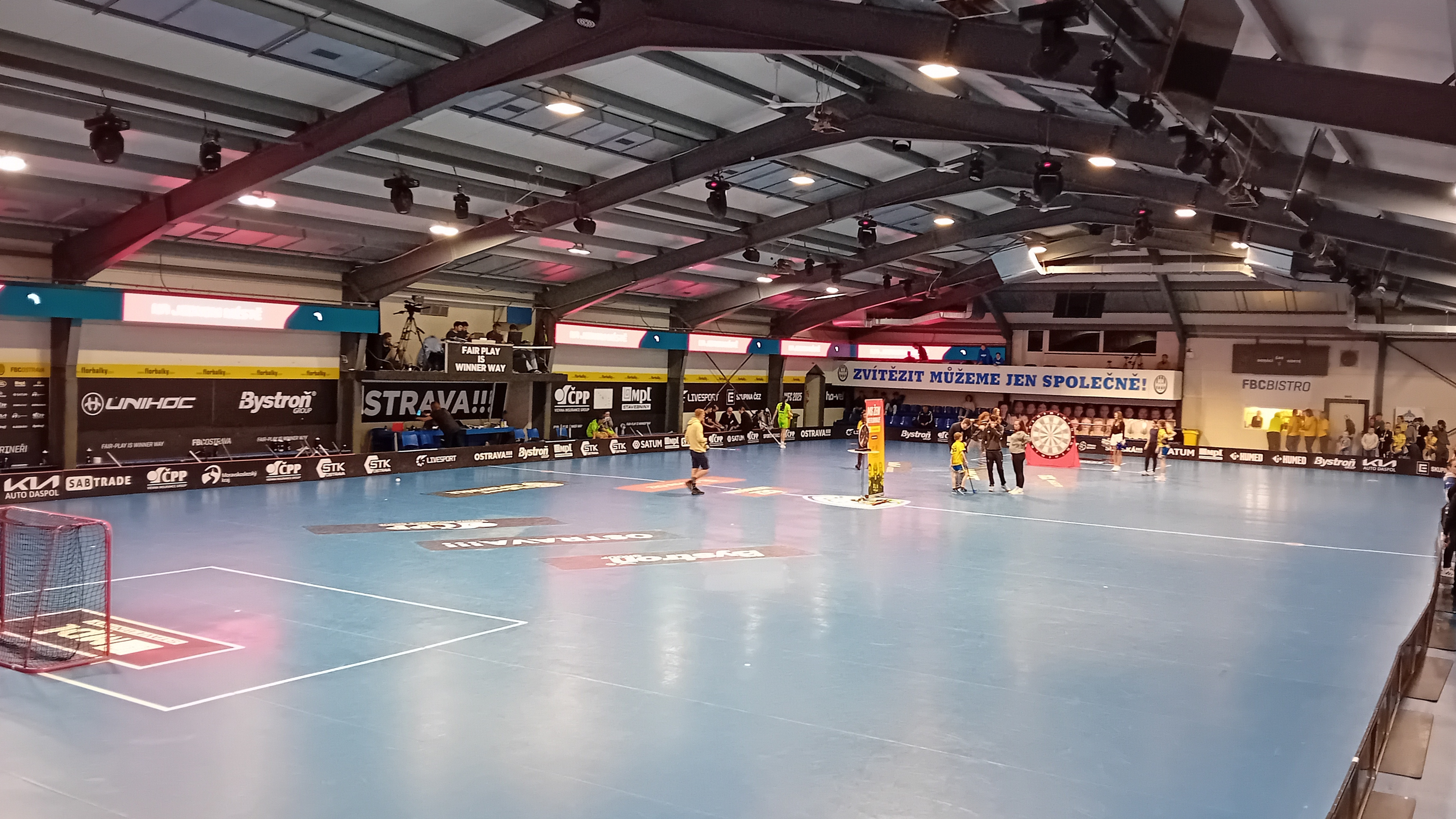
Interior of the ČPP Aréna
