= FBS Olomouc =

Czech floorball team

- Full name: FBS Olomouc z. s.
- Founded: 2001
- Arena: SH Čajkaréna
- Capacity: 220
- Coach: Radek Řehák; Dagmar Sigmundová
- League: Women: Extraliga žen ve florbale

FBS Olomouc is a floorball team based in Olomouc, Czech Republic. The team was founded in 2001.

The women's team has been playing in the Extraliga žen ve florbale since the 2006–07 season. The team's biggest success is advancing to the semi-finals and the final fourth place in the 2007–08 season. In addition, the team advanced to the playoffs in the 2012–13, 2014–15, 2020–21, 2021–22 and 2022–23 seasons.

The coaches of the women's A team are Radek Řehák and Dagmar Sigmundová.

The men's team plays Division, the fourth highest competition.
