= Livesport =

Czech sports media company

Livesport Ltd.
- Industry: Instant sports data and sports news
- Founded: 2006; 19 years ago
- Headquarters: Prague, Czech Republic
- Area served: Worldwide
- Revenue: €114 million (2021)
- Owners: Martin Hájek; Jiří Mareš
- Number of employees: 1000+ (January 2023)
- Website: livesport.eu

Livesport Ltd. is a Czech media and technology company headquartered in Prague and founded in 2006 by Martin Hájek and Jiří Mareš. Livesport provides websites and mobile apps with live scores, sports news, statistics, and other information from over 35 major sports. Livesport's flagship product, the Flashscore network, is visited by approximately 100 million monthly users.

== The history and the present ==
In April 2006, the company launched Livesport.cz, its first local project providing instant live scores. Livesport then began to expand its service to other countries and also launched a global service, Flashscore.com, which gave its name to the entire Flashscore network. As of 2021, Livesport operates in 46 countries.

In October 2013, Livesport released the first version of its Flashscore mobile app for iOS and, in 2014, also for Android. As of 2021, mobile apps developed by Livesport have been globally downloaded by more than 100 million users.

In January 2023, Pavel Krbec became the CEO of the company.

== Investments ==
In January 2015, Livesport acquired a share in the Danish B2B sports data provider Enetpulse. After a few months, Livesport became the sole owner. The company is also a sole owner of the international broadcasting rights trader Pragosport and holds shares in the Y Soft Ventures investment fund, and in the technological platform Liftago.

== Partnerships and corporate social responsibility ==
Livesport is a general partner of EDUin, a non-profitable organisation focused on education. Furthermore, the company supports several charitable projects like the Czech affiliate of SOS Children's Villages. In 2020, Livesport became a general partner of the men's top floorball league in the Czech Republic and the partner of both men's and women's national floorball teams.

In 2021, Livesport became the general partner of the WTA tennis tournament currently branded as Livesport Prague Open.
