= Florbal Chodov =

Floorball club in Prague, Czech Republic

- Official logo of Florbal Chodov
- Full name: FAT PIPE Florbal Chodov
- Founded: 1991
- Arena: Jedenáctka VS; SH Jižní Město
- Coach: Men: David Podhráský; Women: Lukáš Netrefa
- League: Men: Superliga florbalu Women: Extraliga žen
- Championships: Men: Superliga florbalu (2015–16 and 2016–17); Women: Extraliga žen (2014–15)

Florbal Chodov (FAT PIPE Florbal Chodov after its sponsor) is a floorball club based in Chodov, Prague, Czech Republic. The team was founded in 1991.

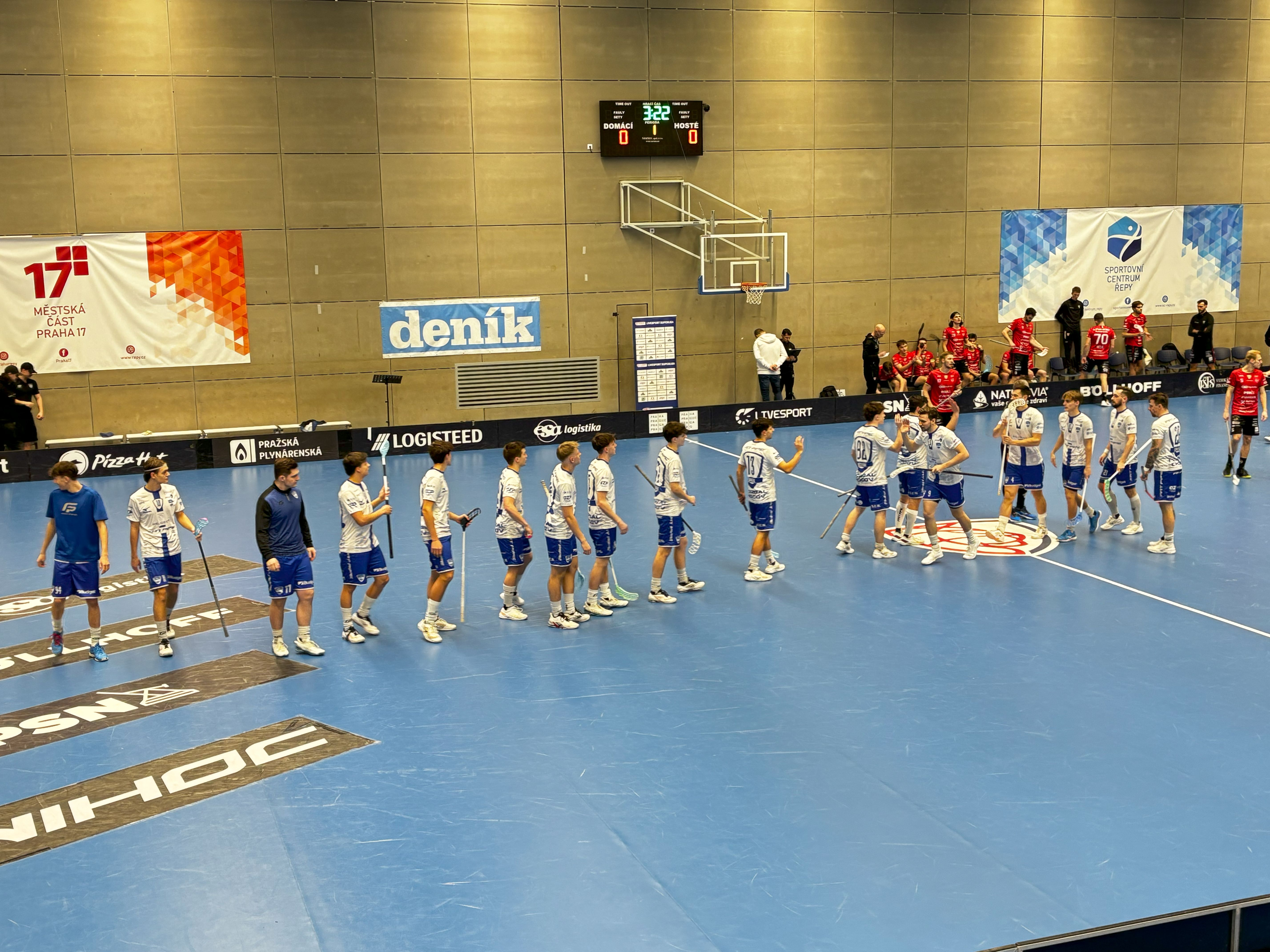
Men's team in the semifinals of the Czech Floorball Cup in 2025

The men's team has played in the highest Czech floorball league, Superliga florbalu, since its foundation in 1993. With two titles in the 2015–16 and 2016–17 seasons, it is the fourth most successful team of the league, after Tatran Střešovice, 1. SC Vítkovice and Florbal MB.

The women's team has also played in the highest Czech floorball league, Extraliga žen, since the 2005–06 season. The team won the league in the 2014–15 season.

== Men's team ==
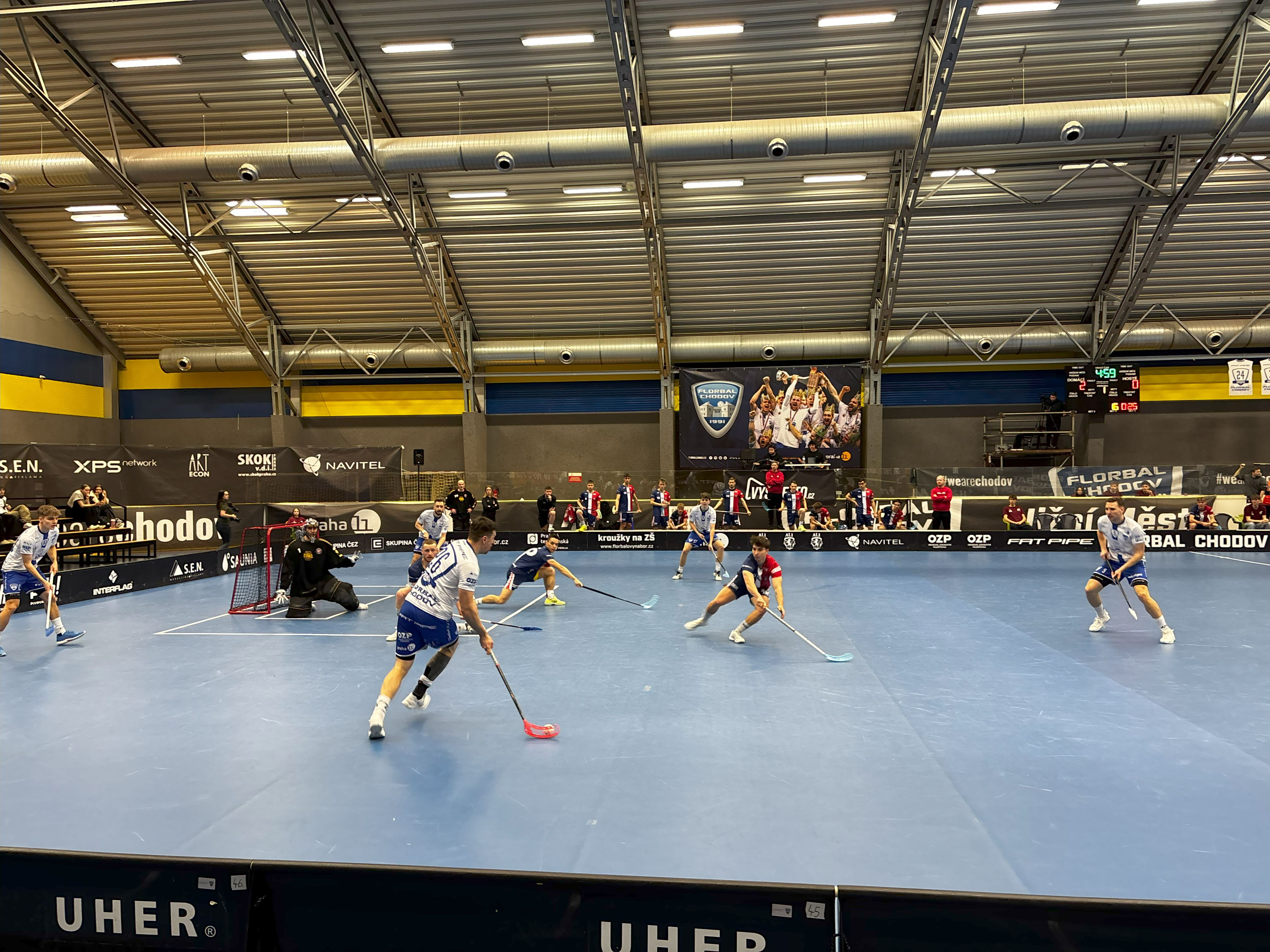
Men's team (in white) in a home game in 2024–25 play-offs

=== Titles ===
- Superliga florbalu: 2015–16 and 2016–17

=== Recent seasons ===
Season	Rank	Note
2020–21	3rd	Semifinal loss to Florbal MB
2021–22	6th	Quarterfinal loss to 1. SC Vítkovice
2022–23	5th	Quarterfinal loss to FbŠ Bohemians
2023–24	4th	Semifinal loss to Tatran Střešovice
2024–25	7th	Quarterfinal loss to Tatran Střešovice
2025–26	6th	Quarterfinal loss to HDT.cz Florbal Vary Bohemians

== Women's team ==
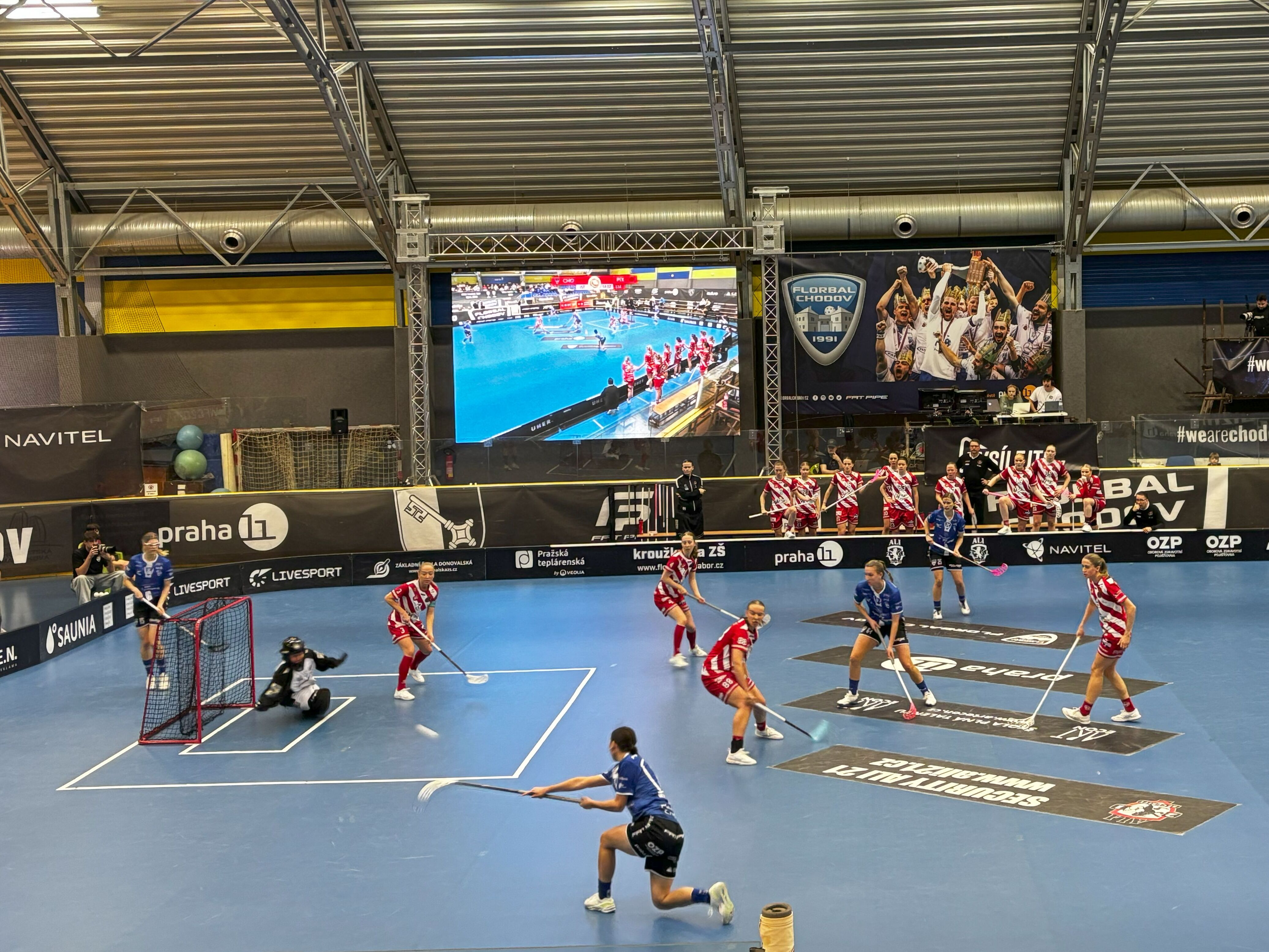
Women's team (in blue) in the home semifinal of the 2025 Champions Cup against Pixbo IBK

=== Titles ===
- Extraliga žen ve florbale: 2014–15

=== Recent seasons ===
Season	Rank	Note
2020–21	2nd	Runner-up – lost to 1. SC Vítkovice in final
2021–22	2nd	Runner-up – lost to FBC Ostrava in final
2022–23	3rd	Semifinal loss to FBC Ostrava
2023–24	2nd	Runner-up – lost to 1. SC Vítkovice in final
2024–25	4th	Semifinal loss to Tatran Střešovice
2025–26	3rd	Semifinal loss to 1. SC Vítkovice
