= Extraliga žen ve florbale =

Premier women's floorball league in the Czech Republic

ČEZ Extraliga
- Sport: Floorball
- Founded: 1994; 32 years ago
- Administrator: Český florbal
- No. of teams: 12
- Country: Czech Republic
- Continent: Europe
- Most recent champion: Bulldogs Brno (2025–26, 1st title)
- Most titles: 1. SC Vítkovice (9 titles)
- Broadcasters: ČT Sport, Sporty TV
- Streaming partner: Český florbal TV
- Level on pyramid: Level 1
- Relegation to: 1. liga žen
- Domestic cup: Pohár Českého florbalu
- International cup: Champions Cup

Extraliga žen ve florbale (also ČEZ Extraliga) is the highest-level women's league in the Czech Republic.

The league consists of 12 teams. Since the competition's foundation in 1994, a total of 48 teams have participated, of which only 1. SC Vítkovice has played in the league continuously since its inception.

Seven teams have won the championship title in the history of the competition. The most successful teams are 1. SC Vítkovice (nine titles, most recently in the 2024–25 season), Tigers Jižní Město (eight titles, most recently in the 2016–17 season), FBC Liberec (six titles, most recently in the 2005–06 season), and Tatran Střešovice (five titles, most recently in the 1998–99 season). In the last 2025–26 season, the team Bulldogs Brno won the championship for the first time.

The champion of the league is eligible to compete at the Champions Cup.

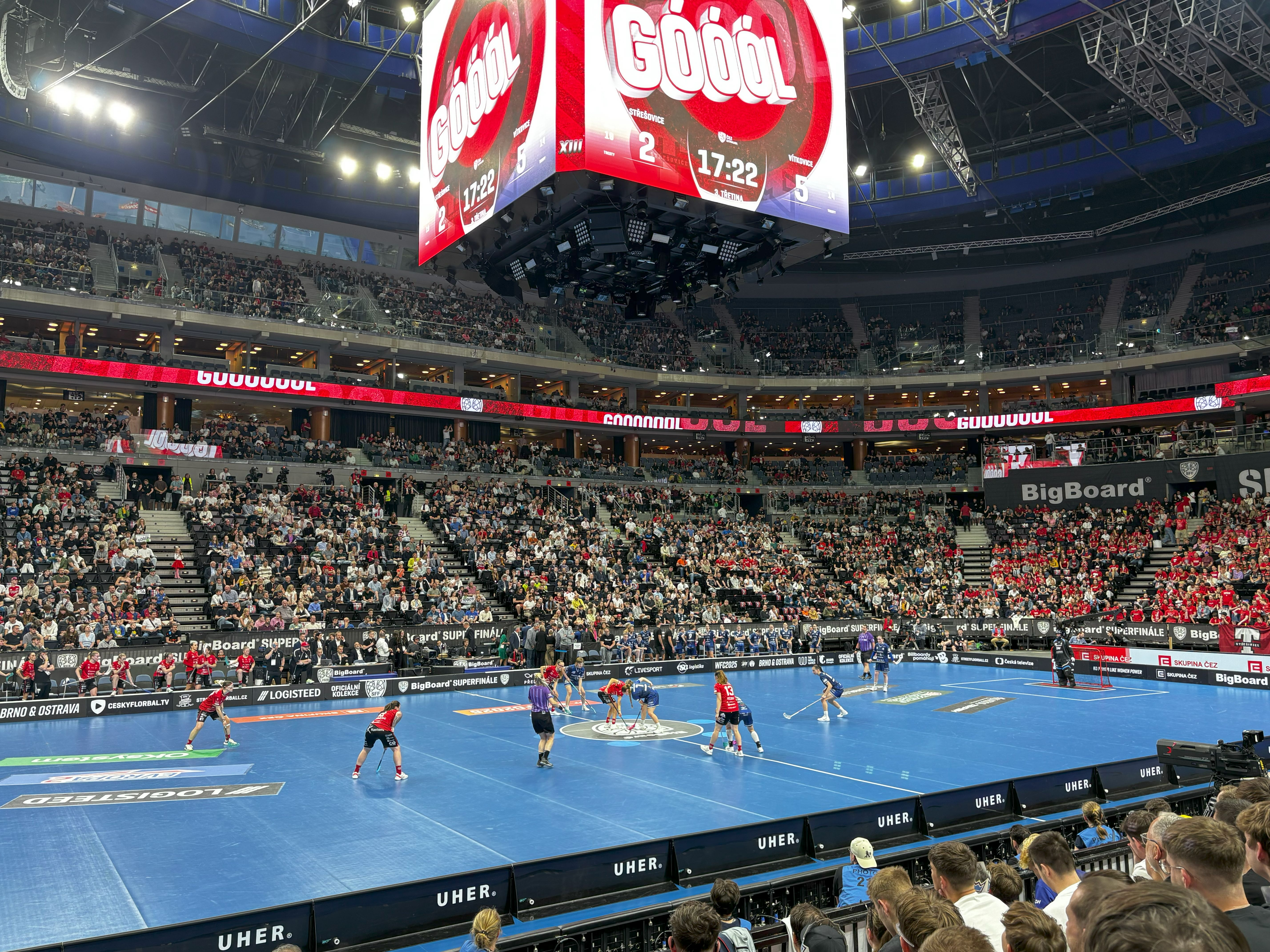
Superfinal match – Tatran Střešovice vs. 1. SC Vítkovice in the 2024–25 season

== Naming ==
The name of the league.

- 1994 – 2006: 1. liga
- 2006 – 2023: Extraliga žen ve florbale
- 2023 – current: ČEZ Extraliga

== Season structure ==
In the regular season, which takes place approximately from September to March, all teams play each other twice (a total of 22 rounds). Teams receive 3 points for a win, 2 points for an overtime win, and 1 point for an overtime loss. The winner of the regular season is awarded the Presidential Cup.

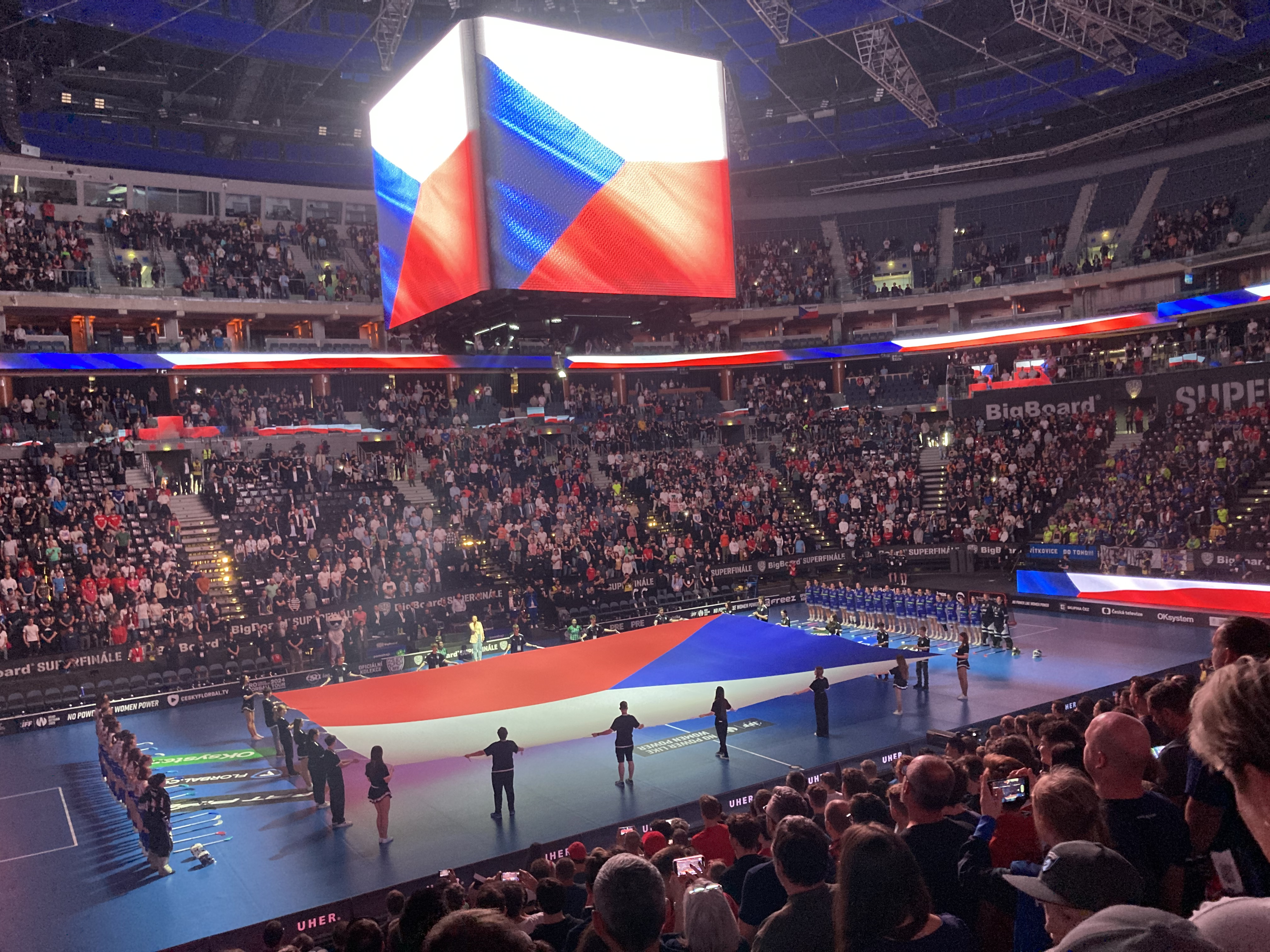
Opening ceremony of the Superfinal in the 2023–24 season

After the regular season, the top eight teams advance to the playoffs, which usually begin in March and culminate in April. The top three teams from the regular season successively choose their quarterfinal opponents from the four remaining teams, taking into account factors such as geographical proximity, current form, and other aspects. Similarly, in the semifinals, the highest-ranked remaining team from the regular season selects its opponent from the two lowest-ranked advancing teams. Both the quarterfinals and semifinals are played as best-of-seven series. The final is a single match, held together with the men's Superliga florbalu as part of an event called the Superfinal. The Extraliga champion qualifies for the Champions Cup. If the same team wins both the league and the Czech Floorball Cup, the league runner-up also qualifies.

The bottom four teams from the regular season (9th to 12th place) compete in the play-down (two rounds, each a best-of-seven series) to determine which team will be relegated directly to the 1st League (1. liga). The loser of the second round of the play-down is replaced by the 1st League champion. The runner-up of the 1st League then faces the winner of the Extraliga play-down second round in a promotion/relegation playoff (best-of-five series).

== Champions ==
List of champions in seasons of the league:

Season	Champions	Runner-up	Third place
1994–95	Tatran Střešovice	1. SC SSK Vítkovice	Sparta
1995–96	Tatran Střešovice	Sparta	1. SC SSK Vítkovice
1996–97	Tatran Střešovice	1. SC SSK Vítkovice	Sparta
1997–98	Tatran Střešovice	Sparta	FBC Liberec
1998–99	Tatran Střešovice	1. SC SSK Vítkovice	Sparta
1999–00	1. SC SSK Vítkovice	1. HFK Děkanka Inservis	Tatran Střešovice
2000–01	FBC Liberec CG	1. HFK Děkanka Inservis	1. SC SSK Vítkovice
2001–02	FBC Liberec Crazy Girls	Tatran Střešovice	1. HFK Děkanka Inservis
2002–03	FBC Liberec Crazy Girls	HFK Děkanka	Tatran Střešovice
2003–04	FBC Liberec Crazy Girls	Tatran Střešovice	1. SC SSK Vítkovice
2004–05	FBC Liberec Crazy Girls	Tatran Techtex Střešovice	FbŠ Praha
2005–06	FBC Liberec Crazy Girls	EVVA FbŠ Bohemians	Tatran Techtex Střešovice
2006–07	1. HFK CON Invest Děkanka Praha	FBC Liberec ALIAZ Crazy Girls	FbŠ EVVA Bohemians
2007–08	CON Invest Děkanka Praha	EVVA FbŠ Bohemians	FBC Liberec ALIAZ Crazy Girls
2008–09	CON Invest Děkanka Praha	TJ JM Chodov	EVVA FBŠ Bohemians
2009–10	Herbadent Tigers SJM	FBŠ Bohemians	1. SC WOOW Vítkovice
2010–11	Herbadent SJM Praha 11	FbŠ ROPRO Bohemians	1. SC WOOW Vítkovice
2011–12	Herbadent SJM Praha 11	FbŠ ROPRO Bohemians	1. SC WOOW Vítkovice
2012–13	Herbadent SJM Praha 11	1. SC WOOW Vítkovice	TJ JM Chodov
2013–14	1. SC WOOW Vítkovice	Herbadent Praha 11 SJM	TJ JM Pedro Perez Chodov
2014–15	TJ JM FAT PIPE Chodov	Herbadent Praha 11 SJM	1. SC Vítkovice Oxdog
2015–16	1. SC Vítkovice Oxdog	FAT PIPE Florbal Chodov	Herbadent Praha 11 SJM
2016–17	TIGERS FK Jižní Město	1. SC TEMPISH Vítkovice	FAT PIPE Florbal Chodov
2017–18	1. SC TEMPISH Vítkovice	FAT PIPE Florbal Chodov	Ivanti Tigers FK Jižní Město
2018–19	1. SC TEMPISH Vítkovice	FAT PIPE Florbal Chodov	FBC ČPP Bystroň Group OSTRAVA
2019–20	The season was cancelled due to COVID-19 pandemic		
2020–21	1. SC TEMPISH Vítkovice	FAT PIPE Florbal Chodov	FBC ČPP Ostrava
2021–22	FBC ČPP Bystroň Group Ostrava	FAT PIPE Florbal Chodov	1. SC TEMPISH Vítkovice
2022–23	1. SC TEMPISH Vítkovice	FBC ČPP Bystroň Group Ostrava	FAT PIPE Florbal Chodov
2023–24	1. SC TEMPISH Vítkovice	FAT PIPE Florbal Chodov	FBC ČPP Bystroň Group Ostrava
2024–25	1. SC TEMPISH Vítkovice Natios	Logisteed Tatran Střešovice	FBC ČPP Bystroň Group Ostrava
2025–26	Bulldogs Brno	1. SC Natios Vítkovice	Logisteed Tatran Střešovice

== Titles ==
Team	Titles
1. SC Vítkovice	9
Tigers Jižní Město	8
FBC Liberec	6
Tatran Střešovice	5
Bulldogs Brno	1
FBC Ostrava	1
Florbal Chodov	1

== Teams ==
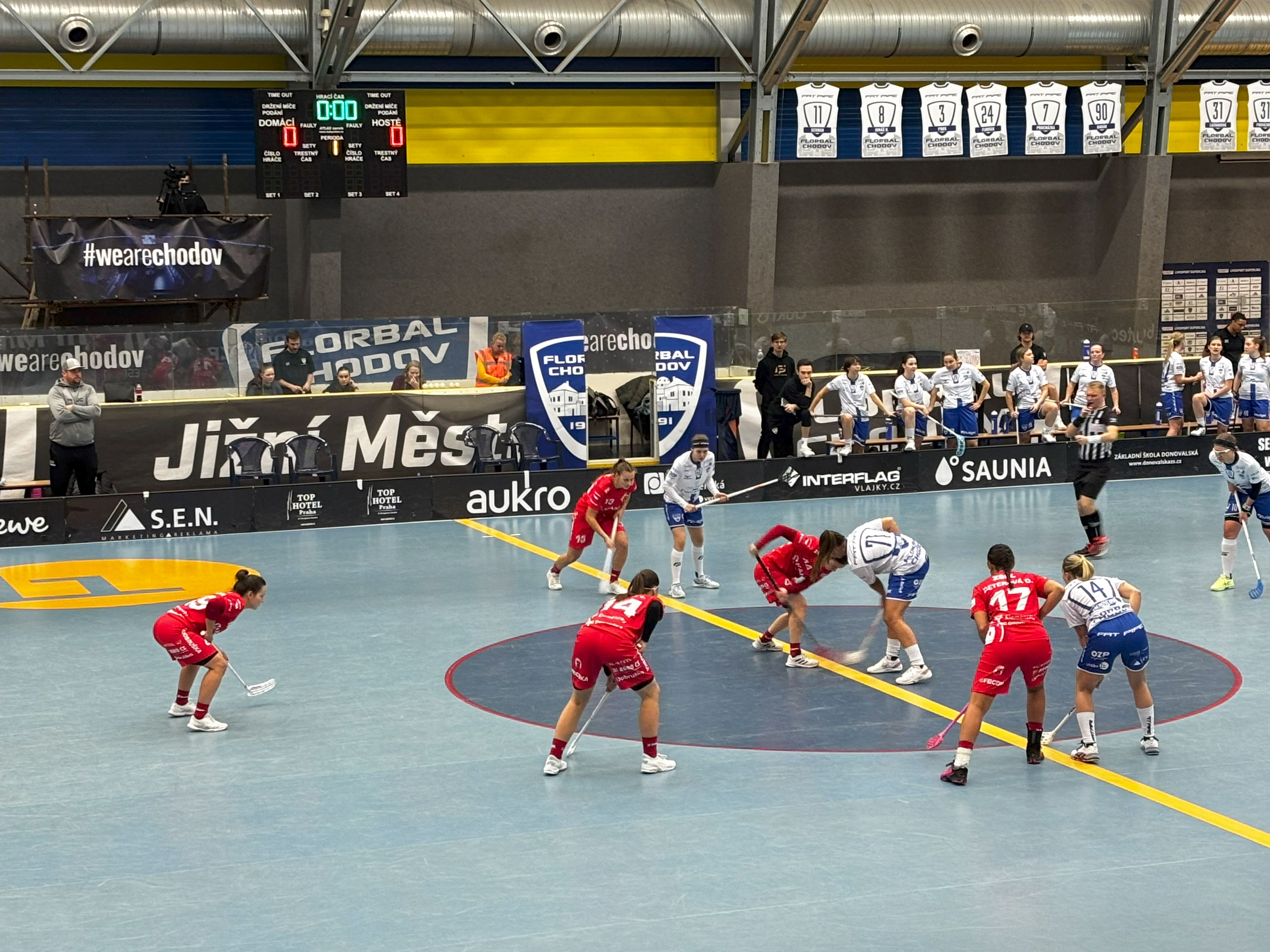
Regular season match: Florbal Chodov vs FBC Dobruška in the 2024–25 season

Teams in season 2026–27:

- 1. SC Tempish Vítkovice Natios (Ostrava)
- Bulldogs Brno
- Crazy Girls FBC Liberec (Liberec)
- FAT PIPE Florbal Chodov (Prague)
- FBC ČPP Bystroň Group Ostrava
- FBC Intevo Třinec
- FBS Olomouc
- FbŠ Bohemians (Prague)
- GMS Florbal Chomutov (Chomutov)
- K1 Florbal Židenice (Brno)
- Prague Tigers Nehvizdy (Prague)
- Tatran Střešovice (Prague)

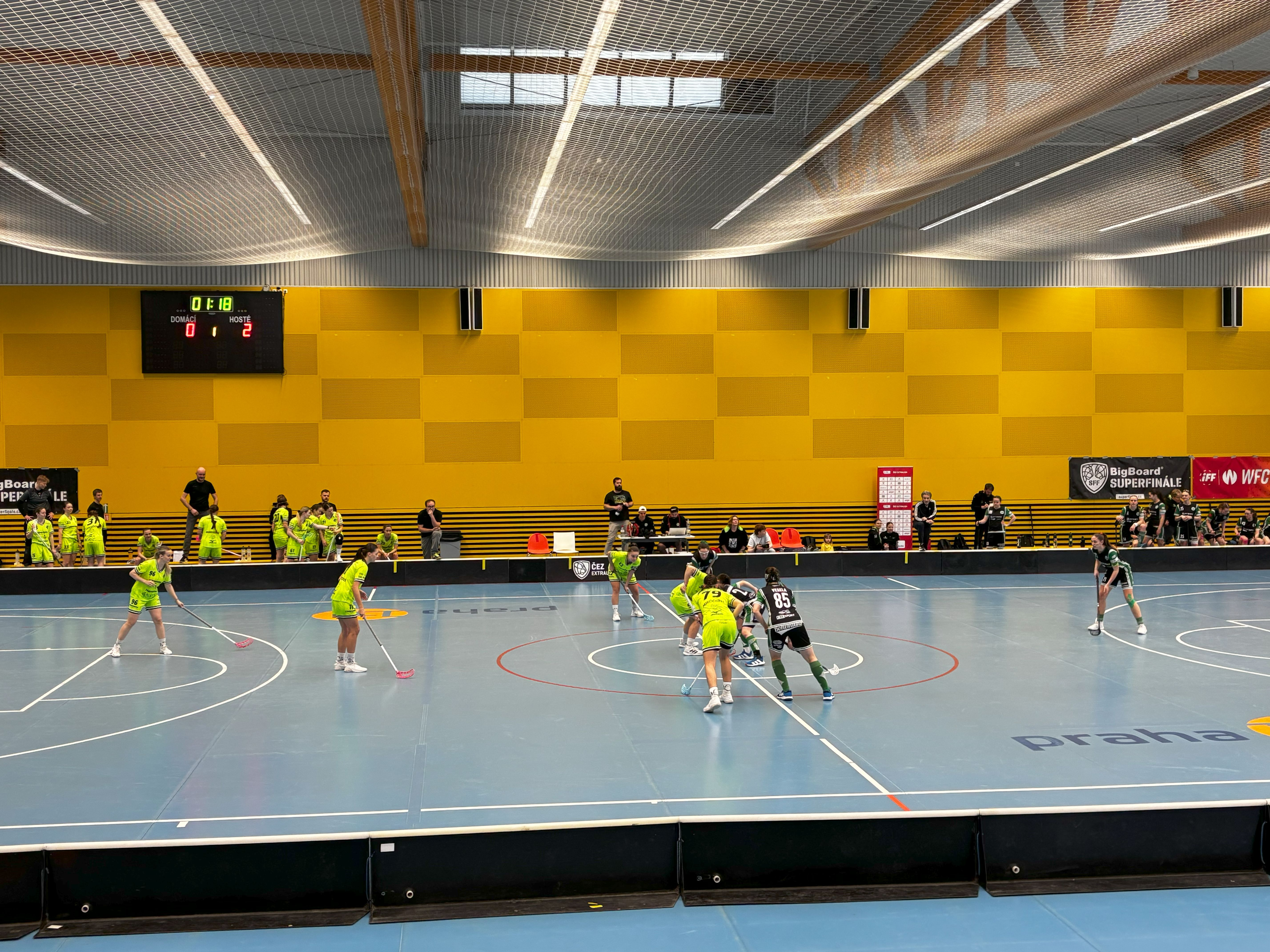
Quarterfinal match FbŠ Bohemians vs 1. SC Vítkovice in the 2024–25 season

Location of the 2025–26 Extraliga žen ve florbale teams.

== See also ==
- Superliga florbalu
