= Bulldogs Brno =

Czech floorball club

- Founded: 1993
- Arena: Sportovní hala Vodova (men); SH SportPoint (women)
- Capacity: 2,900
- Coach: Men: Adam Konečný; Women: Martin Czeczinkar
- League: Men: 1. liga mužů Women: Extraliga žen

Bulldogs Brno is a floorball club based in Brno, Czech Republic. The team was founded in 1993.

The men's team has played in the second-highest division, the 1. liga mužů, since the 2025–26 season, returning there after one season in the Superliga florbalu. Previously, the team played Superliga already in 25 seasons from 1995–96 to 2018–19 and also in the league's first season in 1993–94. The team has reached semifinals three times, in seasons 2004–05, 2014–15 and 2015–16.

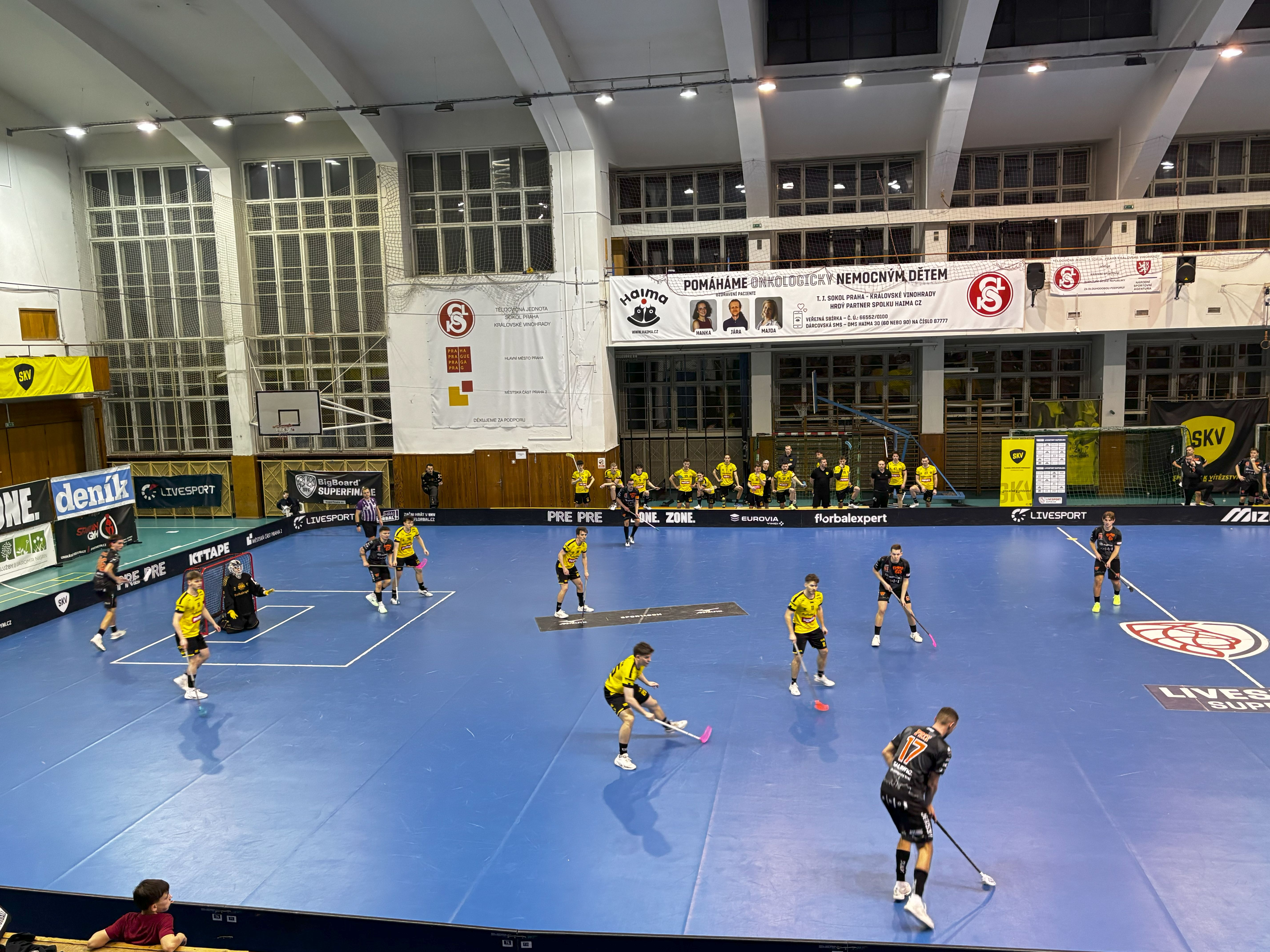
Men's team (in black) in the 2024–25 season

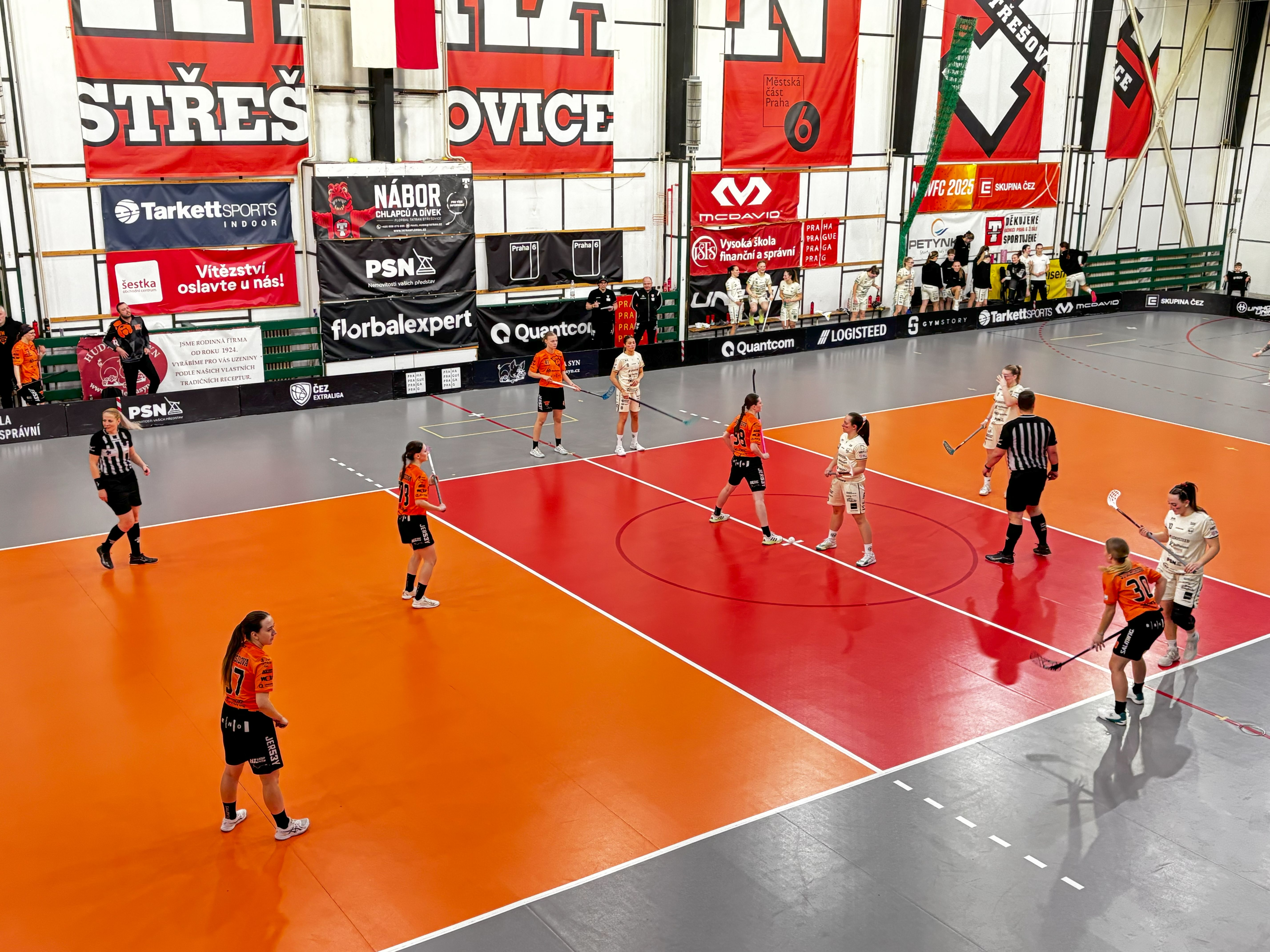
Women's team (in orange) in the 2024–25 away quarterfinal

The women's team plays the highest Czech floorball league Extraliga žen since 2019. Previously, the team played Extraliga already from its first season until 2008. The team has reached quarterfinals six times, in seasons 2002–03 through 2005–06, 2022–23 and 2023–24.

== Honours ==
Men's titles:

- Pohár Českého florbalu (Czech Floorball Cup): 2009–10 (2nd place), 2010–11 (2nd place), 2012–13 (2nd place), 2014–15 (2nd place)

Women's titles:

- Extraliga žen ve florbale: 2025–26

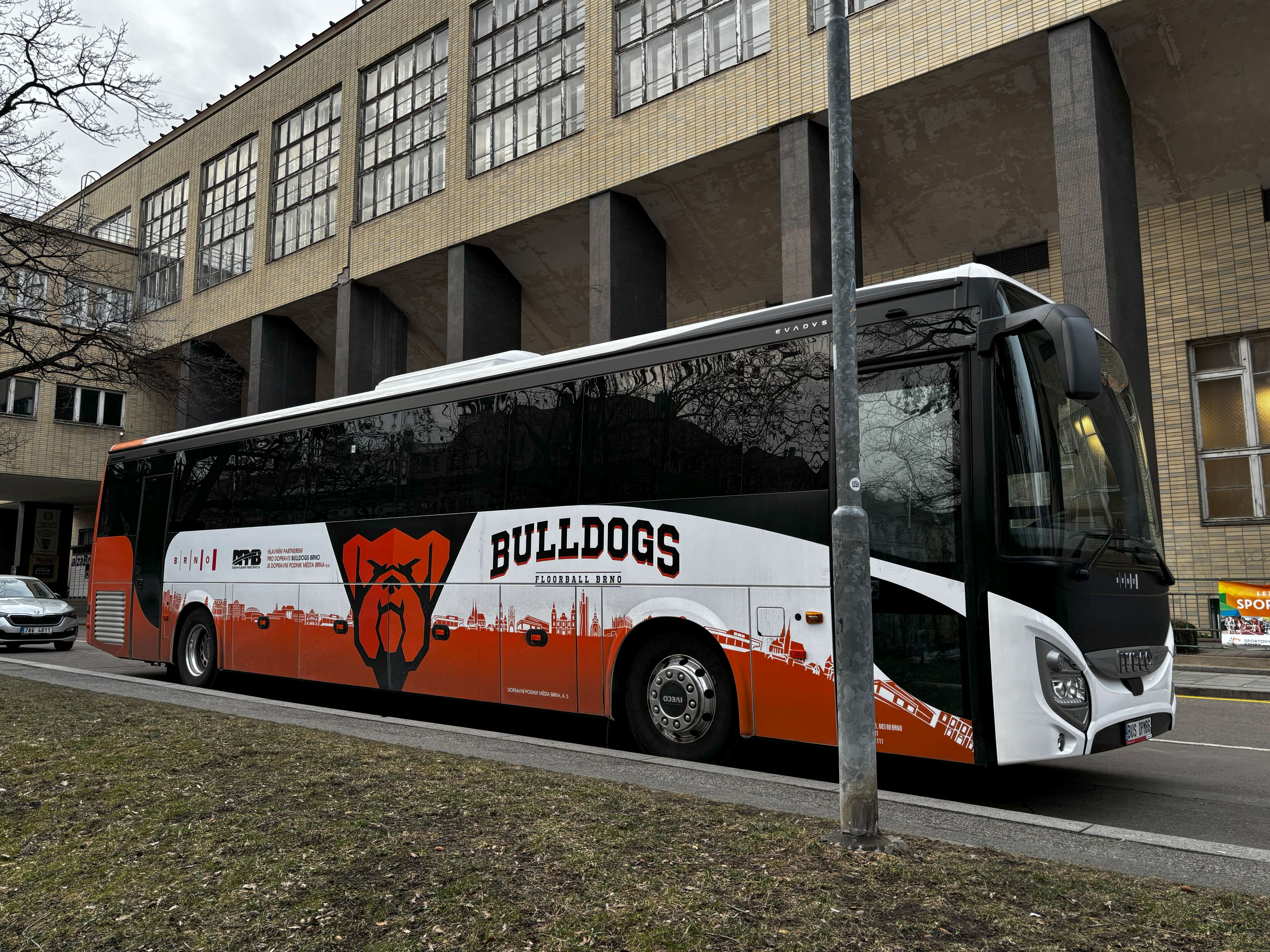
Club bus

== Name ==
- 1993–2000: VSK FS Brno
- 2001–2011: Bulldogs Brno
- 2012–2017: itelligence Bulldogs Brno
- 2018–present: Bulldogs Brno
