= Superliga florbalu =

Highest of the Czech men's floorball leagues

Livesport Superliga
- Sport: Floorball
- Founded: 1993; 33 years ago
- Administrator: Český florbal
- No. of teams: 14
- Country: Czech Republic
- Continent: Europe
- Most recent champion: Florbal MB (5th title) (2025–26)
- Most titles: Tatran Střešovice (18 titles)
- Broadcasters: ČT Sport, Sporty TV
- Streaming partner: Český florbal TV
- Sponsor: Livesport
- Level on pyramid: Level 1
- Relegation to: 1. liga mužů
- Domestic cup: Pohár Českého florbalu
- International cup: Champions Cup
- Website: Livesport Superliga

Superliga florbalu (also Livesport Superliga) is the highest-level men's floorball league in the Czech Republic.

The league consists of 14 teams. Since the competition's foundation in 1993, a total of 42 teams have participated. Only four of these teams have played in the league continuously since its inaugural season: 1. SC Vítkovice, Florbal Chodov, FBC Ostrava, and Tatran Střešovice.

Four teams have won the championship title in the league's history: Tatran Střešovice (18 titles, most recently in the 2023–24 season), 1. SC Vítkovice (seven titles, most recently in the 2018–19 season), Florbal MB (five titles, most recently in the 2025–26 season), and Florbal Chodov (two titles, most recently in the 2016–17 season). Until the 2011–12 season, Tatran was the dominant team in the Superliga (then known as the Extraliga), winning every season except for 1995–96, 1996–97, 1999–00, and 2008–09, when the title was claimed by Vítkovice. Florbal MB is the only team to have started in a lower division and successfully won the Superliga.

The champion of the league is eligible to compete at the Champions Cup.

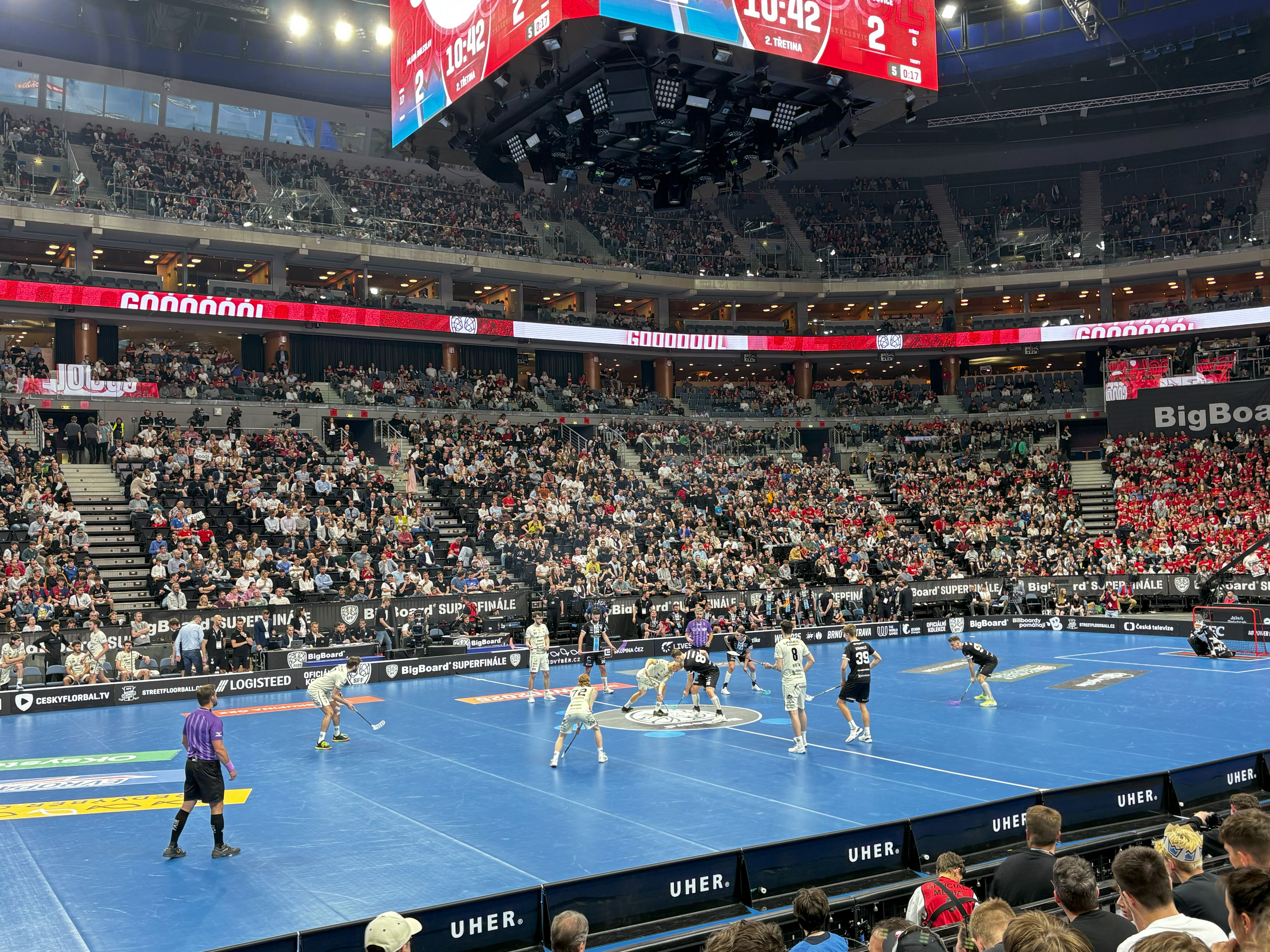
Superfinal match Florbal MB vs. Tatran Střešovice in 2024–25 season

== Naming and sponsorship ==
The name of the league is leased to a general sponsor and changes frequently.

- 1993 – 2005: 1. liga
- 2005 – 2012: Fortuna liga
- 2012 – 2015: AutoCont extraliga
- 2015 – 2019: Tipsport Superliga
- 2019: Superliga florbalu
- 2020 – current: Livesport Superliga

== Season structure ==
In the regular season, which takes place from approximately September to March, all teams play each other twice (a total of 26 rounds). Teams receive 3 points for a win, 2 points for an overtime win, and 1 point for an overtime loss. The winner of the regular season is awarded the Presidential Cup.

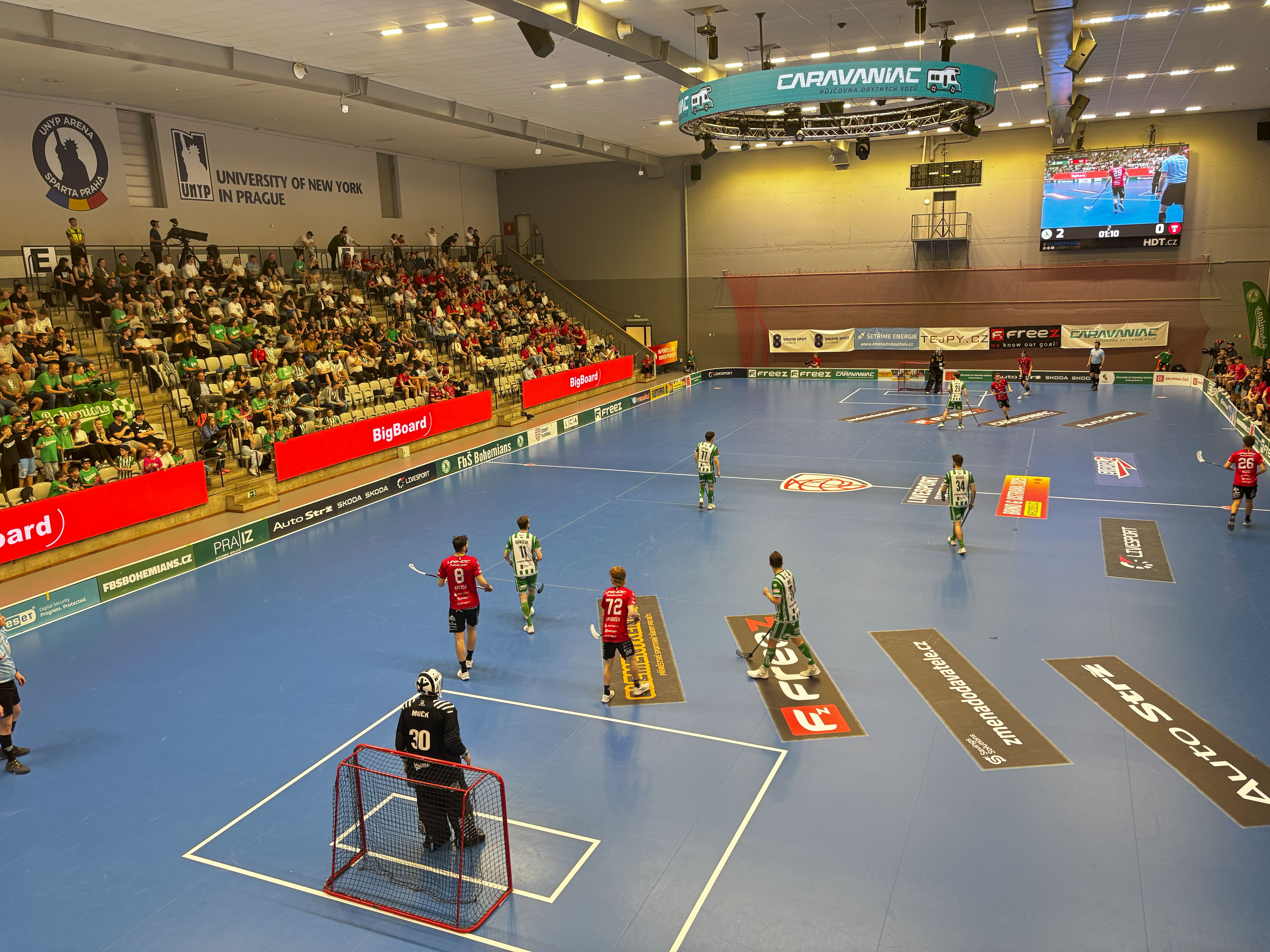
Semifinal match FbŠ Bohemians vs. Tatran Střešovice in 2024–25 season

After the regular season, the top ten advance to the play-offs, which typically begin in March and culminate in April. The top six teams qualify directly for the quarter-finals. The teams ranked seventh and tenth, and the teams ranked eighth and ninth, play a preliminary round (best-of-three series) for the remaining two spots in the quarterfinals. After the preliminary round, the top three teams from the regular season successively choose their quarterfinal opponents from the four remaining teams, taking into account factors such as geographical proximity, current form, and other aspects. Similarly, in the semifinals, the highest-ranked remaining team from the regular season selects its opponent from the two lowest-ranked advancing teams. Both the quarterfinals and semifinals are played as best-of-seven series. The final is a single match, held together with the Women's Extraliga žen as part of an event called the Superfinal. The Superliga champion qualifies for the Champions Cup. If the same team wins both the league and the Czech Floorball Cup, the league runner-up also qualifies.

The bottom four teams from the regular season (11th to 14th place) compete in the play-down (two rounds, each a best-of-seven series) to determine which team will be relegated directly to the 1st Men's League (1. liga mužů). The loser of the second round of the play-down is replaced by the 1st League champion. The runner-up of the 1st league then faces the winner of the Superliga play-down second round in a promotion/relegation playoff (best-of-five series).

== Teams ==
Location of the Superliga teams.

Teams in season 2025–26:

- 1. SC Natios Vítkovice (Ostrava)
- ACEMA Sparta Praha (Prague)
- BA SOKOLI Pardubice (Pardubice)
- ESA logistika Tatran Střešovice (Prague)
- FAT PIPE Florbal Chodov (Prague)
- FBC 4CLEAN Česká Lípa (Česká Lípa)
- FBC ČPP Bystroň Group Ostrava
- FBC Liberec (Liberec)
- FBŠ Hummel Hattrick Brno (Brno)
- Florbal Ústí (Ústí nad Labem)
- HDT.cz Florbal Vary Bohemians (Karlovy Vary)
- Kanonýři Kladno (Kladno)
- Předvýběr.CZ Florbal MB (Mladá Boleslav)
- TJ Sokol Královské Vinohrady (Prague)

== Medalists ==
List of medalists in seasons of the league:

Season	Champions	Runner-up	Third place
1993–94	IBK Forza Tatran	Dream Team Ostrava	1. SC Ostrava
1994–95	TJ Tatran Střešovice	FBC Ostrava	1. SC Ostrava
1995–96	1. SC Ostrava	Dream Team Ostrava	TJ Tatran Střešovice
1996–97	1. SC SSK Vítkovice	TJ Tatran Střešovice	Mentos Praha
1997–98	TJ Tatran Střešovice	1. SC SSK Vítkovice	TJ JM Chodov
1998–99	TJ Tatran Střešovice	FBC Ostrava	1. SC SSK Vítkovice
1999–00	1. SC SSK Vítkovice	TJ Tatran Střešovice	FBC Ostrava
2000–01	TJ Tatran Střešovice	Akcent Sparta Praha	1. SC SSK Vítkovice
2001–02	TJ Tatran Střešovice	Torpedo Havířov	FBC Ostrava
2002–03	TJ Tatran Střešovice	FBC Ostrava	1. SC SSK Vítkovice
2003–04	TJ Tatran Střešovice	FBC Ostrava	SSK Future
2004–05	TJ Tatran Střešovice	FBC Ostrava	1. SC SSK Vítkovice
2005–06	TJ Tatran Střešovice	FBC Ostrava	FBK Sokol Mladá Boleslav
2006–07	TJ Tatran Střešovice	Torpedo Havířov	FBC Ostrava
2007–08	TJ Tatran Střešovice	1. SC SSK Vítkovice	FBK Sokol Mladá Boleslav
2008–09	1. SC SSK Vítkovice	TJ Tatran Střešovice	SSK Future
2009–10	TJ Tatran Střešovice	1. SC SSK Vítkovice	FBK Sokol Mladá Boleslav
2010–11	Tatran Střešovice	FBC Remedicum Ostrava	1. SC WOOW Vítkovice
2011–12	Tatran Omlux Střešovice	1. SC WOOW Vítkovice	TJ JM Pedro Peréz Chodov
2012–13	1. SC WOOW Vítkovice	TJ JM Pedro Peréz Chodov	Tatran Střešovice
2013–14	1. SC WOOW Vítkovice	Tatran Omlux Střešovice	BILLY BOY Mladá Boleslav
2014–15	Tatran Střešovice	BILLY BOY Mladá Boleslav	1. SC Vítkovice Oxdog
2015–16	FAT PIPE Florbal Chodov	1. SC Vítkovice Oxdog	Technology Florbal MB
2016–17	FAT PIPE Florbal Chodov	Technology Florbal MB	Tatran Omlux Střešovice
2017–18	Technology Florbal MB	1. SC TEMPISH Vítkovice	FAT PIPE Florbal Chodov
2018–19	1. SC TEMPISH Vítkovice	Technology Florbal MB	ACEMA Sparta Praha
2019–20	The season was cancelled due to COVID-19 pandemic		
2020–21	Předvýběr.CZ Florbal MB	1. SC TEMPISH Vítkovice	FAT PIPE Florbal Chodov
2021–22	Předvýběr.CZ Florbal MB	Tatran Střešovice	1. SC TEMPISH Vítkovice
2022–23	Tatran Střešovice	1. SC TEMPISH Vítkovice	Předvýběr.CZ Florbal MB
2023–24	ESA logistika Tatran Střešovice	Předvýběr.CZ Florbal MB	1. SC TEMPISH Vítkovice
2024–25	Předvýběr.CZ Florbal MB	ESA logistika Tatran Střešovice	FbŠ Bohemians
2025–26	Předvýběr.CZ Florbal MB	ESA logistika Tatran Střešovice	HDT.cz Florbal Vary Bohemians

== Titles ==
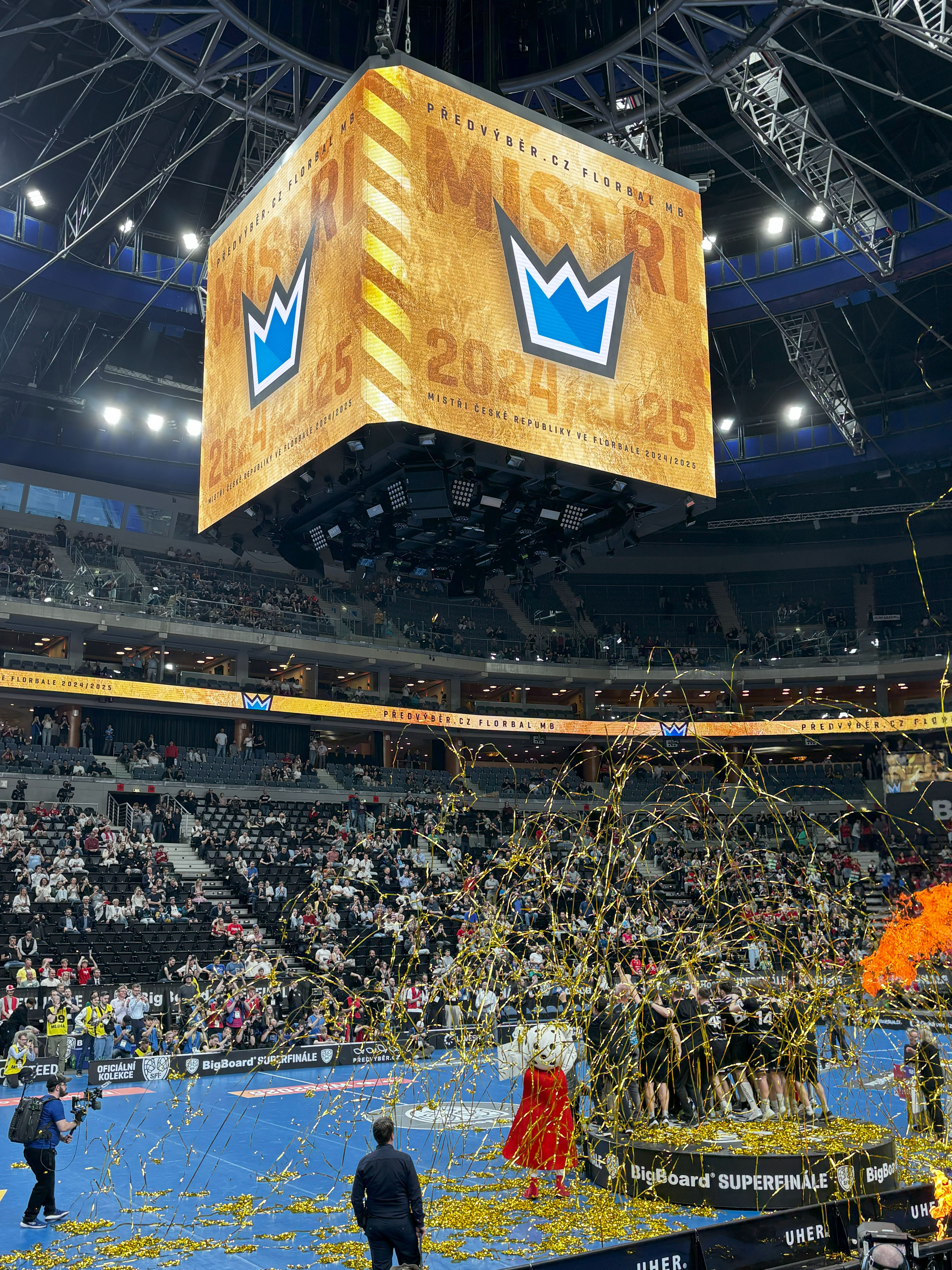
Awarding of gold medals to the team Florbal MB in 2024–25 season

Team	Titles	Season
Tatran Střešovice	18	1993–94, 1994–95, 1997–98, 1998–99, 2000–01, 2001–02, 2002–03, 2003–04, 2004–05, 2005–06, 2006–07, 2007–08, 2009–10, 2010–11, 2011–12, 2014–15, 2022–23, 2023–24
1. SC Vítkovice	7	1995–96, 1996–97, 1999–00, 2008–09, 2012–13, 2013–14, 2018–19
Florbal MB	5	2017–18, 2020–21, 2021–22, 2024–25, 2025–26
Florbal Chodov	2	2015–16, 2016–17

== See also ==
- Extraliga žen ve florbale
