= Sportovní hala Fortuna =

Multi-purpose indoor arena in Prague, Czech Republic

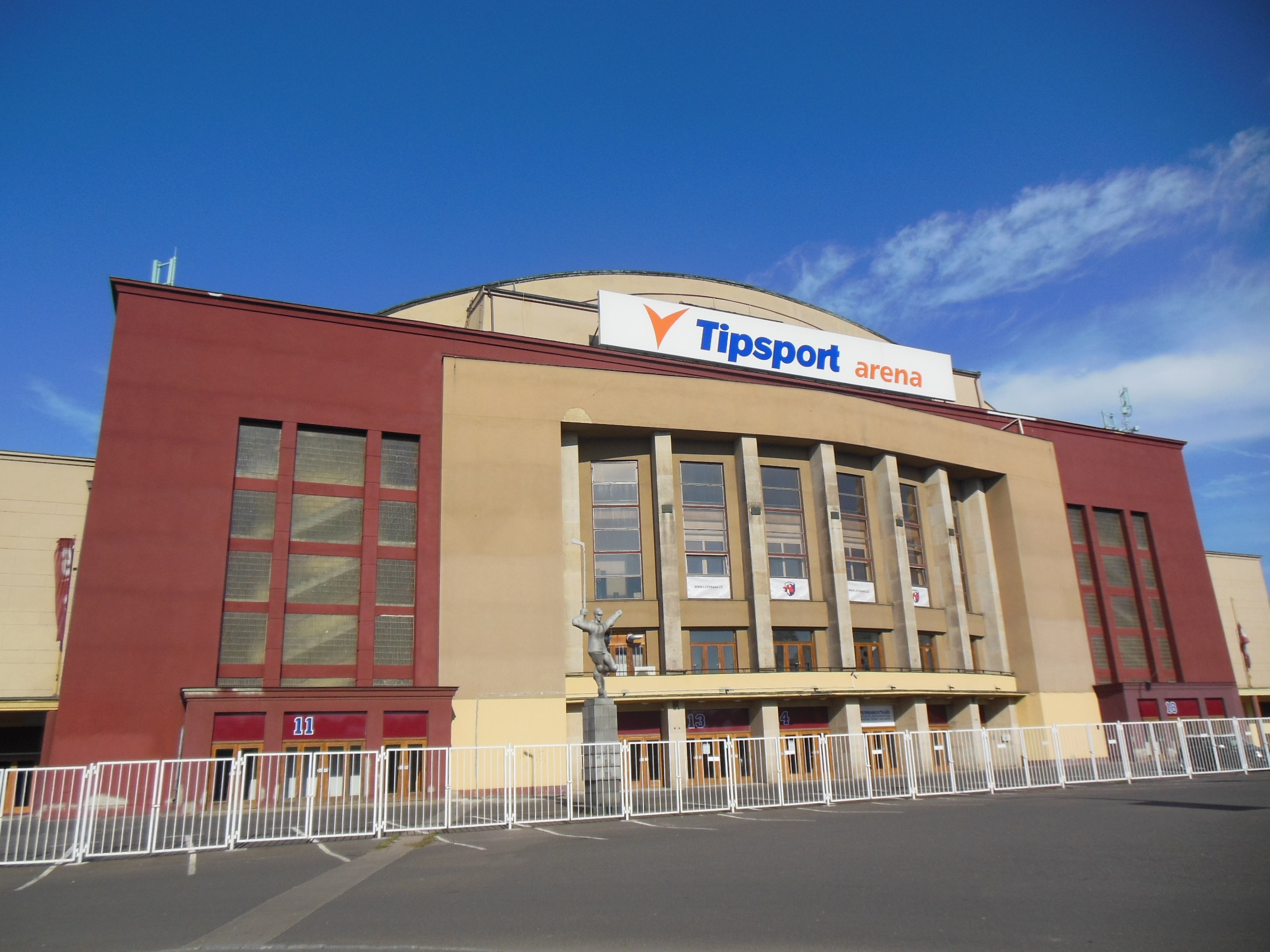
- Entrance to Sportovní hala Fortuna
- Interactive map of Sportovní hala Fortuna
- Former names: Sportovní hala ČSTV (1962–1999); Paegas Arena (1999–2002); T-Mobile Arena (2002–2008); Tesla Arena (2008–2011); Tipsport Arena (2011–2022); Sportovní hala Fortuna (2022–present)
- Location: Za elektrárnou 419/1 170 00 Prague 7-Bubeneč, Czech Republic
- Coordinates: 50.10705°N 14.433653°E
- Owner: City of Prague
- Capacity: Ice hockey: 13,238
- Surface: Versatile
- Field size: 29 x 60 m

Construction
- Built: 1953–1962
- Opened: 7 March 1962
- Architect: Holubec

Tenants
- HC Sparta Praha (1962–2015); HC Lev Praha (KHL) (2012–2014)

Sportovní hala Fortuna is a multi-purpose indoor arena in Prague, Czech Republic, whose naming rights are currently leased to Czech betting company Fortuna. It opened in 1962 with a capacity of 18,500. Its current capacity is 13,238 for ice hockey games. The arena hosted the Ice Hockey World Championships four times between 1972 and 1992. From 1962 to 2015, it was the home arena of Czech Extraliga team HC Sparta Praha and between 2012 and 2014 KHL's team HC Lev Praha.

== History ==
The arena, located on the fairgrounds in Bubeneč in the neighbourhood of Holešovice, opened on 7 March 1962 as Sportovní hala ČSTV with a capacity of 18,500 (14,000 seated). Its first major event was the 1962 World Figure Skating Championships, which began on 14 March of the same year. On 17 October 1962, the hall began to host home matches of ice hockey side HC Sparta Praha, the home team defeating rivals ZKL Brno 5–4 in the inaugural fixture. During its existence, the arena has hosted many important sporting events. It hosted the Ice Hockey World Championships four times: in 1972, 1978, 1985, and 1992, and for years hosted a prestigious annual figure skating competition. The arena hosted the 1980 Davis Cup final, where Czechoslovakia defeated Italy, 4–1.

Hundreds of concerts have also been staged at the arena during its history. It was the largest and most important arena in Czechoslovakia and the Czech Republic for over 40 years until the new O2 Arena opened in 2004. The arena kept the name Sportovní hala until 1999, subsequently entering into title sponsorship agreements.

== Notable events ==
- 1962 World Figure Skating Championships
- 1967 European Indoor Games
- 1972 Ice Hockey World Championships
- 1978 Ice Hockey World Championships
- Final of the 1980 Davis Cup, 5–7 December 1980
- 1981 FIBA European Championship
- 1985 Ice Hockey World Championships
- 1992 Men's Ice Hockey World Championships
- 1993 World Figure Skating Championships
- 2007 Czech Open

== Gallery ==
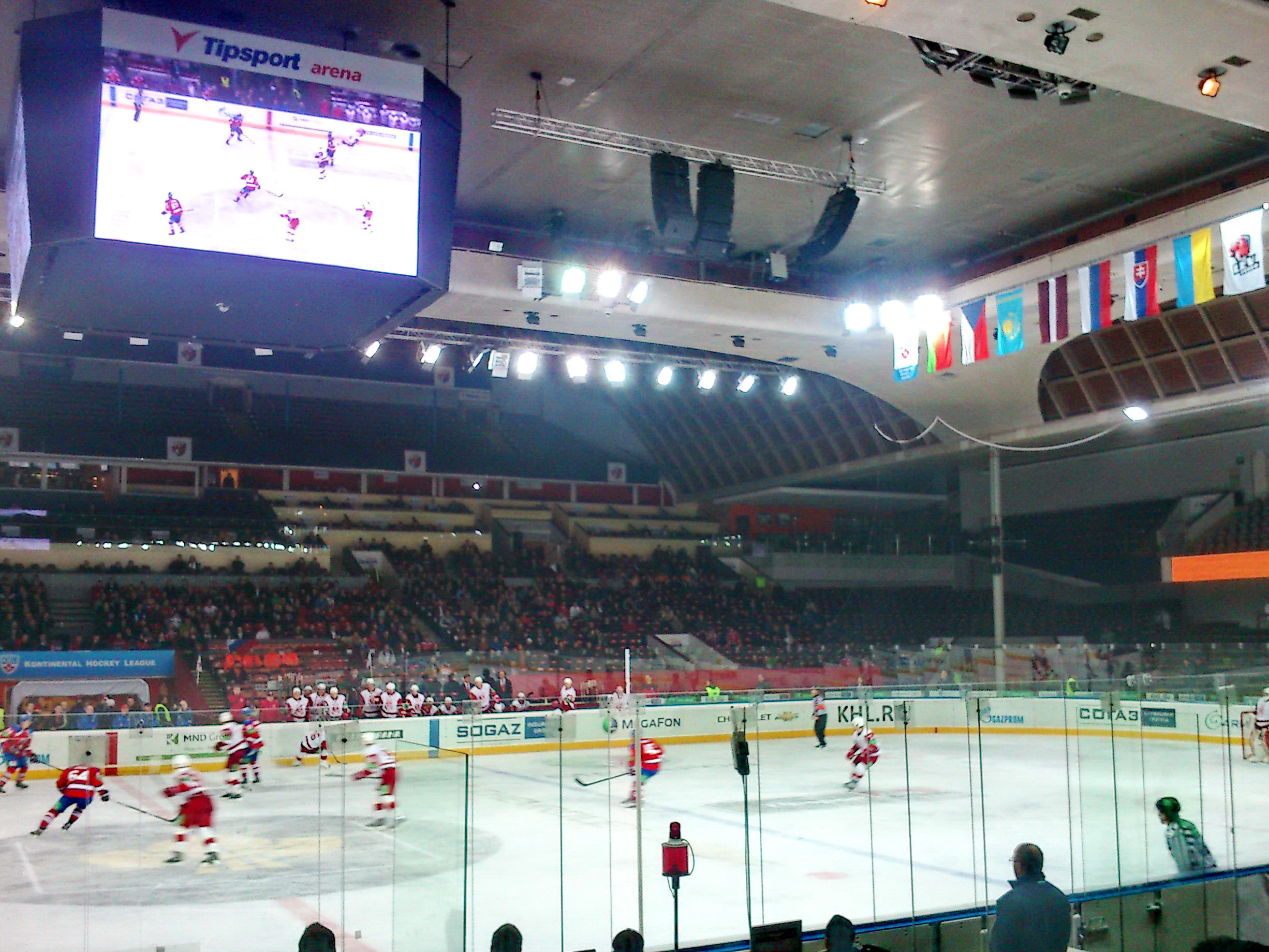
HC Lev Praha playing KHL ice hockey against Vityaz Chekhov inside the arena in January 2013

== See also ==
- List of indoor arenas in the Czech Republic

Events and tenants
Preceded by Westfalenhalle; Dortmund	European Indoor Games; Venue; 1967	Succeeded by Palacio de Deportes; Madrid
Preceded by Civic Auditorium; San Francisco	Davis Cup; Final Venue; 1980	Succeeded by Riverfront Coliseum; Cincinnati
Preceded by Oakland Coliseum Arena; Oakland	World Figure Skating Championships; Venue; 1993	Succeeded by Nippon Convention Center; Chiba
