= UHC =

UHC may refer to:

== Companies ==
- Union Hand-Roasted Coffee, a British coffee roasting company in East London
- UnitedHealthcare, brand of U.S. health insurer UnitedHealth Group
- University HealthSystem Consortium, one of the predecessor companies for Vizient, Inc.

== Computing ==
- Unified Hangul Code, Windows character encoding for Korean
- UDP Host Cache, technique used by file sharing networks such as Gnutella
- Utrecht Haskell Compiler, an implementation of the Haskell programming language

== Hospitals ==
- University Hospital Coventry, hospital in Coventry, West Midlands
- University Hospital Crosshouse, hospital in Kilmarnock, Scotland
- University Hospitals of Cleveland, a major not-for-profit medical complex in Cleveland, Ohio

== Places ==
- Upper Hat Creek, rural locality in British Columbia, Canada
- Upper Hopkins Cascade, a waterfall found in the Borer's Falls Conservation Area in Flamborough, Hamilton, Ontario

== Sports ==
- UHC Stockerau, a women's handball club from Stockerau in Austria
- UHC Waldkirch-St. Gallen, a Swiss floorball team
- UHC Zugerland, a Swiss floorball club from the canton of Zug
- UNC Health Care, a not-for-profit medical system owned by the State of North Carolina and based in Chapel Hill
- UCW-Zero Heavyweight Championship, a professional wrestling championship
- UWF Heavyweight Championship, a professional wrestling championship
- UniKL Hockey Club, a field hockey League from Kuala Lumpur, Malaysia
- United Hospitals Cup, rugby cup contested by the six medical schools in London
- Utah Hockey Club, now known as Utah Mammoth, a professional ice hockey team based in Salt Lake City, Utah

== Other ==
- Universal health care, a social-benefit program
- UHC Day - International Universal Health Coverage Day, Dec. 12
- Unburned hydrocarbon, a category of toxic engine emission
- Ultimate Holding Company, a British arts collective known for «This is Camp X-Ray» and «Ext-inked»
- Upper Hutt College, a secondary school in Upper Hutt, New Zealand
- Uttarakhand High Court, a superior court in the state of Uttarakhand, India
- Ultra Hardcore, a type of Minecraft server gamemode
- Ultra high contrast or UHC filter

== See also ==
- United Hebrew Congregation (disambiguation)
- CUH (disambiguation)
- HCU (disambiguation)
- HUC (disambiguation)
- UCH (disambiguation)
