= Kuper =

Kuper may refer to:

== People ==
- Augustus Kuper (1809–1885), British naval officer
- Adam Kuper (born 1941), British anthropologist
- André Kuper (born 1960), German politician
- Doreen Kuper, Solomon Islands entrepreneur and cultural mediator
- Hilda Kuper (1911–1992), Swazi anthropologist
- Leo Kuper (1908–1994), South African sociologist
- Peter Kuper (born 1958), U.S. comics artist
- Richard Kuper, South-African-born activist, educator and publisher
- Simon Kuper, British author and journalist
- Simon Meyer Kuper (1906–1963), South African judge
- Heinrich Küper (1888–1950), German adventurer

== Places ==
- Kuper, Iran, a village in West Azerbaijan Province, Iran
- Kuper Island, between Vancouver Island and the coast of British Columbia
