= 2025–26 Men's Floorball Champions Cup =

European floorball tournament

Men's Floorball Champions Cup
- 2025–26

Tournament information
- Sport: Floorball
- Dates: 24 August 2025–24 January 2026
- Teams: 8

Final positions
- Champions: (Sweden) Storvreta IBK (5th title)
- Runner-up: (Sweden) IBF Falun

Tournament statistics
- Matches played: 13

The 2025–26 Men's Floorball Champions Cup was the 31st edition of the premier competition for floorball clubs and the third in a format for league and cup winners.

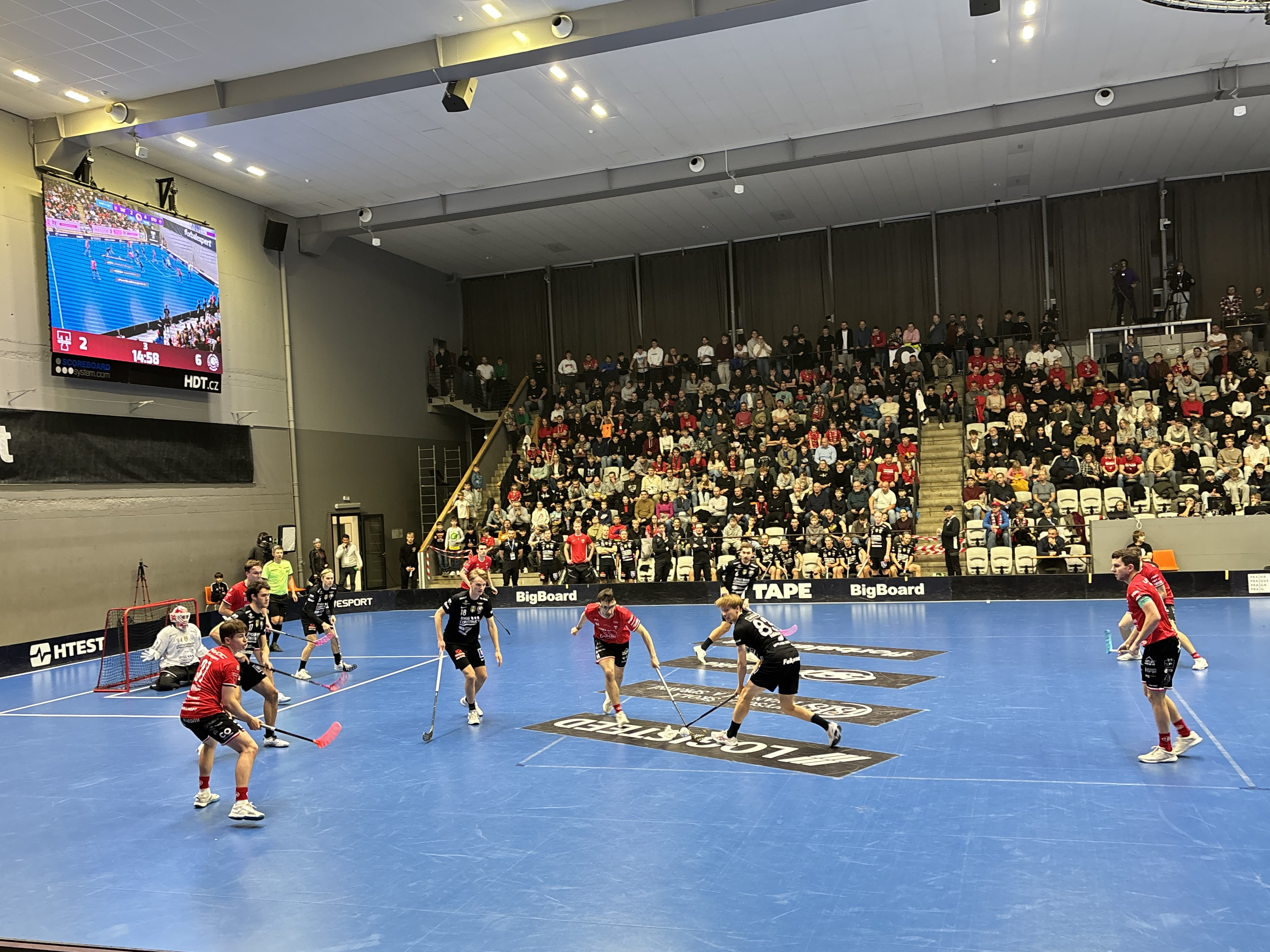
Semifinal match between Tatran Střešovice (in red) and Storvreta IBK (in black) in Prague

Storvreta IBK won the title after defeating IBF Falun in an all-Swedish final. With their fifth title, Storvreta equaled Falun's record. Storvreta had last won the cup in 2020.

== Format ==
The league champions and cup winners from four countries take part. If the same team wins the league and the cup in their country, the second-place team in the league also takes part.

For quarterfinals the eight teams are divided into two conferences based on their geographical location. The Swedish and Finnish teams take part in the Northern conference; the clubs from the Czech Republic and Switzerland play in the Southern conference. The four winners advance to the semifinals. Quarterfinals and semifinals are played in a home and away format. If a round is undecided after the two matches, the second match is followed by an overtime. The two semifinal winners play in a final held at a centralized venue.

== Teams ==
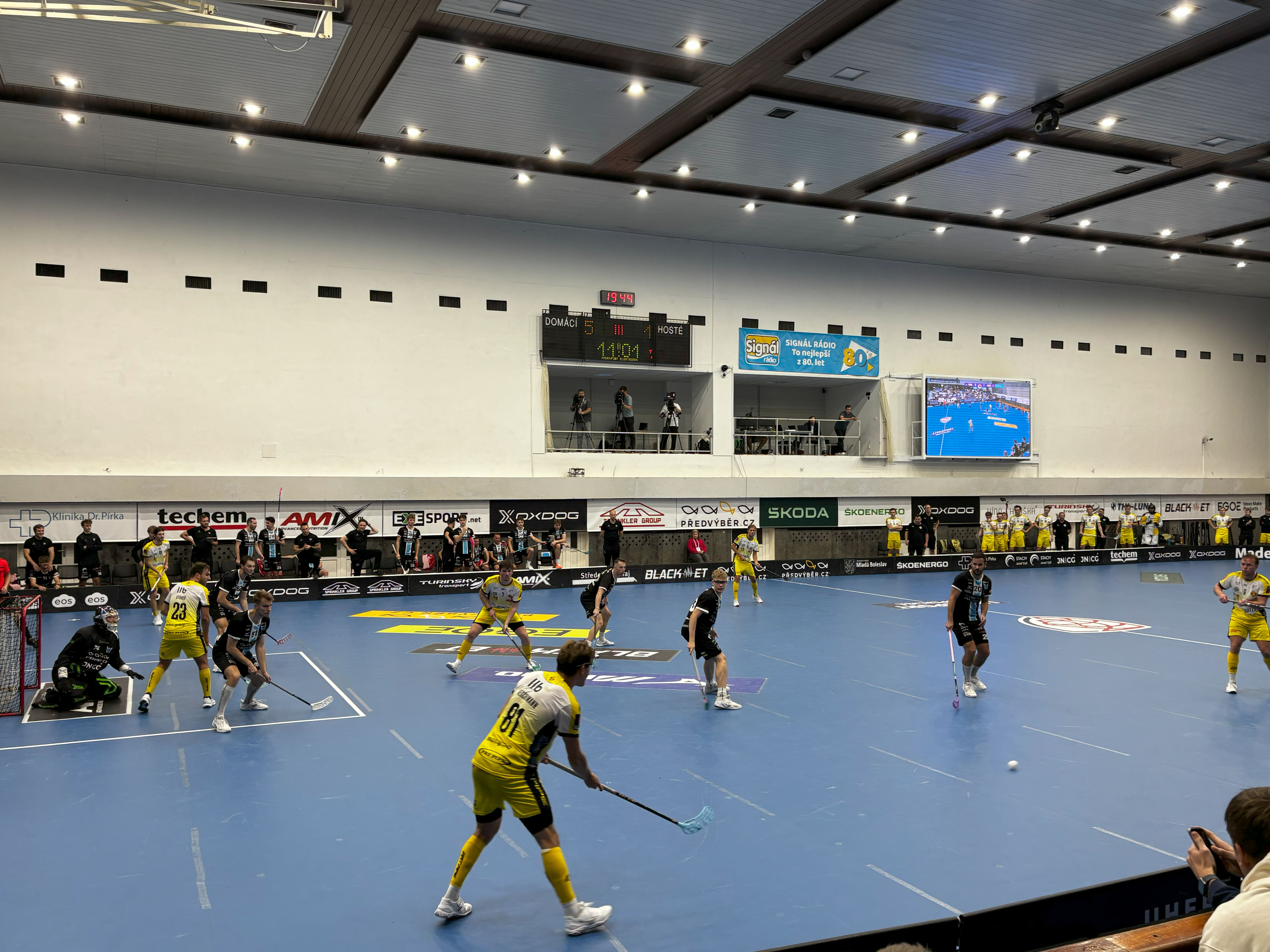
Teams Florbal MB (in black) and HC Rychenberg Winterthur (in yellow) in quarterfinal match in Mladá Boleslav

Location of teams of the 2025–26 Floorball Champions Cup.

| Conference | Country (League) | League Winner | Cup Winner |
|---|---|---|---|
| Northern | Sweden (Swedish Super League) | Storvreta IBK | IBF Falun |
| Northern | Finland (F-liiga) | Esport Oilers | Nokian KrP |
| Southern | Czech Republic (Livesport Superliga) | Florbal MB | Tatran Střešovice |
| Southern | Switzerland (Unihockey Prime League) | Zug United | HC Rychenberg Winterthur |

== Tournament ==
=== Bracket ===
Quarterfinals
(Finland) Esport Oilers | 4 | 6 | 1
(Sweden) IBF Falun | 6 | 3 | 1 PS
(Czech Republic) Florbal MB | 5 | 9 | 2
(Switzerland) HC Rychenberg Winterthur | 3 | 2 | 0
(Sweden) Storvreta IBK | 7 | 9 | 2
(Finland) Nokian KrP | 2 | 4 | 0
(Switzerland) Zug United | 4 | 6 | 0
(Czech Republic) Tatran Střešovice | 8 | 10 | 2

Semifinals
(Sweden) IBF Falun | 10 | 5 | 1
(Czech Republic) Florbal MB | 5 | 5 | 0
(Sweden) Storvreta IBK | 9 | 9 | 2
(Czech Republic) Tatran Střešovice | 3 | 3 | 0

Final
(Sweden) IBF Falun | 3
(Sweden) Storvreta IBK | 4 OT

All times are local – CET/CEST, unless stated otherwise.

=== Quarterfinals ===
| 24 August 2025; 16:00 | IBF Falun (Sweden) | 6–4 (0–1, 2–2, 4–1) | (Finland) Esport Oilers | Alla Pa Plan Arena, Falun; Attendance: 762 |

Game reference

| 30 August 2025; 16:00 EEST | Esport Oilers (Finland) | 6–3 (2–1, 1–0, 3–2) | (Sweden) IBF Falun | Tapiolan Urheiluhalli, Espoo; Attendance: 672 |

Game reference

1–1 in the series, IBF Falun won in penalty shootout.

| 20 September 2025; 18:00 | HC Rychenberg Winterthur (Switzerland) | 3–5 (1–0, 2–4, 0–1) | (Czech Republic) Florbal MB | AXA Arena, Winterthur; Attendance: 1,023 |

Game reference

| 27 September 2025; 18:00 | Florbal MB (Czech Republic) | 9–2 (2–1, 1–0, 6–1) | (Switzerland) HC Rychenberg Winterthur | MSH, Mladá Boleslav; Attendance: 658 |

Game reference

Florbal MB won the series 2–0.

| 24 August 2025; 15:00 EEST | Nokian KrP (Finland) | 2–7 (1–1, 1–1, 0–5) | (Sweden) Storvreta IBK | AGCO Power Arena, Nokia; Attendance: 877 |

Game reference

| 31 August 2025; 15:00 | Storvreta IBK (Sweden) | 9–4 (2–0, 3–1, 4–3) | (Finland) Nokian KrP | IFU Arena, Uppsala; Attendance: 905 |

Game reference

Storvreta IBK won the series 2–0.

| 20 September 2025; 19:00 | Tatran Střešovice (Czech Republic) | 8–4 (2–1, 1–1, 5–2) | (Switzerland) Zug United | Sportovní centrum Řepy, Prague; Attendance: 458 |

Game reference

| 23 September 2025; 20:00 | Zug United (Switzerland) | 6–10 (1–2, 0–4, 5–4) | (Czech Republic) Tatran Střešovice | Sporthalle Zug, Zug; Attendance: 445 |

Game reference

Tatran Střešovice won the series 0–2.

=== Semifinals ===
| 23 November 2025; 17:00 | Florbal MB (Czech Republic) | 5–10 (2–4, 2–2, 1–4) | (Sweden) IBF Falun | MSH, Mladá Boleslav; Attendance: 788 |

Game reference

| 27 November 2025; 18:30 | IBF Falun (Sweden) | 5–5 (2–3, 1–2, 2–0) | (Czech Republic) Florbal MB | UW-Tech Arena, Falun; Attendance: 857 |

Game reference

IBF Falun won the series 1–0.

| 18 November 2025; 18:30 | Storvreta IBK (Sweden) | 9–3 (4–1, 0–2, 5–0) | (Czech Republic) Tatran Střešovice | IFU Arena, Uppsala; Attendance: 538 |

Game reference

| 26 November 2025; 19:00 | Tatran Střešovice (Czech Republic) | 3–9 (1–2, 1–2, 1–5) | (Sweden) Storvreta IBK | UNYP Arena, Prague; Attendance: 1,400 |

Game reference

Storvreta IBK won the series 0–2.

=== Final ===
| 24 January 2026; 16:00 | IBF Falun (Sweden) | 3–4 SO (3–0, 0–1, 0–2, 0–1) | (Sweden) Storvreta IBK | UW-Tech Arena, Falun; Attendance: 2,348 |

Game reference

== EuroFloorball Cup ==
In 2025, the EuroFloorball Cup was reinstated for the winners of competitions from countries ranked lower in the IFF ranking. The EuroFloorball Cup was held as part of the Czech Open tournament in Prague.

| 1st place, gold medalist(s) | (Norway) Slevik IBK |
| 2nd place, silver medalist(s) | (Slovakia) Tsunami Záhorská Bystrica |
| 3rd place, bronze medalist(s) | (Poland) UKS Bankówka Zielonka |
| 4 | (Spain) CUF Leganés |
| 5 | (Netherlands) UFC Utrecht |
| 6 | (Ukraine) FBC Lemberg |
| 7 | (United Kingdom) London Sharks FC |

== See also ==
- 2025–26 Women's Floorball Champions Cup
