= Stephen Tataw =

Cameroonian footballer (1963–2020)

Personal information
- Full name: Stephen Tataw Eta
- Date of birth: 31 March 1963
- Place of birth: Yaoundé, Cameroon
- Date of death: 31 July 2020 (aged 57)
- Place of death: Yaoundé, Cameroon
- Height: 1.82 m (6 ft 0 in)
- Position: Right-back

Youth career
- 1984: Cammack of Kumba

Senior career*
Years	Team	Apps	(Gls)
1988–1991	Tonnerre Yaoundé		
1992–1994	Olympic Mvolyé		
1995–1996	Tosu Futures		

International career
1986–1994	Cameroon	63	(3)
Medal record
Men's football
Representing Cameroon
Africa Cup of Nations
Winner	1988 Morocco
- * Club domestic league appearances and goals

Stephen Tataw Eta (31 March 1963 – 31 July 2020) was a Cameroonian football right-back who played club football in his home country and Japan. He captained the Cameroon national team at the 1990 and 1994 editions of the FIFA World Cup. He was the first player from Africa to play for a Japanese club.

== Career ==
Tataw played with CAMARK of Kumba before joining Tonnerre Yaoundé from 1988 to 1991, and for Olympic Mvolyé from 1992 to 1994. Although Tonnerre were one of Cameroon's leading clubs, they lacked basic facilities; playing on a baked earth pitch in a stadium with no showers or dressing rooms. In 1991 Tataw was reported to earn £60-per-week, with another £100-per-week from a sinecure with Cameroon Radio Television.

In October 1990, Tataw joined English Football League First Division club Queens Park Rangers on trial. It was reported that he was "bemused" by the experience: "The manager, I forget his name [Don Howe], said I was good – excellent – but he was full up. I was a right-back and he did not need one. Why did he not tell me this before I came? Ask him. I was excellent." The following month he was reported to be on trial with Football League Second Division club Brighton & Hove Albion.

In Simon Kuper's Football Against the Enemy, Tataw is described playing for second tier Olympic Mvolyé. He was dragged from his car and beaten up by four armed men days before the 1992 Cameroonian Cup final against Diamant Yaoundé. He rebounded to captain his club in the match and played well, winning the penalty kick from which teammate Bertin Ebwellé struck the only goal.

In 1995, Tataw joined Tosu Futures of Japan. He became the first African footballer to play for a professional Japanese club. While he was in Japan, he tried to guide his club to the J-League, the top division. But in 1997, Tosu Futures folded due to the withdrawal of its main sponsor. He hoped to play for Sagan Tosu, the new club in the city, but he did not agree terms and retired.

=== International career ===
Tataw made his debut for the Cameroon national football team in December 1986, in a UDEAC Cup game against the Republic of the Congo in Malabo, Equatorial Guinea. He became a regular fixture in the side during the subsequent years.

Tataw's most successful and notable international tournament he participated in was the 1990 FIFA World Cup, in which he captained Cameroon as they became the first African nation to reach the tournament's quarterfinals. They began their campaign in Group B with the competition's opening match, against Argentina, who were the holders of the tournament as 1986 winners. The South Americans were heavy favourites to win the game but Cameroon achieved an upset victory, winning 1–0 through a François Omam-Biyik goal. They also won their next game, beating Romania 2–1 at the Stadio San Nicola in Bari, Roger Milla scoring twice in the space of ten minutes after coming on as a substitute. They suffered a 4–0 defeat against the Soviet Union in their final group game, but the two wins were sufficient for them to qualify for the next round as group winners. In their second round match they played Colombia and again Milla was the hero. After the match finished goalless in normal time, Milla again scored twice in quick succession in extra time, and despite a subsequent goal from Colombia, Cameroon held on to record a 2–1 victory. The quarter final game against England was a thriller. England took the lead through David Platt but Cameroon replied in the second half with two goals in four minutes to lead 2–1. An England penalty took the game to extra time, in which Cameroon conceded another spot-kick and were eliminated 3–2.

The Russia game at the 1994 World Cup was Tataw's last international cap. In total he played for the national team on 63 occasions, scoring three goals.

== Coaching career ==
In April 2018, Tataw was one of 77 applicants for the vacant Cameroon national team coaching job.

== Honours ==
Tonnerre Yaoundé

- Cameroon Cup: 1989, 1991 and 1992

Cameroon

- African Cup of Nations: 1988
