= HC Rychenberg Winterthur =

Swiss floorball club

- Founded: 1983
- League: Men: Unihockey Prime League
- Championships: Men: Unihockey Prime League (2026); Women: Unihockey Prime League (13 titles: 1987–1989, 1991–2000)

HC Rychenberg Winterthur (abbreviated as HCR) is a floorball club based in the Swiss city of Winterthur. The club was founded in 1983.

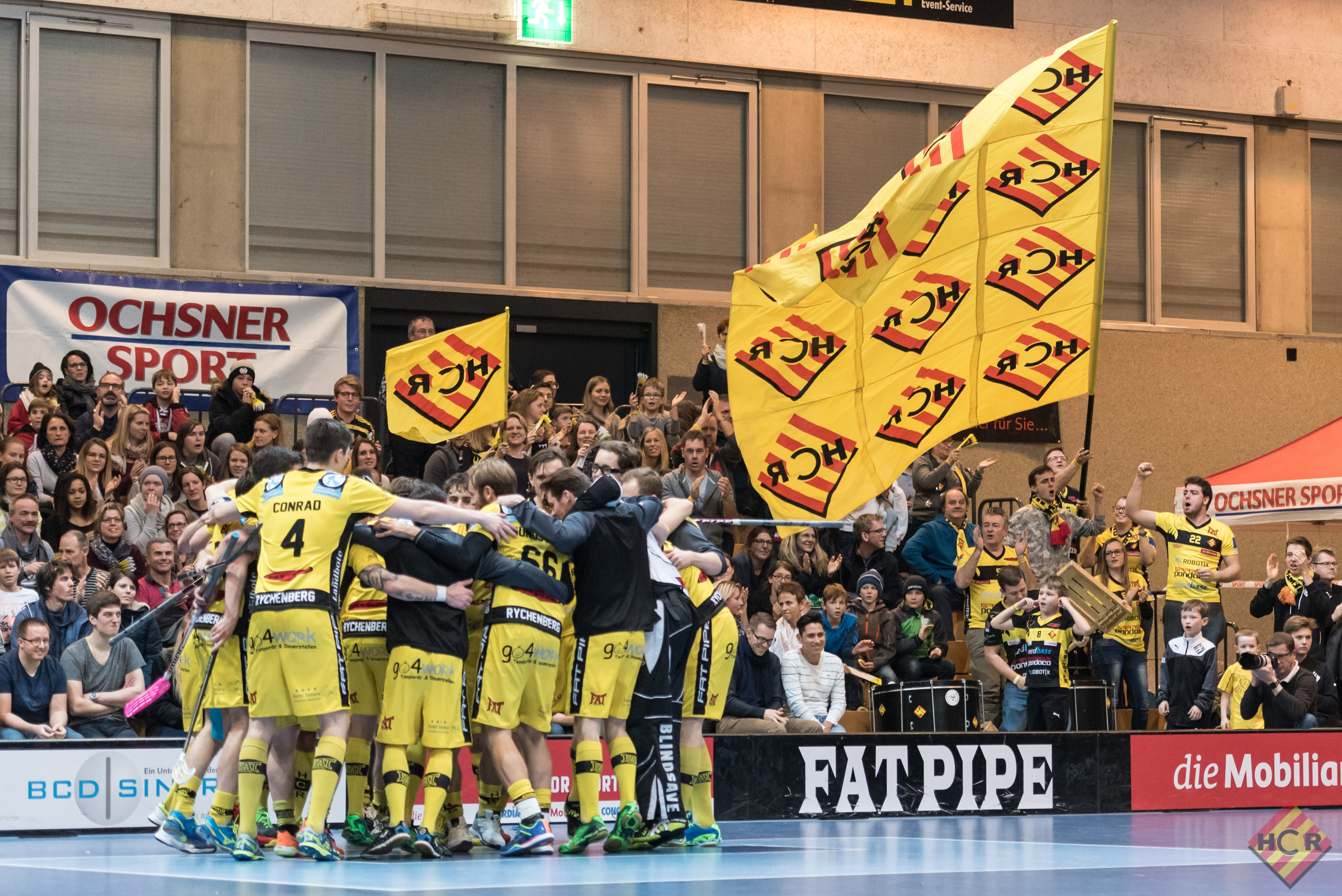
HC Rychenberg Winterthur players and fans in 2017

The men's team competes in the Unihockey Prime League, the top Swiss league, being the only club to play in the league continuously since its inception in 1983. In the 2025–26 season, they won their first championship title. Additionally, the team claimed four silver medals in 1986, 1992, 1993, and 2010, and won the Swiss Cup three times.

The women's team was founded in 1986, concurrent with the establishment of the women's league. The women won 13 titles in the first 14 seasons of the league, three Swiss Cups, and two silver medals at the European Cup, before separating into an independent club, Red Ants Rychenberg Winterthur, in 2000, where they continued their dominance.

== Men's Team ==
=== Recent Seasons ===
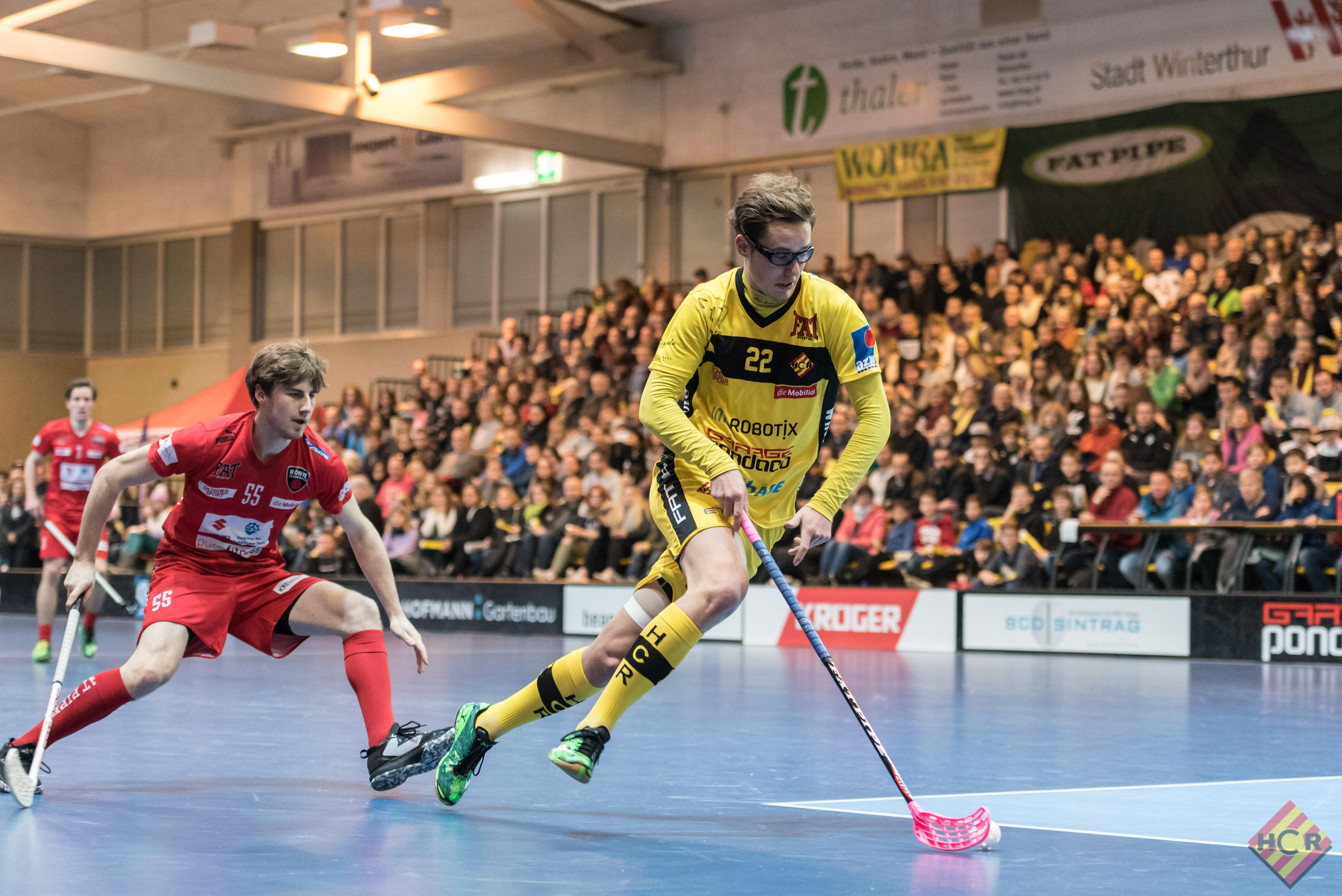
HC Rychenberg Winterthur player in 2017

Season	Rank	Note
2020–21	6th	Quarterfinal loss to UHC Alligator Malans
2021–22	5th	Quarterfinal loss to SV Wiler-Ersigen
2022–23	4th	Semifinal loss to Floorball Köniz
2023–24	5th	Quarterfinal loss to Floorball Thurgau
2024–25	6th	Quarterfinal loss to Floorball Köniz Bern
2025–26	1st	Champions – defeated Zug United in final

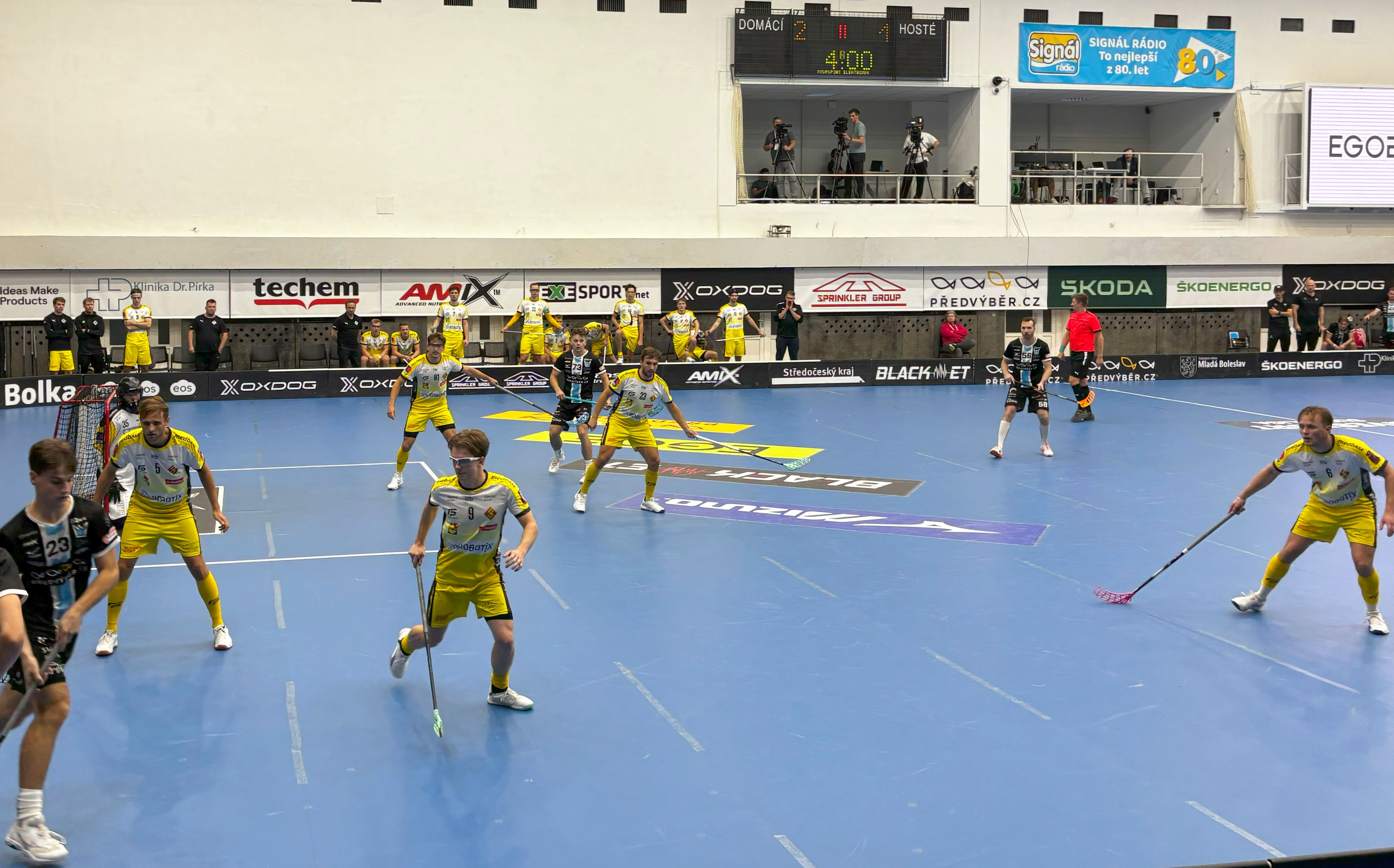
Men's team (in yellow) in 2026 Champions Cup quarterfinal match

=== Champions Cup ===
Tournament	Rank	Note
2026 Champions Cup	—	Quarterfinal loss to (Czech Republic) Florbal MB

== Women's Team ==
=== European Cup ===
Tournament	Rank	Note
1993 European Cup	2nd	Runner-up – lost to (Sweden) VK Rasket in final
1994 European Cup	3rd	Won 3rd place match against (Norway) IK Akerselva
1995 European Cup	3rd	Won 3rd place match against (Norway) Tunet IBK
1996 European Cup	3rd	Won 3rd place match against (Finland) Tapanilan Erä
1997 European Cup	2nd	Runner-up – lost to (Sweden) Högdalens AIS in final
1998 European Cup	4th	Lost 3rd place match to (Norway) IK Akerselva
1999 European Cup	2nd	Runner-up – lost to (Finland) Tapanilan Erä in final
