= Genocide (disambiguation) =

Genocide is the intentional destruction of an ethnic, national, racial, or religious group.

For list of genocides, see List of genocides

Genocide may also refer to:

== Film and television ==
- Genocide (1968 film), a Japanese film
- Genocide (1981 film), an American documentary
- "Genocide" (The World at War), a 1974 TV episode
- "Genocide" (The Shield), a 2008 TV episode

== Gaming ==
- Genocide (1989 video game), by Zoom
- Genocide (MUD), a 1992 text-based online game
- Genocide route, a route in Undertale

== Literature ==
- Genocide (novel), a 1997 Doctor Who novel by Paul Leonard
- The Genocides, a 1965 novel by Thomas M. Disch
- Genocide: Its Political Use in the Twentieth Century, a 1981 book by Leo Kuper

== Music ==
- Genocide (band), later called Repulsion
- Genocide (album), by Judas Priest, 2000
- Genocide, a 2005 EP by Upon a Burning Body
- "Genocide", a 2003 song by Deathstars from the album Synthetic Generation
- "Genocide", a 2015 song by Dr. Dre from the album Compton
- "Genocide", a 2006 song by Hammerfall from the album Threshold
- "Genocide", a 1976 song by Judas Priest from the album Sad Wings of Destiny
- "Genocide", a 1994 song by The Offspring from the album Smash
- "Genocide", a 2003 song by Psyclon Nine from the album Divine Infekt
- "Genocide", a 2009 song by Suicide Silence from the album No Time to Bleed
- "Genocide (The Killing of the Buffalo)", a 1980 song by Thin Lizzy from the album Chinatown

== Other uses ==
- Genocide (comics), a fictional character

== See also ==
- Gendercide, the systematic killing of members of a specific sex
- Genocide definitions
- Genocides in history
- List of genocides
- Genocide Convention, the Convention on the Prevention and Punishment of the Crime of Genocide
- Toko Fukawa, a manga character known as Genocide Jill and Genocide Jack
- Genocider Mode, a 2015 Japanese manga series
- Genocide Organ, a German power electronics collective
