= The Prevention of Genocide =

1985 book by Leo Kuper

- Author: Leo Kuper
- Published: 1985 by Yale University Press
- ISBN: 9780300034189
- OCLC: 12053175
- Website: Internet Archive

The Prevention of Genocide is a book by the sociologist Leo Kuper, about genocide. It is included on reading lists for related courses of study at several universities, and has been summarised in later texts on genocide, making it a notable work. According to Google Scholar, The Prevention of Genocide has been cited 186 times, as of December 2016.
