= Adam Kuper =

South African social anthropologist

Adam Kuper FBA MAE
- Born: Adam Jonathan Kuper; 29 December 1941 (age 84); Johannesburg, Union of South Africa
- Education: Parktown Boys' High School
- Alma mater: University of the Witwatersrand (BA); University of Cambridge (PhD)
- Spouse: Jessica Sue Cohen (m. 1966–2013)
- Children: Simon Kuper, Jeremy Kuper, Hannah Kuper
- Awards: Huxley Memorial Medal and Lecture
- Scientific career
- Fields: Anthropologist
- Institutions: Makerere University; London School of Economics; Brunel University; Leiden University; University College London
- Thesis: Kinship and politics in a Kgalagari village (1966)
- Website: www.lse.ac.uk/people/adam-kuper

Adam Jonathan Kuper (born 29 December 1941) FBA MAE is a British social anthropologist.

== Education and early life ==
Kuper was born in Johannesburg, and educated at Parktown Boys' High School. He was awarded a Bachelors of Arts degree in 1961 from the University of the Witwatersrand followed by PhD from the University of Cambridge, for research based in villages in the Kalahari Desert, Botswana. He was a postgraduate student at King's College, Cambridge.

== Career and research ==
After graduation Kuper did field studies in Botswana, and Jamaica, and taught at Universities in Uganda, Britain, Holland, Sweden and the United States.

Kuper taught from 1967 to 1970 at Makerere University in Kampala. From 1970 to 1976 he taught at University College London. From 1976 to 1985 he was professor of African anthropology at Leiden University in the Netherlands. From 1985 to 2008 he was a professor at Brunel University, where he was the first head of the Department of Human Sciences, and latterly head of the Anthropology Department. Kuper served as the first president of the European Association of Social Anthropology. He was a visiting professor at Boston University, 2011–14, and a Centennial Professor, London School of Economics, from 2013-14 where he still holds a visiting appointment.

In the early 1970s Kuper did fieldwork in Jamaica, on attachment to the National Planning Agency in the Office of the Prime Minister. However his main ethnographic focus continued to be the societies of Southern Africa, on which he has published several books. In 1973 he published a history of British social anthropology, and since then he has continued to study and publish on the intellectual history of anthropology, including critical studies on the idea of primitive society and of culture, and on the development of museums of anthropology. He was awarded a Leverhulme Trust major research grant for two years (2003-5) which allowed him to spend more time on research. The topic was cousin marriage and incest in nineteenth century England.

Kuper has supervised many PhD students on Southern African ethnography, history of anthropology, family business, and kinship.

=== Selected publications ===
- Wives for Cattle: Bridewealth and Marriage in Southern Africa
- The Invention of primitive society: Transformations of an Illusion
- The Chosen Primate: Human Nature and Cultural Diversity
- Anthropology and Anthropologists: The Modern British School
- The Social Science Encyclopaedia
- Culture: The Anthropologists' Account
- Incest and Influence: The Private Life of Bourgeois England
- The Museum of Other People. From Colonial Acquisitions to Cosmopolitan Exhibitions

=== Awards and honours ===
Kuper was elected a Fellow of the British Academy (FBA) in 2000 and a Member of the Academia Europaea (MAE).

In 2000 and in 2007 he was, respectively, awarded the Rivers Memorial Medal and the Huxley Memorial Medal of the Royal Anthropological Institute.

=== Retirement dispute ===
In January 2009 it was revealed that Brunel had reneged on an agreement to let him stay until 2010. Instead, he was forcibly retired in late 2008, just after the census date for publications submitted to the Research Assessment Exercise (RAE) had passed. Kuper responded by suing the university for breach of contract. In 2011, employment laws were changed to permit phased retirements past the age of 65. This was because of changes to the 2006 Employment (Age) Regulations making mandatory retirement imposed by the employer unlawful.

== Personal life ==
Kuper has lived in Muswell Hill for over 40 years.

Kuper married Jessica Sue Cohen (1944-2013) of Johannesburg in 1966 and had three children including Simon Kuper.

Kuper was the son of Simon Meyer Kuper and Gertrude Hesselson. The sociologist Leo Kuper and anthropologist Hilda Kuper were his uncle and aunt.
