= Grasshopper Club Zürich (floorball) =

Swiss floorball club

- Founded: 2002
- League: Unihockey Prime League
- Championships: Unihockey Prime League (2015–16 and 2021–22)

The Grasshopper Club Zürich (abbreviated GC Unihockey) is a floorball department of the eponymous sports club from Zurich, Switzerland. The department was formed in 2002 by the merger of several smaller teams.

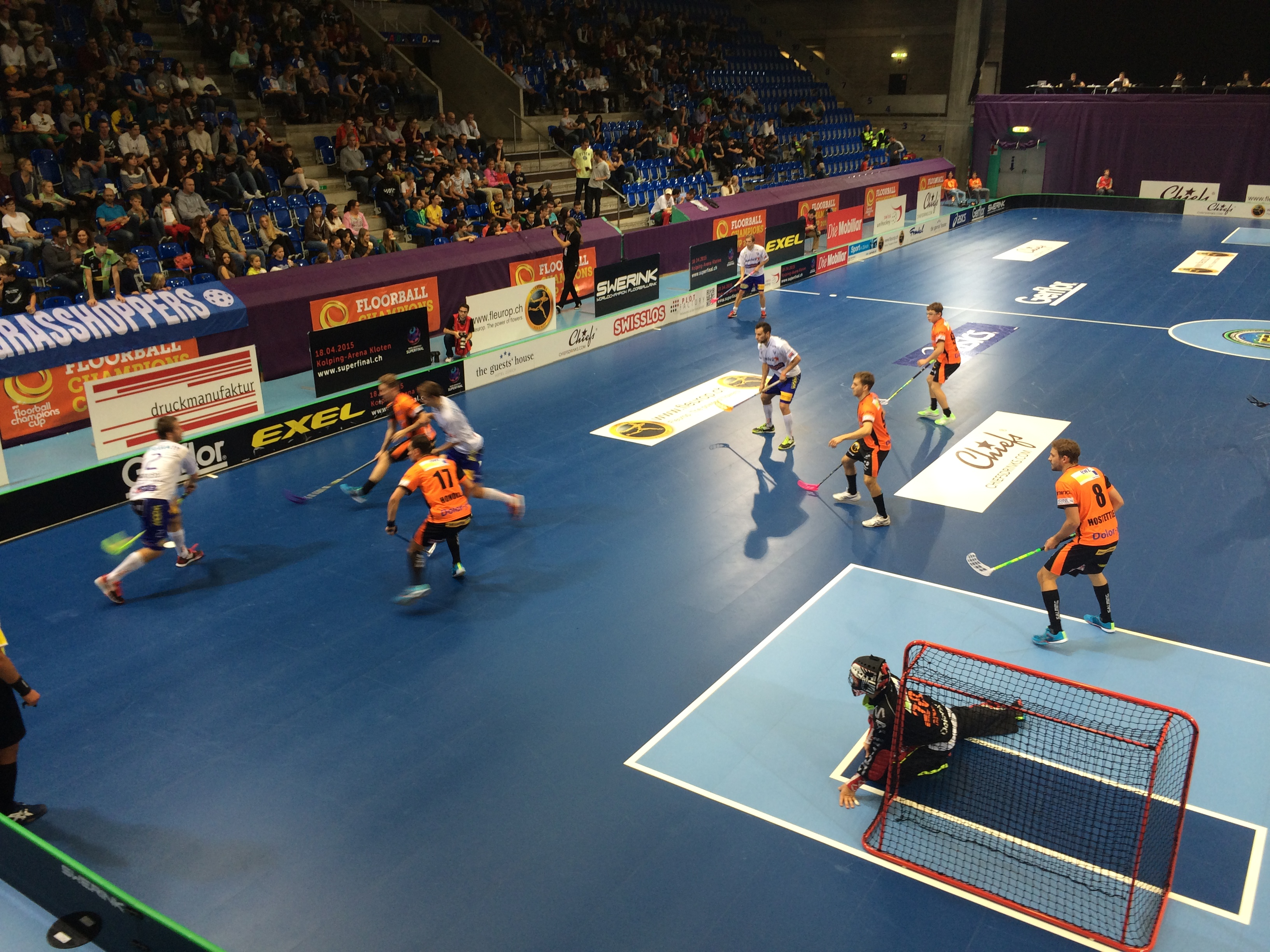
Grasshopper Club Zurich (in orange) in the match against 1. SC Vítkovice in the Champions Cup 2014

The men's team has been playing in the top Swiss competition, the Unihockey Prime League, since the team's inception, winning two championships in the 2015–16 and 2021–22 seasons. They also won the Swiss Cup four times in 2011, 2014, 2017 and 2022.

The now defunct women's team also played in the top competition after the club was founded.

== Men's team recent seasons ==
Season	Rank	Note
2020–21	3rd	Semifinal loss to SV Wiler-Ersigen
2021–22	1st	Champions – defeated SV Wiler-Ersigen in final
2022–23	3rd	Semifinal loss to SV Wiler-Ersigen
2023–24	3rd	Semifinal loss to Zug United
2024–25	4th	Semifinal loss to Zug United
