= United Hebrew Congregation =

United Hebrew Congregation may refer to:

== England ==
- Blackpool United Hebrew Congregation, a former Orthodox Jewish congregation and synagogue until 2012
- United Hebrew Congregation in the former Leazes Park Synagogue, Newcastle-upon-Tyne, until 1978
- United Hebrew Congregation in Torquay, until 2000

== Other places ==
- United Hebrew Congregation, in Singapore, a Reform Jewish community formed in 1993
- United Hebrew Congregation, in Johannesburg, South Africa, later the Oxford Shul
- United Hebrew Congregation (Chesterfield, Missouri), United States, a Reform Jewish synagogue

== See also ==
- United Synagogue, an umbrella body for Orthodox Judaism in Britain
