= Uch (disambiguation) =

Uch may refer to:

- Uch or Uch Sharif, located 75 km from Bahawalpur in Punjab province, Pakistan
- Uch Drag, village in Badakhshan Province in north-eastern Afghanistan
- Uch-Kul', town in the Osh Province of Kyrgyzstan
- Uch-Korgon, Kyrgyzstan, village in the Batken Province of Kyrgyzstan
- Uch-Kurgansk Hydro Power Plant, active hydro power project in Uch-Kurgansk, Kyrgyzstan
- Uch Tepa, city district of Tashkent, Uzbekistan
- Uch-Tyube, village in the Osh Province of Kyrgyzstan

== See also ==
- UCH (disambiguation), initials
