= Dawn Chatty =

Social anthropologist and academic

Dawn Chatty FBA
- Born: October 16, 1947 (age 78); New York City, United States
- Title: Emerita Professor of Anthropology and Forced Migration
- Spouse: Oliver Nicholas Patrick Mylne (m. 1979)
- Children: Two

Academic background
- Education: Wakefield High School
- Alma mater: University of California, Los Angeles; International Institute of Social Studies, Erasmus University Rotterdam
- Doctoral advisor: Hilda Kuper

Academic work
- Discipline: Social anthropology
- Sub-discipline: Middle East; nomadic pastoral tribes; refugees; Forced migration

Dawn Chatty, FBA (born October 16, 1947) is an American Emerita professor of anthropology and forced migration, who specialises in the Middle East, nomadic pastoral tribes, and refugees. From 2010 to 2015, she was a professor of anthropology and forced migration at the University of Oxford and from 2011 to 2014, director of the Refugee Studies Centre.

== Early life and education ==
Chatty was born on October 16, 1947, in New York City, United States, to Diaeddine Chatty and Eleonora Swanson (née Dorfman). She was educated at Wakefield High School in Arlington County, Virginia, and was a member of the class of 1965. She studied anthropology at the University of California, Los Angeles (UCLA), and graduated with a Bachelor of Arts (BA) honours degree. She then studied social development at the International Institute of Social Studies in the Netherlands, from which she graduated with a Master of Arts (MA) degree. Having returned to UCLA, she studied for a doctorate in social anthropology under Hilda Kuper.

== Academic career ==
Chatty is both an academic and practising anthropologist. She has held appointments at universities and at humanitarian organisations. This reflects her research interests, those being the Middle East, nomadic pastoral tribes, and refugees, particularly young refugees.

From 1977 to 1979, Chatty was a Fulbright professor at the University of Damascus in Syria. She then worked for the United Nations Development Programme as a technical assistance expert and was based in Oman between 1979 and 1988. She then returned to academia and became an associate professor at Sultan Qaboos University in Oman from 1988 to 1994.

In 1994, Chatty joined the University of Oxford, where she spent the rest of academic career until retirement. From 1994 to 2002, she was the Dulverton Senior Fellow at the Queen Elizabeth House (now the Department of International Development). In 2002, she was appointed university lecturer in forced migration and elected a Fellow of St Cross College, Oxford. In September 2004, she was promoted to a Reader in forced migration. From October 2005 to September 2007, she held a Leverhulme Trust Major Research Fellowship; the research she conducted during this period was published as Dispossession and Displacement in the Modern Middle East (2010). Between 2011 and 2014, she was Director of the Refugee Studies Centre at the University of Oxford. In January 2012, she was awarded a Title of Distinction as Professor of Anthropology and Forced Migration.

In 2015, Chatty retired from full-time academia and was appointed an Emerita Fellow of St Cross College and an Emerita Professor of the University of Oxford. She is a visiting professor of anthropology at New York University's Abu Dhabi campus.

Chatty's 2018 book Syria: The Making and Unmaking of a Refuge State, an overview of 150 years of forced migration into and out of Syria for the general public was criticized in one review for containing errors of fact and of omission, in particular, in discussion the multiple causes of the Syrian Civil War, Chatty omits any discussion of the Syrian government's longstanding support of multiple Palestinian militant organizations, and omits discussion of the destruction and depopulation of Syria's Yarmouk Camp, which contained 110,000 people, most of them descendants of Palestinian refugees, at the beginning of the war.

== Personal life ==
In 1979, Chatty married Oliver Nicholas Patrick Mylne. Together they have two children: one son and one daughter.

== Honours ==
In 2015, Chatty was elected a Fellow of the British Academy (FBA), the United Kingdom's national academy for the humanities and the social sciences.

== Selected works ==
- Chatty, Dawn (1986). From camel to truck: the Bedouin in the modern world (1st ed.). New York: Vantage Press. ISBN 978-0533064847.
- Chatty, Dawn (1996). Mobile Pastoralists: Development Planning and Social Change in Oman. New York: Columbia University Press. ISBN 978-0231105484.
- Chatty, Dawn; Colchester, Marcus, eds. (2002). Conservation and Mobile Indigenous Peoples: Displacement, Forced Settlement and Sustainable Development. New York: Berghahn books. ISBN 978-1571818416.
- Chatty, Dawn; Lewando-Hundt, Gillian, eds. (2005). Children of Palestine: Experiencing Forced Migration in the Middle East. New York: Berghahn Books. ISBN 978-1845450106.
- Chatty, Dawn (2010). Displacement and Dispossession in the Modern Middle East. New York: Cambridge University Press. ISBN 978-0521817929.
- Chatty, Dawn (2013). From camel to truck: the Bedouin in the modern world (2nd ed.). White Horse Press. ISBN 978-1874267720.
- Chatty, Dawn (2018). Syria: the making and unmaking of a refuge state. London: C. Hurst & Co. ISBN 978-1849048767.
