= Zug United =

Floorball club in Zug, Switzerland

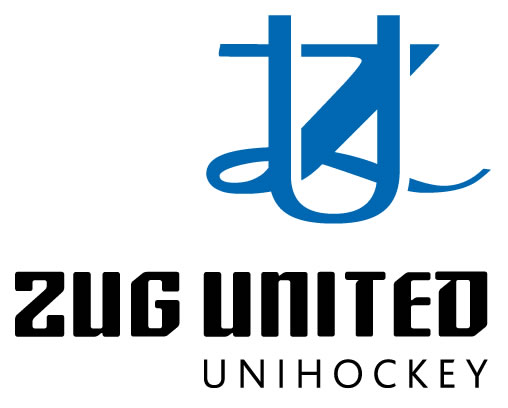
- Founded: 2004
- League: Women: Unihockey Prime League; Men: Unihockey Prime League
- Championships: Men: Unihockey Prime League (2024, 2025)

Zug United is a floorball club based in Zug, Switzerland. The club was founded in 2004 through the collaboration of the teams UHC Einhorn Hünenberg, UHC Astros Rotkreuz, UHC Zugerland, UHC White Indians Baar-Inwil and UHC Zuger Highlands from the canton of Zug.

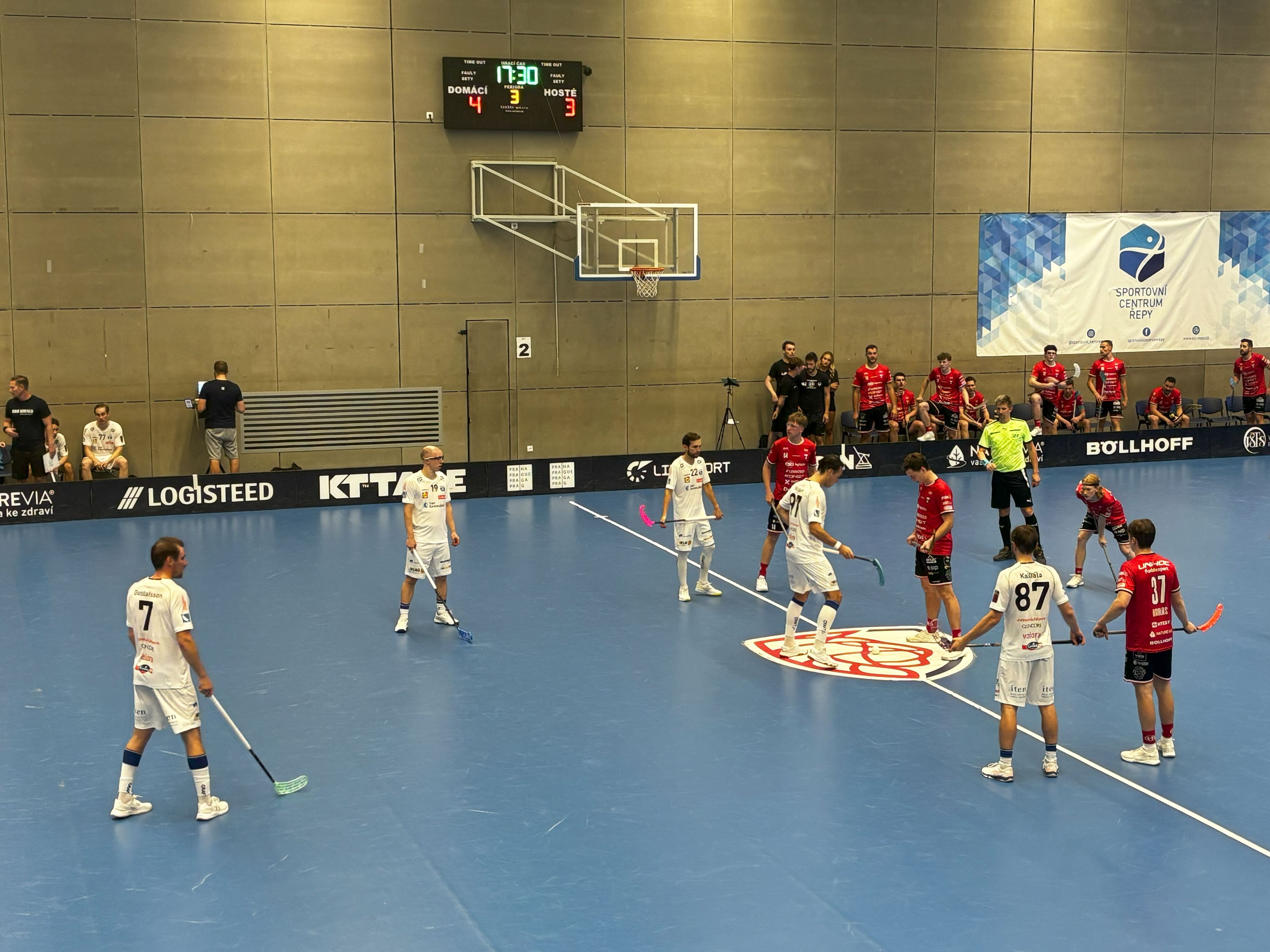
The men's team (in white) during the quarter-final of the 2026 Champions Cup against Tatran Střešovice

The men's team competes in the Unihockey Prime League, the highest Swiss floorball league. They first advanced to the league for the 2011–12 season but failed to remain in the competition. They returned to the league permanently in 2017. In 2020, the team won the Swiss Cup. During the 2023–24 season, they claimed their first league championship title (as well as winning the cup again). They also defended the league title in the 2024–25 season, in which they also won the Supercup.

The women's team also competes in the top league, continuing the legacy of its predecessor, UHC Zuger Highlands. In the 2023–24 season, the team achieved the title of league runner-up and claimed victory in the Supercup (and won gold in the Swiss Cup a year earlier). They also defended the runner-up title in the 2024–25 season. The team also holds three additional Swiss Cup titles from 2003 (as UHC Zuger Highlands), 2007, and 2014.

== Men's team ==
=== Recent seasons ===
Season	Rank	Note
2020–21	5th	Quarterfinal loss to SV Wiler-Ersigen
2021–22	4th	Semifinal loss to Grasshopper Club Zürich
2022–23	7th	Quarterfinal loss to HC Rychenberg Winterthur
2023–24	1st	Champions – defeated SV Wiler-Ersigen in final
2024–25	1st	Champions – defeated Tigers Langnau in final

=== Known players ===
- Justus Kainulainen (2025–)

== Women's team ==
=== Recent seasons ===
Season	Rank	Note
2020–21	6th	Quarterfinal loss to Wizards Bern-Burgdorf
2021–22	7th	Quarterfinal loss to Skorpion Emmental Zollbrück
2022–23	3rd	Semifinal loss to Kloten-Dietlikon Jets
2023–24	2nd	Runner-up – lost to Kloten-Dietlikon Jets in final
2024–25	2nd	Runner-up – lost to Kloten-Dietlikon Jets in final
