= HUC =

Huc or HUC may refer to:

- Évariste Régis Huc (1813–1860), French Roman Catholic missionary in China, Tartary and Tibet
- Hebrew Union College, the oldest extant Jewish seminary in the Americas
- Honker Union, a hacker group in China
- Hospitais da Universidade de Coimbra, a university hospital in Coimbra, Portugal
- Hydrologic unit code, a hydrological code used by the United States Geological Survey
- Huc, a village in Todirești, Vaslui, Romania
- Highly urbanized city, a legal class of cities in the Philippines
- Huc, a hydrogenase in bacteria
