= CUH =

CUH may refer to:

== Healthcare ==
- Cambridge University Hospitals NHS Foundation Trust, United Kingdom
- Cork University Hospital, Ireland
- Croydon University Hospital, London, England

== Other ==
- Computable universe hypothesis, a "theory of everything" proposed by Swedish-American physicist Max Tegmark
- Copper hydride (CuH), a highly unstable compound
- "Cuh", a song on John Fruscianti's 2017 album Trickfinger II
- A slang term for the Edgar cut hairstyle
- A slang term for cousin
- Chuka dialect of the Meru language, a Bantu language of Kenya (ISO 639-3 code: cuh)
