= Lidl Unihockey Prime League (men's floorball) =

Highest league in Swiss floorball

- Sport: Floorball
- Founded: 1983; 43 years ago
- No. of teams: 12
- Country: Switzerland
- Confederation: Swiss Unihockey
- Most recent champion: HC Rychenberg Winterthur (2026, 1st title)
- Most titles: SV Wiler-Ersigen (13 titles, last in 2023)
- Level on pyramid: Level 1
- Relegation to: National League B
- Domestic cup: Swiss Cup
- International cup: Champions Cup
- Website: unihockey.swiss

Unihockey Prime League Men (also known as Lidl Unihockey Prime League Men due to sponsorship, abbreviated as L-UPL Men) is the top men's floorball league in Switzerland. The league consists of 12 teams. It was first played in the 1983–84 season.

The champion of the league is eligible to compete at the Champions Cup. The lower league is National League B.

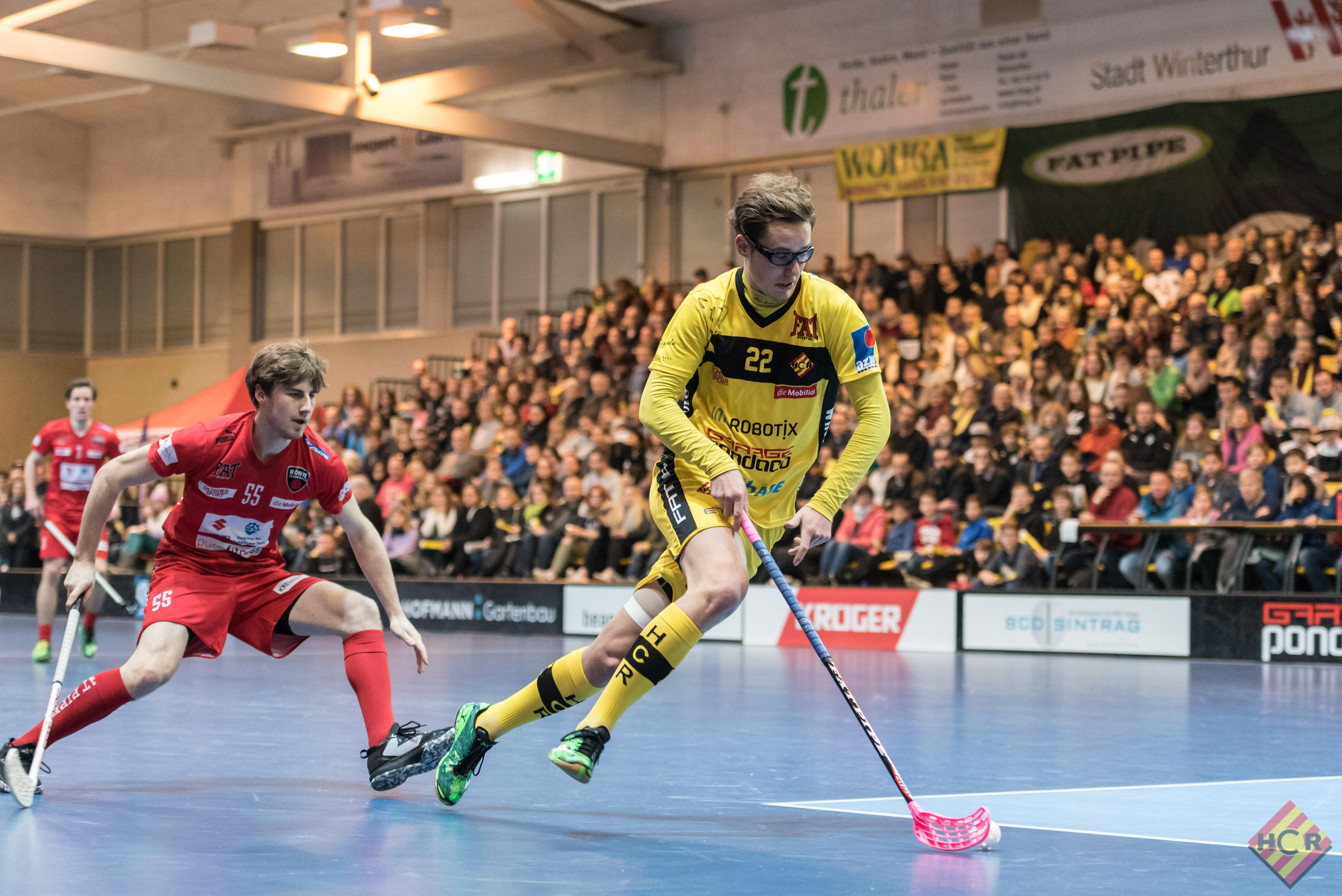
HC Rychenberg Winterthur vs. Floorball Köniz match in 2016–17 season

The most successful team in the league, with 13 titles, the most recent in 2023, is SV Wiler-Ersigen. In the last 2025–26 season, the team HC Rychenberg Winterthur won the championship for the first time.

== History ==
Since its founding, the league was known as National League A (NLA). Between the 2007–08 and 2012–13 seasons, it was renamed Swiss Mobiliar League (SML) due to sponsorship, before reverting to NLA. The league adopted its current name in the 2022–23 season following a new sponsorship agreement.

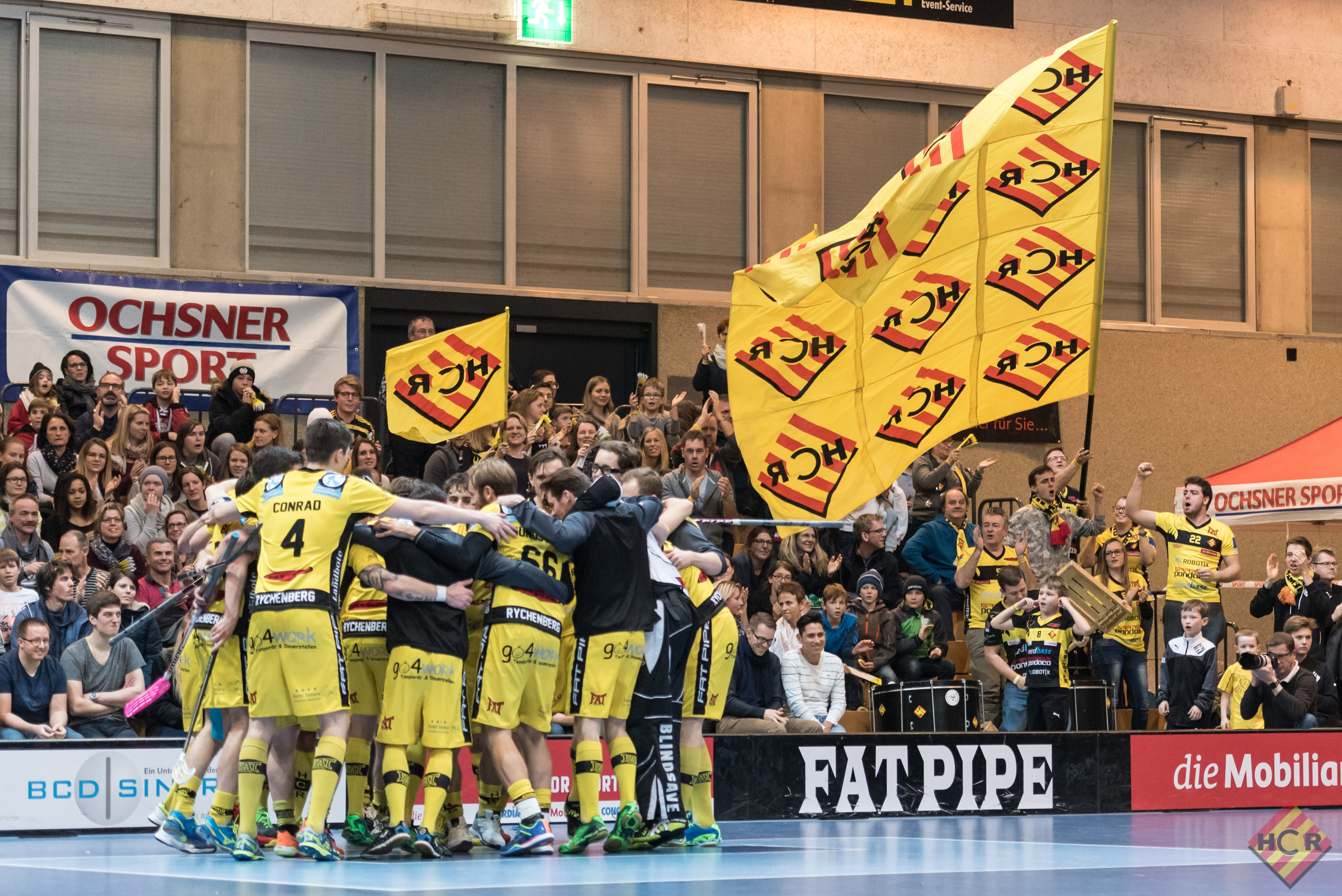
Players and fans of HC Rychenberg Winterthur in 2017

The Superfinal, a single match deciding the championship title, was introduced in 2015.

== Competition format ==
In the regular season, taking place approximately from September to March, all teams play each other twice, resulting in a total of 22 rounds. Teams earn 3 points for a win, 2 points for an overtime win, and 1 point for an overtime loss.

At the end of the regular season, the top eight teams advance to the playoff, which starts usually in March and culminates in April. The top three teams get to choose their opponents from the bottom four in the quarterfinals. Semifinal matchups are determined based on regular season standings. The quarterfinals and semifinals are played in a best-of-seven format. The final consists of a single match, held alongside the women's league final as part of the Superfinal event. The league champion qualifies for the Champions Cup. If the same team wins both the league and the Swiss Cup, the league runner-up also qualifies. The finalists of both competitions face off in the Supercup.

The bottom four teams of the regular season (11th to 14th place) compete in a play-out (consisting of two best-of-seven rounds) to determine which team is relegated directly to the National League B (NLB). The team that loses the second round of the play-out is replaced by the NLB champion. The defeated NLB finalist then competes in a promotion/relegation series against the winner of the second round of the Super League play-out, which is also played as a best-of-seven series.

== Current teams ==
Location of Unihockey Prime League Men teams

Teams in 2025–26 season:

- Floorball Chur United
- Floorball Köniz Bern (Bern)
- Floorball Thurgau (Weinfelden)
- Grasshopper Club Zürich
- HC Rychenberg Winterthur (Winterthur)
- SV Wiler-Ersigen
- Tigers Langnau (Zäziwil)
- UHC Alligator Malans (Malans)
- UHC Uster
- Unihockey Basel Regio (Oberwil and Basel)
- WASA St. Gallen
- Zug United

== Previous finalists ==
Finalists in past seasons:

Season	Champions	Runner-up
1984	UHC Urdorf	
1985	UHT Zäziwil	
1986	UHC Giants-Kloten	
1987	UHT Zäziwil	
1988	UHT Zäziwil	
1989	UHC Rot-Weiss Chur	UHC Elch Zürich
1990	UHC Rot-Weiss Chur	
1991	UHC Rot-Weiss Chur	
1992	UHC Rot-Weiss Chur	HC Rychenberg Winterthur
1993	UHC Rot-Weiss Chur	HC Rychenberg Winterthur
1994	UHC Rot-Weiss Chur	UHC Alligator Malans
1995	UHC Rot-Weiss Chur	
1996	UHC Rot-Weiss Chur	Torpedo Chur
1997	UHC Alligator Malans	UHC Rot-Weiss Chur
1998	UHC Rot-Weiss Chur	UHC Alligator Malans
1999	UHC Alligator Malans	UHC Rot-Weiss Chur
2000	UHC Rot-Weiss Chur	UHC Alligator Malans
2001	UHC Rot-Weiss Chur	UHC Alligator Malans
2002	UHC Alligator Malans	SV Wiler-Ersigen
2003	UHC Rot-Weiss Chur	SV Wiler-Ersigen
2004	SV Wiler-Ersigen	UHC Alligator Malans
2005	SV Wiler-Ersigen	Grasshopper Club Zürich
2006	UHC Alligator Malans	SV Wiler-Ersigen
2007	SV Wiler-Ersigen	Unihockey Tigers Langnau
2008	SV Wiler-Ersigen	Floorball Köniz
2009	SV Wiler-Ersigen	Unihockey Tigers Langnau
2010	SV Wiler-Ersigen	HC Rychenberg Winterthur
2011	SV Wiler-Ersigen	UHC Alligator Malans
2012	SV Wiler-Ersigen	Grasshopper Club Zürich
2013	UHC Alligator Malans	Floorball Köniz
2014	SV Wiler-Ersigen	Unihockey Tigers Langnau
2015	SV Wiler-Ersigen	UHC Alligator Malans
2016	Grasshopper Club Zürich	Floorball Köniz
2017	SV Wiler-Ersigen	UHC Alligator Malans
2018	Floorball Köniz	SV Wiler-Ersigen
2019	SV Wiler-Ersigen	Grasshopper Club Zürich
2020	The season was cancelled	
2021	Floorball Köniz	SV Wiler-Ersigen
2022	Grasshopper Club Zürich	SV Wiler-Ersigen
2023	SV Wiler-Ersigen	Floorball Köniz
2024	Zug United	SV Wiler-Ersigen
2025	Zug United	Unihockey Tigers Langnau
2026	HC Rychenberg Winterthur	Zug United
