= UCH =

UCH may refer to:

- Chien Hsin University of Science and Technology in Taoyuan, Taiwan
- Underwater Cultural Heritage, refer to Underwater Cultural Heritage Act 2018
- Ultimate Chicken Horse, a video game by Canadian studio Clever Endeavour Games
- United Christian Hospital, a hospital in Kwun Tong, Hong Kong
- University of Canberra Hospital, a hospital in Canberra, Australia
- University College Hospital or University College London Hospital (UCLH)

== See also ==
- Uch (disambiguation)
