= SV Wiler-Ersigen =

Swiss floorball club

- Founded: 1984
- League: Unihockey Prime League
- Championships: Unihockey Prime League (13 titles: 2004, 2005, 2007–2012, 2015, 2017, 2019 and 2023); European Cup (2005)

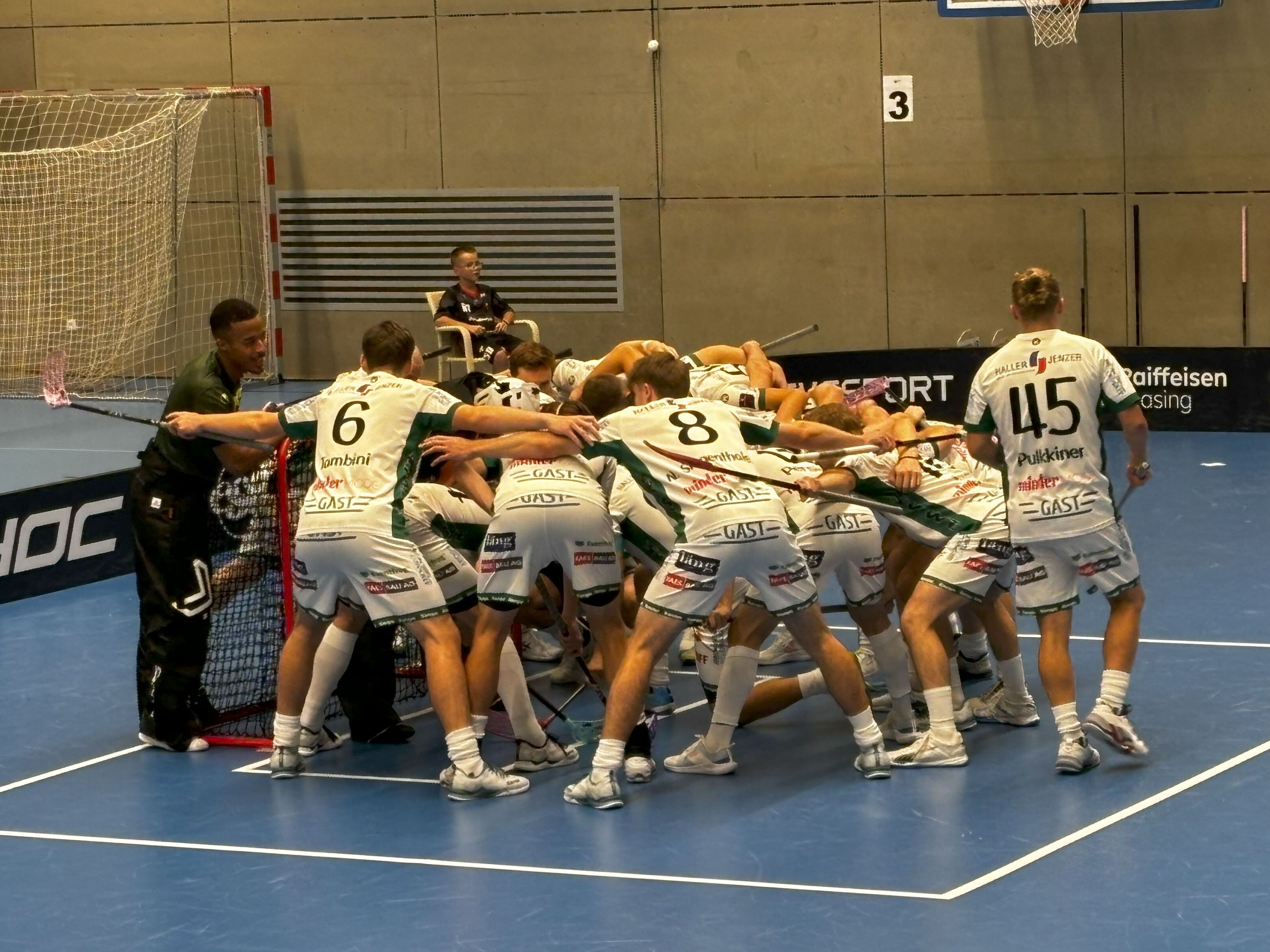
SV Wiler-Ersigen before 2024–25 Champions Cup semifinals against Tatran Střešovice

The SV Wiler-Ersigen (abbreviated SVWE) is a Swiss floorball club founded in 1984. It is based in Zuchwil, about 40 km north of Bern. The club is named after two nearby municipalities Wiler bei Utzenstorf and Ersigen, or rather their teams, which merged in 1989.

The men's team plays in Swiss highest floorball league, the Unihockey Prime League. It first entered the top competition, at the time the National League A, in 1988 as SV Wiler. Eight years later, in 1996, it was relegated to the second league for one season. Since then, the team has played the top competition continuously.

In 2004, Wiler won its first title. A season later they won not only the league again but also the Swiss Cup. In addition, in the same year, the team became the first (and as of 2025 still the only) Swiss and only the second non-Swedish team to win the European Cup (today's Champions Cup). In the following years, Wiler won the league eleven more times, the last time in the 2022–23 season. With a total of 13 titles and 20 appearances in finals, it is the most successful team in the top Swiss competition. The team has also won the Swiss Super Cup five times, most recently in 2024.

== Men's team ==
=== Recent seasons ===
Season	Rank	Note
2020–21	2nd	Runner-up – lost to Floorball Köniz in final
2021–22	2nd	Runner-up – lost to Grasshopper Club Zürich in final
2022–23	1st	Champions – defeated Floorball Köniz in final
2023–24	2nd	Runner-up – lost to Zug United in final
2024–25	5th	Quarterfinal loss to Grasshopper Club Zürich

=== Known players ===
- Alexander Galante Carlström (2025–)
- Matthias Hofbauer (1997–2002, 2003–2007, 2009–2020)
