= Slevik IBK =

Norwegian floorball club

Slevik Innebandyklubb (founded 20 February 1989) is a floorball club from Onsøy in Fredrikstad, Norway.

== History ==
Slevik IBK is the oldest floorball club. It was started in 1988 by a group of friends, but the official foundation was set in February 20, 1989. The first training was held on Slevik primary school, but it soon became too small compared to the number of athletes, so when the club moved to Gaustad Hall at Manstad. Where the club has lived up to it was built a new hall on Hurrød School in Pomeroy.

Club colors have also changed over time, and because of a small accident when an order was the first color pink. Actually, it was ordered red hockey jerseys from Canada, but instead were sent pink. This was received with a smile and leaving the color set. Then changed the color to yellow in 1995 to be in line to school color to Slevik primary before it was again changed to black in 2002.

Slevik has a long track record, and on 21 April 2012 could the club book it's none less than 20 NM title, when Sveiva beaten 4-1 in the championship final of the junior class for women. The 25th NM-gold was won by the men's team in 2014, the same year as Slevik turns 25.

Slevik men's team was the first club to win "the double" 3 years in a row.

Slevik IBK also organizes Norway's two biggest floorball tournament in Fredrikstad, a tournament that bears the name Plankecup. It is held every year in September and it happens in Kongstenhallen. TV Bodencup is the club's second tournament, one cup for youth teams. It is held each season in May.

== Merits ==
- NM gold men's senior: 1997, 2000, 2012, 2013, 2014, 2015, 2023 and 2025
- NM gold women's senior: 2004 & 2014
- NM gold junior men:2008
- NM gold junior women: 1999, 2002, 2005, 2006, 2009, 2010, & 2012
- NM gold boys: 1996, 1999, 2004, 2005 & 2014
- NM gold girls: 2001, 2004, 2005, 2006 & 2010
- League champions men senior 2011-2012, 2012–2013, 2013–2014 & 2014-2015 (Eliteserien)
- Men won in 2012 silver medal in Euro Floorball Cup
- Men won Euro Floorball Cup at home 2014
- The club has in different classes a total of 35 circuit championships.
