= UHC Zugerland =

Swiss floorball club

UHC Zugerland is a Swiss floorball club from the canton of Zug. The club is part of Zug United collaboration.

== Stadium ==
The team plays in the sports hall Röhrliberg in Cham.
