= Simon Meyer Kuper =

South African judge (1906–1963)

Mr. Justice Simon Meyer Kuper KC

Justice of the South African Supreme Court
- In office 1955–1963

Personal details
- Born: Johannesburg, South Africa
- Died: 20 March 1963
- Children: Adam Kuper
- Education: University of the Witwatersrand
- Occupation: Lawyer, Judge

Simon Meyer Kuper (1906 – 20 March 1963) was a judge of the South African Supreme Court, and a noted leader in the South African Jewish community. His children include anthropologist Adam Kuper.

== Early life ==
Kuper was born in Johannesburg in 1906. He attended Jeppe High School and subsequently gained his B.A. and LL.B. at the University of the Witwatersrand.

== Career ==
Kuper was admitted to the Bar in 1927. He joined Group 621 of the Johannesburg Bar. After practising law for several years, he was appointed King's Counsel in 1946 and became a judge at the South African Supreme Court in 1955.

The South African Supreme Court consisted of several divisions. Kuper sat in the Transvaal Provincial Division, which covered Pretoria, South Africa's administrative capital.

== Civic activities ==
In 1946, Kuper provided evidence before the Anglo-American Commission of Inquiry on Palestine, on behalf of South African Jews.

At the February 1954 Conference on Jewish Material Claims Against Germany, Kuper represented South African Jews, together with Abel Shaban.

Kuper was chairman of the South African Jewish Board of Deputies from 1944–49, and was chairman of the South African Zionist Federation from 1950 to 1955. Kuper's resignation from the chairmanship of the latter, which was made to pursue his career at the Supreme Court, was honoured by a pledge to plant a grove of 1,000 trees in Israel. Kuper subsequently became honorary president of the South African Zionist Federation.

Kuper was at one time president of the United Hebrew Congregation, honorary vice-president of the Israel United Appeal, and honorary vice-president of the South African Jewish Appeal.

== Death ==
On the evening of 8 March 1963, Kuper, who was at home with his wife and daughter, was shot through a window by an unknown assailant. He died twelve days later.

Later that year, a hall at the Oxford Shul in Johannesburg, where Kuper had been a member of the congregation, was named in his memory. In November 1963, a new B'nai B'rith lodge, founded in Johannesburg, was named after Kuper.

Mr. Justice Ludorf said of Kuper:

Why a murderer should have taken for his prey this good man is incomprehensible. He was always to my mind the epitome of honesty. The work he did not like was in the criminal court. For all of us the task of punishing a man is very difficult. But he seemed to find the task even more difficult than the [other judges did]. He would discuss a case with his colleagues for hours to satisfy himself that the punishment he proposed to inflict was just and proper - and not too severe.
