= HCU =

HCU may refer to:

== Universities ==
- Heritage Christian University, in Florence, Alabama, United States
- Hiroshima City University, in Japan
- Houston Christian University, in Texas, United States
- Hsuan Chuang University, in Hsinchu City, Taiwan
- Huachiew Chalermprakiet University, in Samut Prakan, Thailand
- Hyderabad Central University, in India

== Other uses ==
- Heavy Conversion Unit, of the Royal Air Force
- Homocystinuria
- Hyundai Chungun High School, in Dong-gu, Ulsan, South Korea
- High Care Unit
- Hydraulic Control Unit
