= UHC Waldkirch-St. Gallen =

- Full name: UHC Waldkirch-St. Gallen
- Nickname(s): UHC WaSa
- Short name: UHC WaSa
- Founded: 1997
- Ground: Tal der Demut
- Capacity: 1500
- Chairman: Joe P. Stöckli
- Manager: Fabian Arvidsson
- League: National League A
- Website: http://www.uhcwasa.ch/en/

UHC Waldkirch-St.Gallen is a Swiss floorball team out of Waldkirch and St. Gallen, which plays in the highest Swiss league.

== History ==
The club was founded in 1997 through the fusion of the club UHC St.Gallen and the TSV Waldkirch. In the season 2002/03 WaSa were promoted to the national league A for the first time in the club's history. After two season the club out of the Eastern part of Switzerland were relegated to the league B.

Another two years later in 2007/08 they were promoted again. WaSa won the Best-of-five series against the last of the league a Club, Basel Magic, with 3:0. The last game of this series was attempted by more than a thousand visitors.

In 2017 the women team advanced to the highest Swiss league.

== Squad 2015/2016 ==
Pos	Nr	Name	Nationality
T	1	Ruven Gruber	Switzerland
T	39	Dominic Jud	Switzerland
V	15	Stefan Meier	Switzerland
V	21	Manuel Büsser	Switzerland
V	22	Moreno Sonderegger	Switzerland
V	23	Patrick Obrist	Switzerland
V	24	Andrin Flüeler	Switzerland
V	44	Thomas Mittelholzer	Switzerland
V	53	Markus Olavi Lajunen	Finland
V	99	Jeanot Eschbach	Switzerland
C	11	Louis Pfau	Switzerland
C	12	Dario Löhrer	Switzerland
C	13	Gustav Kroona	Sweden
S	14	Andrin Zellweger	Switzerland
S	5	Manuel Rüegg	Switzerland
S	10	Chris Eschbach	Switzerland
S	17	Sandro Büchel	Switzerland
S	19	Silas Lienert	Switzerland
S	20	Maurin Rüegg	Switzerland
S	27	Roman Mittelholzer	Switzerland
S	72	Riku Laaksonen	Finland
	Coaches		
HC		Fabian Arvidsson	Sweden
AC		Jérôme Baumann	Switzerland
AC		Benjamin Zöllig	Switzerland
GC		Kornelius Birrer	Switzerland
