= Hilda Kuper =

South African anthropologist

- Born: 23 August 1911; Bulawayo, Southern Rhodesia
- Died: 23 April 1992 (aged 80); Los Angeles, California, U.S.
- Spouse: Leo Kuper
- Awards: Rivers Memorial Medal (1961); Guggenheim Fellowship (1969)

Academic background
- Education: University of Witwatersrand; London School of Economics
- Thesis: An African Aristocracy: Rank among the Swazi; The Uniform of Colour: a Study of White–Black Relationships in Swaziland; (1947)
- Doctoral advisor: Bronisław Malinowski

Academic work
- Discipline: Social anthropology
- Institutions: University of California, Los Angeles
- Doctoral students: Dawn Chatty

Hilda Beemer Kuper (née Beemer; 23 August 1911 – 23 April 1992) was a social anthropologist most notable for her extensive work on Swazi culture. She started studying the Swazi culture and associating with the Swaziland's royal family after she was awarded with a grant by the International African Institute of London. She studied and illustrated Swazi traditions embodied in the political vision of King Sobhuza II, who later became a close friend. King Sobhuza II personally awarded Kuper with Swazi citizenship in 1970.

== Early life and education ==
Born to Lithuanian Jewish and Austrian Jewish parents in Bulawayo, Southern Rhodesia, Kuper moved to South Africa after the death of her father. She studied at the University of the Witwatersrand and, afterwards, at the London School of Economics under Malinowski.

== Doctoral fieldwork and anthropological career ==
In 1934, Kuper won a fellowship from the International African Institute to study in Swaziland. In July of that year, while at an education conference in Johannesburg, she met Sobhuza II, paramount chief and later king of Swaziland. With assistance from Sobhuza and Malinowski, Kuper moved to the royal village of Lobamba and was introduced to Sobhuza's mother, the queen mother Lomawa. Here Kuper learned siSwati and pursued her fieldwork. This phase of Kuper's researches into Swazi culture culminated in the two-part dissertation, An African Aristocracy: Rank among the Swazi (1947) and The Uniform of Colour: a Study of White–Black Relationships in Swaziland (1947).

In the early 1950s, Kuper moved to Durban. During that decade, she focused her studies on the Indian community in the Natal region, as summarised in Indian People in Natal (1960). In 1953, Kuper received a senior lectureship at the University of Natal in Durban. In addition to her academic work, together with her husband, Leo Kuper, she helped to found the Liberal Party in Natal. In the 1950s, she also wrote the play A Witch in My Heart, which was first published in an isiZulu translation in 1962, before the original English language text was published in 1970. She later described this play as the best ethnography she ever wrote.

In 1961, the Kupers moved to Los Angeles, to escape the harassment of liberals that was increasingly prevalent in apartheid South Africa, and to enable Leo to accept a professorship in sociology at UCLA. In 1963, Kuper published The Swazi: a South African Kingdom and was herself appointed professor of anthropology at UCLA. Kuper was a popular teacher, and in 1969, won a Guggenheim fellowship.

In 1978, Kuper published an extensive, official biography of Sobhuza II, King Sobhuza II, Ngwenyama and King of Swaziland.

== Awards ==
Award	Awarding body	Year
Rivers Memorial Medal	Royal Anthropological Institute	1961
Guggenheim Fellowship	John Simon Guggenheim Memorial Foundation	1969
Honorary doctorate	University of Swaziland	1990

== Personal life ==
Kuper married Leo Kuper in 1936. They had two daughters, Mary and Jenny. Her nephew, Adam Kuper, is also an anthropologist.

== Publications ==
- An African aristocracy: rank among the Swazi. Oxford University Press. 1947.
- The uniform of colour, a study of white-black relationships in Swaziland. 1947.
- African systems of kinship and marriage. 1950.
- The Shona and Ndebele of Southern Rhodesia. 1954.
- An Ethnographic Description of a Tamil-Hindu Marriage in Durban. 1956.
- An ethnographic description of Kavady, a Hindu ceremony in South Africa. 1959.
- Indian people in Natal. 1960.
- The Swazi: a South African kingdom. New York, Holt, Rinehart and Winston. 1963.
- African law: adaptation and development. 1965.
- Bite of Hunger: A Novel of Africa. 1965.
- Urbanization and migration in West Africa. 1965.
- A Witch in My Heart: A Play about the Swazi People. Oxford University Press for the International African Institute. 1970.
  - First published in 1962 as Inhliziyo Ngumthakathi, a translation into isiZulu by Trevor Cope
  - Published in 1978 as Inhlitiyo Ngumtsakatsi, a translation into siSwati by Thembi Mthembu and Zodwa Ginindza
- Sobhuza II, Ngwenyama and King of Swaziland: the story of an hereditary ruler and his country. 1970.
- South Africa: human rights and genocide. 1981.
