= Genocide: Its Political Use in the Twentieth Century =

1981 book by sociologist Leo Kuper

Genocide: Its political use in the Twentieth Century
- First edition
- Author: Leo Kuper
- Published: 1981 by Pelican Books; 1982 by Yale University Press
- ISBN: 9780300031201 1983 Yale University Press reprint
- Website: Yale University Press; Google Books

Genocide: Its political use in the Twentieth Century is a 1981 book by the sociologist Leo Kuper about genocide. The historical examples studied include the Armenian genocide, the Holocaust, the 1971 Bangladesh genocide, Ache in Paraguay, and Ikiza (the Burundian genocide of 1972).

== Overview ==
The book explores the phenomenon of genocide in the 20th century, delving into its origins, causes, and consequences.

Kuper argues that genocide is not merely the outcome of individual actions or insanity but is instead a calculated and systematic tactic employed by states or other influential entities to attain particular political objectives.

Kuper criticises the legal definition stated in the UN (Genocide) Convention. For example, the West wanted a provision labeling the destruction of political groups as genocide, but the Soviets blocked it; conversely, the Soviets wanted cultural genocide included, and the West blocked that. He also blames the many genocides of recent years on the failure of the United Nations and the major powers to enforce the UN (Genocide) Convention.

Kuper's analysis focuses on the political, economic, and social factors that have led to genocide, including nationalism, colonialism, racism, and social inequality. He also discusses the ways in which genocide has been used as a tool of political power and control, and how it has been legitimized and rationalized by those who perpetrate it. Professor of Law Daniel Turak reviewed the book and stated "Furthermore, the author explains the relationship of colonization, decolonization and successor states to genocide." He argues that some states have claimed sovereignty to attack rivals, while the UN and the Organization of African Unity are ineffective: "The author concludes that these organizations have condoned the crime by delay, evasion and subterfuge."

== Reception ==
It was reviewed in a number of periodicals, including The New York Times and the Virginia Quarterly Review.
