= Football Against the Enemy =

Book about soccer by Simon Kuper

Football Against the Enemy is a book by Simon Kuper. It won the 1994 William Hill Sports Book of the Year award. In the United States, it was released as Soccer Against the Enemy.

== In fiction ==
In Ted Lasso Season 2, Episode 6 "The Signal" Coach Beard is shown reading the book.
