= Oxford Shul =

Orthodox synagogue in Johannesburg, South Africa

- Location of the synagogue in Greater Johannesburg

Religion
- Affiliation: Orthodox Judaism
- Rite: Nusach Ashkenaz
- Ecclesiastical or organizational status: Synagogue
- Leadership: Rabbi Yossi Chaikin
- Status: Active

Location
- Location: 20 North Avenue, Riviera, Johannesburg, Gauteng
- Country: South Africa
- Interactive map of Oxford Shul
- Coordinates: 26°09′48″S 28°03′06″E

Architecture
- Architects: S. A. Abramowitch, Pinshow and Schneider
- Type: Synagogue architecture
- Established: 1943 (as a congregation)
- Completed: 1962
- Capacity: 1,500 worshippers

Website
- oxfordshul.com

The Oxford Shul is an Orthodox Jewish congregation and synagogue, located in Riviera, near the suburbs of Saxonwold, Houghton and Killarney, in Johannesburg, in the region of Gauteng, South Africa. The congregation was established in 1943 and moved into its current building in 1962. The sanctuary is one of the largest in the Southern Hemisphere, with seating for 1,500 congregants.

== History ==
The Oxford Synagogue was founded in 1943 and a 0.81-hectare (2-acre) site was purchased.

In 1944 the Oxford Synagogue joined the United Hebrew Congregation of South Africa as a third constituent synagogue. In 1945 the first High Festival Services were held in the large Tudor House, by then partly converted into a small synagogue accommodating 400 congregants. In November of the same year a dedication service was held with the Chief Rabbi Louis Isaac Rabinowitz officiating. The first rabbi was W. Yesorsky, who was succeeded in 1947 by J. Rozowski.

In 1949 building began on the hall, a synagogue accommodating 800 worshippers. In 1954 an extra 0.81 ha (2 acres) of land adjacent to the synagogue property and facing Riviera Road were purchased, and the present nursery school and the double-storey education block opened. The official opening of the synagogue took place in August 1962. In 1963 at a banquet the reconstructed hall was named “The Simon Kuper Hall” in honour of a member of the congregation.

In 1964 the architects, S. A. Abramowitch, Pinshow and Schneider, received an Award of Merit from the Transvaal Provincial Institute of Architects for the best ecclesiastical building erected in the Transvaal from 1954 to 1964. In 1965 the Menorah Primary School began as a branch of the Yeshiva College of South Africa. Many of the older members of the congregation lived in neighbouring Killarney, with several residing in the Art Deco building, Daventry Court, now a heritage landmark.

Over 2,000 people attended a memorial service at the synagogue in 2013 for former president, Nelson Mandela. Mandela's successor, Thabo Mbeki addressed the congregation.

== Clergy ==
Rabbi Nachman Bernhard of New York City, served the congregation for over three decades. The congregation approached Joseph B. Soloveitchik to recommend one of his students from Rabbi Isaac Elchanan Theological Seminary to lead the synagogue. Soloveitchik put forward the names of Rabbi Norman Lamm and Bernhard. The congregation chose to consider Bernhard as Lamm was unavailable due to his doctoral studies. Bernhard was uncertain about accepting the position and decided to pursue the opportunity following conversations with Rabbi Menachem Mendel Schneerson. Under his leadership, membership rose to over 2,000 families. He also became known for his anti-apartheid activism within the Jewish community, before his retirement in 2000.

Yossi Chaikin succeeded Bernhard as rabbi in 2000. Chaikin was born in Copenhagen, Denmark, and educated in Belgium and the United States. He moved to South Africa in 1986 to be the Director of Activities at Chabad House in Johannesburg. In 1988 he became leader of the Constantia Hebrew Congregation in the Cape Peninsula. He was also Vice-Principal and Head of Department of Jewish Studies at Herzlia Constantia Primary School (on whose campus the shul was located).

== See also ==
- History of the Jews in South Africa
- List of synagogues in South Africa
