= Simon Kuper =

British and French author

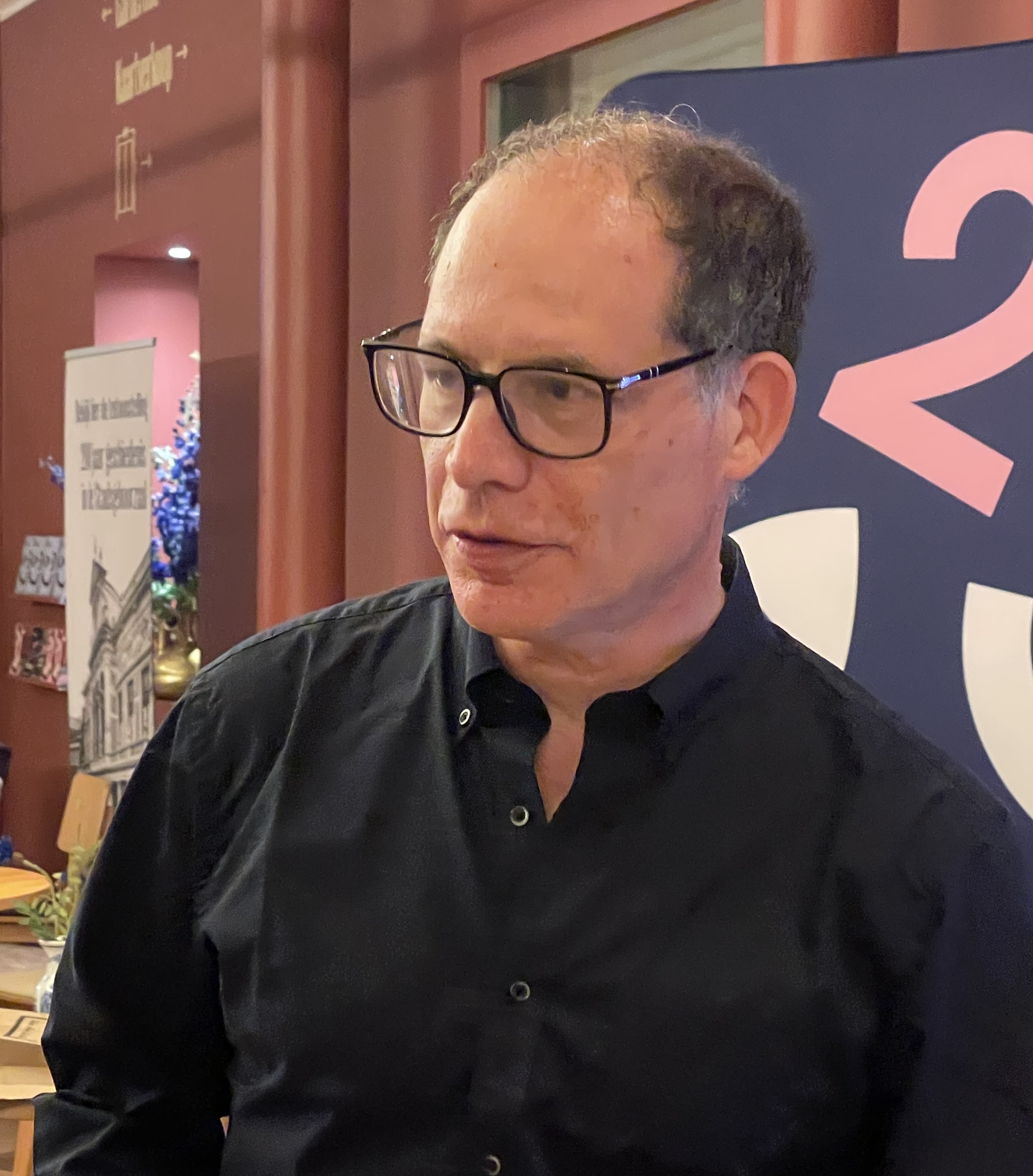
- Simon Kuper in 2026
- Born: Simon Gad Kuper; 15 October 1969 (age 56); Kampala, Uganda
- Education: University of Oxford (BA)
- Occupation: Journalist
- Known for: Sports journalism; Political journalism
- Spouse: Pamela Druckerman
- Awards: Kennedy Scholarship (1993); William Hill Sports Book of the Year (1994)
- Website: www.ft.com/simon-kuper

Simon Gad Kuper is a British, and naturalised French, author and journalist, best known for his work at the Financial Times and as a football commentator.

Born in Uganda to South African parents, Kuper spent most of his childhood in the Netherlands and lives in Paris. After studies at the University of Oxford, Harvard University and the Technische Universität Berlin, Kuper started his career in journalism at the Financial Times in 1994, where he writes about a wide range of topics, such as politics, society, culture, arts and sports. He also writes for other publications and has written a number of books.

== Early life and education ==
Kuper was born in Uganda of South African-born parents, and moved to Leiden in the Netherlands as a child. Kuper's father Adam Kuper, was a professor in anthropology at Leiden University. He was brought up Jewish and is named after his paternal grandfather, Simon Meyer Kuper, who was a South African Supreme Court judge assassinated in 1963.

He studied History and German at the University of Oxford, and attended Harvard University as a Kennedy Scholar in 1993.

== Career ==
=== Journalism ===
==== Financial Times ====
Kuper joined the Financial Times in 1994. He wrote the daily currencies column and worked in other departments, before leaving in 1998. He returned in 2002 as a sports columnist and has worked there ever since. Kuper's sportswriting is appreciated for its exploration of the societal, political and cultural impact of sports globally. Kuper discusses the culture that surrounds football — such as the Old Firm rivalry — as well as the on-field play. He has written on cricket, with articles on cricket in the Netherlands and cricket in apartheid South Africa.

Kuper also contributes to the FT's Weekend magazine, as a Life & Arts columnist, often with long-form essays and interviews spanning themes such as current affairs, travel, history and politics.

Kuper was awarded the British Society of Magazine Editors' prize for Columnist of the Year in 2016 and 2020.

==== Other publications ====
Kuper has also written for The Times and The Observer ESPN, and The Spectator.

Kuper also writes in Dutch, and his work frequently appeared in publications including the newspapers NRC Handelsblad and Het Financieele Dagblad, the literary football magazine Hard Gras and the online newspaper De Correspondent.

=== Authorship ===
- 1994 - Football Against the Enemy, William Hill awarded, released in the United States as Soccer Against the Enemy. The Times wrote of the book: "If you like football, read it. If you don't like football, read it."
- 2003 - Ajax, The Dutch, the War: Football in Europe during the Second World War
- 2009 - Soccernomics with Stefan Szymanski. The authors subsequently put forward a formula allowing Kuper to predict that Serbia and Brazil would play the 2010 FIFA World Cup Final.
- 2011 - The Football Men, a collection of articles about the world of football over 13 years, along with new pieces written for the book.
- 2021 - Barça: The Rise and Fall of the Club that Built Modern Football. It won the Sunday Times award for Football Book of the Year 2022.
- 2021 - The Happy Traitor, an account of the life and motivations of George Blake, a British spy for the Soviet Union. The narrative sheds light on Blake's ideological shifts and personal struggles with identity.
- 2022 - Chums - How a Tiny Caste of Oxford Tories Took Over the UK, about the connections that enabled a university network to dominate Westminster.

=== Bibliography ===
- Football Against the Enemy (1994)
- Ajax, The Dutch, The War: Football in Europe During the Second World War (2003)
- Soccernomics (Why England Lose: and Other Curious Phenomena Explained)
- The Football Men: Up Close with the Giants of the Modern Game (2011)
- Barça: The Rise and Fall of the Club That Built Modern Football (2021)
- The Happy Traitor: Spies, Lies and Exile in Russia: The Extraordinary Story of George Blake (2021)
- Chums: How a Tiny Caste of Oxford Tories Took Over the UK
- Good Chaps: How Corrupt Politicians Broke Our Law and Institutions - And What We Can Do About It (2024)
- Impossible City: Paris in the Twenty-First Century (2025)
- World Cup Fever: A Footballing Journey in Nine Tournaments (2025)

== Personal life ==
Kuper has lived in Jamaica, Sweden, Palo Alto, California, Berlin and London. As of 2026 Kuper lives in Paris with his wife, the American-French author Pamela Druckerman. They have three children. In 2022, he wrote in the Financial Times that he had recently become a naturalised French citizen after living in Paris for more than 20 years.

Awards
Preceded by Stephen Jones	William Hill Sports Book of the Year winner 1994	Succeeded by John Feinstein
