= Riviera, Gauteng =

Riviera
- Location within Gauteng Location within South Africa
- Coordinates: 26°9′23″S 28°2′26″E
- Country: South Africa
- Province: Gauteng
- Municipality: City of Johannesburg
- Main Place: Johannesburg
- Established: 1903

Area
  - Total: 0.20 km^{2} (0.077 sq mi)

Population (2011)
  - Total: 1,155
  - Density: 5,800/km^{2} (15,000/sq mi)

Racial makeup (2011)
  - Black African: 35.8%
  - Coloured: 2.4%
  - Indian/Asian: 24.4%
  - White: 34.6%
  - Other: 2.7%

First languages (2011)
  - English: 62.6%
  - Zulu: 6.7%
  - Xhosa: 4.4%
  - Tswana: 4.2%
  - Other: 22.1%
- Time zone: UTC+2 (SAST)
- Postal code (street): 7100

Riviera is a suburb of Johannesburg, South Africa. It is located in Region E of the City of Johannesburg Metropolitan Municipality.

== History ==
The suburb is situated on part of an old Witwatersrand farm called Braamfontein. It would be proclaimed as a suburb on 31 July 1903 as is named after the French or Italian Riviera.
