= Leo Kuper =

South African sociologist (1908–1994)

- Born: 24 November 1904; Johannesburg, Transvaal Colony
- Died: 23 May 1994 (aged 89); Los Angeles, California, U.S.
- Education: University of the Witwatersrand; University of North Carolina; University of Birmingham
- Spouse: Hilda Kuper
- Awards: Herskovits Prize (1966)
- Scientific career
- Fields: Law, sociology
- Workplaces: UCLA, University of Natal

Leo Kuper (20 November 1908 – 23 May 1994) was a South African sociologist specialising in the study of genocide and apartheid.

== Early life and legal career ==
Kuper was born to a Lithuanian Jewish family. His siblings included his sister Mary (d. 1948), who in later life directed the Johannesburg Legal Aid Bureau.

Kuper trained in law at the University of the Witwatersrand, receiving there his BA and LLB degrees. As a lawyer, he represented African clients in human-rights cases, and also represented one of the country's early non-segregated trade unions. He supported the establishment of South Africa's first legal aid charity.

== Wartime service ==
Kuper served with the Eighth Army in Kenya, Egypt, and Italy, as an intelligence officer, from 1940 to 1946. After the war he organised the National War Memorial Health Foundation, which provided social and medical services for disadvantaged people from all backgrounds.

== Scholarly and political activities ==
In 1947, Kuper went to the University of North Carolina, where he earned an M.A. in sociology. He was subsequently appointed Lecturer in Sociology at the University of Birmingham in England.

At Birmingham, Kuper directed a research project intended to help the city of Coventry recover from the bombing it received during World War II. This project culminated in the publication of Living in Towns (1953). Kuper completed a doctorate in sociology at the University of Birmingham in 1952, and moved to Durban, South Africa, as Professor of Sociology at the University of Natal.

Kuper was an active opponent of apartheid. Under his headship, the Sociology Department at the University of Natal was the only integrated academic department in South Africa. Kuper and his colleague Fatima Meer were subjected to surveillance by the apartheid government, and classes taught in the department were infiltrated by government spies, resulting in a chilling effect.

During his time in Durban, Kuper co-founded the Liberal Party of South Africa, and became chairman of its Natal branch. On 6 December 1956, Kuper and Alan Paton spoke on behalf of the Liberal Party at a fundraising event in Durban in aid of the Treason Trial defendants. They and four other speakers were arrested and charged under a segregationist statute, the Natal Provincial Notice No. 78 of 1933, accused of "holding, or attending, or participating in ... a meeting of natives". Of the ensuing trial, Paton recalled:

I remember only one thing ... I said to [Leo Kuper] that although this was the first time I had sat in the dock, I did not mind it at all. He said to me, with that gentle smile which was one of his great characteristics, "I don't like it at all."

On 1 August 1957, all six defendants were acquitted on appeal.

During the 1960s, Kuper moved to Los Angeles, California, United States, where he took up teaching and researching at UCLA and was appointed professor of sociology. His publications include The Pity of it All, Passive Resistance in South Africa, and The Prevention of Genocide. His book Genocide: Its Political Use in the Twentieth Century (1981) was particularly widely cited.

Kuper was a founding member of the International Council of the Institute on the Holocaust and Genocide in Jerusalem. In the mid-1980s, he founded International Alert, with the support of Michael Young, Martin Ennals and others.

== Personal life ==
In 1936, Kuper married anthropologist Hilda Beemer, with whom he had two daughters: the international human rights lawyer Dr Jenny Kuper and the painter and sculptor Mary Kuper.

== Works ==
1. Kuper, Leo (1953). Living in Towns: selected research papers in urban sociology of the Faculty of Commerce and Social Science, University of Birmingham. Cresset Press.
2. Passive Resistance in South Africa by Leo Kuper (New Haven, Yale University Press, 1957, 256 p., 4 p. of plates : ill.; 21 cm).
3. Kuper, Leo (1953). The Background to Passive Resistance: South Africa, 1952. British Journal of Sociology.
4. Kuper, Leo; Watts, Hilstan; Davies, Ronald (1987). Durban: A Study in Racial Ecology. St. Martin's Press.
5. Kuper, Leo (1960). The College Brew: A Satire. Durban: Universal Printing Works.
6. Leo Kuper (1965). An African Bourgeoisie: Race, Class, and Politics in South Africa. New Haven and London: Yale University Press. Pp. xviii+ 452. 21s. paperback.
7. Kuper, Hilda; Kuper, Leo (1965). African Law: Adaptation and Development. University of California Press. GGKEY:JB0L2JNY412.
8. Kuper, Leo; Smith, Michael Garfield (1969). Pluralism in Africa. University of California Press. ISBN 978-0-520-01872-3.
9. Kuper, Leo (1975). Race, class and power: ideology and revolutionary change in plural societies. Transaction Publishers. ISBN 978-0-202-36845-0.
10. Kuper, Leo (1975). Race, Science and Society. Unesco/Allen & Unwin. ISBN 9780231039086.
11. Kuper, Leo (1977). The pity of it all: polarisation of racial and ethnic relations. Duckworth. ISBN 978-0-7156-1114-2.
12. Kuper, Leo; Kuper, Hilda (1981). South Africa: Human Rights and Genocide; Biography as Interpretation. Indiana University, African Studies Program. ISBN 978-0-941934-33-6.
13. Kuper, Leo (1983). Genocide: Its Political Use in the Twentieth Century. Yale University Press. ISBN 978-0-300-03120-1.
14. Kuper, Leo (1984). International action against genocide. Minority Rights Group. ISBN 9780946690121.
15. Kuper, Leo (1985). The Prevention of Genocide. Yale University Press. ISBN 978-0-300-03418-9.
16. Cases and Materials on Genocide by Leo Kuper Foundation Staff, Publisher: Routledge (ISBN 9781859419298/1859419291).
17. Genocide Reader (Criminology) by Leo Kuper Foundation, Routledge Cavendish, 1 January 2007, 600 pages.
18. "Blueprint for Living Together" in Leo Kuper, ed., Living in Towns, London, 1953.
19. Kuper, L. (1949). "The South African Native: Caste, Proletariat or Race?". Social Forces. 28 (2): 146–153. doi:10.2307/2572640. ISSN 0037-7732. JSTOR 2572640.
20. Kuper, Leo (1950). "Review of 'White Settlers and Native Peoples'". The British Journal of Sociology. 1 (4): 363. doi:10.2307/586900. ISSN 0007-1315. JSTOR 586900.
21. Kuper, Leo (1951). "Social Science Research and the Planning of Urban Neighbourhoods". Social Science Research and the Planning of Urban Neighbourhoods. 29: 237–243.
22. Kuper, Leo (1953). "The Background to Passive Resistance (South Africa, 1952)". The British Journal of Sociology. 4 (3): 243–256. doi:10.2307/587540. ISSN 0007-1315. JSTOR 587540.
23. Kuper, L. (1954). "The Control of Social Change: A South African Experiment". Social Forces. 33 (1): 19–29. doi:10.2307/2573139. ISSN 0037-7732. JSTOR 2573139.
24. "Techniques. of Social Control in South Africa" by Leo Kuper, Listener 55, 31 May 1956, pp. 708.
25. "Rights and riots in Natal" by Leo Kuper In Africa South, Vol.4, No.2, Jan–Mar 1960, pp. 20–26.
26. "The Heightening of Racial Tension" by Leo Kuper, In The Heightening of Racial Tension, Vol.2, 1960, pp. 24–32.
27. "Ethnic and Racial Pluralism: Some Aspects of Polarization and Depluralization." In Leo Kuper and MG. Smith, M.G. (Eds) Pluralism in Africa. Berkeley and Los
28. "Racialism and Integration in South African Society" by Leo Kuper, In Racialism and Integration in South African Society, Vol.4, 1963, pp. 26–31.
29. "The problem of violence in South Africa" by Leo Kuper, in Inquiry (Taylor & Francis), Vol.7 (1–4), 1964, pages 295–303.
30. "Book Review: Caneville: The Social Structure of a South African Town. Pierre L. Van Den Berghe, Edna Miller" by Leo Kuper, In American Journal of Sociology, Vol.71 (1), 1965, pp. 115.
31. "Neighbour on the Hearth." by Leo Kuper – Environmental Psychology: Man and His Physical Setting, edited by H. M. Proshansky, W. H. Ittelson and L. G. Rivlin, (New York: Holt, Rinehart & Winston, 1970).
32. "Continuities and Discontinuities in Race Relations: Evolutionary or Revolutionary Change" by Leo Kuper in Cahiers d'études africaines ( published by EHESS ), Vol. 10, Cahier 39, 1970, pp. 361–383.
33. Kuper, Leo (2009). "Theories of Revolution and Race Relations*". Comparative Studies in Society and History. 13 (1): 87–107. doi:10.1017/S0010417500006125. ISSN 0010-4175.
34. "African Nationalism in South Africa, 1910–1964" by Leo Kuper in The Oxford History of South Africa, Vol. II, M. Wilson and L. Thompson (eds.), Oxford: Clarendon Press, 1971, pp. 424–476.
35. Kuper, Leo (2009). "Race, Class and Power: Some Comments on Revolutionary Change". Comparative Studies in Society and History. 14 (4): 400–421. doi:10.1017/S0010417500006782. ISSN 0010-4175.
36. Kuper, Leo (1975). "Censorship by proxy". Index on Censorship. 4 (3): 48–50. doi:10.1080/03064227508532449. ISSN 0306-4220. S2CID 144663151.
37. "Book Review: Ethnicity and Resource Competition in Plural Societies. Leo A. Despres" by Leo Kuper, In American Journal of Sociology, Vol.82 (5), 1977, pp. 1146.
38. "Types of Genocide and Mass Murder" by Leo Kuper, In Israel W. Charny (ed.) Toward the understanding and prevention of genocide: Proceedings of the International Conference on the Holocaust and Genocide. Boulder and London: Westview Press, 1984, pages 32–47.
39. Kuper, Leo (2009). "The Turkish genocide of Armenians, 1915–1917". In Richard G. Hovannisian (ed.). The Armenian Genocide in Perspective. Transaction Publishers. ISBN 978-1-4128-0891-0.
40. "The Nazi Doctors: Medical Killing and the Psychology of Genocide.", by Robert Jay Lifton and by Leo Kuper, Political Science Quarterly, Vol.102 (1), March 1987, pp. 175.
41. "In the Belly of the Beast: The Modern State as Mass Murderer" by Robin M. Williams, Leo Kuper, in Contemporary Sociology, Vol.16 (4), 1987, pp. 502.
42. "Genocide and the Modern Age: Etiology and Case Studies of Mass Death" by Leo Kuper, Isidor Walliman, Michael N. Dobkowski, In Contemporary Sociology, Vol.17 (1), 1988, pp. 24.
43. Kuper, Leo (1989). "Biology as Destiny: The Scientific Mystifications of Medical Mass Murder". Contemporary Sociology. 18 (5). Robert N. Proctor (ed.): 753–755. doi:10.2307/2073343. ISSN 1939-8638. JSTOR 2073343.
44. "Theological warrants for genocide: Judaism, Islam and Christianity" by Leo Kuper – Terrorism and Political Violence, Volume 2, Issue 3, 1990, pages 351–379.
45. "On Jewish Disconnection from Other Genocides." by Leo Kuper – Internet on the Holocaust and Genocide, Issues 49–50, Special Section, 1990, p. 7.
46. Revolution and Genocide: On the Origins of the Armenian Genocide and the Holocaust, 2nd edition by Robert Melson, Leo Kuper (Introduction), Leo Kuper (Foreword by)
47. Kuper, L. (1990). "The genocidal state: an overview". State Violence and Ethnicity: 19–51.
48. "The Genocidal State: An Overview", by Leo Kuper in Pierre L. van den Berghe, ed., State Violence and Ethnicity (Niwot, CO: University Press of Colorado), 1990, pp. 44.
49. "The Roots of Evil: The Origins of Genocide and Other Group Violence." by Leo Kuper, Ervin Staub, In Contemporary Sociology, Vol.19 (5), 1990, pp. 683.
50. "The Genocidal Mentality: Nazi Holocaust and Nuclear Threat" by Leo Kuper, Robert Jay Lifton, Erik Markusen, In Contemporary Sociology, Vol.20 (2), 1991, pp. 217.
51. "Lethal Politics: Soviet Genocide and Mass Murder since 1917" by Leo Kuper, R. J. Rummel, In Contemporary Sociology, Vol.20 (3), 1991, pp. 433.
52. "Reflections on the Prevention of Genocide," by Leo Kuper in Helen Fein (Ed.) Genocide Watch. New Haven, CT: Yale University Press, 1992, pp. 135–161.
53. "Theoretical Issues relating to Genocide: Uses and Abuses" by Leo Kuper in G.J. Andreopoulos (ed.), Genocide: Conceptual and Historical Dimensions, University of Pennsylvania Press, Philadelphia, 1994, p. 31–46.

== Notes and references ==
- Galchinsky, Michael (2008). Jews and Human Rights: Dancing at Three Weddings. Rowman & Littlefield. ISBN 978-0-7425-5267-8.
- Totten, Samuel; Jacobs, Steven Leonard (2013). Pioneers of Genocide Studies. Transaction Publishers. ISBN 978-1-4128-4974-6.
- Totten, Samuel; Bartrop, Paul Robert (2008). Dictionary of Genocide: A-L. Vol. 1: A-L. ABC-CLIO. ISBN 978-0-313-34642-2.
- van den Berghe, Pierre (1989). Stranger in their Midst. University Press of Colorado. ISBN 0870812025.
- "Leo Kuper, 85, Dies; Wrote on Genocide". The New York Times. 29 May 1994.
- Charny, Israel W. (1994). "In Memoriam: Professor Leo Kuper". Holocaust and Genocide Studies. 8 (3): 446–447. doi:10.1093/hgs/8.3.446. ISSN 8756-6583.
- Hance, William A. (1968). Southern Africa and the United States. New York, Columbia University Press.
