= Florbal MB =

Czech floorball club

- Official logo of Florbal MB
- Full name: Předvýběr.CZ Florbal Mladá Boleslav
- Founded: 1998
- Arena: MSH Mladá Boleslav
- League: Superliga florbalu
- Championships: Superliga florbalu (5 titles)

Florbal MB (Předvýběr.CZ Florbal Mladá Boleslav after its sponsor) is a floorball club based in Mladá Boleslav, Czech Republic. The current club was formed in 2003 by merging FbK Mladá Boleslav (1999) and Sokol Mladá Boleslav (1998).

The men's team has played in the highest Czech floorball league, Superliga florbalu, since the season 2004–05, after being promoted from a lower league. With four titles in the 2017–18, 2020–21, 2021–22, 2024–25 and 2025–26 seasons, it is the third most successful team of the league, after Tatran Střešovice and 1. SC Vítkovice. The team was only fourth one to win a title, and the first one that started in a lower league.

The team also won three second places, in the seasons 2014–15, 2016–17, and 2018–19. In 2025, they won silver at the Champions Cup.

== Honours ==
=== Titles ===
- Superliga florbalu: 2017–18, 2020–21, 2021–22 and 2024–25

== Gallery ==
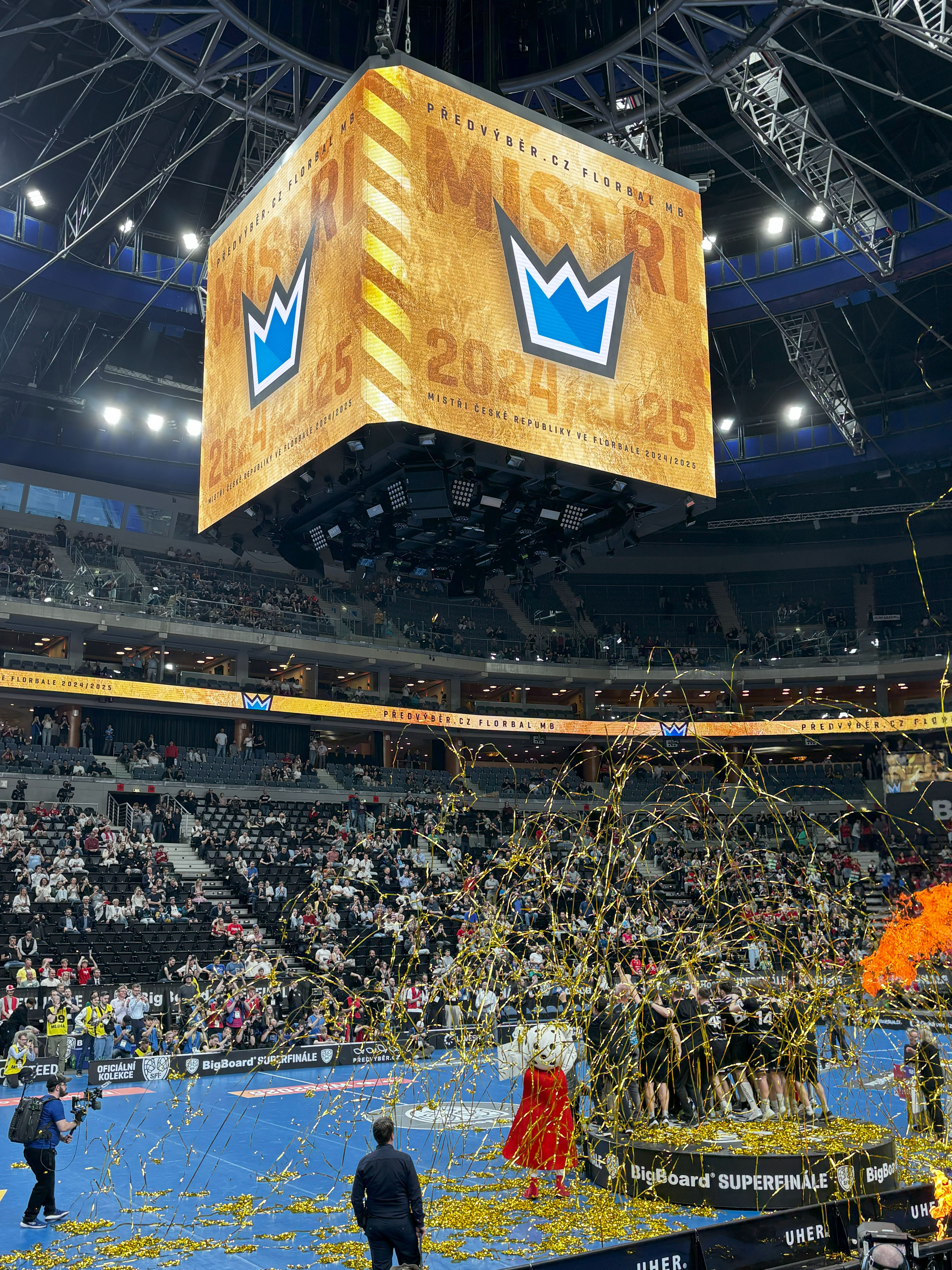
Men's team celebrating winning the title in the 2024–25 season

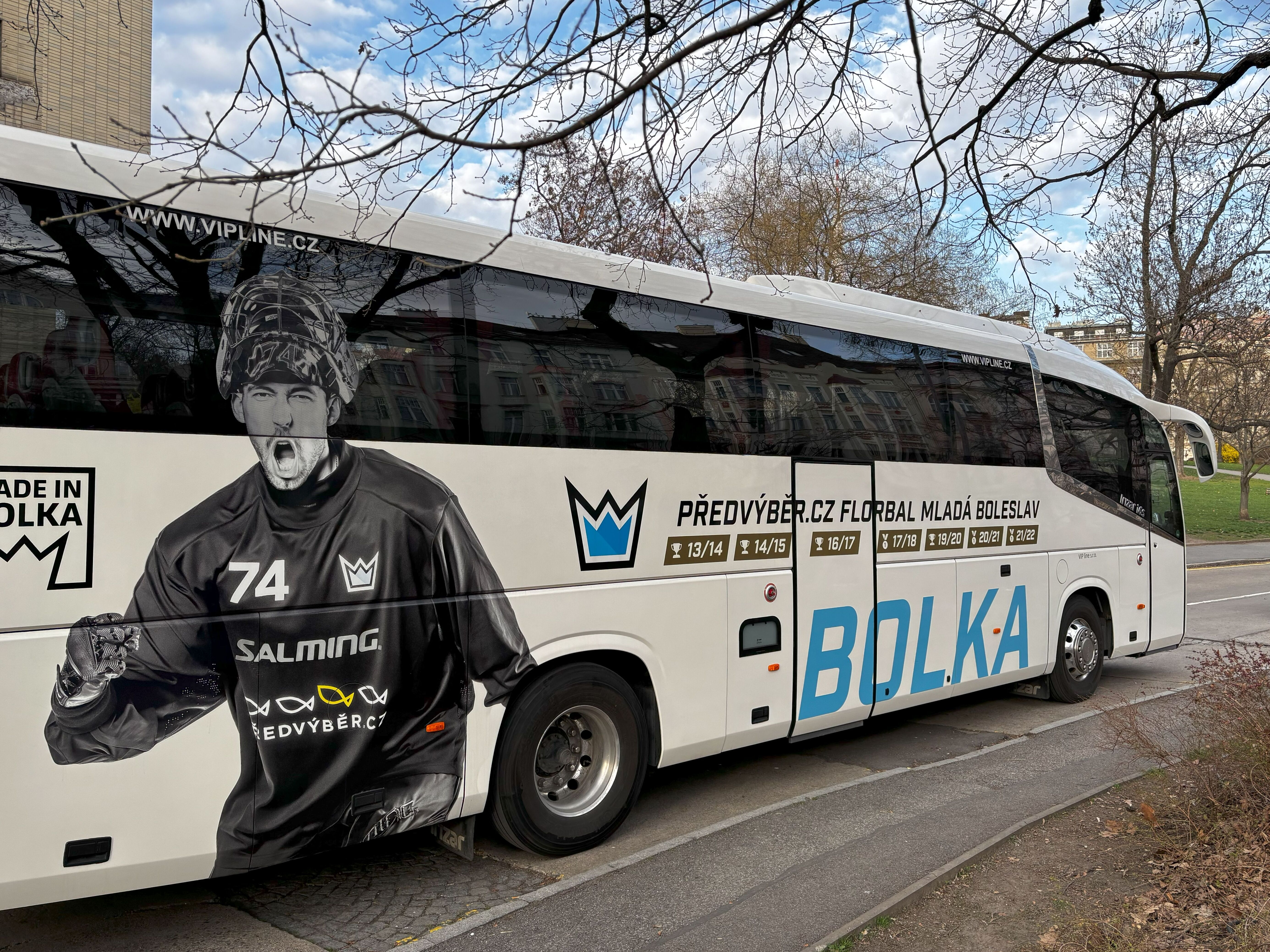
Club bus

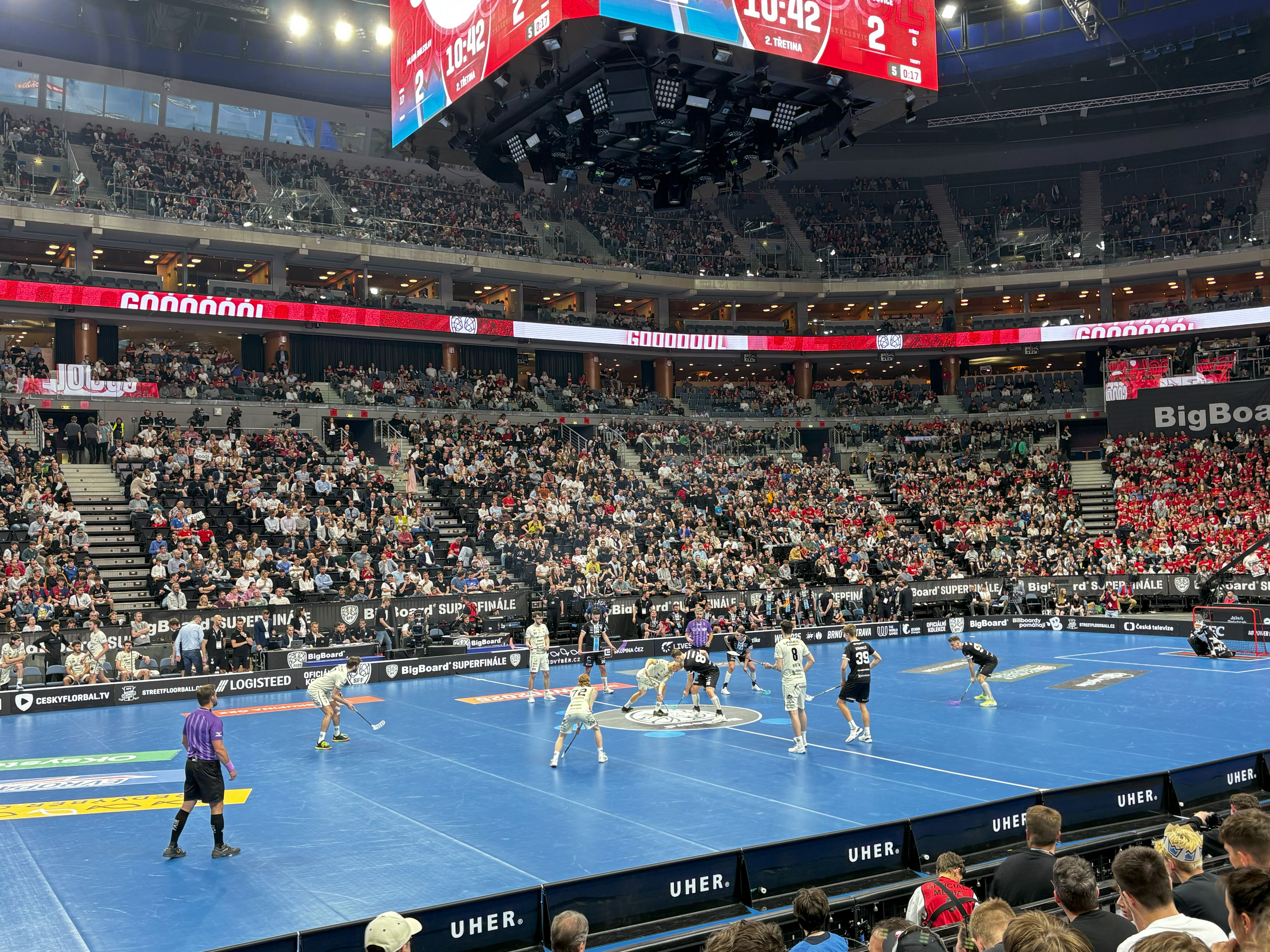
Men's team (in black) in the final of the 2024–25 season

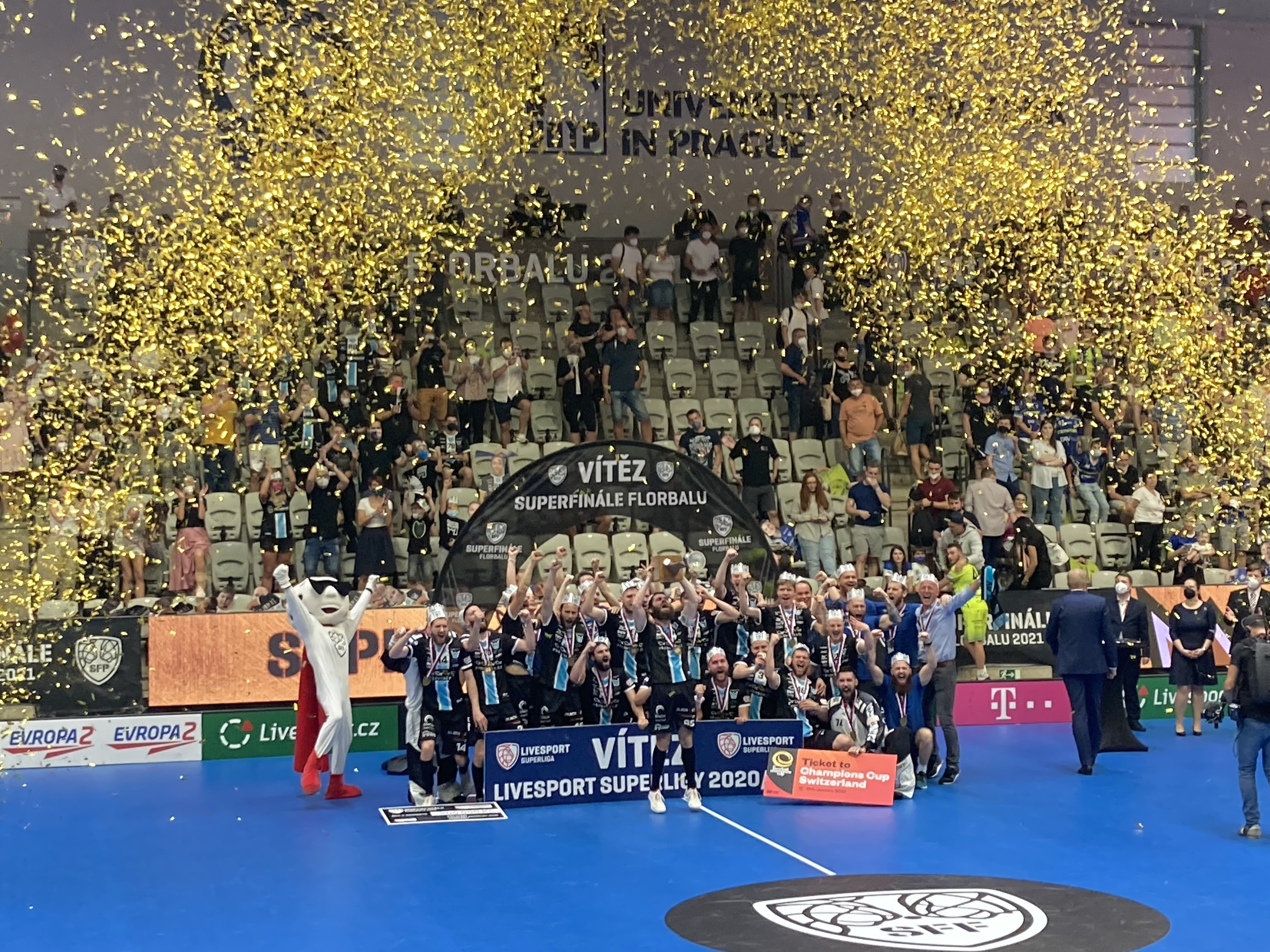
Men's team celebrating the championship title in the 2020–21 season.
